= 2022 in Finland =

- Decades: 2000s; 2010s; 2020s; 2030s
- See also: Other events of 2022; Timeline of Finnish history

Events in the year 2022 in Finland.

== Incumbents ==
- President: Sauli Niinistö
- Prime Minister: Sanna Marin
- Parliament: 2019-2023 Eduskunta/Riksdag
- Speaker of the Parliament: Anu Vehviläinen (until 1 February); Matti Vanhanen onwards

== Events ==
Ongoing — COVID-19 pandemic in Finland (Until 11 April); Accession of Finland to NATO

=== January ===
- 1 January – Finland rejects Russian demands that it never join the North Atlantic Treaty Organization, with President Sauli Niinistö saying that it is his country's right to join the military alliance if it wants to.
- 13 January – Finland reduces the quarantine period for positive COVID-19 patients to five days because the duration of the SARS-CoV-2 Omicron variant's virus cycle is shorter than other variants.
- 23 January – First county elections in Finland are being held to choose council members for the 21 new wellbeing services counties.

=== February ===
- 11 February – Finland agrees to a $9.4 billion deal with the United States to purchase 64 F-35 Lightning II stealth fighter-jets for its air force. The agreement also includes buying advanced surface-to-surface missiles from Lockheed Martin in order to upgrade the country's missile systems. The munition deliveries are expected to begin by 2025.

=== March ===
- 25 March – Finland's state-owned VR Group announces that it will suspend all train services on the Riihimäki–Saint Petersburg railway, which connects Helsinki and Saint Petersburg, on March 28. The suspension will close one of the last public transport routes to the European Union for Russians.

=== April ===
- 11 April – Mass COVID-19 testing in Finland will no longer need them anymore as the country ahead to the endemic phase.

=== May ===
- 4 May – Finland says that a Russian Air Force Mi-17 violated its airspace this morning, flying "four to five kilometres" inside Finnish airspace. The incursion comes ahead of an expected Finnish application to join NATO.
- 11 May – British Prime Minister Boris Johnson signs security agreements with Finland and Sweden, pledging British military assistance to both Nordic countries should they come under attack.
- 12 May – Finland's leaders declare that the country should apply for membership of NATO "without delay," with the Parliament set to vote next week on whether to apply.
- 13 May – RAO Nordic, a subsidiary of Russian energy company Inter RAO, announces it will suspend deliveries of electricity to Finland, saying it has not been paid for prior deliveries. The suspension comes as Russia threatens retaliation if Finland joins NATO.
- 15 May – President Sauli Niinistö and Prime Minister Sanna Marin formally announce that Finland will apply for NATO membership. Niinistö says that "this is a historic day", and that Finland is "entering a new era".
- 18 May – Finland and Sweden both formally apply to join NATO.
- 20 May – Russia announces that it will suspend its supply of natural gas to Finland beginning at 4:00 GMT tomorrow due to Finland's refusal to comply with Russia's demand that gas be paid for in rubles.
- 25 May – Finland reports its first suspected case of monkeypox.

=== June ===
- 28 June – Finland, Sweden, and Turkey sign a joint memorandum on security, clearing the way for Finland and Sweden's NATO accession bids.
- 5 July – All 30 members of NATO have signed off on the accession protocols for the membership bids of Finland and Sweden, which is subject to unanimous approval by the current members' legislative bodies.

=== September ===
- 28 September – A mobile draft centre is built at the Torfyanovka checkpoint, the busiest checkpoint on the Finland–Russia border, in order to prevent people who are fit to serve from fleeing the country. However, as of midday, the centre is not yet open.
- 29 September – Finland announces that it will deny entry to Russian tourists beginning on Thursday night, thereby cutting off the last direct link between Russia and the European Union.

== Deaths ==
=== January ===
- 2 January
  - Jarmo Jääskeläinen, 84, Finnish journalist and documentary filmmaker.
  - Jorma Katrama, 85, Finnish double bassist.
- 4 January – Jaakko Jonkka, 68, Finnish jurist, chancellor of justice (2007–2018).
- 5 January – Siiri Perälä, 28, futsal player
- 9 January – Jouni Seistamo, 82, Finnish Olympic ice hockey player (1960, 1964)
- 10 January – Olavi Rinteenpää, 97, Finnish Olympic steeplechase runner (1952, 1956)
- 18 January – Paavo Heininen, 84, Finnish composer and pianist
- 22 January – Tuomo Polvinen, 90, Finnish historian, chief of the National Archives (1970–1974).

=== February ===
- 19 February – Irma Rosnell, 94, Finnish politician, MP (1954–1987).
- 22 February – Lasse Näsi, 91, Finnish politician, MP (1991–1995).
- 23 February – Jaakko Kuusisto, 48, Finnish composer, conductor, and violinist

=== March ===
- 12 March – Pentti Karvonen, 90, Finnish Olympic steeplechase runner (1960).
- 15 March – Anneli Sauli, 89, Finnish actress (Miriam, Doctor Sibelius, The Man Without a Past).

=== April ===
- 3 April – Heikki Hedman, 81, Finnish tennis player.
- 14 April – Ilkka Kanerva, 74, Finnish politician, MP (since 1975), minister of labour (1991–1995), and deputy prime minister (1991).
- 18 April – Seppo Nikkari, 74, Finnish Olympic runner (1972).

=== May ===
- 4 May
  - Lalli Partinen, 80, Finnish Olympic ice hockey player (1968)
  - Juhani Salmenkylä, 90, Finnish Olympic basketball official (1964) and orienteering competitor, European relay champion (1964).
- 22 May – Jaakko Syrjä, 96, Finnish writer
- 23 May – Ilkka Suominen, 83, Finnish politician, speaker of the Parliament (1987, 1991–1993) and president of the Nordic Council (1992).

=== June ===
- 6 June – Keijo Korhonen, 88, Finnish diplomat and politician, minister for foreign affairs (1976–1977).
- 10 June – Väinö Markkanen, 93, Finnish sports shooter, Olympic champion (1964), heart attack.
- 10 June – Aarno Turpeinen, 51, Finnish footballer (OTP, HJK, national team).
- 15 June – Tauno Timoska, 90, Finnish Olympic field hockey player (1952).
- 25 June – Kim Weber, 76, Finnish Olympic sailor (1972).
- 29 June – Eeles Landström, 90, Finnish pole vaulter and politician, MP (1966–1972), Olympic bronze medalist (1960).

=== July ===
- 12 July – Ville Kurki, 54, Finnish Olympic sailor (1996).
- 13 July – Antti Litja, 84, Finnish actor (The Year of the Hare, The Clan – Tale of the Frogs, Farewell, Mr. President).
- 21 July – Martti Lehtevä, 91, Finnish Olympic boxer (1960).
- 21 July – Reino Paasilinna, 82, Finnish politician, MEP (1996–2009)
- 22 July – Heikki Haavisto, 86, Finnish politician, minister for foreign affairs (1993–1995).

=== August ===
- 4 August – Ilmari Vesterinen, 80, Finnish professor, ethnologist and anthropologist
- 9 August – Jussi Hakulinen, 57, Finnish musician and singer-songwriter.
- 10 August – Vesa-Matti Loiri, 77, Finnish actor, musician and comedian, best known for his role as Uuno Turhapuro.
- 10 August – Eino Oksanen, 91, Finnish Olympic marathon runner (1956, 1960, 1964).
- 12 August – Eino Kalpala, 96, Finnish Olympic alpine skier (1952).
- 16 August – Matti Lehtinen, 100, Finnish baritone singer.
- 22 August – Erkki Pulliainen, 84, Finnish biologist and politician, MP (1987–2011).
- 25 August – Kimmo Blom, 52, Finnish singer (Raskasta Joulua)

=== September ===
- 10 September – Väinö Vilponiemi, 96, Finnish politician, MP (1962–1975).
- 19 September – Jaakko Numminen, 93, Finnish politician, minister of education (1970).
- 21 September – Sirkka Norrlund, 79, Finnish Olympic hurdler (1964).
- 30 September – Outi Heiskanen, 85, Finnish artist

=== October ===
- 5 October – Ann-Christine Nyström, 78, Finnish singer
- 10 October – Paavo Roininen, 87, Finnish Olympic boxer (1960).
- 12 October – Osmo Pekonen, 62, Finnish mathematician, science historian and writer

=== November ===
- 5 November – Kalevi Mattila, 87, Finnish politician, MP (1975–1995).
- 15 November – Heimo Linna, 96, Finnish politician, MP (1966–1987), minister of agriculture and forestry (1973–1975, 1975–1976).
- 18 November – Päiviö Tommila, 91, Finnish historian, member of the Academy of Finland (since 2004)
- 19 November – Ele Alenius, 97, Finnish politician, deputy minister of finance (1966–1970) and MP (1966–1977).

=== December ===
- 1 December – Roni Peiponen, 25, Finnish footballer (Klubi 04, Åsane, HJK Helsinki)
- 6 December – Risto Alapuro, 78, Finnish sociologist
- 17 December – Eero Tapio, 81, Finnish Olympic wrestler (1964, 1968, 1972).
