= 2020 in Finland =

- Decades: 2000s; 2010s; 2020s; 2030s
- See also: Other events of 2020; Timeline of Finnish history

Events from the year 2020 in Finland

== Incumbents ==
- President: Sauli Niinistö
- Prime Minister: Sanna Marin
- Speaker: Matti Vanhanen (until 9 June), Anu Vehviläinen (from 9 June)

== Events ==
=== January ===
- January 27 – Following the developments of COVID-19 outbreak in mainland China, Finland's Ministry for Foreign Affairs advised citizens to avoid unnecessary travel to Hubei province.
- January 28 – Finnair announced it would be suspending its five weekly routes to Nanjing and Beijing Daxing until the end of March.
- January 29 – COVID-19 pandemic in Finland: 1st confirmed case. A 32-year-old Chinese woman from Wuhan sought medical attention in Ivalo and tested positive for SARS-CoV-2. She had travelled from Wuhan. She was quarantined at Lapland Central Hospital in Rovaniemi.
- January 30 – Finland's health officials estimated that up to 24 people may have been exposed to the virus.

=== February ===
- February 5 – 3 of the 24 people suspected of being exposed have left Finland by this date, and 14 of the remaining 21 have been quarantined.
- February 26 – Finland's health officials confirmed the second case, a Finnish woman, who made a trip to Milan and was back in Finland on 22 February, tested positive at the Helsinki University Central Hospital.
- February 28 – A Finnish woman who had traveled to Northern Italy, tested positive by the Helsinki and Uusimaa Hospital District and was advised to remain in home isolation.

=== March ===
- March 13 – the remaining part of the 2019–20 Liiga season was cancelled due to the coronavirus pandemic.
- March 28 – the region of Uusimaa was temporarily isolated from the rest of Finland due to increased COVID-19 infections.

=== July ===
- July 17 – Finns Party political functionary Pekka Kataja was assaulted in his home by two unknown people posing as parcel delivery men. Kataja was beaten with a hammer or similar object approximately 20 times and suffered a fractured skull. The case was investigated by the police as an attempted murder, and remains unsolved as of 2025.

=== August ===
- August 1 – Prime Minister Sanna Marin married her long-time partner Markus Räikkönen at Kesäranta.

=== October ===
- October 21 – The Vastaamo data breach case began with a then-unknown person or group (later revealed to be ex-Lizard Squad member Aleksanteri Kivimäki, also known as Julius Kivimäki) releasing online some of the data on patients and their histories that they had acquired from the Vastaamo psychotherapy centre. Among the affected were politician Kirsi Piha.

=== December ===
- 4 December – Three underage boys murdered a 16-year-old boy in an act of protracted violence in Helsinki.

== Deaths ==
=== January ===
- 20 January – Reijo Kuistila, 88, Finnish Olympic equestrian.
- 23 January – Kalevi Tuominen, Hall of Fame basketball player, coach and executive (b. 1927)
- 30 January – Jörn Donner, writer, film director and politician (b. 1933)

=== February ===
- 28 February – Stig-Göran Myntti, football and bandy player (b. 1925)

=== March ===
- 5 March – Susanna Majuri, photographer (b. 1978)
- 7 March – Karri Käyhkö, Olympic swimmer (b. 1937)
- 11 March – Aarne Kainlauri, Olympic steeplechaser (b. 1915)
- 12 March – Juha Harjula, Olympic basketball player (b. 1942)
- 19 March – Max Engman, historian and translator (b. 1945)
- 26 March – Olavi Borg, professor and politician, Liberal People's Party member of parliament 1972–1975 (b. 1935)

=== April ===
- 4 April – Pertti Paasio, politician, Minister of Foreign Affairs 1989–1991 (b. 1939)
- 5 April – Pentti Linkola, writer, ornithologist and ecologist (b. 1932)
- 12 April – Mikko Kaasalainen, mathematician (b. 1965)
- 15 April – Vesa Törnroos, Olympic sports shooter (b. 1982)
- 26 April – Kauko Juhantalo, Centre Party politician (b. 1942)

=== May ===
- 8 May – Ritva Valkama, actress (b. 1932)
- 9 May
  - Timo Honkela, computer scientist (b. 1962)
  - Kari Karanko, diplomat (b. 1941)
- 26 May
  - Johanna Ehrnrooth, painter (b. 1958)
  - Jon Hellevig, lawyer and businessman (b. 1962)

=== June ===
- 3 June – Veli Lehtelä, rower, Olympic bronze medalist (b. 1935)
- 24 June – Gösta Ågren, poet (b. 1936)
- 27 June – Arja Tuomarila, singer and continuity announcer (b. 1941)

=== July ===
- 12 July – Jarno Sarkula, musician (Alamaailman Vasarat) (b. 1973)
- 18 July – Jope Ruonansuu, actor, musician and stand-up comedian (b. 1964)
- 20 July – Mirja Jämes, 95, Finnish Olympic hurdler (1948).

=== August ===
- 14 August – Kalevi Oikarainen, 84, Finnish cross-country skier, world champion (1970), Olympic bronze medalist (1968).
- 25 August – Erik Allardt, 95, Finnish sociologist, Chancellor of Åbo Akademi University (1992–1994).
- 28 August – Jan Klenberg, admiral, Chief of Defence 1990–1994 (b. 1931)

=== September ===
- 8 September – Vexi Salmi, lyricist (b. 1942)

=== October ===
- 16 October – Marjatta Väänänen, politician, Minister of Culture 1972–1975, Education 1976–1977 and Social Affairs and Health 1982–1983 (b. 1923)

=== November ===
- 1 November – Tuomas Gerdt, military officer, last surviving Mannerheim Cross recipient (b. 1922)
- 3 November – Matti Laakso, Olympic wrestler (b. 1939)
- 5 November – Ossi Runne, trumpeter, orchestra leader and composer (b. 1927)
- 6 November – Sakari Paasonen, Olympic shooter (b. 1935)
- 14 November – Osmo Ala-Honkola, Olympic shooter (b. 1939)
- 20 November – Hannu Lahtinen, Olympic wrestler (b. 1960)
- 25 November – Paul Nyman, Olympic racing cyclist (b. 1929)

=== December ===
- 11 December – Richard Tötterman, diplomat (b. 1926)
- 14 December – Seppo Vainio, Olympic ice hockey player (b. 1937)
- 28 December – Jyrki Heliskoski, football coach (b. 1945)
- 31 December – Olli Lehto, mathematician (b. 1925)
