= 2023 in Finland =

- Decades: 2000s; 2010s; 2020s
- See also: Other events of 2023; Timeline of Finnish history

Events in the year 2023 in Finland.

== Incumbents ==
- President: Sauli Niinistö
- Prime Minister:
  - Sanna Marin (till 20 June 2023)
  - Petteri Orpo (from 20 June 2023)
- Parliament: 2019–2023 Eduskunta/Riksdag
- Speaker of the Parliament:
  - Matti Vanhanen (till 4 April 2023)
  - Petteri Orpo (till 20 June 2023)
  - Jussi Halla-aho (from 21 June 2023)

== Events ==
Ongoing — Accession of Finland to NATO (Until 4 April)

- 1 March – The Finnish Parliament votes 184–7 to formally approve the country's accession to NATO, and to adopt the military alliance's founding documents.
- 17 March – Turkish president Recep Tayyip Erdoğan submits a bill on granting Finland membership into NATO to the Grand National Assembly.
- 30 March – Turkey's Grand National Assembly approves Finland's NATO membership bid.
- 31 March – Turkish President Recep Tayyip Erdoğan signed and approved the proposal containing Finland's accession protocol to NATO.
- 2 April – 2023 Finnish parliamentary election: Finns elect the 200 members of the parliament. Centre-right National Coalition Party wins the most votes at 20.7%, while the ruling Social Democratic Party places third with 19.9%. The Finns Party becomes the 2nd largest party in Parliament and got its highest vote ever with 20.1%.
- 4 April – Finland officially joins NATO, becoming the 31st member of the military alliance and expanding NATO's border with Russia by 1,300 kilometres (810 mi).
- 10 May – 2023 Espoo bridge collapse.
- 20 June – 2023 Finnish parliamentary election: Petteri Orpo is officially appointed as the 47th Prime Minister and his cabinet is formed.
  - Former Finns Party leader Jussi Halla-aho is named Speaker of the Parliament of Finland
- 30 June – Finns Party Vilhelm Junnila announces his resignation as Minister of Economic Affairs in the Orpo Cabinet after his past actions and potential connections to neo-Nazi organizations became a subject of heated discussion.
- 10 October – Finland reports that the Balticconnector submarine pipeline connecting Finland and Estonia has been closed following damage and a gas leak.
- 28 November – Finland closes the entire border with Russia after accusing the Russian government of facilitating the entry of asylum seekers into the country.
- 29 November – Polish National Security Bureau chief Jacek Siewiera announces that Poland will send "a team of military advisors" to the Finland–Russia border in response to an official request for allied support. Russia warns against the move, viewing the concentration of troops on the border as a threat.
- 14 December – Finland announces the creation of a defense cooperation agreement with the United States. The agreement will grant Finland access to American military resources for use in defensive operations, while the US will gain military access to the nation in the event of conflict.

== Sports ==
- 2023 Veikkausliiga
- 2023 Ykkönen
- 2023 Kakkonen
- 2023 Finnish Cup
- UEFA Euro 2024 qualifying Group H
- 2022–23 Liiga season

== Deaths ==
- 13 January – Kai Kalima, 77, lawyer and politician, MP (1989–1991).
- 14 January – Juhan af Grann, 78, film director and unidentified flying object documentary filmmaker.
- 16 January – Reino Nyyssönen, 87, tennis player.
- 27 January – Raimo Aulis Anttila, 87, linguist.
- 8 February – Arto Heiskanen, 59, ice hockey player (Porin Ässät, Lukko, Albatros de Brest).
- 13 February – Mikaela Fabricius-Bjerre, 53, Olympic dressage rider (2012).
- 27 February – Juha Valjakkala, 57, convicted murderer.
- 5 March –
  - Ilkka Järvi-Laturi, 61, Finnish-born American film director (Spy Games).
  - Matti Klinge, 86, historian.
- 8 March – Pentti Koskinen, 79, Olympic diver (1964, 1968, 1972).
- 18 March – Pekka Paavola, 89, politician, minister of justice (1972).
- 21 March – Harri Nykänen, 69, writer.
- 27 March – Tauno Honkanen, 95, Olympic skier (1948).
- 22 April – Ulf Sundqvist, 78, politician, minister of education (1972–1975) and trade (1979–1981).
- 26 April – Stina Rautelin, 59, Finnish-Swedish actress (Beck, Fallet, Rederiet).
- 29 April – Eero Saari, 94, Olympic ice hockey player (1952).
- 5 May –
  - Martti Aiha, 70, sculptor.
  - Siiri Rantanen, 98, cross-country skier, Olympic champion (1956).
- 6 May – Raimo Partanen, 82, Olympic skier (1964).
- 13 May – Johan Gullichsen, 86, Olympic sailor (1964).
- 26 May – Nils Henriksson, 94, Olympic cyclist (1952).
- 28 May – Matti Kilpiö, 83–84, philologist.
- 29 May –
  - Teppo Rastio, 89, ice hockey (Lukko, Ilves) and football (national team) player.
  - Tove Skutnabb-Kangas, 82, linguist.
- 2 June – Kaija Saariaho, 70, composer (Petals, La Passion de Simone, D'Om le Vrai Sens).
- 7 June – Eva Hög, 95, Olympic cross-country skier (1960).
- 8 June – Mari Ruti, 58–59, Finnish-born Canadian philosopher.
- 10 June – Jari Niinimäki, 65, footballer (Ilves, AIK, national team).
- 18 June – Anders Ruben Forsblom, 91, Olympic cyclist (1952).
- 23 June – Kunto Ojansivu, 63, actor (Elf Toljander, Sibelius, Rentun Ruusu).
- 26 June – Juha Hernesniemi, 75, neurosurgeon.
- 4 July – Miki Liukkonen, 33, writer, poet and musician.
- 10 July – Eero Lohi, 95, Olympic modern pentathlete (1960).
- 15 July – Yrjö Hakala, 91, Olympic ice hockey player (1952, 1960).
- 28 July – Timo Hirvonen, 49, ice hockey player (Kiekko-Espoo, SaiPa) and coach.
- 7 August – Aimo Vartiainen, 96, Olympic alpine skier (1948).
- 20 August – Pentti Virrankoski, 94, Canadian-born Finnish historian.
- 26 August – Lasse J. Laine, 77, ornithologist.
- 27 August – Minna Tarkka, 62, art critic and curator.
- 4 September – Eero Laine, 89, Olympic rower (1960).
- 5 September –
  - Erkki Hautamäki, 93, Olympic decathlete (1952) and historian.
  - Risto Näätänen, 84, psychologist.
- 16 September – Torsti Lehtinen, 81, writer and philosopher.
- 25 September – Juhani Salovaara, 91, Olympic sailor (1964).
- 5 October – Risto Näätänen, 84, psychologist.
- 11 October – Markku Syrjälä, 68, Olympic archer (1984).
- 12 October –
  - Kurt Mattsson, 83, Olympic boxer (1964).
  - Tero Rönni, 69, politician, MP (1999–2011).
- 13 October – Jaakko Ihamuotila, 83, business executive, CEO of Valmet (1973–1979), president and chairman of Neste (1980–2000).
- 16 October – Martti Ahtisaari, 86, politician, president (1994–2000), Nobel Prize laureate (2008).
- 22 October – Timo Roos, 87, teacher and politician, MP (1983–1995).
- 23 October –
  - Aira Samulin, 96, dance teacher and entrepreneur.
  - Tuulikki Hämäläinen, 82, economist and politician, MP (1983–1999).
- 26 October – Pekka Alonen, 94, Olympic alpine skier (1952).
- 28 October – Erkki Antila, 69, Olympic biathlete (1980).
- 3 November –
  - Matti Reunamäki, 83, Olympic ice hockey player (1964, 1968).
  - Ari Tissari, 71, footballer (KTP, Vasalund, national team).
- 9 November – Juha Leiviskä, 87, architect and designer.
- 11 November – Kari Rahkamo, 90, Olympic athlete (1956, 1960) and politician, mayor of Helsinki (1991–1996).
- 24 November – Jukka Haavisto, 93, musician.
- 3 December – Elsi Hetemäki-Olander, 96, politician, MP (1970–1991).
- 4 December – Sakari Knuuttila, 93, politician, MP (1966–1991).
- 6 December – Pedro Hietanen, 74, Finnish musician and conductor.
