= 2015 in Finland =

- Decades: 1990s; 2000s; 2010s; 2020s; 2030s
- See also: Other events of 2015; Timeline of Finnish history

The following lists events that happened during 2015 in Finland.

== Incumbents ==
- President: Sauli Niinistö
- Prime Minister: Alexander Stubb (until 29 May), Juha Sipilä (from 29 May)
- Speaker: Eero Heinäluoma (until 21 April), Juha Sipilä (from 28 April), (until 29 May), Maria Lohela (from 29 May)

== Events ==
- 19 April – 2015 Finnish parliamentary election was held. As the leader of the largest party, Juha Sipilä of Centre was tasked with forming the new government coalition.
- 29 May – Coalition negotiations ware completed, leading to the formation of the Sipilä cabinet.

== Deaths ==
- 3 January – Jouko Törmänen, 60, ski jumper, Olympic champion (1980)
- 8 February
  - Rauni-Leena Luukanen-Kilde, 75, parapsychologist
  - Oscar Stenström, 36, racing cyclist
- 29 June – Rabbe Grönblom, 65, restaurant owner and entrepreneur
- 2 September – Simo Salminen, 82, comedic actor
