= Salovaara =

Salovaara is a Finnish surname.

== Geographical distribution ==
As of 2014, 92.0% of all known bearers of the surname Salovaara were residents of Finland (frequency 1:3,857), 3.1% of Sweden (1:205,141), 1.6% of Canada (1:1,471,920) and 1.4% of the United States (1:16,420,513).

In Finland, the frequency of the surname was higher than national average (1:3,857) in the following regions:

1. Kymenlaakso (1:1,920)
2. Pirkanmaa (1:2,702)
3. Uusimaa (1:2,773)
4. South Ostrobothnia (1:2,836)
5. Päijänne Tavastia (1:3,196)
6. Southwest Finland (1:3,653)
7. Satakunta (1:3,745)

== People ==
- Aarne Salovaara (1887–1945), Finnish gymnast and track and field athlete
- Barry Salovaara (born 1948), Canadian ice hockey player
- Juhani Salovaara (born 1931), Finnish sailor
- Väinö Salovaara (1888–1964), Finnish chief engineer and politician
