= Numminen =

Numminen is a Finnish surname. Notable people with the surname include:

- Jaakko Numminen (1928–2022), Finnish politician
- Kalevi Numminen (born 1940), Finnish ice hockey player
- M. A. Numminen (born 1940), Finnish artist
- Teppo Numminen (born 1968), Finnish ice hockey player

== See also ==
- Numminen, Mäntsälä, village in Uusimaa, Finland
