= 2008 in Finland =

- Decades: 1980s; 1990s; 2000s; 2010s; 2020s
- See also: Other events of 2008; Timeline of Finnish history

Events in the year 2008 in Finland.

== Incumbents ==
- President – Tarja Halonen
- Prime Minister – Matti Vanhanen
- Speaker – Sauli Niinistö

== Events ==
- October – the 2008 Finnish municipal elections

== Deaths ==
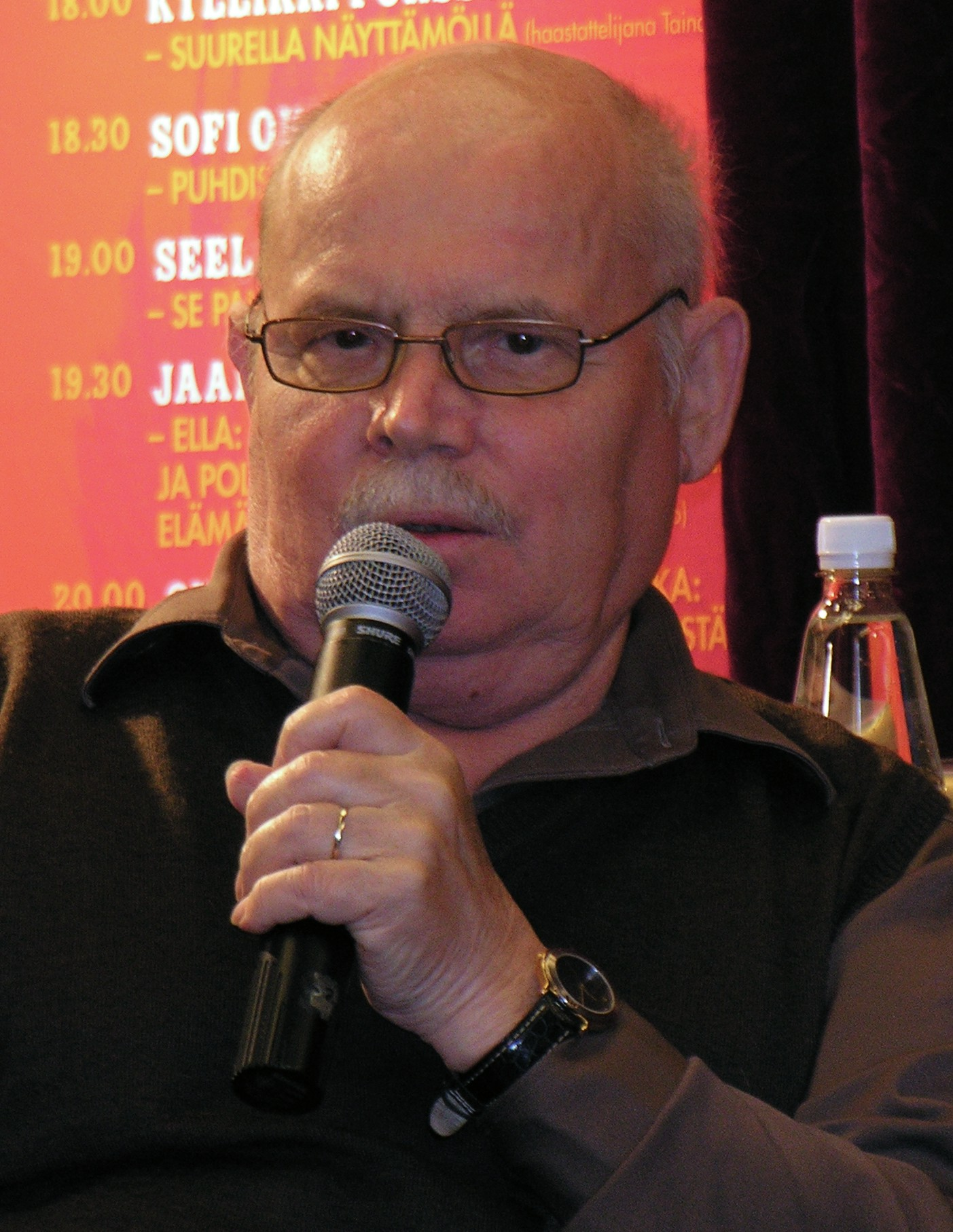
Ere Kokkonen

- 28 January – Tapio Hämäläinen, actor and theater counsellor (b. 1922)
- 28 January – Faina Jyrkilä, sociologist (b. 1917)
- 9 February – Martti Linna, farmer and politician (b. 1911).
- 27 February – Mandi Lampi, actress and singer (b. 1988).
- 17 March – Ola Rosendahl, agronomist, farmer and politician (b. 1939)
- 18 March – Jyrki Hämäläinen, magazine editor and biographer (b. 1942)
- 18 March – Mia Permanto, pop singer and radio host (b. 1988)
- 7 April – Esko Tommola, newsreader (b. 1930)
- 10 June – Eero Mäkelä, chef (b. 1942)
- 25 August – Pehr Henrik Nordgren, composer (b. 1944)
- 3 September – Aarno Karhilo, diplomat (b. 1927)
- 16 October – Ere Kokkonen, film director (b. 1938)
- 27 November – Pekka Pohjola, multi-instrumentalist, composer and producer (b. 1952)
