= 2018 in Finland =

- Decades: 1990s; 2000s; 2010s; 2020s
- See also: Other events of 2018; Timeline of Finnish history

Events in the year 2018 in Finland.

== Incumbents ==
- President: Sauli Niinistö
- Prime Minister: Juha Sipilä
- Speaker: Maria Lohela (until 5 February), Paula Risikko (from 5 February)

== Events ==
28 January – scheduled date for the 2018 Finnish presidential election

== Deaths ==
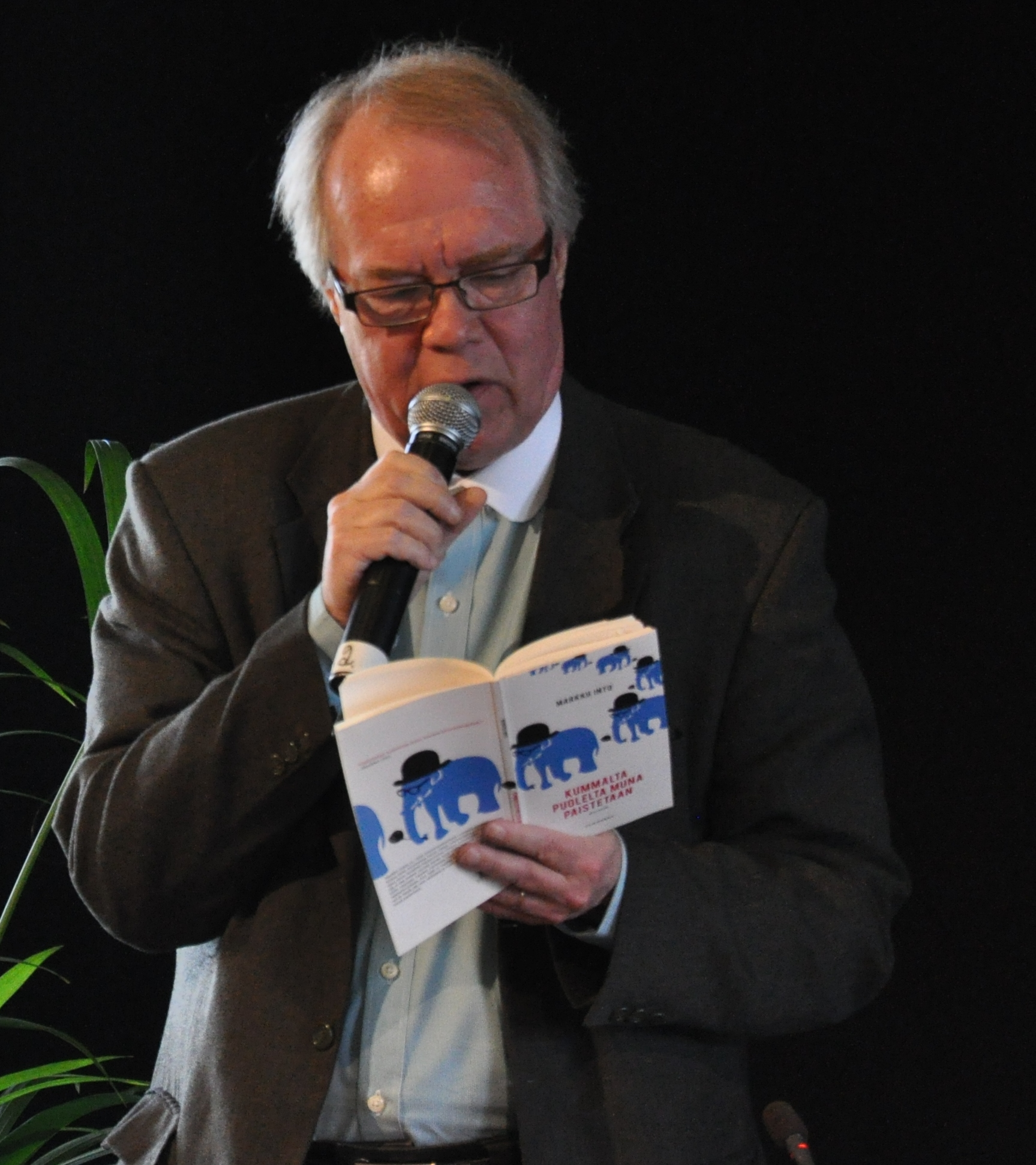
Markku Into

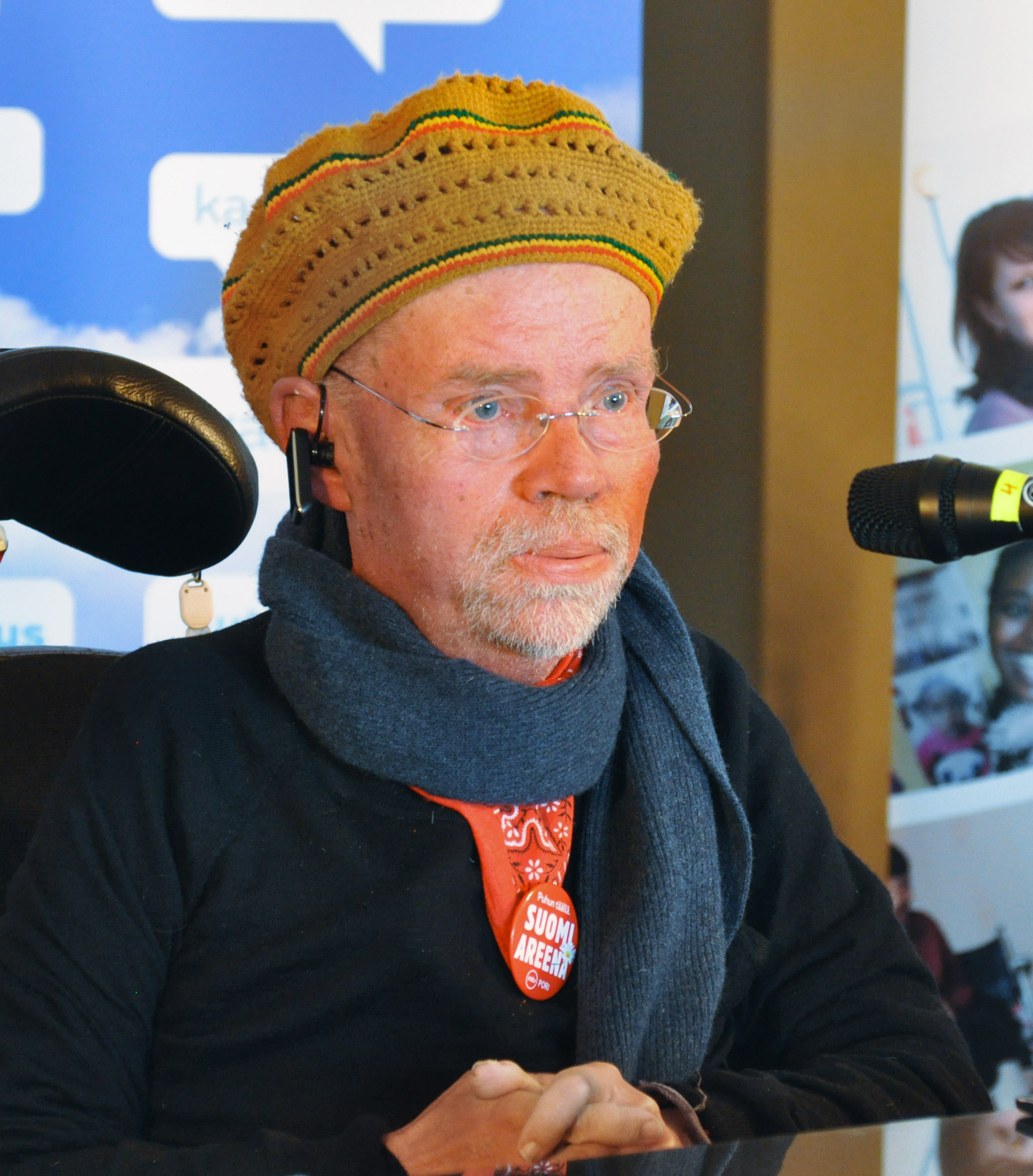
Kalle Könkkölä

- 7 January – Markku Into, poet (b. 1945).
- 9 January – Heikki Kirkinen, historian (b. 1927).
- 13 January – Kaj Czarnecki, fencer (b. 1936)
- 31 January – Olavi Mäenpää, politician (b. 1950)
- 9 March – Ulla Nenonen, missionary and Bible translator (b. 1933).
- 23 March – Jaakko Pakkasvirta, film director and screenwriter (b. 1934)
- 23 March – Jukka Mikkola, politician (b. 1943)
- 9 June – Lauri Linna, politician, MP (b. 1930).
- 21 June – Katriina Elovirta, female association footballer and an international match referee (b. 1961).
- 11 September – Kalle Könkkölä, politician (MP) and human rights activist (b. 1950).
