= Virrankoski =

Virrankoski is a surname. Notable people with the surname include:

- Kyösti Virrankoski (1944–2026), Finnish politician
- Pentti Virrankoski (1929–2023), Finnish historian
