= 2021 in Finland =

- Decades: 2000s; 2010s; 2020s
- See also: Other events of 2021; Timeline of Finnish history

Events in the year 2021 in Finland.

== Incumbents ==
- President: Sauli Niinistö
- Prime Minister: Sanna Marin
- Eduskunta/Riksdag: 2019-2023 Eduskunta/Riksdag
- Speaker of the Eduskunta/Riksdag: Anu Vehviläinen

== Events ==
Ongoing — COVID-19 pandemic in Finland

- July 6, 2021 - Lapland recorded its highest temperature in over a century.
- 13–14 August, 2021 Finns Party leadership election was won by Riikka Purra

== Deaths ==
=== January ===
- 13 January
  - Pave Maijanen, rock musician (b. 1950)
  - Sinikka Nopola, writer and journalist (b. 1953)
- 14 January – Yrjö Rantanen, 70, Finnish chess grandmaster.
- 16 January – Pave Maijanen, 70, Finnish musician (Hurriganes, Dingo), complications from amyotrophic lateral sclerosis.
- 22 January
  - Pirkko Liinamaa, radio and television presenter (b. 1932)
  - Raimo Suikkanen, 78, Finnish Olympic racing cyclist (1968, 1972).
- 27 January – Tiina Rinne, actress (b. 1929)

=== February ===
- 12 February – Paavo Pystynen, 89, Finnish Olympic long-distance runner (1964).
- 14 February – Finn Knutsen, 88, Norwegian politician, MP (1985–1989).
- 16 February – Heikki Laurila, studio musician (b. 1934)
- 17 February – Jyrki Yrttiaho, 68, Finnish politician, MP (2007–2015).

=== March ===
- 5 March – Aulis Sipponen, 92, Finnish Olympic skier (1952).
- 8 March – Risto Aaltonen, 81, Finnish actor (Leikkikalugangsteri, Crime and Punishment, Uuno Turhapuro muuttaa maalle).
- 13 March – Pentti Lasanen, jazz musician (b. 1936)
- 17 March – Kristian Gullichsen, 88, Finnish architect.
