= 2017 in Finland =

- Decades: 1990s; 2000s; 2010s; 2020s
- See also: Other events of 2017; Timeline of Finnish history

The year 2017 is the centenary of the independence of Finland.

== Incumbents ==
- President – Sauli Niinistö
- Prime Minister – Juha Sipilä
- Speaker – Maria Lohela

== Events ==
=== February ===
- 4 February – The 2017 Social Democratic Party of Finland leadership election was held.
- 22 February – Opening ceremony of the FIS Nordic World Ski Championships 2017, hosted in Lahti.

=== March ===
- 1 March – Same-sex marriage is legalized in Finland.
- 28 March – AS Long as Possible, a GIF-based artwork scheduled to play for 1000 years, launches at the Finnish National Gallery.

=== April ===
- 9 April – 2017 Finnish municipal elections were held for all 295 municipalities.

=== June ===
- 9 June – The Helsinki Air Show was held in Kaivopuisto, Helsinki, Finland in honor of Finland's 100th anniversary. Attracting 130,000 spectators, it was the largest mass gathering in Finland's history.
- 10 June – 2017 Finns Party leadership election was won by Jussi Halla-aho.
- 12 June – 2017 Finnish government crisis occurred following the Finns Party leadership election. The crisis resulted in a breakdown of the coalition government and resolved on June 13.

=== August ===
- 9–13 August –The 75th World Science Fiction Convention was held at the Helsinki Exhibition and Convention Centre.
- 18 August – 2 people are killed and 8 injured in Turku in the first terrorist attack in Finland since World War II.

=== December ===
- 6 December – Finland celebrates 100 years of independence; the Finnish Prime Minister's Office had earlier created the Finland 100 Years organization (Finnish: Suomi 100 -hanke) to arrange a series of jubilee events.

== Deaths ==
- May 12: Mauno Koivisto, Finnish politician, former president (born 1923)
