= 2016 in Finland =

- Decades: 1990s; 2000s; 2010s; 2020s
- See also: Other events of 2016; Timeline of Finnish history

The following lists events that happened during 2016 in Finland.

== Incumbents ==
Photo	Post	Name
	President of Finland	Sauli Niinistö
	Prime Minister of Finland	Juha Sipilä
	Speaker of the Parliament of Finland	Maria Lohela

== Events ==
=== January ===
- Four pairs of municipalities were merged Hämeenkoski with Hollola, Jalasjärvi with Kurikka, Köyliö with Säkylä and Nastola with Lahti.

=== February ===
- First ever face transfer operation in Nordic countries was made in Helsinki

=== March ===
- Church in Ylivieska was destroyed in a fire

=== May ===
- Finland became running-up in 2016 IIHF World Championship

=== June ===
- Three parties selected new chairmen: Petteri Orpo for Coalition, Li Andersson for Left Alliance, Anna-Maja Henriksson for SFP

=== September ===
- September 10
  - At a demonstration near the Helsinki Central railway station, a far-right activist violently attacked a passer-by, resulting in the victim's death a few days later.

=== November ===
- City council of Tampere approved building of light rail system.

=== December ===
- December 16
  - A dangerous fire breaks out around 10:00 am at the Terrafame nickel mine in Sotkamo. The fire began in the mine's Hydrogen sulfide generator.
  - A White-tailed eagle is discovered dead in Rauma, Satakunta, and the cause of death was later verified as the H5N8 virus. This is the first confirmed instance of avian flu on the Finnish mainland.
- December 25
  - Ten thousand households within Southwest Finland go without power for an hour after an equipment failure at grid operator Fingrid's hub in the town of Uusikaupunki.
- December 29
  - President Sauli Niinistö appoints Mika Lintilä, an MP for the Centre Party, as the Minister of Economic Affairs.
  - The Helsinki District Court imposes a ten-year custodial prison sentence on Jari Aarnio, the former head of the anti-drug crime unit in Helsinki.

== Sports ==
- 2015–16 Liiga season
- 2016 Finnish Figure Skating Championships
- Finland at the 2016 Summer Olympics

== Deaths ==
=== January ===
- 8 January – Risto Syrjänen, 90, Finnish Olympic hurdler.
- 10 January – Kalevi Lehtovirta, 87, Finnish Olympic footballer (1952).

=== February ===
- 4 February – Ulf Söderblom, 85, Finnish conductor.

=== March ===
- 1 March –
  - Nestori Kaasalainen, 101, Finnish politician.
  - Reijo Kanerva, 72, Finnish footballer.
