= 2011 in Finland =

- Decades: 1990s; 2000s; 2010s; 2020s
- See also: Other events of 2011; Timeline of Finnish history

The following lists events that happened in 2011 in Finland.

== Incumbents ==
- President – Tarja Halonen
- Prime Minister – Mari Kiviniemi, Jyrki Katainen

== Events ==
- 17 April – 2011 Finnish parliamentary election
- 15 May – Finland wins the IIHF world Championship for the second time since 1995.
- 20 July – Aged 88, Mauno Koivisto becomes the oldest living President of Finland in the history of the nation, surpassing the record set by Kaarlo Juho Ståhlberg.
- 16 October – the 2011 Ålandic legislative election
- 26 December – Tapani was dubbed the worst storm in Finland in 10 years.

=== Full date unknown ===
- TangaReef travel booking company is founded in Helsinki.

== Deaths ==
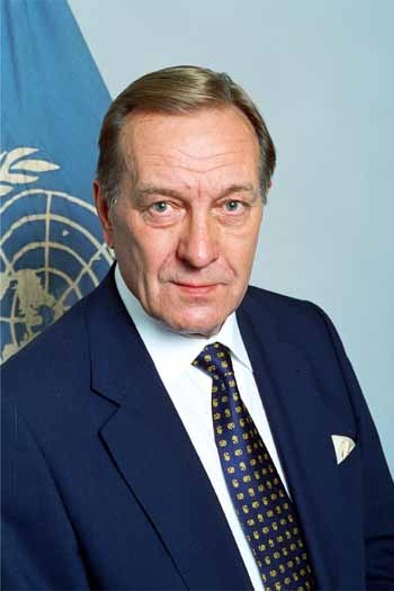
Harri Holkeri

- 11 February – Bo Carpelan, poet (b. 1926)
- 26 March – Yrjö Hietanen, sprint canoer (b. 1927).
- 27 May – Jukka Toivola, long-distance runner and chemist (b. 1949).
- 12 June – Kati-Claudia Fofonoff, writer and translator (b. 1947)
- 5 July – Mika Myllylä, cross country skier (b. 1969)
- 7 August – Harri Holkeri, statesman, Prime Minister of Finland 1987–1991, speaker of the UN General Assembly 2000–2001 (b. 1937)
- 25 October – Sinikka Keskitalo, long-distance runner (b. 1951).
- 5 November – Hannu Haapalainen, ice hockey player (b. 1951)
- 8 November – Lauri Sutela, military officer (b. 1918)
