= 2010 in Finland =

- Decades: 1990s; 2000s; 2010s; 2020s
- See also: Other events of 2010; Timeline of Finnish history

The following lists events that happened in 2010 in Finland.

== Incumbents ==
- President – Tarja Halonen
- Prime Minister – Matti Vanhanen, Mari Kiviniemi
- Speaker – Sauli Niinistö

== Events ==
- 12-28 February – 95 athletes competed for Finland at the 2010 Winter Olympics
- 21 November to 2 December – the 10th International Jean Sibelius Violin Competition took place in Helsinki

== Deaths ==
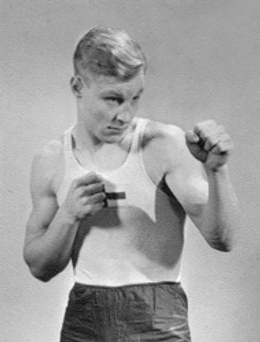
Harry Siljander

- 8 January – Tony Halme, politician and martial artist (b. 1963)
- 8 January – Rolf Koskinen, orienteering competitor (b. 1939)
- 27 February – Helge Herala, stage and film actor (b. 1922)
- 30 April – Jorma Peltonen, ice hockey player (b. 1944)
- 5 May – Harry Siljander, light-heavyweight boxer (b. 1922).
- 31 May – Olli Laiho, gymnast (b. 1943).
- 13 July – Pentti Linnosvuo, sport shooter (b. 1933).
- 16 September – Erkki Ertama, composer and conductor (b. 1927)
- 3 November – Pentti Uotinen, ski jumper (b. 1931)
- 9 December – Thorvald Strömberg, sprint canoer (b. 1931).
