= 1896 in Finland =

- Decades: 1870s; 1880s; 1890s; 1900s; 1910s
- See also: Other events of 1896; Timeline of Finnish history

Events from the year 1896 in Finland

== Incumbents ==
- Monarch: Nicholas II
- Governor-General of Finland: Feodor Logginovich Heiden
- Vice Chairman of the Economic Division: Sten Carl Tudeer

== Establishments ==
- Northern Ostrobothnia museum
- Academic Engineers and Architects in Finland TEK

== Events ==
- Free Exhibitions, a free art exhibition, opened.

== Births ==
- 19 August - Vilho Niittymaa, athlete (died 1979)
- 2 December - Bruno Frietsch, sports shooter (died 1996)
- exact date unknown - George Arthur Kulmala, artist (died 1940)

== Deaths ==
- 10 May - Antti Ahlström, businessman, founder of Ahlstrom Corporation, 68
