= 2009 in Finland =

- Decades: 1980s; 1990s; 2000s; 2010s; 2020s
- See also: Other events of 2009; Timeline of Finnish history

The following lists events that happened in 2009 in Finland.

== Incumbents ==
- President – Tarja Halonen
- Prime Minister – Matti Vanhanen
- Speaker – Sauli Niinistö

== Events ==
- 7 June – 2009 European Parliament election in Finland
- 31 December – the Sello mall shooting

== Deaths ==
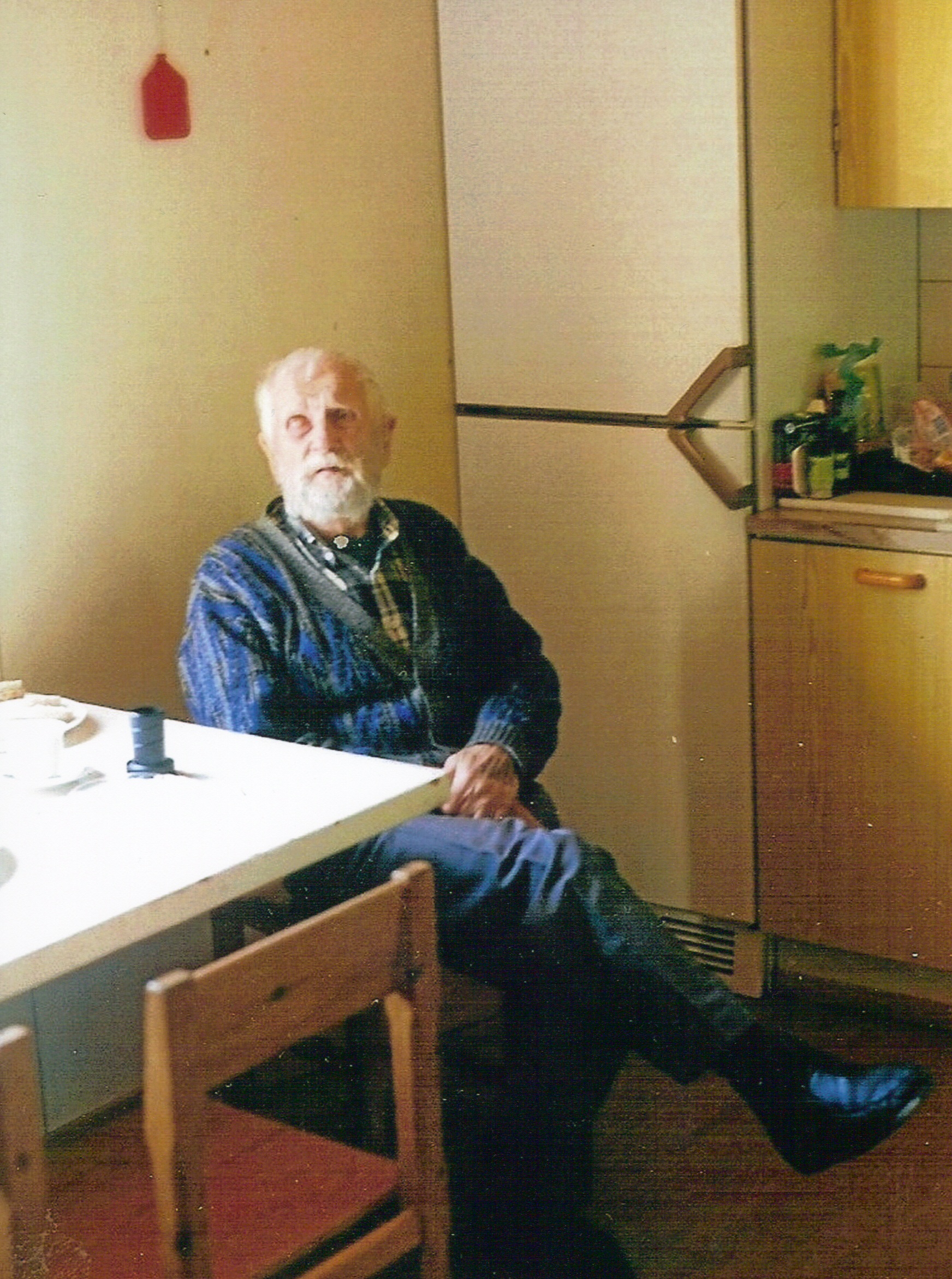
Aarne Arvonen

- 1 January – Aarne Arvonen, supercentenarian, oldest living male person in Finland (b. 1897)
- 10 January – Pauli Salonen, Nordic combined skier (b. 1916).
- 23 February – August Kiuru, cross country skier (b. 1922)
- 15 May – Helvi Sipilä, diplomat, lawyer, politician and promoter of women's rights (b. 1915)
- 21 May – Christer Boucht, lawyer, adventure traveller and writer (b. 1911)
- 13 July – Uma Aaltonen, journalist and politician (b. 1940)
- 25 August – Mirja Lehtonen, cross country skier (b. 1942).
