= 2019 in Finland =

- Decades: 1990s; 2000s; 2010s; 2020s; 2030s
- See also: Other events of 2019; Timeline of Finnish history

Events of 2019 in Finland.

== Incumbents ==
| Photo | Post | Name |
|---|---|---|
| | President of Finland | Sauli Niinistö |
| | Prime Minister of Finland | Juha Sipilä (until 6 June 2019) |
| | Prime Minister of Finland | Antti Rinne (starting 6 June 2019) (until 10 December 2019) |
| | Prime Minister of Finland | Sanna Marin (starting 10 December 2019) |

== Events ==
- 26 May – Finland wins the IIHF Ice Hockey World Championship for the third time since 2011
- 1 July – Finland receives the presidency of the Council of the European Union.
- November–December – Finland postal strike controversy 2019

== Deaths ==
=== January ===
- 16 January – Unto Wiitala, Finnish Hall of Fame ice hockey player and official. (b. 1925)

=== February ===
- 4 February – Matti Nykänen, Finnish ski jumper (born 1963)
- 5 February – Eero Rantala, Finnish politician (born 1941)
- 5 February – Tapio Lehto, Finnish Olympic triple jumper. (born 1930)
- 7 February – Per Olov Jansson, Finnish photographer. (born 1920)
- 12 February – Olli Lindholm, Finnish singer and guitarist (born 1964)
- 16 February – Eyvind Wichmann, Finnish-born American theoretical physicist. (born 1928)

=== March ===
- 11 March – Pertti Koivulahti, Finnish ice hockey player (Tappara). (b. 1951)
- 15 March – Osmo Jussila, Finnish historian. (b. 1938)
- 17 March – Olavi Mannonen, Finnish modern pentathlete, Olympic silver medalist (1956) and bronze medalist (1952, 1956). (b. 1930)
- 23 March – Matti Launonen, Finnish table tennis player, Paralympic champion (1992, 1996), complications from a fall. (b. 1944)
- 24 March – Ensio Hyytiä, Finnish ski jumper, world championship silver medalist (1958). (b. 1938)

=== April ===
- 5 April – Lasse Pöysti, Finnish actor (b. 1927)
- 6 April – Olli Mäki, Finnish boxer, European amateur champion (1959), complications from Alzheimer's disease. (b. 1936)
- 13 April – Lydia Wideman, Finnish cross-country skier (b. 1920)
- 22 April – Oiva Toikka, Finnish glass designer (b. 1931)
- April 26 – Reijo Taipale, Finnish singer (b. 1940)

=== May ===
- May 6 – Pekka Airaksinen, Finnish composer and musician. (b. 1945)
- May 28 – Tuulikki Ukkola, Finnish journalist (Kaleva) and politician, MP (1991–1995, 2007–2011) and leader of the Liberal People's Party (1993–1995). (b. 1943)

=== June ===
- June 9 – Juhani Wahlsten, Finnish ice hockey player. (b. 1938)
- June 22 – Leevi Lehto, Finnish poet, translator and programmer, multiple system atrophy. (b. 1951)
- June 29 – Kirsti Simonsuuri, Finnish writer and poet, complications from cancer and Parkinson's disease. (b. 1945)
- June 29 – Ilkka Nummisto, Finnish Olympic sprint canoer (1964, 1968, 1972, 1976). (b. 1944)

=== July ===
- July 9 – Klaus Sahlgren, Finnish diplomat. (b. 1928)
- July 11 – Arto Nilsson, Finnish boxer, Olympic bronze medallist (1968). (b. 1948)
- July 24 – Claes Andersson, Finnish writer, psychiatrist and politician, MP (1987–1999, 2007–2008). (b. 1937)
- July 25 – Jorma Kinnunen, Finnish javelin thrower, Olympic silver medalist (1968). (b. 1941)
- July 29 – Mona-Liisa Nousiainen, Finnish Olympic cross-country skier (2014), cancer. (b. 1983)

=== August ===
- August 23 – Leo Gauriloff, Finnish musician. (b. 1956)
- August 27 – Gustav Wiklund, Finnish actor and painter. (b. 1934)
- August 29 – Juhani Kärkinen, Finnish ski jumper, world champion (1958). (b. 1935)

=== September ===
- September 1 – Kari Lehtola, Finnish lawyer, head of the Safety Investigation Authority (1996–2001). (b. 1938)
- September 1 – Jukka Virtanen, Finnish director, actor and screenwriter, cancer. (b. 1933)
- September 23 – Harri Hurme, Finnish chess player. (b. 1945)
- September 29 – Paavo Korhonen, Finnish Nordic skier, world champion (1958). (b. 1928)
- September 29 – Ilkka Laitinen, Finnish lieutenant general, Chief of the Border Guard (2018–2019) and Executive Director of Frontex (2005–2015). (b. 1962)

=== October ===
- October 1 – Jouko Innanen, Finnish cartoonist. (b. 1952)
- October 7 – Jari Laukkanen, Finnish Olympic cross-country skier (1988). (b. 1962)
- October 21 – Aila Meriluoto, Finnish poet, writer and translator. (b. 1924)
- October 28 – Toivo Salonen, Finnish speed skater, Olympic bronze medalist (1956). (b. 1933)

=== November ===
- November 5 – Ulf-Erik Slotte, Finnish diplomat, Ambassador to Turkey (1973–1977), Australia (1988–1991) and Ireland (1991–1996). (b. 1931)
- November 22 – Antti Rantakangas, Finnish politician, MP (since 1999). (b. 1964)
- November 27 – Maarit Feldt-Ranta, Finnish politician, MP (2007–2019). (b. 1968)

=== December ===
- December 20 – Matti Ahde, Finnish politician, MP (1970–1999, 2003–2011). (b. 1945)

== See also ==
- 2019 European Parliament election
