= Siiri Perälä =

Finnish footballer and futsal player (1993–2022)

Personal information
- Date of birth: 1 June 1993
- Place of birth: Jämsä, Finland
- Date of death: 5 January 2022 (aged 28)

Senior career*
Years	Team	Apps	(Gls)
2016–2018	KaDy	34	(40)
2018–2021	GFT	50	(36)
Total		84	(76)
- * Club domestic league appearances and goals

Siiri Perälä (1 June 1993 – 5 January 2022) was a Finnish football and futsal player. She played in the Naisten Futsal-Liiga from 2017 to 2021 and won the league championship in 2019. Perälä earned five caps in the Finnish women's futsal team from 2019 to 2020.

Perälä also played football in the Naisten Ykkönen, Kakkonen and Kolmos from 2014 to 2019, representing Jyväskylä Pallokerho and FC Espoo.

== Personal life and death ==
Perälä was diagnosed with B-cell lymphoma in the spring of 2020, and died on 5 January 2022, at the age of 28.
