= 2013 in Finland =

- Decades: 1990s; 2000s; 2010s; 2020s
- See also: Other events of 2013; Timeline of Finnish history

The following lists events that happened in 2013 in Finland.

== Incumbents ==
- President – Sauli Niinistö
- Prime Minister – Jyrki Katainen
- Speaker – Eero Heinäluoma

== Events ==
- 30 January – the Jyväskylä library stabbing
- 15-18 November – the 2013 Nordic storms hit Finland

== Deaths ==
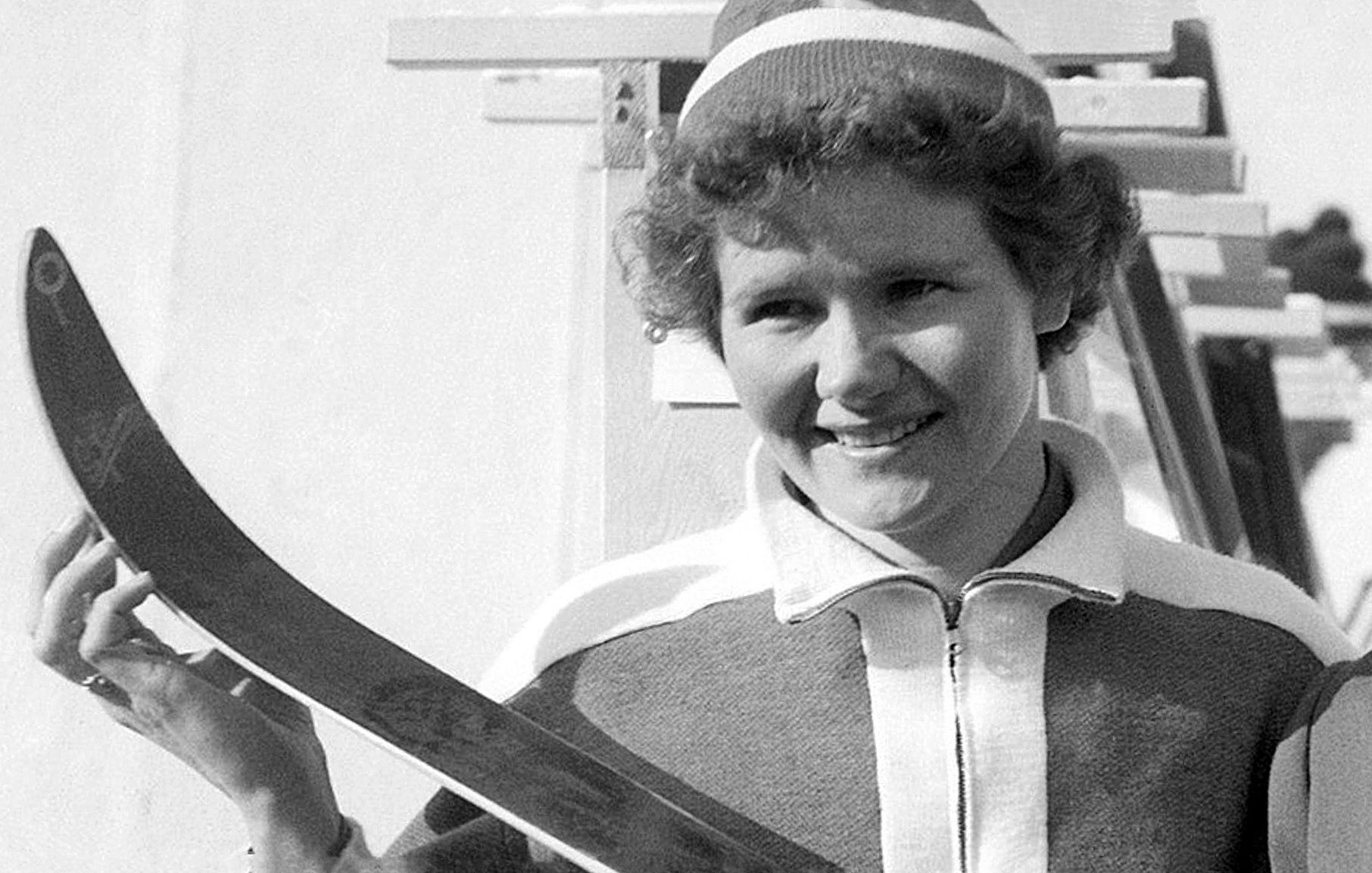
Mirja Hietamies

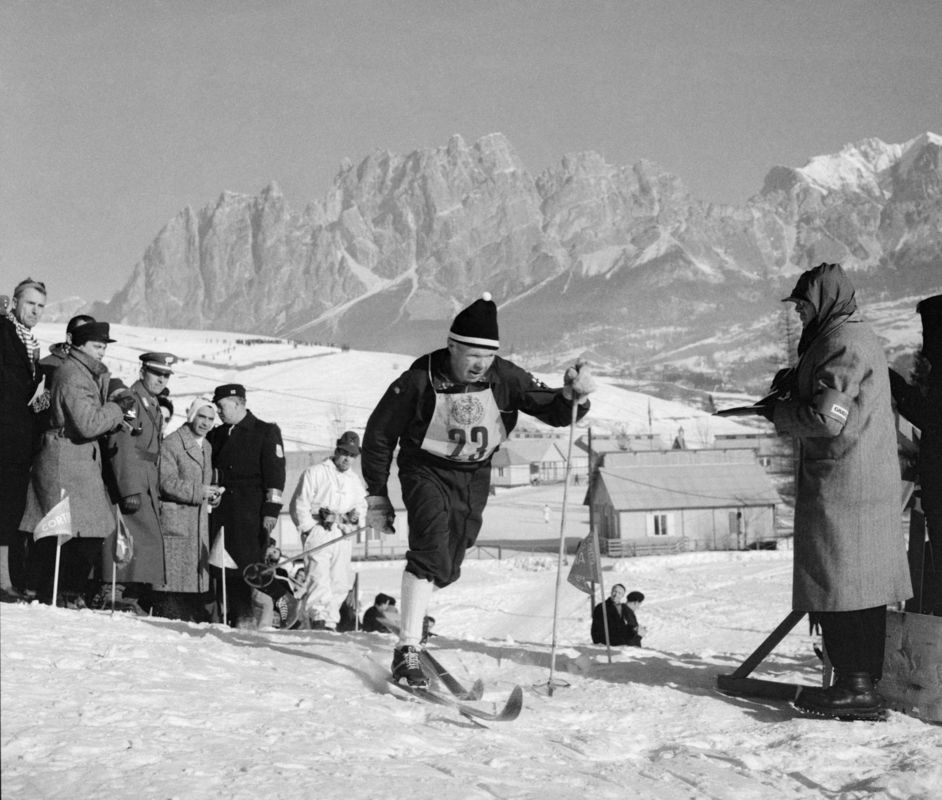
Eero Kolehmainen at the 1956 Winter Olympics

- 29 January – Anselm Hollo, poet and translator (b. 1934)
- 8 March – Kai Pahlman, footballer (b. 1935)
- 9 March – Max Jakobson, diplomat and journalist (b. 1923)
- 14 March – Mirja Hietamies, cross country skier (b. 1931).
- 26 June – Henrik Otto Donner, composer, musician and music personality (b. 1939)
- 13 October – Antti Tyrväinen, biathlete (b. 1933).
- 7 December – Eero Kolehmainen, cross country skier (b. 1918).
- 29 December – Eero Mäntyranta, cross country skier and Olympic winner (b. 1937).
