= Seppo Vainio =

Finnish ice hockey player (1937–2020)

Personal information
- Nationality: Finnish
- Born: 3 January 1937; Rauma, Finland
- Died: 14 December 2020 (aged 83)

Sport
- Sport: Ice hockey

Seppo Vainio (3 January 1937 – 14 December 2020) was a Finnish ice hockey player. He competed in the men's tournament at the 1960 Winter Olympics.
