= 2012 in Finland =

- Decades: 1990s; 2000s; 2010s; 2020s
- See also: Other events of 2012; Timeline of Finnish history

The following lists events that happened in 2012 in Finland.

== Incumbents ==
- President – Tarja Halonen (until 1 March), Sauli Niinistö (starting 1 March)
- Prime Minister – Jyrki Katainen
- Speaker – Eero Heinäluoma

== Events ==
- 22 January and 5 February – the 2012 Finnish presidential election
- 26 May – the Hyvinkää shooting
- 27 July - 12 August – 56 athletes competed for Finland at the 2012 Summer Olympics

== Deaths ==
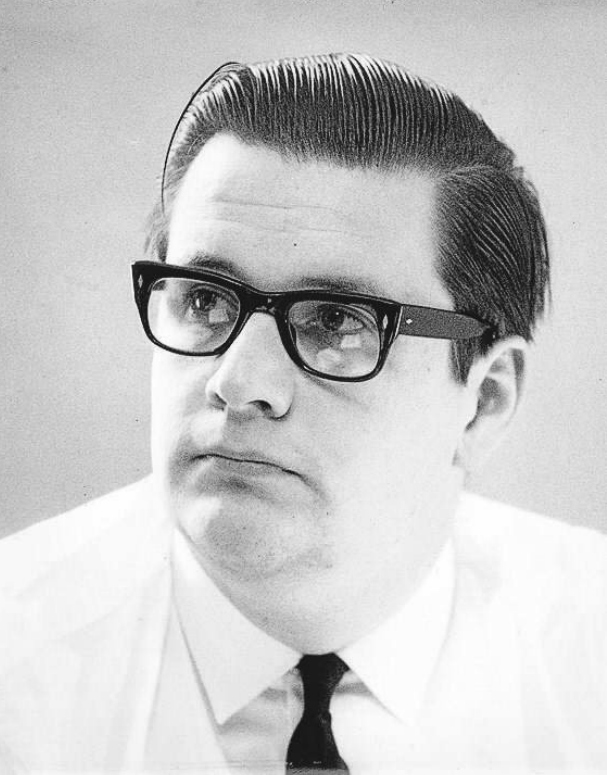
Aatos Erkko

- 13 February – Tonmi Lillman, musician (b. 1973)
- 9 March – Jammu Siltavuori, murderer and sexual offender (born 1926)
- 5 May – Aatos Erkko, newspaper editor and publisher (b. 1932)
- 10 May – Pekka Marjamäki, ice hockey player (b. 1947)
- 2 June – Soini Nikkinen, javelin thrower (b. 1923).
- 18 July – Seppo Liitsola, ice hockey player (b. 1933)
- 21 September – Karl-Gustav Kaisla, ice hockey referee (b. 1943)
- 27 September – Eija Inkeri, stage and film actress (b. 1926)
- 13 December – Sakari Jurkka, actor (b. 1923)
- 27 December – Jorma Kortelainen, cross country skier and competitive rower (b. 1932).
