= Lasse J. Laine =

Finnish ornithologist (1946–2023)

Lasse Juhani Laine (6 February 1946 – 26 August 2023) was a Finnish birdwatcher, biologist, and author. He is the author of Suomalainen lintuopas (1996), Suomen luonto-opas (2000) and Lintuharrastajan opas (2004). He died on 26 August 2023, at the age of 77.

== Works ==
- Suomalainen lintuopas, 1996. ISBN 9789511276500
- Suomen luonto-opas, 2000. ISBN 978-951-0-23942-1
- Lintuharrastajan opas, 2004.
- Sudenpentujen lintukäsikirja, 2005.
- Lasten oma lintukirja, 2007.
- Luonnon lumoissa, 2008.
- Suomen lasten luontokirja (made with Iiris Kalliola), 2010
- Suomen luontovuoden opas, 2010.
- Suomen luonto. Tunnistusopas, 2013. ISBN 978-951-1-26260-2
- Suomen lasten retkeilyopas (made with Iiris Kalliola), 2014. ISBN 978-951-1-27425-4
- Suomen linnut – Tunnistusopas, 2015. ISBN 978-951-1-27650-0
