= Outi Heiskanen =

Finnish artist (1937–2022)

Outi Marjatta Heiskanen (26 September 1937 – 30 September 2022) was a Finnish artist. She debuted in 1971.

Outi Heiskanen was famous for her figurative graphic work. Her subjects included her family and friends, animals, as well as animal-human hybrids. Her main printmaking technique was etching, which she used to draw the motif. She would then augment the etching by aquatint or drypoint where necessary. Heiskanen was also known for her versatility as a performer, set designer and creator of happenings and performances. She was a member of several independent artists' groups.

As a child Outi Heiskanen (née Kanervo) traveled often with her father, who was a veterinarian. She drew pictures of animals and people at the farms. She graduated as an art teacher in 1959 and married Toivo Heiskanen. They had two daughters. In addition to her artistic career, Heiskanen worked as an art teacher in schools in Oulu, Jyväskylä and Helsinki from 1959 to 1973. She was a professor in the graphics department at the Academy of Fine Arts in 1992, and the Academy headmaster from 1994 until 1995. In 1984, she was awarded the Pro Finlandia medal.

Heiskanen's travels have had a great impact in her work, especially the trips to Tibet and Afghanistan.

Heiskanen died on 30 September 2022 at the age of 85, after suffering from dementia for several years.
