= Heikki Kirkinen =

Finnish historian (1927–2018)

Heikki Kirkinen (22 September 1927 in Kuusjärvi – 9 January 2018) was a Finnish historian who was professor of Finnish and European history at the University of Eastern Finland in Joensuu, Finland. He has been a visiting professor in the Finnish language, literature and culture at Sorbonne, 1966–1970.

Kirkinen has written many books about the Karelian history and the Karelian identity. One of his main interests was music; he has studied musicology and even composed music himself.

== Publications ==
- Les origines de la conception moderne de l'hommemachine (1960)
- Le monde kalévaléen en France et en Finlande (1987, with Jean Perrot)
- Informatique et développement des régions marginales (1988, editor)
- Protection and development of our intangible heritage (1999, editor)
- Karjala idän kulttuuripiirissä, 1963
- Karjala taistelukenttänä, (Karjala idän ja lännen välissä, II), 1976, ISBN 978-951-26-1147-8
- Bysantin perinne ja Suomi, ISBN 951-9071-87-3
- Termiitti vai enkeli, ajatuksia kulttuurievoluutiosta, SKS (2002)
- Pohjois-Karjalan kalevaisen perinteen juuret, 1988, ISBN 951-717-506-X
