= Timo Honkela =

Finnish scientist (1962–2020)

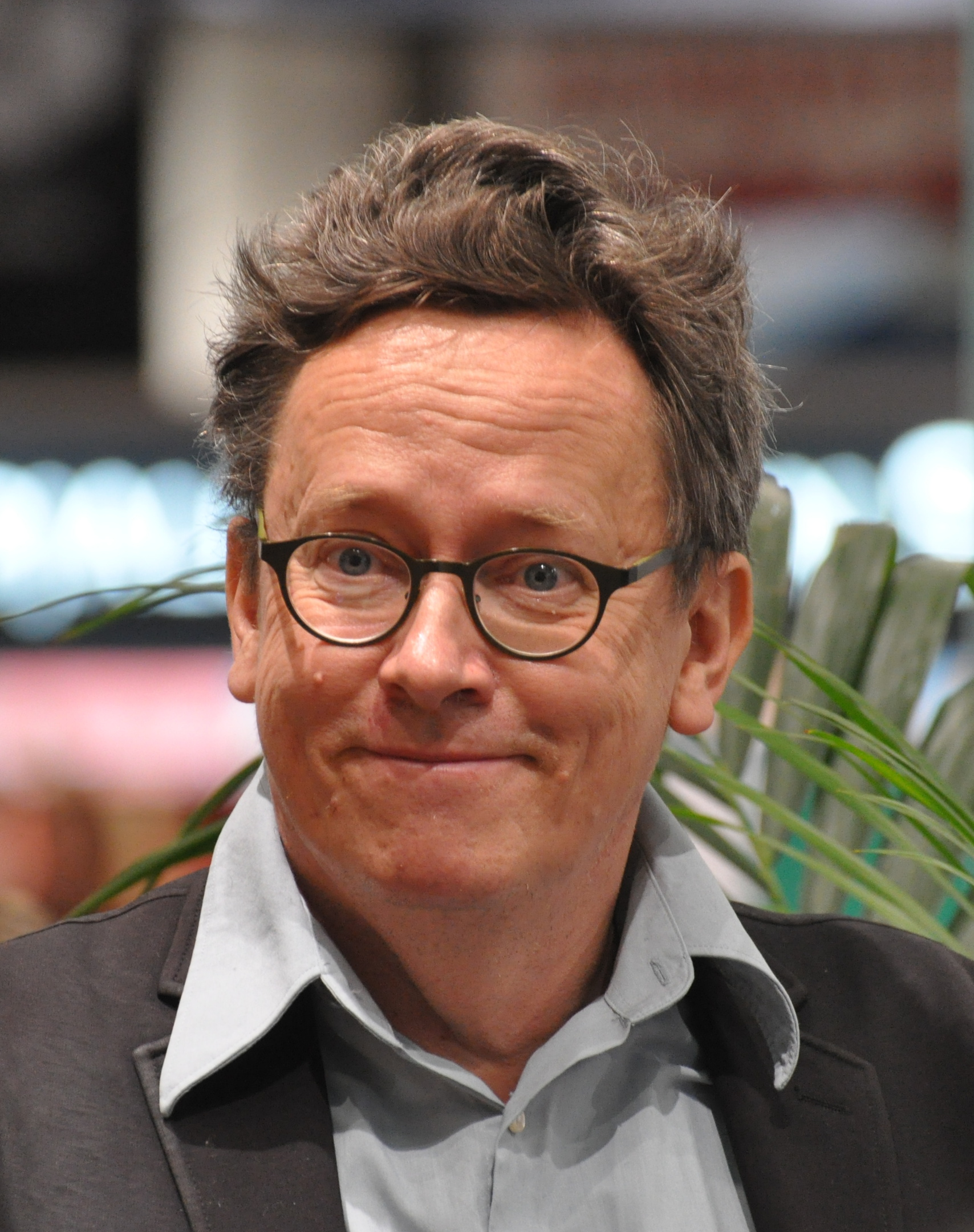
- Timo Honkela at Helsinki Book Fair, 2017.
- Born: August 4, 1962; Kalajoki
- Died: May 9, 2020 (aged 57)

Timo Untamo Honkela (August 4, 1962 – May 9, 2020) was a computer scientist at the University of Helsinki, Aalto University School of Science and Aalto University School of Art, Design and Architecture. He holds a PhD from Helsinki University of Technology.

From 2014 until 2018 he held a fixed-term professorship at the University of Helsinki. Before joining the University of Helsinki he worked as a non-tenured professor in two Schools of the Aalto University, The School of Art, Design and Architecture and the School of Science. He has presented his thoughts on his studies and work in the joint blog 375 Humanists.

Timo Honkela conducted research on several areas related to knowledge engineering, cognitive modeling and natural language processing.

Honkela was born in Kalajoki. From 1998 to 2000 he worked as a professor in the Aalto Media Lab. To the media Lab Honkela brought his expertise in Kohonen self-organising map (SOM) and worked closely with artist and designers around the topic.

In 2001 Honkela collaborated with George Legrady to produce an interactive museum installation, Pockets Full of Memories to the Centre Georges Pompidou, National Museum of Modern Art in Paris. The concept, created by Legrady, provided for visitors a possibility to scan their own objects to a database and then organise them by Kohonen Self-Organizing Map algorithm.

In 2017 Honkela published a book in Finnish. The book Rauhankone (English: Peace Machine) presents his idea of designing artificial intelligence and machine learning to serve humanity, in practice to help people to live in peace with each other. He died in Helsinki.

== Publications ==
- Timo Honkela, Wlodzislaw Duch, Mark Girolami and Samuel Kaski (editors): Artificial Neural Networks and Machine Learning, Springer, 2011.
- Jorma Laaksonen and Timo Honkela (editors): Advances in Self-Organizing Maps, Springer, 2011.
- Timo Honkela: Rauhankone. Gaudeamus, 2017.
