= 2024 in Finland =

- Decades: 2000s; 2010s; 2020s
- See also: Other events of 2024; Timeline of Finnish history

Events in the year 2024 in Finland.

== Incumbents ==
- President: Sauli Niinistö (until 1 March); Alexander Stubb onwards
- Prime Minister: Petteri Orpo
- Parliament: 2023–2027 Eduskunta/Riksdag
- Speaker of the Parliament: Jussi Halla-aho

== Events ==
=== January ===
- 28 January – 2024 Finnish presidential election (first round): Former prime minister Alexander Stubb and former foreign minister Pekka Haavisto advance to the runoff vote.

=== February ===
- 11 February – 2024 Finnish presidential election (second round): Alexander Stubb is elected President of Finland with 51.6% of the vote.

=== March ===
- 1 March – Alexander Stubb takes office as the 13th President of Finland.

=== April ===
- 2 April – Viertola school shooting; Three 12-year old children are shot, one of them fatally, in a school shooting in Vantaa. The suspect, who is also a 12-year old, is arrested.
- 13–14 April – Evacuations are ordered in parts of Northern Ostrobothnia due to flooding caused by the spring thaw.
- 26 April – Finns Party MP Timo Vornanen is arrested by police on suspicion of firing a gun inside a nightclub in Helsinki.

=== June ===
- 6–9 June – 2024 European Parliament election: The Left Alliance and the National Coalition Party emerge as the largest parties in the Finnish contingent to the European Parliament.

=== July ===
- 12 July – The Eduskunta votes 167-31 to approve a bill allowing the Finnish Border Guard to turn away third-country migrants trying to enter from Russia and reject their asylum applications on national security grounds. The bill is signed into law by President Alexander Stubb on 16 July.
- 26 July – Finland reports that a Russian Navy vessel from its Baltic Sea fleet trespassed on its territorial waters in the eastern Gulf of Finland.

=== October ===
- 16 October – A World War II-era North American T-6 Texan trainer aircraft crashes into a forest near Räyskälä Airfield, killing its two German pilots.

=== November ===
- 3 November – The Tampere Lenin Museum, the last remaining museum outside Russia dedicated to the life of Vladimir Lenin, closes down.
- 18 November – A section of the C-Lion1 submarine communications cable running under the Baltic Sea between Finland and Germany is cut off the Swedish coast in what German authorities suspect as an act of sabotage.
- 29 November – Biafran separatists declare the restoration of Biafra's independence in Lahti with plans to establish the United States of Biafra.

=== December ===
- 2 December – Two sections of a submarine communications cable running under the Baltic Sea between Finland and Sweden are cut in what Swedish authorities suspect as an act of sabotage, affecting about 6,000 households in Finland.
- 19 December – A bus and a minivan carrying tourists collides near Rovaniemi, killing two people.
- 25 December – The submarine Estlink-2 power cable running under the Gulf of Finland between Finland and Estonia is cut, leading to suspicions that a vessel linked to Russia is responsible.

== Deaths ==
- Vieno Länsman, politician
- Heljä Liukko-Sundström, ceramic artist
- Marjorie (singer), singer

== Holidays ==
- 1 January - New Year's Day
- 6 January - Epiphany
- 29 March - Good Friday
- 1 April - Easter Monday
- 1 May - May Day
- 9 May - Ascension Day
- 19 May - Whit Sunday
- 21 June – Midsummer Day
- 2 November - All Saints' Day
- 6 December – Independence Day
- 24 December - Christmas Eve
- 25 December - Christmas Day
- 26 December – Boxing Day

== Art and entertainment ==
- List of Finnish submissions for the Academy Award for Best International Feature Film
- List of Finnish films of the 2020s

== See also ==
- 2024 in the European Union
- 2024 in Europe
