= Kai Kalima =

Finnish lawyer and politician (1945–2023)

Member of the Parliament of Finland
- In office 15 December 1989 – 21 March 1991
- Preceded by: Reino Paasilinna

Personal details
- Born: Kai-Erik Klaus Kalima; 6 October 1945 Helsinki, Finland
- Died: 13 January 2023 (aged 77) Helsinki, Finland
- Party: SDP
- Education: University of Helsinki
- Occupation: Professor of law

Kai-Erik Klaus Kalima (6 October 1945 – 13 January 2023) was a Finnish law professor and politician. A member of the Social Democratic Party, he served in the Parliament of Finland from 1989 to 1991.

Kalima served as a professor of municipal law at Tampere University and financial law at Helsinki University.

Kalima died on 13 January 2023, at the age of 77.
