= Klaus Sahlgren =

Finnish diplomat (1928–2019)

Klaus Aksel Sahlgren (11 August 1928 – 5 July 2019) was a Finnish diplomat, and a Bachelor of Political Sciences. He served as Deputy Director General for Trade Policy at the Ministry for Foreign Affairs 1969–1970, Permanent Representative of Finland to Geneva, United Nations International Organizations 1970–1975, Deputy Secretary-General of the United Nations 1975–1983, and Secretary-General of the United Nations Economic Commission for Europe 1983–1986.

After retiring, Sahlgren settled in Korpo and was involved in local politics.
