= Eero Mäkelä =

Finnish chef

Eero Mäkelä (December 11, 1942 – June 10, 2008) was a Finnish chef. His Palace Gourmet restaurant was the first in Finland to win a Michelin star and became a Cordon Bleu in 1974.

== Biography ==
Eero Mäkelä was born in Turku.

He first organized competitions in Finland between Scandinavian restaurant cooks. Competitions were held in Helsinki in 1982. He acted as judge in many international competitions, including four times at the Bocuse d'Or competition in Lyon. He was also an expert in the education and training of cooking and restaurant management.

Eero Mäkelä also acted as the Finnish Chef Association's chairman, and later the association's honorary chair. Mäkelä was active and well-known chef in Finland, who made a whole career in Finnish food culture.

He died, aged 65, in Helsinki.
