= Christer Boucht =

Swedo-Finnish lawyer, explorer and writer

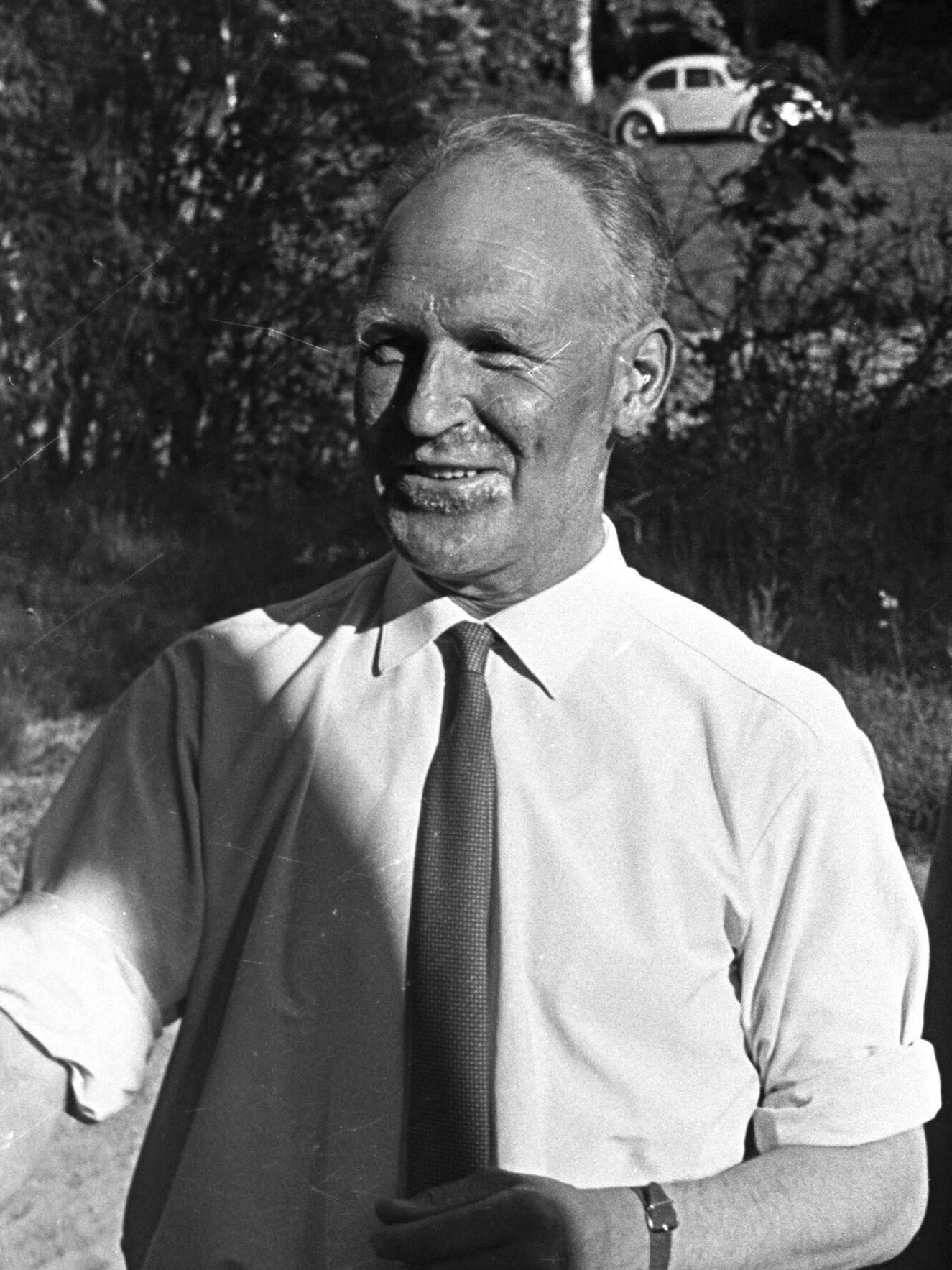
- Boucht in 1966
- Born: 4 March 1911; Vaasa, Finland
- Died: 21 May 2009 (aged 98); Vaasa, Finland
- Occupations: Lawyer, explorer, writer, politician

Christer Boucht (4 March 1911 – 21 May 2009) was a Finland-Swedish lawyer, adventure traveler and writer.

== Biography ==
Boucht was born in Vaasa, Finland, and his parents were Harald Boucht, who held the title of hovrättsråd, and Beda Finnilä. He married Inga Ulrika Stenberg in 1941. Boucht graduated from Vasa svenska samskola in 1930, received a law degree from the University of Helsinki in 1937, became a varatuomari in 1940, and obtained a licentiate in law in 1945.

Boucht served as a young reserve officer in both the Winter War and the Continuation War. In 1966 he was the first man from Finland to cross the Greenland ice on skis and by dog team. He has written several books on his polar expeditions in northern Canada and the journey across Greenland. In some of his books, he has also described the experiences from Finland's wars during the Second World War.

Boucht founded his own law firm in 1941. He ended his professional career in 2000, when at the age of 89 he was the country's oldest active lawyer. Boucht also worked as a politician. He was a member of the Vaasa City Council from 1947 to 1990 and of the City Board from 1958 to 1962. He was a member of Folktinget from 1951 to 1988.

Boucht was for many years an active member in the Finnish Arctic Society and in 2002 he became honorary member of the Society. His archive is held by the Society of Swedish Literature in Finland.

Boucht died in Vaasa at the age of 98 in 2009.

== Bibliography ==
- 1968 – Grönland tvärs (Finnish translation: Hiihtäen halki Grönlannin, 1978)
- 1970 – Turkiska marschen
- 1973 – Letar efter lycka
- 1975 – Från Hovrättsbacken till Klippiga bergen. ISBN 951-9157-17-4
- 1976 – På knaggliga stigar (Finnish translation: Jääteitä ja vuoripolkuja, 1976). ISBN 951-9000-28-3
- 1977 – Ett arktiskt äventyr. (Finnish translation: Jäinen retki, 1977) ISBN 951-9000-38-0
- 1978 – Skidtur över Grönland
- 1979 – Klondike hägrar (Finnish translation: Kohti Klondiken kultaa, 1979). ISBN 951-9000-75-5
- 1981 – Guldgrävarna i Klondike. ISBN 951-9000-89-5
- 1982 – Färder och irrfärder. ISBN 951-9000-99-2
- 1985 – Nordlandets män. ISBN 951-9001-12-3
- 1987 – Island. ISBN 951-9001-19-0
- 1988 – Frostbitet. ISBN 951-8902-15-1
- 1992 – Antarktis: Ögonblicksbilder från kontinenten kring Sydpolen. ISBN 951-50-0549-3
- 1993 – Jag reste till Antarktis
- 1995 – Från Paradiset till främsta linjen: Minnen från seklets första hälft. ISBN 951-50-0727-5
- 1996 – Öppna vidder: Arktiska äventyr under 30 år. ISBN 951-50-0823-9
- 1997 – Vind och snöstorm
- 2001 – Vapengömmare: Inför ockupationshotet 1944. ISBN 951-8902-89-5
- 2004 – Med utsikt från Paradiset. ISBN 952-5496-16-3
