= Kari Karanko =

Finnish diplomat (1941–2020)

Kari Juhani Karanko (12 March 1941 in Suomussalmi – 9 May 2020 in Helsinki) was a Finnish diplomat. He was Master of Science (Economics) by education. He was Finnish Ambassador to Dar es Salaam from 1988 to 1993 and then the Development Counselor of the Ministry for Foreign Affairs. He was Finnish ambassador to Windhoek (Namibia) from 1998 to 2000. From there, Karanko had to return to Finland because he had criticized the Namibian government because it had taken part in the Second Congo War. After that, he was the head of the Department for International Environmental Policy at the Ministry for Foreign Affairs. From 2006 to 2007, Karanko was Finnish Ambassador to Kathmandu.
