= Rauni-Leena Luukanen-Kilde =

Finnish ufologist (1939–2015)

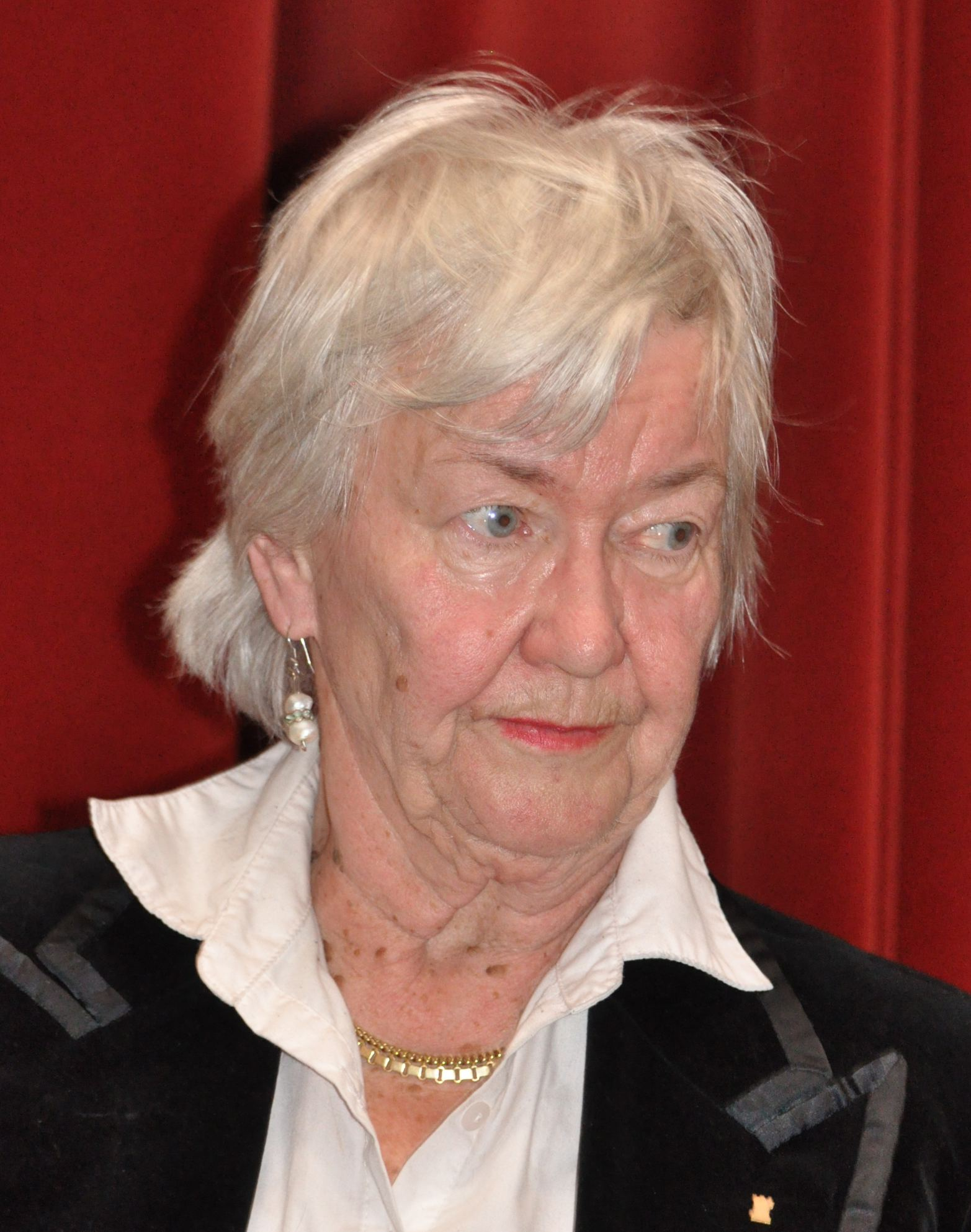
- Rauni-Leena Luukanen-Kilde in 2012.
- Born: 15 November 1939; Värtsilä, Finland
- Died: 8 February 2015 (aged 75); Vaasa, Finland
- Occupations: Physician, author
- Spouse(s): Mauri Luukanen (1965–?); Sverre Kilde (1987–1996)

Rauni-Leena Tellervo Luukanen-Kilde (née Valve; 15 November 1939 – 8 February 2015) was a Finnish physician who wrote and lectured on parapsychology, ufology, and mind control.

== Biography ==
Luukanen-Kilde was born in Värtsilä. She had to flee with her family in infancy during the Second World War and was raised in Helsinki. She studied medicine at the universities of Oulu and Turku, graduating in 1967. She was at one point the only medical practitioner at the hospital in Pelkosenniemi, performing dental and veterinary work as well. In March 1975, she became a provincial medical officer in Rovaniemi, Lapland; she became chief medical officer for Lapland.

In 1982, as Rauni-Leena Luukanen, she published Kuolemaa ei ole (There Is No Death). She had been interested in the paranormal since she was a teenager, but the 1985 car accident which led to her retirement was reportedly "significant in her turn to ufology". She appeared as a featured speaker at UFO conferences, helped organize the first international conference on extraterrestrials in Finland and authored books about UFOs, alien abductions, mind control and conspiracy theories. Luukanen-Kilde claimed to have been "rescued" from danger by extraterrestrials, and to have esoteric skills and knowledge as a result of her relationship with them. She said that there was a secret exchange program between humans and aliens that was being deliberately suppressed by "powerful Western governments", particularly the United States. Luukanen-Kilde also said that secret military and intelligence agencies were practising mind control technology on the world population using cell phones and supercomputers and that a plot to kill most of the Earth's population using the swine flu vaccine was being carried out by the WHO, Henry Kissinger and the Bilderberg Group. Her article on cybernetic implants as a means of control is widely circulated. She appears in the 1999 film Revelations: The End Times, Volume 2.

Luukanen-Kilde married a Norwegian diplomat in 1987 and moved to Norway in 1992. After her husband's death in 1996, Luukanen-Kilde died in February 2015 in Vaasa after a long illness, having returned to Finland shortly before.

== Selected publications ==
- Kuolemaa ei ole. Espoo: Weilin & Göös, 1982. ISBN 951-35-2776-X. Helsinki: Uusi kirjakerho, 1982. ISBN 951-54-0364-2 (Both as Rauni-Leena Luukanen.) Revised edition: Helsinki: WSOY, 1992. ISBN 951-0-17866-7
- Tähtien lähettiläs. Helsinki: WSOY, 1991. ISBN 951-0-17031-3
- Kuka hän on? Helsinki: WSOY, 1993. ISBN 951-0-18918-9
- Universumin lapsi. Helsinki: WSOY, 1995. ISBN 951-0-19914-1
- Salatut maailmamme. Son: Star Sisters International, 2007. ISBN 978-952-92-1785-4
- Bright Light on Black Shadows. Georgetown, Ontario, Canada, 2015 ISBN 978-0-9940374-0-4
- JASNE ŚWIATŁO W CIEMNOŚCI TUNELU, Georgetown, Ontario, Canada, 2016 ISBN 978-0-9940374-1-1
- JAKIM CVJETLOM PREKO CRNIH SJENA Vesna Smokovic 52100 Pula ISBN 978 - 953-48151-1-3
