= Jyrki Yrttiaho =

Finnish politician (1952–2021)

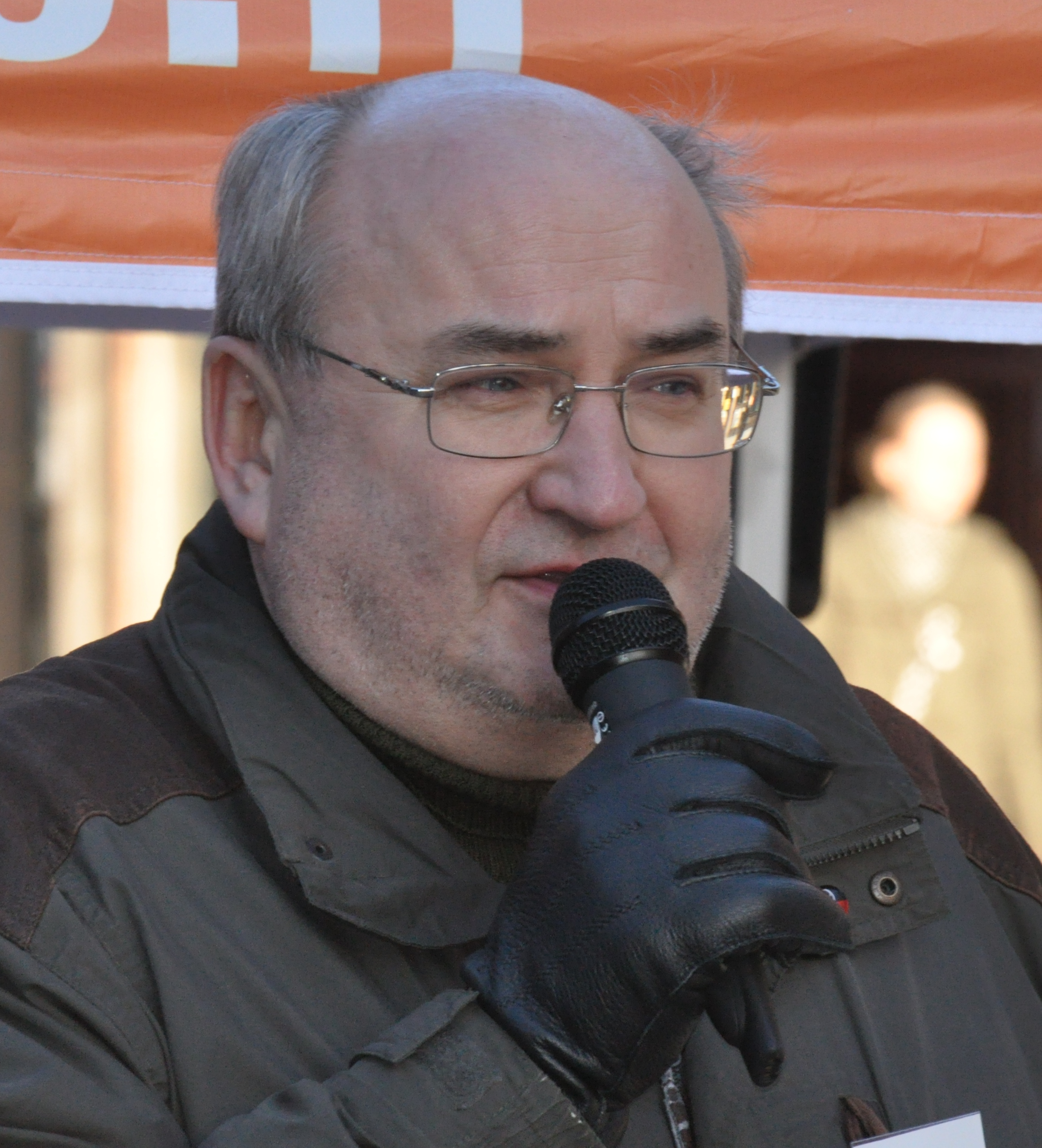
Jyrki Yrttiaho in 2011.

Jyrki Valto Yrttiaho (4 May 1952 – 17 February 2021) was a Finnish politician and member of the Finnish Parliament, representing the Left Alliance. He was born in Pelkosenniemi. He was elected to the Finnish Parliament in the 2007 election.
