= TangaReef =

- Company type: Private
- Industry: Travel, Internet
- Founded: 2011
- Area served: Worldwide
- Website: tangareef.com

TangaReef is a company providing online booking for scuba diving, snorkeling and freediving around the world. The service allows tourists to find dive centers based on location, activities and instruction language. Divers can conveniently make bookings online as well as review and rate dive centers. TangaReef has been compared to Hotels.com, with a focus on dive centers. The website is currently in English. It provides online bookings for more than 60 dive centers (February 2013) in popular tourist destinations such as Thailand, the Philippines, Egypt, and the Caribbean with Mexico, Curaçao, Colombia, the Virgin Islands and Jamaica.

Customers can book scuba diving courses, fun diving, day trips, freediving and snorkeling excursions. The selection of courses ranges from beginner level and try-outs to advanced level Rescue Diver courses. Certified divers can book fun diving packages for one or multiple days. TangaReef works with dive centers accredited by PADI, SSI, CMAS and NAUI.

Dive centers are sorted and filtered based on criteria such as customer reviews, quality, safety and care for the oceans.

== Company history ==
TangaReef was founded by Oliver Bremer and Robert Aarts in 2011 in Helsinki, Finland. Traditionally, the booking process in the diving industry is very manual and time-consuming. Automated online booking is a rarity. TangaReef makes the booking of diving activities as convenient and safe as booking a hotel room or a flight ticket while at the same time supporting ocean conservation. TangaReef launched its services on the World Oceans Day 2012. TangaReef was a finalist at the world-famous tech, design & startup conference Slush in 2011, and is the winner of the Pitch 18 competition in 2012. The company is an associate member of SMAL (Suomen Matkatoimistoalan Liitto), the Association of Finnish Travel Agents (AFTA).)

== Ocean conservation ==
TangaReef encourages responsible diving and dive center operations. Each review and booking made on TangaReef, contributes to the benefit of the oceans. Inspired by Sylvia Earle’s book “The World is Blue: How Our Fate and the Ocean’s Are One”, TangaReef actively supports organizations such as Nature Conservancy or Coral Reef Alliance. TangaReef is advised by National Geographic Explorer-in-Residence Dr. Enric Sala.
