= George Arthur Kulmala =

Canadian artist

- Born: 1896; Pori, Finland
- Died: 1940 (aged 43–44)

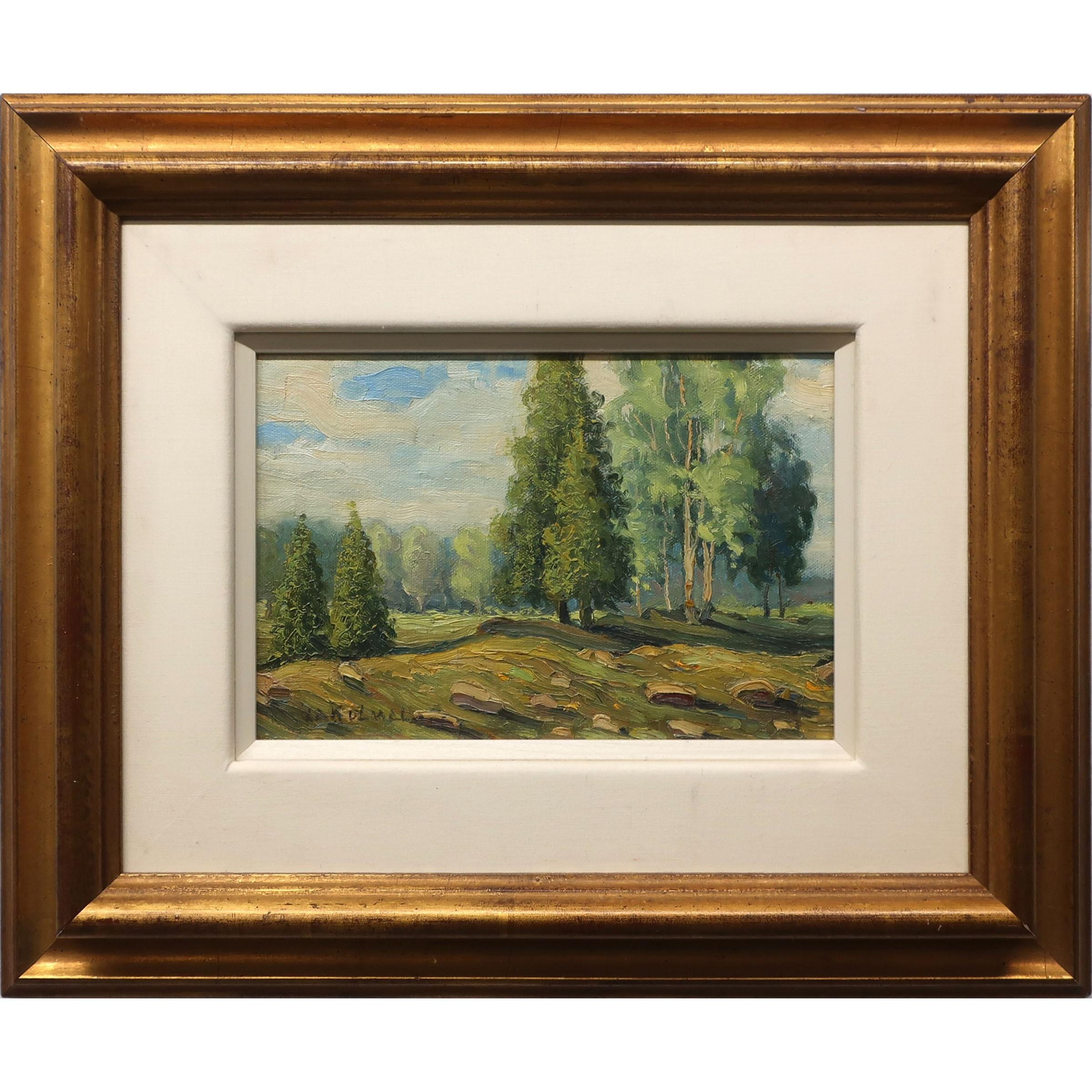

George Arthur Kulmala (1896 – 1940) was a Canadian artist, who specialized in Ontario northern landscapes particularly in Muskoka and Algonquin Park. He was known in the artists community as he was a member of the Ontario Society of Artists and President of the Toronto Finnish Artists' Group.

George Kulmala was taught by J.W. Beatty at the Ontario College of Art. George Kulmala's oil paintings are held in several art galleries including the Art Gallery of Ontario and private collections.

He was born in Pori, Grand Duchy of Finland in 1896 and immigrated to Toronto in 1904. While developing a reputation as a talented artist, he also worked as a furrier in Toronto. He died at the age of 44. He had a wife, a daughter and later, two granddaughters.
