= 2014 in Finland =

- Decades: 1990s; 2000s; 2010s; 2020s
- See also: Other events of 2014; Timeline of Finnish history

The following lists events that happened during 2014 in Finland.

== Incumbents ==
- President: Sauli Niinistö
- Prime Minister: Jyrki Katainen (until 24 June), Alexander Stubb (starting 24 June)
- Speaker: Eero Heinäluoma

== Events ==
=== June ===
- June 9 – Russian President Vladimir Putin's personal envoy warns Finland against joining NATO.
- June 13 – The city council of Pello offers 50 euro to each Finnish speaking taxpayer who changes language to Swedish in order to secure the bilingual Finnish-Swedish regime.
- June 24 – A new coalition government takes office in Finland, the first led by a Swedish-speaking Finn since 1959.

=== July ===
- July 24 – In Herat, Afghanistan, two Finnish women working for a foreign aid organization are shot and killed.
- July 25 – Vietnamese authorities confirm that a shipment of Vietnamese-owned air-to-air missile parts bound for Ukraine was detained by Finland on June 24 after raising concerns the consignment of military hardware violated arms-export regulations.

=== November ===
- November 28 – The Parliament of Finland votes to allow same-sex marriage, marking the first time that a citizens' initiative has received lawmakers' blessing to be written into the legislation.
