= Jon Hellevig =

Finnish lawyer and businessman (1962–2020)

- Born: 26 February 1962; Helsinki
- Died: 26 May 2020 (aged 58); Moscow, Russia
- Occupation: lawyer
- Notable work: see → bibliography

Jon Krister Hellevig (26 February 1962 – 26 May 2020) was a Finnish lawyer and businessman who worked in Russia since the early 1990s. He was the managing partner of the Moscow-based law company Hellevig, Klein & Usov Llc. Hellevig wrote books about Russian legislation and society and wrote columns for Russian media.

Hellevig was a candidate in the European parliament election in 2014. During the campaign he caused a stir when he berated the opera singer Karita Mattila in a vulgar way, after she had refused to perform under the leadership of a Russian conductor who supported Russian President Vladimir Putin's policy in Ukraine.

Newsweek magazine used Hellevig as a source to comment on letters sent to Finnish army reservists. In the original version of the article, the letters were regarded as preparation for a crisis situation. The article was edited and Hellevig's comments removed after a response by the Finnish Defence Forces.

Hellevig openly supported Vladimir Putin's government and the separatist movement in Ukraine.

He died unexpectedly in Moscow on May 26, 2020 from COVID-19.

== Work career ==
=== Interbank ===
In the late 1980s Hellevig was co-founder of Interbank, which focused on handling transactions between different banks in Finland. The market dropped soon after the beginning of the Finnish banking crisis and the bank was eventually sold.

=== Sofinamtrans ===
During the banking crisis, when Hellevig had to consider a new direction for his career, he travelled with his wife to the Soviet Union to visit her relatives. Soon after his return, the 1991 Soviet coup d'état attempt took place. After seeing on television Yeltsin giving his famous speech from atop a tank, Hellevig went to a book store and bought a Russian language book for beginners. Hellevig started to study the language and was posted to Moscow by Finnish construction company Haka for consulting in its partly owned joint venture Sofinamtrans. Hellevig was the only foreigner in the organisation and got a thorough introduction to Soviet-style bureaucracy. The assignment included negotiations with EBRD and it eventually took five years.

=== Armstrong World Industries ===
Hellevig's next job was for Armstrong World Industries, which produced interior ceilings. The company had ambitious investment plans and Hellevig led a large financial department. However, the 1998 Russian financial crisis put a stop to investments, and the department capacity was underused. Armstrong was pressured to keep down costs, but it still wanted to stay in the Russian market. Hellevig persuaded the company to outsource the department under a new company called Avenir, after which it served other companies operating in Russia. Hellevig became the manager of Avenir.

=== Awara ===
Avenir Group was later renamed Awara. It offers consulting services for companies operating in Russia. Hellevig led the company which has locations in Russia in Saint Petersburg, Moscow, Tver and Yekaterinburg, as well as Kyiv in Ukraine and Helsinki in Finland. Hellevig was the managing partner in the law firm Hellevig, Usov & Klein, which works under Awara.

== Political activity and media ==
Hellevig was a candidate for the European parliament in the 2014 elections on the list of the Finnish Independence Party. He advocated for Finland's separation from the European Union and the maintenance of a good relationship with Russia. While the campaign was still ongoing, Hellevig criticised soprano Karita Mattila for her decision not to perform in New York City under the leadership of Russian conductor Valery Gergiev, who supported Vladimir Putin's actions in the Russo-Ukrainian war.

On Facebook, Hellevig called Mattila a Nazi whore, compared her to Eva Braun, and threatened to ruin her concert by "gang raping" the concert. The Independence Party leadership dissociated themselves from Hellevig's comments and asserted that the party no longer supported Hellevig's election campaign. As it was not possible to withdraw from the election, Hellevig remained a candidate. He received 287 votes.

Hellevig wrote articles for the Russian media. In his writings, he supported Putin and claimed that Western media are biased or lying about the political situation in Russia. Hellevig thought that Western countries will eventually recognize Russian rule in the Crimean peninsula.

In May 2015, Newsweek magazine reported that the Finnish Defence Forces (FDF) was preparing itself for a crisis situation by sending informational letters to army reservists. According to the Defence Forces, there was no link between the reservist letters and the Russo-Ukrainian war. The FDF noted a number of factual errors found in the article. One of the sources had been Hellevig, and his comments were removed from the updated version of the article.

== Bibliography ==
- Hellevig, Jon; Tiusanen, Tauno; Usov, Artem (2006) [2002]. Avenir Guide to Russian Taxation. Helsinki: Russia Advisory Group. ISBN 978-9-529-97850-2.
- Hellevig, Jon; Tiusanen, Tauno; Usov, Artem (2005). The Russian Tax Reform Paving Way for Investments. Lappeenranta: Lappeenranta University of Technology. ISBN 952-214-127-5.
- Hellevig, Jon; Usov, Artem (2006). Avenir Guide to Russian Labor Law and HR Administration. Helsinki: Russia Advisory Group. ISBN 978-952-99785-6-4.
- Hellevig, Jon (2007). All is Art!. Helsinki: Russia Advisory Group. ISBN 978-952-99785-4-0.
- Hellevig, Jon (2007). Expressions and Interpretations. Helsinki: Russia Advisory Group. ISBN 978-952-99785-5-7.
- Hellevig, Jon (2010). The Case Against Noam Chomsky – Mental Processing. Helsinki: Russia Advisory Group. ISBN 978-952-99785-8-8.
- Hellevig, Jon (2012). Putin's New Russia. Kontinent. ISBN 978-0-9883137-0-5.

== Sources ==
=== Literature ===
- Mäkinen, Tapani (2005). Suuri maa, pitkä kvartaali [Large country, long quarter] (PDF). Sitran raportteja (in Finnish). Vol. 48. Helsinki: Edita Prima Oy. ISBN 951-37-4417-5. ISSN 1457-571X.
