= Torsti Lehtinen =

Finnish writer and philosopher (1942–2023)

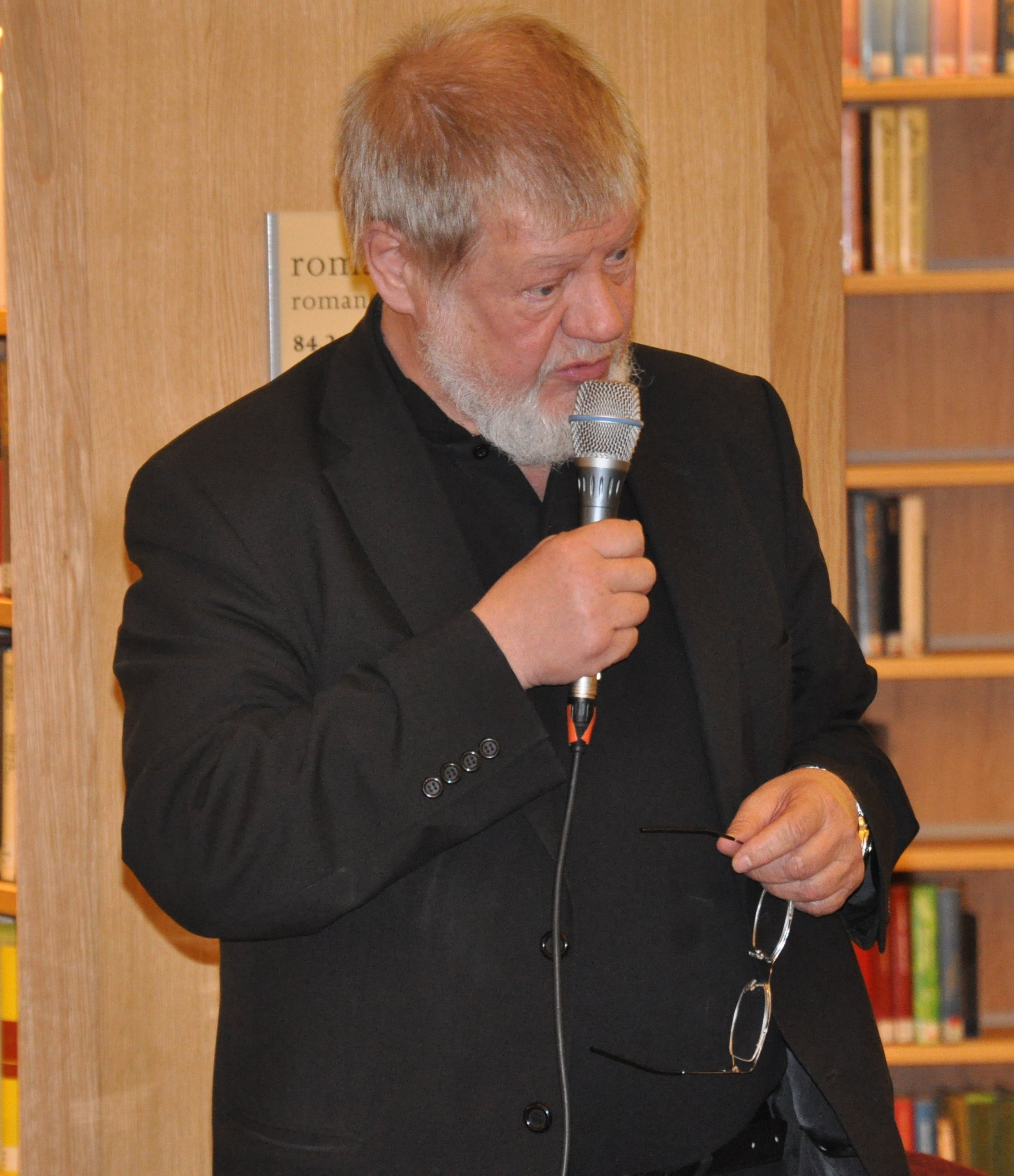
Lehtinen in 2009

Torsti Lehtinen (25 July 1942 – 16 September 2023) was a Finnish writer and philosopher.

== Life and career ==
Torsti Lehtinen was born in Helsinki on 25 July 1942. He studied philosophy, theology and literature at the University of Helsinki.

In 1959 he made his first trip abroad, to Copenhagen, a city that became and has remained a foreign focal point for him. In the years 1979–1982 he lived in Stockholm before returning to Finland, first to Central Finland and then, in 1999, to his native Helsinki.

From his youth he tried his hand at some 40 different professions, the more serious of which were working as a teacher for the socially handicapped for five years and as a software consultant for Nokia computers for nine years.

In 1982 he published his first novel, Kun päättyy Pitkäsilta / Where ends the Longbridge (second edition 1992, third 1997). With the publication of his second novel, Kuin unta ja varjoa / Like dream and shadow, in 1983, he became a full-time writer. Since then he has written more than 20 works, including novels, aphorisms, poems, essays, plays and non-fiction. He has also edited several books and been a co-writer of around 50 books. Parts of his production have been translated into Danish, Swedish, German, Estonian and Russian. Torsti Lehtinen has also been active as a translator. His translations include the main works of Søren Kierkegaard, as well as works from Swedish and English.

Lehtinen taught philosophy and creative writing at many Finnish universities and academic institutions, and has held seminars and given lectures at, amongst others, the universities of Helsinki, Tartu and Reykjavik, and the Nordens folkliga akademi in Gothenburg.

Lehtinen was awarded several literature prizes, e.g. The WSOY Literature Award, and he won The National Biennial Championships in Essayism in 1995.

Lehtinen served on the board of the Central Finland Writers’ Association, and, after moving back to Helsinki, was invited to become president of the Helsinki Writers’ Guild in 2003. He also served as vice-president of the Finnish Writers' Association (2000–2005) and was created an honorary member of The Central-Finland Writers’ Association in 1995.

His later work included Kainin Merkki or The Mark of Cain, published by Arktinen Banaani in September 2013.

Torsti Lehtinen died in Helsinki on 16 September 2023, at the age of 81.
