= Richard Tötterman =

Finnish diplomat (1926–2020)

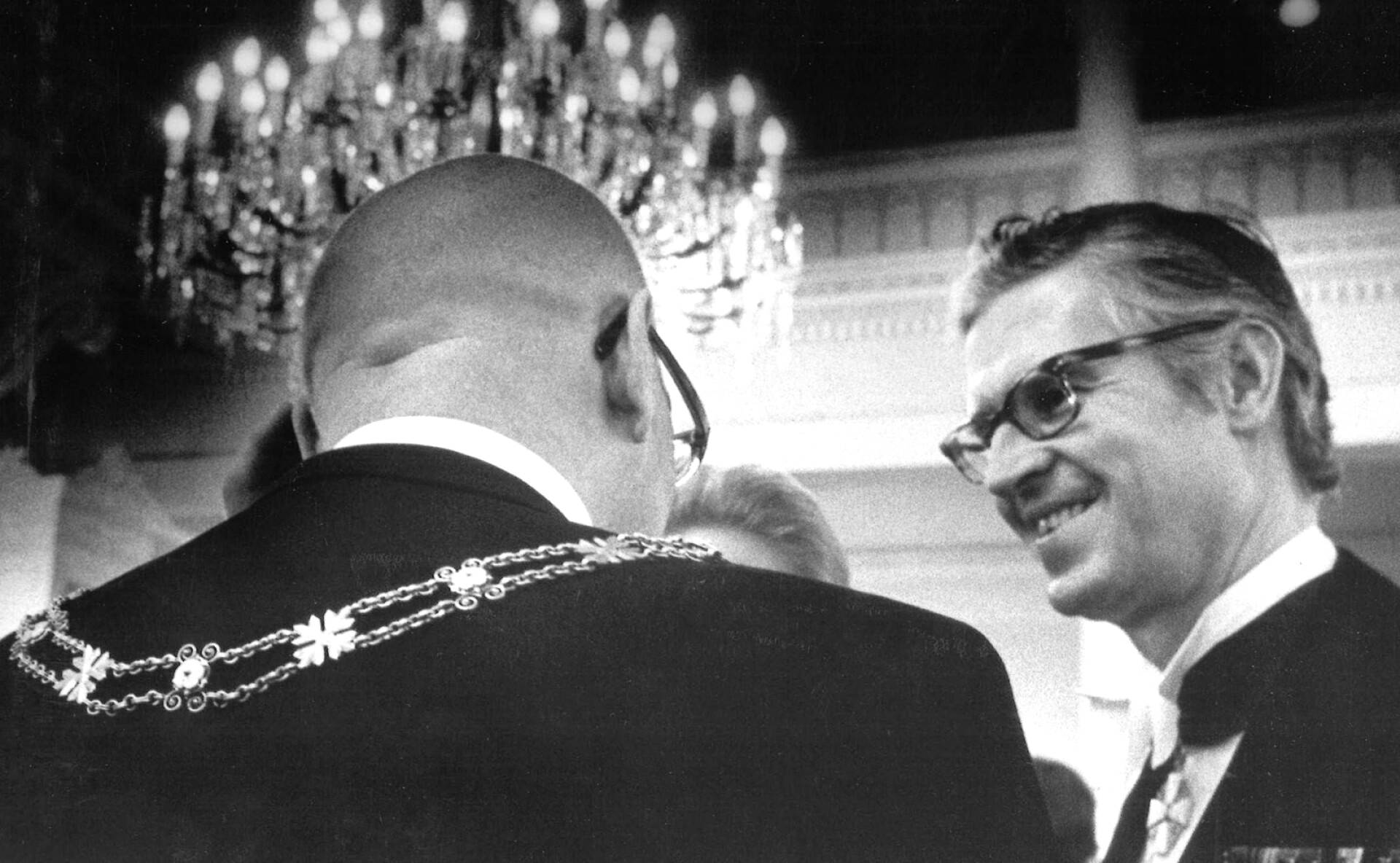
- Richard Tötterman (right) in 1971
- Born: 10 October 1926; Helsinki
- Died: Helsinki
- Education: Doctor of Philosophy
- Alma mater: University of Oxford
- Occupation: Diplomat
- Awards: Memorial medal of the Continuation War; Knight First Class of the Order of the Lion of Finland (1963); Commander of the Order of the White Rose of Finland (1968); Commander First Class of the Order of the White Rose of Finland (1974); Knight First Class of the Order of St. Olav (1954); Knight of the Order of Vasa (1956); Honorary Officer of the Order of the British Empire (1961); Commander of the National Order of Merit (1966); Knight Grand Officer of the Order of Saint Olav (1967); Knight Grand Officer of the Order of the Polar Star (1967); Grand Officer of the Order of the Crown (1969); Knight Commander of the Royal Victorian Order (1969); Order of the Lion and the Sun First class (1970); Grand Cross of the Order of Saint Agatha (1971); Star of the Socialist Republic of Romania, 2nd class (1971); Order of the Flag of the People's Republic of Hungary (1971); Grand Cross of the Order of Honour for Services to the Republic of Austria (1972); Knight Grand Cross of the Order of the Falcon (1972); Grand Officer of the National Order of the Lion (1973); Grand Cross of the Order of the Dannebrog (1973); Grand Cross of the Order of Orange-Nassau (1974); Order of the Polar Star - Commander's Grand Cross (1974); (1974); Star of People's Friendship in Silver (1974); Royal Victorian Chain (1976); Queen Elizabeth II Coronation Medal
- Position held: ambassador (1975–1990)

Richard Evert Björnson Tötterman (10 October 1926, Helsinki – 11 December 2020) was a Finnish lawyer and diplomat.

== Education ==
Tötterman studied law at the University of Helsinki, gaining a Licentiate of Law degree in 1949.

He continued his studies at Oxford, earning a DPhil in 1951 with his thesis titled "The scope of the rule locus regit actum in the conflict of laws".

== Career ==
Tötterman served as the Permanent Secretary of the President of Finland from 1966 to 1970, and of the Ministry for Foreign Affairs from 1970 to 1975.

This was followed by Ambassadorships to London (1975–1983) and Bern (1983–1990).

He also played a key role in organising the CSCE summit, leading to the Helsinki Accords in 1975.

== Awards and honours ==
In 1982, Tötterman was made Honorary Fellow of his alma mater, Brasenose College.

He was made Commander, First Class, of the Order of the White Rose of Finland (1974).

Tötterman was also awarded honorary OBE in 1961, as well as Knight (1969) and Knight Grand Cross (1976) of the Royal Victorian Order, among many other Finnish and international decorations.
