= Jorma Katrama =

Finnish instrumentalist (1936–2022)

Jorma Kalevi Katrama (5 June 1936 – 2 January 2022) was a Finnish instrumentalist who specialized in violin and double bass. Katrama died on 2 January 2022, at the age of 85.

== Solo albums ==
- Contrabasso con amore FINLANDIA RECORDS (Warner) 4509-95605-2
- Contrabasso con bravura 4509-97894-2
- Contrabasso con sentimento 4509-97894-2
- Contrabasso concertante 3984-21450-2
- Contrabass! Warner Korea 3984-21355-2
- Le charme de la contrebasse ERATO 39842-27082
