= Erkki Ertama =

Erkki Ertama born Bertel Erik Ertama orig. Enbom (26 November 1927 – 16 September 2010)) was a Finnish composer and conductor. He was born in Alavus, Finland, and died in Helsinki.
