= Risto Alapuro =

Finnish sociologist (1944–2022)

Risto Sakari Alapuro (28 April 1944 – 6 December 2022) was a Finnish sociologist.

== Biography ==
Alapuro was born in Ruokolahti on 28 April 1944.

He was a professor of sociology at University of Jyväskylä between 1986 and 1991, and a professor at Helsinki University from 1991 to 2010.

Alapuro was an internationally known social scientist who focused on historical sociology in Finland. He researched, studied and taught in France, Russia and the United States. He specialized in social movements, political conflicts and social networks.

He wrote his doctoral dissertation Akateeminen Karjala-Seura (in 1973). His other works include State and revolution in Finland (1988), which concerns the Finnish civil war, and Suomen synty paikallisena ilmiönä 1890-1933 (1994), which is about the birth of Finnish nationhood as a local phenomenon.

Alapuro died in Helsinki on 6 December 2022, at the age of 78.
