= Päiviö Tommila =

Finnish historian (1931–2022)

Juhani Päiviö Tommila (4 August 1931 – 18 November 2022) was a Finnish historian and professor at Helsinki University.

== Career ==
Tommila was born in Jyväskylä on 4 August 1931. He became a PhD in 1962 with his dissertation La Finlande dans la politique européenne en 1809–1815. He was assistant at the university of Helsinki 1959-65 and associate professor 1962–67. Tommila was professor in Finland's history at the University of Turku 1965-76 and professor in Finland's history at Helsinki University 1976–94. He served as rector of the University of Helsinki from 1988 to 1992.

Tommila focused on Finnish history, foremost its political history in the 19th century, urban and journalistic history, and also historiography. He was an academician, and a member of the Academy of Finland from 2004.

Tommila's father was Eero Tommila, professor for chemistry at Helsinki University. Päiviö Tommila died on 18 November 2022, at the age of 91, in Kauniainen.

== Publications ==
=== Author ===
- Nurmijärven pitäjän historia I–II (1958–59)
- La Finlande dans la politique européenne en 1809–1815 (1962)
- Suomen lehdistön levikki ennen vuotta 1860 (1963)
- Jyväskylän kaupungin historia I–II (1970–72)
- Keski-Suomen lehdistö I–IV (with T. Raitio, 1970–79)
- Suomen autonomian synty 1809–1819 (1984)
- Suomen historiankirjoitus (1989)
- Research in Finland: A History (2006)
- Eero Tommila, kemisti (2009)
- Kummalasta Telkkään: Sata vuotta Kustavin kesähistoriaa (2010)
- Talonpoikia ja opinkäyntiä: Merikarvian Köörtilän Tommilan talon ja suvun tarina (2011)

=== Editor ===
- Suomen kulttuurihistoria, I–III (1979–82)
- Suomen kaupunkilaitoksen historia, I–III (1981–84)
- Suomen lehdistön historia, I–X (1985–92)
- Suomen hallitsijat (2000)
- Suomen tieteen historia, I–IV (2000–03)
