= Esko Tommola =

Finnish newsreader

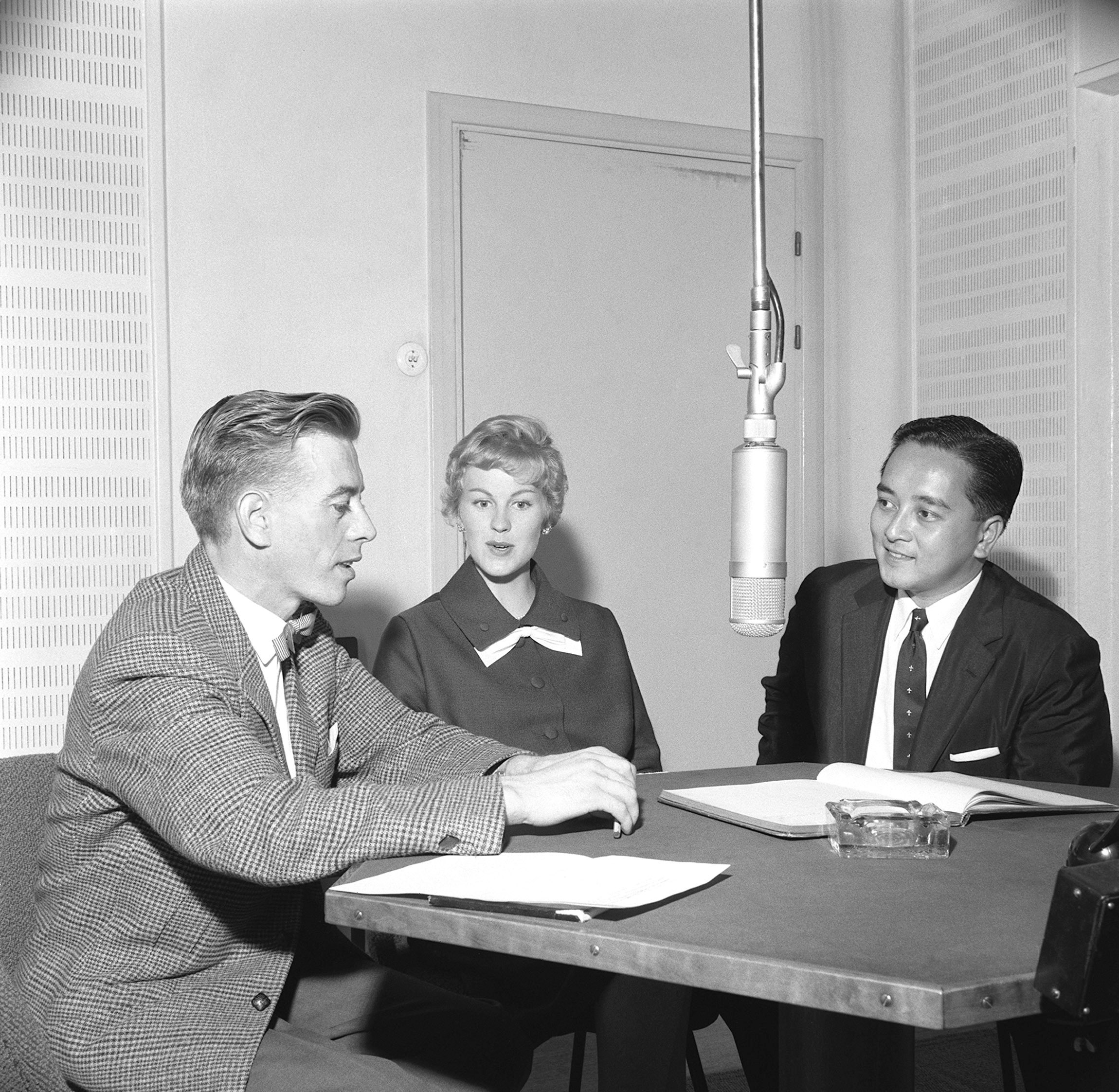
Esko Tommola (left) interviews Armi Hilario (former Armi Kuusela) and her husband Gil Hilario in 1959.

Esko Tommola (3 August 1930 – 7 April 2008) was a Finnish newsreader. He presented the MTV3's Ten News with Leena Kaskela between 1981 and 1995. He started his career in the 1960s working with public broadcasting and retired in 1995.

He died on 7 April 2008.
