= Jaakko Numminen =

Finnish researcher and politician (1928–2022)

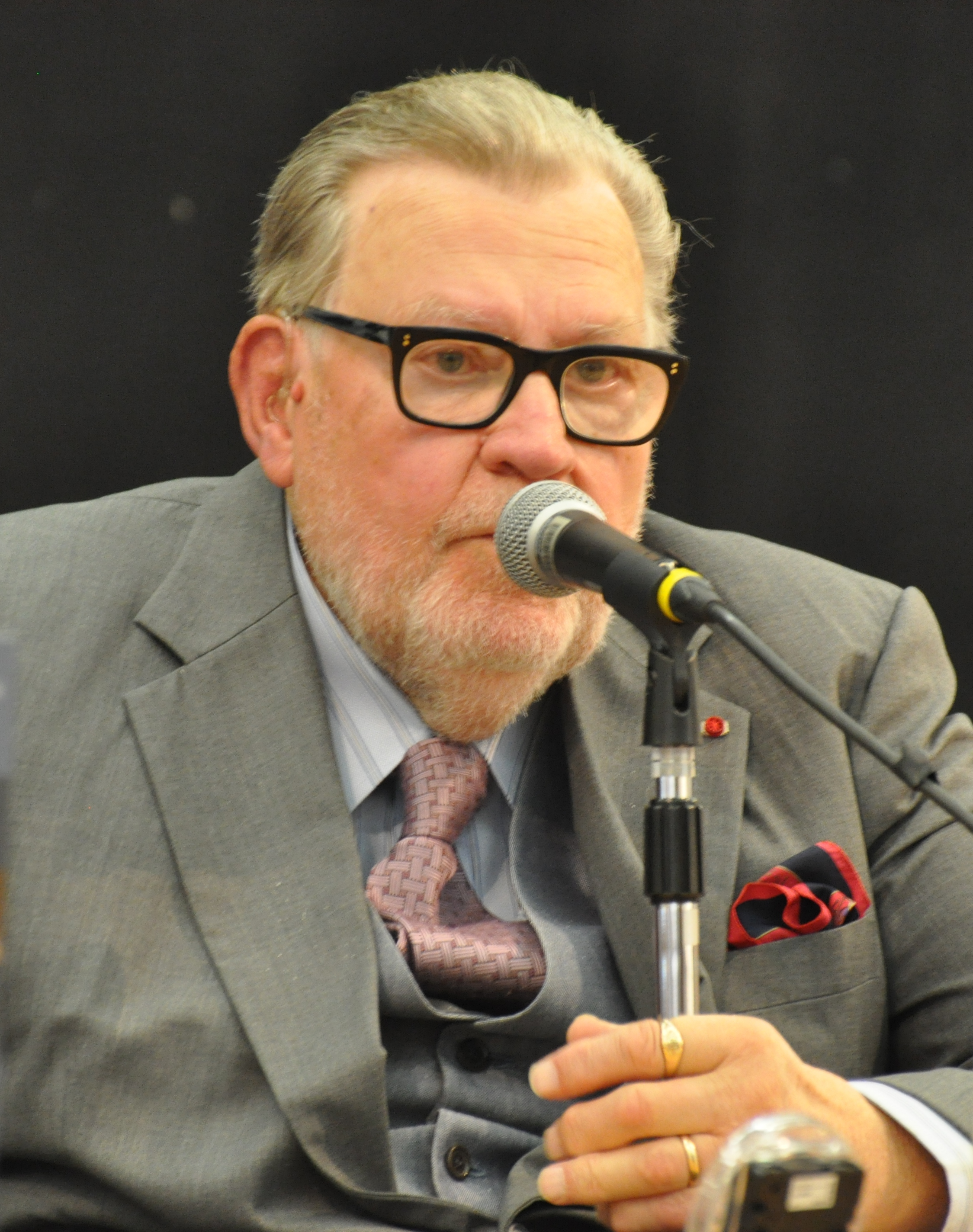
- Numminen in 2011

Minister of Education
- In office 14 May 1970 – 15 July 1970
- Prime Minister: Teuvo Aura
- Preceded by: Johannes Virolainen
- Succeeded by: Jaakko Itälä

Personal details
- Born: Jaakko Mauri Numminen; 22 October 1928 Vaasa, Finland
- Died: 19 September 2022 (aged 93) Helsinki, Finland
- Party: Independent
- Education: University of Helsinki
- Occupation: Researcher

Jaakko Mauri Numminen (22 October 1928 – 19 September 2022) was a Finnish politician. An independent, he served as Minister of Education from May to July 1970.

Numminen died in Helsinki on 19 September 2022, at the age of 93.
