= Juhani Salovaara =

Finnish sailor (1931–2023)

Juhani Salovaara (4 November 1931 – 25 September 2023) was a Finnish sailor who placed sixth in the 5.5 Metre at the 1964 Summer Olympics before dying in Espoo at the age of 91.
