= Pentti Virrankoski =

Finnish historian (1929–2023)

Pentti Akseli Virrankoski (20 June 1929 – 20 August 2023) was a Finnish historian. He was born in Vancouver. Virrankoski was professor in Finland's history at Turku University from 1978 to 1992.

Virrankoski focused in his research on economic and social history. Amongst his works are a great biography of Anders Chydenius. He has also written the first academic student book about Finland's economic history (1975), two books about North American Indians, and a work on Ostrobothnia (1997) and a biography of the musician Heikki Klemetti (2004).

Virrankoski died on 20 August 2023, at the age of 94.

== Sources ==
- Uppslagsverket Finland, 5 (2007)
