= Maria Lohela =

Finnish politician (born 1978)

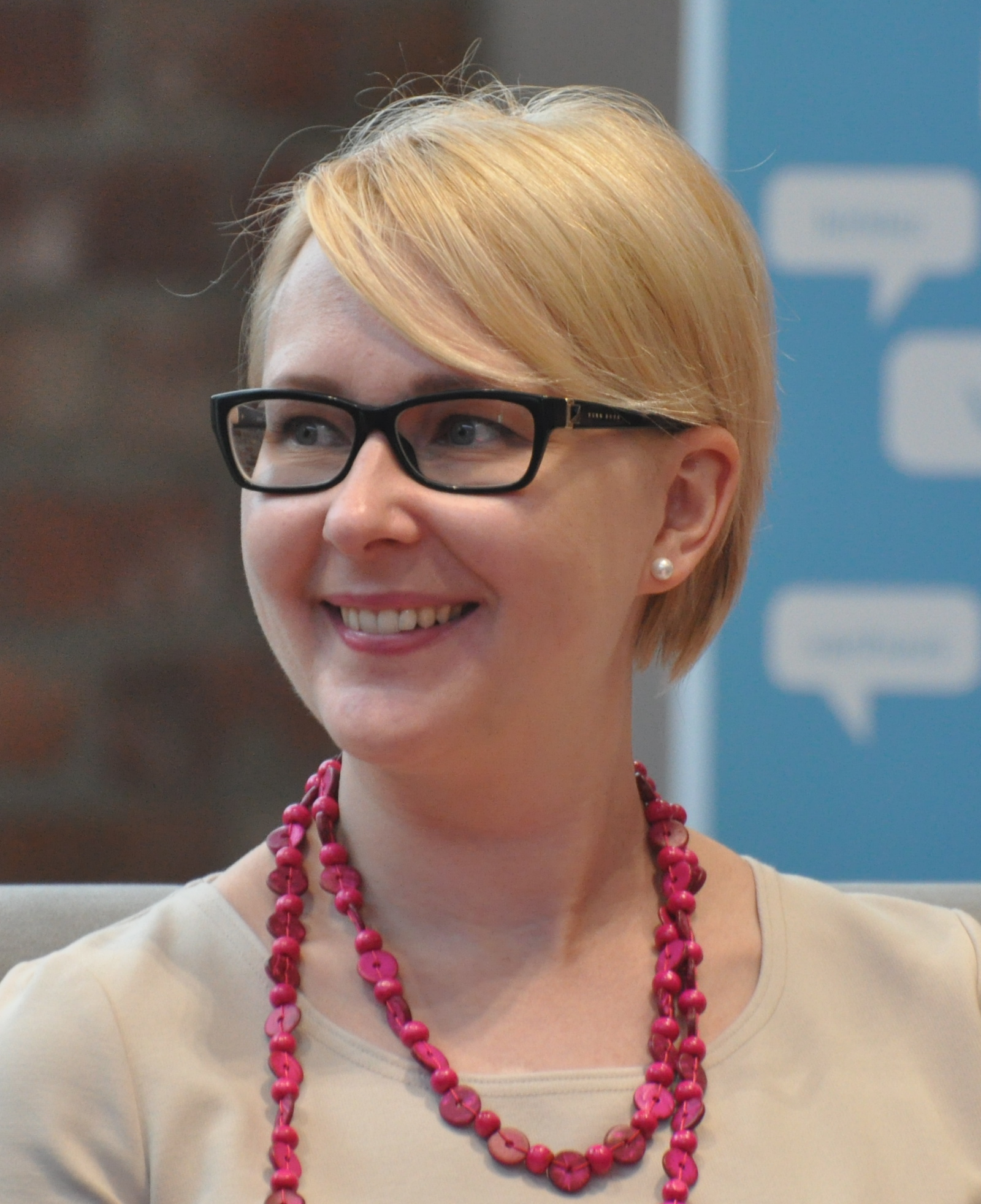

Speaker of the Parliament of Finland
- In office 29 May 2015 – 5 February 2018
- Preceded by: Juha Sipilä
- Succeeded by: Paula Risikko

Member of the Parliament of Finland from Finland Proper
- In office 20 April 2011 – 17 April 2019

Personal details
- Born: 11 June 1978 (age 48) Nivala, Finland
- Party: Liike Nyt (2019–); Blue Reform (2017–2019); Finns Party (2007–2017)
- Spouse: Samppa Mattila (m. 2015; div. 2019)
- Education: University of Turku
- Website: marialohela.fi

Maria Tuulia Lohela (Note: Finnish pronunciation: [ˈmɑriɑ ˈlohelɑ]) (born 11 June 1978) is a Finnish politician. She has served as a Member of the Parliament of Finland from 2011 to 2019. After having maintained her seat in the 2015 election, Lohela was Speaker of the Parliament of Finland from 2015 to 2018. 36 years old when elected Speaker, she was one of the youngest MPs to hold that office in the parliament's history. Before her parliamentary career, she took her bachelor's degree at the University of Turku, majoring in English language. She has also served as a member of the Turku City Council from 2009 to 2012 and again from 2017 to 2019.

Lohela has been a proponent of a tighter immigration policy for Finland. Along with a few other Finns Party politicians, she was one of the authors of the Nuiva Manifesti (Finnish for The Sour Manifesto), an election campaign programme critical of Finnish immigration policy.

On 13 June 2017, Lohela and 19 others left the Finns Party Parliamentary Group to found the New Alternative (later Blue Reform) parliamentary group, which subsequently took the place of the Finns Party in the Sipilä cabinet. The split sparked debate on the seat of the Speaker, which was traditionally reserved for the second biggest parliamentary party. After negotiations, the parties came into the conclusion that Lohela would vacate her seat for the National Coalition Party in February 2018. On 5 February 2018, Paula Risikko was elected as the next speaker, while Lohela returned to her role as an MP.

On 21 January 2019, Lohela announced that she would leave the Blue Reform in order to join Liike Nyt movement.

Political offices
| Preceded by Juha Sipilä | Speaker of the Parliament of Finland; 2015–2018 | Succeeded by Paula Risikko |
