= 1991 in Finland =

- Decades: 1970s; 1980s; 1990s; 2000s; 2010s
- See also: Other events of 1991; Timeline of Finnish history

Events from the year 1991 in Finland

== Incumbents ==
- President of Finland: Mauno Koivisto
- Prime Minister of Finland: Harri Holkeri (until April 26), Esko Aho

== Events ==
- 17 March - 1991 Finnish parliamentary election
- 18 April - The first of the Hausjärvi Gravel Pit Murders is discovered.
- 20 October - 1991 Ålandic legislative election

=== Full date unknown ===
- The Iriadamant group established itself in Kittilä.

== Establishments ==
- 12 "Wilderness Areas" are established in Lapland:
  - Hammastunturi Wilderness Area
  - Kaldoaivi Wilderness Area
  - Käsivarsi Wilderness Area
  - Kemihaara Wilderness Area
  - Muotkatunturi Wilderness Area
  - Paistunturi Wilderness Area
  - Pöyrisjärvi Wilderness Area
  - Pulju Wilderness Area
  - Tarvantovaara Wilderness Area
  - Tsarmitunturi Wilderness Area
  - Tuntsa Wilderness Area
  - Vätsäri Wilderness Area

== Culture ==
- Finland in the Eurovision Song Contest 1991
- List of number-one singles of 1991 (Finland)

== Sports ==
Finnish people were in

- 1991 World Amateur Boxing Championships
- 1991 Men's European Volleyball Championship
- 1991 European Figure Skating Championships

== Births ==
- 3 June - Sami Vatanen, ice hockey defenceman

== Deaths ==
- 11 January – Irwin Goodman, musician
- 12 March – Ragnar Granit, neuroscientist and recipient of the Nobel Prize in Physiology or Medicine (born 1900)
- 30 August – Joel Pekuri, diplomat (born 1927)
