= Pallastunturi =

Group of fells in Lapland, Finland

Coordinates: 68°4′29″N 24°3′14″E

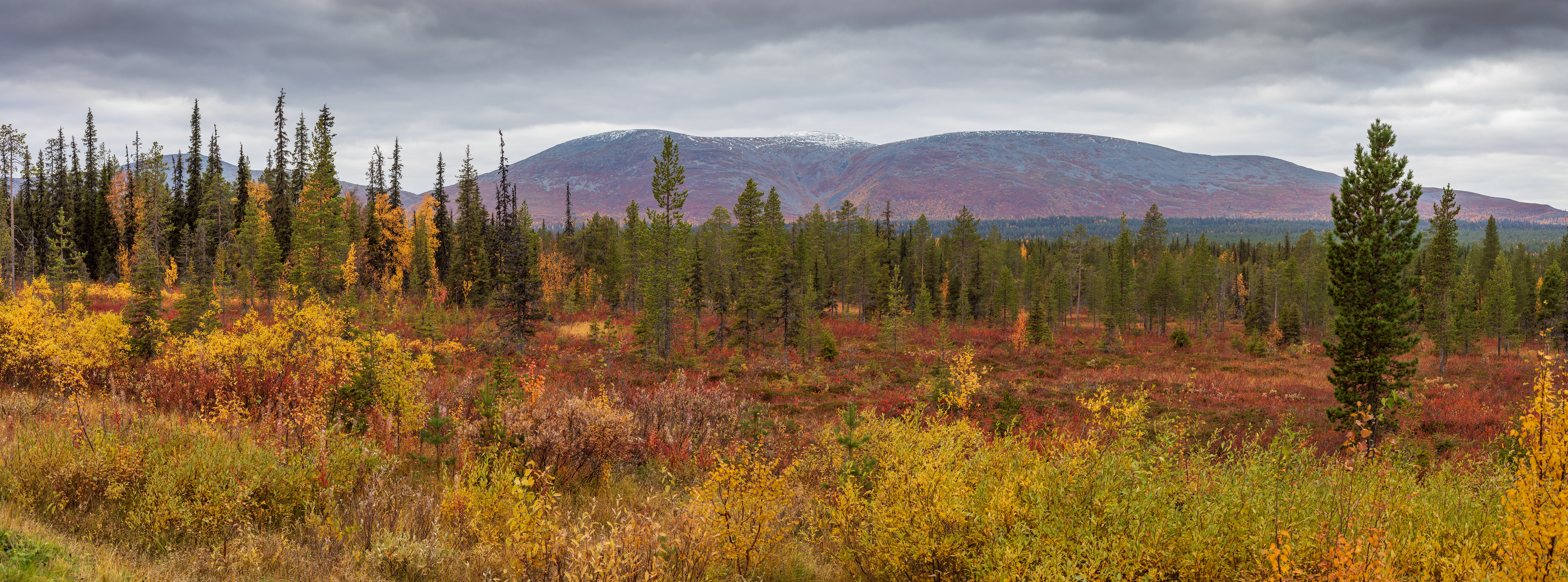
Autumn view towards Pallastunturi

A map of area

Pallastunturi is a group of seven fells in the municipalities of Muonio and Enontekiö in Lapland, Finland. The highest peak is 809-metre (2,654 ft) Taivaskero, which is also highest peak of Pallas-Yllästunturi National Park and whole Lapland excluding Käsivarsi area.

The fells are located in the Pallas-Yllästunturi National Park, which was originally established in 1938. Pallastunturi fells are one of the 27 National landscapes of Finland.

The Pallastunturi Hotel was built near the fells in 1938. This Functionalist style building was destroyed by German troops during the Lapland War in October 1944. A replacement hotel was opened 1948.

In January 2024, an accident occurred at Pyhäkero of Pallastunturi, where a 12-year-old boy and his mother were killed by an avalanche. The mother had time to call the emergency center before the accident, but difficult weather conditions made the search difficult.

== 1952 Olympic flame ==
A second Olympic flame of the 1952 Summer Olympics was lit on the top of Taivaskero fell in the midnight of 6 July 1952. It was lit by the rays of Midnight sun and carried to Tornio, where it was merged with the main flame lit in Olympia, Greece. The Greek flame was flown from Greece to Denmark, then carried by runners on a torch relay via Sweden to Finland.

== Gallery ==
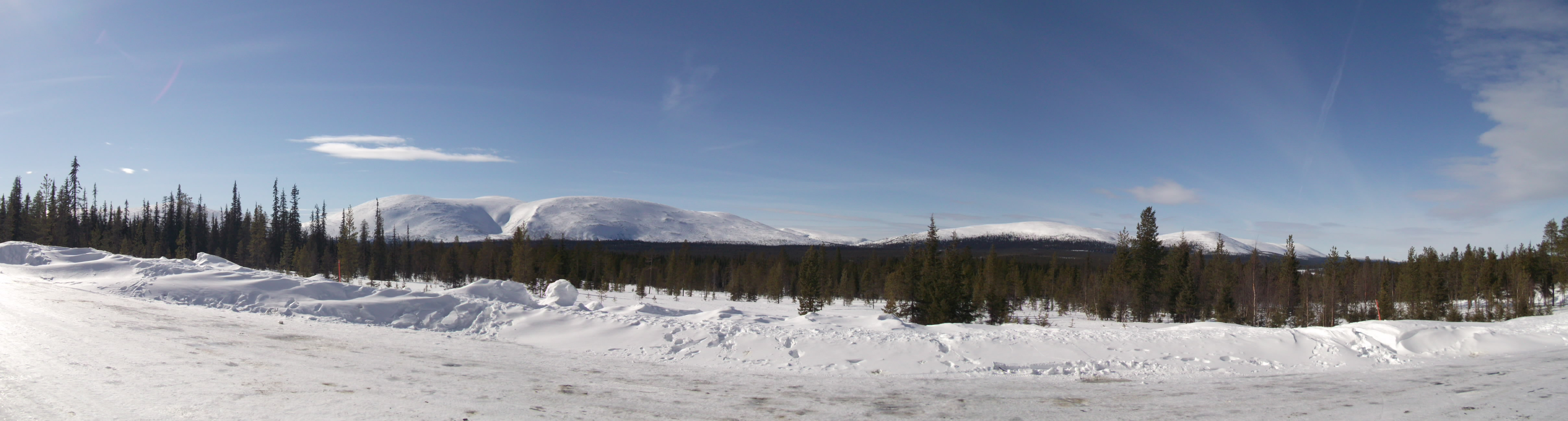
Pallas from NE spring 2017.

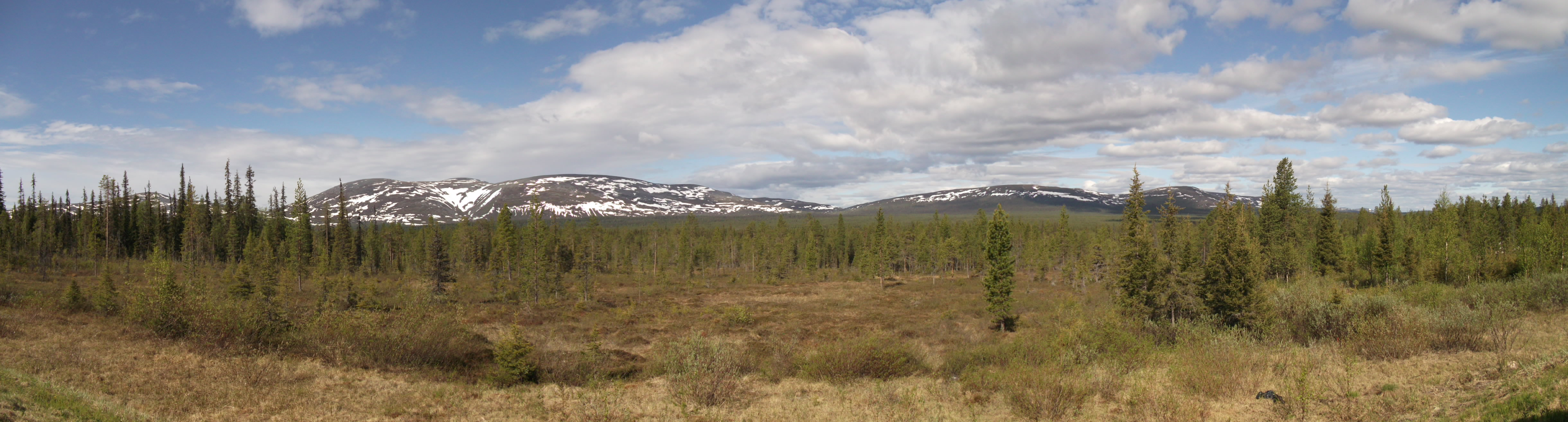
Pallas from NE early summer 2017.

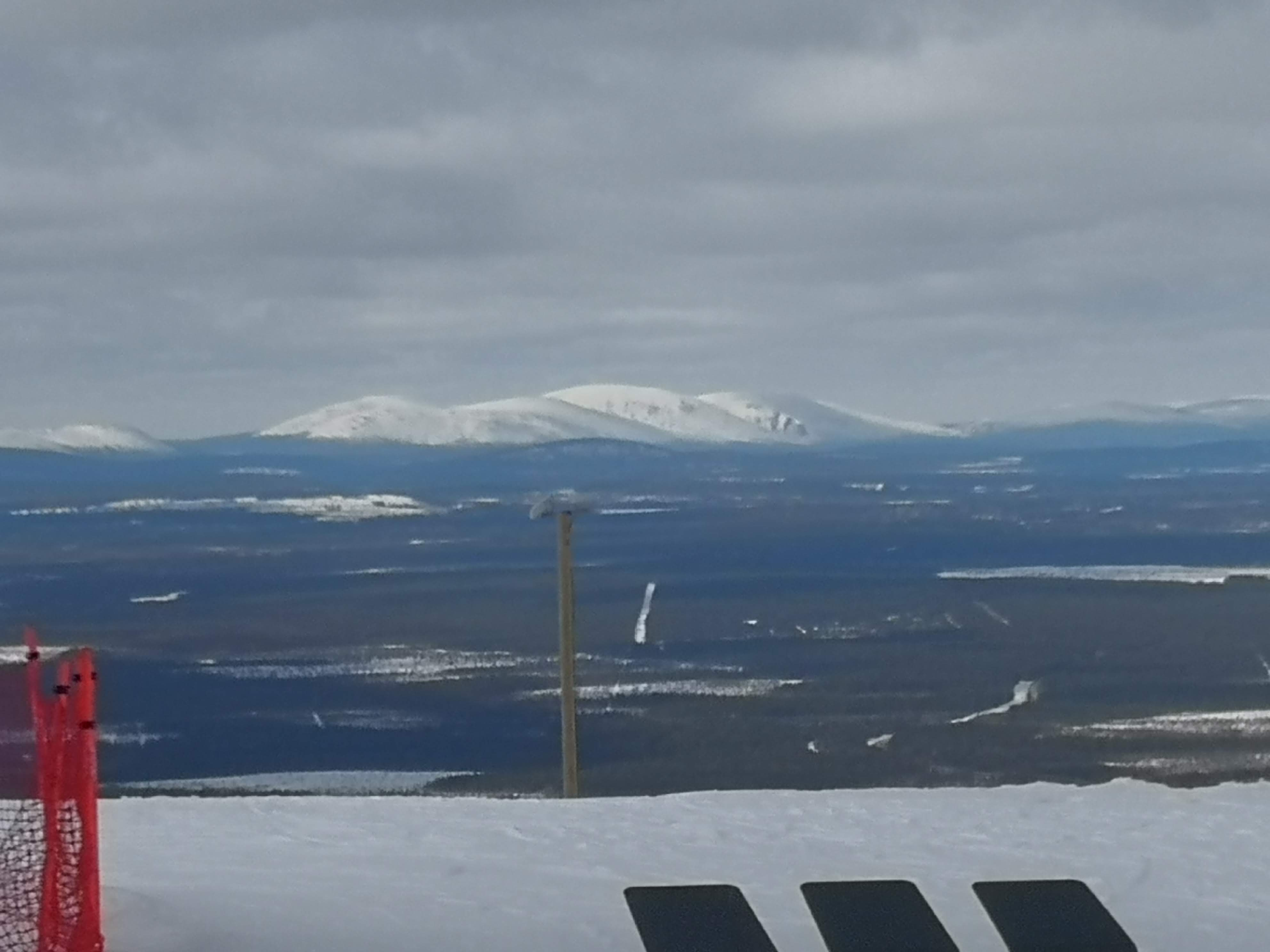
Pallas from Levi

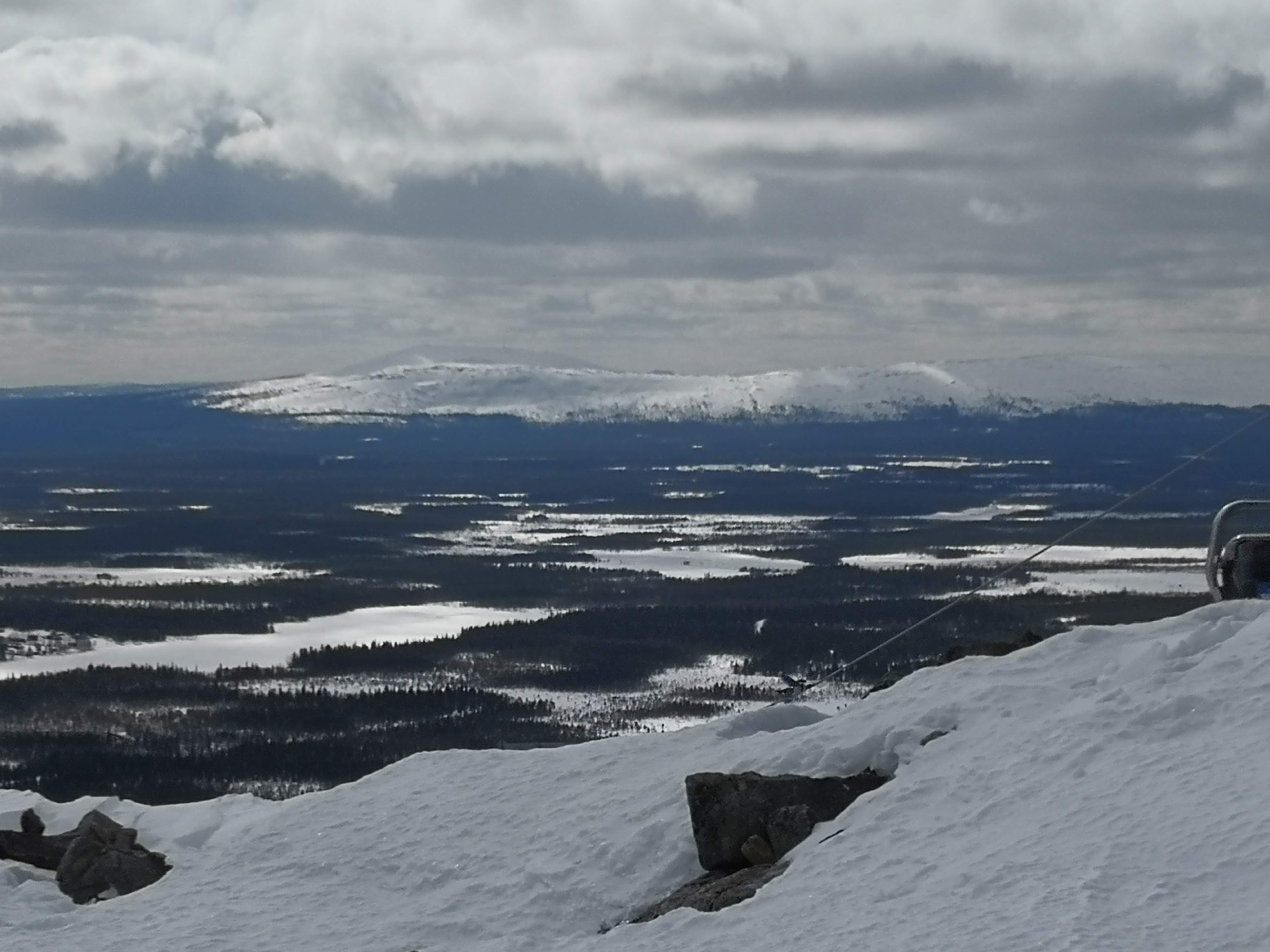
Pallas from Levi

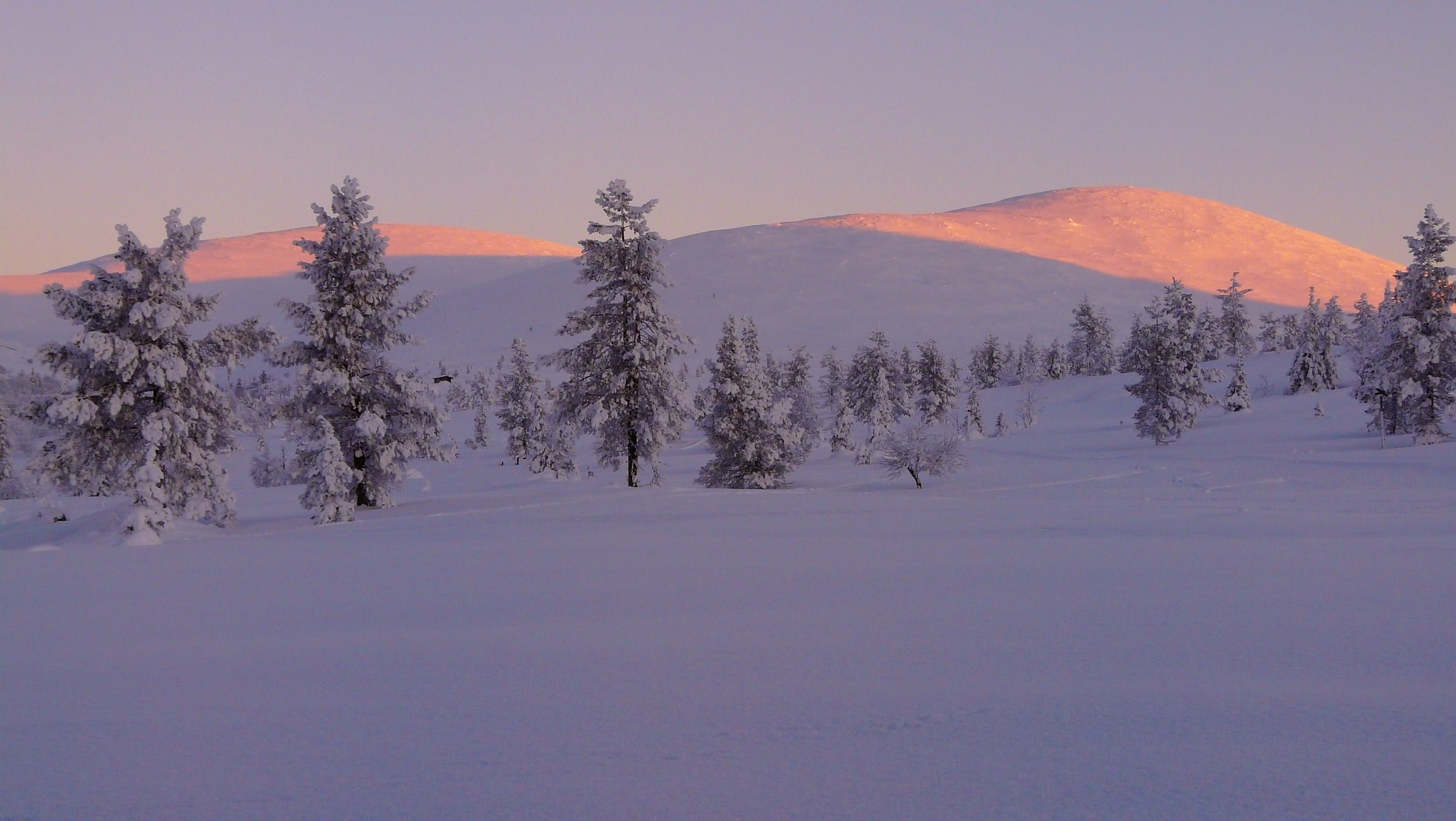
Taivaskero and Pyhäkero peaks of Pallastunturi on a winter morning

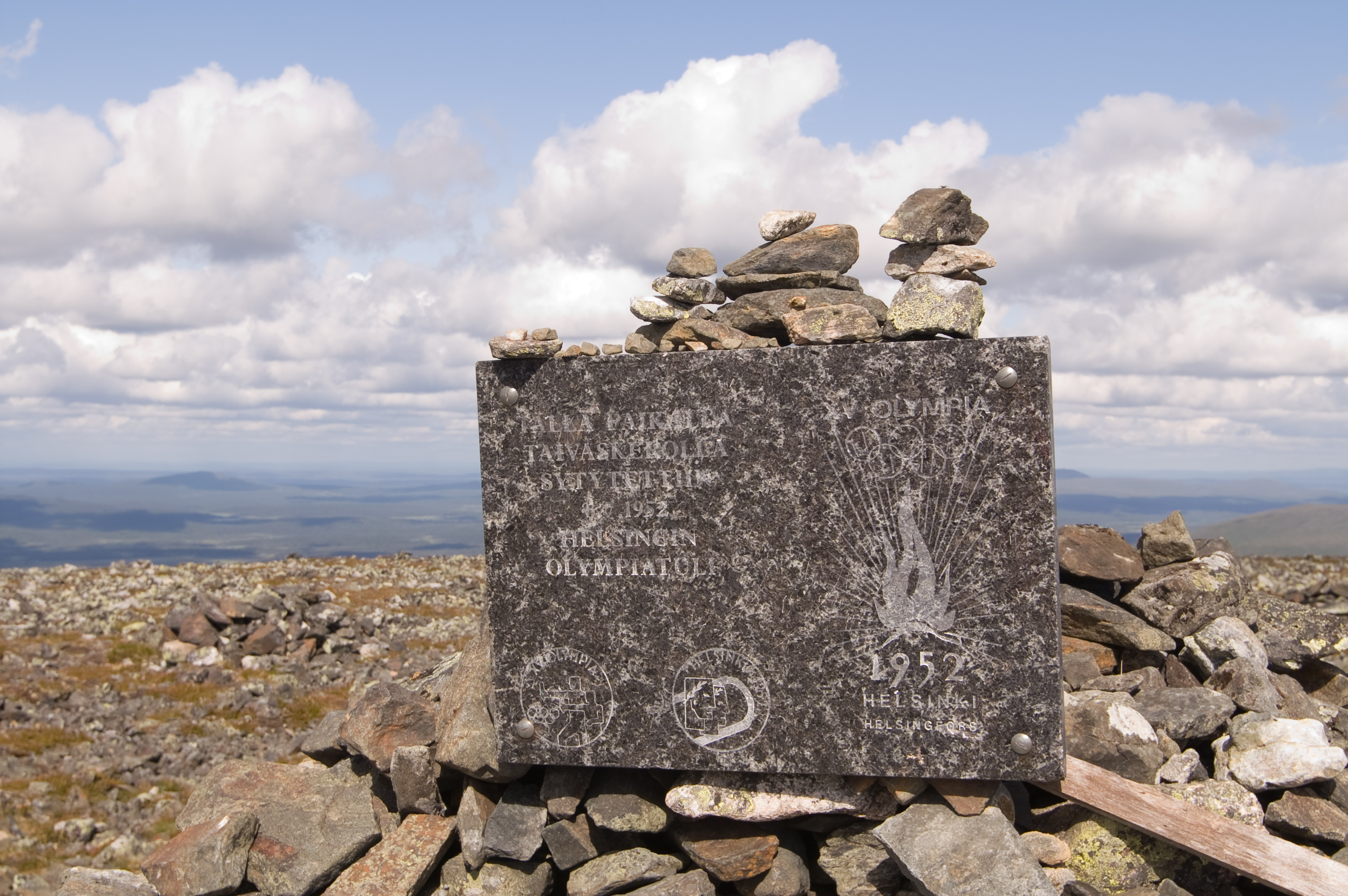
Memorial of the 1952 Olympic flame on top of Taivaskero

== See also ==
- Ylläs
