= Mountain resort =

Place to holiday or vacation located in a mountainous area

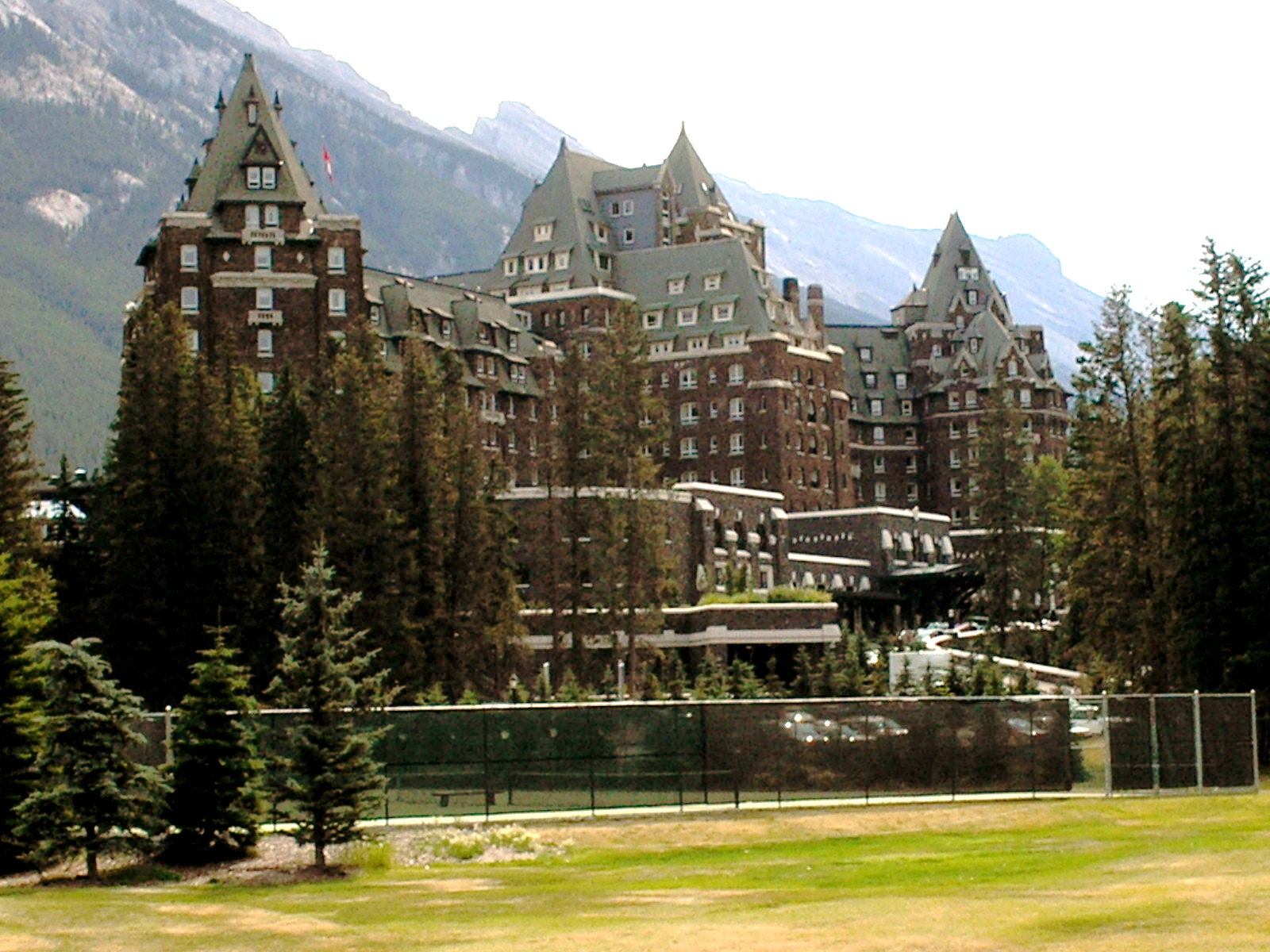
Banff Springs Hotel, a destination mountain resort in Banff National Park, Alberta, Canada

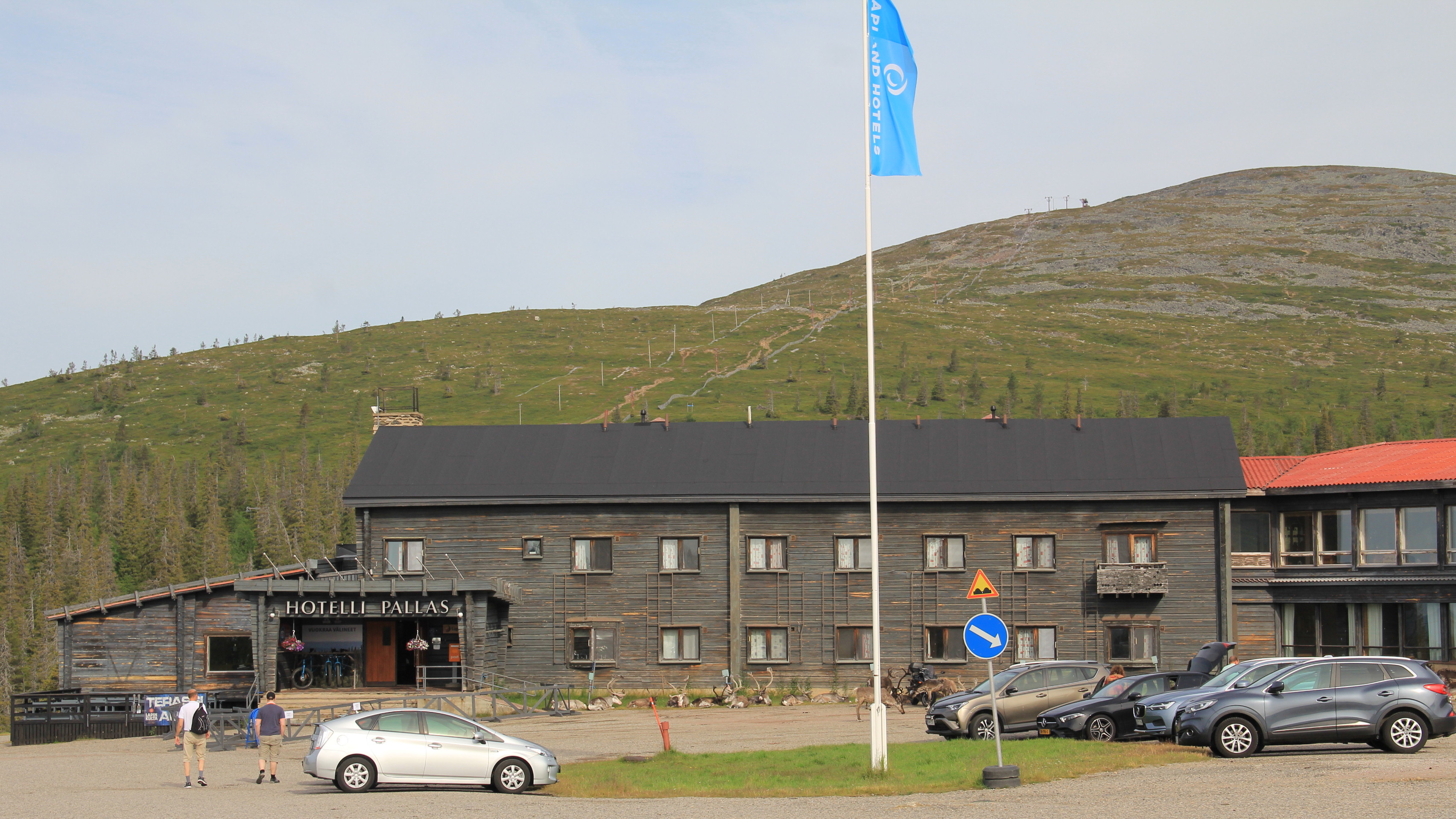
Hotel Pallas in Muonio, Finland

A mountain resort is a place to holiday or vacation located in an elevated and typically at least relatively isolated area. The term resort implies integral hotel or inn accommodations, restaurants, and either or both sports facilities or scenic attractions like birdwatching. These can be part of a "destination resort" that provides accommodations and activities or a "resort town" that offers amenities near outdoor areas.

They include winter sports like skiing, snowboarding, and ice skating and summer activities such as hiking, golf, and tennis. Sightseeing and related activities, such as leaf peeping to appreciate fall colors, are also common where foliage turns.

In hot climates, hill and mountain resorts are visited for the cooler temperatures at higher elevations.

== North America ==
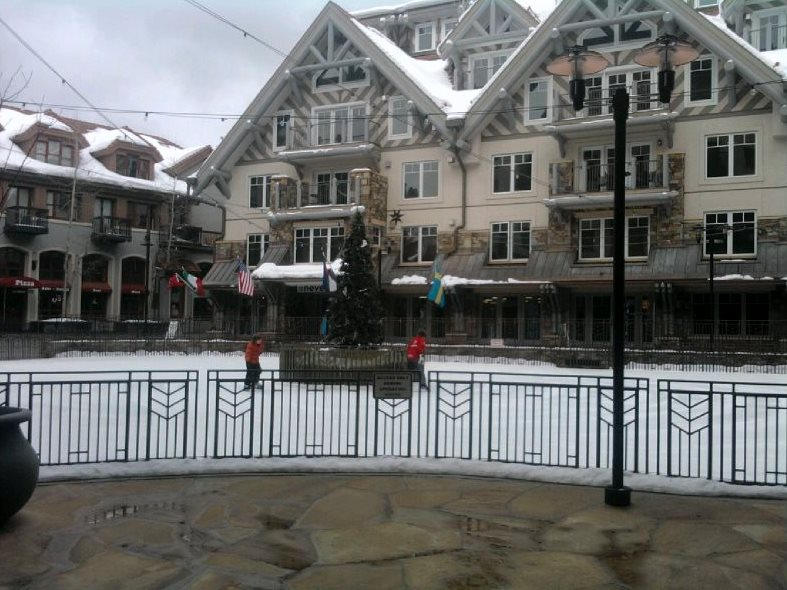
Mountain Village, Colorado

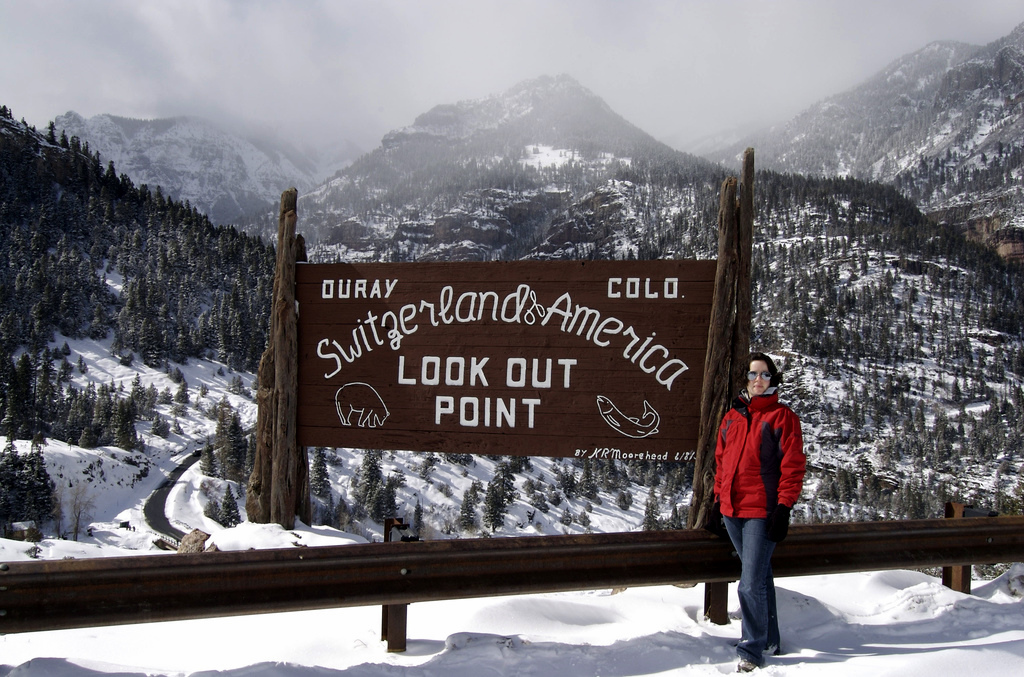
Ouray, Colorado, nicknamed Switzerland of America, a popular ice climbing destination

In the United States and Canada the term "mountain resort" usually denotes a resort visited all year round, both for winter sports and summer activities, such as hiking, golf, tennis, and mountain biking.

Some North American mountain resorts - both resort towns and individual venues - include:

- Aspen, Colorado
- AttitashMountain Resort, New Hampshire
- Big Bear Lake, California
- Big Sky Resort, Montana
- Cranmore Mountain Resort, New Hampshire
- Flagstaff, Arizona
- Killington Ski Resort, Vermont
- Loghill Village, Colorado
- Mountain Village, Colorado
- Ouray, Colorado
- Teton Village, Wyoming
- Whistler, British Columbia
- Whitefish Mountain Resort, Montana

== India ==
In British India, the colonial rulers developed resorts in the Himalayas and in mountainous areas of South India known as "hill stations", where they could escape the summer heat of the plains.

== Other countries ==
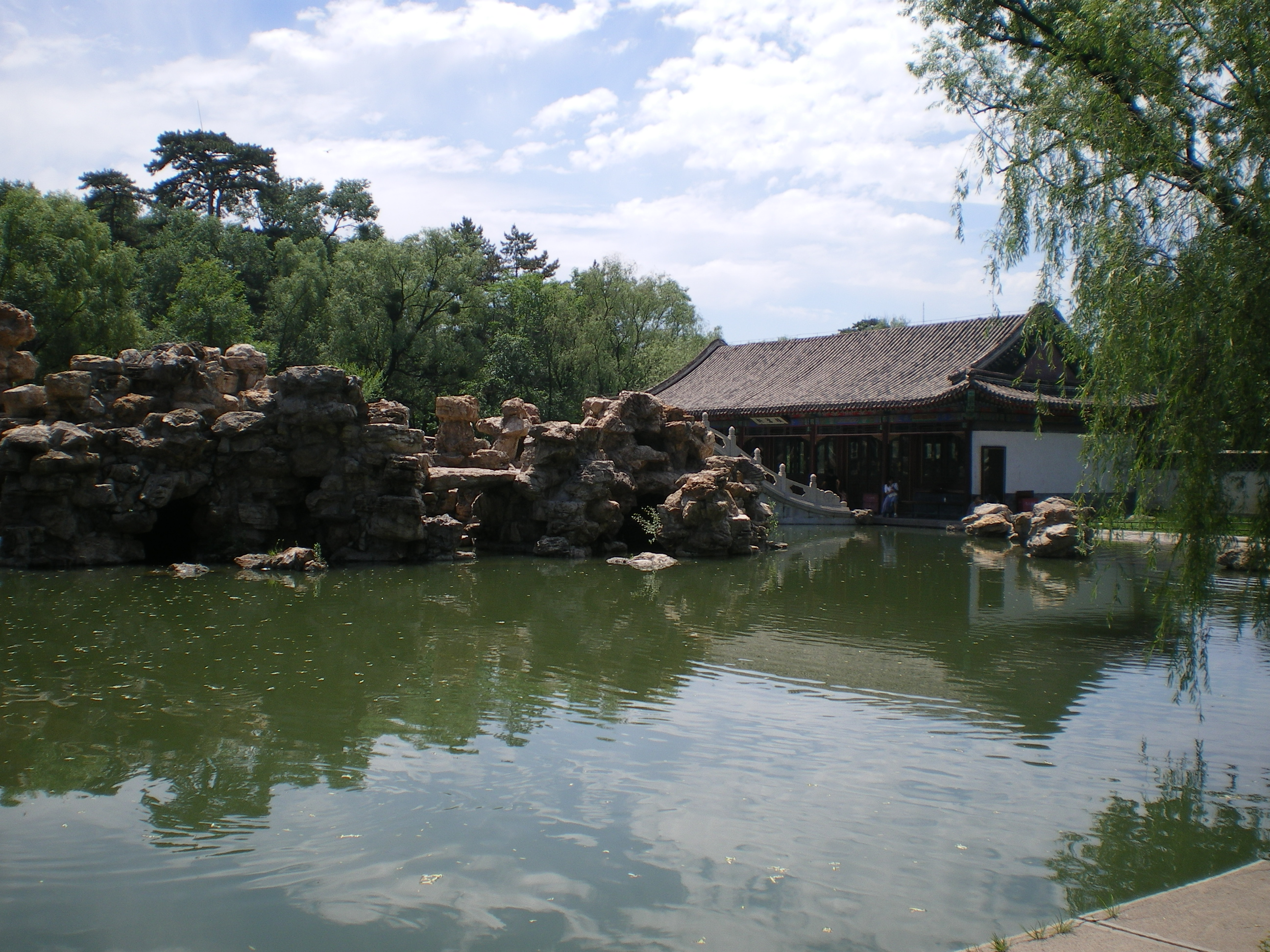
Chengde Mountain Resort

In the 18th century, in China, the emperors of the Qing dynasty built the Chengde Mountain Resort as a retreat from the summer heat of Beijing.

In Pakistan, the Galyat areas are a popular summer destination. They are also a favorite spot for a cold snowy experience in the winter. Murree, Ayubia, Nathiagali, and Kalabagh are some of the popular places. Other places like the Northern Areas which include Gilgit Baltistan and Kashmir are also a choice.

In the Philippines, the American colonial government built its first summer capital in Baguio to escape Manila's heat.

In Turkey, city dwellers traditionally spent summer vacations at mountain resorts known as yaylas to escape the summer heat.

In Cyprus, the most popular mountain resort is Platres.

In Thailand, the third highest mountain is a popular resort at Doi Ang Kang in Chiang Mai's Fang District.

== See also ==
- Ski resort
- Mountain hut
- Seaside resort
- Spa town
- Resort town
