= Jerisjärvi =

Lake in Lapland region, Finland

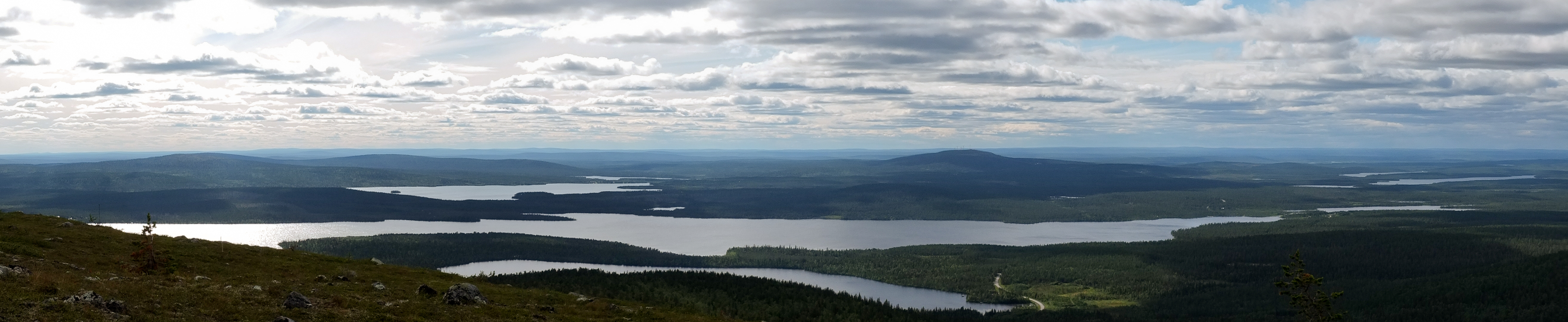
- Jerisjärvi seen from Keimiö fell

- Location within Finland
- Location: Muonio, Kittilä
- Coordinates: 67°54′N 024°08′E
- Primary outflows: Jerisjoki
- Catchment area: 132 km^{2} (51 sq mi)
- Basin countries: Finland
- Surface area: 23.51 km^{2} (9.08 sq mi)
- Average depth: 3.44 m (11.3 ft)
- Max. depth: 11.7 m (38 ft)
- Water volume: 0.0808 km^{3} (0.0194 cu mi)
- Shore length^{1}: 74.83 km (46.50 mi)
- Surface elevation: 257.6 m (845 ft)
- Islands: Isosaari
- ^{1} Shore length is not a well-defined measure.

Jerisjärvi is a medium-sized lake of Finland in Muonio and Kittilä. It belongs to Tornionjoki main catchment area in Lapland. in the southern side of the Pallas-Yllästunturi National Park.

The best season to visit and kayak or canoe is between June and September.

== See also ==
- List of lakes in Finland
