= 1993 in Finland =

- Decades: 1970s; 1980s; 1990s; 2000s; 2010s
- See also: Other events of 1993; Timeline of Finnish history

Events from the year 1993 in Finland

== Incumbents ==
- President: Mauno Koivisto
- Prime Minister: Esko Aho
- Speaker: Ilkka Suominen

== Events ==
- Finland in the Eurovision Song Contest 1993
- List of number-one singles of 1993 (Finland)
- The Constitutional Right Party dissolved.
- Television series debuted:
  - Gladiaattorit
  - Anteeksi kuinka?
  - Iltalypsy

== Establishments ==
- Agronic Oy was established in Haapavesi.
- Eläkeläiset
- Deuteronomium (band)

== Sports ==
- Finish people were in
  - 1993 World Amateur Boxing Championships
  - 1993 Men's European Volleyball Championship
  - 1993 European Figure Skating Championships

== Births ==
- 11 February - Saana Saarteinen, tennis player
- 7 March - Samu Perhonen, ice hockey player
- 7 June - Miro Aaltonen, ice hockey player
- 21 October - käärijä, singer
