= 1990 in Finland =

- Decades: 1970s; 1980s; 1990s; 2000s; 2010s
- See also: Other events of 1990; Timeline of Finnish history

Events from the year 1990 in Finland

== Incumbents ==
- President: Mauno Koivisto
- Prime Minister: Harri Holkeri
- Speaker: Kalevi Sorsa

== Events ==
- 9 September - Joint news conference of President Bush and Soviet President Mikhail Gorbachev in Helsinki, Finland.

== Births ==
- 4 June - Ville Mäkilä, Finnish former professional football player

== See also ==
- History of Finland
