= Wilderness areas of Finland =

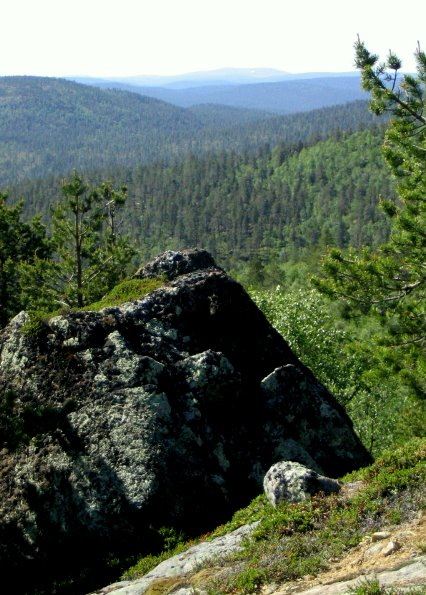
Seen from the Aviaispää fell, the Hammastunturi fell, which the surrounding wilderness area has been named after, can be seen in the horizon, around 27 km away

The wilderness areas (Finnish: Erämaa-alueet, Swedish: Ödemarksområden) of Finland are remote areas which are not strictly nature reserves. The areas were set up in 1991 to preserve their wilderness character, the Sami culture and their natural form of livelihood. There are 12 such areas, all of which are located in northern Lapland. The reserves cover an area of 14,890 square kilometres (5,750 sq mi). All the reserves are managed by the Metsähallitus (Forest Administration).

- Hammastunturi Wilderness Area
- Kaldoaivi Wilderness Area
- Kemihaara Wilderness Area
- Käsivarsi Wilderness Area
- Muotkatunturi Wilderness Area
- Paistunturi Wilderness Area
- Pulju Wilderness Area
- Pöyrisjärvi Wilderness Area
- Tarvantovaara Wilderness Area
- Tsarmitunturi Wilderness Area
- Tuntsa Wilderness Area
- Vätsäri Wilderness Area

== See also ==
- Protected areas of Finland
