= Agronic =

Finnish manufacturer of agricultural equipment

Agronic Oy
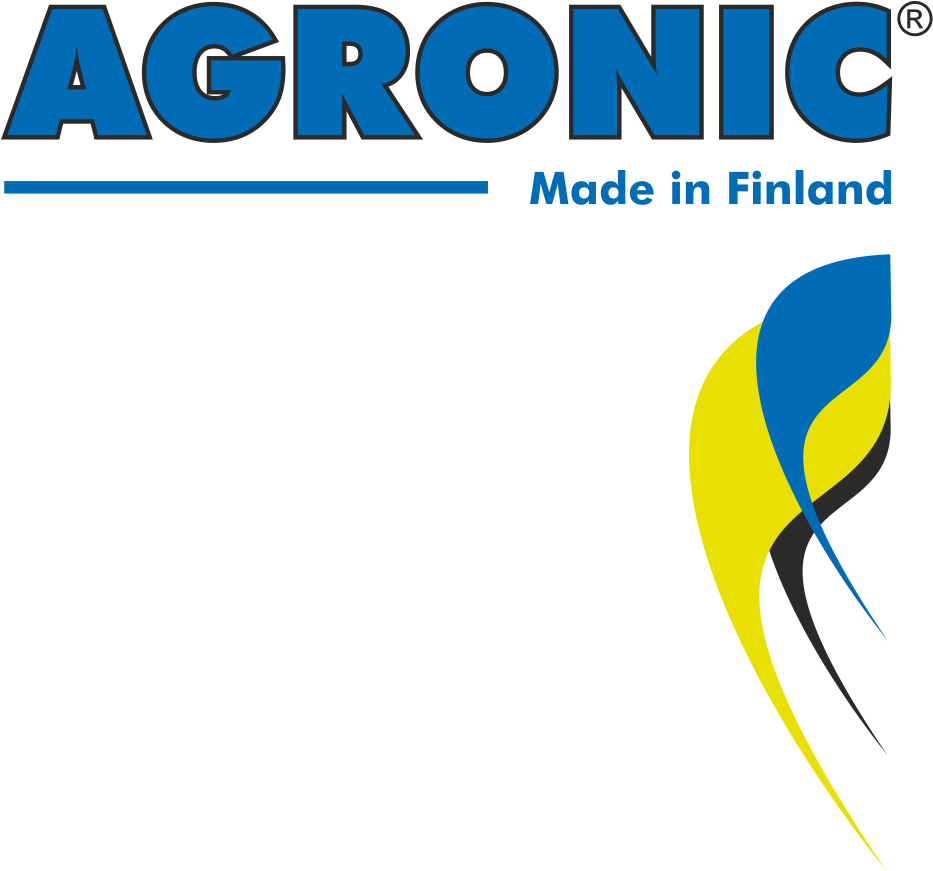
- Trade name: Agronic
- Industry: Heavy equipment
- Founded: 1993; 32 years ago in Haapavesi, Finland
- Founder: Erkki Kivelä, Urpo Kuronen
- Products: Agricultural machinery
- Revenue: EUR 8.8 million (2016)
- Number of employees: 48 (2016)
- Website: www.agronic.fi/en/

Agronic Oy (Agronic Ltd.) is a Finnish manufacturer of agricultural equipment. The company is located in Haapavesi, Finland. Agronic has a daughter company, Prodevice Oy.

Agronic was established by Urpo Kuronen and Erkki Kivelä in 1993. The main products are round balers, bale wrappers, slurry tanks and umbilical slurry systems. Around 50% of products are exported to more than 20 countries all over the world.

In 2011, Agronic was awarded the National Entrepreneur Prize. In 2013.
