= Kemihaara Wilderness Area =

Wilderness area in Savukoski, Finland

- IUCN category VI (protected area with sustainable use of natural resources)
- Location within Finland
- Location: Lapland, Finland
- Coordinates: 67°56′N 28°44′E
- Area: 302 km^{2} (117 sq mi)
- Established: 1991
- Governing body: Metsähallitus

The Kemihaara Wilderness Area (Finnish: Kemihaaran erämaa-alue) is a wilderness reserve in Finland. It was established in 1991 like all the other 11 wilderness areas in Lapland. Its area is 302 square kilometres (117 mi^{2}). It is governed by the Metsähallitus.

The park is bordered by Urho Kekkonen National Park in the north and the river Kemijoki in the east.

== See also ==
- Wilderness areas of Finland
