= Muotkatunturi Wilderness Area =

Protected area in Finland

- IUCN category VI (protected area with sustainable use of natural resources)
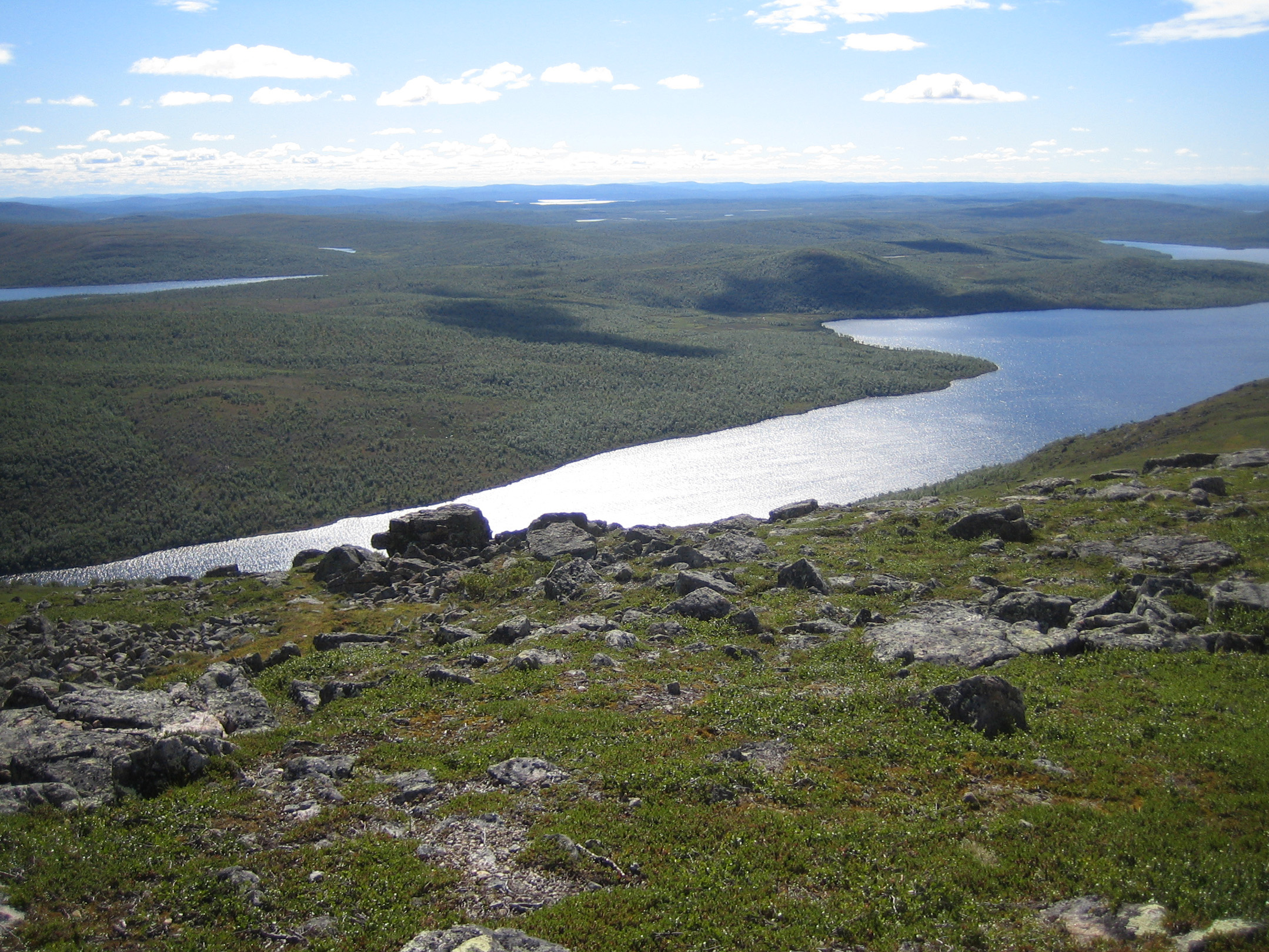
- Peltojärvi lake in the Muotkatunturis
- Interactive map of Muotkatunturi Wilderness Area
- Location: Inari/Utsjoki, Lapland, Finland
- Coordinates: 69°6′N 26°24′E
- Area: 1,570 km^{2} (610 sq mi)
- Established: 1991
- Governing body: Metsähallitus

The Muotkatunturi Wilderness Area (Muotkatunturin erämaa-alue) is a wilderness reserve in the municipalities Inari and Utsjoki in Lapland, Finland, established in 1991. Its area is 1,570 square kilometres (610 mi^{2}). Muotkatunturi is a reindeer management area, and forestry is also practiced there. The area is maintained by the Metsähallitus.

No public roads lead into the area, there are no marked paths for travelers, and the area only has four wilderness huts. Therefore it is virtually completely natural and primitive. In the north-eastern corner there are vast swamps, in the north and west fell ridges and river valleys splitting them, and in the south-west there's pine forest. The Peltojärvi lake is in the middle of the wilderness. The highest peak is Kuárvikozzâ, 590 metres (1,940 ft) over sea level.

In the south, the area is bordered by the Inari-Angeli road, in the west by Angeli-Karigasniemi road, in the north by Kaamanen-Karigasniemi road and in the east by Valtatie 4.

== See also ==
- Wilderness areas of Finland
