= Tuntsa Wilderness Area =

Wilderness area in Lapland region, Finland

- IUCN category VI (protected area with sustainable use of natural resources)
- Location within Finland
- Location: Lapland, Finland
- Coordinates: 67°39′N 29°34′E
- Area: 212 km^{2} (82 sq mi)
- Established: 1991
- Governing body: Metsähallitus

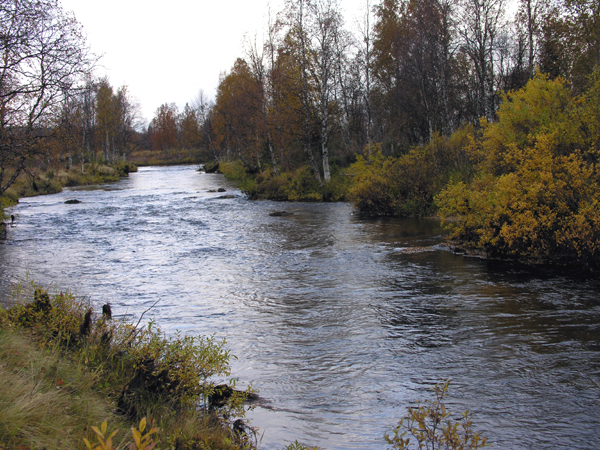
The river Tuntsajoki in Tuntsa Wilderness Area in Finland

Tuntsa Wilderness Area (Finnish: Tuntsan erämaa) is a wilderness reserve in the municipalities of Salla and Savukoski in Lapland, Finland. It is governed by Metsähallitus and covers 212 square kilometres (82 mi^{2}). It was established in 1991 like all the other wilderness areas in Lapland.

== See also ==
- Wilderness areas of Finland
