= Ville Mäkilä =

Finnish footballer (born 1990)

Personal information
- Date of birth: 4 June 1990 (age 36)
- Place of birth: Finland
- Height: 1.88 m (6 ft 2 in)
- Position: Defender

Senior career*
| Years | Team | Apps | (Gls) |
| 2008–2010 | Inter Turku | 1 | (0) |
- * Club domestic league appearances and goals

Ville Mäkilä (born 4 June 1990) is a Finnish former professional football player.
