= Tsarmitunturi Wilderness Area =

Wilderness area in Inari, Finland

- IUCN category VI (protected area with sustainable use of natural resources)
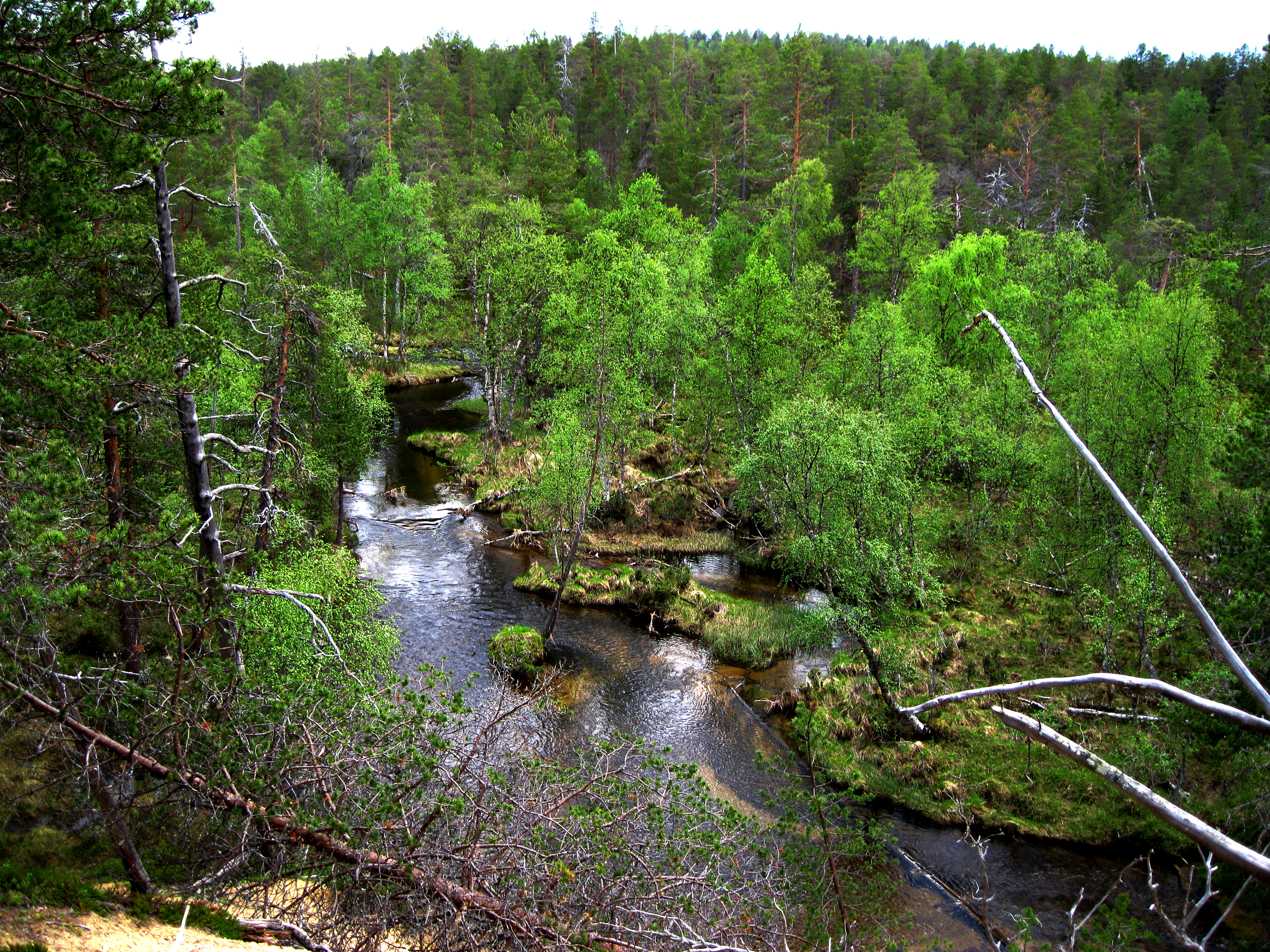

- Location within Finland
- Location: Lapland, Finland
- Coordinates: 68°40′N 28°25′E
- Area: 150 km^{2} (58 sq mi)
- Established: 1991
- Governing body: Metsähallitus

Tsarmitunturi Wilderness Area (Finnish: Tsarmitunturin erämaa) is a wilderness reserve that is located in the Inari municipality, Lapland, Finland. It is governed by Metsähallitus and covers 150 square kilometres (58 mi^{2}). It was established in 1991 like all the other wilderness areas in Lapland.
