= Pallas-Yllästunturi National Park =

National park in Lapland region, Finland

- IUCN category II (national park)
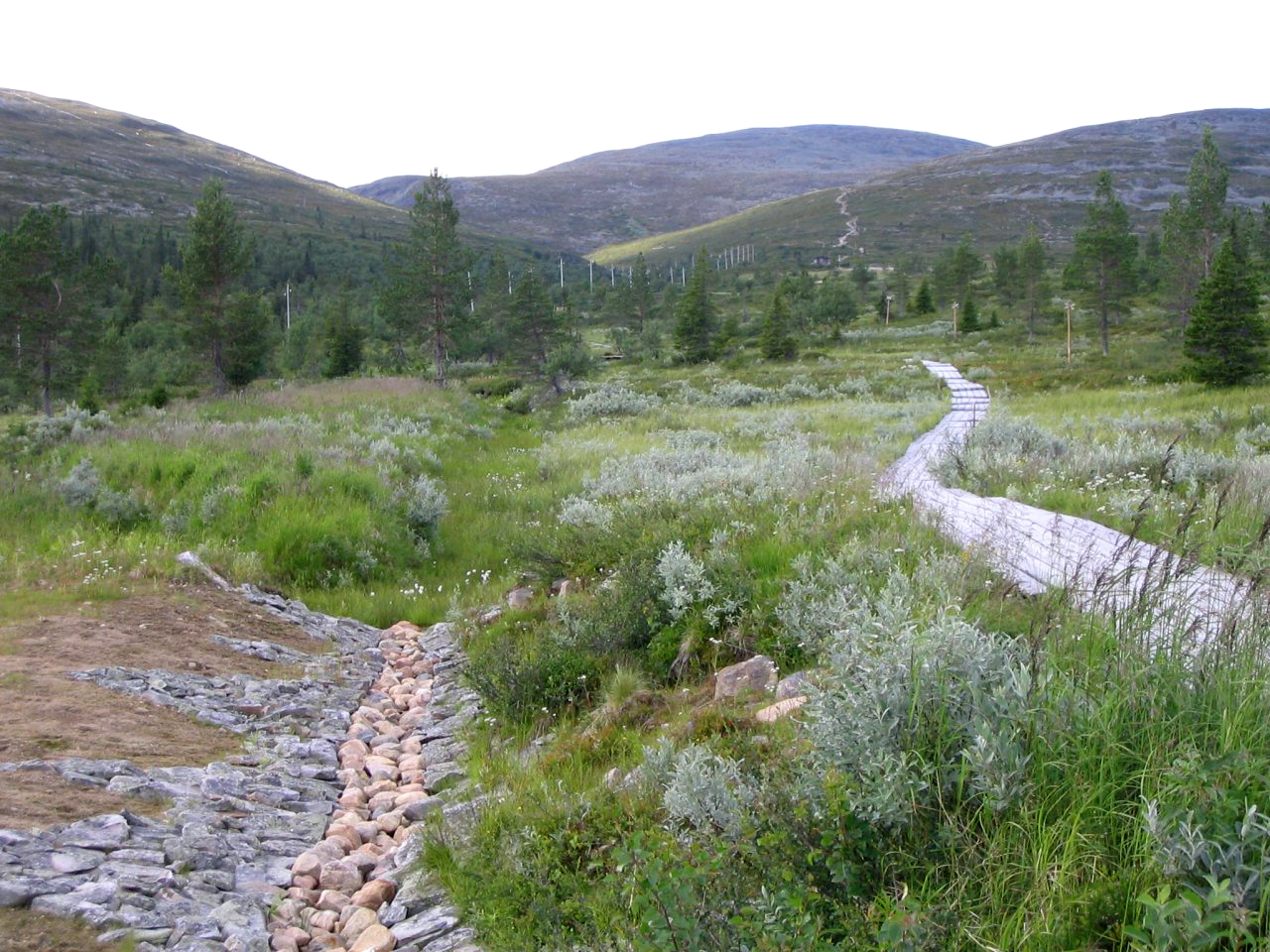
- Start of the trekking route in Pallas

- Location within Finland
- Location: Lapland, Finland
- Coordinates: 68°09′32″N 24°02′25″E
- Area: 1,020 km^{2} (390 sq mi)
- Established: 1938 (expanded in 2005)
- Visitors: 598 800 (in 2024)
- Governing body: Metsähallitus
- Website: https://www.luontoon.fi/en/destinations/pallas-yllastunturi-national-park

Pallas-Yllästunturi National Park is Finland's third largest national park and it covers an area of 1,020 square kilometres. The national park is located in Western Lapland in the municipalities of Enontekiö, Kittilä, Kolari and Muonio. The landscape of Pallas-Yllästunturi National Park is dominated by a chain of fells stretching for approximately 100 km and the taiga forests in the boreal forest zone. In terms of visits, Pallas-Yllästunturi National Park is Finland's most popular national park. In 2019, the visitor counters recorded 561,200 visits.

There are many reasons for the popularity of the national park. According to a visitor survey, visitors to the Pallas-Yllästunturi National Park particularly appreciate the landscapes in the area, its extensive network of paths and trails as well as general tidiness and safety. The landscape of Pallastunturi Fells has been chosen as one of Finland's national landscapes.

== Hiking opportunities ==
Pallas-Yllästunturi National Park has dozens of different trails for hiking and skiing that are suitable for people looking for different levels of difficulty. The trails provide a great chance to see the diverse nature of the national park. Some of the trails lead to the top of the fells, while others wind through the forest nature and swamp landscapes of the area.

You can walk, mountain bike, paddle, ski and snowshoe in the national park. A diverse range of hiking trails provides the opportunity for day trips of different lengths and longer hikes. In Pallas-Yllästunturi National Park, day hikers can also climb to the top of the fells. Popular day trips include the Pyhäkeron päiväretki Day Hike, Taivaskeron kierros Circle Trail, Pirunkurun ponnistus Trail, Varkaankurun polku Trail, Kesänkijärven kierros Circle Trail and Tuomikurun kierros Circle Trail.

The majority of the routes are circle trails, and there are serviced campsites on all the trails. The campsites include Goahti, lean-to shelters, campfire sites, scenic locations, as well as wilderness and rental huts. The national park area has a total of 340 kilometres of marked summer hiking trails. Approximately 200 kilometres of summer hiking trails are also located in the vicinity of the national park. With a few exceptions, mountain biking is permitted on marked summer hiking trails. There are over 500 kilometres of ski trails and more than 100 kilometres of winter hiking trails. You can walk, snowshoe and mountain bike on the winter hiking trails.

The Hetta-Pallas Trail is the best known hiking trail in the national park – and the oldest marked hiking trail in Finland. It was marked in 1934. The Hetta-Pallas Trail is approximately 50 kilometres long, and it can be hiked in either direction. The trail runs along the fell plateaus and descends into ravines. It also takes hikers to the tops of many fells. There are several serviced wilderness and rental huts along the route.

The trekking trails and services of Pallas-Yllästunturi National Park can be found on ExcursionMap.fi.

== Geography and nature ==
The landscape of Pallas-Yllästunturi National Park is dominated by a chain of fells, which is the remains of an ancient folded mountain range. Today's rounded fells are the worn-down bases of those mountains. The highest point in the national park is Taivaskero in the Pallastunturi Fells, which is 809 metres above sea level. Other high summits include Pyhäkero, Lumikero, Laukukero and Palkaskero. Kero is a Finnish word that refers to the round, treeless top of a fell.

The nature in Pallas-Yllästunturi National Park is diverse and varied. The area has several different habitats: mires, heath forests, old-growth forests in their natural state, open fells and herb-rich forests.

=== Vegetation and waterways ===
The national park is rich in vegetation. Scots pine, Norway spruce and fell birch do particularly well in the area. Typical plants in the treeless fell areas include various low-growing plants like dwarf birch, pincushion plants, Alpine bearberry and crowberry. The lush creekside groves are a good place to find plants like downy currant, ostrich fern, garden angelica and mezereon. In terms of dwarf shrubs, bilberry and cowberry thrive in the heath forests. Wood crane's-bill and dwarf cornel as well as many other rare species of moss and fungi grow in the moist old-growth forests.

In addition to fells and coniferous forests, mires are a typical landscape in Pallas-Yllästunturi National Park. Many wetland plants, such as Labrador tea, tussock cottongrass, cloudberry and bog bilberry, do well in mires. Rare orchids also grow in the calcareous areas.

The national park has many lakes, ponds and streams. The largest lake in the park is Pallasjärvi Lake, located southeast of the Pallastunturi Visitor Centre.

Large mammals found in the national park include reindeer and elk. During the summer, reindeer in particular spend a lot of time on the fells and in mire areas. Other mammals typically seen in the area are the mountain hare, red fox, weasel, Norway lemming, various species of vole and the red squirrel. Eurasian brown bear and northern lynx are two of Finland's large predators that live permanently in the Pallas-Yllästunturi National Park area.

Northern and southern bird species mix in Pallas-Yllästunturi National Park. Northern species include the rock ptarmigan, willow grouse and Eurasian dotterel. Lush spruce forests are a popular location for southern species like the common blackbird and wood warbler. Various tit species, Siberian jays and pine grosbeaks can be seen in the forest. Whenever there are a lot of voles, more owls and hawks can also be observed in the area. A typical inhabitant of streams is the white-throated dipper, which dives into running water to catch its food – also in the winter. Other bird species seen in the national park include the bluethroat, wood sandpiper, western yellow wagtail, ruff and spotted redshank.

=== Weather and natural phenomena ===
Pallas-Yllästunturi National Park's location north of the Arctic Circle means that it experiences the typical weather and natural phenomena associated with seasonal changes. Winter includes a polar night period in December–January, snowfall, freezing temperatures that can drop to -30 °C, and very little sunlight. On clear evenings and nights, planets, stars and the northern lights may be visible in the sky.

The snow cover in the national park is thickest in March–April, when there may be more than one metre of snow on the fells and in the forests. The amount of light increases rapidly in late winter. When spring arrives, the snow melts and the amount of light continues to increase. Summer begins in mid-June, and the midnight sun lights up the area in June–July. The sun doesn't set at all during this period.

The display of autumn colours usually begins in mid-September in Western Lapland and lasts for two to three weeks. The first snow generally falls sometime after mid-October, but snowdrifts can occasionally be seen during the summer months, especially in the area of the Pallas-Ounastunturi Fells.

Climate data for Laukukero (elevation 757 m (2,484 ft), 2007-2025 normals, extremes 1996–present)
Month	Jan	Feb	Mar	Apr	May	Jun	Jul	Aug	Sep	Oct	Nov	Dec	Year
Record high °C (°F)	1.6 (34.9)	3.2 (37.8)	11.1 (52.0)	14.8 (58.6)	27.7 (81.9)	26.8 (80.2)	27.2 (81.0)	25.3 (77.5)	19.4 (66.9)	12.7 (54.9)	11.4 (52.5)	2.5 (36.5)	27.7 (81.9)
Mean daily maximum °C (°F)	−8.6 (16.5)	−8.0 (17.6)	−6.7 (19.9)	−2.3 (27.9)	4.4 (39.9)	10.9 (51.6)	14.8 (58.6)	11.3 (52.3)	6.7 (44.1)	−0.7 (30.7)	−3.9 (25.0)	−5.3 (22.5)	1.1 (34.0)
Daily mean °C (°F)	−10.4 (13.3)	−9.7 (14.5)	−8.5 (16.7)	−4.3 (24.3)	1.5 (34.7)	7.0 (44.6)	11.7 (53.1)	8.7 (47.7)	4.6 (40.3)	−2.3 (27.9)	−5.6 (21.9)	−7.6 (18.3)	−1.3 (29.7)
Mean daily minimum °C (°F)	−12.2 (10.0)	−11.5 (11.3)	−10.3 (13.5)	−6.3 (20.7)	−1.3 (29.7)	3.5 (38.3)	8.5 (47.3)	6.1 (43.0)	2.4 (36.3)	−3.9 (25.0)	−7.4 (18.7)	−8.2 (17.2)	−3.4 (25.9)
Record low °C (°F)	−31.0 (−23.8)	−27.6 (−17.7)	−20.3 (−4.5)	−16.9 (1.6)	−12.9 (8.8)	−5.6 (21.9)	−1.2 (29.8)	−2.2 (28.0)	−6.0 (21.2)	−15.5 (4.1)	−21.0 (−5.8)	−23.4 (−10.1)	−31.0 (−23.8)
Source 1: Infoclimat.fr
Source 2: Kilotavu.com

Climate data for Sammaltunturi (elevation 566 m (1,857 ft), 2007-2025 normals, extremes 1996–present)
Month	Jan	Feb	Mar	Apr	May	Jun	Jul	Aug	Sep	Oct	Nov	Dec	Year
Record high °C (°F)	4.0 (39.2)	4.7 (40.5)	6.6 (43.9)	15.3 (59.5)	25.3 (77.5)	27.5 (81.5)	29.4 (84.9)	26.8 (80.2)	19.4 (66.9)	11.2 (52.2)	8.0 (46.4)	4.1 (39.4)	29.4 (84.9)
Mean daily maximum °C (°F)	−7.8 (18.0)	−7.0 (19.4)	−4.5 (23.9)	0.8 (33.4)	7.0 (44.6)	13.0 (55.4)	16.8 (62.2)	12.1 (53.8)	7.5 (45.5)	0.2 (32.4)	−3.2 (26.2)	−4.4 (24.1)	2.5 (36.5)
Daily mean °C (°F)	−10.2 (13.6)	−9.2 (15.4)	−7.0 (19.4)	−2.0 (28.4)	3.6 (38.5)	8.8 (47.8)	13.3 (55.9)	10.8 (51.4)	6.2 (43.2)	−1.4 (29.5)	−5.1 (22.8)	−7.0 (19.4)	0.1 (32.2)
Mean daily minimum °C (°F)	−12.6 (9.3)	−11.4 (11.5)	−9.4 (15.1)	−4.9 (23.2)	0.2 (32.4)	5.1 (41.2)	9.8 (49.6)	6.8 (44.2)	3.3 (37.9)	−2.7 (27.1)	−6.9 (19.6)	−8.0 (17.6)	−2.6 (27.3)
Record low °C (°F)	−33.5 (−28.3)	−29.5 (−21.1)	−20.9 (−5.6)	−16.6 (2.1)	−11.8 (10.8)	−3.9 (25.0)	−0.4 (31.3)	−1.3 (29.7)	−5.6 (21.9)	−16.1 (3.0)	−22.0 (−7.6)	−24.1 (−11.4)	−33.5 (−28.3)
Source 1: Infoclimat.fr
Source 2: Kilotavu.com

== Responsibility ==
Pallas-Yllästunturi National Park has been granted a European Charter 1 certificate for 2013–2018 and for 2019–2023. The certificates have been granted by the EUROPARC Federation.

All national parks in Finland follow the principles of litter-free hiking. The aim of litter-free hiking is to ensure that visitors carry their own trash out of the terrain and deliver it to the serviced recycling points. The purpose is to reduce the amount of waste that ends up in nature.

There are recycling points at the Pallastunturi, Fell Lapland and Yllästunturi Visitor Centres where paper, cardboard, glass and metal waste as well as batteries can be delivered. Biowaste can be composted in dry toilets, and small amounts of combustible waste can be burned at campfire sites.

Air purity in Pallas-Yllästunturi National Park is measured at the Finnish Meteorological Institute's Sammaltunturi weather station. According to the World Health Organisation (WHO), some of the cleanest air in the world is measured at Sammaltunturi weather station. Concentrations of fine particles in the area are less than 4 μg/m^{3}.

== Visitor centres ==
Pallas-Yllästunturi National Park has three visitor centres: Yllästunturi Visitor Centre Kellokas, Pallastunturi Visitor Centre and Fell Lapland Visitor Centre in Hetta. The customer service officers at the visitor centres provide information on the national park and hiking possibilities. The Meän Elämää (Our Life), From Forest to Fell Tops, and Vuovjjuš – Wanderers exhibitions present the nature and culture of the area. You can also watch films and see art exhibitions at the visitor centres. Visitors can also purchase nature-themed products.

== History ==
The idea of establishing national parks in Finland was first brought up in 1910. At that time, the management committee for protected forests published a report proposing the establishment of national parks at the Pallastunturi Fells and at Pyhätunturi Fell in Pelkosenniemi. Finnish botanist Kaarlo Linkola had a major role in the work to establish a national park in the Pallastunturi Fells area.

A proposal to designate the Pallas-Ounastunturi Fells a protected area was approved at the 1928 Parliamentary Days and, after many reports and proposals, Finland's first national parks were finally established in 1938. Pallas-Ounastunturi National Park was one of these first parks.

The history of tourism in Pallas-Yllästunturi National Park stretches back to the 1930s, when the first fell skiing courses were organised at Pyhäkero in the Ounastunturi Fells and at the Pallastunturi Fells. Tourism also increased in Äkäslompolo at the same time.

Pallas-Yllästunturi National Park was established in 2005. The new park combined the old Pallas-Ounastunturi National Park, Ylläs-Aakenus Nature Reserve and nearby areas from other conservation programmes, such as old-growth forests and areas that were part of wetland conservation programmes. Pallas-Ounastunturi National Park ceased to exist at the same time. The total area of the new national park was 1022 km^{2}.

The highest point of Yllästunturi Fell and the ski resorts located there are not part of the national park area, but the ski resort on Laukukero at Pallastunturi Fell is inside the park.

== Gallery ==
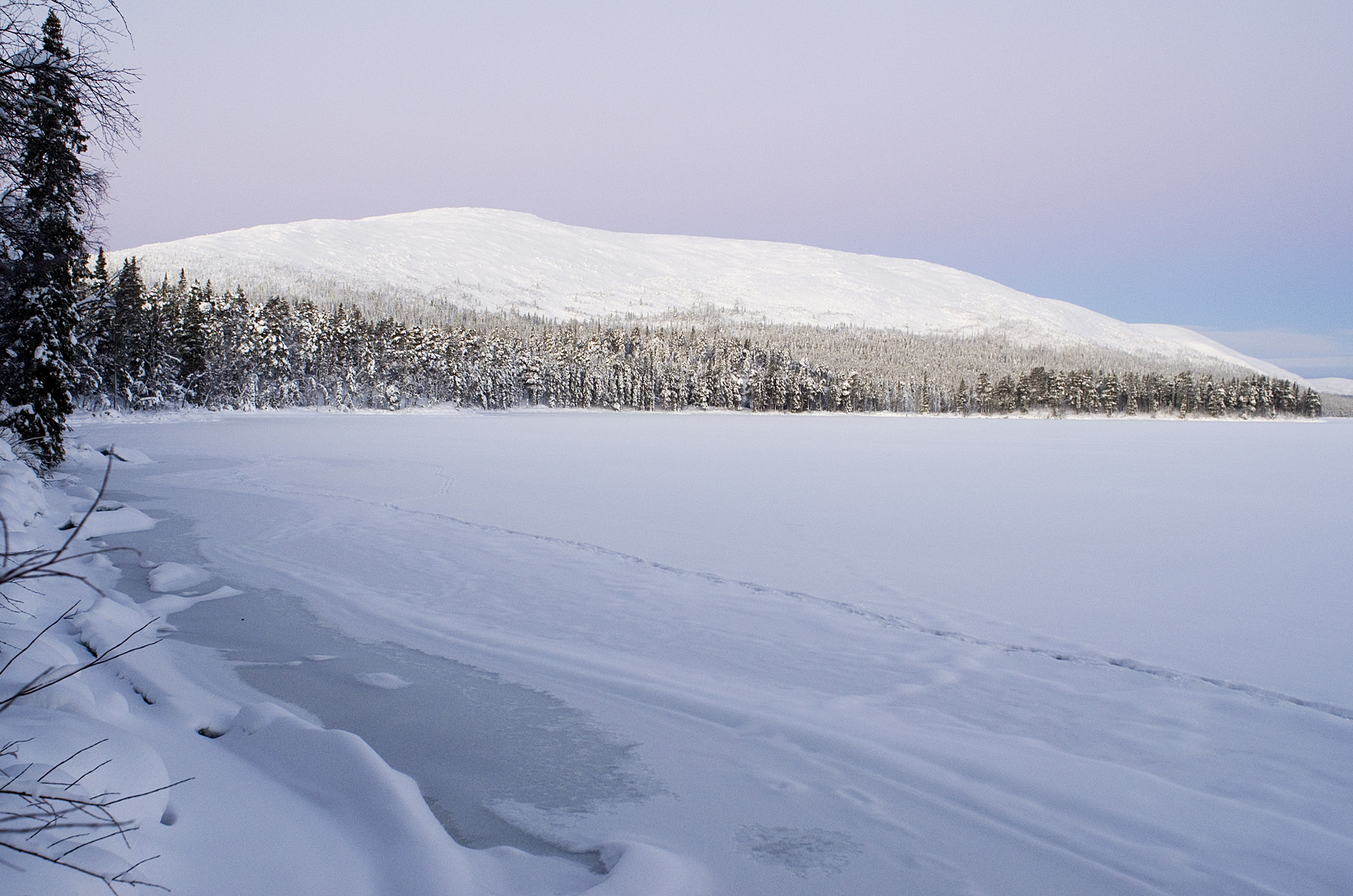
Frozen lake Pallasjärvi and Pallastunturi ridge

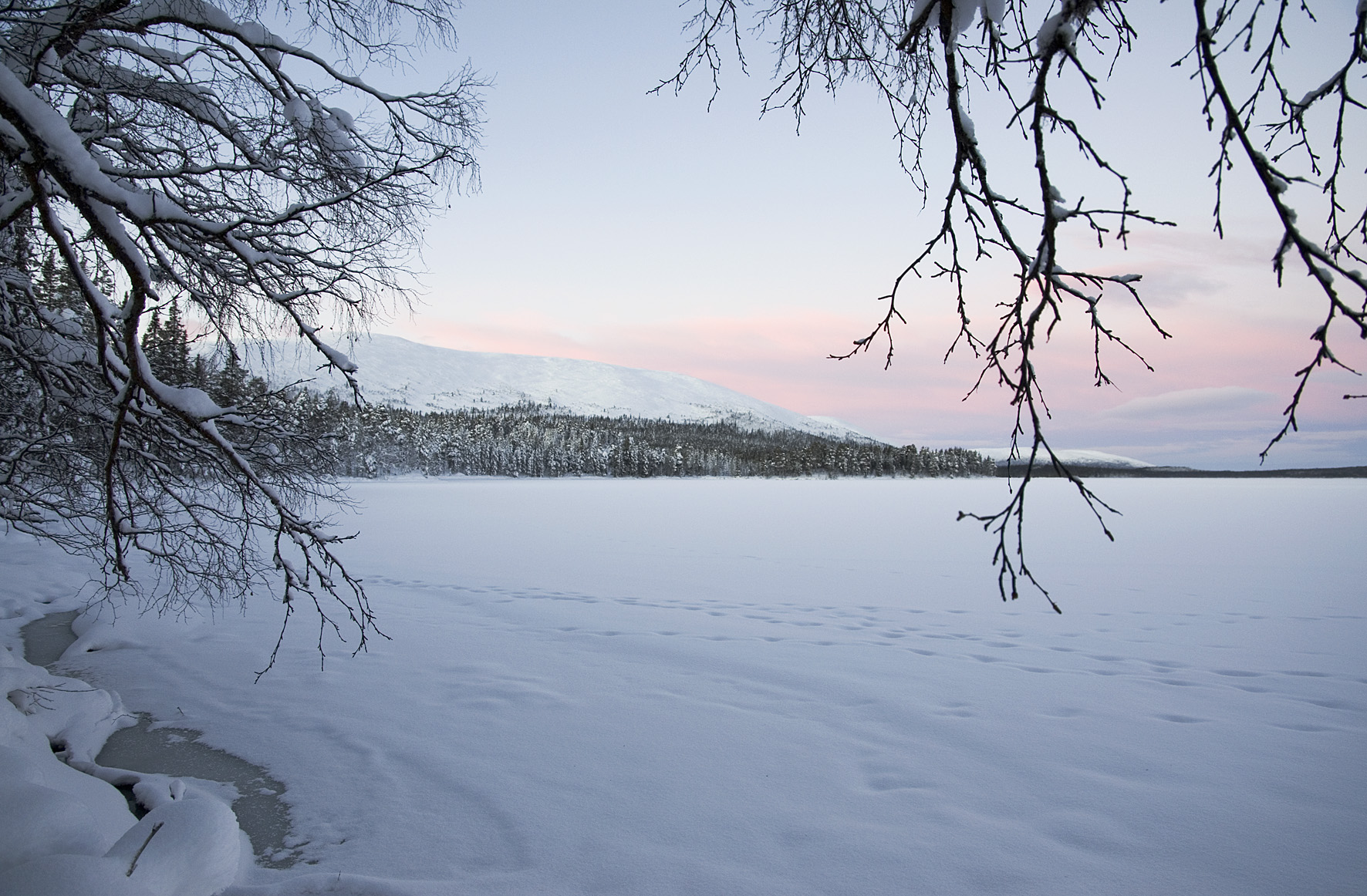
Frozen lake Pallasjärvi and Pallastunturi ridge

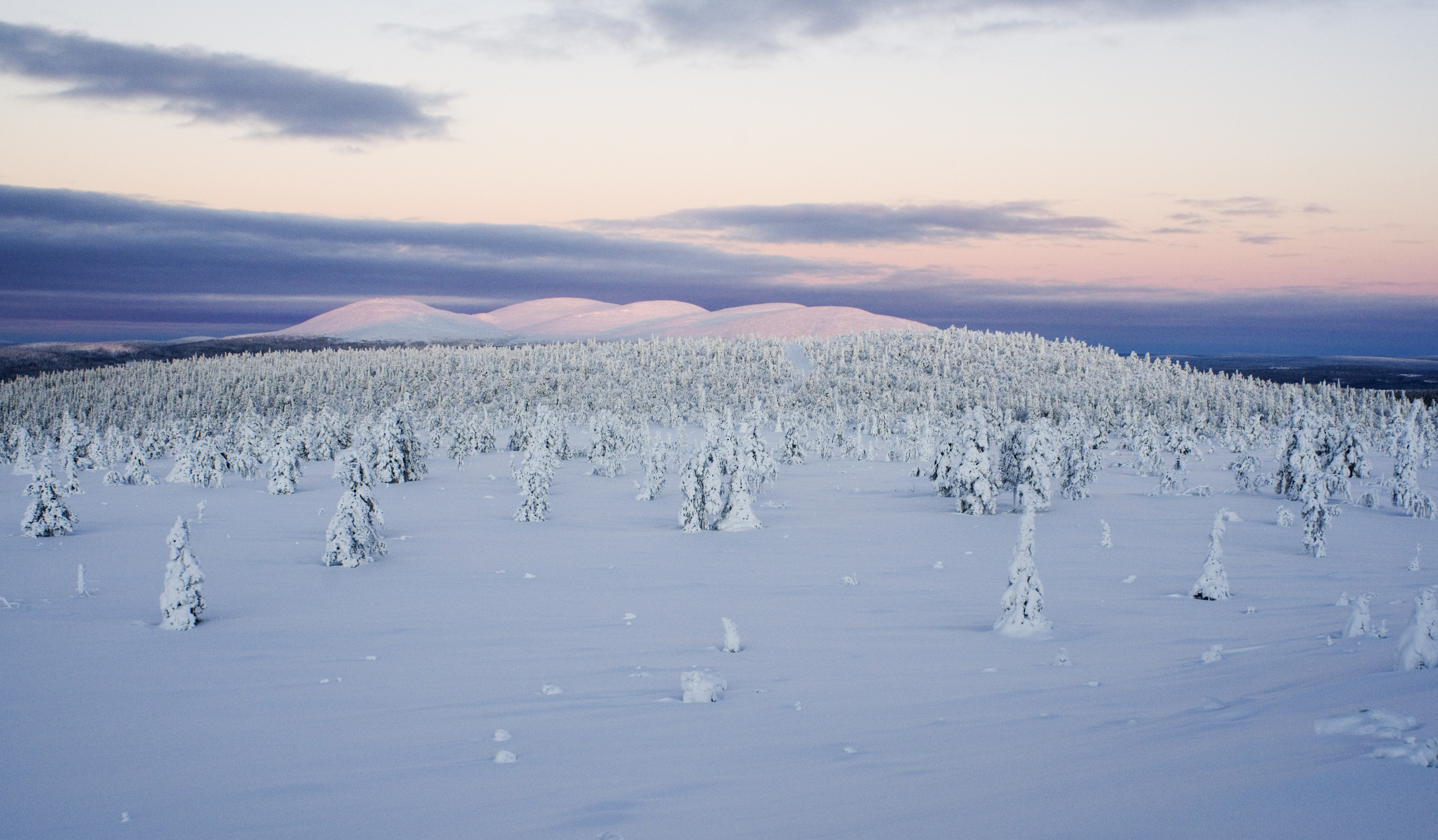
View on the ridge Pallastunturi from Sammaltunturi

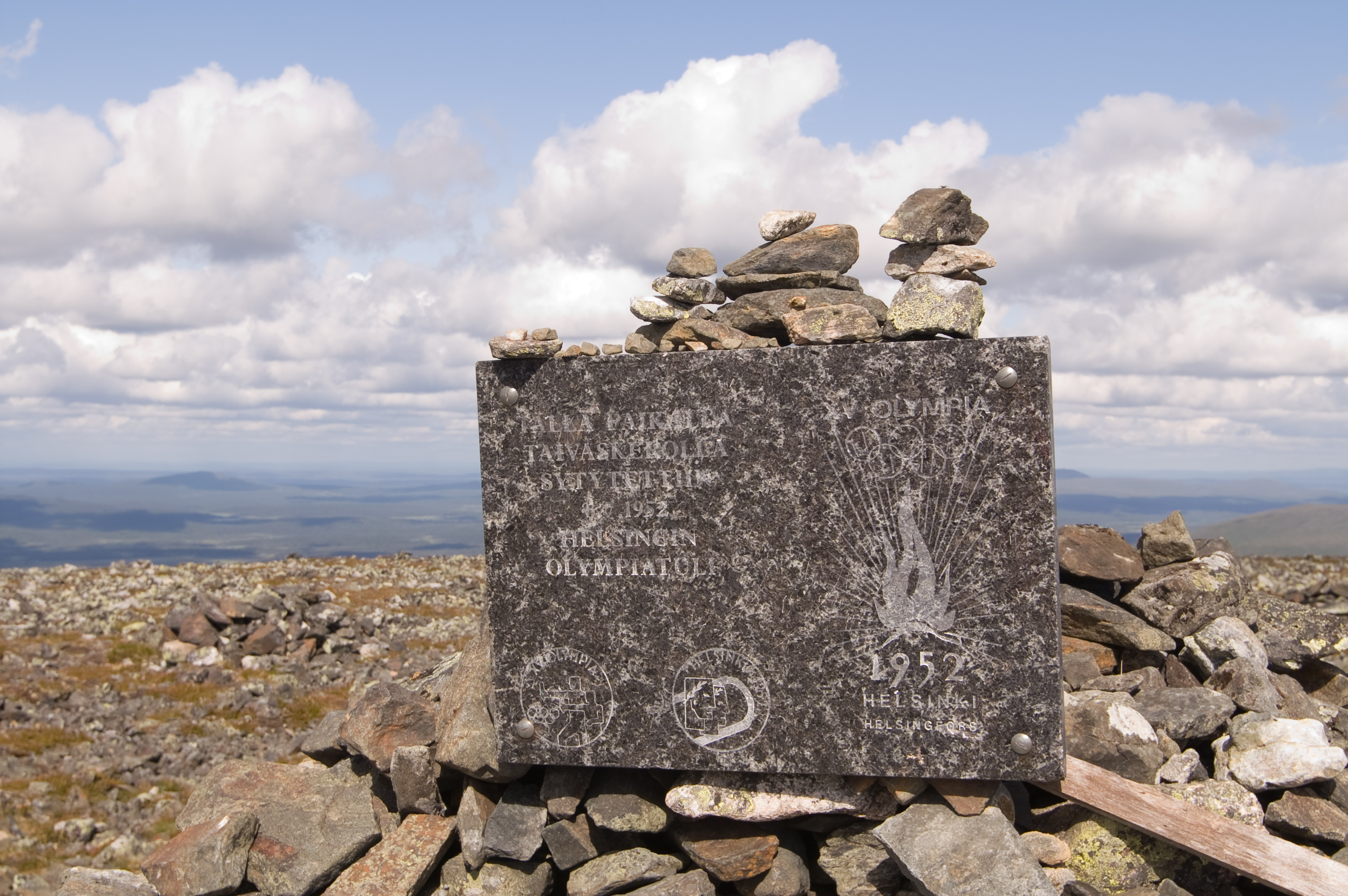
Top of Taivaskero

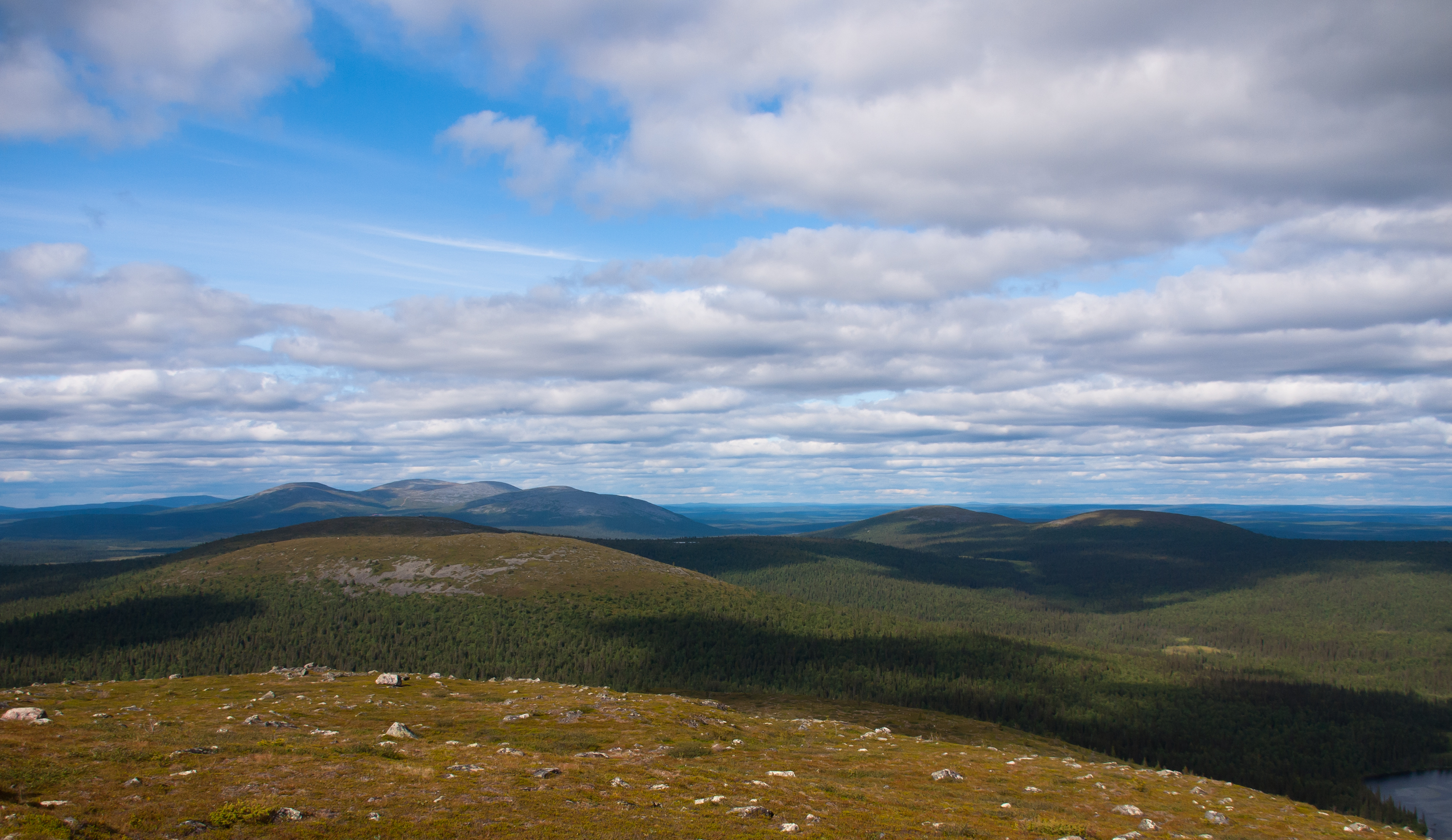
Sammal, Pallas and Lommol

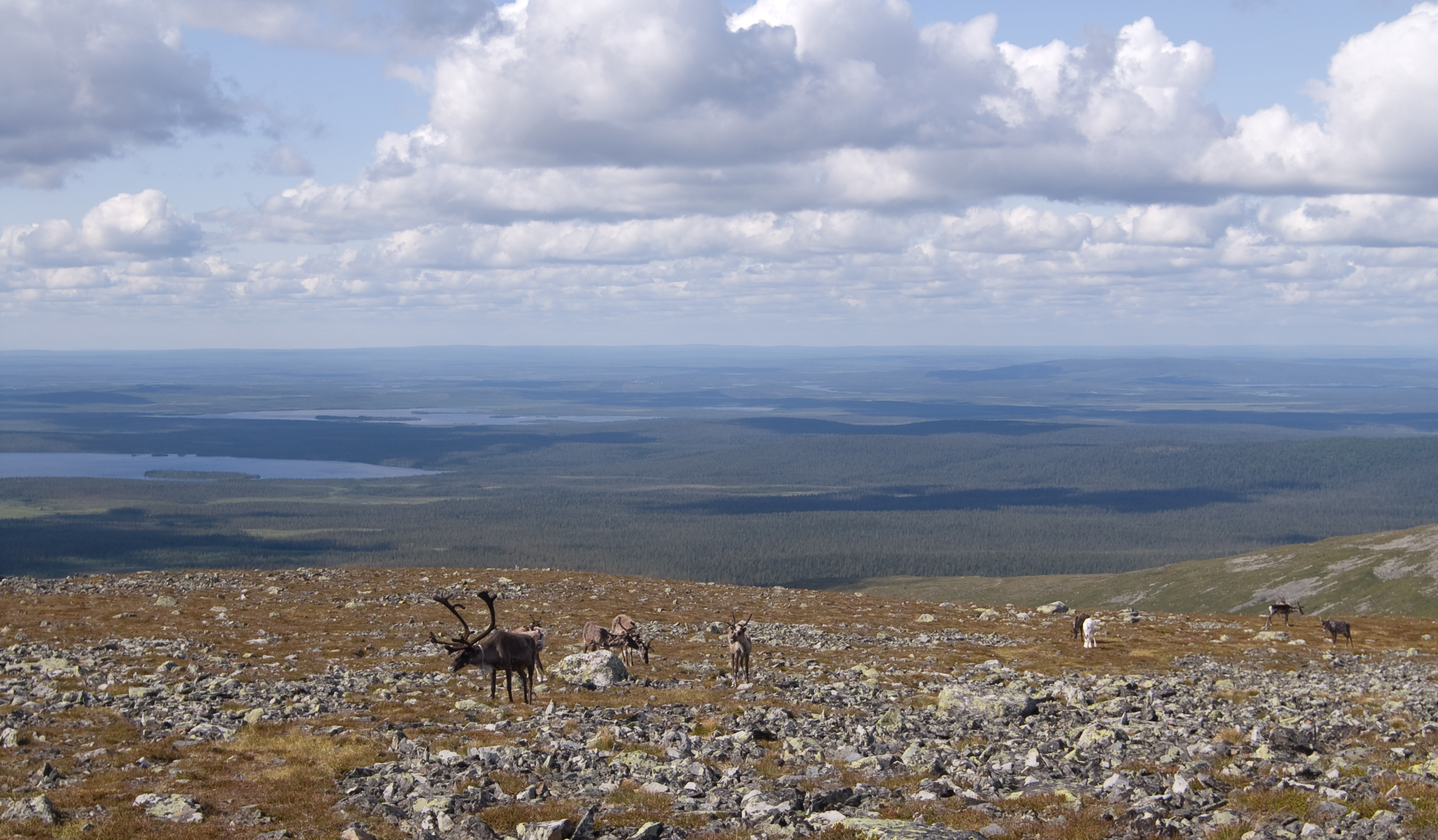
Reindeer on Taivaskeru

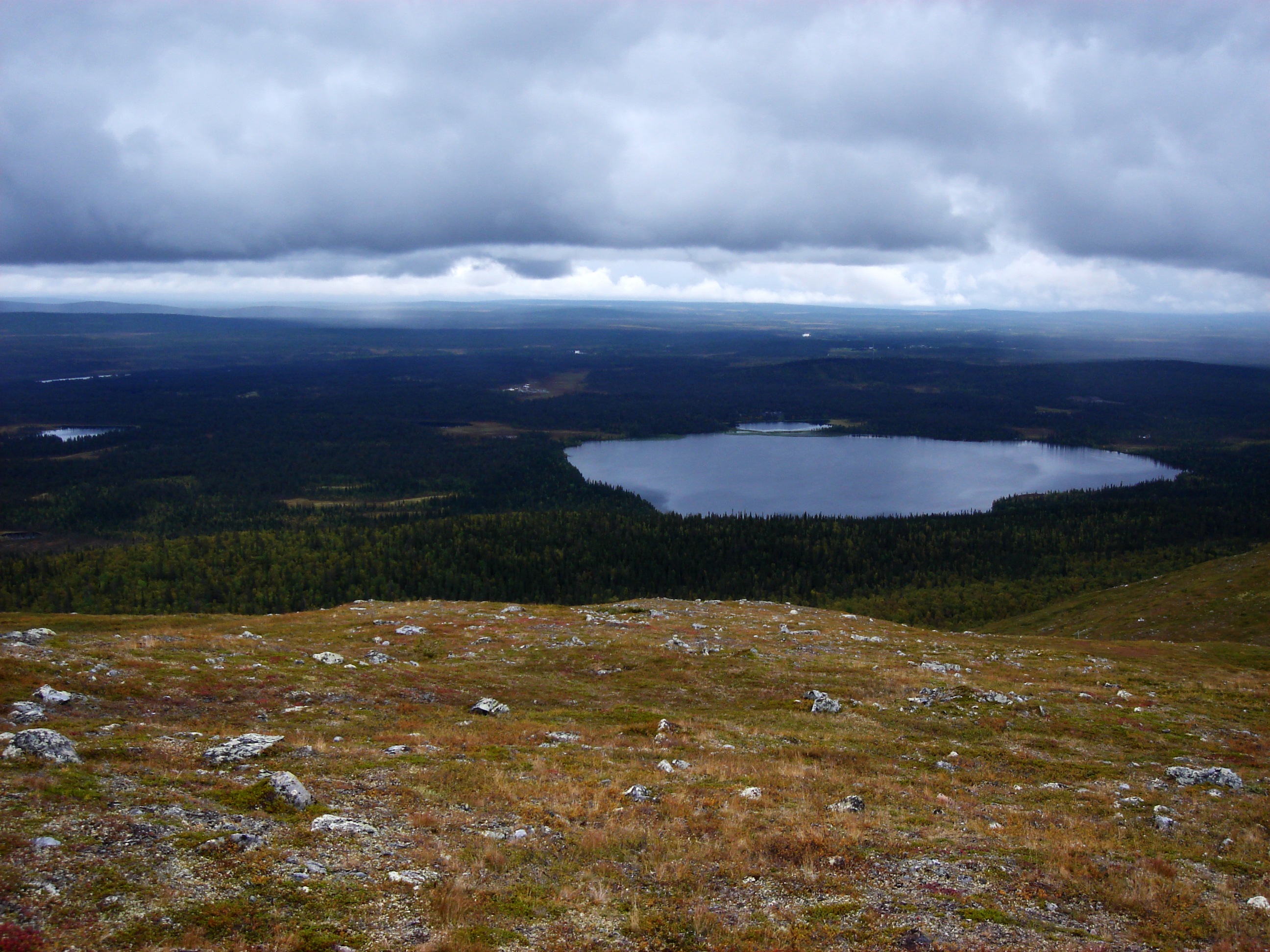
Lake Vuontisjärvi

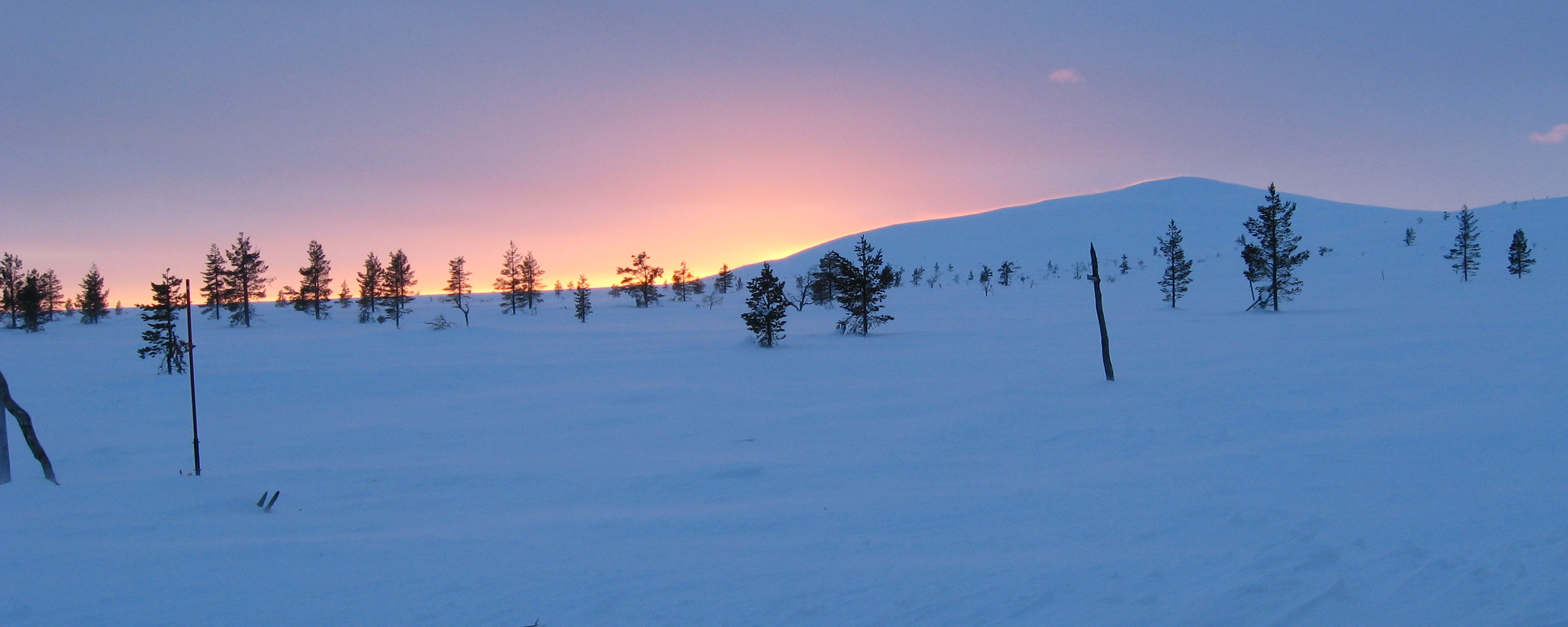
Outtakka (photo from Pahakuru hut)

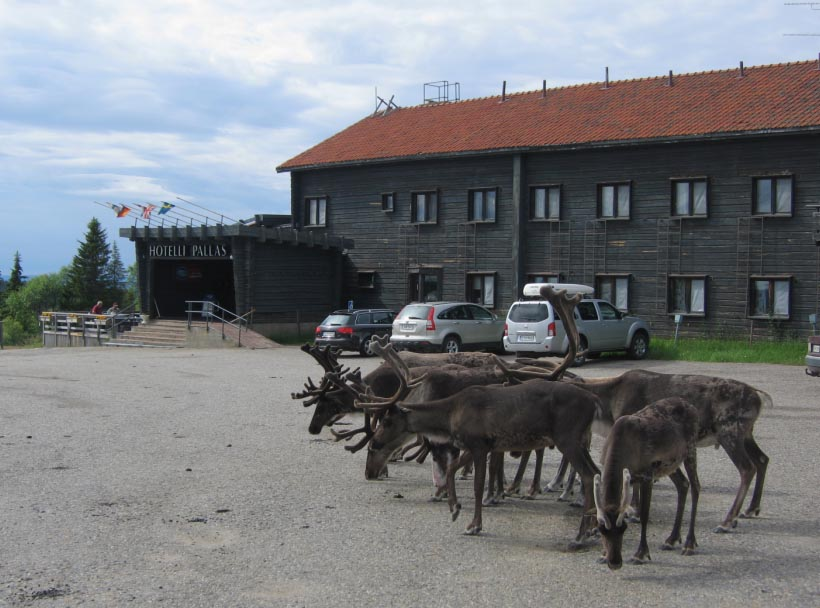
Hotel Pallas
