= Tarvantovaara Wilderness Area =

Wilderness area in Enontekiö, Finland

- IUCN category VI (protected area with sustainable use of natural resources)
- Location within Finland
- Location: Lapland, Finland
- Coordinates: 68°33′N 22°54′E
- Area: 670 km^{2} (260 sq mi)
- Established: 1991
- Governing body: Metsähallitus

Tarvantovaara Wilderness Area (Finnish: Tarvantovaaran erämaa) is a wilderness reserve in Enontekiö municipality, Lapland, Finland. It is governed by Metsähallitus and covers 670 square kilometres (260 mi^{2}). It was established in 1991 like all the other wilderness areas in Lapland.

== See also ==
- Wilderness areas of Finland
