= Hotel Pallas =

Hotel in Muonio, Finland

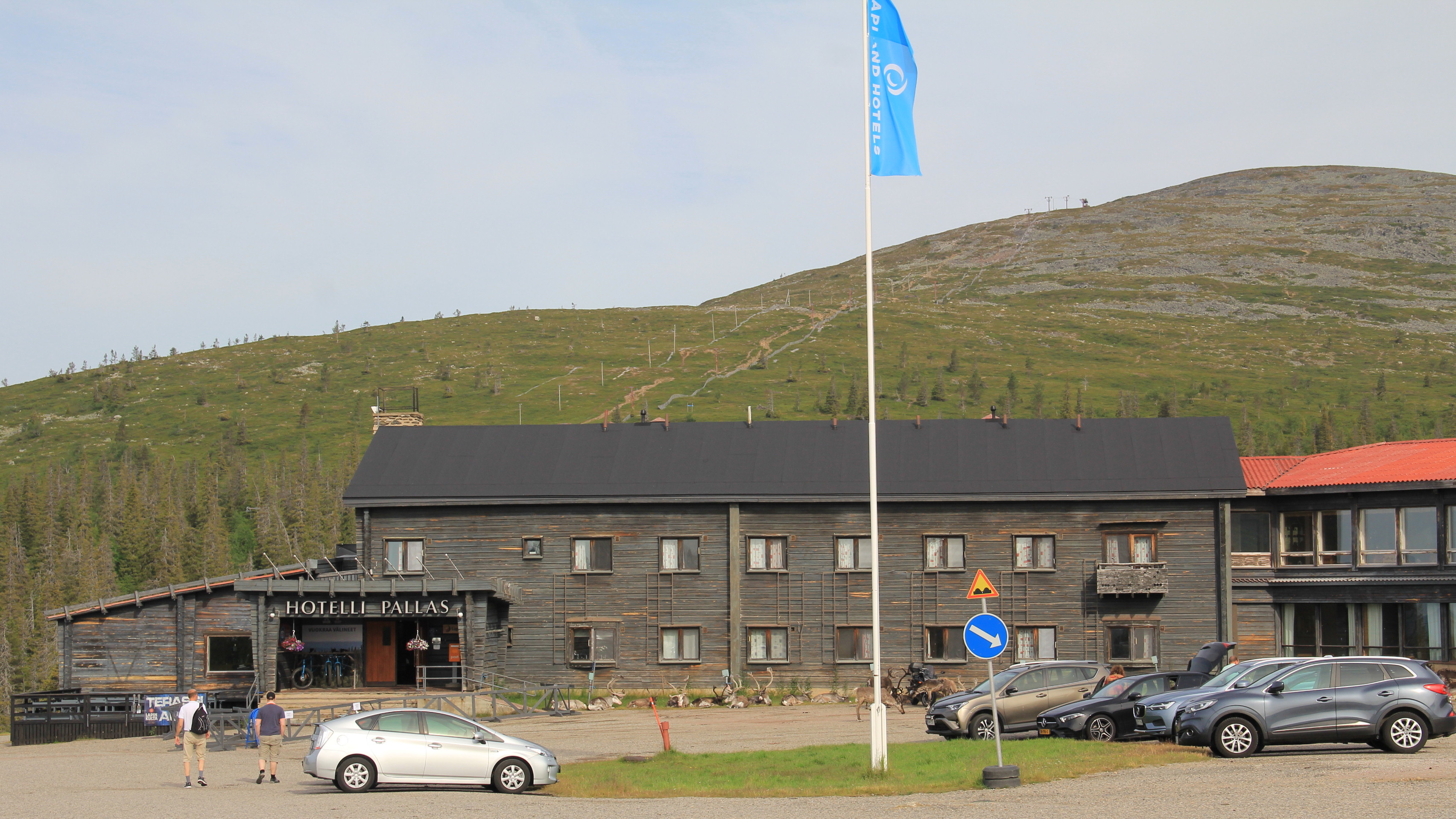
- Interactive map of the Hotel Pallas area
- Hotel chain: Lapland Hotels

General information
- Location: Muonio, Finland, Pallastunturintie 560, 99330 Pallas
- Coordinates: 68°02′47.46″N 24°03′43.80″E
- Opening: 7 March 1948; 78 years ago

Design and construction
- Architect: Jouko Ylihannu

Other information
- Number of rooms: 130
- Number of restaurants: 1

Website
- www.laplandhotels.com

Hotel Pallas is a wilderness hotel located in the Pallastunturi Ski Center in Muonio, Finland. The hotel was designed by architect Jouko Ylihannu and was opened in 1948.

The former functionalist style hotel designed by architects Väinö Vähäkallio and Aulis E. Hämäläinen, completed in 1938 and blown up by the Germans in October 1944 when they left Lapland during the Lapland War, was located about a kilometer from the site of the current hotel.

The log part of the building has features of the romanticism of the reconstruction period, although it has been considerably renovated. After a fire destroyed the kitchen, the hotel was closed during the winter season in 2006, but it was opened again in the summer of the same year.

The hotel is part of the private Lapland Hotels chain. Due to Lapland Hotels' wish, a law change is being prepared, after which it could build a hotel six times larger than before in the Pallas-Yllästunturi National Park. A civic movement was founded to oppose the project in 2008, but permission was granted for the hotel extension in 2009.

== See also ==
- List of Finnish hotels
