= Pöyrisjärvi Wilderness Area =

Wilderness area in Enontekiö, Finland

- IUCN category VI (protected area with sustainable use of natural resources)
- Location within Finland
- Location: Lapland, Finland
- Coordinates: 68°37′N 24°06′E
- Area: 1,280 km^{2} (490 sq mi)
- Established: 1991
- Governing body: Metsähallitus

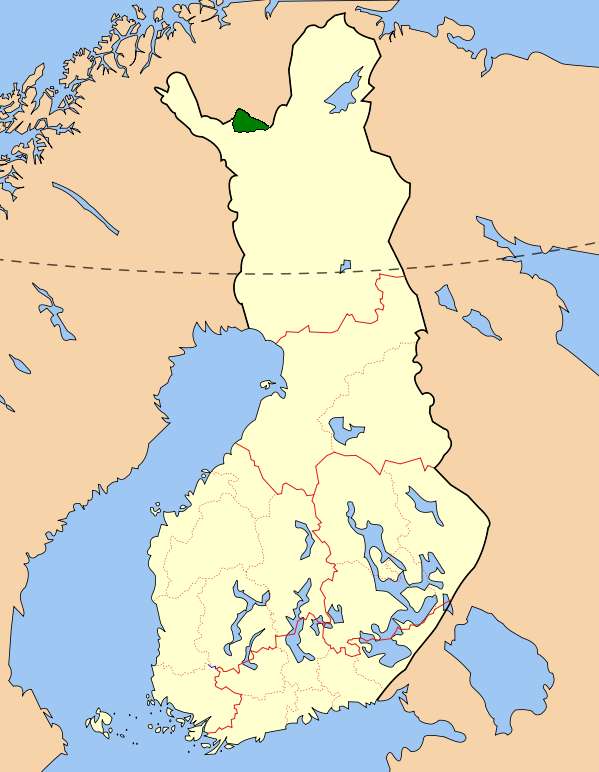
Pöyrisjärvi Wilderness Area location within Finland

Pöyrisjärvi Wilderness Area (Finnish: Pöyrisjärven erämaa) is a wilderness reserve in Enontekiö municipality, Lapland, Finland. It was established in 1991 like all the other wilderness reserves in Lapland and covers 1,280 square kilometres (490 mi^{2}).

== See also ==
- Wilderness areas of Finland
- Pöyrisjärvi
