= Paistunturi Wilderness Area =

Protected area in Finland

- IUCN category VI (protected area with sustainable use of natural resources)
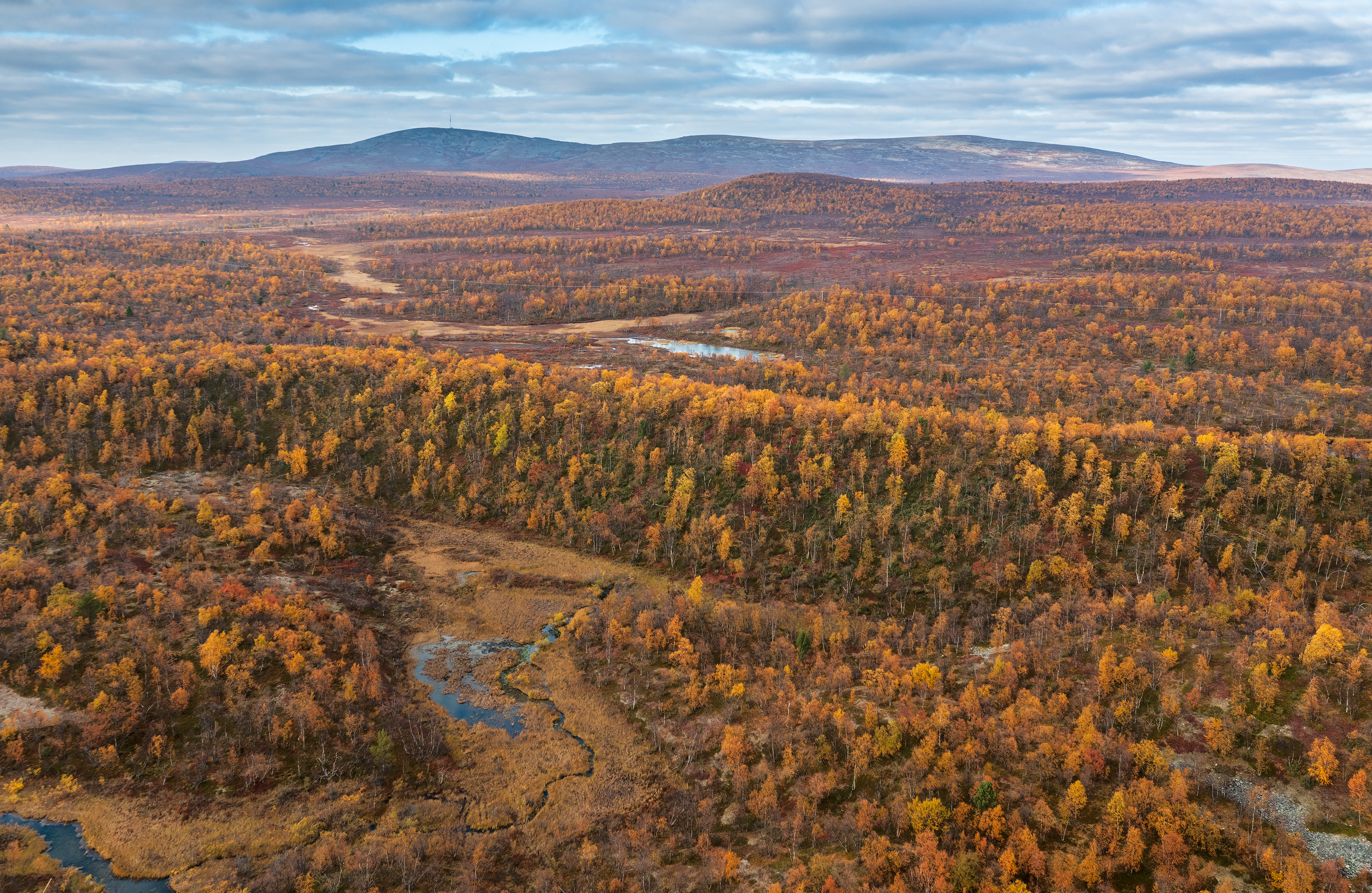
- Aerial view of Paistunturi Wilderness Area in Lapland, Finland.

- Location within Finland
- Location: Lapland, Finland
- Coordinates: 69°48′N 26°38′E
- Area: 1,570 km^{2} (610 sq mi)
- Established: 1991
- Governing body: Metsähallitus

Paistunturi Wilderness Area (Finnish: Paistunturin erämaa) is a wilderness reserve in Lapland, Finland. It is governed by Metsähallitus and covers 1,570 square kilometres (610 mi^{2}). It was established in 1991 like all the other wilderness areas in Lapland.

== See also ==
- Wilderness areas of Finland
