= Iltalypsy =

Finnish television series

Iltalypsy was a Finnish political satire television series that was produced by Yle and broadcast on Yle TV1 from 1 May 1993 to 7 April 2001.

The series featured genuine news videos featuring well-known Finnish politicians. Imitated voices of these politicians were added to these videos in order to "reveal" the secret thoughts of the politicians. Iltalypsy was initially hosted by genuine news anchors Riikka Uosukainen and Jorma Melleri. Later it featured fictional hosts Leila Toroskainen (Eeva Litmanen), Mika Wirta (Heikki Määttänen), Jaana Ala-Knaapi-Pesonen (Minna Suuronen), and Tero Saxman (Taisto Oksanen). The series also featured special reporter Aimo Surakka (Jorma Pilke), the Milkmaid (Liisa Rimpiläinen), sports reporter Pera Kartio (Jouko Klemettilä), and cultural reporter Diana Juva (Minna Koskela). The Milkmaid genuinely interviewed renowned politicians, like Tarja Halonen.

The series was popular during its run, gathering sometimes more than one million viewers. It also won a special mention in Telvis Awards in 1996. In 2001, Iltalypsy was succeeded by The Autocrats as the political satire of the Saturday evening.
