= Kaldoaivi Wilderness Area =

Wilderness area in Finnish Lapland

- IUCN category Ib (wilderness area)
- Location within Finland
- Location: Lapland, Finland
- Coordinates: 69°42′N 28°04′E
- Area: 2,924 km^{2} (1,129 sq mi)
- Established: 1991
- Governing body: Metsähallitus

The Kaldoaivi Wilderness Area (Finnish: Kaldoaivin erämaa; Northern Sami: Gálddoaivvi meahcceguovlu) is the largest wilderness reserve in Finland, located in the municipalities of Utsjoki and Inari in Lapland. It was established in 1991 like all the other 11 wilderness areas in Lapland. Its area is 2,924 square kilometres (1,129 mi^{2}). The large area of roadless wilderness continues outside the borders of Finland and the official area to Norway. It is governed by the Metsähallitus.

== Gallery ==
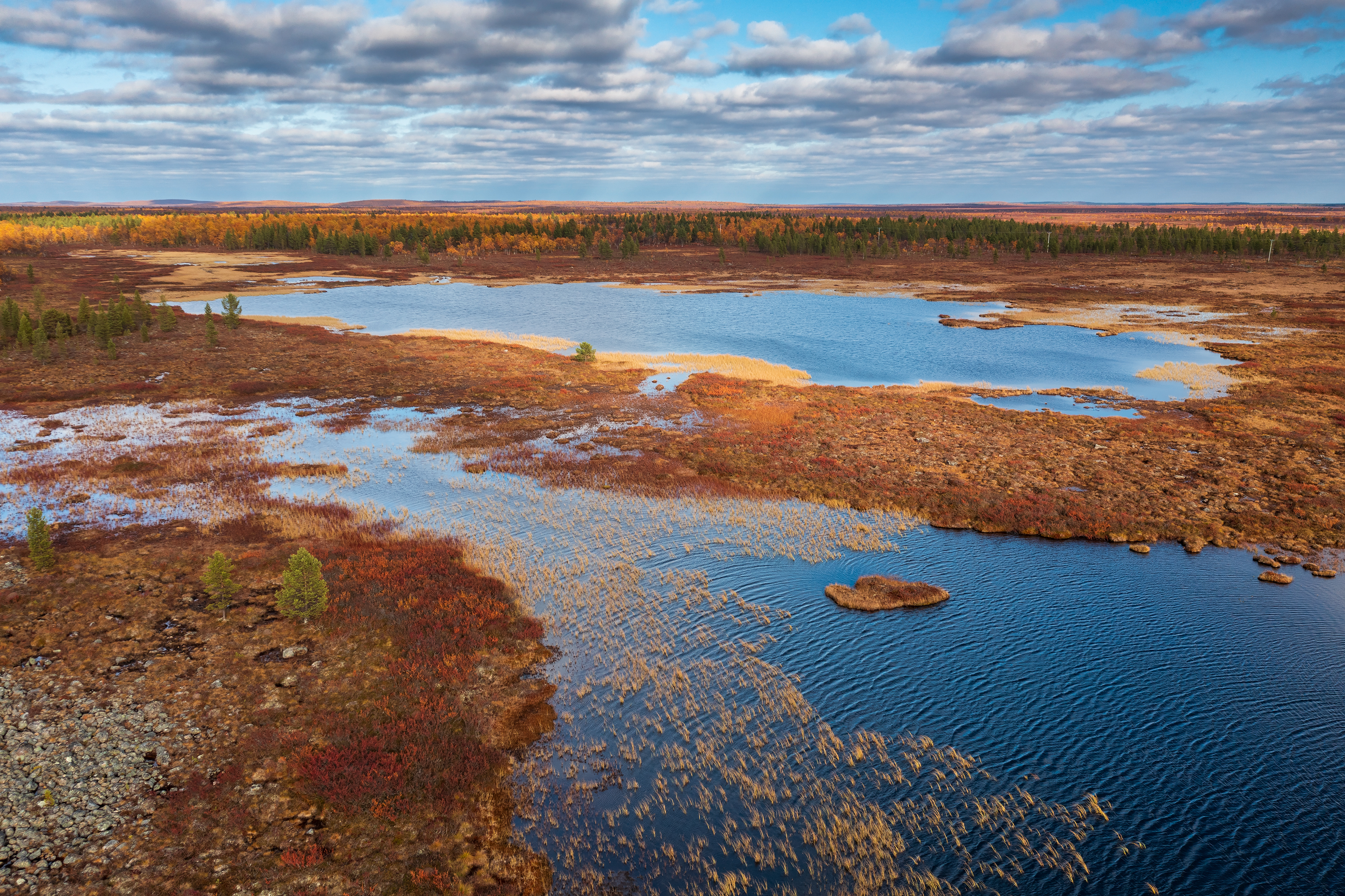
An autumn view over the Laavurenkaanlammet ponds in Sammuttijänkä–Vaijoenjänkä mire reserve

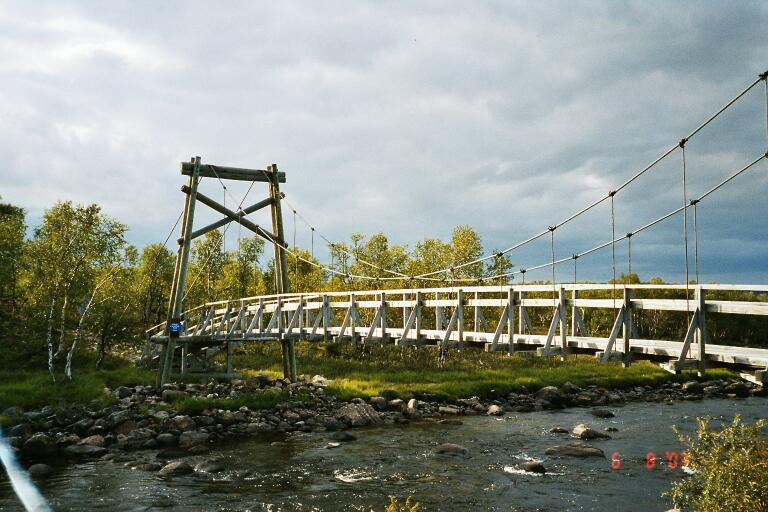
Suspension bridge crossing the Näätämöjoki river
