= Pulju Wilderness Area =

Wilderness area in Enontekiö and Kittilä, Finland

- IUCN category VI (protected area with sustainable use of natural resources)
- Location within Finland
- Location: Lapland, Finland
- Coordinates: 68°18′N 24°43′E
- Area: 614 km^{2} (237 sq mi)
- Established: 1991
- Governing body: Metsähallitus

Pulju Wilderness Area (Finnish: Puljun erämaa) is a wilderness reserve in the municipalities of Enontekiö and Kittilä in Lapland, Finland. It is governed by Metsähallitus and covers 614 square kilometres (237 mi^{2}). It was established in 1991 like all the other wilderness areas in Lapland.

The Pulju area is especially known for its peculiar landscape forms from (probably) the latest ice age: worm-like winding Pulju moraines. They are situated about 7 kilometres (4.3 mi) north from the Pulju village.

== See also ==
- Pulju moraine
- Wilderness areas of Finland
