= Käsivarsi Wilderness Area =

Protected area in Finland

- IUCN category Ib (wilderness area)
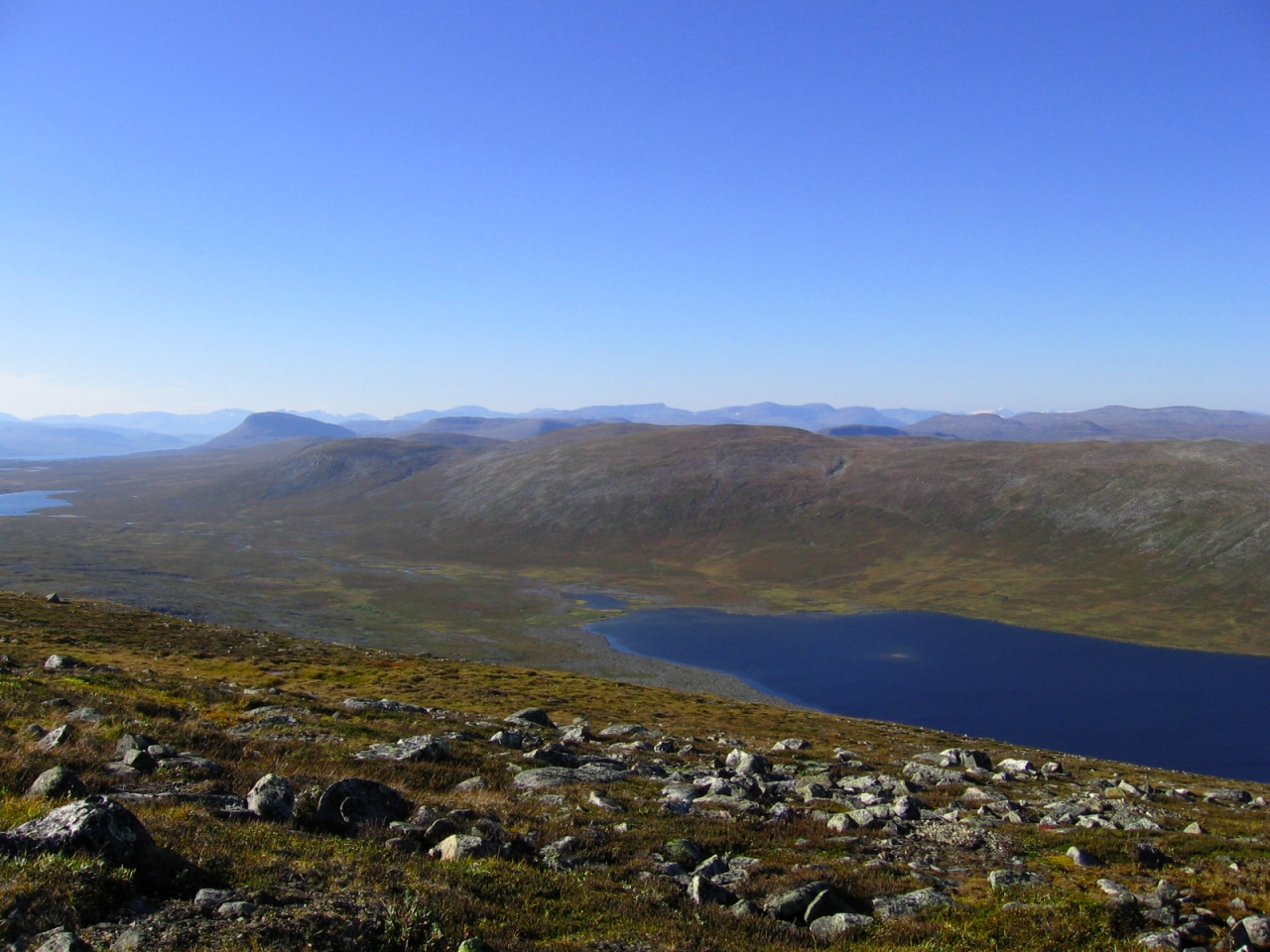
- A view from Termisvaara fell

- Location within Finland
- Location: Lapland, Finland
- Coordinates: 68°18′20″N 22°34′04″E
- Area: 2,206 km^{2} (852 sq mi)

The Käsivarsi Wilderness Area (Finnish: Käsivarren erämaa-alue; Northern Sami: Giehtaruohttasa meahcceguovlu) is the second-largest wilderness reserve in Finland. It was established in 1991 like all the other 11 wilderness areas in Lapland. Its area is 2,206 square kilometres (852 mi^{2}). It is the most popular wilderness area in Finland, by number of visitors. It is governed by Parks & Wildlife Finland (the Metsähallitus).

All Finnish fells of over 1,000 meters of height, except for nearby Saana, are situated in the Käsivarsi Wilderness Area.

Finland's highest peak Halti, about 1324 masl, is located in northern part of area. Kilpisjärvi-Halti hiking route is 55km long. 800km long Nordkalottleden Trail also goes through the area. Also marked path goes up to Saana. Kilpisjärvi Visitor Centre provides information about the area and routes.

Käsivarsi, the Finnish word for arm, refers to the location of the area—in the raised arm of the Maiden of Finland.

It is adjacent to Reisa National Park in Norway.
