= Muonio =

Muonio Muonio (Finnish) Muoná (Northern Sami)
- Municipality
- Muonion kunta (Finnish); Muonio kommun (Swedish)
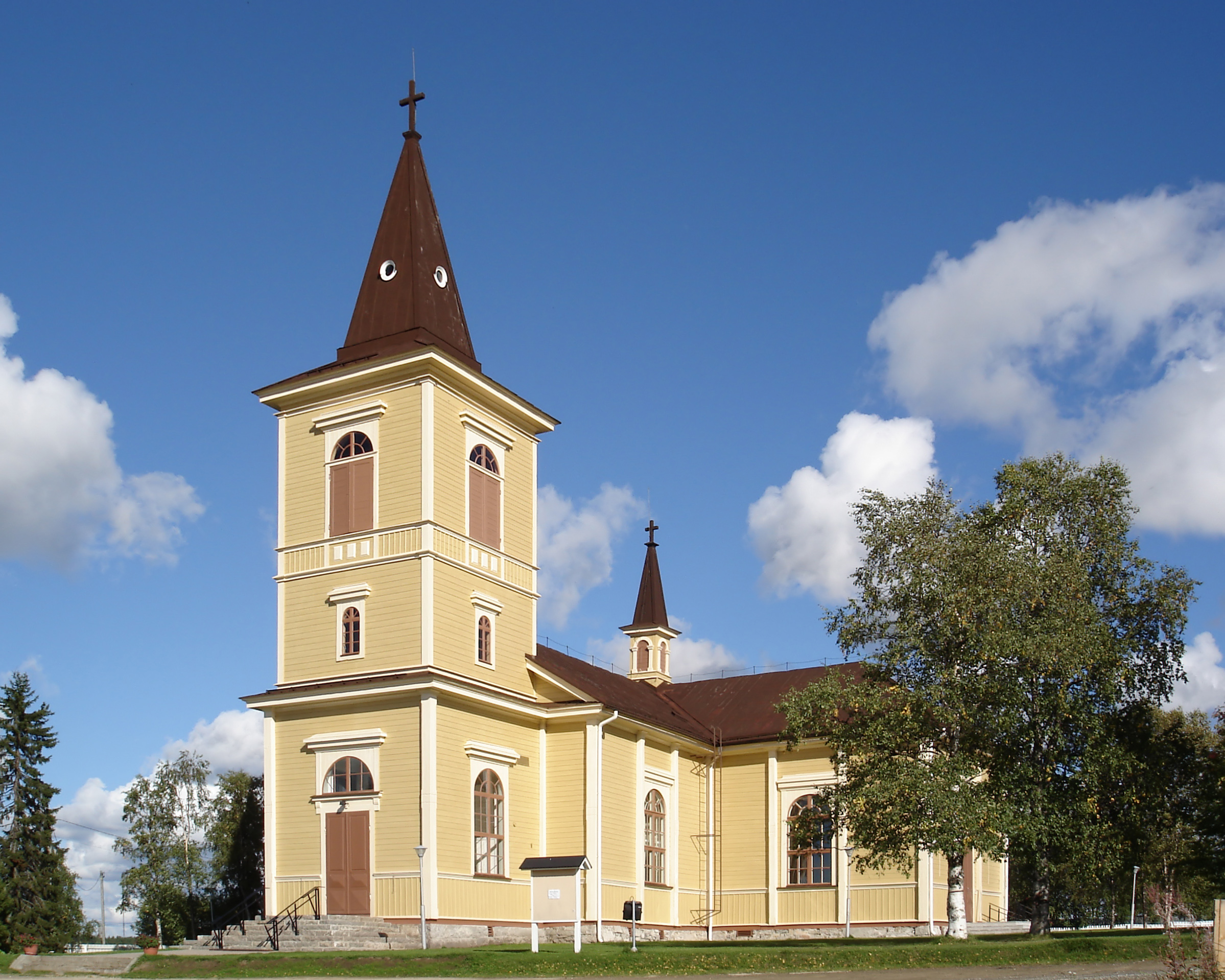
- Muonio Church

- Coat of arms

- Location of Muonio in Finland
- OpenStreetMap Interactive map outlining Muonio.
- Interactive map of Muonio
- Coordinates: 67°57.5′N 023°41′E
- Country: Finland
- Region: Lapland
- Sub-region: Fell Lapland
- Charter: 1868

Government
  - Municipal manager: Laura Enbuska-Mäki

Area (2018-01-01)
  - Total: 2,039.97 km^{2} (787.64 sq mi)
  - Land: 1,904.05 km^{2} (735.16 sq mi)
  - Water: 133.91 km^{2} (51.70 sq mi)
  - Rank: 31st largest in Finland

Population (2025-12-31)
  - Total: 2,323
  - Rank: 243rd largest in Finland
  - Density: 1.22/km^{2} (3.2/sq mi)

Population by native language
  - Finnish: 95% (official)
  - Swedish: 0.6%
  - Sami: 0.6%
  - Others: 3.8%

Population by age
  - 0 to 14: 14.9%
  - 15 to 64: 56.7%
  - 65 or older: 28.3%
- Time zone: UTC+02:00 (EET)
  - Summer (DST): UTC+03:00 (EEST)
- Website: www.muonio.fi

Muonio (previously called Muonionniska; Northern Sami: Muoná) is a municipality of Finland. The town is located in fell-region of far northern Finland above the Arctic Circle on the country's western border with Sweden, the Muonio River. It lies within the area of the former Lappi (Lapland) province in the Fell Lapland subregion. The next closest Finnish municipalities are Enontekiö to the north, Kittilä on the east, and Kolari to the south. Southwest of the town, a road bridge crosses the Muonio River, across the river, in Sweden, lies the nearby hamlet of Muoniovaara ("Muonio hill") in northern Pajala Municipality in Norrbotten County.

The area has been occupied by humans for at least 10,000 years; their arrival is thought to have coincided with deglaciation at the end of the Younger Dryas. They likely arrived from the south or east, since the Scandinavian Mountains rise 2,100 metres on the west, and over 1,300 metres to the north - both form a significant barrier to migration. Remains of eight dwellings from the Middle Stone Age have been excavated on the shore of Lake Akajarvi (fifteen miles from the center of the present-day village).

Prior to the historical period (c.1500 AD) archeological findings in the area are consistent with those known to be of Sámi peoples. Muonio (then called Muonionniska) first appears in written records in the mid-1500s in records of fishing-rights claims and disputes between Sámi indigenes and Finnish pioneer-hunters and fishermen.

The municipality today has a population of 2,323 (31 December 2025) and covers an area of 2,039.97 square kilometres (787.64 sq mi) of which 133.91 km^{2} (51.70 sq mi) is water. The population density is 1.22 inhabitants per square kilometre (3.2/sq mi). The municipality is unilingually Finnish, unlike many towns on the Finland–Sweden border.

Muonio is known as the municipality with the longest snow season in Finland. For that reason its vocational college has a top ski class that attracts aspiring cross-country ski champions from all over Finland. The "midnight sun" is above the horizon from 27 May to 17 July (52 days), and the period with continuous daylight is during this time. The period of continuous night, polar night, lasts from 10 December to 2 January (24 days).

The nearest airport to Muonio is Kittilä Airport, located 74 km (46 mi) south east of the town. Rovaniemi Airport, which is located 233 km (145 mi) south east of Muonio, is also at a reasonable distance.

== Villages ==
The villages in Muonio include:

- Ylimuonio
- Kangosjärvi
- Kätkäsuvanto
- Kihlanki
- Särkijärvi

== Politics ==
Results of the 2023 Finnish parliamentary election in Muonio:

- Finns Party 23.1%
- Centre Party 21.3%
- Social Democratic Party 19.9%
- National Coalition Party 18.7%
- Left Alliance 6.5%
- Green League 4.4%
- Christian Democrats 1.8%
- Other parties 4.3%

== Climate ==
Climate data for Muonio (1991-2020 normals, extremes 1959-10/2013 in Alamuonio, 10/2013-present in Oustajärvi)
| Month | Jan | Feb | Mar | Apr | May | Jun | Jul | Aug | Sep | Oct | Nov | Dec | Year |
|---|---|---|---|---|---|---|---|---|---|---|---|---|---|
| Record high °C (°F) | 6.7 (44.1) | 7.1 (44.8) | 10.0 (50.0) | 16.9 (62.4) | 28.4 (83.1) | 30.5 (86.9) | 30.8 (87.4) | 29.3 (84.7) | 22.4 (72.3) | 14.3 (57.7) | 9.2 (48.6) | 6.2 (43.2) | 30.8 (87.4) |
| Mean maximum °C (°F) | 0.9 (33.6) | 1.7 (35.1) | 5.4 (41.7) | 10.7 (51.3) | 20.1 (68.2) | 24.4 (75.9) | 25.6 (78.1) | 23.8 (74.8) | 17.5 (63.5) | 9.4 (48.9) | 2.7 (36.9) | 2.2 (36.0) | 27.0 (80.6) |
| Mean daily maximum °C (°F) | −9.0 (15.8) | −8.5 (16.7) | −2.4 (27.7) | 3.5 (38.3) | 9.9 (49.8) | 16.0 (60.8) | 19.2 (66.6) | 16.6 (61.9) | 10.5 (50.9) | 2.1 (35.8) | −4.1 (24.6) | −6.9 (19.6) | 3.9 (39.0) |
| Daily mean °C (°F) | −13.7 (7.3) | −13.2 (8.2) | −7.8 (18.0) | −1.4 (29.5) | 5.1 (41.2) | 11.2 (52.2) | 14.3 (57.7) | 11.8 (53.2) | 6.4 (43.5) | −1.0 (30.2) | −7.4 (18.7) | −11.1 (12.0) | −0.6 (31.0) |
| Mean daily minimum °C (°F) | −18.1 (−0.6) | −17.5 (0.5) | −13.1 (8.4) | −6.3 (20.7) | 0.4 (32.7) | 6.5 (43.7) | 9.7 (49.5) | 7.3 (45.1) | 2.7 (36.9) | −4.0 (24.8) | −10.9 (12.4) | −15.3 (4.5) | −4.9 (23.2) |
| Mean minimum °C (°F) | −33.9 (−29.0) | −32.8 (−27.0) | −28.1 (−18.6) | −19.3 (−2.7) | −6.7 (19.9) | 0.3 (32.5) | 3.4 (38.1) | −1.1 (30.0) | −5.3 (22.5) | −16.8 (1.8) | −25.1 (−13.2) | −29.9 (−21.8) | −36.2 (−33.2) |
| Record low °C (°F) | −46.2 (−51.2) | −45.1 (−49.2) | −40.8 (−41.4) | −31.2 (−24.2) | −18.3 (−0.9) | −3.7 (25.3) | −1.4 (29.5) | −5.7 (21.7) | −14.0 (6.8) | −28.1 (−18.6) | −36.4 (−33.5) | −41.9 (−43.4) | −46.2 (−51.2) |
| Average precipitation mm (inches) | 32 (1.3) | 27 (1.1) | 26 (1.0) | 28 (1.1) | 41 (1.6) | 66 (2.6) | 75 (3.0) | 69 (2.7) | 50 (2.0) | 43 (1.7) | 39 (1.5) | 35 (1.4) | 532 (20.9) |
| Average precipitation days (≥ 1.0 mm) | 9 | 9 | 7 | 7 | 8 | 11 | 12 | 11 | 9 | 9 | 10 | 11 | 113 |
| Average relative humidity (%) (daily average) | 85 | 84 | 78 | 72 | 66 | 65 | 71 | 78 | 83 | 89 | 90 | 87 | 79 |
Source 1: FMI
Source 2: Record highs and lows 1959- present

== See also ==
- Hotel Pallas – Hotel in Muonio, Finland
- Pallas-Yllästunturi National Park – National park in Lapland region, Finland
