= Lehtinen =

Lehtinen is a Finnish surname of Virtanen type derived from the word lehti, "leaf". Notable people with the surname include:

- Alex Lehtinen (born 1996), Finnish footballer
- Arja Lehtinen (born 1936), Finnish gymnast
- Artturi Lehtinen (1896–1966), Finnish diplomat
- Dexter Lehtinen (born 1946), American attorney and law professor
- Eino Lehtinen (1900–2007), Finnish centenarian, one of the last surviving veterans of the Finnish Civil War
- Emu Lehtinen (1947–2017), Finnish record dealer
- Felix Lehtinen (born 2003), Finnish soccer player
- Hanna Lehtinen (born 1958), Finnish diplomat
- Helena Lehtinen (born 1952), Finnish jeweller
- Ileana Ros-Lehtinen (born 1952), American politician
- Inkeri Lehtinen (1908–1997), Finnish politician
- Isaiah Lehtinen (born 1998), Canadian actor and musician
- J. K. Lehtinen (1883–1937), Finnish journalist and politician
- Jani Lehtinen (born 1974), Finnish racewalker
- Jarmo Lehtinen (born 1969), Finnish rally co-driver
- Jarmo Lehtinen (commentator), Finnish sports commentator and journalist
- Jere Lehtinen (born 1973), Finnish professional ice hockey forward
- Joel Lehtinen (born 1991), Finnish ice hockey player
- Johanna Lehtinen (born 1979), Finnish athlete
- Jutta Lehtinen (born 1983), Finnish actress
- Kai Lehtinen (born 1958), Finnish actor
- Kalle Lehtinen (born 1968), Finnish footballer
- Lasse Lehtinen (born 1947), Finnish politician
- Lauri Lehtinen (1908–1973), Finnish athlete
- Lauri Lehtinen (footballer) (1927–2016), Finnish footballer
- Lauri Lehtinen (sailor) (born 1987), Finnish sailor
- Maria Lehtinen, neuroscientist and neurobiologist
- Matti Lehtinen (1922–2022), Finnish operatic baritone
- Mika Lehtinen (born 1975), Finnish professional ice hockey defenceman
- Olli Lehtinen (1915–1992), Finnish boxer
- Oskari Lehtinen (born 1994), Finnish ice hockey player
- Pekka T. Lehtinen, Finnish arachnologist
- Petteri Lehtinen (born 1973), Finnish medley swimmer
- PV Lehtinen (born 1969), Finnish film director, screenwriter and producer
- Raimo Lehtinen (born 1946), Finnish cross-country skier
- Rauno Lehtinen (1932–2006), Finnish conductor and composer
- Rene Lehtinen (born 1985), Finnish motorcycle speedway rider
- Rodrigo Lehtinen (born 1986), American LGBTQ rights advocate
- Sandra Lehtinen (1859–1954), Finnish politician
- Silja Lehtinen (born 1985), Finnish sailor
- Susanna Lehtinen (born 1983), Finnish football midfielder
- Tapio Lehtinen (born 1958), Finnish sailor
- Timo Lehtinen, Finnish musician
- Toni Lehtinen (born 1984), Finnish professional football player
- Torsti Lehtinen (1942–2023), Finnish writer and philosopher
- Tuija Lehtinen (born 1954), Finnish writer
- Ville Lehtinen (born 1978), Finnish footballer
- Virke Lehtinen (1940–2022), Finnish film director, film producer, actor and screenwriter
- William Lehtinen (1895–1975), Finnish forester and business executive
- Yrjö Lehtinen (1891–1945), Finnish politician

== See also ==
- Lehti, the corresponding Laine type surname
