= Lenni Killinen =

Finnish ice hockey player (born 2000)

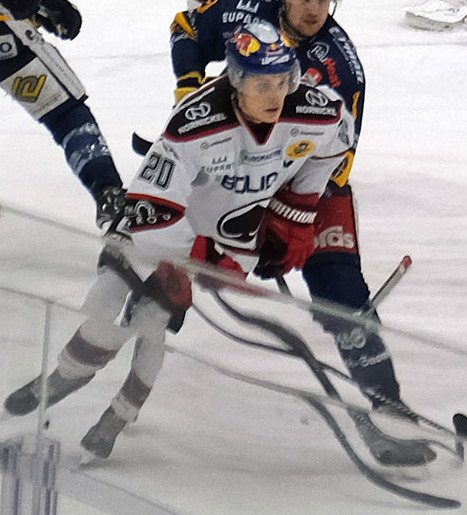
- Lenni Killinen with HC Ässät in 2019
- Born: June 15, 2000 (age 25) Espoo, Finland
- Height: 187 cm (6 ft 2 in)
- Weight: 93 kg (205 lb; 14 st 9 lb)
- Position: Right wing
- Shoots: Left
- Allsv team Former teams: IF Björklöven; Porin Ässät; Lahti Pelicans
- NHL draft: 104th overall, 2018; Carolina Hurricanes
- Playing career: 2018–present

Lenni Onni Oskari Killinen (born 15 June 2000) is a Finnish ice hockey forward who plays for IF Björklöven in the HockeyAllsvenskan (Allsv), the second highest league in Sweden.

== Playing career ==
Killinen was drafted by the Carolina Hurricanes in the fourth round as the 104th overall pick in the 2018 NHL entry draft. Prior to that, in May 2018, he signed a three-year Finnish Elite League contract with the HC Ässät. He made his debut in the opening round of the 2018–19 season on September 14, 2018, away against derby opponent Rauman Lukko. He was assigned to the HC Ässät left wing alongside Mikael Saha and Matti Lamberg. He scored the first goal of his career in his fourth game on October 3, 2018, against Turun Palloseura. In total, Killinen scored 11 points in 32 regular season games. In the 2019–20 season, he scored 17 points in 43 regular season games. In April 2021, Killinen signed a one-year contract extension with HC Ässät.

For the 2022–23 season, Killinen signed a two-year contract with the Pelicans. Killinen played only 31 games in the regular season due to injuries. He won the Finnish Elite League silver medal at the end of the season. Killinen's 2023–24 season was somewhat uneventful and Killinen played 23 games, scoring two assists, until his contract with the club was terminated at the transfer window in February 2024. Killinen transferred to IF Björklöven, playing in Sweden's second-highest league, the HockeyAllsvenskan, for the rest of the season. In April, he signed a one-year contract extension with the club.

== Career statistics ==
=== Regular season and playoffs ===
			Regular season					Playoffs
Season	Team	League	GP	G	A	Pts	PIM	GP	G	A	Pts	PIM
2016–17	Blues	FIN U20	2	1	0	1	0	—	—	—	—	—
2017–18	Blues	FIN U20	38	13	28	41	10	4	0	0	0	0
2017–18	Espoo United	Mestis	10	2	2	4	6	—	—	—	—	—
2018–19	Ässät	Liiga	32	3	8	11	8	—	—	—	—	—
2019–20	Ässät	Liiga	43	7	10	17	12	—	—	—	—	—
2020–21	Ässät	Liiga	37	5	6	11	26	—	—	—	—	—
2021–22	Ässät	Liiga	46	7	4	11	16	—	—	—	—	—
2022–23	Lahti Pelicans	Liiga	31	1	6	7	14	15	0	3	3	4
2023–24	Lahti Pelicans	Liiga	23	0	2	2	29	—	—	—	—	—
2023–24	IF Björklöven	Allsv	7	2	2	4	0	4	1	0	1	4
2024–25	IF Björklöven	Allsv	29	7	11	18	12	1	0	0	0	0
Liiga totals			212	23	36	59	105	15	0	3	3	4

=== International ===
Year	Team	Event	Result	GP	G	A	Pts	PIM
2016	Finland	U17	7th	5	1	1	2	2
2017	Finland	IH18	6th	4	0	1	1	4
2018	Finland	U18	1st place, gold medalist(s)	7	0	0	0	2
2020	Finland	WJC	4th	7	0	2	2	0
Junior totals				23	1	4	5	8
