= Eric Martin =

Eric, Erik, or Éric Martin may refer to:

== Arts and entertainment ==
- Eric Martin (American singer) (born 1960), American singer-songwriter and member of Mr. Big
- Eric Martin (Welsh singer) (born 1970), also known as MC Eric and Me One
- Eric Martin (writer), American television writer
- Erik Martin (writer) (1936–2017), German songwriter

== Sports ==
=== Association football (soccer) ===
- Eric Martin (footballer, born 1946), Scottish footballer
- Éric Martin (footballer, born 1959), French footballer

=== Cricket ===
- Eric Martin (Middlesex cricketer) (1894–1924), English cricketer
- Eric Martin (Essex cricketer) (1907–1978), English cricketer
- Eric Martin (Nottinghamshire cricketer) (1925–2015), English cricketer

=== Other sports ===
- Eric Martin (linebacker) (born 1991), American football linebacker
- Eric Martin (wide receiver) (born 1961), American football wide receiver
- Eric Martin (racing driver) (1969–2002), American racing driver who was killed at the Lowes Motor Speedway
- Eric Martin (lacrosse) (born 1981), American lacrosse player
- Erik Martin (basketball) (born 1971), American basketball player and coach

== Others ==
- Eric Martin (politician) (1905–1973), Canadian politician in British Columbia
