= David Glenn (garden designer) =

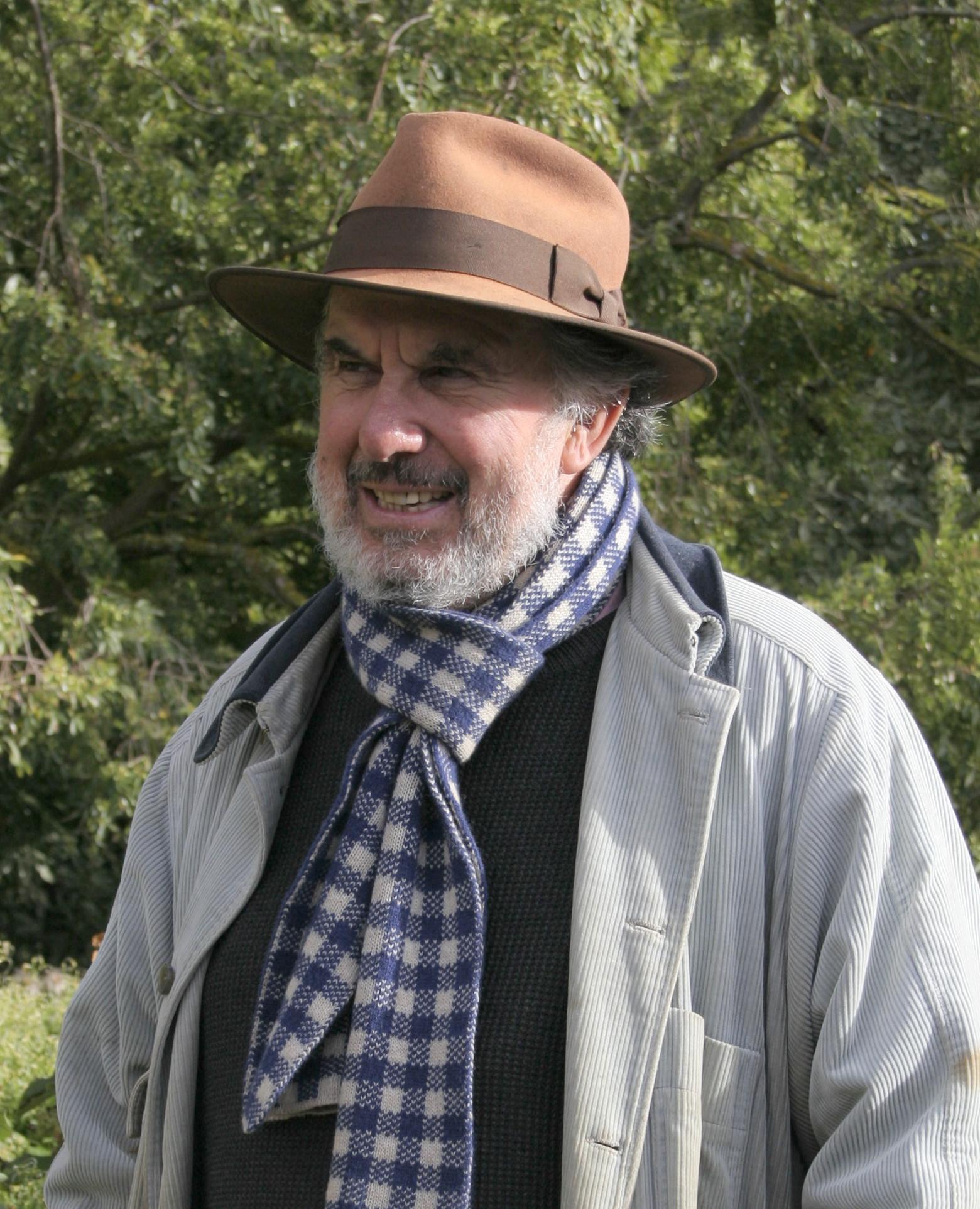
David Glenn

David Glenn is an Australian garden designer. He has been recognised as an early exponent of a new style of Dry Climate Gardening with perennials in Australia. His garden Lambley is located at Ascot, 12 km North of Ballarat in Victoria, Australia. The development of the garden coincided with the millennial drought experienced throughout much of Eastern Australia over the period 2000 to 2010 and earlier. At the time, the garden was recognised internationally for its innovative use of plant types and forms.

It was represented as one of the first really considered responses to the challenges of gardening in the Australian climate without resorting to native plantings.

Glenn is acknowledged in some texts for developing the exemplar for dry climate gardening in the southern hemisphere. The noted Australian designer Paul Bangay has described Lambley as "One of the most famous" dry perennial gardens in the world, while New Zealand Gardener magazine has described Lambley as "one of the best examples of gardening with perennials" in the world.

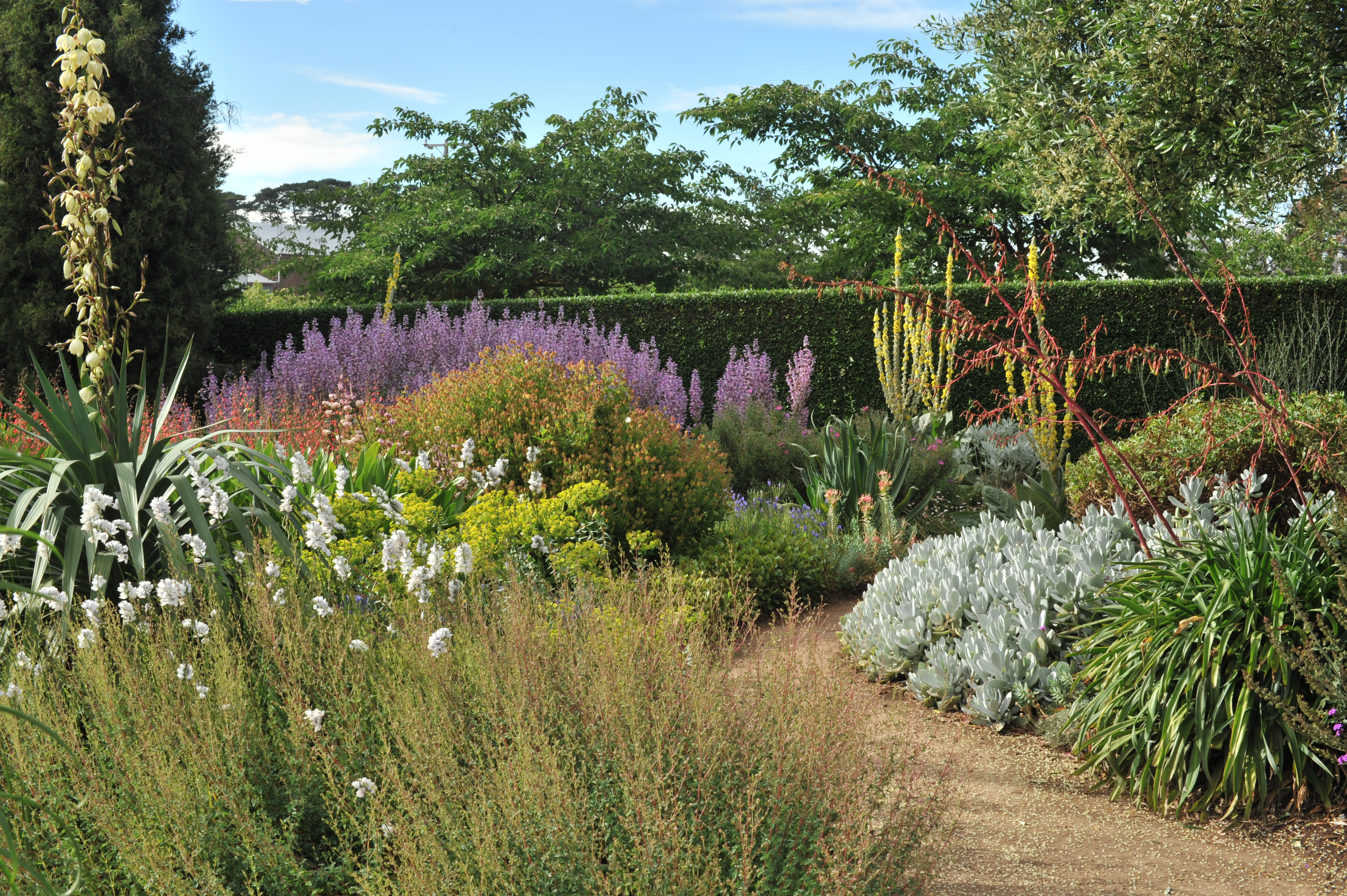
A scene in the Dry Garden at Lambley featuring Yuccas, Verbascum, Origanum and Salvia sclarea

A number of references cite the influence of Glenn's artist wife Criss Canning's instinct for 'shape, texture and colour' in the success of the garden while noting that Canning does not do the physical work of gardening.

== Early life ==
Glenn was born in the United Kingdom to a family with a history of gardening. He emigrated to Australia in the 1960s. David and his still-life painter wife, Criss Canning, established Lambley in 1987. Prior to this time Glenn conducted a wholesale plant nursery at Olinda in Melbourne's, Dandenong Ranges. The name of the garden refers to Glenn's childhood home, Lambley Village in Nottinghamshire in the east midlands region of England in the United Kingdom.

== Plant breeding ==
Plants selected by Glenn are grown throughout the world. The patented Euphorbia × martini 'Ascot Rainbow' is to be found in gardens throughout Europe and the United States where it is grown for its frost tolerance and intense variegation which is said to be quite unmatched in the Genus. The plant featured on the cover of the Royal Horticultural Society journal 'The Plantsman' in March 2013. In a similar tribute, Agastache 'Sweet Lili' has been lauded by Australian garden designers as a 'superlative new selection' Paul Bangay has written of the same plant, "I use this in all my gardens as it is such a long-flowering plant and has a very distinct and unusual flower colour".

== Design approaches ==
Glenn's approach to garden design is characterised as fluid by some references. The highly regarded Australian gardening writer Michael McCoy cites an instance in which Glenn confessed his frustration with garden writers, "that built whole articles around ideas they'd had for planting combinations, when it was his experience...that most ideas don't work, or need very substantial fine-tuning or reconfiguring before they can be made to work. At very best they lead to an idea that does work".

At the same time, other reports describe Glenn as an advocate for 'discipline' when organising garden beds. A central idea is described as "creating a series of vertical accents in the horizontal design space". Also the inclusion in any garden of quiet green spaces to 'rest the eye' has been highlighted as a core principle in any Glenn garden.

One aspect that differentiates Glenn's approach from other Australian designers is his extensive use of bulbous plants. Glenn has written of his success with bulbs in the climate of inland south-eastern Australia. In one instance Glenn has written of bulbs from Turkey which are planted in his garden that "prefer to be dry during summer, the drier the better".

== Plant selection ==
Glenn has been distinguished in some texts on Australian Garden Design schools of thought because of the breadth of his plant selection palette. He was quoted on Gardenista as saying, "I choose plants because of their beauty, and because I want to make a beautiful garden...I don't want to make a political statement". The latter being a reference to what he refers to as a "rather intolerant horticultural chauvinism" [towards non-native plants] exhibited by Australian garden designers.

== Lambley Gardens ==
David Glenn's garden has been widely lauded as a 'dynamic' and exciting work where Glenn's design principles find their fullest expression. One writer identifies a key design idea as the creation of a series of 'waves and fountains' in the garden. Other sources have identified the work as "a must-see for obsessive plant-aholics and anyone needing inspiration for gardening in Australia’s hot and dry climate”.

At the start of 2026 the gardens were open daily and continued to be operated by Glenn. In February 2023 it was announced in the Australian media that the property was to be sold. In August 2026 it was noted on the business website that the property had been sold and continued to trade under new ownership.
