= Murder of Stuart Rattle =

2013 murder in Melbourne, Australia

Stuart Charles Rattle (16 November 1960 – 4 December 2013) was an Australian interior designer who was murdered by Michael Anthony O'Neill, his partner of 16 years, in their South Yarra home following an argument.

== Background ==
Rattle was the owner of Stuart Rattle Interior Design in Melbourne, a high-end interior design firm that catered to an affluent clientele. His work appeared in magazines such as Belle and on television programs such as Gardening Australia.

O'Neill, originally from Ireland, was working as a waiter at an Italian bistro when he met Rattle in the 1990s. O'Neill began working for Rattle's firm, where his responsibilities included accounting, quoting, invoicing and ordering stock for clients.

== Murder ==
On 4 December 2013, O'Neill struck Rattle with a frying pan and then strangled him with a dog leash after an argument. O'Neill pretended for the next five days that Rattle was still alive, sending text messages from Rattle's phone and telling friends Rattle was unwell. He then burned down the home and attempted to make it appear to be an accident involving candles. O'Neill confessed to killing Rattle when police found inconsistencies in his account of what happened.

== Trial ==
O'Neill pleaded guilty to one count of murder and one count of arson. He was diagnosed with 'dependent personality disorder with prominent features of narcissistic personality disorder' by his treating psychologist; defence counsel argued this was a mitigating factor, which the prosecution did not contest. O'Neill was sentenced to 18 years in prison with a non-parole period of 13 years.

Rattle's estate, worth $1 million, was given to his parents after the court deemed O'Neill, the beneficiary of Rattle's will, ineligible to benefit.

== Books ==
The murder was the subject of the book Smoke and Mirrors by Robin Bowles.

Rattle's home was profiled in the book Stuart Rattle's Musk Farm, featuring a foreword by Paul Bangay.

A tribute to Rattle appeared in Vogue Australia.

== See also ==
- Murder of Brent Sikkema
- Death of Janne Puhakka
