= HC Keski-Uusimaa =

Finnish ice hockey team

- City: Kerava, Finland
- League: Mestis
- Founded: 2008
- Home arena: Keravan jäähalli
- Colours
- General manager: (Finland) Tuomo Tammesvirta
- Head coach: (Finland) Mikael Kotkaniemi
- Captain: (Finland) Olli Korkeavuori
- Affiliate: HIFK (Liiga)
- Website: http://www.hckhockey.fi/

HC Keski-Uusimaa known as HCK is a Finnish ice hockey team based in Kerava, Finland. The team was founded in 2008 and began play in the Suomi-sarja, the third level of hockey in Finland, before being promoted to the Mestis for the 2012–13 season.

In their first season in Mestis they finished 12th and lost to K-Vantaa in the playouts, but won their way out of being relegated back to Suomi-sarja by accumulating a 5 win, 1 overtime win, 0 loss record against RoKi, KeuPa HT, and Pyry Nokia from the Suomi-sarja in the qualification round.

== Current roster ==
Updated December 16, 2013

No.	Nat	Player	Pos	S/G	Age	Acquired	Birthplace
31	(Finland)	Aleksis Ahlqvist	G	L	39	2013	Jyväskylä, Finland
12	(Finland)	Juuso Forsström (A)	LW	L	35	2012	Lohja, Finland
15	(Finland)	Miiko Hintz	RW	L	33	2012	Nokia, Finland
5	(Finland)	Jani Honkanen	D	L	46	2013	Espoo, Finland
34	(Finland)	Ville Husso (L)	G	L	30	2013	Helsinki, Finland
14	(Finland)	Joonas Hyttinen	C	R	36	2012	Kajaani, Finland
10	(Finland)	Nikke Kettukangas	D	L	33	2012	Kerava, Finland
28	(Finland)	Janne Kivilahti	F	L	33	2013	Espoo, Finland
27	(Finland)	Kimi Koivisto	F	L	33	2013	Heinola, Finland
42	(Finland)	Tero Konttinen	D	L	40	2012	Helsinki, Finland
6	(Finland)	Olli Korkeavuori (C)	D	L	46	2012	Riihimäki, Finland
44	(Finland)	Vesa Kulmala	D	L	39	2012	Vantaa, Finland
91	(Finland)	Jere Laine	LW	R	35	2009	Tuusula, Finland
8	(Finland)	Tommi Laine	C	L	39	2013	Naantali, Finland
16	(Finland)	Joel Lehtinen	F	L	34	2013	Helsinki, Finland
9	(Finland)	Otto-Eemeli Linke	D	L	35	2012	Turku, Finland
74	(Finland)	Edgar Lukjanov	C	L	36	2011	Tartu, Estonia
24	(Finland)	Tomi Mustonen	LW	L	42	2012	Oulu, Finland
13	(Finland)	Matias Perkkiö	RW	L	38	2013	Oulu, Finland
93	(Finland)	Niko Piiparinen (L)	C	L	36	2012	Helsinki, Finland
11	(Finland)	Roope Ranta	RW	R	37	2013	Helsinki, Finland
20	(Finland)	Kristian Ruisma	C	L	35	2013	Pori, Finland
21	(Finland)	Tony Sandberg	D	L	37	2012	Vantaa, Finland
19	(Finland)	Pasi Salonen	LW	L	40	2013	Helsinki, Finland
1	(Finland)	Jaakko Suomalainen (L)	G	L	47	2013	Helsinki, Finland
26	(Finland)	Joni Töykkälä	C	L	41	2013	Espoo, Finland
35	(Finland)	Richard Ullberg	G	L	32	2013	Sipoo, Finland
17	(Finland)	Jesse Uronen (A)	LW	L	39	2011	Helsinki, Finland
23	(Finland)	Paavo Ylipaino	D	L	34	2012	Vammala, Finland

== History ==
=== Season by season record ===
Season	League	GP	W	T	L	OTW	OTL	Pts	GF	GA	Finish	Playoffs
2008–09	Suomi-sarja	14	2	—	11	0	1	7	42	69	8th	—
2008–09	Suomi-sarja	20	11	—	8	1	0	35	96	82	2nd	—
2009–10	Suomi-sarja	14	3	—	9	0	2	11	58	81	7th	—
2009–10	Suomi-sarja	20	9	—	7	2	2	33	99	80	3rd	—
2010–11	Suomi-sarja	22	15	—	1	4	2	55	129	64	2nd	Qualification loss
2010–11	Suomi-sarja	14	7	—	3	3	1	28	78	45	3rd	—
2011–12	Suomi-sarja	14	9	—	9	2	0	31	83	47	1st	Promoted
2011–12	Suomi-sarja	22	16	—	4	2	0	52	125	75	2nd	Promoted
2012–13	Mestis	48	11	—	26	6	5	50	110	168	12th	Saved in relegation series

=== Retired numbers ===
- #22 Joakim Roslund

=== Franchise records ===
Games Played
Player	Games played
Jere Laine	137
Sami Taanonen	120
Jesse Juntheikki	96
Toni Jeskanen	91
Mikko Siren	85

Points
Player	Points
Mikko Siren	113
Toni Jeskanen	113
Jesse Juntheikki	108
Jesse Nuutinen	108
Esa Kivistö	99

Goals
Player	Goals
Esa Kivistö	70
Jesse Juntheikki	55
Mikko Siren	47
Toni Jeskanen	42
Jesse Uronen	39

Points per game
Player	PPG
Ville Kiiskinen	1.611
Esa Kivistö	1.523
Aki Tuominen	1.379
Jesse Nuutinen	1.333
Mikko Siren	1.329
