= Espoo United (ice hockey) =

- City: Espoo, Finland
- League: Mestis
- Founded: 2016
- Operated: 2018
- Home arena: Espoo Metro Areena (capacity: 6,982)
- Colours
- Owner: (Finland) Jussi Salonoja
- General manager: (Finland) Olli Aro
- Head coach: (Finland) Timo Hirvonen
- Captain: (Finland) Kim Hirschovits
- Website: www.espoounited.fi

Espoo United was a Finnish semi-professional ice hockey team that played in the Mestis. The team was formed by Jussi Salonoja after the Espoo Blues went bankrupt in 2016. United went bankrupt themselves after the 2017–18 season.

== Honours ==
=== Mestis ===
- (bronze) Mestis (1): 2017

== Final roster ==
Updated October 7, 2016

No.	Nat	Player	Pos	S/G	Age	Acquired	Birthplace
8	(Finland)	Jani Elgbacka	LW/C	L	31	2016	Helsinki, Finland
44	(Finland)	Kim Hirschovits (C)	C	L	44	2016	Helsinki, Finland
17	(Finland)	Erno Hopponen	D	L	29	2016	Espoo, Finland
51	(Finland)	Olli Iisakka	LW	L	30	2016	Espoo, Finland
7	(Finland)	Aleksi Järvinen	RW	L	33	2016	Espoo, Finland
19	(Finland)	Juuso Kaijomaa	C	L	37	2016	Joensuu, Finland
47	(Finland)	Antti Kauppinen	F	L	30	2016	Espoo, Finland
50	(Finland)	Nikke Kettukangas	D	L	29	2016	Kerava, Finland
24	(Finland)	Janne Kivilahti	F	L	34	2016	Espoo, Finland
91	(Finland)	Jere Laine	LW	R	36	2016	Tuusula, Finland
9	(Finland)	Matti Lamberg	RW	R	33	2016	Kiiminki, Finland
20	(Finland)	Valtteri Lipiäinen	F	R	29	2016	Lappeenranta, Finland
58	(Finland)	Sebastian Moberg	D	L	30	2016	Espoo, Finland
22	(Finland)	Emil Oksanen	RW	R	28	2016	Kirkkonummi, Finland
18	(Finland)	Markus Piispanen (A)	W	R	37	2016	Jyväskylä, Finland
77	(Finland)	Janne Puhakka (A)	F	L	31	2016	Espoo, Finland
31	(Finland)	Samuli Rasilainen	G	L	30	2016	Oulu, Finland
88	(Finland)	Jimi Santala (A)	D	L	38	2016	Helsinki, Finland
2	(Finland)	Niklas Sillanpää	D	L	31	2016	Espoo, Finland
21	(Finland)	Juha Tarkkanen	D	L	33	2016	Helsinki, Finland
55	(Finland)	Niklas Tikkinen	D	L	32	2016	Espoo, Finland
32	(Finland)	Rasmus Tirronen	G	L	35	2016	Espoo, Finland
23	(Finland)	Oskari Uomala	F	L	28	2016	Espoo (?), Finland
39	(Finland)	Jiri Veistola (A)	W	R	38	2016	Vantaa, Finland
28	(Finland)	Victor Westermarck	D	R	32	2016	Espoo, Finland
16	(Finland)	Nicolas Wuolle	RW	L	33	2016	Helsinki, Finland
27	(Finland)	Joel Ylä-Mononen	D	L	31	2016	Kauniainen, Finland

=== Team Officials ===
Updated October 7, 2016

Title	Staff Member
General Manager	Olli Aro
Head Coach	Timo Hirvonen
Assistant Coach	Saku Martikainen
Goaltending Coach	Ilari Näckel
Sports Manager	Petri Pakaslahti
Team Manager	Ilari Näckel
