= Juuso Forsström =

Finnish ice hockey forward

- Born: March 28, 1990 (age 34); Lohja, Finland
- Height: 5 ft 9 in (175 cm)
- Weight: 165 lb (75 kg; 11 st 11 lb)
- Position: Forward
- Shoots: Right
- Mestis team Former teams: SaPKo; Kiekko-Laser; JYP-Akatemia; HC Keski-Uusimaa; Espoo United
- Playing career: 2011–present

Juuso Forsström (born May 28, 1990) is a Finnish professional ice hockey forward playing for SaPKo of Mestis.

Forsström played for Blues at U16, U18 and U20 level but was unable to break into their main roster before his release in 2011. He signed for Kiekko-Laser of Mestis on May 18, 2011, but the team went bankrupt by December and he joined JYP-Akatemia for the remainder of the season. On April 26, 2012, Forsström moved to HC Keski-Uusimaa and remained for two seasons.

Forsström joined SaPKo on May 9, 2014, and won a league championship with the team in 2017. On May 8, 2017, he moved to Espoo United, playing for one season before rejoining SaPKo on March 23, 2018.
