= Piiparinen =

Piiparinen is a surname. Notable people with the surname include:

- Garry Piiparinen, American politician
- Niko Piiparinen (born 1989), Finnish ice hockey player
