= Jiri Veistola =

Finnish ice hockey player

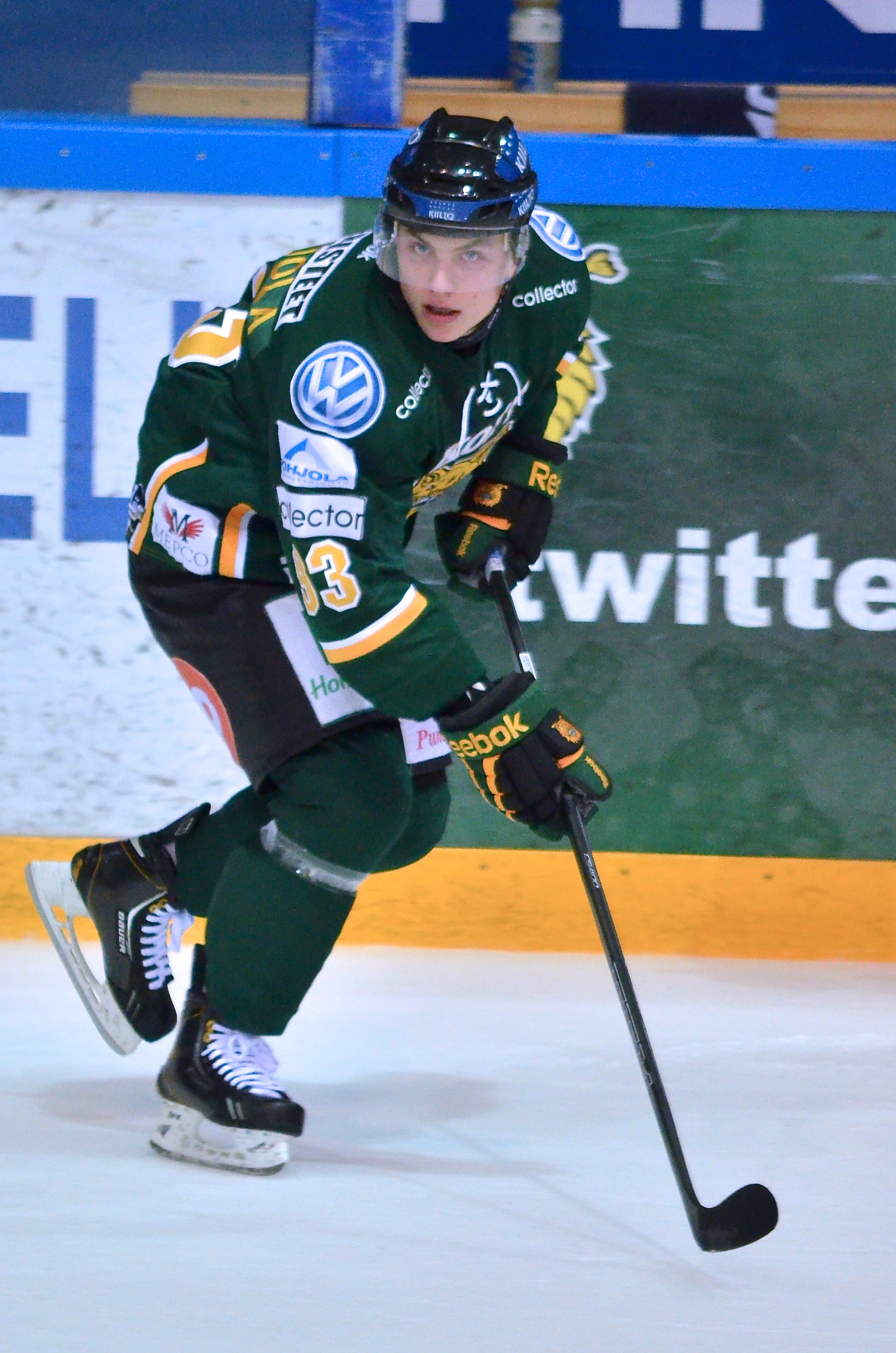
- Born: March 21, 1988 (age 36); Helsinki, Finland
- Height: 5 ft 10 in (178 cm)
- Weight: 176 lb (80 kg; 12 st 8 lb)
- Position: Right wing
- Shot: Right
- Liiga team Former teams: Ilves; Jokerit
- NHL draft: Undrafted
- Playing career: 2007–2018

Jiri Veistola (born March 21, 1988) is a Finnish ice hockey player. His is currently playing with Ilves in the Finnish SM-liiga.

Veistola made his SM-liiga debut playing with Jokerit during the 2007–08 SM-liiga season.

== Career statistics ==
			Regular season					Playoffs
Season	Team	League	GP	G	A	Pts	PIM	GP	G	A	Pts	PIM
2003–04	Jokerit U16	U16 SM-sarja	22	12	7	19	59	—	—	—	—	—
2004–05	Jokerit U18	U18 SM-sarja	27	1	5	6	26	1	0	0	0	0
2005–06	Jokerit U18	U18 SM-sarja	17	7	2	9	16	3	0	2	2	4
2005–06	Jokerit U20	U20 SM-liiga	25	1	0	1	8	4	0	0	0	2
2006–07	Jokerit U20	U20 SM-liiga	41	10	18	28	53	5	1	0	1	4
2006–07	Suomi U20	Mestis	2	0	0	0	0	—	—	—	—	—
2007–08	Jokerit U20	U20 SM-liiga	39	13	9	22	42	4	0	1	1	12
2007–08	Jokerit	SM-liiga	14	0	0	0	0	3	1	0	1	0
2007–08	Suomi U20	Mestis	4	0	0	0	2	—	—	—	—	—
2008–09	Jokerit U20	U20 SM-liiga	38	16	12	28	44	4	0	2	2	2
2008–09	Jokerit	SM-liiga	11	0	0	0	8	—	—	—	—	—
2009–10	KooKoo	Mestis	44	9	5	14	40	10	0	0	0	10
2010–11	KooKoo	Mestis	46	11	5	16	41	4	0	0	0	2
2011–12	KooKoo	Mestis	22	3	4	7	12	—	—	—	—	—
2012–13	Kiekko-Vantaa	Mestis	40	5	8	13	22	—	—	—	—	—
2012–13	Jokerit	SM-liiga	8	0	0	0	31	—	—	—	—	—
2013–14	Ilves	Liiga	47	6	7	13	14	—	—	—	—	—
2013–14	LeKi	Mestis	1	1	1	2	0	—	—	—	—	—
2014–15	Ilves	Liiga	43	6	1	7	38	2	0	0	0	2
2015–16	Ilves	Liiga	58	4	4	8	22	—	—	—	—	—
2016–17	Espoo United	Mestis	47	15	11	26	106	10	2	1	3	6
2017–18	Espoo United	Mestis	48	13	11	24	34	—	—	—	—	—
SM-liiga totals			181	16	12	28	113	5	1	0	1	2
Mestis totals			254	57	45	102	257	24	2	1	3	18
