= Kaijomaa =

Surname list

Kaijomaa is a Finnish surname. Notable people with the surname include:

- Juuso Kaijomaa (born 1989), Finnish ice hockey player
- Kalle Kaijomaa (born 1984), Finnish ice hockey player
