= Benoitia deserticola =

Desert funnel-web spider

Scientific classification
- Kingdom: Animalia
- Phylum: Arthropoda
- Subphylum: Chelicerata
- Class: Arachnida
- Order: Araneae
- Infraorder: Araneomorphae
- Family: Agelenidae
- Genus: Benoitia
- Species: B. deserticola

Binomial name
- Benoitia deserticola (Simon, 1910)

Synonyms
- Agelena deserticola Simon, 1910; Maimuna deserticola (Simon, 1910)

Species of spider

Benoitia deserticola is a species of funnel-web spider in the family Agelenidae. It is endemic to southern Africa and is commonly known as the desert funnel-web spider.

The specific epithet deserticola derives from Latin meaning "desert dweller", referring to the species' habitat in arid regions.

== Taxonomy ==
The species was originally described by Eugène Simon in 1910 as Agelena deserticola based on specimens from Namibia. It was later transferred to the genus Maimuna by Lehtinen in 1967, and finally to its current placement in Benoitia by Levy in 1996.

== Distribution ==
Benoitia deserticola is found across Botswana, Namibia, and South Africa.

In South Africa, it has been recorded from four provinces, including the Eastern Cape, Northern Cape, and Western Cape.

Specific localities include Barkly East in the Eastern Cape, Kamaggas in the Northern Cape, and several sites in the Western Cape including the Swartberg Nature Reserve, Karoo National Park, and Mamre.

== Habitat ==
Benoitia deserticola inhabits various biomes including Fynbos, Grassland, Savanna, and Succulent Karoo. The species is a web dweller that constructs characteristic funnel-webs in low vegetation close to the soil surface. Specimens have also been collected from caves, indicating some habitat flexibility.

The species occurs at elevations ranging from 183 to 1,781 metres above sea level.

== Description ==
Males measure 6-7 mm in body length, while females are larger at 7-10 mm.

Males have a pale yellowish cephalothorax that is longer than wide, with darkish markings on the thoracic region and reticulated segments. The ocular region is black and covered with snow-white plumose hairs. The anterior eyes are closely spaced and form a strongly procurved line, with the median eyes being about one-quarter larger than the laterals. The clypeus is quite wide and vertical. The opisthosoma is narrowly oblong, olive-coloured above with light black punctation, and has two parallel stripes at the front with small dark spots arranged in series towards the rear.

Females differ from males primarily in their larger size and have larger white spots on the upper surface of the abdomen arranged in two series. The anterior eyes are less closely spaced than in males, and the legs have black spines and are more robust. The genital region shows characteristic features including a dark, shiny genital plate that is barely wider than long.

== Conservation status ==
Benoitia deserticola is classified as Least Concern due to its wide geographical range across southern Africa. The species is protected within two South African nature reserves: the Swartberg Nature Reserve and Karoo National Park. No significant threats have been identified, and no specific conservation actions are currently recommended.
