= Toni Leinonen =

Finnish ice hockey player

- Born: 8 November 1991 (age 34) Helsinki, Finland
- Height: 5 ft 8 in (173 cm)
- Weight: 154 lb (70 kg; 11 st 0 lb)
- Position: Forward
- Shot: Left
- Played for: HIFK; Kiekko-Vantaa; HC Keski-Uusimaa; Vaasan Sport; Jokipojat
- NHL draft: Undrafted
- Playing career: 2011–2019

Toni Leinonen (born 8 November 1991) is a Finnish ice hockey player. He made his SM-liiga debut playing with the HIFK during the 2011–12 season, and most recently played in the Finnish Liiga in 2019.

== Career statistics ==
			Regular season					Playoffs
Season	Team	League	GP	G	A	Pts	PIM	GP	G	A	Pts	PIM
2006–07	HooCee U16	U16 I-Divisioona Q	8	5	6	11	6	—	—	—	—	—
2006–07	HooCee U16	U16 I-Divisioona	11	11	9	20	43	3	5	2	7	4
2007–08	HooCee U18	U18 I-Divisioona	24	4	9	13	36	—	—	—	—	—
2008–09	EHC U18	U18 SM-sarja Q	9	2	2	4	6	—	—	—	—	—
2008–09	EHC U8	U18 SM-sarja	20	6	5	11	6	—	—	—	—	—
2009–10	HIFK U20	U20 SM-liiga	36	7	10	17	26	14	1	2	3	8
2010–11	HIFK U20	U20 SM-liiga	41	10	12	22	20	5	1	0	1	0
2011–12	HIFK U20	U20 SM-liiga	32	13	14	27	53	8	3	0	3	0
2011–12	HIFK	SM-liiga	7	1	0	1	0	—	—	—	—	—
2011–12	Kiekko-Vantaa	Mestis	3	0	1	1	0	—	—	—	—	—
2012–13	HIFK U20	U20 SM-liiga	5	3	4	7	0	—	—	—	—	—
2012–13	HIFK	SM-liiga	34	4	3	7	8	7	1	2	3	2
2012–13	HC Keski-Uusimaa	Mestis	5	1	0	1	0	—	—	—	—	—
2013–14	HIFK	Liiga	55	5	3	8	10	2	0	0	0	0
2014–15	HIFK	Liiga	16	0	0	0	12	—	—	—	—	—
2014–15	Kiekko-Vantaa	Mestis	18	7	5	12	8	—	—	—	—	—
2014–15	Vaasan Sport	Liiga	14	0	2	2	2	—	—	—	—	—
2015–16	Kiekko-Vantaa	Mestis	38	6	15	21	16	7	3	3	6	0
2016–17	Kiekko-Vantaa	Mestis	50	15	30	45	24	14	2	4	6	8
2017–18	Kiekko-Vantaa	Mestis	46	6	15	21	37	4	0	0	0	0
2018–19	Jokipojat	Mestis	45	11	22	33	14	5	1	4	5	0
Liiga totals			126	10	8	18	32	9	1	2	3	2
Mestis totals			205	46	88	134	99	30	6	11	17	8
