= Victor Westermarck =

Finnish ice hockey player

- Born: 26 February 1994 (age 31); Espoo, Finland
- Height: 6 ft 2 in (188 cm)
- Weight: 203 lb (92 kg; 14 st 7 lb)
- Position: Defence
- Shot: Right
- Played for: LeKi; Espoo Blues; Kiekko-Vantaa; Espoo United; Vaasan Sport
- NHL draft: Undrafted
- Playing career: 2013–2022

Victor Westermarck (born 26 February 1994) is a Finnish professional ice hockey defenceman currently playing for the Espoo Blues in the Liiga.

== Playing career ==
Westermarck played in the Espoo Blues organisation at the U16, U18 and U20 levels before moving to Tappara in 2013 and playing in their U20 program for the 2013–14 season. During the 2013–14 season Westermarck was also loaned to Leki and played 7 games in the Mestis.

For the 2014–15 season Westermarck was back with the Blues and played most of the season in the Liiga with a temporary loan to Kiekko-Vantaa of the Mestis.

== Career statistics ==
			Regular season					Playoffs
Season	Team	League	GP	G	A	Pts	PIM	GP	G	A	Pts	PIM
2013–14	Tappara U20	Jr. A SM-liiga	31	4	5	9	14	-	-	-	-	-
2013–14	Leki	Mestis	7	1	1	2	2	-	-	-	-	-
2014–15	Espoo Blues	Liiga	33	1	8	9	12	4	1	0	1	2
2014–15	Blues U20	Jr. A SM-liiga	-	-	-	-	-	1	0	1	1	2
2014–15	Kiekko-Vantaa	Mestis	14	4	3	7	10	-	-	-	-	-
2015–16	Blues U20	Jr. A SM-liiga	1	0	1	1	0	8	3	5	8	4
2015–16	Espoo Blues	Liiga	50	1	5	6	8	-	-	-	-	-
2016–17	Espoo United	Mestis	50	3	9	12	44	11	3	5	8	6
2017–18	Espoo United	Mestis	50	7	13	20	16	-	-	-	-	-
2018–19	Vaasan Sport	Liiga	57	5	6	11	22	-	-	-	-	-
2019–20	Vaasan Sport	Liiga	56	2	8	10	45	-	-	-	-	-
2020–21	Vaasan Sport	Liiga	37	2	2	4	14	2	0	0	0	0
2021–22	Vaasan Sport	Liiga	35	2	1	3	4	-	-	-	-	-
Liiga Totals			268	13	30	43	105	6	1	0	1	2
