= Jesse Juntheikki =

Finnish ice hockey centre

- Born: 10 March 1988 (age 37); Tuusula, Finland
- Height: 5 ft 11 in (180 cm)
- Weight: 185 lb (84 kg; 13 st 3 lb)
- Position: Centre
- Shoots: Left
- FFHG Division 1 team Former teams: Brest Albatros Hockey; Kiekko-Vantaa; Jukurit; HCK; Hermes; Ketterä; Rapaces de Gap
- Playing career: 2008–present

Jesse Juntheikki (born 10 March 1988) is a Finnish professional ice hockey centre currently playing for Brest Albatros Hockey of the FFHG Division 1.

Juntheikki previously played in Mestis for Kiekko-Vantaa, Jukurit, HCK, Hermes and Ketterä. On 25 May 2019 he moved to France and signed for Ligue Magnus side Rapaces de Gap. He departed from the team by November after just ten games and joined Division 1 team Brest.
