= Pasi Salonen =

Finnish ice hockey player

- Born: December 18, 1985 (age 40) Helsinki, FIN
- Height: 5 ft 11 in (180 cm)
- Weight: 194 lb (88 kg; 13 st 12 lb)
- Position: Forward
- Shot: Left
- Played for: HIFK; HPK; Ilves; Ässät
- NHL draft: 138th overall, 2004; Washington Capitals
- Playing career: 2003–2016

Pasi Salonen (born December 18, 1985, in Helsinki) is a Finnish former professional ice hockey forward who played extensively in the Liiga. He was selected by the Washington Capitals in the fifth-round, 138th overall, of the 2004 NHL entry draft.

== Career statistics ==
=== Regular season and playoffs ===
			Regular season					Playoffs
Season	Team	League	GP	G	A	Pts	PIM	GP	G	A	Pts	PIM
2000–01	HIFK	FIN U18	28	8	6	14	4	—	—	—	—	—
2001–02	HIFK	FIN U18	16	10	14	24	39	8	6	4	10	4
2001–02	HIFK	FIN U20	19	5	6	11	2	—	—	—	—	—
2002–03	HIFK	FIN U20	32	16	11	27	10	10	8	3	11	2
2003–04	HIFK	FIN U20	30	12	10	22	60	9	4	4	8	4
2003–04	HIFK	SM-liiga	3	0	0	0	0	—	—	—	—	—
2003–04	Suomi U20	Mestis	3	0	0	0	0	—	—	—	—	—
2005–06	HIFK	FIN U20	10	4	2	6	4	—	—	—	—	—
2005–06	HIFK	SM-liiga	49	5	9	14	6	8	0	0	0	0
2006–07	HIFK	SM-liiga	51	5	7	12	55	2	0	0	0	0
2007–08	HPK	SM-liiga	53	11	17	28	39	—	—	—	—	—
2008–09	HPK	SM-liiga	58	10	14	24	49	6	0	0	0	0
2009–10	Ilves	SM-liiga	57	7	13	20	30	—	—	—	—	—
2010–11	Ässät	SM-liiga	20	5	1	6	0	4	0	0	0	0
2012–13	KooKoo	Mestis	37	4	17	21	20	11	3	2	5	2
2013–14	HCK	Mestis	15	2	3	5	14	—	—	—	—	—
2013–14	Beibarys Atyrau	KAZ	15	4	3	7	6	—	—	—	—	—
2014–15	HSC Csíkszereda	MOL	18	5	9	14	20	—	—	—	—	—
2014–15	HSC Csíkszereda	ROU	1	1	0	1	0	—	—	—	—	—
2014–15	Beibarys Atyrau	KAZ	7	1	1	2	8	—	—	—	—	—
2015–16	Hull Pirates	GBR.2	40	22	21	43	76	—	—	—	—	—
SM-liiga totals			291	43	61	104	179	20	0	0	0	0

=== International ===
Year	Team	Event	GP	G	A	Pts	PIM
2002	Finland	WJC18	8	0	0	0	2
2003	Finland	WJC18	6	2	2	4	4
Junior totals			14	2	2	4	6
