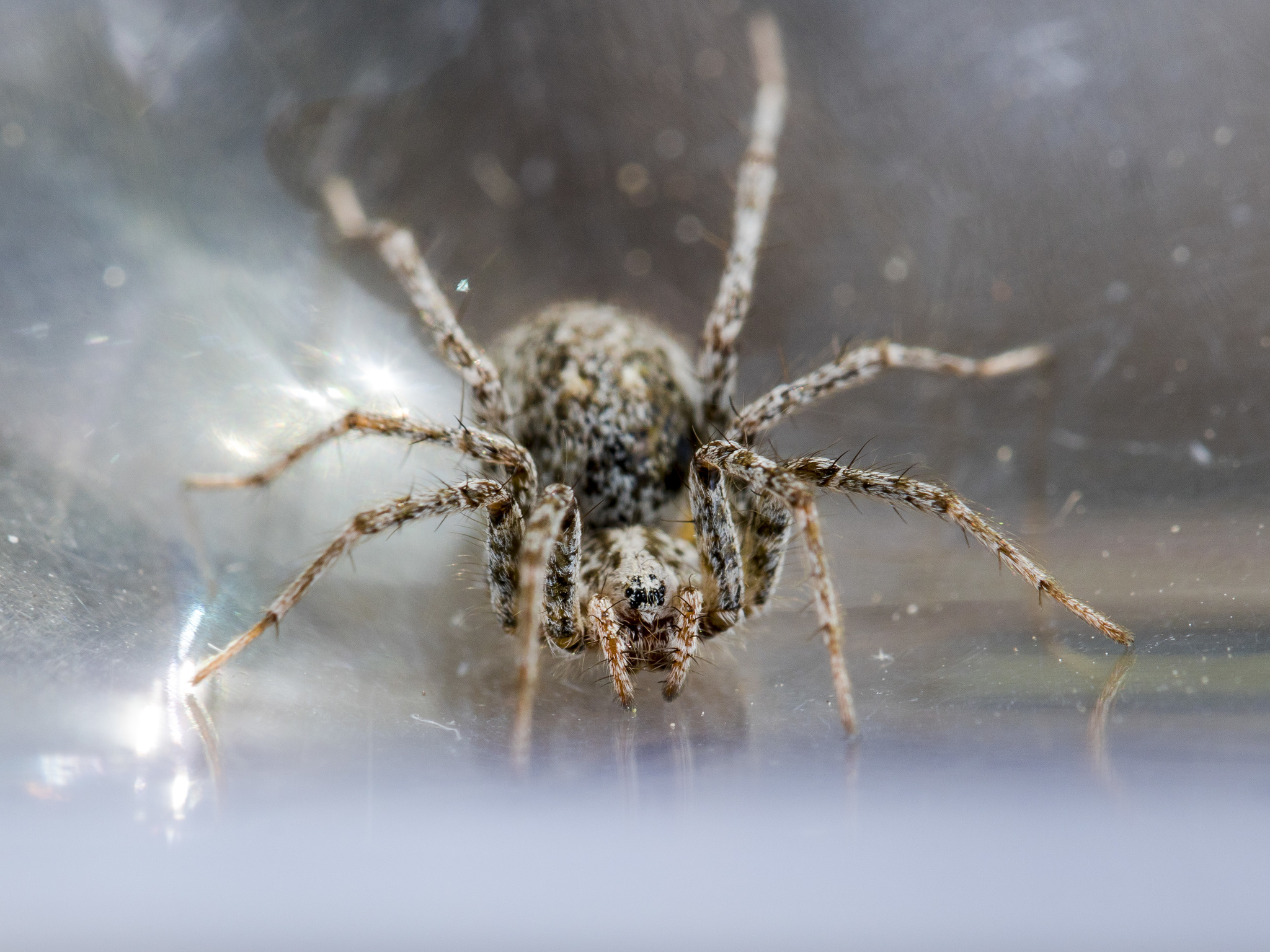
- B. tadzhika
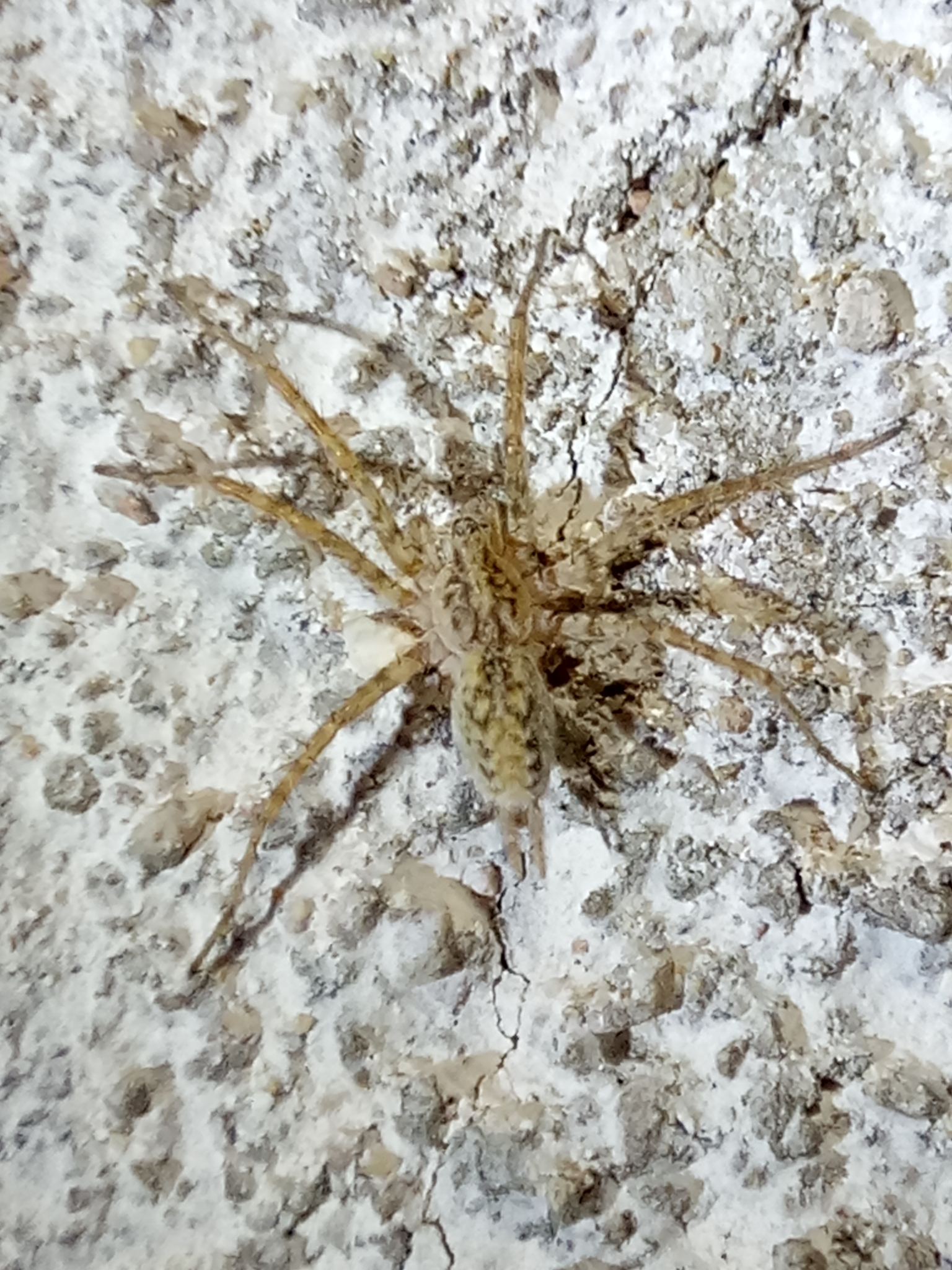
- B. lepida

Scientific classification
- Kingdom: Animalia
- Phylum: Arthropoda
- Subphylum: Chelicerata
- Class: Arachnida
- Order: Araneae
- Infraorder: Araneomorphae
- Family: Agelenidae
- Genus: Benoitia; Lehtinen, 1967

Type species
- B. bornemiszai (Caporiacco, 1947)

Species
- See text.

= Benoitia =

Genus of spiders

Benoitia is a genus of funnel weavers first described by Pekka T. Lehtinen in 1967.

The genus is named after Belgian arachnologist Pierre L. G. Benoit.

== Species ==
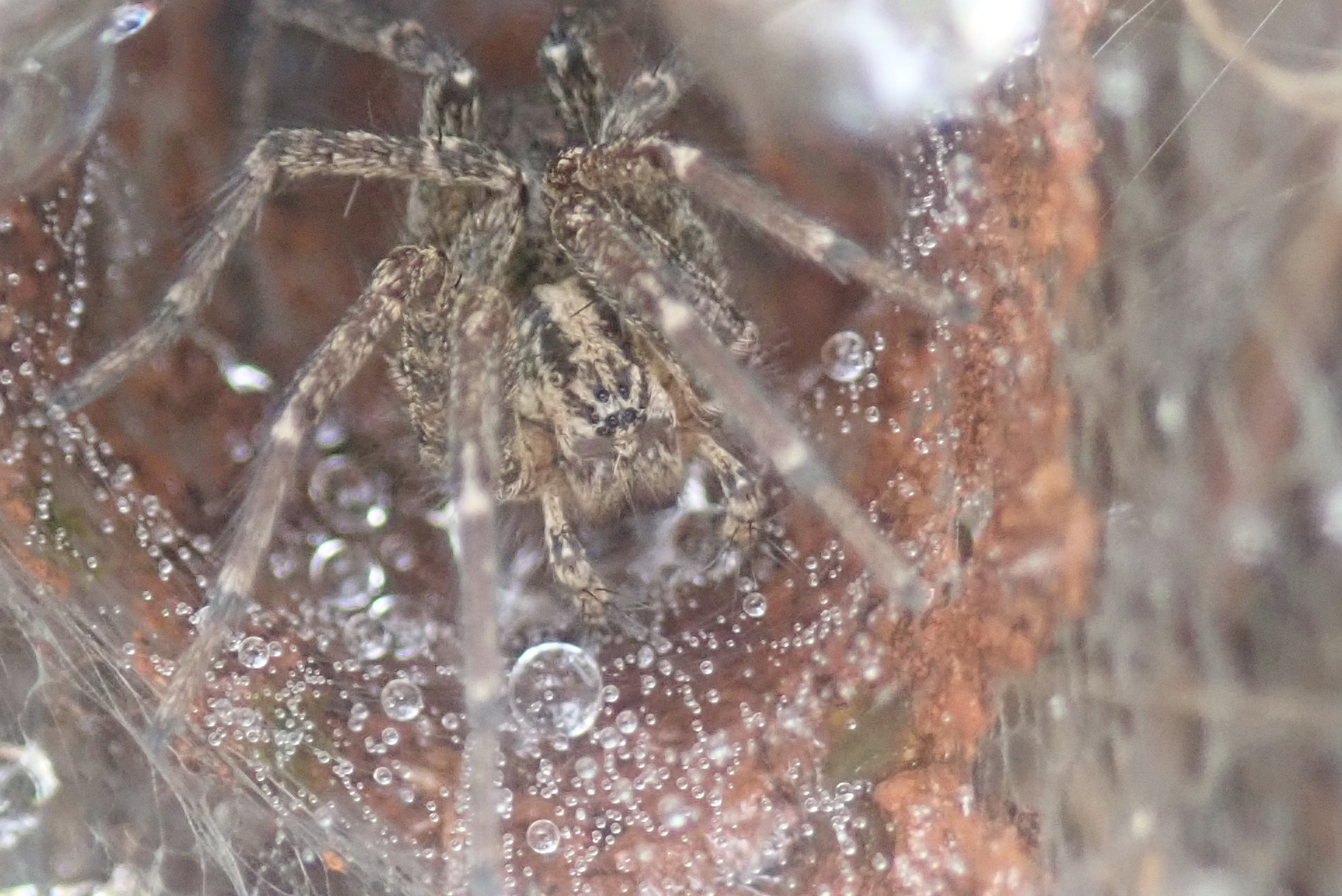
B. ocellata from South Africa

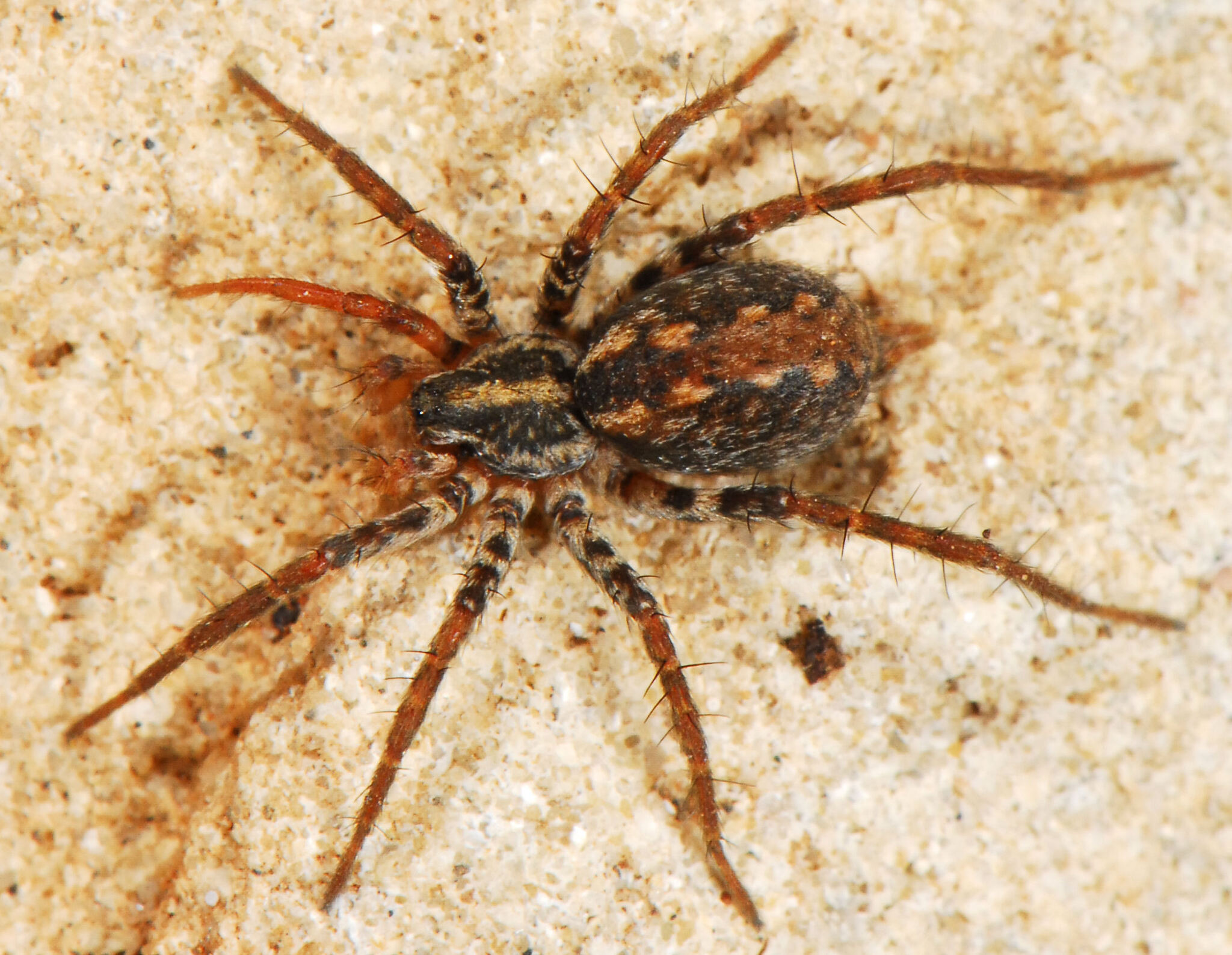
female B. ocellata

As of October 2026, this genus includes ten species:

- Benoitia agraulosa (Wang & Wang, 1991) – China
- Benoitia bornemiszai (Caporiacco, 1947) – Rwanda, Tanzania (type species)
- Benoitia deserticola (Simon, 1910) – Namibia, Botswana, South Africa
- Benoitia lepida (O. Pickard-Cambridge, 1876) – Spain, North Africa, Turkey, Cyprus, Israel, Yemen, Saudi Arabia, Kuwait, Iraq, Iran
- Benoitia ocellata (Pocock, 1900) – Kenya, Namibia, Botswana, South Africa
- Benoitia raymondeae (Lessert, 1915) – Kenya, Tanzania, South Africa
- Benoitia rhodesiae (Pocock, 1901) – Southern Africa
- Benoitia tadzhika (Andreeva, 1976) – Russia, (Europe)
- Benoitia timida (Audouin, 1826) – Egypt, Israel
- Benoitia upembana (Roewer, 1955) – DR Congo
