= Listed buildings in Lambley, Nottinghamshire =

Lambley is a civil parish in the Gedling district of Nottinghamshire, England. The parish contains seven listed buildings that are recorded in the National Heritage List for England. Of these, one is listed at Grade I, the highest of the three grades, and the others are at Grade II, the lowest grade. The parish contains the village of Lambley and the surrounding countryside, and the listed buildings consist of a church, houses and cottages, and a farmhouse with a stable.

== Key ==
Grade	Criteria
I	Buildings of exceptional interest, sometimes considered to be internationally important
II	Buildings of national importance and special interest

== Buildings ==
Name and location	Photograph	Date	Notes	Grade
Holy Trinity Church; 53.00256°N 1.06089°W		11th century	The church has been altered and extended through the centuries, it was largely rebuilt in about 1470, and was restored in 1855. The church is built in stone with tile roofs, and is mainly in Perpendicular style. It consists of a nave, a south porch, a chancel, a vestry and a west tower. The tower is the oldest surviving part of the church, and has four stages, a stepped plinth, clasping buttresses, three string courses, coved eaves and an embattled parapet. Along the body of the church are moulded and chamfered eaves, and moulded coped parapets.	I
16 Church Street; 53.00258°N 1.05976°W		Early 17th century	The cottage is in rendered brick, and has a pantile roof with a single coped gable. There is a single storey and attics, and an L-shaped plan with a front range of three bays, and a wing on the right with four bays. On the front is an off-centre doorway, the windows are casements, and there are two sloping dormers.	II
52 Main Street; 53.00060°N 1.06202°W		Early 17th century	Two houses, later combined, partly timber framed with brick nogging, partly in brick and rendered, on a plinth, it has a roof of tile and pantile with a single coped gable. There are two storeys and attics, and four bays, the left two bays lower. On the front is a single-storey gabled projection, the windows are casements, and at the rear is a sloping dormer.	II
Brookside House; 53.00050°N 1.06634°W		Late 17th century	The house is partly timber framed with brick nogging, partly in brick, and partly rendered and whitewashed, on a stone plinth, with a pantile roof. There are two storeys and three unequal bays, and a single-storey extension on the left. On the front are porches and a doorway, and the windows are a mix of casements and sashes.	II
18 Main Street; 53.00069°N 1.06376°W		Mid 18th century	A house and a shop in brick, with dentilled eaves and a pantile roof. There are two storeys and an L-shaped plan, with a front range of four bays, and a rear single-storey lean-to. To the left is a doorway and a shop window under a segmental arch. To the right is another doorway, and the windows are horizontally-sliding sash windows, the openings in the ground floor under segmental arches.	II
Mill House; 53.00184°N 1.06368°W		c. 1820	The house is in brick with a pantile roof. There are two storeys, and an L-shaped plan, with a main range of three unequal bays, and a rear wing. The door has a stone hood on shaped brackets, it is flanked by sash windows with splayed lintels and keystones, and to the left is a sash window with a segmental head. In the upper floor are a casement window and two sashes.	II
Lambley House and stable 53.01516°N 1.08342°W	—	Early 19th century	A red brick farmhouse on a plinth, with rebated eaves and tile roofs. There are three storeys and an L-shaped plan, with a front range of three bays, the middle bay projecting, and a rear wing. In the centre is a flat-roofed porch, and the windows are sashes. On the east front is a two-storey bow window with a conical roof, and at the west end is a two-storey canted bay window. The adjoining stable has two storeys and a hipped roof, and it contains a central round-arched opening, and a round-headed casement window flanked by roundels.	II
