= Mikael Saha =

Finnish ice hockey player

- Born: March 5, 1995 (age 31) Loimaa, Finland
- Height: 6 ft 2 in (188 cm)
- Weight: 170 lb (77 kg; 12 st 2 lb)
- Position: Forward
- Shoots: Left
- Mestis team Former teams: Kiekko-Vantaa; Ässät
- NHL draft: Undrafted
- Playing career: 2014–present

Mikael Saha (born March 5, 1995) is a Finnish ice hockey player. He is currently playing with Kiekko-Vantaa in the Finnish Mestis.

Saha made his Liiga debut playing with Ässät during the 2014–15 Liiga season.
