= Lambley, Nottinghamshire =

English village in Nottinghamshire

Coordinates: 53.001°N 1.063°W

Lambley
- Village and civil parish
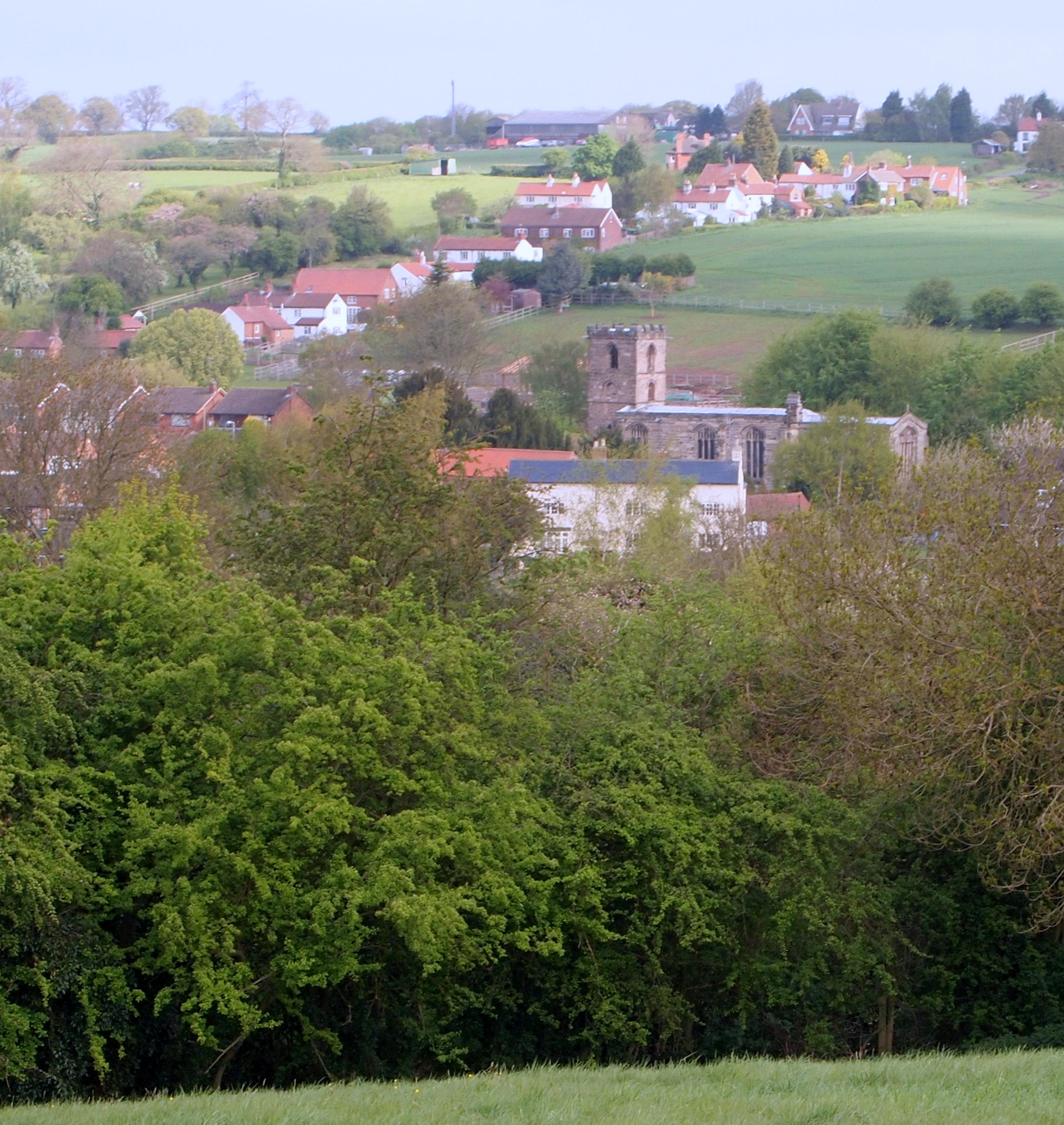
- Lambley Village.

- Location within Nottinghamshire
- Interactive map of Lambley
- Area: 4.00 sq mi (10.4 km^{2})
- Population: 1,231 (2021)
  - Density: 308/sq mi (119/km^{2})
- OS grid reference: SK 62874 45298
  - London: 110 mi (180 km) SSE
- District: Borough of Gedling
- Shire county: Nottinghamshire
- Region: East Midlands
- Country: England
- Sovereign state: United Kingdom
- Settlements: Lambley; Wicketwood Hill
- Post town: NOTTINGHAM
- Postcode district: NG4
- Dialling code: 0115
- Police: Nottinghamshire
- Fire: Nottinghamshire
- Ambulance: East Midlands
- UK Parliament: Sherwood
- Website: www.lambleyparishcouncil.org.uk

Lambley is an English village and civil parish near Nottingham, England, hardly touched by urbanisation, as it lies in a green belt. The population recorded in the 2011 census was 1,247, marginally falling to 1,231 at the 2021 census. Its proximity to Nottingham (7 mi or 11 km) has tended to raise the price of local properties.

== Governance and environment ==
Lambley comes under the Lambley Parish Council Gedling Borough Council and Nottinghamshire County Council for local government purposes.

Lambley Dumbles are secluded places noted for their geology and ancient woodland rich in flowers and ferns. They are accessed along three marked village trails.

Wicketwood Hill was a wood in medieval times south of Lambley village, then a hamlet on the downhill part of Spring Lane. Newer maps show it as a wider residential area west of Wood Farm.

== Toponymy ==
The name Lambley contains the Old English words lamb and lēah meaning a forest, wood, glade, clearing, and later pasture. The name means "lamb's meadow".

== History ==
Flint tools found in fields near Lambley point to Neolithic and Bronze Age settlement. It is mentioned in Domesday Book (1086) as Lambeleia.

The parish church of Holy Trinity is a Grade I listed building. It has been designated "one of the few entirely Perpendicular village churches in Notts, all of a piece and of felicitous proportions tall and narrow, all the windows high and spacious." The only earlier section is part of the west tower (12th–13th centuries). Rebuilding was financed by Ralph, Lord Cromwell (see under Notable people).

Nine men born in Lambley are reported to have died in action in the First World War.

=== Notable people ===
In order of birth:

- Ralph de Cromwell, 3rd Baron Cromwell (c. 1393–1456), Lord Treasurer of England to Henry VI responsible for submitting the first budget to Parliament, was born in the village and funded the building of much of the church.
- John de Crumbewell (fl. 14th c.), parson of Lambley, was given a pardon for outlawry in 1360.
- Eric Martin (1925–2015), first-class cricketer for Nottinghamshire, was born in the village.
- David Glenn (living), plantsman and gardener, has named his Australian garden "Lambley" after his childhood home.
- Mark Spencer (born 1970), elected a Conservative MP for Sherwood in 2010, attended Lambley Primary School.

== Transport ==
The nearest railway station is Lowdham, (3 1/2 mi or 5.5 km) on the Lincoln–Newark–Nottingham line.

There are occasional bus links with Nottingham, Arnold, Netherfield and nearby villages.

The A6097 and A612 trunk roads pass through Lowdham.

== Bus services ==
Trent Barton The Calverton: Nottingham - Mansfield Road - Sherwood - Arnold - Calverton - (Oxton & Epperstone at peak times)

Nottingham City Transport 61: Nottingham - Woodborough Road - Mapperley - Mapperley Plains - Lambley - Woodborough - Calverton

== Education ==
After year six, most pupils at Lambley Primary School transfer for secondary education to Colonel Frank Seely Academy in Calverton. The most recent Ofsted report for Lambley Primary, in January 2014, rated it Good for pupil achievement, teaching quality, pupil behaviour and safety, and leadership and management. It had 109 pupils aged 4–11 at the time. The school has a website.

== Amenities ==
Businesses in Lambley include a general store and others dealing with the motor trade, skiing equipment, bars and catering, accountancy, architecture, horticultural nursery, boarding kennels and caravan storage. There are three pubs: the Woodlark Inn, the Robin Hood Inn and The Lambley.

A crematorium, the fourth in Nottinghamshire, opened in 2017.

== See also ==
- Listed buildings in Lambley, Nottinghamshire
