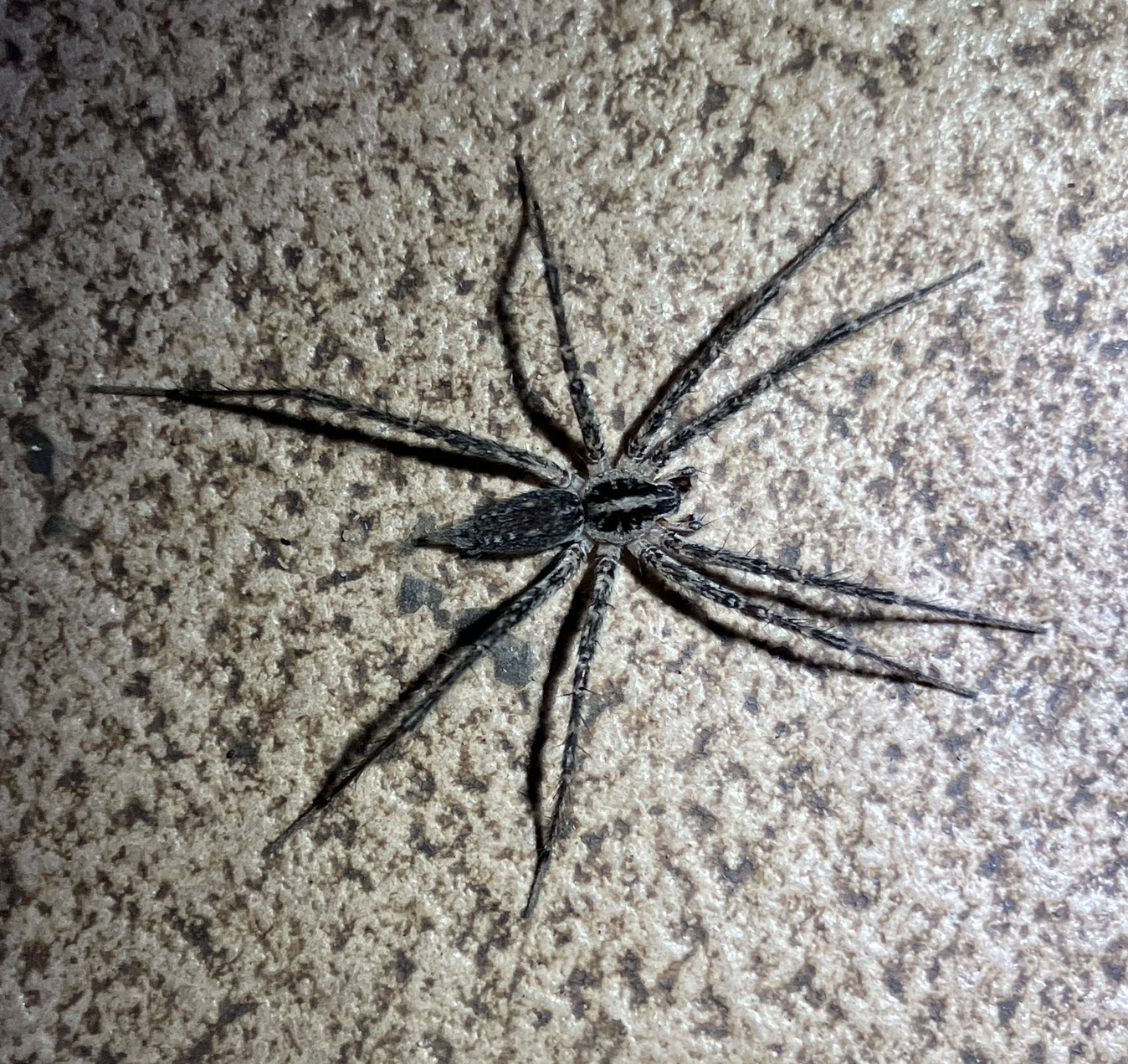

Scientific classification
- Kingdom: Animalia
- Phylum: Arthropoda
- Subphylum: Chelicerata
- Class: Arachnida
- Order: Araneae
- Infraorder: Araneomorphae
- Family: Agelenidae
- Genus: Benoitia
- Species: B. raymondeae

Binomial name
- Benoitia raymondeae (Lessert, 1915)

Synonyms
- Agelena raymondeae Lessert, 1915; Benoitia raymondae Lehtinen, 1967; Agelena raymondae Lehtinen, 1967

= Benoitia raymondeae =

Raymond's funnel-web spider

Species of spider

Benoitia raymondeae is a species of spider in the family Agelenidae (funnel-web spiders). Commonly known as Raymond's funnel-web spider, it is endemic to Africa, where it occurs in Kenya, Tanzania, and South Africa.

== Taxonomy ==
The species was originally described by Roger de Lessert in 1915 as Agelena raymondeae based on specimens from Mount Kilimanjaro and Mount Meru in Tanzania. In 1967, Pekka T. Lehtinen transferred the species to the genus Benoitia, though he initially misspelled the specific name as "raymondae".

== Distribution ==
Benoitia raymondeae has been recorded from Kenya, Tanzania, and South Africa. In South Africa, the species has been documented from six provinces, at elevations ranging from 62 to 1,758 meters above sea level. Specific localities include the Eastern Cape (Baviaanskloof Nature Reserve), Gauteng (Roodepoort, Baviaanspoort), Limpopo (Modimolle), North West (Buffelspoort), Mpumalanga (Bethal), and the Western Cape (Karoo National Park, Hermanus).

== Habitat ==
Benoitia raymondeae is a web-dwelling species that constructs funnel webs in low vegetation close to the soil surface. The species has been sampled from multiple South African biomes, including Fynbos, Grassland, Savanna, Succulent Karoo, and Thicket biomes.

== Description ==
The original description by Lessert provides details of the female specimen. The cephalothorax is testaceous (yellowish-brown) with two longitudinal blackish median bands that are attenuated and reach the posterior lateral eyes, converging at the level of the thoracic groove. The cephalic region is tinted blackish in front, with a blackish ocular area and a blackish marginal line on the thoracic region.

The chelicerae are brownish-red, while the labium is blackish and light-colored at the tip. The sternum is blackish, marked with a fairly broad median longitudinal spot that is diffuse and testaceous. The pedipalps are yellowish-red, decorated with small blackish rings on the femora, patellae, and tibiae.

The legs are yellowish-red with interrupted blackish rings, particularly distinct on the undersides of the femora. The femora bear a submedian white-testaceous ring, and the tibiae have a basal and submedian white-testaceous ring.

The opisthosoma is greyish-testaceous with black spots forming a border along a median band. The median band itself is greyish-testaceous, tinted reddish in front and slightly dentate, marked with two lateral curved lines followed by two white-testaceous spots, and posteriorly with two marginal series of three white points. The spinnerets are yellowish-red.

== Conservation status ==
Benoitia raymondeae is classified as Least Concern by the South African National Biodiversity Institute due to its wide geographical range across Africa. The species is protected within the Baviaanskloof Nature Reserve and Karoo National Park in South Africa. No known threats have been identified, and no specific conservation actions are currently recommended.
