= Holy Trinity Church, Lambley =

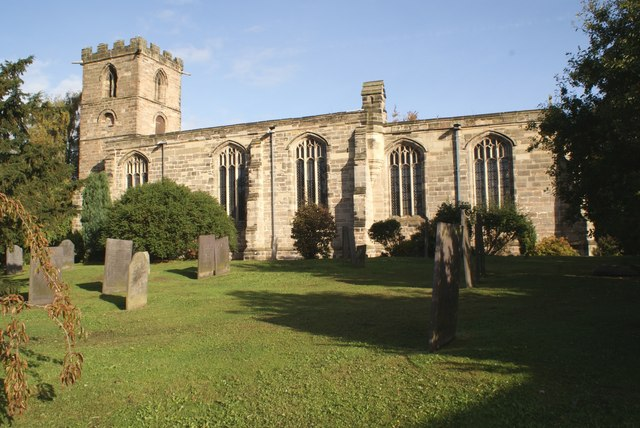
- Holy Trinity Church, Lambley
- Holy Trinity Church, Lambley
- 53°0′8.92″N 1°3′39.14″W
- OS grid reference: SK 63120 45435
- Location: Lambley, Nottinghamshire
- Country: England
- Denomination: Church of England

History
- Dedication: Holy Trinity

Architecture
- Heritage designation: Grade I listed

Administration
- Diocese: Diocese of Southwell and Nottingham
- Archdeaconry: Nottingham
- Deanery: Gedling
- Parish: Lambley

Holy Trinity Church, Lambley is a Grade I listed parish church in the Church of England in Lambley, Nottinghamshire.

== History ==
The church originally dates from the 11th century, though it is unrecorded in the Domesday survey of 1086. One of the earliest written references to the church is a papal Taxatio of 1291. The tower (with round-headed arch into the nave) survives from the 13th and 14th centuries, and other pre-15th century fragments include various doors, piscinae and stained glass. The heavily-restored screen also survives from 1377. Ralph de Cromwell, 1st Baron Cromwell founded a chantry at the church in 1340, on the site of the modern vestry. The church was largely rebuilt around 1470 as the result of a bequest by Ralph Cromwell, Lord Treasurer (Ralph de Cromwell's son). His badge of a bulging purse is carved beside the east window, and the well-windowed nave and chancel are largely the result of this building campaign. The church was dedicated by William, Bishop of Dromore in 1480.

It has a single bell. Inside the church is a Jacobean rood screen. On the outer walls can be seen numerous grooves where arrows were sharpened during the middle ages, as archery was practiced in the churchyard.

== Burials ==
- Ralph de Cromwell, 1st Baron Cromwell (d.1398).

== See also ==
- Grade I listed buildings in Nottinghamshire
- Listed buildings in Lambley, Nottinghamshire
