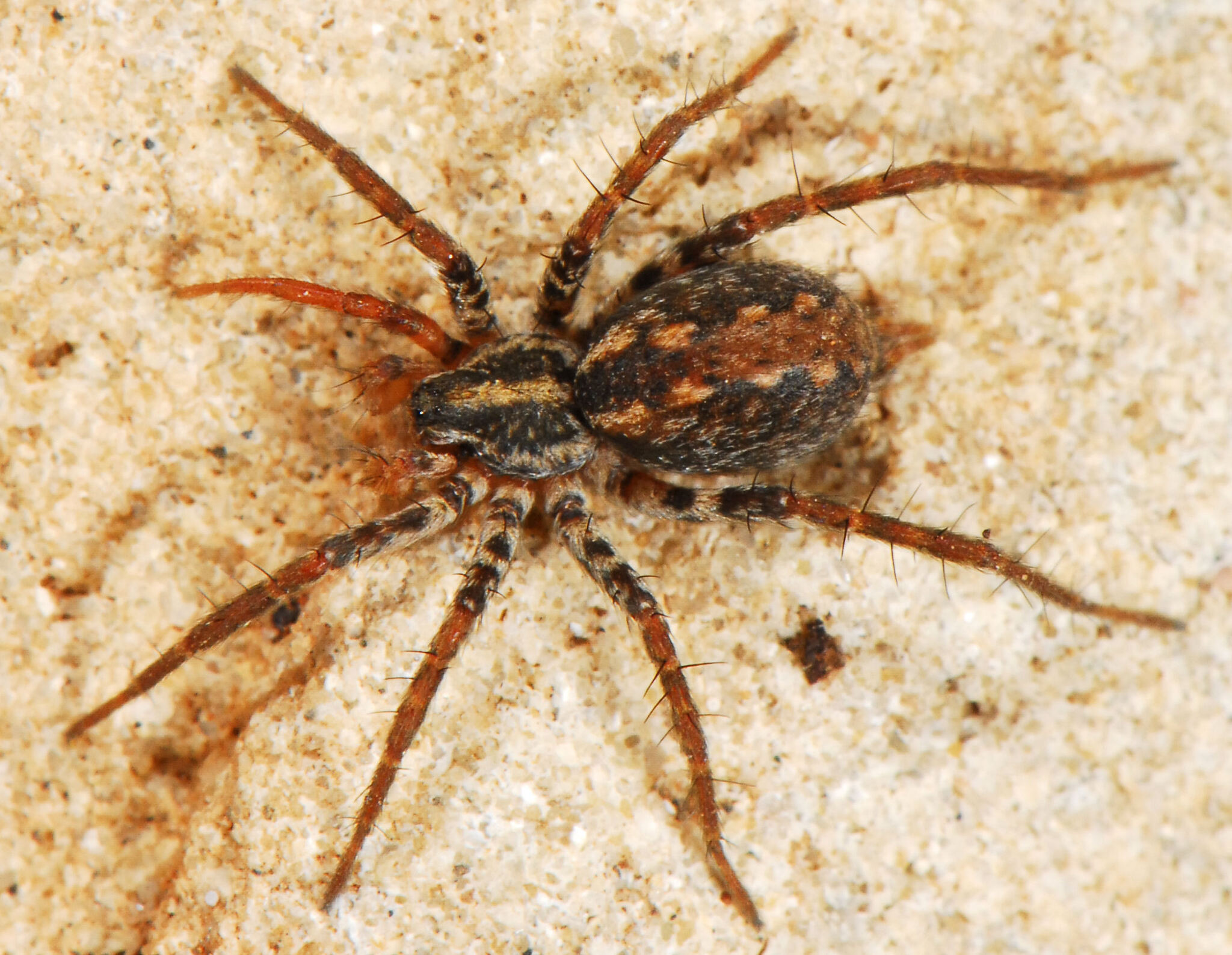
- female
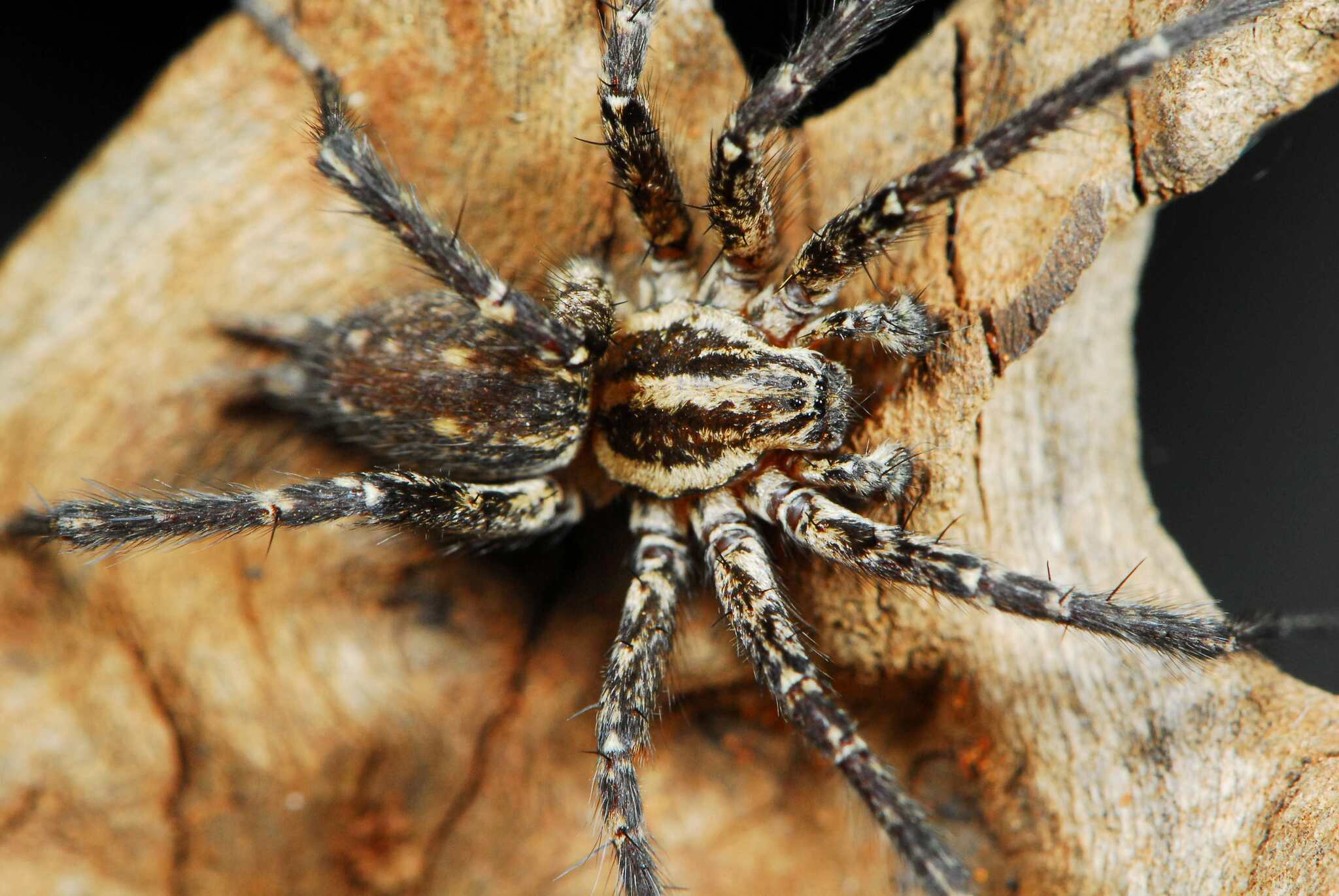
- male

Conservation status
- Least Concern (IUCN 3.1)

Scientific classification
- Kingdom: Animalia
- Phylum: Arthropoda
- Subphylum: Chelicerata
- Class: Arachnida
- Order: Araneae
- Infraorder: Araneomorphae
- Family: Agelenidae
- Genus: Benoitia
- Species: B. ocellata

Binomial name
- Benoitia ocellata (Pocock, 1900)

Synonyms
- Agelena ocellata Pocock, 1900; Olorunia ocellata (Pocock, 1900)

= Benoitia ocellata =

Species of funnel-web spider

Benoitia ocellata is a species of funnel-web spider in the family Agelenidae. Known as the Benoitia funnel-web spider, it is endemic to southern and eastern Africa, where it has been recorded from Kenya, Namibia, Botswana, and South Africa.

The specific epithet ocellata refers to the eye-like spots present on the spider's opisthosoma.

== Taxonomy ==
The species was originally described by Reginald Innes Pocock in 1900 as Agelena ocellata, based on specimens collected from Table Mountain in South Africa. The species was subsequently transferred to the genus Olorunia by Lehtinen in 1967, and later moved to its current placement in Benoitia by Levy in 1996.

== Distribution ==
Benoitia ocellata has been recorded from four African countries: Kenya, Namibia, Botswana, and South Africa. In South Africa, the species occurs across all nine provinces and has been documented from 17 protected areas. The species has been found at elevations ranging from 9 to 1,758 metres above sea level.

Notable localities include Mountain Zebra National Park, Addo Elephant National Park, Kruger National Park, and Table Mountain National Park.

== Habitat ==
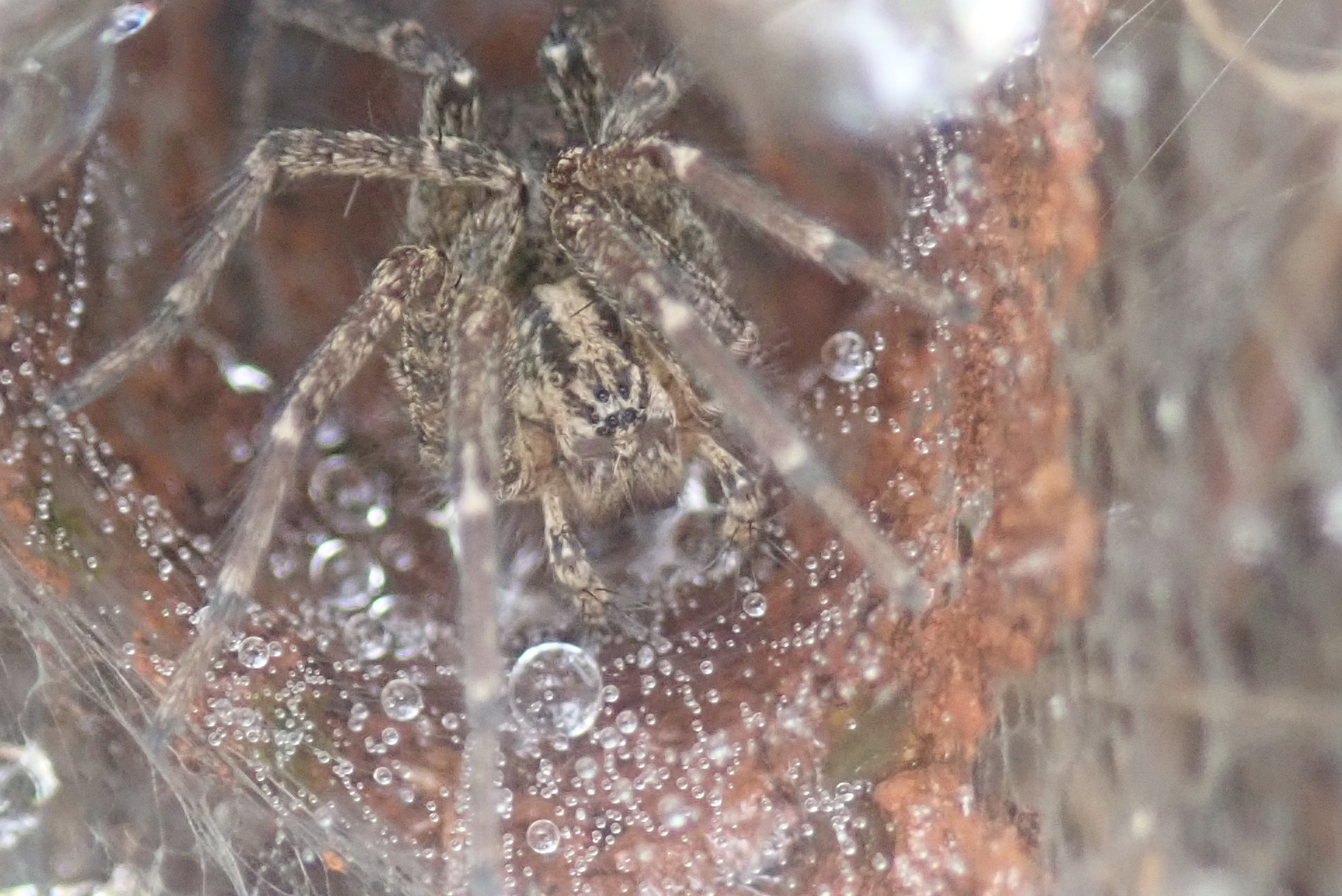
in web

Benoitia ocellata is a web-dwelling species that constructs characteristic funnel-webs in low vegetation close to the soil surface. The species is particularly associated with abandoned mammal burrows in South African savanna environments, where it was found in approximately half of 320 surveyed burrows. More than one-third of occupied burrows contained multiple individuals, and about one-eighth were shared with spiders from the families Pholcidae or Pisauridae.

The sheet-web is typically positioned in the centre of a burrow, with an open-ended silk funnel leading to the side wall, allowing the spider to escape into small crevices when disturbed. Web height varies considerably, ranging from 5 to 81 cm above the burrow floor.

== Description ==
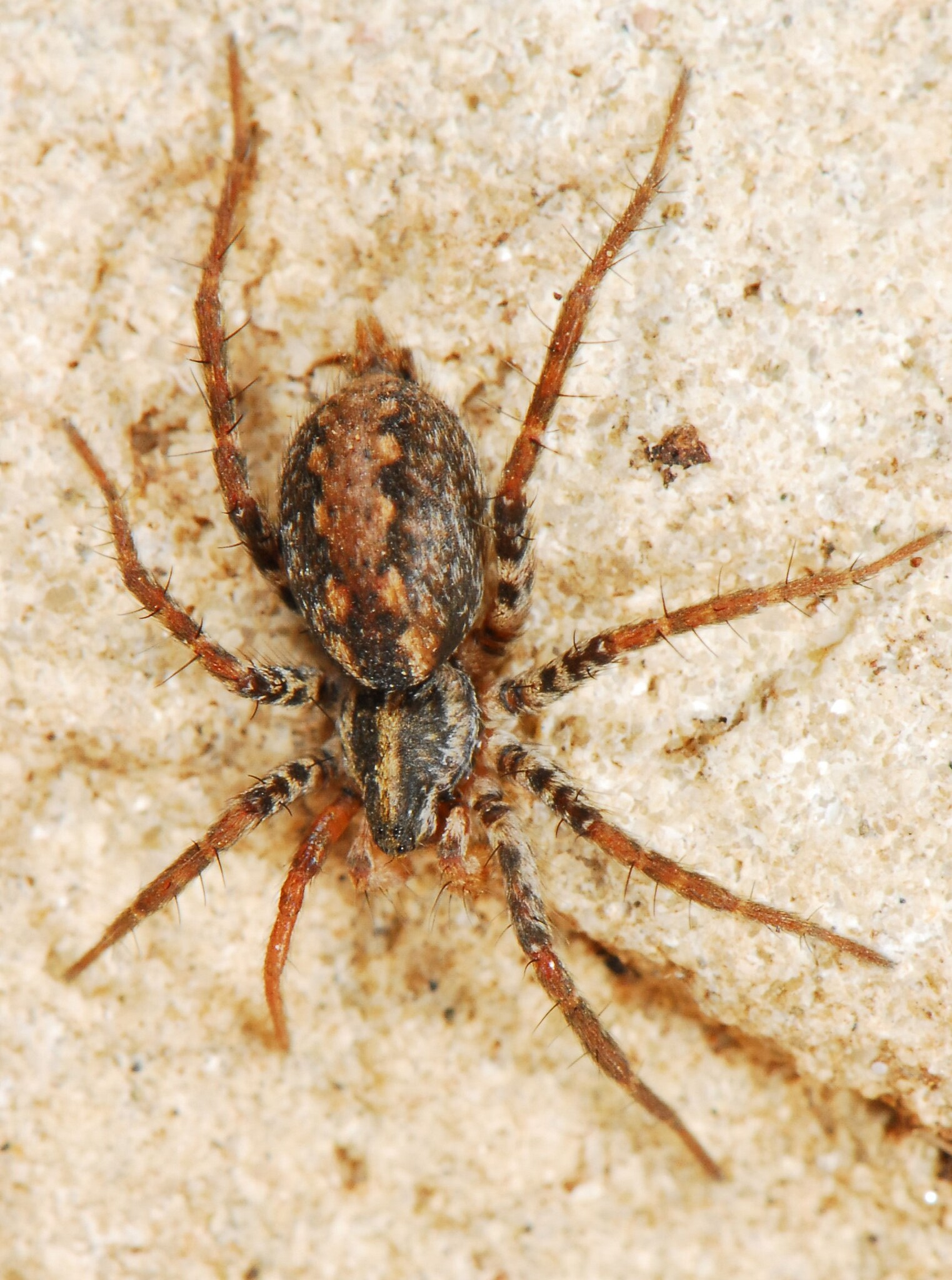
female

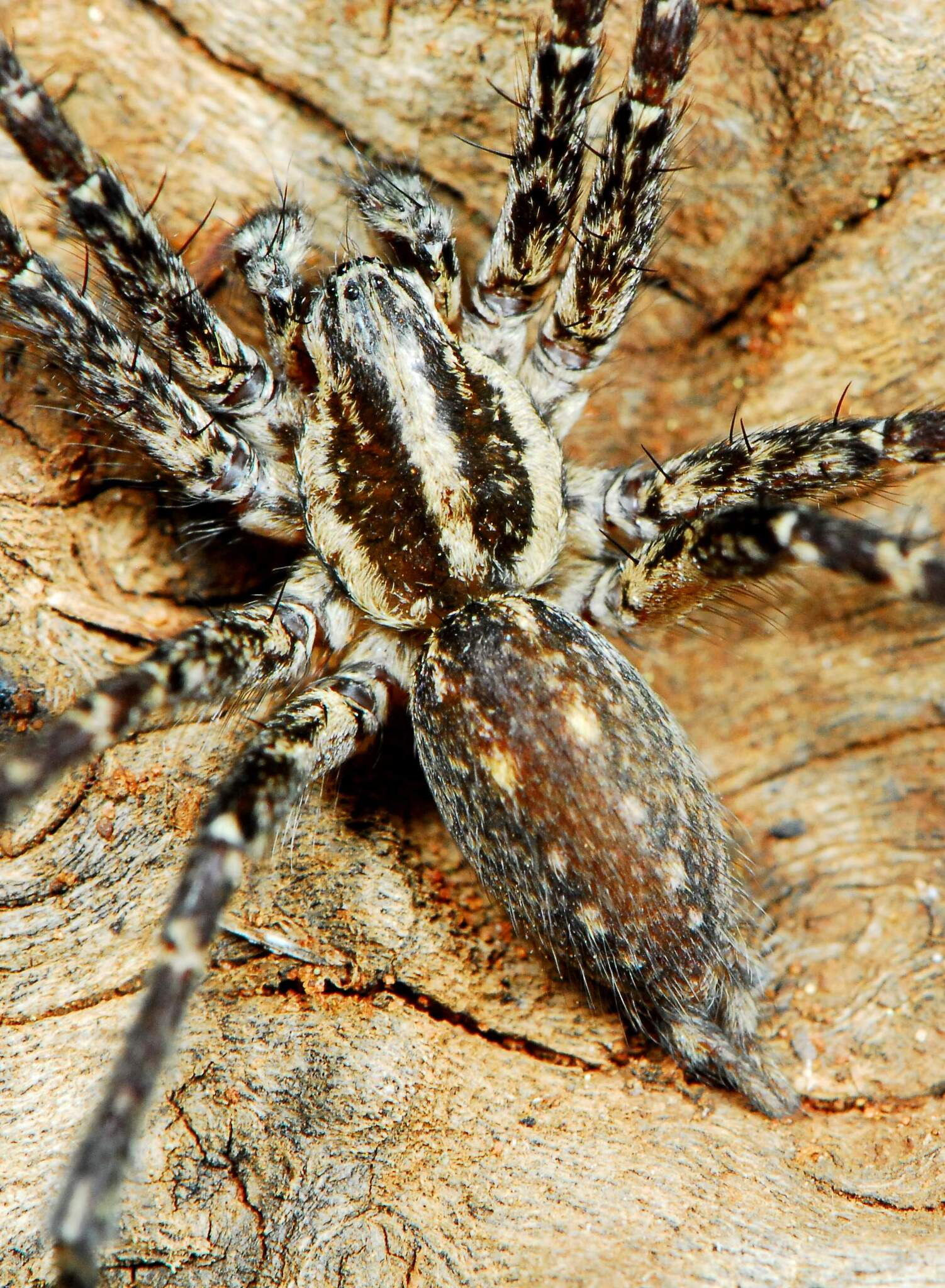
male

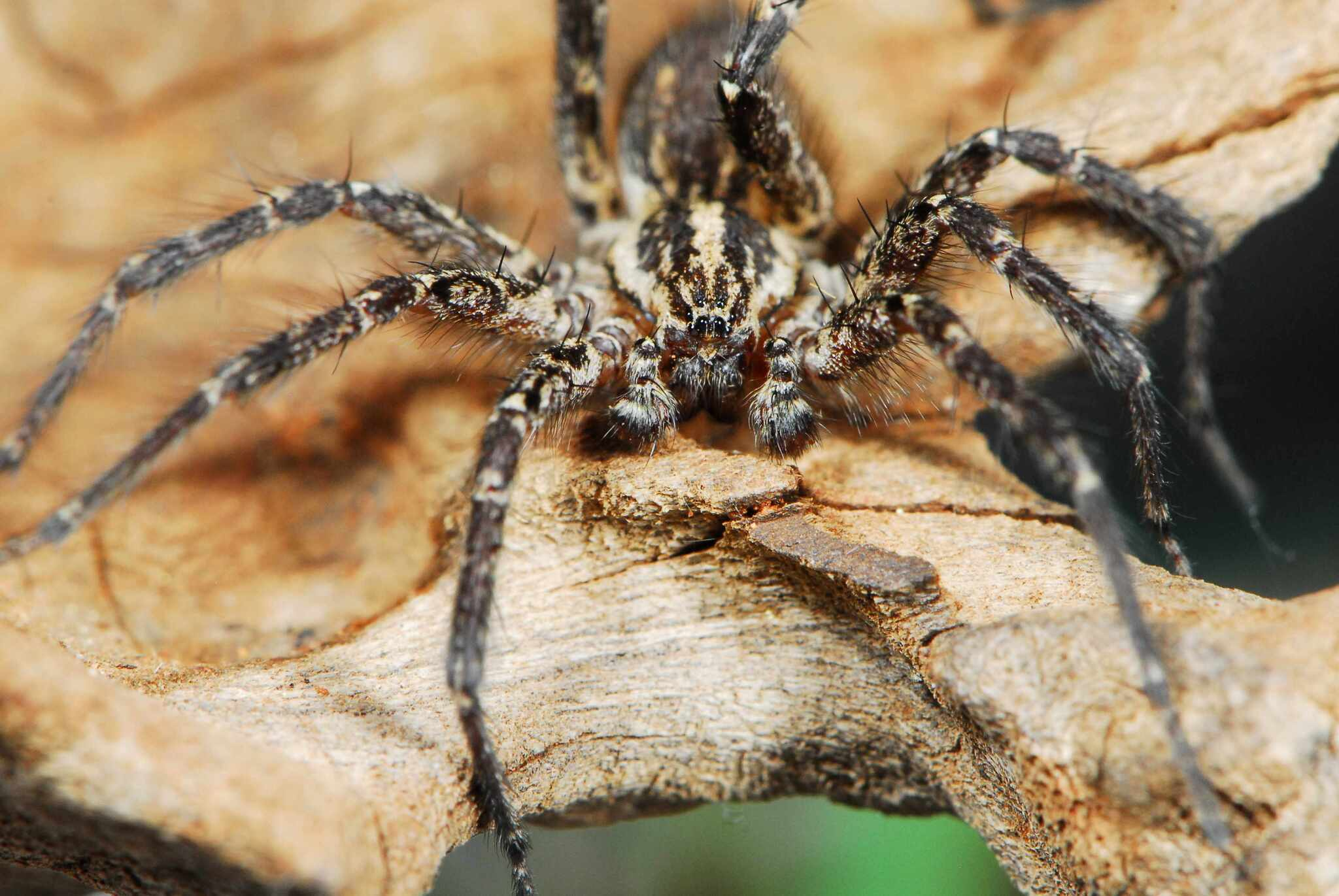
male

Benoitia ocellata exhibits sexual dimorphism typical of many spider species. Females have a total body length of 7 mm. The female's coloration is predominantly ochre-brown, with the carapace featuring broad median and lateral white bands. The legs display white hairs with distinctly banded femora, while the sternum has a pale median stripe. The opisthosoma is particularly distinctive, ornamented with a pair of bright yellow spots, black spots arranged in two longitudinal lines, and small dark spots on the sides.

Males are smaller than females, with a total body length of 6 millimetres, a cephalothorax of 3 millimetres, and notably longer legs (first leg 13 millimetres). The male pedipalps are diagnostic, with a short patella armed externally with two short processes, and a tibia shorter than the patella but equipped with a slender tooth-like process.

The arrangement of the eyes is characteristic of the family, with the anterior median eyes slightly longer than the lateral eyes. The female reproductive structures include a pair of obliquely oval pits separated by a broad, posteriorly projecting partition.

== Ecology ==
The species' diet consists primarily of jumping or climbing insects such as grasshoppers, large ant species, and beetles. Most prey items are relatively large, often exceeding the spider's own body length. Kleptoparasitic ants have been observed stealing prey items from the webs.

Benoitia ocellata has been collected from most South African floral biomes, with the exception of arid regions. The species has also been recorded from agricultural environments, including maize fields in the North West Province.

== Conservation status ==
The species is classified as Least Concern due to its wide geographical distribution across southern and eastern Africa. It is protected within numerous conservation areas, including national parks and nature reserves across South Africa. No specific conservation actions are currently recommended for this species.
