= Markus Piispanen =

Finnish ice hockey winger

- Born: May 29, 1989 (age 35); Jyväskylä, Finland
- Height: 5 ft 10 in (178 cm)
- Weight: 181 lb (82 kg; 12 st 13 lb)
- Position: Winger
- Shoots: Right
- 2. Divisioona team; Former teams: Virkiä; Kärpät
- Playing career: 2010–present

Markus Piispanen (born May 29, 1989) is a Finnish professional ice hockey winger currently playing for Virkiä of the 2. Divisioona.

Piispanen played 12 games for Kärpät during the 2015–16 Liiga season and scored one assist. He also played in Mestis for Sport, Hokki and Espoo United.

He is the younger brother of Arsi Piispanen who was drafted by the Columbus Blue Jackets in 2003 and currently plays for IK Oskarshamn of the Swedish Hockey League.
