= Lehti =

Lehti is a Finnish surname of Laine type literally meaning "leaf". It may refer to:

- Alexandra Lehti (born 1996), Finnish singer, known as Lxandra
- Eero Lehti (born 1944), Finnish businessman
- Martti Lehti (1901-1961), Finnish writer
- Olavi Lehti (1914-1993), Finnish general

== See also ==
- Lehtinen, the corresponding Virtanen type surname
