= Matti Lamberg =

Finnish ice hockey player

- Born: January 6, 1993 (age 33) Kiiminki, Finland
- Height: 5 ft 11 in (180 cm)
- Weight: 165 lb (75 kg; 11 st 11 lb)
- Position: Right wing
- Shot: Right
- Played for: Kiekko-Laser; Jokerit; Kiekko-Vantaa; HIFK; Espoo United; Vaasan Sport; Porin Ässät
- Playing career: 2010–2019

Matti Mounir Lamberg (born January 6, 1993) is a Finnish former ice hockey player who last played for Porin Ässät in the Finnish SM-liiga. He is now a scout for the Washington Capitals.

Lamberg made his SM-liiga debut playing with Jokerit during the 2012–13 SM-liiga season.

== Personal life ==
Lamberg is of Moroccan-Berber descent through his father.

== Career statistics ==
			Regular season					Playoffs
Season	Team	League	GP	G	A	Pts	PIM	GP	G	A	Pts	PIM
2007–08	Oulun Kärpät U16	U16 SM-sarja Q	2	0	0	0	0	—	—	—	—	—
2007–08	Oulun Kärpät U16	U16 SM-sarja	—	—	—	—	—	—	—	—	—	—
2008–09	Oulun Kärpät U16	U16 SM-sarja Q	5	3	1	4	2	—	—	—	—	—
2008–09	Oulun Kärpät U16	U16 SM-sarja	21	7	6	13	12	1	0	1	1	0
2009–10	Kiekko-Laser U18	U18 I-Divisioona	2	2	4	6	0	—	—	—	—	—
2009–10	Oulun Kärpät U18	U18 SM-sarja	16	3	1	4	4	4	1	0	1	0
2010–11	Oulun Kärpät U18	U18 SM-sarja Q	6	3	4	7	4	—	—	—	—	—
2010–11	Oulun Kärpät U18	U18 SM-sarja	5	4	4	8	6	9	4	1	5	10
2010–11	Oulun Kärpät U20	U20 SM-liiga	32	9	7	16	18	—	—	—	—	—
2010–11	Kiekko-Laser	Mestis	5	0	0	0	0	—	—	—	—	—
2011–12	Oulun Kärpät U20	U20 SM-liiga	44	6	8	14	63	3	0	0	0	2
2011–12	Kiekko-Laser	Mestis	—	—	—	—	—	—	—	—	—	—
2012–13	Jokerit U20	U20 SM-liiga	4	0	2	2	0	—	—	—	—	—
2012–13	Jokerit	SM-liiga	19	2	4	6	14	—	—	—	—	—
2012–13	Kiekko-Vantaa	Mestis	2	0	0	0	4	—	—	—	—	—
2013–14	Jokerit	Liiga	22	1	0	1	33	—	—	—	—	—
2013–14	Kiekko-Vantaa	Mestis	12	6	2	8	18	3	2	1	3	2
2014–15	HIFK	Liiga	13	3	3	6	8	—	—	—	—	—
2015–16	HIFK	Liiga	4	0	0	0	0	2	0	0	0	2
2015–16	Kiekko-Vantaa	Mestis	6	0	3	3	8	—	—	—	—	—
2016–17	Espoo United	Mestis	6	0	1	1	18	—	—	—	—	—
2016–17	Vaasan Sport	Liiga	34	4	3	7	59	—	—	—	—	—
2017–18	Porin Ässät	Liiga	32	2	2	4	58	7	0	0	0	16
2018–19	Porin Ässät	Liiga	8	0	0	0	2	—	—	—	—	—
Liiga totals			132	12	12	24	174	9	0	0	0	18
Mestis totals			31	6	6	12	48	3	2	1	3	2
