= Petri Pitkäjärvi =

Finnish ice hockey right winger

- Born: February 5, 1976 (age 49) Helsinki, Finland
- Height: 5 ft 9 in (175 cm)
- Weight: 176 lb (80 kg; 12 st 8 lb)
- Position: Right wing
- Shot: Right
- Played for: Jokerit; Kiekko-Vantaa
- Playing career: 1997–2008

Petri Pitkäjärvi (born February 5, 1976) is a Finnish former professional ice hockey right winger.

Pitkäjärvi played 36 games for Jokerit during the 1997–98 SM-liiga season, scoring no points. He then played in the I-Divisioona for Haukat before joining Kiekko-Vantaa in 2000 where he remained for the rest of his career until his retirement in 2008. His number 10 jersey is retired by Kiekko-Vantaa in his honour.
