= Brent Sikkema =

American art dealer (1948–2024)

Brent Fay Sikkema (August 13, 1948 – January 15, 2024) was an American art dealer. He was the co-founder of Sikkema Jenkins & Co, a Manhattan art gallery that represents artists including Kara Walker, Louis Fratino, Arturo Herrera, the estate of Tony Feher, Vik Muniz, and Jeffrey Gibson.

== Early life ==
Sikkema was born on August 13, 1948, in Morrison, Illinois, the younger of two children of Dwaine Louis Sikkema and Emily "Billie" (Howe) Sikkema. He attended the San Francisco Art Institute.

== Career ==
Sikkema began working with art in 1971 as the director of exhibitions at Visual Studies Workshop in Rochester, New York and opened his first gallery in 1976, in the city of Boston, Massachusetts. He was a partner in the art gallery Sikkema Jenkins & Co, in the Chelsea neighborhood of New York City. It was founded in 1991 by him as Wooster Gardens.

== Death ==
Murder of Brent Sikkema
- Location: Bedroom of the victim's winter home in Rio de Janeiro's Jardim Botanico district, Rio de Janeiro State, Brazil
- Date: January 15, 2024
- Target: Brent Sikkema, art dealer
- Attack type: Suspected murder for hire, stabbing
- Weapon: Knife (17 stab wounds)
- Deaths: 1
- Victim: Brent Sikkema
- No. of participants: 1
- Motive: Suspected child custody, life insurance, divorce proceedings
- Accused: Daniel Garcia Carrera Sikkema (victim's ex-husband), Alejandro Triana Prévez (suspected assaliant, former bodyguard)

Sikkema died on January 15, 2024, at the age of 75, after he was stabbed to death in his Rio de Janeiro townhouse. Two days later, 30-year-old Alejandro Triana Prevez was arrested as a suspect. Sikkema sustained eighteen stab wounds, most of them to the face and chest, and US$3,000 was stolen from his home. On February 9, Prevez told the police that Daniel Sikkema, the victim's ex-husband, promised him $200,000 to kill Brent. According to the investigation, Daniel's motivation was the dispute over millions of dollars from Brent's estate, who was a partner in an important art gallery in New York. The police investigation said that Sikkema changed his will in May 2022, and his ex-husband, Daniel, the alleged mastermind behind the American's murder, was no longer the beneficiary.

On March 21, Daniel was arrested for passport fraud in New York.

On July 1, the FBI joined the investigation and studied the crime scene in Jardim Botânico, alongside American prosecutors, Brazilian police officers from the Capital Homicide Division (DH) and members of the Federal Public Ministry (MPF).

On August 30, the defendants attended a hearing at the Court of Justice of Rio de Janeiro.

On February 11, 2025, the American police reported that they arrested and indicted Daniel Sikkema for the murder Brent Sikkema.

On May 22, 2026, a federal jury in the United States convicted Daniel for ordering the murder of the gallery owner who was stabbed to death in January 2024. The American justice system concluded that he conspired to plan and finance the murder of Brent.

== See also ==
- Murder of Stuart Rattle
