= Janne Puhakka =

Finnish ice hockey player (1995–2024)

- Born: 24 February 1995 Espoo, Finland
- Died: 13 October 2024 (aged 29) Espoo, Finland
- Height: 183 cm (6 ft 0 in)
- Weight: 82 kg (181 lb; 12 st 13 lb)
- Position: Left wing
- Shot: Left
- Played for: Espoo Blues; TUTO Hockey; Espoo United; Rapaces de Gap
- Playing career: 2015–2018

Janne Puhakka (24 February 1995 – 13 October 2024) was a Finnish ice hockey player who died at his home in October 2024; in 2025, his ex-boyfriend was found guilty of his murder.

== Biography ==
=== Ice hockey career ===
In Canada, he played for the Chicoutimi Saguenéens of the Quebec Major Junior Hockey League (QMJHL). Back home in Finland, he suited up for the Espoo Blues in the top-tier Liiga, as well as for TUTO Hockey and Espoo United in the Mestis league. Later in his career, he expanded his horizons further by joining Rapaces de Gap in France's Ligue Magnus. Beyond his achievements on the ice, Puhakka made headlines in 2019 when he courageously became the first professional ice hockey player from Finland to publicly come out as gay.

=== Reality television ===
In 2024, he appeared on Petolliset, the Finnish adaptation of the reality game show The Traitors. After his passing, the show's broadcaster, Nelonen Media, decided not to air the final episode on its originally scheduled date of 17 October. The network later announced that the finale would instead air on 10 November.

=== Death ===
Puhakka died at his residence in Espoo on 13 October 2024, at the age of 29. His former partner, Rolf Nordmo from Trøndelag, Norway, was later taken into custody as a suspect and eventually confessed to the killing. According to police interviews, the motive behind the crime was the breakup of their relationship. Puhakka had moved out of their shared home in Espoo a few weeks earlier but returned on 13 October to handle some "practical matters." On 1 April 2025, the Western Uusimaa District Court sentenced Nordmo to life in prison for Puhakka's murder.

Puhakka was laid to rest during a funeral service held in Espoo on 8 November 2024.
