= Kalle Lehtinen =

Finnish footballer (born 1968)

Personal information
- Date of birth: 12 October 1968 (age 58)
- Place of birth: Helsinki
- Position: Midfielder

Senior career*
Years	Team	Apps	(Gls)
1986–1987	FC Kontu		
1988–1989	FC Kuusysi		
1989–1991	FC Locarno		
1991–1993	FC Kuusysi		
1994–1995	FinnPa		
1996–1997	HJK		
1998	Pallokerho-35		
1999	FC Jokerit		
1999	FinnPa		

International career
- Finland u-21

Managerial career
- 2012: Klubi 04 (assistant)
- * Club domestic league appearances and goals

Kalle Lehtinen (born 12 October 1968) is a retired Finnish football midfielder.

He is the father of Alex Lehtinen.
