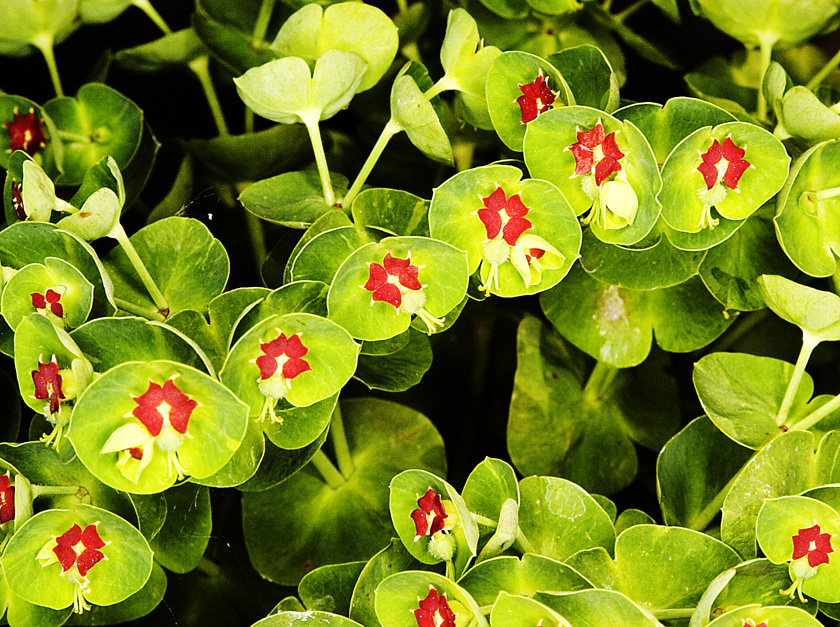

Scientific classification
- Kingdom: Plantae
- Clade: Tracheophytes
- Clade: Angiosperms
- Clade: Eudicots
- Clade: Rosids
- Order: Malpighiales
- Family: Euphorbiaceae
- Genus: Euphorbia
- Species: E. × martini

Binomial name
- Euphorbia × martini Rouy

= Euphorbia × martini =

Species of flowering plant

Euphorbia × martini, or Martin's spurge, is a hybrid between two species of flowering plant, E. amygdaloides × E. characias subsp. characias in the spurge family Euphorbiaceae. It was found growing wild in southern France. Growing to 60 cm (24 in) tall and broad, it is a dwarf evergreen subshrub with narrow grey-green leaves and in late spring and early summer, sprays of lime green flowers, often with a red or maroon eye. It is useful as a spreading, weed-smothering groundcover. Though hardy down to −15 °C (5 °F), it is a Mediterranean plant best grown in a sheltered spot in well-drained soil in full sun.

All parts of the plant are toxic if eaten, moreover euphorbias produce an irritant milky sap when cut or broken.

Numerous cultivars have been developed for garden use, of which the following have gained the Royal Horticultural Society's Award of Garden Merit:-

- 'Ascot Rainbow'
- 'Helen Robinson'
