= Alex Lehtinen =

Finnish-Swiss footballer (born 1996)

Personal information
- Date of birth: 9 April 1996 (age 30)
- Place of birth: Helsinki, Finland
- Height: 1.79 m (5 ft 10 1/2 in)
- Position: Defender

Team information
- Current team: IF Gnistan
- Number: 3

Youth career
- –2011: FC Honka
- 2012–2015: HJK Helsinki

College career
Years	Team	Apps	(Gls)
2016–2017	Butler Bulldogs	37	(2)

Senior career*
Years	Team	Apps	(Gls)
2012–2015	Klubi 04	46	(2)
2014–2015	HJK Helsinki	12	(0)
2015–2016	FC Honka	6	(0)
2017–	IF Gnistan	7	(0)

International career^{‡}
2012–2013	Finland U17	9	(1)
2013–2014	Finland U18	8	(1)
2012–2014	Finland U19	8	(0)
2014	Switzerland U18	1	(0)
2014	Finland U20	1	(0)
- * Club domestic league appearances and goals as of 11:55, 11 June 2018 (UTC) ‡ National team caps and goals as of 11:55, 11 June 2018 (UTC)

Alex Lehtinen (born 9 April 1996) is a Finnish-Swiss footballer who plays as a defender for IF Gnistan.

== International career ==
Lehtinen has played at international level for Finland from under-15 to under-20 level, but was called up by Switzerland's under-18 set up in 2014. He played once, in a friendly against Italy.

== Career statistics ==
As of match played 11 June 2018.

Club	Season	League			Finnish Cup		League Cup		Other		Total	
Club	Season	Division	Apps	Goals	Apps	Goals	Apps	Goals	Apps	Goals	Apps	Goals
Klubi 04	2012	Kakkonen	8	0	0	0	0	0	0	0	8	0
Klubi 04	2013	Kakkonen	22	0	0	0	0	0	0	0	22	0
Klubi 04	2014	Kakkonen	14	2	0	0	0	0	0	0	14	2
Klubi 04	2015	Kakkonen	2	0	0	0	0	0	0	0	2	0
Klubi 04	Total		46	2	0	0	0	0	0	0	46	2
HJK Helsinki	2014	Veikkausliiga	7	0	0	0	2	0	0	0	9	0
HJK Helsinki	2015	Veikkausliiga	5	0	2	0	4	0	1 (Note: Appearances in UEFA Europa League qualifying)	0	12	0
HJK Helsinki	Total		12	0	2	0	6	0	1	0	21	0
FC Honka	2015	Kakkonen	6	0	0	0	0	0	0	0	6	0
IF Gnistan	2017	Ykkönen	6	0	0	0	0	0	0	0	6	0
IF Gnistan	2018	Kakkonen	1	0	0	0	0	0	0	0	1	0
IF Gnistan	Total		7	0	0	0	0	0	0	0	7	0
Career total			71	0	2	0	6	0	1	0	80	2

== Personal life ==
A dual citizen of Finland and Switzerland, Lehtinen was born to a Finnish father and Swiss mother in Finland, where he has lived most of his life. His father, Kalle Lehtinen, is a former footballer.
