= Eric Martin (Essex cricketer) =

English cricketer (1907–??)

Eric Martin (born 4 February 1907) was an English cricketer. He was a right-handed batsman and a right-arm medium-pace bowler who played first-class cricket in 1928. He was born in Rock Ferry.

Martin made two first-class appearances for Essex during July 1928, the first of which saw him take the wicket of two-time Test cricketer Charlie Hallows — and the second, that of Percy Holmes. Martin made only small contributions with the bat, however, and was dropped from the team after his second game.
