= Eric Martin (lacrosse) =

American lacrosse player (born 1981)

Personal information
- Nickname: Meat
- Nationality: American
- Born: November 12, 1981 (age 44) Norfolk, Virginia, U.S.
- Height: 6 ft 2 in (188 cm)
- Weight: 220 lb (100 kg; 15 st 10 lb)

Sport
- Position: Defense
- Shoots: Left
- NLL draft: 12th overall, 2004; San Jose Stealth
- NLL team: Washington Stealth
- MLL team Former teams: Denver Outlaws; San Francisco Dragons
- Pro career: 2005–

Eric Martin (born November 12, 1981, in Norfolk, Virginia) is a professional lacrosse defenseman for the Washington Stealth of the National Lacrosse League and Denver Outlaws of the Major League Lacrosse.

Martin started playing field lacrosse in his high school freshman year in Virginia Beach at Norfolk Academy, and continued as a walk-on for the top ranked DIII Salisbury State University (MD) Seagulls. Eric won 2 National Championships at Salisbury, was a 2x All-American, 2x Defender of the Year, and was selected as the DIII Overall Player of the Year. Martin played 4 years at Salisbury where he had an exceptional career. A two time 1st Team All American, Martin was selected as the Division III National Player of the Year as a Senior and was named the Division III Defenseman of the Year in both his Junior and Senior years. He was the Capital Athletic Conference Player of the Year in 2004 and was named to the All Conference Team in 2002, 2003 and 2004. Coming out of college Martin was drafted by the MLL’s Rochester Rattlers, as well as the NLL’s San Jose Stealth. He was head coach of the boys Varsity lacrosse team at Branson Prep High School in Marin, California.

== NLL career ==
In the 2008 NLL season with the San Jose Stealth, Martin earned a spot among Inside Lacrosse's NLL Insider top 10 players of the year. He was voted as the league's second overall defender, almost becoming the only non-Canadian player to win the NLL Defensive Player of the Year award. Martin has 4 years of experience playing with the Stealth, and has 1 year experience playing semi-pro for the Victoria Shamrocks in Canada's Western Lacrosse Association. As a professional player, Martin registered 326 loose balls in the last three seasons for the National Lacrosse League Stealth, and he led the Major League Lacrosse Dragons in ground balls in 2006.

== MLL career ==
2004 Season (Rochester Rattlers): Martin played in 6 games recording 12 groundballs.

2005 Season (Rochester Rattlers): He played in 12 games, starting in 7. Scored 1 goal on the year while recording 49 groundballs.

2006 Season (San Francisco Dragons): Martin was acquired by the San Francisco Dragons April 21, 2006, from Rochester in a six team trade. He had a breakout season playing in all 12 games. He was named to the MLL ALL PRO Team. He led the team with 55 groundballs, while scoring 4 goals (one two pointer) and added 2 assists. He scored 1 assist and had 6 groundballs on 5/28 vs Denver, scored the game tying goal late in the game on 7/1 vs New Jersey and added 5 groundballs. He recorded a two-point goal on 7/22 at Los Angeles. He recorded 6 groundballs vs Denver in the semifinals of the New Balance Championship Weekend.

2007 Season (San Francisco Dragons): Martin played in 12 games scoring 6 goals (2 – 2point), 1 assist good for 9 points on the season. His 65 groundballs led the team. He was selected to the MLL All Star Game. He was named the MLL Defensive Player of the Week after scoring 1 goal (2 pointer) and grabbing 9 groundballs on 6/10 at Chicago. He scored 2 goals and added an assist with 9 groundballs on 8/11 vs Denver; recorded 8 groundballs on 7/28 at Los Angeles; had 1 goal and 1 assist on 5/19 vs Denver; 1 goal on 6/30 vs Los Angeles; and 1 goal on 8/5 at Chicago.

2008 Season (San Francisco Dragons): Martin served as a Co - Captain. He was selected to the Western Conference All Star Team and scored 4 goals in the game. He appeared in 12 games scoring 3 goals and adding 3 assists for 6 points. His 53 groundballs were 2nd on the team to Greg Gurenlian. He scored 1 goal and added 5 groundballs on 6/28 vs Boston; scored 1 goal and had 6 groundballs on 7/12 vs Chicago; and had 1 goal and 4 groundballs at Long Island on 7/26. He had an assist and 6 groundballs on 5/18 at Chicago and also had assists on 6/14 at Denver and 6/21 at New Jersey. He recorded 7 groundballs on 7/4 at Denver and again on 7/19 vs Denver.

== Statistics ==
=== NLL ===
		Regular Season						Playoffs
Season	Team	GP	G	A	Pts	LB	PIM	GP	G	A	Pts	LB	PIM
2005	San Jose	16	0	3	3	82	38	--	--	--	--	--	--
2006	San Jose	15	1	11	12	112	37	--	--	--	--	--	--
2007	San Jose	16	0	14	14	132	46	2	0	2	2	19	8
2008	San Jose	16	9	10	19	151	71	1	0	0	0	7	0
2009	San Jose	12	6	12	18	100	89	2	2	3	5	24	2
NLL totals		75	16	50	66	495	281	5	2	5	7	50	10
