= J. K. Lehtinen =

Finnish journalist and politician (1883–1937)

Juho (Jussi, J. K.) Kustaa Lehtinen (22 October 1883 – 15 November 1937) was a Finnish journalist and politician, born in Eräjärvi. He was a member of the Parliament of Finland from 1916 to 1917, representing the Social Democratic Party of Finland (SDP). He participated in the Finnish Civil War of 1918 on the Red side. After the defeat of the revolutionary forces, Lehtinen fled to Soviet Russia, where he joined the Communist Party of Finland (SKP), founded in Moscow by political exiles on 29 August 1918. Lehtinen stayed in the Soviet Union and found work as a teacher in the Communist University of the National Minorities of the West. He perished in the Great Purge in 1937.
