= Samuli Rasilainen =

Finnish ice hockey player

- Born: 21 June 1996 (age 29) Oulu, Finland
- Height: 187 cm (6 ft 2 in)
- Weight: 91 kg (201 lb; 14 st 5 lb)
- Position: Goaltender
- Caught: Left
- Played for: Espoo Blues
- Playing career: 2015–2016

Samuli Rasilainen (born 21 June 1996) is a Finnish retired ice hockey goaltender who played for Espoo Blues of the Finnish Liiga.
