= Yrjö Lehtinen =

Finnish politician (1891–1945)

Yrjö Ilmari Lehtinen (11 June 1891 – 22 February 1945) was a Finnish politician, born in Turku. He was a member of the Parliament of Finland from 1927 to 1929, representing the Socialist Electoral Organisation of Workers and Smallholders. He was imprisoned briefly for political reasons in the 1930s for selling ball bearings to the British to aid in the opposition and the resistance to Hitler and growing Nazi influence. Yrjo Lehtinen, Church of Finland Lutheran and later Theosophist, was an inventor and industrialist and manufacturer of chain saws and ball bearings, and later in his life worked for Helvar as a supervising director in radio transmission technology in Helsinki, when he died unexpectedly in 1945.

The younger brother of renowned fine artist Urho Lehtinen (1887-1982) of Yvaskyla, Yrjo was the second son of Juha Lehtinen and Maria Palmquist Lehtinen of Turku, Helsinki, and Yvaskyla.

Originally married to Selma Karolina Torniainen (1895-1973) from 1916 to 1930, they had three young children, Osmo Ilmari Lehtinen (1917-1994), Elo Lehtinen (1919-1991) and Marja Terttu (1927-1957). Selma Lehtinen divorced Yrjo Lehtinen when their children were 13, 11, and 3, due to political and religious differences with her husband and a separation of the three prior years. Her Torniainen parents were Lutheran educators, theologians and Agrarians who taught on Lautasaari. She remained single and raised and educated her children as Lutherans and cut ties with her former husband, who later remarried Aino, a journalist, reporters' union leader, and newspaper editor later in his life, who survived him by several decades until her death. Aino and Yrjo Lehtinen had no children.
