= Juha Tarkkanen =

Finnish ice hockey player

- Born: July 10, 1993 (age 32) Helsinki, Finland
- Height: 6 ft 2 in (188 cm)
- Weight: 196 lb (89 kg; 14 st 0 lb)
- Position: Defence
- Shoots: Left
- Ligue Magnus team Former teams: Anglet Hormadi Élite; HIFK; KalPa; Sport; Aigles de Nice
- NHL draft: Undrafted
- Playing career: 2013–present

Juha Tarkkanen (born July 10, 1993) is a Finnish ice hockey defenceman. He is currently playing with Anglet Hormadi Élite in the French Ligue Magnus.

Tarkkanen previously played in Liiga with HIFK, KalPa and Sport. On May 11, 2018, Tarkkanen moved to France and signed for Aigles de Nice of the Ligue Magnus. A year later on May 1, 2019, he joined fellow French side Anglet Hormadi Élite.
