= Eric Martin (Nottinghamshire cricketer) =

English cricketer

Personal information
- Full name: Eric James Martin
- Born: 17 August 1925; Lambley, Nottinghamshire, England
- Died: 1 October 2015 (aged 90); Woodthorpe, Nottinghamshire, England
- Batting: Right-handed
- Role: Batter

Domestic team information
- Years: Team
- 1949–1959: Nottinghamshire

Career statistics
Competition	First-class
Matches	125
Runs scored	4,086
Batting average	22.82
100s/50s	3/24
Top score	133*
Catches/stumpings	53/–
- Source: CricketArchive, 11 November 2024

Eric James Martin (17 August 1925 – 30 September 2015) played first-class cricket for Nottinghamshire between 1949 and 1959. He was born in Lambley, Nottinghamshire, and died in Woodthorpe, also in Nottinghamshire.

Martin was a right-handed opening batsman. He was a regular player in the Nottinghamshire side in 1952, 1954 and 1955. In 1954, he was awarded his county cap when he made 977 runs at an average of more than 30 runs per innings.
