= Paul Bangay =

Australian landscape designer

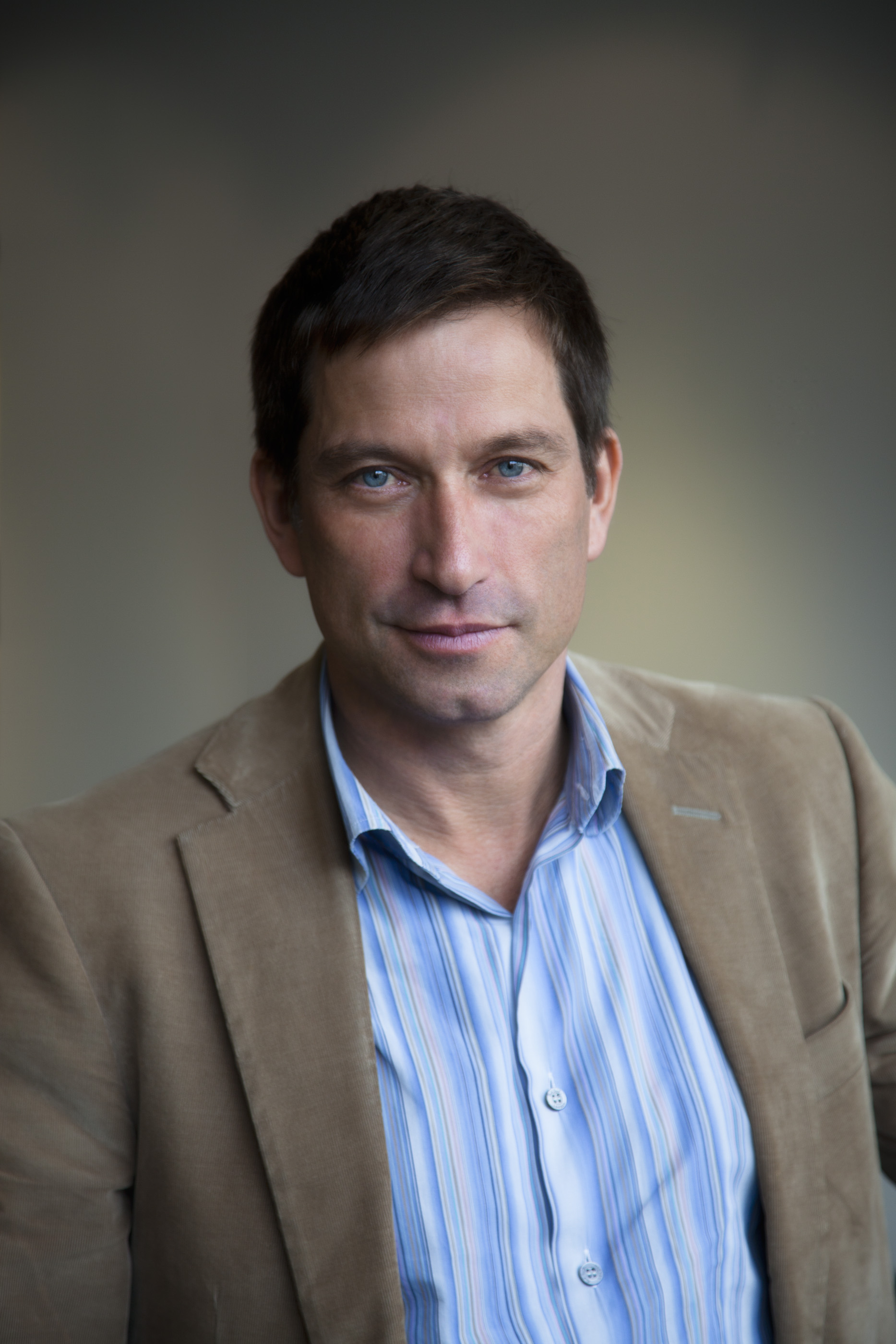
Bangay in 2010

Paul Robert Bangay is an Australian landscape designer. Bangay's designs have been noted for their "precise angles, perfect symmetry, strong sight lines and rich detail."

== Awards ==
In 2001, Bangay received the Centenary Medal for outstanding achievement for his role in designing and constructing the AIDS Memorial Garden at the Alfred Hospital. In the 2018 Australia Day Honours, he received the Medal of the Order of Australia, for service to landscape architecture.

== Published works ==
Bangay's published works include:

- The Defined Garden (1996)
- The Boxed Garden (1998)
- The Balanced Garden (2003)
- The Enchanted Garden (2005)
- Paul Bangay's Garden Design Handbook (2008)
- Paul Bangay's Guide to Plants (2011)
- The Garden at Stonefields (2013)
- Paul Bangay's Country Gardens (2016)
- Stonefields by the Seasons (2020)
- Paul Bangay – A Life In Garden Design (2023)

Bangay's books are accompanied with photographs by photographer Simon Griffiths.

Bangay's designs are featured in books and magazines, including:

- House and Garden Aus. May 2011
- Rural Australian Gardens by Myles Baldwin
- Kitchen Gardens of Australia by Kate Herd
- Hamptons Gardens by Jack Delashmet
