= Joel Lehtinen =

Finnish ice hockey player

- Born: November 16, 1991 (age 33); Helsinki, Finland
- Height: 6 ft 1 in (185 cm)
- Weight: 183 lb (83 kg; 13 st 1 lb)
- Position: Forward
- Shoots: Left
- Liiga team: HIFK
- NHL draft: Undrafted
- Playing career: 2013–present

Joel Lehtinen (born November 16, 1991) is a Finnish ice hockey player. He is currently playing with HIFK in the Finnish Liiga.

Lehtinen made his Liiga debut playing with HIFK during the 2013–14 Liiga season.
