= Niko Piiparinen =

Finnish ice hockey player

- Born: July 17, 1989 (age 36) Helsinki, Finland
- Height: 6 ft 2 in (188 cm)
- Weight: 198 lb (90 kg; 14 st 2 lb)
- Position: Center
- Shoots: Left
- SM-liiga team: HIFK
- Playing career: 2010–present

Niko Piiparinen (born July 17, 1989) is a Finnish professional ice hockey forward who currently plays for HIFK of the SM-liiga.
