= Juuso Kaijomaa =

Finnish ice hockey player

- Born: March 12, 1989 (age 36) Joensuu, Finland
- Height: 5 ft 11 in (180 cm)
- Weight: 179 lb (81 kg; 12 st 11 lb)
- Position: Forward
- Shot: Left
- SM-liiga team: SaiPa
- Playing career: 2008–2017

Juuso Kaijomaa (born March 12, 1989) is a Finnish ice hockey player who currently plays professionally in Finland for SaiPa of the SM-liiga.
