= Kiekko-Vantaa =

- City: Vantaa, Finland
- League: Mestis
- Founded: 1994
- Home arena: Trio Areena (capacity: 3,700)
- Colours
- Owners: Kiekko-Vantaa Hockey Oy
- General manager: Kai Sointu
- Head coach: Simo Mälkiä
- Captain: Toni Leinonen
- Affiliates: Jokerit (Liiga)
- Website: http://www.kiekko-vantaa.fi

Kiekko-Vantaa is an ice hockey team from Vantaa, Finland, playing in the Mestis league. It plays its home games in Trio Areena. Kiekko-Vantaa has been in Mestis since the league started in 2000 and have been in the finals twice, losing both times. The team was owned by South Korean businessman Chung Mong-won from 2012 to 2015.

== Honours ==
=== Mestis ===
- (silver) Mestis (2): 2003, 2017
- (bronze) Mestis (1): 2025

== Retired numbers ==
- 7 Jukka Hakkarainen
- 10 Petri Pitkäjärvi
- 39 Antti Niemi
