= 2007 in Finland =

- Decades: 1980s; 1990s; 2000s; 2010s; 2020s
- See also: Other events of 2007; Timeline of Finnish history

Events in the year 2007 in Finland.

== Incumbents ==
- President – Tarja Halonen
- Prime Minister – Matti Vanhanen

== Events ==
- 18 March – the 2007 Finnish parliamentary election
- 10 & 12 May - Eurovision Song Contest 2007
- 7 November - Jokela school shooting
- 21 October – Finnish racing driver Kimi Räikkönen won his first Formula One World Championship, driving for Scuderia Ferrari at the Brazilian Grand Prix.

== Deaths ==
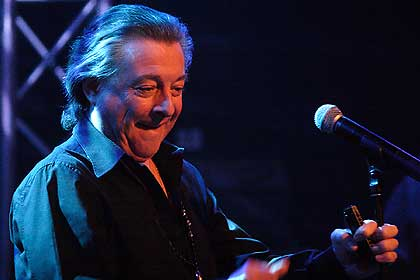
Kirka

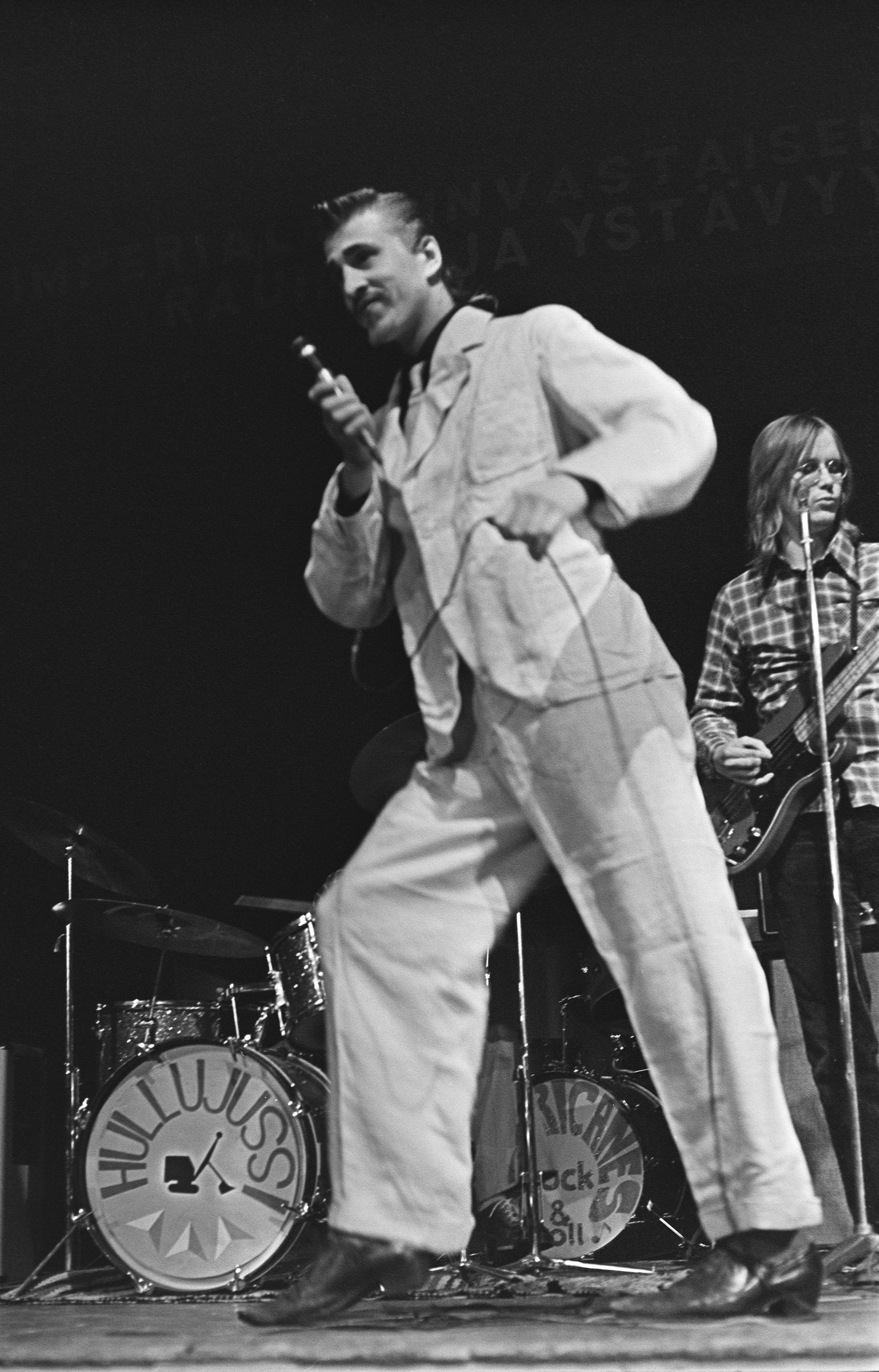
Eeki Mantere

- 2 January – Eino Lehtinen, veteran of the Finnish Civil War (b. 1900)
- 6 January – Alvar Saukko, civil servant and politician (b. 1929).
- 31 January – Kirka, musician (b. 1950)
- 21 February – Oiva Halmetoja, athlete (b. 1920).
- 27 February – Raimo Karlsson, wrestler (b. 1948).
- 24 March – Pentti Ikonen, swimmer (b. 1934).
- 8 April – Osmo Harkimo, cinematographer (b. 1923)
- 14 April – Reino Poutanen, rower (b. 1928).
- 15 April – Paavo Tiilikainen, politician (b. 1923).
- 16 April – Kaarlo Yrjö-Koskinen, baron, journalist and diplomat (b. 1930)
- 29 April – Pentti Lehto, illustrator, caricaturist, cartoonist and author of children's books (b. 1924)
- 30 April – Eeki Mantere, musician (b. 1949).
- 18 May – Rainer Lemström, politician (b. 1931).
- 30 May – Toivo Telen, shot putter (b. 1924).
- 4 June – Antti Viskari, long-distance runner (b. 1928).
- 23 July – Ragnar Wikström, figure skater (b. 1940)
- 9 August – Rolf Wiik, fencer (b. 1929).
- 23 August – Martti Pokela, folk musician and composer (b. 1924).
- 27 September – Marjatta Raita, actress (b. 1944)
- 29 September – Jorma Räty, weightlifter (b. 1946)
- 14 October – Pentti Snellman, athlete (b. 1926).
- 4 November – Lennart Rönnback, White Guard veteran of the Finnish Civil War of 1918 (b. 1905)
- 7 November - Pekka-Eric Auvinen, School shooter
- 22 December – Esko Valkama, footballer (b. 1924).
- 26 December – Voitto Liukkonen, sports commentator (b. 1940)
- 27 December – Pentti Pakarinen, ophthalmologist and politician (b. 1924).
- 31 December – Markku Peltola, actor and musician (b. 1956)

== See also ==
- 2007 in the European Union
- 2007 in Europe
