= 2006 in Finland =

- Decades: 1980s; 1990s; 2000s; 2010s; 2020s
- See also: Other events of 2006; Timeline of Finnish history

Events from the year 2006 in Finland.

== Incumbents ==
- President: Tarja Halonen
- Prime Minister: Matti Vanhanen
- Speaker: Paavo Lipponen

== Events ==
- January 1: Municipalities of Rovaniemi and Rovaniemen maalaiskunta united.
- January 15: The first round of the 2006 presidential election.
- January 29: Tarja Halonen selected as the president on the second round of the 2006 presidential election. She occupied the position from 2006 to 2012.
- March 16: Translation of Harry Potter and the Half-Blood Prince published at midnight.
- March 29: Partial solar eclipse.
- May 1: Rioting in Helsinki after EuroMayDay demonstrations at the VR warehouses.
- May 5: One of the two VR warehouses burned down in an apparent arson attack only a few days before their demolition was to begin.
- May 20: Lordi wins the Eurovision Song Contest 2006 in Athens, Greece.
- May 26: A crowd of 90,000 celebrates the victory of Eurovision Song Contest 2006 at the Market Square, Helsinki.
- May 29: An arsonist burns the roof of the Porvoo Cathedral causing massive damage to the building.
- May 31: Double murderer Antti Taskinen is sentenced to life in prison.
- July 1: Finland receives the presidency of the Council of the European Union.
- July 25: Jarno Mäkinen, a Finnish UNTSO observer killed in an Israeli attack during the 2006 Israel-Lebanon conflict.
- October 22: Gordon B. Hinckley dedicates the Helsinki Finland Temple.

== Sports ==
- Winter Olympic Games held in Turin, Italy:
  - February 26: Finland wins silver after losing to Sweden in the ice hockey.

== Deaths ==
- January 5: Ilpo Hakasalo, radio journalist
- January 16: Ville-Veikko Salminen, actor (b. 1937)
- January 25: Matti Tuominen, actor
- February 10: Kari K. Laurla, heraldist
- February 23: Mauri Favén, painter (b. 1920)
- April 18: Anna Hagman, the oldest living person in Finland at the time
- April 19: Tuure Salo, politician (b. 1921)
- April 24: Erik Bergman, composer, academician (b. 1911)
- April 25: Tabe Slioor, socialite, celebrity journalist (b. 1926)
- May 1: Rauno Lehtinen, conductor, composer (b. 1932)
- May 3: Nandor Mikola, painter (b. 1911)
- May 25: Kari S. Tikka, professor of finance, murdered (b. 1944)
- June 4: Jorma Palo, emeritus professor (b. 1930)
- July 8: Kari Kontio, author
- July 12: Kari Mannerla, board and card game designer (b. 1930)
- July 12: Jorma Pilkevaara, basketball player (b. 1945)
- July 14: Alice Kaira, painter
- July 16: Aulis Virtanen, sports editor (b. 1926)
- July 17: Paavo Einiö
- July 17: Paula Björkqvist, politician, killed by her husband (b. 1975)
- July 18: Ilmari Aarre-Ahtio, actor
- July 20: Risto Karlsson, journalist and author
- August 13: Elina Karjalainen, author (b. 1927)
- August 15: Jorma Weneskoski, Jazz musician and manager
- August 19: Jarkko Laine, author (b. 1947)
- September 8: Jaakko Pöyry, the founder of Pöyry oyj (b. 1924)
- November 24: Juice Leskinen, singer and songwriter (b. 1950)
- December 3: Raili Halttu, Olympic sprinter (b. 1909)
