= 2005 in Finland =

- Decades: 1980s; 1990s; 2000s; 2010s; 2020s
- See also: Other events of 2005; Timeline of Finnish history

Events from the year 2005 in Finland

== Incumbents ==
- President: Tarja Halonen
- Prime Minister: Matti Vanhanen
- Speaker: Paavo Lipponen

== Events ==
- 24 January – According to Finland-based Crisis Management Initiative group, Free Aceh Movement and the Indonesian government have agreed to negotiate for ceasefire in Helsinki.
- 23 June – Thousands of workers from UPM-Kymmene and Stora Enso, two leading Finnish companies in the paper industry go on strike over pay and working hours. Finland provides two thirds of the paper supply for the European magazine market. Industry analysts believe that the strike may have serious repercussions on the magazine market of Europe.
- 10 August – A Sikorsky S-76 helicopter of the Finnish company Copterline has crashed into the Gulf of Finland near Estonia's capital Tallinn with 14 on board; eight Finns, four Estonians and two Americans. There are no survivors.
- 15 August – The Indonesian government and rebels from the Free Aceh Movement (Gam) sign a peace deal aimed at ending their near 30 year conflict. UN Secretary-General Kofi Annan applauded both parties for reaching a peaceful settlement of the dispute through dialogue, and commended Martti Ahtisaari, former President of Finland, for the mediation role that he played throughout the negotiation process.

== Music ==
- Pestiferous release their debut album Deep Dark Seasons.

== Births ==
- 17 January – Alex Ramula, footballer
- 20 January – Roni Hudd, footballer
- 28 January – Tomas Galvez, footballer (born in the UK)
- 18 February – Felix Friberg, footballer
- 24 March – Daniel Armstrong, footballer
- 14 May – Dario Naamo, footballer
- 21 May – Dren Terrnava, footballer
- 10 September – Valentin Purosalo, footballer

== Deaths ==
- 10 May: Veikko Hursti, philanthropist (b. 1924)
- 15 May: Aulis Kallakorpi, Olympic ski jumper (b. 1929)
- 2 August: Tuukka Mäkelä, Olympic shooter (b. 1927)
- 2 August: Rainer Forss, footballer and manager (b. 1930)
- 15 October: Matti Wuori, politician (b. 1945)
- 3 December: Kikka Sirén, singer (b. 1964)
