= 2002 in Finland =

- Decades: 1980s; 1990s; 2000s; 2010s; 2020s
- See also: Other events of 2002; Timeline of Finnish history

The following lists events that happened during 2002 in Finland.

== Incumbents ==
- President: Tarja Halonen
- Prime Minister: Paavo Lipponen

== Events ==
- Kamppi Car Bomb: On 16 July 2002, a car bomb detonated in the Kamppi district of Helsinki. The blast was linked to a rare contract killing.
- Myyrmanni Bombing: On 11 October 2002, a bomb exploded at the Myyrmanni shopping centre in Vantaa, near Helsinki. The attack killed seven people and injured around 159 others, including children.
- Rally Finland 2002, part of the World Rally Championship, is held in Jyväskylä and won by Marcus Grönholm.

== Births ==
- Joakim Oldorff – Finnish Badminton player
- Linnea Ceder – Finnish Figure skater
- Adam Mekki – Finnish Footballer
- Ona Huczkowski – Finnish Actress

== Deaths ==
- Erkki Salmenhaara – Finnish composer and musicologist (died 19 March 2002).
