= 2001 in Finland =

- Decades: 1980s; 1990s; 2000s; 2010s; 2020s
- See also: Other events of 2001; Timeline of Finnish history

The following lists events that happened during 2001 in Finland.

== Incumbents ==
- President: Tarja Halonen
- Prime Minister: Paavo Lipponen

== Events ==
- March 2 – The Finnish Medical Association began a doctors' strike that lasted until August 18th.
- August 24 – Heino murders: Four teenagers murdered businessman Martti Heino and his wife Elise Heino in Loppi.

== Births ==
- February 13 – Kaapo Kakko, ice hockey player

== Deaths ==
- January 15 – Kaija Siren, 80, architect
- March 3 – Maija Isola, 73, textile designer
- June 27 – Tove Jansson, 86, author, painter and comic strip artist
- September 7 – Spede Pasanen, 71, television star, film director and inventor, heart attack.
- October 20 – Marko Hirsma, 36, musician, outlaw biker and gangster, murdered
- November 26 – Nils-Aslak Valkeapää, 58, Finnish-Sami writer, musician, and artist
