= Pakarinen =

Pakarinen is a Finnish surname. Notable people with the surname include:

- Ari Pakarinen (born 1969), Finnish javelin thrower
- Esa Pakarinen (1911–1989), Finnish actor and musician
- Esa Pakarinen Junior (1947–2026), Finnish actor
- Hanna Pakarinen (born 1981), Finnish singer
- Iiro Pakarinen (born 1991), Finnish professional ice hockey player
- Ilmari Pakarinen (1910–1987), Finnish gymnast
- Kalevi Pakarinen (1935–1999), Finnish fencer
- Maikki Järnefelt-Palmgren (née Pakarinen; 1871–1929), Finnish operatic soprano
- Pentti Pakarinen (1924–2007), Finnish ophthalmologist and politician
- Pia Pakarinen (born 1990), Finnish actress, model and beauty pageant titleholder
