= 2000 in Finland =

- Decades: 1980s; 1990s; 2000s; 2010s; 2020s
- See also: Other events of 2000; Timeline of Finnish history

The following lists events that happened during 2000 in Finland.

== Incumbents ==
- President: Martti Ahtisaari (until 1 March), Tarja Halonen (starting 1 March)
- Prime Minister: Paavo Lipponen

== Events ==
- 16 January to 6 February - 2000 Finnish presidential election with Tarja Halonen elected as the first female president of Finland.

== Births ==
- July 6 – Jesperi Kotkaniemi, ice hockey player
- October 1 – Kalle Rovanperä, rally driver
- December 26 – Isac Elliot, actor, dancer, singer and songwriter

=== Full date unknown ===
- Tom Kuchka, American bluegrass musician who lived in Finland (b. 1938)
