= 2004 in Finland =

- Decades: 1980s; 1990s; 2000s; 2010s; 2020s
- See also: Other events of 2004; Timeline of Finnish history

Events from the year 2004 in Finland

== Incumbents ==
- President: Tarja Halonen
- Prime Minister: Matti Vanhanen
- Speaker: Paavo Lipponen

== Deaths ==
- 6 January: Markku Salminen, orienteer (b. 1946)
- 16 January: Kalevi Sorsa, politician, prime minister 1972–1975, 1977–1979, 1982–1987 (b. 1930)
- 26 February: Adolf Ehrnrooth, general (b. 1905)
- 30 July: Vivica Bandler, theatre director (b. 1917)
- 12 November: Usko Meriläinen, composer (b. 1930)
- 24 December: Lauri Silvennoinen, Olympic cross-country skier (1948 silver medal winner in men's 4 x 10 kilometre cross-country skiing relay) (b. 1916)
