= Liukkonen =

Liukkonen is a Finnish surname. Notable people with the surname include:

- Voitto Liukkonen (1940–2007), Finnish sports commentator
- Ari-Pekka Liukkonen (born 1989), Finnish swimmer
- Miki Liukkonen (1989–2023), Finnish writer, poet and musician
- Veera Ruoho, née Liukkonen
