= 2003 in Finland =

- Decades: 1980s; 1990s; 2000s; 2010s; 2020s
- See also: Other events of 2003; Timeline of Finnish history

Events from the year 2003 in Finland

== Incumbents ==
- President: Tarja Halonen
- Prime Minister: Anneli Jäätteenmäki (until 23 June); Matti Vanhanen onwards
- Speaker: Anneli Jäätteenmäki (until 23 March); Paavo Lipponen onwards

== Events ==
- 15 April: Parliament of Finland elects Anneli Jäätteenmäki as the nation's first woman Prime Minister.
- 16 April: The Helsingin Sanomat reports that in late March, a RITEG-beacon was disassembled by thieves in Kurgolovo, Russia, who dumped the highly radioactive nuclear material into the Gulf of Finland, 100 km south of Finland.
- 10 May: The first confirmed SARS case is reported in Finland. A man who had been visiting Toronto is now being treated at Turku University Hospital.
- 23 May: A Russian nuclear energy company founded a branch to promote its bid for Finland's new nuclear power plant. Competing bids have been submitted by French-German company Framatome and General Electric. Finnish power company TVO will make its selection in the autumn at the earliest, but by the end of the year at the latest.
- 1 August: The Ministry of Social Affairs and Health plans to propose an amendment to Finnish tobacco legislation which would make retail sales of tobacco products subject to a license.
- 23 August: Power outage happens all of Southern Finland for 30 to 60 minutes, because one underground line in Central Helsinki short circuits. The lack of electricity begins at 20:20 and causes radio broadcasts, public lights, elevators, trains, trams and metro traffic to stop. Also people have to be evacuated in Linnanmäki amusement park.

== Deaths ==
- 10 January: Ensio Siilasvuo, 81, general
- 16 February: Teemu Raimoranta, 25, metal musician
- 10 April: Aatos Fred, 85, chess player, two-time Finnish Chess Championship winner (1947, 1955).
- 14 April: Jyrki Otila, 61, quiz show judge and member of the European Parliament.
- 27 April: Juha Tiainen, 47, hammer thrower and Olympic champion
- 16 June: Georg Henrik von Wright, 87, philosopher, professor and writer.
- 2 July: Erkki Mallenius, 75, amateur boxer and Olympic medalist.
- 16 August: Gösta Sundqvist, 46, musician and radio personality
- 11 September: Antti Nurmesniemi, 76, designer.
- 13 September: Kaino Lempinen, 82, gymnast and Olympic medalist.
- 10 October: Eila Hiltunen, 80, sculptor.
- 24 October: Veikko Hakulinen, 78, cross-country skier, triple Olympic- and world champion, traffic collision.
- 29 November: Jan-Magnus Jansson, 81, politician. chairman of the Swedish People's Party of Finland.
- 8 December: Pekka Siitoin, 59, satanist, occultist and neo-Nazi
- 16 December: Veikko Sinisalo, 77, actor.
