= Heikki Haavisto =

Finnish politician and lobbyist (1935–2022)

Ministeri (Minister) Heikki Haavisto
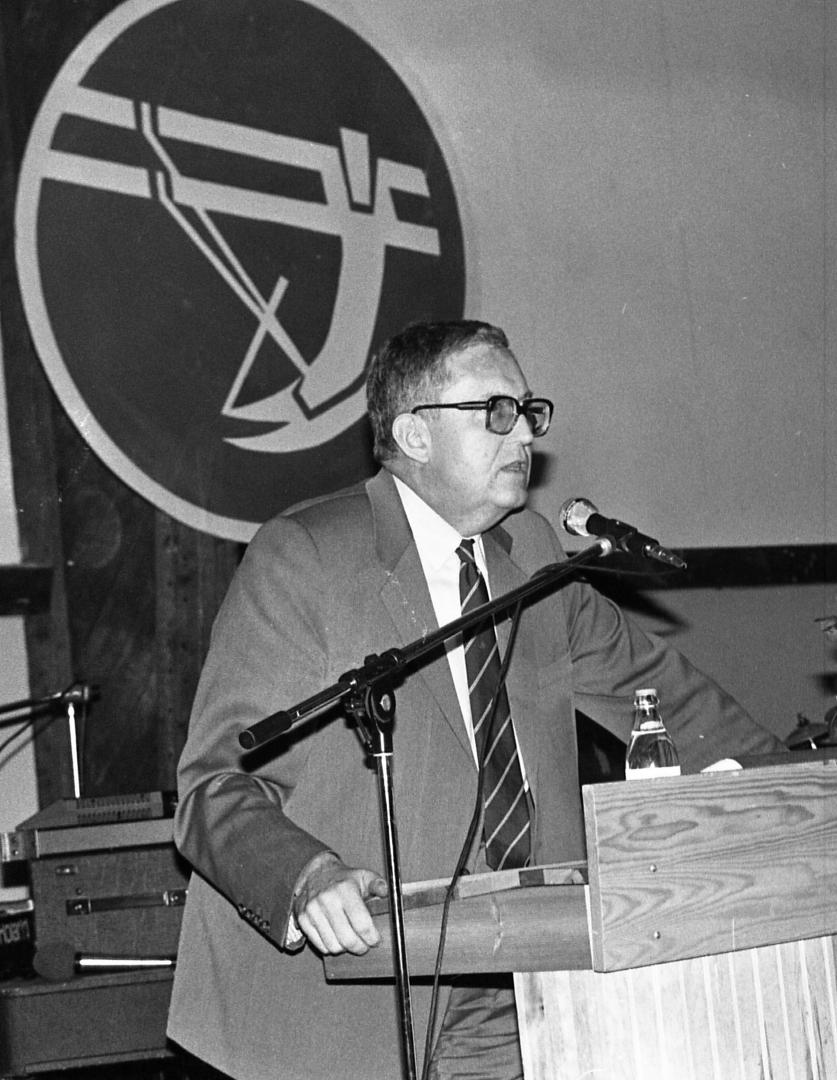

Foreign Minister of Finland
- In office 5 May 1993 – 3 February 1995
- Preceded by: Paavo Väyrynen
- Succeeded by: Paavo Rantanen

Personal details
- Born: 20 August 1935 Raisio, Finland
- Died: 22 July 2022 (aged 86) Raisio, Finland
- Party: Centre Party
- Occupation: Politician, lobbyist

Heikki Haavisto (20 August 1935 – 22 July 2022) was a Finnish politician and lobbyist. He was the Minister of Foreign Affairs in Esko Aho's cabinet between 1993 and 1995 representing Centre Party.

Haavisto was a long-term chairman of MTK, a lobby organization of Central Union of Agricultural Producers and Forest Owners. He was the chairman of the organization between 1976 and 1994. He was an agronomist by education.

Haavisto was one of the chief negotiators, when Finland negotiated the accession into the European Union. He resigned as the foreign minister on 21 January 1995 due to a serious illness.

Political offices
Preceded by Paavo Väyrynen	Foreign Minister of Finland; 1993–1995	Succeeded by Paavo Rantanen
