= Paavo Rantanen =

Finnish diplomat (born 1934)

Minister Paavo Rantanen
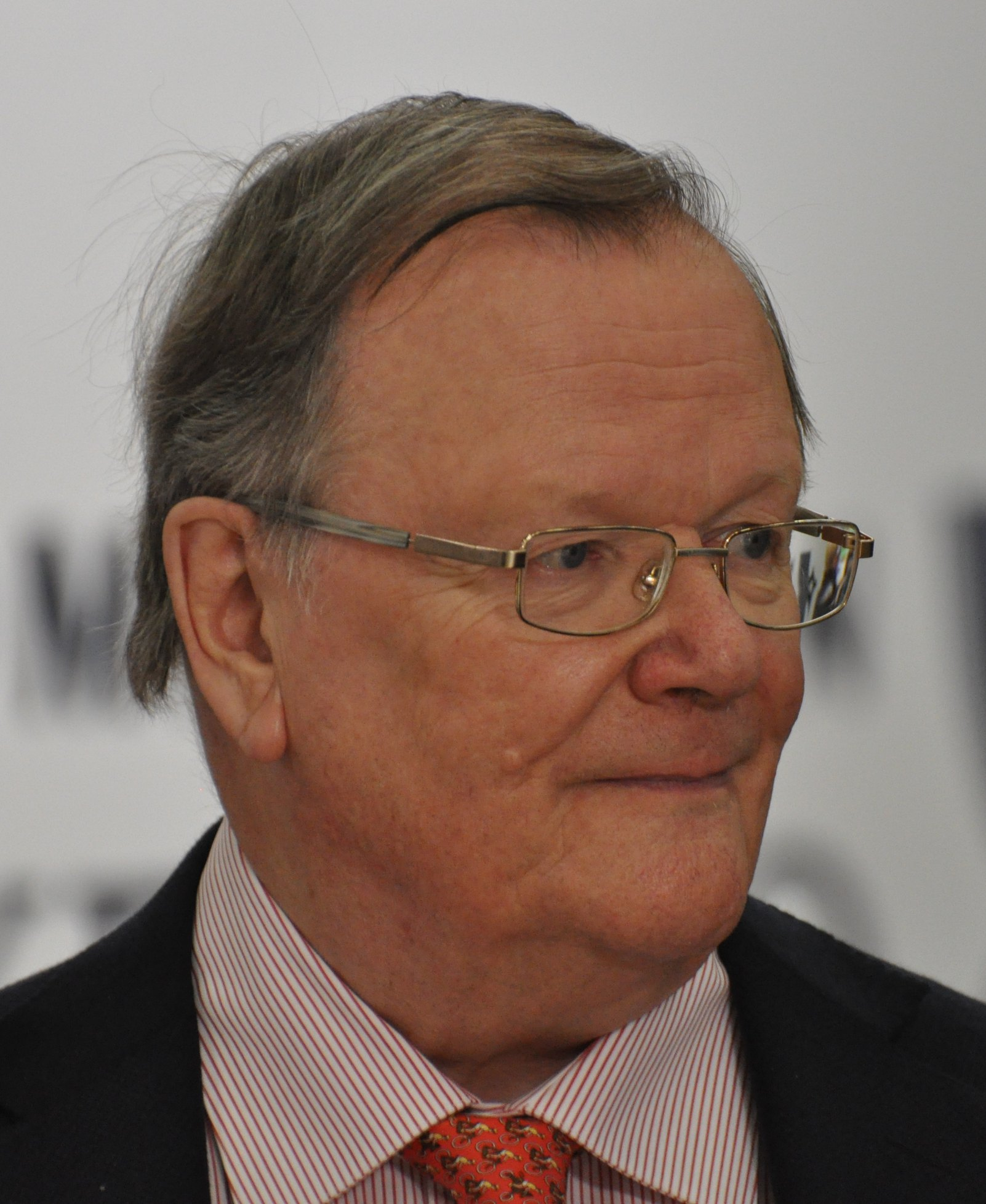
- Paavo Rantanen in 2012

Foreign Minister of Finland
- In office 3 February 1995 – 13 April 1995
- Preceded by: Heikki Haavisto
- Succeeded by: Tarja Halonen

Personal details
- Born: 28 February 1934 Jyväskylä, Finland
- Died: 16 October 2026 (aged 92) Helsinki
- Party: Independent
- Education: University of Helsinki
- Occupation: Diplomat

Paavo Ilmari Rantanen (28 February 1934 – 16 October 2026) was a Finnish former Foreign Ministry official who was briefly the Minister for Foreign Affairs.

Rantanen was an undersecretary of foreign trade before becoming the Finnish ambassador to Washington. He worked in the Ministry of Foreign Affairs for thirty years from 1958 to 1988. He also served on the Nokia Executive Board 1988–1995, until he became a non-aligned Minister of Foreign Affairs in the Esko Aho's cabinet following the resignation of Heikki Haavisto. Rantanen was the Minister of Foreign Affairs for 70 days and resigned after the 1995 parliamentary elections.

Political offices
Preceded by Heikki Haavisto	Foreign Minister of Finland; 1995	Succeeded by Tarja Halonen
