= Eino Lehtinen =

Finnish soldier

Eino Arvid Lehtinen (10 April 1900 – 2 January 2007) was a soldier, teacher and writer. At the age of 106 years and nine months, he was one of the last surviving veterans of the Finnish Civil War, and one of the oldest people in Finland at the time of his death. Lehtinen served with the White Guard, led by Carl Gustaf Emil Mannerheim, during the Finnish Civil War of 1918, after the country had declared independence from the Russian Empire.

== Biography ==
Lehtinen was born on 10 April 1900 the youngest of nine children. He took part in the Finnish Civil War as a soldier in the Finnish White Guard, and his older brother Iisakki was killed at Pälkäne, on the Vilppula front in 1918. Eino Lehtinen got married in 1926 to Aili Sanelma Saarimaa, a nurse. They had seven children, including five girls. Their marriage lasted until Aili's death in 1986.

Lehtinen, who came from a humble farming background, was taught privately from 1917 by primary school teacher Maija Aaltonen. He left school as a top student. He graduated from Rauma College in 1924 and then worked as a teacher throughout his life, moving to different schools around Finland, reaching the post of head teacher before he retired in 1961.

He was an active church member, singing in two choirs, founding and directing two of them and playing the church organ. Lehtinen was passionate about literature and music. He turned his creative hand to embroidery and the making of traditional Finnish ryijy rugs.

Lehtinen wrote two books, one of poetry, entitled Haaksi Kantaa Yli Kuohujen (English: To haul over the horizons), published in Rauma in 1974, and the other an extensive family history that traced its origin from Finnish 16th-century freedom fighter Jaakko Ilkka to the present day. It was published in 1995. Lehtinen was an honorary war veteran club member in Ylistaro, near Seinäjoki, where he was born. At 103 years old, Lehtinen still walked to church on his own without assistance. He died in Raisio, where he lived, at the age of 106, three months short of his 107th birthday.

After the death of Lehtinen and Lennart Rönnback, there were only two survivors of the Finnish civil war: one of them was Aarne Arvonen, who was born in 1897. He was Finland's oldest person until he died in 2009.
