= Pentti Lehto =

Finnish artist

Pentti Johannes Lehto (February 15, 1924 – April 20, 2007) was a Finnish illustrator, caricaturist, cartoonist and author of children's books. He lived in Tampere and drew cartoons for newspapers and magazines such as Aamulehti and Apu. His pseudonym as a cartoonist was Penalehto.

== Works ==
- Salaperäiset kirjaimet. Karisto 1952
- Herjat & narrit. WSOY 1979
