= Esko Valkama =

Finnish footballer (1924-2007)

Esko Uolevi Valkama (21 December 1924 – 28 December 2007) is a Finnish former footballer who competed in the 1952 Summer Olympics. He was born in Kiikoinen.
