= Aulis Virtanen =

Aulis Virtanen (27 August 1926, Turku – 16 July 2006) was a Finnish ice hockey editor, journalist, sportscaster and rink announcer.

== Career ==
Aulis Virtanen started in Turun Sanomat as an ice hockey editor in 1945 and worked until 1950. He was the main public address announcer of the Turku Refereeclub from 1950 until his death in 2006. He also worked in radio and TV as play-by-play announcer between 1960–1970. Virtanen became famous in the 1970s from his job as the announcer for English Premiership Football games in Finland. He was the public address announcer in TPS's ice hockey games for decades.

Virtanen is in the Finnish ice hockey museum as Jääkiekkoleijona #118 (Ice Hockey lion #118)
