= Nándor Mikola =

Nándor Mikola (1911-2006) was a Hungarian-Finnish artist.

Born Nándor Josef Mikolajcsik (Hungarian: Mikolajcsik Nándor József) in Budapest, he followed in the footsteps of his father the Hungarian artist Ignác Mikolajcik by entering the Budapest University for Art and Design in 1928 to study lithography. At the same time he studied painting at the Budapest Free Art Academy under the guidance of Gyula Rudnay. He graduated as a lithographer in 1932 and participated for the first time in a public exhibition at the Obuda district culture house in Budapest, where he displayed his watercolour paintings. That year he worked as a lithographer in Budapest but continued studies at Graphic Institute of Vienna the same year. In 1935 Mikola arrived in Helsinki, Finland to help his Hungarian artist friend Josef Miklos to decorate a restaurant called "Hungaria". He started studying graphics at the Art Industrial Central-school in Helsinki under the guidance of Germund Paaer, and in 1938 the firm Lassila & Tikanoja in Vaasa employed him as a commercial draughtsman of (he later became the company's director of PR).
