= Toivo Telen =

Finnish shot putter

Toivo Telen (10 April 1924 – 30 May 2007) was a Finnish shot putter who competed in the 1952 Summer Olympics.
