= Kari S. Tikka =

Finnish legal scholar

Kari Sulo Tikka (21 August 1944 in Lahti – 25 May 2006 in Helsinki) was a Finnish legal scholar. He was a Professor of Finance Law at the University of Helsinki and one of Finland's leading experts on taxation.

== Career ==
Kari S. Tikka had a long career in justice education and development of education, both in the undergraduate and postgraduate levels. He had also previously worked as chairman of the Finnish Lawyer Union.

Tikka was a member of several law preparation work groups, and had a central influence in the development of Finnish taxation law. Among his achievements are the system for refunding corporate tax, which was later abandoned, as taxing Finnish and foreign dividends differently became contrary to the European Union basic treaty.

Before his death, Tikka publicly announced his support for the flat tax. He proposed that different taxation of capital income and work income widens the financial gap between corporate shareholders and regular workers.

Tikka wrote several scientific articles and books, among which are "Veropolitiikka" ("taxation policy") and "Yritysverotus I-II" ("corporate taxation I-II"), together with O. Nykänen. His PhD thesis "Veron minimoinnista" ("on the minimisation of tax") was at its time one of Finland's best selling PhD theses.

== Death ==
Tikka was found dead in his apartment on 28 May 2006. He was 61 years old at the time. The night before his death, Tikka had left a gay nightclub named DTM on Iso-Roobertinkatu, Helsinki, with two men of approximately 20 years of age. Next day the police arrested the 19-old Russian Aleksandr Ionin and 23-year-old Estonian-born Mika-Martti Zukov, who were later sentenced by the Helsinki District Court to 11 years in prison for manslaughter and aggravated robbery. The homicide had nothing to do with Tikka's profession, but the motive was robbery. In the court, Ionin and Zukov admitted having stolen 15 bottles of alcohol, 49 packs of cigarettes, a mobile phone cover, a pocket knife, one pair of binoculars, a video camera, and some cash.

== Private life ==
In his private life, Tikka embraced art by collecting paintings and watching ballet and theatre. His collection included works by Pablo Picasso, Henri Matisse and Marc Chagall.

His sexuality was sort of a public secret in Helsinki, as he did not conceal his frequenting in gay nightclubs, but the subject never came up in press or interviews. After Tikka's death, his homosexuality was however mentioned in stories about him.

== Bibliography ==
- Tikka, Kari S. (1990). Veropolitiikka. Publications of the Lawyers' Union. ISBN 951-640-494-4
- Tikka, Kari S., and Nykänen, Olli (1985). Yritysverotus 1. WSOY. ISBN 951-0-12664-0.
- Tikka, Kari S., and Nykänen, Olli (1985). Yritysverotus 2. WSOY. ISBN 951-0-12657-8.
