= Pestiferous =

Finnish black metal band

Pestiferous ws a Finnish black metal band.

The band released the albums Deep Dark Seasons (2005) and Gateway (2006) on Italian label Behemoth Productions. In Finland, Noise.fi rated both albums as 3 out of 5. The reviewer described the debut album as a "homage to traditional Norwegian black metal. Almost everything superfluous has been stripped from the music, and only cold and straightforward black metal remains, which relies primarily on simple, melodic and atmospheric guitar riffs". Whereas the first half of Deep Dark Seasons was "especially beautiful to listen to in its gloom", the second half, which was more influenced by thrash and death metal than the first, "falls short of the first five tracks". Though the rating was the same for Gateway, this album was produced differently, causing "a certain aggression and edge" to disappear, "but the melancholy and wistful atmosphere hidden in the melodies can now be heard more clearly". Furthermore, the quality of the songs was more even throughout, though the album lacked a "few attention-grabbing hit songs".

Norway's Scream gave Gateway 4 out of 6, reasoning that nothing was new about the music, though the band employed "interesting beat changes". The reviewer liked "the coldness and the groove", meaning that Gateway was a good fit for those "out after some cold and primitive black metal". Blabbermouth characterized Gateway as "a pretty darn good listen", though the band did not stand out enough to reach the year-end top 10 lists of many, it was "surely a solid effort and a good bet to please fans of primal, root-based black metal". The score was thus 6.5 out of 10. The album cover "speaks volumes of the pitch-black metal in store", a "feral output" with a "sooty", "freezing atmosphere". This reviewer too praised the tempo shifts.
