= Dren Terrnava =

Finnish footballer (born 2005)

Personal information
- Date of birth: 21 May 2005 (age 21)
- Place of birth: Turku, Finland
- Height: 1.90 m (6 ft 3 in)
- Position: Midfielder

Team information
- Current team: VPS
- Number: 17

Youth career
- –2022: TPS
- 2022–: Parma

Senior career*
Years	Team	Apps	(Gls)
2021	TPS II	13	(0)
2021–2022	TPS	0	(0)
2022–2026	Parma	0	(0)
2025–2026	→ Perugia (loan)	5	(0)
2026–	VPS	9	(0)

International career^{‡}
2021–2022	Finland U17	9	(0)
2022–2023	Finland U18	9	(1)
2023–2024	Finland U19	5	(0)
2024–	Finland U21	1	(0)
Medal record
Finland U18
First place	Baltic Cup	2023
- * Club domestic league appearances and goals as of 13 November 2026 ‡ National team caps and goals as of 9 June 2024

Dren Terrnava (Albanian: Dren Tërrnava ; born 21 May 2005) is a Finnish professional football midfielder for Veikkausliiga club Vaasan Palloseura.

== Club career ==
=== TPS ===
Born in Turku, Terrnava spent his youth years with Turun Palloseura (TPS). He made his senior debut with the club's reserve team in the fourth-tier Kolmonen in 2021.

=== Parma ===
In January 2022, he moved to Italy and signed a deal with Parma for an undisclosed fee, and was first registered to their U17 academy squad. He played a total of 37 matches in the U17 and U18 squads, before in April 2023 he was promoted to U19 squad, playing in Primavera 2.

==== Loan to Perugia ====
On 1 September 2025, Terrnava joined Serie C club Perugia on a loan deal.

== International career ==
A regular Finnish youth international, Terrnava has represented Finland at various youth levels, in under-17, under-18 and under-19 youth national teams.

Terrnava was part of the Finland U18 squad winning the friendly tournament Baltic Cup in June 2023.

In October 2023, Terrnava was part of the Finland U19 squad in the 2024 UEFA European Under-19 Championship qualification tournament, in three games against Romania, Czech Republic and San Marino.

== Personal life ==
Born and raised in Finland, Terrnava is of Kosovo Albanian descent.

== Honours ==
Finland U18

- Baltic Cup: 2023
