= Heino murders =

2001 double murder in Finland

The Heino murders were a double murder case in Finland on 24 August 2001 when 16-year-old Saku Salo, 17-year-olds Sampsa Mäntylä and Jani Pesola, and 18-year-old-Markus Aarre Walter Österman murdered businessman Martti Heino and his wife Elise Heino in Loppi.

== Murder ==
The Heino couple were enticed to come to a summer cabin in Loppi to discuss business issues, including the sale of 100 mobile phones. When the two arrived they were met by Pesola, who guided them to a location that was within range of Salo, waiting in ambush behind a rock. Martti Heino was killed by the first bullet, which hit him in the neck. Elise Heino made a call to emergency services on her mobile phone, but it was cut off by the second bullet. Salo, Pesola and Mäntylä packed the bodies into large sports bags, placed them in Martti Heino's car, drove the car back to Espoo, and dumped the bags into the sea off the Espoo coast. On the following day the boys broke into the Heino household and stole a number of mobile phones. The bodies were discovered by the police on 4 September 2001 after an extensive search.

The motive for the murder was that Österman had felt Martti Heino had cheated him in a mobile telephone buying and selling scheme. Österman had paid one thousand Finnish marks (the equivalent of some 150 euros or US dollars) to the younger boys to get them involved in the murder.

== Trial ==
All four were arrested on 28 August 2001. The trial started on 21 November 2001 in the Riihimäki district court. Each of the four boys was charged on two counts of murder and two counts of aggravated robbery. State Prosecutor Matti Nissinen demanded a life imprisonment for Österman. For Salo, Pesola and Mäntylä, the state prosecutor demanded sentences of 13-14 years' imprisonment for homicides committed whilst still a minor. The courtroom was packed with a large group of journalists, but the parents of the boys were not present.

The trial began with Matti Nissinen's lengthy description of the events. Nissinen charged that each of the defendants had a specific task and that they had followed this consistently. Nissinen asserted that the idea had come from Österman, who had persuaded the others to take part. Österman himself denied all involvements in the murders.

All four were subjected to a mental health examination. It was found that they were aware of the significance of what they were doing.

== Sentences ==
The court found that Österman had planned the murders and was the only one who could have stopped them from happening, sentencing him to life in prison. Salo was sentenced to 13 years in prison, whereas Pesola and Mäntylä received 12 years each.

The case was appealed to the Appeals Court of the city of Kouvola, which later upheld the sentences. Österman then tried to appeal his sentence to the Supreme Court, but his appeal was declined.

In November 2012, after serving approximately 11 years in prison, the Appeals Court of the city of Helsinki granted Österman a parole. He was released from prison in August 2013.
