= Felix Friberg =

Finnish footballer (born 2005)

Personal information
- Date of birth: 18 February 2005 (age 21)
- Place of birth: Finland
- Position: Full back

Team information
- Current team: KPV (on loan from VPS)

Youth career
- –2019: Sundom IF
- 2019–2022: VPS

Senior career*
Years	Team	Apps	(Gls)
2022–	VPS II	45	(9)
2023–	VPS	1	(0)
2025–	→ KPV (loan)	0	(0)

International career^{‡}
2021	Finland U17	2	(0)
- * Club domestic league appearances and goals as of 23 October 2024 ‡ National team caps and goals as of 21 February 2024

Felix Friberg (born 18 February 2005) is a Finnish professional football player who plays as a defender for KPV Kokkola, on loan from Vaasan Palloseura.

== Club career ==
On 15 October 2022, Friberg extended his contract with VPS and signed a new two-year deal with the club. He made his Veikkausliiga debut in the 2023 season.
