= Paula Björkqvist =

Finnish politician

Paula Björkqvist (3 January 1975 – 17 July 2006) was a Finnish politician of the Centre Party in Jämsä. She was stabbed 69 times by her husband, Jarmo Björkvist, in 2006. He received a life sentence but was later released on parole in 2020.
