= Tom Kuchka =

Tom Kuchka (1938 in Pennsylvania, USA - 2000 in Finland) was an American bluegrass musician who lived in Finland since the late 1960s. A New York jazz musician, he discovered bluegrass after moving to Finland and introduced this music genre to a large number of Finnish musicians and enthusiasts at his weekly Toimela Bluegrass Workshop in Helsinki which he ran for over thirty years. He was also a well-known jazz instructor.

Multi-instrumentalist Kuchka could play virtually any bluegrass-related instrument, so that he could put together bands and fill in the missing instrument himself. His main instrument was the upright bass, and he often performed as the lead singer in his high tenor voice.

Tom Kuchka died in 2000. In 2002, he was voted European Bluegrass Pioneer by representatives of the European World of Bluegrass Association around Europe.

Tom Kuchka's daughter is the Finnish photographer and video artist Heta Kuchka (born 1974).
