= Antti Taskinen =

Finnish double-murderer (born 1976)

Antti Olavi Taskinen (born 1976) is a Finnish double-murderer, who is responsible for the deaths of at least two men in Tampere and Heinola. He was sentenced to life in prison on 31 May 2006.

Taskinen was suspected to have killed his first victim, a 20-year-old student from Tampere, in August 1996. The victim died of a Dolcontin (morphine) overdose. This was initially considered an "aggravated involuntary manslaughter" (in Finnish: kuolemantuottamus) by the District Court, but later overturned in the Court of Appeal.

In February 1997 Taskinen was spending time in Tampere with a 30-year-old man. The man died, and a massive Abalgin (dextropropoxyphene) overdose was found from his blood. Before his death the victim had made a testament in favor of Taskinen. This was considered a manslaughter (in Finnish: tappo) by both the District Court and the Court of Appeal.

In November 2005 Taskinen murdered his final victim, Markku Heimo Juhani Franssila. He was a rich 54-year-old business manager, who had a villa in Heinola, where the murder took place. The men had lived in a registered partnership for the last four months. Franssila had died of an Abalgin overdose. The motive for that murder was the inheritance Taskinen would have been given.

Taskinen was arrested in January 2006. He was suspected for the murder of Franssila. The police soon started to suspect him of two earlier homicides too. He was found guilty, and on 31 May 2006 sentenced to life imprisonment for aggravated involuntary manslaughter, a manslaughter and a murder. Taskinen appealed the decision, and the hearing in the Court of Appeal started in February 2007. The court upheld the convictions on murder and manslaughter, but overturned the charge on "aggravated involuntary manslaughter" (kuolemantuottamus), stating the death might have been caused by a heroin overdose. The sentence of life imprisonment remained.

In May 2007 Taskinen tried to appeal to the Supreme Court, but no leave to appeal was granted, rendering his sentence final. Taskinen immediately sought pardon from the President, but the pardon was denied in July 2007.

While in prison, Taskinen changed his name and studied law, becoming a Master of Laws.

In April 2022, the Helsinki Court of Appeal decided that Taskinen will be released from prison at the end of July 2023.
