= VR warehouses =

Logistics complex in central Helsinki

Coordinates: 60°10.383′N 24°56.134′E

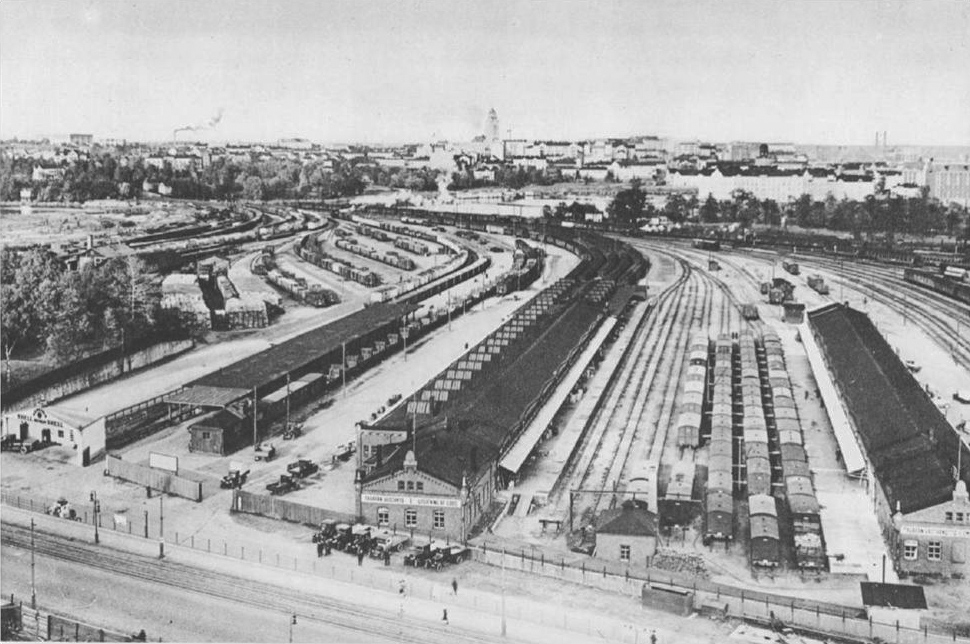
The warehouses in the 1930s.

The VR warehouses (Finnish: VR:n makasiinit) were a group of redbrick railway warehouses designed by Bruno Granholm in the centre of Helsinki, Finland. They were used by the Finnish State Railways from their construction in 1899 until the 1980s. Their official address was Mannerheimintie 13. The warehouses were badly damaged in a fire on 5 May 2006 and were subsequently demolished. The Helsinki Music Centre was built on the site of the warehouses.

== History ==
Due to the way Helsinki had developed with the placement of the Helsinki Central railway station in 1860, a large area of land in the centre of the city was bought for use as a railyard by the state railways in 1870. The oldest parts of the warehouses were designed by Bruno Granholm and built in 1898–1899, when they served as the cargo terminal for the Helsinki Central railway station. The warehouses were extended in 1908 and 1917, with the most recent additions being from the 1950s. They were used by the state railways as cargo warehouses until the 1980s, when they were abandoned and gradually fell into disrepair. The warehouses were without a permanent specific purpose but could be rented by anyone wishing to organize some sort of public event.

During the 1900s, there had been numerous plans to integrate the area within the city plan, including master plans by architects Eliel Saarinen and Alvar Aalto, none of which were realised. A number of key public buildings ended up being built around the edge of the yards, including the Parliament House, the Finlandia Hall concert hall and the Kiasma Museum of Contemporary Art.

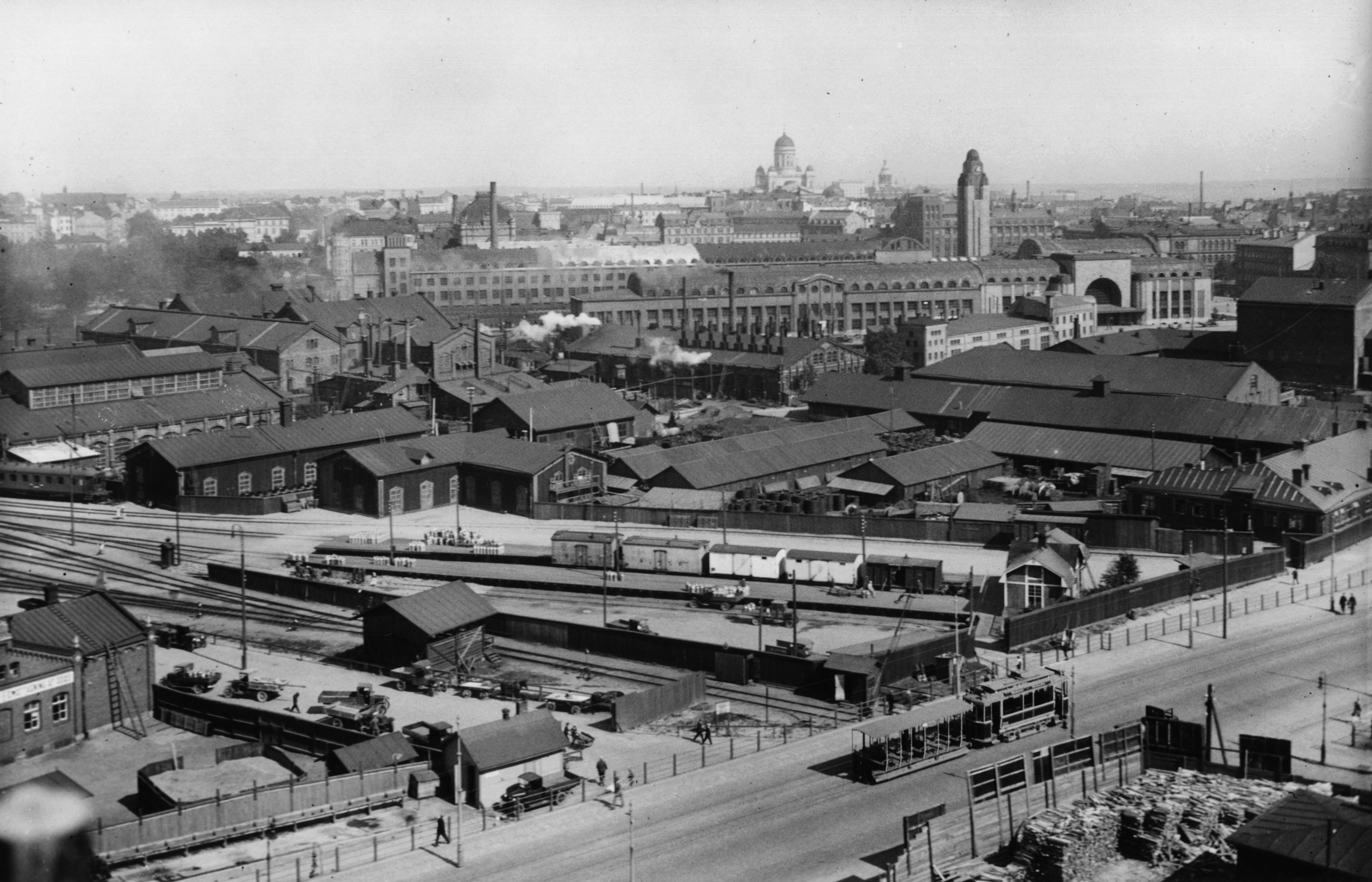
Töölö freight yard seen from the roof of the Parliament House in 1930s

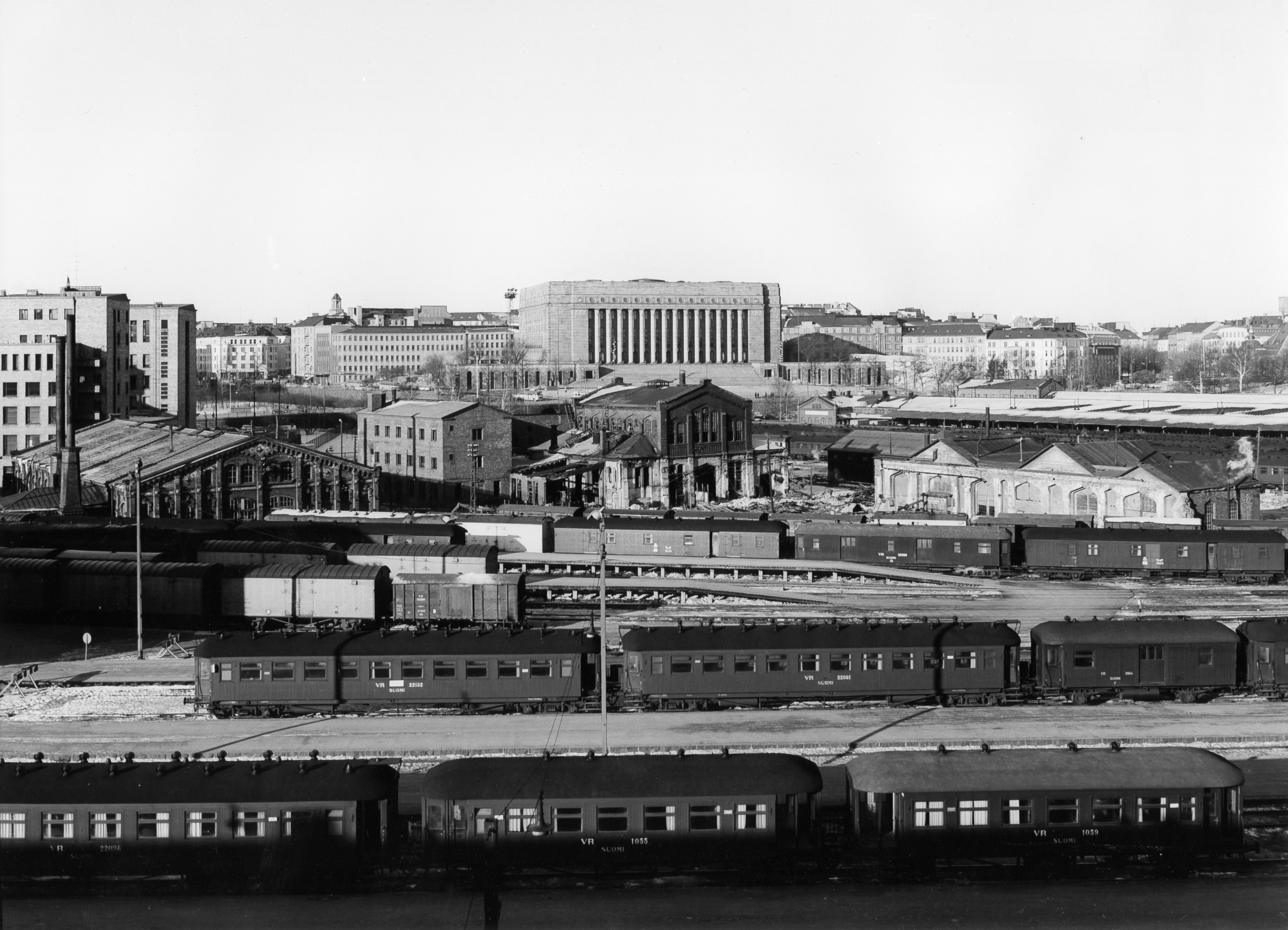
From the opposite side with the Parliament House in the background

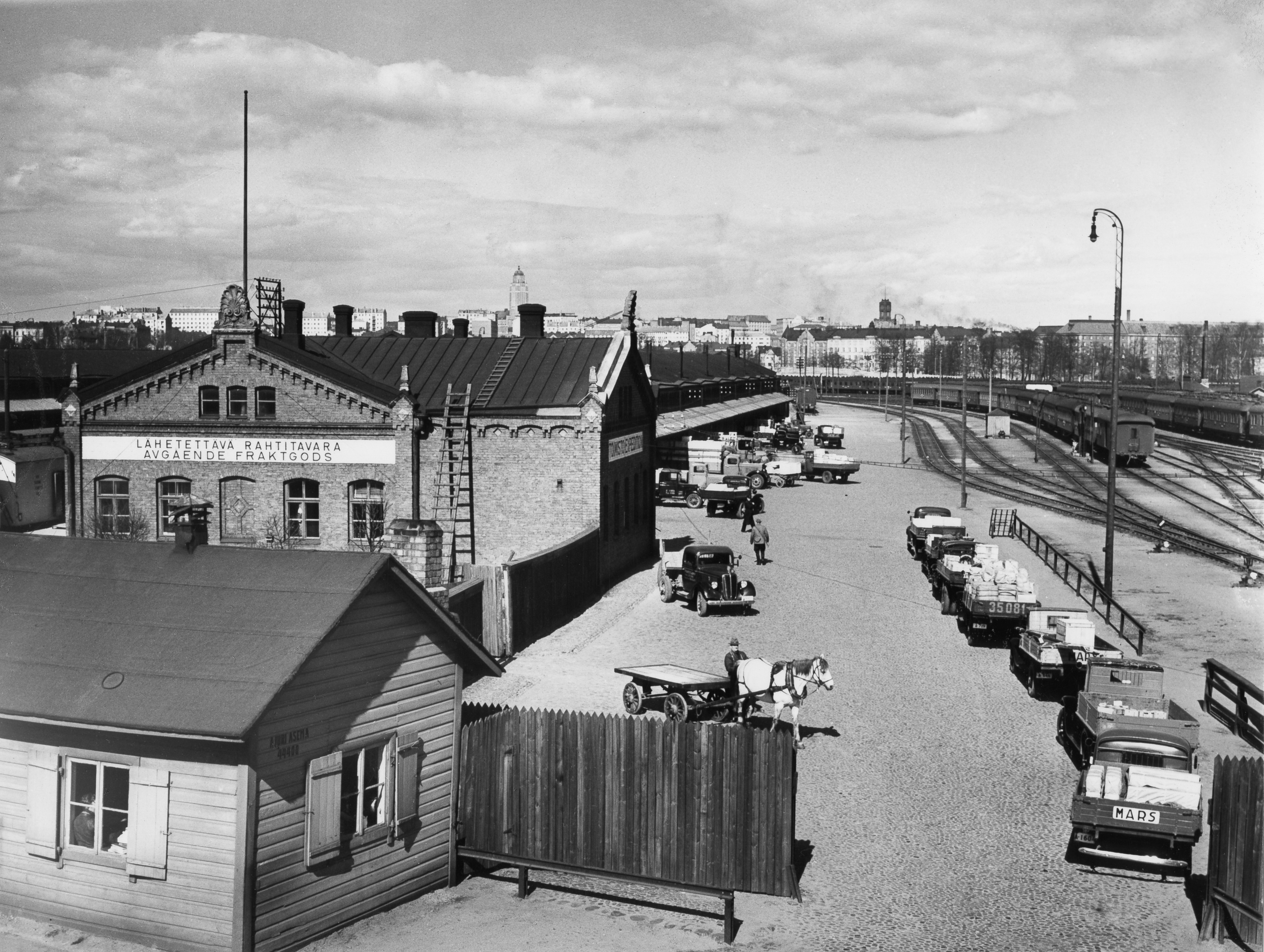
Departing cargo

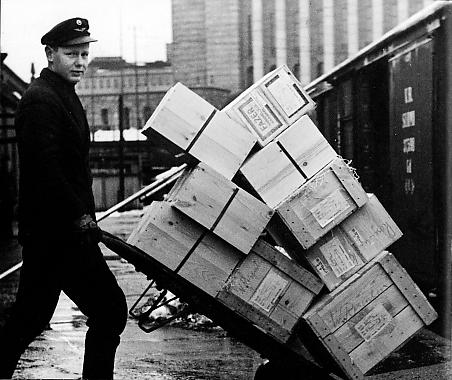
Worker loading a train

As the state railways had decreasing need of the railway yard, it came to be regarded as a waste ground, and the City of Helsinki began to promote new uses for the site, and in 1985 held an architecture-city planning competition for the area. The results again proved inconclusive and the area was since developed piecemeal. In a stage II plan for an extension to Kiasma, American architect Steven Holl proposed a park-feature spreading directly north from his own building and cutting directly through the warehouses. The idea plan was never taken any further.

The warehouses included a couple of ecological shops and band rehearsal studios. They were also a popular location for regular flea markets. Various music concerts, including the Tuska heavy metal festival in 1999 and 2000 and the Jyrki Video Awards in 2001–2003 were often held at the warehouses. In 2004 and 2005 they hosted Perv Park, Helsinki's biggest BDSM convention.

By the mid-2000s, the warehouses had been under a threat of demolition for almost a decade to make way for a new Helsinki Music Centre concert hall. In early 2006, a decision was finally made to construct the Music Hall on the site, preserving only a small section of the warehouses for use as a pavilion-type cafe within the park surrounding the concert hall.

=== May 2006 fires ===
In the aftermath of the EuroMayDay riots on 1 May 2006, a group of young people decided to set up bonfires between the warehouses. The fire almost got to the warehouses, and when the fire department tried to put it out, they were attacked by a group of people. Riot police were dispatched to protect the firemen, and they also had stones thrown at them.

On Friday 5 May 2006, the older southern warehouse was badly damaged by a blazing fire. The building was totally gutted as the fire left just the brick walls standing. The fire drew in large crowds during a pleasant sunny evening.

It was widely believed at first that the fire was a case of arson. However, police concluded in July 2006 that it had been accidental, caused either by a firework or a discarded cigarette that smouldered for several hours before suddenly breaking out across a large part of the building.

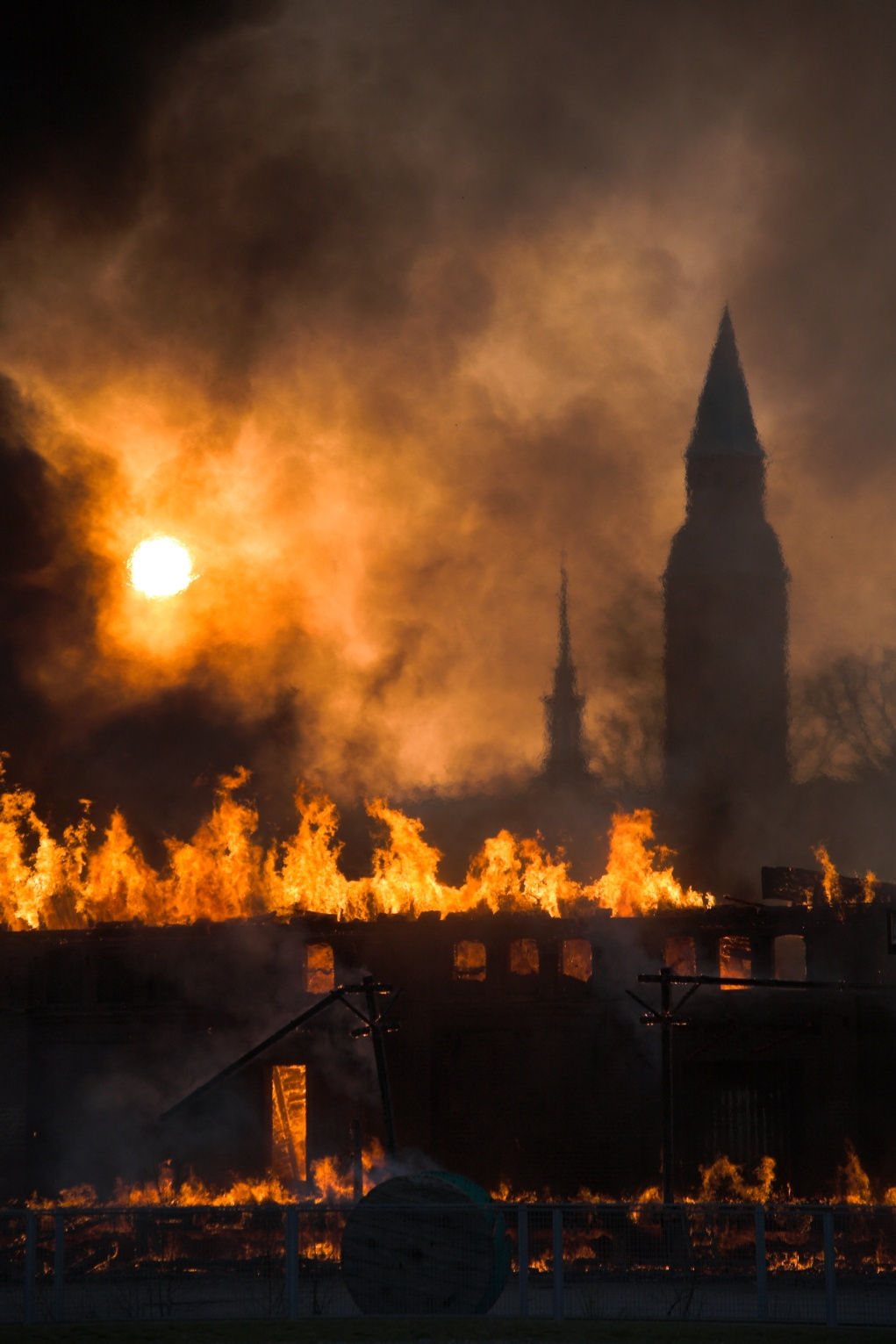
The VR warehouses burning on 5 May 2006 with the National Museum in the distance.

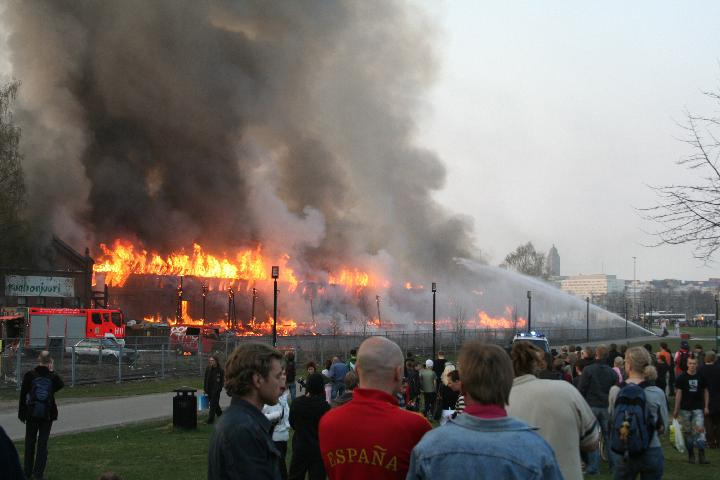
The crowd watches as the fire is extinguished.

== Demolition ==
The demolition work began as planned on 8 May 2006 with forensic examination still going on at the site. A small section at the end of the southern warehouse damaged by the fire was planned to be preserved and used as a pavilion-like cafe extension to the concert hall. This viewpoint was contrary, however, to many people's wishes to preserve the warehouses in their entirety due to their perceived historical and communal value. However, in August 2006, the Finnish police mistakenly ordered the demolition of the protected section. A small part of the warehouses was preserved. It was demolished in 2018.

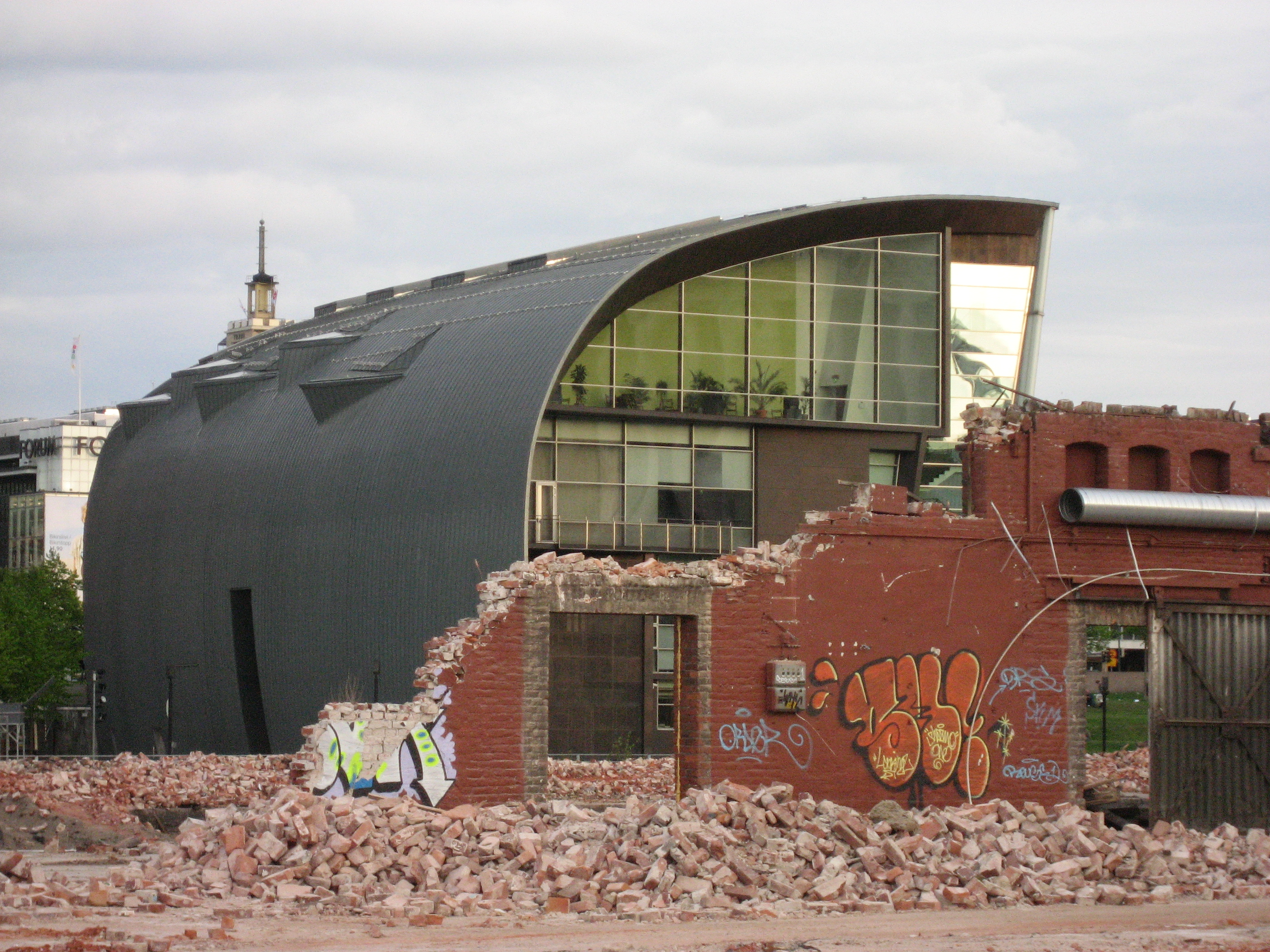
The warehouses under demolition on 1 June 2006. The Kiasma Museum of Contemporary Art in the background.

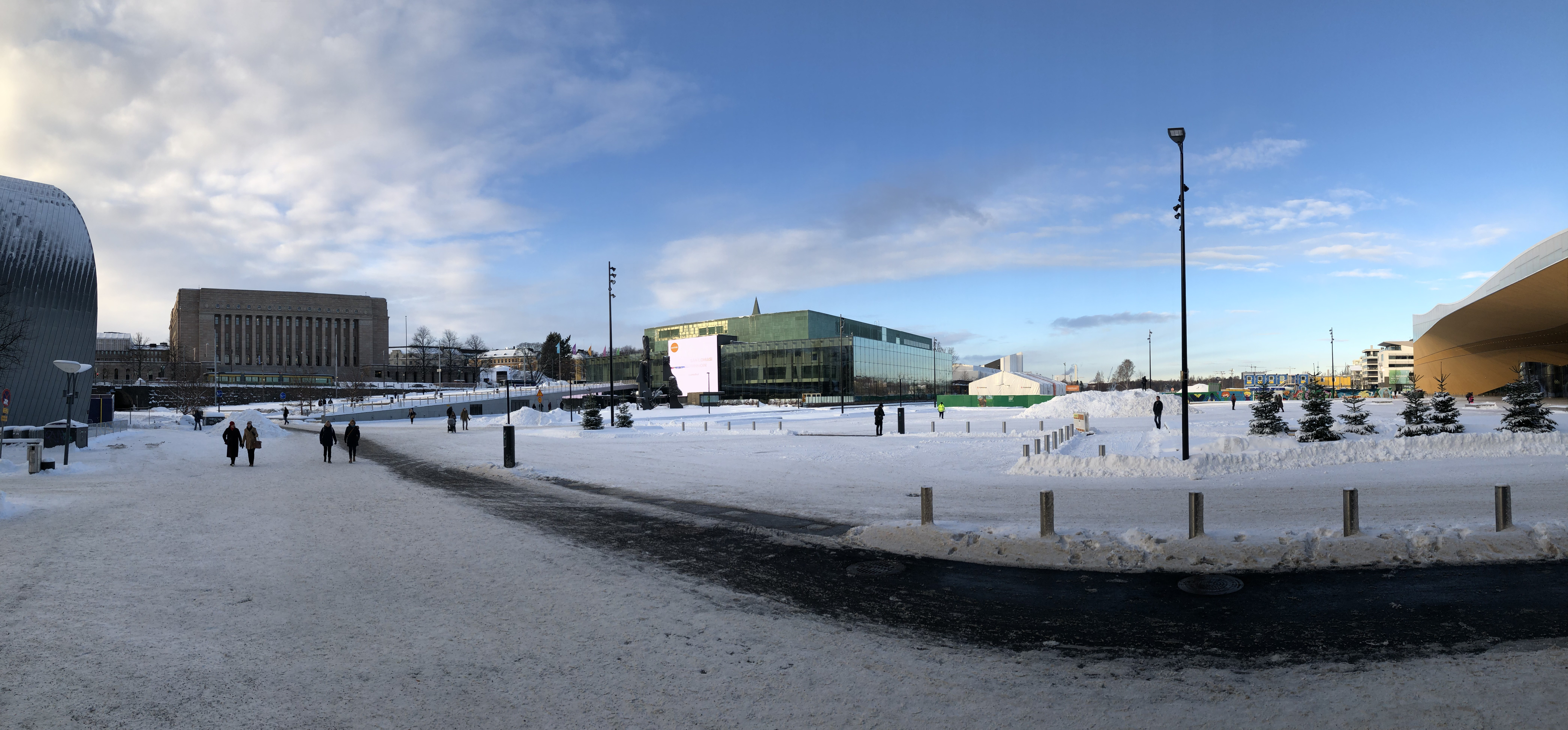
Kansalaistori Square, with Helsinki Music Centre in the center and Parliament House on the left

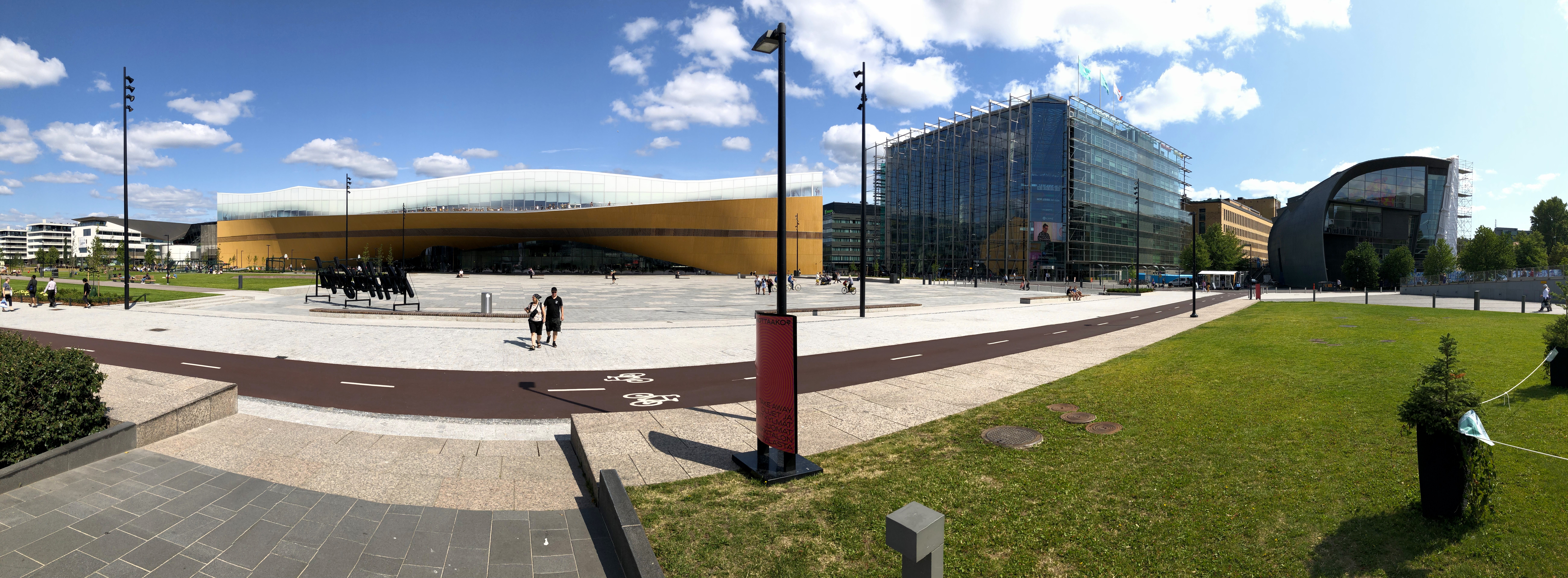
The square from the west facing Helsinki Central Library Oodi, with Sanoma House and Kiasma on the right

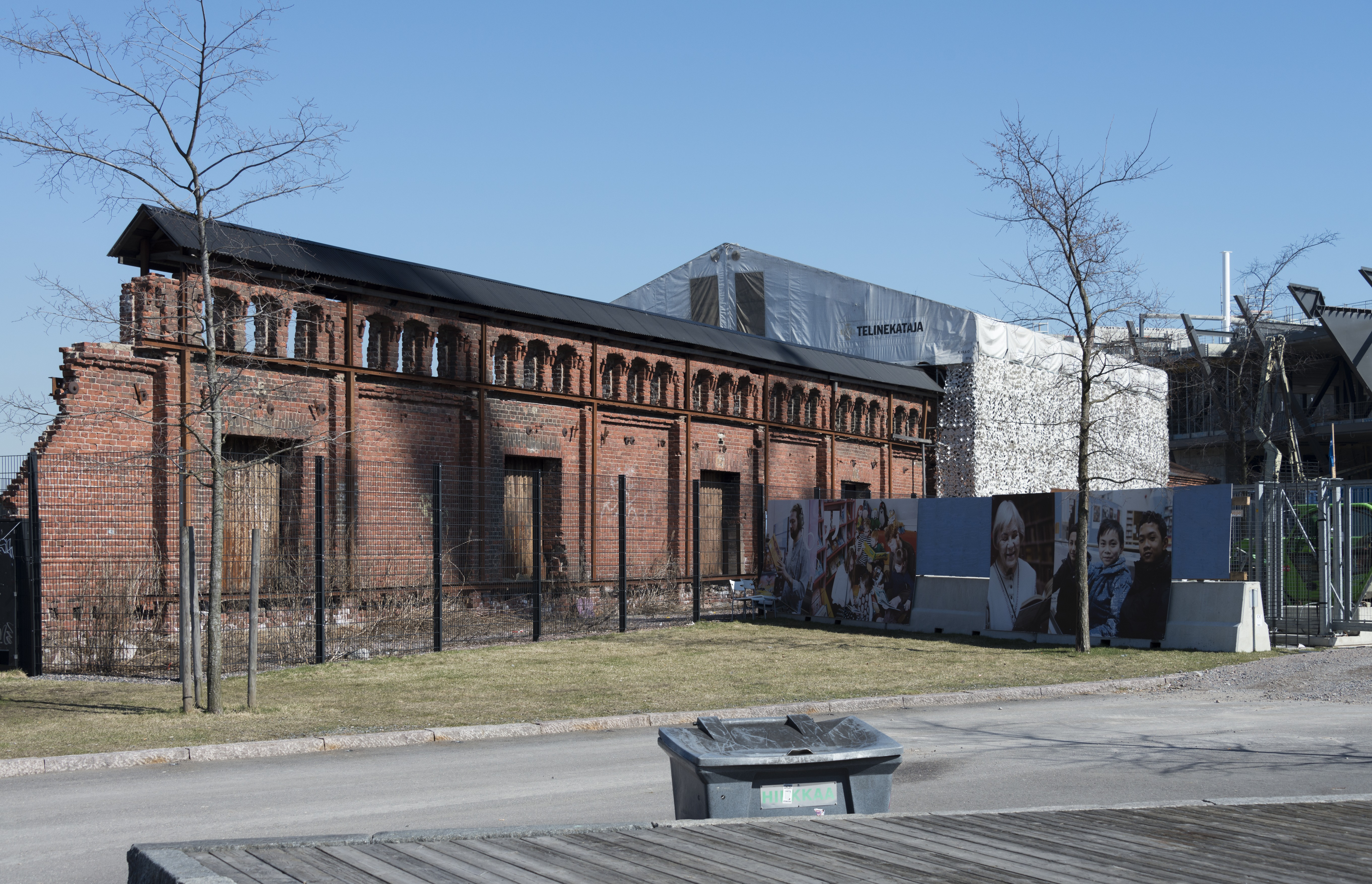
The ruins of the warehouses in 2017, one year before demolition.
