= Lennart Rönnback =

- Born: 21 May 1905; Finland
- Died: 4 November 2007 (aged 102)

Lennart Rönnback (21 May 1905 – 4 November 2007) was a Finnish White Guard veteran of the Finnish Civil War of 1918. Rönnback died on 4 November 2007, at the age of 102. He was considered the last White Guard veteran of the Finnish Civil War at the time of his death, but later Lauri Nurminen was discovered. See Last Red Guard and White Guard here.

== Biography ==
He was originally from Vaasa, but was soon after orphaned and was looked after by his aunt. In January 1918, at the age of twelve, he participated in the defense of Vaasa from Russian forces. After the war ended, he worked as a barber, before eventually rejoining the military and fighting in the Winter War and the Continuation War, eventually reaching the rank of master conscript.

== Personal life ==
He lived in Jakobstad.
