= Voitto Liukkonen =

Finnish sports commentator

- Born: 19 July 1940
- Died: 26 December 2007 (aged 67)
- Occupation: sports broadcaster

Voitto "Vode" Liukkonen (19 July 1940 – Mikkeli; 26 December 2007 Tampere) was a Finnish sports commentator who worked for Finland's National Broadcasting Company, YLE. He was especially known for his minimalistic style of commentating.

From 1973 to 2002 Liukkonen worked for the sports section of YLE TV2. He was one of the commentators for both the Summer and Winter Olympic Games. His main sports were rowing, kayaking and tennis. Beginning with the 1998 Winter Olympics he also commentated curling. In the 1960s, Liukkonen himself was a kayaker at the national level.

Liukkonen's biggest career moments were Pertti Karppinen's Olympic gold medal in rowing at the Montreal 1976, Moscow 1980 and in Los Angeles 1984 Olympics. In Los Angeles, he was also the commentator for Jouko Salomäki's gold medal victory in Greco-Roman wrestling. For Winter sports, Liukkonen commentated Matti Nykänen's first World Champion victory in large hill in Oslo 1982 and Marjo Matikainen's Olympic gold medal victory in women's 5 km skiing in Calgary 1988. At the Barcelona 1992 games, he was the commentator when Mikko Kolehmainen won the gold medal in K-1 500 metres kayaking. After his retirement, Liukkonen made a comeback and commentated curling in the Olympics. The biggest moment of his curling commentating career was the Olympic silver medal won by Markku Uusipaavalniemi's team in Torino 2006.
