= Pentti Pakarinen =

Finnish politician

Pentti Lassi Pellervo Pakarinen (29 August 1924 – 27 December 2007) was a Finnish ophthalmologist and politician, born in Oulu. He was a Member of the Parliament of Finland, representing the People's Party of Finland from 1962 to 1965 and the Liberal People's Party from 1965 to 1966.
