= Tarja Halonen =

Finnish politician, President of Finland (born 1943)

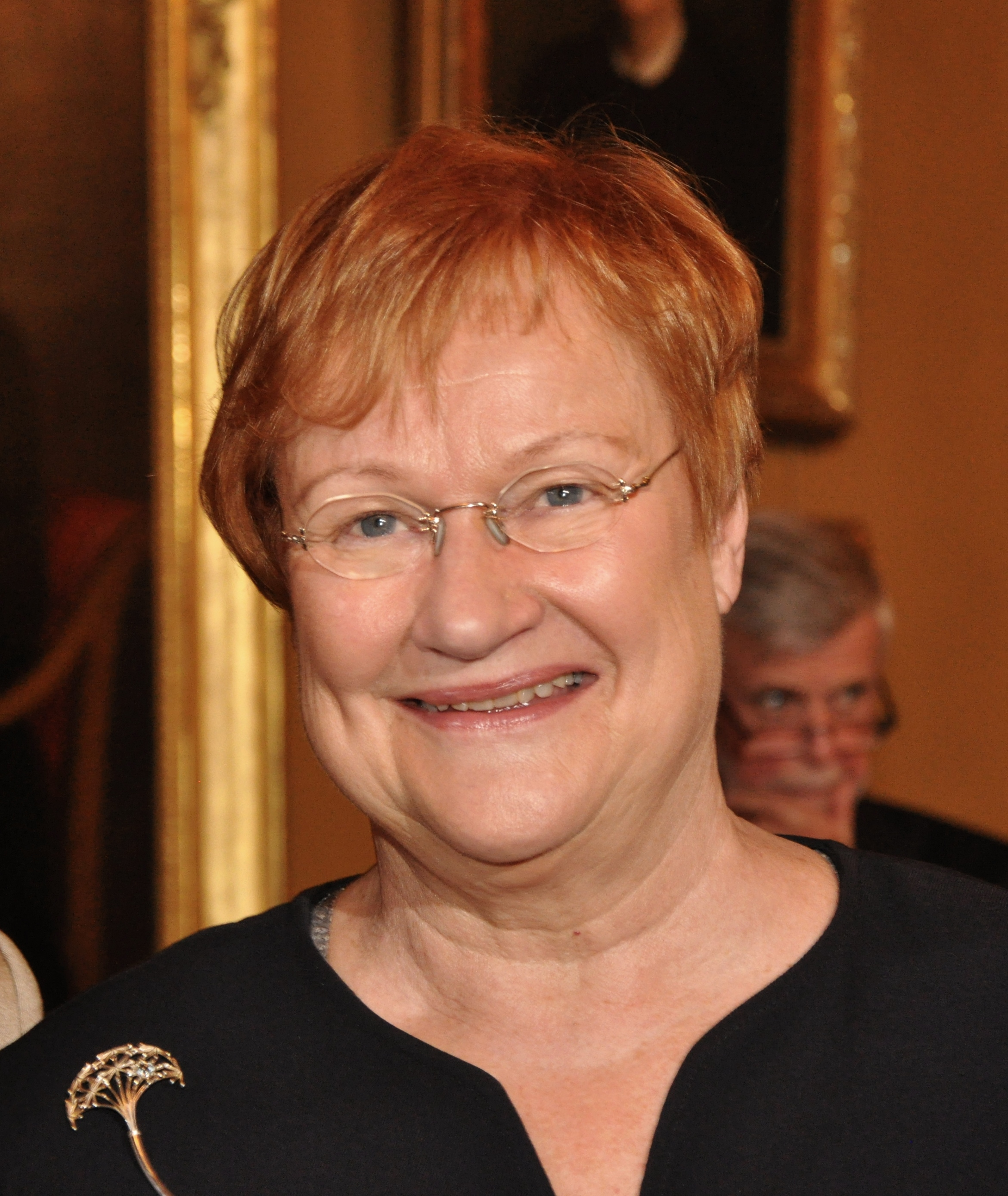
- Halonen in 2011

11th President of Finland
- In office 1 March 2000 – 1 March 2012
- Prime Minister: Paavo Lipponen; Anneli Jäätteenmäki; Matti Vanhanen; Mari Kiviniemi; Jyrki Katainen
- Preceded by: Martti Ahtisaari
- Succeeded by: Sauli Niinistö

Minister of Foreign Affairs
- In office 13 April 1995 – 25 February 2000
- Prime Minister: Paavo Lipponen
- Preceded by: Paavo Rantanen
- Succeeded by: Erkki Tuomioja

Minister of Justice
- In office 28 February 1990 – 26 April 1991
- Prime Minister: Harri Holkeri
- Preceded by: Matti Louekoski
- Succeeded by: Hannele Pokka

Member of the Finnish Parliament
- In office 24 March 1979 – 29 February 2000
- Succeeded by: Ilkka Taipale
- Constituency: Helsinki

Personal details
- Born: Tarja Kaarina Halonen; 24 December 1943 (age 82) Helsinki, Finland
- Party: Social Democratic
- Spouse: Pentti Arajärvi (m. 2000)
- Children: Anna Halonen
- Education: University of Helsinki
- Website: Official website

Tarja Kaarina Halonen (Note: Finnish pronunciation: [ˈtɑrjɑ (ˈkɑːrinɑ) ˈhɑlonen]) (born 24 December 1943) is a Finnish politician who served as the president of Finland, and the first and to date only woman to hold the position in Finland, from 2000 to 2012. She first rose to prominence as a lawyer with the Central Organisation of Finnish Trade Unions (SAK), and as the prime minister's parliamentary secretary (1974–1975) and a member of the City Council of Helsinki (1977–1996). Halonen was a Social Democratic Party member of parliament from 1979 until her election to the presidency in 2000. She also served as a minister at the Ministry of Social Affairs and Health from 1987 to 1990, as Minister of Justice from 1990 to 1991, and as Minister for Foreign Affairs from 1995 to 2000.

Halonen was an extremely popular president, with her approval ratings reaching a peak of 88 percent in December 2003. She was re-elected in 2006, defeating National Coalition Party candidate Sauli Niinistö in the second round by 51% to 48%. Ineligible to run in the 2012 presidential elections because of term limits, Halonen left office on 1 March 2012 and was succeeded by Niinistö.

Widely known for her interest in human rights issues, Halonen served as the chairperson of the Finnish LGBT rights organization Seta in the 1980s, and she actively participated in the discussion of issues such as women's rights and the problems of globalization during her presidency. In 2006, she was mentioned by various commentators as a potential candidate for the United Nations Secretary-General selection, but she denied an interest at that time, stating that she wanted to finish her term as president before thinking about other career options. In 2009, Forbes named her among the 100 most powerful women in the world.

Halonen is a member of the Council of Women World Leaders, an international network of current and former women presidents and prime ministers whose mission is to mobilize the highest-level women leaders globally for collective action on issues of critical importance to women and equitable development.

Since the death of Martti Ahtisaari in 2023, Halonen is currently the oldest living former president of Finland.

== Early life and career ==
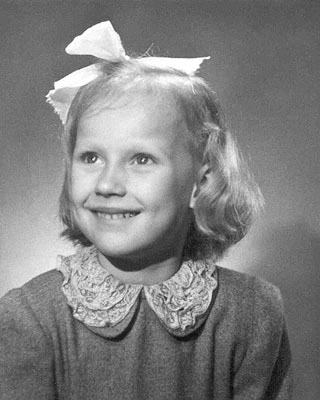
5-year-old Tarja Halonen in 1948

Tarja Halonen was born on 24 December 1943 in the district of Kallio, which at the time was a traditional working-class area in central Helsinki. Her mother Lyyli Elina Loimola was a set-dresser and her father Vieno Olavi Halonen worked as a welder. Halonen's parents married at the beginning of World War II and Tarja was born a few years later. Vieno Halonen was at the frontline during the Continuation War and Lyyli Halonen was working in a shoe factory when their daughter was born. When Halonen was two years old, her father Vieno Halonen went to the kiosk to buy a magazine and no longer returned home to his family. Halonen has not commented much on the incident since, but Halonen's parents officially divorced in 1948. Vieno Halonen was an award-winning soldier who fought in the 26th Infantry Regiment, so-called Ace Regiment. Vieno Halonen was wounded three times during the war and after the war he was awarded first, second and fourth class Order of the Cross of Liberty medals. In later interviews, Tarja Halonen has said that she has met her father only a few times.

After the divorce, in 1950, Lyyli Halonen married her new husband Thure Forss, who worked as an electrician and was very active in the working-class community. Both Halonen's mother and her stepfather influenced her world view extensively. Halonen later said that her mother was a true survivor, always an extremely active and resilient person who valued good, honest and modest hardworking people. When she entered politics, Halonen stated that these are also the qualities and attributes she respects in people.

In 1950 she began her studies in Kallio Elementary school from where she later moved to Kallio Gymnasium and finally finished her matriculation examination in 1962. She began to study Art History in the University of Helsinki in 1962 but in autumn 1963 she changed her studies to law, and obtained her Master of Laws degree in 1968 specializing in criminal law.

She began to work as a lawyer, already before obtaining her degree, in a credit surveillance company Luotonvalvonta oy in 1967. After working there for a few years, she was hired by the National Union of University Students in Finland to work as a Social Affairs and General Secretary from 1969 to 1970. Her work in the Union spurred her interest in politics, and in 1970 she obtained a post as a lawyer in the Central Organisation of Finnish Trade Unions, being the first female ever to work as a lawyer in the Union.

== Political career: 1970–2000 ==
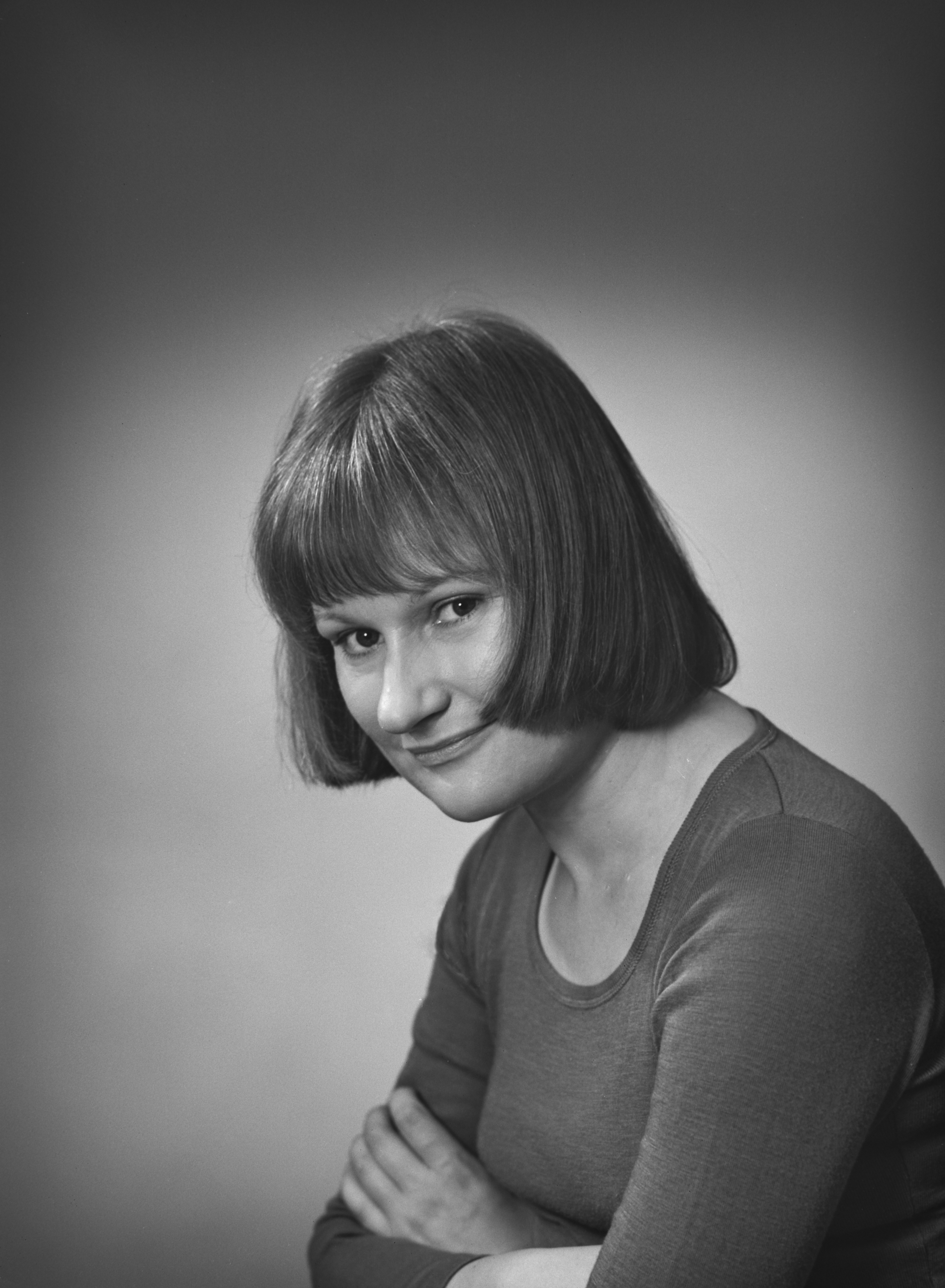
Tarja Halonen in 1975, working Finnish Parliamentary Secretary to the Prime Minister.

=== Trade unionist ===
In 1971, Halonen joined the Social Democratic Party which had close ties with the trade unions in which she worked as a lawyer from 1970 to 1974.

In early 1970, she was elected to represent Central Organisation of Finnish Trade Unions in a committee that called for the recognition of East Germany. Later she became the Vice-President of the committee, which lobbied then-President Urho Kekkonen. During the presidential elections of 2006 she was criticized by rivals for this. She responded that the committee was formed by members from many different political parties including conservative parties. In 1973, Finland recognized both East Germany and West Germany as sovereign states.

=== First elections ===
In 1974, Prime Minister Kalevi Sorsa appointed Halonen as his parliamentary secretary. Sorsa later said that he wanted his parliamentary secretary to have good ties with the trade unions of Finland and have skills in jurisprudence.

Working in Parliament made Halonen more interested in politics and she decided to take part in the municipal elections of 1976. She was elected to the City Council of Helsinki, a position she held continuously for five terms from 1977 to 1996. Additionally in 1979, she was elected into Parliament as a representative of the Helsinki constituency. She served five full terms and less than a year of her sixth term in Parliament until her inauguration as president in 2000. In Parliament, her first formal post was as the chairman of the Social Committee, which she held from 1984 to 1987.

=== Ministerial career ===
In 1987, Halonen was appointed Minister of Social Affairs and Health by Prime Minister Harri Holkeri. Halonen held the position until 1990. In addition to this, she served as Minister for Nordic Cooperation from 1989 to 1991, the same year in which she was also appointed the chairman of the International Solidarity Foundation, a post she relinquished in 2000.

From 1990 to 1991, she served as Minister of Justice, and from 1995 until her election to the presidency, she served as the Minister of Foreign Affairs in the Lipponen I Cabinet.

== Presidential campaign ==
=== 2000 presidential campaign ===
Halonen announced in 1999 that she wished to stand as a candidate for president in the 2000 presidential elections. In the preliminary elections of the Social Democrats, Halonen ran against Pertti Paasio, a member of the European Parliament and former party chairman, and Jacob Söderman, the European Ombudsman. The incumbent, Martti Ahtisaari, refused to run in party preliminaries and thus announced that he would not run for a second term. Halonen won the preliminaries by a landslide, getting 7,800 out of 12,800 votes.

Halonen was a surprising candidate as she did not represent many traditional values: she was known as a left-wing social democratic party member, who lived in a domestic partnership, was a single parent and had resigned from the national church. Despite starting from fourth place in the presidential election polls, in the first round of the elections, Halonen received the most votes, 40.0%. Her nearest opponent, former prime minister Esko Aho of the Centre Party, received 34.4% of votes.

Since neither of the two candidates got over 50% of the votes, a second round was held. In the second round, Halonen narrowly defeated her opponent with 51.6% against 48.4%, thus becoming Finland's first female head of state. Her first term began on 1 March 2000.

=== 2006 presidential campaign ===
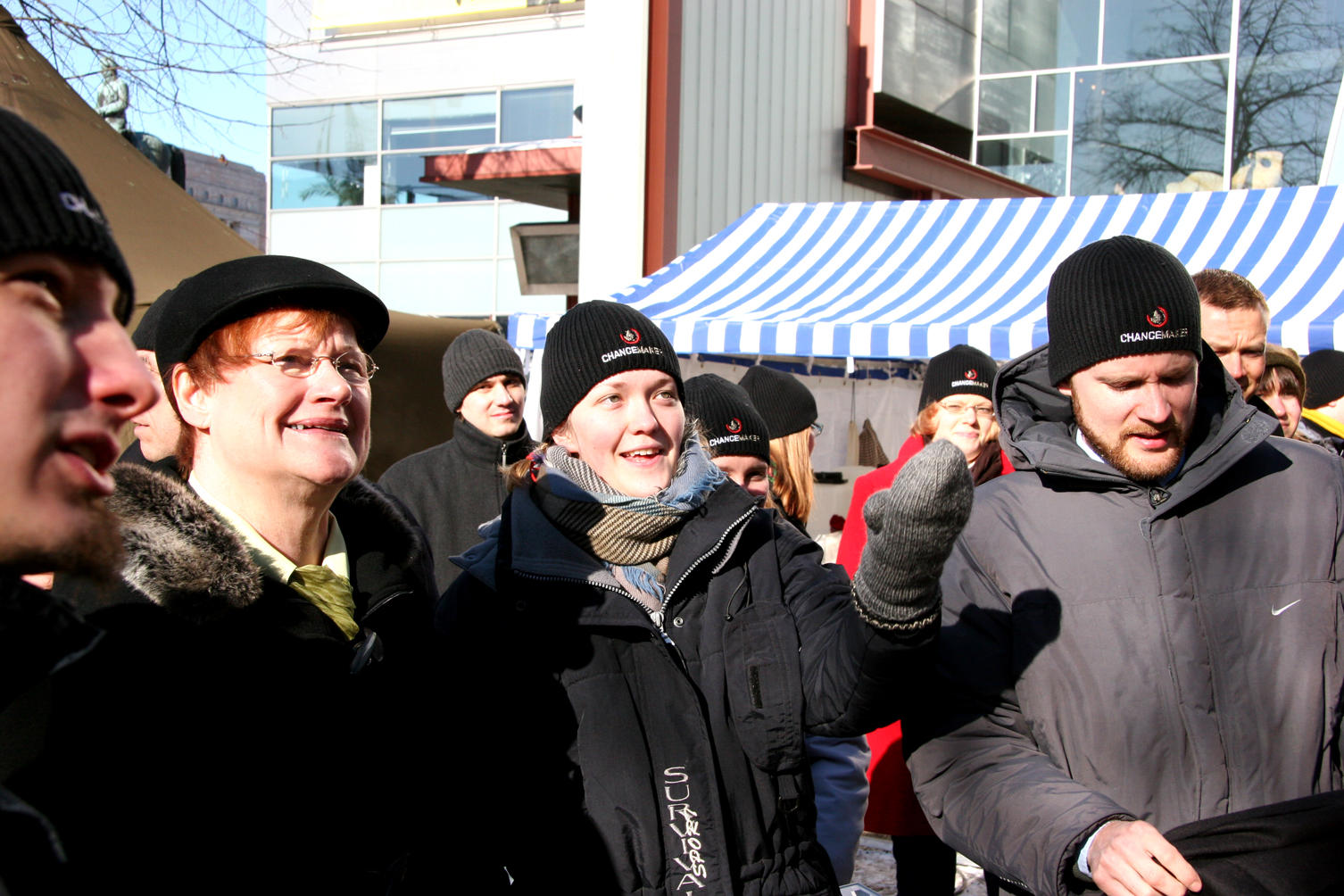
Halonen in March 2005

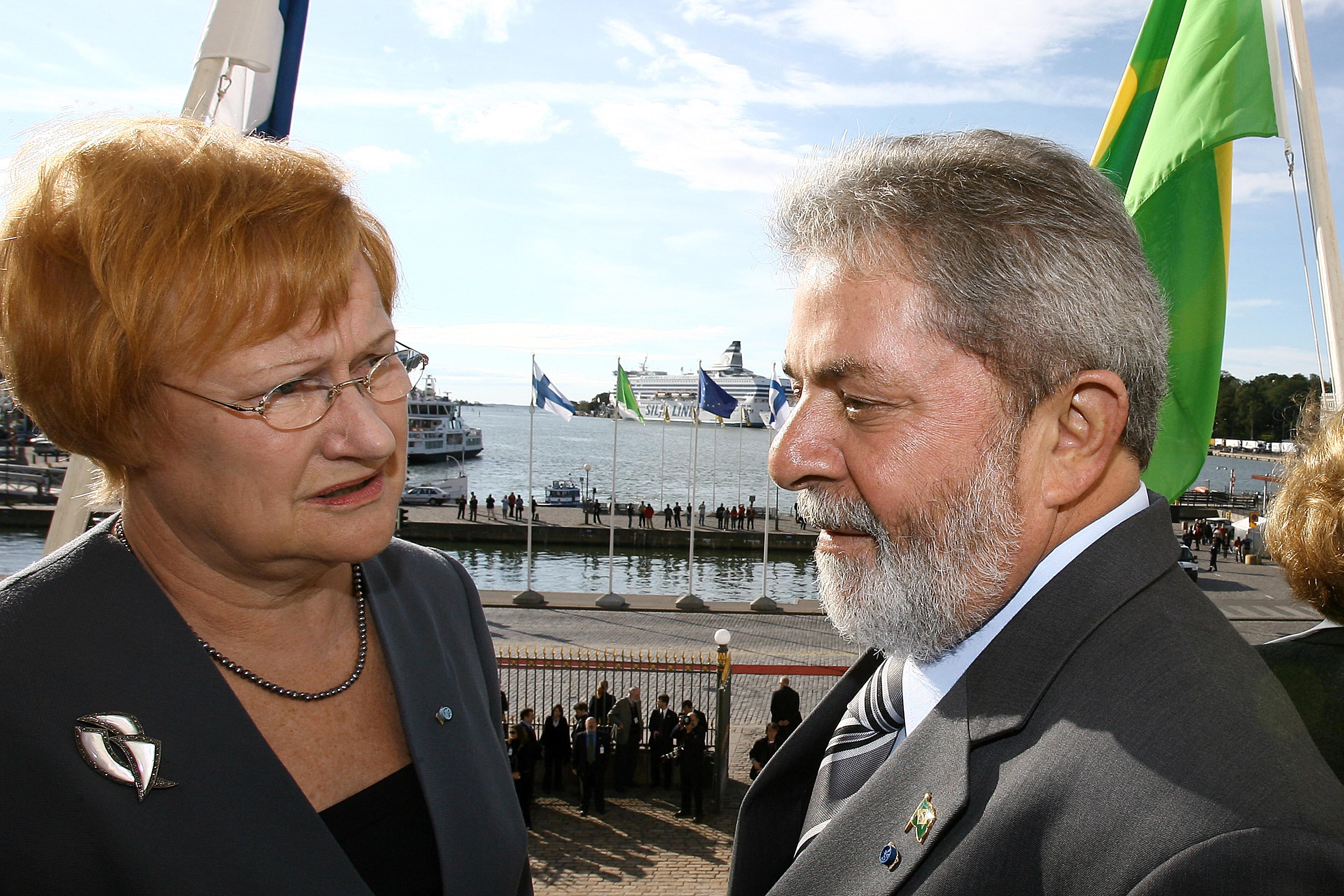
Halonen together with Luiz Inácio Lula da Silva, then President of Brazil.

On 20 May 2005, Halonen held a press conference in Mäntyniemi where she announced her willingness to run for a second term. Officially, this was the desired answer for the SDP delegation that had visited her two days earlier. In addition to her own party's support, the leader of the Left Alliance, Suvi-Anne Siimes, gave her support for Halonen's future campaign.

SAK openly lobbied for her re-election. It used its members' money on mudslinging campaigns on behalf of Halonen. In those flyers, "Niinistö is presented as the horror of worker, whereas SAK-supported Halonen is like a worker's dream". Halonen said she approved of the flyers.

A study analyzed newspaper articles and concluded that the main newspaper Helsingin Sanomat produced almost exclusively positive tone stories about Halonen and much more negative tone articles about candidates Niinistö, Vanhanen and Hautala.

American talk show host Conan O'Brien made recurring jokes about Halonen on his show, Late Night with Conan O'Brien, because of his own resemblance to her. He endorsed Halonen and produced humorous mock campaign ads and attack ads against her opponents. He went as far as visiting Finland and meeting Halonen.

On 19 November 2005, the SDP's party council meeting was held; praised as "the president of the whole nation", she was unanimously chosen as the presidential candidate. Shortly thereafter, the party council of the Left Alliance gave the party's official support to Halonen.

Halonen's received 46% of the first round vote in the election. Sauli Niinistö (of the National Coalition Party) was second with 24%. They faced each other in a runoff on 29 January 2006, where Halonen was re-elected with 51.8% of the vote against Mr. Niinistö's 48.2%. The re-election was a close call. She led in the advance voting, but she eventually received fewer votes on the actual voting day than Mr. Niinistö did.

== Presidency ==
=== First term: 2000–2006 ===
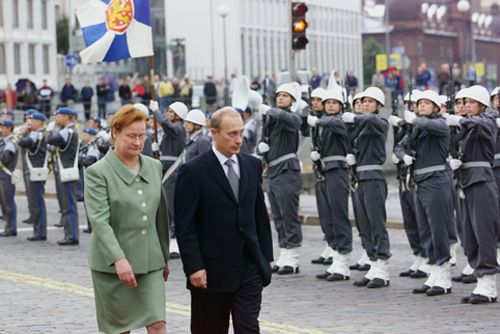
Russian president Vladimir Putin and Tarja Halonen in Helsinki, 2–3 September 2001.

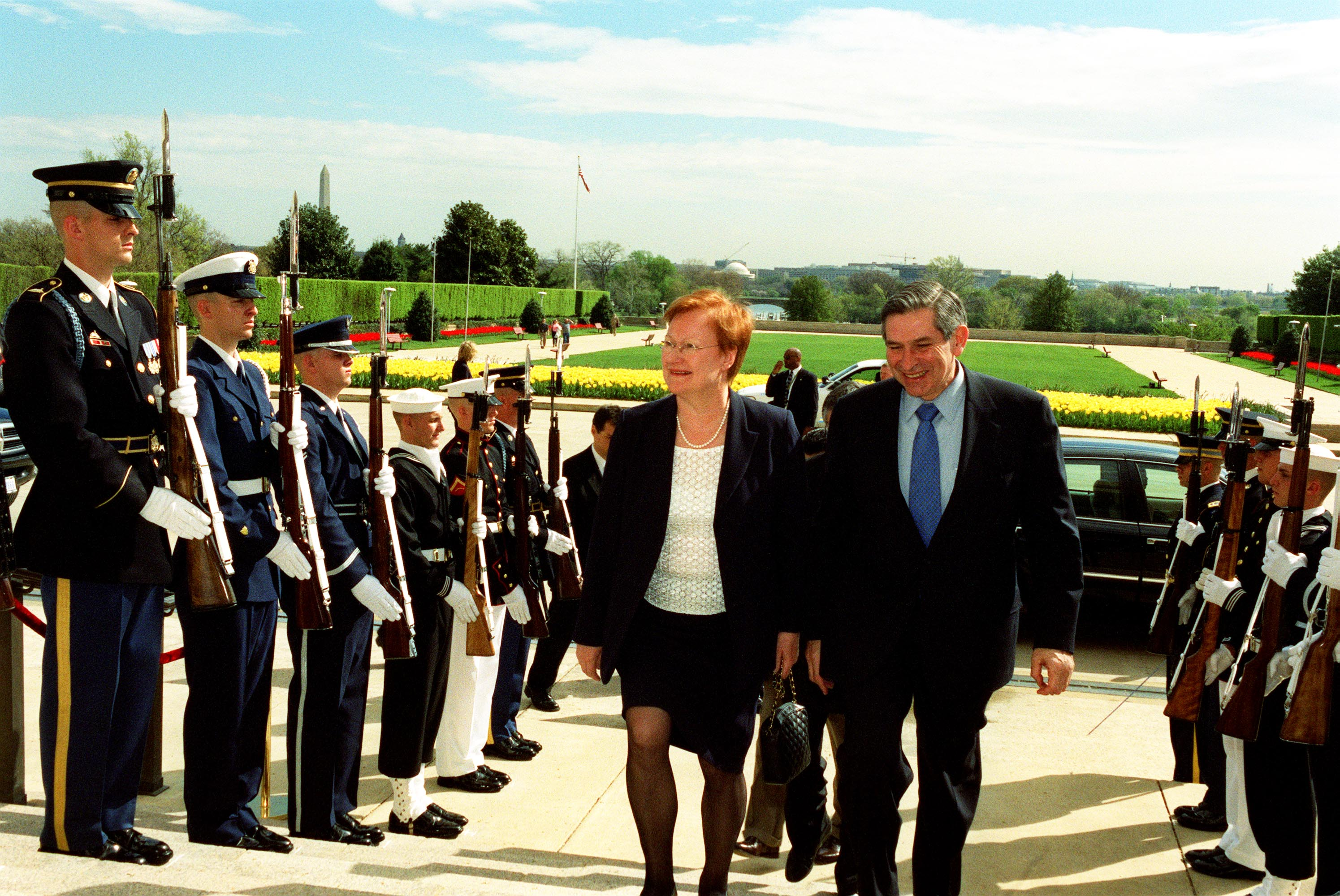
Tarja Halonen and Paul Wolfowitz in 2002

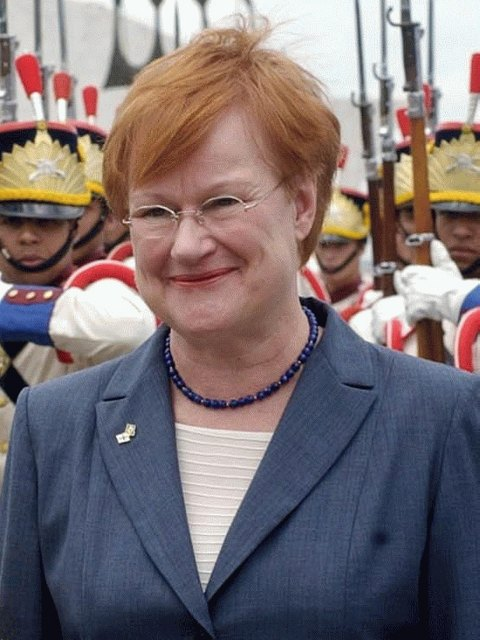
Halonen visit to Brazil, in October 2003

After her narrow election victory in the first election, Halonen's approval ratings rose and reached a peak of 88% in December 2003.

In a 2001 interview Halonen said that she was worried about the Russian response if NATO approved membership bids by Baltic countries. Latvian president Vaira Vike-Freiberga asked what she meant and whether Halonen is actively opposing NATO membership of Baltic countries.

In the Iraqgate scandal, Halonen's advisor Martti Manninen leaked confidential documents to the Centre Party leader Anneli Jäätteenmäki, who had become prime minister. The revelations led to the resignation of Jäätteenmäki.

Halonen has opposed the use of landmines in Finnish military doctrine.

Halonen has defended cluster bombs and did not sign a treaty which would have banned Finland from using these kinds of weapons.

=== Second term: 2006–2012 ===
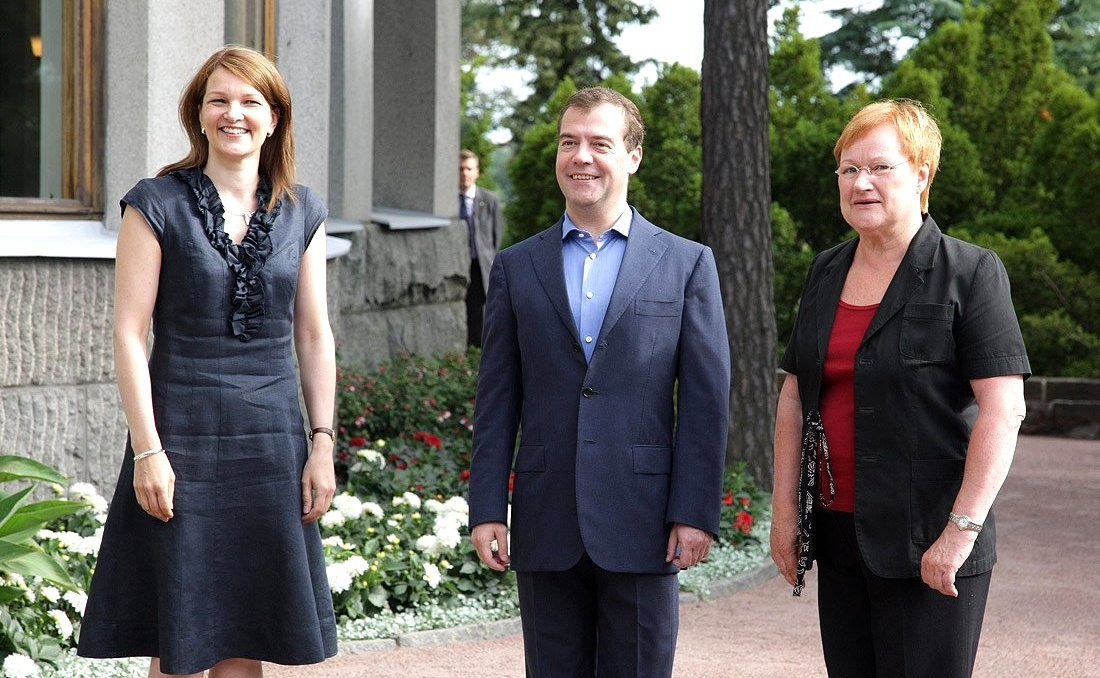
Tarja Halonen (right) meeting with the third President of Russia Dmitry Medvedev and the then prime minister of Finland Mari Kiviniemi (left) in 2010.

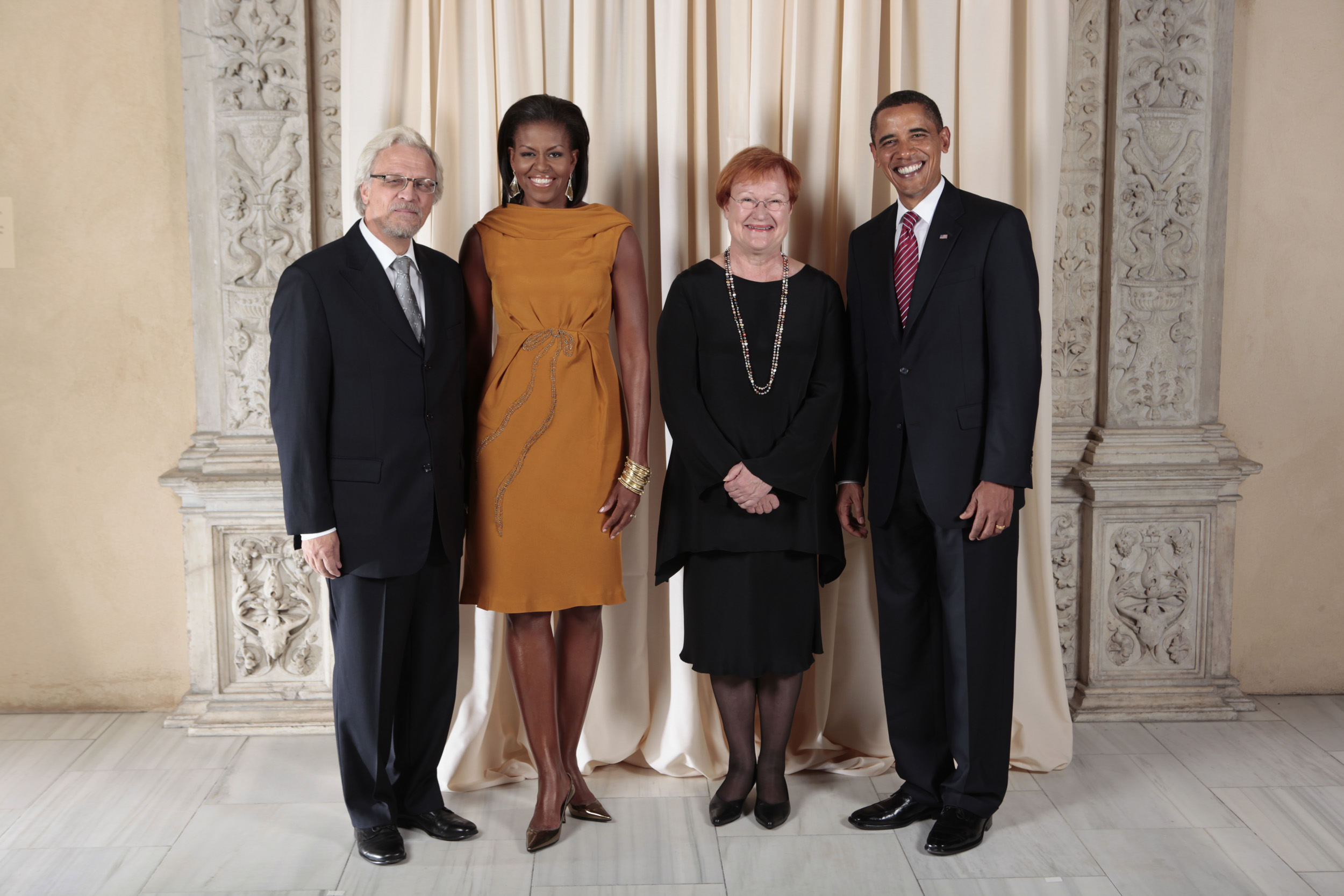
President Halonen and Pentti Arajärvi with US President Barack Obama and Michelle Obama on 2009 in New York.

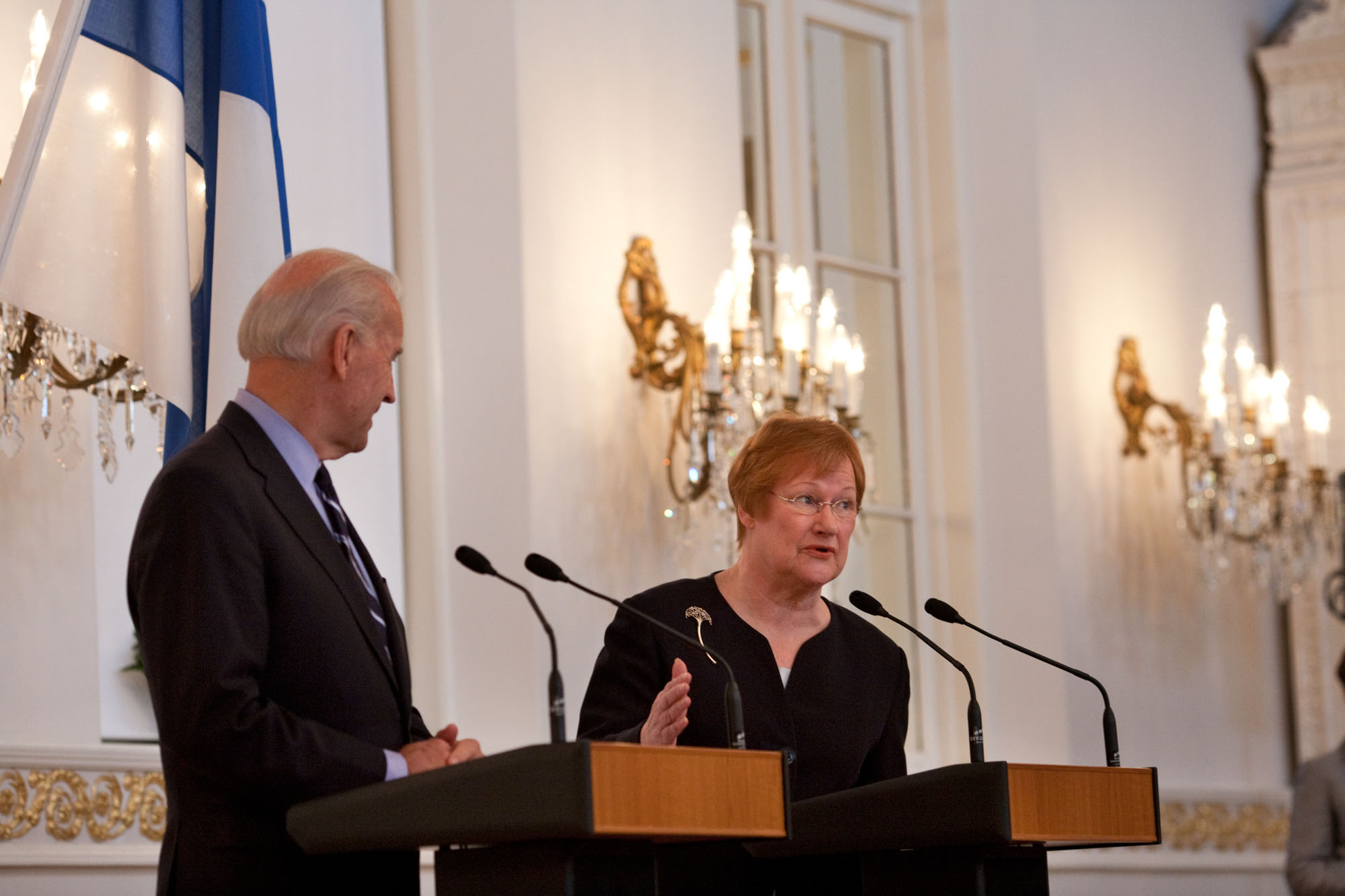
US Vice President Joe Biden and President Halonen on March 8, 2011 in Helsinki.

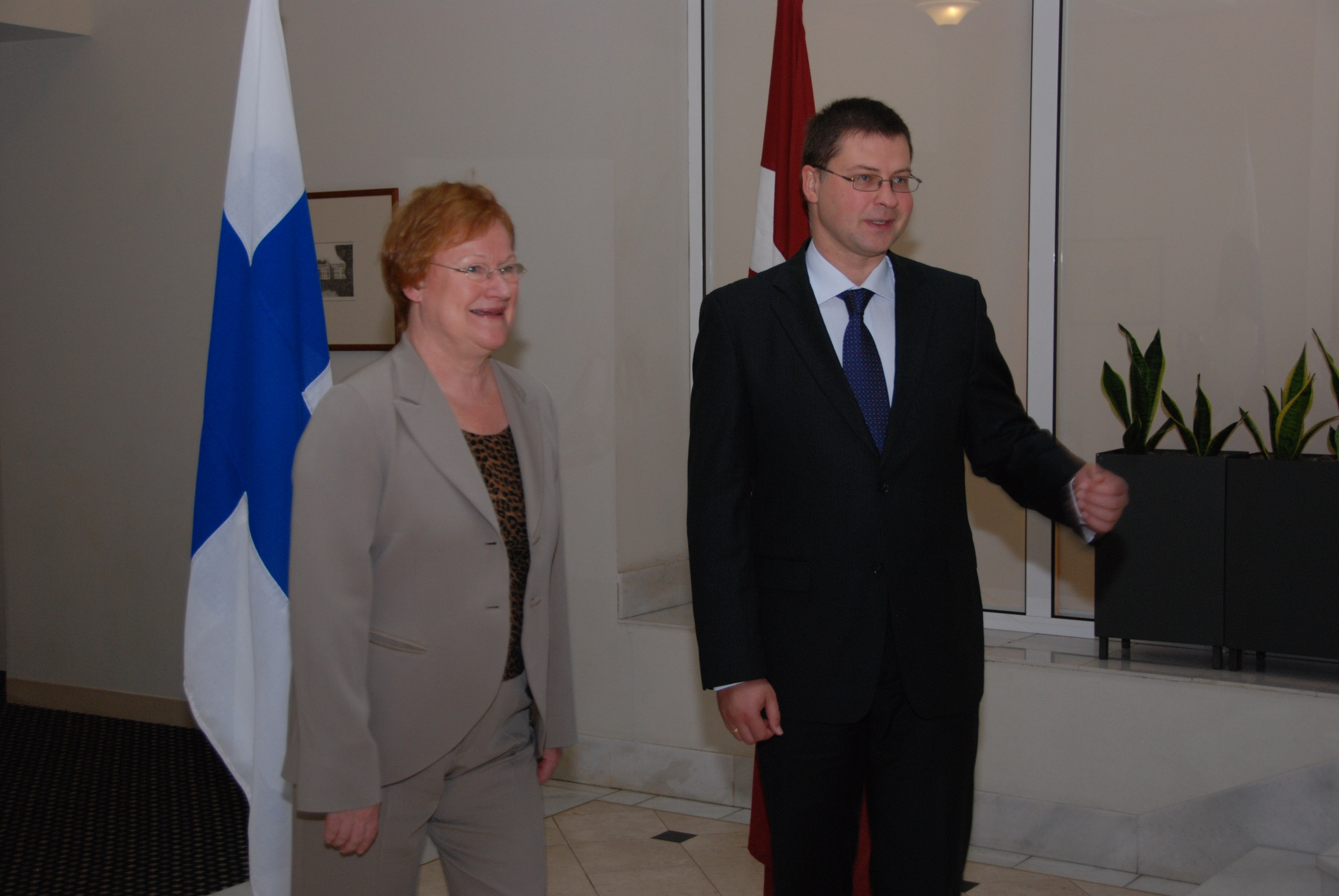
Tarja Halonen with Prime Minister of Latvia Valdis Dombrovskis

In 2008, Halonen nominated SDP-affiliated Ritva Viljanen for a second term in the Ministry of the Interior. The government had nominated Ilkka Laitinen. Over the course of the previous 50 years, the president had only once chosen to not obey the government's consensus, leading to Halonen thusly being accused of cronyism.

In September 2008, Halonen was perceived as insulting Estonia by saying that the Estonians suffer from a "post-Soviet stress condition". President of Estonia Toomas Hendrik Ilves commented on the issue, saying that "Estonia has never condemned, and will not condemn the foreign affairs decisions of another EU country. It will also not assess the psychiatric state of other EU countries". In 2009, Halonen rejected calls to apologize for Finland's attitude towards Estonian independence from the Soviet Union in 1991.

At the end of her second term Halonen's presidency and economic views received harsh criticism from Björn Wahlroos, the chairman of the two largest banks in Finland.

== Political views ==
Early in her political career Halonen represented the far-left wing of the SDP. She publicly opposed the proposed free trade agreement of the European Economic Community in 1973, by signing a petition along with 500 other prominent social democrats and socialists. Otherwise she was loyal to President Kekkonen's foreign policy, which was founded on Finnish neutrality and good relations with the Soviet Union. Markku Salomaa's 2021 book Tarza – Pasifistin odysseia voimapolitiikan maailmassa states that Chancellor Angela Merkel had a very negative attitude towards Halonen, precisely because of her pro-Soviet and far-left wing world of ideas. Since 2004, rumors have been circulating on Internet that Halonen gave a May Day speech at Hakaniemi Market Square in 1976 and hoped that Finland would join the Soviet Union, saying: "Finland would be blessed to join the Soviet Union by peaceful means. At the same time, we would get rid of the yoke of capitalism, because capitalism will die in 20 years. Finland, together with the Soviet Union, could be a pioneer towards a communist society." In an interview with STT, Halonen herself has completely rejected the gossip, saying: "I have not given any May Day speech in Hakaniemi in 1976, nor can the text be found in the Informant. And if a Social Democrat SAK lawyer had given such a May Day speech in the 1970s, the employment relationship would have been rather short."

Throughout her political career, Halonen has described herself as a supporter of "international solidarity". She describes herself as a "relative pacifist", meaning that she does not support unilateral disarmament. She has strongly defended the President's role as the commander in chief of the military. She opposed NATO membership during her tenure. Following the 2022 Russian invasion of Ukraine, when Finnish public opinion had turned, and the Parliament had debated the issue and decided, in favor of submitting an application for NATO membership, Halonen also voiced her support on Twitter, calling the move "a necessary measure in the changed security situation in Europe". Her strong stands on these issues have characterised her presidential term and shaped Finnish foreign policy, in part in cooperation with the like-minded former Minister of Foreign Affairs, Erkki Tuomioja.

Halonen has publicly supported the involvement of the Central Organisation of Finnish Trade Unions (SAK) in politics.

The Constitution of Finland and Halonen's decision to take part in some European Union meetings with the prime minister has created the so-called "problem of two dinner plates" in Finland. Since most other countries only have their prime ministers representing them, it was also decided in Finland that the task is reserved for the Prime Minister in most cases.

On 20 March 2013, Halonen publicly voiced her support for same-sex marriage.

== Personal life ==
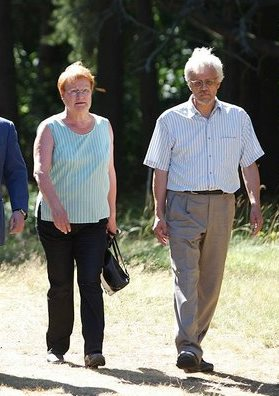
Halonen and her husband Dr. Pentti Arajärvi in 2010.

Halonen says her interests include art history, the theatre and swimming. She says she speaks Finnish, Swedish, and English, and is studying Estonian. Halonen had two cats during her presidential term. After they died, she was given a Neva Masquerade cat in 2013 by Russian prime minister Dmitry Medvedev.

On 26 August 2000, Halonen married her longtime partner, Dr. Pentti Arajärvi, in a civil ceremony at her official residence, Mäntyniemi, after a relationship of more than fifteen years. Halonen's adult daughter Anna, and Arajärvi's adult son Esko, acted as witnesses. Both children are from previous relationships.

She promotes Finland in her personal accoutrements, such as wearing a Moomin watch.

In the 1960s, she left the Evangelical Lutheran Church of Finland, to which the majority of Finns belong, to protest against its policy of taxing church members and its stance against female priests. The church has since accepted women as priests, and Halonen has stated that she has no personal reason not to return to the church but refrains from doing so in order not to give a signal that might be misinterpreted. In the 1990s, Halonen acted as the chairman of Suomen setlementtiliitto, a Christian social work organization. After her presidential term, Halonen rejoined the Evangelical-Lutheran Church. According to her statements, she had previously refrained from it as it might have been considered an attempt to garner political support. Since then, Halonen has even preached publicly in a divine service of her home parish of Kallio. This is a privilege that the parish priest may grant only in exceptional cases to persons known for their Christian conviction.

In 1980–1981 Halonen served as the chairman of Seta, the main LGBT rights organization in Finland.

== Positions ==
- Member of the Social Democratic Party 1971–2000
- Vice-President of the GDR Recognition Committee 1972–1973
- Prime Minister's Parliamentary Secretary 1974–1975
- Member of Helsinki City Council 1977–1996
- Member of Parliament (Helsinki constituency) 1979–2000
- Member of the Parliamentary Social Affairs Committee 1979–1986 (chair 1985–1986)
- Deputy member of the Parliamentary Commerce Committee 1979–1982
- Presidential elector 1979–1986
- Member of the Parliamentary Trustees of the Social Insurance Institution of Finland 1980–1984
- Deputy member, Parliamentary Foreign Affairs Committee 1982–1986
- Minister of Social Affairs and Health 1987–1990
- Minister of Nordic Cooperation 1989–1991
- Minister of Justice 1990–1991
- Member and vice chair of the Parliamentary Legal Affairs Committee 1991–1995
- Chairperson of the National Advisory Board on Romani Affairs 1993–1995
- Member of the Parliamentary Grand Committee 1993–1995 (chair 1995)
- Minister of Foreign Affairs 1995–2000
- President of Finland 2000–2012

== Criticism ==
Halonen was criticized for her view that the COVID-19 pandemic was handled better in countries with female leaders.

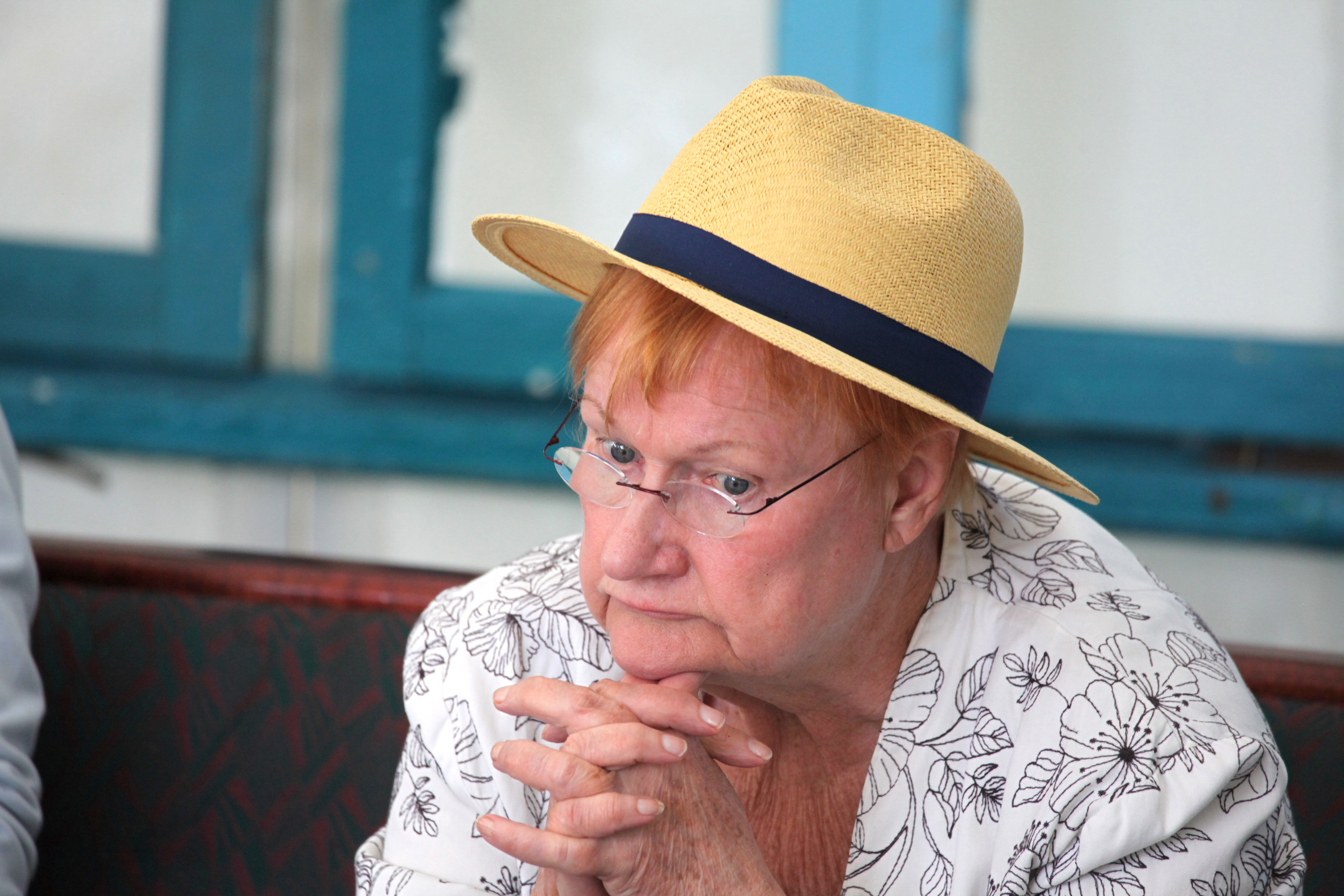
Tarja Halonen at the Opinion Festival 2021 in Paide, Estonia.

Former Estonian president Toomas Hendrik Ilves and Finnish author Sofi Oksanen have strongly criticized Halonen for perceived unwillingness to publicly condemn Russia’s hostilities in the past. Notably, after the 2008 Russian invasion of Georgia, Halonen referred to Ilves' concerns as "post-Soviet stress".

== Honours and awards ==
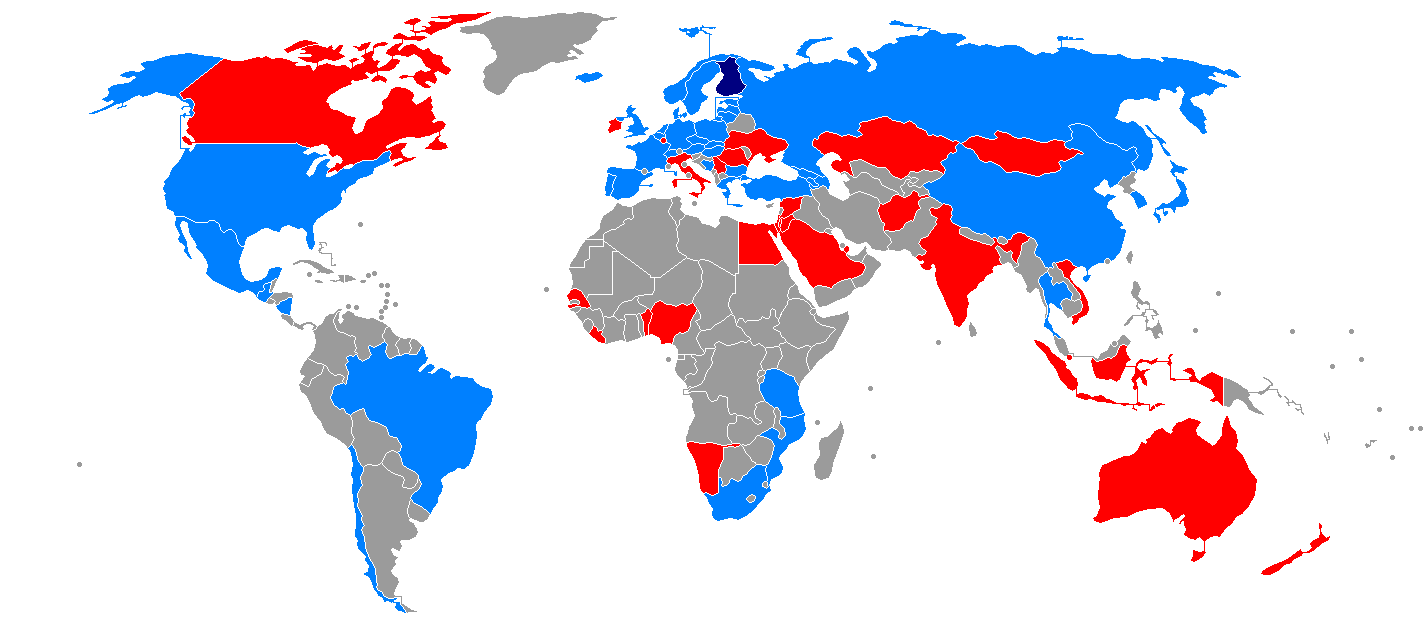
Countries visited by Finland's President Tarja Halonen during her presidency 2000 to 2012. In blue are the 1st term, in red during the 2nd term.

Coat of Arms of Tarja Halonen
- Armiger: Tarja Halonen
- Adopted: 2001
- Motto: "Yhteisen kansan puolesta"("For a united nation")

=== Honours ===
==== National honours ====
- Grand Cross and former Grand Master of the Order of the Cross of Liberty
- Grand Cross with Collar and former Grand Master of the Order of the White Rose
- Grand Cross and former Grand Master of the Order of the Lion

==== Foreign honours ====
- Austria: Grand Star of the Order of Honour for Services to the Republic of Austria
- Belgium: Knight Grand Cordon of the Order of Leopold I
- Brazil: Grand Collar of the Order of the Southern Cross
- Chile: Collar of the Order of Merit
- Croatia: Grand Cross of the Grand Order of King Tomislav (Note: For outstanding contribution to the development of a full, good and friendly between the Republic of Croatia and the Republic of Finland – 7 April 2009.)
- Denmark:
  - Knight of the Order of the Elephant
  - Grand Cross of the Order of Dannebrog
- Estonia:
  - Collar of the Order of the Cross of Terra Mariana
  - Collar of the Order of the White Star
- France: Grand Cross of the Order of the Legion of Honour
- Germany: Grand Cross Special Class of the Order of Merit of the Federal Republic of Germany
- Greece:
  - Grand Cross of the Order of the Redeemer
  - Grand Cross of the Order of Honour
- Iceland: Grand Cross with Collar of the Order of the Falcon
- Italy: Knight Grand Cross with Collar of the Order of Merit of the Italian Republic
- Japan: Grand Cordon with Collar of the Order of the Chrysanthemum
- Kazakhstan: Collar of the Order of the Golden Eagle
- Latvia: Commander Grand Cross with Chain of the Order of the Three Stars
- Liberia: Grand Cross of the Order of the Pioneers of Liberia
- Lithuania: Grand Cross with Chain of the Order of Vytautas the Great
- Luxembourg: Knight of the Order of the Gold Lion of the House of Nassau
- Netherlands: Grand Cross of the Order of the House of Orange
- Norway: Grand Cross with Collar of the Order of St. Olav
- Qatar: Collar of the Order of Merit
- Poland: Grand Cross of the Order of the White Eagle
- Portugal: Collar of the Order of Prince Henry
- Romania: Collar of the Order of the Star of Romania
- Russia: Recipient of the Medal of Pushkin
- Saudi Arabia: First Class of the Order of Abdulaziz al Saud
- Senegal: Grand Cross of the Order of the Lion
- Slovakia: First Class of the Order of the White Double Cross
- Slovenia: Member of the Decoration for Exceptional Merits
- Spain: Dame Grand Cross of the Order of Isabella the Catholic
- Sweden:
  - Member with Collar of the Royal Order of the Seraphim
  - Member Grand Cross of the Royal Order of the Polar Star

=== Awards ===
- Canada: 2014 Fray International Sustainability Award given by FLOGEN Star Outreach

=== Honorary Degrees ===
- University of Helsinki, Faculty of Philosophy, 2010
- Kazan (Volga region) Federal University, 2010
- Theatre Academy Helsinki, 2009
- Umeå University, Sweden, 2009
- University of Minnesota Duluth, 2008
- Helsinki University of Technology, 2008
- Yerevan State University, 2005
- University of Tartu, 2004
- University of Bluefields, 2004
- University of Turku, 2003
- Finlandia University, 2003{
- Chinese Academy of Forestry, 2002
- Eötvös Loránd University, 2002
- University of Kent, 2002
- Ewha Womans University, 2002
- Helsinki School of Economics, 2001
- University of Helsinki, Faculty of Law, 2000

== In popular culture ==
A long-running joke, which stems from the recurring segment "Conan O'Brien Hates My Homeland", is that American talk show host Conan O'Brien resembles Tarja Halonen. After joking about this for several months (which led to his endorsement of her campaign), O'Brien travelled to Finland, appeared on several television shows and met President Halonen. The trip was filmed and aired as a special.

Halonen also appears as an animated character in the political satire TV series The Autocrats.

== See also ==
- List of national leaders
- List of presidents of Finland
- Club of Rome

== Notes ==
Political offices
Preceded by Matti Louekoski	Minister of Justice; 1990–1991	Succeeded by Hannele Pokka
Preceded by Paavo Rantanen	Minister of Foreign Affairs; 1995–2000	Succeeded by Erkki Tuomioja
Preceded by Martti Ahtisaari	President of Finland; 2000–2012	Succeeded by Sauli Niinistö
Diplomatic posts
Preceded by Mary Robinson	Chair of the Council of Women World Leaders; 2009–2014	Succeeded by Dalia Grybauskaitė
Order of precedence
Preceded by Alexander Stubb as President	Order of precedence of Finland; Former President	Succeeded by Sauli Niinistö as former President
