= Raatikainen =

Raatikainen is a Finnish surname. Notable people with the surname include:

- August Raatikainen (1874–1937), Finnish farmer and politician
- Erkki Raatikainen (1930–2011), Finnish journalist and politician
- Jaska Raatikainen (born 1979), Finnish musician
- Jussi Raatikainen (1898–1978), Finnish journalist and politician
- Kaisa Raatikainen (1928–2007), Finnish politician
- Sami Raatikainen, Finnish musician
