= Taxation in Finland =

Taxation in Finland is primarily conducted by the Finnish Tax Administration, an agency of the Ministry of Finance. Finnish Customs, the Finnish Transport and Communications Agency (Traficom), and pension funds also collect taxes. Taxes collected are distributed to the government, municipalities, churches, and the Kela social-insurance institution. Finnish taxes may be divided into four types:

- A progressive state income tax
- Other, primarily flat-rate income taxes
- A flat-rate property tax
- Flat-rate consumption and property transfer taxes

== Income tax ==
Income (Finnish: tulo) is categorized in Finnish tax law as earned income (ansiotulo) or capital income (pääomatulo); earned income is paid for employment and "any income other than capital income". In general, a tax is a compulsory financial charge by a governmental organisation.

=== Earned-income taxes ===
Proportional taxes are deducted from gross income before the net income subject to state income tax is determined. An employee's gross earned income is subject to three proportional social-security contributions:

- A pension insurance fee (työeläkevakuutusmaksu), paid to a pension insurance company
- An unemployment-insurance fee (työttömyysvakuutusmaksu), paid to the state
- A health-insurance daily allowance contribution (sairausvakuutuksen päivärahamaksu), also paid to the state

Net earned income (gross income minus deductions) is subject to:

- An income tax (tulovero), divided into
  - A progressive tax, paid to the state (state income tax)
  - A proportional tax, paid to the municipality (municipal tax)
  - A proportional church tax, paid to the parish (kirkollisvero) if the person is a member
- A proportional health-insurance medical expenses contribution (sairausvakuutuksen sairaanhoitomaksu), paid to the state
- A proportional Yle tax (yleisradiovero), paid to the state to fund Finland's public broadcasting company

There is an earned income tax credit (työtulovähennys) for certain proportional taxes and fees, making them somewhat progressive.

==== Pension insurance fees ====
Everyone from 17 to 68 years old who is an employee pays a pension insurance fee based on gross income. The percentage is set annually by the Ministry of Social Affairs and Health. The employee's fee was 7.15 percent in 2025, and the employer's 2025 average was 17.38 percent.

==== Unemployment-insurance fees ====
Every employee from 18 to 65 years old is required to pay unemployment-insurance fees from their gross work income. The employer's fee is proportional to what they pay to all employees, and is not withheld from employees' gross salaries. The percentages are set by law to enable the Employment Fund (Työllisyysrahasto) to pay unemployment benefits. As of 2025, the employee's fee is 0.59 percent; the employer's fee is 0.20 percent for salaries up to €2,455,500, and 0.80 percent above that.

==== Health-insurance daily allowance contribution ====
Every Finnish employee from 16 to 68 years old and works as an employee in Finland is required to make a health-insurance daily allowance contribution from their gross earned income. The rate is set annually by law at a level which secures funding for healthcare. The 2025 rate was 0.84 percent for gross earned income of (or above) €16,862.

==== State income tax ====
The following are deducted from gross income before determining the net income subject to state income tax:

- An automatic income-production deduction (tulonhankkimisvähennys); €750 in 2025
- Trade union membership fees
- Expenses for production of income (tulonhankkimismenot): All costs above the automatic income-production deduction
- Employee pension insurance fee
- Employee unemployment-insurance fee
- A health-insurance daily allowance contribution
- Automatic basic deduction (perusvähennys); the maximum of €4,115 decreases as gross income rises, down to €0.

The 2025 progressive rates for net income were:

Net income over	Tax rate
€0	12.64%
€21,200	19%
€31,500	30.25%
€52,100	34%
€88,200	41.75%
€150,000	44.25%

Gross state income tax is subject to the following credits:

- A household expenses credit (kotitalousvähennys): all costs above €150 (maximum €1,600) in 2025
- An automatic earned income tax credit: A maximum of €3,225 in 2025, decreasing to €0 as gross income rises

Other credits are subtracted from the gross tax before the earned income tax credit (työtulovähennys) is deducted. If there is any earned income tax credit left after deducting it from the gross state income tax, the remainder is subtracted from the gross municipal tax, gross health insurance medical expenses contribution, and gross church tax.

==== Municipal tax ====
The following contributions are deducted from the gross income before determining the net income subject to the municipal tax:

- natural deductions:
  - automatic income-production deduction; €750 in 2025
  - trade union membership fees
  - expenses for the production of income; all costs above the automatic income-production deduction
- other deductions:
  - employee's pension insurance fee
  - employee's unemployment insurance fee
  - health insurance daily allowance contribution
  - automatic basic deduction; maximum of €4,115 (decreases as gross income rises, down to €0)

The municipal tax is levied on the net income. The municipality sets the rate, and in 2025 it ranges from 4.7% (Kauniainen) to 19.7% (Kökar), with an average of 9.28%. If there is any earned income tax credit left (after deducting it from the state income tax), the remainder is subtracted from the gross municipal tax, proportionally to its share in the sum of the gross municipal tax, gross health insurance medical expenses contribution, and gross church tax.

==== Health-insurance medical expenses contribution ====
The following are deducted from gross income before determining net income subject to the medical-expenses contribution:

- Automatic income-production deduction: €750 in 2025
- Trade union membership fees
- Expenses for production of income; all costs above the automatic income-production deduction
- Employee pension insurance fee
- Employee unemployment insurance fee
- Health-insurance daily allowance contribution
- Automatic basic deduction: A maximum of €4,115, decreasing to €0 as gross income rises

The medical-expenses contribution (1.06 percent in 2025) is levied on net income. If any earned-income tax credits are left after deducting it from the state income tax, the remainder is subtracted from the gross medical expenses contribution proportional to its share of the sum of the gross municipal tax, gross medical-expenses contribution, and gross church tax.

==== Church tax ====
If a person is a member of the Evangelical Lutheran, the Orthodox Church, or any of the country-wide Lutheran parishes (the German parish in Finland and Olaus Petri parish for citizens of Sweden living in Finland), their net earned income is subject to the church tax (kirkollisvero). The following are deducted from gross income to determine net income subject to the church tax:

- automatic income-production deduction; €750 in 2025
- trade union membership fees
- expenses for the production of income; all costs above the automatic income-production deduction
- employee's pension insurance fee
- employee's unemployment insurance fee
- health insurance daily allowance contribution
- automatic basic deduction: maximum of €4,115, decreasing to €0 as gross income rises

If a municipality has multiple parishes, the rate is set for the entire municipality by the parish union (seurakuntayhtymä) representing all the parishes; otherwise, the rate is set by the parish. In 2025, the rate for Evangelical Lutheran parishes ranged from 1.0 to 2.0 percent the rate for Orthodox parishes ranged from 1.75 to 2.25 percent.

==== Yle tax ====
The following deductions are made from gross income to determine net income subject to the Yle tax:

- automatic income-production deduction: €750 in 2025
- trade union membership fees
- expenses for the production of income; all costs above the automatic income-production deduction

The Yle tax (2.5 percent) is levied on net income above €15,150, with a maximum of €160.

==== Collection of taxes on earned income ====
An employer withholds an employee's pension insurance and unemployment insurance fees from each gross paycheck. The employer is responsible for choosing the pension-insurance institution, and pays the fee to the institution. The pension insurance fees withheld by public-sector employers are paid to the Keva agency.

The employer withholds an additional portion of each paycheck and pays it to the Finnish Tax Administration as a withholding tax (ennakonpidätys). It is the total of the following taxes:

- health insurance daily allowance contribution
- state income tax
- municipal tax
- health insurance medical-expenses contribution
- church tax
- Yle tax

The withholding percentage is rounded up to the nearest 0.5 percent.

=== Taxation of non-residents ===
A person who has and stayed in Finland for more than six months is considered a resident for tax purposes. A resident's worldwide income is subject to Finnish tax, with no distinction by source country. Non-residents are subject only to taxation of Finnish-sourced income.

==== ID and tax numbers ====
People working in Finland for a short time can get a Finnish personal ID at the tax office. The Finnish Tax Administration can enter information into the Population Register System and distribute identity codes with Local Register Offices if foreigners arrive in Finland for less than one year to work. The ID requires the following information: full name, date of birth, sex, place of birth, address, citizenship, native language, and occupation.

To address the grey economy in the construction industry, an act governing mandatory tax numbers and the public register of tax numbers was adopted in 2012. Mandatory tax numbers are issued only to construction-industry workers. The individual tax number does not indicate an individual's age, sex or date of birth, and does not change when a person works for another employer or at another construction site.

==== Source tax for foreign employees with special expertise ====
Some foreign employees pay a flat-rate source tax of 32 percent of their net income instead of progressive state income taxes, other taxes, and social-security contributions. The source tax is applied to a foreign employee under the following conditions:

- the individual becomes resident in Finland at the beginning of the period of employment to which the act applies
- the salary for this employment is at least €5,800 per month during the period of employment to which the act applies
- their tasks require special expertise
- they are not a Finnish citizen, and have not been tax-liable in Finland in the five years before the year this employment began

A person is liable for the source tax for a maximum of seven years from the beginning of their employment.

==== European Union officials ====
Salaries or grants paid by European Union bodies, such as the European Chemicals Agency in Helsinki, are tax-free in Finland and do not need to be reported to the Finnish Tax Administration or Finnish social security (regardless of residency). Instead, EU officials pay an EU-wide European tax on their salaries.

=== Taxes on capital income ===
Dividends, rents, and other kinds of capital gains are considered capital income (pääomatulo). Net capital income is taxed at a fixed rate of 30 percent for net income up to €30,000, and 34 percent for net income above that.

==== Dividends from listed companies ====
The proportion of dividends from a listed (publicly traded) company subject to capital income tax depends on whether the share is owned via a book-entry account (arvo-osuustili) or an equity savings account (osakesäästötili). With an equity savings account, one can own only shares of listed companies and the owner can only be a person.

===== Shares owned with a book-entry account =====
Fifteen percent of dividends from listed companies to a private person are tax-exempt if the shares are owned with a book-entry account; the rest is subject to the capital income tax.

===== Shares owned with an equity savings account =====
Dividends from a listed company to a private individual are subject to capital income tax if the shares are held in an equity savings account. The value of the account is the sum of the money in the account and the market price of the shares bought with money deposited in the account. Dividends are deposited into the account, and the owner can buy and sell shares with the assets of the account. If the owner withdraws money from the account when it has surplus value (its value exceeds what has been deposited there), the profit withdrawn is proportional to the withdrawal's proportion of the value of the account and is subject to the capital income tax. No expenses are deductible from capital income when the account is active; losses are deductible only when the account is closed with losses and the money is withdrawn.

==== Dividends from unlisted companies ====
If the dividend from an unlisted company paid to an individual is eight percent or less of the net assets of the company, 75 percent of the dividend is tax-exempt. The rest is subject to the capital income tax (30 or 34 percent), yielding a minimum effective capital-income tax rate of 7.5 percent. If the dividend is more than eight percent of a company's net assets, 75 percent of the dividend (up to the eight-percent threshold) is tax-exempt and the rest of the dividend (up to the threshold) is subject to the capital-income tax (30% or 34%); 25 percent of the dividend above the eight-percent threshold is tax-exempt. The rest of the dividend above the threshold is considered earned income, and added to the net earned income from any other sources; the sum is subject to the progressive state income tax rate. If a person's dividends from unlisted companies are over €150,000, 85 percent of the sum above €150,000 is subject to the capital income tax; the rest is tax-exempt.

=== Taxes on corporate income ===
The corporate income tax rate is 20 percent. Corporate tax was lowered from 24.5 to 20 percent in January 2014. A small percentage of corporate taxes was distributed to parishes until 2016, regardless of corporate religious affiliation. In 2016, direct tax distribution was replaced with a fixed annual state subsidy (€105 million in 2025) which follows the Finnish Consumer Price Index.

== Other taxes ==
=== Property tax ===
Municipalities collect property tax (kiinteistövero). The tax is levied separately on land (maapohja) and buildings. The property owner pays the tax on the land, and the building owner pays the tax on the buildings. The tax on land is generally 1.30 to two percent, but a municipality can set it from two to six percent if the property is undeveloped and certain legal requirements are met. If the property is in Espoo, Helsinki, Hyvinkää, Järvenpää, Kauniainen, Kerava, Kirkkonummi, Mäntsälä, Nurmijärvi, Pornainen, Sipoo, Tuusula, Vantaa, or Vihti, the Property Tax Act mandates a land tax for undeveloped property which is three percent higher than for developed property, with a maximum of six percent. The tax on buildings is 0.41 to one percent for permanently-residential buildings and 0.93 to two percent for buildings with at least 50 percent of their space reserved for non-permanent residence.

=== Property-transfer tax ===
There is a three-percent property-transfer tax (varainsiirtovero) for property, and 1.5 percent for stock and housing-cooperative shares. First-time homebuyers were exempt from the transfer tax until 31 December 2023.

=== Consumption taxes ===
Value-added tax (arvonlisävero) is levied at a standard rate of 25.5 percent (on 1 September 2025), and at two reduced rates: 14 percent on food, restaurant and catering services and animal feed, and 10 percent on books, pharmaceutical products, services creating opportunities for physical exercise, passenger transportation and accommodation.

Excise taxes (valmistevero) were levied for alcohol, tobacco, sweets, lotteries, insurance, transport fuels, and automobiles in 2011. The motor-vehicle tax is substantial, and permanent residents generally cannot drive foreign-registered cars. Permanent residents outside Finland may drive a foreign-registered car in Finland for six months, or up to 18 months if residence abroad is proven to Finnish customs. Pharmacies pay only the excise tax on their yearly income, and there is a tax credit for pharmacies with subsidiary pharmacies (sivuapteekki); this policy supports pharmacies in sparsely-populated regions.

== Transparency ==
The amount of tax paid by each person and company is public information.

== Pension-fund investment ==
In 2014, Finnwatch estimated that 60 to 70 percent (€37 billion) of Finnish pension funds were invested in tax havens. Political parties have differing agendas about tax havens.

== See also ==
- Economy of Finland
