= Yle Uutiset =

- Logo since 2024
- Genre: News programme
- Presented by: Main anchors: Jussi-Pekka Rantanen; Piia Pasanen; Milla Madetoja
- Country of origin: Finland
- Original language: Finnish

Production
- Producer: Yle
- Production location: Helsinki
- Camera setup: Multi-camera
- Running time: 30 minutes

Original release
- Network: Yle TV1 and Yle TV2
- Release: 1958 – present

Yle Uutiset is the Finnish news production unit of Yle. Yle Uutiset also produces news in Northern Sámi, Russian, Ukrainian and English. News in the other official language of Finland, Swedish, is produced by Svenska Yle.

On TV, news is broadcast daily on Yle TV1 at 11:00, 17:00, 18:00, 20:30 and 21:45 EET. The main broadcast, at 20:30 on Yle TV1, is known as Yle Uutiset klo 20:30. It usually receives about 700,000 to 900,000 viewers. Viewership almost always reaches over 1,000,000 if something remarkable has happened.

Yle Uutiset modernized its look in February 2013 and made a facelift in 2019. The modernization included new studios as well as new intros.

Yle Uutiset modernized its look in June 2024. The new modernization includes new studios as well as new intros.

== News anchors ==
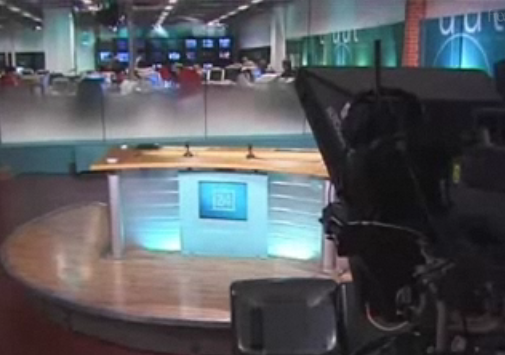
Old Studio of Yle (1999-2007)

=== Main anchors ===
- Jussi-Pekka Rantanen
- Piia Pasanen
- Milla Madetoja

=== Other anchors ===
- Tommy Fränti
- Marjukka Havumäki
- Marjo Rein
- Tuulia Thynell
- Hanna Visala

== Logos ==
Yle Uutiset ninth and previous logo used from 2012 to 2024
