= Hermanni =

Hermanni is the Finnish form of Herman.

It may also refer to:

- nickname of Herman Hermanni Pihlajamäki (1903–1982), Finnish Olympic champion wrestler
- Hermanni Vuorinen (born 1985), Finnish former footballer
- the title clown character of Pelle Hermanni, a Finnish children's television show (1978–1988)
- Hermanni (Helsinki), a neighborhood of Helsinki, Finland
