= Veijo Pasanen =

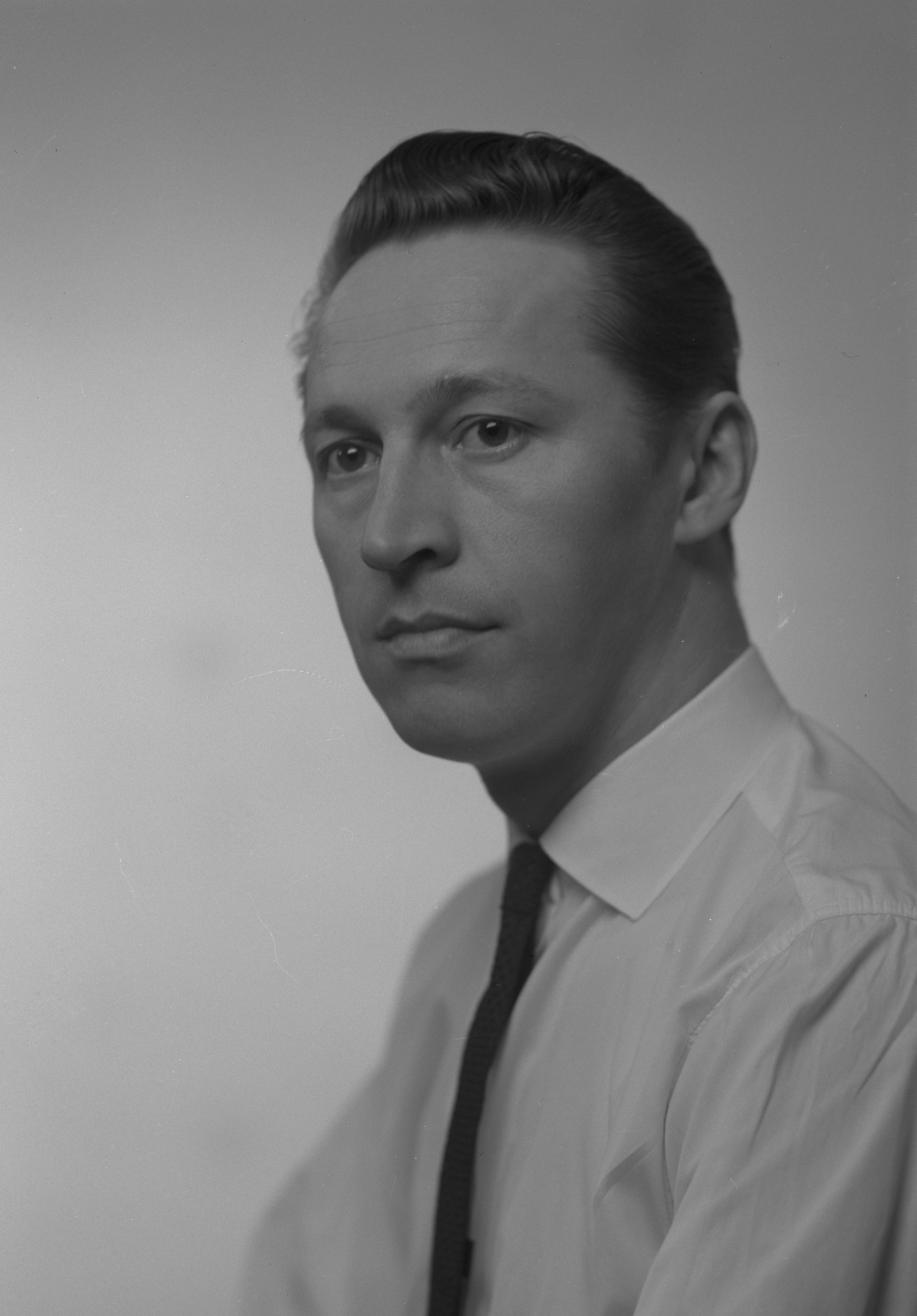
- Born: 14 October 1930; Muuruvesi, Finland
- Died: 17 February 1988 (aged 57); Tampere, Finland

Veijo Antero Pasanen (14 October 1930 – 17 February 1988) was a Finnish actor. He was related to director and inventor Pertti "Spede" Pasanen.

Pasanen is perhaps best remembered for his role as Pelle Hermanni (Herman the Clown) in the children's TV series Pikku Kakkonen. In 1988, Pelle Hermanni's "äitiliini" ("dear old mother") Raili Veivo continued the series, but died a few years after Pasanen. In 1992, a new series starring Tommi Auvinen as clown-in-training Niko was started as a successor of Pelle Hermanni, but the series was discontinued after ten episodes.

Pasanen was a good friend of children and is said to have practiced children's plays more intensively than adult drama. He was a distant cousin of Pertti "Spede" Pasanen.

He has one child with his wife Marjatta Lilja.

== Filmography ==
- Mitäs me taiteilijat (1952)
- Me tulemme taas (1953)
- Olemme kaikki syyllisiä (1954)
- The Unknown Soldier (1955)
- Murheenkryynin poika (1958)
- Sven Tuuva (1958)
- Päämaja (1970)
- Aatamin puvussa... ja vähän Eevankin (1971)
- Siunattu hulluuss (1975)
- Hullu kesä (1981)
- Kuningas jolla ei ollut sydäntä (1982)
- Arvottomat (1982)
- Akaton mies (1983)
- Klaani - tarina Sammakoitten suvusta (1984)
