= Camilla Mickwitz =

Finnish children's writer (1937–1989)

- Born: 22 September 1937
- Died: 4 July 1989 (aged 51); Lohja

Camilla Mickwitz (22 September 1937 – 4 July 1989) was a Finland-Swedish writer, illustrator, and animator. Mickwitz wrote children's literature, usually addressing family and social issues.

== Biography ==
In 1959, Mickwitz graduated from the Institute of Industrial Arts in Helsinki. Afterwards, she worked as an advertiser for the Suomen Ilmoituskeskus (Finnish Information Centre) and Otavamedia. Mickwitz belonged to the Swedish-speaking minority.

== Works ==
Over Mickwitz's career, she created a total of twenty picture books and the same number of animations.

One of Mickwitz's first popular series was Jason — based upon the title character and his single mother. Four animations were made between 1972 and 1974. The first short, titled Jason, was released in 1972. Two were released in 1973, Jason ja Frans ('Jason and Frans'), and Jasonin kesä ('Jason's Summer'). The final one in 1974 was Jason ja vihainen Viivi ('Jason and angry Viivi'). The animated series was then adapted into a children's book series. The first one was published in 1975 as Jason: Tarina tavallisesta pienestä pojasta which translates to 'Jason: A story about a typical little boy'. The subsequent book, based on Jasonin kesä or 'Jason's Summer', was published in 1976 and was re-released by the publishing company Eesti Raamat in 1984. The third in the series was titled Jason ja vihainen Viivi and was published the following year in 1977. The final book, titled Jason muuttaa maasta, was published in 1978.

A year after Jason, Mickwitz created another series, titled after the protagonist, Emilia. The first book, titled Emilia ja kolme pikkuista tätiä which translates to 'Emilia and three little aunts', was released in 1979. In 1980, three books were released, each titled Emilia ja kuningas Oskari ('Emilia and King Oscar'), Emilia ja Oskarin nukke ('Emilia and Oscar's Doll'), and Emilia ja onni ('Emilia and luck'). The final book was released in 1981 as Emilia ja kaksoset ('Emilia and Twins').

In 1983, Mickwitz wrote Mimosa, a book that would later be adapted into an animated short the same year, starring Lilli Sukula-Lindblom and Eero Saarinen. Mickwitz wrote and animated the short.

Also In 1983, Mickwitz animated the intro and designed the logo for Finnish TV show Pikku Kakkonen.

== Awards ==
For her work in children's literature, Mickwitz won the Finnish State Prize for Cinema in 1973, and 1979, the Finnish State Prize for Literature in 1973, 1976, and 1986, and the Finnish Children's Culture Prize (Lastenkulttuurin valtionpalkinto) in 1987. She is also a four-time winner of the Rudolf Koivu prize, winning in 1977, 1979, 1981, and 1984.

The Jason series won several awards. Both the animation and the book Jasonin kesä won the prize for the best children's animation at the Hollywood Festival of World Television in 1975, and the IBBY Honour award for illustration in 1978. Jason muuttaa maasta won the Arvid Lydecken Prize in 1979.
