= Aksel Airo =

Finnish general (1898–1985)

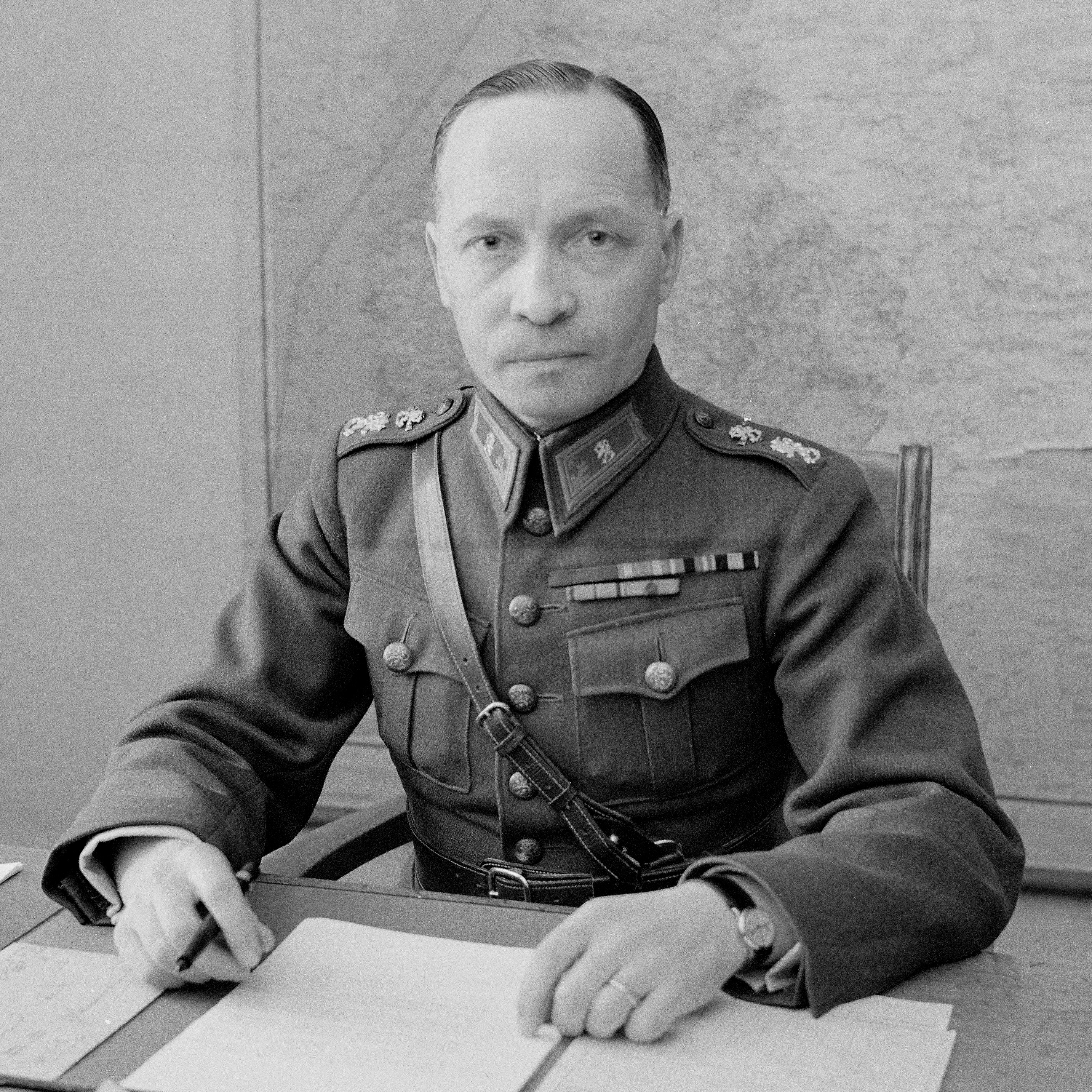
- Aksel Airo in 1940
- Born: Aksel Fredrik Johansson; 14 February 1898; Turku, Grand Duchy of Finland, Russian Empire
- Died: 9 May 1985 (aged 87); Heinola, Finland
- Military career
- Allegiance: Finland
- Branch: Army
- Service years: 1918–1945
- Rank: Lieutenant general
- Awards: Knight of the Mannerheim Cross in Order of the Cross of Liberty, Order of the White Rose

Aksel Fredrik Airo (14 February 1898 – 9 May 1985) was a Finnish lieutenant general and main strategic planner during the Winter War and the Continuation War. He was the virtual second-in-command of the Finnish army under Field Marshal C.G.E. Mannerheim.

He was born in Turku. As a young man he became a supporter of Finnish independence. His father changed the original, Swedish, family name Johansson to Airo (lit. "oar").

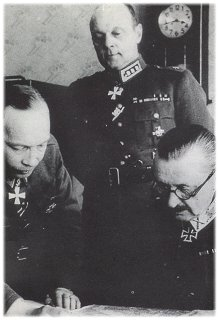
Aksel Airo (left), with C.G.E. Mannerheim (right) and Erik Heinrichs

During the Civil War in Finland (1918), Airo served in the artillery on the White side, taking part in battles near Viipuri. At the end of the war he was a lieutenant. Afterwards he was trained as an officer in Lappeenranta artillery school and was sponsored to the French military academy, École militaire in St.-Cyr in 1920. In 1921 he was accepted into École Supérieure de Guerre, the French officer training academy, from which he graduated as a captain in 1923, at the age of 27. Mannerheim invited him to join Finland's Defense Council as a secretary.

Airo rose swiftly in rank, mainly because newly independent Finland needed suitable officers for the fledgling army. He had, however, some professional challenges because he was neither a Germany-trained Jaeger officer, nor one of the officers trained in the Tsar's army during Russian rule. Still, by 1930 he had become a colonel.

In the beginning of the Winter War, Mannerheim appointed Airo as Quartermaster-General, and he was promoted to major general, and two years later to lieutenant general. On November 18, 1944, Marshal Mannerheim made him a Knight of the Mannerheim Cross in Order of the Cross of Liberty.

Airo was in the Mikkeli headquarters during the war and rarely went to the field. He was responsible for operational planning and the presentation of operations, or, as he allegedly said, "The Marshal leads the war, but I lead the battles". They had many differences in opinion but still managed to work well together.

After the Continuation War, the now Communist-dominated Valpo (the Finnish State Police) arrested him for his alleged involvement in the so-called Weapons Cache Case. He was imprisoned for nearly three years, 1945 to 1948 without being sentenced, until president Juho Kusti Paasikivi released him. He said almost nothing about the affair afterwards and earned the moniker "the silent general". The President relieved him of his duties with special permission to wear a military uniform.

In his later life Airo was a member of the parliament for the National Coalition Party and a presidential elector. Unlike many of his contemporaries, he never wrote memoirs about his war experiences. In 1982 President Mauno Koivisto awarded Airo with the Grand Cross of the Finnish Order of the White Rose with swords, which was a very rare honour in Finland. He died in 1985 at his home farm in Heinola.

== See also ==
- The Headquarters (film)
