= Jarmo Rantanen =

Finnish politician

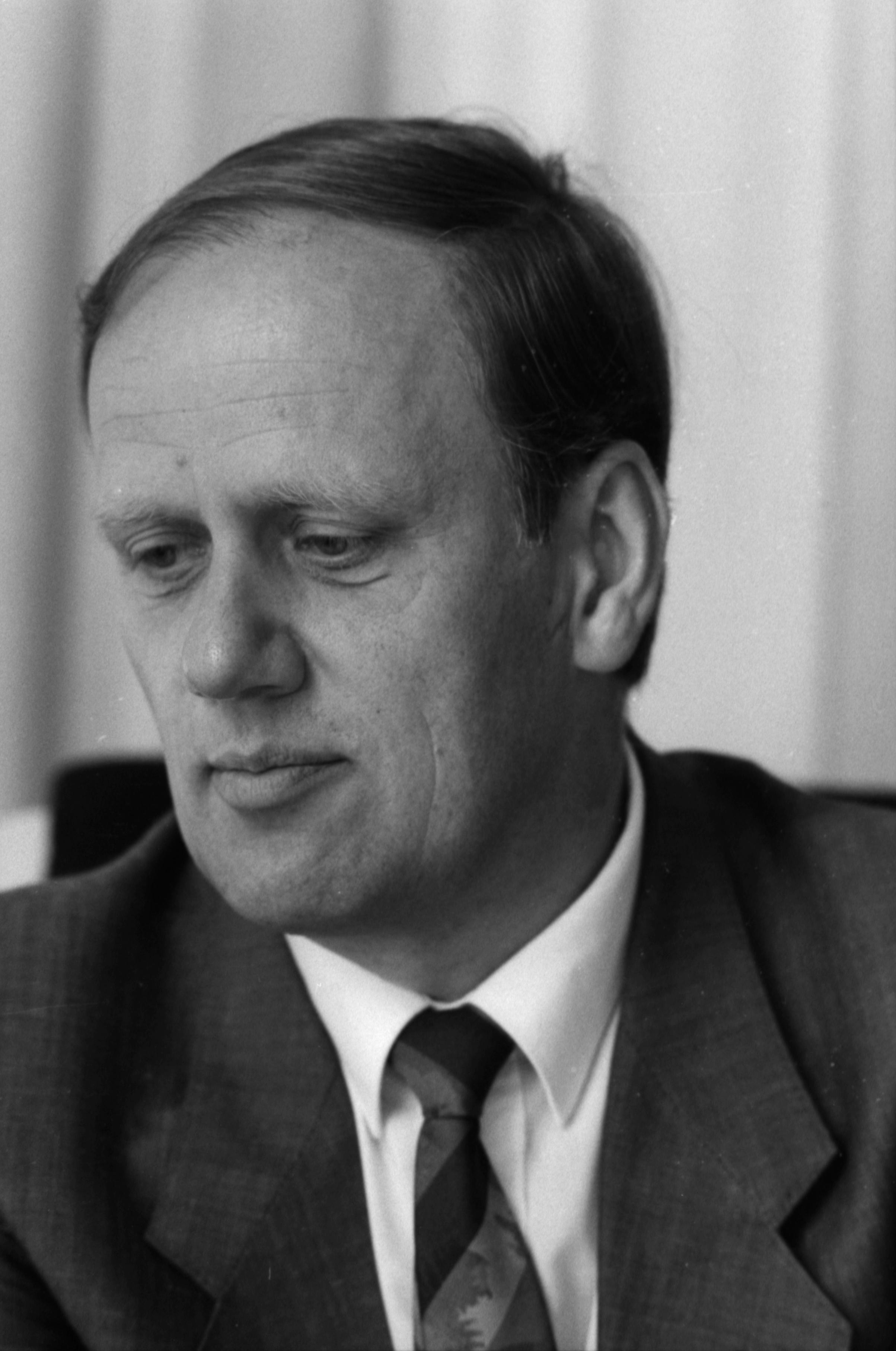
Rantanen in 1986

Jarmo Heikki Kullervo Rantanen (born on 20 June 1944, in Orivesi) is a Finnish politician from the Social Democratic Party.

He was elected as the city manager of Tampere in 1985 and served until he retired in the end of 2006. Additionally, he served as the Minister of the Interior in the Holkeri Cabinet from 1987 to 1991.

Political offices
Preceded by Kaisa Raatikainen	Minister of the Interior (Finland); 1987–1991	Succeeded by Mauri Pekkarinen
