= Lauri Kivinen =

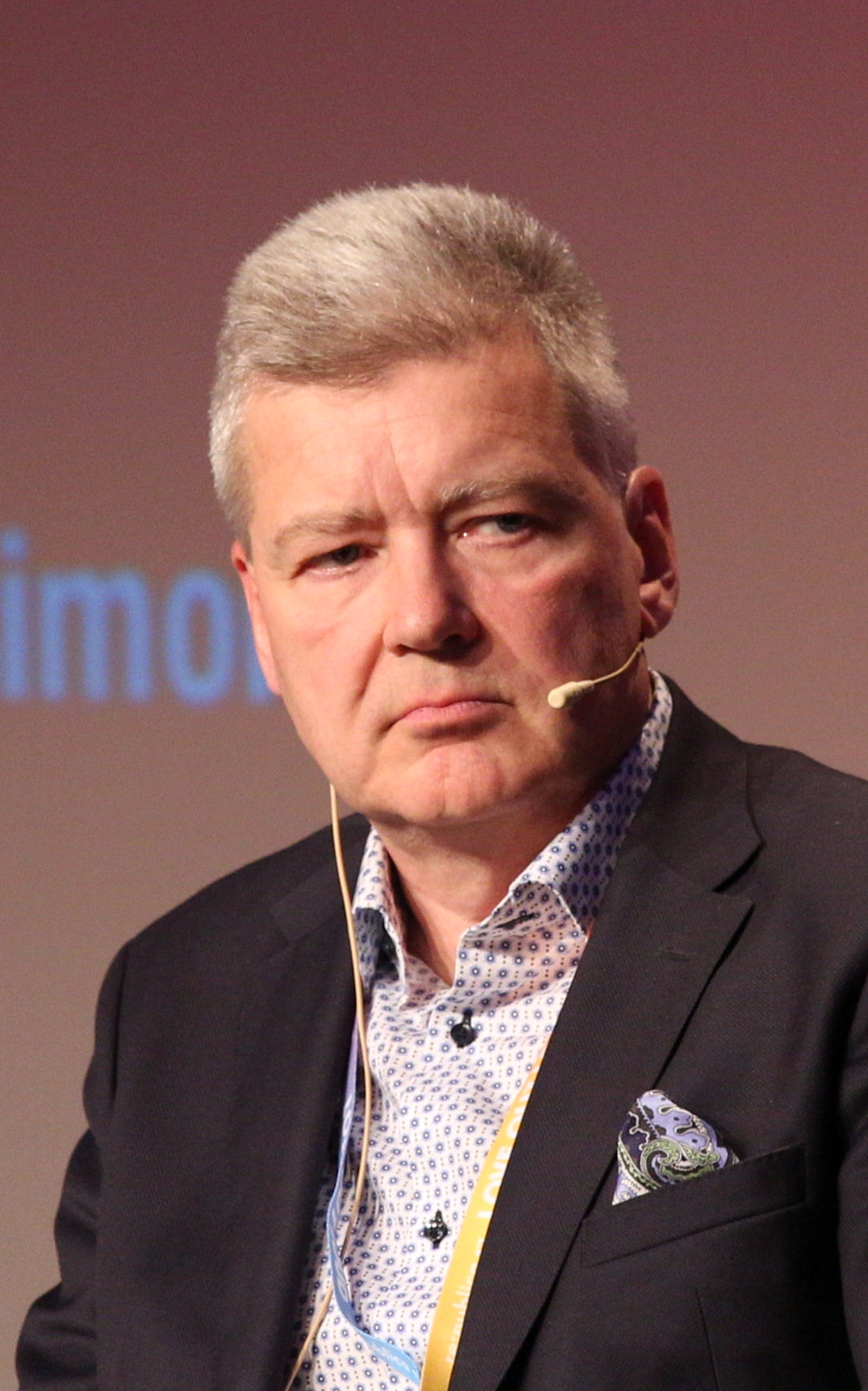
Kivinen in 2017

Lauri Simo Kivinen (born 2 April 1961, Vaasa) is the former CEO of the Finnish Broadcasting Company. He had previously held management positions at Nokia and at Nokia Siemens Networks. Kivinen first became a manager within the telecommunications industry in 1988.

== Biography ==
Lauri Simo Kivinen was born on 2 April 1961 in Vaasa, Ostrobothnia, Finland. Little else is known about Kivinen's early life.

Kivinen obtained a Master's degree in Economics after studies at the Turku School of Economics in Turku, Finland, and in St. Gallen, Switzerland.

== Career ==
Kivinen has held various senior roles at both Nokia and at Nokia Siemens Networks.

=== List of positions held ===
- Communications Manager for Nokia Group in Helsinki ~ 1988
- Communications Manager for Nokia Consumer Electronics in Geneva ~ 1989
- Vice-President of Communications at Nokia Mobile Phones ~ 1992
- Head of Nokia's Brussels representative office ~ 2004-2007
- Board member of the European Digital Technology Industry Association ~ 2007-2008
