= Juha Vuorinen =

Finnish writer and journalist

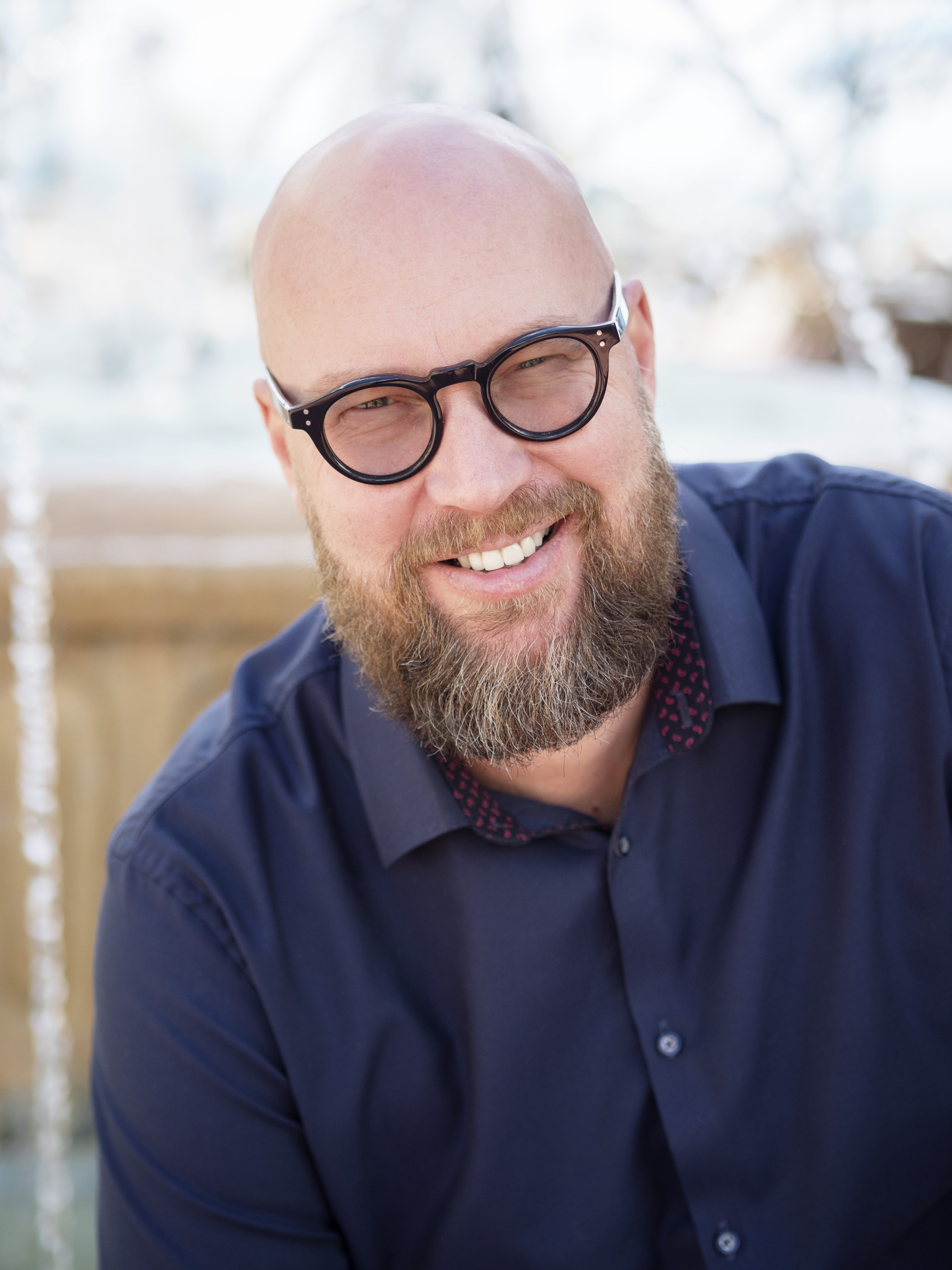
- Juha Vuorinen in 2018
- Born: 31 March 1967 (age 59)
- Occupations: Writer, columnist, publisher, producer, radio personality
- Writing career
- Period: 1998–
- Genres: Humor, Satire
- Notable work: Totally Smashed! (Juoppohullun päiväkirja) (2001)
- Website: diktaattori.fi

Juha Tapio Vuorinen (born 31 March 1967) is a Finnish writer, columnist and radio personality. He is best known for his five-volume book series The Hangover Diaries, particularly the first volume Totally Smashed! (in Finnish Juoppohullun päiväkirja). Since 1983, Vuorinen had been working as a reporter for radio and television, a director, a screenwriter and a producer.

== Career ==
=== Radio ===
At the age of 16, Vuorinen had his first radio show for the show Ocsid. At the beginning of 2013, Vuorinen returned to the Aamulypsy show for Radio Suomipop. He also had the radio columns "Vuorissaarna" ("Vuorinen's Preaching") ja "Annos Andalusiasta" ("A Bit from Andalusia") for the same channel. Vuorinen became a panelist on the show Hyvät ja huonot uutiset on Nelonen in 2017.

=== Writing ===
==== Books ====
In spring of 1998, Vuorinen was asked to write a comedy piece for the keskus.net portal. He had just done a radio show about Tarno Manni whose play Mielipuolen päiväkirja ("Diary of a Maniac") gave him the idea for Juoppohullun päiväkirja (lit. "diary of a dipsomaniac"). At first, Vuorinen had a blog, but it was eventually made into a book at the request of his readers.

After the first printer refused to print "this kind of shit", Vuorinen started his own self-publishing at a copy shop in Kerava. In 2002, the publisher Like was interested in the book and released it as a paperback, releasing 36,000 copies until Vuorinen bought back the rights for his own publishing company Diktaattori. By the end of 2013, 200,000 copies of Totally Smashed! had been sold.

Totally Smashed! has been sold in Germany, Austria and Switzerland (as Göttlich versumpft: Aus dem Tagebuch eines Saufkopfs), Norway (as En finsk fyllefants dagbok), Sweden (as Dilledagboken) and Estonia (as Joomahullu päevaraamat). Vuorinen currently has nine of his books published in Estonian. The fourth volume of The Hangover Diaries, Vaippaihottuma (Diaper Rash!), became the most sold book in Estonia when it was released and is Vuorinen's fourth novel to be on Estonia's the top ten list. The book was translated into English in 2017.

Vuorinen's books have virtually always been at the top of the paperback lists, outselling the 200,000 copy limit for receiving a Kultapokkari ("Golden Paperback") award. Vuorinen sells his books through Diktaattori Oy. In all, he has sold over 2 million books in Finland.

Totally Smashed! was made into a film which premiered on 28 December 2012. It premiered in Estonia in January 2013.

Once a year since 2009 Vuorinen has been releasing a charity paperback, with the proceeds going to, for example, homeless and women's shelters.

==== Columns ====
In May 2008, Vuorinen began writing columns for Metro Live online. In January 2011, he took his columns to Iltalehti. He began writing columns for Apu in April 2016.

== Personal life ==
Vuorinen lives in Spain and Finland with his wife. Vuorinen has four children.
