= Finnish Tax Administration =

Revenue service of Finland

- Finnish: Verohallinto, Swedish: Skatteförvaltningen

Agency overview
- Jurisdiction: Finland
- Headquarters: Vallila, Helsinki
- Employees: 4,983
- Annual budget: 408 million euros
- Agency executive: Markku Heikura
- Parent agency: Ministry of Finance
- Website: www.vero.fi

The Finnish Tax Administration (Finnish: Verohallinto, Swedish: Skatteförvaltningen) is the revenue service of Finland. It is a government agency steered by the Ministry of Finance. The Finnish Tax Administration had 4,983 employees in 2016. It collects around two-thirds of the taxes in the country, with the rest being collected by the Finnish Customs and the Finnish Transport and Communications Agency Traficom. It collects around 55 billion euros and operates with a 408 million euro budget.

== See also ==
- Taxation in Finland
