= Erkki Raatikainen =

Finnish journalist and politician (1930–2011)

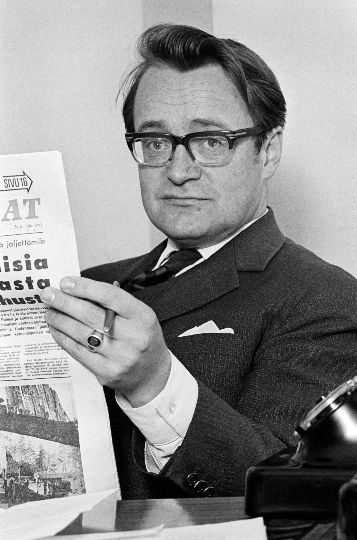

Head of Yle
- In office 1970–1979
- Preceded by: Eino S. Repo
- Succeeded by: Sakari Kiuru

Secretary of Social Democratic Party
- In office 1966–1969
- Succeeded by: Kalevi Sorsa

Personal details
- Born: 24 May 1930 Jyväskylä
- Died: 30 January 2011 (aged 80) Helsinki
- Party: Social Democratic Party
- Spouse: Kaisa Raatikainen
- Children: 4
- Occupation: Journalist

Erkki Raatikainen (1930–2011) was a Finnish journalist and politician. He served as the secretary of Social Democratic Party (SDP) between 1966 and 1969.

== Early life and education ==
Raatikainen was born in Jyväskylä on 24 May 1930. His father was Jussi Raatikainen, a SDP member.

== Career ==
Raatikainen was a journalist for Sosialidemokraati and then worked at the Finnish-language department of BBC in London. He joined Yle in 1958. He served as editor-in-chief of Suomen Sosialidemokraatin for a short period in the 1960s, and he returned to his job at Yle. He was a member of the SDP and part of the leftist faction. He published several editorials in the SDP publication Sosialistinen aikakauslehti. In November 1966 he was elected as the secretary of SDP and held post for three years. He was replaced by Kalevi Sorsa in the post.

Raatikainen was appointed head of the Finnish public broadcaster Yle in 1970 replacing Eino S. Repo in the post. He attempted to improve the status of Yle which had been in crisis. During his term at Yle the company began to cover the American productions, and its daily broadcasts were extended. Yle was subject to censorship particularly about the reports on the Soviet Union. In one of such cases Raatikainen had to apologise for the Yle reporters’ work due to a letter from the Finnish President in 1971. He remained in office until 1979 when Sakari Kiuru was named as the head of Yle. Then Raatikainen began to work as a freelance journalist and published books. One of the publications Raatikainen contributed to was Apu magazine.

=== Views ===
During his term as secretary of the SDP Raatikainen adopted the idea of societal rationalization borrowed from the Swedish social democrats which was about extensive economic planning going beyond the individual industrial sectors. He argued that this approach was needed to improve the state-owned business and the control of capital flows.

== Personal life and death ==
Raatikainen was married to Kaisa Raatikainen (1928–2007) who served as minister of interior and a parliament member for SDP. They had four children.

Raatikainen died in Helsinki on 30 January 2011.
