= Eino S. Repo =

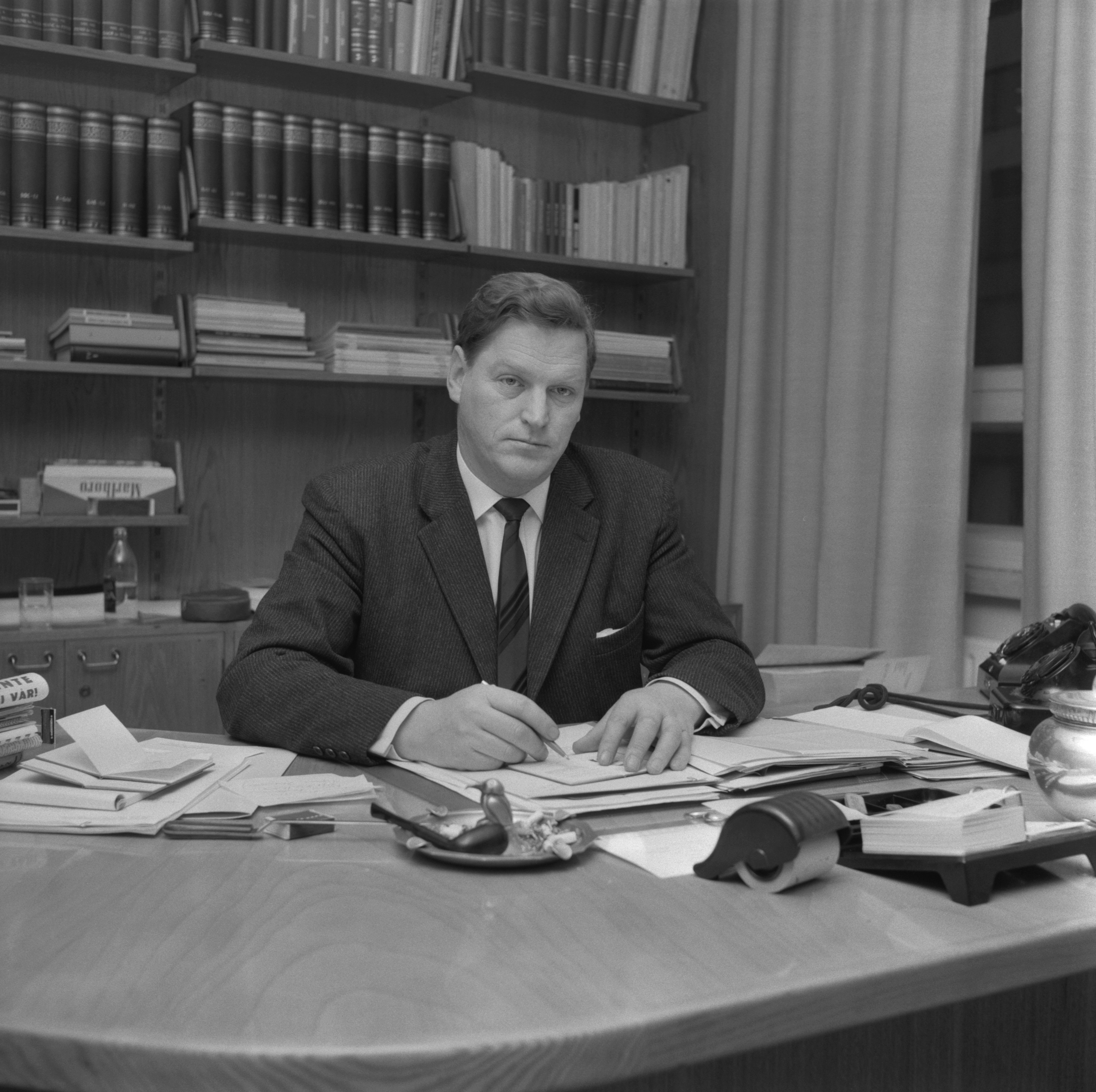
Eino S. Repo in 1965

Eino Sakari Repo (September 6, 1919, Isokyrö – December 15, 2002, Helsinki) was the president of the state-owned Finnish Broadcasting Company from 1965 to 1969 and head of the radio from 1969 to 1974. His time as president was known as Repo's Radio.

Eino S. Repo took part in the Winter and Continuation War, and left the field in 1944 as captain. In 1948 he graduated as a Candidate of Philosophy from the University of Helsinki; his main subject was literature.

Repo was a free literary critic and wrote criticisms to the Uusi Suomi newspaper and Parnasso magazine. Repo was known as a radical, and soon Uusi Suomi didn't like his writing anymore, and also he didn't have a very good relationship with the main critic Veikko Antero Koskenniemi.

From 1958 to 1964 Repo was a reporter for Apu magazine, and then became a program manager at MTV3. When Finnish Broadcasting Company's president Einar Sundström retired in 1965, Repo became his successor as candidate of Agrarian Party. One of his supporters in Finnish Broadcasting Company was Urho Kekkonen, then the president of Finland.

During the Repo presidency, big reforms were made at Finnish Broadcasting Company. During the Repo era left-wing student extremism was growing also in Finnish Broadcasting Company.

Repo gave support to left-wing students and to their critical social programs, these offers started the so-called Repo's Radio. Many critics wrote that Finnish Broadcasting Company during Repo presidency wasn't so much radio as it was a political institute. Finnish Broadcasting Company was blamed for supporting the lefts' victory in the parliament elections in 1966. Repo was not elected to a second five-year term to Finnish Broadcasting Company, but he was made head of the radio. He retired in 1974.

During the Zavidovo scandal, Kekkonen's advisor Antero Jyränki told in his questioning that he gave the place of documents which were the part of the Zavidovo notepad, to Repo. Jyränki was forced to resign after the incident and he was sentenced.
