= Marit af Björkesten =

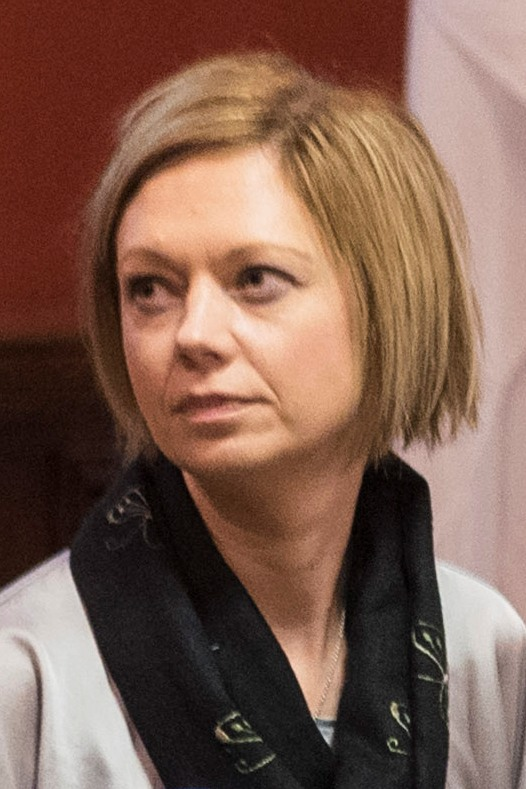
- Björkesten in 2016
- Born: Marit Valentina Pennanen; 15 August 1970 (age 55); Helsinki, Finland
- Education: Master of Political Sciences
- Alma mater: University of Helsinki
- Occupations: News presenter; journalist
- Known for: Chief executive officer of Yle

Marit Valentina af Björkesten (born 15 August 1970) is a Finnish journalist and director. She has been the CEO of Yle since 1 October 2025.

Af Björkesten's career at Hufvudstadsbladet began in 1997. She worked as a news reporter, feature editor and sports editor for the newspaper from 1997 to 2002. She was a news producer from 2002 to 2003, head of the cultural department and cultural producer from 2003 to 2009, and deputy editor-in-chief and head of the editorial department from 2009 to 2012. She has also taught journalism at the Open University of the University of Helsinki from 1996 to 1998.
