= Kaisa Raatikainen =

Finnish politician (1928–2007)

Kaisa Raatikainen (born 10 September 1928, Viitasaari, died 26 February 2007, Espoo) was a Finnish politician from the Social Democratic Party.

She was member of the parliament from 1970 to 1987, and she served as the Minister of the Interior in the Sorsa cabinet from 1 December 1984 to 30 April 1987.

In municipality level, she was a member of Espoo city council from 1969 to 1992. Her husband was the former managing director of Yleisradio, Erkki Raatikainen.

Political offices
Preceded by Matti Luttinen	Minister of the Interior (Finland); 1984–1987	Succeeded by Jarmo Rantanen
