= The Headquarters (film) =

- Original Finnish film poster
- Finnish: Päämaja
- Directed by: Matti Kassila
- Written by: Matti Kassila; Risto Juhani
- Based on: Päämajassa by Ilmari Turja
- Produced by: Risto Orko; Pentti Helanne
- Starring: Joel Rinne; Jussi Jurkka; Tamara Lund
- Cinematography: Esko Nevalainen
- Edited by: Pentti Ojala
- Music by: Jaakko Salo
- Production companies: Filmi-Jatta; Suomi-Filmi
- Release date: 6 November 1970
- Running time: 88 min
- Country: Finland
- Language: Finnish
- Budget: FIM 442,500

The Headquarters (Finnish: Päämaja) is a 1970 Finnish historical war drama film written and directed by Matti Kassila. Based on the 1966 Finnish play Päämajassa by Ilmari Turja, the film describes the mood and atmosphere of the Finnish army headquarters led by Marshal C. G. E. Mannerheim in Mikkeli in the summer of 1944 during the breakthrough of the Karelian Isthmus.

Marshal Mannerheim is played by Joel Rinne in his last film role. Differences of opinion regarding the role of Mannerheim caused dispute between Kassila and Rinne during the filming and led to polemics in the press after the premiere. The film's second main character, lieutenant general A. F. Airo, is played by Jussi Jurkka, who won the Jussi Award for Best Actor for his performance.

== Plot ==
In the summer of 1944, in the Mikkeli headquarters of the Finnish Defence Forces, in the moments of the resolution of the Continuation War, General Airo gives the attack order without asking the commander-in-chief, Marshal Mannerheim, as the major attack on the Karelian Isthmus approaches. When the war turns into defeat, dissension in the staff is caused not only by nervous pressure, but also by an anonymously published newspaper article inciting a defeatist mentality and a list of ministers drawn up by the Germans in case of Finland's withdrawal from the war.

== Cast ==
- Joel Rinne as Marshal C. G. E. Mannerheim
- Jussi Jurkka as General A. F. Airo
- Tamara Lund as Mrs. Markovilla
- Kapo Manto as Colonel J. K. Markovilla
- Matti Pihlaja as reserve lieutenant and editor-in-chief
- Martti Pennanen as chief of general staff
- Jarmo Alonen as Captain Hinder
- Leif Wager as colonel and military attaché of Stockholm
- Nisse Rainne as colonel in the operation unit
- Bjarne Commondt as Lieutenant Colonel Paul Hinder
- Veijo Pasanen as an undisciplined soldier

== See also ==
- List of Finnish films of the 1970s
- Continuation War
- Carl Gustaf Emil Mannerheim
