= Ilmari Turja =

Finnish journalist and playwright

Professori Ilmari Turja
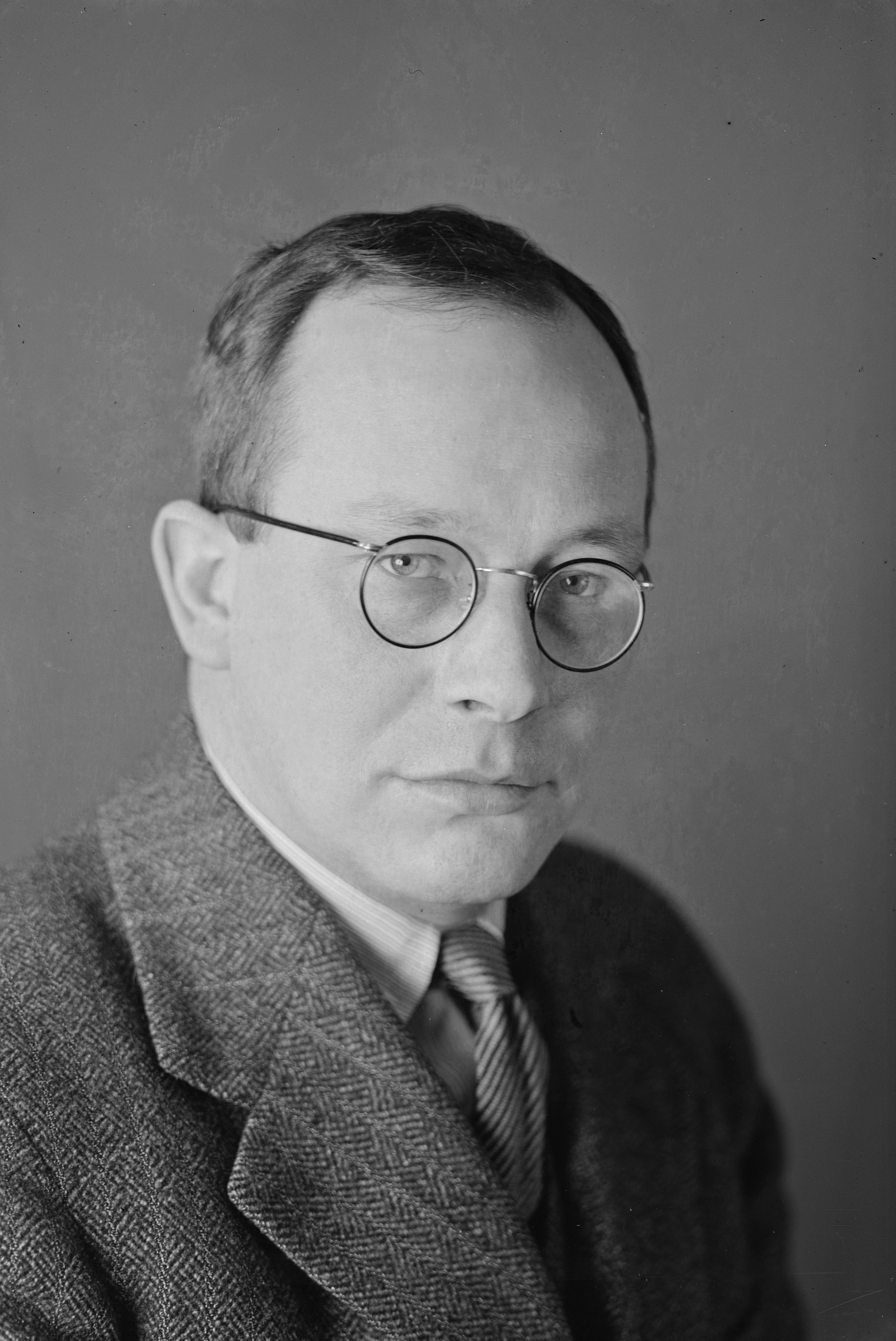
- Ilmari Turja in 1938
- Born: Kaarlo Ilmari Turja; 28 October 1901; Isokyrö, Grand Duchy of Finland
- Died: 6 January 1998 (aged 96); Helsinki, Finland
- Resting place: Kulosaari Cemetery, Helsinki
- Education: Master of Laws
- Alma mater: University of Helsinki
- Occupations: Journalist; Dramatist; Lawyer
- Writing career
- Language: Finnish

Ilmari Turja (28 October 1901 – 6 January 1998) was a Finnish writer, best known as a journalist and playwright, with a career spanning nearly eight decades from the 1920s to the 1990s.

== Early life and education ==
Kaarlo Ilmari Turja was born to a farming family in Isokyrö in western central Finland, to Jaakko and Evelina Turja. However, when he was four, the Turja family moved to the nearby city of Vaasa, where his father set up in timber trade.

After graduating from secondary school in 1922 and completing his military service, Turja went on to study law at the University of Helsinki, obtaining his law degree in 1929 and qualifying as Varatuomari (Master of Laws with court training, cf. barrister) in 1932.

== Journalistic career ==
Turja is perhaps best known as the Editor-in-Chief of the weekly news and political commentary magazine Suomen Kuvalehti, which he led from 1936 to 1951. In addition to that, he also held the same post at two other weekly magazines, Kansan Kuvalehti (1929—1934) and Uusi Kuvalehti (1952—1963). Collectively, his career of running three notable and influential magazines over a period more than thirty years has been described as "unparalleled" in Finnish journalism.

Afterwards, Turja wrote columns for the Apu magazine for 27 years, into the early 1990s.

Turja has been credited with introducing investigative journalism to Finland, and promoting it throughout his career. He was also a known advocate of freedom of speech.

== Bibliography ==
Turja's major literary works include:

=== Books ===
- Ruijanrantaa ja Ruijanmerta (1928)
- Johannes Renko, Ylioppilas (1938), with stage adaptation in 1958

Johannes Renko remains Turja's only novel. His editor at the time, Mika Waltari, is known to have been unimpressed by the quality of his prose, and actively encouraged Turja to become a dramatist instead.

Much of his extensive causerie and column production was also republished in book format as anthology collections, in at least nine separate volumes.

=== Plays ===
- Tuomari Martta (1938), adapted to 1938 film Tuomari Martta
- Särkelä itte (1944), adapted to 1947 film Särkelä itte
- Isä ja poika (1958)
- Päämajassa (1966), adapted to 1970 film Päämaja
- Jääkäri Ståhl (1978), adapted to 1981 opera by the same name, composed by Ilkka Kuusisto

== Honours and awards ==
In 1967, Turja was awarded the Pro Finlandia medal of the Order of the Lion of Finland.

In 1970, the honorary title of Professori was conferred on Turja.

He was also recognised with several notable literary and cultural awards.

== Personal life ==
In his student years, Turja was a member of the Finnish nationalist Academic Karelia Society.

He was married to Salli née Alanen (m. 1930 — her death in 1993), and they had four children.

During both the Winter and Continuation Wars, Turja served in the military communications corps of the Finnish Army, reaching eventually the rank of Kapteeni (Captain).

He was a long-time friend of President Urho Kekkonen, whom Turja had first met when publishing Kekkonen's writings (under the pseudonym 'Pekka Peitsi') in Suomen Kuvalehti.
