= Hyvät ja huonot uutiset =

- Presented by: Henkka Hyppönen
- Starring: Henkka Hyppönen; Mikko Kuustonen; Niina Lahtinen; Tuomas Kyrö; Miika Nousiainen; Juha Vuorinen
- Country of origin: Finland
- Original language: Finnish
- No. of seasons: 7
- No. of episodes: The First Season; 19

Production
- Running time: 45 minutes

Original release
- Network: Nelonen
- Release: January 18, 2012-

Hyvät ja huonot uutiset ("Good and Bad News") is a Finnish comedy panel game television show airing on channel Nelonen on Wednesday evenings.

The show first aired on January 18, 2012 featuring the presenter Henkka Hyppönen and regular panelists Mikko Kuustonen, Pirjo Heikkilä, Tuomas Kyrö, Miika Nousiainen and Juha Vuorinen. Also, a famous celebrity appears as a guest panelist in every episode. At the start of the second season of the series, Pirjo Heikkilä was replaced by Niina Lahtinen. The series has been compared to a panel game show Uutisvuoto, portrayed by YLE TV1 in Finland since 1998.
