= Marjo Rein =

Marjo Rein (born 1967) is a Finnish news presenter and television personality. She is best known as the host of the show Yle Uutiset, by the Finnish Broadcasting Company.
