= BUU-klubben =

Swedish-Finnish children's TV show

- Genre: Children
- Country of origin: Finland
- Original language: Swedish

Production
- Production location: Helsinki, Finland
- Running time: 30 minutes
- Production company: Yle

Original release
- Network: Yle Fem
- Release: 1997 – present

BUU-klubben is an ongoing Swedish-speaking Finnish magazine-type children's TV show shown on Yle Fem. It is shown every weekday at 6:00 PM since 1997. BUU-klubben consists of short programs to be performed and each day of the week has its own program. For example, the Thursday program included the magazine-style program Oppåner å hitådit for several years. Children's films, such as Bamse and the City of Thieves (Bamse och tjuvstaden), have also been shown in connection with BUU-klubben.

"BUU" part of the program's name is an acronym for Barn, Ungdom and Utbildning (lit. 'Children, Youth and Education').

== Selected programs ==
- Bärtil
- Hittehatt
- The Moomins (1978) (Mumintrollen)
- Moomin (1990) (I Mumindalen)
- The Little Mole (Mullvaden)
- Oppåner å hitådit
- Pettson and Findus (Pettson och Findus)
- What’s the Big Idea? (Vad i all världen?)

== See also ==
- Pikku Kakkonen – Finnish children's TV show
