= Jussi Raatikainen =

Finnish journalist and politician (1898–1978)

Juho (Jussi) Raatikainen (12 October 1898, Kivijärvi - 13 September 1978) was a Finnish journalist and politician. He served as Deputy Minister of Agriculture from 29 July 1948 to 17 March 1950 and Deputy Minister of the Interior from 30 July 1948 to 17 March 1950. He was a member of the Parliament of Finland from 1936 to 1951, representing the Social Democratic Party of Finland (SDP). His son, Erkki Raatikainen, was also a journalist and politician.
