= Pikku Kakkonen =

Finnish children's TV show

- The logo of Pikku Kakkonen used since 1983.
- Also known as: Little Number Two
- Genre: Children
- Country of origin: Finland
- Original language: Finnish

Production
- Production location: Tampere, Finland
- Running time: 60 minutes
- Production company: Yle

Original release
- Network: Yle TV2
- Release: 11 January 1977 – present

Pikku Kakkonen (Finnish for "the little number two") is an ongoing Finnish magazine-type children's TV show shown on Yle TV2. The first episode aired on 11 January 1977. It finished with a bedtime story read by the late Lasse Pöysti (1927–2019) and an East German Sandman animation, setting the format for hundreds of later episodes. Currently the series airs twice a day (mornings and evenings) on weekdays and once a day (mornings only) on weekends.

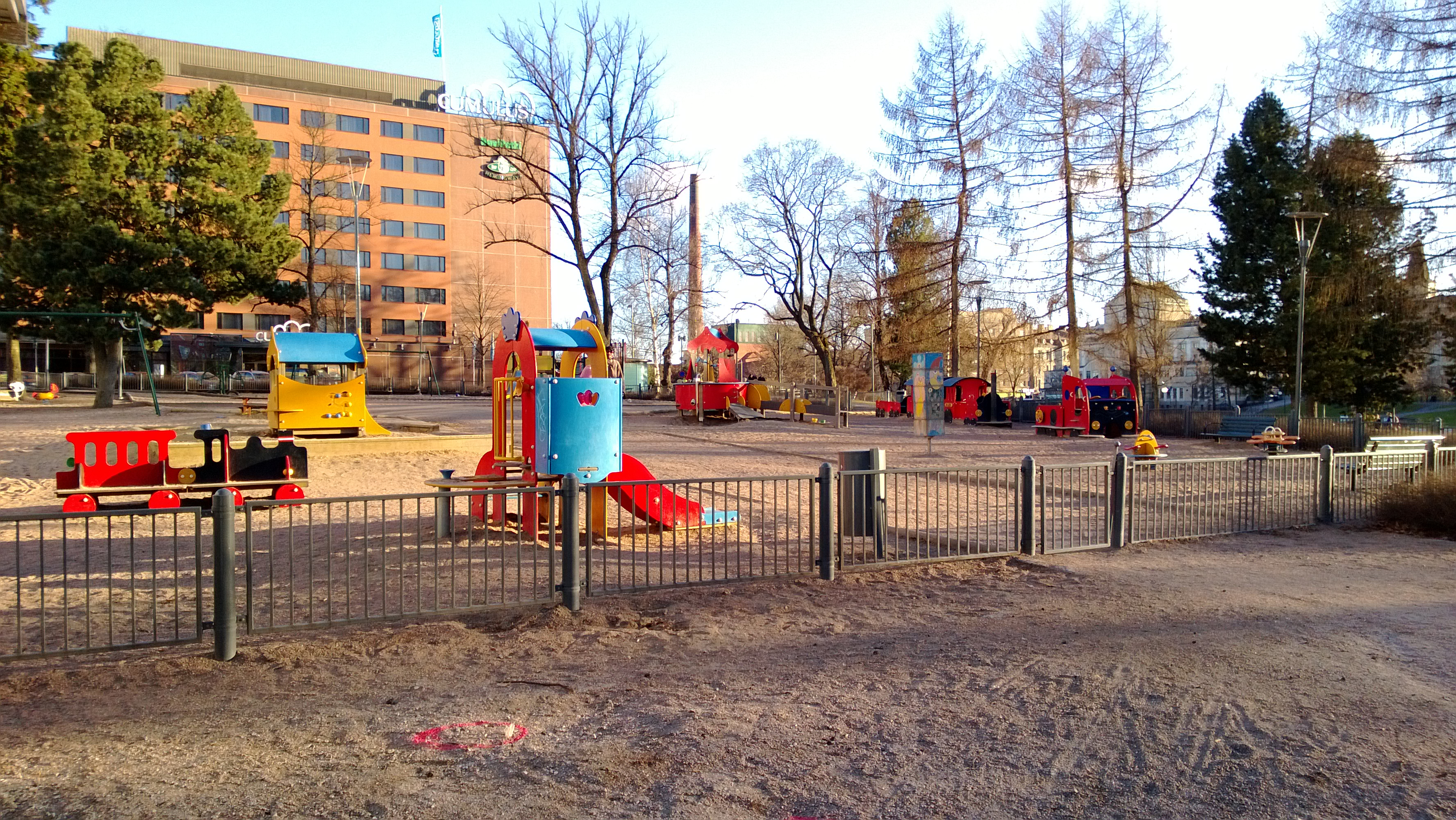
A Pikku Kakkonen themed playground in Tampere.

The Pikku Kakkonen show is recorded in Tampere, and its signature melodies (The Pikku Kakkonen mail tune and the main title tune) have been made into mobile phone ringtones. On October 25, 1983, Pikku Kakkonen introduced a new logo that consists of a crescent moon, a flower, a teddybear, a doll, a ghost, a fish, and a bird which join together to form the number 2 (to denote TV2). Pikku Kakkonen's intro animation was created by Camilla Mickwitz (1937–1989) who was responsible for designing and animating the stop-motion opening and ending sequences. This logo has become a trademark symbol of Pikku Kakkonen and has not changed since.

A variety of live-action and animated television series, both domestic and imported, air as part of Pikku Kakkonen. The imported series are mainly animated and have all been dubbed and localized into Finnish. The domestic series are mainly live-action. Pikku Kakkonen is targeted at an audience of preschool and elementary school-aged children. Since 2005, it has a counterpart for older children called Galaxi which also airs on Yle TV2. Galaxi broadcasts live-action and animated television series both from Finland and overseas, all in the Finnish language.

Pikku Kakkonen was awarded the Golden Venla (Kultainen Venla) in 2011 and 2012 as the "best children's TV show of the year".

== Characters and series ==
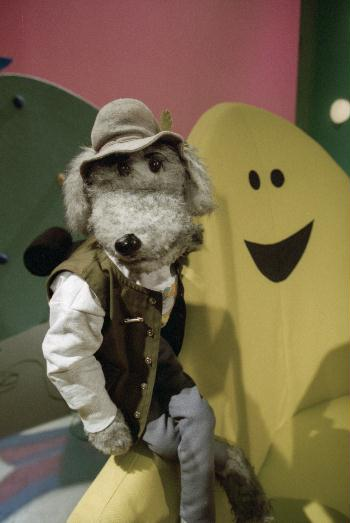
Ransu Karvakuono, one of the show's mascots, in 1995

- Sandmännchen (Nukkumatti)
- Käytöskukka
- Kössi Kenguru
- Pat ja Mat
- Pelle Hermanni from 1978
- Karvakuonot: Ransu, Eno-Elmeri and Riku, from 1978
- Nalle Luppakorva from 1979
- Barbapapa
- Lohikäärme Justus
- Taikuri Savinen
- Timo Taikuri from 1979
- Rölli from 1986
- Foxy Fables
- Ti-ti Nalle from 1989
- Moomin
- Taikuri Luttinen from 1995
- The Busy World of Richard Scarry
- Grimms' Fairy Tales from 1997-1999
- Urpo ja Turpo from 1998
- Elf Toljander
- Maisy (Maisa-hiiri)
- Pingu
- Ricky Rapper (Risto Räppääjä)
- Noddy (Lelumaan Niksu)
- Postman Pat (Postimies Pate)
- Caillou (Kaapo)
- Jakers! The Adventures of Piggley Winks (Vekarat)
- Harry and His Bucket Full of Dinosaurs (Harri ja dinot)
- Lunar Jim (Kimmo Kuu)
- Floogals (Fluugalaiset)
- Peppa Pig (Pipsa Possu)
- My Friends Tigger & Pooh (Ystäväni Tiikeri & Nalle Puh)
- Roary the Racing Car (Lauri kilpa-auto)
- SamSam (Samsam)
- Planet Cosmo (Planeetta Kosmo)
- Paw Patrol (Ryhmä Hau)
- Kit and Kate (Killi ja Kiki)
- Monster Math Squad (Matikkahirviöt)
- Runoja ja Rusinoita from 2017
- Reppu-Heppu ja Botti from 2021
- Pikku Kakkosen iso peli from 2024 (Game show)

Many of these have been spun off as separate TV shows, theatre films or books. Currently, Ti-Ti Nalle music videos no longer air on Yle TV2 or as part of Pikku Kakkonen; rather, they air on C More Juniori between programs.

== See also ==
- BUU-klubben – Swedish-Finnish children's TV show
