= Apu (magazine) =

Weekly family magazine in Finland

- Categories: Family magazine
- Frequency: 49 issues per year
- Circulation: 148,491 (2013)
- Founder: Yrjö Lyytikäinen
- Founded: 1933; 93 years ago
- Company: A-lehdet
- Country: Finland
- Based in: Helsinki
- Language: Finnish

Apu (Finnish for 'help, assistance') is a Finnish family magazine published in Helsinki, Finland. The magazine is known for its columns, an anecdote column called "Nitrodisko", its crosswords, and the weekly "Missä Jallu luuraa?" ('Where is Jallu hiding?').

== History and profile ==
Apu was founded in 1933 by Finnish publisher A-lehdet. It was the first magazine of A-lehdet, now a large publishing group with a portfolio of 18 magazines. It was founded during a recession to help the unemployed persons, who were its exclusive resellers, hence its name meaning 'help' in Finnish. The founder and first editor-in-chief was Yrjö Lyytikäinen. The magazine is based in Helsinki and is published 49 issues per year. In 2009 its editor-in-chief was Matti Saari. Juha Vuorinen has been a columnist for the publication since April 2016.

== Circulation ==
Apu had a circulation of 224,500 copies in 2006. In 2007 the magazine had a certified readership of 683,000 and its circulation was 215,525 copies. The 2010 circulation of the magazine was 168,780 copies. Its circulation was 160,277 copies in 2011 and 149,050 copies in 2012. In 2013 Apu was the fifth best-selling magazine in Finland with a circulation of 148,491 copies.

== Personnel ==
Notable editors have included, alphabetically:

- Veikko Ennala (1950s–1960s)
- Eve Hietamies
- Heikki Hietamies (1979–)
- Kaarina Helakisa (1969–1972)
- Juha Itkonen
- Matti Jämsä (1953–?)
- Yrjö Lyytikäinen (1933 founder and first editor-in-chief)
- Juha Numminen (special editor 1984–1988, editor 1998–2003)
- Arto Paasilinna (1968–1970)
- Matti Saari (current editor-in-chief)
- Markku Veijalainen (editor-in-chief 1995–1999)

Notable columnists have included:

- Heidi Hautala
- Paavo Lipponen – satrap-stir about third column in Apu in spring 2004
- Arto Paasilinna (1975–1988)
- Erkki Raatikainen
- Yrjö Rautio
- Ilmari Turja
- Juha Väätäinen (1970s)
- Juha Vuorinen
