= Piia Pasanen =

Finnish journalist and Yle's news anchor (born 1973)

Piia Pasanen (born 17 April 1973, in Kuopio) is a Finnish journalist and news anchor for Finnish public broadcaster Yle. She previously worked as a sports reporter for Urheiluruutu, before becoming a TV news reporter.

Pasanen hosted Yle TV2's Poliisi:tv (Police:tv) in the 1990s and Tango Market in the 2010s. She has also hosted the Independence Day Reception on Finnish Independence Day on multiple occasions.

She is married to Tomi Einonen, editor-in-chief of MTV Uutiset. They have two children.
