= Yle tax =

Finnish tax collected to fund public broadcasting

Yle tax for a person in Finnish

The Yle tax (Finnish: yleisradiovero, Swedish: rundradioskatt) is a Finnish tax collected yearly to fund the operation of the country's public broadcasting company, Yle. The tax has been collected since 2013, when it replaced the television licence payment (televisiomaksu, televisionsavgift). On this year, a total of €487 million was collected from roughly 4 million taxpayers. Citizens are subjected to the tax regardless of whether they uses Yle's services or not. The amount is dependent on income, and ranges from €0 to €160 for individuals over the age of 18, and €0 to €3000 for businesses as of 2025.

== History ==
Initially in 2013, the tax was steeper, with an income of only €20,588/year qualifying the payer in the highest €140 bracket. Next year, the maximum was raised to €143.

In 2016 and 2018, the income requirements were raised, freeing many low-income citizens from the tax.

== Views ==
Entrepreneurs are subjected to the tax twice through both individual and business taxation. Due to how taxable income is calculated, an entrepreneur may end up having to pay the business tax even if the company is unprofitable. Mikael Pentikäinen, the CEO of Suomen Yrittäjät ry (Finnish Entrepreneurs, registered association), has criticized the tax as unreasonable to businesses. According to a gallup of entrepreneurs, only 15% found Yle's services useful to their business.

In 2015, Sanoma chairman Antti Herlin criticized the tax as less fair than the previous TV license system, under which only users of the service paid.

Notable finnish newspapers Keskisuomalainen and Kaleva share similar criticisms: in 2016, Keskisuomalainen framed the high tax as a "victory of public broadcasting over independent news", and accused Yle of "being a mouthpiece for politicians in a symbiotic relationship". It proposed that part of the funds should be used on subsidies for newspaper delivery.

According to Kalevala, funds being cut from other sources of media while preserving Yle's funding, means that politicians are embracing Yle with a tighter grip. Yle's aspirations to become a market leader are viewed as highly disruptive to other sources of media.

== See also ==
- Finnish Government
