= Rudolf Koivu =

Finnish illustrator and painter (1890–1946)

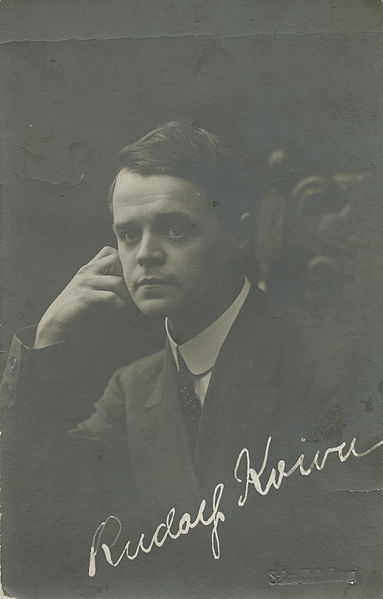
- Born: 1890; St. Petersburg
- Died: 1946 (aged 55–56); Helsinki
- Occupations: Illustrator, painter
- Known for: Illustrating books of fairytales for children

Rudolf Koivu (1890–1946) was a Finnish illustrator and painter, best known for illustrating books of fairytales for children, which are enduringly and timelessly popular.

== Biography ==
He was born in St. Petersburg.

He illustrated stories by Zacharias Topelius, Anni Swan and Hans Christian Andersen, among others.

Koivu died in Helsinki in 1946. In his honor, the Rudolf Koivu Prize was established in 1949. It is awarded biennially to Finnish illustrators of children's books.
