= Yle =

Finnish national public broadcaster

Coordinates: 60.203135°N 24.92549°E

Yleisradio (Finnish); Rundradion (Swedish)
- Logo used since 2012
- Type: Terrestrial radio, television, OTT and online
- Country: Finland
- First air date: 1926
- Availability: Finland (The Nordics and the rest of the European Union if one's registered place of residence is in Finland)
- Founded: 29 May 1926; 100 years ago (Radio); 1 January 1958; 68 years ago (Television)
- Motto: Kaikille yhteinen, jokaiselle oma (Common to all, unique to everyone)
- Market share: 40.3% of Finnish television viewers and 51% of radio listeners (2025)
- Headquarters: Mediatalo, Uutiskatu 5, Pasila, Helsinki
- Regions: See § Regional offices
- Owner: 99.98% state-owned, supervised by an administrative council elected by the Finnish parliament
- Parent: Ministry of Transport and Communications
- Key people: Marit af Björkesten (CEO)
- Launch date: 9 September 1926; 100 years ago
- Former names: O.Y. Suomen Yleisradio / A.B. Finlands Rundradio
- Official website: yle.fi

Yleisradio Oy (lit. 'General Radio Ltd.'; Swedish: Rundradion Ab), abbreviated as Yle (Finnish: [ˈyle]; formerly styled in all uppercase until 2012), translated into English as the Finnish Broadcasting Company, is Finland's national public broadcasting company and news website. Founded as a private enterprise in 1926 and nationalised in 1934, Yle is governed by an administrative council elected by the Parliament of Finland and is structured as a limited company, 99.98% of which is owned by the Finnish state. It employs around 3,000 people in Finland.

Yle operates three national television channels, eight radio services, 23 regional radio stations, a multilingual website, and a multimedia streaming platform. As Finland is constitutionally bilingual—around 5.5% of the population speaks Swedish as their native language—Yle provides content in Swedish through its Swedish-language department, Svenska Yle. Additional content is provided in three Sámi languages and in several other languages.

Yle is primarily funded by an annual tax assessed on Finnish citizens and corporations (the Yle tax). Yle receives no advertising revenue, as all of its services are advertisement-free. In 2025, Yle's annual revenue was about €550 million.

Yle is a founding member of both the European Broadcasting Union and Nordvision, and was also a member of the International Radio and Television Organisation. In 2007, Yle hosted the Eurovision Song Contest in Helsinki.

== History ==
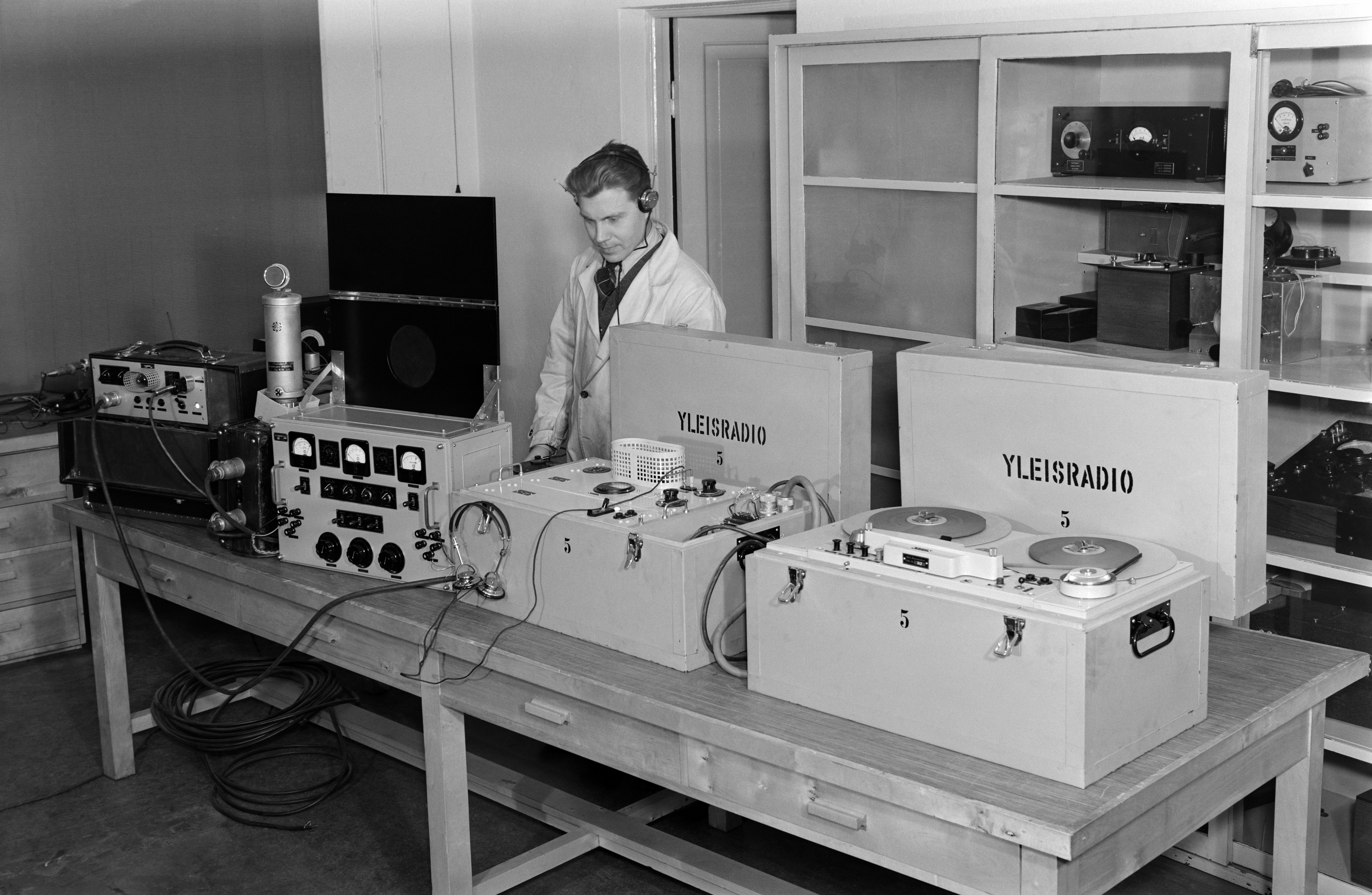
Equipment made in Yleisradio's workshop at the end of the 1930s intended for broadcasting the 1940 Summer Olympics

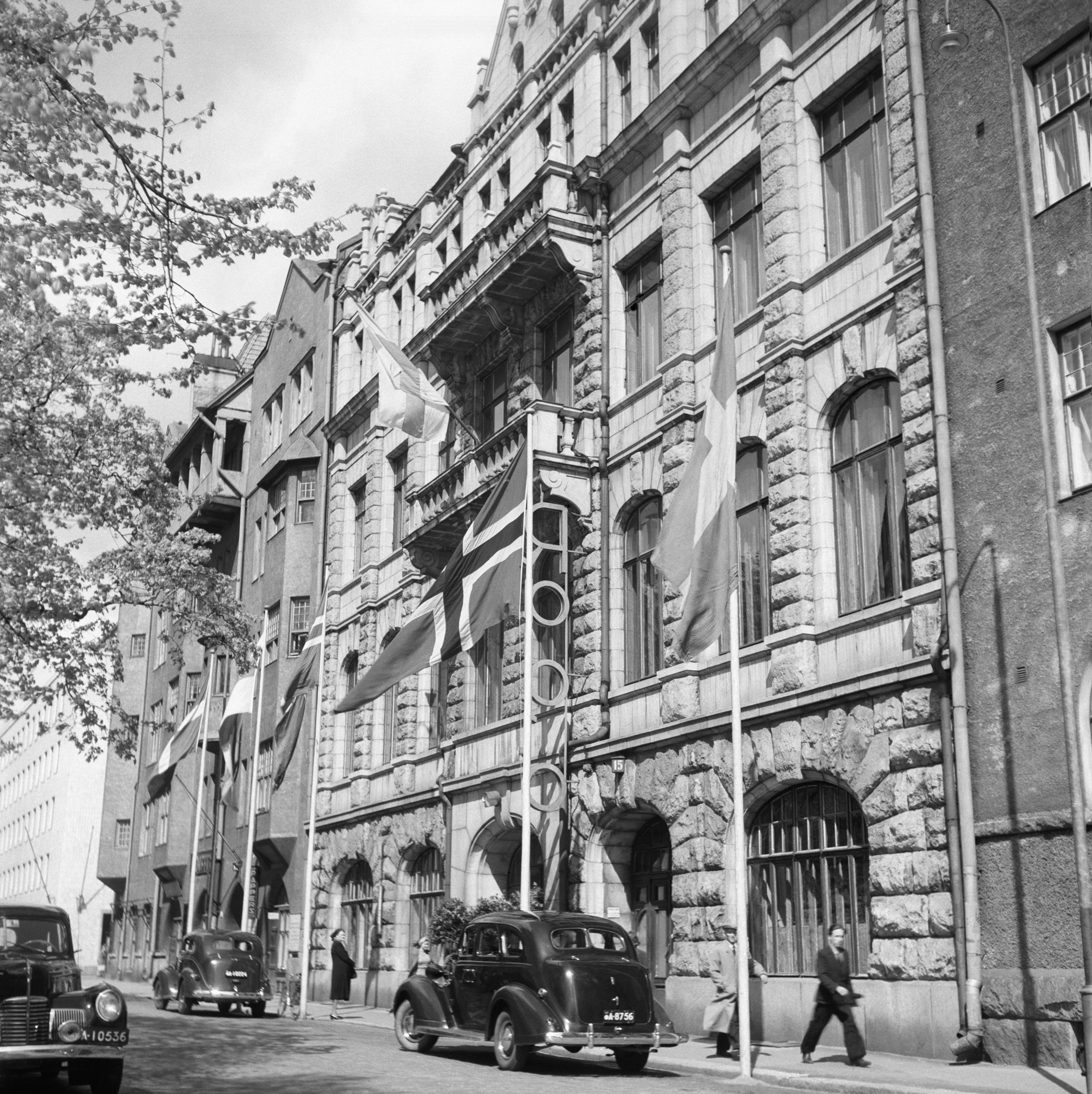
Yle Headquarters, 1933-1968 at Fabianinkatu 15

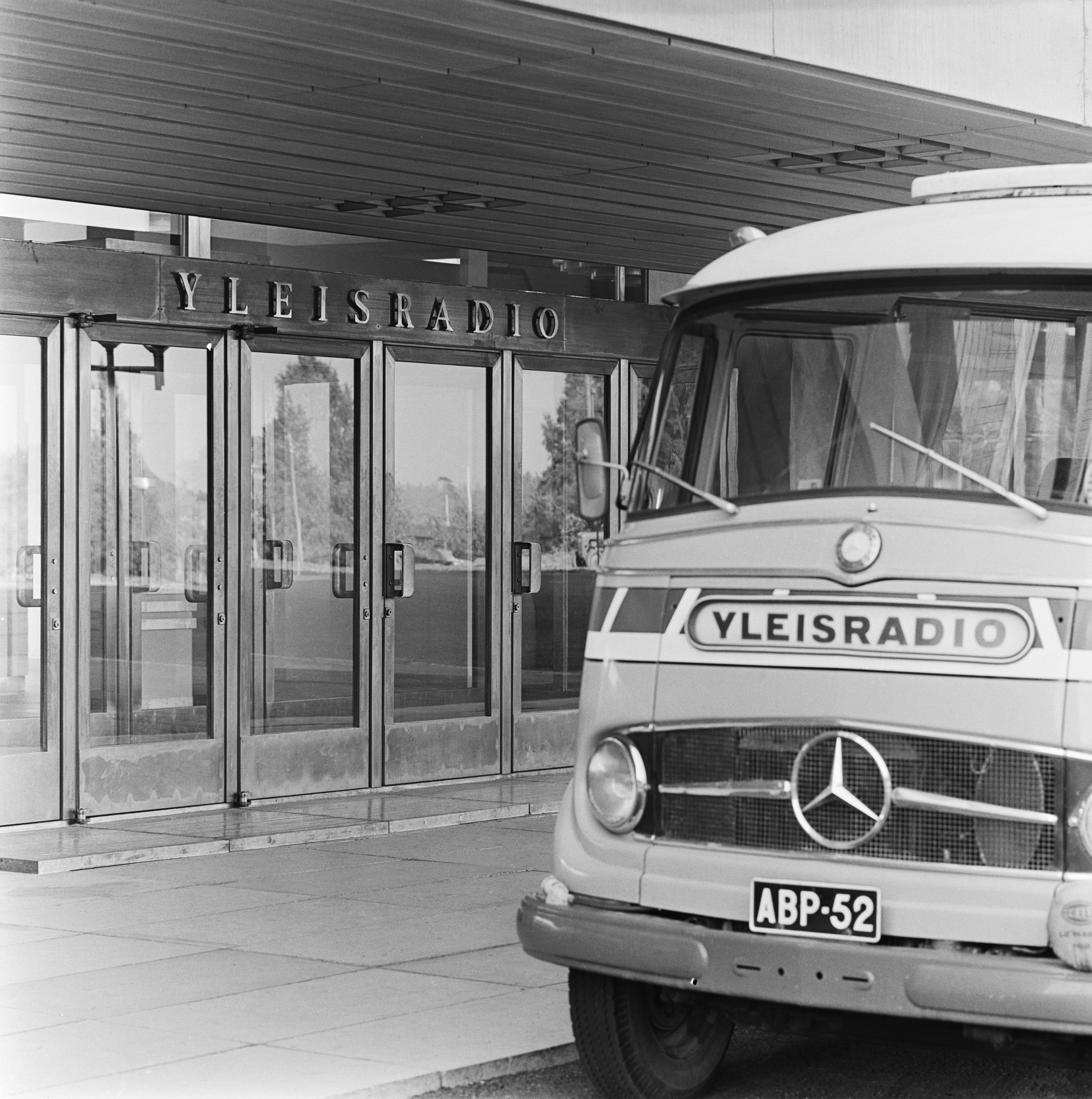
Yleisradio's office building in 1968

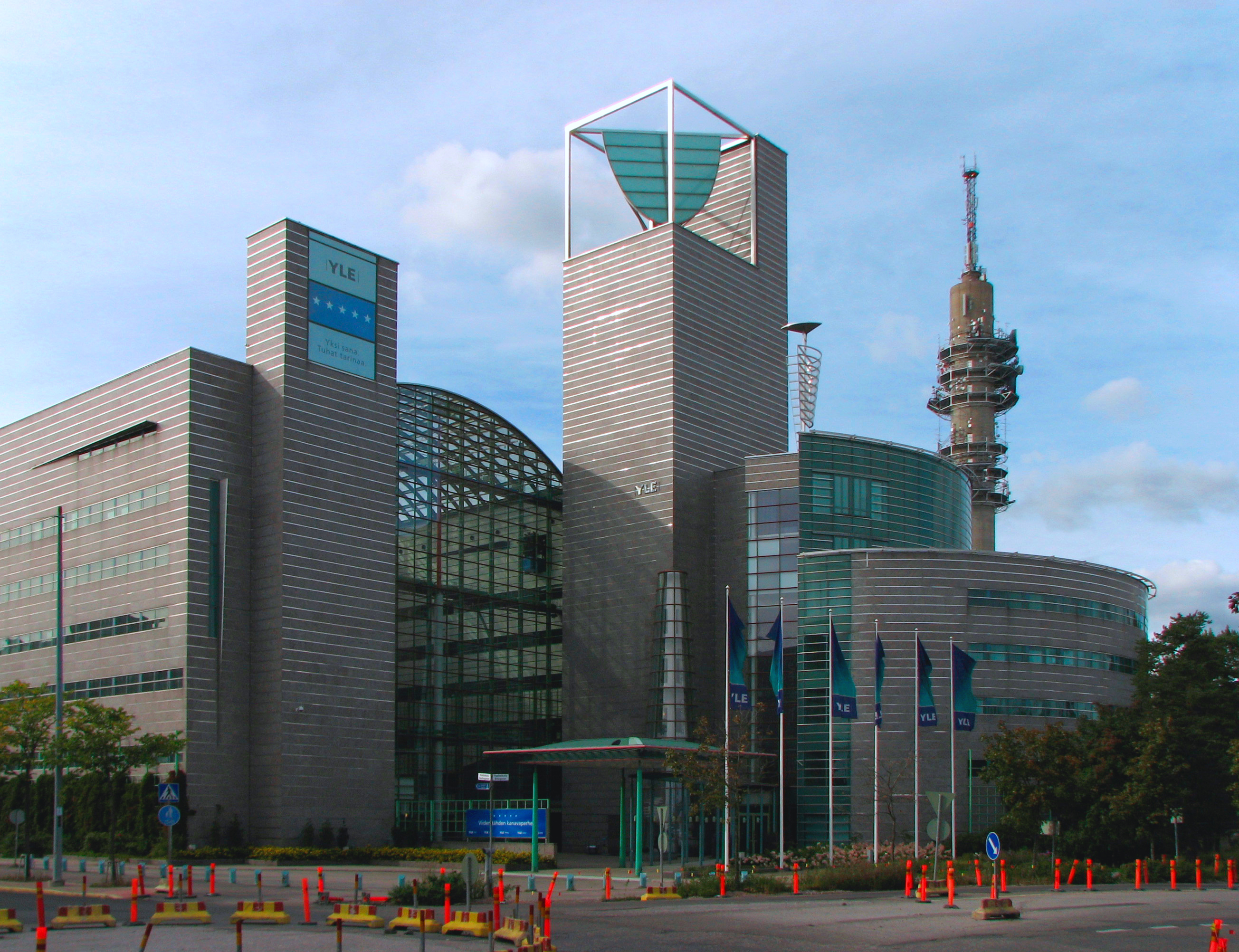
Yle's former headquarters from 1993 to 2016, known as Iso Paja ("the big workshop"), in Pasila, Helsinki, with the Pasilan linkkitorni in the background at right. Now occupied by the VR Group.

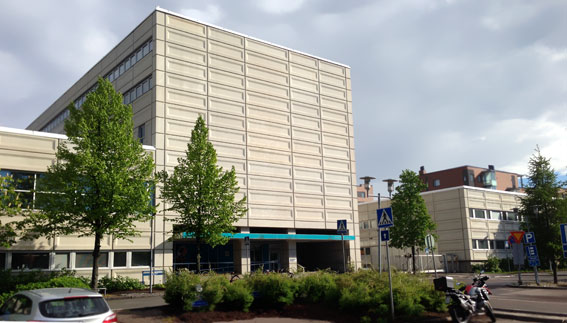
Yle's current headquarters at the Mediatalo (formerly Radiotalo) in Pasila.

=== The beginning ===
Suomen Yleisradio (Finland's General Radio) was founded in Helsinki on 29 May 1926 following more than a year of planning by a commission formed among public and private entities to bring public broadcasting to Finland. The name Yleisradio was taken from the Finnish Defence Forces, where the term yleisradio meant a radio broadcast that could be heard by everyone. The first programme was broadcast on 9 September 1926 from a studio at Unioninkatu 20 using assets purchased the day before from a radio station operated by Suomen Radioyhdistys (the Finnish Radio Association), an advocacy group that had been promoting radio in Finland since 1923. The initial programme contained brief opening remarks in both Finnish and Swedish, followed by music. Daily scheduled broadcasting began on 1 December 1926 with programming between 12:00–13:00 and 18:00–22:00 (17:00–22:00 on Sundays); two evenings per week were dedicated to Swedish programming, with the rest of the schedule in Finnish. Yleisradio broadcast the first radio church service from Tampere Cathedral on September 12, 1926; it is the oldest program still running on Yleisradio.

Before Yle, radio broadcasts in Finland had been made periodically by entrepreneurial organisations and amateur radio clubs such as Radiola in Helsinki from 23 March 1924 and Tampereen radioyhdistys (the Tampere Radio Association) in April 1924. The radio battalion of the Finnish Defence Forces had also established a medium wave (AM band) radio station in Katajanokka at the former Russian Empire Baltic Fleet officer casino (now Katajanokka Casino) in April 1923. Yle's management initially decided to use this site to transmit programming to the Helsinki region, continuing a practice begun by the Finnish Radio Association. Yle transmitted from here until 1930, when a new transmitter was constructed elsewhere in Helsinki.

Yle's primary source of revenue came from the sales of broadcast receiving licences that had been required to own and operate a radio in Finland since 1919. The licences were issued by the Finnish government, but were sold by retailers, organisations such as the Finnish Radio Association, and individual broadcasters. There was thus limited regulation on the sales side. In order to bring more order to licencing, the Parliament of Finland in 1927 passed a law turning the radio licence into a mandatory annual fee to be collected by the Postal and Telegraph Service on all Finnish households owning a radio. Additionally, parliament directed that a portion of licence fee income go to Yle and also codified into law that Yle was forbidden from airing commercial advertising.

By the end of 1927, Yle had agreements to broadcast programming on locally-owned AM radio stations in five Finnish cities, in addition to the initial station in Helsinki. Nevertheless, because these stations transmitted with low power, Yle's programming could only be heard in limited portions of Finland. The completion of the Lahti longwave transmitter in 1928 improved conditions by making Yle's broadcasts available to most of the country through longwave. By the start of the 1930s, 100,000 households had a receiving licence. Coverage was further improved throughout the 1930s by constructing AM stations in additional cities and making upgrades to existing facilities. In 1933, Yle's headquarters moved to Fabianinkatu 15, where they would stay until 1968, when they moved to Ylen Kesäkatu, and then to Iso Paja in 1993.

=== From private to public ===
At the start, Yle was owned by banks, insurance companies, and smaller groups. In total, 59 different entities were shareholders; the Finnish Radio Association owned the most number of shares overall. Wholly private ownership, however, would not last, as the path to nationalising Yle began in early 1929, when Yle declined to air programming commemorating the tenth anniversary of prohibition in Finland, citing a programme policy of political neutrality. Several newspapers and politicians reacted by accusing Yle of bias and being beholden to the commercial institutions that owned it. The Finnish parliament quickly began to discuss the matter.

After five years of debate, the administrative council representing Yle's shareholders agreed in 1934 to transfer a majority of the company's shares to the Finnish government, thereby turning Yle into a state-owned company under the supervision of the Ministry of Public Works and Transport. As majority shareholder, the ministry directed that all licence fee income go to Yle and effectively took over the annual "general meeting" where members of Yle's administrative council were elected. Moreover, Yle became the owner of all local radio stations in Finland; generally, Yle retained the local programming the stations had been airing alongside Yle programming.

=== International expansion ===
In 1937, Yle expanded into international broadcasting by constructing shortwave radio facilities in Helsinki and Lahti for testing purposes and to stake a claim for Finland on internationally allocated frequencies. Reception reports came in from around Europe and as far away as North America, Australia, and New Zealand. The results of the tests convinced Yle to construct a high-power shortwave facility. A site in Pori was selected for this purpose, with construction beginning in 1939. The new facility was to start broadcasting in time for Yle to provide extensive international broadcasts of the planned 1940 Summer Olympics in Helsinki, but the Olympics were cancelled and the outbreak of World War II prevented the facility from being built fully as intended. Nevertheless, shortwave broadcasts from Pori commenced in 1941. Following the war, Yle obtained a powerful new transmitter and constructed an antenna array technically superior to what had originally been planned. An official inauguration of the facility followed in 1948. By the end of 1950, Yle had decommissioned the Helsinki and Lahti facilities and transferred all shortwave broadcasts to Pori, where they remained until 1987, when Yle constructed a new facility in a rural setting west of Pori. Yle then used this site until completely eliminating shortwave broadcasts at the end of 2006.

=== Second World War ===
World War II impacted Yle in several ways. The large amount of new equipment Yle had purchased in anticipation of the 1940 Summer Olympics was instead directed for use in wartime programming. In terms of content, Yle temporarily suspended most light entertainment programming and shifted to an emphasis on cultural and informative programming with a serious tone. Entertainment programming that remained was strategically scheduled to compete with Finnish-language programming broadcast by Finland's adversaries. A large portion of Yle's weekly schedule during this time—up to 59% in 1941—contained programming not produced by Yle itself, but by other government entities. This included programming produced by the Finnish Defence Forces for reservists and troops serving on the front lines as well as foreign-language propaganda intended for international audiences produced by the Council of State Information Centre during the Winter War and the State Information Agency during the Continuation War. Following World War II, Yle's schedule returned to generally only airing programming produced by Yle, though foreign-language content contributed by the State Information Agency (followed by the Ministry for Foreign Affairs from 1949) remained on the shortwave service.

The war also affected Yle's infrastructure. The Soviet Union viewed the Lahti longwave station as strategically important to Finland and bombed the transmitter during the Winter War, forcing the station off the air for ten days. Sweden's Radiotjänst aired newscasts in Finnish in the interim. Thereafter, the Soviet Union sporadically jammed the Lahti longwave station, necessitating Yle to undertake a series of countermeasures involving varying the wavelength of the station by small increments. Yle also engaged in jamming of its own in 1942 by attempting to block Finnish reception of radio transmissions from the United Kingdom, which had declared war on Finland in December 1941. During the Continuation War, some Yle radio stations broadcast embedded Morse code signals at five-minute intervals to aid the Finnish Air Force and Luftwaffe with navigation. After Finland ceded territory in the Moscow Peace Treaty, Yle lost its transmitters and associated studios in Vyborg and Sortavala; a replacement facility was built in Lappeenranta. Yle later reactivated stations in Vyborg and Sortavala during the Continuation War, but gave them up in 1944 before the signing of the Moscow Armistice. Shortly before the beginning of the Lapland War, German troops destroyed Yle's station in Rovaniemi. No other stations were directly attacked during World War II, although Yle's transmitter building in Helsinki, headquarters in Helsinki, and station in Oulu suffered damage from nearby bombings.

=== Lex Jahvetti ===
In January 1945, Jalmar Voldemar Vakio (né Hjalmar Woldemar Walldén) resigned as Yle's director general, a position he had served in since 1927. Under company rules, the administrative council alone was to decide on his replacement. In this case, however, the decision process took place concurrent to the 1945 Finnish parliamentary election, in which the Finnish People's Democratic League (SKDL) won the second-highest number of votes and seats. The communist wing of the SKDL wanted one of its members installed as director general and, after the party's relative success in the election, was able to get Prime Minister Juho Kusti Paasikivi to lobby for the selection of Hella Wuolijoki. The administrative council ultimately obliged, naming Wuolijoki as Yle's new director general in April 1945. In the position, Wuolijoki then proceeded to discard Yle's neutral programming policy by creating programmes oriented toward communist viewpoints.

Following the 1948 Finnish parliamentary election, a campaign to reform Yle and effectively remove Wuolijoki for her actions was started by Yrjö Kilpeläinen, a member of parliament representing the Social Democratic Party of Finland who himself had hosted a popular talk show on Yle earlier in the 1940s under the pseudonym Jahvetti. His effort led to the passage of a law known as Lex Jahvetti. It gave parliament the sole authority to elect Yle's administrative council and stipulated that the council's composition was to be proportional to the partisan makeup of parliament. The first meeting of an administrative council selected under the new law took place in June 1949. Wuolijoki was immediately dismissed as director general and replaced with economist Einar Sundström, who served until 1964 and returned neutrality to Yle's programming policy.

=== Post-war growth and development ===
Driven by Yle providing extensive coverage of the 1952 Summer Olympics in Helsinki, the number of households with a radio licence went up by 68,547 that year, the largest increase on record. Also in the 1950s, Yle began building a national network of FM radio stations as a means of mitigating significant interference experienced on the crowded AM band. This network formed the basis of establishing a new service known as Rinnakkaisohjelma (the Parallel Programme). Compared to the original service, which became known as Yleisohjelma (the General Programme), the new service played more music and had a lighter tone. In 1963, the Parallel Programme began airing the light music programme Sävelradio (Melody Radio) for much of the broadcast day, in part to discourage listening to the emergent offshore radio stations at the time. As even more FM stations came online, another service was launched for the Swedish-speaking coastal regions of Finland to provide a consistent, daily schedule of Swedish programming that contrasted with the irregular scheduling of Swedish content in the General Programme. By the end of the 1960s, Yle had enough active transmitters to allow both the Parallel Programme and the General Programme to be heard on FM throughout most of Finland. Meanwhile, the original AM network was initially kept in operation airing either the General Programme or Swedish programming, but over time AM transmitters were gradually eliminated, with the final one turned off by 2007.

In October 1956, Yle made its first television transmission tests. These continued regularly through 1957 and included a broadcast in February of an ice hockey match between Sweden and Finland as well as the first telecast of the Independence Day Reception at the Presidential Palace on 6 December. Regular television broadcasting began 1 January 1958 under the name Suomen Televisio (Finland's Television), which was later renamed Yle TV1. Like with radio, a licence fee was established for all households owning a television set. Television grew rapidly and was available to 90% of Finland's population by the end of 1962. In 1964, Yle acquired the nearly-bankrupt commercial television channel Tesvisio in Helsinki and its related channel Tamvision in Tampere. Both were merged to become Yle's second television channel, now known as Yle TV2. The headquarters for the channel were placed in Tampere after the city's leadership allocated a site near Tohloppi for the construction of appropriate facilities. In 1969, Yle began test broadcasts of colour television using the PAL standard, but due to high cost, colour only became standard in the late 1970s. On 1 May 1977, Tv-uutiset (TV-news) and TV-nytt switched to colour.

Yle had joined the European Broadcasting Union (EBU) as a founding member in 1950, but its involvement was limited to radio until 1960, when it was connected by microwave via Stockholm to Eurovision and began to participate in programme exchange. It participated in the Eurovision Song Contest for the first time in 1961. Yle was also a founding member of the International Radio and Television Organisation (OIRT) in 1946 and participated in the Intervision programme exchange as the only broadcaster that was ever simultaneously a full member of both the OIRT and the EBU. Additionally, Yle became a founding member of Nordvision in 1959.

=== The Repo years ===
After Einar Sundström stepped down in 1964, Yle's administrative council selected former print journalist Eino S. Repo to be the next director general. Whereas previous directors general served indefinitely, new rules put in place right before this selection moved the position to a five-year term under a political mandate, renewable at the administrative council's discretion. Repo was within the inner circle of President Urho Kekkonen and was therefore backed by the Agrarian League, led by Kekkonen. Under Repo's leadership, the size of Yle increased significantly, going from 600 employees at the start of his term to 3,400 at the end. This increase was tied to a general growth in revenue at the time due to increased ownership of television sets, including of colour sets, which from 1969 were assessed a higher licence fee than black-and-white ones.

Yle's growth under Repo was consequential. For one, Yle began producing its own radio newscasts in 1965, ending the monopoly the Finnish News Agency (STT) had on radio newscast production up to that point (Yle began producing its own television newscasts in 1959). Next, Repo went on to transform the type of programming Yle aired, especially on television, where the amount of mass-appeal entertainment programming was decreased to make way for artistic and informational programming designed to "stimulate thought" around "new ways of seeing reality" and educate audiences to Finland's heritage and culture. Underlying what was called an "informational broadcasting policy" was Repo's pluralistic belief in providing a neutral platform for the expression of all views on a subject, even views considered radical.

Repo's time as director general ended in 1969 after the administrative council opted not to renew his term. He was, however, appointed to a deputy position in charge of radio, a role he served in until 1974. His tenure as director general was controversial, with Yle earning the pejorative nickname "Reporadio" due to his programming policy, for which he was accused of favouring leftist student radicalism and young left-leaning reporters with programmes critical of capitalism that demanded reforms to bring Finland closer to the Soviet Union. In response, parliament soon reduced the power of Yle's director general and passed a law prescribing criminal penalties for the "abuse of broadcasting responsibility". Nevertheless, the size of Yle did not decrease after Repo's term and his programming strategies continued to shape Yle's journalistic work culture into the late 1980s.

=== Strengthening regional and minority-language services ===
Although Yle had aired regional radio programming ever since taking over local stations in 1934, such programming was disorganized and inconsistent from one region to another. Several reforms carried out beginning in the late 1960s attempted to change this. In 1968, regional radio newscasts were introduced across 16 regional divisions. Regional content was further bolstered in the 1970s through the addition of current affairs programming and documentaries. By 1975, Yle began introducing regional radio services operating on their own frequencies separate from the General and Parallel Programmes. Such services, though, only carried regional programming for part of the day, typically in the morning. By the 1980s, regional studios began getting equipped to contribute content to Yle's national television programmes as well.

Services in minority languages were also strengthened during the 1970s. In 1978, the Swedish-language radio service became a full-service network resembling the General Programme, but with content fully in Swedish. Previously, only part of the Swedish service's schedule actually broadcast programming in Swedish; Finnish-language programming aired during gaps. Programming in the Sámi languages was improved in 1973 when Yle opened a studio in Inari and established a Sámi-speaking editorial position there. Yle had been airing content in the Sámi languages since 1948, but in limited quantities broadcast initially from Oulu, then from Rovaniemi beginning in 1960. The distance of both cities to the Sámi homeland of Finland made reception of the programming difficult for its intended audience. The situation was alleviated by moving production to Inari and later establishing a separate FM network—now known as Yle Sámi Radio—in northernmost Lapland for Sámi programming.

=== The monopoly comes to an end ===
In radio, Yle was a de facto monopoly from the time of nationalisation until 1985, when local radio stations were permitted, and maintained a national monopoly until 1995, when commercial national radio networks were allowed. In television, Yle had a monopoly on transmission infrastructure and broadcast licences—but not programming—from 1964 until 1986, when the television channel Kolmoskanava launched as a joint venture between Yle, Nokia, and the commercial broadcaster MTV (Oy Mainos-TV-Reklam Ab), which had existed since 1957. Previously, MTV programming aired exclusively on Yle's television channels under an arrangement whereby MTV purchased airtime from Yle, mostly in prime time. This setup reduced the burden of the licence fee alone in funding Yle's operations and accounted for over 20% of Yle's annual revenue by the late 1980s.

Despite the launch of Kolmoskanava, MTV continued to also air programming on Yle's television channels, causing MTV to compete with itself for advertising revenue by having programming air on up to three different channels at once. Seeing this as unsustainable, Yle and MTV came to an agreement in 1989 allowing for MTV to take control of Kolmoskanava and place all MTV programming there. The actual move took place in 1993, resulting in Kolmoskanava rebranding as MTV3. For Yle, losing MTV programming did not immediately cause a change in revenue, because as a concession for receiving a broadcast channel and later a commercial broadcasting licence, MTV had its annual profits taxed from 1993 to 2007 so as to subsidise Yle. What did change was Yle being able to fully control and program its television channels for the first time. This resulted in modifications to the type of programming Yle's television channels aired, since MTV had concentrated on airing popular entertainment largely imported from the United States, whilst Yle concentrated on airing domestic programming of varying genres.

=== 1990s reform and reorganization ===
Competition from new commercial broadcasters as well as growth in technologies such as cable television greatly impacted Yle beginning in the late 1980s, leading to declining market share. As a consequence, a series of reforms designed to restructure Yle were carried out during the 1990s. They culminated in an act passed by parliament in 1993 mandating that Yle's administrative units be reorganized into a managerial structure operating more like a private business. Furthermore, the act specified Yle's legal duties as the sole public broadcaster in Finland. By the time Yle implemented the act's provisions in the mid-1990s, its market share had stabilised.

Further reforms of the 1990s affected Yle's radio and transmission services. Yle's Finnish-language radio services were reorganized in June 1990 when the roots of what had been the Parallel Programme were combined with regional services to form a new service known as Yle Radio Suomi, the General Programme was effectively rebranded as Ylen Ykkönen (now Yle Radio 1), and the frequencies of the former Parallel Programme were used to launch a youth-oriented service called Radiomafia (now YleX). Additionally, Swedish-language radio was increased in 1991 when a second Swedish service was created. Consisting of regional programming under the branding Regionalradion (Regional Radio), the new service differed from the national scope of the original Swedish-language service, which was given the name Riksradion (National Radio). In 1997, the two Swedish services were further reorganised and rebranded when the regional and national services combined to form Radio Vega (now Yle Vega) and a youth-oriented service named Radio Extrem (now Yle X3M) was launched. In 1996, Yle's operations in Åland were transferred to Ålands Radio and TV, and in 1998, Yle's transmitter network and related assets were spun off into a separate company called Digita Oy in order for Yle to finance its upcoming transition to digital television.

=== Entering the digital age ===
In the 2000s, Yle established several new radio and television channels. Digital terrestrial television in Finland launched in 2001 and the changeover from analogue was completed in 2007. During the digitisation process, Yle introduced a completely new television channel, Yle Teema (Yle Theme), and the Swedish-language programming blocks that since 1988 had been branded as Finlands Svenska Television (Finland's Swedish Television, FST) moved from TV1 and TV2 to their own digital channel called YLE FST5 (later renamed Yle Fem). In addition to these four channels (TV1, TV2, Teema, and Fem), a fifth channel, YLE24, was launched in 2001 for 24-hour news programming. This channel was replaced by YLE Extra, a channel attempting to cater to youth, which was in turn decommissioned in 2007. Until 4 August 2008, the fifth channel was used to broadcast Yle TV1 with Finnish subtitles on programmes in foreign languages (without having to enable the TV's or digital set-top box's subtitle function).

Due to proposals drawn up by a working group formed in 2003 by the Ministry of Transport and Communications, the 2000s also brought the most significant changes to the administrative structure of Yle since its founding. Up to this point, Yle's board of directors generally consisted of senior managers from within Yle, chaired by the company's director general (by this time, known as CEO). Starting in 2006, Yle's managers were forbidden from serving on the board of directors. Moreover, the power to elect the CEO was transferred from the administrative council to the board of directors, which would now have its own chair supervising the CEO.

Yle launched its first high-definition television channel in 2011. Known as Yle HD, the channel showed programming from a mixture of Yle TV1 and Yle TV2. The channel was discontinued in 2014 when high-definition versions of all of Yle's television channels were launched, eliminating the need for Yle HD. Yle's television channels continued to also broadcast in standard definition until 2025.

Yle's presence on the internet dates to 1995, when yle.fi was launched; news began to be posted online from 1996. The first instance of a Yle radio service becoming available online also occurred in 1996 with the launch of a continuous live stream of Yle's shortwave service. In 2007, Yle launched the multimedia streaming platform Yle Areena (Yle Arenan in Swedish), providing a repository for live and recorded audio and video content. By 2023, Yle Areena was the most popular streaming service in Finland, having been used by 67% of Finnish consumers in that year.

=== Since 2013 ===
Following years of debate over its continued relevance, the television licence fee was abolished in 2013 (the separate radio licence fee had been eliminated at the end of 1976). A hypothecated tax not specific to reception device and assessed on individual taxpayers and corporations—the Yle tax—was created in its place.

Tight finances and a declining employee count led Yle to sell a portion of its real estate holdings in the 2010s. The largest sale took place in 2016 when Yle sold Iso Paja (lit. 'the Big Workshop') to Yle's pension fund, which then leased the building to a number of different companies, among them VR Group for use as its headquarters. Iso Paja was built in 1993 at the intersection of Radiokatu (Radio Street) and Televisionkatu (Television Street) in Pasila and served as the headquarters of a campus containing several Yle buildings. Following the sale, Yle moved its headquarters into the adjacent Radiotalo (Radio House), opened in 1978 as Yle's primary radio production facility. Radiotalo was renamed Mediatalo (Media House) in 2017 to reflect its new role within Yle.

After the 2023 Finnish parliamentary election, a working group consisting of members of each Finnish political party convened to evaluate Yle's funding level. The outcome was announced the following year in the form of a two-phase budget cut beginning in 2025 with a freeze of Yle's annual budget for three years and continuing in 2026 with an increase in the value-added tax Yle pays from a rate of 10% to 14%. In total, Yle's budget was reduced by about €66 million, representing the largest cut in Yle's history. As a consequence, Yle eliminated nearly 10% of its workforce in 2025 and made a number of programming changes, in particular to Yle Radio Suomi, where most regional programming was discontinued. Other changes included the elimination of announcers on Yle Radio 1 and the elimination of live in-vision continuity on Yle TV1.

A number of initiatives were created to commemorate Yle's centenary in 2026. One involved cooperation between Yle and a consortium of four Finnish universities to carry out the largest-ever academic research project studying Yle's history from a cultural perspective. Further commemorations included Posti Group releasing a set of stamps and the Helsinki Mint issuing a €2 commemorative coin.

=== Logo history ===
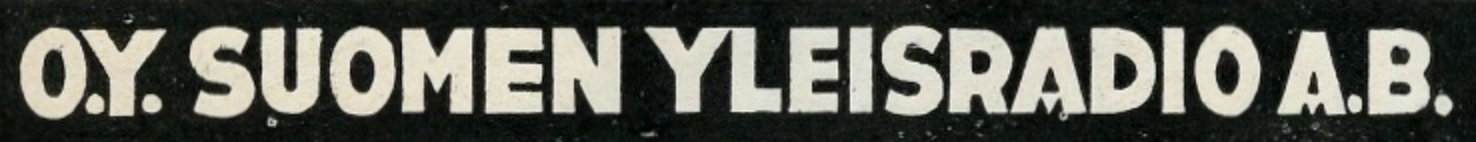
Yle's first logo was used from 1926 to 1940.

Yle's second logo used from 1940 to 1965. Yle Radio Suomi used a modified version of this logo from 2010–12.

Yle's third logo used from 1965 to 1991.

Yle's fourth logo used from May 1990 to 30 September 1999.

Yle's fifth logo used from 1 October 1999 to 4 March 2012.

Yle's sixth and current logo since 5 March 2012.

Variant of Yle's sixth and current logo since 5 March 2012.

Yle's 100th anniversary in 2026

== Governance ==
Yle is governed by a three-tiered administrative structure consisting of an administrative council selected by the Parliament of Finland, a board of directors selected by the administrative council, and a chief executive officer (CEO) selected by the board of directors.

=== Administrative council ===
Yle's highest decision-making body is its administrative council, which oversees the administration of Yle as a company and makes decisions on strategy. The body contains 21 members elected by the Finnish parliament in the first parliamentary session following a parliamentary election. The seats are partisan, and the body's overall composition at the time of election is proportional to the party makeup of parliament. Members begin their term immediately following election and serve until the next election of members, though there are no term limits and a member may be reelected to another term. According to the act establishing Yle as a public broadcaster, members of the administrative council are to be "experts in the fields of science, art, education, business and economics, as well as representatives of different social and language groups". In practice, throughout Yle's history, the administrative council has largely or exclusively been made up of sitting members of parliament.

=== Board of directors ===
Selected by the administrative council, Yle's board of directors contains between five to eight members who are fluent in both Finnish and Swedish and have "sufficiently diverse expertise" related to public service and corporate management. The board of directors oversees Yle's operations. Current members of the administrative council are forbidden from concurrently serving on the board of directors, as are senior managers from within Yle, members of parliament, and government officials.

=== CEO ===
Selected by the board of directors, Yle's CEO manages the company based upon established law as well as directives handed down by the board of directors. The CEO cannot also serve on the board of directors or the administrative council. At other times in Yle's history, the role of CEO has instead been known as director general, managing director, or—simply—director.

==== List of Yle CEOs/directors ====
- L. M. Viherjuuri, 1926–1927 (acting)
- Yrjö Koskelainen, 1927 (acting)
- Armas Deinert, 1927 (acting)
- Jalmar Voldemar Vakio (né Hjalmar Woldemar Walldén), 1927–1945
- Hella Wuolijoki, 1945–1949
- Einar Sundström, 1950–1964
- Eino S. Repo, 1965–1969
- Erkki Raatikainen, 1970–1979
- Sakari Kiuru, 1980–1989
- Reino Paasilinna, 1990–1994
- Arne Wessberg, 1994–2005
- Mikael Jungner, 2005–2010
- Lauri Kivinen, 2010–2018
- Merja Ylä-Anttila, 2018–2025
- Marit af Björkesten, 2025–present

== Services ==
=== Television ===
- Yle TV1: TV1 is Yle's oldest channel and its flagship TV channel. It serves as Yle's main news, current affairs and factual journalism outlet, and also broadcasts documentaries, drama, cultural, and educational programmes. Satirical entertainment, cinema, and shows of British production are also included in its programming. The channel's headquarters are in Helsinki.
- Yle TV2: TV2, founded in 1964, is the main channel for sports, children's and adolescent programming. The channel also broadcasts drama, entertainment, and factual programmes. Emphasis in current affairs output is on domestic items, regional content and citizen journalism. Children's programming includes Pikku Kakkonen (a children's magazine show modelled on BBC's Blue Peter) and Galaxi, its counterpart for older children, and Sirkuspelle Hermanni. The channel's headquarters are in Tampere.
- Yle Teema & Fem: Yle Teema & Fem (Yle Theme & Five) combines the operations of the previously-separate Teema and Fem channels. Teema & Fem is Yle's channel for culture, education, and science. It focuses on recordings of performing arts, classical music, art, history documentaries, films, and thematic broadcasts. The channel also broadcasts Swedish-language news, factual, entertainment, and children's programmes (BUU-klubben). It also shows many Nordic films and series. Finnish subtitles are available for most programmes; they can be enabled using the digital set-top box. Outside prime time, Teema & Fem shows selected broadcasts from Sveriges Television, Sweden's equivalent of Yle.
- TV Finland: TV Finland is a digital satellite channel showing a selection of Yle's programmes in Sweden.
- Yle Text-TV: (Finnish: Yle Teksti-tv) a Teletext channel shows information on news, sports, and TV programmes around the clock. It has theme pages for weather, traffic, work, and leisure.

As is customary in Finland, foreign films and TV programmes (as well as segments of local programmes that feature foreign language content, like news reports) are generally subtitled on Yle's channels. Dubbing is used in cartoons intended for young children who have not yet learned to read; off-screen narration in documentaries is also frequently dubbed.

All of Yle's TV channels are in high definition, as of April 2025. Former, discontinued channels are: Kolmoskanava, YLE24, YLE Extra, YLE TV1+ (2008) and YLE HD (2011–2014).

=== Radio ===
==== Finnish language ====
- Yle Radio 1: A channel for culture, in-depth current affairs, and other speech-based programming. Classical music (concerts by the Finnish Radio Symphony Orchestra), jazz, folk, world music, and religious music also feature. Yle Radio 1 was established in June 1990, as part of Yle's restructuring of its radio channels and was known as Radio Ylen Ykkönen until 2003.
- YleX (formerly Radiomafia): A fast-tempo programme-flow channel featuring new music in tune with popular culture, targeted at 17- to 27-year-olds. The percentage of music is 70%. New domestic and foreign pop, rock, and several themed music programmes.
- Yle Radio Suomi: A full-service format with national and regional news as well as sports and entertainment. Musical fare comprises domestic and foreign hits and adult and nostalgic pop. There are 18 regional variants of Yle Radio Suomi—one for every region of Finland except Åland.
- Yle Klassinen: A classical music service available online and through digital television.

==== Swedish language ====
- Yle X3M: A youth channel for current affairs debate and popular culture, broadcasting news as well. New pop and rock and special music programmes.
- Yle Vega: A full-service format with news, current affairs, and cultural programming for all audience groups. Music genres played include adult pop, jazz, and classical. There are five regional variants of Yle Vega, primarily broadcasting to the areas of Finland where Swedish-speakers form a majority or sizable minority.

==== Sámi languages ====
- Yle Sámi Radio: A network covering most of Lapland. Produced in co-operation with NRK Sápmi and Sameradion. The service does not broadcast Sámi-language programming continuously; at certain times, Yle Radio Suomi is simulcast instead. Languages used are Northern Sami, Skolt Sami and Inari Sami.

==== Multilingual ====
- Yle Mondo: A service available on FM in Helsinki and throughout Finland via digital television that primarily rebroadcasts content from other members of the European Broadcasting Union, particularly BBC World Service in English. Broadcasts in Danish via DR, Estonian via ERR, German via NDR, French via RFI, Norwegian via NRK, and Spanish via RNE are also provided, as is a brief daily newscast in English produced by Yle.

==== Former stations ====
Yle began broadcasting radio in digital using the DAB standard in 1997, but commercial radio broadcasters in Finland showed no interest in the format, causing Yle to discontinue all digital radio broadcasts by the end of 2005. Some services launched exclusively for digital continued to remain available as DVB audio services.

- Yle FSR (Finland's Swedish Radio) Mixkanalen: An automated station that broadcast a mixed selection of programming from both Yle Vega and Yle X3M.
- Radio Aino (1999–2002): Digital station primarily aimed at young adults, especially women, with domestic and foreign pop and rock music, news and current affairs programming alongside lifestyle talk shows.
- Radio Finland (1937–2006): International station on short and medium wave, broadcast in Finnish, Swedish, English, German, French, Russian and a news programme in Latin, Nuntii Latini. The short and medium-wave broadcasts were discontinued on 31 December 2006. Nuntii Latini continued on the internet until 2019.
- YLE Capital FM: Broadcaster combined parts of Yle World and Yle Mondo (in the capital region and parts in Turku, Lahti and Kuopio).
- Yle Puhe (formerly Yle Radio Peili) (1998–2024): A news and current affairs channel presenting talk programmes from Yle's other radio and television channels. Also broadcast on digital television.
- YleQ (2003–2006): Features, political shows, and popular culture programmes for young adults. It replaced Radio Aino. Broadcasting was analogue in Greater Helsinki, digital in southern Finland, and via digital television.

=== Digital ===
- Yle Areena (Swedish: Yle Arenan): A streaming media platform containing live streams of Yle's radio and television services along with on-demand video and audio content. The platform is available in both Finnish and Swedish (including sign language and audio description) and also has brief newscasts in the Sámi languages, Arabic, English (audio-only), Karelian (audio-only), Russian, and Somali.
- Yle Elävä arkisto (transl. Yle Living Archive, Swedish: Yle Arkivet): An internet archive of Yle programming dating as far back as 1935.
- Yle.fi: Yle's official website, providing news in Finnish, Swedish, Sámi, Karelian, English, Russian, and Ukrainian.

== Regional offices ==
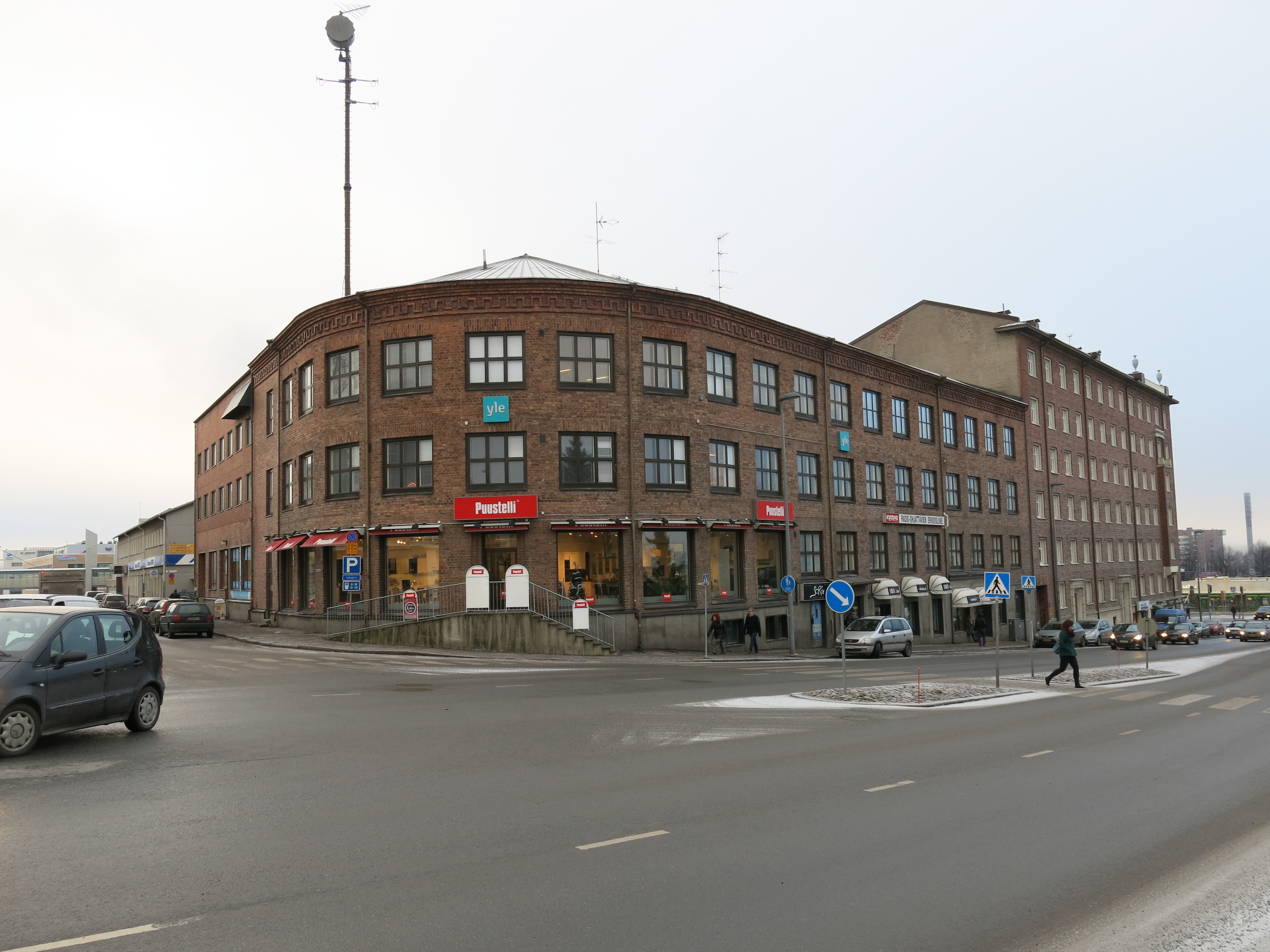
Yle's former regional studio in Tampere.

Yle has editorial offices in all regions of Finland except Åland. Sixteen offices operate solely in Finnish, four operate solely in Swedish, four operate in both Finnish and Swedish, and one operates in Finnish and the Sámi languages. There are an additional seven subsidiary branch offices; six operate in Finnish, while one operates in the Sámi languages. Although Åland has no office and is served by Ålands Radio and TV, most of Yle's television and radio services are available there through the Smedsböle Radio Mast.

=== Finnish-language offices ===
The Finnish-language editorial offices provide content for Yle's Finnish website as well as for Yle newscasts and current affairs programming broadcast nationally. They also provide regional radio and television content, including newscasts and programme inserts on weekdays for Yle Radio Suomi and ten separate regional weekday newscasts that air during regional variation in the Yle TV1 schedule, with repeats airing nationwide the following morning.

Name	Location	Coverage area	Radio service	Television newscast
Yle Helsinki	Helsinki	Uusimaa	Yle Radio Suomi Helsinki	Yle Uutiset Uusimaa (Yle News Uusimaa)
Yle Hämeenlinna	Hämeenlinna	Kanta-Häme	Yle Radio Suomi Hämeenlinna	Yle Uutiset Häme (Yle News Häme)
Yle Joensuu	Joensuu	North Karelia	Yle Radio Suomi Joensuu	Yle Uutiset Itä-Suomi (Yle News East Finland)
Yle Jyväsylä	Jyväskylä	Central Finland	Yle Radio Suomi Jyväsylä	Yle Uutiset Keski-Suomi ja Etelä-Savo (Yle News Central Finland and South Savo)
Yle Jyväsylä	Jämsä (Note: Branch office)	Central Finland	Yle Radio Suomi Jyväsylä	Yle Uutiset Keski-Suomi ja Etelä-Savo (Yle News Central Finland and South Savo)
Yle Kajaani	Kajaani	Kainuu	Yle Radio Suomi Kajaani	Yle Uutiset Pohjois-Suomi (Yle News North Finland)
Yle Kokkola	Kokkola	Central Ostrobothnia	Yle Radio Suomi Kokkola	Yle Uutiset Pohjanmaa (Yle News Ostrobothnia)
Yle Kotka	Kotka	Kymenlaakso	Yle Radio Suomi Kotka	Yle Uutiset Kaakkois-Suomi (Yle News Southeast Finland)
Yle Kotka	Kouvola	Kymenlaakso	Yle Radio Suomi Kotka	Yle Uutiset Kaakkois-Suomi (Yle News Southeast Finland)
Yle Kuopio	Kuopio	North Savo	Yle Radio Suomi Kuopio	Yle Uutiset Itä-Suomi (Yle News East Finland)
Yle Kuopio	Varkaus	North Savo	Yle Radio Suomi Kuopio	Yle Uutiset Itä-Suomi (Yle News East Finland)
Yle Lahti	Lahti	Päijät-Häme	Yle Radio Suomi Lahti	Yle Uutiset Häme (Yle News Häme)
Yle Lappeenranta	Lappeenranta	South Karelia	Yle Radio Suomi Lappeenranta	Yle Uutiset Kaakkois-Suomi (Yle News Southeast Finland)
Yle Mikkeli	Mikkeli	South Savo	Yle Radio Suomi Mikkeli	Yle Uutiset Keski-Suomi ja Etelä-Savo (Yle News Central Finland and South Savo)
Yle Mikkeli	Savonlinna	South Savo	Yle Radio Suomi Mikkeli	Yle Uutiset Keski-Suomi ja Etelä-Savo (Yle News Central Finland and South Savo)
Yle Oulu	Oulu	North Ostrobothnia	Yle Radio Suomi Oulu	Yle Uutiset Pohjois-Suomi (Yle News North Finland)
Yle Oulu	Kuusamo	North Ostrobothnia	Yle Radio Suomi Oulu	Yle Uutiset Pohjois-Suomi (Yle News North Finland)
Yle Pori	Pori	Satakunta	Yle Radio Suomi Pori	Yle Uutiset Lounais-Suomi (Yle News Southwest Finland)
Yle Pori	Rauma	Satakunta	Yle Radio Suomi Pori	Yle Uutiset Lounais-Suomi (Yle News Southwest Finland)
Yle Rovaniemi	Rovaniemi	Lapland	Yle Radio Suomi Rovaniemi	Yle Uutiset Lappi (Yle News Lapland)
Yle Rovaniemi	Kemi	Lapland	Yle Radio Suomi Rovaniemi	Yle Uutiset Lappi (Yle News Lapland)
Yle Rovaniemi	Inari	Lapland	Yle Radio Suomi Rovaniemi	Yle Uutiset Lappi (Yle News Lapland)
Yle Rovaniemi	Kittilä	Lapland	Yle Radio Suomi Rovaniemi	Yle Uutiset Lappi (Yle News Lapland)
Yle Seinäjoki	Seinäjoki	South Ostrobothnia	Yle Radio Suomi Seinäjoki	Yle Uutiset Pohjanmaa (Yle News Ostrobothnia)
Yle Tampere	Tampere	Pirkanmaa	Yle Radio Suomi Tampere	Yle Uutiset Pirkanmaa (Yle News Pirkanmaa)
Yle Turku	Turku	Southwest Finland; Åland (Ahvenanmaa)	Yle Radio Suomi Turku	Yle Uutiset Lounais-Suomi (Yle News Southwest Finland)
Yle Vaasa	Vaasa	Ostrobothnia	Yle Radio Suomi Vaasa	Yle Uutiset Pohjanmaa (Yle News Ostrobothnia)

=== Swedish-language offices ===
The Swedish-language editorial offices provide content for Yle's Swedish website along with regional newscasts and programming for Radio Vega on weekdays. Unlike in Finnish, there are no regional television newscasts in Swedish.

Name	Location (Note: Where English commonly uses a Finnish-language place name, the Swedish-language version of the place name is given in parentheses)	Coverage area	Radio service
Yle Huvudstadsregionen	Helsinki (Helsingfors)	Helsinki capital region; Central Finland; North Karelia; North Savo; Pirkanmaa (Birkaland)	Yle Vega Huvudstadsregionen
Yle Västnyland	Ekenäs	Western Uusimaa (Västnyland)	Yle Vega Västnyland
Yle Åboland	Turku (Åbo)	Southwest Finland; Satakunta; Åboland; Åland	Yle Vega Åboland
Yle Österbotten	Vaasa (Vasa)	Central Finland; Central Ostrobothnia; North Ostrobothnia; Ostrobothnia; Satakunta; South Ostrobothnia	Yle Vega Österbotten
Yle Österbotten	Kokkola (Karleby)	Central Finland; Central Ostrobothnia; North Ostrobothnia; Ostrobothnia; Satakunta; South Ostrobothnia	Yle Vega Österbotten
Yle Österbotten	Kristinestad	Central Finland; Central Ostrobothnia; North Ostrobothnia; Ostrobothnia; Satakunta; South Ostrobothnia	Yle Vega Österbotten
Yle Österbotten	Jakobstad	Central Finland; Central Ostrobothnia; North Ostrobothnia; Ostrobothnia; Satakunta; South Ostrobothnia	Yle Vega Österbotten
Yle Östnyland	Porvoo (Borgå)	Eastern Uusimaa (Östnyland); Kymenlaakso (Kymmenedalen); Päijät-Häme (Päijänne-Tavastland)	Yle Vega Östnyland

=== Sámi-language offices ===
Editorial offices operating in the Sámi languages provide content for Yle Sámi Radio as well as Yle Ođđasat, which airs nationally on Yle TV1.

Name	Location	Coverage area	Radio service	Television newscast
Yle Sápmi	Inari (Aanaar, Aanar, Anár)	Lapland	Yle Sámi Radio	Yle Ođđasat (Yle News)
Yle Sápmi	Utsjoki (Ohcejohka)	Lapland	Yle Sámi Radio	Yle Ođđasat (Yle News)

== Yle tax ==
Yle was long funded by revenues obtained from a broadcast receiving licence fee payable by the owners of radio sets (1926–1976) and television sets (1958–2012) as well as through fees payable by private television broadcasters in Finland (1993–2007). From 1969–1996, owners of colour television sets paid a higher fee than owners of black-and-white sets; in 1996, the black-and-white fee category was abolished and the TV licence fee was renamed the "TV fee". In 2012, the fee was €252 per year. The fee was collected per residence and was the same regardless of how many working television sets the residence had. In contrast, during the time that radio receivers required a licence, portable radios and car radios had to have their own licences.

Since 2013, the TV fee has been replaced by a public broadcasting tax, known as the Yle tax, collected annually from Finnish citizens and corporations. The rationale for the abolition of the former fee was the development of other means of delivering Yle's services, such as the internet, and the consequent impracticality of continuing to tie the fee to the ownership of a specific device.

As of 2025, the main part of the Yle tax is collected from individual taxpayers at a rate of 2.5% of the total amount of net earned and capital annual income exceeding €15,150, up to a maximum tax of €160. Minors and those with an annual income of less than €15,150 are exempt. The tax has an automatic indexing mechanism to account for inflation, although the Parliament of Finland can temporarily freeze the mechanism to keep the tax from increasing year-over-year. The Finnish parliament alone determines the amount of the tax and who must pay it.

The Yle tax does not apply in Åland. As of 2026, individual taxpayers over 18 years old who reside there instead pay a media fee of €128 per year if their net earned and capital income is more than €14,000 for the year.

== Controversies ==
During the finlandisation period, Yle contributed to President Urho Kekkonen's policy of "neutrality" by broadcasting the program Näin naapurissa about the Soviet Union. This program was produced in co-operation with the Soviets and supported Soviet propaganda without criticism.

Eino S. Repo was replaced as director general in 1969 by Erkki Raatikainen, a member of the Social Democratic Party. All directors after him until 2010 were Social Democrats. This was ended by the appointment of the conservative National Coalition Party's Lauri Kivinen as director general in 2010. Kivinen's appointment received much criticism, as he was previously head of Nokia Siemens Networks, which had sold monitoring equipment to the Iranian Ministry of Intelligence, allowing them to arrest political dissidents throughout the protests in the fall of 2009.

English-language newscaster Kimmo Wilska was fired on 13 October 2010 after pretending to be caught drinking on camera following an alcohol-related news story on Yle News. His stunt was not well-received by Yle's management, which fired him that day. Wilska received substantial support after his termination from the company.

Yle has been criticised for buying many HBO series. It has responded by emphasising the suitability of the HBO series to channels with no ad breaks, citing the programming's quality and low price, and stating that American programmes constitute only 7% of its programming.

=== Decision to close shortwave ===
Yle's broadcasts on shortwave radio were ended at the end of 2006. Expatriate organisations had been campaigning for continued service, but their efforts did not succeed in maintaining the service or even in slowing the process. The decision also affected a high-powered medium wave radio station on 963 kHz (312 m). A smaller medium wave station covering the Gulf of Finland region (558 kHz, 538 m) remained on air for one more year.

In November 2005, MP Pertti Hemmilä (N) submitted a question in parliament about Yle's plans to end the availability of shortwave bands internationally. In his question, Hemmilä took up the low cost of the world band radio to the consumer travelling or living abroad. In her response, the Minister of Transport and Communications, Susanna Huovinen (S) noted that Yle would now be available via other means, such as through satellite and the internet. She also underlined the fact that Yle is not under government control, but under indirect parliamentary supervision.

=== Ylegate 2017 ===
The Council for Mass Media in Finland criticised Yle for restricting news reports about Prime Minister Juha Sipilä's investments and business in 2017. Several reporters were barred by Yle's upper management from publishing news stories about the political connections between Sipilä, the companies owned by his relatives and the state financing of the Talvivaara mine owned by Terrafame.

== Notable news anchors ==
- Pietu Heiskanen
- Hanna Visala
- Marjo Rein, 2014–2025
- Kreeta-Maria Kivioja
- Matti Rönkä, 1990–2024
- Tommy Fränti
- Petteri Löppönen
- Ilkka Lahti
- Mikko Haapanen
- Milla Madetoja
- Saija Nironen
- Tuulia Thynell
- Antti Parviala
- Jussi-Pekka Rantanen
- Arto Nurmi, 1983–2015
- Marjukka Havumäki
- Piia Pasanen

== See also ==
- List of radio stations in Finland
- Mass media in Finland
- Television in Finland
