= Sirkuspelle Hermanni =

Finnish children's TV show

The Sirkuspelle Hermanni TV show's intro

Sirkuspelle Hermanni (translates to Hermanni the Circus Clown) is a Finnish children's TV show from 1978–1988 shown on Yle TV2 in the Pikku Kakkonen children's program.

The show's main character is Pelle Hermanni (translates to Hermanni the Clown), a clown who lives in his own trailer at a circus trailer park. He was played by Veijo Pasanen.

There is no major continuing plot, instead the episodes consist of Hermanni talking about his life and daily events in a funny, clownish, somewhat childish way. His comedic antics are further increased by the comically misproportioned props and his way of fumbling over difficult words. Hermanni would often ask questions from his children audience, and then pretend to actually hear what they answered, saying such things like "Right, Annika there knew the answer!"

In most of the episodes, Hermanni is the only human actor shown. Other characters include Vekkari, Hermanni's large alarm clock which starts ringing when Hermanni least wants, and Kepakko, a wooden teacher's staff who feels intellectually superior to Hermanni and often insults him by laughing at him.

Hermanni is especially fond of his dear old mother and the pancakes with strawberries she makes, and he often phones her to see how she's doing. Hermanni's telephone is a large, complex contraption with its own video communications screen. Because the show predates actually feasible real-world video communication by more than a decade, this only adds to the comedy.

Hermanni is in love with Sylvia, the circus's fortune teller, but she has a rival suitor in Max, the circus magician. For most of the show, both Sylvia and Max remained unseen characters, with Hermanni only visiting their trailers where they were not present. In later episodes, both Sylvia and Max were briefly seen.

In September 2022, it was reported that Pelle Hermanni will make his first feature film debut, with Timo Koivusalo directing the film and Vesa Vierikko acting as the title character.
