= Yle (disambiguation) =

Yle is Finland's national public-broadcasting company

Yle or YLE may also refer to:

- Cambridge YLE
- Yle TV1
- Yle TV2
- Yle Teema
- Yle Fem
- Yle Uutiset
- YLE Extra
- Yle Radio Suomi
- Yle Nyheter
- Yle X3M
- Yle Sámi Radio
- Yle Nyheter
- Yle Vega
- Turku Yle Radio Mast

== Other uses ==
- Yle, a colloquial vulgarism for the penis in Georgian language
