= Yle Nyheter TV-nytt =

Swedish-language Finnish television news show

Yle Nyheter TV-nytt (from 1965 to the 1970s Från dag till dag and until 2013 TV-nytt) is the name of the daily television news programmes on the Swedish-speaking Finnish TV channel Yle Teema & Fem, at the Finnish Broadcasting Company (Yle). The programme was also broadcast on TV Finland.

== History ==
TV-nytt began as Från dag till dag on 5 April 1965, broadcasting on either Yle TV1 or TV2 depending on the time and day, and has since provided daily news for the Swedish-speaking population in Finland. TV-nytt adopted its current name in 1975. In the evening TV-nytt has four regular broadcasts: at 16.55, 17.55, 19.30 and the last edition is in the late evening (at 20.57 or 21.57 - lasting only 90 seconds). The main bulletin is at 19.30 and is 25 minutes long.

Between 1997 and 2005, Swedish-language news called Morgonnytt (Morning news) was broadcast during the otherwise Finnish-language Yle breakfast TV programme Aamu-TV (Morning-TV). This was discontinued as part of Yle's budget reduction strategy, despite the fact that Morgonnytt often received more viewers than the evening TV-nytt broadcasts. This move has met with criticism from some parts of the Finland-Swedish community. From early 2010, Yle has again provided short news bulletins from TV-nytt during the morning hours during FST5's breakfast programme Min Morgon. The breakfast programme is funded by Svenska kulturfonden.

Prior to the end of analogue broadcasting in Finland on 31 August 2007, TV-nytt's 18.15 edition was the main bulletin and was simulcast on Yle TV1.

The late edition was shortened from 10 minutes to 90 seconds on 1 September 2011, following a co-operation between FST5 and the Swedish public broadcaster SVT (its channel SVT World).

== See also ==
- Yle Nyheter – a Swedish-language Finnish online news service
