= YLE24 =

- Country: Finland

Programming
- Language: Finnish

Ownership
- Owner: Yle
- Sister channels: YLE TV1, YLE TV2, YLE FST5, YLE Teema

History
- Launched: 27 August 2001
- Closed: 26 April 2007
- Replaced by: YLE Extra

Links
- Website: yle.fi/yle24

Availability

Terrestrial
- Digital: Channel 8

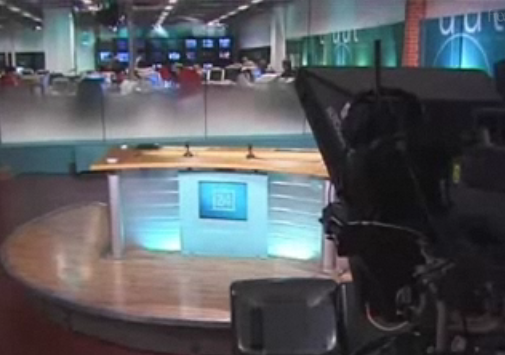
The News studio of YLE24 - Studio24.

YLE24 was a Finnish language TV channel broadcast by Yle. The unit was founded in 2000, and it was active from 2001 to 2007.

== Software ==
YLE24 simultaneously broadcast all the news programmes shown on Yle TV1 and TV2, with the following exceptions:

- TV news, weather and sport started every day at 21.50 on TV2, but at 22.00 on YLE24.
- The late broadcast of TV news was only shown on TV1.

Important sporting events (such as the Olympic Games and the World Championships) and important political events (such as Parliamentary Question Time and the inauguration of the President of the Republic) could change the schedule.

Morning TV was also broadcast simultaneously on TV1 and YLE24. The Morning TV compilation programme, Today in the Headlines, was broadcast on TV2 earlier in the afternoon, but on YLE24 it was shown at 16.05. In addition, the channel's programme included repeats of current affairs programmes. Among others, A-studio and Ajankohtainen kakkonkonen as well as FST's OBS, 360 grader and Närbild were broadcast as reruns.

YLE24 also broadcast other news than its own, such as Euronews and SVT's Finnish-language news for Swedish Finns. When there was no programme on YLE24, the Uutisikkuna (News Window) was broadcast.

== Ending a channel ==
YLE24 was closed down by Yle on 26 April 2007. Its channel slot on digital TV was used to broadcast the now defunct YLE Extra channel. The YLE24 unit continued as YLE News and its programming was transferred to other Yle channels. After the closure of YLE Extra, the channel YLE TV1+ was broadcast on the slot, which transmitted TV1 programmes at the same time as TV1 proper, but with fixed subtitles, while the other YLE channels used DVB-T subtitles. YLE TV1+ was closed on 4 August 2008. Today, the channel is hosted by Liv.

== See also ==
- SVT24
