= Ođđasat =

Northern Sami TV news programme

- Title card until mid-2015
- Also known as: Oddasat; TV-Ođđasat (in NRK radio simulcasts)
- Genre: News
- Presented by: Joni Saijets
- Theme music composer: Röyksopp
- Countries of origin: Nordic countries, mostly Sápmi
- Original languages: Northern Sami (Presenters, voiceovers for most interviews); Bokmål (NRK1 subtitles); Swedish (Hard subs on SVT2, alternate digital subs on Yle TV1); Finnish (Main subs on Yle TV1 and TV Finland)

Production
- Running time: 15 minutes
- Production companies: NRK; Yle

Original release
- Network: NRK1; SVT2; Yle TV1; TV Finland; NRK Sámi Radio
- Release: August 20, 2001 – present

Related
- Sameradion; Yle Sámi Radio

Ođđasat is a Sámi television news programme broadcast in Norway, Sweden and Finland. Jointly produced by NRK, SVT and Yle, the public service broadcasters in their respective countries, the programme is presented from NRK's studio in Norway.

It is broadcast from Monday to Friday, ten months a year. Each programme is around 15 minutes long and deals mostly with Sami issues but also has Nordic and world news, often dealing with other indigenous peoples. Most reports are from the official Sápmi areas; only rarely are there news stories about other places with significant Sámi populations (e.g. Oslo, Umeå) unless the stories also involve Sápmi areas. No Russian companies are known to have been involved in the production or by submitting stories.

As of November 2023, episodes are broadcast more or less simultaneously on NRK1, SVT2, and NRK Sámi Radio in the afternoon, usually at 17:30. Broadcasts in Finland were moved from Yle Teema & Fem to Yle TV1 at some point in the late 2010s, where it airs as a late night newscast; and to TV Finland, where it airs during daytime the following day.

Almost all audio in the program is in Northern Sami; one Southern Sami episode was known to have been broadcast in August 2018.

Each episode concludes with a short weather forecast, focusing on Sápmi and the northern parts of the Gulf of Bothnia, leaving out Oslo and Trondheim but including Murmansk and Lovozero.

== History ==
When the production of the programme began, its titles and graphics were different from NRK's domestic television news bulletins.

In around 2008, the programme saw a new look; while it still differed from the revamped look of the rest of NRK's bulletins at the time, the lower thirds (as well as the subtitles on NRK's broadcast) were set in the same grid of graphics that NRK's bulletins used. It also utilised the Neo Sans typeface (NRK's on-screen typeface at the time) for its presentation. In mid-2015, about a month after NRK's domestic bulletins revamped their look, Ođđasat followed with the new NRK news intro corporate look and theme music.

== See also ==
- Yle Uutiset: Yle produces a separate five-minute television bulletin titled Yle Ođđasat that focuses on the Sámi people in Finland, broadcast weekday afternoons on Yle TV1. Stories from that bulletin are occasionally included in the all-Nordic version as well.
