= YLE Extra =

- Country: Finland

Programming
- Language(s): Finnish

Ownership
- Owner: Yle
- Sister channels: YLE TV1, YLE TV2, YLE FST5, YLE Teema

History
- Launched: 27 April 2007
- Replaced: YLE24
- Closed: 1 January 2008
- Replaced by: YLE TV1+

Links
- Website: extra.yle.fi

Availability

Terrestrial
- Digital: Channel 8

YLE Extra was a Finnish television channel owned and operated by Yle. The channel launched on 27 April 2007. It replaced YLE24. YLE Extra ceased broadcasting on 1 January 2008 and was replaced by YLE TV1+, a temporary channel which broadcasts Yle TV1 with fixed subtitles.

The closure was linked to the financial austerity measures taken by the Finnish Broadcasting Corporation. According to Yle, the channel's audience figures were not good enough. The channel was handed over to YLE TV1+ due to persistent subtitling problems. YLE TV1 had subsequently been shown on two channels, with Extra's channel slot having been subtitled by burning in the picture instead of the previous digital subtitling, so that the problems had ceased to arise. Today, the Extra channel is showing Liv.
