= Finland Swedish =

Dialects of Swedish spoken in Finland

- Fenno-Swedish
- finlandssvenska
- Unofficial flag of the Swedish-speaking Finns
- Region: Western and southern coast of Finland, Åland
- Ethnicity: Finland Swedes
- Language family: Indo-European: Germanic; North Germanic; East Scandinavian; Swedish; East Swedish; Finland Swedish

Official status
- Regulated by: Institute for the Languages of Finland

Language codes
- ISO 639-3: –
- Glottolog: east2303
- IETF: sv-FI

Finland Swedish or Fenno-Swedish (Swedish: finlandssvenska; Finnish: suomenruotsi) is a variety of the Swedish language and a closely related group of Swedish dialects spoken in Finland by the Swedish-speaking population, commonly also referred to as Finland Swedes, as their first language.

For the most part, these dialects and the dialects spoken in Sweden are mutually intelligible, although some archaic dialects in Ostrobothnia are practically unintelligible to Swedish-speaking people in southern Finland (and in Sweden). Most Swedish-speaking Finns emphasize that Finland Swedish is not a separate language from the Swedish of Sweden. The Swedish dialects in Finland are considered varieties of Swedish, and the norm for written Standard Swedish is completely applicable also for Finland Swedish. Today, Swedish dialects are spoken in four different regions in Finland: Ostrobothnia, Åland, Southwest Finland and Uusimaa.

Swedish as spoken in Finland is regulated by the Swedish Department of the Institute for the Languages of Finland. This regulation includes the officially stated aim of keeping Finland Swedish close to the Swedish as spoken in Sweden and strongly phrased advice against loanwords and calques from Finnish, which are usually incomprehensible to Swedes.

In the spoken vernacular, especially among young people in Finnish-dominated areas, Finnish loanwords as well as calques from Finnish are frequently incorporated into Finland Swedish. There are also some words in Finland Swedish that would be considered slightly archaic in Sweden. Some government and public service terms that have been created in recent centuries also differ. The same is true of other new words, notably loanwords from English.

Any language adopts features, especially pronunciation habits, from dominant languages it comes in touch with, but many of the traits of Finland Swedish exist also in monolingual areas and some are in fact preserved features of Old Swedish, as with Scots in comparison with English or Afrikaans in comparison with Dutch.

== History ==
More than 17,000 Swedish-speaking Finns live in officially monolingual Finnish municipalities, and are thus not represented on the map. Officially monolingual Finnish-speaking municipalities Bilingual municipalities with Finnish as the majority language Bilingual municipalities with Swedish as the majority language Monolingual Swedish-speaking municipalities (Åland) Sami bilingual municipalities

Finland Swedish was a result of Swedish colonisation of Finland during the Northern Crusades in the 12th to 14th centuries. Colonisation focused on the Finnish archipelago and some of its coastal regions. This colonisation led to the beginning of the Swedish-speaking population of Finland.

From the 16th century, Swedish was the main language of jurisdiction, administration and higher education in Finland (which was then a part of Sweden), but the majority of the population in the Finnish inland spoke Finnish outside of these sectors of society, i.e. in normal, daily life. Additionally, the Estonian island of Naissaar had lost its original Estonian Swedish population by the early 1700s. It was resettled in 1748 by Finland Swedish farmers from Uusimaa who brought the Nyland dialect with them.

In 1809, when Finland was conquered by the Russian Empire and became an autonomous Grand Duchy, Swedish remained the only official language. In 1863, both Finnish and Swedish became official languages with equal status, and by the time of Finland's independence in 1917, after a Finnicization campaign by the Fennoman movement, Finnish clearly dominated in government and society.

Finland has since then been a bilingual country with a Swedish-speaking minority (5.2% of mainland Finland's population in December 2019) living mostly in the coastal areas of southern, south-western, and western Finland. During the 20th century, the urbanization following the Industrial Revolution has led to large majorities of Finnish speakers in all major cities. The capital Helsinki (in Swedish Helsingfors) became predominantly Finnish-speaking as recently as around 1900. A large and important part of the Swedish-speaking population nevertheless lives in the capital.

The autonomous island province of Åland is an exception, being monolingually Swedish-speaking according to international treaties. It is a matter of definition whether the Swedish dialects spoken on Åland are to be considered a kind of Finland Swedish or not. Most Swedish-speaking Finns and linguists consider them to be closer to some of the dialects spoken in nearby parts of Sweden.

== Official status ==
Swedish is one of the two official and national languages of the Republic of Finland, the other being Finnish. These two languages have formally equal status in nearly all legislation, though the status of Swedish in Finland has long been a subject of sociopolitical debate. The other minority languages (such as Sami) are regulated separately.

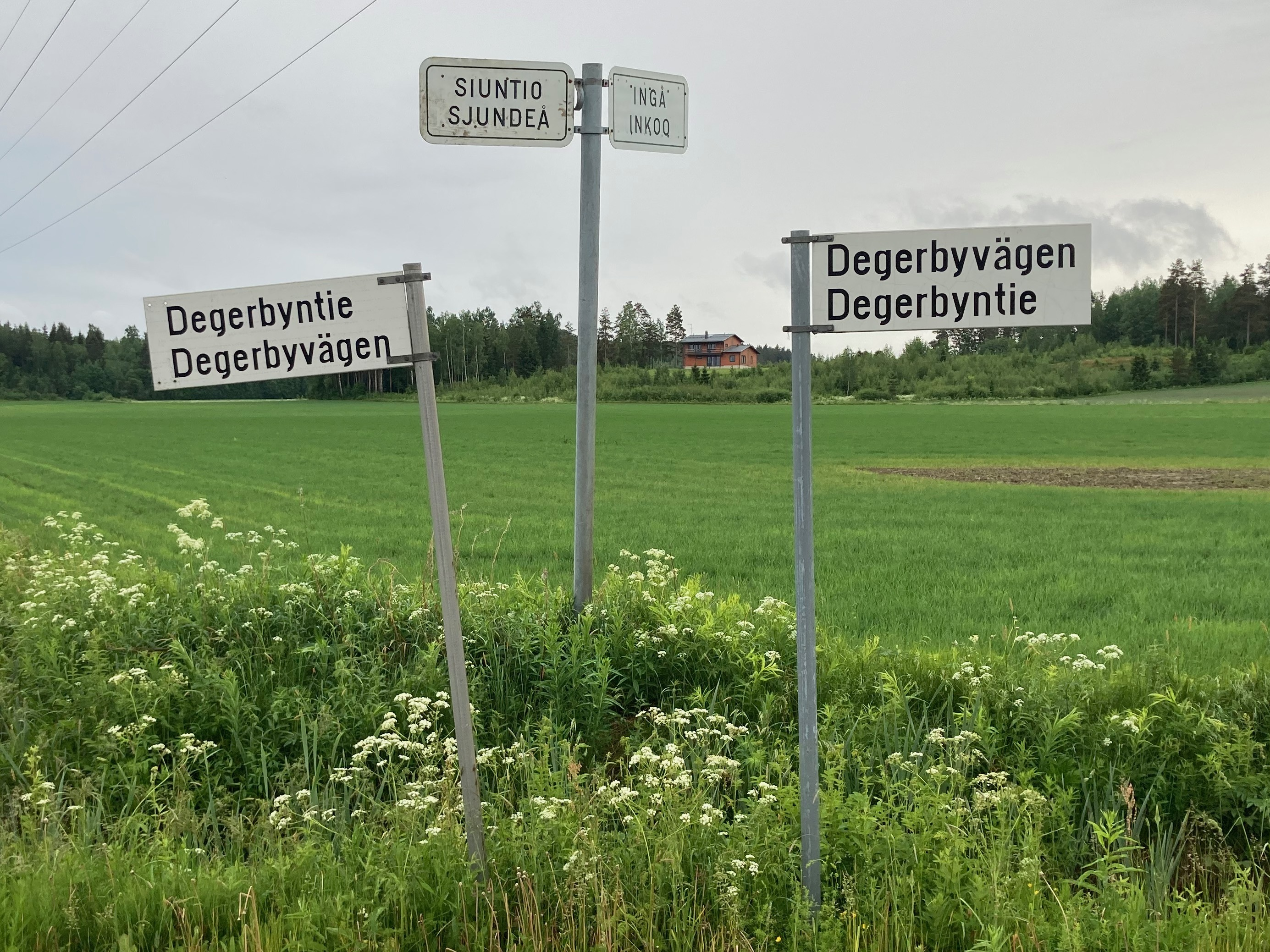
Border between bilingual municipalities of Siuntio and Ingå: traffic signs are both in Finnish and Swedish. In Siuntio, where the majority of people speak Finnish, the signs are written first in Finnish. In Ingå, the majority language is Swedish, which is reflected in the traffic signs being written in Swedish first.

Finland Swedish is regulated by the Institute for the Languages of Finland. Official Swedish is not supposed to be very different from Swedish as found in Sweden. There are however e.g. words regarded as archaic in Sweden, but commonly used in Finland, and terms that differ from their counterparts in Sweden, often because of slight differences in the related legislation.

Bilingualism of municipalities is regulated by the Language Act of 2003. If the minority has increased into at least 3,000 persons or 8% of inhabitants, then the municipality must become bilingual. If the minority has fallen below 3,000 persons and 6% of inhabitants, then the municipality becomes monolingual, unless it decides to keep its bilingual status. At present, only one such municipality has done so, namely Lohja (Lojo in Swedish). The status is reviewed once in a decade, and enacted by a government decree issued by the Finnish Council of State.

The country's public broadcaster, Yle, provides two Swedish-language radio stations, Yle Vega and Yle X3M. The Swedish-language TV channel Yle Fem was merged with Yle Teema in 2017 to form Yle Teema & Fem.

== Phonology ==
Finland Swedish dialects.

With the exception of the dialects spoken in Ostrobothnia along the west coast, close to the Gulf of Bothnia (example: the dialect spoken in Närpes), Finland Swedish is not particularly different from Central Swedish. The phoneme /ʉː/ is more centralized and pronounced like [ʉː], quite similar to how many speakers of English pronounce /uː/ (as in moon). That should be compared to the Central Swedish [ʉ̟ː], which is very close to the short vowel [ʏː] and is more rounded.

The highly variable sj sound /ɧ/ varies between [ʂ] and [ɕ ~ ʃ] on the Finnish mainland, often close to sh in English shoe. In the Åland Islands, its realization is similar to the velar (and often labialized) pronunciations of nearby parts of Sweden. The historic k sound before front vowels and the tj sound, in modern Central Swedish a fricative /ɕ/, is an affricate [t͡ɕ] or [t͡ʃ] in all Finland Swedish dialects, close to ch in English chin, except for some Åland dialects, in which it is a simple fricative [ɕ].

The tonal word accent, which distinguishes some minimal pairs in most dialects of Swedish and Norwegian, is not present in Finland Swedish (except around the parish of Snappertuna, west of Helsinki). Hence, Central Swedish minimal pairs like /ˈandɛn/ ("the duck") and /ǎndɛn/ ("the spirit") are both pronounced [ˈɑndɛn] in Finland.

Finland Swedish lacks the aspirated stops present in Central Standard Swedish, making the contrast between "fortis" and "lenis" stops one of voicing only. The retroflexion that occurs in many dialects when /r/ precedes a coronal consonant does not occur in certain pairs in Finland Swedish (e.g. /rt/, which is realized as [ʈ] in Standard Swedish but [rt] in Finland Swedish).

== Vocabulary ==
Finland Swedish mostly has the same vocabulary as Swedish in Sweden, and there is a conscious effort to adopt neologisms from Sweden, to maintain cohesion between the two varieties. Nevertheless, there are differences, which generally fall into two categories: words now considered archaic in Sweden, and loanwords and calques from Finnish or independently borrowed from other languages (nowadays mostly English). There are also some terms differing because of differing legislation.

== See also ==
- Languages of Finland
- Åland Swedish
- Swedish-speaking Finns
- Estonian Swedish
- Sveticism
- Sweden Swedish
- Mandatory Swedish
