= TVK =

TVK may refer to:

- Confederation of Salaried Employees, a former national trade union centre in Finland
- National Television of Cambodia, codenamed TVK.
- Television Kanagawa
- Television Korea, an American Korean-language TV channel
- TV Klelé, a community television station in Guinea-Bissau
- Southeast Ambrym language
- Tamilaga Vettri Kazhagam, a political party founded by Actor turned politician Vijay in Tamil Nadu, India
- Tamizhaga Vazhvurimai Katchi, an Indian political party
