= Ylen aamu =

Finnish morning TV program

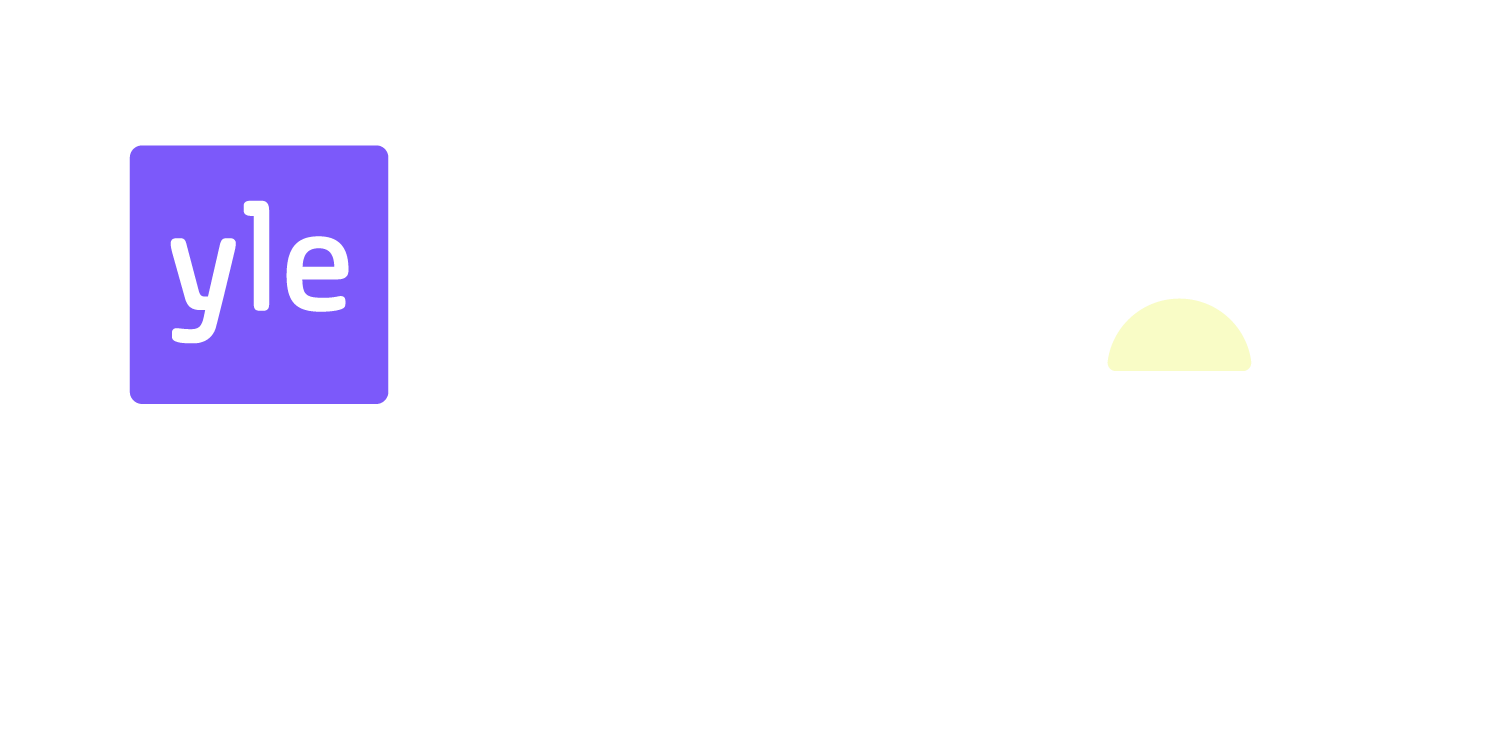
- Genre: Morning show
- Country of origin: Finland
- Original language: Finnish

Original release
- Network: YLE TV1
- Release: 3 March 1997 – present

Ylen aamu (previously Yle aamu-tv, Ylen aamu-tv, Aamu-tv and Ykkösen aamu-tv) is a Finnish TV morning news and magazine programme directed by Annina Enbuske and Erja Ollonen which has been broadcast on Yle TV1 in Finland since 3 March 1997. The programme is relayed outside of Finland by TV Finland, which is available terrestrially in parts of Sweden.

== Hosts ==
- Mikko Haapanen
- Juha Hietanen
- Sari Huovinen
- Anna Lehmusvesi
- Teresa Meriläinen
- Sanna Ukkola
- Nicklas Wancke

=== Former hosts ===
- Heikki Ali-Hokka
- Jan Andersson
- Hilla Blomberg
- Annika Damström
- Kirsi Heikel
- Sari Helin
- Markus Hippi
- Jakke Holvas
- Ari Hursti (Saturday programs)
- Tomi Korhonen
- Katri Makkonen
- Riina Malhotra
- Kati Niemeläinen (ps. Parkkonen)
- Jukka Niva
- Arto Nyberg
- Leena Pakkanen
- Jussi-Pekka Rantanen
- Leo Riski
- Mika Saarelainen
- Marja Sannikka
- Päivi Saharinen (ps. Storgård)
- Heta-Leena Sierilä
- Seppo Toivonen
- Seija Vaaherkumpu (ps. Rautio)
- Katri Viippola
- Anu Vilkman
- Kirsi Virtanen (Saturday programs)
- Matti Virtanen

== Anchors ==
- Tommy Fränti
- Anne-Pauliina Rytkönen
- Tuulia Thynell
- Hanna Visala

== Weather ==
- Joonas Koskela
- Elina Lopperi
- Kerttu Kotakorpi
- Toni Hellinen
- Matti Huutonen
- Seija Paasonen

== Visitors ==
- Pasi Heikura ... himself (4 episodes, 2003–2004)
- Reko Lundán ... himself (4 episodes, 2003–2004)
- Tuomas Enbuske ... himself (4 episodes, 2004)
- Taina West ... herself (3 episodes, 2004–2005)

== See also ==
- TV-nytt
