= SVT World =

- Country: Sweden

Ownership
- Owner: Sveriges Television

History
- Launched: December 1, 1988; 37 years ago
- Closed: 30 April 2017 (9 years ago)
- Former names: TV4 (1988–1996); SVT4 (1996–1997); SVT Europa (1997–2009)

Links
- Website: http://www.svt.se/svtworld/

Availability

Terrestrial
- Southern Finland: Channel 5

SVT World's fifth and previous logo from 2009 to 2012

SVT World was an international television channel from the Swedish broadcaster Sveriges Television. The channel was available on satellite in Europe and much of Africa, Australia and Asia, terrestrially in parts of Finland and worldwide via IPTV.

The broadcasts were mostly made up of the Swedish language programmes from SVT1 and SVT2. If both SVT1 and SVT2 show a programme for which SVT does not have international rights, programmes from SVT24 or Kunskapskanalen are shown. When SVT1 and SVT2 are not broadcasting, SVT24 is shown. Teletext pages from SVT Text were included in the broadcasts. The radio channels Radio Sweden and SR P4 were also included with SVT Europa.

== History ==
The channel launched in 1988 as TV4 broadcasting a mix of SVT1 and SVT2 terrestrially to the Swedish-speaking areas of southern Finland. The channel was later renamed SVT4. It was supposed to start a joint co-operation with Finlands TV to deliver its service to Europe by satellite, but this was rejected during 1997; in addition, the channel chose the Sirius 2 satellite instead of Hot Bird 2 for that, while TV Finland opted for Intelsat 707. On December 10, 1997, the channel started broadcasting from the Sirius 2 satellite to all of Europe and was renamed SVT Europa. Initially, only regular households and hotels in the Nordic countries were allowed to receive the channel, but in 1999, cable networks in Spain were allowed to distribute the channel and in 2000 hotels outside the Nordic countries were allowed to include the channel.

SVT Europa's logo used between 2001-2009

In 2005, SVT Europa started broadcasting on the Thaicom 5 satellite and thereby became available in parts of Africa, Asia, and Australia, although this requires a large satellite dish of about 2–3 metres. The broadcast stopped in April 2016. At a point, SVT Europa moved from Sirius 2 to Eurobird 9.

Analogue terrestrial broadcasts in Finland ceased on 1 September 2007 when Finland switched completely to digital television. On that day, SVT Europa started broadcasting as a digital pay-TV channel there. In September 2011, however, it became a free-to-air channel again, sharing a channel with Yle Fem in southern Finland and the Swedish-speaking Ostrobothnia.

To reflect the fact that the channel is now broadcast in four continents, its name was changed to SVT World in mid-April 2009. With the name change the channel moved its playout centre, which allowed it to broadcast in the widescreen format (instead of the 4:3 letterbox format used until then) and time-shift programmes to be broadcast when it is night-time in Sweden. The channel will also get new graphics. SVT World also started broadcasting Regionala Nyheter (Regional News) throughout the world at 1:40–6:00 am (7:40 am – 1:00 pm), as well as more overnight repeats to cater to different time zones.

In October 2016, it was announced that the channel would be closed on 30 April 2017. The decision was taken because the business was no longer seen as economically viable, as a result of increased competition as well as the impending end of simulcasts of SVT World on Yle Fem in Finland, when it and Yle Teema would eventually merge into a new single channel in April 2017.

== See also ==
- TV Finland
- Scandinavian Channel
