= Svorsk =

Swedish-Norwegian mixed language

- Svorsk
- Language family: Swedish–Norwegian mixed

Language codes
- ISO 639-3: None (mis)
- Glottolog: None

Svorsk (Norwegian: [ˈsvɔʂk]) or Svorska (Swedish: [ˈsvɔ̂ʂːka]) is a portmanteau of svensk(a) 'Swedish' and norsk(a) 'Norwegian' to describe a mixture of the Swedish and Norwegian languages. It could be translated as Sworwegian in English.

The term svorsk is used to describe the language of someone (almost exclusively a Swedish or Norwegian person) who mixes words from their native tongue with the other language. The phenomenon is common, especially in light of the close business and trade ties between the two countries and the mutual intelligibility between the two languages, the latter in its turn being due to the common ancestry and parallel development of both Norwegian and Swedish from Old Norse (see North Germanic languages). The term originates from the 1970s.

Individual Swedish loanwords and phrases that are assimilated into a language, including Norwegian, are called svecisms (svesismer). This trend has been ongoing in Norwegian since the dissolution of the Dano-Norwegian Union in 1814; however, it gained momentum substantially after the dissolution of the union between Norway and Sweden in 1905 and has been an ongoing phenomenon of Norwegian linguistics, and still is. Indeed, the prominent Norwegian linguist Finn-Erik Vinje characterizes this influx since World War II as a breaking wave.

There's no one specific vocabulary used in Svorsk; versions range from borderline joke speech (replacing random vowels in the person's main language) to knowing and using a reasonable set of core words from the other language (such as lita, ursäkta, and kolla from Swedish; and for example hengsler, pils, and potet from Norwegian, among countless others).

== See also ==
- Russenorsk
- Portuñol
- Surzhyk
- Trasianka
