= TV ARSA =

== TV ARSA Variety Show ==
General Information
Format: Variety Show
Created by: "Nithi Smudkochorn" and "Suchart Smudkochorn"
Developed by: The Firm Entertainment Co., Ltd.
Starring by: "Nithi Smudkochorn" and "Krek Chiller"
Country of origin: Thailand
Language(s): Thai

Production
Executive producers: "Chusak Taekitjumroon" and "Parinya Lerdupatum"
Camera setup: Multi-camera
Running time: 60 minutes

Broadcast
Original channel: Thai Independent Television (TITV)
Timing: Saturdays, 4 - 5 p.m.

== Contents / Breaks ==
TV ARSA (Thai: ทีวีอาสา) is a Thai variety show produced by The Firm Entertainment Co., Ltd. Its goal is to seek for any kind of problems happening in Thailand and help solving them in a creative way. "TV ARSA" slogan is "No matter how small or big the problem is, we're there to help you out". There are three main contents or breaks; (1) ARSA PR, (2) DARA ARSA, and (3) ARSA HERO.

Break 1: ARSA PR (Thai: อาสาโฆษณาให้)
The first break briefly promotes a person's life and his/her work by focusing on the creativity of his/her job, such as family-made products, new Thai brands, and other interesting ideas of doing business and making things happen. The aspect of this break is to inspire Thai people to create their own unique businesses or develop fresh ideas in their working environment.

Break 2: DARA ARSA (Thai: ดาราอาสา)
The second break usually represents in the form of VTR (Video Tape Recording) outdoor activities and social works, helping Thai people to deal with their problems in a creative way. The content in this break is light, fun, and interesting because it is mainly hosted by a group of celebrities, including actors, actresses, singers, and other volunteers.

Break 3: ARSA HERO (Thai: คนอาสา)
The last break promotes the program's 'Hero' of the week. "TV ARSA" rewards a person or a group of people with an outstanding social work background. This person might not be famous like a superstar or publicly well-known but he/she is a great 'Hero' in the heart of Thai people.
