= Scandinavian Channel =

Defunct cable television network

- Country: United States

Ownership
- Owner: Scandinavian Channel, Inc.

History
- Launched: October 15, 1999; 26 years ago
- Closed: May 1, 2001; 25 years ago

Scandinavian Channel (also known as ScanChan) was an American short-lived cable television network delivering programs from the public broadcasters of Iceland, Norway, Denmark, Sweden and Finland, targeting primarily Americans of Scandinavian descent. Founded in 1998 with broadcasts starting the following year, the low penetration of digital cable caused the channel to go bankrupt due to lack of subscribers in 2001.

At closing time, 50 cable networks carried the service.

== History ==
Before its creation, a half-hour program of the same name aired on The International Channel for half an hour every day since around 1996, with footage compiled from Scandinavian public networks and with grants from Scandinavian governments

The channel was first planned in 1998 by Norwegian-American businessman Steinar Hubertson, eyeing a fall 1999 launch date. The project was being financed with private money, as well as an investment from Telenor. By late 1998, Trygve Myhren, also of Norwegian descent, began his involvement with the channel. As of December 1999, his role was non-executive.

In March 1999, five Scandinavian broadcasters (RÚV, NRK, DR, SVT and Yle) were in their final negotiating stages with Scandinavian Channel, which was initially set to launch in September, tentatively priced at $8. At the time, International Channel carried a one-hour slot of Scandinavian programming produced by Scandinavian Channel, as well as providing thirteen hours of programming to PBS.

On October 15, 1999, the channel started broadcasting, exclusively on Comcast head-ends. Negotiations were underway with AT&T, MediaOne and Time Warner Cable. It was priced at $9.95, due to the result of surveys held in its planning stages. The channel's website also launched in tandem with the channel. The channel aimed at cities with sizeable populations of people of Scandinavian descent, but also had plans to reach out to rural areas (where the Scandinavian population was higher), by negotiating with DirecTV and Dish Network. The channel's break-even point was relatively low, which company executives expected that it would surpass if it gained 30 to 40,000 subscribers. Distribution of the channel was handled by International Channel Networks. The channel also had an accompanying website featuring information about Scandinavia and its culture.

In October 2000, Scandinavian Channel inked a distribution agreement with the National Cable TV Cooperative.

On March 1, 2001, the channel's extant logo (featuring elements of the flags of the five countries present in its programming) was replaced by a new, more flexible one, evocative of a butterfly or a flower.

The channel closed at 12pm on May 1, 2001, due to the slow implementation of digital cable, which led to disappointing subscription figures, which a Norwegian newspaper estimated to be of 500. As a result of these factors, Telenor lost NOK 20 million.

The channel also planned to launch in Canada and requested submission to CRTC on July 13, 2001, two months after its closure; the CRTC requested to remove the channel from digital lists in 2005.

== Programming ==
The channel targeted first-generation Scandinavian immigrants and Scandinavians working or studying in the United States. It ran on a six-hour wheel and was compiled in Boulder, where its facilities were located. No live news programs were broadcast; instead, the channel aired a compilation of news items sourced from the participating Scandinavian broadcasters (as Scandinavian News). This hour-long bulletin opened the wheel. The member broadcasters sent their programming at a very low cost.

Ahead of launch, some of its content was never before seen on American television in general, such as documentaries on churches built without nails in the 11th century, a Norwegian cooking show and a social experiment (Our Life on the Land) in which a family traded their urban life for a farm life.

== Carriage ==
Throughout its existence, Scandinavian Channel had a limited carriage.

On May 10, 2000, the channel was added to Adelphia's digital system in Colorado Springs. Thanks to the October 2000 NCTC deal, the channel was eligible to join up to 950 systems, with high preferrence in Minnesota, North Dakota, Kansas, Iowa and Wisconsin, where more people with Scandinavian heritage were found. The first NCTC system to sign up was Sjöberg's Cable in Thief River Falls, MN. In December 2000, it signed deals with Adelphia and Cox's systems in southern California.

== See also ==
- SVT World
- TV Finland
