= TITV Everest 2007 =

- Also known as: TITV Everest: The Unlimited Spirit of Thailand 2007
- Country of origin: Thailand

Original release
- Network: TITV

TITV Everest: The Unlimited Spirit of Thailand 2007 is a Thai reality television series on TITV that follows the adventure of nine Thai people seeking to be the first Thai expedition to reach the summit of Mount Everest. The team had planned to place the Thai flag, a Buddhist pennant and the emblem of King Bhumibol Adulyadej on the summit to mark the king's 80th birthday.

The team had hoped to reach the summit by November 8, but they were forced to abandon their expedition because of harsh weather conditions.

== Premise ==
Broadcast on TITV, the reality series follows nine people from Thailand who are climbing the world's highest peak, Mount Everest.

The team has opted to climb Everest on a route from Nepal. The nine climbers, aged between 27 and 48, were chosen from applicants nationwide.

The team, officially named Unlimited Spirit of Thailand 2007, is headed by Pinyo Rungroung, a 27-year-old officer in the Royal Thai Navy. Wanpen Sinthuvong, 40, information center manager for TITV, is the only woman on the team. The team also included three other TITV staff members, and two other members of the Navy, as well as two individuals.

The team is backed by 27 professional climbers and 170 Sherpas who will carry its eight tons of equipment.

To ascend the peak, only the strongest five of the nine-member team will be selected.

The team had hoped to reach the summit and plant their flags by November 8. However, after reaching 8,500 metes, the team had to turn back due to bad weather and fatigue.

"The safety of our members is our first concern," the Thai Embassy in Kathmandu said in a statement on November 13. "The team is now coming down and are likely to reach Kathmandu Wednesday."

== Team members ==
- Anukoon Sorn-ek
- Anusak Jonyindee
- Dilok Tamjaipuan
- Kitti Chancharoen
- Pirat Pinengam
- Pinyo Rungroung (team leader)
- Theppabut Kimjun
- Suthon Yimdee
- Wanpen Sinthuvong

== See also ==
- Everest Vietnam
