= NRK Sápmi =

Sami-language broadcasting service from Norway

Coordinates: 69°28′30″N 25°30′51″E

- Nationally available; Norway
- Broadcast area: Norway
- Frequencies: NRK DAB+ national multiplex RiksTV: Channel 210; Allente Norway: Channel 195

Programming
- Languages: Northern Sami; Southern Sami; Lule Sami; Prev. Norwegian Bokmål (Short daily newscast, cancelled in 2015)
- Network: NRK

Ownership
- Owner: NRK

History
- Founded: 1946 (original); 1999 (as a standalone radio station)
- Former frequencies: 93.8 MHz (Kautokeino); 94.7 MHz (Karasjok); 87.6 MHz (Tromsø); 100.0 MHz (Oslo); 95.8 MHz (Tana); 92.1 MHz (Kåfjord); 90.7 MHz (Tysfjord); 96.6 MHz (Snåsa)

Links
- Webcast: https://radio.nrk.no/direkte/sapmi

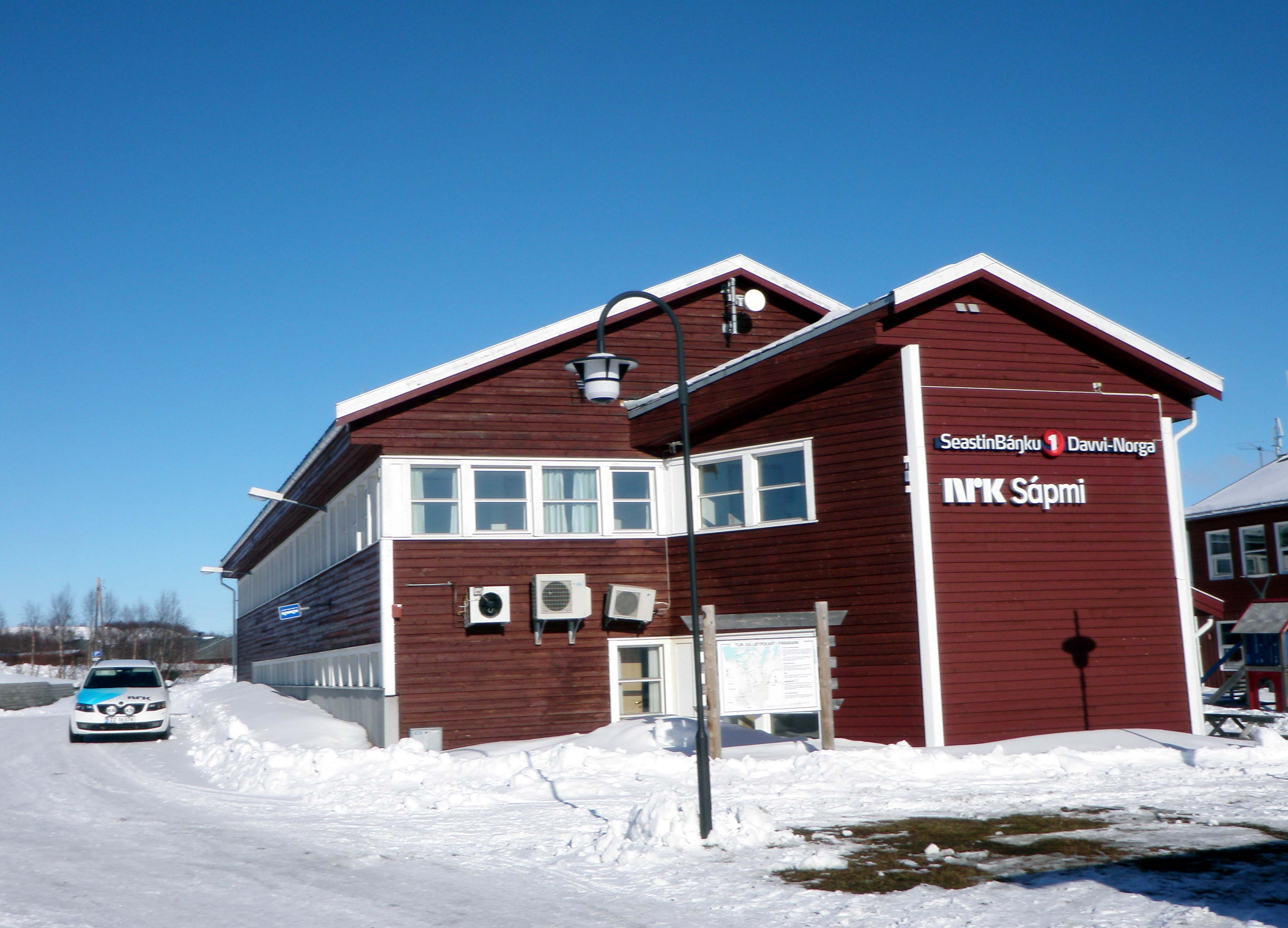
NRK Sápmi's Guovdageaidnu (Kautokeino) office

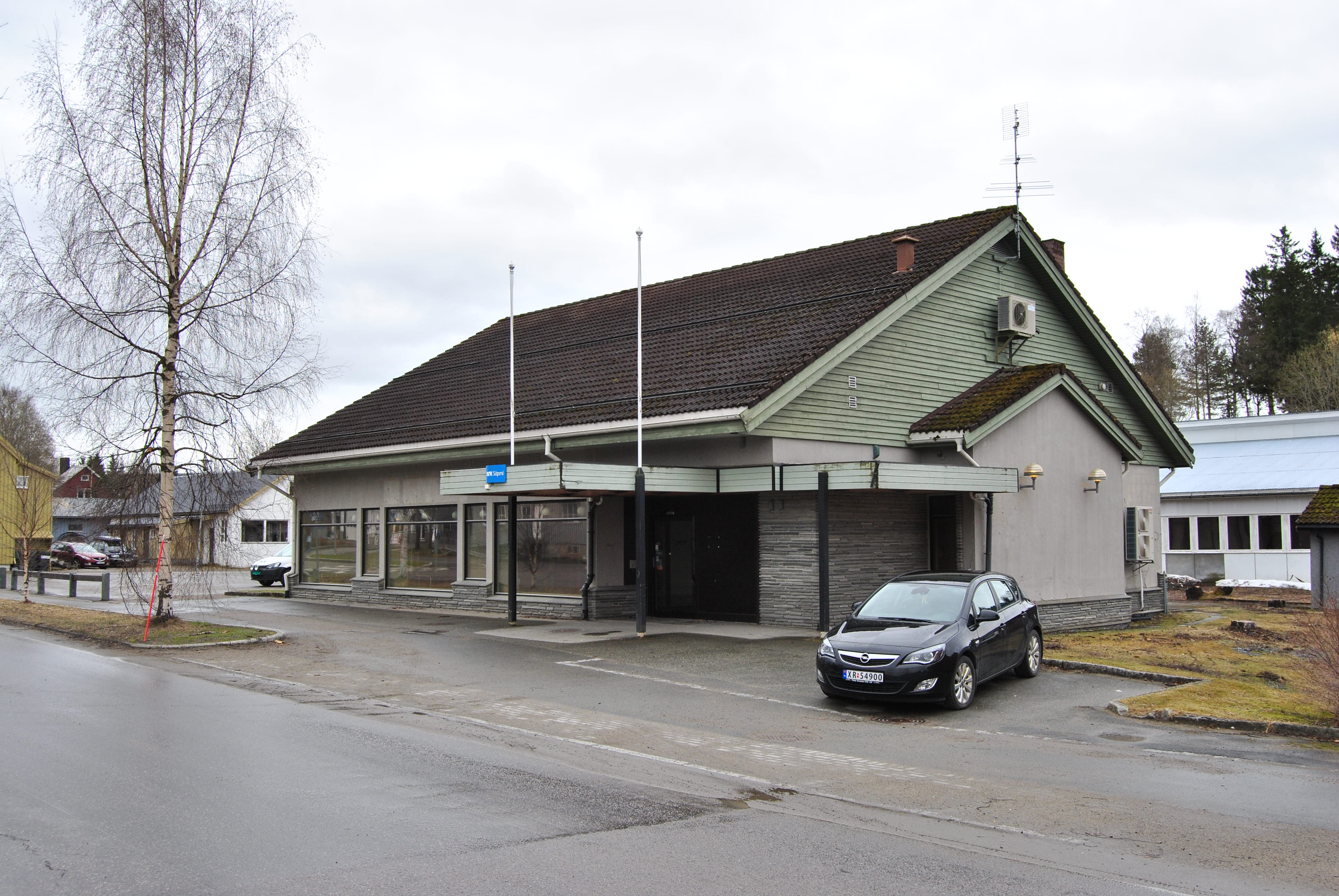
NRK Sápmi's Snåsa office

NRK Sápmi (previously, and with the radio station often still referred to as NRK Sámi Radio) is a unit of the Norwegian Broadcasting Corporation (NRK) that streams news and other programs in the Sámi languages for broadcast to the Sami people of Norway via radio, television, and internet.

NRK Sápmi has about 17 journalists based in Deatnu (Tana), Guovdageaidnu (Kautokeino), Olmmaivaggi in Gáivuotna, Tromsø, Tjeldsund, Hamarøy, Snåsa, and Oslo. Approximately 60 people are employed at the unit's headquarters.

The radio station is available nationwide on DAB and was broadcast on FM radio in Finnmark County and in the cities of Oslo and Tromsø before Norway's shutdown of national and major regional FM stations.

The station is also available on DAB in the general Longyearbyen area of Svalbard and in the radio sections on some digital TV providers. Due to distance limitations with DAB+ technology, signal spillovers into neighbouring countries are very small; according to official Norwegian signal charts, spillover villages supposedly include Utsjoki, Karigasniemi, Nikel, Gäddede, Storlien, Charlottenberg, and Strömstad.

== History ==
Regular radio news programs in Sami began in 1946, presented from Tromsø by the teacher Kathrine Johnsen (1917–2002), remembered today as "Sami Radio's Mother".

In 1976, NRK Sámi Radio moved to Kárášjohka (Karasjok) and in 1984 to its current headquarters (also in Kárášjohka).

== Podcasts ==
In 2018, NRK first began production on online podcasts in three of Norway's Sámi languages, including Sámi Horror and Hævvi.

== TV productions ==
NRK Sápmi does not have a standalone TV channel. Instead, it produces content for NRK's three main TV channels (excluding NRK Tegnspråk). The exact amount of content varies but averages around 40 minutes daily across all channels combined.

- Ođđasat: All-Sápmi 15-minute Northern Sami newscast on NRK1 and NRK Sámi Radio on weekdays, also aired in Sweden and Finland.
- Mánáid-TV: Kids slot on NRK Super (originally on NRK1) with original productions in Northern Sami and Southern Sami and a select few imported cartoons dubbed in Northern Sami (e.g. Moominvalley, Cornel & Bernie, and previously The Amazing World of Gumball).
- Binnábannaš: Originally designed for NRK Super as a Sami counterpart to the Norwegian-speaking preschool character Fantorangen, the show became a showpiece for Sami languages, with narrated versions in 5 Sami languages.
- Pulk: Mature surrealist live-action comedy show about mental clinic patients, originally aired on NRK3.
- Studio Sápmi: Cultural talk show on NRK1.
- Sámi Grand Prix: Loosely modelled on Melodi Grand Prix but with multiple contest categories. Does not grant spots in the Eurovision Song Contest.
- Melkeveien: Produced a Northern Sami-narrated version of the originally Norwegian-language show. Originally, the Sami version would air its episodes on NRK2 on a 3-day delay after the Norwegian-language version, as alternate digital audio tracks were not (and still aren't as of November 2023) used on NRK channels.

== See also ==
- Sameradion, Sámi-language broadcasting from Sweden
- Yle Sámi Radio, Sámi-language broadcasting from Finland
- APTN
- BBC Alba
- Māori Television
- NITV
- PTS
- TG4
- S4C
- SABC
- Te Reo (TV)
- TITV
- TRT Kurdî
- WITBN
