= World Indigenous Television Broadcasters Network =

Confederation of broadcasting organisations

- Formation: March 2008
- Type: Union of broadcasting organisations
- Website: wibn.global

The World Indigenous Television Broadcasters Network (WITBN) is a confederation of indigenous broadcasting organisations from countries serving indigenous and minority language populations. Members are radio and television companies, most of which are government-owned public service broadcasters or privately owned stations with public missions.

== Members ==
- Australia: NITV
- Canada:
  - APTN
  - Isuma
- Finland: Yle Sámi Radio
- Ireland: TG4
- New Zealand:
  - Te Reo
  - Whakaata Māori
- Norway: NRK Sápmi
- Paraguay: Paraguay TV
- Sweden:
  - SR Sápmi
  - SVT Sápmi
- Taiwan:
  - PTS
  - Hakka TV
  - TITV
- Thailand: Thai PBS
- United Kingdom:
  - BBC Alba
  - S4C
- United States:
  - FNX
  - ´'Ōiwi TV
  - Pacific Islanders in Communications (PIC)
