= Operaatio Hurrikaani =

Finnish children's television series

Operaatio Hurrikaani (Operation Hurricane) is an interactive combination of a television show and a website that has been produced by YLE (Finnish Broadcasting Company). It aired on Yle TV2 from 2006 to 2010. Its anticipated target audience is 7–12 year olds.

== Plot ==
Puuma (Puma) is a young individual who leads a double life; everybody thinks he is studying to become a teacher, but he is a top secret agent. He has to fight against Tohtori Routa (Dr. Freeze) and his evil plans. Puuma gets help from his curious aunt Sirkku, from an older agent Postimies and from a beautiful and hardworking girl agent Kleopatra.

== How it works ==
Each week the TV-show has a drama episode, which ends with a question and three alternatives.

After that kids can log on to the website and help Puuma by giving their answer. Doing so they earn themselves a new mini-game, which they can use to train their skills as a secret agent. They also have an avatar, which can be modified by changing clothes, hair styles and spy gear.

Then on the TV-show at the following week, the correct answer for the question is shown.

There is a prize draw for all participating agents. The winners are shown as the avatars they have created online in the weekly TV show.

== Cast ==
- Tomi Alatalo as Puuma "Puma"
- Iina Suominen as Sirkku
- Olli Löytönen as Postimies "Postman"
- Hanna Salo as Kleopatra
- Maria Isotalo as Aleksandra
- Olli Mononen as Routa "Dr. Freeze"

== Seasons ==
- 1st season, episodes 1–20, aired 2007
- 2nd season, episodes 21–40, aired 2008
- 3rd season, episodes 41–50, aired 2009
- 4th season, episodes 51–70, aired 2009–2010
