= Arto Nyberg =

Finnish journalist

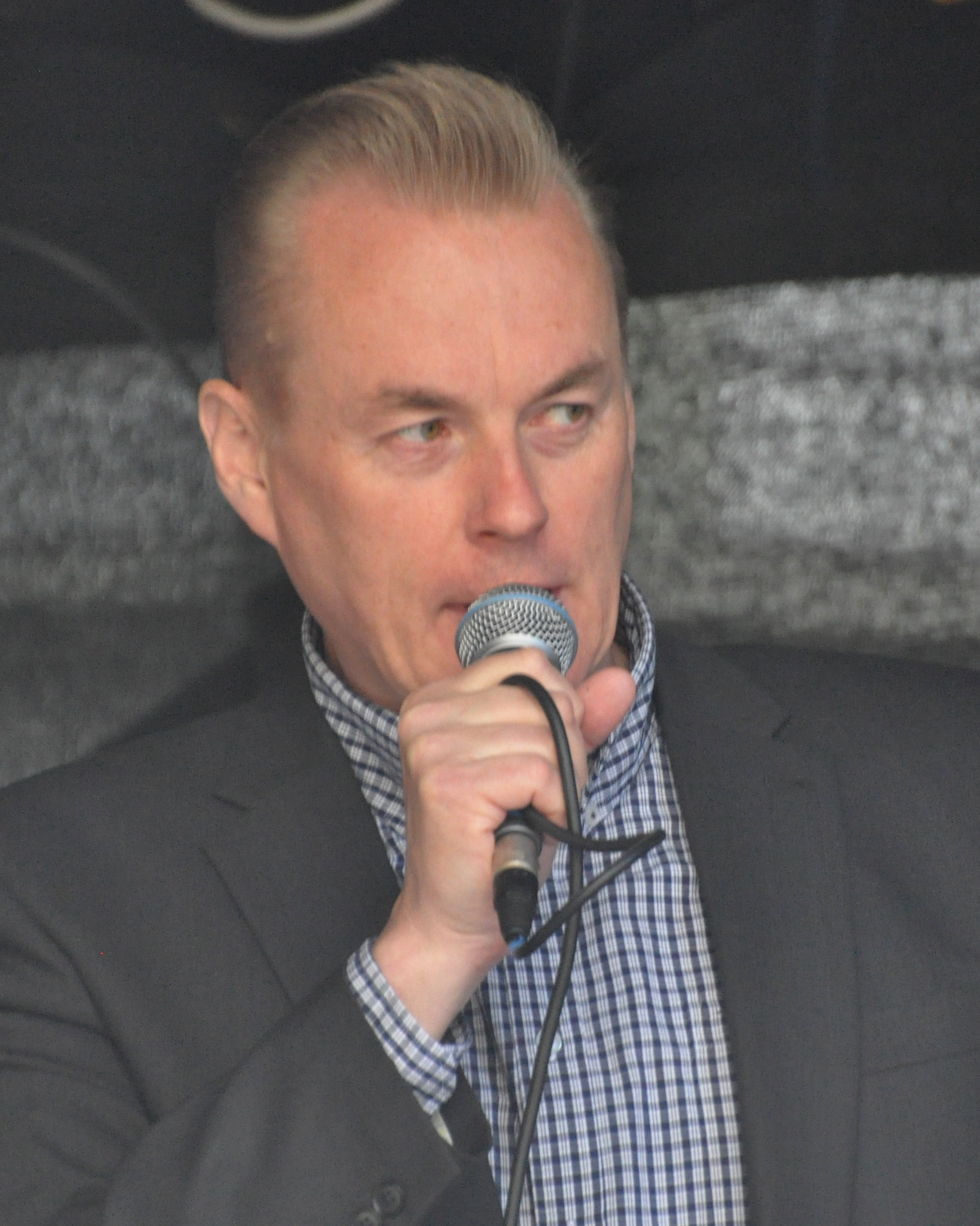
Arto Nyberg (2011)

Arto Kalevi Nyberg (born 28 May 1966, Viiala) is a Finnish journalist worked for Yleisradio. He hosted his own talk show called Arto Nyberg. Before getting his own show, Nyberg worked as a journalist and host on the Finnish morning television programme Aamu-TV.

For two years in a row (in 2006 and 2007), Nyberg received the Venla award for best TV performer.

Nyberg plays music in the band Nyrok Dolls, plays football and enjoys English beer. He is married to reporter Sara Nyberg and has a son named Max (born 2003).

== Books ==
- Ylänne, Kari; Nyberg, Arto (2005). Lontoon pubit: 100 parasta!. Heinäpään viestintä (yhtiö). Vantaa: Heinäpään viestintä. ISBN 978-952-99213-4-8.
- Tähkä, Lauri; Askola, Irja; Vuorinen, Juha; Laaksonen, Heli; Stubb, Alexander; Koivuniemi, Paula; Nikula, Jone; Närhi, Laura; Nyberg, Arto (2011). Eläköön lapsi! satuja tähtien lukemana. 2. Helsinki: Pelastakaa lapset : Otava : Suomalainen kirjakauppa. ISBN 978-951-1-25903-9.
