= Popcorn Zen =

Popcorn Zen was a weekly showcase program that airs on AZN Television. The series debuted in 2005. The show was hosted by an American radio deejay, Eugene Lee.

Popcorn Zen featured film shorts, stories and interviews from Asian-American film makers and directors, including those from various Asian countries. Because of the content of most of these features, the series carries a "TV-MA" rating, even though it airs in various timeslots, including late afternoons and before primetime.
