= TV Finland =

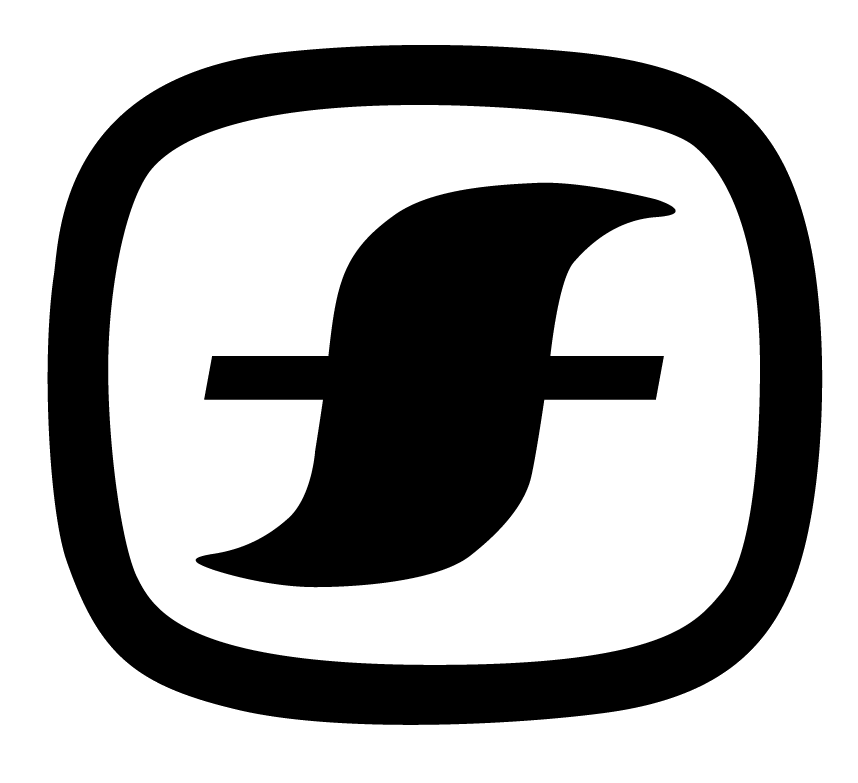
- Broadcast area: Sweden

Programming
- Languages: Finnish; Swedish
- Picture format: 16:9 576i (SDTV)

Ownership
- Owner: Yle

History
- Launched: 1986
- Closed: June 30, 2013 (via satellite)
- Former names: Finlands TV (FTV) (1986-1997)

TV Finland is a Finnish free-to-air television channel broadcasting in Sweden. It was originally created broadcast in that country as part of a reciprocal agreement between the Finnish and Swedish governments that also established SVT Europa (originally named TV4 in Finland) broadcasts in areas of Finland with Swedish-speaking populations.

TV Finland is operated by Finland's national broadcaster Yle, and its content is taken from programs regularly broadcast on state channels Yle TV1, Yle TV2 and Swedish language Yle Fem.

Most of its programming consists of locally made productions and national sports events, and does not include commercials (any commercial breaks or gaps between consecutive programs are filled with on-screen stills). It includes the Yle teletext service.

On EPGs, Swedish titles are used to refer to programmes regardless of their original/main language.

== See also ==
- List of television channels in Finland
- Scandinavian Channel
