= Languages of Åland =

- Official: Swedish
- Minority: Finnish
- Foreign: English

The Åland province of Finland, highlighted in red

Åland, an autonomous region of Finland, has the largest Swedish-speaking majority in Finland, with about 88% of the province, or about 25,500 people, speaking Swedish as their first language (specifically the Åland Swedish dialect). Swedish is also the sole official language of the province. Finnish also has a presence, although it is small; only about 5% of Ålanders are Finnish-speaking.

Mother tongue
| Mother tongue | 2000 | | 2010 | | 2020 | |
| Mother tongue | Number | % | Number | % | Number | % |
|---|---|---|---|---|---|---|
| Swedish | 24,169 | 93.77% | 25,173 | 89.88% | 25,986 | 86.25% |
| Finnish | 1,238 | 4.8% | 1,373 | 4.9% | 1,405 | 4.66% |
| Romanian | 2 | 0.01% | 166 | 0.59% | 501 | 1.66% |
| Latvian | 5 | 0.02% | 195 | 0.7% | 443 | 1.47% |
| Estonian | 23 | 0.09% | 138 | 0.49% | 206 | 0.68% |
| English | 69 | 0.27% | 97 | 0.35% | 164 | 0.54% |
| Norwegian | 36 | 0.14% | 34 | 0.12% | 41 | 0.14% |
| Other | 234 | 0.91% | 831 | 2.97% | 1,424 | 4.73% |

There are 59 spoken native languages in 2020 (with a total population of 29,884):

- Swedish: 25,986
- Finnish: 1,405
- Romanian: 520
- Latvian: 443
- Estonian: 206
- English: 160
- Thai: 159
- Russian: 158
- German: 115
- Arabic: 107
- Tagalog: 81
- Serbo-Croatian: 79
- Polish: 69
- Farsi: 55
- Spanish: 55
- Ukrainian: 53
- Albanian: 45
- Kurdish: 45
- Norwegian: 42
- Portuguese: 32
- Lithuanian: 31
- Vietnamese: 27
- Italian: 22
- Hindi: 19
- Danish: 17
- Chinese: 15
- Turkish: 15
- Bulgarian: 11
- Dutch: 11
- French: 10
- Greek: 10
- Malayalam: 10
- Icelandic: 9
- Slovak: 8
- Swahili: 8
- Urdu: 6
- Kinyarwanda: 6
- Faroese: 5
- Indonesian: 4
- Catalan: 4
- Macedonian: 4
- Azerbaijani: 3
- Luganda: 3
- Kikuyu: 2
- Nepali: 2
- Amharic: 1
- Armenian: 1
- Burmese: 1
- Hausa: 1
- Ido: 1
- Igbo: 1
- Lingala: 1
- Malay: 1
- Maltese: 1
- Tamil: 1
- Tatar: 1
- Czech: 1
- Others: 11

While the number of Swedish-speakers grew from 24,169 in 2000 to 25,862 in 2019, their percentage has dropped from 93.7% in 2000 to 86.5% in 2019. For Finnish, the percentage and number of speakers has been about same (from 1,238 to 1,401; from 4.8% to 4.7%). The percentage of speakers of other languages grew from 1.5% in 2000 to 8.8% in 2019.
