= Popjapan.tv =

popjapan.tv
- No. of episodes: 35

Production
- Producer: Sony Music Entertainment

Original release
- Network: AZN Television
- Release: 2004 – 2005

popjapan.tv is a J-pop music television program which aired on International Channel (later AZN Television) in the United States from 2004 to 2005, and was syndicated on numerous regional television channels in East Asia, Southeast Asia, North America, and Australia. Each installment of popjapan.tv features music videos, live performances, and/or interviews with a J-pop band or singer from a Sony Music Entertainment record label. An eponymous compilation album was also produced in 2004, featuring 14 singles from the program.

== Featured artists ==
The format of the show included music videos and interviews of various artists. One of the artists is listed as a Featured Artist. Some artists give interviews over multiple episodes.

Featured artists include:

- Crystal Kay – Ep. 27
- Hirakawachi Icchoume – Ep. 29
- hyde – Ep. 2
- The Gospellers – Ep. 31
- Mika Nakashima – Ep. 4, 35
- Nami Tamaki* Orange Range – Ep. 32
- Skoop On Somebody – Ep. 1, 5, 30
- Soul'd Out – Ep. 28, 34
- Sowelu – Ep. 33
- ZONE – Ep. 3
- Home Made Kazoku
- L'Arc-en-Ciel
