= Kathrine Johnsen =

Norwegian Sami broadcaster

- Born: October 22, 1917; Tana, Norway
- Died: June 25, 2002 (aged 84); Tromsø, Norway
- Occupation: Radio journalist
- Known for: The Mother of Sámi Radio

Kathrine Johnsen (22 October 1917–25 June 2002) was a Norwegian Sámi teacher who worked for the public broadcasting service NRK Sápmi. She is a pivotal figure in the promotion and support of Sámi languages and culture in the post-World War II period and has been referred to as "the Mother of the Sámi Radio".

== Early life ==
Johnsen was born in Tana Municipality, to fisherman Ole Johnsen and Ellen Persen, and she grew up in Finnmark county. As a child, she helped her godfather herd reindeer in the summer. After completing secondary school, she worked at a boarding school and later a hotel. During World War II, she experienced German bombing raids on East Finnmark in 1940 and Allied bombing of the German battleship Tirpitz in 1944.

== The Mother of Sámi Radio ==
After the war, Johnsen trained as a teacher in Tromsø where she and Edel Hætta Eriksen began producing Sámi-language radio broadcasts. In 1949, she began working at the Sámi secondary school in Kárášjohka, before being hired as a journalist at the Norwegian public broadcasting service NRK.

Because of official Norwegianization policies, NRK did not invest in Sámi-language broadcasts and for nearly a decade, Johnsen was NRK's only Sámi-language journalist. Despite in the mid-1960s, greater cooperation among Scandinavian broadcasters led to NRK's Sámi broadcasts from Tromsø airing in Sámi areas of northern Sweden and Finland. Johnsen's prominence on these broadcasts helped earn her the nickname "the Mother of Sámi Radio."

Over time, NRK Sámi Radio gained more support, including its own broadcasting house in Kárášjohka in 1976. Johnsen worked for NRK until 1987, both as a journalist and, at some points, as head of the Sámi service. For her work, Johnsen was awarded the NRK Sukkerbiten honor in 1981, as well as the Gold King's Medal of Merit in 1983. In 2011, Tanu named the street near the Tanabru Municipal Center and the local NRK Sápmi office "Kathrine Johnsen Geaidnu" (Kathrine Johnsen Way) in her honor.

== Other activism ==
Johnsen was active in many forms of Sámi political work during her life, especially in the Saami Council. She was an observer for the Norwegian Women's National Council at the United Nations's 31st General Assembly in 1976. She served on many boards, including the newspaper Ságat, where she was chair, and the Nordic Sámi Institute, where she was a deputy member. In addition, she was a member of the Sámi Church Council's liturgy and hymn committees. She is represented in the Norsk salmebok 2013 hymnal with a translation of Thorbjørn Egner's "Jeg folder mine hender små" (I Fold My Hands Small) into Northern Sámi.
