= Åland dialects =

Swedish dialects spoken in Åland, Finland

Åland Swedish
- Region: Åland
- Ethnicity: Fennoswedes
- Language family: Indo-European: Germanic; North Germanic; East Scandinavian; Swedish; East Swedish; Finland Swedish; Åland Swedish

Language codes
- ISO 639-3: –
- Glottolog: alan1247
- IETF: sv-AX

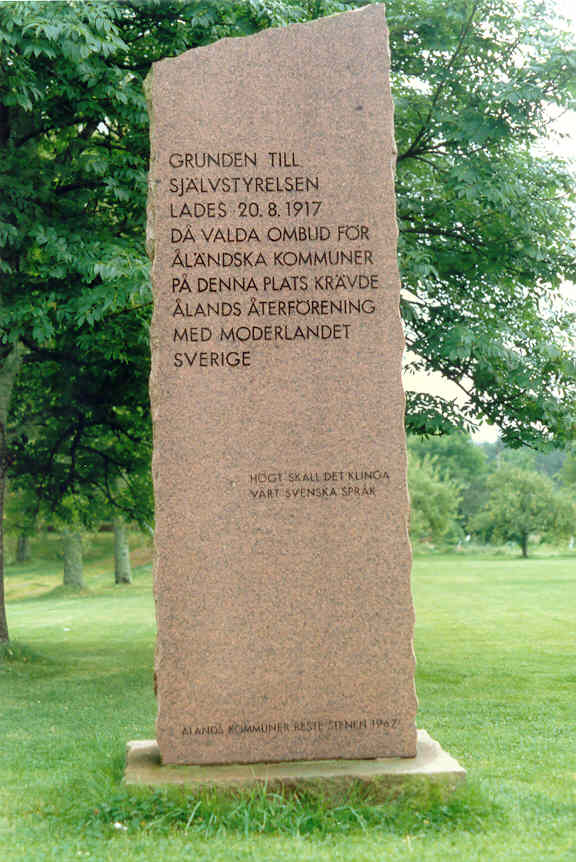
Commemorative stone of Åland's autonomy. The small text reads: Högt skall det klinga vårt svenska språk – Loudly shall it sound, our Swedish language.

Åland dialects (Swedish: åländska) are dialects of Swedish spoken in Åland, an autonomous region of Finland. The Åland dialects have similarities to both Finland Swedish and the historical dialects of Uppland, but are generally considered to be part of Eastern Swedish (östsvenska mål, varieties of Swedish spoken in Finland and Estonia).

Swedish is the sole official language of Åland, and its status is protected in the självstyrelselag, a law that guarantees the islands' autonomy within Finland.

== Phonology ==
As in Finland Swedish, the tonal word accent that distinguishes certain minimal pairs is not present in Åland. Thus Central Swedish [ˈǎnːdɛn] ('the duck') and [ˈânːdɛn] ('the spirit') are both pronounced [ˈanːdɛn].

== Characteristics ==
Certain expressions are typical of Åland dialects. For example, the double genitive in Vemses flicka/pojke är du då? ("Whose's girl/boy are you?" (Vems flicka/pojke är du då in Standard Swedish)) carries the implication that the asker might know the parents of the person asked, likely in a small society such as Åland. Another characteristic is the substitution of inte (not) with inga (no, nobody, none; in Standard Swedish a plural form): Jag har inga varit där ("I have not been there").

A feature that Åland shares with Finland Swedish is the reduction of the words inte (not), skulle (should) and måste (must) to int, sku and måst respectively.

== Vocabulary ==
The dialectal vocabulary of Åland Swedish is composed of words that are either characteristic of Eastern Swedish or have passed out of use (but are still understood) in the Swedish spoken in Sweden. Traces of Finnish, Russian and English can also be found in the dialect because of historical contact.

Below is a selection of dialectal words and expressions used in Åland Swedish:

Åland Swedish	Standard Swedish	Translation	Notes
batting n.	(trä)regel	batten	batting in standard Swedish means baby. Probably from English batten.
batteri n.	(värme)element	radiator	batteri in standard Swedish means battery.
butka n.	fängelse	jail	From Russian будка (cf. Finnish putka)
byka v.	tvätta (kläder)	wash clothes	From byk, laundry. Byk is archaic in Sweden (cf. Finnish pyykki).
bykmaskin n.	tvättmaskin	washing machine	See above
egnahemshus n.	villa	(detached) house	A semantic loan from Finnish omakotitalo, 'own home house'
jo interj.	ja	yeah	Variant form in Sweden, an affirmative answer to a negative question or statement, cf. French si
julgubbe n.	jultomte	Santa Claus	
jåla v.	tramsa, prata strunt	fool around, talk rubbish	
nojsa v.	bråka, tjata, föra oväsen	kick up a fuss, nag, make a noise	Archaic in Sweden. From English noise
Nåssådå! exp.	—	—	Consoling expression used when something does not go as expected
si v.	se	see	Åland Swedish pronunciation of se (see Swedish phonology)
Siddu barra! exp.	lit. Ser du bara, i.e. Ser man på	Just watch	
småkusin n.	syssling	second cousin	Possibly a semantic loan from Finnish pikkuserkku, 'small cousin'
stöpsel n.	stickpropp	electric plug	From Russian штепсель (shtepsel), ultimately from German Stöpsel ('cork')
tövla v.	vara klumpig, fumlig	be clumsy, fumbling	
vilig adj.	riktigt bra	very good, awesome	
ämbar n.	hink	bucket	Archaic in Sweden. Word borrowed from Low German, derived from Latin amphora.

== Differences between dialects in Western and Eastern Åland ==
The Western Åland dialect is characterized by its connection to the dialects of eastern Uppland (Roslagen). This applies especially to the municipality of Eckerö. There are several similarities between Eckerö's and Roslagen's dialects, including the initial h-drop whereby, for example, hus, hitta, and halm are pronounced as "us", "itta", and "alm" and an h sound is atypically inserted before the words ösa and eta (äta), producing "hösa" and "heta", respectively. On the other hand, the Eastern Åland dialects share features with Swedish dialects in Åboland and southern Ostrobothnia.

Between the dialects of Western and Eastern Åland, there are also several distinctions in vocabulary. For example, in Western Åland, as well as in Uppland, the verb krypa and the adjective kullig are used. The corresponding words in Eastern Åland are kräka and snuvig.

== Samples of dialects ==
Eckerö-dialect (West Åland) recorded in 2006 (see file för transcription).

Föglö-dialect (East Åland) recorded in 1971 by Per Henrik Solstrand.

== See also ==
- Languages of Åland

== Bibliography ==
- Andersson, Sven. Notlage, notlösare och notgår: ordens betydelse i åländska folkmål. Part of Skrifter utgivna av Historiska samfundet i Åbo. 1954. pp. 18–30.
- Ramsdahl, Carl. Ryska lånord i åländskan. 1976.
- Sundberg, Eva. Dialekten i Ålands nordöstra skärgård. Mariehamn 1993.
- Svenblad, Ralf. Med åländska ord. Mariehamn 1996.
- Willandt, August. Åländskt bygdemål. 1919.
