= Reko Lundán =

Reko Lundán (2 April 1969 – 27 October 2006) was a Finnish television presenter, writer, screen writer and journalist best known for his work on Aamu-TV in 2003. He had worked with actors such as Pasi Heikura.

His novel "Ilman suuria suruja" won the 2002 Helsingin Sanomat Literature Prize for the best debut novel.

He died of a brain tumor on 27 October 2006.
