= Everest Vietnam =

- Country of origin: Vietnam

Original release
- Network: HTV, sponsor Number One, THP

Everest 2008 - Vietnam Spirit To The World (EVN - Vietnamese: Chinh phục Everest - Tinh thần Việt Nam hòa cùng thế giới) is a reality show in co-operation between Ho Chi Minh City Television (HTV) and Lasta company to bring the very first Vietnamese people to Mt. Everest with the message "Vietnam Spirit To The World".

== Premise ==
Everest is a legendary mountain that everybody wants to discover, and further, to conquer. EVN 2008 is the event to bring Vietnamese to conquer "the roof of the world" as well as a chance for Vietnam to tell the world that Vietnamese people are ready to subjugate high mounts, bring Vietnam Spirit to the global sea.

It will be the first reality show in the world about mountain climbing and Mt. Everest which will be broadcast daily on HTV channel.

Viewers can expect to join in the venturous journey of Climbers, to see effort of each of them overcoming series of physically, mentally and teamwork spirit demanding challenges.

Besides, the show also includes interesting information of mysterious landscapes, distinctive cultures and local lives along the journey.

This is a great chance to introduce a Vietnam that is full of subduing desires, ultimate wills to get over difficulties. Climbers do not seek their personal glories but the whole country's.

== Journey ==
=== Training Stage: From the top of Vietnam to the top of the World ===
Stage 1

After choosing 20 contestants throughout Vietnam, contestants take part in the qualifying round with physical, mental and teamwork spirit tests at Fansipan peak.

- Fansipan: After the training course, 12 contestants will be eliminated based on the appraisals of coaches, doctors and experts.
- 8 remaining ones fly directly to Hong Kong to get clothes and devices for the climbing journey.

Stage 2

- 8 contestants have the first climbing course at Mount Kinabalu, second highest peak in Southeast Asia, for 7 days
- After the first conquering, 2 more contestants will go home.

Stage 3

- Training at Kilimanjaro, Tanzania for about 15 days.
- In the end of this training course, one more contestant will have to say goodbye to the show.

Stage 4

- Island Peak: for 21 days.
- After the third subjugation, the fourth one will be eliminated, just only 4 contestants remaining after Stage 3.

Stage 5

- Training in Vietnam for 2 months.
- 4 Climbers join in stamina training courses because the weather at Himalaya is so severe and big storms obstructing climbing in the winter.

=== Conquering Stage: Conquering Everest ===
· Time: April – June, 2008

· Present images of the journey to Nepal starting the conquering the highest mountain in the World

· June, 2008: Climbers get back to home, the journey ends in Vietnam.

== See also ==
- TITV Everest 2007
