= International Media Distribution =

American media company

- Company type: Subsidiary
- Industry: Ethnic media; Broadcasting
- Founded: 1996; 30 years ago
- Headquarters: Centennial, Colorado, United States
- Services: Broadcasting; Marketing
- Parent: NBCUniversal Media Group
- Website: imediadistribution.com

International Media Distribution (IMD) (formerly International Networks), a division of NBCUniversal, is an American provider of in-language networks which facilitates the distribution of Asian, European, Middle Eastern and Hispanic channels and Video On Demand services across all platforms including, cable, satellite and OTT.

== History ==
Originally launched as International Channel Networks in 1996, the company was owned by Liberty Media (which was the majority owner with a 90% stake) and JJS II Communications, LLC (which owned the remaining 10% share). They owned and operated The International Channel or I-Channel, which was a basic cable channel that launched in 1990 and featured multilingual, multi-ethnic programming to audiences in the United States. The channel offered programming from Europe, Asia & the Middle East in over 25 languages. In 1998, the company began offering a tier of premium networks featuring various channels from around the world. This tier has since grown and currently consists of over 50 networks. In 2000, they added channels in the Persian, Russian and Japanese languages. Around that time, more cable head-ends were carrying at least The International Channel and some of its premium networks.

International Channel Networks logo

In July 2004, as part of a larger deal, International Channel Networks was sold to Comcast. In 2005, Comcast re-branded the International Channel as AZN Television, a channel catering to Asian Americans and featuring several original programmes. Its non-Asian programming was removed, redirecting viewers to its distributed premium channels. The company was subsequently renamed International Networks.

On April 9, 2008, AZN Television ceased operations as Comcast decided to shut down the channel due to distribution and advertising difficulties.

On March 10, 2009, Comcast decided to rename the company as International Media Distribution. The re-brand was undertaken to reflect the growth of the company and to emphasize the focus which is now on the distribution of premium international channels from around the world. In 2011, Comcast completed its purchase of NBCUniversal, thereafter IMD was reorganized under the international television distribution arm of NBCUniversal rather than the Comcast Entertainment Group.

== Premium Television Networks ==
=== Current ===
International Media Distribution’s portfolio includes over 50 networks from across the world including:

Arabic

- ART America

Chinese

- CCTV-4
- CGTN Documentary
- CTI-Zhong Tian Channel
- Phoenix North America Chinese Channel
- Phoenix InfoNews Channel
- Phoenix Hong Kong Channel (Cantonese)
- CGTN (English)
- Jubao (FAST/AVOD)
- Great Wall (expanded package of mainland Chinese channels)

Filipino

- The Filipino Channel (TFC)
- Myx TV (English)
- ABS-CBN News Channel
- Cinema One
- Filipino On Demand (SVOD)
- Aliwko (FAST/AVOD)

French

- TV5MONDE
- TV5MONDE Cinema On Demand
- Tivi5MONDE
- TV5MONDE Info
- TV5MONDE Style

German

- DW Deutsch+

Greek

- ANT1 Satellite

Italian

- Mediaset Italia

Korean (Television Korea)

- TVK
- TVK2
- TVK-Pop On Demand

Polish

- TVP Polonia

Russian

- Channel One Russia
- Dom Kino Premium
- TeleCafe
- RTN
- RTN+
- THT

South Asian

- ABP News
- Eros Now (Subscription VOD)
- TV Asia
- Aapka Colors
- Colors Rishtey
- MTV India
- Colors Cineplex
- Colors Tamil
- Colors Kannada
- Colors Bangla
- Colors Marathi
- News 18
- Desi Play TV (FAST/AVOD)
- TV Asia Comedy (FAST/AVOD)
- Life OK (FAST/AVOD)

Spanish

- Cinema Dinamita
- Picardia Nacional (SVOD)
- PX Sports
- VePlus
- Novelísima (FAST/AVOD; from Grupo Cisneros)
- Pelimex (FAST/AVOD; from Frontera Films)

Vietnamese

- SBTN

Formerly distributed

- Scandinavian Channel (defunct)
- Rang-A-Rang (Persian)
- National Iranian Television (Persian)
- Lifestyle Network
- TV Japan
