= Strömsö =

- Genre: Lifestyle
- Original language: Swedish (subtitled in Finnish)
- No. of seasons: 159

Production
- Running time: Sundays at 5:05 p.m.

Original release
- Network: Yle Fem and Yle TV1
- Release: August 29, 2002

Strömsö is a Finnish television program (in Swedish) which premiered in 2002 on FST and TV1, hosted by Matias Jungar and Susanna Ström-Wilkinson. The show concentrates on various household subjects, such as cooking and gardening. Its fifth season started on January 29, 2006. Since the beginning of 2007 the show is hosted by Lee Esselström and Jocke Lax.

The show is made at Strömsö (from which the show gets its name), a villa north of the city of Vaasa. The villa was built in the 1860s and served as the summer residence for a merchant family from Vaasa for about 100 years.

Season	Number of episodes
2002	18
2003	46
2004	41
2005	40
2006	50
2007	N/A

== Staff ==
- Lee Esselström, host, expert on hobbies
- Jocke Lax, host
- Paul Svensson, cooking expert
- Susanna Ström-Wilkinson, editor (former host)
- Matias Jungar, editor (former host)
- Michael Björklund, cooking expert
- Jim Björni, workshop expert
- Catharina Borg-Wilén, gardening expert
- Wivan Fagerudd, gardening reporter
- Camilla Forsén, art expert
- Elisabeth Morney, feature editor
- Owe Salmela, florist
- Noora Vuorimaa, wine expert
- Johan Ångerman, carpenter
- Anna Svensson, expert on chicken vilog
- Lena Gillberg, gardening expert
