= Yle Nyheter =

Yle Nyheter is the Swedish language online news service of Yleisradio (Yle), the Finnish national broadcaster. It is generally updated only during daytime hours (i.e., new stories are not added at night unless there is an exceptional event). Prior to August 2007, the service was called Internytt.

== See also ==
- TV-nytt
