= AZN Television =

American TV channel

- AZN Television logo
- Country: United States

Ownership
- Owner: International Networks (Comcast)

History
- Launched: July 1990; 36 years ago (as International Channel)
- Closed: April 9, 2008; 18 years ago

AZN Television (formerly called International Channel) was an American cable TV channel which promoted itself as "the network for Asian America". It was run by International Networks, a wholly owned subsidiary of Comcast Corporation. The channel's programming targeted the fast-growing, young, affluent, English-speaking Asian-American community. Genres included the most popular Asian films, dramas, documentaries and music as well as a diverse slate of original programming. Until the 2005 reformatting, it had a broader schedule, which also had European and Middle Eastern programming which were gradually dropped when the channel was bought by Comcast. It competed in certain markets with ImaginAsian Television.

== History ==
=== The International Channel ===
The channel was launched as the International Channel in July 1990, and was initially owned by a joint venture of Liberty Media (which had a 90% stake) and JJS II Communications, LLC (which had the remaining 10% stake). The channel was led by George Leitner; as of March 1992, the channel was already popular among certain ethnic enclaves with potential, and had seen growth due to its rights to the 1992 Cricket World Cup, shared with Netlink.

As of 1993, the International Channel had news, sports, music, and entertainment programming in 17 languages and was available to over three million households. Among International Channel's early programming with Pei-Pei's Time, a Mandarin-language talk show hosted by former Hong Kong actress Cheng Pei-pei. Debuting in 1992, Pei-Pei's Time was compared to The Oprah Winfrey Show by Kathleen Kelleher of the Los Angeles Times and discussed topics considered taboo in Chinese media such as homosexuality, interracial marriage, and racism.

By 1996, the International Channel began producing daily news programs in Mandarin, Cantonese, and Vietnamese, with the resources of ABC and Worldwide Television News, in addition to broadcasting international news from FCI News (Japan), KBS (South Korea), RAI (Italy), and elsewhere.

Beginning in the late 1990s, the International Channel added anime shows in their original Japanese. Dragon Ball Z was added in January 1997. Then in 2000, International Channel expanded its anime programming with Armored Trooper VOTOMS and The Irresponsible Captain Tylor. Although Captain Tylor was set to premiere on September 7, the broadcast was delayed for nearly a month due to the master tapes not arriving on time. Later in the early 2000s, International Channel's anime lineup expanded to include Dragon Ball GT, El-Hazard, and Tenchi Muyo.

The channel was sold to Comcast when it purchased its parent company, International Networks (now International Media Distribution) in July 2004.

=== Comcast takeover, repositioning as AZN Television ===
Under Comcast, beginning in the final quarter of 2004, the network began a transitional phase to cater more towards Asian audiences, beginning the gradual removal of European and Middle Eastern programs from its schedule, before removing them completely by the second quarter of 2005. This repositioning was officially announced in January 2005, aiming to expand access to easily-accessible Asian programming in English, while its former audiences moved to international channels distributed by ICN. On March 28, 2005, Comcast rebranded The International Channel to AZN Television, which now focused purely on Asian and Asian-American culture. The name AZN came from the mobile phone shorthand slang for "Asian".

In order to better accommodate its new target audience, the channel added a third timezone (Hawaii–Aleutian) and readjusted its Asian programming to new timeslots.

The channel also increased its original productions, including the sketch comedy series Asia Street Comedy, short film showcase Popcorn Zen, the Cinema AZN newsmagazine and documentaries on topics related to the community. The foreign programming was narrowed down to just Asian content, drawn in from countries such as India, Thailand, Singapore, Japan and other countries.

In late 2005, news of mass layoffs at the network prompted fears that Comcast would shut down AZN. However, the network remained on the air and continued to sponsor the annual Asian Excellence Awards, which highlights Asian American achievement in film and television. The network planned to premiere a new original show in September 2006, about four Asian-Americans tackling college application, the only such show announced.

=== Shutdown ===
In January 2008, Comcast announced it would be shutting down AZN and moving the Asian Excellence Awards show to E! The channel went off the air on April 9, 2008, at noon. The network was shut down as foreign language tiers with international networks, which have their own charges and feature content on networks International Channel struggled to balance onto a 168-hour weekly schedule, became much more popular, cost-effective, and had better quality controls, and more importantly, had programming originated on their own domestic networks.

== Programming ==
=== Dramas and sitcoms ===
- Abarenbou Mama (Japanese drama).
- Jumong (Korean historical drama)
- Dong yi (Korean historical drama)
- ABC DJ (Singaporean comedy)
- Achar! (Singaporean comedy)
- Akash (Hindi drama)
- Alejandra (Portuguese drama)
- Babul Ki Duayein Leti Ja (Hindi drama)
- Best Theater (Korean drama)
- Bonds of Blood (Cantonese drama)
- Book and Sword, Gratitude and Revenge (Chinese drama)
- Chandan Ka Paina Resham Ki Dori (Hindi drama)
- Chattan (Hindi drama)
- Coffee Prince (Korean drama)
- Dae Jo Young (Korean drama)
- The Daughter of a Thief (Korean drama)
- Dead Men Do Tell Tales (Chinese drama)
- The Dragon's Pearl (Thai drama)
- Dreams of Red Mansions (Mandarin drama)
- Emperor Kang Xi (Mandarin drama)
- Esperanza (Tagalog drama)
- Flames (Tagalog drama)
- Food, Glorious Food (Vietnamese drama)
- Full House (Korean drama)
- Good Morning General (Cantonese drama)
- Happy Flying Dragon (Cantonese drama)
- Happy Flying Dragon III (Cantonese drama)
- Here Comes the God of Wealth (Cambodian drama)
- High Kick! (Korean sitcom)
- Hong Gil-dong (Korean drama)
- Hotelier (Korean drama)
- Hwang Jini (Korean drama)
- Iryu 2 (Japanese drama)
- It started with a kiss (Taiwanese drama)
- Ivy Dreams (reality)
- Jewel in the Palace (Korean historical drama)
- Joyful Family (Vietnamese drama)
- King of Hades (Chinese folklore drama)
- Krystala (Filipino Fantasy/Adventure)
- Last Emperor (Mandarin drama)
- The Legend of Ne Zha (Cambodian drama)
- Legend of Yung Ching II (Cantonese drama)
- Living with Lydia (Singaporean sitcom)
- Love Revolution (Japanese drama)
- Love Truly (Korean drama)
- Mangang (Korean drama)
- MARS (Taiwanese drama)
- My Lovely Sam Soon (Korean drama)
- The Name of Love (Korean drama)
- One Gloomy Day (Korean drama)
- OP-7 (Swedish drama)
- Pangako Sa 'Yo (Tagalog drama)
- Popcorn (Korean drama)
- Popcorn Zen (short films)
- Power of Love (Japanese drama)
- Return of the Condor Heroes (Vietnamese drama)
- Riding the Storm (Cambodian drama)
- Righteous Guards II (Cantonese drama)
- Romantic Express (Mandarin drama)
- Cats on the Roof (a.k.a. Attic Cat) (Korean drama)
- Saara Akaash (Hindi drama)
- The Seven Swordsmen (Chinese drama)
- Legend of Heaven & Earth (Taiwanese/Vietnamese Fantasy Drama)
- Someday (Korean drama)
- The Song of Wind (Korean drama)
- Stories of the Han Dynasty (Chinese drama)
- The Story of Duk-Yi (Korean drama)
- Sun Wu (Vietnamese drama)
- Sweet Bride (Korean drama)
- Little Fish (Chinese Fantasy Drama)
- Thank You (Korean drama)
- A Wednesday Love Affair (Japanese drama)
- The Wedding Planner (Japanese drama)
- Winter Sonata (Korean drama)
- Young Master of Shaolin (Vietnamese drama)

=== News ===
- Al Jazeera Headline News (Arabic news)
- American Muslim Hour (Israeli other/English news)
- Antenna Satellite News (Greek news)
- Balitang America with Cara Subijano (Filipino-American Newscast)
- China News from Beijing (Mandarin news)
- Deutsche Welle News (German news)
- Fujisankei News (Japanese news)
- Global Report News (Vietnamese news)
- Hodo 2001 / Hodo 2002 (Japanese news)
- Insight (German news)
- International Report News (Cantonese news)
- Journal de France 2 (French news)
- LBC News (Arabic news)
- News Desk From Seoul (Korean news)
- NHK News (Japanese news)
- Oriental Horizons (Mandarin news)
- Pardres (Hindi news)
- Philippines Tonight (Tagalog news)
- Polsat News (Informacje, Polish news)
- Power News (Mandarin news)
- Romanian Voice (Romanian news)
- Russian News from Moscow: Vremya (Russian news)
- Russian News: NTV America (Russian news)
- Télématin (French news)
- Telegiornale (Italian news)
- TV Asia News (Hindi news)
- TV4 Daily (Dziennik TV4, Polish news)
- U.N. World Chronicle (English news)
- The Week in Review (Central America) (Spanish news)
- World Report (Mandarin news)

=== Variety/music ===
- ASAP (Filipino variety/music)
- Amanat (Hindi variety/music)
- Antakshri (Hindi variety/music)
- Arabic Variety (Arabic variety/music)
- Asian Variety Show (Hindi variety/music)
- Canape (French variety/music)
- Chinese Top 20 (Mandarin variety/music)
- Cinema AZN (30 minutes, weekly)
- Culture Club (Korean variety/music)
- French Feelings (French variety/music)
- Hey! Hey! Hey! Music Champ (Japanese variety/music)
- Hindi Variety (Hindi variety/music)
- Hungary 2001 / Hungary 2002 (Hungarian variety/music)
- inDialog (Hindi variety/music)
- Inside Britain (English variety/music)
- Italian Variety (Italian variety/music)
- Jerusalem OnLine (English variety/music)
- Joyful Gathering (Mandarin variety/music)
- Kev Koom Siab (Hmong variety/music)
- Khubsoorat (Hindi variety/music)
- Korean Music Countdown (Korean popular music)
- Kung Faux
- Late Night V (Hindi variety/music)
- Mexico de Mis Amores (Spanish variety/music)
- Mix Music Bang (music videos)
- Music Video Heaven (Korean variety/music)
- Pasand Apni Apni (Hindi variety/music)
- Pilipinas, Game KNB? (Filipino Game Show)
- popjapan.tv (Japanese music videos and interviews from Sony Music Japan artists)
- Punjabi Variety (Other variety/music)
- Rang TV (Punjabi) (other variety/music)
- Revolution (Korean and Japanese pop music videos)
- Russian Variety (Russian variety/music)
- Sa Re Ga Ma / Sa Re Ga Ma Pa (Hindi variety/music)
- Search World Best (Korean variety/music)
- Stateside (Tagalog variety/music)
- Super Gourmet Mission (Mandarin variety/music/other)
- Tanin (Persian variety/music)
- Tea Time (Mandarin variety/music)
- Unsolved Mystery (Korean variety/music)
- Victoria to Uyen Show (Vietnamese variety)
- What's Up Thailand (Thai music)
- Yeh Hai Mere Apne (Hindi variety/music)
- Zee Premiere Show (Hindi variety/music)

=== Anime ===
Anime shows were broadcast in Japanese with English subtitles, or English dub.

- Armored Trooper VOTOMS
- Bakugan Battle Brawlers
- Black Heaven
- Black Jack
- Darkside Blues
- Deltora Quest
- Descendants of Darkness
- Dragon Ball GT
- Dragon Ball Z
- El-Hazard: The Magnificent World
- El-Hazard: The Alternative World
- Fushigi Yugi
- Hoshin Engi
- Kishin Corps
- Kirby: Right Back at Ya!
- Kuma no Putaro
- Last Exile
- Legend of Himiko
- L/R: Licensed by Royalty
- Lost Universe
- Naruto
- Patlabor
- Princess Rouge
- Project A-ko
- Record of Lodoss War
- Revolutionary Girl Utena
- Roujin Z
- Slayers
- Slayers Next
- Slayers Try
- Sol Bianca: The Legacy
- Sonic X
- Space Pirate Mito
- Tai Chi Chasers
- Tenchi Muyo!
- Tenchi in Tokyo
- Tenchi Universe
- The Irresponsible Captain Tylor
- Tsukuyomi -Moon Phase-
- Urusei Yatsura
- World of Narue
- Wrath of the Ninja
- Yu-Gi-Oh! Duel Monsters
- Yu Yu Hakusho: The Movie

=== Other ===
- Asia's Best Kept Secret (Singaporean, travel)
- Asian Excellence Awards (annual)
- Asian Wok (Singaporean, cooking)
- Basta't Kasama Kita (Filipino Action/Adventure)
- Bayani (Tagalog children's)
- My Britain (English other)
- Children's Animation (French children's)
- Cross Talk (Mandarin other)
- Game K N B? (Tagalog other)
- Gourmet Moments (Singaporean cooking)
- Get Drunk In China
- Gilette World Sports (English sports)
- Groundling Marsh (Spanish children's)
- India Vision (Hindi other)
- Italian Soccer (Italian sports)
- LiAo Talk Show (Mandarin other)
- Math Tinik (Tagalog children's)
- The Message (English other)
- NBA Timeout (sports)
- Pocoyo (Spanish children's)
- Sineskwela (Tagalog children's)
- Stir TV (youth)
- Strut (travel)
- ToonHeads (Entertainment)
- Unicef (English other)
- Winx Club (Italian children's)
- Wool 100 Percent
- World of Rugby (English sports)
