= Television Korea =

American Korean-language TV channel

Television Korea (stylized as tvK) is an American Korean-speaking television broadcasting company, based in Los Angeles. The company operates two television channels (TVK and TVK2) and a VOD service with Korean music videos, which are available on cable companies in at least eighteen states, the District of Columbia and the overseas territory of Guam. The channels are handled by International Media Distribution.

== History ==
Eric Yoon founded Television Korea 24 in 2004 and set up a distribution agreement with ICN (the current IMD) to carry the soon-to-be-launched TVK channel on cable companies. The company was trademarked on February 1. Initial plans between the two companies, outlined in June 2004, included content sourced from Korean networks, with limited subtitled programming, as well as selected first-run titles. A VOD service was also planned for development. The channel was initially set to launch in the fourth quarter of 2004.

The main tvK channel (tvK1) started broadcasting on the Comcast system in Los Angeles in early March 2005. The company was planning the launch of a second channel (tvK2) later in 2005, catering to younger demographics, featuring music videos, entertainment news and videogame programming, but the company had to take extra time to plan its move because the affiliate contract with Comcast did not stipulate that the two channels were sequentially aligned. By broadcasting from Los Angeles, it already caught a sizable amount of the Korean population of the United States, which at the time, accounted for half of the total number of Korean-Americans. In November 2005, tvK started broadcasting Korean movies twice a week (on Wednesdays and Saturdays), becoming the first Korean network in the United States to air movies (up until then, the Korean diaspora relied on family-owned video rental stores). The network bought a package of 200 titles, which were used to feed the tvK On Demand service that the company was set to launch.

As of 2006, tvK24 had 465,000 subscribers in the LA Metro area alone. By 2007, the figure rose to 750,000.

In November 2009, the tvK2 channel planned in 2005 launched. The channel in its early years targeted a younger, more assimilated demographic than tvK1, and had more bilingual programs.

On December 4, 2009, J-Golf and tvK signed a commercial partnership agreement regarding coverage of the LPGA Tour, involving mainly the exchange of staff and resources between the two companies. J-Golf held the Korean broadcast rights since 2005 and, from 2010, tvK would begin carrying Korean-language coverage of the LPGA Tour to the United States.

On November 4, 2016, following a commercial agreement with KTH's K-Shopping, tvK1 started airing five slots of home shopping a day, selling only Korean products. KTH also planned to gradually expand the product catalog for the USA.
