= Sameradion =

Swedish Sámi public service radio station

Giron, Sweden; Sweden
- Broadcast area: Sápmi; Sweden

Programming
- Languages: Northern Sámi; Southern Sámi; Lule Sámi; Swedish
- Format: News, talk, music, entertainment, and sports

Ownership
- Owner: Sveriges Radio

History
- First air date: 1952 in Swedish; 1965 in Sámi

Links
- Website: Sameradion

Sameradion is the Sámi languages radio department of Swedish public service broadcaster Sveriges Radio (SR). Sameradion provides news, current affairs, cultural, sports, entertainment, and children’s programming for Sámi across Sweden. Sameradion is part of government efforts to support Sami culture.

== Broadcast operations ==
Sameradion broadcasts weekdays (2h25m per day) and Sundays (2h15min) on FM and DAB via Sveriges Radio P2, along with 15-minute twice-weekly broadcasts on P4 Jämtland and around the clock online via SR Sápmi. SR Sápmi also carries Sámi music, youth radio, sports, and public events. The channel broadcasts primarily in Northern Sámi, but also broadcasts regularly in Lule and Southern Sámi.

Ole Isak Mienna oversees Sameradion.

As part of SR, Sameradion and its sister television channel SET Sápmi work with reporters and bureaus across Sweden, but it also shares reporting and programming with NRK Sápmi and Yle Sami Radio, the Sámi-focused public services in Norway and Finland respectively. The station is based in Giron, Sweden, with bureaus in Arvidsjaur, Luleju, Umeå, and Stockholm, Sweden, as well as Guovdageaidnu and Kárášjohka, Norway.

In contrast to NRK Sámi Radio, Sameradion does not have a standalone radio antenna station of its own, not even on the Luleå-Piteå DAB multiplex. It does however have a 24/7 internet radio station, with the schedule mostly containing simulcasts with (and re-runs from) larger SR stations, imported shows from Norway, and music.

== History ==
Sameradion traces its roots to the early-1950s, when SR began broadcasting programming targeting Sámi listeners, albeit in Swedish. In 1960, SR launched "Sámi Ságat," a Swedish-language program for Sámi hosted by Nils Hövenmark. In 1965, Sameradion began broadcasting regularly in Sámi languages.
