= Toni Hellinen =

Finnish meteorologist and reporter

Toni Hellinen (born 21 September 1982 in Alavus) is a Finnish meteorologist and reporter. He came to prominence as a sports reporter during the 2020 Summer Olympics.
