= Tesvisio =

Former Finnish television channel

- Logo used from 1960–1965
- Country: Finland
- Broadcast area: Helsinki, Turku, Tampere

Ownership
- Owner: Tekniikan edistämissäätiö (1956–1959); Oy Tesvisio Ab (1960–1964); Oy Yleisradio Ab (1964–1965)
- Sister channels: Tamvisio; Turun TES-TV

History
- Launched: 20 April 1955 (test broadcasts); 21 March 1956 (regular programming)
- Closed: 6 March 1965
- Replaced by: Yle TV2
- Former names: TV-kerho (1956); TES-TV (1957–1960)

Tesvisio (earlier TES-TV) was the first television channel in Finland. It began regular broadcasts on 21 March 1956 and continued broadcasting until March 1965, when it was turned into Yle TV2.

The channel began as a television experiment by Radioinsinööriseura (later Elektroniikkainsinöörien seura), an association of radio and electronics engineers who had begun test broadcasts as early as 20 April 1955, from premises rented from the Helsinki University of Technology. Their first public broadcast, which was aired on 24 May 1955, is considered the first broadcast in Finnish television history. Regular broadcasts began in 1956 after the foundation Tekniikan edistämissäätiö began supporting the project; Yleisradio was then more focused on building and expanding its FM radio network and considered television to be less of a priority. The channel was soon named TES-TV after them. The final name Tesvisio was adopted in 1960 after the management was spun off into a separate company.

Tesvisio was a commercial channel funded by advertising. The main channel aired initially only in and around the capital Helsinki, while the sister channels Tamvisio and Turun TES-TV aired in Tampere and Turku, respectively. The three stations regularly also broadcast each other's programmes.

The company began to suffer economic difficulties in the early 1960s. After the public broadcaster Yleisradio began their television broadcasts in 1957, a new commercial broadcaster, Mainostelevisio, had begun broadcasting programme blocks on Yleisradio's channel. As the coverage of Yleisradio's and thus indirectly Mainostelevisio's broadcasts expanded, Tesvisio found it increasingly harder to attract advertisers. In 1964, Yleisradio acquired the nearly bankrupt company. There were initially plans to absorb the assets into the existing public TV channel, but in the end a decision was made to reorganize them into a second TV channel (TV-ohjelma 2, now Yle TV2), which would be headquartered in Tampere in the offices of then Tamvisio. Tesvisio's final broadcast was on 6 March 1965, and TV2 commenced broadcasts the following day.
