= Yle Teema & Fem =

Finnish television channel

- Logo used since 2017
- Country: Finland
- Broadcast area: Nationwide

Programming
- Languages: Swedish (Original Fem shows, subs for Norwegian/Danish shows, subs for some Teema shows); Finnish (Subtitles for most shows)
- Picture format: 1080i HDTV

Ownership
- Owner: Yle
- Sister channels: Yle TV1; Yle TV2

History
- Launched: 24 April 2017; 9 years ago
- Replaced: Yle Fem; Yle Teema

Links
- Website: Yle Fem; Yle Teema

Availability

Terrestrial
- Digital terrestrial: Channel 5 (HD)

Streaming media
- Yle Areena: Watch live

Yle Teema & Fem is a Finnish free-to-air television channel owned by Finnish state broadcaster Yle. It was launched on 24 April 2017, after Yle Teema and Yle Fem merged to form this channel.

Teema & Fem is Yle's channel for culture, education, and science. The "Teema" hours focus on recordings of performing arts, classical music, art, and history documentaries, films, and themed programming. The channel also broadcasts Swedish-language news (including the Swedish-language evening bulletin TV-nytt), factual and children's programmes and entertainment as part of the "Fem" hours. It also shows many Nordic films and series and previously aired the Sami-language Ođđasat until that show got moved to Yle TV1. Finnish and Swedish subtitles are available for programmes which are not originally in those respective languages. Outside prime time, Teema & Fem showed selected programmes acquired from Sveriges Television, Sweden's equivalent of Yle, until May 2017.

== Notable programming ==
- BUU-klubben (children's show)
- Strömsö (cooking show)
- Moominvalley
- Yle Nyheter TV-nytt (Swedish-language main newscast)

=== Imports ===
- (France) Shetland
- (Germany) Die Vertoust
- (Germany) Dogs of Berlin (Aired on Yle TV2)
- (Germany) You Are Wanted (Aired on Yle TV2)
- (Sweden) Solsidan
- (Sweden) Solbasker
- (Sweden) Doobidoo
- (Sweden) Studio 65
- (United States) Narcos (Aired on Yle TV2)
- (United States) Patriot (Aired on Yle TV2)
- (United States) The Last Tychoon
- (Norway) Ragnarök (Aired on Yle TV2)
- (Norway) Team Bachstad
- (Denmark) Spise med Price
- (Denmark) Carmen Curlers
- (United Kingdom) Who Killed the KLF?
- (United Kingdom) Eve
- (United Kingdom) Malory Towers
- (Republic of Ireland) (Canada) Alva's World
- (Canada) Snowsnaps
- (Italy) Il paradiso delle signore
- (Spain) La Promesa
- (Spain) Todas las mañanas del mundo
