= TV Klelé =

Community television station in Guinea-Bissau

- Type: television station
- Branding: TV Klelé
- Country: Guinea-Bissau
- Availability: Bissau
- Launch date: Septebmber 13, 2001

TV Klelé (TVK) is a community television station in Guinea-Bissau, created in the neighborhood of Quelelé in Bissau. Guinean NGO Acção para o Desenvolvimento (AD) founded it in 2001 with the result of the success of community radio stations which had been previously created. The initiative was conceived as a tool of communication to develop the local community. The station produces audiovisual content mainly oriented to the neighborhood of Quelelé, with the aim of informing, raising awareness and warning topics relevant to the community, emphasizing positive affairs and improving negative aspects. What is initially seen only in Quelelé, is later seen in other regions.

The civil entity is a nonprofit, maintaining its independence from political parties, churches, government and the economic power. Its main source of funding is from audiovisual production.

As of 2021, Demba Sanhá was the station's director.

From November, when the rainy season ends, TVK's team travels throughout Guinea-Bissau to project films in distant communities and with less access, as well as assuring the implication of people in the project.

The station has a collaboration agreement with Laboratório Digital do Património Cultural (LDPC).

== Beginning ==
In its beginning, TVK recorded programs of about 45 minutes, with news, reports and themed programs related to basic sanitation, health and nutrition, family economy and community problems (such as the cholera epidemic, the state of degradation of the prosthesis center at that time and the importance of rehabilitating it, among others). They were broadcast twice a month in the interior of the Quelelé neighborhood, through a television monitor powered by a small portable generator, managing to make television in the street with few resources.

== Training ==
The station is also a training location for the youth, where they acquire specialized skills, and it facilitates their access to employment in the field of communication.

== Audiovisual production ==
With the experience acquired over the years, and with specialized teams and technicians, TV Klelé began to provide audiovisual production services, such as event coverage, radio spots, the production of documentaries, films or video clips. Among its clients, there are national and international institutions, other NGOs and private citizens. Thus, it has become a benchmark in the community communication sector in the country.

== Accolades ==
The project has received recognition for its contribution to the development of the local community through the production of audiovisual content. TV Klelé produced the film Tapioca, fonte de nutrição e economia familiar (Tapioca, source of nutrition and family economy) (2013) which received the Osiris Award at the international film festival on rural development Agrofilm, in Slovakia.
