= Sveticism =

Grammatical construction, loanword or calque originating from Swedish

A Sveticism (English: /ˈsvɛtɪsɪzəm/) is a grammatical construction, loanword or calque originating from the Swedish language.

Sveticisms are particularly found in the Finnish language, because Finland's governing bureaucracy was mostly Swedish-speaking until the 20th century. The use of Swedish grammatical constructions in official speech is a particularly persistent habit. The Swedish kommer att future tense is an example, being translated to tulla + third infinitive in illative case, e.g. talo tullaan rakentamaan < Swedish huset kommer att byggas 'the house will be built'. The language regulator recommends against such usage in official speech.

Sveticisms are also common in Norwegian. Swedish loanwords in Norwegian include words such as kjendis ('celebrity'), kompis ('friend') and the prefix el- ('electric') as well as phrases such as saken er biff ('everything has been taken care of') and på sikt ('in the long run').

Sveticisms in English are loanwords, such as smörgåsbord, ombudsman, tungsten, orienteering, moped and running the gauntlet (reinterpretation of Swedish gatlopp).
