= Taiwan Indigenous Television =

Taiwanese TV channel

Taiwan Indigenous Television 原住民族電視台
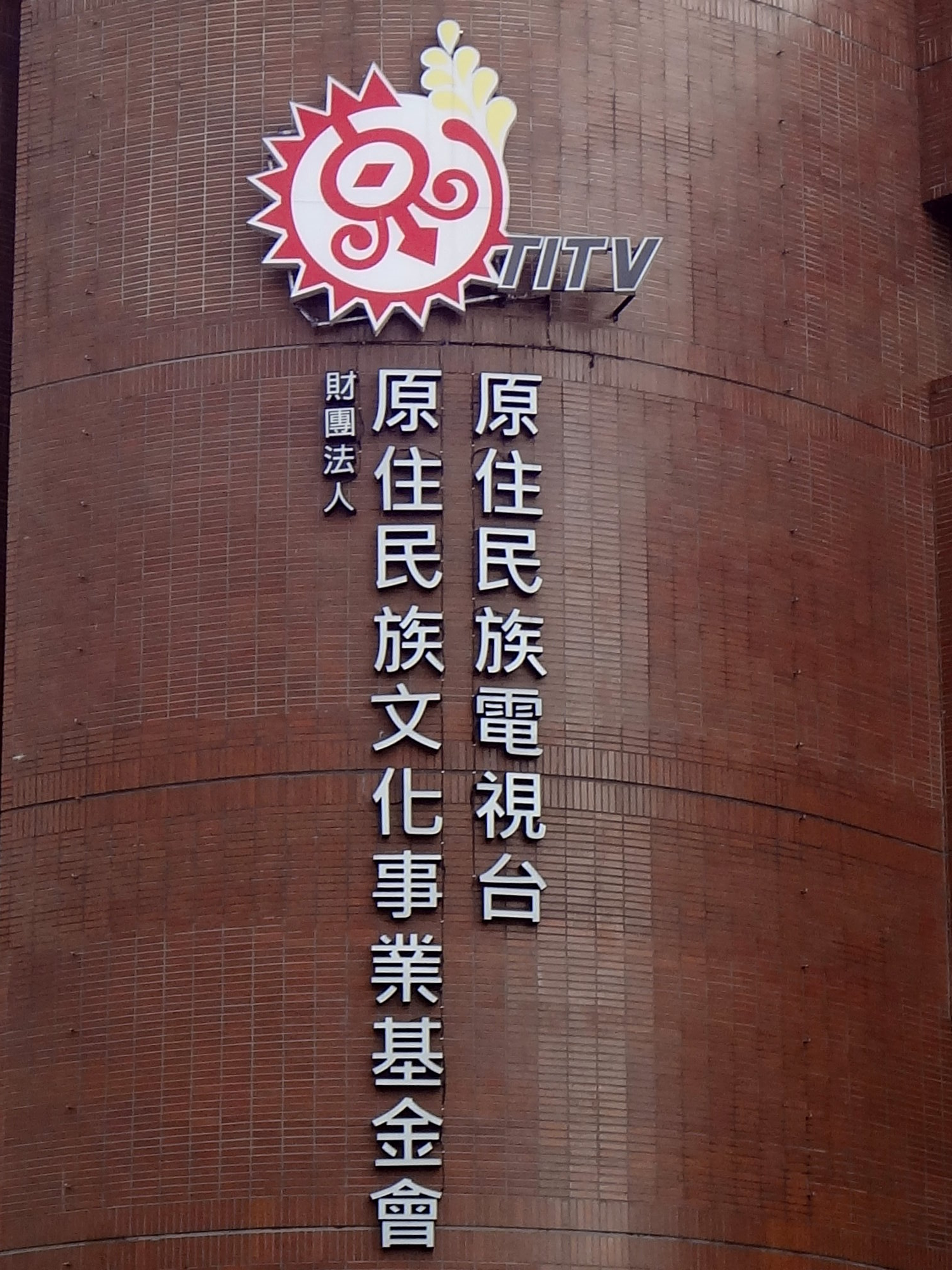
- Country: Taiwan
- Broadcast area: Taiwan

History
- Launched: 2005-07-01

Links
- Website: http://www.ipcf.org.tw/english.jsp

Availability

Terrestrial
- Digital: Channel 30; LCN: 13

Taiwan Indigenous Television (TITV; Chinese: 原住民族電視台; pinyin: Yuánzhù Mínzú Diànshìtái) is a satellite cable channel in Taiwan devoted to indigenous issues and culture, launched on July 1, 2005, becoming the first such channel in Asia.

In January 2007, TITV joined the operation of Taiwan Broadcasting System (TBS) and transformed into a non-commercial public media platform. In 2014, TITV became independently operated by the Indigenous Peoples Cultural Foundation.

== History ==
=== 1962 ===
In 1962, Taiwan Television (TTV) started broadcasting at a time when broadcasting regulations did not specifically protect minorities. The operational guidelines of the Government Information Office (GIO) stipulated that the allocation, control, and use of broadcasting resources "should give consideration to the rights and benefits of minorities and disadvantaged groups".

=== 1980s ===
Since the 1980s, social activism brought about major changes in Taiwan, and as native peoples became aware of their own identities and rights, they wanted to have more programs in their mother tongue.

In 1984, the indigenous radio program Green Mountain and Jade Hill, produced by Fu Hsing Broadcasting Station, was broadcast.

In 1985, the indigenous TV program Spring in the Green Mountains was produced by Public Television Video Production (公共電視節目製播組), a subordinate unit of the Broadcasting Development Foundation (BDF).

=== 1990s ===
In 1990, the Council for Cultural Affairs (CCA) of the Executive Yuan and GIO began subsidizing the production of indigenous and Hakka programs.

In 1992, broadcasting channels were opened to public access. With five new TV stations, 35 medium power stations, and 46 low power stations, there were around 200 stations in Taiwan, only one of which, Lanan, covered indigenous peoples’ issues.

In September 1994, the PTS Preparation Committee recruited 24 indigenous people for training as professionals in the visual production industry, 11 of whom were selected for their outstanding performance to work as journalists at PTS. This has helped more indigenous people become a formal part of the media industry since that time.

On December 1, 1996, the Council of Indigenous Peoples of the Executive Yuan (CIP) was set up with the express responsibility for consulting with the indigenous media.

On May 31, 1997 the Public Television Service Act was passed, Article 11 of which states that indigenous programs should "maintain diversity, objectivity, fairness, and consider the balance among different ethnic groups", and that the programming, interviewing, filming, editing, and narration should all be done by indigenous journalists. The first indigenous TV program production team was thus formed.

==== Education Act For Indigenous Peoples ====
In June 1998, the Education Act For Indigenous Peoples (原住民族教育法) was passed. Article 26 of the act stipulated that a channel or TV station expressly run by and for native peoples must be established (amended in 2004 as Article 29).

PTS began formal broadcasting in July 1998. The station was the first to introduce a native produced program, Formosa Aboriginal News Magazine. Transmitter locations, however, prevented many indigenous areas from effectively receiving the signal. With PTS as a cultivator and platform, indigenous talents in the TV industry have fully demonstrated their professional capacities. Unfortunately, they mainly work in Taipei, a place where they cannot observe the detailed problems and the needs of indigenous villages over an extended period of time.

To help indigenous people to voice their needs and accurately report on the situation of indigenous villages in different places, the News Department of PTS started the Indigenous TV Talent Cultivation Program. The second tier of the program began in March 2001 with funding from the CIP and Council of Labor Affairs(CLA) and the third tier commenced in July 2002. More than 60 skilled people capable of producing a program independently were trained over the course of the three-tiered program.

=== 2000s ===
In 2001, when the second tier of the cultivation program was in operation, the Deputy Minister of the CIP, Kao Cheng-shang (Bajack Gilin), commissioned PTS to promote the establishment of a TV channel exclusively by and for indigenous people.

In 2003, a budget of NT$330 million was earmarked, but was frozen by the Legislative Yuan pending the improvement of signal transmission in indigenous areas.

In September 2003, the GIO and CIP worked on formulating the policy of Shared Satellite and Disk for Radio and Television Stations; under which the government would rent a dedicated transmission satellite and draw up a budget to distribute satellite receiver to indigenous families in mountain areas to ensure signal reception.

In 2004, the Legislative Yuan approved the establishment of a TV station exclusively targeted at indigenous people, to be located on channel 16. However, inadequate production facilities forced the programming to be produced by another TV station. According to government procurement regulations, contracts must be subject to an open bidding process. As a result, Taiwan Television won the bid. Trial broadcasting started on December 1, 2004 and official broadcasting began on July 1, 2005, formally establishing the first indigenous TV station in Asia. The second bid was conducted in the second half of the same year and was awarded to Eastern Television (ETTV).

Three bids were conducted within the first one and a half years since Taiwan Indigenous Television (TITV) started to operate after approval. This caused some anxiousness among the crew as long term plans cannot be made without a steady foundation. With the implementation of the policy of eliminating the involvement of political parties, political forces, and the military from the media, the Legislative Yuan reviewed the Statute Regarding the Disposition of Government Shareholdings in the Terrestrial Television Industry, Article 14 of which stipulated: "the production and broadcasting of indigenous TV programs should be executed by the Public Television Service Foundation effective the year following the Act’s promulgation".

==== 2007 ====
In January 2007, Public Television Service Foundation established TITV as an operational branch. The station has gone on to become a non-commercial public media platform for indigenous people to voice their opinions, ensure their right to be informed, and pass down their cultural heritage.

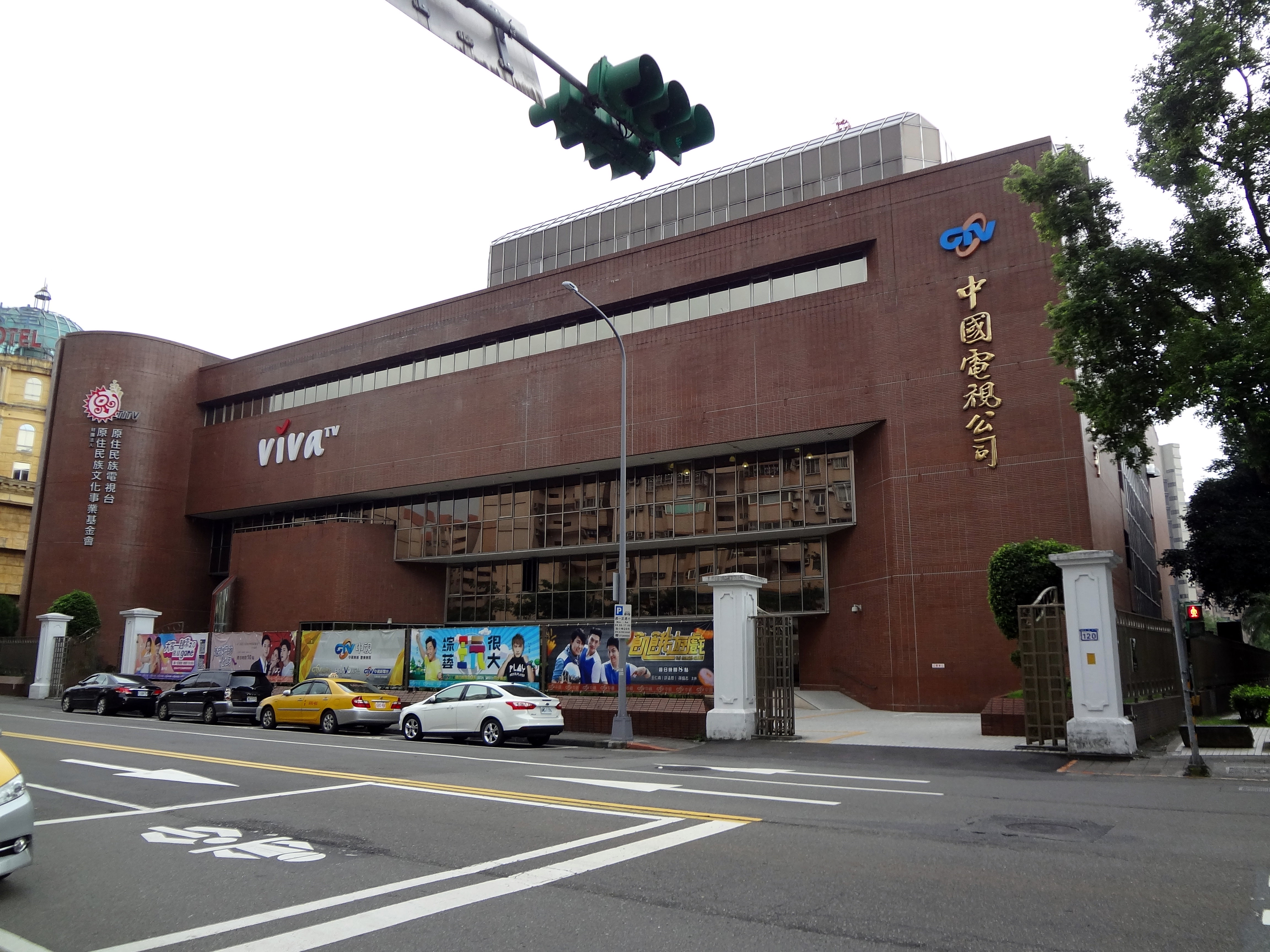
TITV at China Television Building, 2016

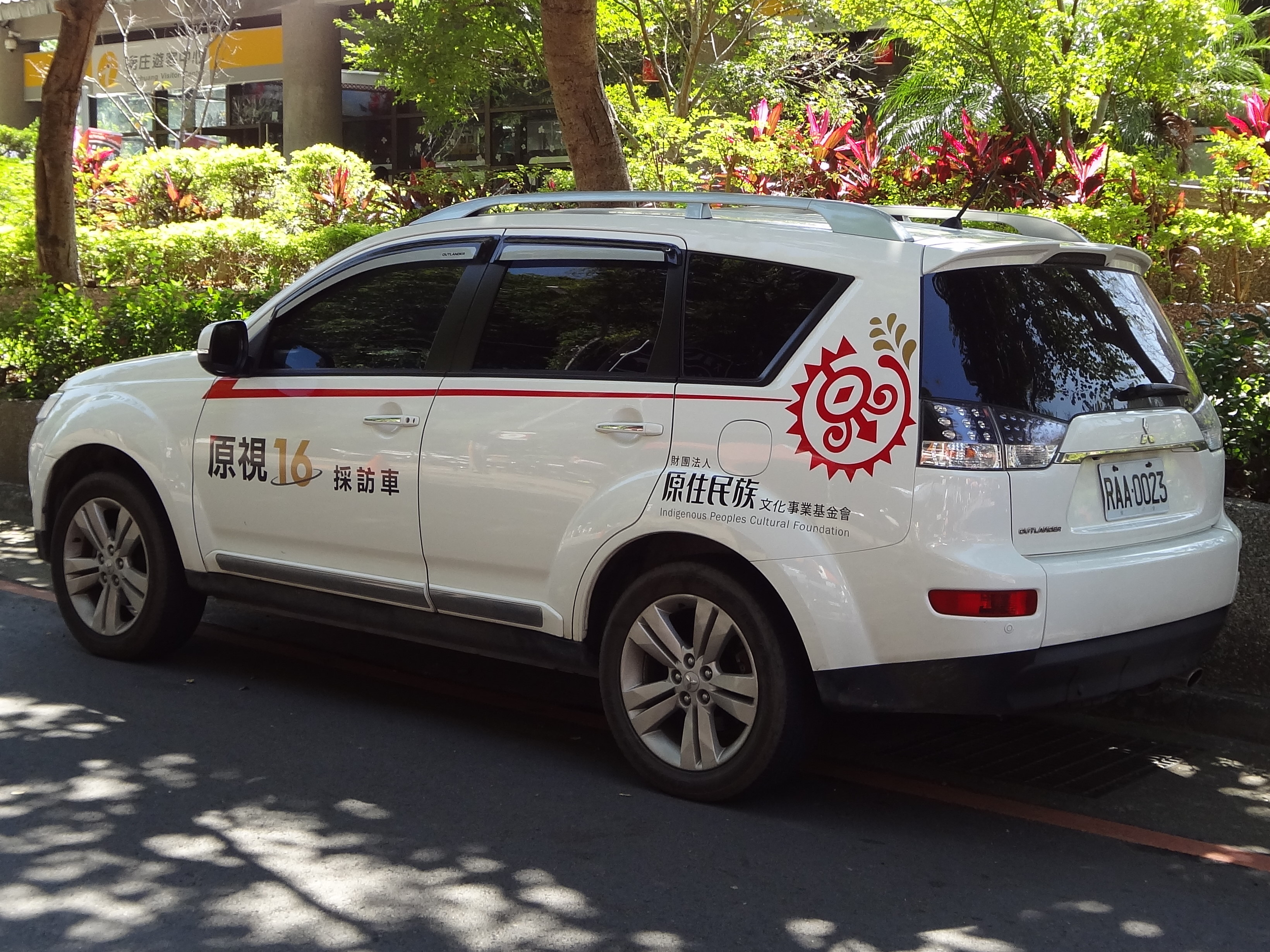
TITV news car, 2015

==== 2016 ====
On July 6, 2016, TITV launched on terrestrial TV service in Taiwan, and then became able to be receive with antenna, especially for audiences in indigenous villages.

== Overview ==
=== Executive Team ===
- Chief Director: Masao Aki (Atayal people)
- News Department: Olo Kumu (Amis people)
- Program Department Manager: Maraos (Tao people)
- Marketing Department: Mei Wang

== See also ==
- WITBN
- S4C (Wales)
- BBC Alba (Scotland)
- TG4 (Republic of Ireland)
- Aboriginal Peoples Television Network (Canada)
