= Yle Teema =

Finnish television channel

- Logo used since 2012-2017
- Country: Finland
- Broadcast area: Finland

Programming
- Language: Finnish
- Picture format: 576i (16:9 SDTV); 1080i (16:9 HDTV) Channel is broadcast on DVB-T (HD on T2) and DVB-C

Ownership
- Owner: Yle
- Sister channels: Yle Teema HD; Yle TV1; Yle TV2; Yle Fem; Yle TV1 HD; Yle TV2 HD; Yle Fem HD

History
- Launched: 27 August 2001
- Replaced: Yle Teema & Fem
- Closed: 24 April 2017

Links
- Website: areena.yle.fi/tv

Availability

Terrestrial
- Digita: Channel 7
- DNA: Channel 27 (HD)

Yle Teema was a Finnish television channel owned and operated by Finnish public broadcasting company Yle. The channel was dedicated to culture, sciences and learning. The channel was known for its "Theme Saturday" (Teemalauantai/Tema Lördag), which typically consisted of documentaries and classic international films.

Yle Teema began broadcasting on 27 August 2001. Yle Fem and Yle Teema merged on 24 April 2017 into one channel, Yle Teema & Fem.
