= Yle Sámi Radio =

Finnish public service radio station for Sámi people

- Finland
- Broadcast area: Limited parts of Finnish Lapland
- Frequencies: Rovaniemi: 103.0 MHz; Inari: 101.9 MHz; Dánsejohka: 100.5 MHz; Karigasniemi: 100.8 MHz; Kilpisjärvi: 103.7 MHz; Kuttanen: 102.2 MHz; Lámmasoaivi: 101.2 MHz; Nuorgam: 101.2 MHz; Nuvvos: 101.7 MHz; Näätämö: 103.3 MHz; Utsjoki: 102.6 MHz; Vuotso: 101.3 MHz; Ylläs: 103.8 MHz

Programming
- Languages: Northern Sami; Finnish; Skolt Sami; Inari Sami
- Network: Yle

Ownership
- Owner: Yle
- Sister stations: Yle Radio Suomi

History
- Founded: 1947 (original); 1 November 1991 (current)

Links
- Webcast: https://areena.yle.fi/podcastit/ohjelmat/yle-sami-radio
- Website: https://yle.fi/sapmi

Yle Sámi Radio (Northern Sami: Sámi Radio) is a regional unit of the Finnish Broadcasting Company (Yle) that produces radio news for the Sámi people. Yle's first regular Sámi radio broadcasts began in Oulu in autumn 1947, and it has had its own dedicated radio channel since 1991, after having been previously transmitted as block programming on the national first, second and third radio channels. Sámi Radio has journalists in Inari, Utsjoki and Karesuvanto.

Yle Sámi Radio is broadcast in the northernmost areas of Finnish Lapland. FM coverage anywhere further south is almost non-existent; as although Yle's official FM frequency guide lists exact places for the antennas instead of municipalities, their guide appears to skip 5 of the 6 most populated places in Lapland (and all places in all other Finnish counties), with only Rovaniemi having known coverage south of Ylläs.

Broadcasting in Sami languages are aired 5 days a week on weekdays, at 07:00-11:00 and 14:00-18:30 on Mondays through Wednesdays, and at 07:00-11:00 and 14:00-20:30 on Thursdays and Fridays. The slots from 16:00-18:30 all weekdays are reserved for content from NRK Sámi Radio and Sameradion. At all other times, including the entirety of Saturdays and Sundays, the station simulcasts Yle Radio Suomi in Finnish.

== See also ==
- NRK Sápmi
- Sameradion
