= Yle TV1 =

Finnish television channel

- Logo used since 5 March 2012
- Country: Finland
- Broadcast area: Finland, reaching bordering regions via overspill of the Finish terrestrial network

Programming
- Languages: Finnish; Swedish (Rare option as alternate digital subtitles, sporadic original productions); Northern Sami (Short daily newscasts); Russian (Short daily newscast)
- Picture format: 1080i HDTV

Ownership
- Owner: Yle
- Sister channels: Yle TV2; Yle Teema & Fem

History
- Launched: 13 August 1957 (test transmissions); 1 January 1958 (regular programming)
- Former names: Suomen Televisio (1958–1965); TV-ohjelma 1 (1965–1972)

Links
- Website: www.yle.fi/tv1

Availability

Terrestrial
- Digital terrestrial: Channel 1 (HD)

Streaming media
- Yle Areena: Watch live (Limited programming outside Finland)

Yle TV1 (Finnish: Yle TV Yksi, Swedish: Yle TV Ett) is a Finnish television channel owned and operated by Finnish public broadcaster Yle. It is the second-oldest television channel in Finland, after TES-TV, and is the oldest currently existing television channel in the country. More than 70% of the channel's programs are documentaries, news, or educational programmes. It is commonly referred to as Ykkönen, deriving from Yle's ownership of channels Spots 1 and 2 by default in Finland, with the other channel spot being Yle TV2.

== History ==
The channel started test transmissions on 13 August 1957 and began regular broadcasts on 1 January 1958 as Suomen Televisio, then the second television channel to operate in Finland. When Yleisradio took over the Tampere-based Tamvisio in 1964, Suomen Televisio was renamed TV-ohjelma 1, and Tamvisio became TV-ohjelma 2, and when they started broadcasting in colour in the 1970s, they were rebranded again, as TV1 and TV2.

In January 1970, it was made available in Åland.

== Logos and identities ==
Yle TV1 logo bug from 2005 to 2007

Yle TV1's seventh and previous logo used from April 2007 to 4 March 2012

Yle TV1's eighth and current logo since 5 March 2012

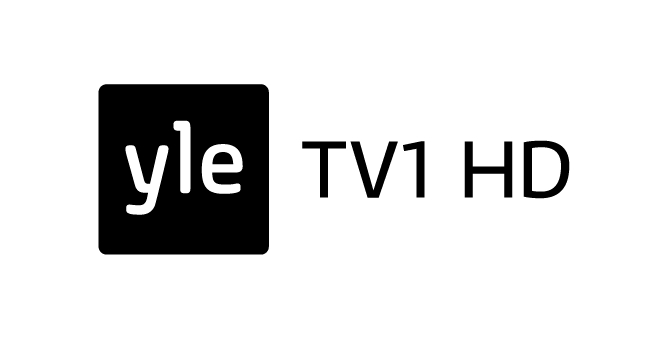
HD logo since 2012

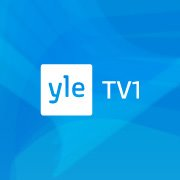
Alternate design of the current logo

== Notable programming ==
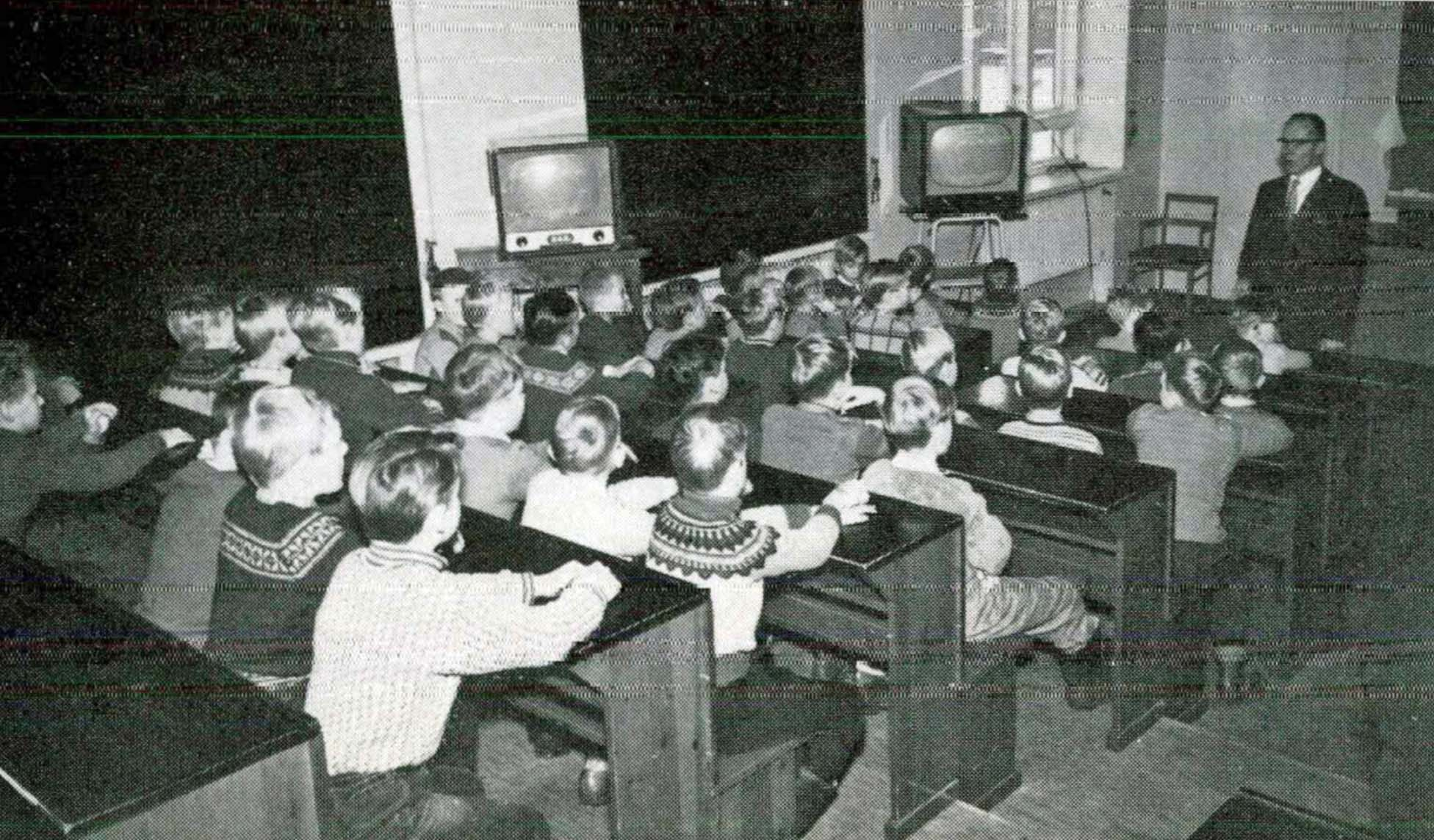
Experimenting with using television in education at Lapinlahti primary school in Helsinki, 1957

- Arto Nyberg
- Sorjonen
- Puoli Seitsemän (talk show)
- Uutisvuoto
- Urheiluruutu (sport news)
- Ylen aamu (breakfast television)
- Yle Uutiset (Yle News)
- A Studio
- Strömsö (Finland Swedish cooking show)
- Ođđasat (Northern Sami newscasts, with both Finland-specific and all-Nordic versions airing)
- Uuden Musiikin Kilpailu UMK (National Finnish Eurovision selection)

=== Imports ===
- (United Kingdom) A Good Girl's Guide to Murder
- (Australia) Black Snow
- (United Kingdom) Blue Lights
- (United Kingdom) Black Ops
- (United Kingdom) Beyond Paradise
- (United Kingdom) Domino Day
- (United Kingdom) Champion
- (Republic of Ireland) (New Zealand) The Gone
- (Republic of Ireland) Kin
- (France) (United Kingdom) Marie Antoinette
- (Scotland) Rebus
- (United States) Reasonable Doubt
- (United Kingdom) SAS: Rogue Heroes
- (United Kingdom) Scrublands
- (United Kingdom) Shakespeare & Hathaway: Private Investigators
- (United Kingdom) Silent Witness
- (France) Savages
- (United Kingdom) (Australia) Ten Pound Poms
- (United Kingdom) The Capture
- (United Kingdom) The Rig
- (France) (United Kingdom) The Tunnel
- (United Kingdom) We Hunt Together

=== Discontinued imports ===
- (Norway) Fleksnes
- (Norway) Brødrene Dal
- (Norway) Borettslaget

=== Previous imports ===
- (Australia) 800 Words
- (United States) 13 Reasons Why
- (Sweden) ABBA The Music Hour
- (United Kingdom) Agatha Christie's Marple
- (United Kingdom) Agatha Christie's Poirot
- (Australia) A Place to Call Home
- (Sweden) Anxious People
- (United Kingdom) Better
- (United States) Blue Bloods
- (Denmark) Bedrag
- (United Kingdom) Bloodlands
- (Germany) Biohackers
- (United Kingdom) Baptiste
- (United Kingdom) Call the Midwife
- (United Kingdom) Coronation Street
- (United Kingdom) Coronation Street
- (United Kingdom) DCI Banks
- (United Kingdom) Death in Paradise
- (United Kingdom) Doctor Foster
- (United States) Dawson's Creek
- (United Kingdom) Doc Martin
- (United Kingdom) Father Brown
- (Israel) Fauda
- (United Kingdom) Happy Valley
- (United Kingdom) Harlos
- (United Kingdom) Heartbeat
- (United States) House of Cards
- (United Kingdom) Inspector George Gently
- (United Kingdom) Luther
- (France) (United Kingdom) Liaison
- (France) Lupin
- (United Kingdom) Line of Duty
- (United Kingdom) Midsomer Murders
- (Canada) Murdoch Mysteries
- (United Kingdom) Moving On
- (France) Marseille
- (United States) Ozark
- (United Kingdom) Our Girl
- (United Kingdom) Peaky Blindes
- (Scotland) Shetland
- (Denmark) (Sweden) The Bridge
- (United Kingdom) The Fall
- (France) The Returned
- (United Kingdom) The Royal
- (United States) Tell Me Your Secrets
- (United Kingdom) Time
- (France) The Bureau
- (United States) The Calling
- (United States) The Blacklist
- (Italy) (Spain) (France) The Young Pope
- (France) (United Kingdom) Versailles
- (United Kingdom) Waterloo Road
- (France) (United Kingdom) War of the Worlds
- (United Kingdom) World on Fire
- (United Kingdom) Wreck

=== Cartoons ===
- Koulu-TV (School TV)
- The Little Mole
- Bannertail: The Story of Gray Squirrel (TV series)
- Dogtanian and the Three Muskehounds
- Maya the Honey Bee
- Fushigi no Kuni no Alice
- Taotao (TV series)
- The Wonderful Adventures of Nils (TV series)
- Doctor Snuggles
- Sherlock Hound
- Once Upon a Time... Man
- Once Upon a Time... Life
- The Snowman (moved to Yle TV2 in the 1990s)
- Around the World with Willy Fog (broadcast in 1990–1991, when Yleisradio dubbed the series in Finnish)
- Willy Fog 2
- The Return of Dogtanian
