= Yle Fem =

Television channel

- Logo used since 2012-2017
- Country: Finland
- Broadcast area: Finland

Programming
- Language: Swedish
- Picture format: 1080i HDTV (downscaled to 16:9 576i for the SDTV feed)

Ownership
- Owner: Yle
- Sister channels: Yle Fem HD; Yle TV1; Yle TV2; Yle Teema; Yle TV1 HD; Yle TV2 HD; Yle Teema HD

History
- Launched: 27 August 2001
- Closed: 24 April 2017
- Replaced by: Yle Teema & Fem
- Former names: Finlands Svenska Television (1988–2001); YLE FST (August 2001 – August 2006); YLE FST5 (August 2006 – March 2012)

Links
- Website: svenska.yle.fi/fem

Availability

Terrestrial
- Digital terrestrial television: Channel 5 (SD); Channel 35 (HD)

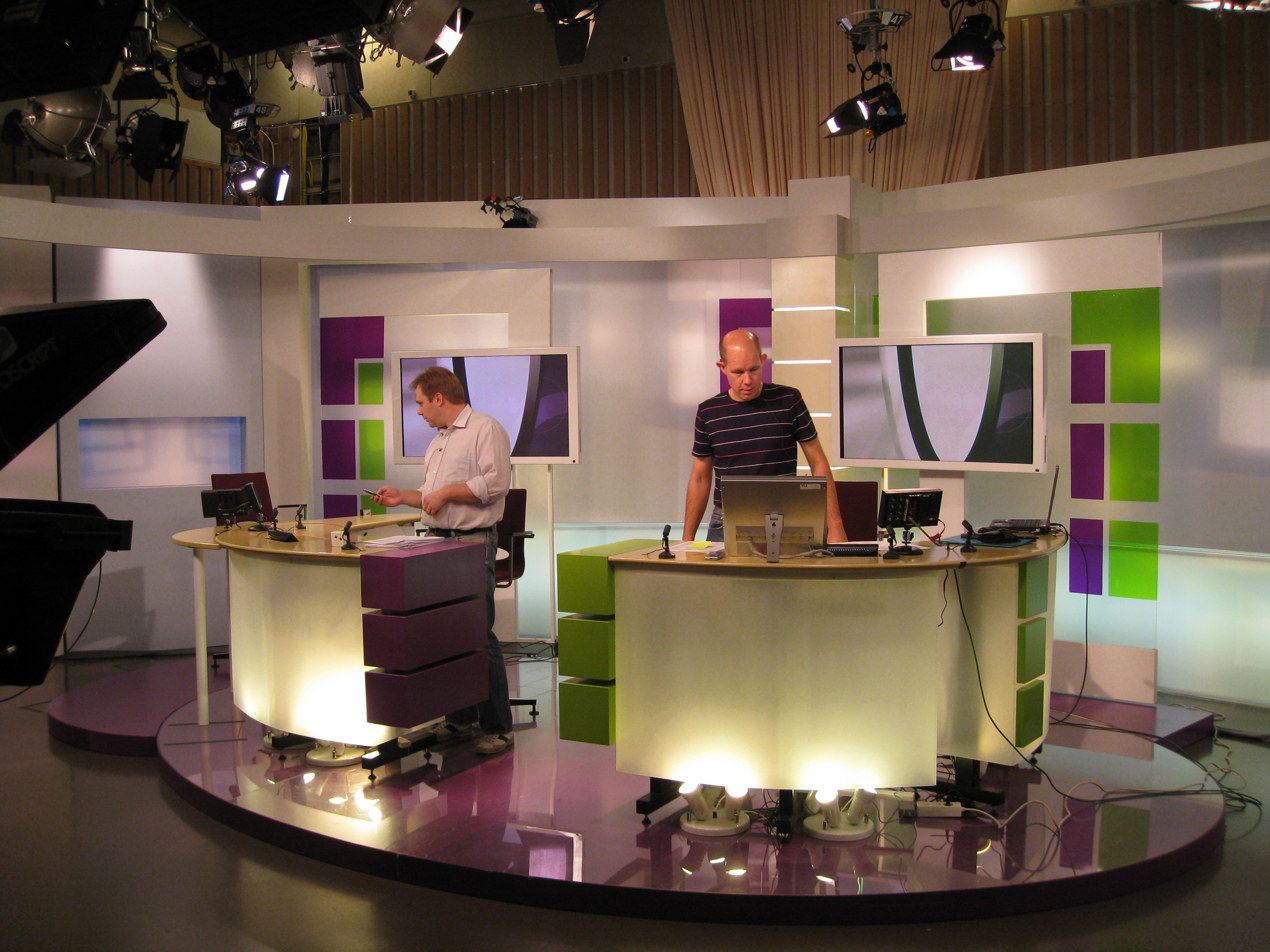
Kaj Kunnas in YLE fst5 news studio 2008

Yle Fem (Yle Five) was Yle's Finland-Swedish national television channel, providing television programmes in the Swedish language in Finland. It was a public-service channel principally intended for Finland's Swedish-speaking minority. Creating understanding over the language and culture border was also one of the channel's recognized objectives.

== History ==
A third channel was originally mooted in the early 1970s to cater to the Swedish population of Finland, but it was rejected as critics thought that a joint Finnish-Swedish channel would be unrealistic and that such channel would isolate Finland from its national language. A further petition was made in 1975 for such a service, but was later replaced in 1977 by an assessment plan to allocate airtime for programming in the language on the existing Yle television channels. Yle had been producing programmes in Swedish since 1959, initially with a weekly half-hour programme; by 1964 it produced the news magazine Sju dagar (Seven Days) and added Swedish-language news bulletins in 1965. That year, such programming aired on the newly-launched second channel. This eventually evolved into a dedicated unit in 1983, which did not gain its own identity until 1988.

Yle Fem was launched in 1988 as a late-evening programming block called FST (Finlands Svenska Television, literally "Finland's Swedish Television") which was broadcast on Monday nights on Yle TV2 and on Tuesday nights on Yle TV1, after the conclusion of MTV3's Kymmenen Uutiset (10pm evening news) on either channel. It was relaunched as its own dedicated channel called YLE FST on 27 August 2001, consequently the amount of airtime given for Swedish-language programming doubled from twenty to forty hours a week as a direct result of its launch. In December 2002, it launched its NE quiz game using its MHP capacity during its daytime downtime. In 2003, FST (as both a unit and a channel) carried 2,000 hours of programming, up from 950 in 2000.

It was called YLE FST5 from 2006 to 2012, but the name was changed because the viewers thought the name FST was only a combination of letters (Fem is Swedish for five, its LCN). Initially, Finlands Svenska Television's output was formerly included in the programming of Yle's two main television channels, TV1 and TV2. Yle Fem and Yle Teema were merged into one network on 24 April 2017, as Yle Teema & Fem.

== Logos and identities ==
Old logo, used until 2007

Old logo, used 2007-2012

== See also ==
- List of Finnish television channels
