= Yle TV2 =

Finnish television channel

- Logo used since 2012
- Country: Finland
- Broadcast area: Nationwide
- Headquarters: Ristimäki, Tampere

Programming
- Languages: Finnish; Swedish; Karelian; Sámi
- Picture format: 1080i HDTV

Ownership
- Owner: Yle
- Sister channels: Yle TV1; Yle Teema & Fem

History
- Launched: 7 March 1965
- Former names: TV-ohjelma 2 (1965–1971); TV2 (1971–1992)

Links
- Website: tv2.yle.fi

Availability

Terrestrial
- Digital terrestrial: Channel 2 (HD)

Streaming media
- Yle Areena: Watch live

Yle TV2 (Finnish: Yle TV Kaksi; Swedish: Yle TV Två) is a Finnish television channel owned and operated by Yle. TV2 was launched in 1965 as the successor to the former television channels TES-TV (Tesvisio) and Tamvisio and broadcasts public service programming, sports, drama, children's, youth, and music programmes. With Yle TV1, it is one of the three main television channels of Yle.

An HD simulcast of Yle TV2 began broadcasting in January 2014.

== History ==
Kakkoskanava, or TV Programme 2, originated with the purchase of Tesvisio by Yleisradio in 1964, which was unable to compete with Yle's Suomen Television for viewers and with Mainostelevision for advertising revenue and was running into bankruptcy. A few weeks later, Yle also bought Tamvision in Tampere. The deal, considered overpriced, weakened Yle's finances for a long time. Finland was the first in the Nordic countries to have a second television channel, while in Sweden, SVT2 (then TV2) did not start until four years later, in December 1969. In Norway and Denmark, only one channel remained until the mid-1980s and 1990s. TV2's reach gradually extended throughout Finland, and it was not until the late 1980s that the channel reached the entire Finnish population.

=== 1964-1975: Operation to Tampere, management to the Coalition Party ===
TV2's first manager was docent Helge Miettunen, who favoured locating the channel in Helsinki. However, because of regional policy, the Board of Directors of Yle decided to locate the station in Tampere. In terms of party politics, TV2 was initially under the mandate of the National Coalition Party, whose alternatives for the management of the channel were TV and radio personality Niilo Tarvajärvi and film director and set designer Hannu Leminen, who was then elected. The channel was running at a loss of ten million markka a year. In 1967, the director-general of Yle, Eino S. Repo, proposed that the production units of the two television channels should be separated from their channels so they could produce programmes for both channels. The proposal was narrowly defeated by the board of directors of Yle. The future of Channel Two was unclear until 1969, when, after the threat of closure, the YLE Board finally decided to expand the channel's transmission network.

== Logos and identities ==
Yle TV2 logo bug from 2005 to 2007

Yle TV2's tenth and previous logo used from May 2007 to 4 March 2012

Yle TV2's eleventh and current logo since 5 March 2012

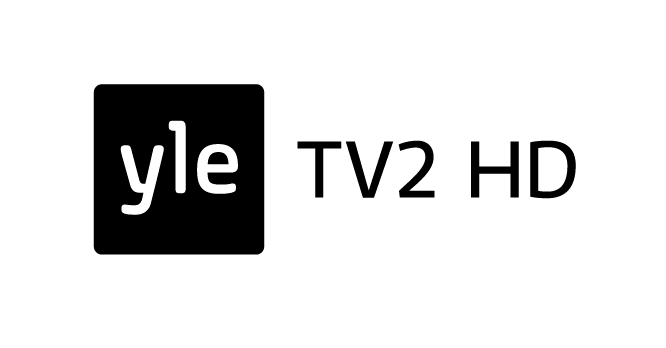
HD logo since 2012

== See also ==
- Pikku Kakkonen – Finnish children's TV show
- SVT2 – Swedish public TV channel
- Operaatio Hurrikaani
