= Geassájávri =

Lake in Tana, Norway

Geassájávri (Northern Sami); Kesänki (Kven); Store Sommervann (Norwegian)
- Store Sommervannet (historic name)
- Interactive map of the lake
- Location: Finnmark
- Coordinates: 70.2974°N 27.7447°E
- Basin countries: Norway
- Max. length: 7.4 kilometres (4.6 mi)
- Max. width: 1.1 kilometres (0.68 mi)
- Surface area: 5.66 km^{2} (2.19 sq mi)
- Shore length^{1}: 20 kilometres (12 mi)
- Surface elevation: 209 metres (686 ft)
- References: NVE
- ^{1} Shore length is not a well-defined measure.

Geassájávri (Northern Sami), Kesänki (Kven), or Store Sommervann (Norwegian) is a lake in Deatnu-Tana Municipality in Finnmark county, Norway. The 5.66-square-kilometre (2.19 sq mi) lake lies about 20 kilometres (12 mi) northwest of the village of Tana bru and the Tana River.

== See also ==
- List of lakes in Norway
