= Austertana =

Austertana: Austertana (Norwegian); Juovlavuotna (Northern Sami); Jouluvuono (Kven)
- Village
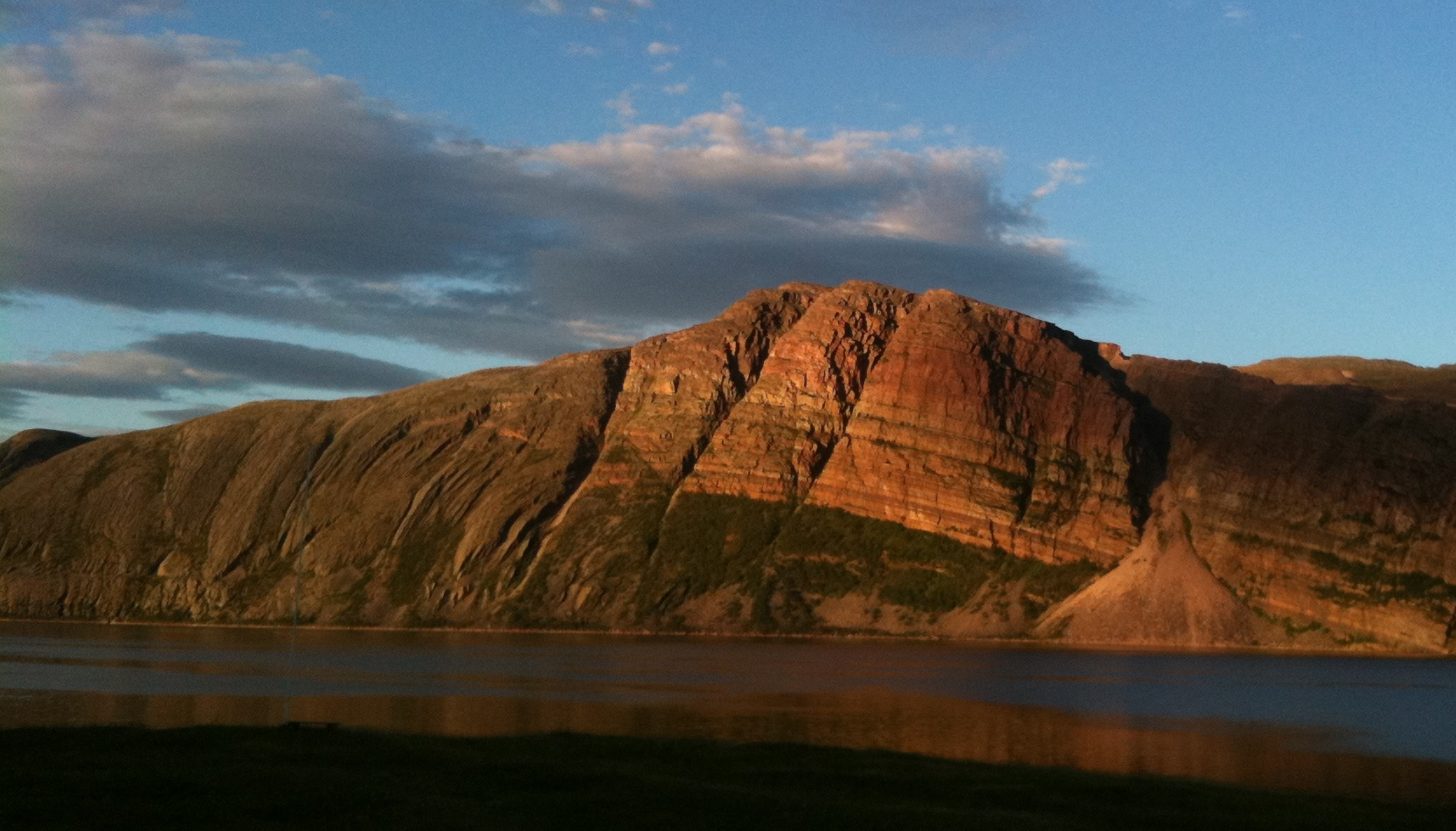
- Interactive map of Austertana
- Location within Finnmark Location within Norway
- Coordinates: 70°26′18″N 28°30′38″E
- Country: Norway
- Region: Northern Norway
- County: Finnmark
- District: Øst-Finnmark
- Municipality: Deatnu-Tana
- Elevation: 16 m (52 ft)
- Time zone: UTC+01:00 (CET)
  - Summer (DST): UTC+02:00 (CEST)
- Post Code: 9845 Tana

Austertana (Norwegian), Juovlavuotna (Northern Sami), or Jouluvuono (Kven) is a village in Deatnu-Tana Municipality in Finnmark county, Norway. The village is located along one of the inner bays of the large Tanafjorden, east of Rustefjelbma in northeastern Tana. The village is home to the Austertana Chapel. Austertana has the world's second largest quartzite quarry.

The Norwegian County Road 890 runs through the village. That road is the only road access to Båtsfjord Municipality and Berlevåg Municipality to the northeast on the Varanger Peninsula.
