= Per Fokstad =

Sami politician (1890–1973)

Per Fokstad (3 September 1890 – 10 December 1973) was a teacher, politician, and intellectual of Sami origin from Norway, and a pioneer in the fight for the use of the Sami languages in Norwegian schools.

Fokstad was born in Deatnu-Tana, Finnmark. His parents were yard workers in Bonakas in Tana. The language used in the family's household was Sami, and Per, who was the youngest of five, didn't know Norwegian when he began school. He started school as a 19-year-old at Tromsø's teacher college, and took his examination there in 1912. The same fall, he began as a teacher at Norskholmen skole in his home Deatnu-Tana Municipality. In the following ten years, he would take a leave of absence for further studies, three of the times in countries other than Norway.

For the 1915-1916 school year, he studied at Askov Folk High School in Denmark. In the fall of 1917, he studied the violin in Oslo. From 1919 to 1920, he studied at Woodbrooke College in Birmingham, England. The year after, he was at the Institut du pantheon de France in Paris, where he first discovered Henri Bergsons philosophy.

Even in his first published article in 1917, he was fighting for Sami language training in schools. At a conference in 1919 he was the architect behind a resolution that required:

1. That the Sami language should be studied for the first three school years.
2. That all teaching about Sami religion should be done in the Sami language.
3. Introducing Norwegian as a foreign language.

He followed up the idea with an article in 1923, and with a detailed report on The parliamentarian school commission (1923–1926). In 1937, together with headmaster M. Bremer, a «cultural institute for the Sami».
