= Skiippagurra =

- Village
- Interactive map of Skiippagurra
- Location within Finnmark Location within Norway
- Coordinates: 70°09′58″N 28°13′29″E
- Country: Norway
- Region: Northern Norway
- County: Finnmark
- District: Øst-Finnmark
- Municipality: Deatnu-Tana
- Elevation: 34 m (112 ft)
- Time zone: UTC+01:00 (CET)
  - Summer (DST): UTC+02:00 (CEST)
- Post Code: 9845 Tana

Skiippagurra is a village in Deatnu-Tana Municipality in Finnmark county, Norway. The village is located on the east bank of the Tana River, approximately 4 kilometres (2.5 mi) south of the municipal centre, Tana bru. According to Statistics Norway, the village had 254 residents in 2008. Skiippagurra is a trading place in Tana municipality. The trading post is located on the east bank of the river, about 4 kilometres (2.5 mi) south of Deanu šaldi.

Skiippagurra is the end point for river traffic on the Tana River to Karasjok. The European route E6 and European route E75 highways pass the village, which has 254 inhabitants (2008). From here, highway 895 leads southwest to the village of Buolbmát (Polmak). Skiippagurra is a checkpoint during the Finnmark race.

The Norwegian road museum is closed (as of 2023).

Since 2003, the village was home to an annual festival (until 2011) bearing its name.
