= Rustefjelbma =

Rustefjelbma (Norwegian); Ruostefielbmá (Northern Sami); Ruostefjelma (Kven)
- Village
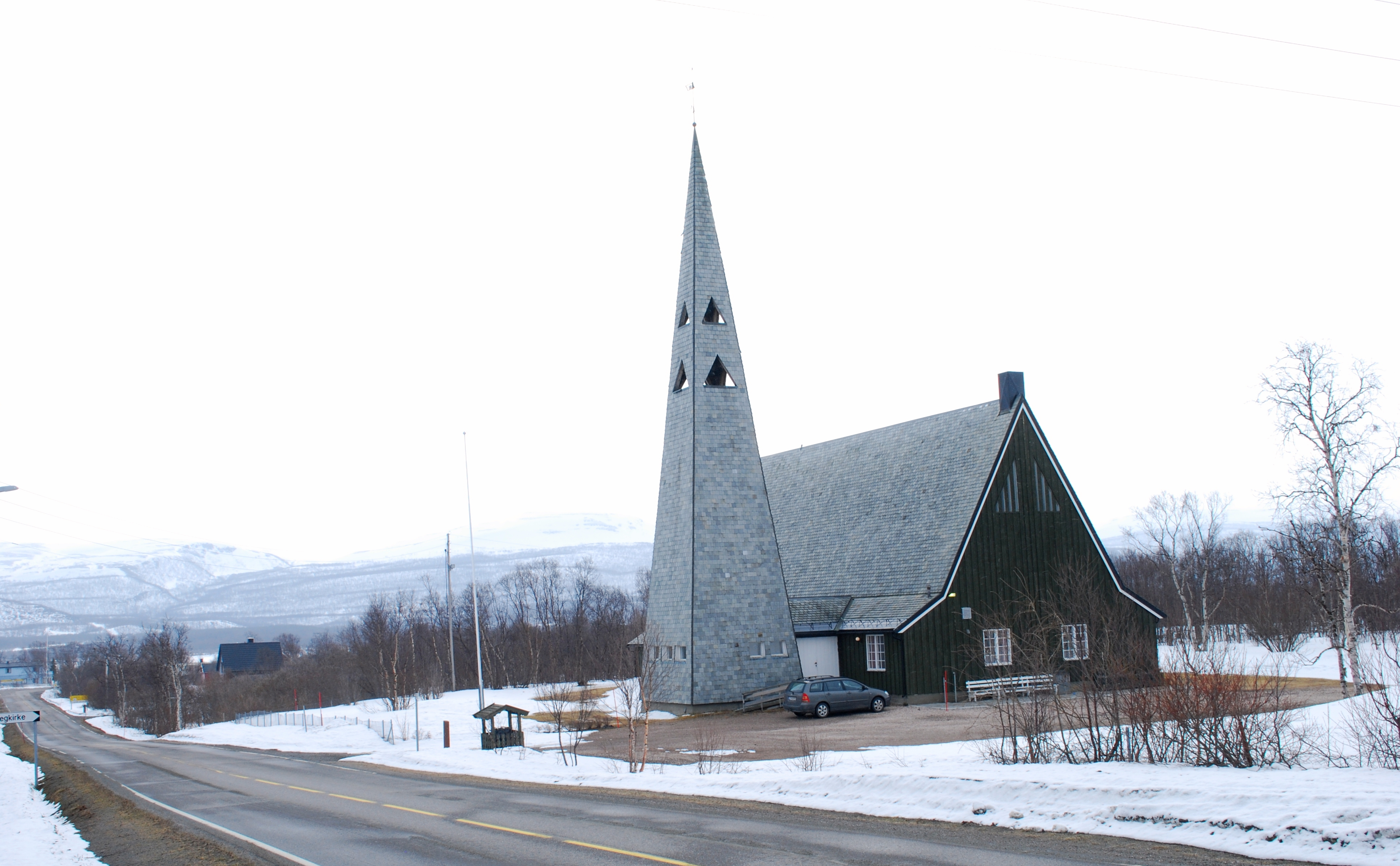
- Interactive map of: Rustefjelbma (Norwegian); Ruostefielbmá (Northern Sami); Ruostefjelma (Kven)
- Location within Finnmark Location within Norway
- Coordinates: 70°23′55″N 28°11′36″E
- Country: Norway
- Region: Northern Norway
- County: Finnmark
- District: Øst-Finnmark
- Municipality: Deatnu-Tana
- Elevation: 7 m (23 ft)
- Time zone: UTC+01:00 (CET)
  - Summer (DST): UTC+02:00 (CEST)
- Post Code: 9845 Tana

Rustefjelbma (Norwegian), Ruostefielbmá (Northern Sami), or Ruostefjelma (Kven) is a village in Deatnu-Tana Municipality in Finnmark county, Norway. The village is located along the Tana River, about 15 kilometres (9.3 mi) south of the mouth of the river at the Tanafjorden. The village of Bonakas lies just north of Rustefjelbma.

The municipal centre of Tana bru lies about 25 kilometres (16 mi) to the south. Rustefjelbma is the location of Tana Church. During the winter months, there is an ice road that crosses the Tana River at Rustefjelbma.

== Climate ==
Rustefjelbma has a subarctic climate (Köppen Dfc).

Climate data for Rustefjelbma 1991-2020 (10 m)
Month	Jan	Feb	Mar	Apr	May	Jun	Jul	Aug	Sep	Oct	Nov	Dec	Year
Daily mean °C (°F)	−10.4 (13.3)	−10.1 (13.8)	−5.9 (21.4)	−0.9 (30.4)	4.4 (39.9)	9.1 (48.4)	12.8 (55.0)	11.4 (52.5)	7.2 (45.0)	0.9 (33.6)	−5.2 (22.6)	−7.7 (18.1)	0.5 (32.8)
Average precipitation mm (inches)	38.8 (1.53)	35.6 (1.40)	35.9 (1.41)	26.9 (1.06)	29.3 (1.15)	47.3 (1.86)	63 (2.5)	59.7 (2.35)	47 (1.9)	53.4 (2.10)	35.9 (1.41)	42.2 (1.66)	515 (20.33)
Source: NOAA

Climate data for Rustefjelbma (1981–2010 normals)
Month	Jan	Feb	Mar	Apr	May	Jun	Jul	Aug	Sep	Oct	Nov	Dec	Year
Mean daily maximum °C (°F)	−6.6 (20.1)	−6.0 (21.2)	−2.4 (27.7)	2.0 (35.6)	6.7 (44.1)	12.4 (54.3)	16.4 (61.5)	14.5 (58.1)	9.7 (49.5)	3.4 (38.1)	−2.4 (27.7)	−4.9 (23.2)	3.6 (38.4)
Daily mean °C (°F)	−11.5 (11.3)	−11.0 (12.2)	−7.4 (18.7)	−2.2 (28.0)	3.4 (38.1)	8.6 (47.5)	12.2 (54.0)	10.3 (50.5)	6.0 (42.8)	0.3 (32.5)	−6.5 (20.3)	−9.7 (14.5)	−0.6 (30.9)
Mean daily minimum °C (°F)	−16.5 (2.3)	−16.0 (3.2)	−12.3 (9.9)	−6.4 (20.5)	0.1 (32.2)	4.8 (40.6)	7.9 (46.2)	6.1 (43.0)	2.2 (36.0)	−2.7 (27.1)	−10.6 (12.9)	−14.5 (5.9)	−4.8 (23.3)
Average precipitation mm (inches)	41.2 (1.62)	36.0 (1.42)	28.2 (1.11)	27.0 (1.06)	25.7 (1.01)	39.4 (1.55)	62.5 (2.46)	52.8 (2.08)	44.7 (1.76)	56.6 (2.23)	37.1 (1.46)	42.4 (1.67)	493.6 (19.43)
Average precipitation days	11.6	10.8	8.8	7.6	7.2	8.3	10.0	9.9	11.2	14.2	10.2	12.2	122
