= Tana Municipality =

Municipality in Finnmark, Norway

Tana Municipality Tana kommune Deanu gielda
- Municipality
- Tanen herred (historic name)
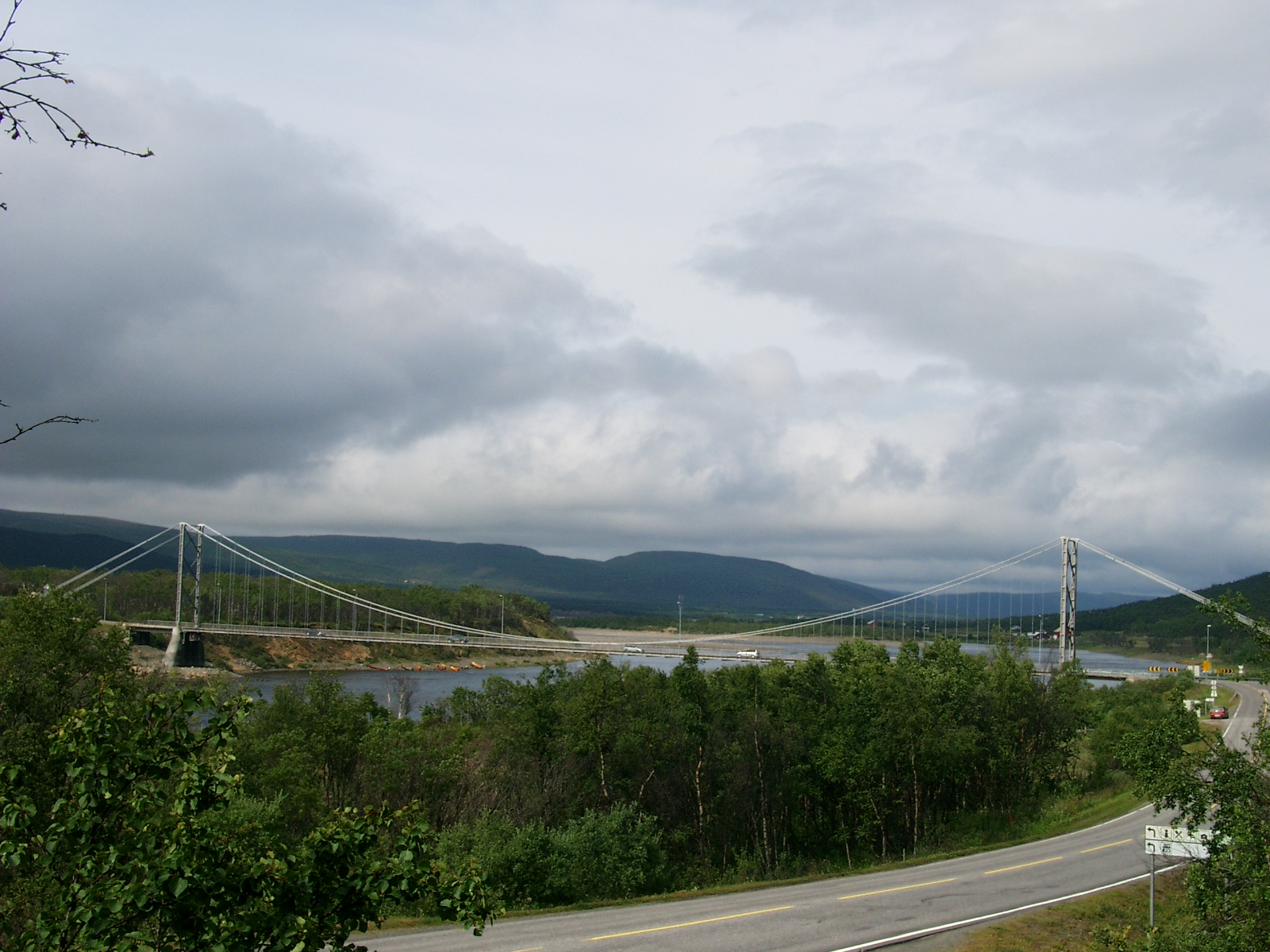
- View of the old bridge that spanned the river Tanaelva. A new bridge has replaced it. The river banks on the right side of the photo, are part of the Varanger Peninsula.

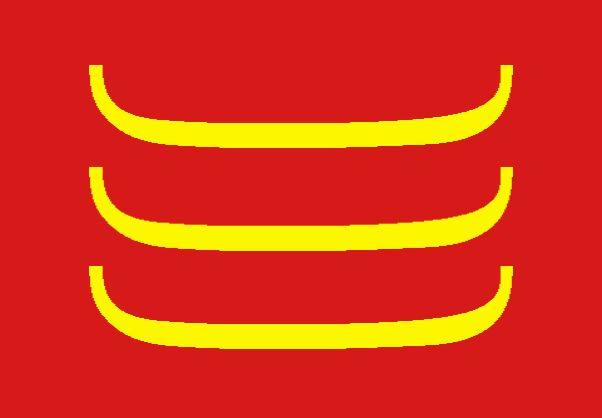
- Flag Coat of arms

- Finnmark within Norway

- Tana within Finnmark
- Coordinates: 70°11′58″N 28°11′09″E
- Country: Norway
- County: Finnmark
- District: Øst-Finnmark
- Established: 1 Jan 1864
  - Preceded by: Lebesby Municipality
- Administrative centre: Tana bru

Government
  - Mayor (2023): Jon Erland Balto (Sp)

Area
  - Total: 4,051.28 km^{2} (1,564.21 sq mi)
  - Land: 3,832.70 km^{2} (1,479.81 sq mi)
  - Water: 218.58 km^{2} (84.39 sq mi) 5.4%
  - Rank: #5 in Norway
- Highest elevation: 1,066.8 m (3,500 ft)

Population (2024)
  - Total: 2,807
  - Rank: #239 in Norway
  - Density: 0.7/km^{2} (1.8/sq mi)
  - Change (10 years): ▼ −2.6%
- Demonym: Tanaværing

Official languages
  - Norwegian form: Bokmål
  - Sámi form: Northern Sami
- Time zone: UTC+01:00 (CET)
  - Summer (DST): UTC+02:00 (CEST)
- ISO 3166 code: NO-5628
- Website: Official website

Deatnu (Northern Sami) or Tana (Norwegian) is a municipality in Finnmark county, Norway. The administrative centre of the municipality is the village of Tana bru. Among the other villages in the municipality are Austertana, Bonakas, Polmak, Rustefjelbma, and Skiippagurra.

The 4,051-square-kilometre (1,564 sq mi) municipality is the 5th largest by area out of the 357 municipalities in Norway. Deanu-Tana is the 239th most populous municipality in Norway with a population of 2,807. The municipality's population density is 0.7 inhabitants per square kilometre (1.8/sq mi) and its population has decreased by 2.6% over the previous 10-year period.

== History ==
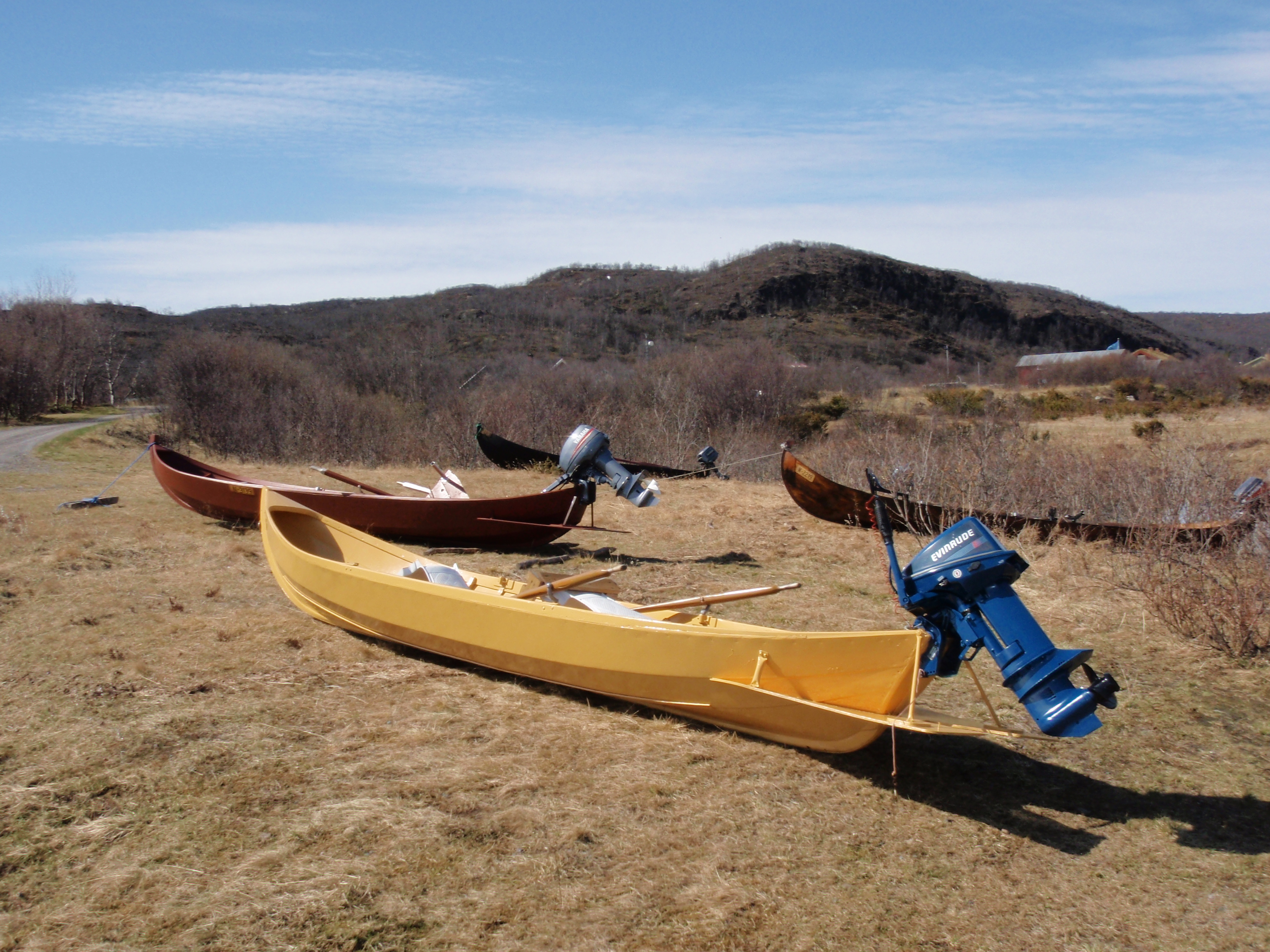
View of the local river boats

On 1 January 1864, the large Lebesby Municipality was divided into two. The eastern part (population: 1,388) became the new Tane Municipality and the rest remained as Lebesby. Initially, Tana Municipality included all the land on both sides surrounding the Tanafjorden and the Tana River.

On 1 January 1914, the municipality of Tana was divided into three parts. The southern part (population: 1,426) remained as (a smaller) Tana Municipality. The northern part of the municipality was divided by the Tanafjorden with the western side becoming Gamvik Municipality (population: 1,374) and the eastern side becoming Berlevåg Municipality (population: 784). On 1 January 1964, the neighboring Polmak Municipality (population: 1,072) was merged into Tana. (Polmak was originally part of Nesseby Municipality before 1 January 1903 when it became a separate municipality.)

Tana Municipality marks the furthest Soviet advance into Nazi-occupied Norway.

On 1 January 2020, the municipality became part of the newly formed Troms og Finnmark county. Previously, it had been part of the old Finnmark county. On 1 January 2024, the Troms og Finnmark county was divided and the municipality once again became part of Finnmark county.

=== Name ===
The municipality (originally the parish) was originally named Tanen, a Norwegianized form of the Northern Sami name for the area, Deanu. The Sami name is identical to the genitive case of Sami word deatnu which means "great river" or "large river", referring to the main river (Tana River) which runs through the municipality. Historically, the name of the municipality was spelled Tanen. On 3 November 1917, a royal resolution changed the spelling of the name of the municipality to Tana.

On 1 September 1992, the name of the municipality was changed to "Deatnu-Tana" to symbolize the two official languages in the municipality. Then in 2005, the name was again changed such that either Deatnu or Tana can be used. The Sami language name spelling changes depending on how it is used. It is called Deatnu when it is spelled alone, but it is Deanu gielda when using the Sami language equivalent to "Deanu municipality".

=== Coat of arms ===
The coat of arms was granted on 11 May 1984. The official blazon is "Gules, three boats Or in pale" (Norwegian: I rødt tre gule båter). This means the arms have a red field (background) and the charge is three riverboats. The riverboat has a tincture of Or which means it is commonly colored yellow, but if it is made out of metal, then gold is used. The red and yellow colors in the arms were chosen to mimic the Norwegian national arms. The three riverboats were chosen because boats like this have been used in the area for centuries. There are three boats to symbolize the three ethnic groups in the border municipality: the Sámi, Kvens, and Norwegians. The arms were designed by Arvid Sveen.

== Economy ==
In 2013, 29% of the work force was employed in retail, hotels/restaurants and finance; 23% in the healthcare industry and the social sector; 16% in the Secondary sector of the economy; 11% in the primary sector; 9% worked in the education sector; the work force totaled 1,401.

The most important [economic] resources are farmland and [coastal areas, mountains and forests or] utmark; the use of these gives [significant results relating to] agriculture.

The world's northernmost dairy is Tine Tana, and it employs around 30 people.

The Tana Valley is the core area for "the River-Sami Culture" in Finnmark; salmon fishing is central in regard to that culture. According to written sources since the 17th century, fishing has been a major livelihood for the Sami people in the river valley of Tana River.

== Churches ==
The Church of Norway has two parishes (sokn) within Tana Municipality. It is part of the Indre Finnmark prosti (deanery) in the Diocese of Nord-Hålogaland.

Churches in Tana Municipality
Parish (sokn)	Church name	Location of the church	Year built
Tana	Austertana Chapel	Austertana	1958
Tana	Tana Church	Rustefjelbma	1964
Polmak	Polmak Church	Polmak	1853

== Government ==
Tana Municipality is responsible for primary education (through 10th grade), outpatient health services, senior citizen services, welfare and other social services, zoning, economic development, and municipal roads and utilities. The municipality is governed by a municipal council of directly elected representatives. The mayor is indirectly elected by a vote of the municipal council. The municipality is under the jurisdiction of the Indre og Østre Finnmark District Court and the Hålogaland Court of Appeal.

=== Municipal council ===
The municipal council (Kommunestyre) of Tana Municipality is made up of 19 representatives that are elected to four year terms. The tables below show the current and historical composition of the council by political party.

Deatnu Tana kommunestyre 2023–2027
Party name (in Norwegian)	Number of representatives
Labour Party (Arbeiderpartiet)	6
Progress Party (Fremskrittspartiet)	2
Conservative Party (Høyre)	3
Centre Party (Senterpartiet)	3
Liberal Party (Venstre)	2
Sami List in Tana (Deanu Sámelistu–Samelista i Tana)	3
Total number of members:	19

Deatnu Tana kommunestyre 2019–2023
Party name (in Norwegian)	Number of representatives
Labour Party (Arbeiderpartiet)	8
Progress Party (Fremskrittspartiet)	1
Conservative Party (Høyre)	1
Centre Party (Senterpartiet)	4
Socialist Left Party (Sosialistisk Venstreparti)	1
Liberal Party (Venstre)	2
Sami List in Tana (Deanu Sámelistu–Samelista i Tana)	2
Total number of members:	19

Deatnu Tana kommunestyre 2015–2019
Party name (in Norwegian)	Number of representatives
Labour Party (Arbeiderpartiet)	9
Progress Party (Fremskrittspartiet)	2
Conservative Party (Høyre)	1
Sámi People's Party (Samefolkets Parti)	1
Centre Party (Senterpartiet)	2
Socialist Left Party (Sosialistisk Venstreparti)	1
Liberal Party (Venstre)	1
Árja (Árja)	2
Total number of members:	19

Deatnu Tana kommunestyre 2011–2015
Party name (in Norwegian)	Number of representatives
Labour Party (Arbeiderpartiet)	9
Progress Party (Fremskrittspartiet)	1
Conservative Party (Høyre)	5
Sámi People's Party (Samefolkets Parti)	2
Centre Party (Senterpartiet)	3
Socialist Left Party (Sosialistisk Venstreparti)	1
Liberal Party (Venstre)	1
Local List(s) (Lokale lister)	1
Total number of members:	23

Deatnu Tana kommunestyre 2007–2011
Party name (in Norwegian)	Number of representatives
Labour Party (Arbeiderpartiet)	7
Progress Party (Fremskrittspartiet)	2
Conservative Party (Høyre)	2
Sámi People's Party (Samefolkets Parti)	1
Centre Party (Senterpartiet)	1
Socialist Left Party (Sosialistisk Venstreparti)	1
Joint list of the Liberal Party and Independent Voters (Venstre og uavhengige velgeres liste)	3
Total number of members:	17

Deatnu-Tana kommunestyre 2003–2007
Party name (in Norwegian)	Number of representatives
Labour Party (Arbeiderpartiet)	7
Progress Party (Fremskrittspartiet)	2
Conservative Party (Høyre)	2
Sámi People's Party (Samefolkets Parti)	1
Centre Party (Senterpartiet)	1
Joint list of the Liberal Party and Independent Voters (Venstre og uavhengige velgeres liste)	2
Tana Common List (Tana fellesliste)	2
Total number of members:	17

Deatnu-Tana kommunestyre 1999–2003
Party name (in Norwegian)	Number of representatives
Labour Party (Arbeiderpartiet)	9
Progress Party (Fremskrittspartiet)	7
Conservative Party (Høyre)	5
Christian Democratic Party (Kristelig Folkeparti)	1
Sámi People's Party (Samefolkets Parti)	2
Centre Party (Senterpartiet)	2
Liberal Party (Venstre)	1
Total number of members:	27

Deatnu-Tana kommunestyre 1995–1999
Party name (in Norwegian)	Number of representatives
Labour Party (Arbeiderpartiet)	10
Conservative Party (Høyre)	7
Christian Democratic Party (Kristelig Folkeparti)	1
Centre Party (Senterpartiet)	4
Socialist Left Party (Sosialistisk Venstreparti)	1
Liberal Party (Venstre)	1
Sámi Democrat (Samedemokrahtat/Samedemokrate)	1
Sámi List (Sámealbmot listu/Samefolkets liste)	2
Total number of members:	27

Deatnu-Tana kommunestyre 1991–1995
Party name (in Norwegian)	Number of representatives
Labour Party (Arbeiderpartiet)	8
Conservative Party (Høyre)	7
Christian Democratic Party (Kristelig Folkeparti)	1
Centre Party (Senterpartiet)	4
Socialist Left Party (Sosialistisk Venstreparti)	2
Liberal Party (Venstre)	1
Sámi Democrat (Samedemokrahtat/Samedemokrate)	1
Sámi List (Sámealbmot listu/Samefolkets liste)	3
Total number of members:	27

Tana kommunestyre 1987–1991
Party name (in Norwegian)	Number of representatives
Labour Party (Arbeiderpartiet)	10
Conservative Party (Høyre)	4
Christian Democratic Party (Kristelig Folkeparti)	1
Centre Party (Senterpartiet)	1
Socialist Left Party (Sosialistisk Venstreparti)	1
Liberal Party (Venstre)	1
Tana Cross-Party List (Tana tverrpolitiske liste)	3
Sámi List (Samefolkets liste)	3
Free Voters List (Frie Velgeres list)	3
Total number of members:	27

Tana kommunestyre 1983–1987
Party name (in Norwegian)	Number of representatives
Labour Party (Arbeiderpartiet)	11
Conservative Party (Høyre)	5
Christian Democratic Party (Kristelig Folkeparti)	1
Centre Party (Senterpartiet)	2
Socialist Left Party (Sosialistisk Venstreparti)	1
Tana Cross-Party List (Tana tverrpolitiske liste)	2
Sámi List (Samefolkets liste)	3
Free Voters List (Frie Velgeres list)	2
Total number of members:	27

Tana kommunestyre 1979–1983
Party name (in Norwegian)	Number of representatives
Labour Party (Arbeiderpartiet)	11
Conservative Party (Høyre)	6
Christian Democratic Party (Kristelig Folkeparti)	2
Centre Party (Senterpartiet)	4
Socialist Left Party (Sosialistisk Venstreparti)	1
Liberal Party (Venstre)	1
Village List (Bygdefolkets enhetsliste)	1
Sámi List (Samefolkets liste)	1
Total number of members:	27

Tana kommunestyre 1977–1979
Party name (in Norwegian)	Number of representatives
Labour Party (Arbeiderpartiet)	13
Conservative Party (Høyre)	4
Christian Democratic Party (Kristelig Folkeparti)	2
Centre Party (Senterpartiet)	6
Socialist Left Party (Sosialistisk Venstreparti)	2
Total number of members:	27

Tana kommunestyre 1971–1975
Party name (in Norwegian)	Number of representatives
Labour Party (Arbeiderpartiet)	15
Conservative Party (Høyre)	5
Christian Democratic Party (Kristelig Folkeparti)	2
Centre Party (Senterpartiet)	3
Socialist common list (Venstresosialistiske felleslister)	1
Total number of members:	27

Tana kommunestyre 1967–1971
Party name (in Norwegian)	Number of representatives
Labour Party (Arbeiderpartiet)	14
Conservative Party (Høyre)	5
Christian Democratic Party (Kristelig Folkeparti)	1
Centre Party (Senterpartiet)	4
Socialist People's Party (Sosialistisk Folkeparti)	1
List of workers, fishermen, and small farmholders (Arbeidere, fiskere, småbrukere liste)	2
Total number of members:	27

Tana kommunestyre 1963–1967
Party name (in Norwegian)	Number of representatives
Labour Party (Arbeiderpartiet)	15
Conservative Party (Høyre)	6
Communist Party (Kommunistiske Parti)	1
List of workers, fishermen, and small farmholders (Arbeidere, fiskere, småbrukere liste)	5
Total number of members:	27

Tana herredsstyre 1959–1963
Party name (in Norwegian)	Number of representatives
Labour Party (Arbeiderpartiet)	6
Conservative Party (Høyre)	3
Communist Party (Kommunistiske Parti)	2
List of workers, fishermen, and small farmholders (Arbeidere, fiskere, småbrukere liste)	6
Total number of members:	17

Tana herredsstyre 1955–1959
Party name (in Norwegian)	Number of representatives
Labour Party (Arbeiderpartiet)	6
Conservative Party (Høyre)	2
Communist Party (Kommunistiske Parti)	1
List of workers, fishermen, and small farmholders (Arbeidere, fiskere, småbrukere liste)	4
Total number of members:	13

Tana herredsstyre 1951–1955
Party name (in Norwegian)	Number of representatives
Labour Party (Arbeiderpartiet)	4
List of workers, fishermen, and small farmholders (Arbeidere, fiskere, småbrukere liste)	3
Joint List(s) of Non-Socialist Parties (Borgerlige Felleslister)	2
Local List(s) (Lokale lister)	3
Total number of members:	12

Tana herredsstyre 1947–1951
Party name (in Norwegian)	Number of representatives
Labour Party (Arbeiderpartiet)	4
List of workers, fishermen, and small farmholders (Arbeidere, fiskere, småbrukere liste)	5
Joint List(s) of Non-Socialist Parties (Borgerlige Felleslister)	3
Total number of members:	12

Tana herredsstyre 1945–1947
Party name (in Norwegian)	Number of representatives
Labour Party (Arbeiderpartiet)	4
List of workers, fishermen, and small farmholders (Arbeidere, fiskere, småbrukere liste)	5
Local List(s) (Lokale lister)	3
Total number of members:	12

Tana herredsstyre 1937–1941*
Party name (in Norwegian)	Number of representatives
Labour Party (Arbeiderpartiet)	5
Liberal Party (Venstre)	3
Joint list of the Conservative Party (Høyre) and the Free-minded People's Party (Frisinnede Folkeparti)	3
List of workers, fishermen, and small farmholders (Arbeidere, fiskere, småbrukere liste)	1
Total number of members:	12
Note: Due to the German occupation of Norway during World War II, no elections were held for new municipal councils until after the war ended in 1945.

=== Mayors ===
The mayor (Norwegian: ordfører) of Tana Municipality is the political leader of the municipality and the chairperson of the municipal council. Here is a list of people who have held this position:

- 1864–1869: Peter Larsen
- 1869–1876: N. Schanke
- 1877–1884: Hagbarth Johnsen
- 1885–1892: N. Hansen
- 1893–1895: P.C. Schanke
- 1896–1898: Christian Meidell
- 1899–1901: L.H. Schrøen
- 1902–1904: P.C. Schanke
- 1905–1907: N. Øwre
- 1908–1916: Hagbarth Lund (V)
- 1917–1917: E.M. Noodt
- 1918–1919: Hans Rasmussen (V)
- 1920–1922: H.A. Henriksen
- 1923–1924: Hans Rasmussen (V)
- 1925–1925: Alf Schanche
- 1926–1927: H.A. Henriksen
- 1928–1931: Hans Rasmussen (V)
- 1932–1937: L. Bjerkeng
- 1938–1940: Per Fokstad (Ap)
- 1941–1945: Barmann Jensen (NS)
- 1945–1948: Per Fokstad (Ap)
- 1948–1951: Kristian Rasmussen (LL)
- 1951–1961: Rolf L. Schancke (Ap)
- 1961–1964: Simon Pedersen (Ap)
- 1964–1965: Reidar Dybvik (Ap)
- 1965–1966: Simon Pedersen (Ap)
- 1966–1966: Ingolf Ellila (Ap)
- 1966–1968: Simon Pedersen (Ap)
- 1968–1971: Magnus Rokstad (Ap)
- 1971–1983: Stein Torheim (Ap)
- 1983–1987: Kristine Broch Johansen (Ap)
- 1987–1991: Harald Hirsti (Ap)
- 1991–1999: Leif Kristian Sundelin (Ap)
- 1999–2007: Ingrid Smuk Rolstad (Ap)
- 2007–2019: Frank Ingilæ (Ap)
- 2019–2023: Helga Pedersen (Ap)
- 2023–present: Jon Erland Balto (Sp)

== Geography ==
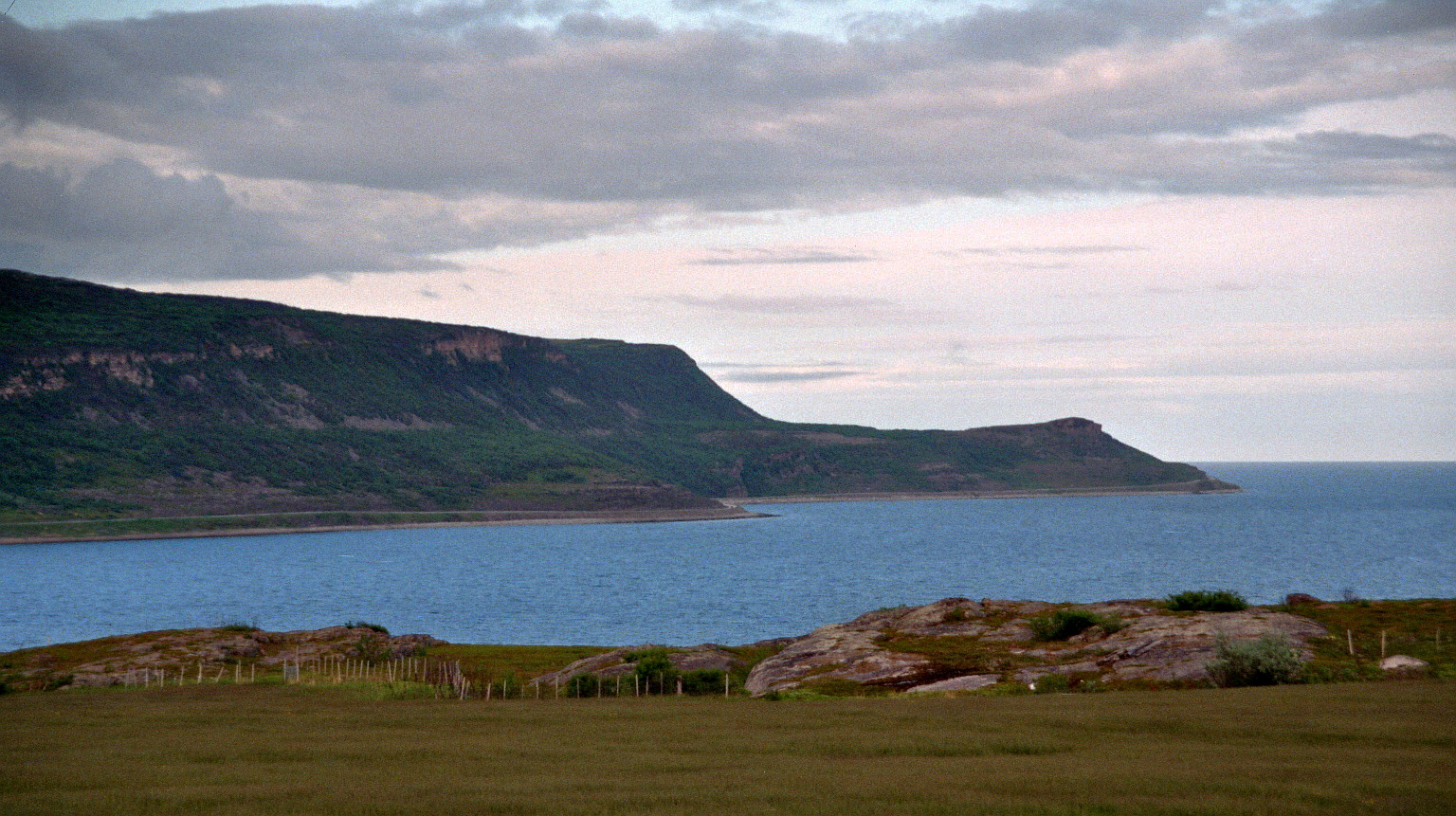
View of the Tanafjorden from the highway Fv 98

Deatnu-Tana is situated along the lower river basin of the Tana River, which borders Finland along most of its course. People live in small settlements along the river, notably Sirma, Polmak, Rustefjelbma, Seida, Skiippagurra, Austertana, and Tana bru. Most inhabitants of Tana are Sami people, and the Sami language and culture are today acknowledged and supported by the municipality and the schools. The highest point in the municipality is the 1,066.78-metre (3,499.9 ft) tall mountain Rásttigáisá.

The river Tana is economically important, as it is one of Europe's main salmon rivers, and it empties into the Tanafjorden. River transportation is traditionally done by long, narrow river boats, that are still in use, albeit motorized. Lakes in this area include Geassájávri, Nissojávri, and Sundvatnet. At Tana bru, the Tana Bridge (part of European route E6 and European route E75) crosses over the Tana River. The nearest airports are Vadsø Airport (about 70 kilometres or 43 miles away) and Kirkenes Airport (about 130 kilometres or 81 miles away). Kirkenes Airport (but not Vadsø) has direct flights to Oslo.

=== Wildlife ===
The Tana River's habitat is home to varied waterfowl. As many as 25,000 goosanders can alight along the Tana waterway system. With thousands of common eider and long-tailed duck, this area is home to one of the largest concentrations of wildfowl in Norway.

Larger mammals also roam along the Tana River. In 2022, a bear was killed after preying on sheep from a local farm. An investigation deemed the killing of the bear legal, as there likely had been at least one other bear in the municipality.

=== Climate ===
Tana has a subarctic climate (Dfc) with long, cold winters and short cool summers. The following climate normals are from Rustefjelbma, a weather station operating until 2013. This station was located approximately 23 km from Tana bru, where a new weather station has been put into operation.

Climate data for Rustefjelbma 1991-2020 (10 m)
Month	Jan	Feb	Mar	Apr	May	Jun	Jul	Aug	Sep	Oct	Nov	Dec	Year
Daily mean °C (°F)	−10.4 (13.3)	−10.1 (13.8)	−5.9 (21.4)	−0.9 (30.4)	4.4 (39.9)	9.1 (48.4)	12.8 (55.0)	11.4 (52.5)	7.2 (45.0)	0.9 (33.6)	−5.2 (22.6)	−7.7 (18.1)	0.5 (32.8)
Average precipitation mm (inches)	38.8 (1.53)	35.6 (1.40)	35.9 (1.41)	26.9 (1.06)	29.3 (1.15)	47.3 (1.86)	63 (2.5)	59.7 (2.35)	47 (1.9)	53.4 (2.10)	35.9 (1.41)	42.2 (1.66)	515 (20.33)
Source: NOAA

Climate data for Rustefjelbma 1961-1990 (10 m)
Month	Jan	Feb	Mar	Apr	May	Jun	Jul	Aug	Sep	Oct	Nov	Dec	Year
Mean daily maximum °C (°F)	−7.3 (18.9)	−7.0 (19.4)	−3.2 (26.2)	1.3 (34.3)	6.1 (43.0)	12.4 (54.3)	16.3 (61.3)	14.1 (57.4)	9.2 (48.6)	2.9 (37.2)	−2.3 (27.9)	−5.8 (21.6)	3.1 (37.6)
Daily mean °C (°F)	−12.2 (10.0)	−11.3 (11.7)	−7.4 (18.7)	−2.0 (28.4)	3.3 (37.9)	8.7 (47.7)	12.3 (54.1)	10.6 (51.1)	6.0 (42.8)	0.2 (32.4)	−6.0 (21.2)	−10.4 (13.3)	−0.7 (30.7)
Mean daily minimum °C (°F)	−18.2 (−0.8)	−17.4 (0.7)	−13.6 (7.5)	−7.2 (19.0)	−0.6 (30.9)	4.7 (40.5)	7.5 (45.5)	5.8 (42.4)	1.8 (35.2)	−3.5 (25.7)	−10.8 (12.6)	−16.2 (2.8)	−5.6 (21.9)
Average precipitation mm (inches)	39 (1.5)	32 (1.3)	26 (1.0)	24 (0.9)	22 (0.9)	35 (1.4)	54 (2.1)	48 (1.9)	46 (1.8)	49 (1.9)	39 (1.5)	41 (1.6)	455 (17.9)
Average precipitation days (≥ 1 mm)	11.2	8.5	7.6	6.7	5.8	8.4	9.5	9.9	11.0	12.3	10.4	11.1	112.4
Source: Norwegian Meteorological Institute

== Notable people ==
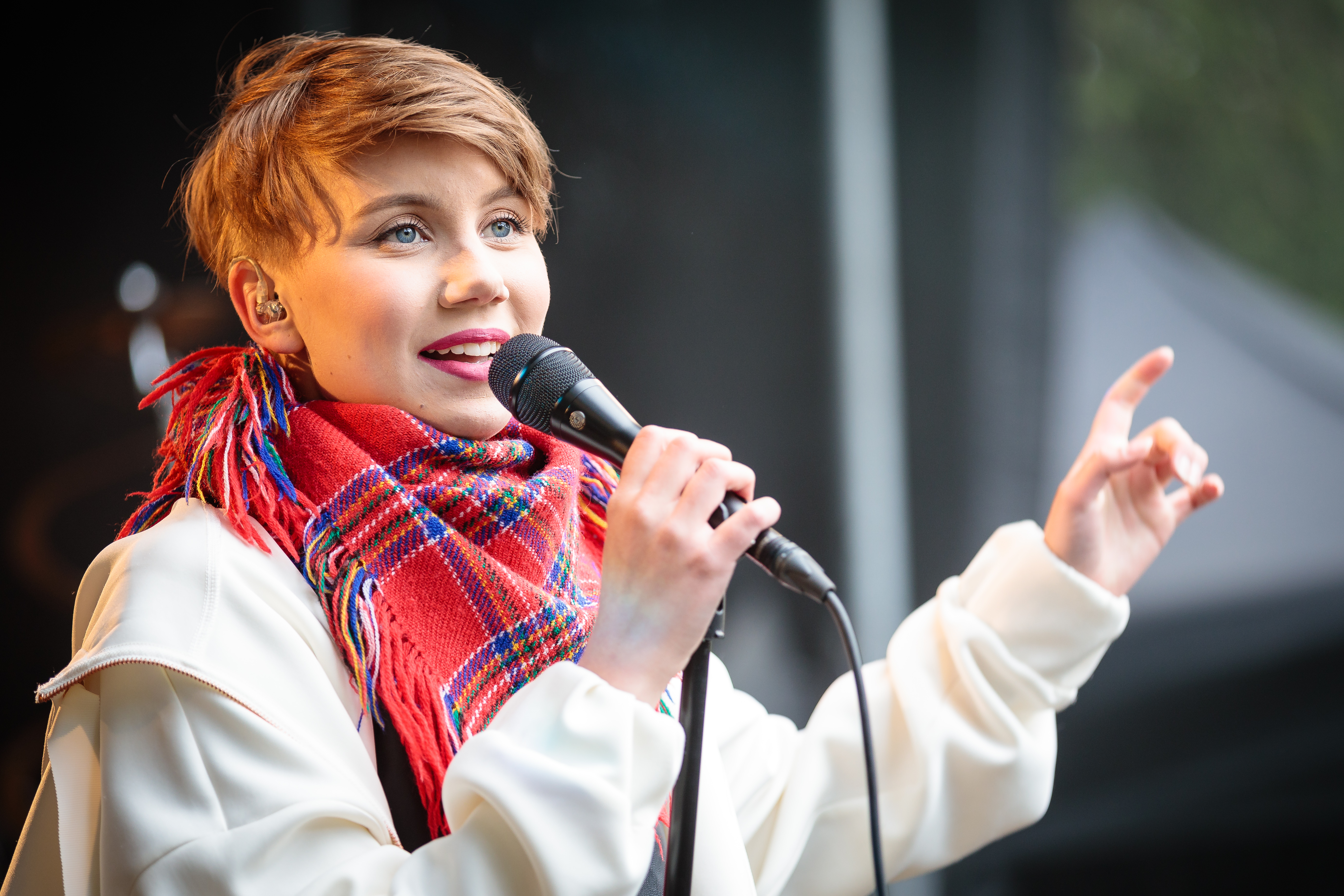
Ella Marie Hætta Isaksen, 2018

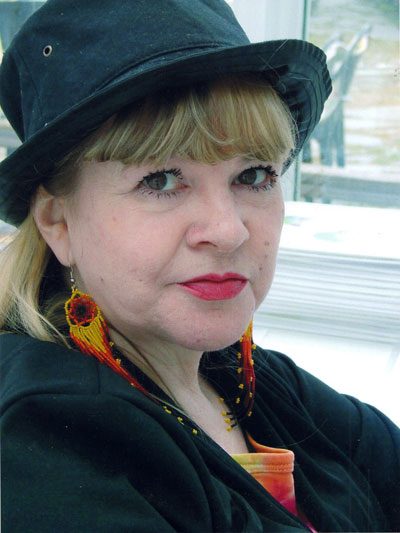
Marry Somby, 2008

- Halvdan Wexelsen Freihow (1883 in Tana – 1965), a priest and culturist
- Per Fokstad (1890 in Tana – 1973), a teacher, politician, and intellectual of Sami origin
- Kathrine Johnsen (1917 in Tana – 2002), a Sámi teacher and worked for NRK Sápmi
- Kristen Kyrre Bremer (1925 in Tana – 2013), a theologian and bishop in the Church of Norway
- Per A. Utsi (d. 2024), politician, member of parliament
- Nils Utsi (1943 in Tana – 2019), a Sámi actor, stage director, and film director
- Ella Marie Hætta Isaksen (born 1998 in Tana), a Sami musician

=== Writers ===
- Reidar Hirsti (1925 in Tana – 2001), a newspaper editor, politician, and author of books about historical or Sami topics
- Nils Jernsletten (1934 in Tana – 2012), a professor of Sámi at University of Tromsø and editor of Sámi newspaper Ságat
- Marry A. Somby (born 1953 in Tana), a Sami author
- Hanne Ørstavik (born 1969 in Tana), a Norwegian writer
- Siri Broch Johansen (born 1967 in Tana), a Sami author, singer, and textbook author

=== Sport ===
- Martin Schanche (born 1945), nicknamed Mister Rallycross, a former racing driver and politician who was brought up in Tana
- Sigleif Johansen (born 1948 in Tana), a former biathlete
- Signe Trosten (born 1970 in Tana), a former biathlete
- Signe Marie Store (born 1995 in Tana), a freestyle wrestler
