= Bonakas =

Bonakas: Bonakas (Norwegian); Bonjákas (Northern Sami); Punakas (Kven)
- Village
- Interactive map of Bonakas
- Location within Finnmark Location within Norway
- Coordinates: 70°25′36″N 28°14′00″E
- Country: Norway
- Region: Northern Norway
- County: Finnmark
- District: Øst-Finnmark
- Municipality: Deatnu-Tana
- Elevation: 3 m (9.8 ft)
- Time zone: UTC+01:00 (CET)
  - Summer (DST): UTC+02:00 (CEST)
- Post Code: 9845 Tana

Bonakas (Norwegian), Bonjákas (Northern Sami), or Punakas (Kven) is a village in Deatnu-Tana Municipality in Finnmark county, Norway. The village lies on the western bank of the Tana River, just north of the village of Rustefjelbma.

Historically, Bonakas has been inhabited by the Sami people and Kven people, more recently newcomers from the more southern parts of Norway and Finland have moved in. However, Tana Municipality (unlike Porsanger Municipality) has not declared Kven an official language.

== Climate ==
Climate data for Rustefjelbma 1991-2013 (10 m)
Month	Jan	Feb	Mar	Apr	May	Jun	Jul	Aug	Sep	Oct	Nov	Dec	Year
Daily mean °C (°F)	−10.4 (13.3)	−10.1 (13.8)	−5.9 (21.4)	−0.9 (30.4)	4.4 (39.9)	9.1 (48.4)	12.8 (55.0)	11.4 (52.5)	7.2 (45.0)	0.9 (33.6)	−5.2 (22.6)	−7.7 (18.1)	0.5 (32.8)
Average precipitation mm (inches)	38.8 (1.53)	35.6 (1.40)	35.9 (1.41)	26.9 (1.06)	29.3 (1.15)	47.3 (1.86)	63 (2.5)	59.7 (2.35)	47 (1.9)	53.4 (2.10)	35.9 (1.41)	42.2 (1.66)	515 (20.33)
Source: NOAA
