= Quartzite =

Hard, non-foliated metamorphic rock

- Metamorphic rock
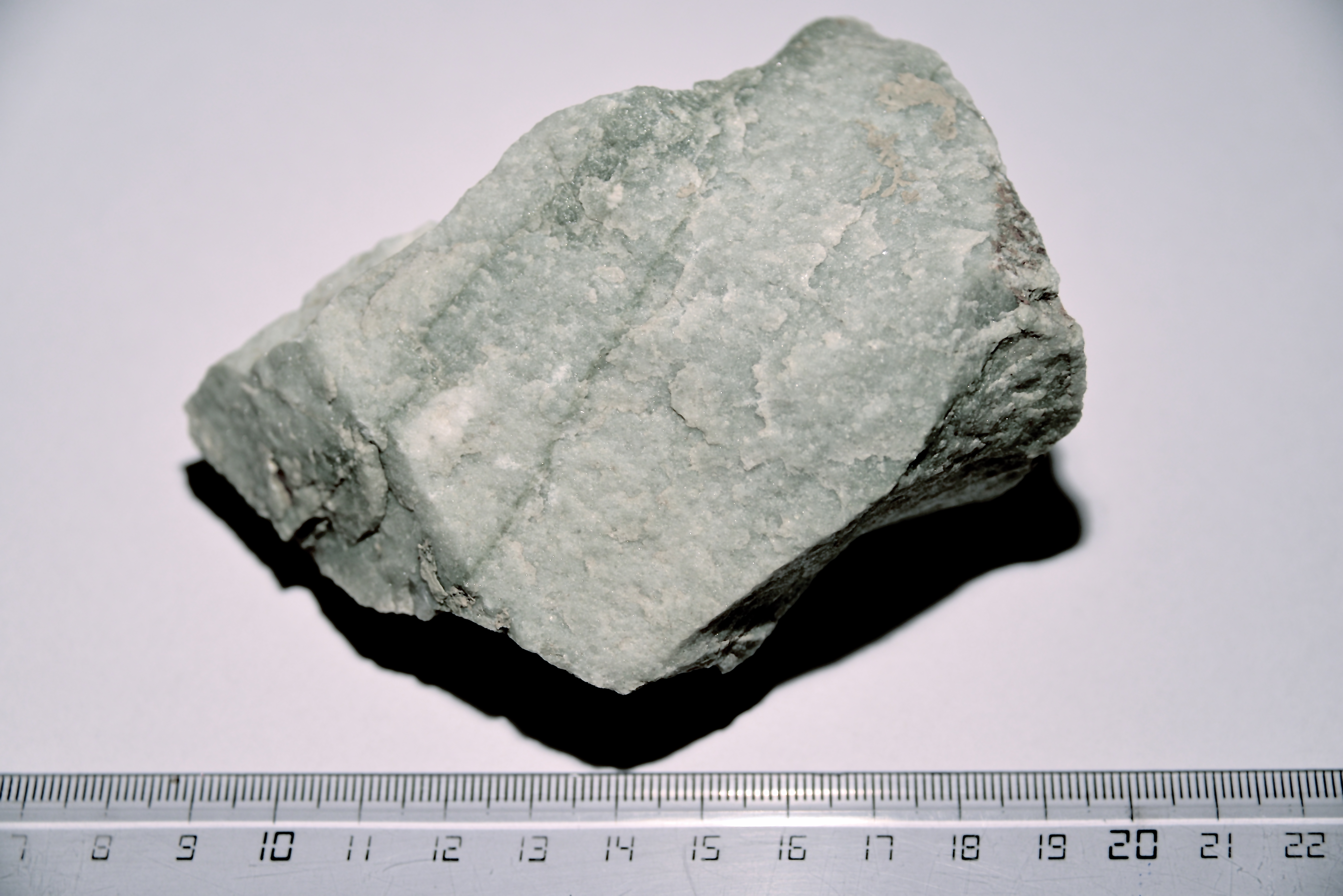
- Quartzite, containing darker bands of phengite and chlorite, from Maurienne Valley in the French Alps

Composition
- Quartz

Physical Characteristics
- Fabric: Non-foliated

Relationships
- Protoliths: Quartz Sandstone

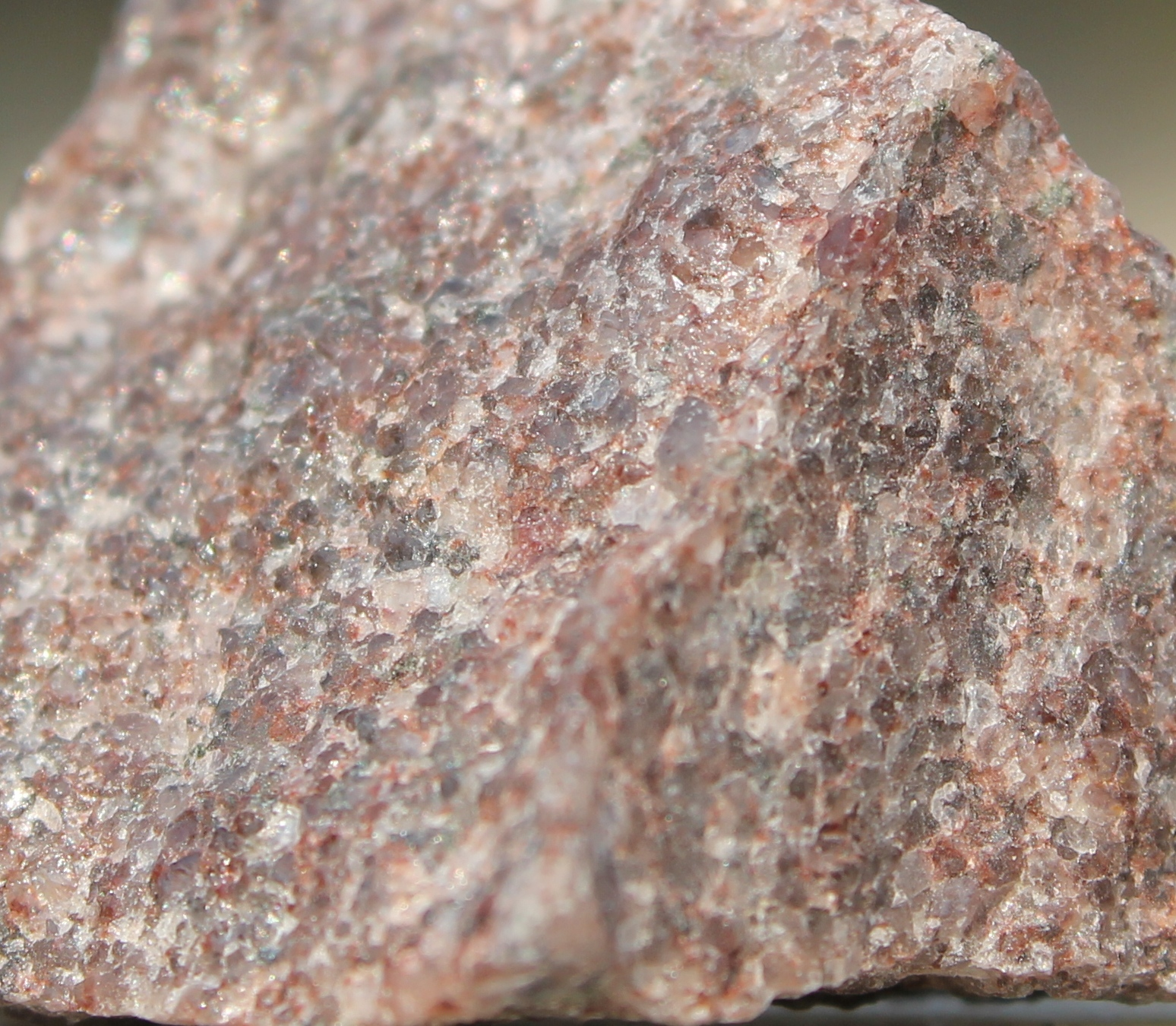
Quartzite can have a grainy, glassy, sandpaper-like surface

Quartzite is a hard, non-foliated metamorphic rock that was originally pure quartz sandstone. Sandstone is converted into quartzite through heating and pressure usually related to tectonic compression within orogenic belts, and hence quartzite is a metasandstone. Pure quartzite is usually white to grey, though quartzites often occur in various shades of pink and red due to varying amounts of hematite. Other colors, such as yellow, green, blue and orange, are due to other minerals.

The term quartzite is also sometimes used for very hard but unmetamorphosed sandstones that are composed of quartz grains thoroughly cemented with additional quartz. Such sedimentary rock has come to be described as orthoquartzite to distinguish it from metamorphic quartzite, which is sometimes called metaquartzite to emphasize its metamorphic origins.

Quartzite is very resistant to chemical weathering and often forms ridges and resistant hilltops. The nearly pure silica content of the rock provides little material for soil; therefore, the quartzite ridges are often bare or covered only with a very thin layer of soil and little (if any) vegetation. Some quartzites contain just enough weather-susceptible nutrient-bearing minerals such as carbonates and chlorite to form a loamy, fairly fertile though shallow and stony soil.

Quartzite has been used since prehistoric times for stone tools. It is presently used for decorative dimension stone, as crushed stone in highway construction, and as a source of silica for production of silicon and silicon compounds.

== Characteristics and origin ==
Quartzite is a very hard rock composed predominantly of an interlocking mosaic of quartz crystals. The grainy, sandpaper-like surface is glassy in appearance. Minor amounts of former cementing materials, iron oxide, silica, carbonate and clay, often migrate during recrystallization, causing streaks and lenses to form within the quartzite. To be classified as a quartzite by the British Geological Survey, a metamorphic rock must contain at least 80% quartz by volume.

Quartzite is commonly regarded as metamorphic in origin. When sandstone is subjected to the great heat and pressure associated with regional metamorphism, the individual quartz grains recrystallize along with the former cementing material. Most or all of the original texture and sedimentary structures of the sandstone are erased by the metamorphism. The recrystallized quartz grains are roughly equal in size, forming what is called a granoblastic texture, and they also show signs of metamorphic annealing, in which the grains become coarser and acquire a more polygonal texture. The grains are so tightly interlocked that when the rock is broken, it fractures through the grains to form an irregular or conchoidal fracture.

Geologists had recognized by 1941 that some rocks show the macroscopic characteristics of quartzite, even though they have not undergone metamorphism at high pressure and temperature. These rocks have been subject only to the much lower temperatures and pressures associated with diagenesis of sedimentary rock, but diagenesis has cemented the rock so thoroughly that microscopic examination is necessary to distinguish it from metamorphic quartzite. The term orthoquartzite is used to distinguish such sedimentary rock from metaquartzite produced by metamorphism. By extension, the term orthoquartzite has occasionally been more generally applied to any quartz-cemented quartz arenite. Orthoquartzite (in the narrow sense) is often 99% SiO_{2} with only very minor amounts of iron oxide and trace resistant minerals such as zircon, rutile and magnetite. Although few fossils are normally present, the original texture and sedimentary structures are preserved.

The typical distinction between a true orthoquartzite and an ordinary quartz sandstone is that an orthoquartzite is so highly cemented that it will fracture across grains, not around them. This is a distinction that can be recognized in the field. In turn, the distinction between an orthoquartzite and a metaquartzite is the onset of recrystallization of existing grains. The dividing line may be placed at the point where strained quartz grains begin to be replaced by new, unstrained, small quartz grains, producing a mortar texture that can be identified in thin sections under a polarizing microscope. With increasing grade of metamorphism, further recrystallization produces foam texture, characterized by polygonal grains meeting at triple junctions, and then porphyroblastic texture, characterized by coarse, irregular grains, including some larger grains (porphyroblasts).

== Occurrence ==
=== North America ===
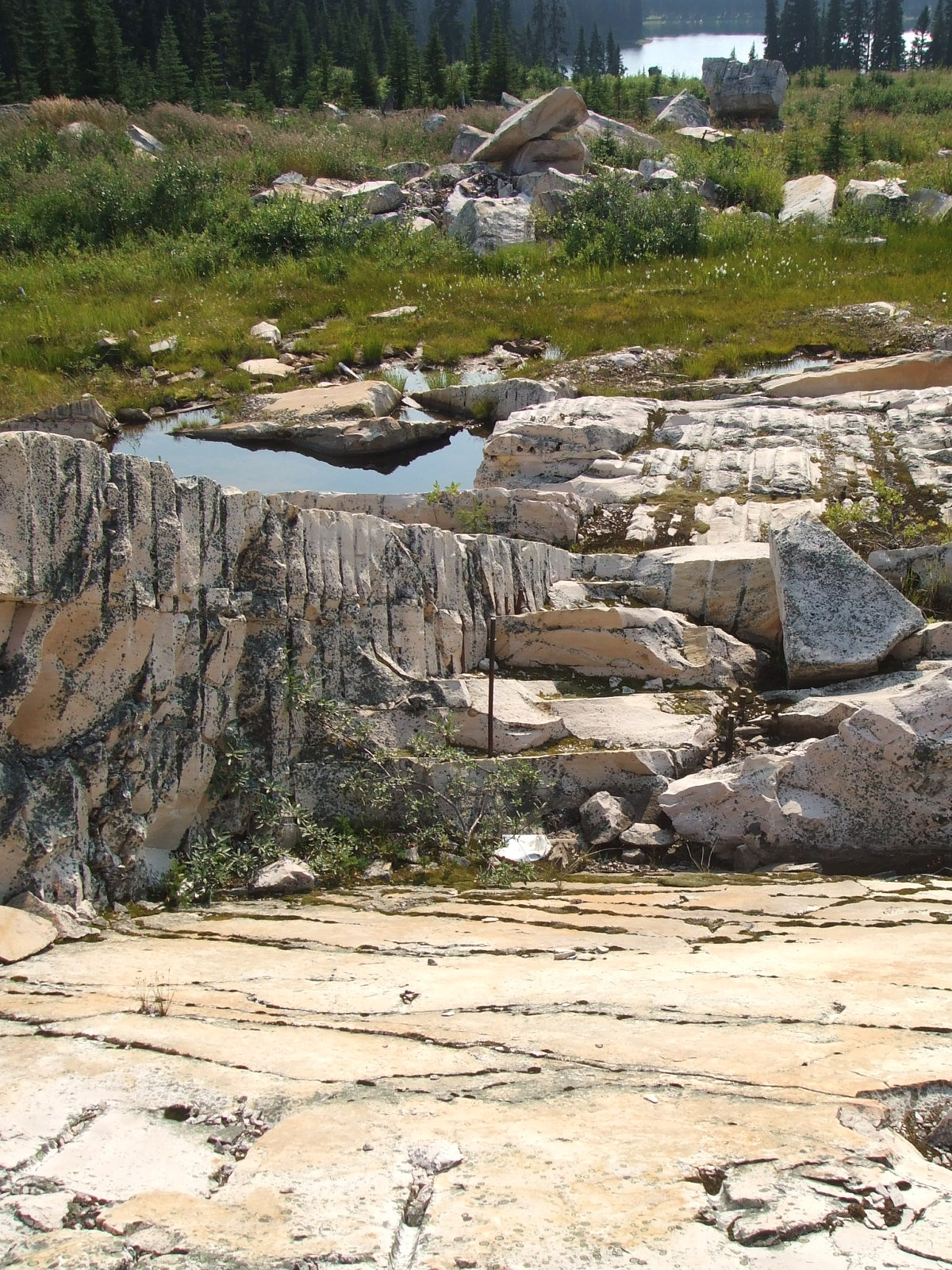
Abandoned quartzite mine in Kakwa Provincial Park, British Columbia, Canada

In the United States, formations of quartzite can be found in some parts of Pennsylvania, the Washington DC area, eastern South Dakota, Central Texas, southwest Minnesota, Devil's Lake State Park in the Baraboo Range in Wisconsin, the Wasatch Range in Utah, near Salt Lake City, Utah and as resistant ridges in the Appalachians and other mountain regions. Quartzite is also found in the Morenci Copper Mine in Arizona. The town of Quartzsite in western Arizona derives its name from the quartzites in the nearby mountains in both Arizona and Southeastern California. A glassy vitreous quartzite has been described from the Belt Supergroup in the Coeur d'Alene district of northern Idaho.

In Canada, the La Cloche Mountains in Ontario are composed primarily of white quartzite. Vast areas of Nova Scotia are underlain by quartzite.

Paleoproterozoic quartzite-rhyolite successions are common in the Precambrian basement rock of western North America. The quartzites in these successions are interpreted as sedimentary beds deposited atop older greenstone belts. The quartzite-rhyolite successions may record the formation of back-arc basins along the margin of Laurentia, the ancient core of North America, between episodes of mountain building during the assembly of the continent. The quartzites are often nearly pure quartz, which is puzzling for sediments which must have eroded from igneous rock. Their purity may reflect unusual conditions of chemical weathering, at a time when the Earth's atmosphere was beginning to be oxygenated.

=== Europe ===
In Ireland areas of quartzite are found across the west and northwest, with Errigal in County Donegal as the most prominent outcrop. A good example of a quartzite area is on the Corraun Peninsula in County Mayo, which has a very thin layer of Irish Atlantic Bog covering it.

In the United Kingdom, a craggy ridge of quartzite called the Stiperstones (early Ordovician – Arenig Epoch, 500 Ma) runs parallel with the Pontesford-Linley fault, 6 km north-west of the Long Mynd in south Shropshire. Also to be found in England are the Cambrian "Wrekin quartzite" (in Shropshire), and the Cambrian "Hartshill quartzite" (Nuneaton area). In Wales, Holyhead Mountain and most of Holy island off Anglesey sport excellent Precambrian quartzite crags and cliffs. In the Scottish Highlands, several mountains (e.g. Foinaven, Arkle) composed of Cambrian quartzite can be found in the far north-west Moine Thrust Belt running in a narrow band from Loch Eriboll in a south-westerly direction to Skye.

In continental Europe, various regionally isolated quartzite deposits exist at surface level in a belt from the Rhenish Massif and the German Central Highlands into the Western Czech Republic, for example in the Taunus and Harz mountains. In Poland, quartzite deposits at surface level exists in Świętokrzyskie Mountains. In Norway, deposits are quarried near Austertana, which is one of the largest quarries in the world at 850,000 tonnes (840,000 long tons; 940,000 short tons) annually, and Mårnes near Sandhornøya with an output of 150,000 tonnes (150,000 long tons; 170,000 short tons) annually. Deposits are also quarried in Kragerø Municipality, and several other deposits are known but not actively quarried.

=== Elsewhere ===
The highest mountain in Mozambique, Monte Binga (2436 m), as well as the rest of the surrounding Chimanimani Plateau are composed of very hard, pale grey, Precambrian quartzite. Quartzite is also mined in Brazil for use in kitchen countertops.

== Uses ==
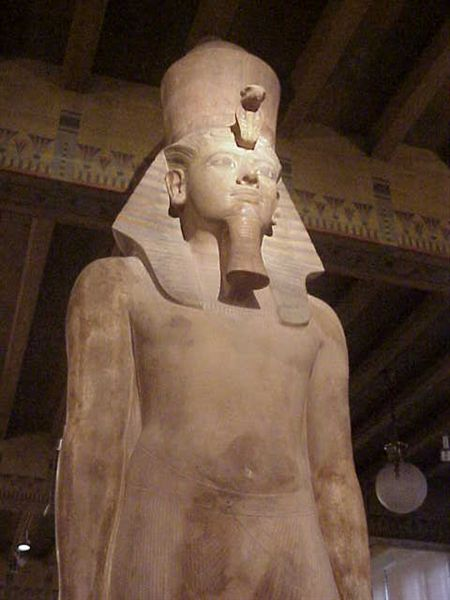
Quartzite statue of an Egyptian Pharaoh, 14th century BCE

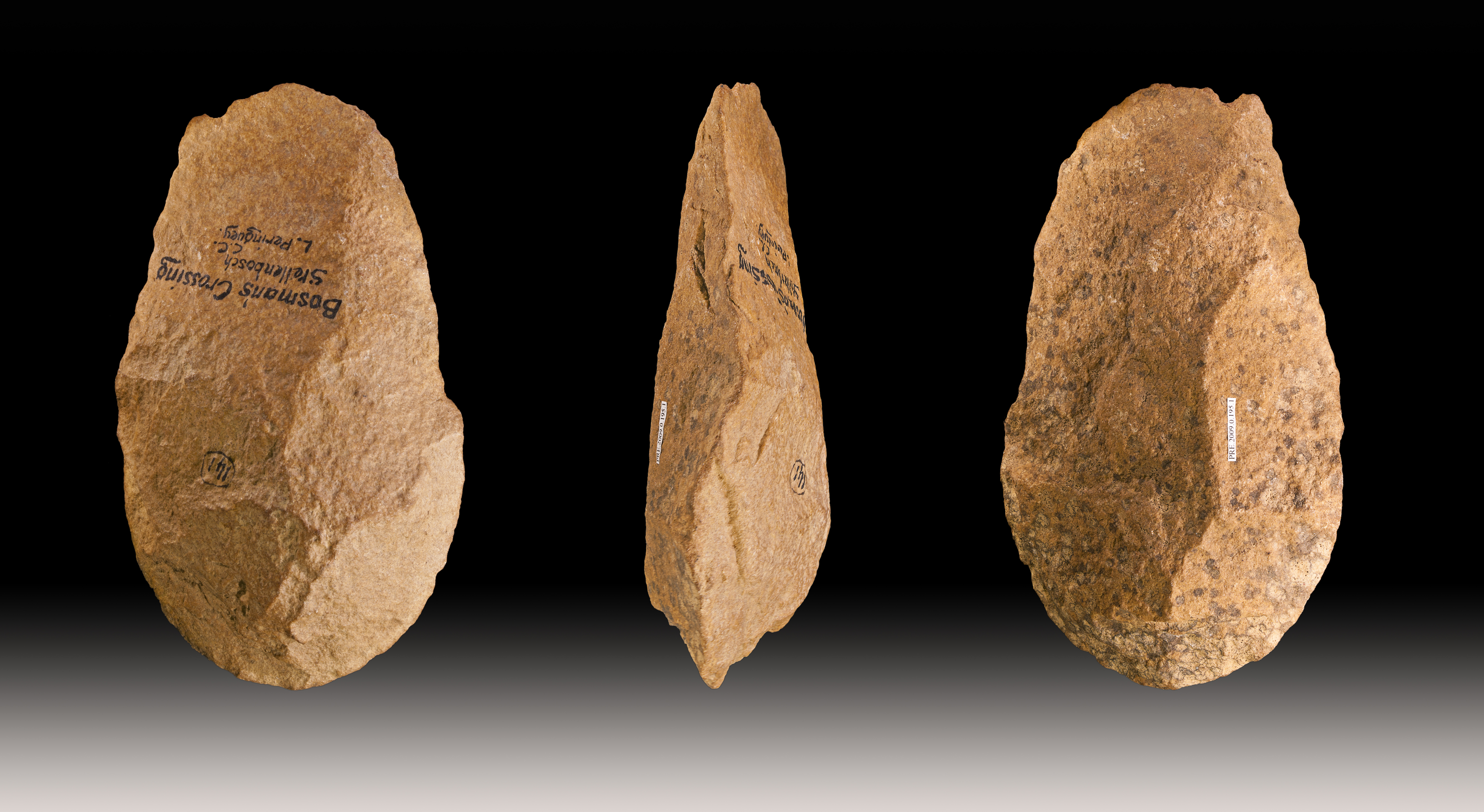
Quartzite biface hand axe from Stellenbosch, South Africa

Quartzite is a decorative stone and may be used to cover walls, as roofing tiles, as flooring, and stairsteps. Its use for countertops in kitchens is expanding rapidly. It is harder and more resistant to stains than granite. Crushed quartzite is sometimes used in road construction. High purity quartzite is used to produce ferrosilicon, industrial silica sand, silicon and silicon carbide. During the Paleolithic, quartzite was used, along with flint, quartz, and other lithic raw materials, for making stone tools. Prehistoric humans in the southeastern United States often made mortars out of quartzite stones.

== Safety ==
As quartzite is a form of silica, it is a possible cause for concern in various workplaces. Cutting, grinding, chipping, sanding, drilling, and polishing natural and manufactured stone products can release hazardous levels of very small, crystalline silica dust particles into the air that workers breathe. Crystalline silica of respirable size is a recognized human carcinogen and may lead to other diseases of the lungs such as silicosis and pulmonary fibrosis.

== Etymology ==
The term quartzite is derived from German: Quarzit.

== Gallery ==
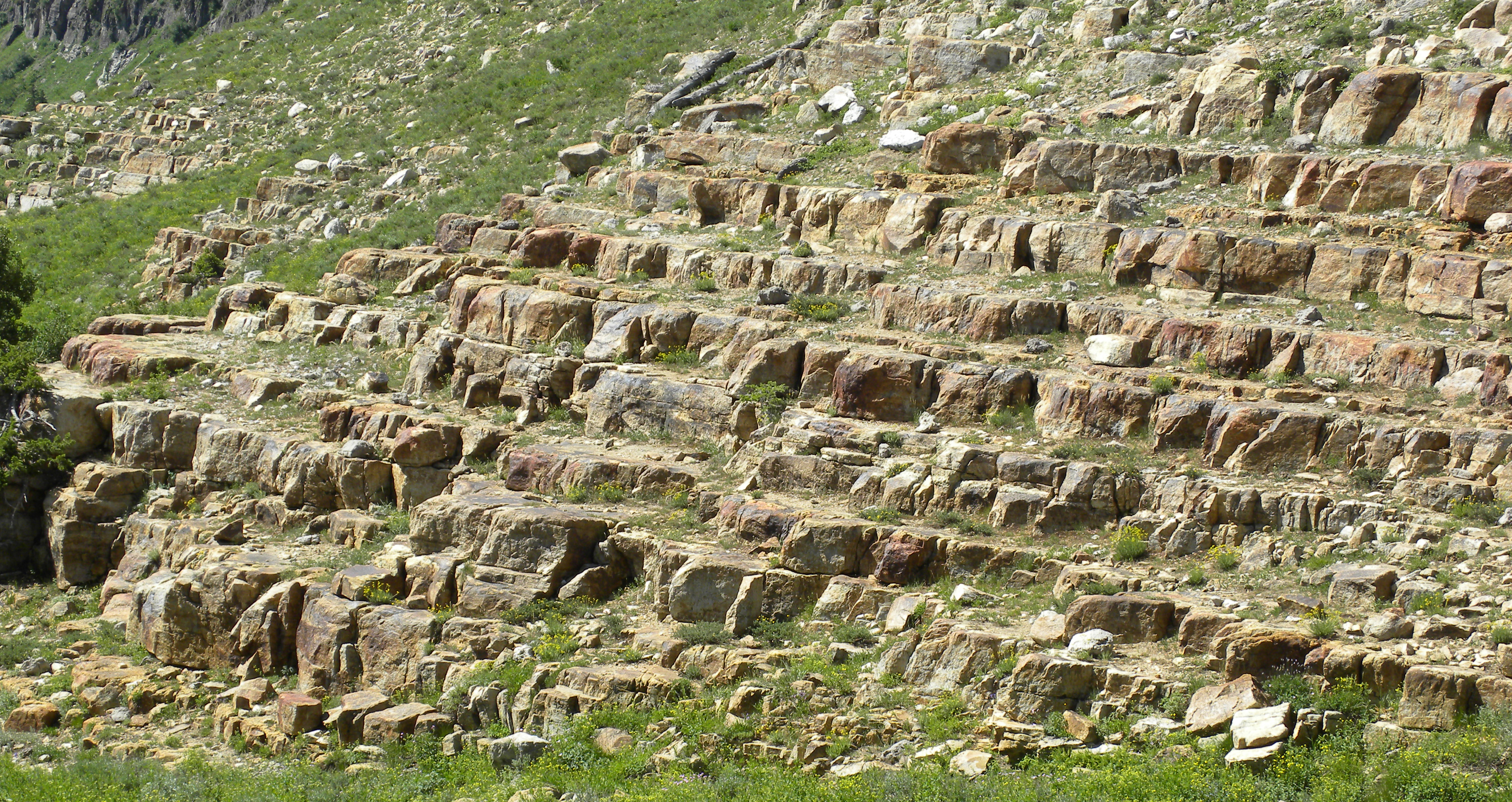
Swan Peak Quartzite (Ordovician) exposed just north of Tony Grove Lake, Cache County, Utah

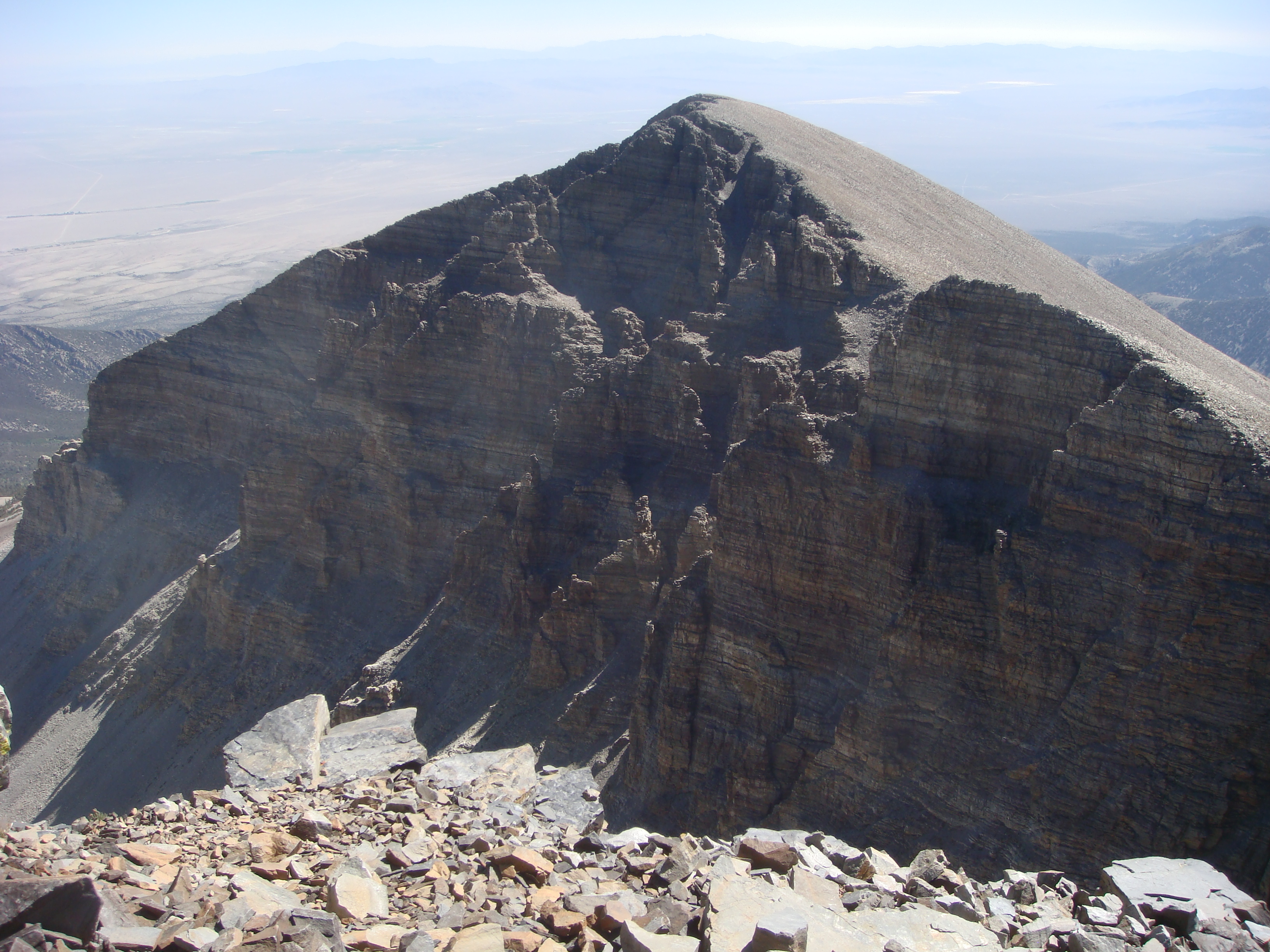
The quartzite of the Prospect Mountain Formation at the top of Doso Doyabi in White Pine County, Nevada

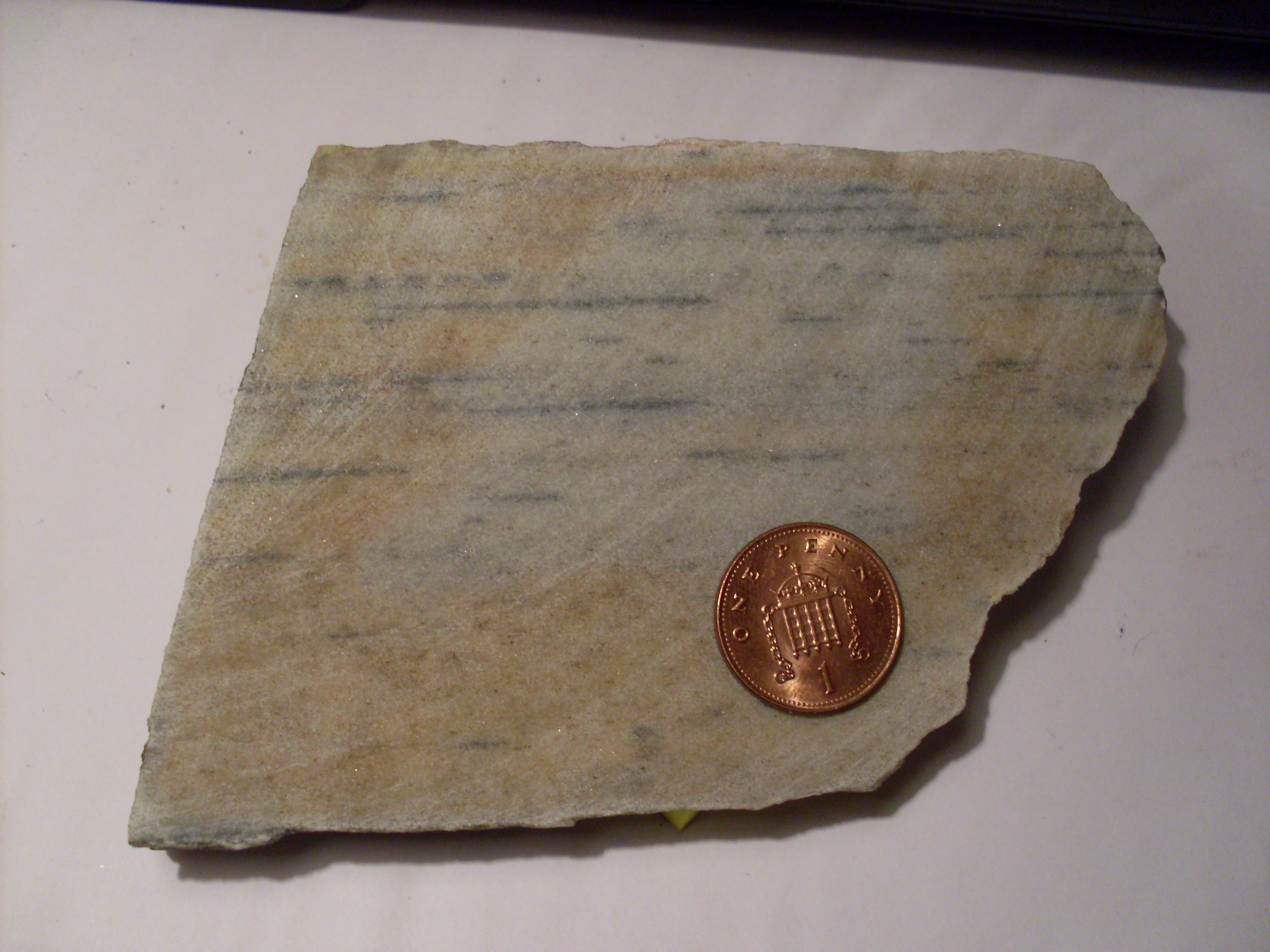
Quartzite from Salangen Municipality, Troms county, Norway, showing elongate crystals associated with high strain regimes

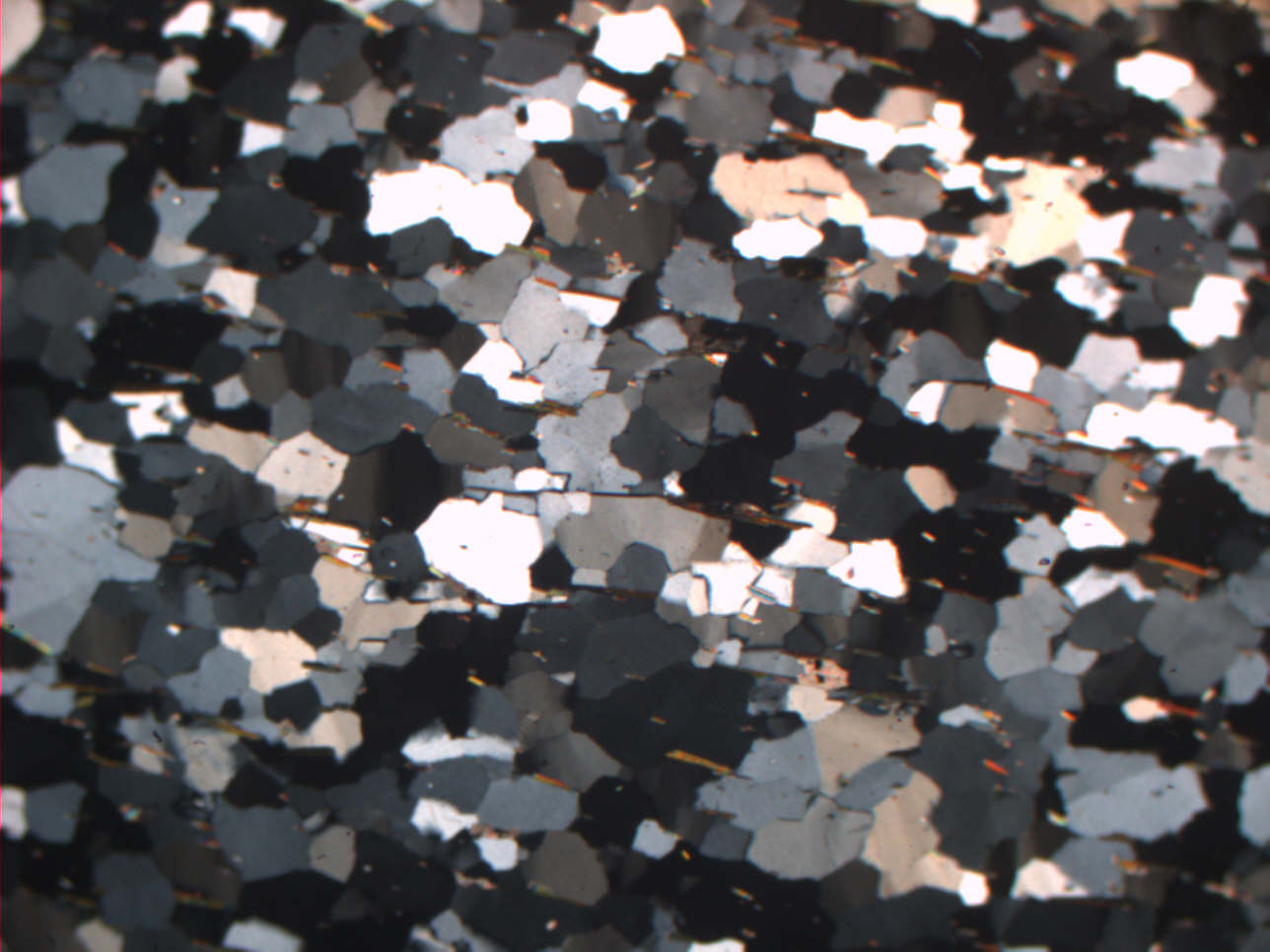
Thin section of quartzite from Salangen, Troms county, Norway, showing elongate crystals associated with high strain regimes

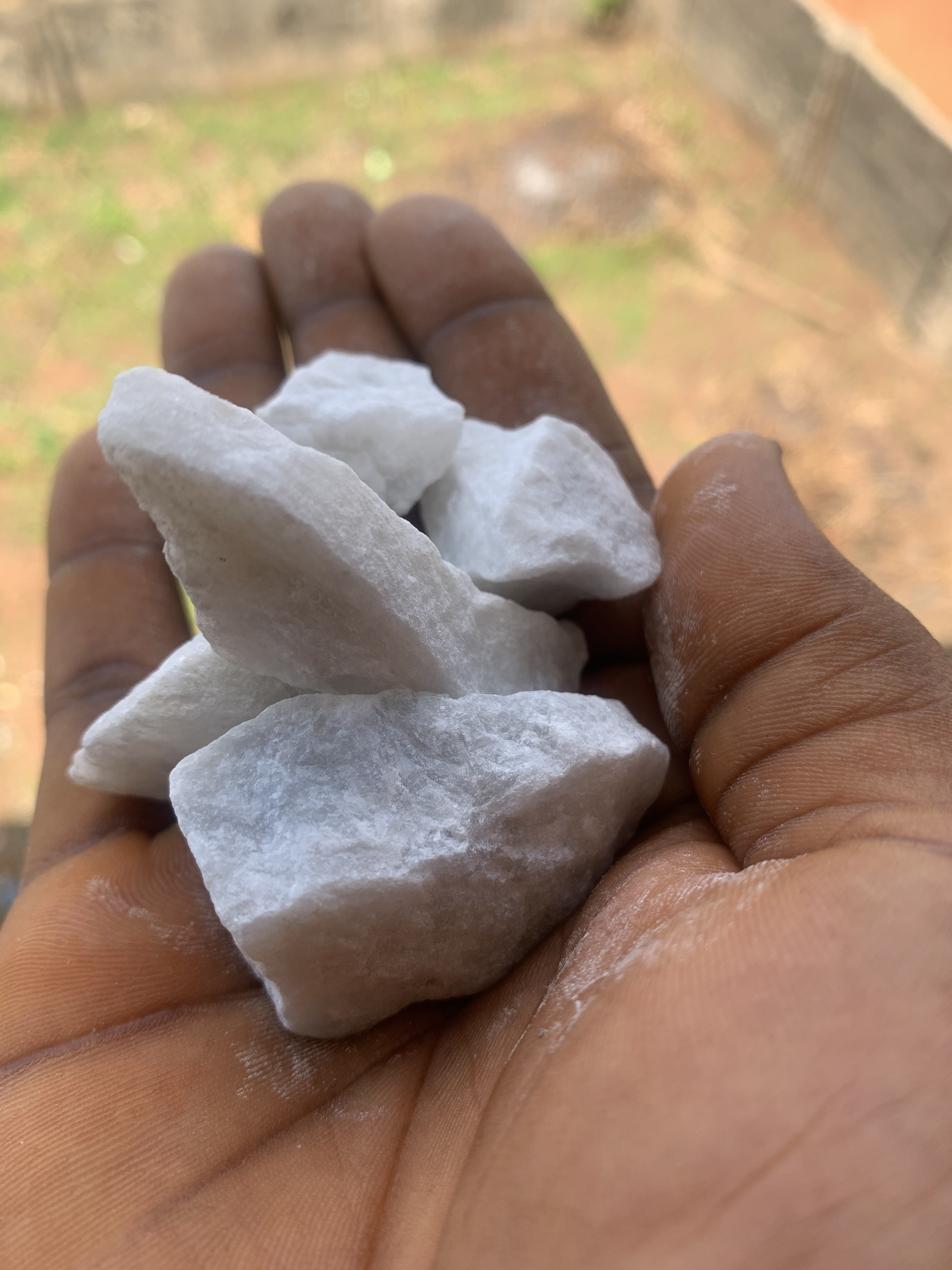
Quartzite pieces used for aesthetic and building construction purposes

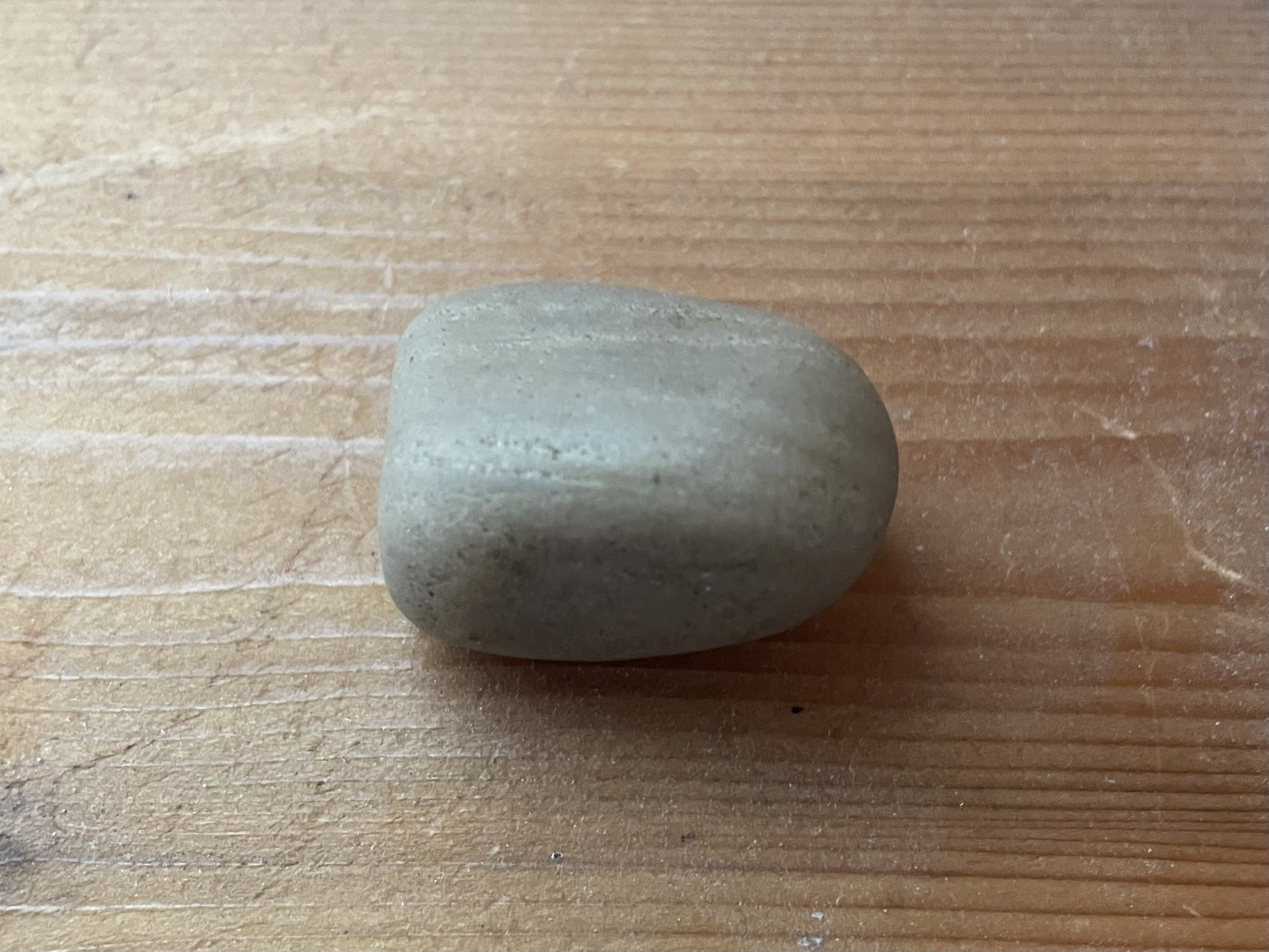
Quartzite pebble from Ontario, Canada

== See also ==
- Neomorphism
- Mar del Plata style -A type of chalet or cottage native to Mar del Plata, Argentina, characterized by its distinctive orthoquartzite stone facade.
