= Nissojávri =

Lake in Tana municipality, Norway

- Nissujavri (historic name)
- Interactive map of the lake
- Location: Finnmark
- Coordinates: 70.3908°N 27.8133°E
- Basin countries: Norway
- Max. length: 4.2 kilometres (2.6 mi)
- Max. width: 1.2 kilometres (0.75 mi)
- Surface area: 2.51 km^{2} (0.97 sq mi)
- Shore length^{1}: 11.3 kilometres (7.0 mi)
- Surface elevation: 221 metres (725 ft)
- References: NVE
- ^{1} Shore length is not a well-defined measure.

Nissojávri is a lake in Deatnu-Tana Municipality in Finnmark county, Norway. The 2.51-square-kilometre (0.97 sq mi) lake lies about 3 kilometres (1.9 mi) south of the village of Vestertana.

== See also ==
- List of lakes in Norway
