= Tana Church =

- Tana kirke
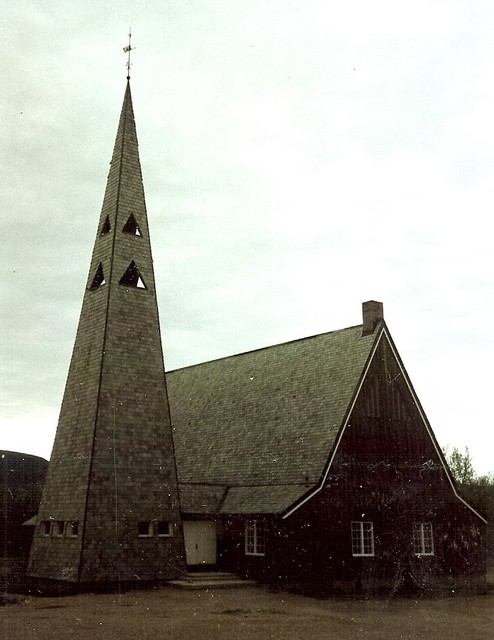
- View of the church
- Tana Church
- 70.399106°N 28.185368°E
- Location: Deatnu-Tana Municipality, Finnmark
- Country: Norway
- Denomination: Church of Norway
- Churchmanship: Evangelical Lutheran

History
- Status: Parish church
- Founded: 1720
- Consecrated: 1964

Architecture
- Functional status: Active
- Architect: Esben Poulsson
- Architectural type: Long church
- Completed: 1964 (62 years ago)

Specifications
- Capacity: 300
- Materials: Wood

Administration
- Diocese: Nord-Hålogaland
- Deanery: Indre Finnmark prosti
- Parish: Tana
- Norwegian Cultural Heritage Site
- Type: Church
- Status: Not protected
- ID: 85071

Tana Church (Norwegian: Tana kirke) is a parish church of the Church of Norway in Deatnu-Tana Municipality in Finnmark county, Norway. It is located in the village of Rustefjelbma. It is the main church for the Tana parish which is part of the Indre Finnmark prosti (deanery) in the Diocese of Nord-Hålogaland. The unique, brown, wooden church was built in a long church style in 1964 using designs drawn up by the architect Esben Poulsson (1907-1974) to replace the old church that was burned down by the retreating German forces towards the end of World War II. The church seats about 300 people.

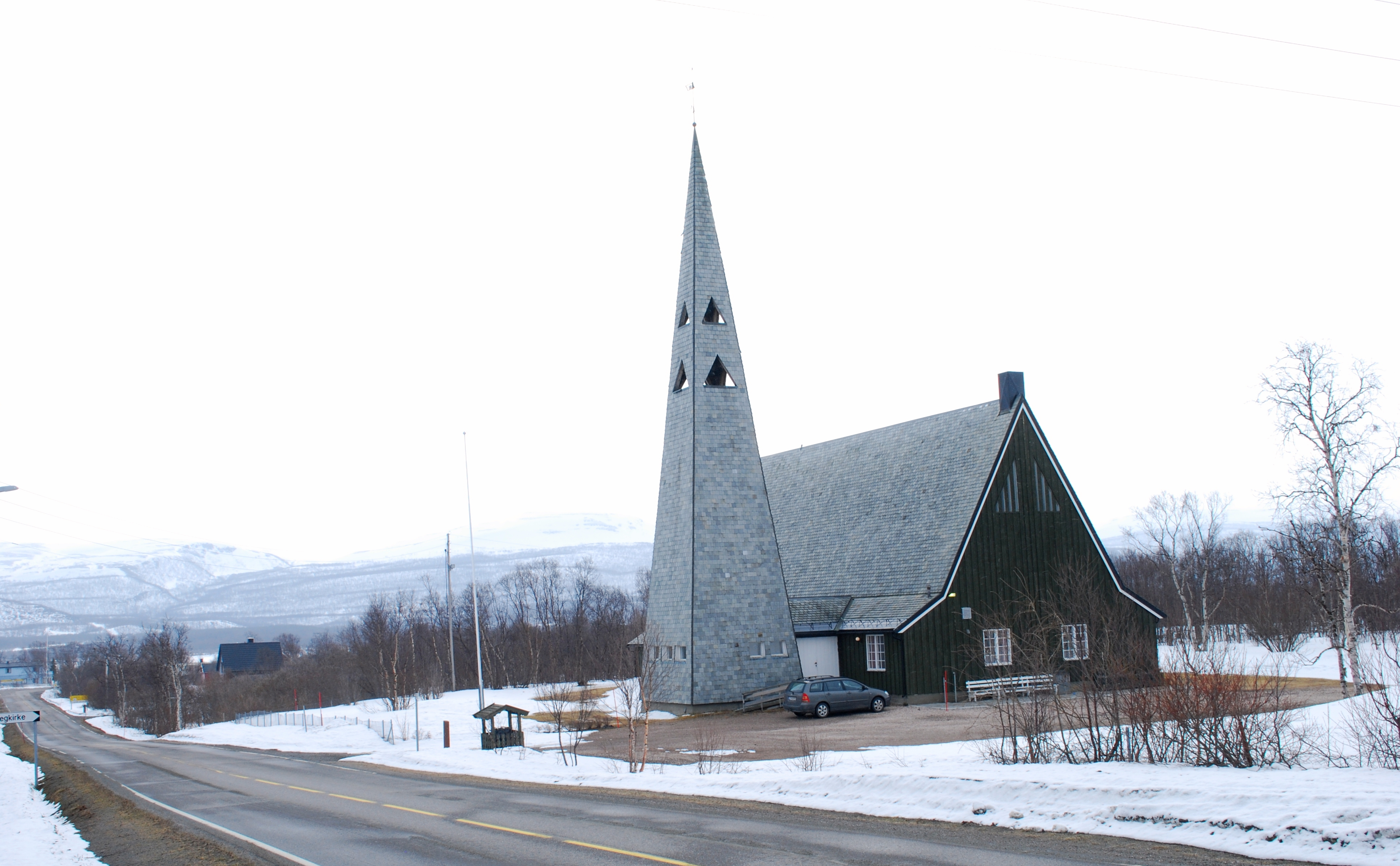
Tana Church in Rustefjelbma

== History ==
The first church in Tana was built around the year 1720. In 1851, the old church was torn down and replaced with a new church on the same site. In 1892, a new church was constructed on the same site. This new building was designed by the architect Jacob Wilhelm Nordan. The church was destroyed by fire in 1944 by the retreating German army which burned most buildings in Finnmark. After the war, the church was rebuilt when funds were available. The new church was completed in 1964. The church was constructed of wood with a roof covered in tiles of quartz shale from nearby Alta Municipality. The altarpiece was painted by the artist Terje Grøstad. One of the unique elements in the design of the church is the 26-metre (85 ft) tall free-standing steeple alongside the church.

== See also ==
- List of churches in Nord-Hålogaland
