= Austertana Chapel =

- Austertana kapell
- Austertana Chapel
- 70.443228°N 28.487338°E
- Location: Deatnu-Tana Municipality, Finnmark
- Country: Norway
- Denomination: Church of Norway
- Churchmanship: Evangelical Lutheran

History
- Status: Parish church
- Founded: 1958
- Consecrated: 1958

Architecture
- Functional status: Active
- Architect: Trond Dancke
- Architectural type: Long church
- Completed: 1958 (68 years ago)

Specifications
- Capacity: 144
- Materials: Wood

Administration
- Diocese: Nord-Hålogaland
- Deanery: Indre Finnmark prosti
- Parish: Tana
- Norwegian Cultural Heritage Site
- Type: Church
- Status: Not protected
- ID: 83825

Austertana Chapel (Norwegian: Austertana kapell) is a parish church of the Church of Norway in Deatnu-Tana Municipality in Finnmark county, Norway. It is located in the village of Austertana. It is one of the churches for the Tana parish which is part of the Indre Finnmark prosti (deanery) in the Diocese of Nord-Hålogaland. The white, wooden church was built in a long church style in 1958 by the architect Trond Dancke. The church seats about 144 people.

== See also ==
- List of churches in Nord-Hålogaland
