= Sundvannet =

Lake in Tana, Norway

Sundvannet (Norwegian) Sopmirjávri (Northern Sami)
- Interactive map of the lake
- Location: Finnmark
- Coordinates: 70.4528°N 28.1307°E
- Basin countries: Norway
- Max. length: 5.9 kilometres (3.7 mi)
- Max. width: 1.7 kilometres (1.1 mi)
- Surface area: 5.57 km^{2} (2.15 sq mi)
- Surface elevation: 98 metres (322 ft)
- References: NVE

Sundvannet (Norwegian) or Sopmirjávri (Northern Sami) is a lake in Deatnu-Tana Municipality in Finnmark county, Norway. The lake has an area of 5.57-square-kilometre (2.15 sq mi) and lies 98 meters above sea level.

== See also ==
- List of lakes in Norway
