= Tana bru =

Tana bru (Norwegian); Deanušaldi (Northern Sami); Tenon silta (Kven)
- Village
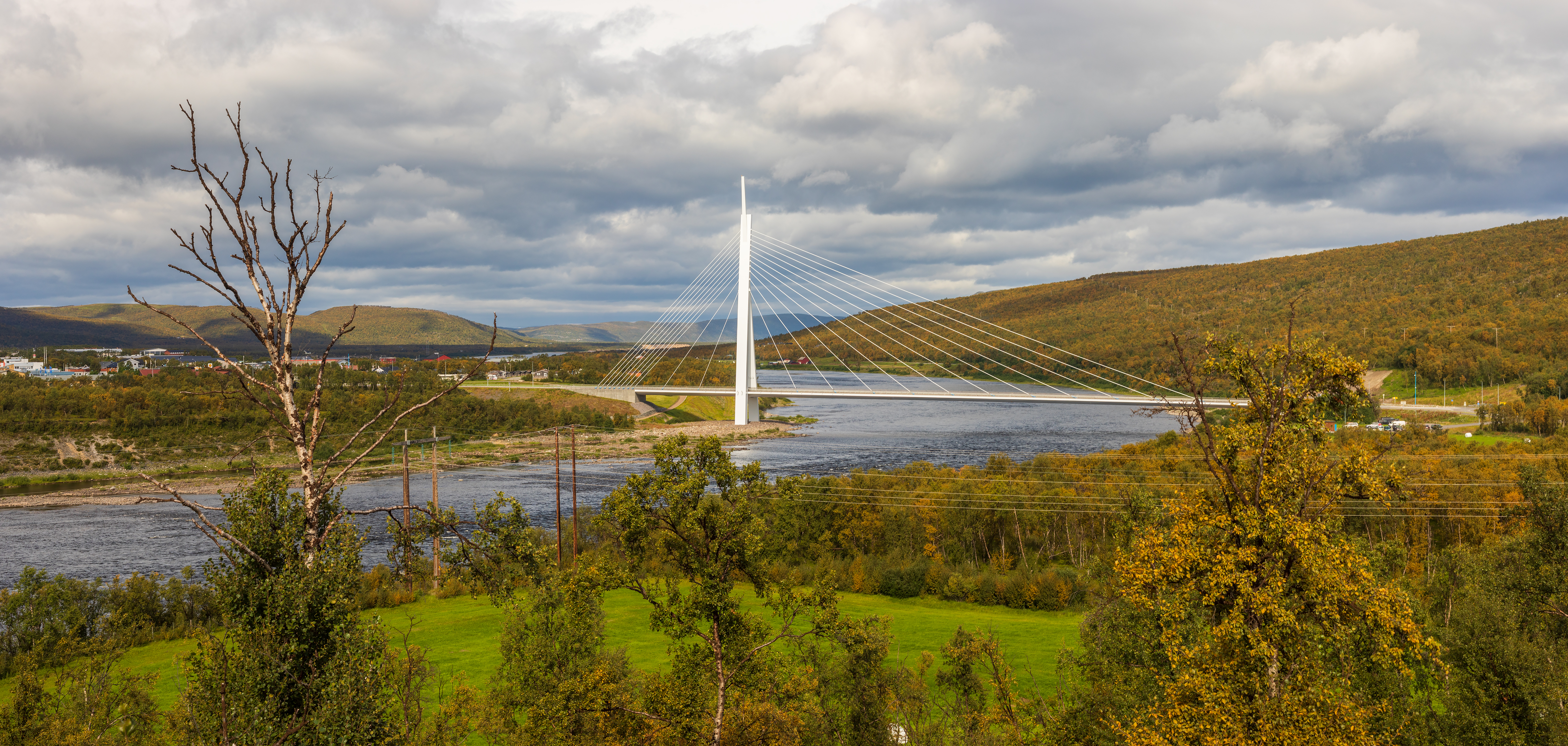
- View of the village and bridge
- Interactive map of: Tana bru (Norwegian); Deanušaldi (Northern Sami); Tenon silta (Kven)
- Location within Finnmark Location within Norway
- Coordinates: 70.1986°N 28.1919°E
- Country: Norway
- Region: Northern Norway
- County: Finnmark
- District: Øst-Finnmark
- Municipality: Deatnu-Tana

Area
  - Total: 1.21 km^{2} (0.47 sq mi)
- Elevation: 24 m (79 ft)

Population (2023)
  - Total: 743
  - Density: 614/km^{2} (1,590/sq mi)
- Time zone: UTC+01:00 (CET)
  - Summer (DST): UTC+02:00 (CEST)
- Post Code: 9845 Tana

Tana bru (Norwegian), Deanušaldi (Northern Sami), or Tenon silta (Kven) is the administrative centre of Deatnu-Tana Municipality in Finnmark county, Norway. The village lies on the western bank of the Tana River, along the European route E6 highway.

The 1.21-square-kilometre (300-acre) village has a population (2023) of 743 which gives the village a population density of 614 inhabitants per square kilometre (1,590/sq mi).

== Name ==
The village name means "Tana Bridge" in Norwegian, and the actual Tana Bridge (on the E6 highway) crosses the river at this village, connecting Tana bru to the village of Skiippagurra on the other side of the river. The Northern Sami language version of the name is Deanušaldi.
