= Tanafjord =

Fjord in Finnmark county, Norway

Tanafjorden (Norwegian); Deanuvuotna (Northern Sami); Tenonvuono (Kven)
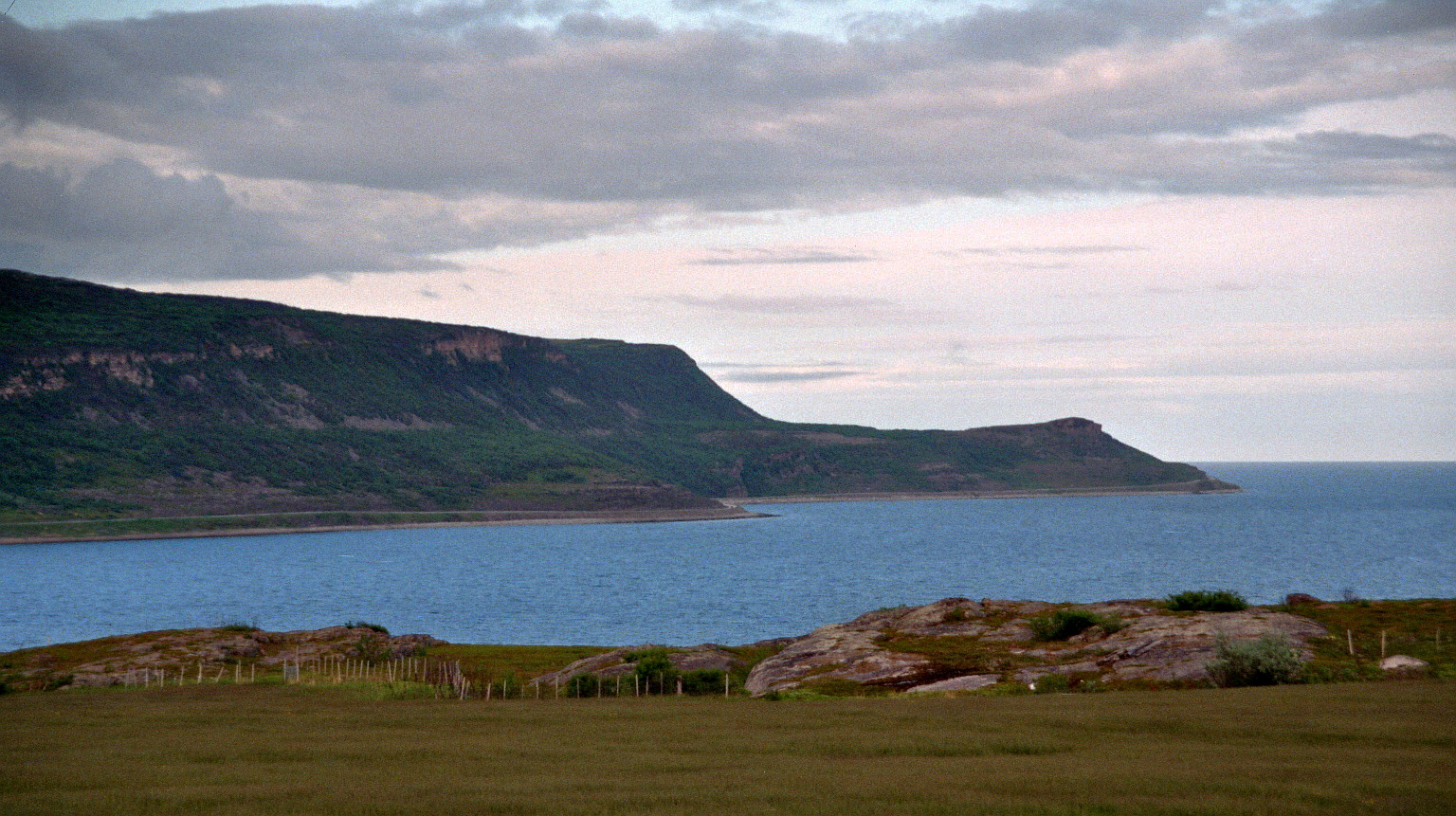
- View of the fjord
- Interactive map of the fjord
- Location: Finnmark county, Norway
- Coordinates: 70.7800°N 28.4508°E
- Type: Fjord
- Primary inflows: Tana River
- Primary outflows: Barents Sea
- Basin countries: Norway
- Max. length: 65 kilometres (40 mi)
- Max. width: 8 to 12 km (5.0 to 7.5 mi)

The Tanafjord (Tanafjorden (Norwegian), Deanuvuotna (Northern Sami), or Tenonvuono (Kven)) is a large fjord in Finnmark county, Norway. It is located in the municipalities of Tana, Gamvik, and Berlevåg. Its orientation is mainly north–south, reaching approximately 65 kilometres (40 mi) from the small village of Smalfjord in Tana Municipality in the south to the mouth of the fjord at the Barents Sea. The fjord separates the Nordkinn Peninsula (Gamvik Municipality) in the west from the Varanger Peninsula (Berlevåg Municipality) in the east.

The Tana River empties into the southern part of the fjord. There are several side fjords which branch off of the main Tanafjorden including the Hopsfjorden, Langfjorden, and Gulgofjorden. There are some settlements along the fjord, but they are all small and rather isolated. Settlements include the villages of Vestertana, Austertana, Trollfjorden, Skjånes, Nervei, and Store Molvik. Norwegian County Road 98 and Norwegian County Road 890 run along the southern parts of the fjord.

== See also ==
- List of Norwegian fjords
