= Tana Bridge =

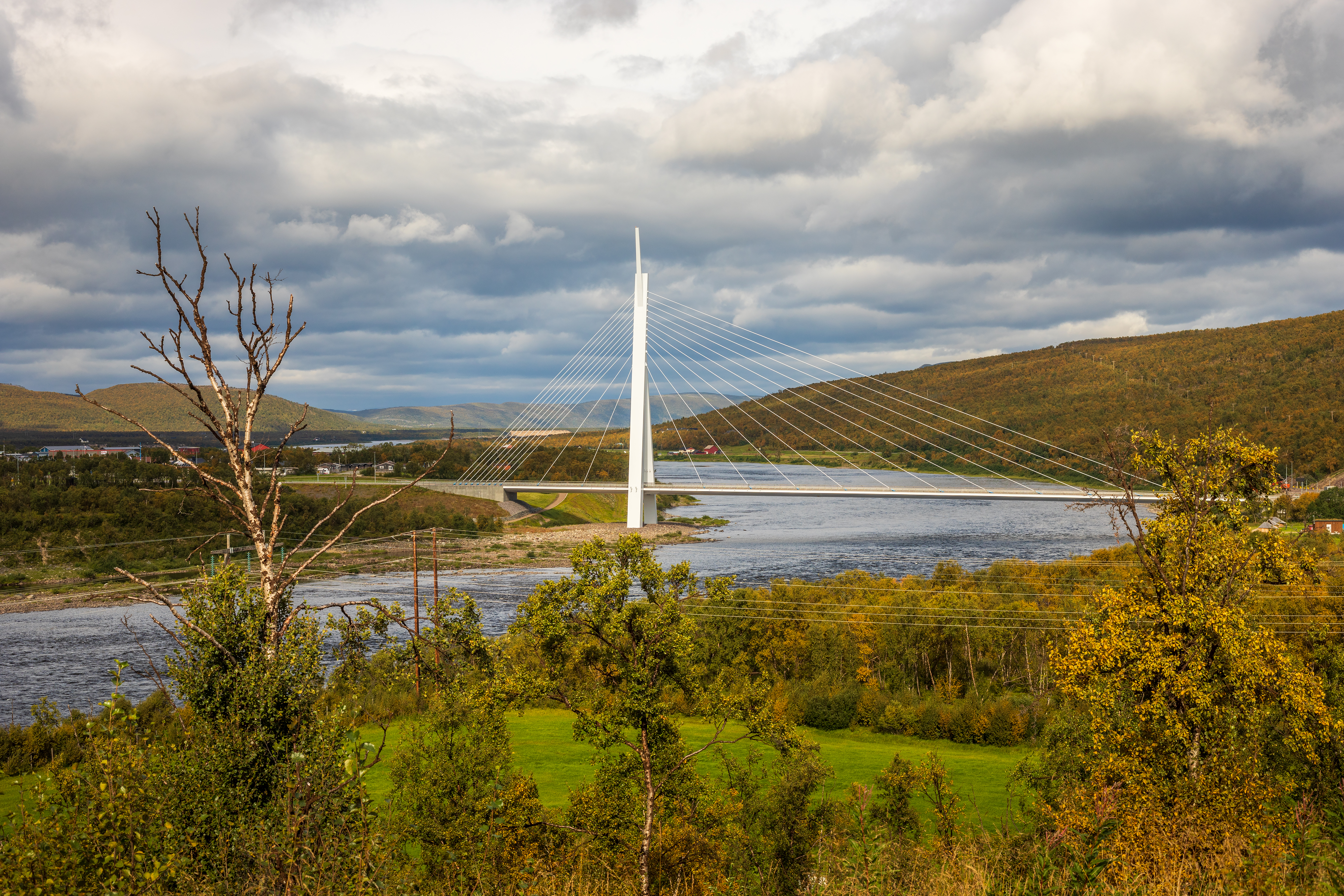
- Coordinates: 70°11′54″N 28°11′58″E
- Carries: E6 E75
- Crosses: Tana River
- Locale: Finnmark, Norway

Characteristics
- Total length: 260 m (850 ft)
- Longest span: 234 m (768 ft)

History
- Opened: 2020

Location
- Interactive map of Tana Bridge

The Tana Bridge (Norwegian: Tana bru) is a bridge that crosses the Tana River in Finnmark, Norway. It is located in a village also called Tana bru.

The contemporary bridge was opened for traffic on 15 September 2020 to replace the previous one. It is a 260 meter long cable-stayed bridge with a main span of 234 meters. It is the only bridge over the lowest 100 km of the Tana River. One nickname ('new bridge') "Nybrua", was in use in 2020 when the village once had two bridges.

Previously, there have been other bridges named Tana Bridge; one bridge was demolished, from late 2020 and into 2021. Previously, one bridge was demolished in 1944 and rebuilt in 1948. The first bridge was seasonal and first set up in 1939.

The bridge glows in different colours of light at night with GVA color-changing luminaires.

== The first bridges ==
The first bridge was a wooden bridge opened in 1939. It was removed every autumn, because it could not handle the ice-melt flooding in spring. In the winter an ice road was made. It had traffic interruption every year when the bridge needed to be removed but the ice was not strong enough to drive on.

Germany occupied Norway 1940-1945 and wanted a continuous road, so they built a suspension bridge similar to the one built 1948. This bridge that was destroyed on November 6, 1944, as a consequence of the Liberation of Finnmark during World War II.

== The bridge that existed from 1948 to 2020 ==
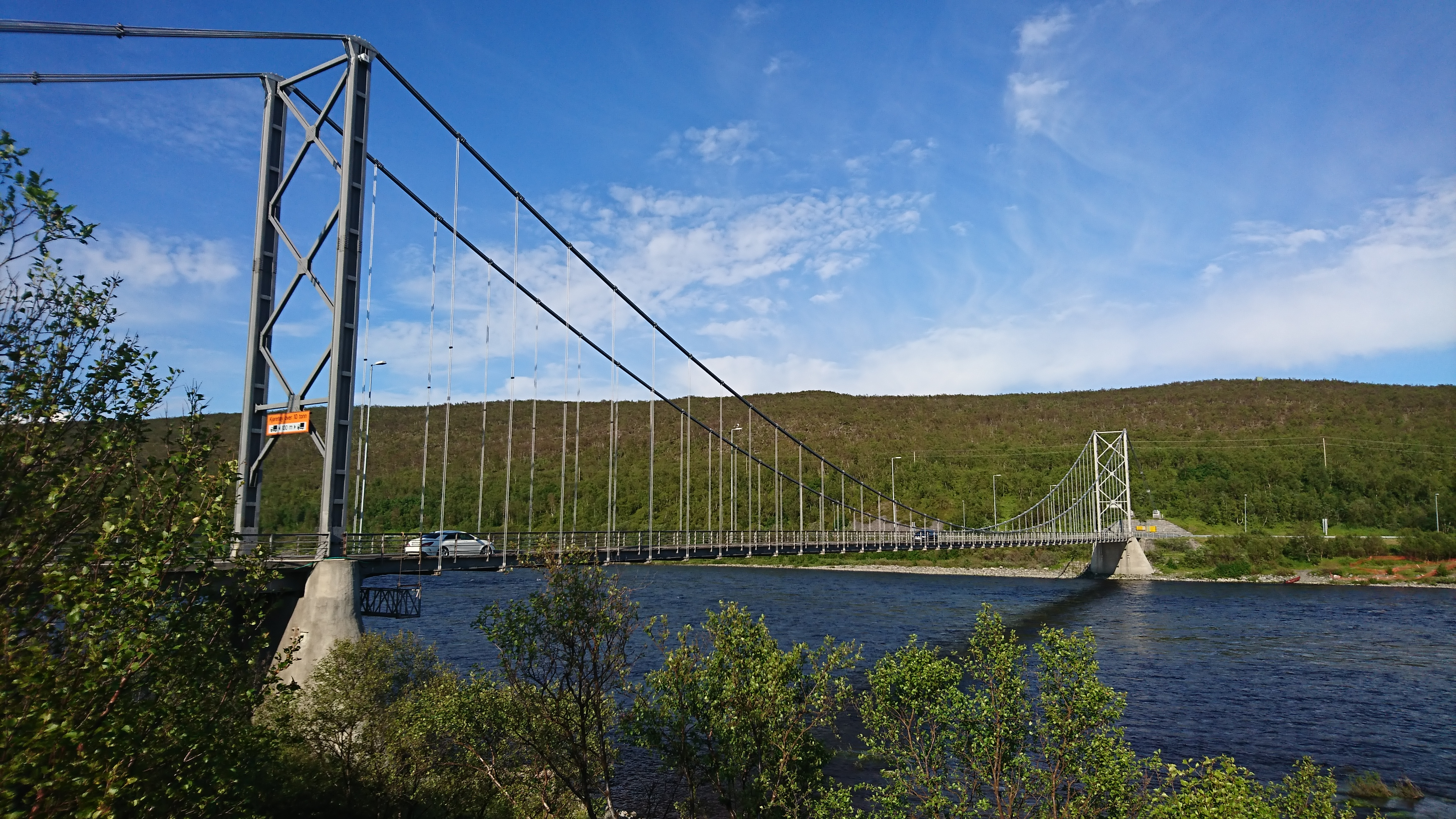
The bridge that was in operation until 2020

In December 2020, twelve metres (from the center) of the bridge, was removed permanently; the final demolishment of the bridge was done [in first half of] 2021.

The old bridge was 220 metres long, and the main span is 194 metres. It was opened in 1948.

== See also ==
- Sami Bridge

== Related reading ==
- Chris Mann (2012) British Policy and Strategy Towards Norway, 1941-45 (Palgrave Macmillan) ISBN 9780230210226
