= Tana (Finland–Norway) =

River in Norway and Finland

Tana Tenojoki / Deatnu / Tana älv
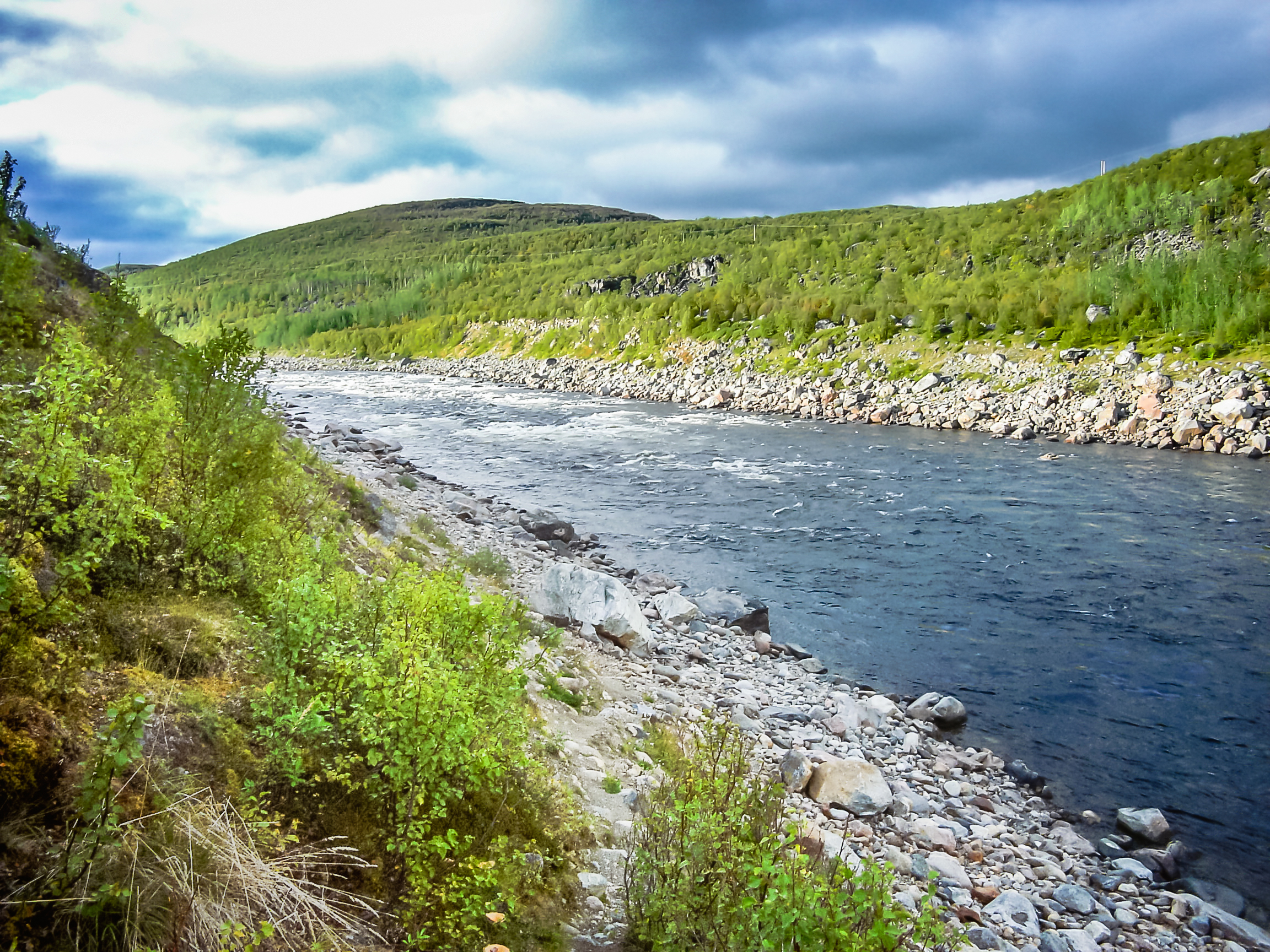
- View of the river

Location
- Countries: Norway; Finland
- Regions: Finnmark; Lapland

Physical characteristics
- Source: Anarjohka-Karasjohka
  - location: North of Karigasniemi, Norway-Finland border
  - coordinates: 69°26′03″N 25°48′13″E
  - elevation: 125 m (410 ft)
- Mouth: Tanafjorden
  - location: Tana Municipality, Finnmark, Norway
  - coordinates: 70.4942504°N 28.3899406°E
  - elevation: 0 m (0 ft)
- Length: 361 km (224 mi)
- Basin size: 16,377 km^{2} (6,323 sq mi)
- Discharge
  - average: 197 m^{3}/s (7,000 cu ft/s)

Basin features
- River system: Karasjohka

The Tana (Finnish: Teno [ˈteno] or Tenojoki; Northern Sami: Deatnu [ˈtea̯tnuː]; Norwegian: Tana/Tanaelva; Swedish: Tana älv) is a 361-kilometre (224 mi) long river in the Sápmi area of northern Fennoscandia. The river flows through Finnmark county, Norway and the Lapland region of Finland. For 256 kilometers of its length, the Tana and its tributaries form a part of the border between Finland and Norway. The Sámi name means "Great River". The main tributaries of the Tana are the Anarjohka and Karasjohka.

The Tana Valley is the core area for "the River-Sami Culture" in Finnmark; salmon fishing is central in regard to that culture.

Fauna: Predators of juvenile salmon, include mink, otter, and Northern pike.

== History ==
According to written sources since the last half of the 16th century, fishing has been a major livelihood for the Sami people in the river valley. Another source says that has been the case since the 17th century.

== Environmental concerns ==
Erosion at the mouth of the river, in addition to extreme weather, is making the mouth of the river wider but more shallow (as of the 2020s); there is a risk that salmon [or more salmon] during low tide will turn away (from the river) during approach to the river for spawning, according to a committee leader in Tana's municipal council.

The ocean has a (considerable) effect on the river, for about 10 km from the mouth.

== Geography ==
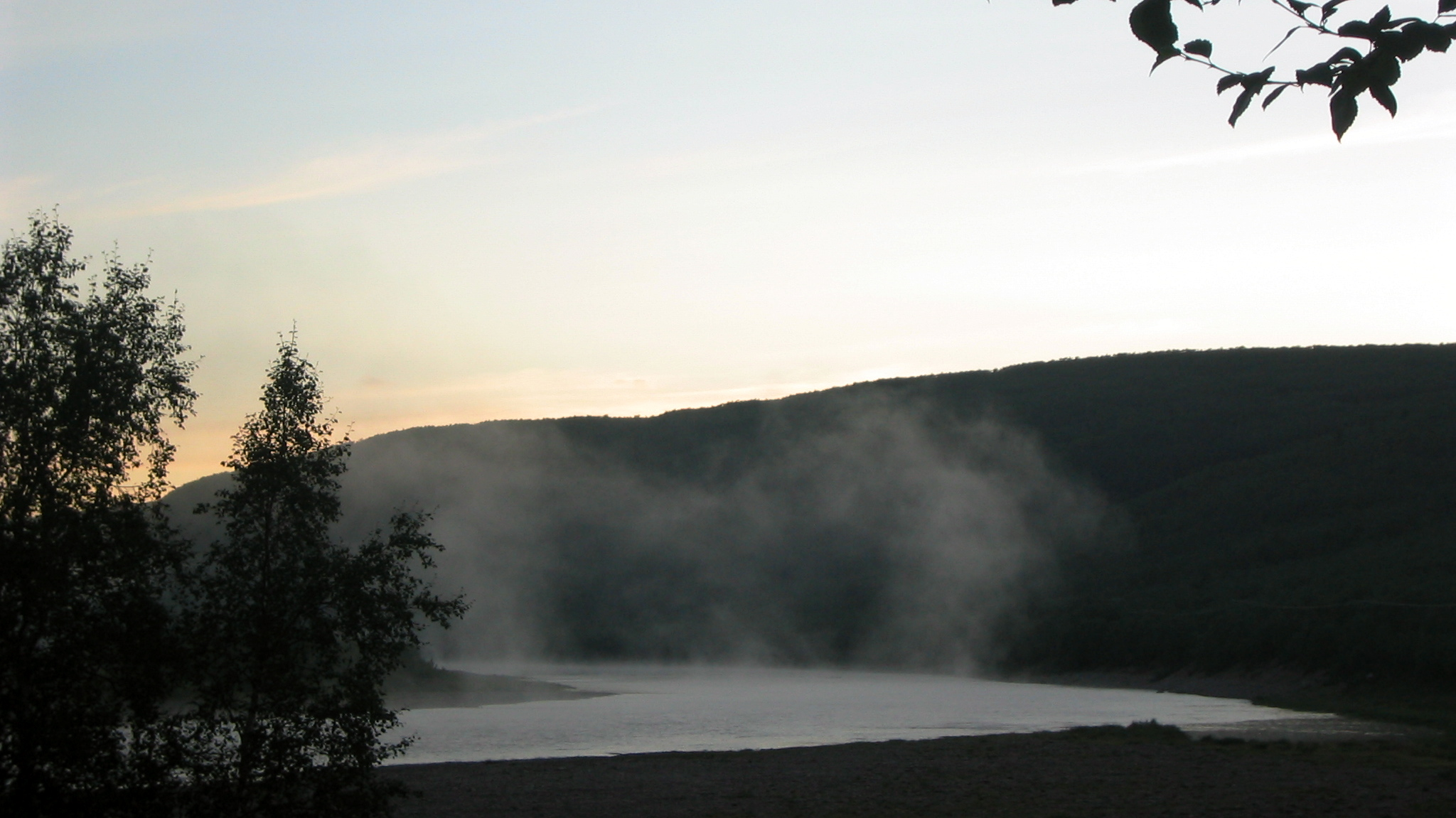
Summer night at Tana River

In its upper course, it runs for 256 km (159 mi) along the Finnish–Norwegian border, between Utsjoki Municipality (in Finland) and Karasjok Municipality and Tana Municipality (in Norway). The river is the fifth longest in Norway. The last 105 kilometres (65 mi) of the river run through the municipality of Tana in Norway. The river discharges into the Tanafjorden, one of the largest and most unspoiled river deltas in Europe. The delta is protected and is an important home to wetland birds. There are large deposits of sand in the delta that are exposed sandbars at low tide.

== Fishing ==
In 2025, in Utsjoki Municipality, 3 days of fishing (for that year), started on the first day of July; "One salmon ... may be caught per fisherman", according to media.

Earlier (and as of the summer of 2024), salmon fishing [was] banned, as ordered by Finnish authorities and Norwegian authorities; however, fishing for species other than salmon [was] facilitated. There [were supposed to be] some opportunities for fishing humpback salmon. The summer season (for fishing) started in May. In July 2024, media said that on Finland's side of the river, applications were made to allow for young people to learn salmon fishing; however, individuals are not allowed to apply — applications must be made by an association or a "fishing area". In July 2024, there was salmon fishing for two days on the Finnish side of the river — and only in two places; only one fish 30–65 cm in length.

Earlier (2022), authorities in Norway and in Finland [did] not permit salmon fishing (in the river). In 2023, on Finland's side of the river, some permits would allow fishing of humpback salmon - and the methods for that would be drift netting and seine fishing.

In 2020, 18,600 kilograms (41,000 lb) was the annual total of salmon captured in the river. Previously, in 2002, fishermen on the river captured an annual total of 99,546 kilograms (219,461 lb) salmon, with an average size of 4.5 kilograms (9.9 lb). The annual sea trout catch for that year on the river was 4,426 kilograms (9,758 lb). Both Finland and Norway regulate the fishing on the river.

During the years when the authorities permitted fishing, one can purchase a fishing permit for angling. Some residents, can get a permit for fishing with barrier net; ['salmon-letter owner' or] laksebreveier use net for fishing.

New fishing rules, are being considered (as of March 2023) by the parliament of Finland.

The Tana is well known for its excellent salmon fishery and is the most productive salmon river in Finland and Norway. The world's record for Atlantic salmon is held by a salmon caught on the Tana; it was 36 kilograms (79 lb) and was taken in 1929 by the Nils Mathis Walle.

=== Installing temporary physical barrier ===
As of the August 2025, there is barrier that lets water flow through, but which most fish are too large to pass through; the barrier is 420 m long, across the river. The barrier will supposedly be removed later that year.

Earlier (2023), Norwegian authorities constructed a barrier with a trap that has sorted out hundreds of humpback salmon (on some days), while allowing other fish to pass. The installation is in the vicinity of Seidaholmen - and downstream of it. In August that year, media said that disassembly of the barrier had started.

== Transportation ==
The Tana Bridge (or Nybrua) was constructed in 2020, replacing the function of a neighboring bridge from 1948; its main span is 234 metres (768 ft).

The Sami Bridge at Utsjoki was constructed in 1993. The European route E6 highway follows the western shoreline of the river for most of the length of the river.

In winter, there are usually two ice roads that are in use from December to April. These roads are located near Rustefjelbma and near Polmak and have a weight limit of 2 tonnes (2.0 long tons; 2.2 short tons), but few other limitations.
