= Spede (disambiguation) =

Spede may refer to:

- Spede Pasanen, a Finnish film director and producer, comedian, humorist and TV personality
- Spede (film), a 2023 biographical film about Spede Pasanen
- SPEDE, an instrument carried on board the Smart-1 satellite
