= Pirre Alanen =

Finnish restaurateur

Pirre Päivikki Alanen (previously Leino, née Pasanen, born 31 December 1965 in Helsinki, Finland) is the daughter of Pirjo and Spede Pasanen.

== Biography ==
Alanen has appeared in film directed by her father: as one of the salespersons in a café in the film Uuno Turhapuron poika, as the daughter of the Maaperä family in the film Viu-hah-hah-taja and as a little girl on a swing in the film Leikkikalugangsteri. She also appeared on the eight episode of the year 1982 in the show Spede Show and in the first part of the documentary Koomikon kuva - Spede Pasanen 1930-2001 about her father. After Spede Pasanen's death in 2001, Alanen hired Saija Hakola as the new host of Speden Spelit. Alanen also worked as one of the "sphere girls" drawing the winning numbers in the show Speden Spelit. At the time of her father's death Alanen worked as the restaurateur of the Helsinki restaurant Sea Horse for a couple of years.

In January 2008 Alanen (then named Leino) was sentenced at the Turku District Court of robbery, unlawful use of guns, severe home invasion, assault and unlawful threats to ten months in prison with parole. She was also sentenced to a fine of 17500 euro for mental damages and to almost 8000 euro of other costs. The reason was an unlawful debt collection.

Pirre Alanen's construction project in Espoo was discussed at court from 2010 to 2014. In spring 2013, two men handling the project were sentenced to prison for severe fraud after the court claimed they had caused 300 thousand euro worth of damages to Alanen by using funds meant for construction to other purposes. Alanen also blamed a Lahti-based bank and its director for forgery, but the charges were dropped. In spring 2014 the District Court of Eastern Finland overturned the sentences and compensation obligations of the men, and the Supreme Court of Finland did not grant Alanen permission to complain.

Alanen was married to Juha Unho (1957–2018), a member of an actor family. The couple have a son named Roy Unho (born 1989), who works as a producer of advertisement films.
