= Spede Pasanen =

Finnish film director and producer, comedian, and inventor (1930–2001)

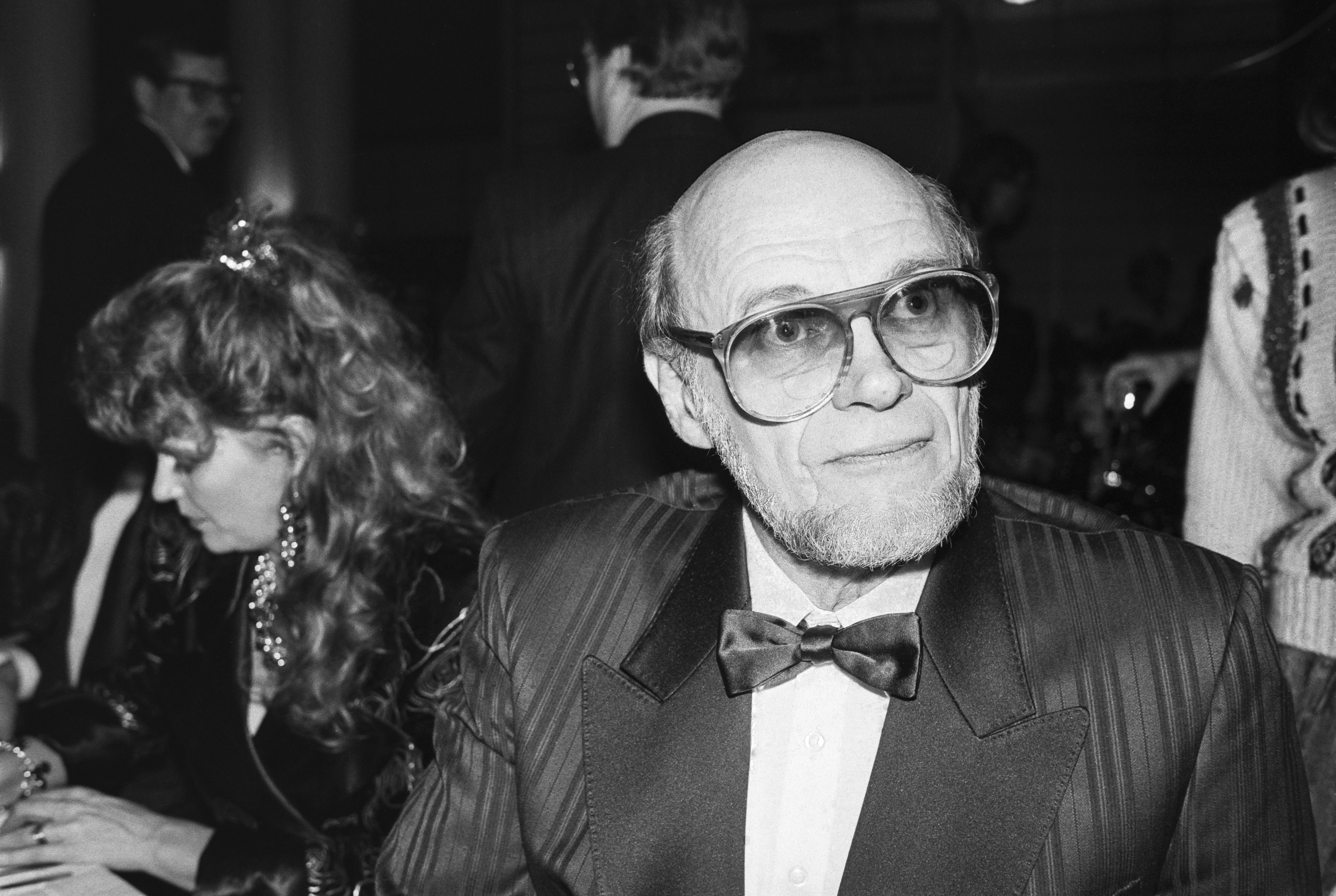
- Spede Pasanen, 1990
- Born: Pertti Olavi Pasanen; 10 April 1930; Kuopio, Finland
- Died: 7 September 2001 (aged 71); Kirkkonummi, Finland
- Occupations: Film director; film and TV producer; screenwriter; entrepreneur; radio comedian; inventor
- Spouse: Pirjo Vainimäki
- Children: Pirre Alanen
- Relatives: Veijo Pasanen (seventh cousin); Kaija Koo (cousin's daughter)
- Awards: Jussi award for best producer 1971; Venla award 1982 and 1985; Concrete Jussi award for life's work 1985 "Eskon puumerkki" award of the Aleksis Kivi Society 1987; Telvis award 1994

Pertti Olavi "Spede" Pasanen (10 April 1930 – 7 September 2001) was a Finnish film director and producer, comedian, and inventor, who has been called an "all-around entertainer". During his career he directed, wrote, produced or acted in about 50 movies and participated in numerous TV productions, including the comedy Spede Show and the game-show Speden Spelit. Much of his more commercial work was in collaboration with Vesa-Matti Loiri (whose most popular character created by Pasanen was Uuno Turhapuro; first in TV sketches and then in a long-lasting series of motion pictures) and Simo Salminen. Pasanen's films and TV shows, often made quickly and on a low budget, usually received little critical recognition but were popular among Finnish audiences from the 1960s onwards. He was the owner of his own film production company, Filmituotanto Spede Pasanen Ky. Pasanen was ranked 17th at the Suuret suomalaiset competition show broadcast by Yleisradio.

== Childhood and youth ==
Pertti Olavi Pasanen was born on 10 April 1930 in Kuopio, to Kusti and Helmi Pasanen (née Rantala). His father was a forestry technician and worked as the district chief of the paper company Ahlström. Other children in the family included Pertti's little sister Virpi and little brother Risto. Pasanen's family lived in the Linnanpelto district. By Kuopio standards, the family was of upper middle class. The nickname "Spede" comes from an earlier nickname "Speedy" which he got from playing ice hockey, and was given to him at an early age. The nickname "Speedy" came from the fictional mouse character Speedy Gonzales, the hero of Warner Brothers' Looney Tunes and Merrie Melodies.

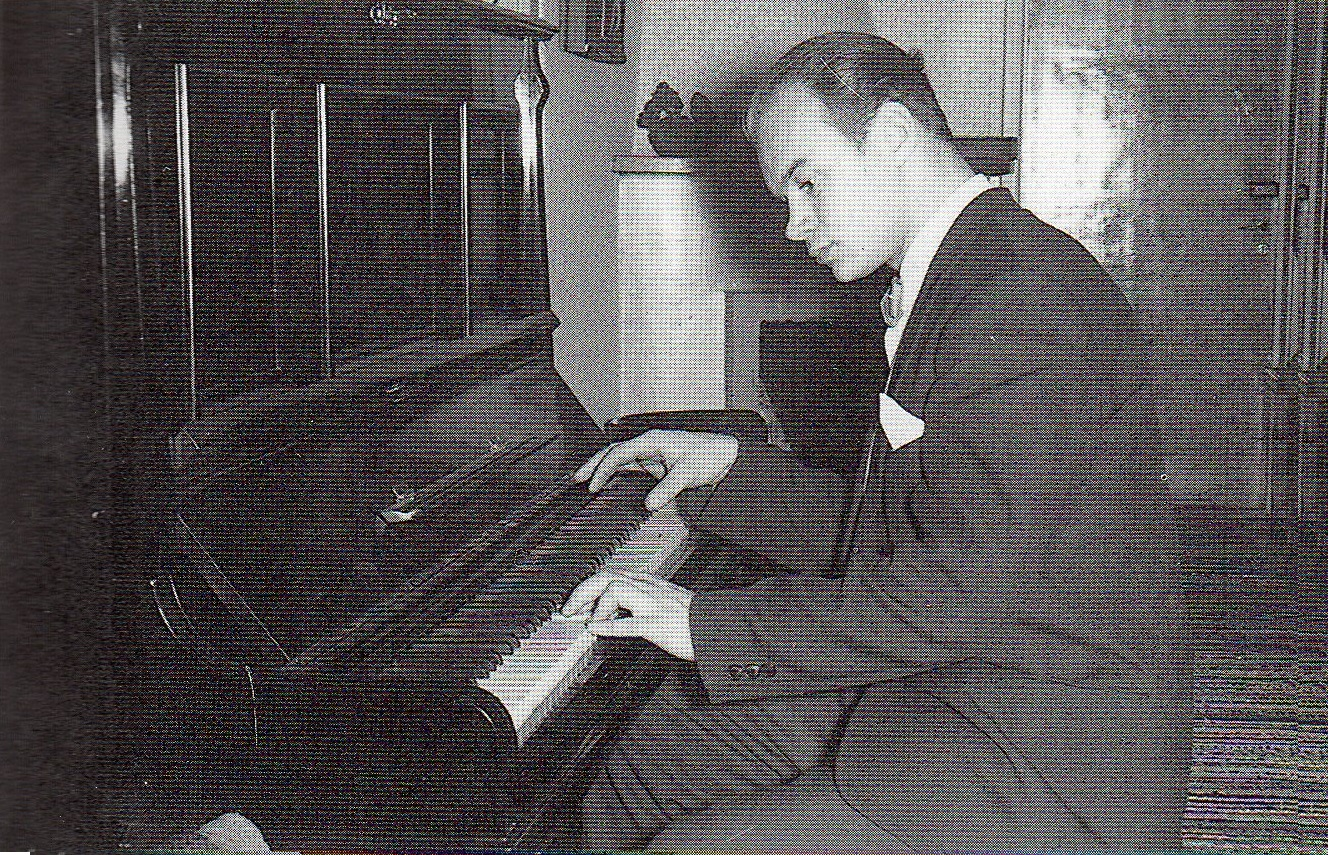
Young Pasanen playing the piano in the late 1940s or early 1950s

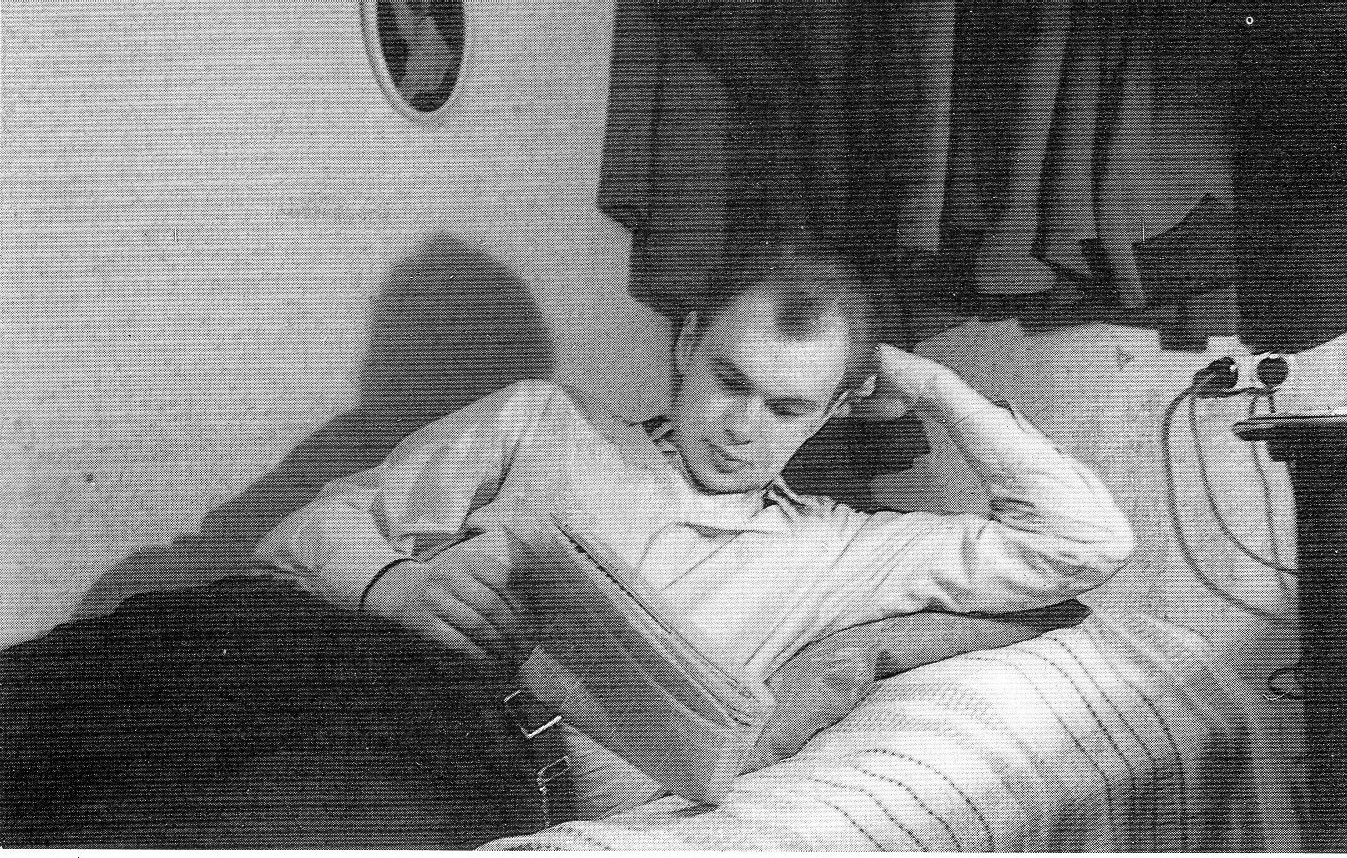
Young Pasanen in his student apartment in the 1950s

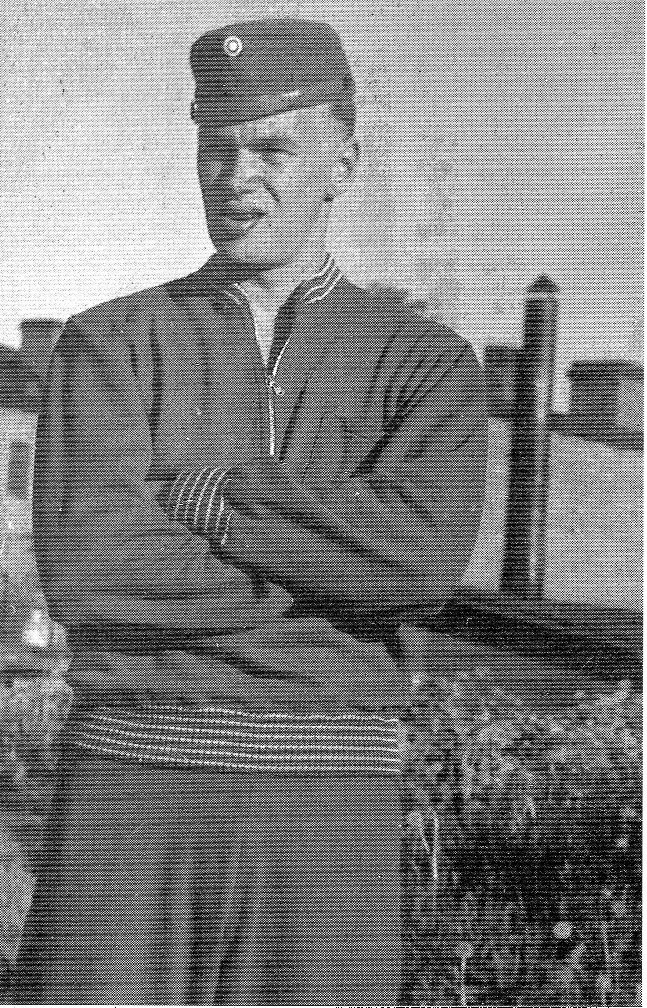
Spede Pasanen during his military service in the early 1950s

Pasanen's interests at school age included entertainment, sports, various games and inventions. He was the star of the Kuopio Lyceum's evening programs, played ice hockey with passion and performed chemical experiments in his home's basement. However, he did badly at school. In spring 1948 he got a report card with five 4 grades (a failing grade in the Finnish school system) and stayed behind in his class after spending most of the spring building a custom scooter from parts he had found in junk shops. After Pertti Pasanen had ended up in arguments with most of his teachers, his parents sent him to another school. In autumn 1950 Spede Pasanen moved to the Iisalmi lyceum, from where he matriculated in the Olympic spring of 1952. He spent the next year doing his military service and completed it with the rank of Sub-lieutenant in the anti-aircraft branch. In the military he also performed in the entertainment parade of the defence forces, which circulated between barracks entertaining soldiers.

In autumn 1953 Pasanen moved to Helsinki and started his studies at the Faculty of State Politics at the University of Helsinki. Instead of studying, he concentrated on social life at the Nation of Savonia, where he usually acted as host and master of ceremonies at parties. Pasanen's student indoctrinations and initiations of new students gained fame throughout the university. In the university he also met Jukka Virtanen and Matti Kuusla who became important partners for him. Kuusla, working at Fennada-Filmi as a studio assistant got him a background role in the 1954 film Laivan kannella. He appeared in the film as a man at a bar.

== Career ==
=== Radio career ===
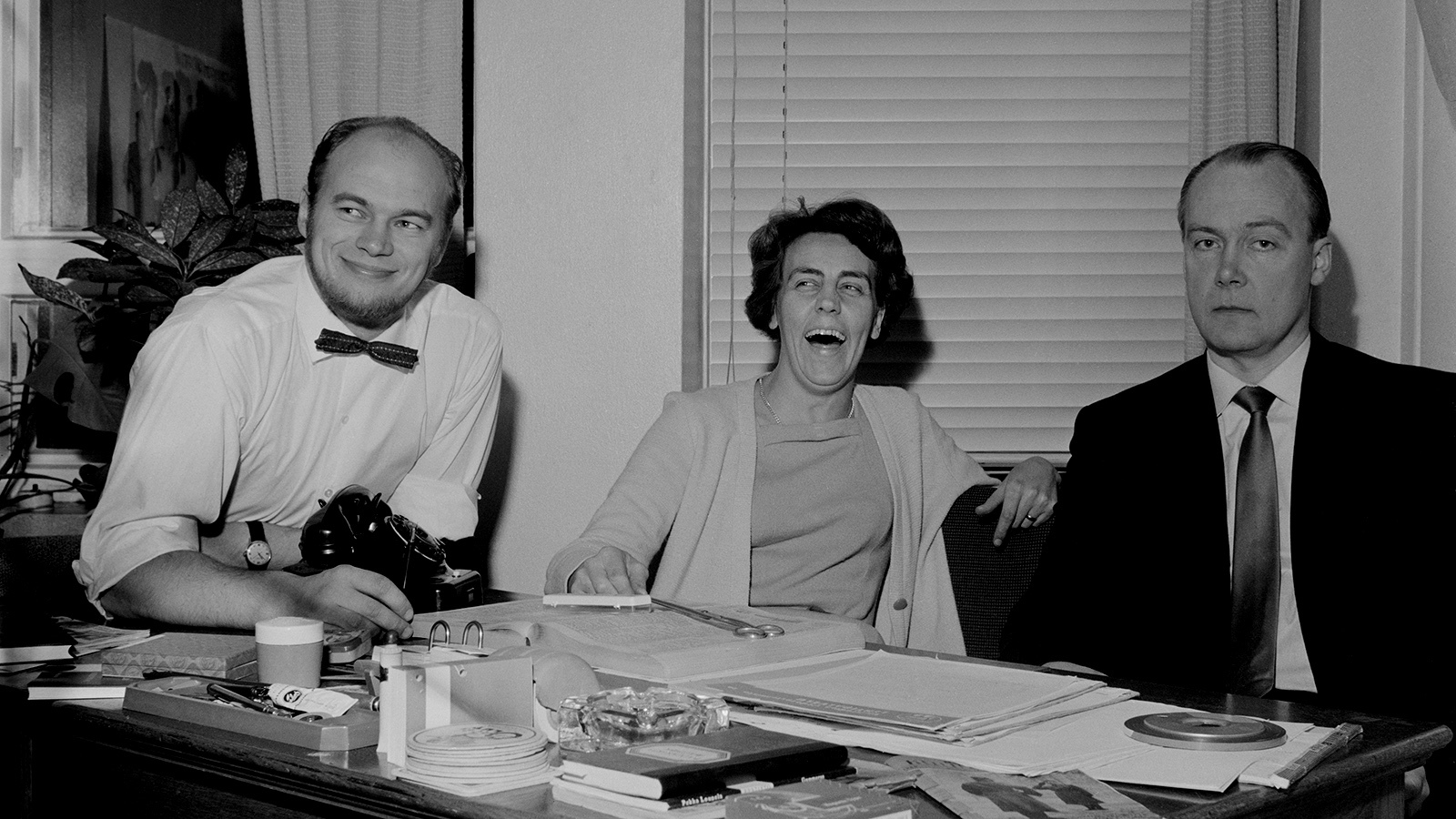
Pertti Pasanen (left) with Aune Haarla and Antero Alpola at Yleisradio's entertainment division in 1960.

During the late 1950s and early 1960s Spede was a noted presence as a radio comedian. He applied to work at Yleisradio twice in 1956 and again in 1959 as an entertainment provider (ajanvietetoimittaja). On the first try Aune Ala-Tuuhonen, a secretary of the entertainment board and an experienced entertainment scriptwriter, was hired instead of Pasanen. Pasanen applied again in 1959 when the popular Niilo Tarvajärvi moved over to television. Pasanen sent another application which was almost completely identical to his first one, and attached a note "my folder is already there". This time he was hired.

Pasanen brought into radio the screwball comedy style he had assumed in the conventions at the Iisalmi Lyceum and at student nation parties. He was inspired by American film comedians such as Bob Hope, Jerry Lewis and Danny Kaye and wanted to bring the swift and clever style of American comedy into Finnish radio. He felt right at home in front of a live audience and hosted live performances with ease, whereas many other entertainment providers feared them. Pasanen started his radio career by hosting Tarvajärvi's former program Aamutuimaan broadcast on Sunday mornings, and according to the chief of the entertainment division Antero Alpola the program soon became "Spede's personal crazy show produced almost entirely without helping staff".

The names of the programs varied, but the basic idea remained the same: craziness and tricks with words to amaze the listeners. Pasanen's most popular program was Ruljanssiriihi which combined sketch-comedy and musical performances. The program eventually developed into the program Hupiklubi. Pasanen's programs were one-hour-long entertainment shows broadcast on Saturday evenings, combining music, sketch comedy and individual jokes.

Pasanen and actor Leo Jokela also created the break-out character G. Pula-Aho (voiced by Jokela), a smart-talking, Helsinki slang speaking parrot who would insult Pasanen on Ruljanssiriihi. Pasanen invented Pula-aho's style of talking when he asked Jokela to imitate the quiz show host Tauno Rautiainen. In the sketches, Jokela played Pula-aho by speaking through gritted teeth, in a manner similar to Rautiainen. This made both Pasanen and Jokela more familiar with the audience. These sketches where the clever parrot unashamedly insulted the show's stupid host became favourites among the audience and tens of episodes were made from 1960 to 1964. Pasanen published a book called Papukaija G. Pula-ahon seikkailut about G. Pula-aho, containing sketches performed by the parrot.

Spede's other programs included Tervahöyry Hyrskynmyrskyn suvisilla laineilla, Hyvää iltaa – tulkaa mukaan and Kesäterässä.

Antero Alpola wrote in his memoirs that he was certain that when Spede Pasanen was hired to the radio, he had not even imagined he would stay there for the whole of his career, but instead it would just be one phase of his personal career: "He was such a personal program creator, that a 'normal' entertainment provider's job just isn't fit for him. He doesn't listen to ready-made tapes by others and make fixes to them, he doesn't create ideas for others, he doesn't sift through scripts. He doesn't contact people unless they are part of his own program. According to my understanding, he isn't even a group performer, even though he works with groups and needs them. The group just serves his purpose."

The radio started becoming cramped for Pasanen in the middle 1960s. He was making more and more of his own entertainment gigs and got into a dispute about his salary with the management board of Yleisradio. This dispute was the main reason why Pasanen quit his job at the radio in 1964 and instead moved wholly to film and television production.

=== Film actor career ===
In autumn 1953 Pasanen moved to Helsinki and started his studies at the Faculty of Government Sciences at the University of Helsinki. Instead of studying, he concentrated on student nation life at the Savonian Nation, where he acted as a general master of ceremonies and organiser of parties. Especially the initiation parties of new students organised by Pasanen gained fame throughout the university and other student nations. At the university he also met Jukka Virtanen and Matti Kuusla, both of which later became important business colleagues for him. In 1954 Kuusla, who had worked as a studio assistant at Fennada-Filmi, got Pasanen a role as a background extra in the film Laivan kannella, where he appeared as a member of a sailors' club.

Already at the Kuopio Lyceum Pasanen had assembled a band called Bluff Brothers, consisting of Pasanen himself as well as Pentti Nevaluoma and later also Matti Kuusla, who joined the band in Helsinki. In the band, Nevaluoma played the guitar, while Pasanen and Kuusla made various noises to mix in with the guitar playing. Bluff Brothers played in Pasanen's own shows and public events. The band split up in 1963 when Nevaluoma moved to Jyväskylä where he founded a restaurant.

In the 1950s, Pasanen got a steady job as an assistant at Fennada-Filmi. After working as a background extra, he got his first significant speaking role in the "Finland Western" film Villi Pohjola directed by Aarne Tarkas in 1955. At the same time, Pasanen was looking for a way to get roles at other film companies as well. During the 1950s he appeared in various background roles in comedies produced both by Fennada-Filmi and Suomen Filmiteollisuus, such as Tyttö lähtee kasarmiin (1956), Vääpelin kauhu (1957) and Asessorin naishuolet (1958). He also auditioned for the part of Antero Rokka in the 1955 film The Unknown Soldier, but the part went to Reino Tolvanen. Armand Lohikoski took Pasanen into minor roles in three Pekka ja Pätkä films: Pekka ja Pätkä ketjukolarissa (1957), Pekka ja Pätkä sammakkomiehinä (1957) and Pekka ja Pätkä Suezilla (1958).

In 1958 Pasanen got a unique role: he appeared in the main role at the Finnish National Ballet's version of the novel Don Quijote by Miguel de Cervantes. The National Ballet was not looking for a ballet dancer as such for the main role, but instead for an actor who was familiar with pantomime and physical comedy, and Pasanen had made an impression on the choreographer George Gé at the audition. The ballet Don Quijote became a great success for the Finnish National Opera and Ballet in 1958. The production also visited Germany during the same year, which also became Pasanen's first trip abroad in his life.

Mikko Niskanen's film Hopeaa rajan takaa (1963) was an important point in Pasanen's career: his first and only main role in a serious film, and his final role in a film produced by someone else. Despite the seriousness of the film, Pasanen played the part of Toivo Paukku, the most comical role in the film, always singing and longing after women. Since the late 1950s Pasanen started a career at the radio and television.

=== Film director career ===
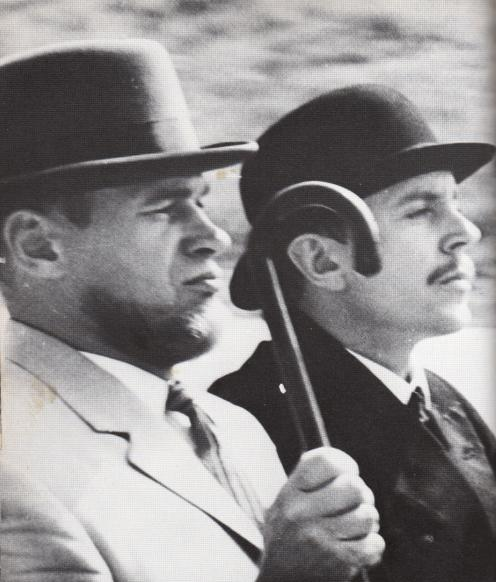
Pasanen and Jaakko Pakkasvirta in the scene of the 1964 film X-Paroni

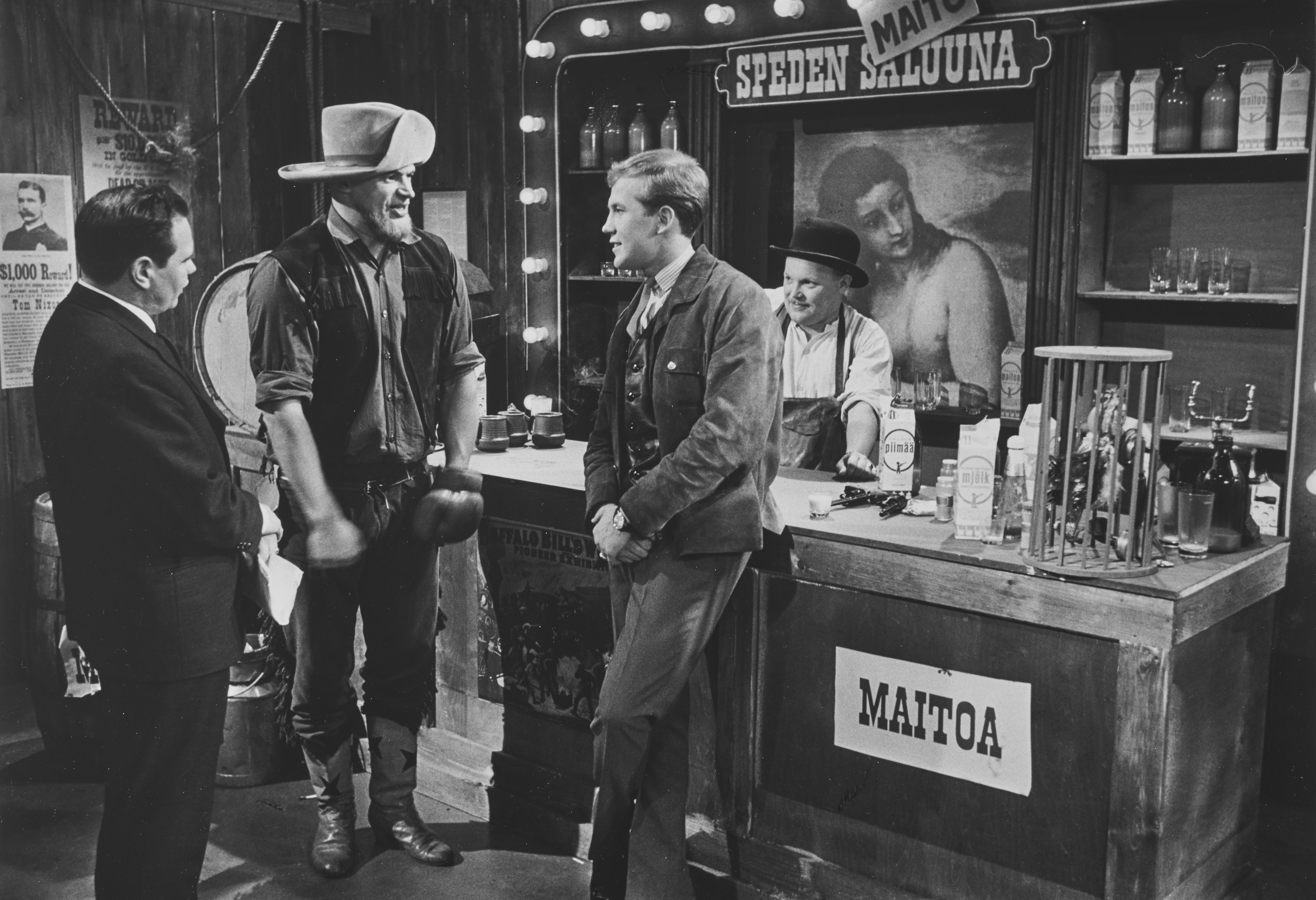
Speden Saluuna in 1965

Spede Pasanen and Jaakko Pakkasvirta met each other at the shooting of the film Hopeaa rajan takaa. Pakkasvirta and Risto Jarva, two young filmmakers, were part of the key personnel at the film production company Filminor owned by the student body of the Helsinki University of Technology. Their debut film Yö ja päivä (1962) had caused a great loss for the company. Jarva and Pakkasvirta made a contract with Pasanen about a new comedy film which could be a great success. According to the contract, Filminor would handle the technical aspects of the film, while Pasanen would get the financing, create the content and personally act in the main role. This resulted in the comedy X-Paroni (1964) which was the most successful film in Finland in the year of its debut.

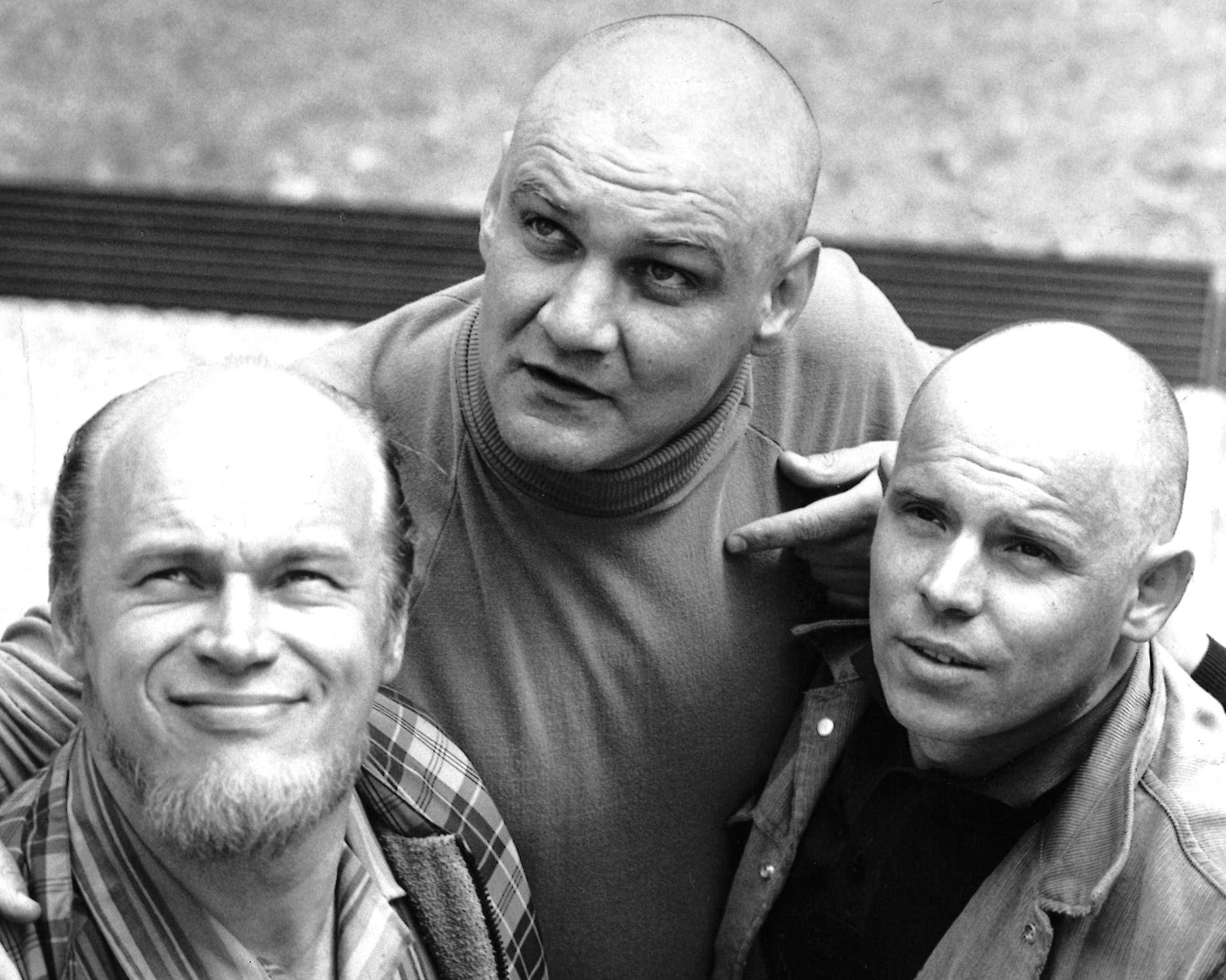
Pasanen, Virtanen and Kokkonen in 1968.

The film's success encouraged Pasanen to go into business for himself and thus he founded a company called Filmituotanto Spede Pasanen. He chose his old friend Jukka Virtanen and the young director Ere Kokkonen from Mainostelevisio as his business partners. The trio Pasanen-Virtanen-Kokkonen soon started producing a series of successful comedies including Millipilleri (1966), the parodical film celebrating the 50th anniversary of Finland's independence Pähkähullu Suomi (1967), the Finnish version of Robin Hood About Seven Brothers (1968) and the television satire Näköradiomiehen ihmeelliset siekailut (1969). Millipilleri also introduced moviegoers to Simo Salminen who became a fixture of Spede's acting troupe, often playing the side-kick to Spede's own characters. It was also the first movie Spede co-directed with Jukka Virtanen and Ere Kokkonen who would alternate directing Spede's future motion pictures, while Spede focused more on writing and producing. With his films in the 1960s Pasanen established himself as the most popular comedian in Finland.

The 1967 period-comedy About Seven Brothers was a parody of Robin Hood which Spede had worked on since the 1950s and introduced Vesa-Matti Loiri as an adult actor (having made his on-screen debut years earlier as a child actor in Pojat). The success of these movies led to Spede producing and releasing three movies in 1969, Näköradiomiehen ihmeelliset siekailut, Leikkikalugangsteri as well as his first colour feature Pohjan Tähteet. Näköradiomies performed well despite being a more serious movie but it and Pohjan Tähteet underperformed in comparison to the more typically comical Leikkikalugangsteri.

Pohjan Tähteet made a loss and was expensive to produce. Pasanen was in no hurry to switch to colour film, as he wanted his films to make as much money as possible. He kept making black-and-white films up to 1978.

Despite Pohjan Tähteet winning a shared Jussi Award for Kari Sohlberg in the category of best cinematography (with Spede's own Leikkikalugangsteri and Jörn Donner's Sixtynine 69), Pasanen did not produce another colour feature until the late 1970s.

Jukka Virtanen left the company after Näköradiomies but Ere Kokkonen became Pasanen's closest business partner for the whole of his film career. At the same time Pasanen also found two men who became his trusted actors in both film and television: Simo Salminen who had already played a part in X-Paroni and Vesa-Matti Loiri whose debut was in About Seven Brothers.

Spede continued to experience success with Speedy Gonzales – noin 7 veljeksen poika and the tragic comedy Jussi Pussi both released in 1970. Speedy Gonzales performed well, despite Vesa-Matti Loiri being absent due to a leg injury just prior to shooting (he instead received a writing credit). Spede had to finance most of his films during this period due to his poor relations with the Finnish Film Foundation. Jussi Pussi was written and directed by Kokkonen, while Pasanen was responsible for the production but did not appear in the film and was not interested in the plot. The film is completely unlike Pasanen's previous films, as it is more romantic and melancholic than Pasanen's earlier screwball comedies. The film is about the great love between two penniless students during the political and sexual student radicalism of its time. The film gathered about 167 thousand viewers, which was enough to cover the production costs.

Speedy Gonzales was based on the themes of the American Old West, which had been a favourite of Pasanen already in his childhood. Pasanen found suitable shooting scenes at the sand pits in Hyrylä and on the sandy beaches of Yyteri. Pasanen himself played the role of the lead character Speedy Gonzales, the fastest gun in the west. One day the producers were shooting a scene where the sheriff played by Leo Jokela sneaks up behind Speedy Gonzales, sticks a gun on his back and the hero lifts his arms up. Then another villain points his revolver at the sheriff, and some other person points his at the villain. This results in a queue where about twenty men each point their gun at the man in front of him. Virtanen commented to Pasanen that they can't make such a scene as the Marx Brothers had already done such a scene in their 1940 classic film Go West. Pasanen had never heard of this film. According to Virtanen, Pasanen did not need inspiration, as his ideas were entirely his own. The film was a financial success and made a profit of 45 thousand markka. Pasanen's company managed to pay off its earlier losses, but at the same time, Pasanen and Kokkonen got into arguments for many years.

In 1971, Spede released three motion-pictures, Kahdeksas Veljes (his debut as a solo director) and Hirttämättömät (the sequel to Speedy Gonzales) both starring himself as well as Saatanan Radikaalit, which was co-directed by its four starring actors Paavo Piironen, Heikki Nousiainen, Timo Nissi and Heikki Huopainen, all fresh from the Helsinki Theatre Academy. Spede only produced this film which was intended to give its four stars a chance to complete a motion-picture on their own. All three films under-performed, with Saatanan Radikaalit being the financial all-time low of Pasanen's career so far. This led to Spede taking a two-year hiatus from film-making during which he focused exclusively on his TV work. Regardless, Spede won the 1971 Producers' Jussi Award for all three films. Pasanen started planning a new colour film and to his surprise, he got a loan of 75 thousand markka from the Finnish Film Foundation. In the end, this film was left unfilmed, and another film that Pasanen had in mind was also left at planning stage. Pasanen ended up using the loan to cover the losses caused by Hirttämättömät.

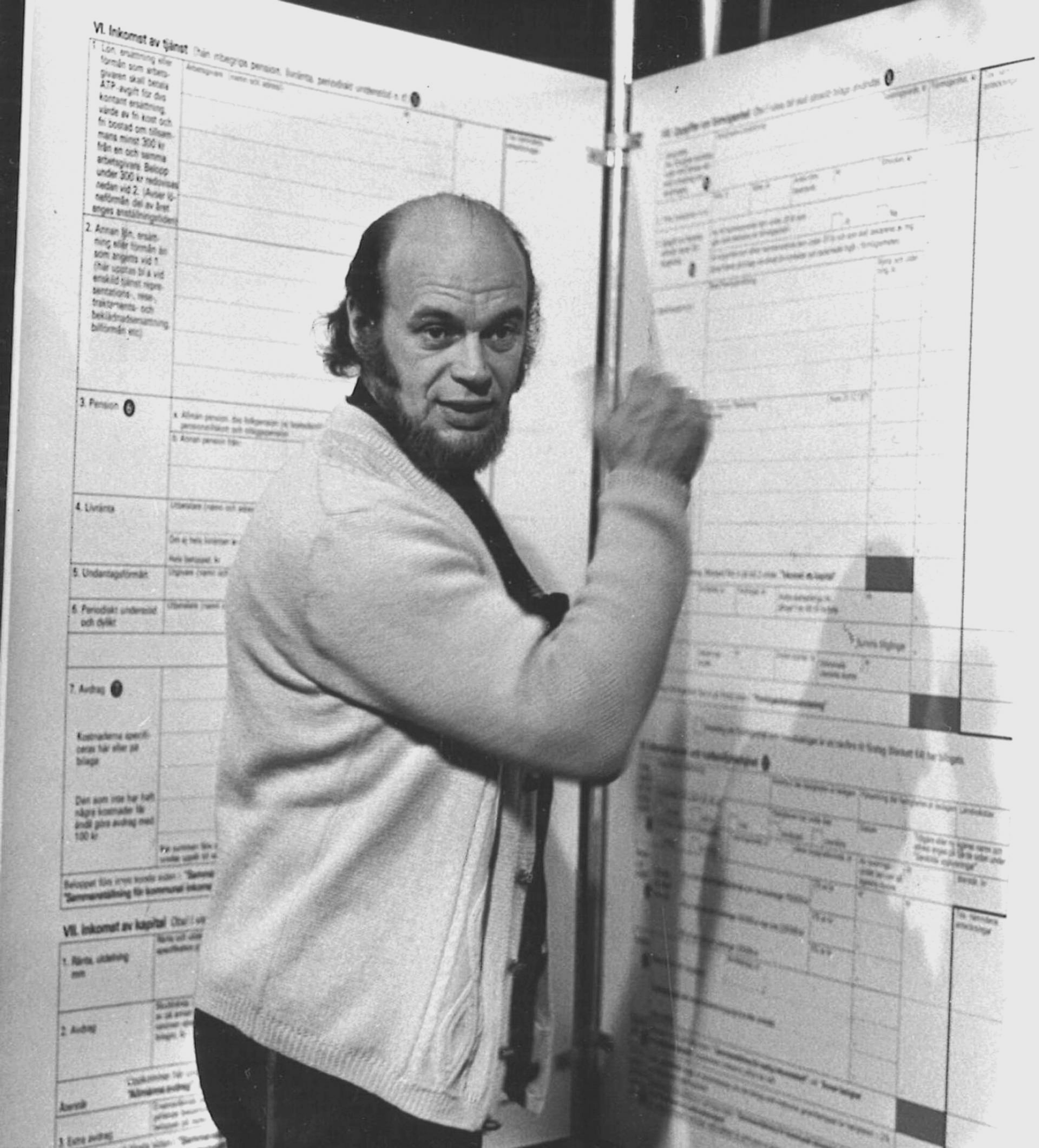
Pertti “Spede” Pasanen in a Swedish television show, instructing Finnish expatriates in Sweden to fill in their tax declaration in 1972.

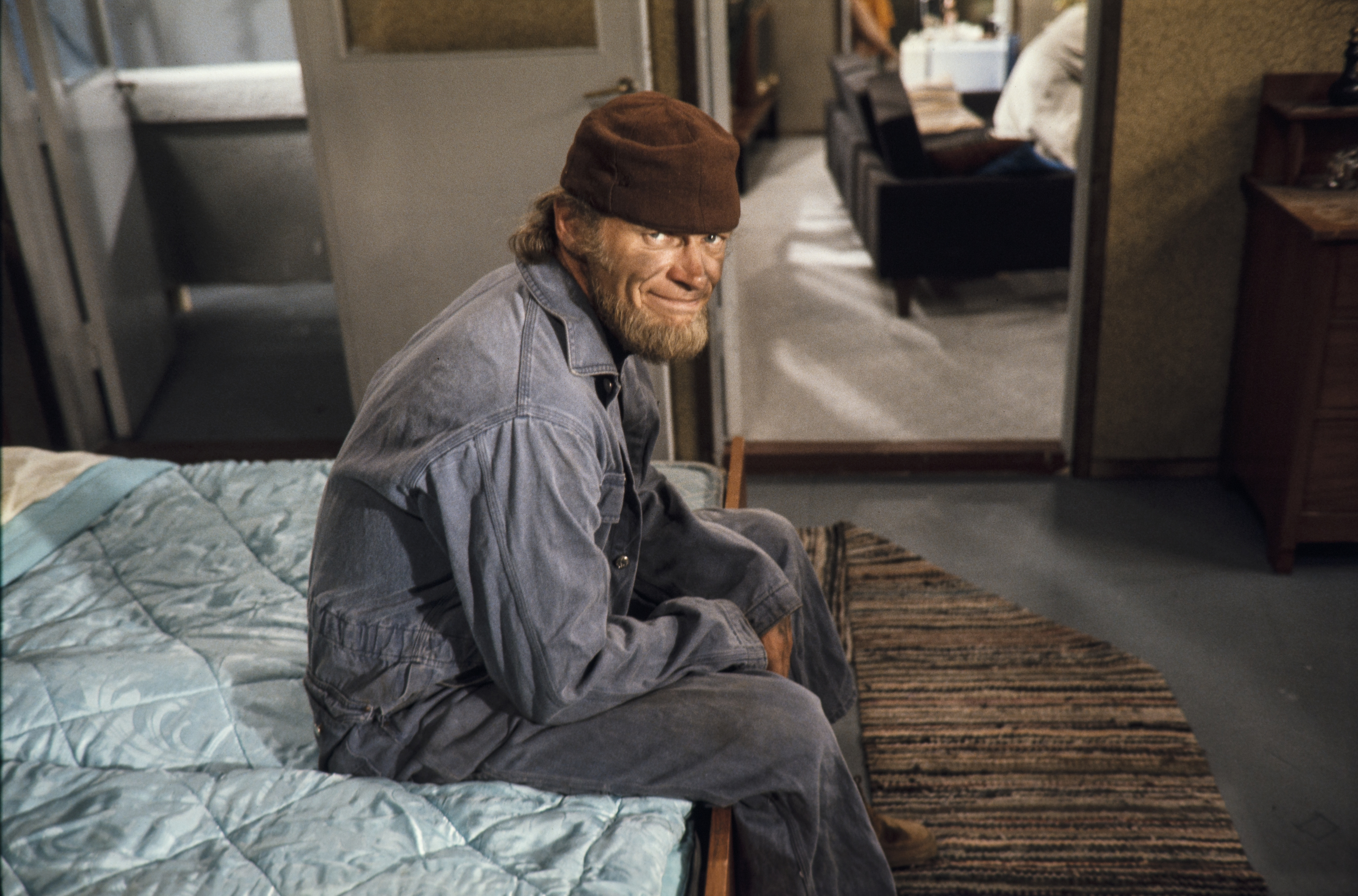
Pasanen as Härski Hartikainen in the film set of the first Uuno Turhapuro film (1973)

In 1973, Spede released the first Uuno Turhapuro movie based on the popular skit-character by the same name. To save costs, Spede filmed and edited the movie entirely on video and had it transferred to film for theatrical distribution. Uuno became a hit and a further four Uuno films were finished during the 1970s. Spede resumed filming small budget comedies with 1974's Viu-Hah-Hah-Taja, directed by Ere Kokkonen and mostly starring Spede's TV actors. Spede only appeared in a cameo and went uncredited as the film's writer. In 1979, he released Koeputkiaikuinen ja Simon enkelit, his first colour feature since Pohjantähteet. The movie was a surprise hit and led to a sequel Tup Akka Lakko being released the following year.

In the 1980s, the Uuno series peaked in popularity with 1984's Uuno Turhapuro armeijan leivissä breaking the record of the most popular Finnish domestic film. Spede cranked out movies on an annual basis, using his stock actors and frequently utilizing the popular skit characters for movies such as Kliffaa Hei, Pikkupojat, Fakta Homma and Onks Viljoo Näkyny. The last of these skit-comedy films is considered to be 1990s Rampe & Naukkis - Kaikkien aikojen superpari, which was lampooned on the popular characters created by Pirkka-Pekka Petelius and Aake Kalliala for the TV show Pulttibois.

During the 1990s, Spede focused almost exclusively on producing rather than writing or directing films with TV work taking more and more of his time. By this point his relationship with the Finnish Film Foundation had improved and he received grants for most of his films. The final movie directed by Pasanen was Naisen Logiikka, released in 1999 though production of it began in 1992. The film was hastily completed for release to prevent Pasanen from having to pay back his grant for the movie.

In his films, Pasanen never made fun of religion, his fatherland or politicians. He thought it was a matter of honour to make films for the whole family, and the films never showed any nudity or contained any profanity.

=== TV career ===
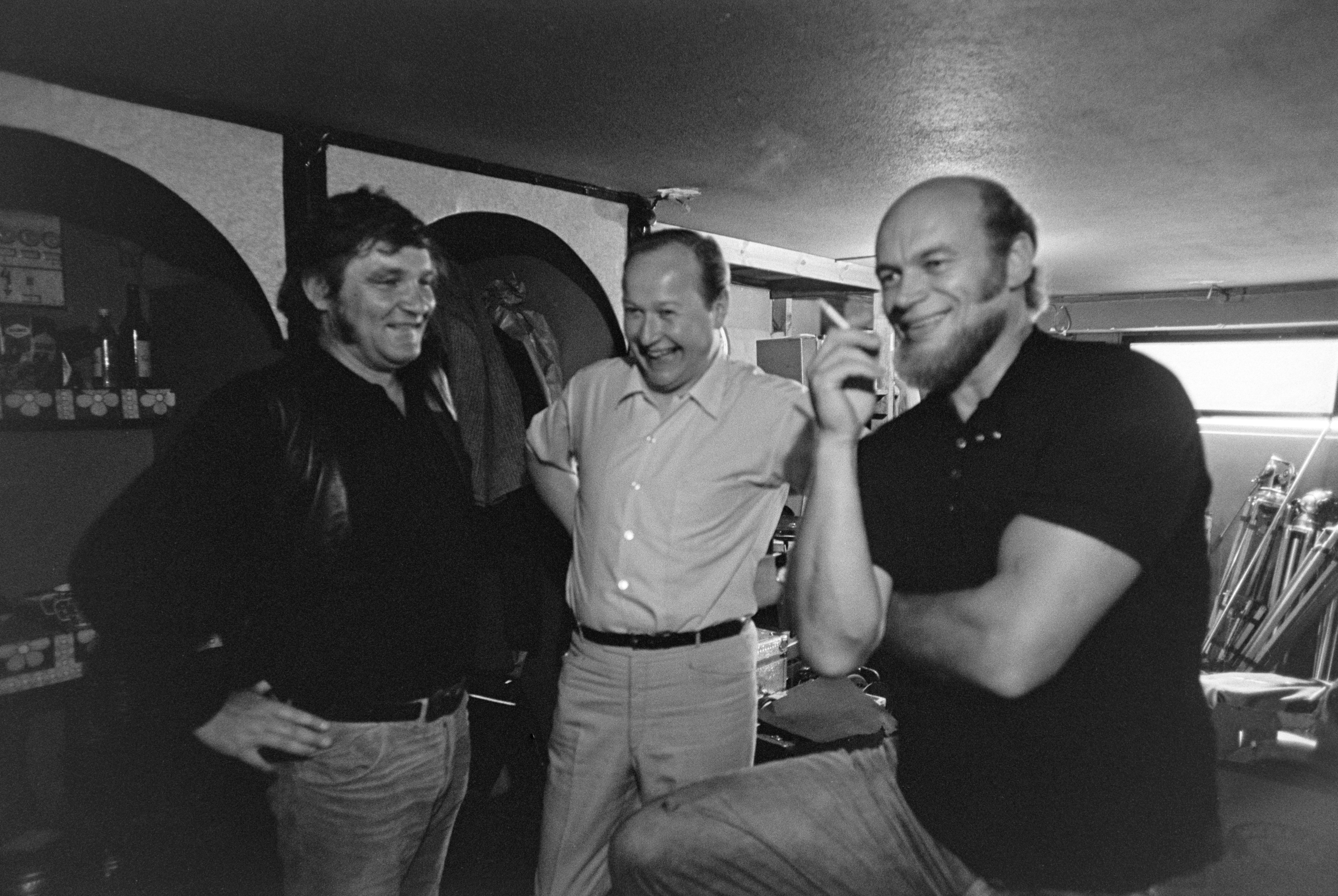
Left actor Jukka Virtanen, composer Jaakko Salo and Spede Pasanen

Pasanen's television career started from visits in commercials for lottery tickets and beer, which brought out his talents as a comedian. However, the director of the advertisement studio that had filmed the commercials featuring him announced he could not stand the "Spede style", so Pasanen made a suggestion to Mainostelevisio to make a program all of his own.

Starting from 1964, Pasanen began making live 15-minute sketch programming for Yleisradio produced by Mainos-TV, in addition to his film career. The first of these shows was called Spede Show (1964), followed by Speden Saluuna (1965), Spedevisio (1965 to 1970) and 50 pientä minuuttia (1967 to 1971). Only parts of these early Pasanen shows have survived, because MTV3 could not afford many expensive picture tapes and thus had to record new shows on top of old ones.

The show which alternated between the titles Spedevisio, Speden Saluuna as well as Spede Show established many of the tropes and core actors whom Spede would use in his films. Most of the early skit work is now lost due to live broadcasts not being routinely recorded. Spede appeared on TV continuously until 1976 when he started to focus primarily on film work.

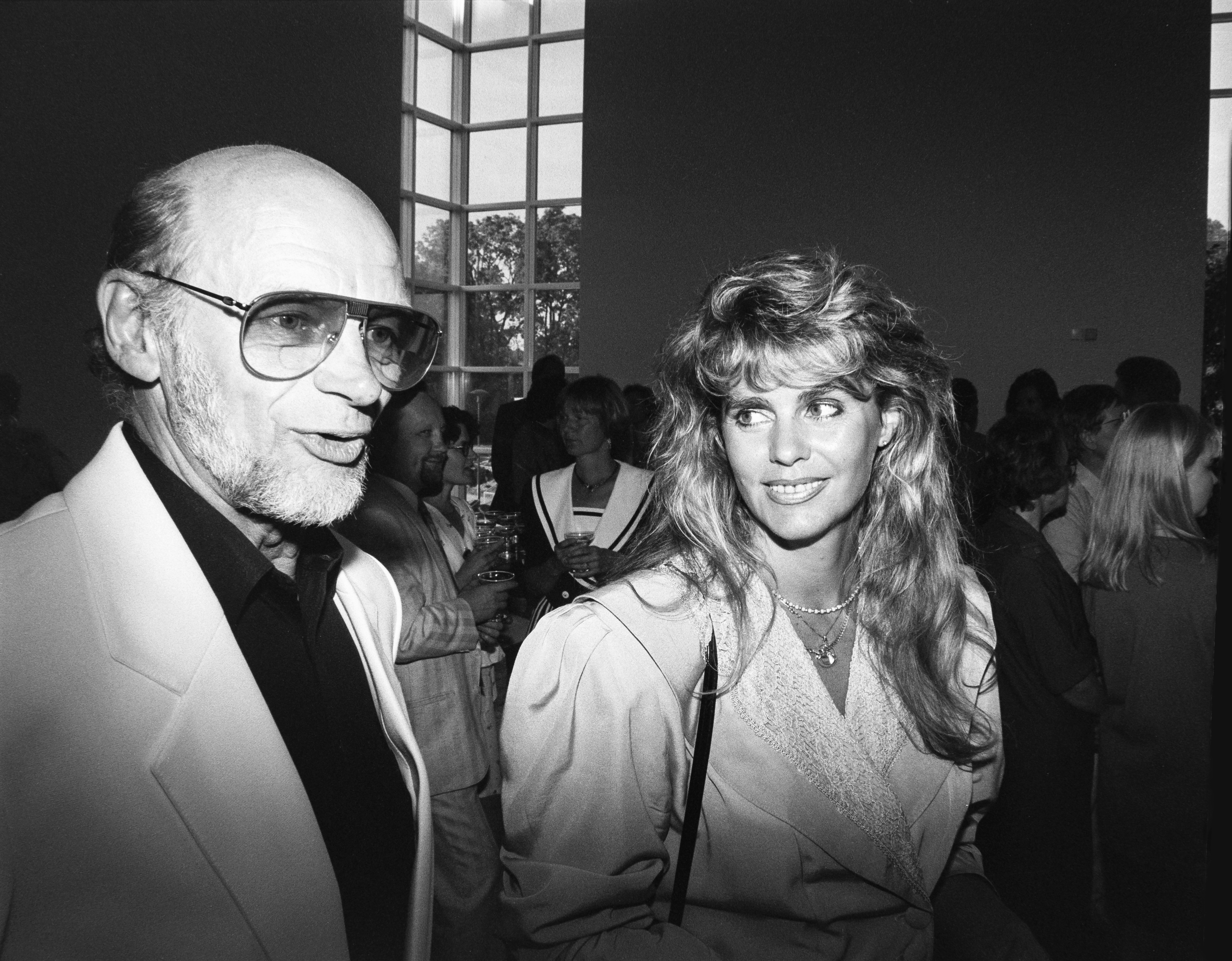
Pasanen and Riitta Väisänen in 1993.

Starting from 1981, Spede once again put priority on TV work. First airing surviving black and white skits on YLE. He began making new skits in 1984 with Spede, Simo Salminen and Vesa-Matti Loiri. Hannele Lauri also joined as a regular cast-member. Mainos-TV also moved Spede's programming to the newly formed Kolmoskanava channel. The new Spede Show continued to air until 1987 when Spede and Loiri had a mock-feud which led to the launch of Vesa-Matti Loiri's own TV sketch show, Vesku Show. Throughout the 1980s, Spede also produced other programs such as the comedy program Fakta Homma and the competition show Kymppitonni with host Riitta Väisänen.

Pasanen sought a regular performance partner for his comedy sketches whose physical build contrasted Pasanen's study one. He considered several actors, including Matti Kuusla, who was already running an entertainment company with Jukka Virtanen and Aarre Elo. He ultimately chose Simo Salminen, who also known as a show jumper in the 1960s. Their professional partnership started from the television and continued well up to the 1990s.

By the 1990s, Spede was himself tired of sketch-work but produced Aake Kalliala's and Pirkka-Pekka Petelius's Pulttibois and Tsa Tsa Tsaa as well as the sporty competition show Speden Spelit. Pasanen also produced more drama-programming such as Hynttyyt Yhteen, Blondi tuli taloon (The Blonde That Came to the House), and Ihmeiden tekijät (as well as its follow-up, Parhaat Vuodet). Many of these shows became stables of MTV3 with many of them airing for several seasons. Spede also approved the production of the dramedy-series Kuumia Aaltoja, which aired in 2003 (two years after his death).

Television brought a new dimension to Pasanen's comedy, because he no longer had to make do with the aural acrobatics of the radio. Pasanen had a principle of defining the limits of good taste himself. The sketch shows were always made with the content first and without any definite overall view, and Pasanen seldom paid attention to the filming or other artistic viewpoints. Spede Show remained on television up to 1974.

=== 1970s ===
Since the latter half of the 1960s Spede Pasanen made comedy films he had written himself under his own production company almost every year; often he would make two or three films during the same year. In front of the camera he took a minor role and made Vesa-Matti Loiri the star of the Uuno Turhapuro films. Only male actors performed comedy in Pasanen's films. According to Marjatta Raita who played Uuno's wife, Pasanen had the opinion that women were not allowed to be funny. Because of this, Pasanen thought of women either as beautiful decorations or as formidable battle-axes.

The character Uuno Turhapuro played by Loiri, who had already starred earlier in the Spede Show in 1971, soon became a popular sketch character. Pasanen invented the character and Loiri designed his make-up. Uuno has been called the lovechild of Pasanen and Loiri. The character appeared in about 20 sketches until Pasanen started thinking if there would be enough material for a film. He began making a script and managed to entice Ere Kokkonen back to his team. Kokkonen agreed mostly because the film was shot with multiple cameras and Loiri starred in the lead role. The film Uuno Turhapuro was shot in summer 1973 and became a huge success: over half a million viewers. The plot was multi-faceted and was essentially a collection of sketches. The Turhapuro films showed the debut of the character Härski Hartikainen invented and played by Pasanen, the character became one of his most famous roles.

Pasanen quit his ten-year-old TV show in 1974 after getting in an argument with the show director. He concentrated on his films and inventions instead. He thought of Loiri as professionally irreplaceable and would have wanted him to all of his projects, but Loiri had his own family and job in Turku to take care of. Pasanen contemplated taking a year off from making films, but instead decided to make a film about the new fashion of streaking with new stars. The film Viu-hah hah-taja was made in 1974 starring the comedians Seppo Laine and Jyrki Kovaleff, who had appeared earlier on the Spede Show. Pasanen did not intend to make a sequel to the Turhapuro film, but after its huge success, he reconsidered the possibility. The film Viu-hah hah-taja had made a considerable profit, but Pasanen did not see it as a full hit considering its content. Pasanen understood that the public was fond of the Turhapuro character, so from 1975 to 1978 he wrote and produced a new Turhapuro film every year, and they were huge successes each. The films were shot at a fast pace and production costs were kept low, and because of this the films are of poor technical quality.

After the fifth Turhapuro film the series was shelved for a while, as Pasanen and Kokkonen got into arguments behind the scenes. Pasanen distanced himself from the films and in 1979 he made a new film Koeputkiaikuinen ja Simon enkelit without Kokkonen as a director. In this film Pasanen put himself back in the lead role. The film was a parody of contemporary foreign news: the first test tube baby had been born in 1978 and the television show Charlie's Angels was very popular at the time. The film gathered almost half a million viewers. Pasanen made a sequel for it in the same pattern called Tup-akka-lakko, inspired by Pasanen once again failing to quit smoking.

=== 1980s ===
The film is my medium. I enjoy making films, if I feel they are needed.
- Spede Pasanen in Helsingin Sanomat in 1990

In 1981 Pasanen publicly expressed his frustration at the Finnish Film Foundation not granting financial support for his films despite his applications. As a concrete proof of this he threatened to destroy all the film negatives of his first three films. He even went as far as to invite a newspaper photographer to witness the fulfilment of his threat. Ilta-Sanomat wrote prominently about it right on the front page and in the article itself with a series of photographs, where Pasanen cut up a series of film reels into pieces with an axe at the floor of his storage room. A new scandal happened in September 1982 when Pasanen accused the Finnish Film Foundation of playing favourites. According to him, the foundation only granted support to those films whose producer was a member of the board at the foundation. Later it became apparent that when the photographer was present, Pasanen had only really destroyed a couple of ready-to-show film reels of his films while the original negatives had survived. This allowed Pasanen to add further drama to his one-man protest.

Both the Turhapuro films and all other produced entertainment was strictly only business to Pasanen, and he wanted to make a profit from them. Already in the 1970s his fortune was massive, and in 1983 he sold off his shares of his television and film companies to MTV. At that time, Spede-yhtiöt consisted of ten different limited companies, including Filmituotanto Spede Pasanen Oy, Amusement Films Oy and Funny Films Oy. Pasanen continued as the CEO of the new fusion company and wanted to hire Ere Kokkonen who had moved over to MTV as the chief of production. Kokkonen agreed on the condition that he would be allowed to write the scripts of any future Turhapuro films himself.

In 1982 Pasanen planned on restarting Spede Show, but Vesa-Matti Loiri's problems with time prevented this. Two collective episodes of Spede Show were made in the spring of the same year, showing old black-and-white sketches and intermediary speeches by Pasanen, Simo Salminen and Vesa-Matti Loiri in colour. A new Spede Show in colour started in 1984, which became a favourite among both the public and the critics and also became a competitor for Velipuolikuu broadcast by Yleisradio. In the new Spede Show Pasanen once again assumed a minor role and put Vesa-Matti Loiri in the spotlight, allowing him to bring one of his most popular characters, Nasse-setä, into the show. The show received many television awards and Pasanen was also awarded the Telvis prize in 1985. In the late 1980s Pasanen also started producing programs that he did not appear in himself or otherwise have much of an effect on the content. Among the most popular of these sketch shows are Vesku Show (1988 to 1991) and Pulttibois (1989 to 1991).

The 1980s were a golden era for the Uuno Turhapuro films and they became the biggest commercial successes for Pasanen. A total of eight Turhapuro films were made from 1981 to 1988, of which five were written by Pasanen. Pasanen had to direct one of these films, Uuno Turhapuro – kaksoisagentti, all by himself after he had got into an argument with Kokkonen. As well as the Turhapuro films, Pasanen produced so-called "secondary productions" according to his contract with MTV. Among these were for example Lentävät luupäät (1984) and Liian iso keikka (1986). Many of these secondary productions were based on characters familiar from television shows. Among these were Hei kliffaa hei (1985), Pikkupojat (1986), Fakta homma (1987), Onks Viljoo näkynyt (1988) and Rampe & Naukkis – kaikkien aikojen superpari (1990).

In 1986, a video game called Uuno Turhapuro muuttaa maalle for the Commodore 64 based on Pasanen's film with the same name was published, programmed by Pasi Hytönen and published by Amersoft. This was the first video game based on a film licence of a Finnish film. The game sold about 2000 copies and was never published outside Finland. Although the game was made with an official licence from Spede Pasanen, Pasanen himself was not involved in the development.

=== Games and quizzes ===
Pasanen stopped producing Spede Show in December 1987 and instead started producing new shows about his lifelong passion: various games. Pasanen invented and designed one of the longest-lived quiz shows in the history of Finnish television, Kymppitonni, in 1984, when the pilot episodes of the show were shot. Kymppitonni was shown on MTV3 from January 1985 to November 2005, after which it has been shown on SuomiTV from 2009 to 2011.

=== 1990s ===
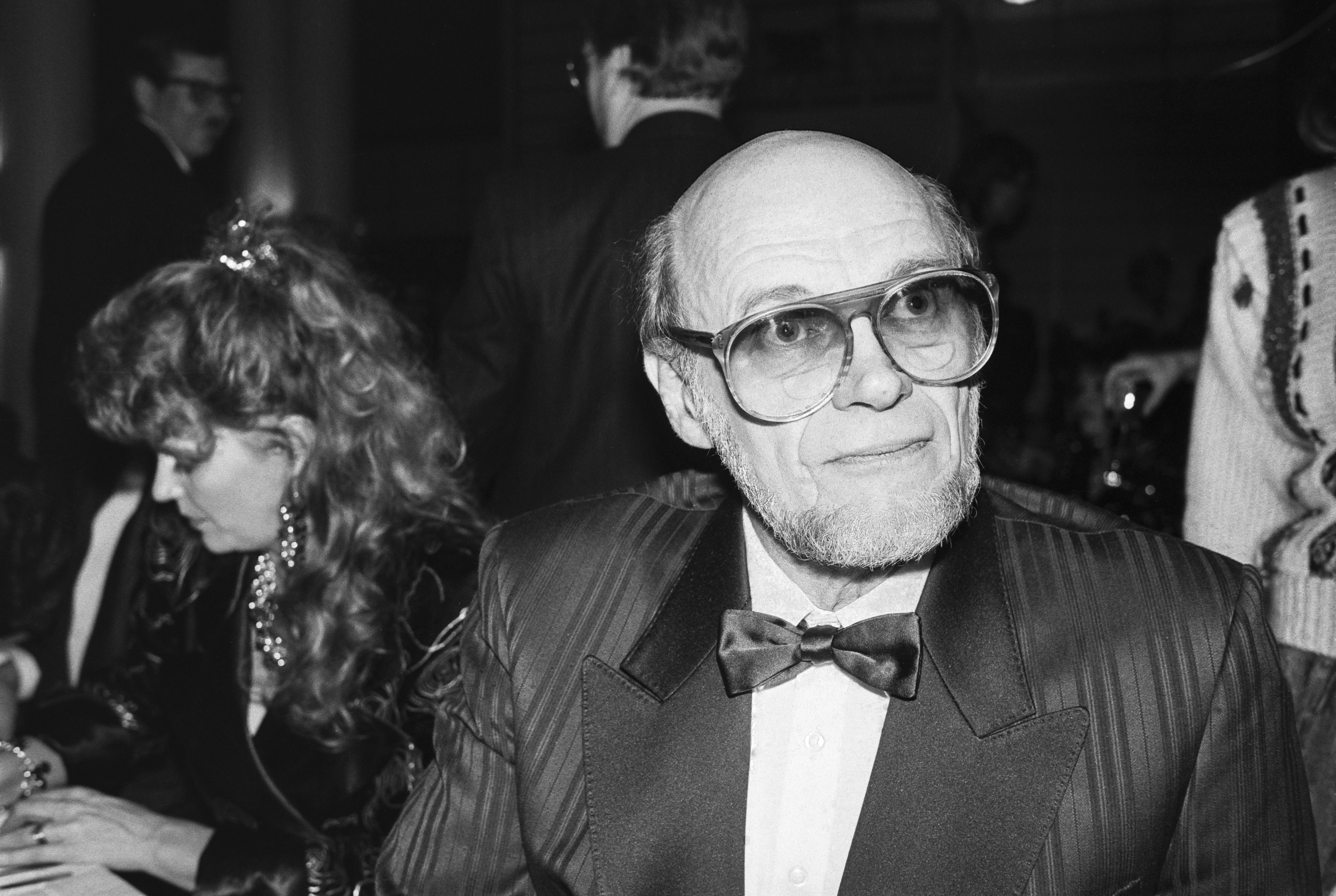
Pasanen at the Venla award ceremony in late January 1990.

The 1990s were a period of recession for Finnish films. In 1989 the Uuno Turhapuro films came close to being discontinued when Pasanen and the film theatre company Finnkino had a dispute about the splitting of income from ticket sales. Regardless of this, Pasanen kept on making a new Turhapuro film every year from 1990 to 1993. This time the Finnish Film Foundation also understood their financial value and granted Pasanen several million markka in support. After Kokkonen had resigned as a director of Turhapuro films Pasanen hired Hannu Seikkula and Pertti Melasniemi in his stead. The creators began to run out of ideas, which was evident from reusing old material. In the 1990s the Turhapuro films were no longer as big successes as earlier but each of them was still the most popular Finnish film at the time of its release.

Pasanen and Kokkonen resolved their disputes and the 1991 film Uuno Turhapuro - herra Helsingin herra and the 1992 film Uuno Turhapuro – Suomen tasavallan herra presidentti were once again made by the old gang. Kokkonen did not want to direct any Turhapuro films any more, so it fell on Pasanen to direct the new films. At this time he had started to lose his grip and make misjudgements. According to Loiri the last three films felt dull and he decided to have a break from the role of Uuno. Pasanen took a huge risk in making the film Uuno Turhapuron veli that did not feature Loiri at all and instead starred Esko Salminen as the lead male actor. The film was a complete flop just like the creators had expected, and so Pasanen decided that there would be no new Turhapuro films without Loiri.

In 1993 Pasanen began producing the drama comedy series Blondi tuli taloon (1994 to 1995) written by Elina Halttunen for MTV3, which was followed by the two hospital series Ihmeidentekijät (1996 to 1998) and Parhaat vuodet (2000 to 2002). In 1995 Pasanen caused a surprise with the Bingolotto game show he had produced for Yle TV1 also incorporating Veikkaus. In spring 1996 Pasanen wrote and produced 23 episodes of the Uuno Turhapuro series which fell short of its expectations. As well as these series Pasanen also produced Kymppitonni and Speden Spelit through the 1990s, which kept Pasanen as the nondisputed viewer rating king of MTV3.

Although Pasanen, Kokkonen and Loiri had made a common decision not to make any new Turhapuro films, this decision had already been overturned in 1998. The film Johtaja Uuno Turhapuro - pisnismies was named the 25th anniversary film of the series. It was produced as a joint operation between Pasanen's and Kokkonen's own production companies. This was the last Turhapuro film to be made during Pasanen's lifetime.

The last Spede film Naisen logiikka was made in 1999. Production had started already in 1991 but was cut off many times. In 1998 Pasanen was forced to finish the film off to avoid having to pay his support grant back to the Finnish Film Foundation. The film was a total failure and was only shown at one theatre in Helsinki for two weeks. Pasanen said at the time that Naisen logiikka will come to the theatre but no one was allowed to go see it.

=== 2000s ===
After the turn of the millennium, Pasanen did not produce any films any more, even though he still had plans for new sketch comedy shows. The threshold to start producing them again was too high after Pasanen had already begun to lose his confidence. On television he continued hosting Speden Spelit every week. Kymppitonni and the new show Parhaat vuodet (2000 to 2002) continuing after Ihmeidentekijät were still being produced. The last episode of Speden Spelit hosted by Pasanen himself was shown on television on 6 September 2001, one day before Pasanen's death.

Before his death Pasanen made a decision to produce the television series Kuumia aaltoja written by Anna-Leena Härkönen, which was made in 2003. Pasanen was also planning a new television series about inventions, but this never went to production.

== Influences and comedy ==
Spede Pasanen named Bob Hope as one of his biggest comedy influences.

Spede Pasanen is considered emblematic of Savonian ironic humor varying between the fullest extremes of understatement and hyperbole. As he himself explained: "A Savonian never tells a thing exactly like it is." Spede's comedy denounced elitism and he explicitly sought to write and perform comedy for the largest possible audience. His early films in particular, featured elements uncommon to Finnish cinema such as fist-fights, car chases, other elaborate stunt-work as well as unconventional special effects. Many of his movies also featured unconventional settings (such as the medieval period or the wild west), though his later films focused almost entirely on poking fun at Finnish stereotypes.

Pasanen's Uuno Turhapuro films feature an unemployed, idle but resourceful protagonist. In Uuno Turhapuro herra Helsingin herra (1991) and Uuno Turhapuro Suomen tasavallan herra presidentti (1992), the character is used to parody political power and changing attitudes towards authority in Finland.

== Other achievements ==
Ski jumping sling, developed by Spede Pasanen in 1976

Pasanen was also an inventor and jack-of-all-trades; he submitted dozens of patent applications, of which ten were registered, and many of his films include Rube Goldberg-style gadgets. Besides gadgets involved with industrial production, his inventions include:

- The Ski jumping sling
- A Boat ski (to alleviate *bumps* in aquaplaning boat)
- A self-extinguishing, one-size-fits-all candlestick.

For a period of time Pasanen was also obsessed with inventing a perpetual motion device. His crude drawings of it also appeared in his sketches shows and films. Once he became convinced that perpetual motion is theoretically impossible, he openly ridiculed himself in the character of Härski Hartikainen in one of the Uuno Turhapuro movies.

== Personal life ==
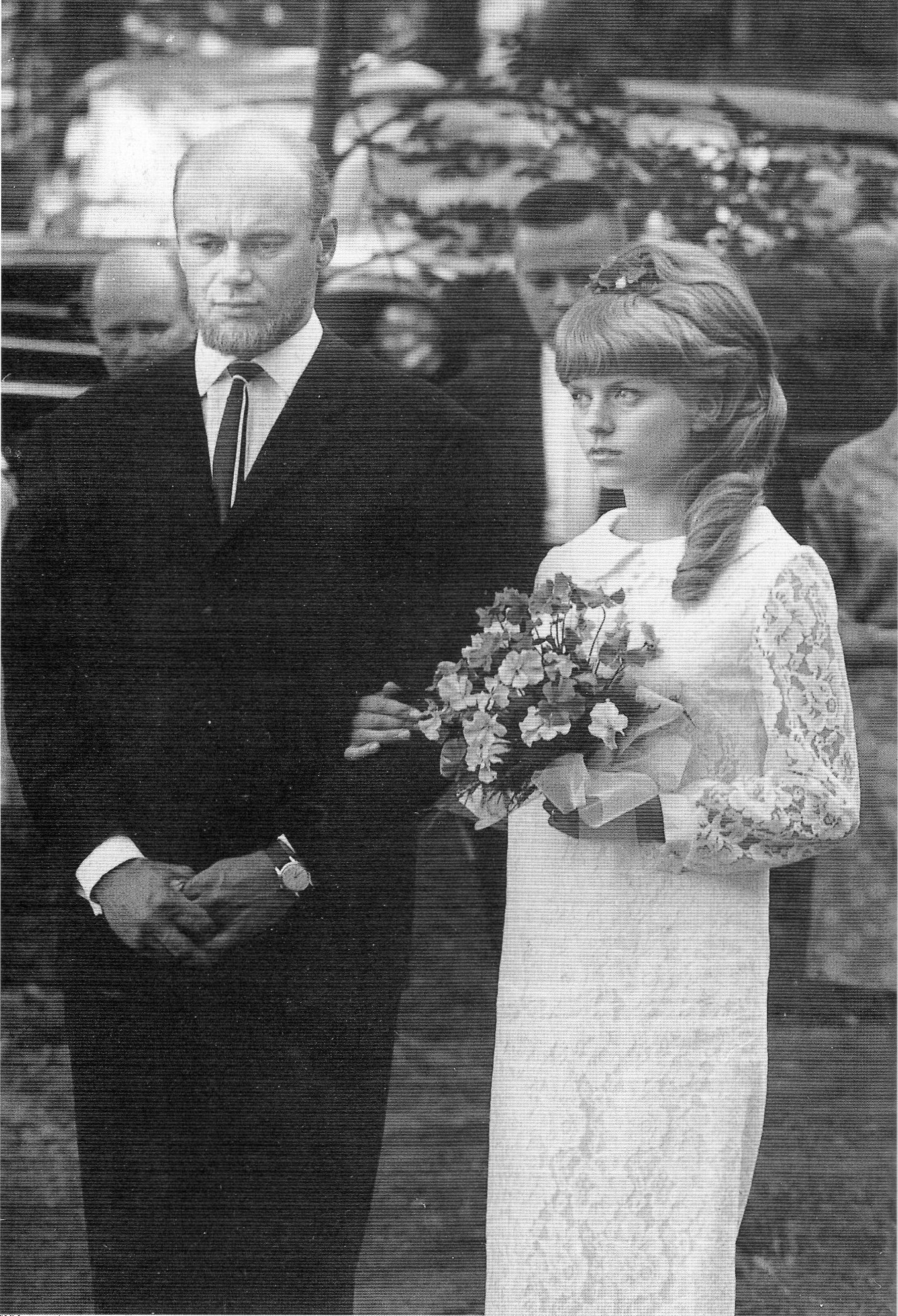
Spede Pasanen and his wife Pirjo Vainimäki on their wedding day on 14 July 1965.

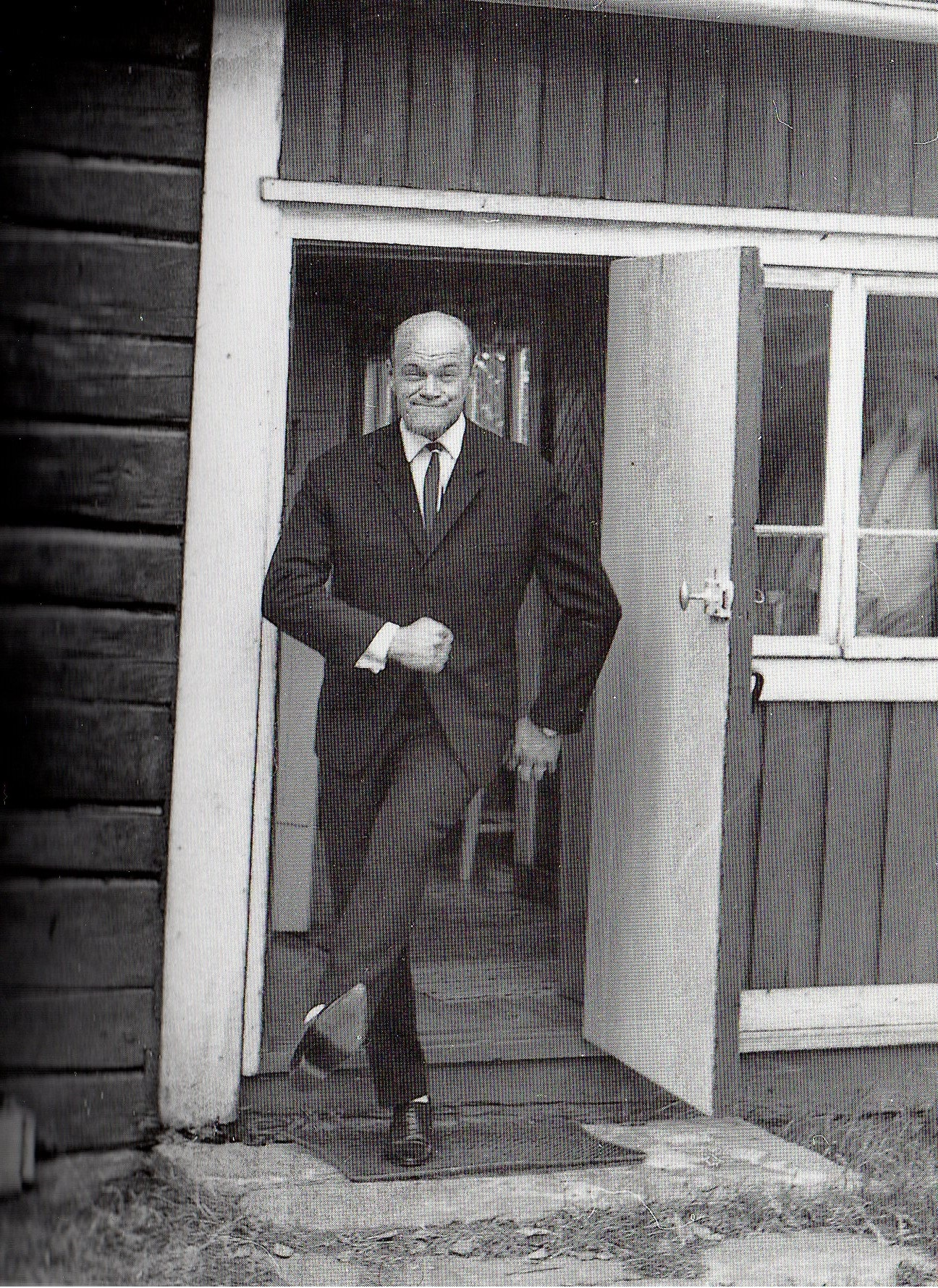
Spede Pasanen in Sorsasalo, Kuopio during his wedding in July 1965.

"Spede saved Simo when Simo was badly cheated in the restaurant business. This was the level of Pasanen's friendship: you save your buddy, even if you lose your own money." - Kari Sohlberg

=== Family and close friends ===
Pasanen was related to singer Kaija Koo (daughter of Pasanen's cousin) and to actor Antti Holma (son of Pasanen's second cousin).

Spede Pasanen lived in the Lauttasaari district of Helsinki from 1956 up to his death in 2001.

When Pasanen was starting the production of his first starring picture X-Paroni, he was looking for a suitable female actress. He visited a party of the advertisement association of Turku in March 1964 and fell in love with Pirjo Vainimäki who was selling lottery tickets there. Vainimäki got a part in Spede's first film of his own and in the next year she became Mrs. Pasanen - they were married on 14 July 1965. On 31 December 1965 the couple's daughter Pirre Päivikki was born. In the late 1970s the couple started drifting apart and Pirjo Pasanen moved to an apartment of her own in Lauttasaari. She told in an interview by Apu magazine in 1981 that their marriage was still ongoing even though she and Pertti lived at different addresses. Pirre Pasanen stayed living with her father. The Pasanens divorced officially after many years.

Pasanen had an eye for feminine beauty and he often dated beauty pageants. In the early 1960s he had brief romances with Anja Mustamäki chosen as Paulig's new "Paula Girl" and with the Yleisradio filming secretary Arja Laine, who later married actor Tommi Rinne.

A private individual, Pasanen did not discuss his personal relationships in public. He had a long relationship with the 1976 Miss Europe, Riitta Väisänen. They met through Jukka Virtanen, who had been on a trip organised by the Zoom sports club together with Väisänen. Pasanen got Väisänen a part in his next film Lentävät luupäät (1984) and planned a television quiz show for her own called Kymppitonni (1985 - 2005 and 2009 - 2011). Pasanen and Väisänen appeared in many "celebrity parties" together for many years. Their relationship was an open secret for many years, until Väisänen admitted to their relationship after Spede's death. The relationship ended in the early 1980s when Väisänen started dating Karl Erik Mäkkylä.

In 1997, Pasanen appointed the 1997 Miss Finland runner-up Maria Drockila as the CEO of his companies. The appointment of Drockila, only 19 years old at the time, to lead an empire of companies with a total revenue of 27 million Finnish markka in 1996, caused a huge controversy. Although Drockila came from an entrepreneur family, she had no commercial training at all. In an interview with Apu magazine in 1997 Pasanen said he had faith in his protegée. He wanted to make Drockila a figurehead for his companies, but in reality he still held control over them himself from the background. The paparazzi followed them, and at the same time gossip magazines reported Pasanen and Drockila were dating. Pasanen had a few arguments with some of the journalists, which they felt were threatening. Already in the 1970 Pasanen disowned the magazine publisher Urpo Lahtinen, and after that Pasanen's name was never mentioned in Hymy magazine any more.

In the early 1960s Pasanen became acquainted with Simo Salminen who had become famous as a clown jumper. Salminen became Pasanen's trusted actor and a comedic partner for his television shows. Salminen and Pasanen remained close friends in private life and were also partly business partners. On the other hand, neither Ere Kokkonen or Vesa-Matti Loiri were part of Pasanen's close friends, and in his last years he hadn't had anything to do with Salminen either. For the most part, the relationship between Pasanen and Loiri had been strictly collegial, but they started becoming close friends shortly before Pasanen's death.

In the 1960s and 1970s Pasanen spent a lot of time at his cabin at the Pallastunturi fell in Muonio, which he had named Mesopotamia. In the 1960s Salminen and Pasanen founded a few restaurants and other places for entertainment, of which the most famous were Simon Rysä in Lappeenranta, Raikulimaa in Lemi and Speden Saluuna in Kouvola. At the time, Pasanen became the victim of fraud, when his business partner Timo T. Kaukonen abused mortgage payments and disappeared into Spain. Pasanen's restaurants went bankrupt one after another, but he only gave up ownership of Speden Saluuna in 1971.

=== Other private life ===
In the 1960s Spede Pasanen got in a car accident, where he was unscathed except a bad-looking scar in his chin. To cover it he grew a beard, which became a permanent trademark for him. In summertime, Pasanen did not want to leave Finland, but since the late 1970s he started spending wintertime in Florida, where he acquired two apartments for his free time. In Florida Pasanen became interested in golf, which he became so enthusiastic about that it replaced many of his other hobbies at the time.

According to Spede Pasanen's close friends, the mirror side of his jolly nature was his aggression towards journalists, who published stories and pictures of Pasanen or his friends without his permission. In these cases, Pasanen got more angry about his friends than about himself. One of the targets of his aggression was Isto Lysmä, the editor of Nyrkkiposti, who published a fake story about a relationship between Pasanen's trusted actor Ville-Veikko Salminen and 1968 Miss Finland Leena Brusiin. Pasanen demanded that Lysmä write a correction, threatening him with the revenge of the group "Musta käsi" (Finnish for "Black Hand") that he had founded. The name is a reference to the secret society of the same name active in Serbia in the 1910s, whose member Gavrilo Princip had shot the archduke Franz Ferdinand of Austria-Hungary in June 1914 and thus indirectly caused the outbreak of World War I. The outcome of the case was that neither Pasanen or any of his close friends were ever mentioned again in Nyrkkiposti. Pasanen made a similar threat to Urpo Lahtinen, at which point the temperamental Lahtinen drew a puukko knife from his pocket and struck its point into the table in front of Pasanen.

Pasanen got into a scandal in autumn 1986 when the police suspected that about two hundred Finns had taken Finnish currency abroad to the United States illegally in order to buy an apartment or to engage in business. When buying free time apartments in Florida in 1979 Pasanen had taken 12 thousand US dollars and 4 thousand Finnish markka to the United States. According to him, he was arrested for eight days because of the case. The case went into court in spring 1987. For most of the accused, including Pasanen, the charges were dropped, because the suspected crime had expired and at the point of time of the investigation, the suspected act was no longer illegal in the first place.

One of Pasanen's hobbies was backgammon which he did well at on an international level. He became the Finnish champion in backgammon in 1979. In 1976 he got elected as the director of the Finnish Backgammon Society. Pasanen also took part in international backgammon tournaments in West Germany, Spain and the United States. Pasanen was also a member of Mensa International. In 1998 Mensa International awarded its annual prize to Pasanen.

Pasanen has been described as having been very different in his private life than the Spede known publicly. He was quick to get angry and calm down, preferred to keep to himself and was social only with people he knew closely. Pasanen felt disgust towards alcoholic beverages and drunken people. In his youth he was a teetotaller, but later started consuming alcohol in moderation. He had a lifetime habit of smoking, which he started in 1958 when he got a role in the ballet Don Quijote.

== Death ==
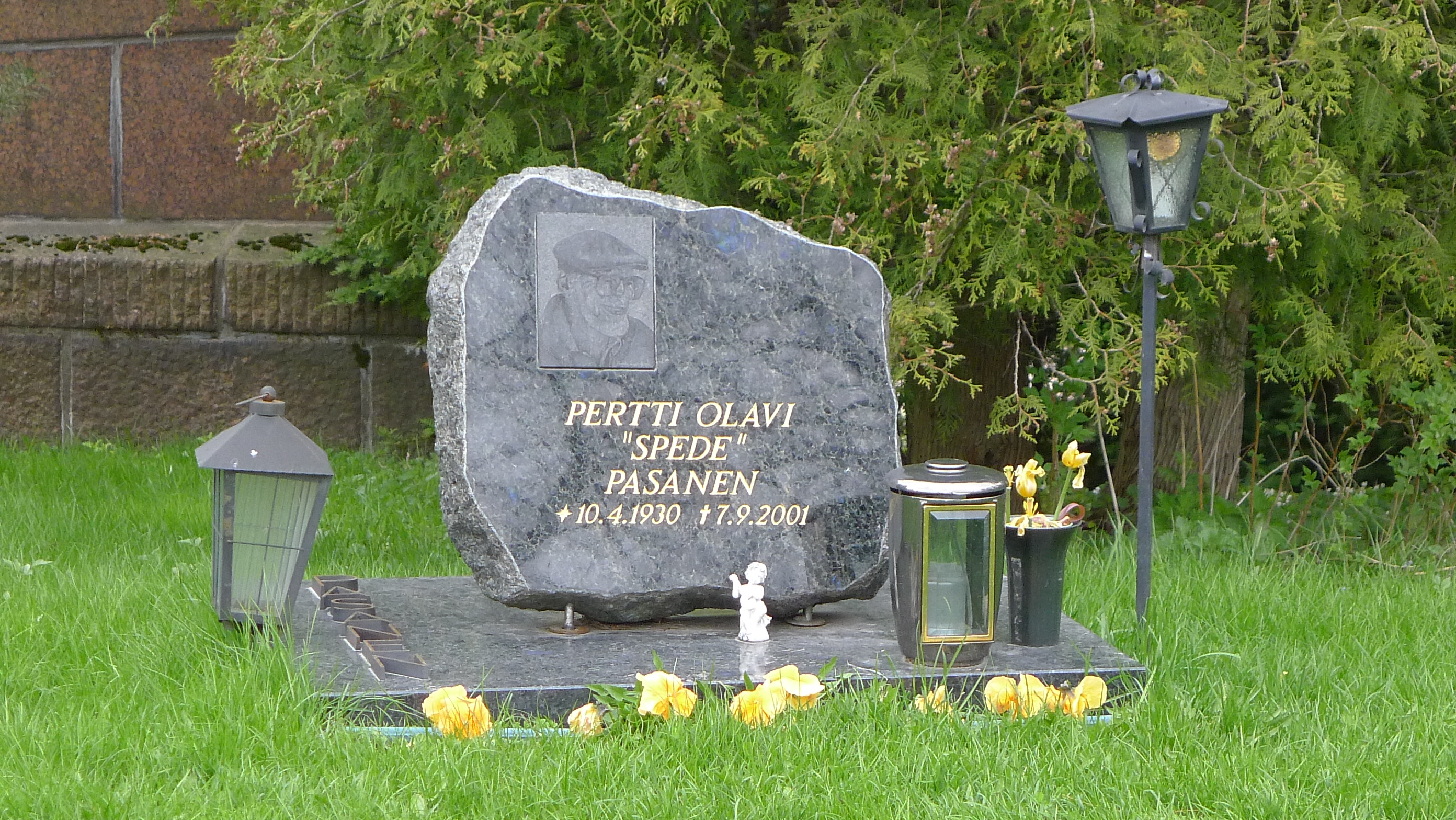
Spede's tombstone in Helsinki, Hietaniemi Cemetery.

Pasanen turned 70 in 2000. His circle of family and friends had already noticed his weakening condition. He had previously been sportsmanlike, but also chainsmoked cigarettes and drank about four litres of full-fat milk every day. Pasanen was aware of his weak condition, so he decided to sell off his entire entertainment empire and only concentrate on the things he felt were most important for himself: golf and new inventions. Despite advice from his friends, Pasanen refused to see a doctor. Pasanen signed the last documents about the sale of his Spede-Yhtiöt companies on the morning of 7 September 2001, mere hours before his death.

On 7 September 2001 Pasanen was playing a round of golf at the Sarfvik golf course in Kirkkonummi, Finland. In the middle of the course, his golf mates noticed he was feeling unwell and was tired. At the 9th hole he began to feel ill and was taken to the outdoor terrace of the café of the club house, where his condition rapidly deteriorated. Pasanen lay down on the couch at the lobby of the club house, where he suffered a cardiac arrest. Despite resuscitation by a doctor who happened to be at the scene and a rapid response of emergency medical services Pasanen died. His death was attributed to advanced coronary artery disease.

Pasanen is buried at the "Artists' Hill" at the Hietaniemi Cemetery in Helsinki.

=== Legacy ===
Spede Pasanen died very wealthy, and his daughter Pirre Alanen inherited almost the entirety of her father's wealth of about 10 million euro. Pasanen left 170 thousand euro to his ex-wife Pirjo. From 1998 to 1999, Pasanen had lent Maria Drockila a total sum of 1.85 million markka for a period of 30 years without interest. According to Pasanen's will on 26 July 2000 Drockila's debts were forgiven so that they are annulled and finally expired and the inheritance tax resulting from the annullation is paid from the funds of the estate. Alanen and Drockila had an argument about paying the inheritance tax and about the sum of 220 thousand markka that Pasanen lent Drockila after making his will. They resolved their arguments before the matter went to court.

=== After death ===
After Pasanen's death almost all of films have been published on DVD (and in the beginning also on VHS). The television channel MTV3 has shown Pasanen's films on television. From 2005 to 2008 almost all surviving episodes of the sketch comedy Spede Show were published on DVD. The last episode of 1987 was not published. In 2002, EMI published all surviving radio sketches of Papukaija G. Pula-aho played by Pasanen and Leo Jokela on CD (the title of the CD was Pure nenääs! ("Bite your nose")), which remained at the Finnish official list for a total of 20 weeks, of which five weeks at the top spot. The last Uuno Turhapuro film, Uuno Turhapuro – This Is My Life, was made in 2004 in memory of Pasanen.

After Pasanen's death, Saija Hakola replaced him as the host of Speden Spelit, having acted as his back-up already in a few earlier episodes. A twist of fate was that the first episode of Speden Spelit after Pasanen's death was shot on 11 September 2001, when the producers had the time to see one of the twin towers of the World Trade Center in New York City collapse on live television. The show Speden Spelit was originally planned to end at the end of 2001, but after Saija Hakola was well received by the audience, it was continued by one year. The last episode was broadcast on 27 December 2002. The show Kymppitonni hosted by Riitta Väisänen, which still had over 400 thousand viewers per week, stayed on the screen longer, up to autumn 2005. In 2009, the short-lived channel SuomiTV took it into its programming for a few years, after which Spede Pasanen's name disappeared from the credits of Finnish television programmes forever. There were remakes of the programme since 2012.

A concert was held in memory of Pasanen on 1 November 2001. Performers appearing at the concert included Vesa-Matti Loiri, Jari Sillanpää, Linda Lampenius, Danny, Samuli Edelmann and Paula Koivuniemi. The city of Kuopio founded an inventors' competition named after Pasanen after his death. This competition was held up to 2012.

A play about Pasanen's life, concentrating on his youth, was made at the Kuopio summer theatre in 2018. The play was directed by Ismo Apeli.

In Pasanen's honour, a beer named Härski & Sörsselson after Pasanen and Simo Salminen was made in 2017. The beer can shows the pictures of Pasanen's and Salminen's characters and the beer was brewed by the Saku Brewery in Estonia.

Pasanen appeared as one of the characters in the board game Steampunk Rally Fusion by the Canadian game publisher Roxley Games Laboratory in spring 2020.

A biographical film was made about Pasanen's life, called Spede directed by Aleksi Delikouras, based on Tuomas Marjamäki's 2017 book Spede, nimittäin and the 2021 book Uuno on numero yksi - Turhapuron koko tarina. The film stars Riku Nieminen as Spede Pasanen and it was premiered in autumn 2023.

=== 2022 revelations ===
In 2022, famous Finnish businesswoman and former TV host Lenita Airisto accused Pasanen of having attempted to rape her in the early 1990s. Hannele Lauri and Riitta Väisänen, who had been working closely with Pasanen for years, said they were completely surprised with Airisto's statement.

Reporter Katariina Souri reported of similar behaviour in a Facebook post. The model Marita Hakala commented on the news: "I would have sufficed on my own, and I was not offered a job via the bed - except in Finland. With that, I was referring to Spede."

Former MTV manager and director Jorma Sairanen also confirmed that Airisto's and Souri's allegations were not a surprise to him due to Pasanen's importance and status at the network. Sairanen had told about the matter himself in his 2017 memoirs.

== Notable collaborators ==
- Ere Kokkonen
- Jukka Virtanen
- Simo Salminen
- Vesa-Matti Loiri
- Leo Jokela
- Riitta Väisänen
- Pentti Siimes
- Olavi Ahonen
- Juhani Kumpulainen
- Hannele Lauri
- Marita Nordberg

== Criticism ==
Since the 1960s, critics were particularly harsh towards Pasanen's films. The criticism was mainly targeted towards the shallow nature of the scripts. The critics thought the films mostly seemed like sketch comedies without a supporting plot. According to Veijo Hietala, the critics missed the fact that Pasanen was carrying on the tradition of farce that had started already in the period of silent films, where the plot is only secondary and mostly serves to create a background for slapstick humour and individual comedic scenes.

In the 1970s, the critics were clearly against Pasanen's entertainment. The Uuno Turhapuro films were seen as spreading wrong attitudes and as tasteless standard products preventing the use of thought and recognition. These criticisms were not only directed towards the content of the films, but also towards the use of cinema, which the critics thought was as shabby as Uuno himself. The criticism grew even harsher as the films themselves grew more popular.

According to Ere Kokkonen, Pasanen's movies were not always reviewed fairly. Sometimes the films even received negative criticism before they had been shown in the first place. Sakari Toiviainen once wrote that he had not seen the new Spede Pasanen film yet, but it must be a bad one.

Pasanen usually ignored criticism towards him, but in a way he got back to his criticisers. In 1981 he put an announcement in Helsingin Sanomat promising a reward for killing critic Mikael Fränti who had given a negative review of Uuno Turhapuron aviokriisi.

== Filmography ==
=== Writer, director or producer ===
- X-Paroni (directed with Jaakko Pakkasvirta, 1964) ("The X-baron")
- Millipilleri (1966) ("The milli-pill")
- Pähkähullu Suomi (1967) ("The nutty Finland")
- Noin seitsemän veljestä (1968) ("About seven Brothers")
- Näköradiomiehen ihmeelliset siekailut (1969) ("The wonderful hesitations of the television man")
- Leikkikalugangsteri (1969) ("The Toy Gangster")
- Pohjan tähteet (1969) ("The remains of the north")
- Jussi Pussi (1970) ("Baggy John")
- Speedy Gonzales – noin 7 veljeksen poika (1970) ("Speedy Gonzales - the son of about seven brothers")
- Saatanan radikaalit (1971) (Producer only) ("Bloody radicals")
- Kahdeksas veljes (1971) ("The Eighth Brother")
- Hirttämättömät (1971) ("The unhanged")
- Uuno Turhapuro (1973) ("Uuno Turhapuro")
- Viu-hah hah-taja (1974) ("The streaker")
- Professori Uuno D.G. Turhapuro (1975) ("Professor Uuno D.G. Turhapuro")
- Lottovoittaja UKK Turhapuro (1976) ("UKK Turhapuro, the lottery winner")
- Häpy Endkö? Eli kuinka Uuno Turhapuro sai niin kauniin ja rikkaan vaimon (1977) ("A happy end? Or how Uuno Turhapuro got a wife so beautiful and rich")
- Rautakauppias Uuno Turhapuro, presidentin vävy (1978) ("Hardware store owner Uuno Turhapuro, the son-in-law of the president")
- Koeputkiaikuinen ja Simon enkelit (1979) ("The test-tube adult and Simo's Angels")
- Tup-akka-lakko (1980) ("Quitting smoking")
- Uuno Turhapuron aviokriisi (1981) ("Uuno Turhapuro's marriage crisis")
- Pölhölä (1981) ("Dumbsville")
- Uuno Turhapuro menettää muistinsa (1982) ("Uuno Turhapuro loses his memory")
- Uuno Turhapuron muisti palailee pätkittäin (1983) ("Uuno Turhapuro's memory comes back piece by piece")
- Lentävät luupäät (1984) ("The Flying Boneheads")
- Uuno Turhapuro armeijan leivissä (1984) ("Uuno Turhapuro goes to the army")
- Uuno Epsanjassa (1985) (Uuno in Spain")
- Kliffaa hei! (1985) ("Hey, that's fun!")
- Uuno Turhapuro muuttaa maalle (1986) ("Uuno Turhapuro moves to the countryside")
- Liian iso keikka (1986) ("A Gig Too Big")
- Pikkupojat (1986) ("The little boys")
- Uuno Turhapuro – kaksoisagentti (1987) ("Uuno Turhapuro - the double agent")
- Fakta homma! (1987) ("That's a fact!")
- Tupla-Uuno (1988) ("Double Uuno")
- Onks' Viljoo näkyny? (1988) ("Have Ya Seen Viljo?")
- Rampe & Naukkis (1990) ("Rampe & Naukkis")
- Uunon huikeat poikamiesvuodet maaseudulla (1990) ("Uuno's wonderful bachelor years at the countryside")
- Uuno Turhapuro, herra Helsingin herra (1991) ("Uuno Turhapuro, the big shot in Helsinki")
- Uuno Turhapuro, Suomen tasavallan herra presidentti (1992) ("Uuno Turhapuro, the President of the Republic of Finland")
- Uuno Turhapuron poika (1993) ("The Son of Uuno Turhapuro")
- Romanovin kivet (1993) ("The Romanov stones")
- Pekko ja Poika (1994) ("Pekko and son")
- Uuno Turhapuron veli (1994) ("The brother of Uuno Turhapuro")
- Johtaja Uuno Turhapuro – pisnismies (1998) ("Director Uuno Turhapuro - the businessman")
- Naisen logiikka (1999) ("The Logic of the Women")

=== Actor ===
- Laivan kannella (1954) ("On the deck of a ship")
- Sankarialokas (1955) ("The recruit hero")
- Säkkijärven polkka (1955) ("The polka from Säkkijärvi")
- Villi Pohjola (1955) ("The Wild North")
- Tyttö tuli taloon (1956) ("The girl came into the house")
- Tyttö lähtee kasarmiin (1956) ("The girl goes to the army")
- Rintamalotta (1956) ("The Lotta at the frontline")
- Anu ja Mikko (1956) ("Anu and Mikko")
- Pekka ja Pätkä ketjukolarissa (1957) ("Pekka and Pätkä at a pile-up")
- Vääpelin kauhu (1957) ("The sergeant major's horror")
- Pekka ja Pätkä sammakkomiehinä (1957) ("Pekka and Pätkä as scuba divers")
- Asessorin naishuolet (1957) ("The lady troubles of the accessor")
- Pekka ja Pätkä Suezilla (1958) ("Pekka and Pätkä at the Suez")
- Ei ruumiita makuuhuoneeseen (1959) ("No bodies into the bedroom")
- Mullin mallin (1961) ("Jumbled up")
- Taape tähtenä (1962) ("Taape as a star")
- Hopeaa rajan takaa (1963) ("Silver from beyond the border")
- Pohjan tähteet (1969) ("The remains of the north")
- Tup-akka-lakko (1980) ("Quitting smoking")
- Koeputkiaikuinen ja Simon enkelit (1981) ("The test-tube adult and Simo's Angels")
- Hei kliffaa hei! (1985) ("Hey, that's fun!")
- Pikkupojat (1986) ("The little boys")
- Naisen logiikka (1999) ("The logic of women")

In the Uuno Turhapuro series, Pasanen played the role of Härski-Hartikainen, a car repairman with a cunning and ribald character, who often participated in Uuno's farcical adventures. His sidekick was Sörsselssön – earlier known as Lörssön (played by Simo Salminen).

=== Television series ===
Spede is considered the father of modern Finnish television sketch-humour. Starting his career on Yleisradio he later jumped camps to the competing MTV3 network. However, his work on both has been extremely popular. Apart from starring in these series he was also the main producer for many of the popular shows on MTV3, such as the game-show Kymppitonni and the cult-hit show Pulttibois.

==== Yle ====
- Spede Show (1964, 1971–1976, 1982 ja 1984-1987)
- Speden saluuna (1965)
- Spedevisio (1965–1967)
- 50 pientä minuuttia (1967–1971)
- Robin Hood ja hänen iloiset vekkulinsa Sherwoodin pusikoissa (1974)

==== MTV3 ====
- Kymppitonni (1985–2005)
- Uuno Turhapuro armeijan leivissä (1986) (the film as a TV series)
- Vesku Show (1988–1991)
- Spede Special (1988–1990)
- Pulttibois (1989–1991)
- Spedestroikka (1990)
- Junnutonni (1991)
- Speden sallitut leikit (1990–1992)
- Speden tee-se-itse TV (1991–1992)
- Hynttyyt yhteen (1991–1995)
- Speden spelit (1992–2002)
- Tsa Tsa Tsaa (1993–1994)
- Blondi tuli taloon (1994–1995), in English The Blonde That Came to the House
- Uuno Turhapuro (TV series) (1996)
- Ihmeidentekijät (1996–1998)
- Parhaat vuodet (2000–2002)
- Kuumia aaltoja (2003)

== Legacy ==
=== In popular culture ===
In 2023, a biopic feature-length film, Spede, directed by Aleksi Delikouras and starring Riku Nieminen in the title role, was released.

=== Named after Spede Pasanen ===
- SPEDE (Spacecraft Potential, Electron and Dust Experiment), an instrument attached to the SMART-1 lunar probe.
