= Tamara Lund =

Finnish opera singer (1941–2005)

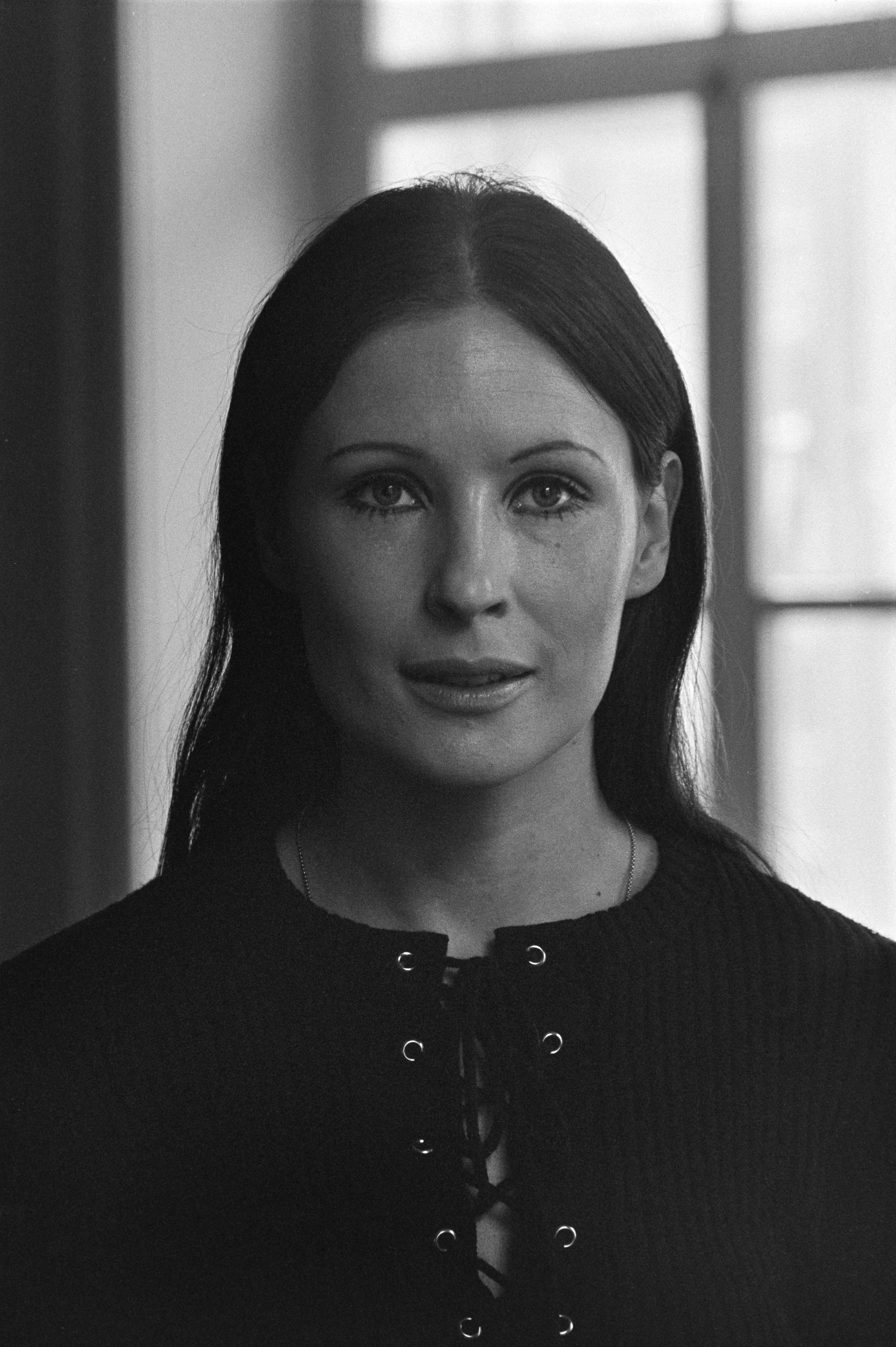
- Lund in 1970
- Born: Tamara Adele Lund; 6 January 1941; Turku, Finland
- Died: 21 July 2005 (aged 64); Turku, Finland
- Occupation(s): Singer, actress
- Years active: 1959–2005
- Spouses: Aatos Tapala (1966–1985); Alexandru Ioniță (1985–2005)
- Children: Maria Lund

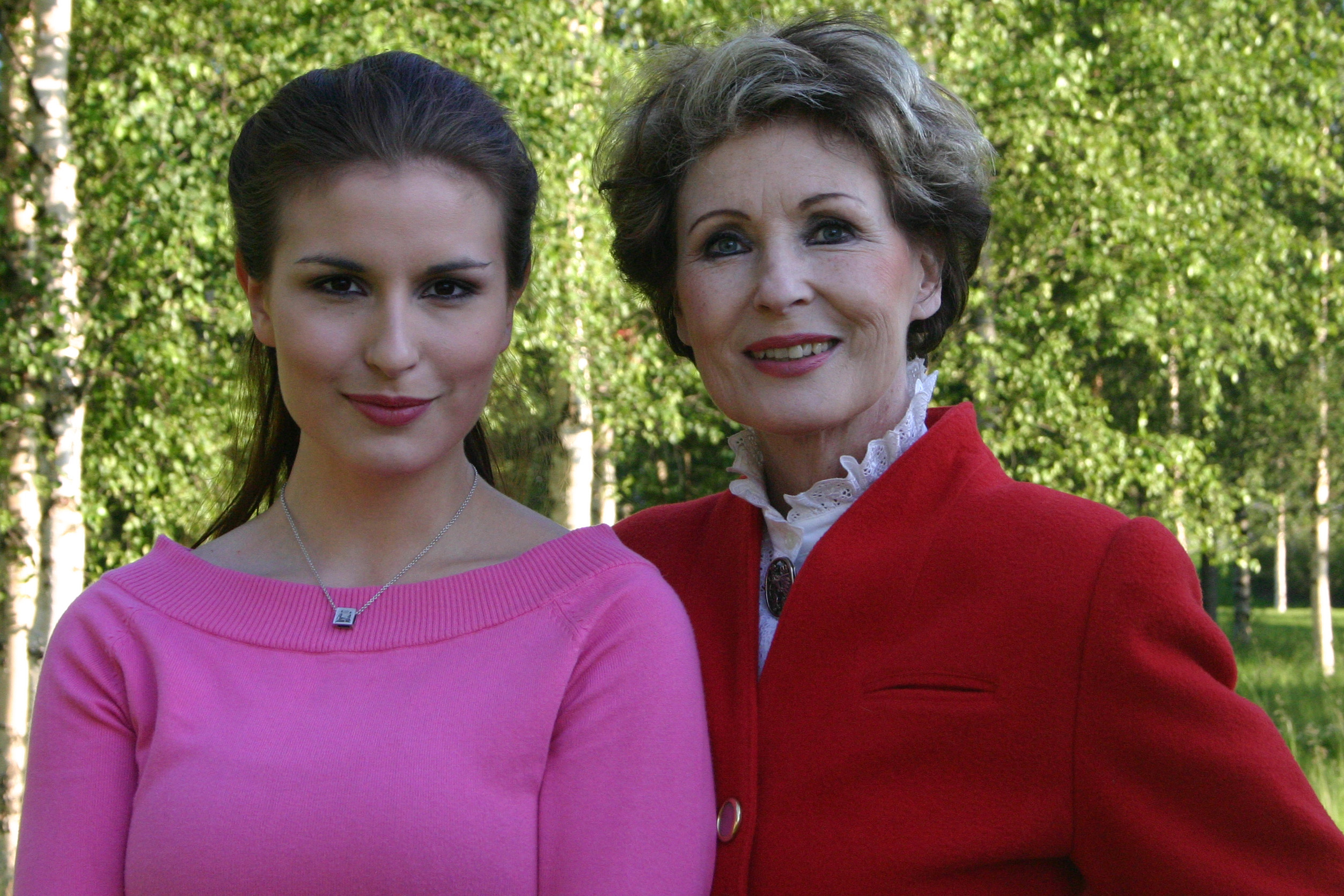
Maria and Tamara Lund in 2004

Tamara Adele Lund-Ioniță (née Lund; 6 January 1941 – 21 July 2005) was a Finnish soprano singer and actress. She was born in Turku and was a graduate of the Sibelius Academy. She performed in the Finnish National Opera from 1967 and at the Staatstheater am Gärtnerplatz in Munich from 1974 to 1987. Lund was the mother of the Finnish singer Maria Lund. Her second spouse was the Romanian opera singer Alexandru Ioniță. Lund died of stomach cancer in Turku in July 2005.

== Discography ==
- Tamara Lund (1965)
- Marco Bakker in Wenen (1975)
- Mä elän (1977)
- Sinun omasi (1983)
- Rakkauden siivin (1990)
- Tamara ja Alexandru slaavilaistunnelmissa (1990, with Alexandru Ioniță)
- Pustan säveliä (1992)

== Filmography ==
- Kun tuomi kukkii (1962)
- Villin Pohjolan kulta (1963)
- Leikkikalugangsteri (1969)
- The Marvellous Adventures of a TV Man (1969)
- Headquarters (1970)
