= Aatos Tapala =

Finnish opera singer

Aatos Abel Tapala (born 5 May 1940) is a Finnish actor and opera singer.

Tapala was born in Sauvo, and, for a time, a soloist for the Finnish National Opera from 1965 to 1972.

== Roles ==
- Tamino in The Magic Flute
- Basilio in The Marriage of Figaro
- The Steerman in The Flying Dutchman
- Aegisthus in Elektra
- the Artist in Lulu
- Šemeikka in Juha
- Tony in West Side Story.

== Biography ==
Aatos Abel Tapala was born in Sauvo, Finland in the year of 1940.

Tapala spend a significant amount of time studying other artists such as Jorma Huttusen, Pekka Nuotion, Clemens Glettenbergin, Clemens Kaiser-Bremen and Gino Cittadini-Lauri. Tapala also spent time as an elementary schoolteacher.

Tapala was married to Tamara Lund from the year of 1966 until 1985 when they divorced. The couple had one child together.

== Filmography ==
- Rinnakkain (1968)
- The Headquarters (1970)
- Lumberjacking (1988)
- Risto Räppääjä ja liukas Lennart (2014)
