= Blondi tuli taloon =

Finnish television series

- Created by: Spede Pasanen; Elina Halttunen
- Starring: Anu Hälvä; Esko Salminen; Niko Sinervä; Lotta Onttonen; Saara Ylitalo; Eeva Eloranta; Matti Ranin
- Country of origin: Finland
- No. of episodes: 151

Original release
- Network: MTV3
- Release: 1994 – 1995

Blondi tuli taloon (The Blonde Came to the House) is a Finnish television series. It first aired on Finnish TV in 1994 and last aired in 1995.

== See also ==
- List of Finnish television series
