= X-Paroni =

- Directed by: Uncredited also writers : Risto Jarva; Jaakko Pakkasvirta; Spede Pasanen
- Starring: Spede Pasanen; Jaakko Pakkasvirta; Meri Lii
- Music by: Henrik Otto Donner
- Distributed by: Väinän Filmi (Finland) (theatrical); Finnkino (2003) (Finland) (DVD); Finnkino (2003) (Finland) (VHS); Mainostelevisio (MTV3) (Finland) (TV)
- Release date: 1964
- Running time: 85 minutes
- Country: Finland
- Language: Finnish

X-Paroni (X-Baron) is a 1964 Finnish comedy and the debut of Spede Pasanen as a leading male role and debut as a co-writer and director of a full-length film.

== Plot summary ==
The plot concerns a wealthy but naive baron von Tandem (Pasanen), who is so interested in foreign cultures (particularly Native American), that he is oblivious that people within his own organization are funneling money to a local mafia. While visiting the countryside the baron is mistaken for a lazy but clever and inventive farmer Kalle (also Pasanen), who looks exactly like him, and the two switch places by accident. While the reserved baron manages to charm the simple people of the country village, his lookalike cracks down on the corruption within the baron's business monopoly (often spoken of but never elaborated). This eventually leads the mob attempting to assassinate the baron (actually Kalle), who then flees back to the countryside after learning of his doppelgänger. In the end the baron and Kalle meet and trade places for good, the baron choosing the simple country life and Kalle taking over the baron's business empire.

== Production ==
The film marked Spede's one and only time as a collaborative film-maker with Jaakko Pakkasvirta (who plays James in the film) and Risto Jarva. Although all three share writing-credit, Pasanen was mainly responsible for planning the comedy of the film. Of Spede's future collaborators, the film features a first appearance by Simo Salminen in a minor role, before he would appear more prominently in Millipilleri and several other future films.

The film introduced several conventions of Spede's later work such as gangsters, gadgetry, a luxuriously rich main protagonist and an intentionally fast-paced crazy comedy delivery. Similarly to his later films Noin 7 Veljestä, Speedy Gonzales - Noin Seitsemän Veljeksen Poika, Koeputkiaikuinen ja Simon enkelit and Tup-Akka-Lakko, Pasanen plays a dual-role.
