= Speden Spelit =

Finnish game show

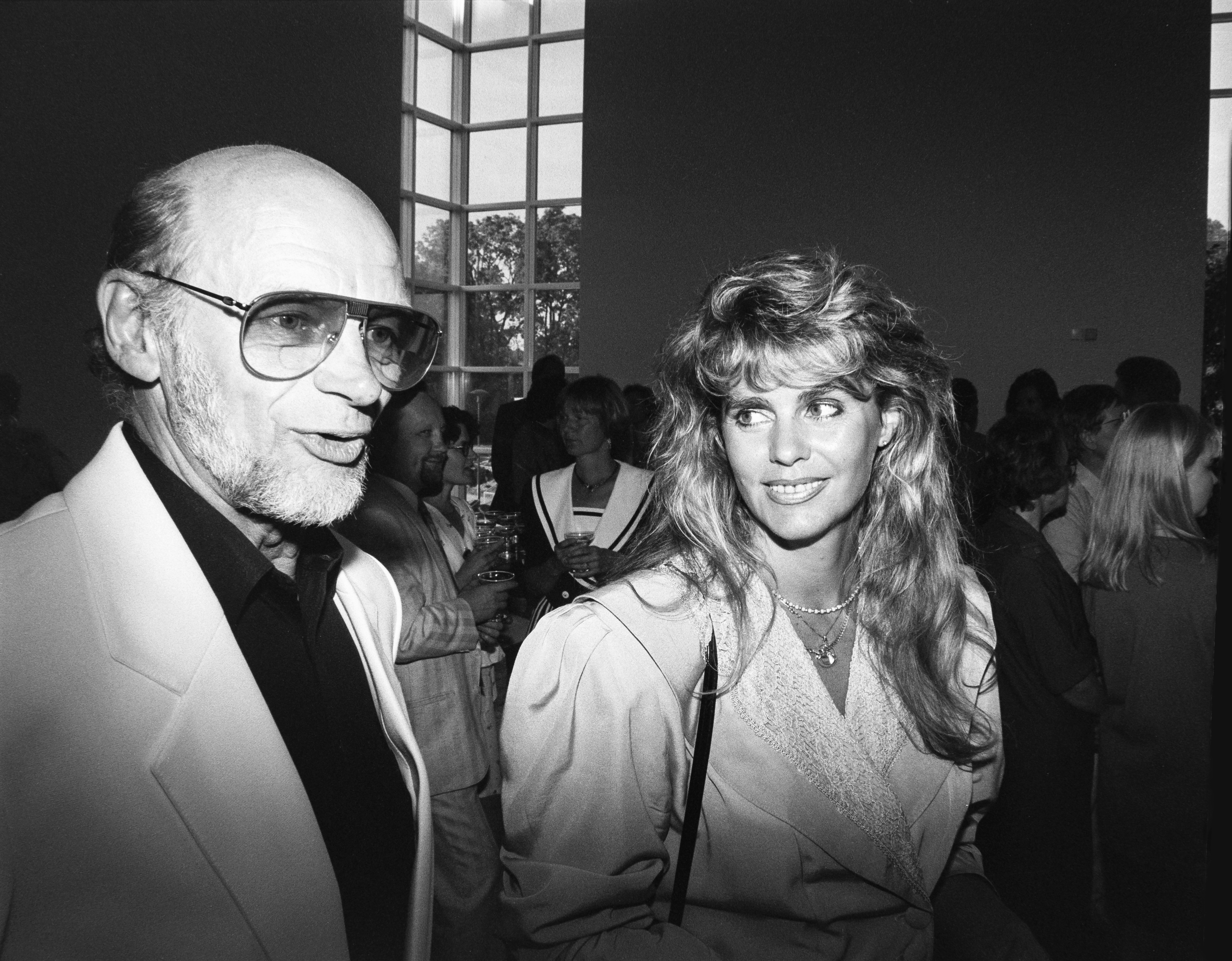
Spede Pasanen was the host of the series

Speden Spelit (formerly Spede Special, Spedestroika and Speden sallitut leikit) is a television game show presented by Spede Pasanen. It aired first on the Finnish channel Kolmoskanava in 1988 and from 1993 to 2002 on MTV3.

== History ==
The name of the show changed three times during its existence. In the beginning (from 1988 to 1989) the name was Spede Special, from 1989 to 1990 Spedestroika (from perestroika which happened during that time), and from 1990 to 1992 Speden sallitut leikit ("Spede's allowed games", a reference to the phrase "forbidden games"). The name Speden Spelit ("Spede's Sgames") came in use in November 1992 when the gambling of national betting agency Veikkaus was attached to it. The new name initially caused problems, because a folk music festival in Southern Ostrobothnia was already using the name "Spelit", and the festival organisers demanded that Pasanen would change the name of his show, but the name Speden Spelit remained in use.

The show was almost entirely presented by Pertti "Spede" Pasanen. In the early 1990s, Arja Koriseva and Simo Salminen presented few episodes. After Pasanen's death in September 2001, the show was presented by Saija Hakola till the end was put to the show next year. The show was closed down in 2002, shortly after the death of Pasanen.

== Airing times ==
The Spede Special was aired Wednesdays on 18:30–19:30. The Spedestroika and also Speden sallitut leikit were aired on 18:00–19:00. In September 1992, Speden sallitut leikit was moved to air Thursdays on 20:00–21:00. From 1992 to 1998, Speden Spelit was also aired Thursdays on 20:00–21:00. From 1999 to 2001, it was aired twice a week Wednesdays and Fridays. After the death of Pasanen, the airing time was moved to Friday 18:00–19:00.

== Format ==
In Speden Spelit, four celebrity contestant were participating in different games, contesting against each other. After each game, the winning celebrity played against Pasanen for a money bet (2,000, 3,000 or 4,000 marks). Despite his age, Pasanen was in good physical condition and usually won against the contestant even in the games that required physical activity. For example, world-class association football player Sami Hyypiä was defeated by Pasanen in skipping rope. Pasanen was a competitive character and it was not unusual him to lose his cool after a defeat.

=== Games ===
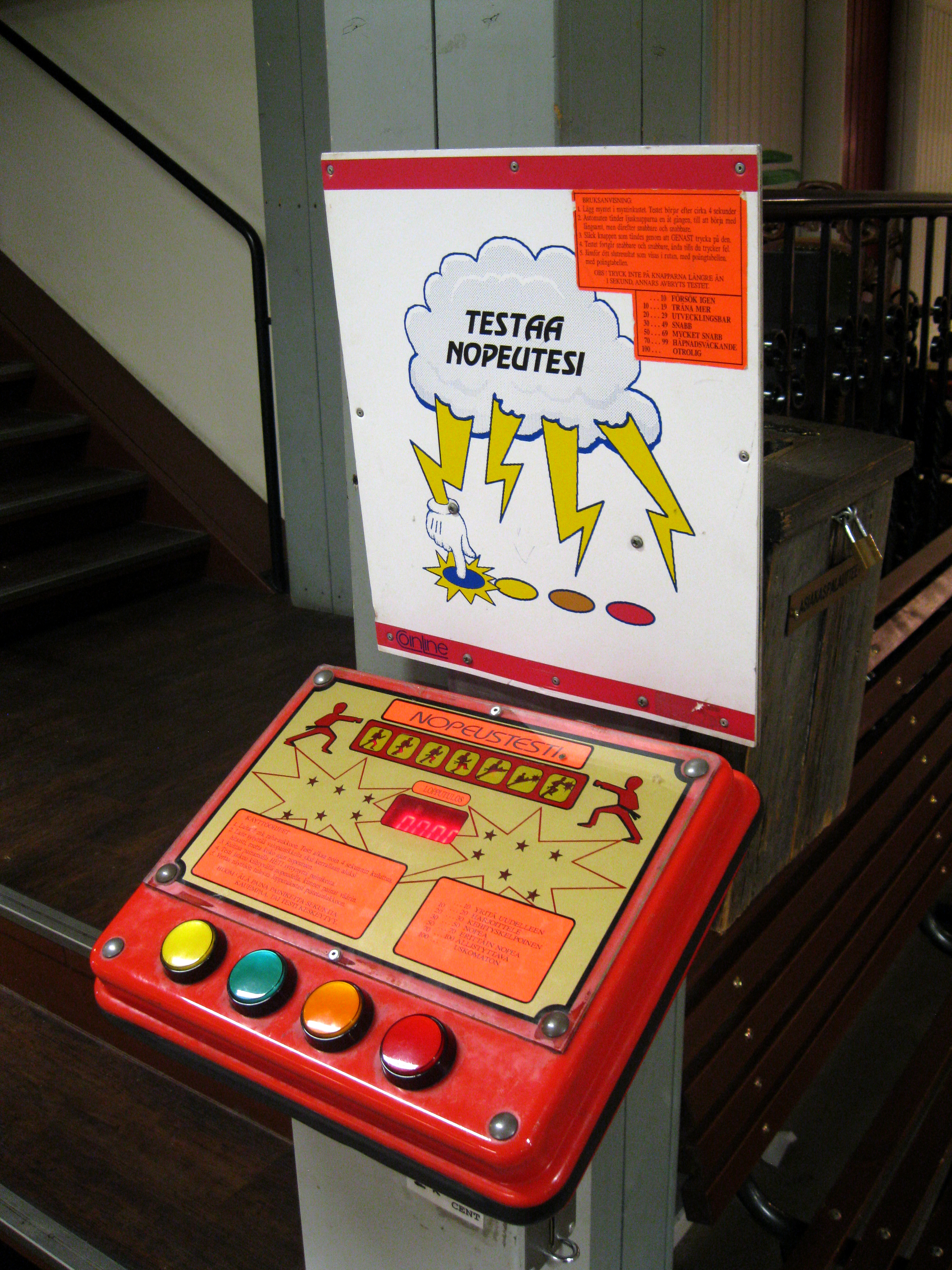
"Speed tester machine"

Typical games of the show were e.g.

- skipping rope (single and pairs)
- knocking down pins by kicking a ball
- standing on one foot eyes closed
- shooting with Laser pistol
- billiards on the floor of the studio
- twirling a hula hoop around the neck
- estimating time with a stopwatch
- predicting the colour of a playing card (black or red)
- Word game with missing letters
- Air balance with blow dryer and Table tennis ball

Athletic World game also became known from Spede Pasanen's Speden Spelit television program, where the game was played.

Pasanen, a renowned inventor, also developed different types of machines used in the games, like a car track game used by treddling foot. One of the most popular games was a speed tester machine with four different coloured buttons and the players had to push them in the order the machine by increase in speed lights the lamps in the button. The machine became so popular that many shops, bars and gas stations put them next to their slot machines.

== Betting game ==
In 1992, Speden Spelit was attached with the gambling of national betting agency Veikkaus. The aim was to guess the number of the player winning each game. The numbers were drawn between the games. Each week also two ordinary citizens who got three TV symbols from a scraping lottery ticket Casino and sent that ticket to the show, were drawn to compete at a certain type of card game at the end section of each show.
