= Spede (film) =

- Original Finnish film poster
- Directed by: Aleksi Delikouras
- Written by: Antti Heikkinen; Aleksi Delikouras
- Based on: Tuomas Marjamäki's books Spede, nimittäin and Uuno on numero yksi
- Produced by: Olli Haikka; Marko Talli
- Starring: Riku Nieminen; Aku Sipola; Mikko Töyssy; Joonas Nordman; Minka Kuustonen; Linnea Leino
- Cinematography: Joonas Pulkkanen
- Edited by: Dimmu Okulov
- Production company: Yellow Film & TV
- Distributed by: Nordisk Film
- Release date: 29 September 2023
- Running time: 95 minutes
- Country: Finland
- Language: Finnish
- Budget: 2 million euro

Spede is a 2023 Finnish biographical film directed by Aleksi Delikouras. The film is about the lives of Pertti "Spede" Pasanen, Vesa-Matti Loiri, Simo Salminen and Ere Kokkonen in the late 1960s and early 1970s, when the Uuno Turhapuro character had just been invented.

== Development ==
The script for the film was written by Delikouras together with Antti Heikkinen. The script was based on Tuomas Marjamäki's biographical books Spede, nimittäin (2017) and Uuno on numero yksi - Turhapuron koko tarina (2021).

The film was produced by Olli Haikka and Marko Talli for the company Yellow Film & TV. The film is broadcast by Nordisk Film. MTV3 and C More have acquired the streaming rights for the film. The budget for the film was 2 million euro. The Finnish Film Foundation has supported the film with 600 thousand euro. The film was shot on 35 mm and 8 mm film.

== Release ==
Spede premiered on 29 September 2023.

== Cast ==
Actor	Character
Riku Nieminen	Pertti "Spede" Pasanen
Aku Sipola	Vesa-Matti Loiri
Mikko Töyssy	Simo Salminen
Joonas Nordman	Ere Kokkonen
Minka Kuustonen	Pirjo Pasanen
Helmi-Leena Nummela	Marjatta Raita
Lauri Tilkanen	Jukka Virtanen
Sami Kojonen	Olavi Ahonen

== Reception ==
Pekka Torvinen cites the film's problems as the weakness and blandness of the narrative. Individual scenes amount to less than their sum. Torvinen's later review praises Aku Sipola for his portrayal of Vesa-Matti Loiri: his performance is phenomenal. There is very little credibility to the other characters. According to Torvinen the cause might be that "the original gentlemen often seemed like caricatures of themselves". Torvinen gave the film a rating of two stars out of five in both of his reviews.

- Toni Keränen, Katso: 4/5
- Jussi Virratvuori, Savon Sanomat: 3/5
- Jussi Huhtala, Episodi: 3/5
- Tuomas Rantanen, Voima: 3/5
- Jukka Sammalisto, Demokraatti: 2/5
- Lauri Lehtinen, Suomen Kuvalehti: 2/5
- Pekka Torvinen, Helsingin Sanomat: 2/5
- Antti Selkokari, Kulttuuritoimitus: 1.5/5
- Saku Schildt, Soundi: 3/5
