= Riku Nieminen =

Finnish actor and dancer

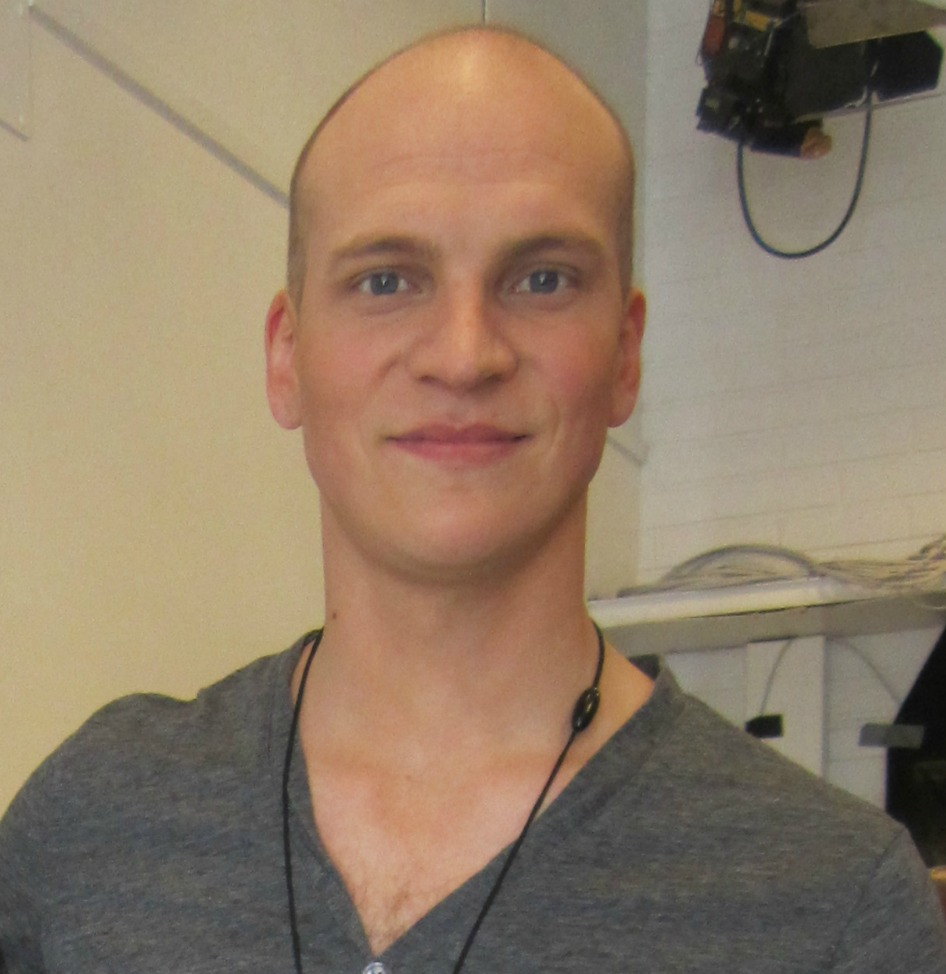
Nieminen in 2013

Riku Nieminen (born 5 May 1986) is a Finnish actor and dancer. He is best known for having appeared in the first five seasons of the sketch comedy television show Putous and for his character Munamies ("Eggy"). Nieminen also appeared as one of the judges on the seventh season of Tanssii tähtien kanssa, a Finnish version of the British television series Strictly Come Dancing.

== Personal life ==
Since 2009, Nieminen has been actively involved in the Zeitgeist Movement. He was married to the actress Annika Poijärvi until 2020.

== Selected filmography ==
=== In films ===
- Risto (2011)
- 21 tapaa pilata avioliitto (2013)
- Juice (2018)
- Spede (2023)

=== On television ===
- Ihmebantu (2009)
- Putous (2010–2014, 2015)
- Vedetään hatusta (2011–2012)
- Paparazzit (2012)
- Roba (2012–2016)
- Tanssii tähtien kanssa (2012)
- Kingi (2015)
- 1001 Rikua (2015)
- Talent Suomi (2016)
- Heikoin lenkki (2017)
- Deadwind (2018)
