= Kolmoskanava =

Finnish television station

- Country: Finland
- Broadcast area: Finland
- Headquarters: Helsinki

Programming
- Picture format: PAL 576i (4:3 SDTV)

Ownership
- Owner: Oy Kolmostelevisio Ab (Joint venture between MTV Oy, Yle and Nokia)

History
- Founded: 25 November 1985; 40 years ago
- Launched: 1 December 1986; 39 years ago
- Closed: 31 December 1992; 32 years ago
- Replaced by: MTV3

Kolmoskanava (also known as TV3 and informally as Kolmonen) was a Finnish free-to-air television station owned and operated by Oy Kolmostelevisio Ab, a joint venture between MTV Oy, Yle and Nokia. The latter's interest in television operations stemmed from the fact that the channel was originally planned to be an encrypted, over-the-air channel, as it was also involved in receiver manufacturing at the time, especially in the European hotel TV business; it is said that the company would manufacture decoders for the channel.

The channel was launched on December 1, 1986, and closed on the New Year's Eve night of December 31, 1992 with MTV3 starting its broadcasts simultaneously. Being the first nationwide commercial channel in Finland, Kolmoskanava did not produce any of its programmes themselves, instead relying on imported programmes (mostly TV shows and movies from North America), sports and a small number of Finnish programmes, most notably the bingo game show Megavisa, which aired from 1991 until 1992 on Kolmoskanava, and from 1993 until 1995 on its successor channel MTV3.

== History ==
Yleisradio had financed its television operations, which began in the late 1950s, with license fees and by renting airtime to Oy Mainos-TV-Reklam Ab (since 1982 MTV Oy), which obtained its income by selling advertising time. At the beginning of the 1980s, the changes that took place in the media field, such as the entry of various cable channels and video recorders into the market, were feared to take viewers away from Yleisradio and MTV. Local radio stations that started in 1985 were also feared to threaten MTV's advertising sales. Oy Kolmostelevisio Ab was founded in November 1985 to secure Yleisradio's and MTV's position and advertising revenue and to prevent the press from entering the industry.

On 1 December 1986, Kolmoskanava made its first broadcast from the Espoo transmitter; the first program broadcast was the feature film The Sound of Music. During the channel's first nine months, feature films, sports broadcasts (notably hockey) and other programs were broadcast nightly with limited transmission hours of at least an hour, which meant a single screen could accommodate three days of program information.

During 1987–1988, Kolmoskanava's coverage area expanded to include Pirkanmaa, Päijät-Häme and southwest Finland. Its coverage area expanded further in the following years so that when Kolmoskanava became MTV3 in early 1993, its coverage initially excluded some northernmost areas, although Ruka, Utsjoki and Taivalkoski were also included in early 1993.

The channel took a break in July 1987, in August the program included pilot episodes of series in addition to films, and on September 1, 1987 the channel's transmission hours were expanded to cover late afternoons and early evenings and its programs also diversified considerably. Still, Kolmoskanava's program was sparse compared to Yle's existing TV1 and TV2 channels, as the channel usually ended transmissions earlier than the two said channels.
