= Tuntematon sotilas =

Tuntematon sotilas, Finnish for "unknown soldier", may refer to:

- The Unknown Soldier (novel), a 1954 novel by Väinö Linna
- The Unknown Soldier (1955 film), a film adaption based on the novel by Väinö Linna, directed by Edvin Laine
- The Unknown Soldier (1985 film), a film adaption based on the novel by Väinö Linna, directed by Rauni Mollberg
- The Unknown Soldier (2017 film), a film adaption based on the unedited Sotaromaani (lit. A War Novel) version of the novel by Väinö Linna, directed by Aku Louhimies

== See also ==
- Unknown Soldier (disambiguation)
