= Independence Day (Finland) =

Public holiday in Finland held on 6 December

Independence Day of Finland
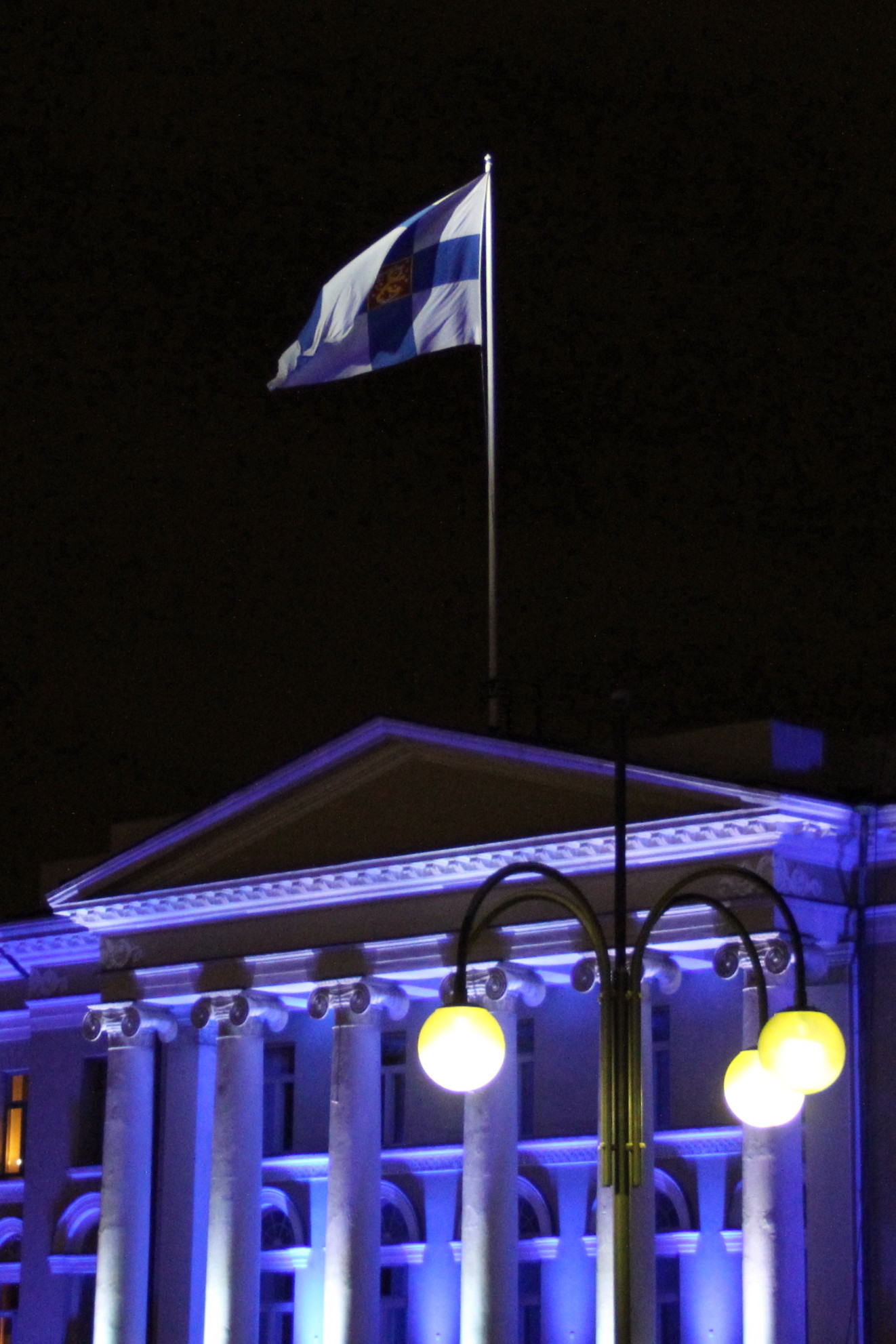
- Observed by: Finland
- Significance: The day the Declaration of Independence was adopted by the Parliament of Finland
- Celebrations: Concerts, balls
- Date: December 6
- Next time: 6 December 2026
- Frequency: Annual
- Related to: Declaration of Independence

Independence Day (Finnish: itsenäisyyspäivä [ˈitsenæi̯syːsˌpæi̯ʋæ]; Swedish: självständighetsdagen) is a national public holiday in Finland and a flag flying day held on 6 December to celebrate Finland's declaration of independence from Russia after the Bolsheviks took power in late 1917.

== History ==
The movement for Finland's independence started after the revolutions in Russia, caused by disturbances inside Russia from hardships connected to the First World War. This gave Finland an opportunity to withdraw from Russian rule. After several disagreements between the non-socialists and the social-democrats over who should have power in Finland, on 4 December 1917, the Senate of Finland, led by Pehr Evind Svinhufvud, finally made a Declaration of Independence which was adopted by the Finnish parliament two days later.

Independence Day was first celebrated in 1917. However, during the first years of independence, 6 December in some parts of Finland was only a minor holiday compared to 16 May, the Whites' day of celebration for prevailing in the Finnish Civil War. The left parties would have wanted to celebrate 15 November, because the people of Finland (represented by parliament) took power 15 November 1917. When a year had passed since declaration of independence, 6 December 1918, the academic people celebrated the day.

== Observance ==
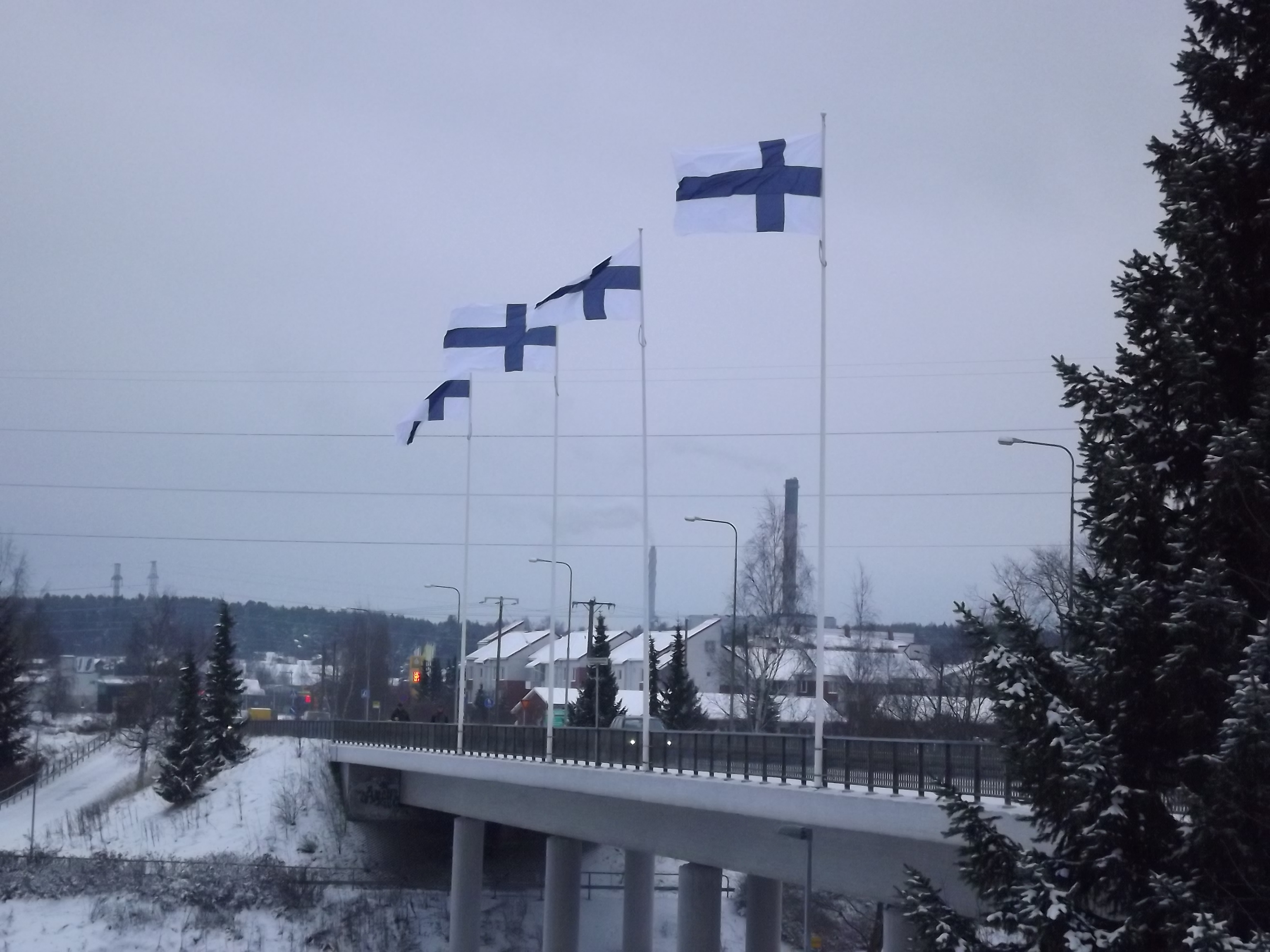
Flying the flag of Finland is part of the Independence Day theme.

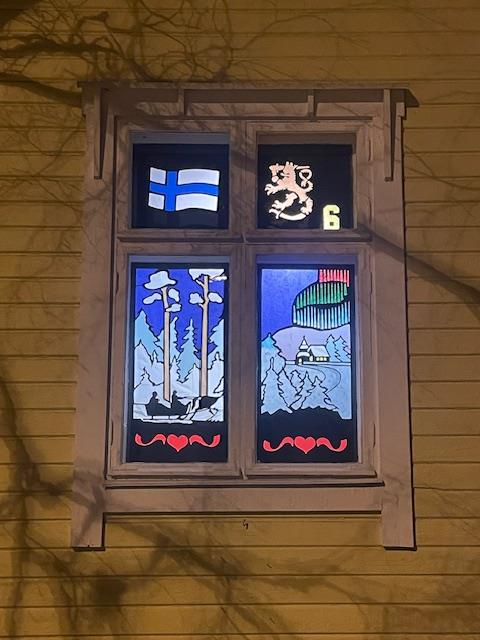
Window decoration following the theme of the Advent calendar

During the early decades of independence, occasion marked by patriotic speeches and special church services. From the 1970s onwards, however, Independence Day celebrations have taken livelier forms, with shops decorating their windows in the blue and white of the Finnish flag, and bakeries producing cakes with blue and white icing.

It is traditional for Finnish families to light two candles in each window of their home in the evening. This custom dates to the 1920s, but even earlier, candles had been placed in Finnish windows on poet Johan Ludvig Runeberg's birthday as a silent protest against Russian oppression. A popular legend has it that two candles were used as a sign to inform young Finnish men on their way to Sweden and Germany to become jägers that the house was ready to offer shelter and keep them hidden from the Russians.

== State festivities ==
Official Independence Day festivities usually commence with the raising of the Finnish flag on Tähtitorninmäki ("Observatory Hill") in Helsinki. A religious service is held at Helsinki Cathedral, and official visits are made to the war memorials of World War II. Another event is the annual military parade by personnel of the Finnish Defense Forces, which is one of the big highlights and is a nationally televised event.

A 1955 film The Unknown Soldier is the traditional part of the television program for Independence Day. Reino Tolvanen as Antero Rokka in the film.

YLE, Finland's national public service broadcaster, broadcasts the 1955 film adaptation of The Unknown Soldier (Finnish: Tuntematon Sotilas), based on Väinö Linna's iconic novel. In most years, the original 1955 film has been shown (dozens of times) and every year since 2000, but the 1985 version has also been shown once, in 1997, and in addition to the 2017 version premiered in 2021.

The traditional torch cavalcade by students has been held annually since 1951. The cavalcade is held in various towns and cities with a university and wreaths are placed on war graves.

In the evening, the Presidential Independence Day reception is held for approximately 2,000 invited guests at the Presidential Palace. This event, known informally also as Linnanjuhlat ("the Castle Ball"), is broadcast on national television and has been a perennial favourite of the viewing public. The first presidential ball was organized in 1919, and the event has been held most years since.

The reception invariably attracts the attention of demonstrators in support of various causes, and various demonstrations and shadow parties are held to coincide with the official event. The late philanthropist Veikko Hursti organized the most popular of these demonstrations, providing free food to the poor and underprivileged. Since Hursti's death in 2005, the tradition has been carried on by his son, Heikki Hursti.

The most popular television segment of the Independence Day reception is the entrance of the guests. These include persons who receive invitations every year, including the knights of the Mannerheim Cross (traditionally the first ones to enter), members of the government and the Parliament of Finland, archbishops, judges, high military and police officers, and various diplomats and dignitaries. The second group includes guests of the president's own choosing: typically entertainers, activists, sportspersons, and in general, people who have been in the spotlight over the past year. The last guests to enter are always the surviving former Finnish presidents.

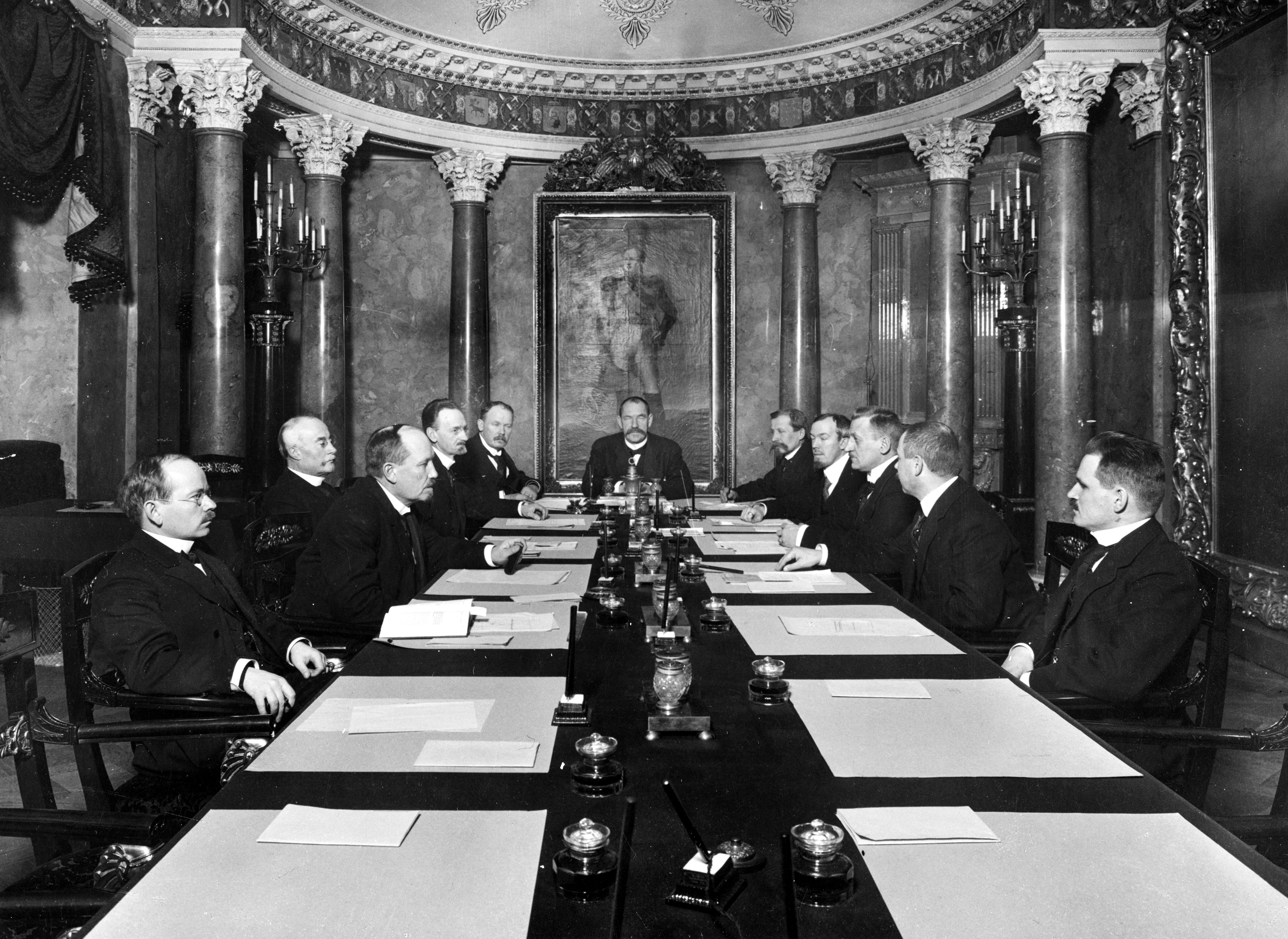
The Finnish Senate of 1917, Prime Minister P. E. Svinhufvud at the head of table

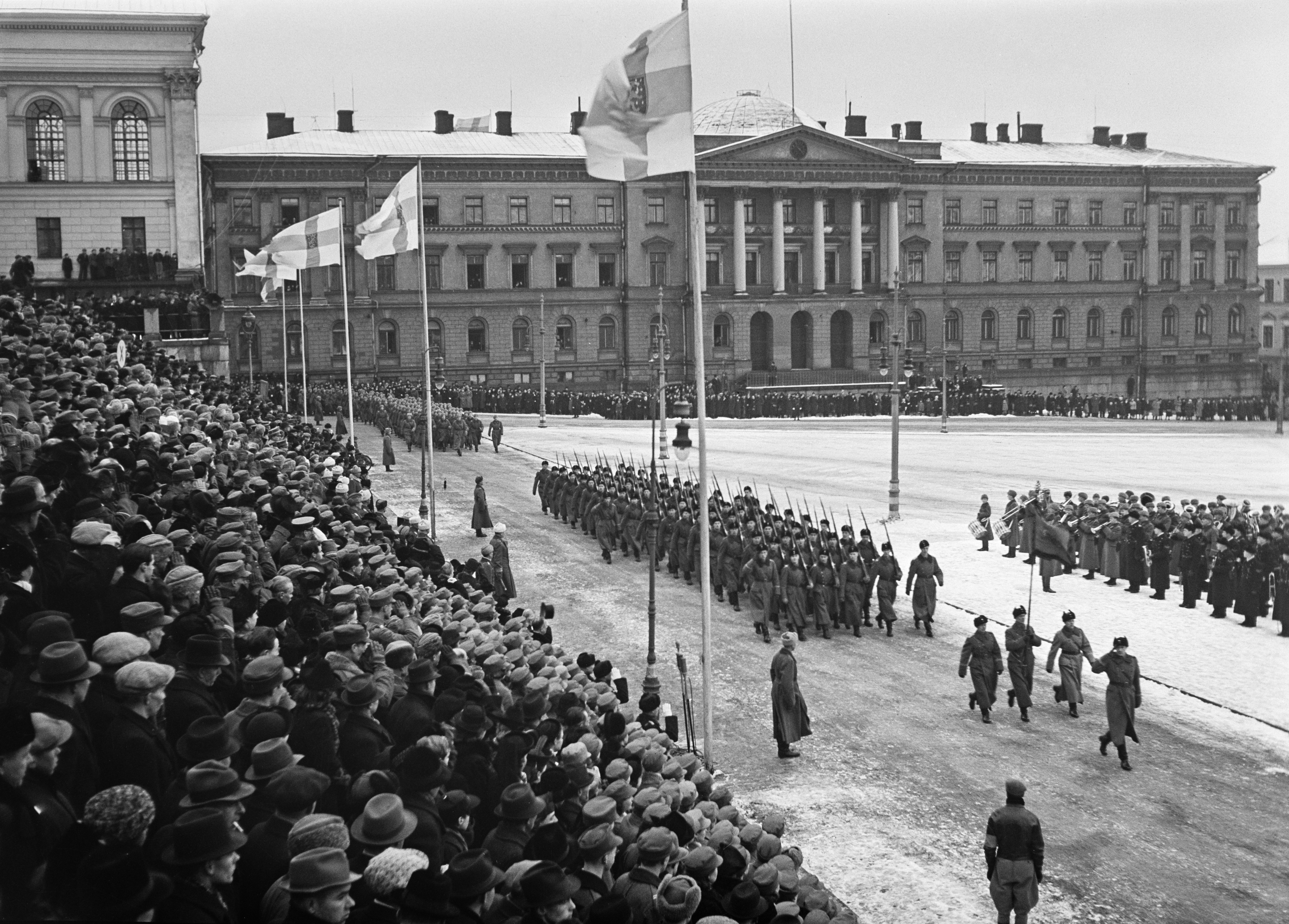
Finland's Independence Day celebrations in Helsinki, 1940

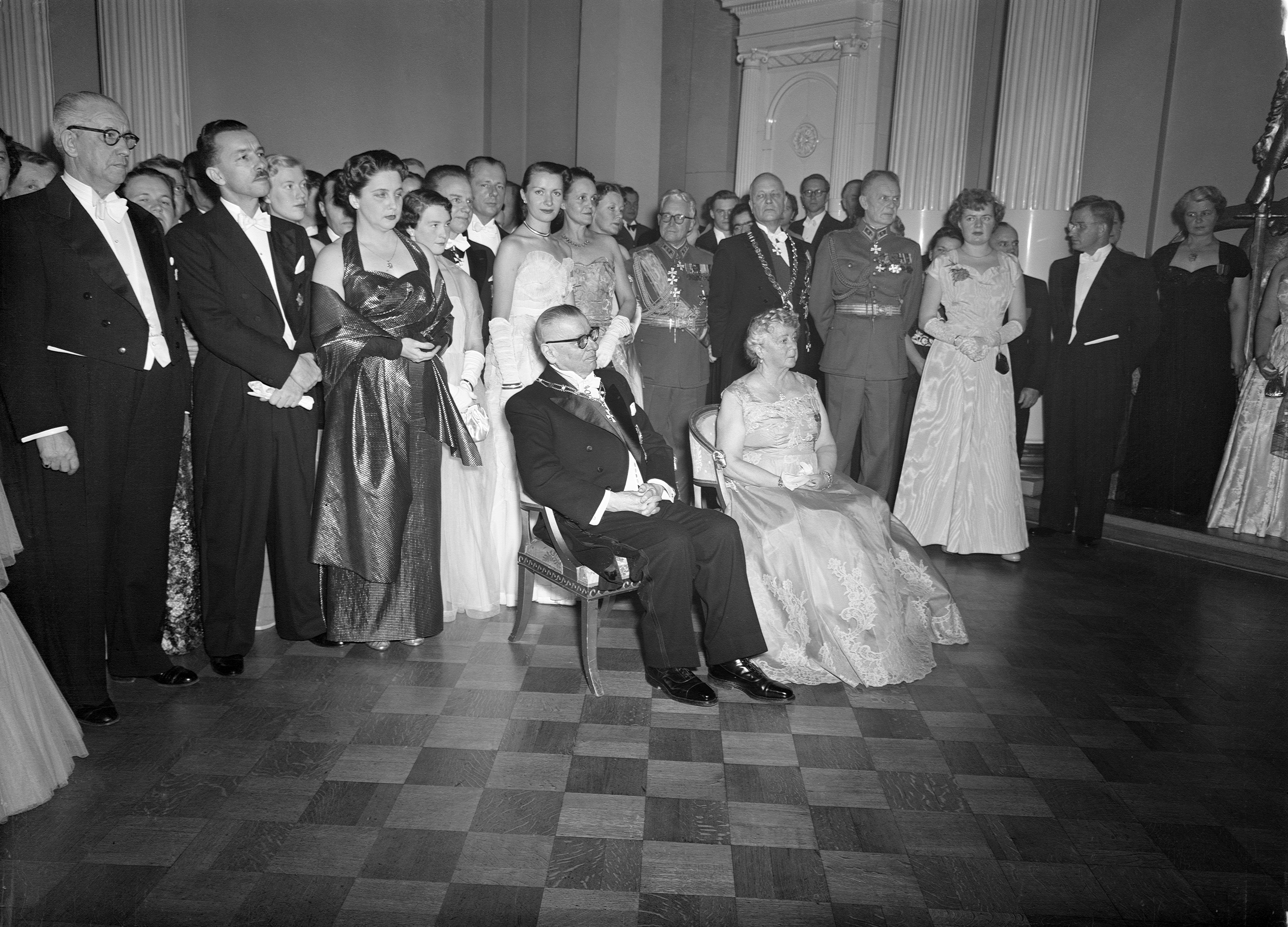
President J. K. Paasikivi and Mrs Alli Paasikivi with their guests during the Independence Day Reception, 1953

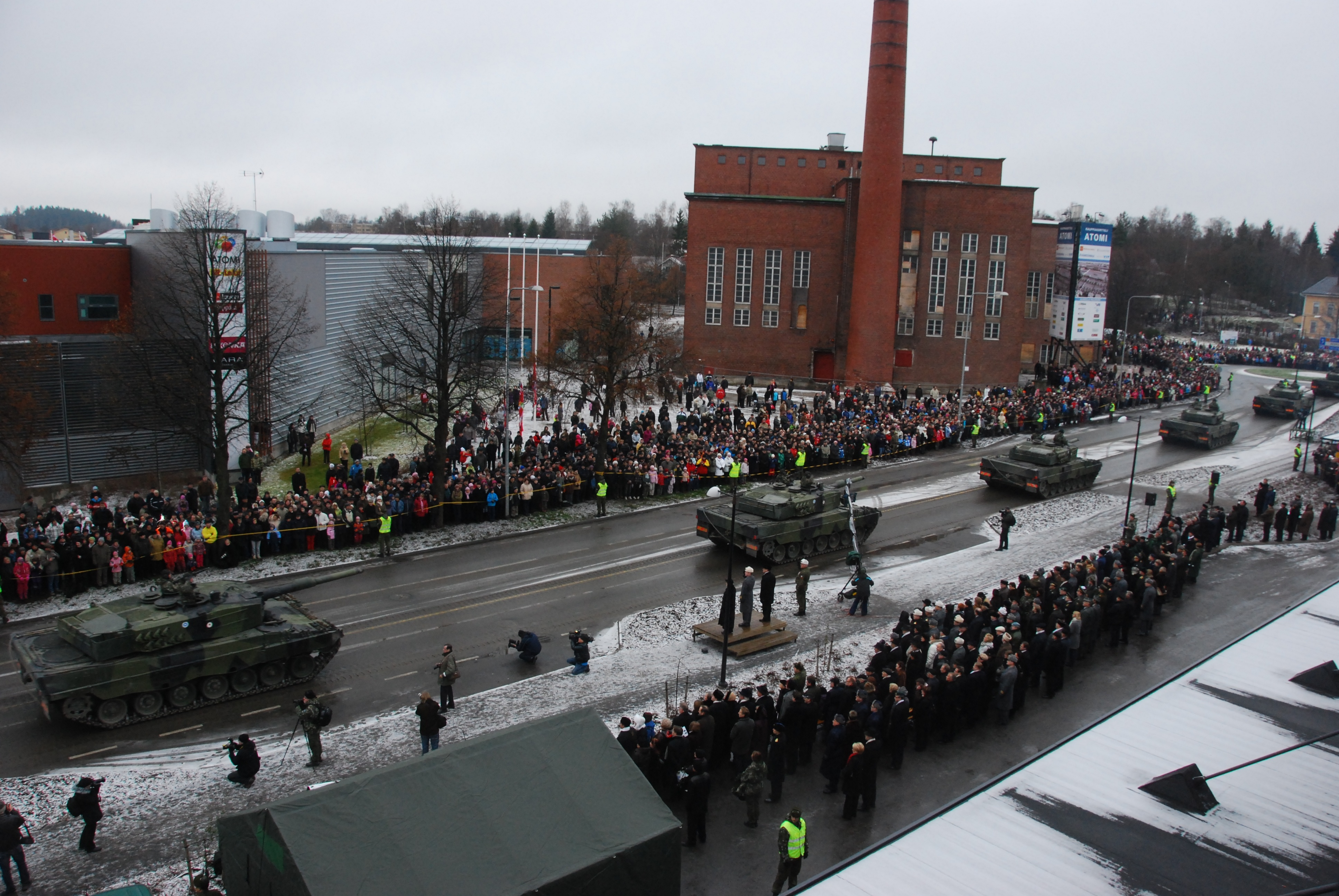
Finnish Independence Day Parade, 2009

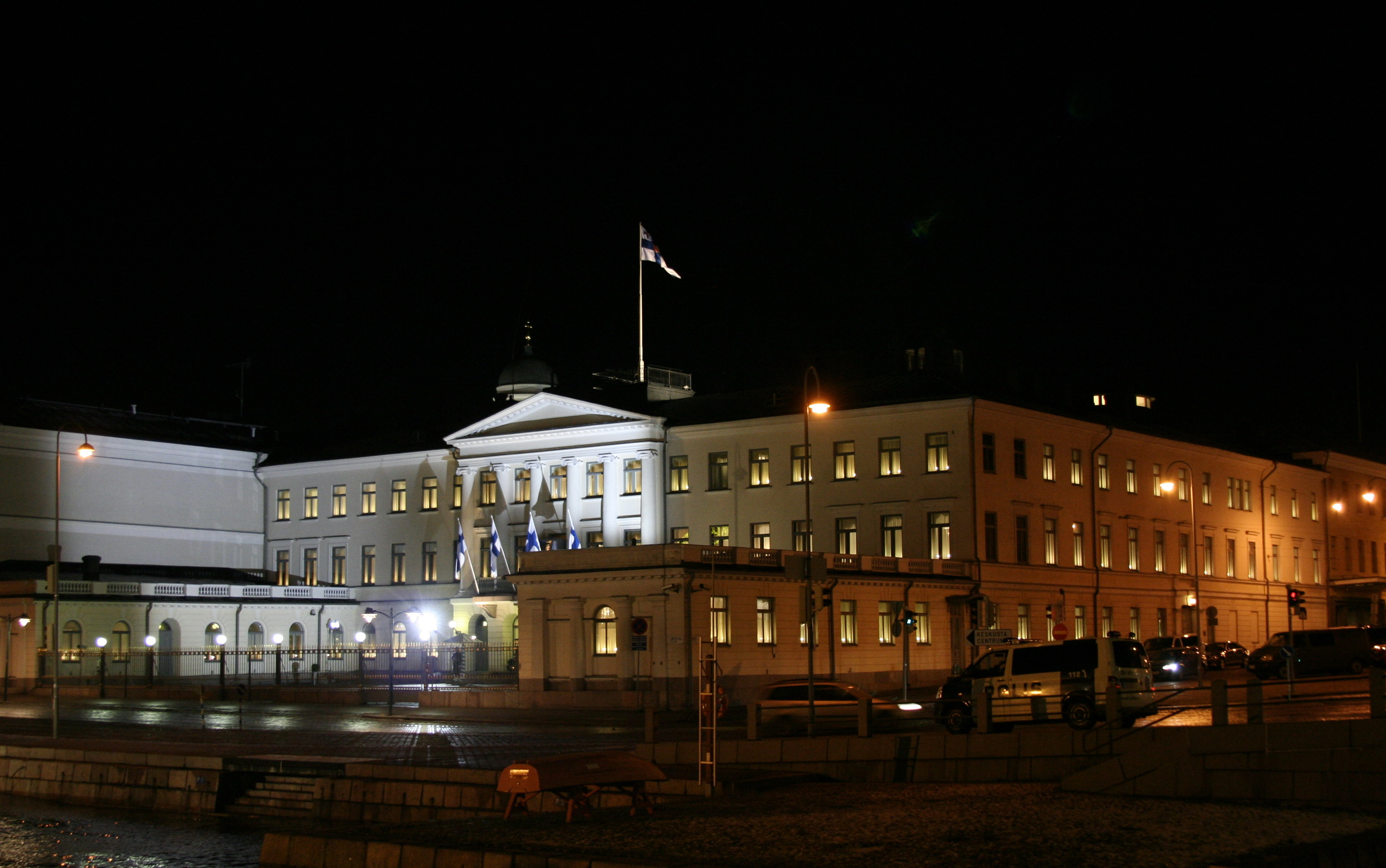
The Presidential Palace during the Independence Day Reception, 2011

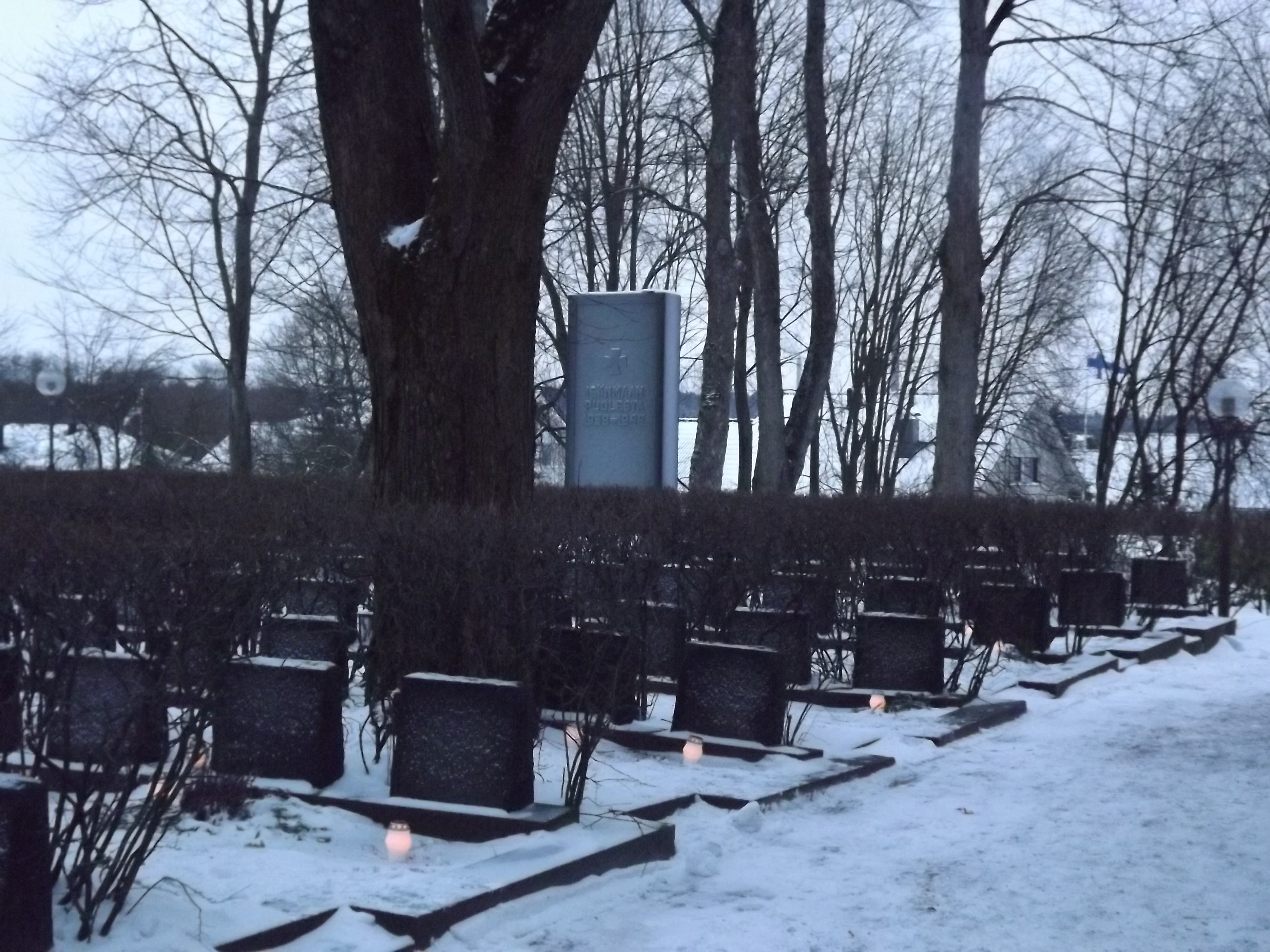
Candles at the hero's grave on Independence Day, 2012

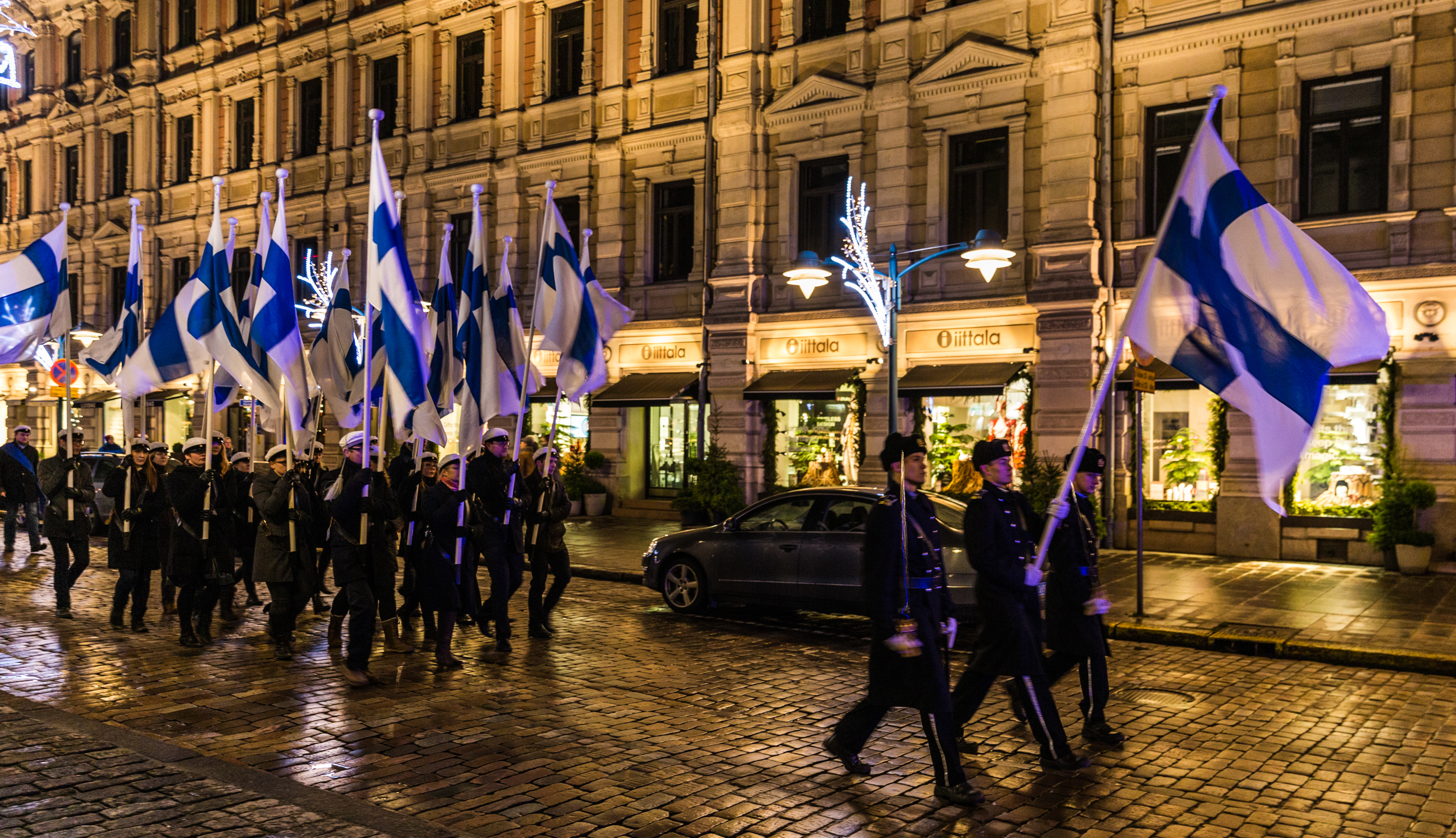
Students' torch cavalcade on Independence Day, 2015

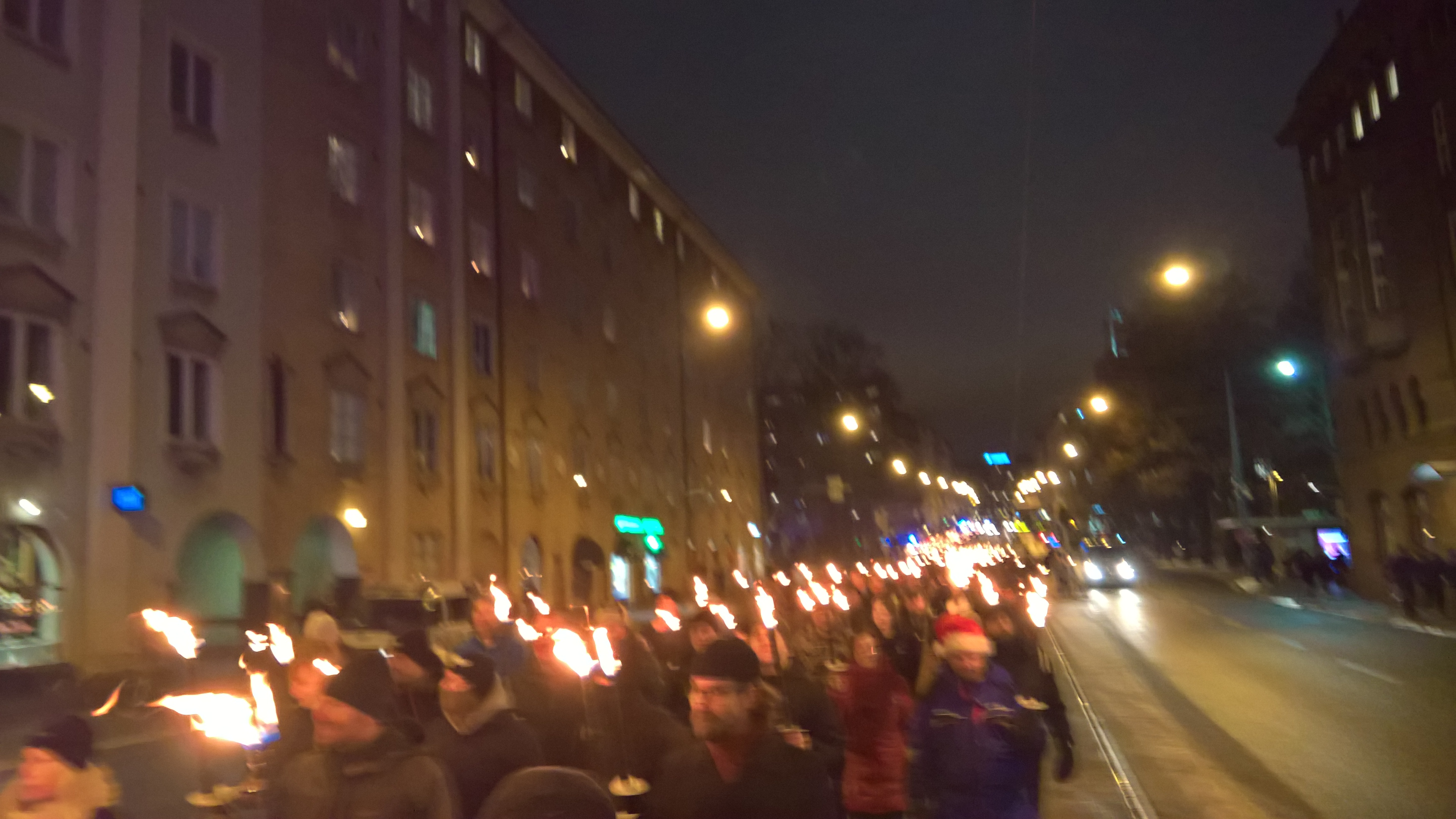
The 612 march at Runeberginkatu, 2017

== 90th anniversary commemorative coin ==
90th anniversary of Finland's Declaration of Independence commemorative coin

The 90th anniversary of Finland's Declaration of Independence was selected as the main motif for a high-value commemorative coin, the €5 90th anniversary of Finland's Declaration of Independence commemorative coin, minted in 2007. The reverse shows petroglyphic aesthetics, while the obverse has a nine-oar boat with rowers, symbolizing collaboration as a true Finnish trait. Signs of music and Finnish kantele strings can be discerned in the coin's design.

== 100th anniversary ==
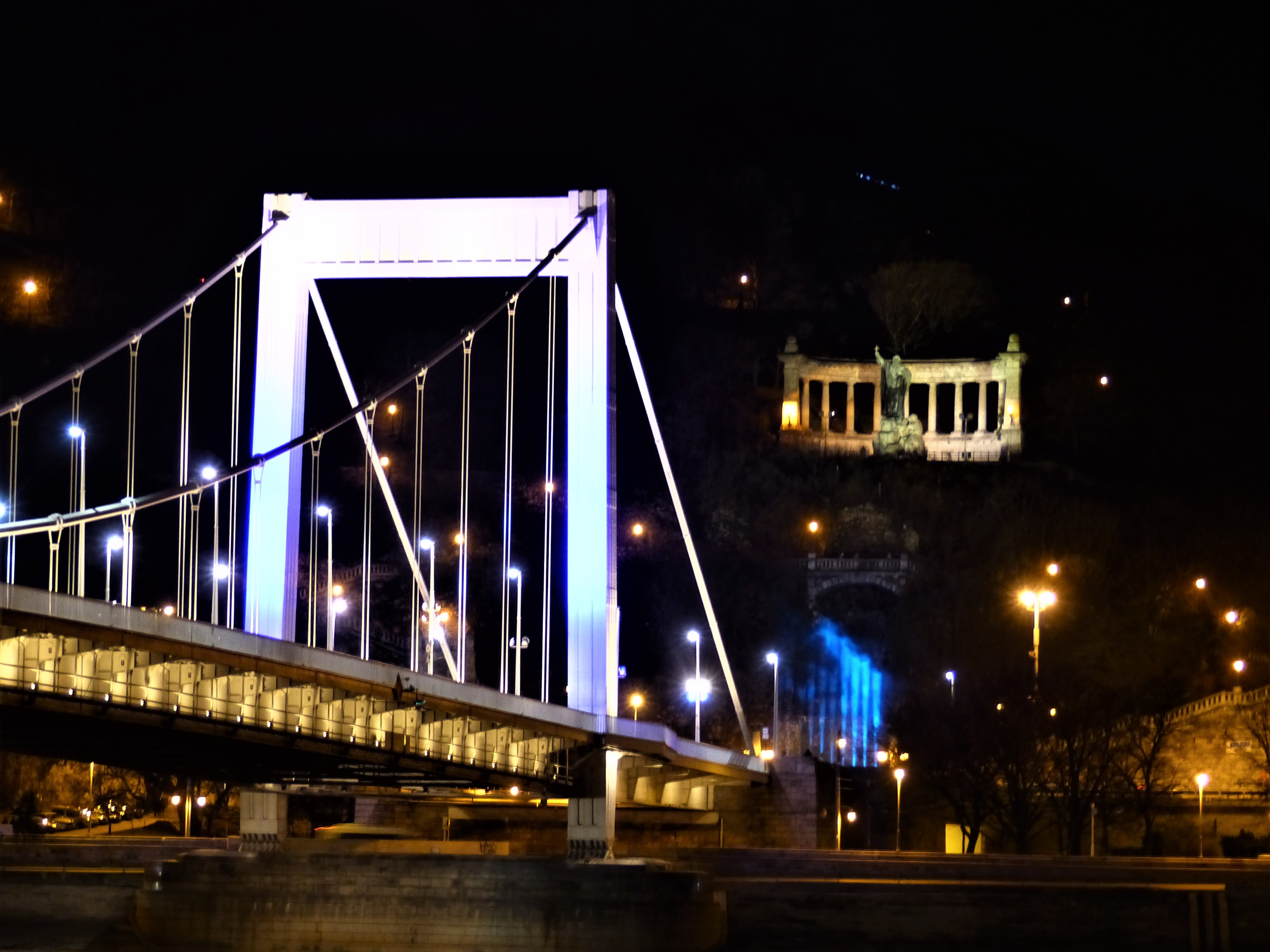
Erzsébet híd and Gellérthegy – lit in Finland's honour

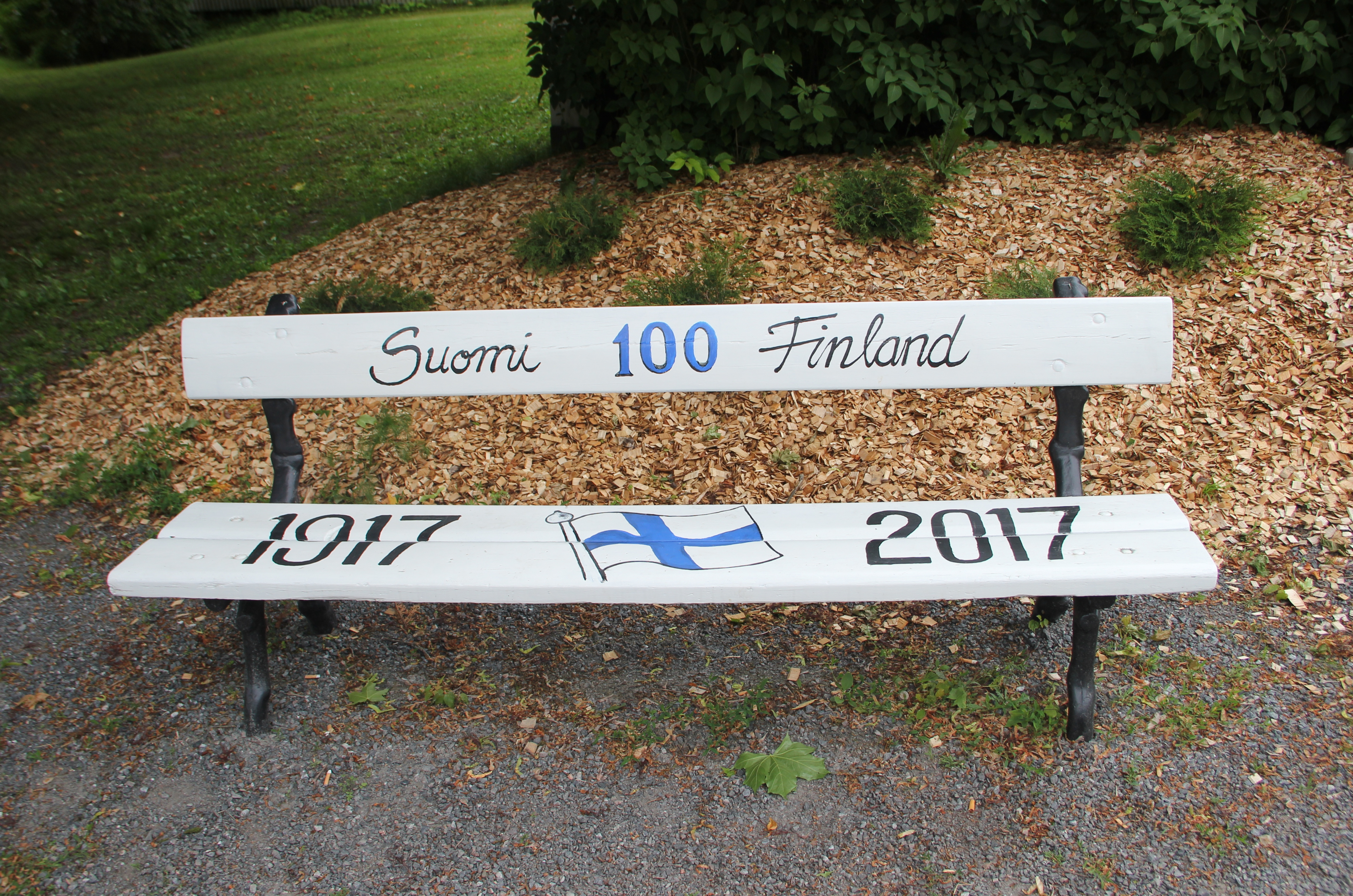
Bench in Ekenäs

The centenary of Finland's independence was celebrated in 2017. The theme was "Together."

=== Global illuminations ===
Country, city, site illuminated:

- Argentina: Buenos Aires, the Usina del Arte
- Australia: Adelaide, Adelaide Town Hall
- Australia Brisbane, Story Bridge and Victoria Bridge
- Australia: Canberra, Telstra Tower, the Old Parliament House, Malcolm Fraser Bridge, Questacon – The National Science and Technology Centre (Parkes)
- Australia: Hobart, Railway Roundabout Fountain, Elizabeth Street Mall and the Kennedy Lane Tourism Precinct
- Australia: Perth, the Council House building and Trafalgar Bridge
- Austria: Vienna, the Wiener Riesenrad Ferris wheel
- Brazil: Rio de Janeiro, The Christ the Redeemer statue
- Bulgaria: Sofia, the National Palace of Culture
- Canada: Niagara Falls
- Cyprus: Nicosia, The White Walls building
- Czech Republic: Prague, the Dancing House designed by Frank Gehry
- Estonia: Tallinn, Stenbock House (the seat of the government)
- Estonia: Tartu, the Vanemuine Theatre, Võidu sild Bridge
- Ethiopia: Addis Ababa, Lion of Judah monument in front of the Ethiopian National Theatre
- Greece: Athens, the Arch of Hadrian
- Hungary: Budapest, Elizabeth Bridge
- Iceland: Reykjavik, Harpa Concert Hall and Conference Center
- Ireland: Dublin, Mansion House, the residence of the Lord Mayor of Dublin
- Italy: Rome, The Colosseum
- Kazakhstan: Astana, the bridges across the Ishim River, St. Regis hotel
- Latvia: Jelgava, railway bridge
- Latvia: Riga, the tower of the town hall in the Old Town, the railway bridge across the Daugava river
- Lithuania: Vilnius, Three Crosses monument
- Mexico: Mexico City, the Angel of Independence monument (Ángel de la Independencia)
- Mozambique: Maputo, Maputo Fortress
- Netherlands: Alkmaar, Stadskantine Alkmaar
- Norway: Oslo, Holmenkollen ski jumping hill
- Poland: Warsaw, the Palace of Culture and Science
- Portugal: Lisbon, Belém Tower (a UNESCO World Heritage Site)
- Russia: Lumivaara in Ladoga Karelia, Lumivaara Church
- Russia: Moscow, Embassy of Finland
- Russia: Petrozavodsk, the National Theatre
- Russia: Saint Petersburg, the Museum of Ethnography
- Serbia: Belgrade, Ada Bridge, Palace Albania
- Sweden: Stockholm, Globen
- Switzerland: Montreux, the Mannerheim memorial
- Ukraine: Kyiv, Embassy of Finland
- United Kingdom: Newcastle, the Gateshead Millennium Bridge

== See also ==
- History of Finland
- Independence Day Reception (Finland)
- Timeline of Independence of Finland (1917–1920)
- 612 march
