= Unknown Soldier =

Unknown Soldier may refer to:

== Places ==
- Tomb of the Unknown Soldier, a type of memorial site in many nations
- The British grave of The Unknown Warrior in Westminster Abbey

== Literature ==
- The Unknown Soldier (novel), a 1954 novel by Finnish writer Väinö Linna
- "Unknown Soldier" (short story), a short story by Kurt Vonnegut

== Film ==
- The Unknown Soldier (1926 film)
- The Unknown Soldier (1955 film), a Finnish film based on the novel by Väinö Linna
- Unknown Soldier (1968 film), a film by Donald Shebib
- The Unknown Soldier (1985 film), a Finnish film based on the novel by Väinö Linna
- The Unknown Soldier (1998 miniseries), a British miniseries featuring Aislín McGuckin
- The Unknown Soldier (2006 film), a German documentary film by Michael Verhoeven about the Wehrmachtsausstellung
- The Unknown Soldier (2017 film), a Finnish film based on the novel by Väinö Linna

== Music ==
- Unknown Soldier (Fela Kuti album), 1979
- The Unknown Soldier (album), a 1980 album by Roy Harper, or its title song
- Unknown Soldier (Warmen album), 2000, or its title song
- "The Unknown Soldier" (song), a 1968 song by the Doors
- "Unknown Soldier", a song by Breaking Benjamin, and is the fourth single from the album Phobia
- "Unknown Soldier", a song by the Casualties from On the Front Line
- "Unknown Soldiers", (Hebrew: חיילים אלמונים, romanized: Hayalim Almonim), an anthem of Lehi, by Avraham Stern.

== Comics ==
- Unknown Soldier (Ace Comics), a superhero character
- Unknown Soldier (DC Comics), the name of several distinct characters

== Other uses ==
- "The Unknown Warrior", an episode of Strange Experiences
- "Unknown Soldier" (Between the Lines), a 1994 television episode
- "Unknown Soldiers" (A Touch of Frost), a 1996 television episode
- "Unknown Soldier" (The Unit), a 2009 television episode
- William Eckert or Unknown Soldier, Major League Baseball commissioner
- The Unknown Soldiers, protagonists of Forgotten Worlds

== See also ==
- The Unknown Warrior, in Westminster Abbey
- Unknown Child (Titanic victim), a victim of the Titanic disaster
