= Jorma Kariluoto =

Fictional human

Kariluoto as played by Johannes Holopainen in the 2017 film version

Jorma Juhani Kariluoto is a fictional character in Väinö Linna's 1954 war novel The Unknown Soldier and one of its main characters. At the beginning of the novel, he is a sergeant major, like Vilho Koskela, but later during the Continuation War he rises to lieutenant and eventually even captain.

Linna said in one of his last interviews that Kariluoto was a typical AKS officer whose idealism evaporates in the whirlwind of war.

== In the novel ==
Kariluoto is a blond-haired university student planning a career as a lawyer when he goes to war. Since childhood, he had heard his father and his friends talk countless times about East Karelia, where the tribal people living there suffered oppression and whose liberation was a great task for the Finns, which could never be left in mind – it had to be thought about while working, eating and going to bed, and it should have been something he dreamed about at night.

As an idealistic sergeant major, he does not inspire as much respect in men as Koskela (although he does not arouse as much disgust as Lammio) but later he achieves great respect after rising to company commander. At first, Kariluoto was quite weak and fearful, but after seeing Captain Kaarna's death up close, he became braver and grew into a skilled soldier towards the end.

When the Finns arrive in Petrozavodsk, Kariluoto would like to look at the city with pride, but the first person to see the city is the low-class and grotesque soldier Viirilä, towards whom Kariluoto feels great disgust; in his high school world, it was not believed that Finns like Viirilä even existed. However, the modesty of the city also disappoints Kariluoto, especially when Kariluoto gets closer to witnessing the complete chaos prevailing in the city: drunk people are walking the streets, local women are being harassed, and drunken singing, brawling, and shooting can be heard from everywhere.

Kariluoto's maturation into a soldier and an excellent officer is such a central plot in the novel that it has been considered his development story. During his short military life, he searches for a role model to identify with: first there is the Runebergian war hero, then the figure of Captain Kaarna, and after his fall, sergeant major Koskela. Kariluoto becomes one of the battalion's best team leaders and gradually gains more courage. During the war, he enters the Army Academy, rises to the rank of captain, and marries his fiancée Sirkka.

He returns to his unit as a company commander, newly married and in high spirits, unaware that a major Soviet offensive has begun in the meantime. Faced with a surrendering army and hearing that the otherwise calm Koskela also considers the situation hopeless, Kariluoto is completely crushed mentally; the collision with the reality of the front is so severe that Kariluoto goes from optimism to the exact opposite state, almost a mental disorder, in a few hours. Finally, he receives an order from the battalion commander, which even Koskela advises him not to obey, acts of his own free will and kills not only a number of his own men but also himself under enemy fire.

== Performers ==
Kariluoto as played by Matti Ranin in the 1955 version

In the 1955 The Unknown Soldier film, directed by Edvin Laine, Kariluoto was played by Matti Ranin. In the 1985 version, directed by Rauni Mollberg, Kariluoto was played by Pekka Ketonen, and in the 2017 version, directed by Aku Louhimies, Kariluoto was played by Johannes Holopainen.
