= Urho Hietanen =

Fictional human

Hietanen as played by Aku Hirviniemi in the 2017 film version

Urho Hietanen is a fictional character in Väinö Linna's 1954 war novel The Unknown Soldier. He is one of the main characters in the novel.

Hietanen is considered to be inspired by Väinö Linna's comrade-in-arms, Sergeant Pauli Santa (1919–1982) from Vehmaa; however, Hietanen's fate is different from that of his role model, as Linna had freely combined and altered events in this regard, and some features may have also been taken from a couple of other people. The destruction of the Kliment Voroshilov tank with an anti-tank mine, which is described as the most heroic act by Hietanen, is also based on a true incident witnessed by Linna with his own eyes.

== In the novel ==
Hietanen is an optimist and a joker from the Southwest Finland who has a benevolent attitude towards everything in an effort to maintain the mood of the entire team. Originally, Hietanen was a corporal, but he is promoted to sergeant when he manages to destroy an enemy tank with an anti-tank mine in battle. He helps starving children in captured Petrozavodsk. When Corporal Lehto shoots a surrendered Russian soldier in the back, Hietanen's humanity is clearly shown. The East Karelian teacher Vera, who he meets in Petrozavodsk and is a fervent communist, also makes Hietanen blush and feel awkward and inferior. Hietanen is wounded by a grenade fragment while rushing to help a young reservist, losing both eyes. He eventually dies under enemy fire while stepping out of a burning ambulance while trying as blind to help others trapped in the ambulance to escape.

Of the characters in the novel, Hietanen is almost the only one who develops and changes: from a talkative and childish young man, he has become a quiet adult man who often stares off into the distance in the spring of 1944. Hietanen, who has risen to the position of team leader, is particularly concerned about the young and inexperienced rookies. The narrator of the novel also shows the cruelty of the entire war in the wounding and death of Hietanen, who suffers the most gruesome fate of all the characters in the novel.

== Performers ==
Hietanen as played by Heikki Savolainen in the 1955 version

In the 1955 The Unknown Soldier film, directed by Edvin Laine, Hietanen was played by Heikki Savolainen. In the 1985 version, directed by Rauni Mollberg, Hietanen was played by Pirkka-Pekka Petelius, and in the 2017 version, directed by Aku Louhimies, Hietanen was played by Aku Hirviniemi.
