= Lapland War (film) =

- Directed by: Aku Louhimies
- Screenplay by: Antti Tuuri; Aku Louhimies
- Produced by: Andrei Alén; Aku Louhimies; Sirkka Rautiainen; Jukka Valtanen
- Music by: Lasse Enersen
- Production companies: Backmann & Hoderoff
- Distributed by: Nordisk Film Finland
- Release date: 23 October 2026
- Languages: Finnish, Swedish, German
- Budget: €5.2 million

Lapland War (Finnish: Lapin sota) is a 2026 Finnish independent war drama film directed by Aku Louhimies, an adaptation of the 2012 novel by Antti Tuuri, Rauta-antura (2012) . The film depicts the Lapland War, a 1944-1945 war between Finland and Nazi Germany. The actors include Luukas Niskanen, Sannah Nedergård, Peter Franzén and Volker Bruch.

== Historical background ==
The Lapland War (1944–1945) was a conflict between Finland and Nazi Germany in Finnish Lapland. It followed the Continuation War (1941–1944), during which Finland and Germany fought as co-belligerents against the Soviet Union. The Finns referred to the Germans as aseveljet ("brothers in arms"), reflecting the close but complicated wartime alliance.

Under the terms of the Moscow Armistice signed on 19 September 1944, Finland was obligated to expel German forces from its territory. What had been an alliance turned into an armed conflict as approximately 200,000 Wehrmacht troops withdrew through Lapland, destroying infrastructure and entire towns—most notably Rovaniemi—in a scorched earth campaign.

Finland's wartime position was distinctive among Germany's allies. Despite its military cooperation with Nazi Germany, Finland maintained its democratic institutions and refused to deport its Jewish citizens. The approximately 2,000 Jews living in Finland, including those serving in the Finnish Defence Forces, were not persecuted, and Finland did not implement anti-Jewish legislation. This aspect of Finnish wartime history forms part of the moral backdrop explored in the film.

The novel Rauta-antura by Antti Tuuri, on which the film is based, portrays the experiences of Finnish soldiers and civilians caught in this dramatic reversal of alliances and the resulting destruction of Finnish Lapland.

== Cast ==
- Peter Franzén as pastor Vainio
- Sannah Nedergård as Saara
- Luukas Niskanen as Heikki Ojala
- Volker Bruch as major Duisberg
- Pyry Kähkönen as Arvo Ketola
- Dominic Raacke as Generaloberst Lothar Rendulic
- Olli Rahkonen as Ilola
- Hilma Kotkaniemi as Irene
- Ronja Kuoppamäki as Eva
- Amelie Blauberg as Kaarina
- Emma Kilpimaa as Hilkka
- Aino Louhimies as Elvi
- Elli Arstila as Liisa
- Panu Mikkola as Talala
- Akseli Reimaluoto as Päkkilä
- Onni Parviainen as Rasvala
- Petteri Summanen
- Jari Virman
- Taisto Oksanen as major Reunanen
- Tuuli Mattila as Heikki's mother

== Production ==
The film is based on the 2012 novel Rauta-antura ("Iron Heel") by Antti Tuuri, who also co-wrote the screenplay with director Aku Louhimies. It is Louhimies' second major war film after The Unknown Soldier (2017), which became one of Finland's highest-grossing films of all time.

The production company Backmann & Hoderoff produced the film with a budget of €5.2 million, with funding from the Finnish Film Foundation. The film features an international cast, including German actors Volker Bruch and Dominic Raacke alongside Finnish leads Peter Franzén, Luukas Niskanen and Sannah Nedergård. The film is performed in Finnish, Swedish and German.

Principal photography began in August 2025 in Finnish Lapland and continued through December 2025. Key filming locations included Tornio and other historical sites across Finnish Lapland. The film was distributed by Nordisk Film Finland.

== Release ==
The film premiered in Finland on 23 October 2026 and was scheduled for premiere in Sweden on 8 January 2027.

== Reception ==
Reviews in Finland noted the spectacular views and focus on walking and the role of Sannah Nedergård as a woman who fraternizes with a German man. Matti Rämö on Suomen Kuvalehti found the film focused on the human angle, while Päivi Valotie on Turun Sanomat noted the credibility of the shots and the convincing performance by Luukas Niskanen as quiet young soldier. Taneli Topelius on Ilta-Sanomat also praised Niskanen's performance as a natural expression of the emotions of a quiet young man and described the film as focused on the male perspective and an appealing mix of realistic and hopeful.

The film was a major box office success in Finland. Its opening weekend drew over 80,000 viewers, a record for Finnish films in the 2020s, surpassing the previous record of around 40,000. By mid-November 2026, the film had surpassed 285,000 admissions, making it the most watched Finnish film of 2026 and one of the most successful Finnish films of the decade. The film has grossed approximately €4.4 million at the Finnish box office.

== See also ==
- List of Finnish films of the 2020s
- Lapland War
- Finnish literature
- Finnish military ranks
- Finland–Russia relations
- Finland–Germany relations
- Military history of Finland during World War II
