= Reino Tolvanen =

Finnish actor (1920–1974)

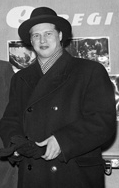
- Reino Tolvanen in 1955
- Born: 31 July 1920; Viipuri, Finland
- Died: 21 November 1974 (aged 54); Pretoria, South Africa

Reino Tolvanen (31 July 1920 – 21 November 1974) was a Finnish actor who played Antti Rokka in Edvin Laine's movie The Unknown Soldier, based on a book by Väinö Linna.

Born in Viipuri, Tolvanen fought in the Finnish army, navy and air force during the Winter War and Continuation War, including time as a machine gun sergeant, patrol boat commander and bomb aimer in Bristol Blenheim aircraft. Following the war, he worked as an agronomist, before moving to Australia in 1959 with his wife Kaija. The couple had three boys. Tolvanen found that he was unable to find work as an agronomist in Australia, and the family moved to South Africa in 1970.

Tolvanen worked as an agronomist until his death in Pretoria in 1974.

== Filmography ==
Year	Title	Role	Notes
1955	The Unknown Soldier	Rokka	
1957	Rakas varkaani	Avustaja	Uncredited, (final film role)
