= Antero Rokka =

Fictional human

Rokka as played by Eero Aho in the 2017 film version

Antero "Antti" Rokka is a fictional character in Väinö Linna's 1954 war novel The Unknown Soldier. Antero Rokka is a well-known figure in the story, and he has taken on an almost archetypal role in Finnish culture. According to Väinö Linna's own testimony, Rokka's character is based on Linna's comrade-in-arms, Viljam Pylkäs, as the two fought in the Continuation War (1941–44). It is also said that Linna borrowed the character's name from a real-life Ingrian soldier, Antti Rokka, whom Linna would have gotten to know after the war, and that the Rokka in the book would also have the character traits of the real Rokka.

== In the novel ==
Rokka is a farmer and family man from the Karelian Isthmus, who has the military rank of corporal. Rokka, who participated in the Winter War, joins the machine gun company in 1941 during the Continuation War, and is one of the oldest in the unit. As a fighter, he is very capable, being disrespectful to formal discipline, he ends up several times in disputes with Lieutenant Lammio. When ignoring the given orders, Rokka considers himself to be above the rules, and he is even ready to threaten to kill others if they try to bring him to justice. As a soldier, Rokka is above all very pragmatic in nature: he enjoys fighting, but not killing, because he feels no hatred towards the enemy. In his opinion, there are only two options in war: kill or be killed. As far as we know, Rokka's only, but even greater, motive for his participation in the war is to get his home region, the Karelian Isthmus, which was snatched from Finland as a result of the Winter War, back from the Soviets. Rokka is not a thinker either, instead he leaves the consideration of the morality of war to others.

== Performers ==
Rokka as played by Reino Tolvanen in the 1955 version

In the 1955 The Unknown Soldier film, directed by Edvin Laine, Rokka was played by amateur actor Reino Tolvanen. In the 1985 version, directed by Rauni Mollberg, Rokka was played by Paavo Liski, and in the 2017 version, directed by Aku Louhimies, Rokka was played by Eero Aho.
