= Eero Aho =

Finnish film, television, and theater actor (born 1968)

- Born: Eero-Matti Aho; 26 January 1968 (age 58); Oulu, Finland
- Education: Helsinki Theatre Academy
- Occupation: Actor
- Years active: 1991–present
- Employer(s): KOM-teatteri; Turku City Theatre; Finnish National Theatre
- Spouse(s): Tiina Lymi (m. 1994; div. 2006) Teresa Meriläinen (m. 2017)
- Children: 3 (including Ella Lymi)
- Awards: Jussi Award for Best Actor (2014); Jussi Award for Best Actor (2018)

Eero-Matti Aho (born 26 January 1968) is a Finnish actor who has appeared on stage, in films and on television. He plays Antero Rokka in film The Unknown Soldier (2017), and stars as Inspector Koskinen in the crime television series Lakeside Murders.

== Early life and education ==
According to a 2019 interview with the Helsingin Sanomat Aho was born on 26 January 1968 in Oulu, Finland and grew up in Pukinmäki. According to an interview with Ilta-Sanomat, Aho's mother's family were originally from Vyborg which was evacuated following the Vyborg–Petrozavodsk offensive during the Continuation War, his father was a train driver from Hamina. Aho studied at Kallio High School in Helsinki before being accepted to the Helsinki Theatre Academy in 1986 at the age of 18.

== Career ==
Aho graduated from the Helsinki Theatre Academy in 1991 and was quickly employed by the KOM-teatteri in Helsinki from 1991 to 2005. Since 2005 Aho has worked as a freelancer in multiple theatre, film, and television roles.

== Personal life ==
According to a 2025 interview with Ilta-Sanomat Aho has been married twice. Aho's first marriage was to Finnish actress Tiina Lymi in 1994, together they had one daughter, Ella Lymi. Aho and Tiina later divorced in 2006. From 2008 to 2013 Aho was in a relationship with Finnish actress Vuokko Hovatta. Aho later married Finnish journalist Teresa Meriläinen in 2017, together they have two children. Aho was close friends with Finnish director Reko Lundán and actor Pekka Valkeejärvi.

== Selected filmography ==
- Harjunpää ja kiusantekijät (1992)
- Romanovin kivet (1993)
- Juna (short, 1994)
- Häjyt (1999)
- Juoksuhaudantie (2004)
- Käsky (2008)
- Hyvä poika (2011)
- 8-pallo (2013)
- The Unknown Soldier (2017)
- Omerta 6/12 (2021)
- Kalevala: The Story of Kullervo (2026)
