= Dominic Raacke =

German actor and screenwriter (born 1958)

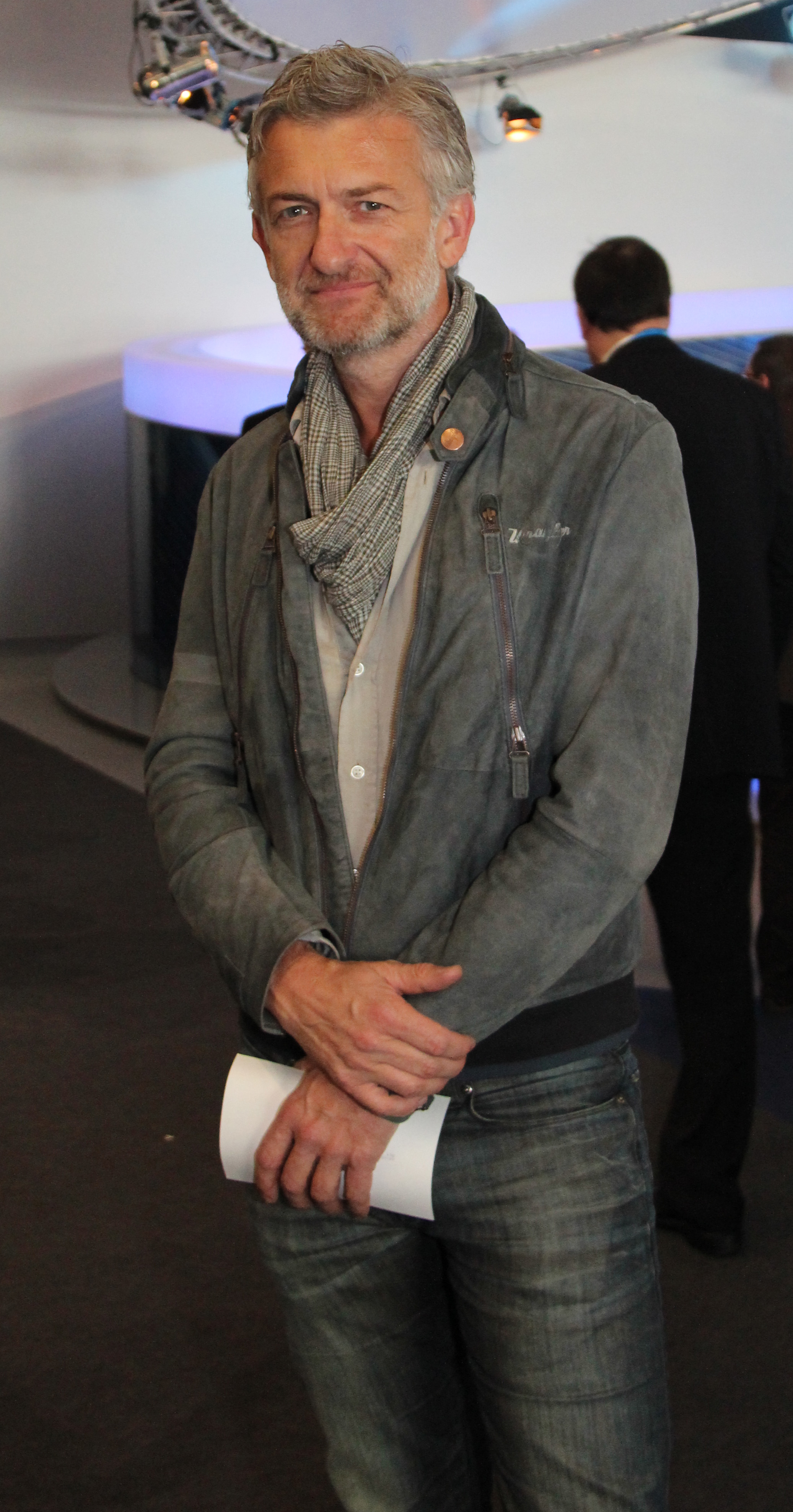
- Raacke in 2011
- Born: 11 December 1958 (age 67); Hanau, West Germany (now Germany)
- Occupation: Actor
- Years active: 1981–present

Dominic Raacke (born 11 December 1958) is a German actor and screenwriter. He is best known for his performance as Till Ritter in Tatort. He appeared in more than seventy films since 1981.

== Selected filmography ==
Year	Title	Role	Notes
1981	Cannibal Ferox	Tim Barret	
1983	Rote Erde	Karl Boetzkes	TV series
1985	Tango im Bauch	Lenzi	
1986	Bibos Männer	Professor	
1986	The Lenz Papers	Heilig	TV miniseries
1987	Gambit	Georg Dreibrodt	TV film
1988	The Curse	Father	
1989	With the Next Man Everything Will Be Different	Albert Auerbach	
1991	Babylon	Lothar	
1992	The First Circle	Nikolai Shagov	TV film
1992	The Parrot	Rainer Towa	
1995	Um die 30	Frank Schott	TV series
1996	The Tourist	Robert Lanz	TV film
1996	Deathline	Gregor	
1998	Assignment Berlin	Kommissar Eric Glint	TV film
1999	Men and Other Catastrophes	Leo Palewski	TV film
1999	Don't Look Behind You	Eric Loftin	TV film
2001	Love Trip	David Werner	TV film
2004	EuroTrip	Trucker	
2005	Der Todestunnel	Simon Roth	TV film
2006	Blackout – Die Erinnerung ist tödlich	Christoph Dermühl	TV miniseries
2007	The Unknown Guest	Maximilian Kemper	TV film
2007	Sweet Like Chocolate	Pit Opitz	TV film
2012	Passion	J.J. Koch	
2026	Lapland War	Generaloberst Lothar Rendulic	Film
