= Vilho Koskela =

Fictional human

Koskela as played by Jussi Vatanen in the 2017 film version

Vilho Johannes "Ville" Koskela is a fictional character in Väinö Linna's 1954 war novel The Unknown Soldier and the Under the North Star trilogy (1959–1962). In The Unknown Soldier, Koskela's military rank is initially that of a sergeant major, but he later rises to lieutenant. According to Väinö Linna, Vilho Koskela's role model was Nilsiä-born Einari Kokkonen. Another officer who provided material for Koskela's character was a lieutenant named Niemelä, who fell in the aftermath of the Battle of Pertjärvi, and whom Linna also valued as a leader.

== In the literature ==
=== The Unknown Soldier ===
Vilho Koskela is an almost 30-year-old sub-lieutenant when the Continuation War breaks out. The soldiers serving under him are more understanding of Koskela than of the other squad leader, Lieutenant Lammio (who later, as an active officer, will succeed Captain Kaarna as company commander). Koskela is quiet, calm and friendly, and therefore manages to gain the trust of his soldiers. Because of his reticence, he is nicknamed Ville Vaitelias ("Quiet Ville"). Koskela is quite modest and often more of a soldier than an officer. Koskela dies during the defensive battles of the summer of 1944; he is shot with a machine gun while destroying an enemy tank with a satchel charge, and his attempt to prevent the Finnish line from breaking apart is wasted.

=== Under the North Star ===
Koskela's background is revealed more in Under the North Star, and his first appearance occurs in the second volume of the trilogy. He was born in the Pentinkulma village of Tavastia in 1913, and he is the firstborn son of Akseli Koskela, a farmer and Red Guard officer, and Elina Kivivuori. Vilho's three uncles die in the 1918 Finnish Civil War, and two of his three younger brothers later fall in the Winter War.

At school, Vilho is a quiet and reserved student, a fairly easy student for the teacher. His main wish for school is for it to end soon. His teacher, Pentti Rautajärvi, is impressed by Vilho's gold medal in the parish boys' skiing competition. Even after finishing school, he is interested in sports, but knows on the other hand that his father will not let him "play sports on the Civil Guard's field".

Vilho is serving his military service in Hennala in the Tampere Regiment, where his father, a former Red Guard, was imprisoned there at the end of the Civil War. In the ranks, Vilho "learns everything easily", and he continues on to the NCO school. The assignment there is considered somewhat special because of his family's "Red connections": his father and uncles fought on the Red side in the Civil War, and Uncle Janne is a staunch Social Democrat. The primary reasons for the assignment to the NCO school are Vilho's success in cross-country skiing competitions and other "physical training" as well as his excellent marksmanship.

Pentikulma's pastor Lauri Salpakari, who often clashes with Vilho's father Aksel, respects Vilho: "He is an honest boy... You can see something of the best of this nation in him..." Salpakari believes that Vilho and his brothers have made amends for their father's "bad deeds" to the nation.

After the Winter War, Koskela is ordered to an officer's school, and he remains in the army as a sub-lieutenant on additional pay. On his first vacation in Pentinkulma during the Interim Peace in the spring of 1941, his old teacher made a first name basis trade with him: "Since we are fellow officers here. From now on, Pentti." While on his second vacation in the autumn of 1942, Vilho, in a discussion with his father, made pessimistic assessments of the outcome of the war and considered Germany's defeat possible – long before the Battle of Stalingrad.

== Performers ==
Koskela as played by Kosti Klemelä in the 1955 version

In the 1955 The Unknown Soldier film, directed by Edvin Laine, Koskela was played by Kosti Klemelä. In the 1970 film Akseli and Elina, based on the third volume of the trilogy, he was played by Ismo Vehkakoski. In the second The Unknown Soldier version from 1985, directed by Rauni Mollberg, Koskela was played by Risto Tuorila. In the 2009 Under the North Star II, directed by Timo Koivusalo, Koskela was played by Sampo Sarkola. In the third The Unknown Soldier version from 2017, directed by Aku Louhimies, Koskela was played by Jussi Vatanen.
