= Heikki Savolainen (actor) =

Finnish actor (1922–1975)

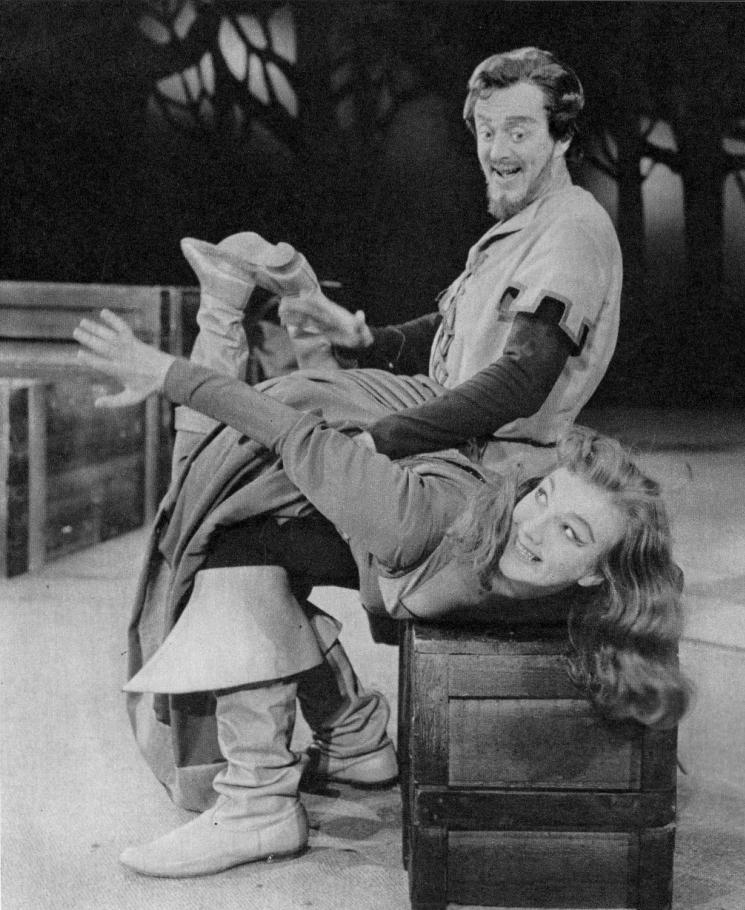
- Heikki Savolainen (above) in a 1963 Finnish National Theatre production of The Taming of the Shrew
- Born: 9 April 1922
- Died: 22 January 1975 (aged 52)
- Occupation: Movie actor
- Years active: 1949 - 1971

Heikki Savolainen (9 April 1922 in Pori – 22 January 1975) was a Finnish stage and screen actor renowned for the part of Urho Hietanen in Edvin Laine's 1955 The Unknown Soldier. He also played several comedic roles in 50's Finnish movies, as well as performing in several radio plays.

== Selected filmography ==
- The Unknown Soldier (1955)
- The Harvest Month (1956)
- Tweet, Tweet (1956)
- Little Presents (1961)
