= Risto Tuorila =

Finnish actor (born 1947)

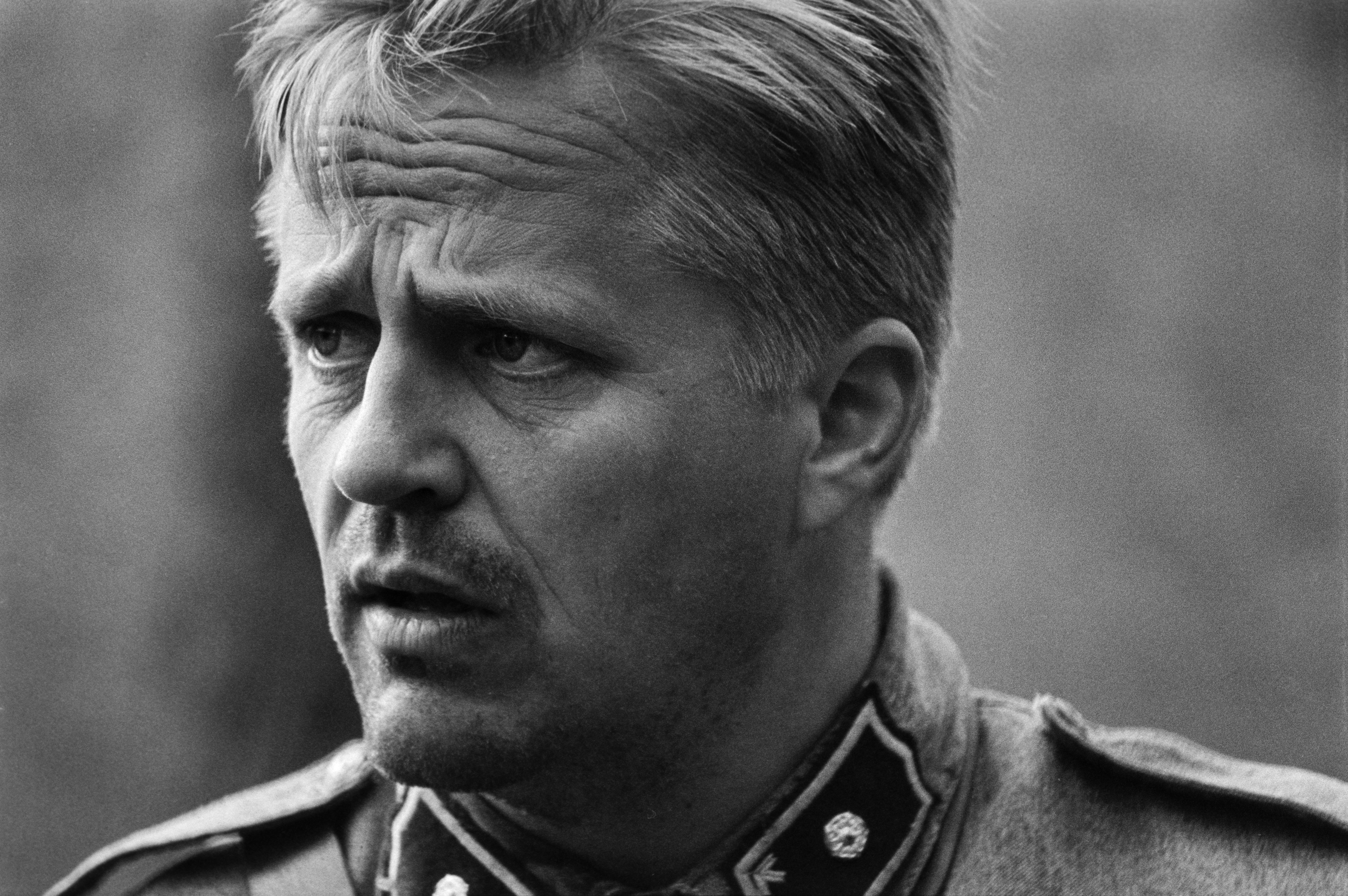
Tuorila in 1984, during the principal cinematography of the film The Unknown Soldier in Niinisalo.

Risto Kalevi Tuorila (born 19 February 1947) is a Finnish actor. Born in Oulu, he worked for a long time at the Oulu City Theatre before retiring in 2010.

His most famous film role was Vilho Koskela in the 1985 film The Unknown Soldier, directed by Rauni Mollberg, for which he won the Jussi Award for Best Actor. He was also awarded the City of Oulu Cultural Recognition Award in 2004, based on his long-term and distinguished work at the Oulu City Theatre.

Risto Tuorila is married to Maija Vahteri, a stage designer at Oulu City Theatre. He enjoys sailing in his free time.

== Partial filmography ==
- The Unknown Soldier (1985)
- Homebound (1989)
- Tommy and the Wildcat (1998)
- Gold Fever in Lapland (1999)
- Bad Boys (2003)
- Bordertown (2016)
