= The Unknown Soldier (1955 film) =

1955 film by Edvin Laine

- DVD cover of the region free release.
- Finnish: Tuntematon sotilas
- Directed by: Edvin Laine
- Written by: Juha Nevalainen; Väinö Linna
- Based on: The Unknown Soldier by Väinö Linna
- Produced by: T. J. Särkkä
- Starring: Kosti Klemelä; Heikki Savolainen; Reino Tolvanen
- Cinematography: Osmo Harkimo; Pentti Unho
- Edited by: Osmo Harkimo; Armas Vallasvuo
- Music by: Ahti Sonninen
- Distributed by: Suomen Filmiteollisuus
- Release date: 23 December 1955
- Running time: 177 minutes
- Country: Finland
- Language: Finnish
- Budget: FIM 46 million
- Box office: FIM 200 million

The Unknown Soldier (Finnish: Tuntematon sotilas, Swedish: Okänd soldat) is a Finnish war film directed by Edvin Laine that premiered in December 1955. It is based on The Unknown Soldier, a novel by Väinö Linna. The story is about the Continuation War between Finland and the Soviet Union as told from the viewpoint of ordinary Finnish soldiers.

The film was and remains the most successful movie ever in Finland; about 2.8 million people, or more than half the Finnish population, saw it in theaters, and in 1956, the film won five Jussi Awards, including the award for best director. Its portrayal of Linna's characters is widely accepted as canonical. The film was voted the best Finnish movie by 1,213 respondents in an Internet poll by Finnish newspaper Helsingin Sanomat in 2007.

The novel would be filmed again in 1985 by Rauni Mollberg and again in 2017 by Aku Louhimies.

== Synopsis ==
Set against the events of the Finnish Continuation War, the film follows a machine gun troop's journey into the Soviet Union. The troop includes the simple-minded Hietanen, the jokey Vanhala, the cynical Lahtinen, the cowardly Riitaoja and grumpy Lehto. The film also follows the commanding officers, such as the happy and slightly senile Captain Kaarna, the young and idealistic 2nd Lieutenant Kariluoto, the calm and modest 2nd Lieutenant Koskela and the strict and unsympathetic Lieutenant Lammio.

They face many struggles, such as seeing the supportive Kaarna die in their first battle, three of the soldiers refusing to leave their punishment post during an air-raid as well as defending the trenches after the Finns have taken back parts of Karelia. Part of the way, the troop is joined by Rokka, a Karelian veteran of the Winter War, who also clashes with Lammio due to having little respect for military discipline despite being an excellent and capable soldier.

Throughout the film, several of the main characters die. Lehto is injured during night-patrol, left behind and shoots himself. Riitaoja dies the same night when he runs off frightened and gets lost in the woods. Lahtinen dies during the winter, defending his position as his fellow soldiers flee. Hietanen is blinded by shrapnel in an artillery attack when he saves a young serviceman from being shot. His military ambulance crashes and the blinded Hietanen is gunned down by passing Russian planes while trying to save the other injured soldiers. Kariluoto dies while leading a counter-attack, and shortly afterwards Koskela gets shot while destroying a tank using a satchel charge.

== Cast ==
Reino Tolvanen as Cpl. Rokka

- Kosti Klemelä as Lt. Koskela
- Heikki Savolainen as Sgt. Hietanen
- Reino Tolvanen as Cpl. Rokka
- Veikko Sinisalo as Cpl. Lahtinen
- Åke Lindman as Cpl. Lehto
- Pentti Siimes as PFC. Määttä
- Leo Riuttu as Pvt. Vanhala
- Kaarlo Halttunen as Pvt. Rahikainen
- Matti Ranin as Cpt. Kariluoto
- Jussi Jurkka as Lt. Lammio
- Tauno Palo as Maj. Sarastie
- Pentti Irjala as Cpt. Kaarna
- Vilho Siivola as Supply Cpl. Mäkilä
- Olavi Ahonen as Pvt. Riitaoja
- Tarmo Manni as Pvt. Honkajoki
- Veli-Matti Kaitala as Pvt. Hauhia
- Tapio Hämäläinen as Pvt. Salo
- Martti Romppanen as Pvt. Sihvonen
- Vili Auvinen as Pvt. Asumaniemi
- Veikko Uusimäki as Cpt. Baranov
- Helena Vinkkaas Vera
- Anja Hatakka as Nina

== Production ==
The film began production and was released only a year after the release of the novel. There had been immediate competition for film rights, which were won by SF Film, led by T. J. Särkkä; Linna received one million Finnish marks in the deal. Filming began in April 1955 in Nurmijärvi, although the final script was not finished until the end of May.

The film is relatively loyal to the original novel, though the Soviets are rarely shown in most of the scenes. Kariluoto's death is different from the novel, though his last words are the same. Lammio's come-uppance from a disrespectful soldier during the Finns' retreat is absent from the film. The character Karjula has been omitted entirely. The role of Rahikainen has also been downplayed considerably; in the novel he is Hietanen's closest friend but merely a supporting character in the film.

Due to disagreements with SF Film, the Finnish Defense Forces refused to assist with the filming. Thus all soldiers are actors and there is a heavy use of stock footage in several scenes where Finnish artillery is shown.

As the soldiers are played by SF Film regulars, most are physically much older than their characters in the novel. Several actors were considered for the role of Rokka but were ultimately rejected because they couldn't deliver his Karelian Finnish dialect. Reino Tolvanen was an actual veteran of the Continuation War, having served in the air force, and was cast due to speaking the dialect naturally.

Edvin Laine and Väinö Linna became good friends during the production. Laine would go on to make several more films based on Linna's novels after the mid-1960s, when SF Film had gone bankrupt.

Upon completion, The Unknown Soldier was the longest and most expensive film in the Finnish cinema history up to that point: 181 minutes and, according to the account book, FIM 46,667,761.

At the beginning and the end of the film Finlandia, by Finnish national composer Jean Sibelius, is played. The music used in the film is a mixture of original music composed by Ahti Sonninen and stock music.

== Release ==
The Unknown Soldier was presented as an invited guest performance at the Bio Rex theatre in Helsinki on Monday, 19 December 1955, for Väinö Linna's wartime unit, Infantry Regiment 8, as well as the film's actors and production staff. Among the invited guests was Sergeant Viljam Pylkäs, who was Antero Rokka's role model. In addition, representatives of the Finnish military leadership and government were present. The performance was given for the benefit of war invalids. A second invited guest performance was on 22 December, when those involved in the making of the film and members of the Finnish Government were invited. The actual national theatrical premiere was on Friday, 23 December 1955, in Helsinki, Tampere, Turku, Oulu, Lahti and Pori, as well as in Riihimäki.

== Legacy ==
Since 2000, Yle has broadcast the film every year on the Independence Day of Finland (6 December). In 2015, it was moved to Yle Teema, away from its usual slot on either Yle TV1 or Yle TV2.

In 1985, with Väinö Linna's approval, Rauni Mollberg directed a new adaptation in color. This film follows the novel more closely but also features obvious visual nods to the 1955 version.

The latest adaptation, directed by Aku Louhimies, came out in 2017. The film made its television premiere on the Independence Day of Finland (6 December) in 2021.

== See also ==
- The Unknown Soldier (novel)
- The Unknown Soldier and Finnish Cinematographic Art commemorative €10 coin
- Talvisota (film)
- Winter War
