= List of most expensive Finnish films =

This is a non-definitive TOP 50 list of most expensive Finnish films.

No.	Film name	Year of release	Budget	Value in 2008 euros
1	The Angry Birds Movie	2016	73,000,000 USD	60,086,758 €
2	The Angry Birds Movie 2	2019	65,000,000 USD	50,226,797 €
3	Iron Sky: The Coming Race	2019	20,000,000 €	17,759,759 €
4	Niko: Beyond the Northern Lights	2024	7,200,000 €	10,194,243 €
5	Sisu: Road to Revenge	2025	11,000,000 €	7,742,988 €
6	Big Game	2014	8,500,000 €	7,615,150 €
7	Attack on Finland	2021	8,148,808 €	6,988,483 €
8	Iron Sky	2012	7,500,000 €	6,924,000 €
9	Little Brother, Big Trouble: A Christmas Adventure	2012	7,300,000 €	6,779,386 €
10	The Unknown Soldier (2017)	2017	7,000,000 €	6,500,781 €
11	The Flight Before Christmas	2008	6,113,000 €	6,113,000 €
12	Never Alone	2025	4,112,000 €	5,966,289 €
13	Quest for a Heart	2007	5,514,484 €	5,738,372 €
14	The Magic Crystal	2007	5,074,000 €	5,279,891 €
15	Sisu	2022	6,000,000 €	4,803,547 €
16	Born American	1986	16,700,000 mk	4,786,220 €
17	The Winter War	1989	19,000,000 mk	4,698,700 €
18	Dark Floors	2006	4,200,000 €	4,480,094 €
19	Friends, Comrades	1990	18,487,466 mk	4,309,428 €
20	The Unknown Soldier (1985)	1985	14,221,237 mk	4,222,285 €
21	Beyond the Front Line	2004	3,493,000 €	3,824,136 €
22	Amazon	1990	15,358,089 mk	3,579,971 €
23	Here, Beneath the North Star	1968	2,579,027 €	3,541,778 €
24	The Summer Book	2024	4,700,000 €	3,486,778 €
25	Gold Fever in Lapland	1999	16,746,000 mk	3,355,898 €
26	1944: The Final Defence	2007	3,200,000 €	3,329,920 €
27	Moomins on the Riviera	2014	3,600,000 €	3,260,613 €
28	The Well	1992	14,511,774 mk	3,166,469 €
29	Hatching	2022	3,950,000 €	3,162,335 €
30	Tove	2020	3,400,000 €	2,979,886 €
31	The Eternal Road	2017	3,300,000 €	2,962,056 €
32	Promise	2005	2,700,000 €	2,930,850 €
33	Colorado Avenue	2007	2,800,000 €	2,913,680 €
34	Going to Kansas City	1998	14,278,968 mk	2,894,347 €
35	Jade Warrior	2006	2,700,000 €	2,880,090 €
36	Akseli and Elina	1970	1,857,900 mk	2,831,622 €
37	Stormskerry Maja	2024	3,800,000 €	2,819,097 €
38	Helsinki Napoli All Night Long	1987	10,000,000 mk	2,765,000 €
39	Memory of Water	2022	3,400,000 €	2,722,010 €
40	The Minister of State	1997	13,200,000 mk	2,713,920 €
41	Flame Top	1980	5,987,763 mk	2,676,530 €
42	Tommy and the Wildcat	1998	13,103,151 mk	2,656,009 €
43	Rollo and the Spirit of the Woods	2001	12,000,000 mk	2,644,535 €
44	Christmas Story	2007	2,500,000 €	2,601,500 €
45	Ambush	1999	12,614,904 mk	2,528,027 €
46	Mother of Mine	2005	2,317,000 €	2,515,104 €
47	The New Man	2007	2,287,772 €	2,515,104 €
48	Vares: Private Eye	2004	1,800,000 €	2,302,188 €
49	Rare Exports: A Christmas Tale	2010	1,948,000 €	2,243,868 €
50	Da Capo	1985	6,462,442 mk	2,237,364 €

== Sources ==
- http://www.hs.fi/grafiikka/1135249487083
- http://www.hs.fi/kulttuuri/artikkeli/Nykyanimaatiot+kirkkaasti+Suomen+elokuvahistorian+kalleimpia/1135249488275
- http://fin.afterdawn.com/uutiset/arkisto/19514.cfm

== See also ==
- List of most expensive non-English language films
