= The Unknown Soldier (1985 film) =

1985 film by Rauni Mollberg

- A DVD cover for The Unknown Soldier
- Finnish: Tuntematon sotilas
- Directed by: Rauni Mollberg
- Written by: Veikko Aaltonen; Väinö Linna
- Produced by: Rauni Mollberg
- Starring: Risto Tuorila; Pirkka-Pekka Petelius; Paavo Liski; Mika Mäkelä; Pertti Koivula; Tero Niva; Ossi-Ensio Korvuo; Mikko Niskanen; Pauli Poranen
- Distributed by: Arctic-Filmi
- Release date: 1985
- Running time: Theatrical: 199 min TV version: 227 min
- Country: Finland
- Language: Finnish

The Unknown Soldier (Finnish: Tuntematon sotilas) is a Finnish film from 1985 directed by Rauni Mollberg. It is based on the 1954 best selling Finnish novel of the same name written by Väinö Linna. It is the second film adaptation of Linna's novel, the first one being the 1955 film of the same title, directed by Edvin Laine. The third film adaptation of the same novel was released in 2017, directed by Aku Louhimies.

It was screened in the Un Certain Regard section at the 1986 Cannes Film Festival. The film was selected as the Finnish entry for the Best Foreign Language Film at the 59th Academy Awards, but was not accepted as a nominee. The film received three Jussi Awards: Mollberg for directing and actors Risto Tuorila as Koskela and Paavo Liski as Rokka.

== Synopsis ==
Set against the events of the Finnish Continuation War, the film follows a machine gun troop's journey into the Soviet Union. The troop includes the simple-minded Hietanen, the jokey Vanhala, the cynical Lahtinen, the cowardly Riitaoja and grumpy Lehto. The film also follows the command officers, such as the happy and slightly senile Captain Kaarna, the young and idealistic Captain Kariluoto and the strict and unsympathetic Lieutenant Lammio. They face many struggles, such as seeing the supportive Kaarna die in their first battle and three of the soldiers refusing to leave their punishment post during an air-raid, as well as defending the trenches after the Finns have taken back parts of Karelia. Partway through their journey, the troop is joined by Rokka, a Karelian veteran of the Winter War, who also clashes with Lammio due to having little respect for military discipline, despite being an excellent and capable soldier.

== Cast ==
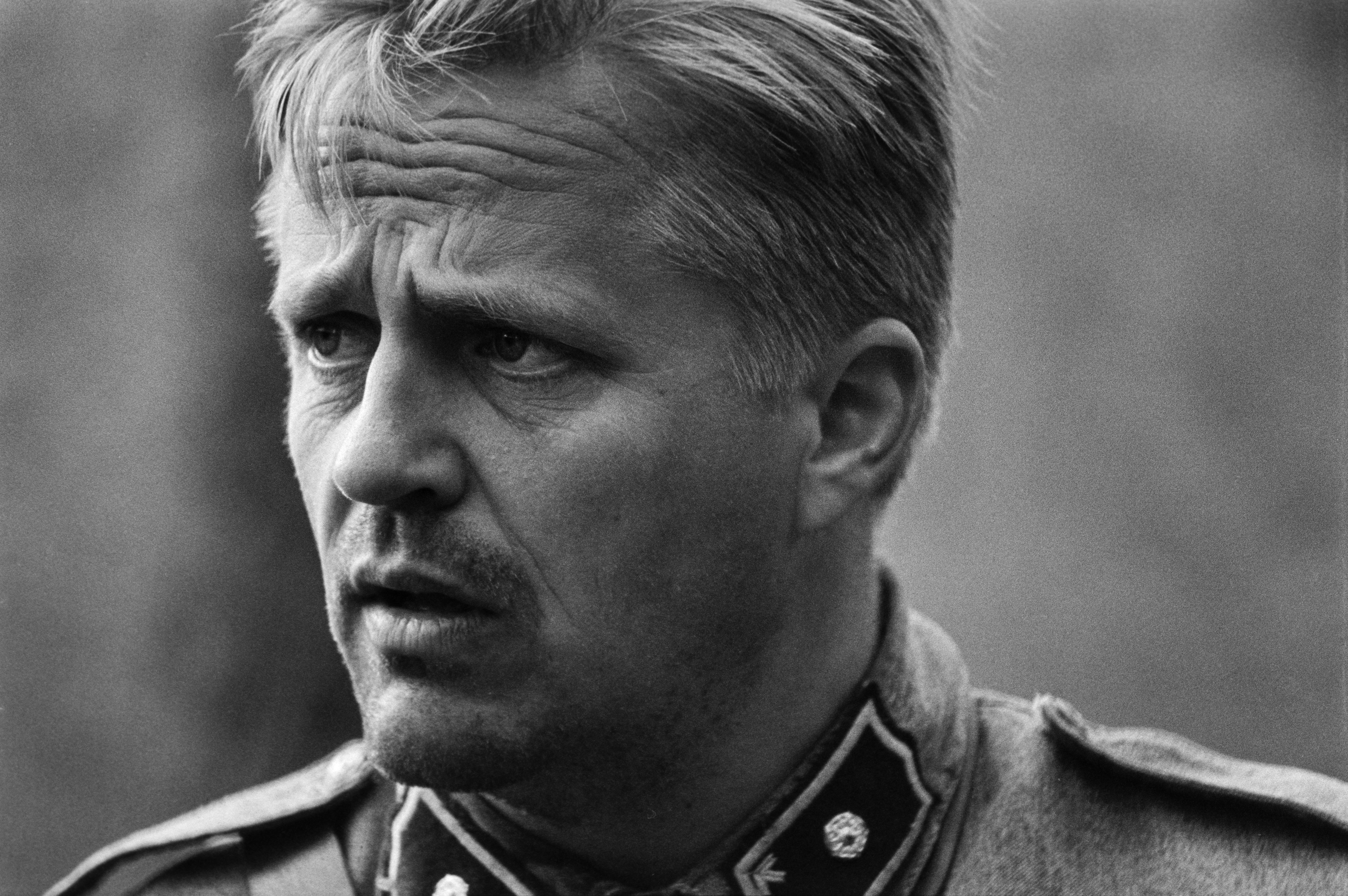
Risto Tuorila in 1984, during the principal cinematography of the film in Niinisalo

- Risto Tuorila – Koskela
- Pirkka-Pekka Petelius – Hietanen
- Paavo Liski – Rokka
- Mika Mäkelä – Rahikainen
- Pertti Koivula – Lahtinen
- Tero Niva – Vanhala
- Ossi-Ensio Korvuo – Määttä
- Mikko Niskanen – Salo
- Pauli Poranen – Lehto
- Hannu Kivioja – Riitaoja
- Juha Riihimäki – Sihvonen
- Seppo Juusonen – Susi
- Timo Virkki – Honkajoki
- Vesa Ala-Seppälä – Hauhia
- Risto Hetta – Vuorela
- Veli-Matti Pernu – Kaukonen
- Kari Väänänen – Lammio
- Pekka Ketonen – Kariluoto

== Production ==
Mollberg used young and unknown actors, many of whom are now famous. The film was shot in color with much hand-held footage, attempting to portray the story more realistically than the prior Edvin Laine version. This has often led to unfavorable comparisons with the better-known 1955 adaption. Although a full musical score was composed for the movie, Mollberg released the finished film without it for stylistic reasons.

Making the 1985 version cost more than 20 times as much as the 1955 film: the production costs of Edvin Laine's film were approximately FIM 650,000 in 1985 currency, while Rauni Mollberg's film was over FIM 14 million, making it the most expensive Finnish film of all time when it was completed.

== See also ==
- List of submissions to the 59th Academy Awards for Best Foreign Language Film
- List of Finnish submissions for the Academy Award for Best Foreign Language Film
