= The Unknown Soldier (novel) =

1954 war novel by Väinö Linna

- First edition
- Author: Väinö Linna
- Original title: Tuntematon sotilas
- Translator: Liesl Yamaguchi (2015)
- Cover artist: Martti Mykkänen
- Language: Finnish
- Genre: War novel
- Published: 1954 (WSOY)
- Publication date: 3 December 1954; 71 years ago
- Publication place: Finland
- English publication date: 1957 (Collins, UK); 1957 (Putnam's, US); 2015 (Penguin Books) as Unknown Soldiers
- Media type: Print (Hardback & Paperback)
- Pages: 384 pp (1957); 476 pp (2015)
- ISBN: 9789510430866
- OCLC: 37585178

The Unknown Soldier (Finnish: Tuntematon sotilas, Swedish: Okänd soldat) or Unknown Soldiers is a war novel by Finnish author Väinö Linna, considered his magnum opus. Published in 1954, The Unknown Soldier chronicles the 1941–1944 Continuation War between Finland and the Soviet Union from the viewpoint of ordinary Finnish soldiers.

In 2000, the manuscript version of the novel was published with the title Sotaromaani ("the war novel") and in 2015, the latest English translation as Unknown Soldiers. A fictional account based closely on Linna's own experiences during the war, the novel presented a more realistic outlook on the formerly romanticized image of a noble and obedient Finnish soldier. Linna gave his characters independent and critical thoughts, and presented them with human feelings, such as fear and rebellion.

Although published to mixed reviews, The Unknown Soldier quickly became one of the best-selling books in Finland and is considered both a classic in Finnish literature and a part of the national legacy. The novel was well received by frontline veterans; it shot Linna to literary fame and has been described as creating a shift in the collective memory of the war. It has sold nearly 800,000 copies, been translated into 20 different languages and adapted into three films with the latest one released in 2017.

== Setting and characters ==
The novel follows soldiers of a Finnish Army machine gun company operating on the Karelian front during the Continuation War from mobilisation in 1941 to the Moscow Armistice in 1944. The company's action is based on Infantry Regiment 8 (Finnish: Jalkaväkirykmentti 8), the actual unit Väinö Linna served in. The novel has no single central character and both begins and ends with an ironic play on the narrator's omniscience. Rather, its focus is on different responses and views on the experience of war from a soldier's point of view.

The men of the company come from all over Finland, they have widely varying social backgrounds and political attitudes, and everyone has their own way of coping with the war. The novel paints realistic, yet sympathetic, portraits of a score of very different men: cowards and heroes—the initially naive and eventually brave upper-class idealist Jorma Kariluoto; the down-to-earth Vilho Koskela; the hardened and cynical working-class grunt Lehto; the company comedian Vanhala; the pragmatic and strong-nerved Antero "Antti" Rokka; the politically indifferent Urho Hietanen, and the communist Lahtinen. Most of the characters are killed in action during the course of the novel. Nevertheless, the general atmosphere of the machine gun company is relaxed and business-like, even childish and jolly, throughout the story, despite the war, losses, death and despair. The soldiers' continued disrespect for formalities and discipline is a source of frustration for some of the officers.

== Plot ==
'Koskela the Finn. Eats iron and shits chains.' [Koskela introducing himself while intoxicated.]

— Väinö Linna, Unknown Soldiers, p. 298, translated by Liesl Yamaguchi in 2015.

The novel starts with the company transferring in June 1941 from their barracks to the Finnish-Soviet border in preparation for the invasion of the Soviet Union. Soon after, the soldiers receive their baptism by fire in an attack over a swamp on Soviet positions. Captain Kaarna is killed during the battle and the stern Lieutenant Lammio takes his place as company commander. Amidst a series of battles, the company assaults a Soviet bunker line on a ridge and stops an armoured attack, the ambushed and abandoned Lehto commits suicide during a regimental flanking maneuver, and the soldiers advance into East Karelia. The company eventually crosses the old border lost during the Winter War and the soldiers ponder the justification for the continued invasion. In October 1941, the company is stationed in the captured and pillaged Petrozavodsk, where the novel follows the soldiers interacting with the locals.

Two men are executed after refusing to follow orders to fend off a Soviet winter attack along the Svir river—during which Lahtinen is killed while trying to carry off his Maxim M/32-33 machine gun and Rokka distinguishes himself by ambushing a 50-strong enemy unit with a Suomi KP/-31 submachine gun. The story moves on to the trench warfare period of the war. The period includes the soldiers drinking kilju (a home-made sugar wine) during Commander-in-Chief Field Marshal Carl Gustaf Emil Mannerheim's birthday celebrations and getting drunk, a new recruit being killed by a sniper for failing to listen to advice from experienced veterans and raising his head above the trench, and Rokka capturing an enemy captain during a nightly Soviet probe into the Finnish trenches.

The final act of the novel describes the defence against the Soviet Vyborg–Petrozavodsk offensive of summer 1944, the withdrawal and counter-attacks of the Finnish Army, and the numerous losses that the company suffers. The company abandons their machine guns in a lake while withdrawing from a hopeless defence, and Lieutenant Colonel Karjula executes the retreating Private Viirilä in a burst of rage while trying to force his men into positions. Koskela is killed while disabling an attacking Soviet tank with a satchel charge and Hietanen is blinded in an artillery strike, while saving a young serviceman from being shot, and later dies when the ambulance evacuating him is attacked. Asumaniemi, an ambitious young private, is the last one to die during the company's last counter-attack. The war ends in a ceasefire in September 1944, with the soldiers rising from their foxholes after the final Soviet artillery barrage stops. The survivors listen to the first radio announcements of the eventual Moscow Armistice. The novel's last sentence describes the characters of the unit as "[r]ather dear, those boys."

== Themes ==
Jorma Kariluoto had paid his dues into the common pot of human idiocy. [The narrator after Kariluoto's death.]

— Väinö Linna, Unknown Soldiers, p. 412, translated by Liesl Yamaguchi in 2015.

Väinö Linna wrote in his manuscript cover letter to the publisher WSOY that he wanted "to give the soldiers, who bore the weight of the calamity, all the appreciation and strip war of its glory". Gritty and realistic, the novel was partly intended to shatter the myth of a noble, obedient Finnish soldier. In Linna's own words, he wanted to give the Finnish soldier a brain, an organ he saw lacking in earlier depictions—such as Johan Runeberg's The Tales of Ensign Stål, where Finnish soldiers are admiringly portrayed with big hearts and little independent intellect. The Unknown Soldier is closely based on Linna's own experiences as a Finnish Army soldier in Infantry Regiment 8 during the Continuation War with many of its scenes derived from factual events, but is more or less fictional.

The novel has been described as an honest, uncomforting, forlorn, pacifist and critical outlook on the war between the Soviet Union and Finland. The Herald described Linna's aim as "not to home in on individual plights and agendas but to show the whole great shapeless mass of a platoon, one that is continuously besieged and pared down". The Independent stated that Linna examines nationhood and "the fate of small nations in particular" while the novel's "wisest characters come to regard nationality as a matter of chance". Aku Louhimies, director of the 2017 film adaptation, analysed Linna's intentions as follows: "I think [his] original idea was to show the events so that they would also act as a warning."

== Reception and legacy ==
The novel initially received mixed reviews and was not expected to be a commercial success by its publishers, but has since become a revered household classic that Finns are given to read at school. By 2017, it had sold nearly 800,000 units. It launched Väinö Linna into a steady career as a public figure and The Unknown Soldier was adapted into different formats for theatre, cinema and radio. Released ten years after the end of the Continuation War, the novel is considered to be the first medium that gave a realistic description of the conflict instead of a polished one. Although the book was criticized, for example, by senior officers of the Finnish Defence Forces as an erroneous account of the war, the book was well received by the masses and frontline veterans who thought it depicted their experiences accurately.

The Unknown Soldier and its first film adaptation of 1955 created a shift in the cultural memory of the war. Likewise, the novel is widely believed to have a special cultural status whereby only a limited number of ways to adapt the canon text are considered acceptable. The cover art of a soldier's white silhouette against a red background, designed by Martti Mykkänen, became similarly famous and is often used as a symbol for war in Finland. The novel contributed numerous expressions and idioms into Finnish culture and language, with phrases that are popular to the point of some having become clichès. Few remember the exact characterisations from the book, but some phrases are known word for word. Some of the characters even became role models. For example, the disobedient but competent and pragmatic Rokka, or the humane jokester, Hietanen, are described as typical role models, while the calm, fair and composed Koskela is the paragon of every Finnish leader. In conclusion, the novel is considered to be a defining part of the national legacy and identity of Finland. As such, the 1955 film adaptation by Edvin Laine is broadcast on national television every Independence Day and seen by nearly 20% of the Finnish population.

== Editions ==
The first United Kingdom edition of The Unknown Soldier by Collins in 1957

By 2017, the book had been printed in 60 editions in Finland. Its first English translations were published in 1957 by William Collins, Sons and G. P. Putnam's Sons in the United Kingdom and the United States, respectively. It has since been translated into 20 other languages. An unedited manuscript version was published in 2000 by WSOY as Sotaromaani ("the war novel")—Linna's working title for The Unknown Soldier. Penguin Books published a new English translation by Liesl Yamaguchi in 2015 with the idiosyncratic title Unknown Soldiers to reflect the lives of young Finnish soldiers in the war.

== Adaptations ==
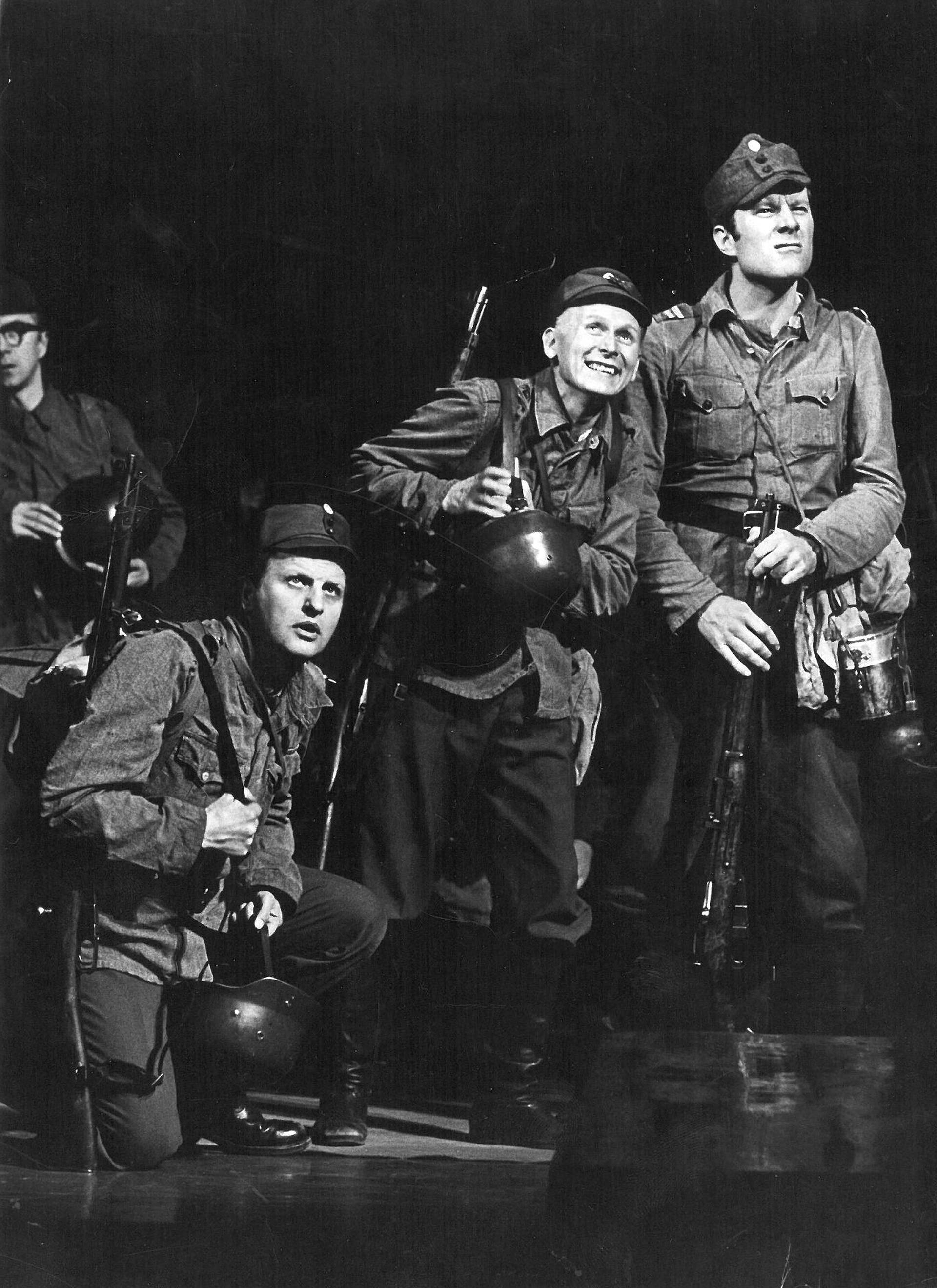
The opera adaptation premiered in 1967

- The Unknown Soldier (1955) – a film directed by Edvin Laine
- Tuntematon sotilas (1966–1967) – Yle's radio drama
- Tuntematon sotilas (1967) – an opera composed by Tauno Pylkkänen
- The Unknown Soldier (1985) – a film directed by Rauni Mollberg
- Tuntematon sotilas (2009) – TV movie of a stage play based on the book
- The Unknown Soldier (2017) – a film directed by Aku Louhimies

== See also ==
- Finnish literature
- List of books with anti-war themes
- List of Finnish writers
- Military history of Finland during World War II
- Under the North Star trilogy
- The Winter War (novel)
