= The Unknown Soldier (2017 film) =

2017 film by Aku Louhimies

Unknown Soldier
- Theatrical release poster
- Finnish: Tuntematon sotilas
- Directed by: Aku Louhimies
- Screenplay by: Aku Louhimies; Jari Olavi Rantala
- Based on: The Unknown Soldier by Väinö Linna
- Produced by: Aku Louhimies; Mikko Tenhunen; Kimmo Nieminen; Miia Haavisto
- Starring: Eero Aho; Johannes Holopainen; Jussi Vatanen; Aku Hirviniemi; Hannes Suominen; Paula Vesala; Samuli Vauramo; Joonas Saartamo; Arttu Kapulainen; Andrei Alén; Juho Milonoff; Matti Ristinen; Diana Pozharskaya
- Cinematography: Mika Orasmaa
- Edited by: Benjamin Mercer
- Music by: Lasse Enersen
- Production companies: Elokuvaosakeyhtiö Suomi 2017; Kvikmyndafélag Íslands; Scope Pictures
- Distributed by: SF Studios (Nordic); Beta Cinema (International)
- Release date: 27 October 2017
- Running time: 180 minutes (Finnish theatrical cut); 133 minutes (international theatrical cut); 283 minutes (Finnish TV series)
- Country: Finland
- Language: Finnish
- Budget: €7 million
- Box office: €13.5 million

The Unknown Soldier (Finnish: Tuntematon sotilas, Swedish: Okänd soldat) is a 2017 Finnish independent war drama film, an adaptation of the bestselling 1954 Finnish classic novel of the same name by Väinö Linna, literature considered part of the national legacy. Directed by Aku Louhimies, it is the first one based on the novel's manuscript version, Sotaromaani ("the war novel"). Previously adapted in 1955 and 1985, the World War II film is presented from the point of view of a machine gun company (Finnish: konekiväärikomppania) of the Finnish Army during the Continuation War between Finland and the Soviet Union from 1941 to 1944. It was the most expensive Finnish motion picture at its release, with a budget of €7 million.

The film opened to mixed reviews domestically on 27 October 2017, part of the official 100th anniversary of Finnish independence program, breaking the opening weekend record for a local-language film. The international premier was on 23 November 2017 at the Tallinn Black Nights Film Festival, followed by premiers in Ireland, Sweden, Iceland and Norway. The film was described by critics as gritty, forlorn, honest and realistic as well as a pacifist piece confronting less pleasant sides of Finnish history. The film won four Jussi Awards for Best Actor (Aho), along with Best Editing, Best Makeup and Hairstyling, and Best Sound Editing, from a total of eleven nominations. With a €13.5 million domestic gross at the 2017 box office, it was the most successful film of the year in Finnish cinema.

== Synopsis ==
=== Setting and characters ===
The film's setting is based on the unit Väinö Linna served in during the Continuation War, Infantry Regiment 8 (Finnish: Jalkaväkirykmentti 8). It follows a fictional Finnish Army machine gun company on the Karelian front from mobilisation in 1941 to armistice in 1944. The soldiers of the company are sympathetic but realistic portraits of men from all over Finland with widely varying backgrounds. Their attitude is relaxed, disrespectful of formalities, and business-like, even childish and jolly, throughout the story despite the war and the losses the company suffers. The film occasionally shifts to the home front, showing for example the company's commander Kariluoto marrying his fiancée at Helsinki Cathedral in the midst of war and corporal Antero Rokka visiting his wife Lyyti and children at their farm on the Karelian Isthmus.

=== Plot ===
In June 1941, a Finnish machine gun company deploys from their barracks to a staging area in preparation for their participation in the invasion of the Soviet Union. The company's first mission is an attack through a swamp against Soviet positions. The company participates in a series of battles during the advance into East Karelia. In October 1941, the men of the company interact with locals in city of Petroskoi (Petrozavodsk), liberated from the Red Army which has pillaged it. During the winter, the company is ordered to defend against a Soviet attack along the Svir river. Lahtinen is killed during a Soviet breakthrough, but Rokka ambushes a fifty man unit attempting a flanking maneuver against them. The company becomes mired in trench warfare in 1942 and 1943. The soldiers pass time getting drunk on kilju (a home-made sugar wine), celebrate Commander-in-Chief Field Marshal C. G. E. Mannerheim's birthday, a new recruit is killed by a sniper and replacements reinforce the company.

The Soviet Vyborg–Petrozavodsk offensive of summer 1944 forces the Finnish Army to withdraw from areas they've taken from the Soviets, and to stall their advance with counter-attacks. Hietanen is wounded by artillery and dies when his ambulance is attacked. The company suffers many casualties, including Captain Kariluoto, and abandons its machine guns during a retreat from a hopeless defensive position. The company firms up on another line with orders to fight off another Soviet attack. Koskela is killed while disabling a Soviet tank with a satchel charge. Finland signs a ceasefire with the Soviet Union in September 1944. The soldiers rise from their defensive fighting positions after a final Soviet artillery barrage and listen to radio announcements regarding the Moscow Armistice. The film closes with a montage of the impacts of the war and actual war-time footage.

== Cast ==
Eero Aho as Antero "Antti" Rokka

Jussi Vatanen as Vilho Koskela

- Eero Aho as Antero Rokka, a pragmatic veteran corporal of the Winter War and originally a farmer from the Karelian Isthmus, who came to the war "to kill and not to be killed" and does not believe in military discipline. According to the newspaper Helsingin Sanomat, Aho's casting came as a surprise considering he had mostly played villains or tormented characters in the past.
- Johannes Holopainen as Jorma Kariluoto, an idealistic 2nd lieutenant, later lieutenant and captain. He is a romantic that believes death in combat is of the utmost honor.
- Jussi Vatanen as Vilho "Ville" Johannes Koskela, platoon leader as 2nd lieutenant and later lieutenant. Koskela is described as the archetypal Finnish role model: quiet, upstanding and modest.
- Aku Hirviniemi as corporal, later sergeant Urho Hietanen, the platoon jokester from Finland Proper.
- Severi Saarinen as Lehto, an aggressive and irritable corporal who hates weakness.
- Hannes Suominen as Vanhala, a Tavastian private, later lance corporal and corporal who does not take the war seriously and favours listening to gramophone records of Soviet songs, such as "Kalinka".
- Paula Vesala as Lyyti, Rokka's wife who stays behind at the Karelian Isthmus to take care of the farm and their children. The character did not appear in previous film adaptations, but has been regarded as a welcome balance to the focus on the frontline.
- Samuli Vauramo as Lammio, a disciplined platoon leader who is promoted to captain and company commander after the first battle. Lammio is portrayed as more humane than the caricatures of previous versions.
- Diana Pozharskaya as Vera, a Russian civilian during the Finnish occupation of Petroskoi (Petrozavodsk)
- Arttu Kapulainen as private Susi ("Suen Tassu"), Rokka's quiet neighbour and closest friend from the Karelian Isthmus who follows him everywhere.
- Andrei Alén as Rahikainen, an unempathetic private who takes advantage of the war environment.
- Eino Heiskanen as Riitaoja, a timid and fearful soldier who is mostly a burden to the platoon.
- Kimi Vilkkula as Sihvonen, a clumsy but an adept soldier of the platoon.
- Juho Milonoff as Aarne Honkajoki, a reservist private who reinforces the company.
- Eemeli Louhimies as Asumaniemi, a cocky and naive 19-year-old private who reinforces the company.
- Matti Ristinen as Sarastie, major and commander of the battalion.

== Production ==
=== Development ===
Development of The Unknown Soldier began in September 2014 when the Finnish Film Foundation granted 30,000 euros to Aku Louhimies' production company and his plan to base the film on the original novel's manuscript version Sotaromaani ("the war novel"), released in 2010. According to Louhimies, his vision for the film was to make a modern version of the classic, similar to new versions of Macbeth or Othello, and bring the original novel to "the audience of today" and within the reach of the younger generation—who hardly knew Väinö Linna's novel or the first film at the time. Louhimies compared the screenplay to Thin Red Line which both selectively feature storylines from the source material.

With a budget of 7 million euros, The Unknown Soldier became the most expensive film ever made in Finland or in the Finnish language. Producers pitched the film to investors with the script alone and funding for the film was fully secured in August 2015 with €5 million of the financing coming from private investors, such as video game company Supercell, banking group LähiTapiola and foundations. Additionally €1 million came from the Finnish Film Foundation and €1 million from the national broadcaster Yle. The film was produced by the Finnish Elokuvaosakeyhtiö Suomi 2017 with the Icelandic Kvikmyndafélag Íslands and Belgian Scope Pictures as co-producers. Reportedly, Rafale International, a defense aviation manufacturer whose Dassault Rafale fighter was one of the aircraft in consideration to replace the Finnish Air Force's fleet of F/A-18 Hornets, was the film's main partner.

=== Filming ===
Natural lighting was used in the film to enhance realism.

Filming commenced on 6 June 2016 and was shot in 80 days with over 3,000 extras and the support of the Finnish Defence Forces at locations around Finland, such as Suomenlinna fortress and North Karelia wilderness with most of the battle scenes done at Karelia Brigade training area. Initially, over 14,000 people volunteered as extras. On 29 June 2016, the film set a Guinness World Record when Duncan Capp of IFX International Special Effects detonated the most high explosives in a single film take, 70.54 kg of TNT equivalent. By day 72 of filming, 458 hours of footage had been captured with a production team of 120 people. Benjamin Mercer edited the film releases as well as the five-part television release with the Final Cut Pro X application.

The cast, of whom some had prior conscript military experience, went through boot camp training arranged by the auxiliary National Defence Training Association on wilderness skills, how to keep warm during winter and how to move with cross-country skis in a forest. Louhimies wanted "people to feel and understand how it is and feel to be at war". The cast slept at scene locations in stove-warmed military tents, mimicking an actual war-time unit. To imbue realism into the scenes, the film was shot without artificial lighting, using whatever conditions the crew had.

=== Music ===
The soundtrack of the film was composed by Lasse Enersen (with whom Louhimies had cooperated before) and recorded with the Lahti Symphony Orchestra at Sibelius Hall. Louhimies wanted the music to display "soul and fragility" while Enersen described it as "simple, stark, sometimes raw and ugly" and left out themes of heroism or victory from the score. Louhimies considered it important that the music was produced in Finland in alignment with the 100th year of Finnish independence. Enersen visited locations of the film during filming to talk with actors, find inspiration and to observe. He decided to use a synthesizer and a Hardanger fiddle, a traditional Norwegian instrument, to complement the orchestra's music. Caoimhín Ó Raghallaigh, an Irish fiddler, performed the Hardanger on the score. On 15 September 2017, the Finnish pop rock band Haloo Helsinki! released the song "Tuntematon" ("Unknown"), thematically tied to the film through its lyrics and music video. The music video was directed by Aku Louhimies and Aleksi Koskinen.

== Themes ==
I think Linna's original idea was to show the events so that they would also act as a warning. To be true to that idea, I am not keen on presenting heroes.

— Aku Louhimies, 10 January 2017

The film was described as honestly confronting the less pleasant aspects of Finnish history, such as the nature of the war as Finnish aggression, military cooperation with Nazi Germany, and Adolf Hitler's secret visit to celebrate Field Marshal Mannerheim's 75th birthday in June 1942. For example, military historian Lasse Laaksonen said that the film's positive aspect is that it allows Finns to learn about their history. Likewise, the film was described as a gritty, forlorn, pacifist and realistic outlook on the Continuation War. Director Louhimies commented that he intended to highlight the individuals taking part in war instead of glorifying conflict and stay true to Väinö Linna's views. Allusions were drawn from the film's patriotic nature to contemporary foreign policy of Russia, tensions in the Baltic region and Mannerheim's description of Russia as Finland's "hereditary enemy from the East". However, the film was described as using Russian actors, such as Diana Pozharskaya playing Vera in the conquered Petrozavodsk, to humanize the war.

== Release ==
The film's release was tied to the centenary of Finnish independence. It premiered in Finland on 27 October 2017 at 140 locations with an age rating of 16 and distributed by SF Studios. German independent film distributor Beta Cinema purchased the international sales rights for the movie. The Unknown Soldier was featured at the American Film Market in November 2017, and during the same month SF Studios acquired distribution rights for Sweden, Norway and Denmark and Arrow Films the rights for the United Kingdom and Ireland. The international premier of the film was at the Tallinn Black Nights Film Festival in Estonia on 23 November 2017. It opened at the Subtitle film festival in Ireland on 25 November 2017, in Sweden on 6 December 2017, in Iceland on 25 January 2018 and in Norway on 9 February 2018.

== Reception ==
=== Box office ===
In Finland, The Unknown Soldier grossed €3.0 million during its previews and opening weekend. It broke the record for the biggest opening weekend for a Finnish-language film and settled overall third after Star Wars: The Force Awakens and Spectre. It was the highest-grossing film of 2017 in Finnish cinema with €13.5 million.

=== Critical response ===
The film received an average rating of 3.67 out of 5 in Finland according to a review aggregation article by the newspaper Aamulehti. Marko Ahonen from the newspaper Keskisuomalainen appraised The Unknown Soldier with five out of five, describing it as "an impressive pacifist war film" where the reality of combat is forlorn and unpleasant. He criticised the sound mixing, which made dialogue difficult to understand sometimes. Hufvudstadsbladet's Krister Uggeldahl called it "as traditional as respectful" and "a movie that breathes and lives (even when death is harvesting its victims), but at no stage apologizes" and gave it four out of five while thanking the actors' complete work. Markus Määttänen from Aamulehti likewise put the movie at four out of five and compared it to the poetic war experience of Thin Red Line, but disparaged how some characters, Lehto in particular, were diminished compared to previous film adaptations. Juho Rissanen and Taneli Topelius of Finnish tabloids Iltalehti and Ilta-Sanomat, gave the film a full five out of five. Rissanen called it a masterpiece and "a film the 100 year old Finland truly deserves" and that the "psychological effect of war on men is now presented more visibly than before" while Topelius praised the portrayal of the home front and the inclusion of women in the film, with both of them calling the film dark, honest and gritty.

Conversely, Juho Typpö from Helsingin Sanomat gave the film two stars out of five, arguing that the film failed to justify its existence because it was too similar to the novel's previous film adaptations. According to Typpö, the film was not bold enough, and instead followed conventional depictions of masculinity in Finnish cinema and was a safe, risk-free attempt to please everyone under Finland's 100 year celebrations. He also criticized that the film didn't take a stand against the rise of far right groups in Finland.

In Sweden, The Unknown Soldier received an average rating of 3.2 out of 5 according to the Kritiker.se review aggregator website. Björn Jansson from Sveriges Radio said the film is "a good depiction of the war's meaninglessness and insecurity" but that it is difficult to get along with its "futility, emptiness and waiting in muddy trenches", rating it three out of five. Johan Croneman of Dagens Nyheter said the film was powerful and sad at the same time, but remarked that "[u]nfortunately, we cannot see the 3-hour original version in Swedish cinemas, instead, the 47-minute cut-off international release, and it's a rumphap that the film is suffering from. Several shades have been lost, it is quite obvious even if you did not see the original." Croneman put the film at four out of five. Jens Peterson of the tabloid Aftonbladet rated the film at three out of five and said that it "is well-told and strong, but not as original today."

Sigurd Vik from the Norwegian radio channel NRK P3 appraised the film with four out of six. He said that the film's chronicle-type screenplay "sometimes becomes a bit stiff and unobtrusive", but concluded that the film is an "interesting piece of war history" and a "raw and realistic infantry movie." Britt Sørensen of the newspaper Bergens Tidende commented that The Unknown Soldier is a film for those "who are particularly interested in war films and war history, or history in general. But it also has moments of cinematic beauty and profound humanity." She rated it at four out of six.

=== Accolades ===
Year	Award / Film Festival	Category	Recipient(s)	Result	Ref(s)
2018	Jussi Awards	Best Film	Aku Louhimies, Mikko Tenhunen, Miia Haavisto	Nominated	
2018	Jussi Awards	Best Director	Aku Louhimies	Nominated	
2018	Jussi Awards	Best Actor	Eero Aho	Won	
2018	Jussi Awards	Best Supporting Actor	Aku Hirviniemi	Nominated	
2018	Jussi Awards	Best Supporting Actor	Jussi Vatanen	Nominated	
2018	Jussi Awards	Best Editing	Benjamin Mercer	Won	
2018	Jussi Awards	Best Cinematography	Mika Orasmaa	Nominated	
2018	Jussi Awards	Best Music	Lasse Enersen	Nominated	
2018	Jussi Awards	Best Sound Design	Kirka Sainio	Won	
2018	Jussi Awards	Best Makeup Design	Salla Yli-Luopa	Won	

== Different versions and home video ==
There are three cuts of the film, inspired by the different versions of similarly acclaimed war films Das Boot (1981) and The Winter War (1989).

- International theatrical cut (133 minutes)
- Finnish theatrical cut (180 minutes)
- Finnish TV series (283 minutes)

The extended, five-part TV series incorporates additional footage and premiered domestically on 30 December 2018.

The international and Finnish theatrical cuts have been released in various countries on DVD and Blu-ray, while all three versions have been released in Finland and Germany on both formats.

== Upcoming loose sequel ==
Louhimies announced that he is working on a film called Lapland War (Lapin sota), which has already been called a loose sequel to Louhimies' The Unknown Soldier. However, Lapland War has nothing to do with Linna's story, but instead is based on the 2012 novel The Iron Boot (Rauta-antura) by Antti Tuuri, which is set in the Lapland War that followed the Continuation War. Lapland War movie will premiere in Finland on October 23, 2026.

== See also ==
- Finnish literature
- Finnish military ranks
- Finland–Russia relations
- Foreign relations of Russia
- Historiography in the Soviet Union
- List of anti-war films
- Military history of Finland during World War II

=== Other Finnish World War II films ===
- Ambush (1999 film)
- Beyond the Front Line
- The Boys (1962 Finnish film)
- The Interrogation (film)
- Tali-Ihantala 1944
- The Winter War (film)
