= Aku Louhimies =

Finnish film director and screenwriter

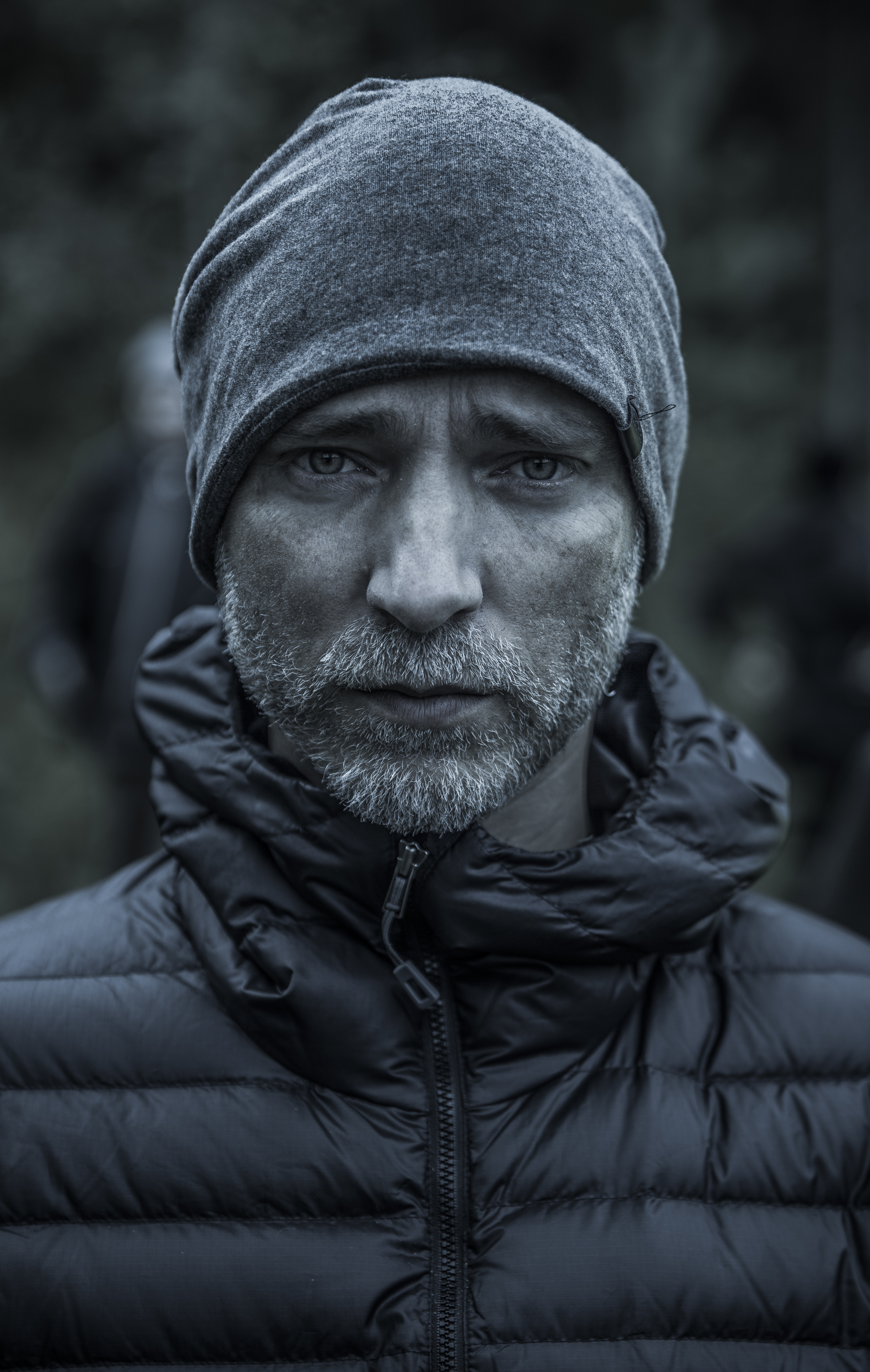
- Louhimies in 2016, photo by Juuli Aschan
- Born: Aku Urban Louhimies; 3 July 1968 (age 58); Helsinki, Finland
- Occupations: Film director, screenwriter
- Years active: 2000–present

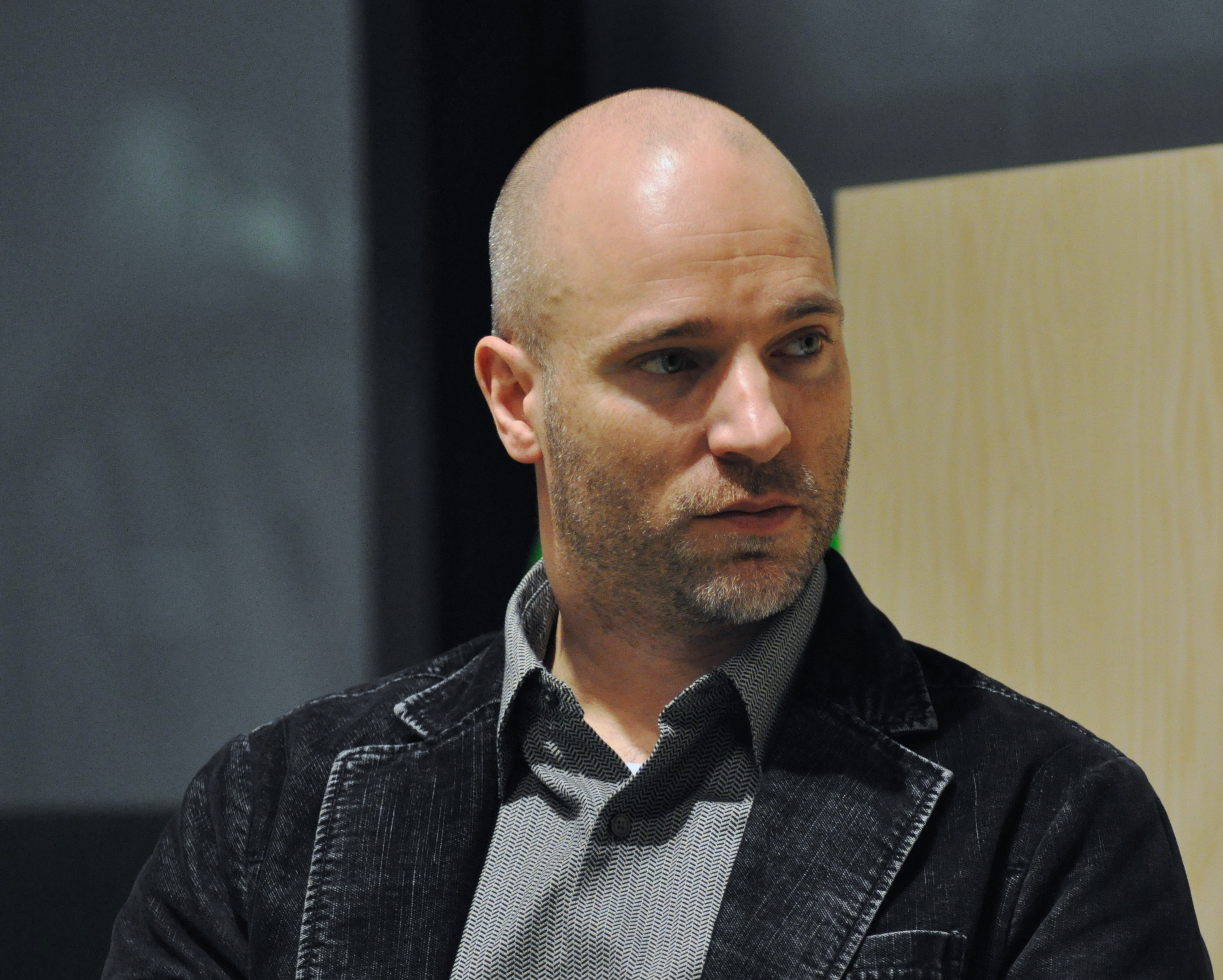
Louhimies in 2009

Aku Urban Louhimies (born 3 July 1968) is a Finnish film director and screenwriter. He has directed feature films, television series, documentary films, commercials and music videos. His international breakthrough was the 2016 serial drama Rebellion. He directed and produced the 2017 war film The Unknown Soldier which is the biggest box office hit since 1955 in Finland.

== Education ==
Louhimies graduated from Billings West High School in Montana, U.S. After returning to Helsinki, he studied history at the University of Helsinki, and film directing at the University of Art and Design Helsinki in Finland. He is fluent in English, Finnish, Swedish, and Spanish.

In December 2025, Louhimies was promoted to an officer rank of Captain (in reserves) by the Finnish Defence Forces.

== Career ==
=== Feature films ===
Restless (2000) was the first feature film directed by Louhimies, and he has since directed ten other feature films, among them the award-winning Frozen Land (2005), the war drama Tears of April (2008), the multi-narrative drama Naked Harbour (2012) and the hard-hitting crime-drama 8-ball (2013).

In 2017, Louhimies directed a World War II drama, The Unknown Soldier, that had its premiere on 27 October 2017 as a part of the official 100th anniversary of Finnish independence program. The film is based on Väinö Linna's acclaimed novel The Unknown Soldier from 1954. The international premiere was on 23 November 2017 at the Tallinn Black Nights Film Festival, followed by Ireland, Sweden, Iceland and Norway. The film was described by critics as gritty, forlorn, honest and realistic as well as a pacifist piece confronting less pleasant sides of Finnish history. The film is Finland's biggest box office hit since 1955, with over million viewers, and it is still gathering more views on TV and on streaming platforms.

In 2020, Louhimies directed an international thriller, Omerta 6/12, where Finland's Independence Day celebration on 6 December is crudely interrupted by an attack to the Presidential Residence. The film is starring actors Jasper Pääkkönen, Nanna Blondell and Sverrir Guðnason. It was released in winter 2021. Also in 2020, he directed the feministic romantic drama The Wait, which he created with Inka Kallén, based on a novel by Juhani Aho. Due to the COVID-19 pandemic, The Wait was released in 2022. It is the world's first carbon negative film. The film received an award for the Best Original Score by Esa-Pekka Salonen, at Tallinn Black Nights Film Festival.

=== Television projects ===
Louhimies has also directed several television projects, among others the multiple awards-winning television series Irtiottoja (2003).

In 2016, Louhimies made his international breakthrough by directing the serial drama Rebellion for Irish broadcaster RTÉ and Netflix, starring Charlie Murphy, Brian Gleeson, Ruth Bradley, Sarah Greene, Michelle Fairley, Niamh Cusack and Ian McElhinney. The five-part television mini-series depicts fictional characters in Dublin during the 1916 Rising and it was commemorating the 100th Anniversary of the Easter Rising. The series premiered on SundanceTV in the US on 24 April 2016, and on YLE (Finnish Broadcasting Service) on 1 June 2016. The series is available on Netflix worldwide, except in Ireland and Finland.

In 2019, Louhimies directed a season of an English-language thriller series, Rig 45, which aired in 2020. Starring Rune Temte, Filip Berg, Andrei Alén and Natalie Gumede, Rig 45 is one of NENT Group's most successful original series.

In 2023, he directed the series Conflict, that he has created with Andrei Alén. In Conflict, a small Finnish seaside town is preparing to celebrate midsummer's eve, when an unknown enemy invades the peninsula. The series has an international cast and it was released in November 2024. The series has been very popular since the beginning, with over one million viewers first week and it won a prize for the best drama and best direction at the Golden Venla. It has an international distribution by Keshet.

In 2023, Louhimies also directed The Inheritance for Channel 5, starring Gaynor Faye, Larry Lamb, Robert James-Collier, Jemima Rooper and Samantha Bond.

=== Other projects ===
Louhimies has also directed short films, documentaries, music videos and commercials since 1995.

In 2004, Louhimies was elected Director of the Year by the Association of Finnish Film Directors. From 2011 to 2014, he was the chairman of the association.

In 2012, Louhimies accepted the role of jury member for the first Saint Petersburg International Film Festival and his film Naked Harbour (Vuosaari) was added to the festival's non-competition programme "Screenings in honour of filmmakers".

=== Criticism ===
In March 2018, eight Finnish actors came forward accusing Louhimies to have subjected them to demeaning tactics in the work. At the 2018 Jussi Awards during his acceptance speech, after receiving the Audience Award, Louhimies thanked everyone, who had started the process to "air the movie industry". He has also responded to the accusations in his Facebook posts.

== Partial filmography ==
- Restless (Levottomat), 2000
- Lovers & Leavers (Kuutamolla), 2002
- Irtiottoja (TV series), 2003
- Frozen Land (Paha maa), 2005
- Man Exposed (Riisuttu mies), 2006
- Frozen City (Valkoinen kaupunki), 2006
- Tears of April (Käsky), 2008
- Naked Harbour (Vuosaari), 2012
- 8-ball (8-pallo), 2013
- Rebellion (TV mini-series), 2016
- The Unknown Soldier (Tuntematon sotilas), 2017
- The Wait (Odotus), 2021
- Omerta 6/12, 2021
- The Inheritance, 2023
- Conflict (Konflikti), 2024
- Lapland War (Lapin sota), 2026

The book Aku Louhimies: Elokuvaunelmia (Like, 2017) by non-fiction author Satu Jaatinen, examines the director's career from Restless to The Unknown Soldier.

=== Selected awards ===
- Lovers & Leavers (Kuutamolla)
  - 2003 Cinequest San Jose Film Festival: Best Feature
  - 2003 Durango Film Festival: Jury Award Best Narrative Feature
- Irtiottoja
  - 2004 Venla Awards: Best Director
- Frozen Land (Paha maa)
  - 2005 Moscow International Film Festival: Special Jury Prize
  - 2005 Lübeck Nordic Film Days: NDR Promotion Prize – Honorable Mention
  - 2005 Leeds International Film Festival: Golden Owl Award
  - 2005 Göteborg Film Festival: Church of Sweden Film Award, FIPRESCI Prize, Nordic Film Prize
  - 2005 Bergen International Film Festival: Jury Award
  - 2005 Athens International Film Festival: Best Screenplay
  - 2006 Jussi Awards: Best Director, Best Script
- Frozen City (Valkoinen kaupunki)
  - 2006 Lübeck Nordic Film Days: Prize of the Ecumenical Jury – Honorable Mention
  - 2006 Karlovy Vary International Film Festival: Don Quijote Award – Special Mention, FIPRESCI Prize, Label Europa Cinemas
  - 2006 Ghent International Film Festival: Best Director
  - 2007 Jussi Awards: Best Director
- Naked Harbour (Vuosaari)
  - 2012 Lübeck Nordic Film Days: The Interfilm Church Prize
  - 2012 Festroia International Film Festival: CICAE Award
- The Unknown Soldier (Tuntematon sotilas)
  - 2018 Jussi Awards: Best Film - Audience Award, Best Actor, Best Sound Design, Best Editing, Best Make-up
- The Wait (Odotus)
  - 2021 Tallinn Black Nights Film Festival: Best Original Score by Esa-Pekka Salonen
- Conflict (Konflikti)
  - 2025 Golden Venla: Best Drama, Best Direction

His 2000 film Restless was entered into the 22nd Moscow International Film Festival.
