= Pyynikki Summer Theatre =

Open air theatre in Tampere, Finland

Coordinates: 61°29′28″N 023°44′18″E

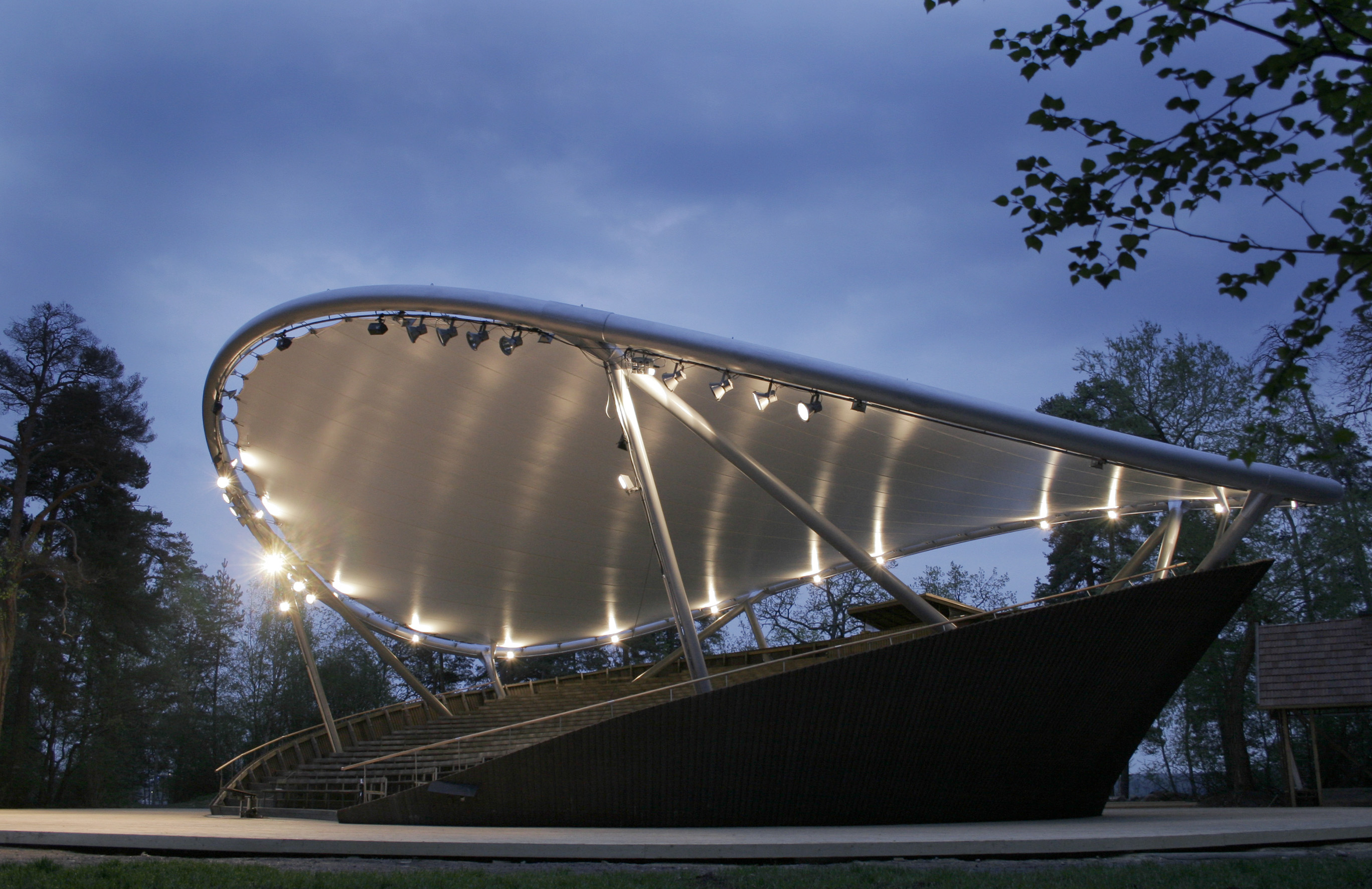
The revolving auditorium of Pyynikki Summer Theatre in Tampere, Finland

Pyynikki Summer Theatre (Finnish: Pyynikin kesäteatteri) or Pyynikki Open Air Theatre is a theatre operating in Tampere, Finland, known especially for its revolving auditorium. It is one of the largest summer theatres in Finland and has been running uninterrupted longer than any other open-air theatre in the country.

== History ==
The theatre was founded in 1948 and was originally named Tampereen kesäteatteri (Tampere Summer Theatre). It started operating in Joselininniemi, on the shore of the lake Pyhäjärvi, where the performances continue to be held until today. In 1955 the name of the theatre was changed to Pyynikin kesäteatteri. The theatre increased its popularity throughout the latter half of the 1950s.

The construction of the rotating auditorium, designed by the architect Reijo Ojanen and holding 800 seats, was completed in 1959. The seating area could be turned to face different sets.

The real breakthrough for Pyynikki Summer Theatre came in the 1960s with the play Tuntematon sotilas (The Unknown Soldier). This stage adaptation of the novel of the same name by Väinö Linna became hugely popular and remained in the repertoire for nearly a decade.

The revolving auditorium was fully renovated in the mid-1990s, when the number of seats was increased to 836. Since January 2001, the theatre has been run by Pyynikin Kesäteatterisäätiö (Pyynikki Summer Theatre Foundation). In 2005 a roof for the auditorium was completed, thus lengthening the usability of the theatre in spring and autumn in the Nordic weather conditions.

Tampereen Teatterikerho, which managed the theatre before the foundation was formed, has been an important influence in the cultural life of Tampere, because its support enabled the founding of Tampere Theatre Festival (Tampereen Teatterikesä) in 1969 and Teatteri 2000 in 1985.

== Repertoire ==
The repertoire of Pyynikki Summer Theatre has from the beginning consisted mainly of Finnish drama and comedy. Among others, works by Aleksis Kivi, Minna Canth, Johannes Linnankoski, Joel Lehtonen, Maiju Lassila, Maria Jotuni, Jalmari Finne, Väinö Linna, Kalle Päätalo and Hella Wuolijoki have been adapted for the Pyynikki stage. Of international classics, plays by William Shakespeare have been the most often performed.

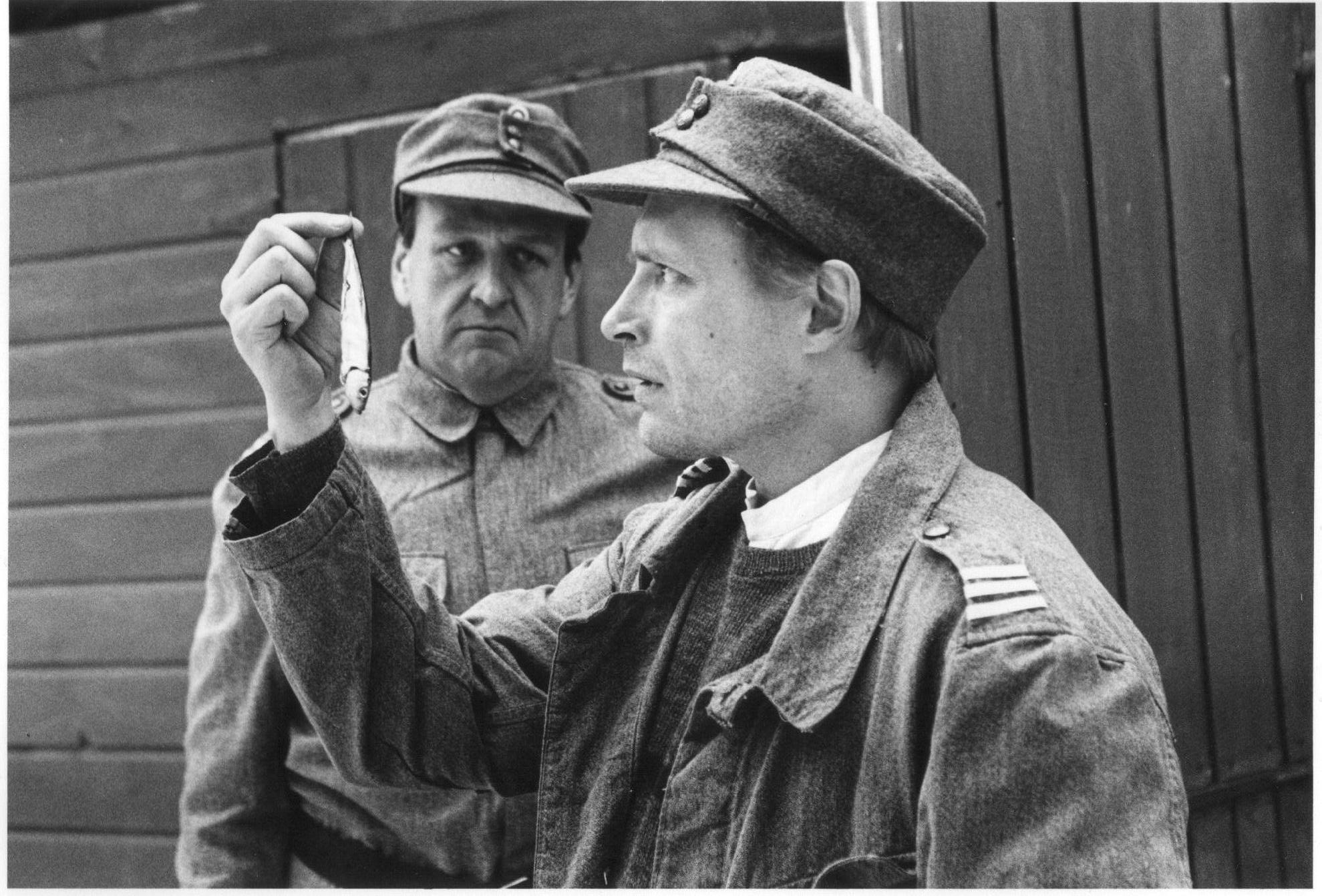
Mikko Kivinen as Mäkilä and Kari Heiskanen as Hietanen in the 1997 stage production of Tuntematon sotilas

The best-known and most successful play in Pyynikki Summer Theatre has been Tuntematon sotilas by Väinö Linna, directed by Edvin Laine, who had also directed a 1955 film adaption based on Linna's novel. Tuntematon sotilas the play premiered in 1961 and continued to be performed for nine summers. A total of 348,854 people saw the play.

In the 1970s the most viewed productions were Ihmisiä kairassa by Kalle Päätalo, directed by Edvin Laine (1977) and Ihmisiä suviyössä by F.E. Sillanpää, directed by Rauli Lehtonen (1978). The biggest box office successes of the 1980s in Pyynikki were A Midsummer Night's Dream by William Shakespeare, directed by Jiří Menzel, and Kätkäläinen by Simo Hämäläinen, directed by Markku Onttonen. The latter made Pyynikin Kesäteatteri the 7th biggest theatre in Finland.

The repertoire of the 1990s was structured around Akseli ja Elina and Täällä Pohjantähden alla (Under the North Star), both based on novels by Väinö Linna, as well as a new version of Tuntematon sotilas. These were all directed by Kalle Holmberg. In the 2000s, the emphasis has been on comedy and plays featuring plenty of Finnish popular music.

Plays performed in Pyynikki Summer Theatre 1990-2007

- 1990 Hugo Raudsepp: Puolimatka pulassa
- 1991 Maiju Lassila: Kilpakosijat
- 1992 Tauno Yliruusu: Kesäillan valssi
- 1993–94 Väinö Linna: Akseli ja Elina
- 1995–96 Väinö Linna: Täällä Pohjantähden alla (Under the North Star)
- 1997 Väinö Linna: Tuntematon sotilas (The Unknown Soldier)
- 1998 Laila Hietamies: Maan kämmenellä
- 1999 Lars Hulden & Sven Sid: Kesäpäivä Kangasalla
- 2000 Kalle Päätalo: Pohjalta ponnistaen
- 2001 Agapetus: Aatamin puvussa ja vähän Eevankin
- 2002 Heikki Luoma: Vain muutaman huijarin tähden
- 2003 Heikki Vihinen: Hopeinen kuu
- 2004 Jukka Virtanen: Albatrossi ja Heiskanen
- 2005 Johannes Linnankoski: Tulipunakukka
- 2006 Veikko Huovinen: Lampaansyöjät (The Sheep Eaters)
- 2007 Heikki Luoma: Mooseksen perintö
- 2008 Timo Kahilainen ja Heikki Vihinen: Kalliolle kukkulalle
- 2009 Hella Wuolijoki & Bertolt Brecht: Iso-Heikkilän isäntä ja hänen renkinsä Kalle
- 2010 Anna-Leena Härkönen: Häräntappoase (How to Kill a Bull)
- 2011 Paavo Haavikko: Rauta-aika
- 2012 Suokas-Syrjä-Vihinen: Kuuma kesä '85
- 2013 Suokas-Syrjä-Vihinen: Kuuma kesä '85
- 2014 Heikki Luoma: Pirunpelto
- 2015 Veera Nieminen: Avioliittosimulaattori
