= The Year of the Hare =

The Year of the Hare may refer to:

- The Year of the Hare (novel), a 1975 Finnish novel
- The Year of the Hare (1977 film), a 1977 Finnish drama based on the novel The Year of the Hare
- The Year of the Hare (2006 film), a 2006 French film based on the novel The Year of the Hare
- Year of the Hare (EP), a 2015 EP by the Canadian band Fucked Up
- The Year of the Hare, a year in the Chinese zodiac

== See also ==
- Chinese zodiac
- Chinese calendar
- Year of the Rabbit (disambiguation)
