= Kosti Klemelä =

Finnish actor (1920–2006)

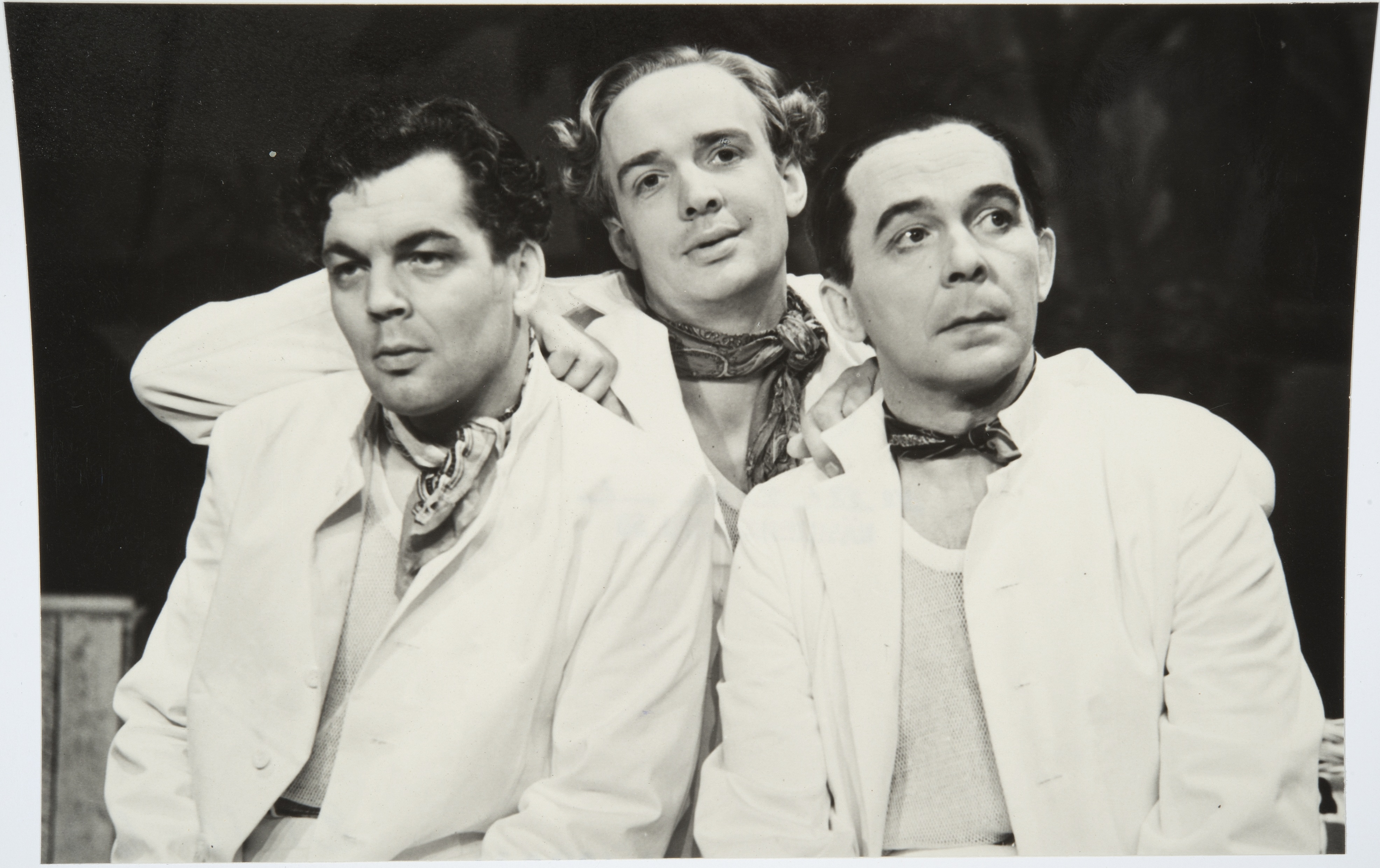
- Kosti Klemelä (centre)
- Born: 29 February 1920; Metsämaa, Finland
- Died: 26 March 2006 (aged 86); Helsinki, Finland

Kosti Klemelä (29 February 1920 – 26 March 2006) was a Finnish actor. He is best remembered for playing the role of Lt. Koskela in the Edvin Laine film The Unknown Soldier (1955). In addition to his film career, he worked for the Finnish National Theatre until his retirement. He considered his theatrical career to be more important to him than his film career.

He is buried in the Hietaniemi Cemetery in Helsinki.

== Filmography ==
Year	Title	Role	Notes
1951	Pitkäjärveläiset	Juha	
1954	Opri	Jussi	
1955	Kaunis Kaarina		
1955	Tuntematon sotilas	Koskela	
1956	Yhteinen vaimomme	Erkki Lahtinen	
1956	Viisi vekkulia	Doctor Alpo Heikkinen	
1957	Nummisuutarit	Jaakko	
1958	Autuas eversti	Albert	
1958	Mies tältä tähdeltä	Wessman, economist	
1958	Sven Tuuva	Matti, Sven's brother	
1959	Kovaa peliä Pohjolassa	Konstaapeli	Uncredited
1960	Skandaali tyttökoulussa	Amos Pölkkynen	
1960	Myöhästynyt hääyö	Engineer	
1968	Täällä Pohjantähden alla	Nimismies	
1970	Akseli ja Elina	Nimismies	
1973	Meiltähän tämä käy	Ministeri Vepsäläinen	
1976	Doverie		
1977	Viimeinen savotta	Kirkkoherra #2	
1977	Jäniksen vuosi	U. Kärkkäinen	
1993	Isä meidän	Old Man	
