= Pitka =

Pitka or Pitkä may refer to:

- Pitka, Iran, a village in Mazandaran Province, Iran
- Edward G. Pitka Sr. Airport, state-owned public-use airport in Galena, Alaska
- Elämä lyhyt, Rytkönen pitkä, 1991 Finnish novel by Arto Paasilinna
- EML Admiral Pitka (A230), Beskytteren-class ocean patrol vessel of the Estonian Navy
- Johan Pitka (1872–1944), famous Estonian military commander from the Estonian War of Independence until World War II
- Pitkä ihana leikki, the first album by Finnish pop/rock singer-songwriter Maija Vilkkumaa
- Rita Pitka Blumenstein, the first certified traditional doctor in Alaska
