= Arto Paasilinna =

Finnish writer

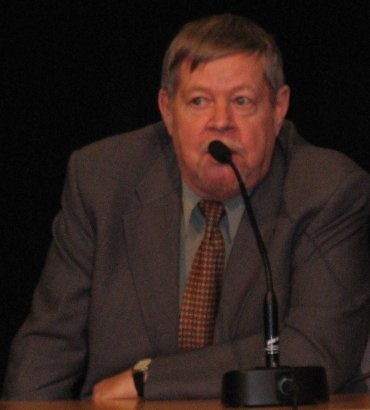
- October 2007 (aged 65), Helsinki Book Fair
- Born: 20 April 1942; Kittilä, Lapland, Finland
- Died: 15 October 2018 (aged 76); Espoo, Finland
- Education: Adult Education College, Lapland (1962-1963)
- Occupations: journalist, novelist, poet
- Relatives: Erno Paasilinna (brother); Reino Paasilinna (brother)
- Writing career
- Period: since 1972 (fiction) since 1964 (non-fiction)
- Genres: picaresque, comedy, satire
- Notable works: The Year of the Hare (1975); The Howling Miller (1981)
- Notable awards: Air Inter (France); 1989 The Year of the Hare Acerbi (Italy); 1994 The Year of the Hare UNESCO Collection; 1994 The Year of the Hare

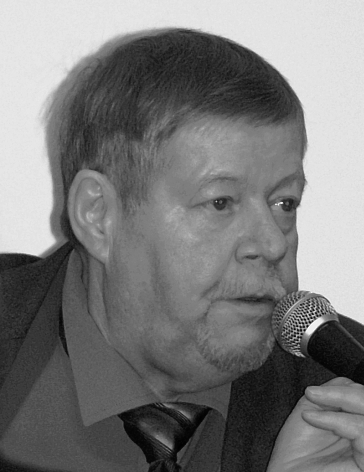
Paasilinna at the age of 65 in November 2007

Arto Tapio Paasilinna (Finnish: [ˈɑrto ˈpɑːsiˌlinːɑ], approximately AR-toh PAH-see-LIN-nah; 20 April 1942 – 15 October 2018) was a Finnish writer, being a former journalist turned comic novelist. One of Finland's most successful novelists, he won a broad readership outside of Finland in a way few other Finnish authors have before. Translated into 27 languages, over seven million copies of his books have been sold worldwide, and he has been claimed as "instrumental in generating the current level of interest in books from Finland".

Paasilinna is mostly known for his 1975 novel The Year of the Hare (Jäniksen vuosi), a bestseller in France and Finland, translated into 18 languages, awarded three international prizes, and adapted twice into feature films: a 1977 Finnish film directed by Risto Jarva called The Year of the Hare, and a 2006 French film directed by Marc Rivière called Le Lièvre de Vatanen.

Arto Paasilinna's brothers are the writers Erno Paasilinna, Reino Paasilinna and Mauri Paasilinna.

== Early and family life ==
Arto Paasilinna was born on 20 April 1942 in the Alakylä part of the municipality of Kittilä, in Lapland, Finland. His parents were Väinö Paasilinna (born Gullstén, changed his surname in 1934 after a family conflict) and Hilda-Maria Paasilinna (born Niva). The Paasilinnas had seven children, five sons and two daughters, including the writer Erno Paasilinna; the writer, MEP and TV personality Reino Paasilinna; the painter Sirpa Paasilinna-Schlagenwarth; and the writer Mauri Paasilinna.

Paasilinna studied at the General and Elementary School Line at the Lapland Folk Academy.

== Career ==
Paasilinna initially worked as a journalist at Nuoren Voiman Liitto, Nuori Voima, and various newspapers as a writer and editor. At the weekly magazine Apu, he was an editor (1968–1970) and later a columnist (1975–1988).

In 1975, at the age of 33, Paasilinna found journalism growing "more superficial and meaningless" and desired a change; that summer, he sold his boat to fund the writing of The Year of the Hare. The book was an immediate success and from 1975 on Paasilinna became an independent writer able to support himself with his novels, signed to Finnish publisher WSOY since 1977. He still wrote journalism articles and was a columnist on Finnish radio.

In 2000, Paasilinna was included in the 6th edition of literary critic Pekka Tarkka^{(fi)}'s dictionary Suomalaisia nykykirjailijoita ("Finnish Literary Authors", 1st ed. 1967).

In 2002, for Paasilinna's 60th anniversary, journalist Eino Leino published a biography of Paasilinna called Lentojätkä. Arto Paasilinnan elämä" ("The Flight Dude"). The same year Paasilinna published his own autobiography called Yhdeksän unelmaa ("Nine Night's Dream").

As of 2009, Paasilinna had published about 12 non-fiction books and 35 novels, with almost one novel each year from 1972 to 2009 (except 1973, 1978, 2002): as his publishers say, "The annual Paasilinna is as much an element of the Finnish autumn as falling birch leaves." He is "constantly being translated into new languages", and 18 of his books have been translated overall into at least 27 languages: the translations beyond neighboring Scandinavian countries include: 17 into Italian, 16 into German, 11 into French, 9 into Slovenian, 6 into Dutch, 5 into Spanish, 4 into Korean, and 2 into English, Ukrainian and Catalan. Described as "The brightest star in the Finnish translated-literature firmament" by Finnish newspaper Helsingin Sanomat, his success is claimed as having been "instrumental in generating the current level of interest in books from Finland" by his publisher WSOY.

Paasilinna's books reflect quite common Finnish life, usually from a middle-aged male perspective, and in rural Finland. Fast-paced, light and humorous in style, many of these narratives can be described as picaresque adventure stories with often a satirical angle towards modern life. Certain of his stories have been described as modern fables, such as The Year of the Hare, which sets an ex-journalist's quest for authentic life and values in the Finnish backwoods against the emptiness and meaninglessness of modern consumer society. Vatanen, the hero of this novel, takes an injured young hare with him on his quest, nursing the animal back to health, while his own dissatisfaction with his former urban lifestyle becomes ever more evident.

His 1974 novel Paratiisisaaren Vangit is the humorous story of a UN charter that crashes on a deserted Pacific island. The passengers are lumberjacks and other forestry workers, midwives and nurses. As with The Year of the Hare, the narrator is a journalist. The multinational castaways (Finnish, Swedish, Norwegian and English) give Paasilinna ample opportunity to poke fun at issues of language domination and national stereotypes. The castaways set up a cashless society in which the only remuneration comes in the form of a cup of alcohol distilled in their jungle café in exchange for work for the collectivity. There is also a family planning clinic offering free IUDs. Soon, they find that they are not alone on the island and come up with a plan to get help.

Two of his novels, Lentävä kirvesmies and Rovasti Huuskosen petomainen miespalvelija were adapted to graphic novels by Hannu Lukkarinen.

== Bibliography ==
=== In Finnish ===
Titles in quotes are indicative for untranslated books.

Fiction His 36 novels are:

- 1972: Operaatio Finlandia ("Operation Finlandia")
- 1974: Paratiisisaaren vangit ("Prisoners of the Paradise Island")
- 1975: Jäniksen vuosi (tr. The Year of the Hare, 1995)
- 1976: Onnellinen mies ("The Happy Man")
- 1977: Isoisää etsimässä ("Looking for Grandfather")
- 1979: Sotahevonen ("Warhorse")
- 1980: Herranen aika ("Goodness Gracious")
- 1981: Ulvova mylläri (tr. The Howling Miller, 2007)
- 1982: Kultainen nousukas ("Golden Climber")
- 1983: Hirtettyjen kettujen metsä ("The Forest of the Hanged Foxes")
- 1984: Ukkosenjumalan poika ("The Son of the Thunder God")
- 1985: Parasjalkainen laivanvarustaja ("Bestfooted Shipwright")
- 1986: Vapahtaja Surunen ("Saviour Surunen")
- 1987: Koikkalainen kaukaa ("Koikkalainen from Far Away")
- 1988: Suloinen myrkynkeittäjä ("The Sweet Poison Cook")
- 1989: Auta armias ("Heaven Help Us")
- 1990: Hurmaava joukkoitsemurha ("A Charming Mass Suicide")
- 1991: Elämä lyhyt, Rytkönen pitkä ("Life Short, Rytkönen Long")
- 1992: Maailman paras kylä ("The Best Village in the World")
- 1993: Aatami ja Eeva ("Adam and Eve")
- 1994: Volomari Volotisen ensimmäinen vaimo ynnä muuta vanhaa tavaraa ("Volomari Volotinen's First Wife and Assorted Other Old Items")
- 1995: Rovasti Huuskosen petomainen miespalvelija ("Reverend Huuskonen's Beastly Manservant")
- 1996: Lentävä kirvesmies ("The Flying Carpenter")
- 1997: Tuomiopäivän aurinko nousee ("Doomsday's Sun Rising")
- 1998: Hirttämättömien lurjusten yrttitarha ("The Herb Garden of the Unhanged Scoundrels")
- 1999: Hirnuva maailmanloppu ("Neighing End of the World")
- 2000: Ihmiskunnan loppulaukka ("Mankind's Final Trot")
- 2001: Kymmenen riivinrautaa ("The Ten Shrews")
- 2003: Liikemies Liljeroosin ilmalaivat ("Airships of Businessman Liljeroos")
- 2004: Tohelo suojelusenkeli ("Goofy Guardian Angel")
- 2005: Suomalainen kärsäkirja ("Finnish Snoutbook")
- 2006: Kylmät hermot, kuuma veri ("Cold Nerves, Hot Blood")
- 2007: Rietas rukousmylly ("Lewd Prayermill")
- 2008: Neitosten karkuretki ("Runaway Trip of the Maidens")
- 2009: Elävänä omissa hautajaisissa ("Alive at His Own Funeral")
- 2019: Laki vaatii vainajia ("The Law Requires Casualties")

Non-fiction His other books include:

- 1964: Karhunkaataja Ikä-Alpi ("Ikä-Alpi, Bear Hunter") - first book
- 1971: Kansallinen vieraskirja, graffiitti eli vessakirjoituksia - toilet graffiti guide
- 1984: Seitsemän saunahullua suomalaista (tr. Businessman's Guide to the Finnish Sauna, 1984)
- 1986: Kymmenen tuhatta vuotta (tr. Illustrated Episodes in a 10,000-year Odyssey: A Businessman's Guide to Finnish History, 1986)
- 1998: Hankien tarinoita (tr. Tales of the Snowfields: Finnish Skiing Through the Ages, 1998)
- 2002: Yhdeksän unelmaa ("Nine Night's Dreams") - autobiography
- 2003: Sadan vuoden savotta ("One Hundred Years of Logging") - history of Finnish logging

=== In English ===
As of 2009:

Fiction

- 1995: The Year of the Hare (Jäniksen vuosi, 1975)
- 2007: The Howling Miller (Ulvova mylläri, 1981) (tr. Will Hobson from French)

Non-fiction

- 1984: Businessman's Guide to the Finnish Sauna (Seitsemän saunahullua suomalaista, 1984)
- 1986: Illustrated Episodes in a 10,000-year Odyssey: A Businessman's Guide to Finnish History (Kymmenen tuhatta vuotta, 1986)
- 1998: Tales of the Snowfields: Finnish Skiing Through the Ages (Hankien tarinoita, 1998)

== Filmography ==
Many books have been adapted into movies (some dubbed into English), including:

- 1977: Jäniksen vuosi / The Year of the Hare (after the 1975 novel)
- 1982: Ulvova mylläri / The Howling Miller (after the 1981 novel)
- 1986: Hirtettyjen kettujen metsä (after the 1983 novel)
- 1996: Elämä lyhyt, Rytkönen pitkä (after the 1991 novel)
- 2000: Hurmaava joukkoitsemurha / A Charming Mass Suicide (after the 1990 novel)
- 2002: Kymmenen riivinrautaa (after the 2001 novel)
- 2006: Le Lièvre de Vatanen (French for "Vatanen's Hare", after the 1975 novel)

== Personal life ==
In 2008 and 2009, while still living in Espoo, Paasilinna was featured in Finnish tabloids for his incoherent behaviour, including reckless driving.

In October 2009, Paasilinna was rushed to a hospital due to a stroke. In April 2010, he was moved to a convalescent home for recovery, and his son named as his treasurer. Paasilinna died on 15 October 2018 in a nursing home in Espoo.
