= Asta Backman =

Finnish actress (1917–2010)

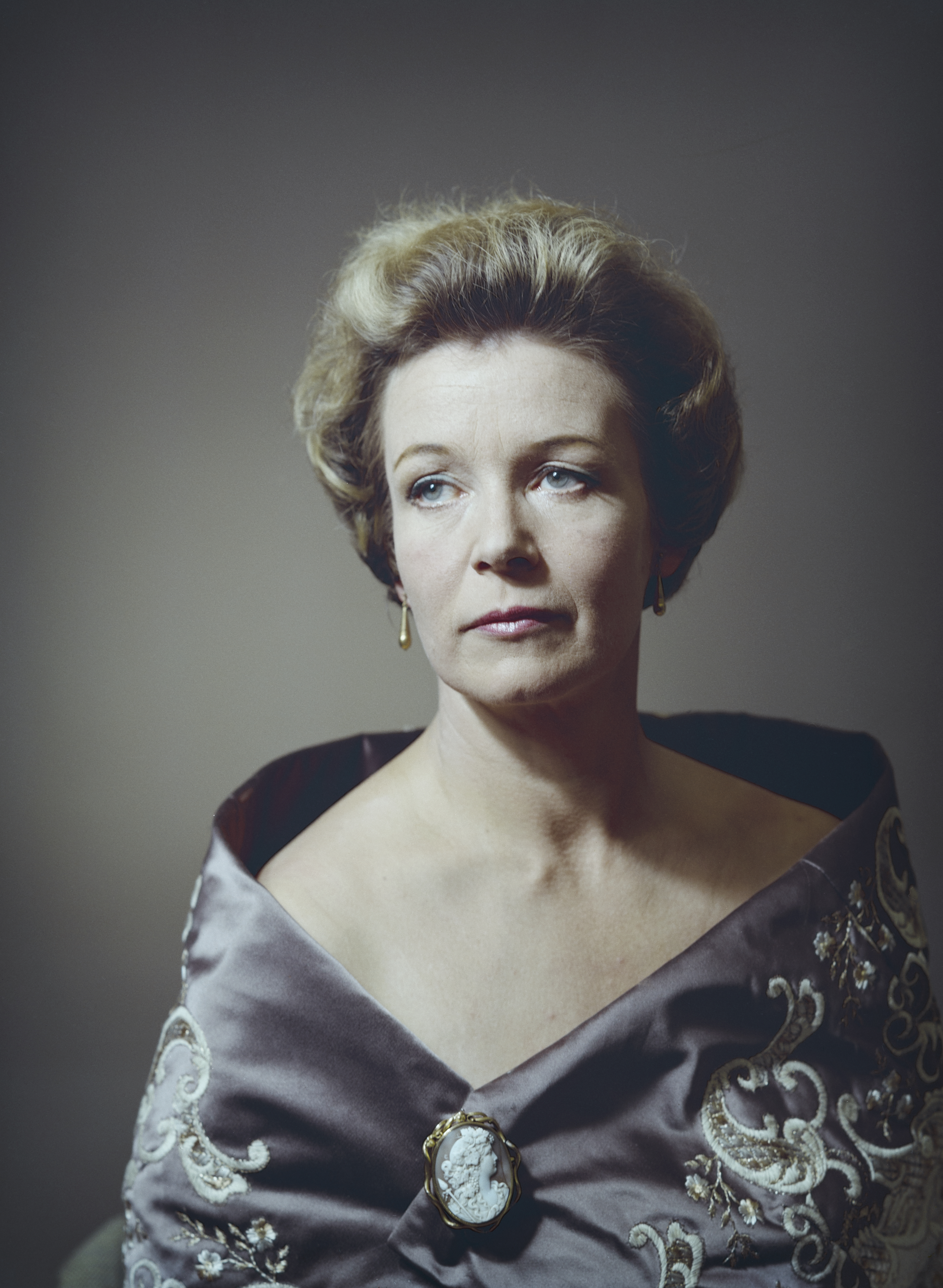
- Born: Agda Elisabeth Inberg; 4 February 1917; Vaasa, Finland
- Died: 18 February 2010 (aged 93); Helsinki
- Occupation: Actress
- Years active: 1946–1987
- Spouse: Fritz-Hugo Backman

Asta Elisabeth Backman née Inberg (born Agda Elisabeth Inberg; 4 February 1917 – 18 February 2010) was a Finnish film, television and theatre actress who appeared in more than 80 works.

== Early life ==
Backman was born on 4 February 1917 in Vaasa, Finland.

== Career ==
Since 1946, Backman has appeared in ten films and almost fifty television productions.

=== Film and television work ===
Täällä Pohjantähden Alla (1968) Here Beneath The North Star

Akseli Ja Elina (1970) Askeli And Elina

- Synnin Jäljet (1946)
- Ylijäämänainen (1951)
- Veteraanin Voitto (1955)
- Pastori Jussilainen (1955)
- Neiti Talonmies (1955)
- Kustaa III (1963)
- Kuuma Kissa? (1968)
- Täällä Pohjantähden Alla
- Kesyttömät Veljekset (1969)
- Pohjantähti (1973)
- Runoilija ja Muusa (1978)
- Olga (1978)
- Vihreän Kullan Maa (1987), television series

== Personal life ==
She was married to the German actor Fritz-Hugo Backman, until his death in 1993.

== Death ==
She died on 18 February 2010 in Helsinki.
