= Paavo Hukkinen =

Finnish actor (1911–1988)

- Born: Paul Yrjö Untamo Hukkinen; 27 October 1911; Hanover, Germany
- Died: 7 June 1988 (aged 76); Helsinki, Finland

Paul Yrjö Untamo "Paavo" Hukkinen (27 October 1911 – 7 June 1988) was a German-Finnish actor.

Hukkinen was born in Hanover, Germany, to a German mother and a Finnish father. From 1932 to 1934, he attended the theatre school Suomen Näyttämöopisto in Helsinki, Finland. Hukkinen entered film in 1937 starring in the film Tukkijoella and appeared in some 70 Finnish films and TV series between then and his retirement from acting in 1986.

Hukkinen starred alongside actors Antti Litja, Kauko Helovirta and Markku Huhtamo in the 1977 film Jäniksen vuosi a film about a Finnish man from Helsinki who leaves to find a new life in the wilderness.

His last appearance was in 1986.

Hukkinen died in Helsinki in 1988 aged 76.

== Selected filmography ==
- Miriam (1957)
- Kaks' tavallista Lahtista (1960)
- The Scarlet Dove (1961)
- Jäniksen vuosi (1977)
