= Esa Saario =

Finnish actor (1931–2025)

Esa Matti Saario
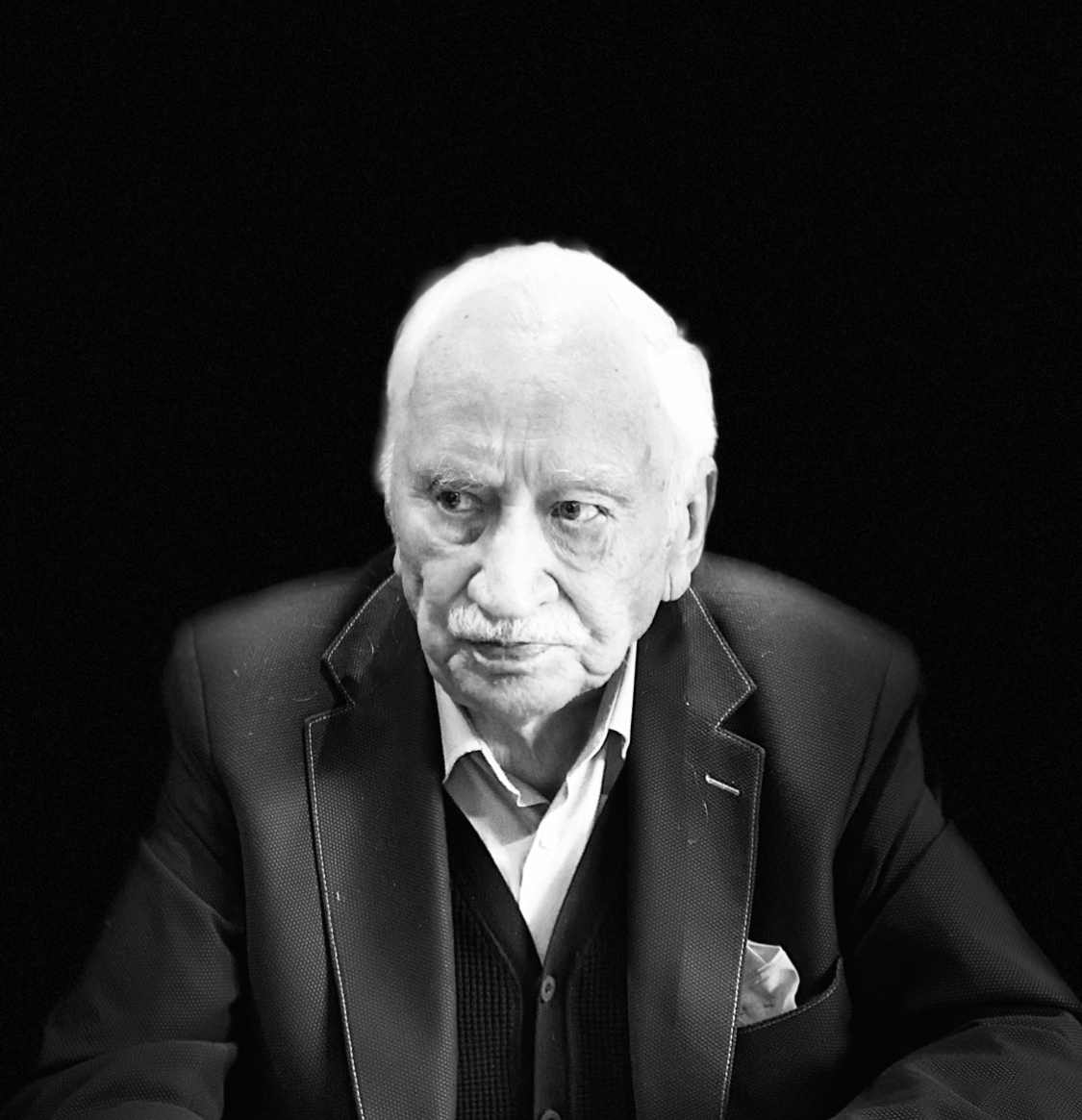
- Saario in 2021
- Born: Esa Matti Saario; 22 November 1931; Nummi, Uusimaa, Finland
- Died: 26 September 2025 (aged 93); Helsinki, Finland
- Education: Helsinki Theatre Academy
- Occupation: Actor
- Years active: 1958–2025
- Spouse: Anja Sisko Tellervo Ahtila
- Children: 1

Esa Saario (22 November 1931 – 26 September 2025) was a Finnish actor whose career spanned more than four decades on stage and screen. He began his studies at the Helsinki Theatre Academy in 1956. Recognizing his exceptional talent, headmaster Wilho Ilmari and the faculty allowed him to skip a full year of training, enabling him to graduate in just two years. Saario joined the Finnish National Theatre in 1956, where he remained until 1997. Over the course of his career, he performed in more than 100 productions at the theatre, taking on roles that ranged from classical interpretations to children’s plays, as well as modern dramas, musical performances, and recitations. His voice also became familiar to audiences through animated films and recordings, cementing his place as a versatile and much-loved figure in Finnish culture.

== Life and career ==
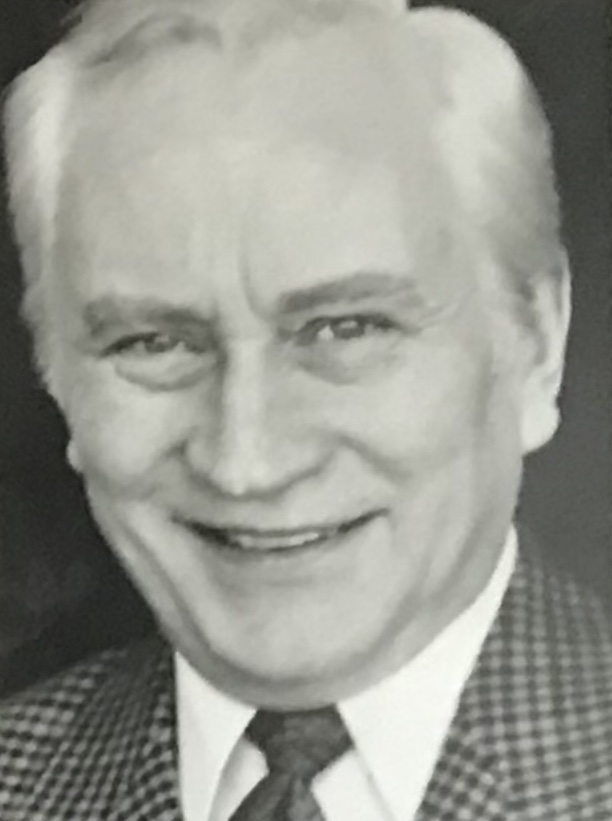
A photograph of Saario when he was younger.

Saario worked as an actor for the Finnish National Theatre from 1958 until his retirement in 1997. The first role he played was in 1954 and the last in 2001. Saario performed in over 200 different roles during his career. Some of his most memorable roles on stage were Orgon in Tartuffe, Malcolm in Macbeth, actor/priest in Hamlet and Amiens in As You Like It.

Saario had also played in multiple radio dramas broadcast by the Finnish National broadcaster Yleisradio. His radio drama roles included Police officer Karhunen (Fin. Poliisi Karhunen) in Noita Nokinenä, Marvin in The Hitchhiker's Guide to the Galaxy and several roles in The Men from the Ministry.

Some of Saario's most famous cinema roles included politician Janne Kivivuori in the movies Here, Beneath the North Star and Akseli and Elina. Saario's first roles on screen were seen in the movies Sven Tuuva the Hero and Kankkulan Kaivolla.

In the beginning of 1960s Saario recorded many children's songs, such as "Hottentottilaulu", together with actress Maikki Länsiö. Hottentottilaulu is originally a Norwegian children's song called Visen om vesle Hoa. It was translated into Finnish by Jukka Virtanen.

Saario had also been a member of the Finnish Actor Union (Finnish: Suomen Näyttelijäliitto, Swedish: Finlands Skådespelarförbund), the Board of the Actors of the Finnish National Theatre and the Board of the Finnish National Theatre. Honorary membership of Nummi-Seura Ry, the local Heritage association in Nummi, was given to Saario on 9 June 2020. The board of Nummi-Seura recognised Saario's significant and long lasting work for Nummi-Seura and for preserving the local heritage in Nummi for future generations.

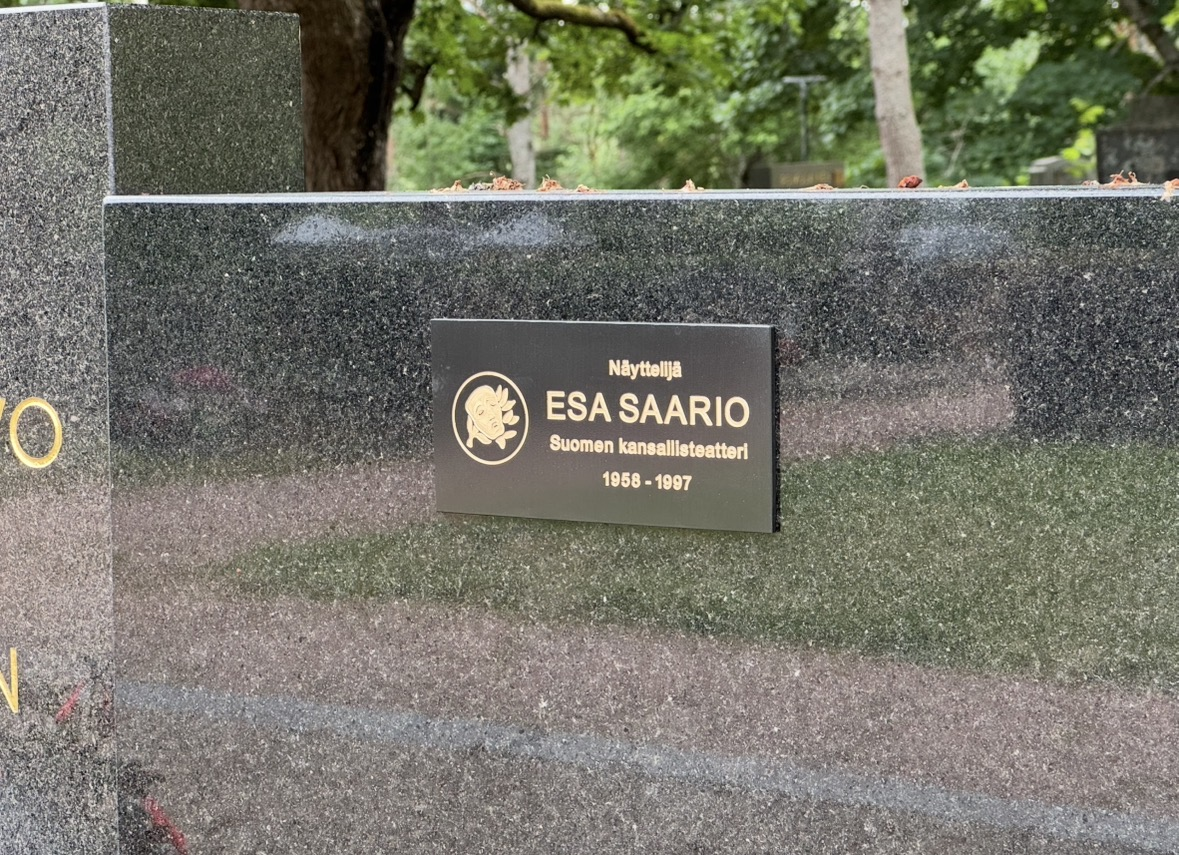
Esa Saario's memorial plaque at Nummi cemetery.

Saario died on 26 September 2025, at the age of 93.

== Theatre ==
Role	Play	Year
One of the wise men	Sleeping Beauty	1954
Fedótik/Rode	Three Sisters	1956
Actor/Priest	Hamlet	1957
Jupp	Captain of Köpenick	1957
I Marquis/I Poet/Soldier	Cyrano de Bergerac	1958
MP of the 3rd Party	Mr. Party Secretary (Fin. Herra Puoluesihteeri)	1958
Jesper	When the Robbers Came to Cardamom Town	1958
Theramenes	Phèdre	1959
IV Citizen/Pindarus	Julius Caesar	1959
Pugovitsyn	The Government Inspector	1959
Sung Ju	Tsu Yuan	1959
I worker	Miljoonavaillinki	1959
Father/Dean	A Dream Play	1959
Naahar	Nilkkarengas	1960
Doctor/General's friend	L'Hurluberlu, ou Le Reactionnaire amoureux	1960
Pedersen	Swedenhjelmit	1960
Herra	Täyttyneiden Toiveiden Maa	1960
Mr. Fauques	Ihana Seikkailu	1960
Don Sancho	Cantar de Mio Cid	1960
Singer/Musician	Suuri Rakkaus	1960
Gardener	Sleeping Beauty	1960
Monsieur Marquis	Der Talisman	1961
Meri-Jussi	Rintatasku	1961
Benvolio	Romeo and Julia	1961
Nicholas Gadspy	A Touch of the Poet	1961
Ruprecht	The Broken Jug	1961
One of the Elders of Argos	Oresteia	1961
Ugo	Narri	1962
Zépo	Pique-nique en campagne	1962
Soldier	Myrskylintu	1962
King	Becket	1962
Sakeus	Lea	1962
Hearse driver	Palanut tontti (Swe. Brända Tomten)	1962
Toivo Uljas	Totuuden Helmi	1962
Old Musician	Caesar and Cleopatra	1963
Juoppi	Naisten Hurmaaja	1963
Mekaanikko	Kaksi Maanantaita	1963
Vincentio	The Taming of the Shrew	1963
Galy Gay	Man Equals Man	1963
Singer/Lyonnaise	Danton's Death	1963
Into Viiriläinen	Tuntematon Potilas	1964
Malcolm	Macbeth	1964
Princess Grace	The Hostage	1964
The Papal Nuncio of Berlin	The Deputy	1964
Caius Caracchus	Muuttohaukat	1965
Mickey	Jälkeen syntiinlankeemuksen	1965
Velkavanki	Jokamies	1965
Singer	The Persecution and Assassination of Jean-Paul Marat As Performed by the Inmates of the Asylum of Charenton Under the Direction of Monsieur de Sade	1965
Lawyer	Miss Alice	1965
Pekka	Uudenvuodenyö	1966
Aigisthos	Electra	1966
Chief of the society	Päämajassa	1966
Sparky	Serjeant Musgrave's Dance	1967
Intonen	Herra Johtaja	1967
Matthews/captain Eckert/Wood	the Death of the President	1968
Guard	Antigone	1968
Captain	Agenttilaiva	1968
Johtaja Judas, Koronkiskuri	Omena Putoaa	1968
La Flèche	The Miser	1969
Joas	Lea	1969
Mäntti	Peter Pan	1969
Peter Cauchon/Bishop of Beauvais	Saint Joan	1970
Frans	Nuorempi Veli	1970
Francois	Naistenryöstäjät	1970
Kreivi Hufnagel	Operetti	1971
Oskar	Tales from the Vienna Woods	1971
Vasili Vasiljevitsh Soljonyi	Three sisters	1971
Antoine	Dear Antoine: or, the Love That Failed	1972
Valee	Tukkijoella	1972
Kortesuo	Anna-Liisa	1972
Krouvari	Kristiina	1973
Orgon	Taruffe	1973
Juhani, Niskavuoren isäntä	Niskavuoren Heta	1973
Arje	Miten Kalat Suutelevat	1974
Matti Aaltonen	Puntilan Isäntä ja Hänen renkinsä Matti	1975
Haudy	Sotilaat	1976
Jahvetti	Arkielämää	1976
Glupp/Man with a bowler hat/Revolutionist	Drums in the Night	1977
Count	Les Fausses Confidences	1977
Captain Shotover	Heartbreak House	1978
Törnskjöld	Kanneviskaali Samuel Kröll	1978
Hoviherra Koipelin	Hyrrä	1979
Hurttanen	Mitta Mitasta	1979
Thesleff	Jääkäri Ståhl	1979
Duke of Alba	Don Carlos	1981
The Prospector	The Madwoman of Chaillot	1981
Johan Ludvig Heiberg	Rain snakes (Fin. Kastematojen elämästä) (Swe. Från regnormarnas liv)	1982
Malmberg, Niiles Kustaa, Lapuan apulaispappi	Kolmekymmentä hopearahaa	1982
Jermolinski	Punainen Virta	1983
Anton Tšehov	Tšehov Jaltalla	1983
James Tyrone	Long Day's Journey into Night	1984
Karri	Nummisuutarit	1984
Nikolai	Breaking the Silence	1986
Sheriff Talbott	The Fugutive Kind	1987
Ville	Omena Putoaa	1987
Captain Smollett	Treasure Island	1988
Doctor Bradman	Blithe Spirit	1988
J.K.Paasikivi	Tie Talvisotaan	1989
Hieroja	Särkelä itte	1989
Nimismies	Pohjanmaa	1990
Tsyganov, Michail Nikolajevitsh, engineer	Barbarians	1991
Iisakki Kiukoo	Amerikan Morsian	1992
Grand Duke Aleksandr Mihailovits	Keisarin perhe ja pyhä paholainen	1993
Adjutantti	Presidentin Dementia	1994
Alonso - King of Naples	The Tempest	1995
Kansleri Bestuzev	Katariina Suuri	1996
Aadolf	Tohvelisankarin rouva	1997
Oskari	Mäntyranta se oli	1997
Leo Fairchild	The Lady in the Van	2001

== Filmography ==
=== Film ===
Year	Title	Role
1958	Sven Tuuva the Hero	Jaeger
1960	Ida Aalbergin ja Lauri Kivekkään häät	Leader of the undergraduates´ delegation
1960	Kankkulan kaivolla	Esa Saario, song impressionist
1960	Oho, sanoi Eemeli	the 1st constable
1962	Ihana seikkailu	master Henrik Södersvans
1963	Totuus on armoton	teacher Itkonen
1963	Aamiainen sotakentällä (Pique-nique en campagne)	Zépo
1963	Karuselli	
1964	Jouluvene - Tähtiparaati	
1965	Suuren oppineen Wun päivä	Lao Da
1966	Uusi jäsenkirja	Siponen
1967	Agamemnon	One of the Elders of Argos
1967	Ismo ystävineen	
1967	Kantapaikka	
1968	Kantapaikka	Metellus
1968	Sirkku	
1968	Here, Beneath the North Star	Janne Kivivuori
1969	Oikeamieliset	Boris Annekov
1970	Akseli and Elina	Janne Kivivuori
1971	Kujanjuoksu	Inspector Kurki
1973	Pohjantähti	Janne Kivivuori
1973	Silta kaukaiseen yöhön	Vitas
1973	Meiltähän tämä käy	judge Ketonen
1976	Luottamus	Kullervo Manner
1976	Outo	
1978	Tuntematon ystävä	Computer operator
1978	Amerikan Antti	Priest
1979	Ruskan jälkeen	Paavo Tyni
1983	Akaton Mies	Huhtanen
1984	Niskavuori	Kaarlo Niskavuori
1986	Liian iso keikka	Depot varetaker of HKL
1986	Akallinen mies	Syyskylän Arttu
1987	Farewell, Mr. President (Fin. Jäähyväiset Presidentille)	Inspector Kairamo
1991	Uuno Turhapuro herra Helsingin Herra	valtioneuvoston konttoripäällikkö
1994	The Men from the Ministry (Fin. Knalli ja sateenvarjo)	sir Henry Pitkin

== Books ==
Saario wrote two books about the dialect of Nummi. In addition to telling about the Nummi dialect, the first book also tells about the poets and songwriters of the past in Nummi. The first book is called Nummilaist kiälentampaamist. Saario's second book, Sana on jalkava -se menee pian ja pitkält, is a dictionary between words that are only used in Nummi dialect and words in standard Finnish language. A short booklet was also written by Saario to add more words to the second book. The booklet is called Ei lisä pahitteeks ol, paitti velas ja selkään saamises.

The books were published by Esa Saario and Nummi-Seura, the Association of Nummi Local Area.

Title	Publishing year and place	Pages
Nummilaist Kiälentampaamist	2013, Nummi	115
Sana on jalkava -se menee pian ja pitkält	2016, Nummi	134
Ei lisä pahitteeks ol, paitti velas ja selkään saamises	2016, Nummi	16

== Voice acting ==
Year	Film/Series	Role
1976	The Twelve Tasks of Asterix	Julius Caesar/Panoramix
1982	Snow White and the Seven Dwarfs	Magic Mirror
1984	Lady and the Tramp	Jock
	Lady and the Tramp II: Scamp's Adventure	Jock
1985–1991	Disney's Adventures of the Gummi Bears (series)	King Gregor
1988	Oliver & Company	Bill Sykes
1988	Dino-Riders (series)	
1988-1993	Count Duckula	Igor/narrator
1989, 1999	The Little Mermaid	King Triton
1990–1991	TaleSpin (series)	Shere Khan
1991	Beauty and the Beast	Narrator
1991–1992	Darkwing Duck (series)	Taurus Bulba
1992	Batman (series)	Commissioner Gordon/Dr. Bartholomew/Karl Rossum
1993	The Sword in the Stone	sir Ector/Narrator
1993	The Jungle Book	Shere Khan
1993	Batman: Mask of the Phantasm	Carl Beaumont/James Gordon
1994	The Lion King	Mufasa
1994	Snow White and the Seven Dwarfs	Narrator
1994	The Aristocats	Napoleon/Toulouse/Cyril/Edgar
1995	Babe	Narrator
1995	Sleeping Beauty	Narrator/King Hubert
1995	One Hundred and One Dalmatians	Danny/Ara
1996	Santa Claus and the Magic Drum	Santa Claus
1996–1998	Jungle Cubs (series)	adult Shere Khan
1997	Hercules	Zeus
1997	Flubber	Chester
1997	Moomins and The Magician's Hat (Swe. Mumintrollen Jakten på Trollkarlens rubin)	The Magician
1998	Babe: Pig in the City	Narrator
1998	The Black Cauldron	Narrator/Dallben
1998	Batman & Mr. Freeze: SubZero	James Gordon
1998	The Batman/Superman Movie: World's Finest	Perry White/James Gordon/Ceasar Carlini
2000	Dinosaur	Yar
2000	The Little Mermaid II: Return to the Sea	King Triton
2000	102 Dalmatians	Dr. Pavlov/the judge
2001	Atlantis: The Lost Empire	King Kashekim Nedakh
2001	Monsters, Inc.	Henry J. Waternoose III
2001	Monsters, Inc. Scream Team	Henry J. Waternoose III
2002	Peter Pan: Return to Never Land	Narrator
2002	Treasure Planet	Billy Bones
2002	The Cat Returns	Narrator
2003	The Jungle Book 2	Shere Khan
2004	Home on the Range	Sheriff Sam Brown
2007	Röllin sydän	Narrator/The village elder/sauna bath spirit
