= Hirvisaari =

Hirvisaari is a Finnish surname. Notable people with the surname include:

- James Hirvisaari (born 1960), Finnish politician
- Laila Hirvisaari (1938–2021), Finnish writer
