= Sleeping Beauty (1949 film) =

1949 film directed by Edvin Laine

- Original Finnish film poster.
- Directed by: Edvin Laine
- Written by: Toivo Kauppinen
- Produced by: T. J. Särkkä
- Starring: Tuula Usva; Aarne Laine; Mirjam Novero
- Cinematography: Kalle Peronkoski
- Edited by: Armas Vallasvuo
- Music by: Erkki Melartin; Heikki Aaltoila
- Release date: 1949
- Running time: 99 minutes
- Country: Finland
- Language: Finnish

Sleeping Beauty (Finnish: Prinsessa Ruusunen) is a Finnish family fantasy film made in 1949, directed by Edvin Laine and produced by T. J. Särkkä. Tuula Usva plays the titular role, the king is played by the director's brother Aarne Laine and the queen by the director's wife Mirjam Novero. The film is based on Sleeping Beauty by the Brothers Grimm and also the play written by Zachris Topelius based on the Grimm's fairy tale.

Leo Lehto won the 1949 Jussi Awards category of the best scenery.
