= Hottentot =

Hottentot may refer to:

== Language ==
- Hottentot (racial term), in English
- Khoekhoe language
- Khoisan language

== Peoples ==
- Griqua people
- Khoekhoe, a South African ethnic group
- Khoisan, a wider group including the Khoikhoi

== Arts and entertainment ==
- The Hottentot (1922 film)
- The Hottentot, a 1929 film
- Hottentottilaulu ("The Hottentot Song"), a Finnish song
- Hottentot Venus, one of two Khoikhoi women exhibited as freak-show attractions

== Life forms ==
- Hottentot (fish), a sea bream species
- Africanis, a landrace of dog
- Carpobrotus edulis, or hottentot-fig
- Dioscorea elephantipes, or hottentot bread
- Trachyandra, or hottentot cabbage
- Blue-billed teal, a duck species
- Hottentotta, a scorpion genus

== Organisations ==
- Cape Corps, formerly Hottentot Corps, a South African army unit
- Terre Haute Hottentots, a baseball team
