= Jean-Marie Winling =

French actor

- Born: 1947 (age 77–78); Sète, France
- Occupation: Actor
- Years active: 1972–present

Jean-Marie Winling (born 1947) is a French actor. He has appeared in more than a hundred films since 1972.

== Filmography ==
Year	Title	Role	Director	Notes
1972	Le grillon du foyer	Edouard	Jean-Paul Carrère	TV movie
1974	Dada au coeur	Young Max	Claude Accursi	
1989	Mieux vaut courir	Alex	Élisabeth Rappeneau	TV movie
1989	Liberté, Libertés	Maitre Jean	Jean-Dominique de La Rochefoucauld	TV movie
1990	Cyrano de Bergerac	Lignière	Jean-Paul Rappeneau	
1990	Trois années	Gregoire	Fabrice Cazeneuve	
1991	Netchaïev est de retour	Lacourt	Jacques Deray	
1991	Un coeur qui bat	Jean	François Dupeyron	
1991	La maison vide	Father Marc	Denys Granier-Deferre	TV movie
1991	Le dernier lien	Vincent	Joyce Buñuel	TV movie
1992	La grande collection	The father	Gérard Vergez	TV series (1 episode)
1992	Nestor Burma	Noah Berenson / Nikos Birikos	Joyce Buñuel (2)	TV series (1 episode)
1993	Le nombril du monde	Chatel	Ariel Zeitoun	
1993	Un crime	The advocate general	Jacques Deray (2)	
1993	Les yeux de Cécile	Émile Chambron	Jean-Pierre Denis	TV movie
1993	Julie Lescaut	Balat	Josée Dayan	TV series (1 episode)
1993	L'instit	Bernard Chevalier	Jean-Louis Bertucelli	TV series (1 episode)
1993	Le JAP, juge d'application des peines	Pollack	Josée Dayan (2)	TV series (1 episode)
1993	Rocca	Abel	Bernard Dumont	TV series (1 episode)
1993	Antoine Rives, juge du terrorisme	Hubert de Beaujour	Gilles Béhat	TV series (1 episode)
1993	Regards d'enfance	Pierre	Olivier Langlois	TV series (1 episode)
1994	Flics de choc : Le dernier baroud	Bamenco	Henri Helman	TV movie
1994	Chasseur de loups	The minister	Didier Albert	TV movie
1994	Deux justiciers dans la ville	Guyot	Gérard Marx	TV series (1 episode)
1994	Novacek	Commissioner Sigurel	Marco Pico	TV series (1 episode)
1995	The Horseman on the Roof	Alexandre Petit	Jean-Paul Rappeneau (2)	
1995	Les Milles	Chief Medical Garraud	Sébastien Grall	
1995	Le petit garçon	The dark man	Pierre Granier-Deferre	
1995	J'aime beaucoup ce que vous faites	Bernard	Xavier Giannoli	Short
1995	La duchesse de Langeais		Jean-Daniel Verhaeghe	TV movie
1995	Le R.I.F.	Jean-Louis Barnier	Marco Pico (2)	TV series (1 episode)
1995	L'histoire du samedi	Professor Romieux	Alain Schwartzstein	TV series (1 episode)
1996	Saint-Exupéry : La dernière mission	Gavoille	Robert Enrico	TV movie
1996	Docteur Sylvestre	Edmond Blanchard	Christiane Lehérissey	TV series (1 episode)
1997	Ni vue ni connue	Francis Cheilan	Pierre Lary	TV movie
1997	Les arnaqueuses	Savane	Thierry Binisti	TV movie
1997	Sud lointain	Lucien Gannerac	Thierry Chabert	TV mini-series
1998	Paparazzi	Franck's boss	Alain Berbérian	
1998	Ça ne se refuse pas	Joe Amico	Eric Woreth	
1998	L'interview	Jacques	Xavier Giannoli (2)	Short
1998	Le dernier bip	Betrand Joubert	Laetitia Colombani	Short
1998	D'or et de safran	Wang Zao	Marco Pico (3)	TV movie
1998	Louise et les marchés	Bernard Richard	Marc Rivière	TV mini-series
1999	Belle maman	Henri	Gabriel Aghion	
1999	Le schpountz	The professor	Gérard Oury	
1999	One 4 All	The banker	Claude Lelouch	
1999	Mes amis	Guichard	Michel Hazanavicius	
1999	Mort d'un conquérant	Aloïs Slim	Thierry Chabert (2)	TV movie
1999	Pepe Carvalho	Martin Gausachs	Merzak Allouache	TV series (1 episode)
1999	Mission protection rapprochée	Professor Desjardin	Dennis Berry	TV series (1 episode)
1999	L'histoire du samedi	Verdier	Michel Vianey	TV series (1 episode)
1999	Vérité oblige	Lionel Keller	Claude-Michel Rome	TV series (1 episode)
2000	To Matthieu	Factory's owner	Xavier Beauvois	
2000	Total western	The colonel	Éric Rochant	
2000	Le prof	The director	Alexandre Jardin	
2000	La vie commune	Jean-Pierre	Antony Cordier	Short
2000	Bérénice	Paulin	Jean-Daniel Verhaeghe (2)	TV movie
2000	Josephine, Guardian Angel	Germon	Philippe Monnier	TV series (1 episode)
2000	Commissaire Moulin	Simon-Grangier	Gilles Béhat (2)	TV series (1 episode)
2001	Les morsures de l'aube	Abraham von Bulow	Antoine de Caunes	
2001	Les enquêtes d'Éloïse Rome	Richard Webber	Denys Granier-Deferre (2)	TV series (1 episode)
2001	Vertiges	Lieutenant Alvez	Laurent Carcélès	TV series (1 episode)
2001-02	Avocats & associés	Arthur Bornstein	Pascal Chaumeil & Alexandre Pidoux	TV series (4 episodes)
2002	Monsieur Batignole	Sacha Guitry	Gérard Jugnot	
2002	Dégustation	The blouse man	Eric Valette	Short
2002	Avis de tempête	The weather man	Nicolas Alberny	Short
2002	Fabio Montale	Philippe Auch	José Pinheiro	TV mini-series
2002	Navarro	Bellini	Patrick Jamain	TV series (1 episode)
2002	Marion Jourdan	Christian Leroy	Paul Planchon	TV series (1 episode)
2003	Mauvais esprit	Doctor Edouard	Patrick Alessandrin	
2003	Le prix de l'honneur	General Doucet	Gérard Marx (2)	TV movie
2003	Le voyage de la grande-duchesse	Pierre	Joyce Buñuel (3)	TV movie
2003	Le grand patron	Sam Leenhardt	Emmanuel Gust	TV series (1 episode)
2004	Pellis		Yann Gozlan	Short
2004	Penn sardines	M. Grivaut	Marc Rivière (2)	TV movie
2004	Femmes de loi	Lucas Vérone	Denis Malleval	TV series (1 episode)
2004	Les Cordier, juge et flic	Joseph Neubourg	Jean-Marc Seban	TV series (1 episode)
2005	Burnt Out	Bruner	Fabienne Godet	
2005	I Saw Ben Barka Get Killed	Pierre Lemarchand	Serge Le Péron & Saïd Smihi	
2005	Le proc	Ferrand	Klaus Biedermann	TV series (1 episode)
2005	Josephine, Guardian Angel	Levasseur	Philippe Monnier (2)	TV series (1 episode)
2006	Comedy of Power	The man of power	Claude Chabrol	
2006	Le Lièvre de Vatanen	General Robson	Marc Rivière (3)	
2006	Petits meurtres en famille	Monsieur Paul	Edwin Baily	TV mini-series
2006	Commissaire Moulin	Laroche	Jean-Luc Breitenstein	TV series (1 episode)
2006	Central nuit	Monsieur Devalterre	Pascale Dallet	TV series (1 episode)
2007	Love Songs	Julie's father	Christophe Honoré	
2007	A Girl Cut in Two	Gérard Briançon	Claude Chabrol (2)	
2007	La Vie d'artiste	The publisher	Marc Fitoussi	
2007	La lance de la destinée	Walter B	Dennis Berry (2)	TV mini-series
2007	La prophétie d'Avignon	Henri Esperanza	David Delrieux	TV mini-series
2008	Manhunt	General Charon	Laurent Jaoui	TV movie
2008	Une enfance volée	Monseigneur Gerlier	Fabrice Genestal	TV movie
2008	Terre de lumière	Georges Reignier	Stéphane Kurc	TV mini-series
2008	Le silence de l'épervier	Sarrot	Dominique Ladoge	TV mini-series
2008-13	Nicolas Le Floch	Monsieur de Noblecourt	Nicolas Picard, Philippe Bérenger & Edwin Baily (2)	TV series (9 episodes)
2009	Une affaire d'état	Macquart	Eric Valette (2)	
2009	Adieu De Gaulle adieu	Jacques Foccart	Laurent Herbiet	TV movie
2009	Palizzi	Bellone	Serge Hazanavicius	TV series (1 episode)
2010	Sans laisser de traces	Maurice	Grégoire Vigneron	
2010	La fonte des glaces	The father	Julien Lacheray & Stéphane Raymond	Short
2011	The Prey	Robert Pascaud	Eric Valette (3)	
2011	Amoureuse	Montaigne	Nicolas Herdt	TV movie
2011	Commissaire Magellan	Cedric Waringer	Étienne Dhaene	TV series (1 episode)
2012	Alyah	The father	Elie Wajeman	
2012	Les mains de Roxana	Bernard Christiansen	Philippe Setbon	TV movie
2012	Chambre 327	Louis Marsac	Benoît d'Aubert	TV mini-series
2012	Les Petits Meurtres d'Agatha Christie	Pierre Fougères	Renaud Bertrand	TV series (1 episode)
2013	Je fais le mort	Michel Beauchatel	Jean-Paul Salomé	
2013	Le juge est une femme	Jean-Louis Roussel	Laurent Lévy	TV series (1 episode)
2014	De guerre lasse	Titoune	Olivier Panchot	
2014	Simiocratie	Louis XV	Nicolas Pleskof	Short
2014	The law of Barbara	Lawyer Solal	Didier Le Pêcheur	TV movie
2015	Families	Lawyer Vouriot	Jean-Paul Rappeneau (3)	
2015	Falco	Charles Pommard	Marwen Abdallah	TV series (1 episode)
2016	La Mécanique de l'ombre	Philippe Chalamont	Thomas Kruithof	
2016	L'affaire de Maître Lefort	Jacques Demange	Jacques Malaterre	TV movie
2016	Duel au soleil	Enzo Castelli	Didier Le Pêcheur (2)	TV series (1 episode)
2016	Marseille	Edmond d'Abrantes	Florent Emilio Siri & Thomas Gilou	TV series (3 episodes)
2017	Back to Burgundy	Anselme	Cédric Klapisch	
2017	Custody	Joël	Xavier Legrand	
2017	Promise at Dawn		Éric Barbier	
2017	Alex Hugo	Jules Hugo	Olivier Langlois (2)	TV series (1 episode)
2017	Transferts	Alexandre Syrmay	Olivier Guignard, Antoine Charreyron	TV series (1 episode)

== Theater ==
Year	Title	Author	Director
1972	Le Château	Franz Kafka	Daniel Mesguich
1972	Légendes à venir	Mehmet Ulusoy	Mehmet Ulusoy
1973	Le Nuage amoureux	Nâzım Hikmet	Mehmet Ulusoy (2)
1975	La Sensibilité frémissante	Pierre Macris	Jean-Marie Winling
1976	Life of Galileo	Bertolt Brecht	Arlette Téphany
1976	Dans les eaux glacées du calcul égoïste	Mehmet Ulusoy	Mehmet Ulusoy (3)
1977	Hedda Gabler	Henrik Ibsen	Claude Risac
1977	Agua Quemada	Carlos Fuentes	Claude Risac (2)
1978	La Manifestation	Philippe Madral	Jacques Rosner
1979	Genseric	Jean-Marie Winling	Jean-Marie Winling (2)
1980	Berenice	Jean Racine	Antoine Vitez
1980	Mourning Becomes Electra	Eugene O'Neill	Stuart Seide
1980	Un dimanche indécis dans la vie d'Anna	Jacques Lassalle	Jacques Lassalle
1982	Macbeth	William Shakespeare	Pierre Étienne Heymann
1982	Entretien avec M. Saïd Hammadi, ouvrier algérien	Tahar Ben Jelloun	Antoine Vitez (2)
1982	Hippolyte	Robert Garnier	Antoine Vitez (3)
1983	Hamlet	William Shakespeare	Antoine Vitez (4)
1984	The Seagull	Anton Chekhov	Antoine Vitez (5)
1984	Le Héron	Vassili Axionov	Antoine Vitez (6)
1985	Lucrezia Borgia	Victor Hugo	Antoine Vitez (7)
1986-87	Ni chair, ni poisson	Franz Xaver Kroetz	Gilles Chavassieux
1987	The Satin Slipper	Paul Claudel	Antoine Vitez (8)
1988	La Fausse Suivante	Pierre de Marivaux	Éric Sadin
1988	Les Apprentis Sorciers	Lars Kleberg	Antoine Vitez (9)
1990	Le Livre de Christophe Colomb	Paul Claudel	Pierre Barrat
1991	Calamity Jane	Jean-Noël Fenwick	Jacques Rosny
1996	La Parisienne	Henry Becque	Jean-Louis Benoit
1999	Les Portes du ciel	Jacques Attali	Stéphane Hillel
2001	L’Échange	Paul Claudel	Jean-Pierre Vincent
2002	La Part du lion	Wladimir Yordanoff	Jacques Rosner (2)
2003	Hamlet	William Shakespeare	Moshe Leiser and Patrice Caurier
2004	Ivanov	Anton Chekhov	Alain Françon
2005	Hedda Gabler	Henrik Ibsen	Éric Lacascade
2008-09	Ordet	Kaj Munk	Arthur Nauzyciel
2009	Rosmersholm	Henrik Ibsen	Stéphane Braunschweig
2011	Ithaka	Botho Strauß	Jean-Louis Martinelli
2011	Adagio [Mitterrand, le secret et la mort]	Olivier Py	Olivier Py
2012	Britannicus	Jean Racine	Jean-Louis Martinelli (2)
2013	The Wild Duck	Henrik Ibsen	Stéphane Braunschweig (2)
2015	King Lear	William Shakespeare	Olivier Py (2)
2016-17	L'Avaleur	Jerry Sterner	Robin Renucci
