= Veikko Sinisalo =

Finnish actor (1926–2003)

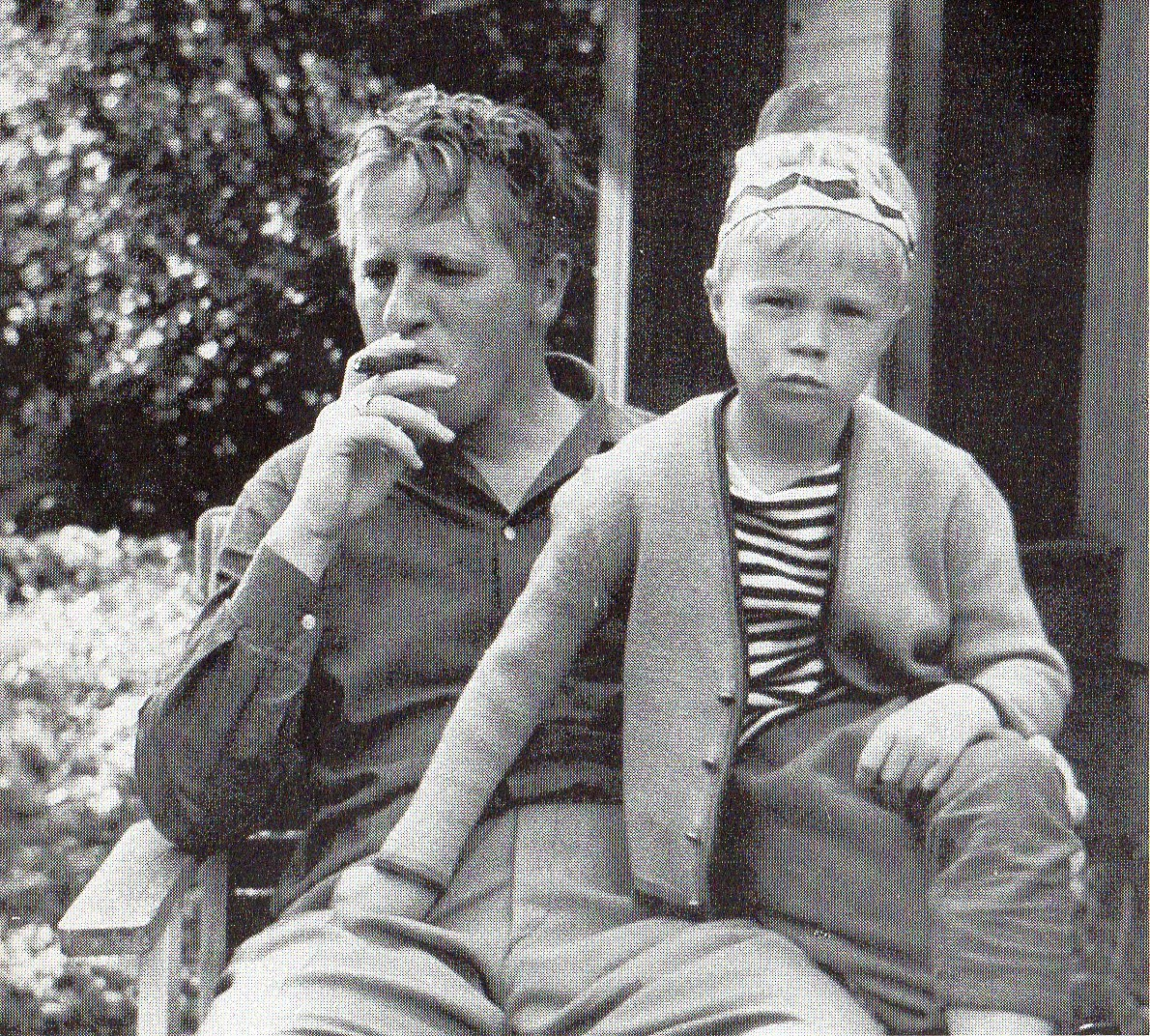
- Sinisalo (left) in 1961
- Born: 30 September 1926; Riihimäki, Finland
- Died: 16 December 2003 (aged 77); Tampere, Finland
- Occupation: Actor
- Years active: 1954–2002

Veikko Sinisalo (30 September 1926 – 16 December 2003) was a Finnish actor. He appeared in 24 films and television shows between 1954 and 2002. He starred in Sven Tuuva the Hero, which was entered into the 9th Berlin International Film Festival.

Veikko Sinisalo's father was the politician Väinö Sinisalo. He was the grandfather of the professional footballer Viljami Sinisalo.

== Filmography ==
| Year | Title | Role | Notes |
|---|---|---|---|
| 1951 | St. John's Wort and Tinkerbell | | |
| 1954 | Opri | Kylänpoika | |
| 1955 | The Unknown Soldier | Lahtinen | |
| 1957 | Black Love | Unto Eskola | |
| 1958 | Murheenkryynin poika | Heikki Hemminki Aaltonen | |
| 1958 | Sven Tuuva the Hero | Sven Tuuva | |
| 1967 | Nutty Finland | Suohullu Pähkä | |
| 1968 | About Seven Brothers | Takku | |
| 1968 | Here, Beneath the North Star | Anttoo Laurila | |
| 1969 | Näköradiomiehen ihmeelliset siekailut | Poliisi | |
| 1969 | North scraps | Suohullu Pähkä | |
| 1973 | North Star | | TV film |
| 1973 | Concrete Miller | | TV film |
| 2001 | The Life of Aleksis Kivi | Eerikki Stenvall | |
