= Petka =

Petka may refer to:

- Pětka or Committee of Five, a Czechoslovak organization
- Petka, Iran, a village in Mazandaran Province, Iran
- Saint Petka, an ascetic female saint from the Eastern Roman Empire
- Petka (Požarevac), a village in Serbia
- Petka, Lazarevac, a suburb of Lazarevac, Belgrade, Serbia
- Edward Petka, American attorney and politician
- Pyotr Isaev, Soviet commander, Vasily Chapaev's aide
- TV Pětka, Czech television channel
