= Golden Light (film) =

- Finnish: Kultainen kynttilänjalka
- Directed by: Edvin Laine
- Written by: Toivo Kauppinen
- Produced by: Yrjö Norta
- Starring: Edvin Laine; Mirjam Novero; Rauha Puntti
- Cinematography: Esko Töyri
- Edited by: Yrjö Norta
- Music by: Heikki Aaltoila
- Production company: Fenno-Filmi
- Release date: 4 October 1946
- Running time: 110 minutes
- Country: Finland
- Language: Finnish

Golden Light (Finnish: Kultainen kynttilänjalka) is a 1946 Finnish crime film directed by Edvin Laine and starring Laine, his wife Mirjam Novero, and Rauha Puntti.

== Partial cast ==
- Edvin Laine as Markus Mäntylä
- Mirjam Novero as Asta Kataja
- Rauha Puntti as Ulla Karpela
- Esko Saha as Lauri Takala
- Jalmari Rinne as Kataja
- Hilja Jorma as Hilda Kataja
- Matti Aulos as Takala
- Emma Väänänen as Mrs. Takala
- Kaarlo Saarnio as Silmäpuoli-Mäntylä
- Mirjami Kuosmanen as Erna
- Enni Rekola as Fanny
- Paavo Jännes as Karpela
- Verna Piponius as Stiina
- Laina Laine as Adele
- Anni Hämäläinen as Hedvig
- Artturi Laakso as Helmer
