= Reino Paasilinna =

Finnish politician (1939–2022)

Reino Paasilinna MEP
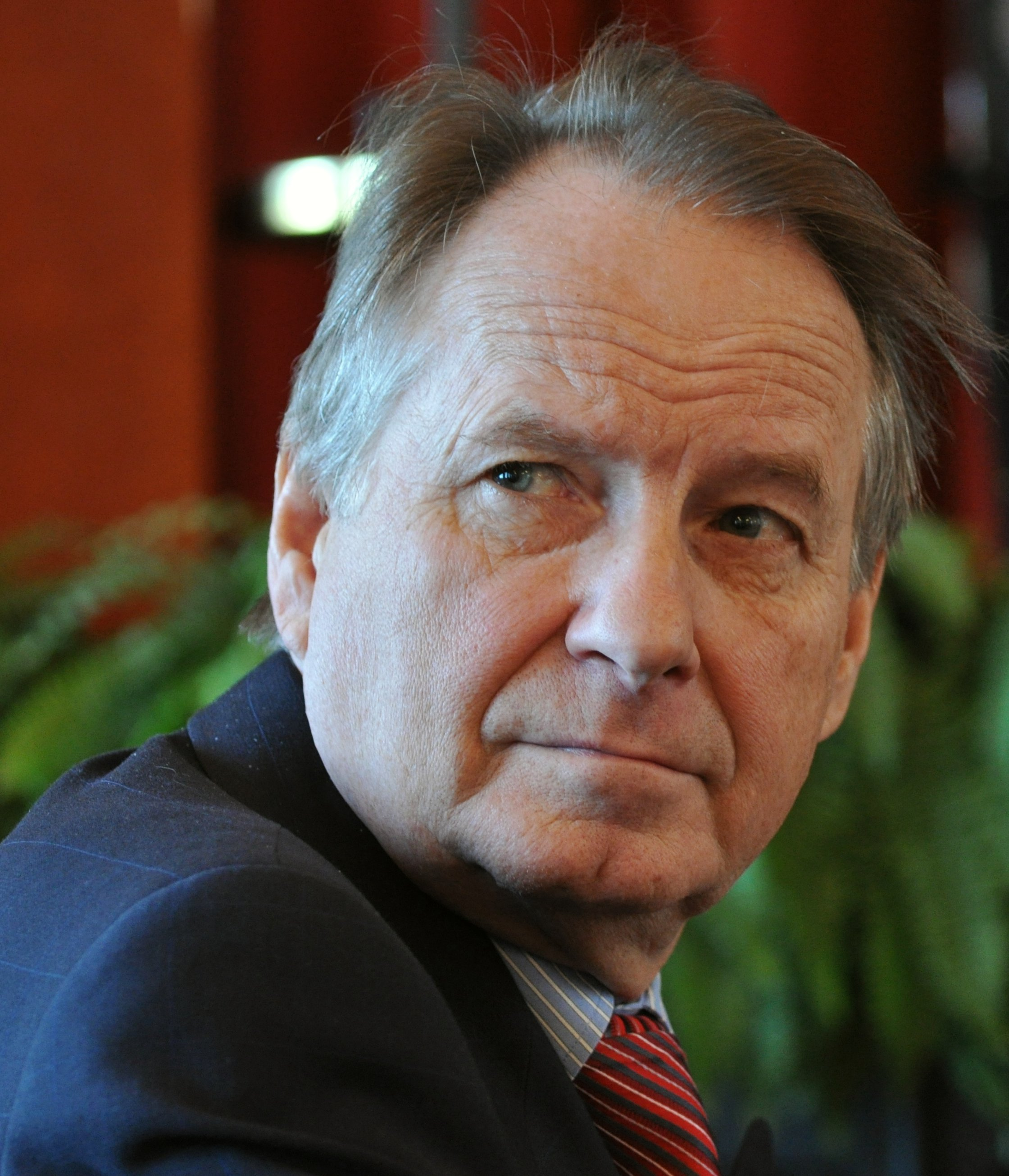

Member of the European Parliament
- In office 1996–2009

Personal details
- Born: 5 December 1939 Arctic Ocean
- Died: 21 July 2022 (aged 82) Helsinki, Finland

Reino Paasilinna (5 December 1939 – 21 July 2022) was a Finnish politician who served as a Member of the European Parliament (MEP). He was a member of the Social Democratic Party of Finland, which is part of the Party of European Socialdemocrats. He was in the European Parliament from 1996 to 2009, and sat on the Parliament's Committee on Industry, Research and Energy.

He was also a substitute for the Committee on Culture and Education, vice-chair of the delegation to the EU–Russia Parliamentary Cooperation Committee, and a substitute for the delegation for relations with the countries of Central America.

== Early life and education ==
Reino Paasilinna was born on Aunus, a ship on the Arctic Ocean, on the coast of Norway, where the Paasilinna family fled during the Winter War. His family is from Petsamo but they moved to Kittilä because the Soviet Union invaded Petsamo during the Winter War. The writers Erno, Mauri and Arto Paasilinna were his brothers.

He earned a Master's degree in social sciences (1974), a postgraduate degree in social sciences (1989) and a doctorate in social sciences (1995).

== Career ==
- TV journalist, director and editor (1961–1974)
- Chairman, Union of Radio and Television Journalists (1967–1969)
- Press secretary and adviser at Finnish embassies in Moscow and Washington, D.C. (1974–1983)
- Member, Inter-Parliamentary Union (IPU) (1983–1989)
- Member of Parliament (1983–1989 and 1995–1996)
- Member of the board and Vice-chairman of Elisa Communications (1988–2002)
- Director-General (last) and Chairman of Yleisradio (1990–1994)
- Vice-chairman, International Radio and Television Organisation and Vice-chairman, European Broadcasting Union (1992–1994)
- Chairman, Board of Governors of Euronews (1992–1994)
- Vice-chairman, Committee on the Future (1995–1996)
- Member of Finland's delegation to the Council of Europe (1995–1996)
- Member of the European Parliament (1996-2009)
- Member, Helsinki City Council (1998–1999)
- Chairman, PSE Group Working Party on the Information Society (1998-2022)

== Awards ==
- Commander of the Order of the Lion of Finland (1995)
