= The Year of the Hare (novel) =

1975 book by Arto Paasilinna

- Cover of the first Finnish edition
- Author: Arto Paasilinna
- Original title: Jäniksen vuosi
- Translator: Herbert Lomas
- Language: Finnish
- Publisher: Weilin+Göös
- Publication date: 1975
- Publication place: Finland
- English publication date: March 1995
- Media type: Print (Hardcover)
- Pages: 182
- ISBN: 951-35-1252-5
- OCLC: 2195299

The Year of the Hare (Finnish: Jäniksen vuosi) is a 1975 picaresque novel by Finnish author Arto Paasilinna.

The novel has been translated into 29 languages including English, Bulgarian, Chinese, Croatian, Czech, Dutch, Estonian, French, German, Hebrew, Hungarian, Italian, Japanese, Korean, Rumanian, Russian, Serbian, Slovenian, Swedish, Turkish, and Ukrainian. It is Paasilinna's most widely read work, and was included in 1994 in the UNESCO Collection of Representative Works which funded the 1995 English translation by Herbert Lomas. It was adapted twice into feature films: a 1977 Finnish film called The Year of the Hare, and a 2006 French film directed by Marc Rivière called Le Lièvre de Vatanen.

== Plot ==
It tells the story of Kaarlo Vatanen, a frustrated journalist, who, after nearly killing a hare with his car, turns away from an unhappy and unwholesome life. On an impulse, Vatanen abruptly abandons his urban lifestyle, job, and wife, in exchange for the freedom of the road and the wilderness, living off his cash savings and casual employment, all the time accompanied by the hare which he has nursed back to health and kept as a pet. A year of unlikely encounters and adventures ensues, during the course of which Vatanen repeatedly runs afoul of the law and conventional mores but manages to stay afloat thanks to the help and understanding of other sympathetic free spirits.
