= Aliyah (2012 film) =

2012 film

- Film poster
- Directed by: Elie Wajeman
- Written by: Gaëlle Macé; Elie Wajeman
- Produced by: Lola Gans
- Starring: Adele Haenel, Cédric Kahn
- Cinematography: David Chizallet
- Distributed by: Rézo Films (France), Film Movement (USA)
- Release date: May 2012 (Cannes)
- Running time: 90 minutes
- Country: France
- Languages: French, Hebrew
- Budget: $1.8 million
- Box office: $275.000

Aliyah (French: Alyah) is a 2012 French drama film directed by Elie Wajeman.

== Plot ==
Alex, a 27-year-old Jewish drug dealer who lives in Paris, plans to do his Aliyah and move to Israel for the chance of a better life. His brother, Isaac, keeps pestering him for money. During the course of a Shabbat dinner at their aunt's house, we learn they lack parental support. Alex's desire to move to Israel is not so much grown out of Zionism, but because nothing holds him back in France, in spite of his recent encounter with a gentile girl, Jeanne. The final scene highlights Israel's multicultural culture.

== Cast ==
- Pio Marmaï as Alex Raphaelson
- Cédric Kahn as Isaac Raphaelson
- Adèle Haenel as Jeanne
- Guillaume Gouix as Mathias
- Sarah Lepicard as Esther
- David Geselson as Nathan
- Olivier Desautel as Polo
- Jean-Marie Winling as The father
- Mar Sodupe as Anaëlle
- Aimé Vaucher as Gabriel
- Bertrand Constant as Claude
- Marion Picard as Rébecca
- Brigitte Jaques-Wajeman as The aunt
- Louise Roch as Lucie
- Zohar Wexler as Nadav
- Michaël Abiteboul as The shaliah

== Reception ==
The film was screened in the Directors' Fortnight section at the 2012 Cannes Film Festival. It was also shown at the 2012 Haifa International Film Festival and the Cabourg Film Festival.

Variety reviewed the film favorably, suggesting the cast was "solid." and that the film deserve a "wider audience" than "Francophone arthouses and Jewish fests". For Les Echos, it is "the best French film in a long time", as it shows many social classes in Paris, and admits the fact that Paris, as pretty as it is, has nothing left to offer.
