= Aarno Sulkanen =

Finnish actor

- Born: 1 April 1940 (age 86); Lahti, Finland
- Occupation: Actor
- Years active: 1968-present

Aarno Sulkanen (born 1 April 1940) is a Finnish actor. He has appeared in more than 70 films and television shows since 1968. He was married to a Finnish actress, Marjatta Raita.

== Selected filmography ==
- Here, Beneath the North Star (1968)
- Aksel and Elina (1970)
- Uuno Turhapuro's Memory Slowly Comes Back (1983)
- The Winter War (1989)
- A Charming Mass Suicide (2000)
