= The Howling Miller =

1981 novel by Arto Paasilinna

- First edition (Finnish)
- Author: Arto Paasilinna
- Original title: Ulvova mylläri
- Translator: Will Hobson from the French of Anne Colin du Terrail
- Language: Finnish
- Publisher: WSOY
- Publication date: 1981
- Publication place: Finland
- English publication date: 2007
- Media type: Print (Paperback)
- Pages: 236

The Howling Miller (Finnish: Ulvova mylläri) is a 1981 novel by the Finnish author Arto Paasilinna.

The protagonist of the story, which is set in Finnish Lapland around 1950, is a man by the name of Gunnar Huttunen, who settles in a small village to mend and run a derelict mill. Huttunen is an enterprising and resourceful man, a hard worker, proudly independent but generally good-natured. However, his peculiar personality, particularly his habit of howling to vent his emotions, turns the intolerant villagers and authorities against him, and he is eventually committed into a mental hospital. After escaping, Huttunen lives as a fugitive in the wilderness, aided by his few friends: his lover Sanelma, the local police constable Portimo, and the postman and moonshiner Piittisjärvi. After a final confrontation with the law, Huttunen disappears, never to be heard from again.

The book has been translated into several languages. It has twice been adapted into a feature film: a Finnish one called Ulvova mylläri (1982) and a French one, Cornélius, le meunier hurlant (2017). It was also adapted as a graphic novel by French comics artist Nicolas Dumontheuil.
