= La reine et le cardinal =

2009 television film directed by Marc Rivière

La Reine et le Cardinal is a 2009 French television film directed by Marc Rivière and starring Alessandra Martines and Philippe Torreton in the title roles. It is based on events in the early years of the reign of Louis XIV of France. The drama of the rumored love affair between the child king's widowed mother, Anne of Austria, and her prime minister, Cardinal Mazarin, unfolds as intrigue and political discord ignite the Fronde. The second part of the film covers the romance between Louis XIV and Mazarin's niece, Marie Mancini and ends with the death of Mazarin. It has been broadcast in two parts which lasted for over three hours. Marc Rivière won a best director award at the La Rochelle TV festival for this production.

== Synopsis ==
Upon the death of Cardinal Richelieu, King Louis XIII appoints Cardinal Mazarin as First Minister and godfather to the child dauphin. The queen, Anne d'Autriche, seeing in Mazarin a continuation of the policies of Richelieu to whom she was opposed, eventually allowed herself to be won over by his diplomacy and charm. Becoming regent on the death of the king, she made him her First Minister and advisor to the regent. Their collusion extends beyond politics to a secret liaison.

The tax burden created by Mazarin makes him unpopular and quickly confronted by the Fronde, forcing him to take refuge with the royal family at Saint-Germain-en-Laye. He is opposed by the Prince de Condé who, risking royal wrath, takes the side of the Fronde against the cardinal.

The second half of the telefilm opens with Mazarin's exile with his sister and nieces at the Augustusburg and Falkenlust Palaces, Brühl from where he continues to observe state affairs. After the coronation of Louis XIV, he is able finally to return to France and be reunited with the queen, with whom he had continued in correspondence. His niece Marie Mancini and the young king fall in love, but the exigences of the state over-rule them. Mazarin removes Marie from court and organises a marriage between the young king and the infanta of Spain, Maria Theresa of Spain. Mazarin died having overseen the progression of France towards an absolute monarchy.

== Cast ==
- Philippe Torreton: Cardinal Mazarin
- Alessandra Martines: Anne d'Autriche
- Nicolas Vaude: le Jean François Paul de Gondi
- Marc Citti: Jeure
- Cyril Descours: Louis XIV
- Carla Buttarazzi: Marie Mancini
- Joséphine de Meaux: Madame de Motteville
- Christophe Reymond: Gaston d’Orléans
- Audrey Fleurot: la duchesse de Longueville
- Rudi Rosenberg: le prince de Condé, ex-duc d’Enghien
- Xavier de Guillebon: La Rochefoucauld
- Samuel Theis: Beaufort
- Philippe du Janerand: Louis XIII
- Geoffroy Thiebaut: Villeroy
- Jean Dell: Gaspar de Guzmán, Count-Duke of Olivares, ambassadeur d'Espagne
- Laurent Claret: Henri II, Prince of Condé
- Sylvie Degryse: Princesse de Condé
- Barbara Probst: Olympe Mancini
- Sylvie David: Geronima Mazzarini
- Bernard Valais: Pierre Séguier
- Rufus: Cardinal Richelieu
- Franck de La Personne: Colbert
