= Markku Huhtamo =

Finnish actor (born 1946)

- Born: 10 August 1946 (age 79); Rovaniemi, Finland
- Children: Zan Huhtamo

Markku Huhtamo (born 10 August 1946, in Rovaniemi, Finland) is a Finnish actor.

== Career ==
Huhtamo entered film in 1977 and has appeared in over 30 Finnish films and TV series between then and the present although mostly in film.

Huhtamo starred in the 1977 film alongside actors Antti Litja and Kauko Helovirta in Jäniksen vuosi a film about a Finnish man from Helsinki who leaves to find a new life in the wilderness.

In 1978, he appeared as private Kumpulainen in The Guarded Village 1944 (Finnish: Vartioitu kylä 1944).

His last appearance was in 2005 in Lapaus.

For videogames, he has given the Finnish voice to Master Eon, a major character in the Skylanders reboot series of the Spyro the Dragon franchise.
