= Erno Paasilinna =

Finnish writer and journalist

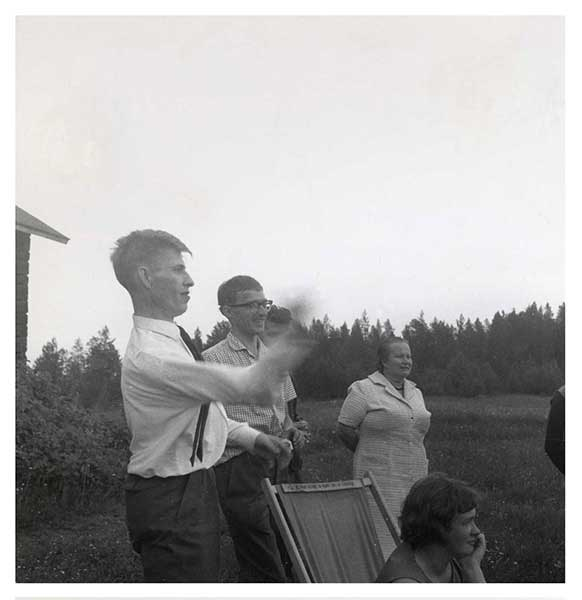
Erno-Paasilinna-1963.jpg

Erno Paasilinna (14 March 1935, in Petsamo – 30 September 2000, in Tampere) was a Finnish writer and journalist. He received several literary prizes, the most notable being the Finlandia Prize in 1984 for his collection of essays Yksinäisyys ja uhma ("Loneliness and Defiance"). His works have been translated into Estonian, Hungarian, Swedish, Norwegian, Russian and Latvian.

Erno Paasilinna has been titled the "national cynic laureate" and "official state critic" due to his uncompromising views and lack of admiration for his human fellows. His incisive analysis of power and the powerful shook the fundaments of Finnish society, but were widely recognized to be impartial, swiping those ideologically close to his heart as heavily as those whose ideology was diametrically opposed to his own.

The writers Mauri and Arto Paasilinna are his brothers, as well as politician Reino Paasilinna.
