= Year of the Rabbit (disambiguation) =

Year of the Rabbit is a year in the Chinese zodiac.

Year of the Rabbit may also refer to:

- Year of the Rabbit (band), a rock band assembled and fronted by Ken Andrews
  - Year of the Rabbit (album), 2003
- Year of the Rabbit (ballet), a ballet choreographed by Justin Peck to music from Sufjan Stevens's album, Enjoy Your Rabbit
- Year of the Rabbit (TV series), a British television sitcom
