= Elämä lyhyt, Rytkönen pitkä =

1991 novel by Arto Paasilinna

First edition (publ. WSOY)

Elämä lyhyt, Rytkönen pitkä ("Life short, Rytkönen long") is a 1991 Finnish novel by Arto Paasilinna, While farcical throughout, from the title's twist on the original saying onwards, it has a somewhat elegiac mood, with a constant undercurrent of tragedy leavened by humor. A film adaptation of the novel by Ere Kokkonen was released in 1996. The film features many well-known Finnish actors, including Santeri Kinnunen as Seppo Sorjonen and Liisa Roine.

== Plot ==
Seppo Sorjonen, a young cab driver/wage slave fed up with his lifestyle, and Taavetti Rytkönen, an old retired war veteran, standing in the middle of a road with a thick wad of bills in his pocket, trying to remember who he is and how he got there, meet by chance. Rytkönen hires Sorjonen as his driver and the two people go on a leisurely, low-drama road trip through Finland.
