= Hottentottilaulu =

1961 song performed by Maikki Länsiö

Hottentottilaulu (Finnish for "The Hottentot song") is a Finnish language version of the song Visen om vesle Hoa written by the Norwegian songwriter-author Thorbjørn Egner. The song was translated to Finnish by Jukka Virtanen and the music was composed by Olli Heikkilä.

== Song ==
The song is about a Hottentot boy Huua Kotti, "black as soot", living in Africa along the Chickadua river.

Asui kerran Afrikassa Chickadua-joella, pikkupoika Huua Kotti musta kuin pesty noella. Ei ollut puettu Kallen tavoin, kulki melkein paljain navoin. Siten kulki Huua Kotti, hän oli oikea hottentotti.

Once upon a time there lived a small boy Huua Kotti in Africa along the Chickadua river, black as if washed with soot. He was not dressed like Kalle, he went almost with his belly button bare. So went Huua Kotti, he was a real Hottentot.

The song was first published in 1961, when it was performed by Maikki Länsiö and Esa Saario. Later recordings of the song have been made by Vesa-Matti Loiri, Markku Suominen, Veltto Virtanen and Tuomari Nurmio, among others.

According to the Helsinki City Library, the Hottentots are portrayed in the song as happy, childlike and harmless fairytale characters. The details describing the tribe's habits and living conditions are largely fictitious, for example the names are fictitious and bamboo, mentioned in the song, grows mainly in Asia. The song has been viewed as misleading or downright derogatory.

== Controversy ==
In March 2010 the song caused controversy, when Member of the Parliament of Finland Pertti "Veltto" Virtanen performed the Hottentottilaulu on a True Finns party cruise. The cruise hostess interrupted Virtanen's performance, as it was viewed as racist. Virtanen later accused the cruise hostess who had interrupted him of "racism". Later, Viking Line announced that the reason for the interruption had been Virtanen's derogatory and tactless comments about the other passengers.
