= Mirjam Novero =

Finnish actress (1915–1996)

- Born: 24 May 1915; Tampere, Grand Duchy of Finland
- Died: 14 January 1996 (aged 80)
- Other name: Mirjam Novero-Laine
- Occupation: Actress
- Years active: 1946–1970 (film)

Mirjam Novero (1915–1996) was a Finnish film actress. She was the wife of the director Edvin Laine, who directed many of the notable films she starred in, including the five films named below.

== Selected filmography ==
Year	Title	Role	Notes
1946	Golden Light	Asta Kataja	
1957	Niskavuori taistelee	Ilona Niskavuori	
1958	Sven Tuuva the Hero	Rva Duncker	
1968	Here, Beneath the North Star	Anna Kivivuori	
1970	Akseli and Elina	Anna Kivivuori	

== Bibliography ==
- Soila, Tytti. The Cinema of Scandinavia. Wallflower Press, 2005.
