= The Year of the Hare (2006 film) =

- French theatrical release poster
- French: Le Lièvre de Vatanen
- Directed by: Marc Rivière
- Written by: Marc Rivière
- Based on: The Year of the Hare by Arto Paasilinna
- Produced by: Marc Rivière
- Starring: Christopher Lambert
- Cinematography: Stefan Ivanov
- Edited by: Frédéric Fichefet
- Music by: Goran Bregović
- Production company: Gaumont
- Distributed by: Gaumont Columbia TriStar Films (France); Belga Films (Belgium)
- Release date: 27 December 2006
- Running time: 95 minutes
- Countries: France; Belgium; Bulgaria
- Language: French
- Budget: $8.8 million

The Year of the Hare (French: Le Lièvre de Vatanen) is a 2006 French, Belgian and Bulgarian film directed, written and produced by Marc Rivière. It is based on the 1975 novel The Year of the Hare by Arto Paasilinna, which has previously been made of a 1977 Finnish adaptation directed by Risto Jarva.

== Cast ==
- Christopher Lambert : Tom Vatanen
- Julie Gayet : Olga
- Rémy Girard : Richard Growe
- François Morel : The pastor
- Johan Leysen : Peter
- Eric Godon : Sam Bougreau
- Jean-Marie Winling : General Robson
- Dominique Besnehard : Barman Chibougamau
- Jean-Louis Sbille : Aaron

== See also ==
- The Year of the Hare, the novel by Arto Paasilinna the film is based on.
- The Year of the Hare, the 1977 Finnish adaptation of the novel.
