= Under the North Star trilogy =

1959–1962 trilogy by Finnish author Väinö Linna

Under the North Star
- All three volumes of English translated trilogy.
- Vol I: Under the North Star; Vol II: The Uprising; Vol III: Reconciliation
- Author: Väinö Linna
- Original title: Täällä Pohjantähden alla
- Translator: Richard Impola
- Country: Finland
- Language: Finnish
- Publisher: WSOY
- Published: 1959 (Vol I); 1960 (Vol II); 1962 (Vol III)
- Published in English: 2001–2003
- No. of books: 3

Under the North Star (Finnish: Täällä Pohjantähden alla) is a trilogy published between 1959 and 1962 by Väinö Linna, Finnish author and former soldier who fought in the Continuation War (1941–44). The novel follows the life of a Finnish family from 1880, through the First World War, the Finnish Civil War and the Second World War, to about 1950. Through the lives of ordinary people, it describes the clash of ideals in Finland's language strife and the struggle between the Whites (nationalists) and the Reds (bolsheviks) in the movement to Independence and Civil War.

Based on the work, several film adaptations have been made. Two of them were directed by Edvin Laine: the 1968 film Here, Beneath the North Star (based on the first and second volumes of trilogy) and its 1970 sequel Akseli and Elina (based on the third and final volume). The two films were compiled into a single one North Star in 1973. In 2009 and 2010, Timo Koivusalo directed a film duology of the story.

The novel shares one main character, Akseli Koskela, and through his son Vilho Koskela covers some of the same events as Linna's 1954 novel The Unknown Soldier, which is considered the author's magnum opus.

== Plot summaries ==
=== Vol. I: Under the North Star ===
"In the beginning there were the swamp, the hoe – and Jussi", the book starts, when the story opens with Jussi, a farm hand from Häme, clearing marshland to create a croft, which will later be called Koskela. In the first part of the book tension mounts between crofters and land owners in the village of Pentinkulma. Jussi's son Akseli becomes an active socialist. At the same time the upper classes are concerned with language strife and Finland's relationship with Russia.

=== Vol. II: The Uprising ===
In the second part the Finnish Civil War breaks out. The book describes the atrocities committed on both sides, as well as the tensions which lead up to them. The war hits Koskela harshly, for the family loses two sons.

=== Vol. III: Reconciliation ===
In the third part the community is dominated by the Whites, the victors of the Civil War. In Koskela, however, matters improve as crofters are liberated and Koskela becomes an independent farm. Things turn for the worse at the outbreak of the Second World War. Again Koskela pays a heavy price, losing three sons: Vilho, Eero and Voitto. The last chapters of the book concentrate on the reconciliatory atmosphere created by the joint hardships endured during the war.

== Characters ==
- Akseli Koskela, platoon leader in the Red Guard, later a farmer
- Elina Koskela, Akseli's wife
- Johannes "Jussi" Koskela, Akseli's father, tenant of the vicarage
- Alma Koskela, Akseli's mother and Jussi's wife
- Aleksis "Aleksi" Koskela, Akseli's brother, Jussi and Alma's second son
- August "Aku" Koskela, Akseli and Aleksi's brother, Jussi and Alma's third son
- Adolf "Aatu" Halme, village tailor
- Lauri Salpakari, the local vicar and landlord of the Koskela Family, né Lars Stenbom
- Ellen Salpakari, Vicar Salpakari's wife, a conservative politician
- Otto Kivivuori, tenant farmer, Elina's father
- Anna Kivivuori, Otto's wife, Elina's mother
- Janne Kivivuori, Otto and Anna's eldest son, mason, socialist politician
- Oskari "Osku" Kivivuori, Otto and Anna's youngest son, member of the Red Guard
- Anton "Anttoo" Laurila, tenant farmer
- Uuno Laurila, Anttoo's son, member of the Red Guard
- Elma Laurila, Anttoo's daughter, Akusti's fiancée
- Kalle Töyry, master of the Töyry House, landlord of the Laurila Family
- Artturi Yllö, judge and wealthy landowner
- Antero Mellola, very fat saw-mill owner
- Preeti Leppänen, tenant farmer
- Aune Leppänen, Preeti's daughter
- The Baron, owner of the Manor, landlord of the Leppänen Family
- The Baroness, The Baron's wife
- The Wolf-Kustaa, hunter and tramp

== Impact ==
First edition of first book in trilogy from 1959.

The book is considered a classic in Finland with print runs into hundreds of thousands. Even most of those who have not read the book are familiar with the iconic opening words "Alussa olivat suo, kuokka — ja Jussi" ("In the beginning there were the bog, the hoe — and Jussi"). It is a reference to two verses from the Bible, the opening sentence of the creation account, “In the beginning God created the heaven and the earth,” and the opening sentence of the Gospel of John, “In the beginning was the Word”.

The second book in the trilogy, The Uprising, generated considerable controversy over its portrayal of the Finnish Civil War because, for the first time, a novel was published that was sympathetic (in human terms, if not politically) towards the Reds. Up until then, all history of the Finnish Civil War had been written by the Whites. Under the North Star played a crucial role in starting a discussion in Finland over what really happened in 1918 and in healing decades-old wounds between the two factions.

== Translations ==
Under the North Star has been translated into English by Richard Impola:

- Vol. 1 Under the North Star, pub. 2001, ISBN 0-9685881-6-6
- Vol. 2 Under the North Star 2: The Uprising, pub. 2002, ISBN 0-9685881-7-4
- Vol. 3 Under the North Star 3: Reconciliation, pub. 2003, ISBN 0-9685881-8-2

Unfortunately these translated publications contain many typographical errors.

== See also ==
- Akseli and Elina
- Here, Beneath the North Star
- Edvin Laine
- Finnish Civil War
- History of Finland
- The Unknown Soldier (1955 film)
- The Unknown Soldier (novel)
- Väinö Linna
