= Akseli and Elina =

1970 film directed by Edvin Laine

- Original Finnish poster
- Directed by: Edvin Laine
- Written by: Väinö Linna; Edvin Laine
- Produced by: Mauno Mäkelä
- Starring: Aarno Sulkanen
- Cinematography: Olavi Tuomi
- Release date: 4 December 1970
- Running time: 137 minutes
- Country: Finland
- Language: Finnish

Akseli and Elina (Finnish: Akseli ja Elina) is a 1970 Finnish drama film directed by Edvin Laine. It was entered into the 7th Moscow International Film Festival. The film is based on the third and final volume of Väinö Linna's novel trilogy Under the North Star. It's a sequel to the 1968 film Here, Beneath the North Star, which was based on the two first volumes of the trilogy.

The film shares only one main character, Akseli Koskela, with its prequel.

After the end of the Finnish Civil War, the crofters' farm, also named Koskela, is liberated and life improves for the crofters. However, the outbreak of the Second World War brings new calamities and Akseli Koskela loses three sons: Vilho, Eero and Voitto. The shared hardships endured during the war is shown to lead to a reconciliatory atmosphere.

== Cast ==
- Aarno Sulkanen as Akseli Koskela
- Ulla Eklund as Elina Koskela
- Risto Taulo as Jussi Koskela
- Anja Pohjola as Alma Koskela
- Mirjam Novero as Anna Kivivuori
- Kauko Helovirta as Otto Kivivuori
- Esa Saario as Janne Kivivuori
- Rose-Marie Precht as Ellen Salpakari
- Matti Ranin as Lauri Salpakari
- Maija-Leena Soinne as Aune Leppänen
- Jussi Jurkka as Siukola

Violinist Linda Lampenius appeared in the film at only eleven weeks of age.
