= Here, Beneath the North Star =

1968 film directed by Edvin Laine

- Original Finnish film poster
- Directed by: Edvin Laine
- Written by: Matti Kassila >Edvin Laine; Väinö Linna
- Produced by: Mauno Mäkelä
- Starring: Aarno Sulkanen
- Cinematography: Olavi Tuomi
- Release dates: 13 September 1968 (Finland); September 1973 (United States)
- Running time: 182 minutes
- Country: Finland
- Language: Finnish
- Budget: FIM 2.6 million

Here, Beneath the North Star (Under the Northern Star in the US release; Finnish: Täällä Pohjantähden alla) is a 1968 Finnish drama film directed by Edvin Laine. The film is based on the first two volumes of Väinö Linna's novel trilogy Under the North Star. The third volume was adapted into a film two years later under the title Akseli and Elina. With a budget of approximately FIM 2.6 million (approximately $500,000), the film was one of the most expensive Finnish films of its time, and one of the first in which the Finnish Broadcasting Company (YLE) participated in the production costs.

The film was entered into the 6th Moscow International Film Festival in 1969. The film was first released in the United States in September 1973; at the time, Paul Gardner of The New York Times described the film as "a Finnish version of Gone with the Wind".

== Plot ==
The film begins with the founding of the Koskela croft in the 1880s and tells the story of the life of the people of the fictional Pentinkulma village until about 1920. The central theme is the unstable position of crofters and their goal to improve their living conditions. The rural upper class, such as the priestly family, and the poor people, whose socio-economic status is weaker than that of crofters, also play an important role. The story of the film goes all the way to the end of the Finnish Civil War between the Red Guards (Crofters) and the Whites (Government). The battle scene depicts the Battle of Syrjäntaka.

== Cast ==
- Aarno Sulkanen as Akseli Koskela
- Titta Karakorpi as Elina Koskela
- Risto Taulo as Jussi Koskela
- Anja Pohjola as Alma Koskela
- Eero Keskitalo as Aleksi Koskela
- Paavo Pentikäinen as Aku Koskela
- Kauko Helovirta as Otto Kivivuori
- Mirjam Novero as Anna Kivivuori
- Esa Saario as Janne Kivivuori
- Pekka Autiovuori as Oskari Kivivuori
- Kalevi Kahra as Adolf Halme
- Asta Backman as Emma Halme
- Rose-Marie Precht as Ellen Salpakari
- Matti Ranin as Lauri Salpakari
