= Väinö Linna =

Finnish author (1920–1992)

Väinö Valtteri Linna
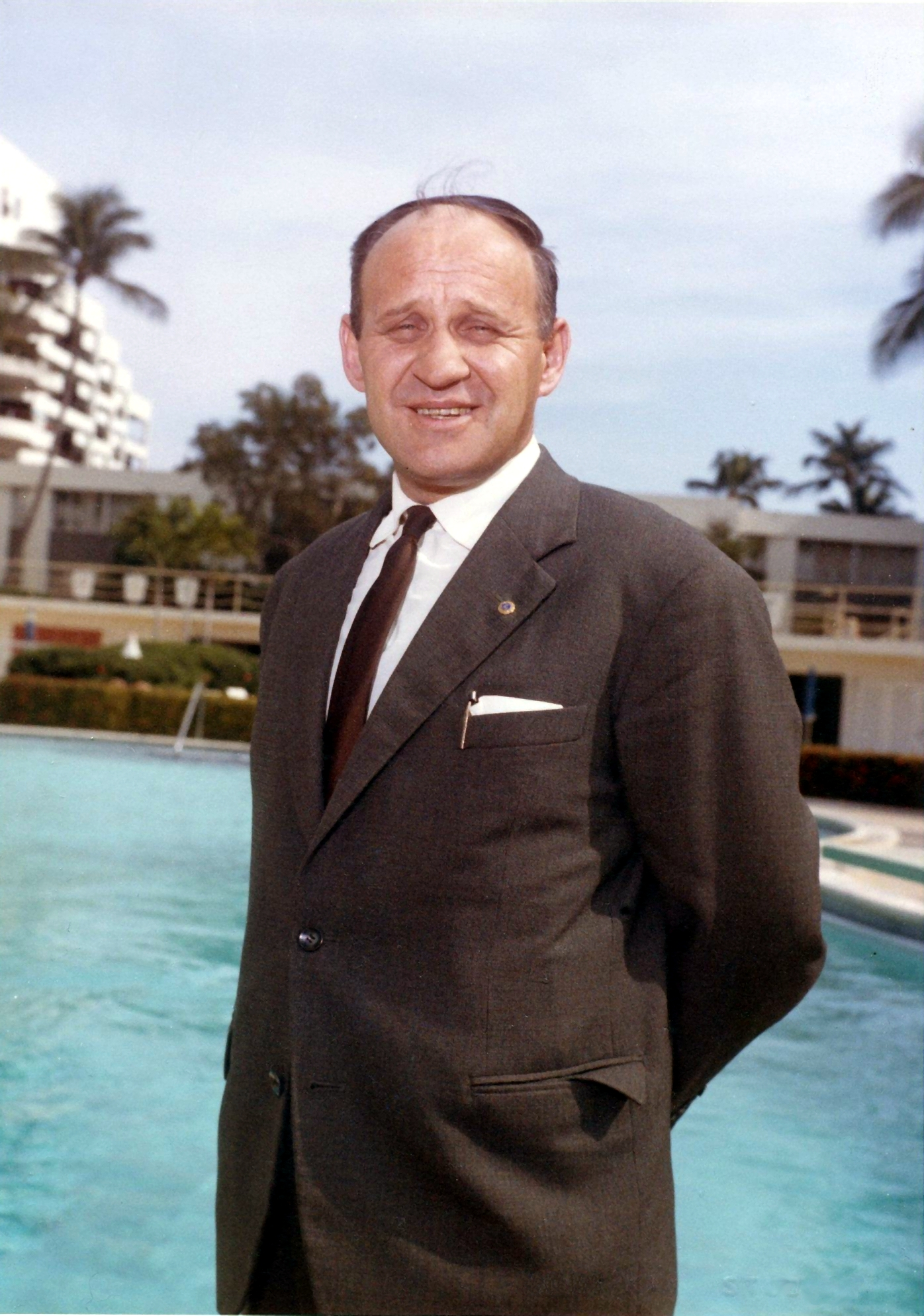
- Väinö Linna at Palm Beach, Florida, on a trip to the United States, in March 1963.
- Born: 20 December 1920; Urjala, Finland
- Died: 21 April 1992 (aged 71); Tampere, Finland
- Occupation: Author
- Writing career
- Notable works: The Unknown Soldier; Under the North Star trilogy

Väinö Valtteri Linna (pronounced [ˈʋæi̯nø ˈlinːɑ]; 20 December 1920 – 21 April 1992) was a Finnish author and a former soldier who fought in the Continuation War (1941–44). Linna gained literary fame with his third novel, Tuntematon sotilas (The Unknown Soldier, published in 1954), and consolidated his position with the trilogy Täällä Pohjantähden alla (Under the North Star, published in 1959–1963 and translated into English by Richard Impola). Both have been adapted to a film format on several occasions; The Unknown Soldier was first adapted into a film in 1955 and Under the North Star in 1968 as Here, Beneath the North Star, both directed by Edvin Laine.

== Biography ==
Väinö Linna was born in Urjala in the Pirkanmaa region. He was the seventh child of Viktor (Vihtori) Linna (1874–1928) and Johanna Maria (Maija) Linna (née Nyman) (1888–1972). Linna's father, a butcher, died when Linna was only seven years old, thus Linna's mother had to support the entire family by working at a nearby manor. Despite his background, Linna's interest in literature began early on. As a child, Linna loved adventure novels which he borrowed from the local library. The author's education was, however, limited to six years at a public school which he finished in the mid-1930s. After working as a lumberjack and a farm hand at the same manor where his mother had worked, Linna moved to Tampere in 1938. Typical of his generation, the adolescent author-to-be moved from the countryside to a developing city in search of industrial labour which he found at the Finlayson textile mills as a fitter; he would work there from 1938 to 1940 and, after his military service, from 1944 until 1954.

In 1940, Linna was conscripted into the army. The Second World War had broken out, and for Linna's part it meant participation in the Continuation War (1941–44). He fought on the eastern front. In addition to being a squad-leader, he wrote notes and observations about his and his unit's experiences. Already at this point Linna knew that writing would be his preferred occupation. However, failure to get the notes published led him to burn them. In spite of rejection, the idea of a novel, which would depict ordinary soldiers' views on war, would later lead him to write The Unknown Soldier.

After the war, Linna got married and started writing while working at the mills during the day. Throughout his time at Finlayson, Väinö Linna read avidly. Such authors as Schopenhauer, Dostoyevsky, and Nietzsche gained Linna's respect. Linna later said that Erich Maria Remarque's All Quiet on the Western Front had also had a great influence on him. However, Linna's first two novels Päämäärä and Musta rakkaus sold poorly, though Musta rakkaus did earn him the City of Tampere literary prize in 1948; he also wrote poetry but did not enjoy success with that either. Not until the release of The Unknown Soldier (1954) did he rise to fame. It is evident that at the time there was a distinct social need for a novel that would deal with the war and ordinary people's role in it. A decade after the peace treaty with the Soviet Union many Finns were ready to reminisce, some even in a critical manner. The Unknown Soldier satisfied that need completely, as its characters were unarguably more diverse, realistic yet heroic, than those of earlier Finnish war novels. The book soon became something of a best-seller, as it sold 175,000 copies in only six months – quite a lot for a Finnish novel in the 1950s.

Early on, the reception of the book was harsh. In Finland's biggest newspaper, Helsingin Sanomat, the critic Toini Havu argued in her review that Linna did not present his characters in a grand historical and ethical context, which she thought was crucial. Also modernists treated The Unknown Soldier with contempt. At the time Tuomas Anhava referred to The Unknown Soldier as a "boy's book" because of its action-packed storyline. Acceptance by the general public was enough to counter the negative criticism in the end. The novel is now considered both a classic in Finnish literature and a part of the national legacy.

In the mid-1950s, he moved to Hämeenkyrö and began to cultivate crops. In 1959, the first part of Under the North Star was released. The book was a success and other parts were to follow. The second part was published in 1960 and the final part in 1963. The third part of the novel was honoured with the Nordic Council's Literature Prize. Other accolades from this period included the Johannes Linnankoski Prize in 1958, the Aleksis Kivi Prize in 1960, and the State Prize for Literature in 1960 and 1961. During this time, Linna was also a member of the board of the Pirkkalaiskirjailijat, the regional authors' association, from 1957 to 1969. In 1964, Linna sold the farm and moved back to Tampere. This time he did not return to Finlayson, as he now could dedicate his life entirely to literature due to the financial success his works had earned him. He was given the honorary title of academician in 1980, having previously received an honorary doctorate from the University of Tampere in 1965 and been made an honorary member of the Finnish Writers' Union in 1970, despite the fact that he had no higher education.

In 1984, Väinö Linna had a stroke, which caused him to lose the ability to speak. Some time after that, he was diagnosed with cancer, which tired him out, leading to his death on 21 April 1992.

== Literary works ==
- 1947: Päämäärä
- 1948: Musta rakkaus
- 1949–53: Messias (unfinished)
- 1954) Tuntematon sotilas, The Unknown Soldier
- 1959–62: Täällä Pohjantähden alla I–III, Under the North Star, translated by Richard Impola
- 1967: Oheisia', a collection of essays and speeches
- 1990: Murroksia
- 2000: Sotaromaani, uncensored version of The Unknown Soldier

== Legacy ==
Linna's realism of his work has had a profound influence on Finnish social, political and cultural life. His novels have a place in Finland's literary canon, among Kalevala, Seven Brothers and other classics. Many quotations from his works are nowadays Finnish sayings. The opening line of Under the North Star, "In the beginning there were the swamp, the hoe – and Jussi", is recognized by most Finns as well as Rokka's famous exclamation, "Where do you need a real good man, here you have one!", from The Unknown Soldier. Showcasing the value of his legacy, Linna was pictured on the 20 markka banknote which was in use from 1993 to the introduction of the Euro. In addition, both of his major works have been filmed multiple times.

In 1995, a square of the same name was named after Väinö Linna in Tampere.
