= Kauko Helovirta =

Finnish actor

Kauko Helovirta.
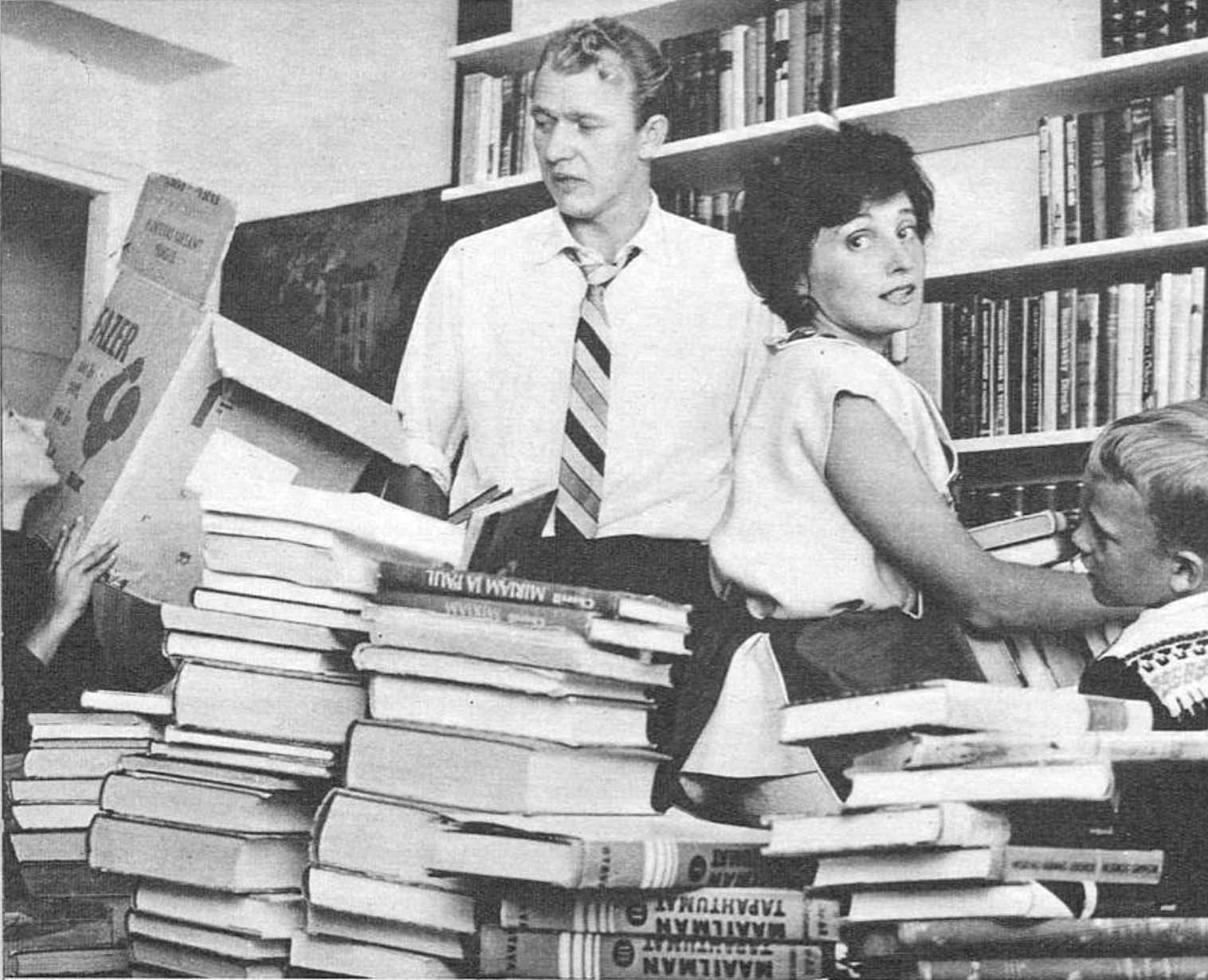
- Born: 21 October 1924; Juupajoki, Finland
- Died: 13 September 1997 (aged 72); Helsinki, Finland

Kauko Kustaa Helovirta (Hellström, 21 October 1924 – 13 September 1997, Helsinki, Finland) was a Finnish film actor.

== Biography ==
Helovirta was born in Juupajoki, and started his acting career in 1950. He made about 40 Finnish-language films between then and 1995.

Helovirta starred in the 1977 film Jäniksen vuosi, a film about a man from Helsinki who leaves to find a new life in the wilderness, alongside actor Antti Litja.

Towards the end of his career in the mid-1990s he appeared on television.

He died in Helsinki.

== Selected filmography ==
Year	Title	Role	Notes
1958	Sven Tuuva the Hero	Duncker	
1962	The Boys	Capt. Fritz Mayer	
1968	Here, Beneath the North Star	Otto Kivivuori	
1970	Aksel and Elina	Otto Kivivuori	
1977	The Year of the Hare	Police Officer	
1980	Borrowing Matchsticks	Lieutenant Torvelaynen	
1984	Hunters of the Night	Police Inspector Topi	
1992	Back to the USSR	White Guard Commander	
