= UNESCO Collection of Representative Works =

UNESCO translation project

The UNESCO Collection of Representative Works (or UNESCO Catalogue of Representative Works) was a UNESCO translation project that was active for about 57 years, from 1948 to about 2005. The project's purpose was to translate masterpieces of world literature, primarily from a lesser known language into a more international language such as English and French. As of 2000 there were about 1,300 works in the catalog representing over one hundred different literatures and representing around fifty Asian languages, twenty European languages as well as a number of literatures and languages from Africa and Oceania. It also sponsored the translation of some works between two less widespread languages, such as the translation of the Japanese writer Yasunari Kawabata into Indonesian (in addition to eight other languages), or the Urdu poet Faiz Ahmed Faiz into Hungarian (in addition to two other languages). UNESCO financed the translations and publications, but UNESCO itself was not a publisher, instead working with other publishers who then sold the books independently.

Works were selected based on a number of criteria. Generally, new versions of translations already published were not undertaken and it was rare for a little-known contemporary author with only a small output to their name to be considered for inclusion. Works were selected by the following procedure. Member States suggested lists of works which they consider to be representative of the values of their cultures. Internationally recognized cultural organizations, such as the PEN federation of writers and the International Council for Philosophy and Human Sciences were also called upon for advice in the establishment of the lists. In addition, suggestions were received from publishers who were willing to undertake the translation of particular works which they consider worthy of a place in the Collection.

As of about 2005, UNESCO was no longer able to fund new translations. The UNESCO Digital Library (UNESDOC) provides information about works published under the project, as well as associated documents.

== Statistics ==
The following is a list of the major languages works have been translated into, with the number of works translated into that language:

- English: 455
- French: 450
- Spanish: 71
- Arabic: 38
- German: 25

Languages with significant numbers of works subject to translation include:

- Tamil: 341
- Japanese: 152
- Spanish: 105
- Arabic: 62
- Chinese: 61
- Persian: 54
- Sanskrit: 49 (an unwritten dead language in regards to new written texts only, primarily a source of ancient texts from Hindu religion and literature)
- Portuguese: 44
- Bengali: 34
- French: 34
- Korean: 31
- English: 29
- Hindi: 27
- Italian: 24
- Pali: 23 (an unwritten extinct language, primarily a source of early Buddhist texts)
- Hungarian: 16
- Turkish: 16
- Modern Greek: 14
- Romanian: 14
- Urdu: 13

Significant groups of works translated from one language to another include:

- Japanese to English: 92
- Chinese to English: 30
- Persian to English: 26
- Sanskrit to English: 23
- Korean to English: 22
- Spanish to English: 22
- Hindi to English: 20
- Pali to English: 20
- Bengali to English: 19
- Arabic to English: 12
- Spanish to French: 62
- Arabic to French: 41
- Japanese to French: 39
- Portuguese to French: 31
- Chinese to French: 23
- Persian to French: 20
- Italian to French: 19
- Sanskrit to French: 16
- English to French: 14
- Bengali to French: 13
- French to Arabic: 14

Authors with significant numbers of translations include:

- Natsume Sōseki: 11
- Yasunari Kawabata: 9
- Rumi: 8
- Julio Cortázar: 7
- Rabindranath Tagore: 7
- Yukio Mishima: 5
- Muhammad Iqbal: 5
