= Pitka, Iran =

Pitka پيتكا
- Village
- Location within Iran
- Coordinates: 36°22′11″N 52°43′38″E
- Country: Iran
- Province: Mazandaran
- County: Babol
- Bakhsh: Babol Kenar
- Rural District: Babol Kenar

Population (2006)
  - Total: 251
- Time zone: UTC+3:30 (IRST)
  - Summer (DST): UTC+4:30 (IRDT)

Pitka (Persian: پيتكا, also Romanized as Pītkā; also known as Petkā) is a village in Babol Kenar Rural District, Babol Kenar District, Babol County, Mazandaran Province, Iran. At the 2006 census, its population was 251, in 66 families.
