= Laila Hirvisaari =

Finnish author and writer (1938–2021)

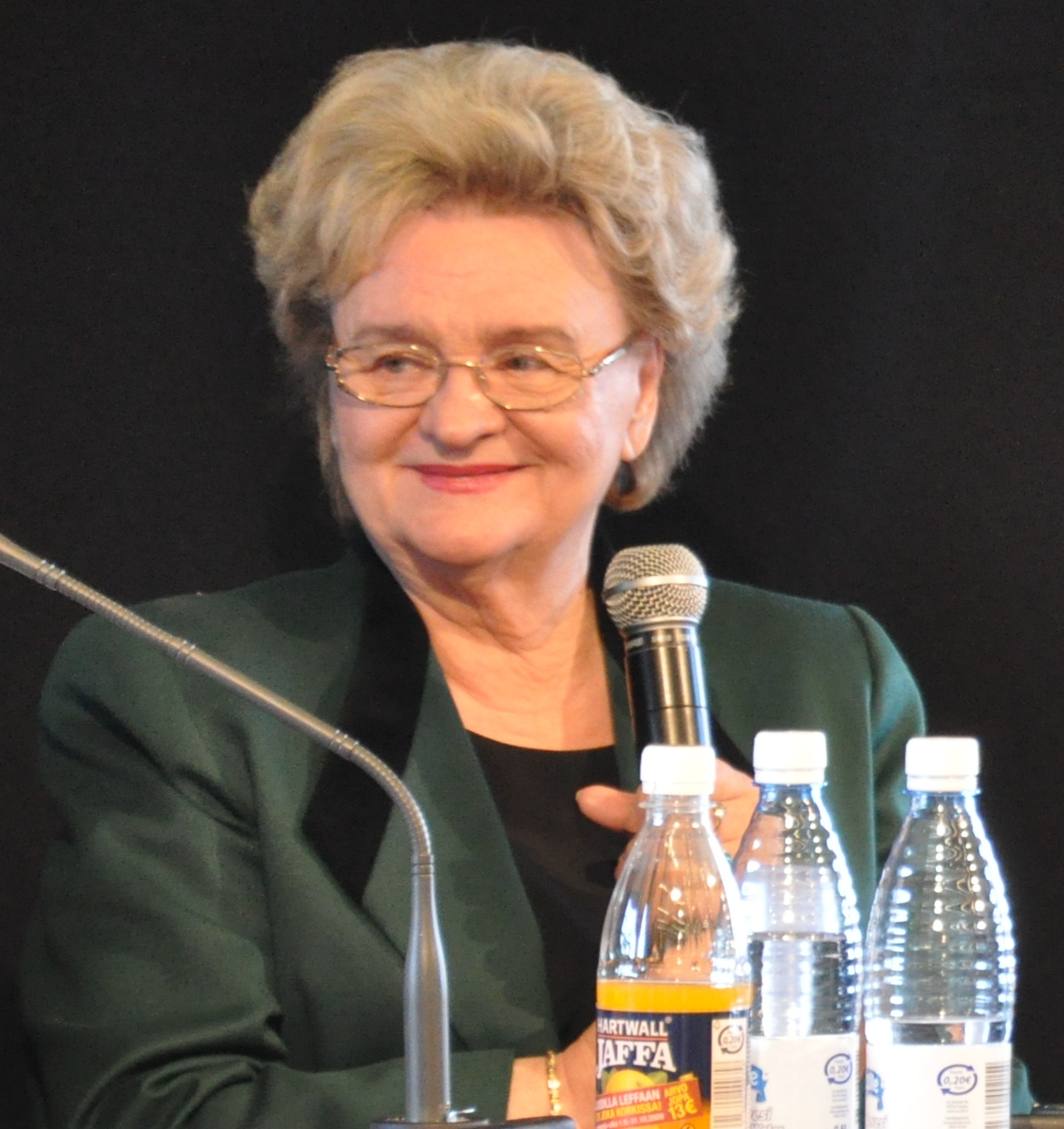
- Laila Hirvisaari in 2009
- Born: 7 June 1938; Viipuri, Finland
- Died: 16 June 2021 (aged 83); Helsinki, Finland
- Other name: Laila Hietamies (1958–2004)
- Spouse(s): Heikki Hietamies, m. 1958

Laila Ellen Kaarina Hirvisaari (7 June 1938 – 16 June 2021), also known as Laila Hietamies, was a Finnish author and writer. By 2008, more than four million copies of her works had been sold.

== Biography ==
Hirvisaari's parents were farmer Aarne Hirvisaari and Saimi Pulli (née Pusa). When Laila Hirvisaari was three years old, her father Aarne died in the Continuation War between Finland and the Soviet Union, so she had no memories of him. After the war, she and her family were evacuated first to Lappeenranta and later to the western part of Finland.

In 1958, she married Heikki Hietamies, a Finnish author also known for hosting the Tangomarkkinat ("Tango fair"), a tango competition (1985–1999).

== Literary career ==
Hietamies's first novel Lehmusten kaupunki ("City of the Lindens") was published in 1972 and began a series of novels about Lappeenranta; the seventh part was published in 2004. Hietamies wrote many other novel series, mostly about Karelia and the consequences of the wars of Finland in the 1940s. She wrote also books about a Russian princess, Sonja, during the Russian Revolution.

In December 2004, Hietamies and her three cousins changed their name back to the maiden name Hirvisaari and from then on, her books were published under that name.

Hirvisaari received many Finnish literature awards, including the P.E. Svinhufvud Foundation's recognition award in 1974. Her novel about Catherine the Great] (Minä, Katariina), however, was nominated for the Finlandia in 2011.

Hirvisaari wrote 34 novels and many short stories and plays, such as Unohduksen lumet (1975) and Olga (1977). A movie was based on her novel Hylätyt talot, autiot pihat ("Abandoned houses, empty yards") in 2000. Several of her books have been translated into other languages:

== Published works ==
- Myrskypilvet (Tormipilved), Estonian, Eesti Raamat, 1996
- Satakielimetsä (Ööbikusalu), Estonian, Eesti Raamat, 1998
- Sonja (Vürstitar Sonja), Estonian, Eesti Raamat, 1995, translated by Debora Vaarandi
- Valkoakaasiat (Valged akaatsiad), Eesti Raamat, 1996, translated by Debora Vaarandi
- Vienan punainen kuu (Red Moon over White Sea), English, Aspasia Books/Canada, 2000, translated by Börje Vähämäki
- Viktoria (Victoria), Estonian, Eesti Raamat, 1999, translated by Anne Karu
