= Sven Tuuva the Hero =

1958 film

- Film poster
- Directed by: Edvin Laine
- Based on: The Tales of Ensign Stål by Johan Ludvig Runeberg
- Produced by: Toivo Särkkä
- Starring: Veikko Sinisalo
- Cinematography: Osmo Harkimo; Olavi Tuomi
- Edited by: Armas Vallasvuo
- Release date: 19 December 1958
- Running time: 136 minutes
- Country: Finland
- Language: Finnish

Sven Tuuva the Hero (Finnish: Sven Tuuva, Swedish: Sven Dufva) is a 1958 Finnish war film written and directed by Edvin Laine, who also stars as one of the lead actors. The cast also includes the director's brother Aarne Laine and the director's wife Mirjam Novero. The film was entered into the 9th Berlin International Film Festival. It is loosely based on the poem "Sven Dufva" which is part of The Tales of Ensign Stål, written by Johan Ludvig Runeberg, the national poet of Finland.

== Cast ==
- Veikko Sinisalo as Sven
- Edvin Laine as Sergeant Ukko Tuuva
- Fanni Halonen as Äiti Tuuva, Tuuva's mother
- Salme Karppinen as Kaarina
- Leif Wager as Johan August Sandels
- Kauko Helovirta as Duncker
- Mirjam Novero as Rva Duncker
- Aarne Laine as Örn
- Leevi Kuuranne as Gustav IV Adolf
- Tommi Rinne as Spets
