= Marc Rivière =

French film director (1950–2025)

Marc Rivière (18 November 1950 – 22 December 2025) was a French film director, actor and screenwriter.

Rivière worked extensively in French television. He directed the 2009 historic television drama La reine et le cardinal set during the early years of the reign of Louis XIV.

Rivière died on 22 December 2025, at the age of 75.

== Filmography ==
Year	Title	Role	Notes
1977	Monsieur Papa	Assistant director	
1977	À chacun son enfer	Assistant director	
1977	Pardon Mon Affaire, Too!	Assistant director	
1978	La Carapate	Assistant director	
1978	State Reasons	Assistant director	
1979	Courage - Let's Run	Assistant director	
1979	Le temps des vacances	Assistant director	
1979	Je te tiens, tu me tiens par la barbichette	Assistant director	
1980	Je vais craquer!!!	Assistant director	
1980	The Umbrella Coup	Assistant director	
1981	Pourquoi pas nous?	Assistant director	
1982	Jamais avant le mariage	Assistant director	
1983	Si elle dit oui... je ne dis pas non	Actor	
1983	L'été de nos quinze ans	Assistant director	
1983	Attention une femme peut en cacher une autre!	Assistant director	
1984	La 7ème cible	Assistant director	
1984	Just the Way You Are	Assistant director	
1984	Les parents ne sont pas simples cette année	Technical Advisor	
1989	Le crime d'Antoine	Director & writer	Festival du Film Policier de Cognac - Critics Award
1991–92	Ferbac	Director & writer	TV series (2 episodes)
1994	Une belle âme	Actor	Short
1994	L'été de Zora	Director & writer	TV movie
1995	La règle du silence	Director	TV movie
1995	L'homme aux semelles de vent	Director	TV movie
1996	Le propre de l'homme	Director, writer & Actor	TV movie
1997	Aventurier malgré lui	Director	TV movie
1997	Le censeur du lycée d'Epinal	Director & writer	TV movie
1998	Louise et les marchés	Director	TV mini-series
1999	Le voyou et le magistrat	Director	TV movie
1999	La petite fille en costume marin	Director & Actor	TV mini-series
2000	Toute la ville en parle	Director & Actor	TV movie
2001	Les filles à papa	Director	TV movie
2002	Le miroir d'Alice	Director & Actor	TV movie
2002	Une fille dans l'azur - Caroline Fabre	Director	TV movie
2002–03	Père et maire	Director	TV series (2 episodes)
2004	Penn sardines	Director	TV movie
2004	Haute coiffure	Director & Actor	TV movie
2005	Le mystère Alexia	Director	TV movie
2005	L'arbre et l'oiseau	Director	TV movie
2006	Le Lièvre de Vatanen	Director, writer & Producer	
2007	Tragédie en direct	Director	TV movie
2007	Chez Maupassant	Director	TV series (1 episode)
2009	La reine et le cardinal	Director & Actor	TV movie
2010	Tempêtes	Director, writer & Actor	TV movie
2011–17	Le sang de la vigne	Director & writer	TV series (7 episodes)
2016	La face	Director & writer	TV movie
