= Edvin Laine =

Finnish film director (1905–1989)

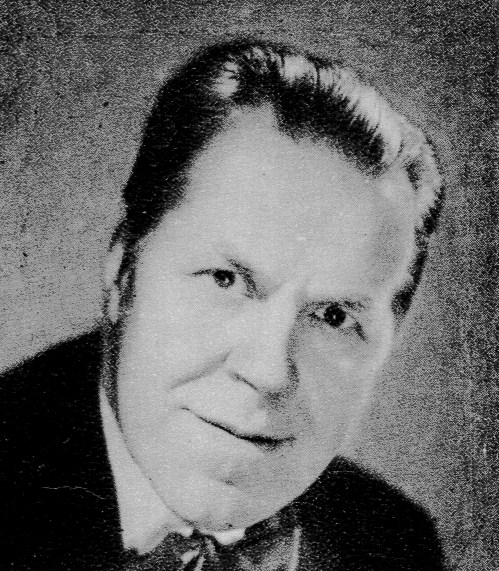
- Born: Edvin Armas Bovellán; 13 July 1905; Iisalmi, Grand Duchy of Finland
- Died: 18 November 1989 (aged 84); Helsinki, Finland
- Occupations: Film director, actor

Edvin Armas Laine (13 July 1905 – 18 November 1989) was a Finnish film director and actor. Laine was born Bovellán.

== Career ==
Laine directed a comedy Aaltoska orkaniseeraa and family film Sleeping Beauty, both in 1949.

The Unknown Soldier, a film Laine directed in 1955 based on Väinö Linna's novel, was a big sensation in Finland. There have later been two other film adaptations of the same novel but Laine's version remains the best known. Laine also directed another film based on Väinö Linna's book, Here, Beneath the North Star (1968), which also was a successful movie in Finland.

His 1958 film Sven Tuuva the Hero was entered into the 9th Berlin International Film Festival. Three years later, his film Skandaali tyttökoulussa (English: Scandal in the Girls' School) was entered into the 2nd Moscow International Film Festival. Here, Beneath the North Star was entered into the 6th Moscow International Film Festival. His 1970 film Aksel and Elina was entered into the 7th Moscow International Film Festival.

== Personal life ==
Laine was married to the actress Mirjam Novero and Martta Parkkonen. He is buried in the Hietaniemi Cemetery in Helsinki.
