= North Express =

1947 Finnish thriller film

- Directed by: Roland af Hällström
- Written by: Karen Aabye (novel); Roland af Hällström; Juho Tervonen
- Produced by: Yrjö Norta
- Starring: Ansa Ikonen; Leif Wager; Tauno Majuri
- Cinematography: Esko Töyri
- Edited by: Tapio Ilomäki
- Music by: Tapio Ilomäki
- Production company: Fenno-Filmi
- Distributed by: Fenno-Filmi
- Release date: 29 August 1947
- Running time: 91 minutes
- Country: Finland
- Language: Finnish

North Express (Finnish: Pikajuna pohjoiseen) is a 1947 Finnish thriller film directed by Roland af Hällström and starring Ansa Ikonen, Leif Wager and Tauno Majuri. The film was produced in parallel with a Swedish language version Tåg norrut which starred different actors and was directed by Palle Hagmann.

== Cast ==
- Ansa Ikonen as Maire Kyrö
- Leif Wager as Reino Sompa
- Tauno Majuri as Mauno Ismola
- Aku Korhonen as Hugo Auvonen
- Arna Högdahl as Counsellor's wife
- Sven Relander as Fjalar Albert Lindström
- Eino Kaipainen as Kaarlo Kyrö
- Liisa Tuomi as Ilona Viirola
- Anja Kola as Raili Oras
- Tapio Nurkka as Kalevi Oras
- Arvi Tuomi as Major of the Salvation Army
- Kalle Viherpuu as Harras
- Unto Salminen as Ahvo
- Emil Vinermo as Kaukomieli Lemmitty Latvanen
- Aku Peltonen as Ossi Lintunen
- Eero Leväluoma as Saarros
- Atos Konst as Siltanen
- Eva Hemming as Salvationist
- Varma Lahtinen as Loviisa
- Lulu Paasipuro as Impi Lintunen
- Matti Aulos as Train conductor
- Teijo Joutsela as Loppi
- Elsa Nyström as Raili's mother
- Lauri Korpela as Raili's father
- Aatu Talanne as Doctor
- Lauri Kyöstilä as Station man in Perämaa
- Mauri Jaakkola as Lauri Aalto

== Bibliography ==
- Pietari Kääpä. Directory of World Cinema: Finland. Intellect Books, 2012.
