= Kyllikki Forssell =

Finnish actress (1925–2019)

Teatterineuvos Vapaaherratar Kyllikki Forssell
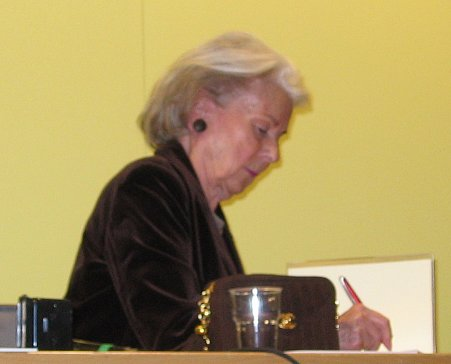
- Forssell in 2007
- Born: Kyllikki Kaarina Forssell; 2 May 1925; Helsinki, Finland
- Died: 7 October 2019 (aged 94); Helsinki
- Occupation(s): actress, director
- Spouses: Patrick Bruun (m. 1945; div. 1950) Erik Indrenius-Zalewski (m. 1951; died 1962)
- Awards: Pro Finlandia (1976); Ida Aalberg Prize (1991)

Kyllikki Forssell (2 May 1925 – 7 October 2019) was a leading Finnish stage and film actress, with a career spanning over 60 years from the mid-20th to the early 21st century and film director.

She was one of the first four Finnish women film directors.

== Early life and education ==
Kyllikki Forssell was born in Helsinki to cavalry Colonel Juho Forssell and Kyllikki née Nyman-Linnove. She had a strict, military-style upbringing, with her mother insisting — despite the family being Finnish-speaking — on speaking French to her daughter.

She received her education in Finnish, Swedish and German, completing her secondary school in 1943, and went on, against the wishes of her anti-thespian father, to study acting at the Suomi-Filmi cinematic school (1943–44) and the Swedish Theatre stage school (1944–46).

== Career ==
Forssell was regarded as an intelligent, confident, and technically skilled actor, with a line of strong, regal characters in her repertoire.

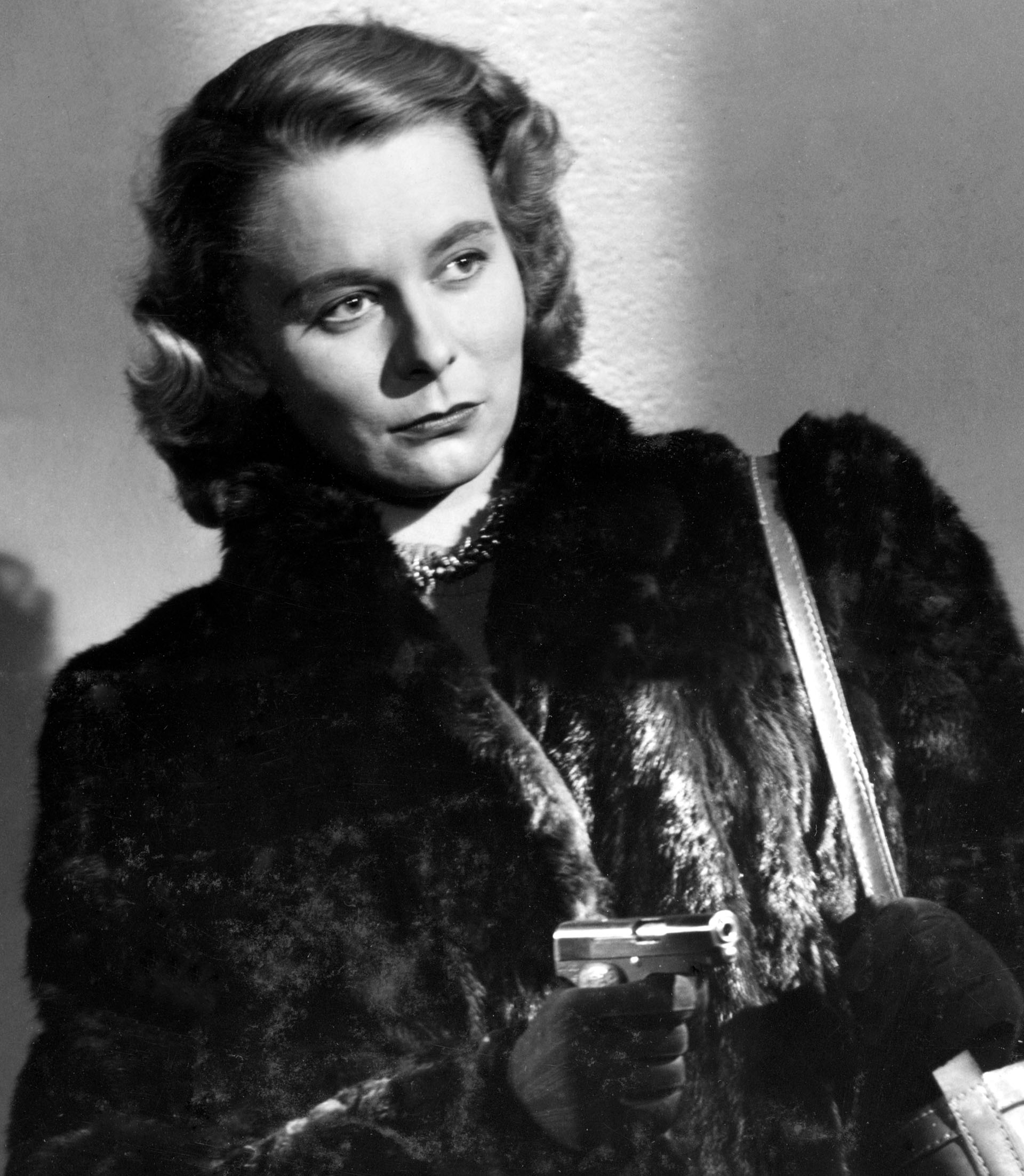
Publicity photo of Forssell, for the 1951 Finnish film Ylijäämänainen

Although she appeared in several films, she is best known as a stage actor, most notably attached to the Finnish National Theatre where she worked over 40 years from 1948 until the early 1990s. She also worked extensively with the Helsinki City Theatre.

She also directed four productions at the National Theatre, as well as three television dramas.

=== Stage work (selected) ===
A small selection of Forssell's many roles included (all at the Finnish National Theatre, unless otherwise indicated):

- Jessica in Dirty Hands
- Annie Sullivan in The Miracle Worker
- Catharine in Suddenly Last Summer
- Gwendolen Fairfax in The Importance of Being Earnest
- Mary Tyrone in Long Day's Journey into Night
- Miss Mary Shepherd / Margaret Fairchild in The Lady in the Van
- Marquise de Merteuil in Les Liaisons Dangereuses

Her portrayal of Annie Sullivan in The Miracle Worker was considered by some as the performance of the decade.

=== Filmography as actress (selected) ===
- Tyttö Astuu Elämään (1943) — Aino Mäkinen
- Nuoria Ihmisiä (1943) — Leni
- Suomisen Olli Yllättää (1945) — Leila
- Ylijäämänainen (1951) — Ella Quist

=== Filmography as director ===
- Shamrock (1953) - episode Happy Family
- Merihevonen (1961)
- Play Strindberg (1971)

== Honours and awards ==
In 1976, Forssell received the Pro Finlandia medal of the Order of the Lion of Finland, and in 1991, Finland's premier theatre award, the Ida Aalberg Prize.

In 1989, the honorary title of Teatterineuvos (lit. 'Theatre Counselor') was conferred on Forssell by the President of Finland.

== Personal life ==
In 1945, Forssell married the historian, Professor Patrick Bruun, but the marriage ended in divorce only five years later.

In 1951, she married Freiherr Erik Indrenius-Zalewski, thus becoming entitled Freifrau (Finnish: Vapaaherratar).

In the 1960s her affair with fellow actor Esko Salminen, 15 years her junior, caused something of a scandal due to their age difference.

Forssell retired in 2012, and died in 2019 at the age of 94, after a long battle with cancer.
