= Mirja Mane =

Finnish actress (1929–1974)

Impi Maria Mirjami Mane (born Mirjami Manelius; 9 May 1929 – 21 April 1974) was a Finnish actress. She is best remembered for her role as the witch in a Roland af Hällström film Noita palaa elämään. The nudity scenes of that film provoked a stir at the time, but her acting skills were questioned by some critics. Mane made only five film appearances during her career. She died after a short illness in 1974 at the age of 44.

== Filmography ==
- Kaunis Veera eli ballaadi Saimaalta (1950)
- Noita palaa elämään (1952)
- Saariston tyttö (1953)
- Kuningas kulkureitten (1953)
- Morsiusseppele (1954)
