= Lena Horne Theatre =

Broadway theater in Manhattan, New York

- Mansfield Theatre (1926–1960); Brooks Atkinson Theatre (1960–2022)
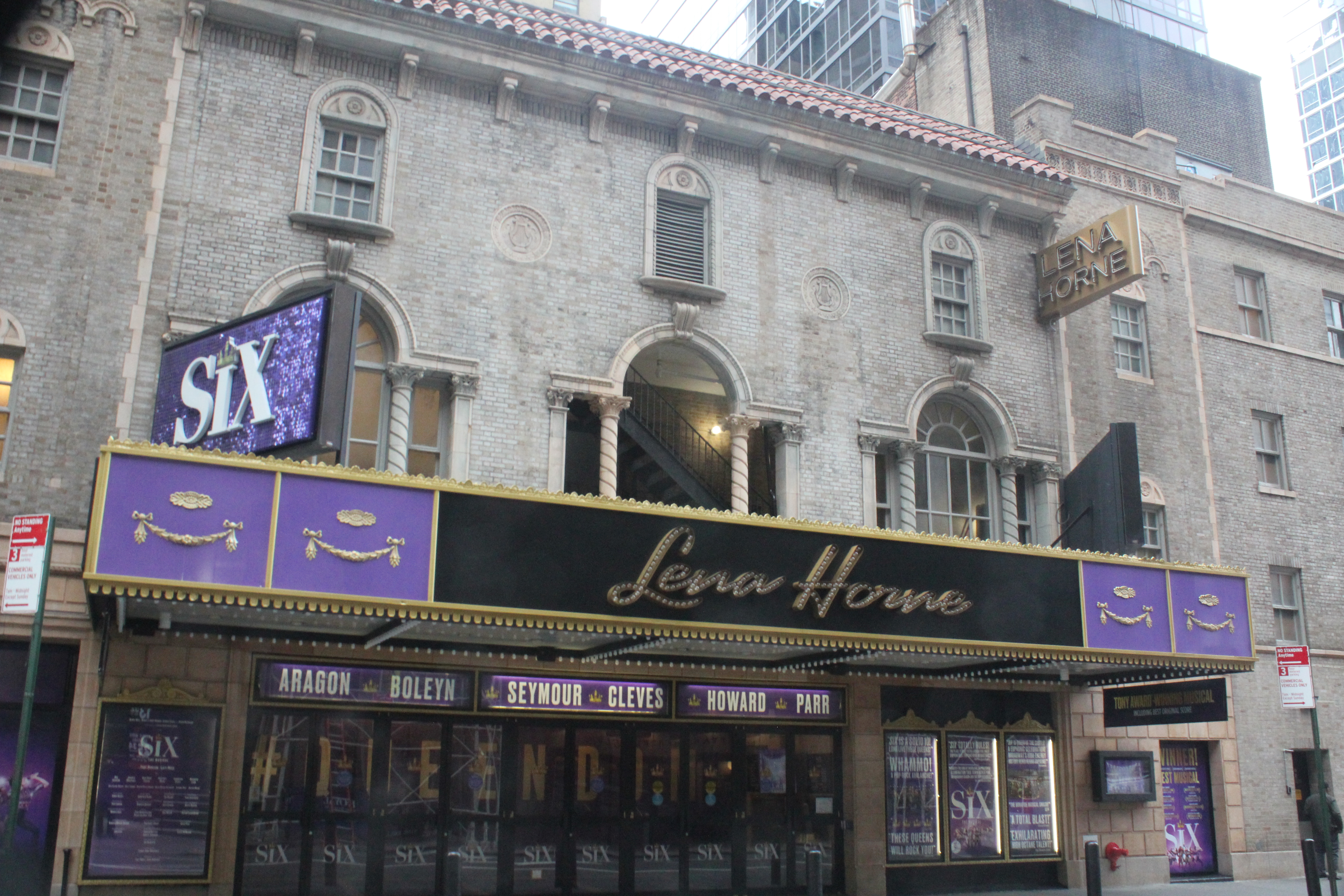
- Showing Six, 2022
- Interactive map of Lena Horne Theatre
- Address: 256 West 47th Street; Manhattan, New York; United States
- Coordinates: 40°45′36″N 73°59′13″W
- Owner: Nederlander Organization
- Capacity: 1,069 (Note: This capacity is approximate and may vary depending on the show.)
- Type: Broadway
- Production: Six

Construction
- Opened: February 15, 1926 (100 years ago)
- Years active: 1926–1950, 1960–present
- Architect: Herbert J. Krapp

Website
- broadwaydirect.com/venue/brooks-atkinson-theatre/

New York City Landmark
- Designated: November 4, 1987
- Reference no.: 1311
- Designated entity: Facade

New York City Landmark
- Designated: November 4, 1987
- Reference no.: 1312
- Designated entity: Auditorium interior

The Lena Horne Theatre (previously the Mansfield Theatre and the Brooks Atkinson Theatre) is a Broadway theater at 256 West 47th Street in the Theater District of Midtown Manhattan in New York City, New York, U.S. It was designed by Herbert J. Krapp in a Spanish Revival style and was constructed for Irwin Chanin. It has 1,069 seats across two levels and is operated by the Nederlander Organization. Both the facade and the auditorium interior are New York City landmarks.

The facade is divided into two sections: the four-story stage house to the west, covered in buff-colored brick, and the three-story auditorium to the east, designed with yellow-beige brick and terracotta. The ground floor, which contains the theater's entrance, is shielded by a marquee. Above is a set of Palladian windows on the second story, as well as rectangular sash windows with lunettes on the third story. The facade is topped by an entablature and a sloping tiled roof. The auditorium contains ornamental plasterwork, a sloped orchestra level, a large balcony, and a coved ceiling. The balcony level contains box seats near the front of the auditorium, above which are murals.

Opening on February 15, 1926, the Mansfield Theatre was developed with the Biltmore (now Samuel J. Friedman) Theatre across the street, which had opened two months prior. The Mansfield struggled to attract hits from its opening until 1945 when Michael Myerberg bought it. In 1950, the Mansfield was leased to CBS for television productions under the name Studio 59. When Myerberg returned it to legitimate use in September 1960, he renamed it after the former New York Times theater critic Brooks Atkinson. The Nederlander Organization purchased a partial ownership stake in the Brooks Atkinson Theatre in 1967 and became a full owner in 1974. Following a renovation in 2000, the theater has hosted several shows in the 21st century, such as the musical Waitress and Six. On November 1, 2022, the theater was renamed after singer-actress and civil-rights activist Lena Horne.

== Site ==
The Lena Horne Theatre is at 258 West 47th Street, on the south sidewalk between Eighth Avenue and Broadway, near Times Square in the Theater District of Midtown Manhattan in New York City, New York, U.S. The square land lot covers 10,050 square feet (934 m^{2}), with a frontage of 100 feet (30 m) on 47th Street and a depth of 100 feet. The Lena Horne shares the block with the Paramount Hotel to the south and the Hotel Edison and Lunt-Fontanne Theatre to the east. Other nearby buildings include the Samuel J. Friedman Theatre to the north; the Ethel Barrymore Theatre and Longacre Theatre to the northeast; the Richard Rodgers Theatre and Imperial Theatre to the south; and the off-Broadway 47th Street Theatre to the west.

== Design ==
The Lena Horne Theatre, originally the Mansfield Theatre, was designed by Herbert J. Krapp in a modern Spanish style and was constructed in 1926 for the Chanin brothers. It is operated by the Nederlander Organization.

=== Facade ===
The facade consists of two sections. The three-story-tall eastern section is wider and is symmetrical, containing the auditorium entrance. It is made of yellow-beige brick with white terracotta decorations. The western section, which contains the stage house, is four stories high and contains a brick facade. The third story of the auditorium is on an intermediate level between the third and fourth stories of the stage house.

==== Auditorium section ====
The first story of the auditorium's facade is symmetrically arranged. There is a water table made of terrazzo, above which are rusticated terracotta blocks made in ashlar. Several openings are placed within the first story. The easternmost opening contains recessed metal doors with sign boards. At the center are five metal double doors connecting with the box office lobby. The westernmost opening consists of a metal stage door. Sign boards are placed on the wall to the left (east) of the center openings, as well as on two of the double doors to the right (west) of center. A marquee hangs over the five center doorways and the immediate adjacent sign boards.

On the upper stories, the auditorium is arranged into three sections from left to right. The auditorium's outermost openings, on the second and third stories, have a single six-over-six sash window on either story. Lunettes with rosettes are placed above each of these windows. These windows are surrounded by a brick band, which is laid in a pattern resembling an arch. At the top of this arch is a molding with corbels, as well as a brick panel with bond work in a basket-weave pattern. Above this are terracotta friezes with fleur-de-lis and rosette patterns, topped by a brick parapet.

The central section contains three Palladian window frames at the second floor, with bracket-shaped keystones above each window. Twisting colonettes divide the openings in each Palladian frame, while the outer sections of the windows are bordered by pilasters with Corinthian-style capitals. The center opening is an open-air loggia, behind which is a fire stair with an iron railing. The other two Palladian openings contain sash windows. At the third story, there are three openings, surrounded by twisting moldings and a terracotta frame. The center opening is a ventilation grate while the other two contain six-over-six sash windows. All three window openings have a lunette with rosette above them. Between the window openings are medallions that depict lyres. A sign with the name "Brooks Atkinson" projects from the western side of the third floor. Brackets run above the third floor, supporting a cornice and a Spanish tile roof.

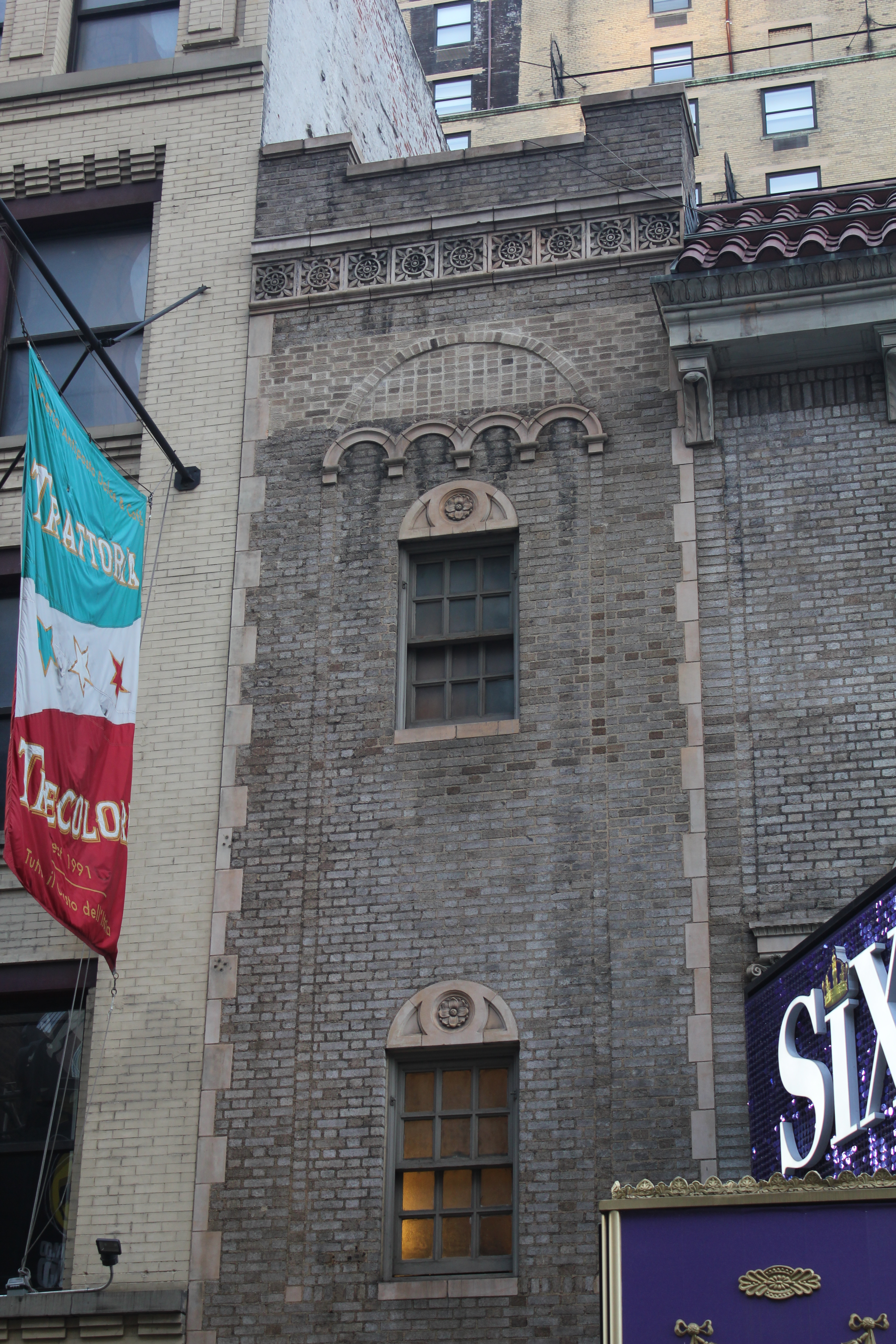
Detail of an outer bay

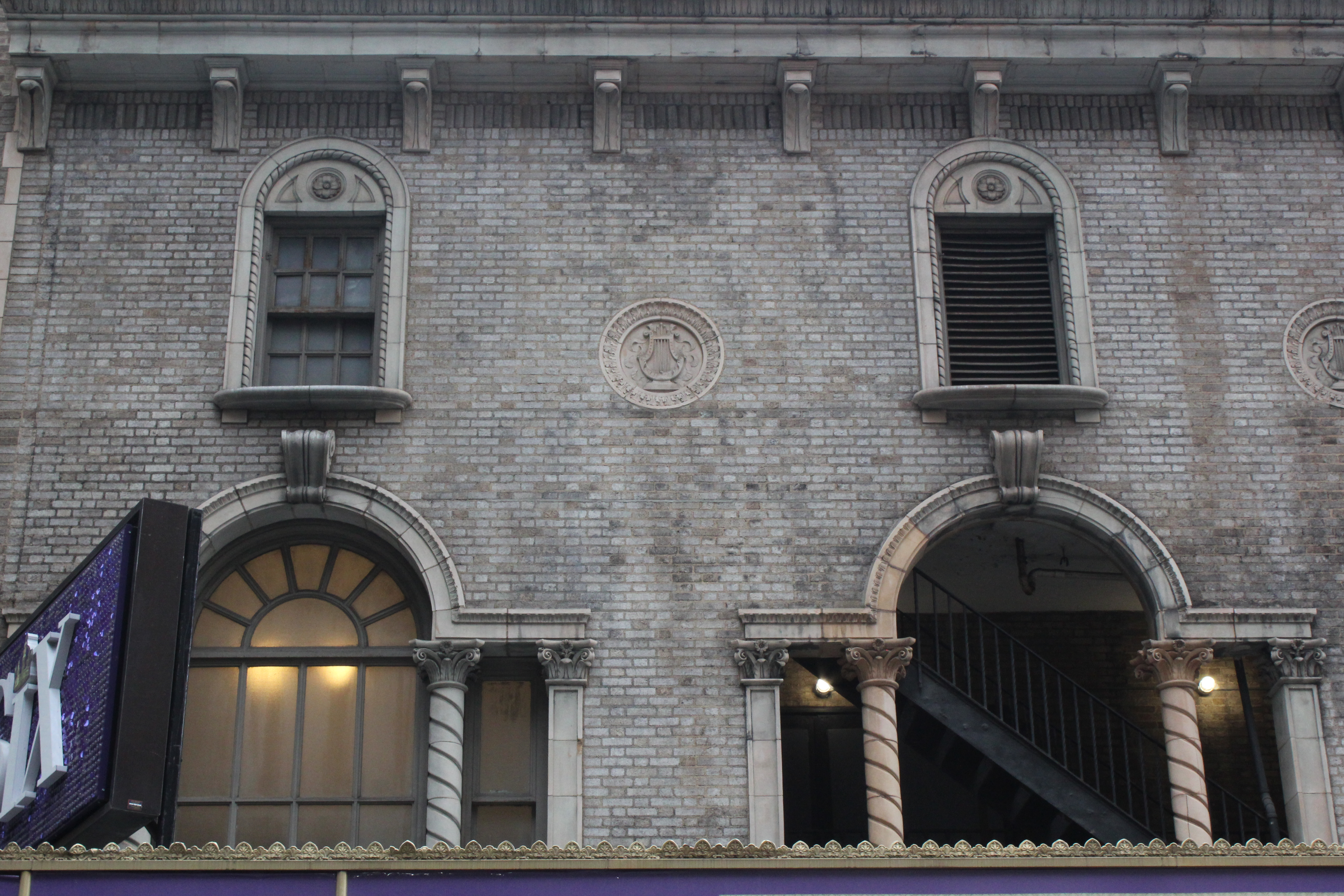
Detail of the center and left-of-center bays

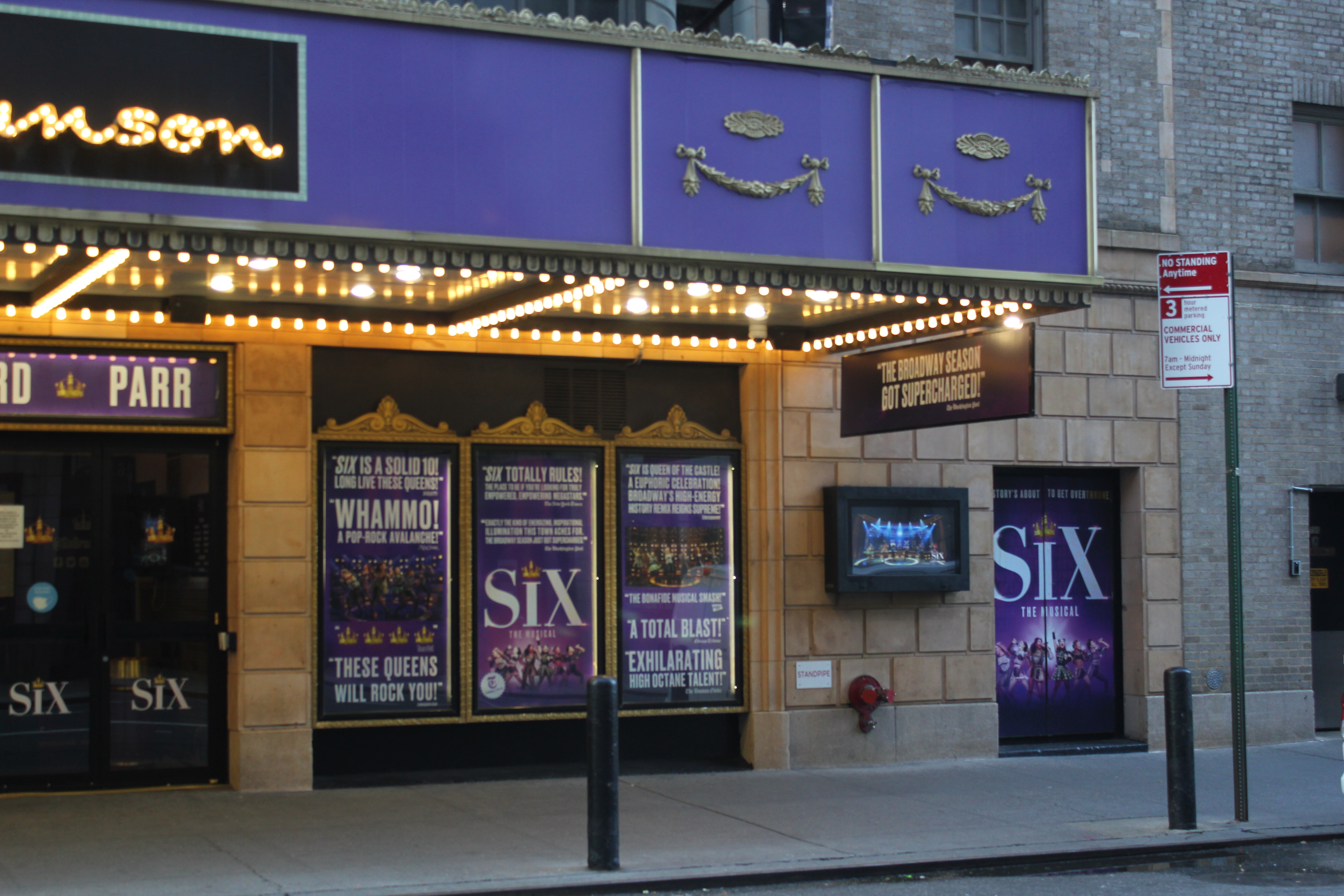
View of signboards to the right (west) of the main doors

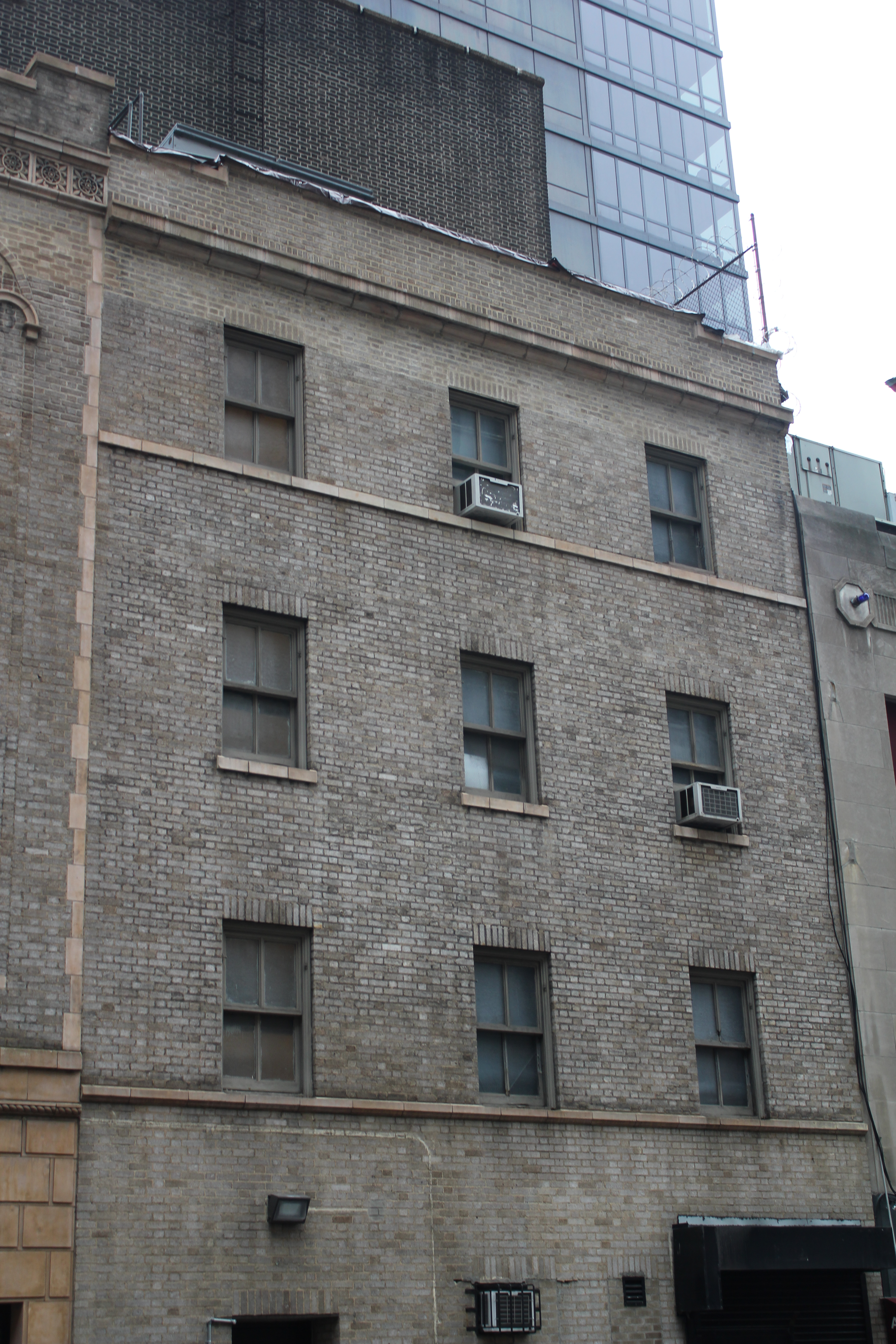
Stage house

==== Stage house section ====
The Lena Horne Theatre's stage house is much simpler in design, with a terrazzo water table. Unlike in the auditorium section, all four stories are faced in brick. At ground level, there is a doorway and a garage opening, between which are two bricked-up window openings. A string course runs above the ground story. On each of the second through fourth floors, there are three sash windows with two-over-two panes, and a brick lintel is placed above each window. The stage house is topped by a cornice and a parapet.

=== Auditorium ===
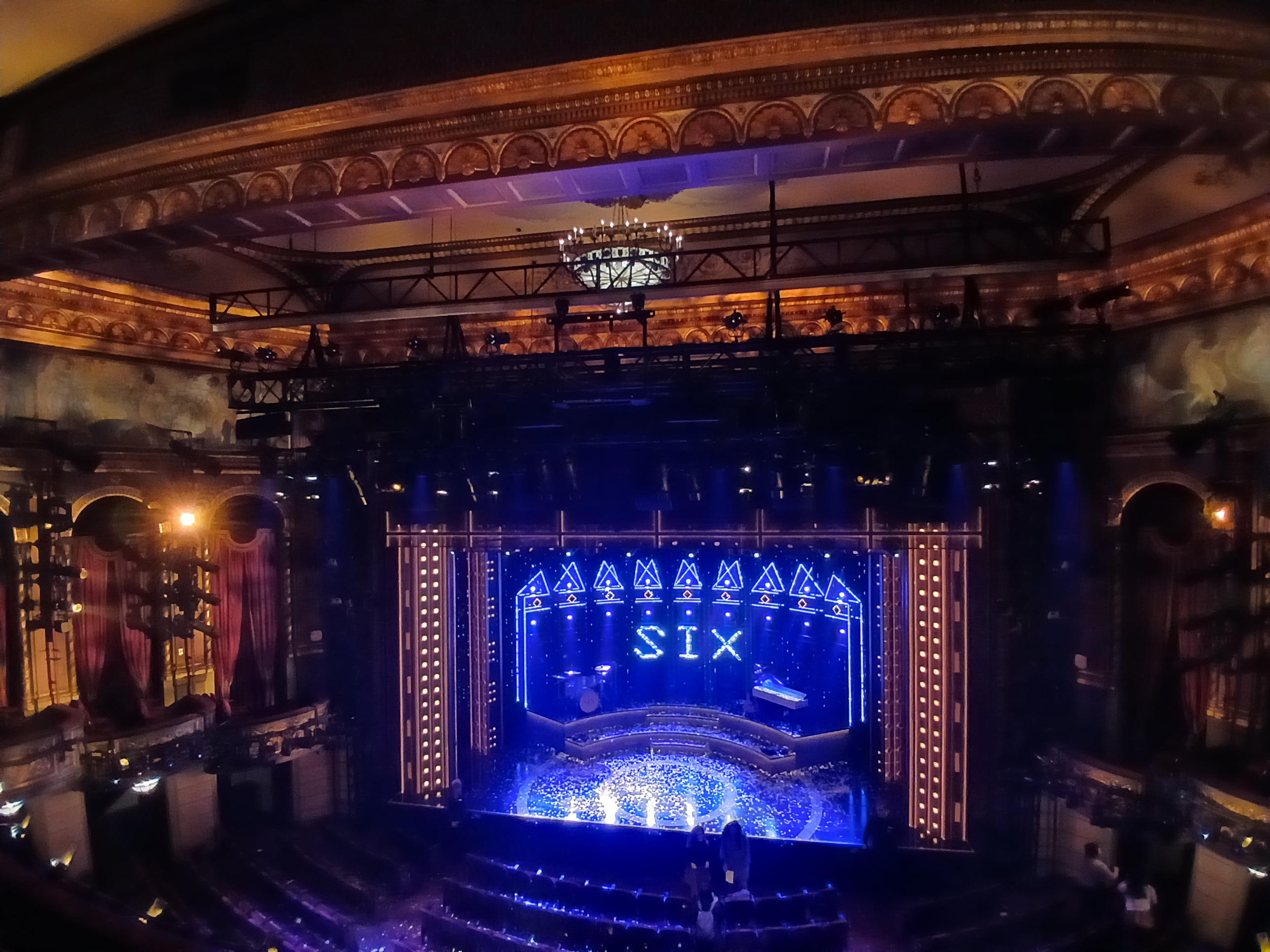
The auditorium as seen from the balcony level

The auditorium has an orchestra level, one balcony, boxes, and a stage behind the proscenium arch. The auditorium space is designed with plaster decorations in low relief. According to the Nederlander Organization, the auditorium has 1,069 seats; meanwhile, The Broadway League cites a capacity of 1,094 seats and Playbill cites 1,045 seats. The Lena Horne Theatre is designed in a Spanish style and originally had a seating capacity of 1,125. The interior design scheme was overseen by Roman Meltzer, who was the architect for Russian emperor Nicholas II.

==== Seating areas ====
The rear (east) end of the orchestra contains a promenade with paneled walls and a molded cornice. The orchestra is raked, sloping down toward the stage. There are two columns between the orchestra and the promenade, between which is a decorative railing. Two staircases, with decorative metal railings, lead from either end of the promenade to the balcony level. The orchestra's north (right) wall has doors from the lobby, while the south (left) and rear walls contain exit doors. There are foliate swag motifs on either side of the exit signs above the doors. The orchestra's side walls contain decorative panels. Bronze lighting sconces are placed along the walls of the orchestra and its promenade.

The balcony level is divided into front and rear sections by an aisle halfway across the depth. On either side of the crossover aisle are exit doors, which are placed between pilasters and wall panels on either side. Above the exit doors are arch decorations and a frieze with swags. The rest of the balcony's side walls contain panels, which are divided into upper and lower sections, with foliate decorations in the upper panels and plain decorations in the lower panels. A cornice runs above all of the walls. The front rail of the balcony contains shields and foliate decorations. Light boxes are installed on the front rail. The underside of the balcony has plasterwork panels with crystal light fixtures suspended from medallions. Air-conditioning vents are placed along some of the panels under the balcony.

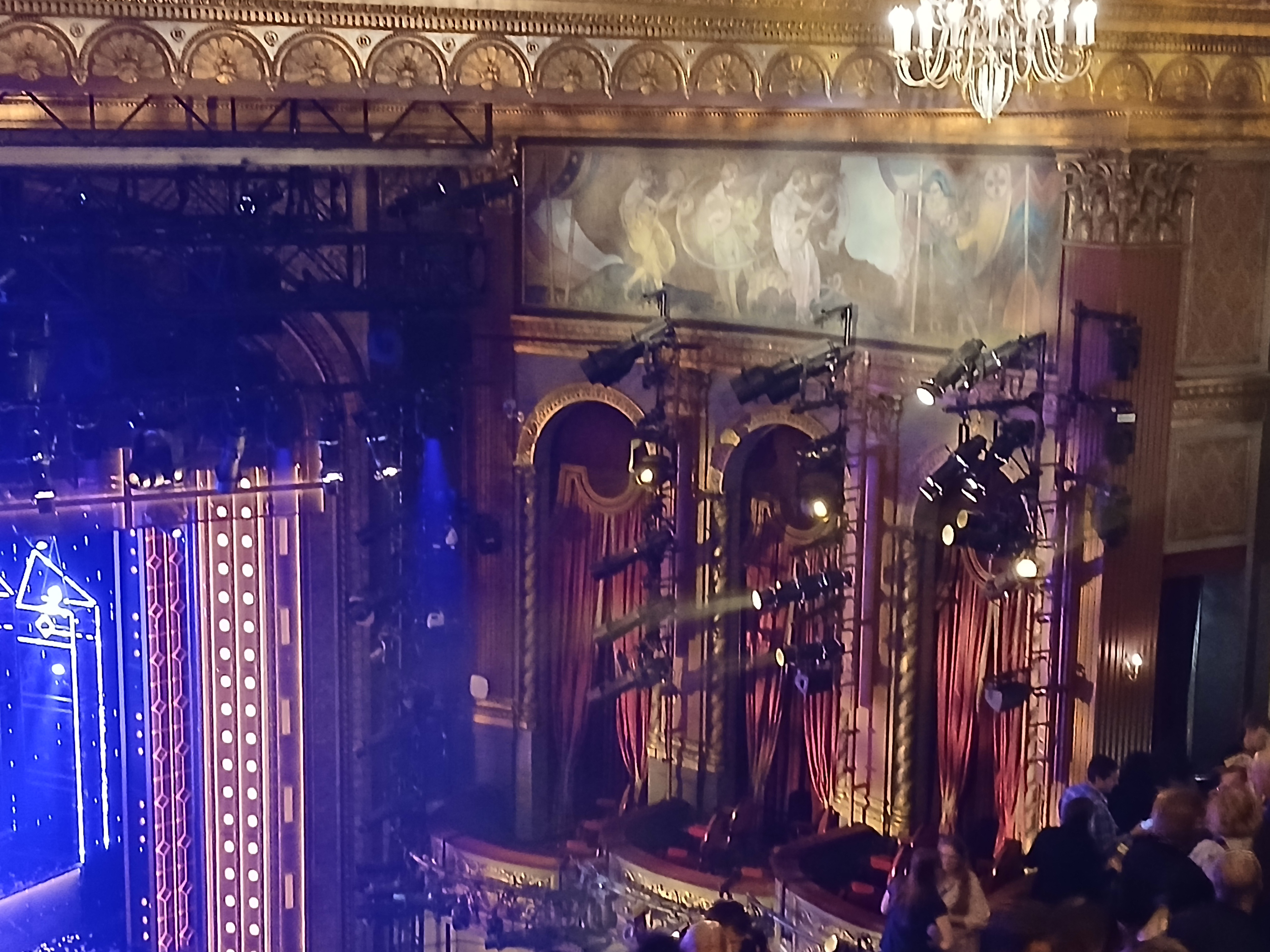
Curved wall section on the auditorium's right-hand wall, with three arches and seating boxes

On either side of the proscenium is a curved wall section with three arches, each of which corresponds to a box at balcony level. The wall section is flanked by fluted pilasters with Corinthian-style gilded capitals. At orchestra level, the wall sections contain a false rusticated wall with three rectangular openings. The undersides of the boxes contain crystal light fixtures similar to those on the balcony. The fronts of the boxes are curved outward and contain shields and foliate decorations. Twisting colonettes run beside each arch, while egg-and-dart moldings run along the tops of the arches. The arches are separated by fluted pilasters with Corinthian capitals, above which is a molding. At the tops of the boxes are murals that show commedia dell'arte and muses. These murals were painted by A. Battisti and G. Troombul.

==== Other design features ====
There is a three-centered proscenium arch next to the boxes. The archway is surrounded by a molded band with anthemia, egg-and-dart, and rope motifs. The spandrels, above the corners of the proscenium arch, contain Adam-style sphinx motifs. There are fluted pilasters with gilded Corinthian capitals along either side of the arch. Above these pilasters is a frieze containing motifs of arches with fans.

A beam separates the ceiling into front and rear sections. The beam is decorated with a frieze containing arch-and-fan motifs (similar to the frieze above the proscenium). The front section is a coved ceiling, surrounded by a frieze with an arch-and-fan motif. Moldings divide the cove into sections, which are decorated with urns and foliate designs. A crystal chandelier hangs from the center of the cove. The rear section contains molded bands with bead motifs, which divide the ceiling into arch- and lozenge-shaped panels. Near the side walls, the moldings contain cartouches with foliate designs, from which are suspended four chandeliers.

== History ==
Times Square became the epicenter for large-scale theater productions between 1900 and the Great Depression. During the 1900s and 1910s, many theaters in Midtown Manhattan were developed by the Shubert brothers, one of the major theatrical syndicates of the time. The Chanin brothers developed another grouping of theaters in the mid-1920s. Though the Chanins largely specialized in real estate rather than theaters, Irwin Chanin had become interested in theater when he was an impoverished student at the Cooper Union. He subsequently recalled that he had been "humiliated" by having to use a separate door whenever he bought cheap seats in an upper balcony level.

The theater was originally named for British actor Richard Mansfield (1857–1907). From 1960 to 2022, it was named for Brooks Atkinson (1894–1984), who was the theater critic for The New York Times from 1925 to 1960. Since 2022, the theater has been named for African-American actress and singer Lena Horne (1917–2010).

=== Initial Broadway run ===
==== 1920s ====
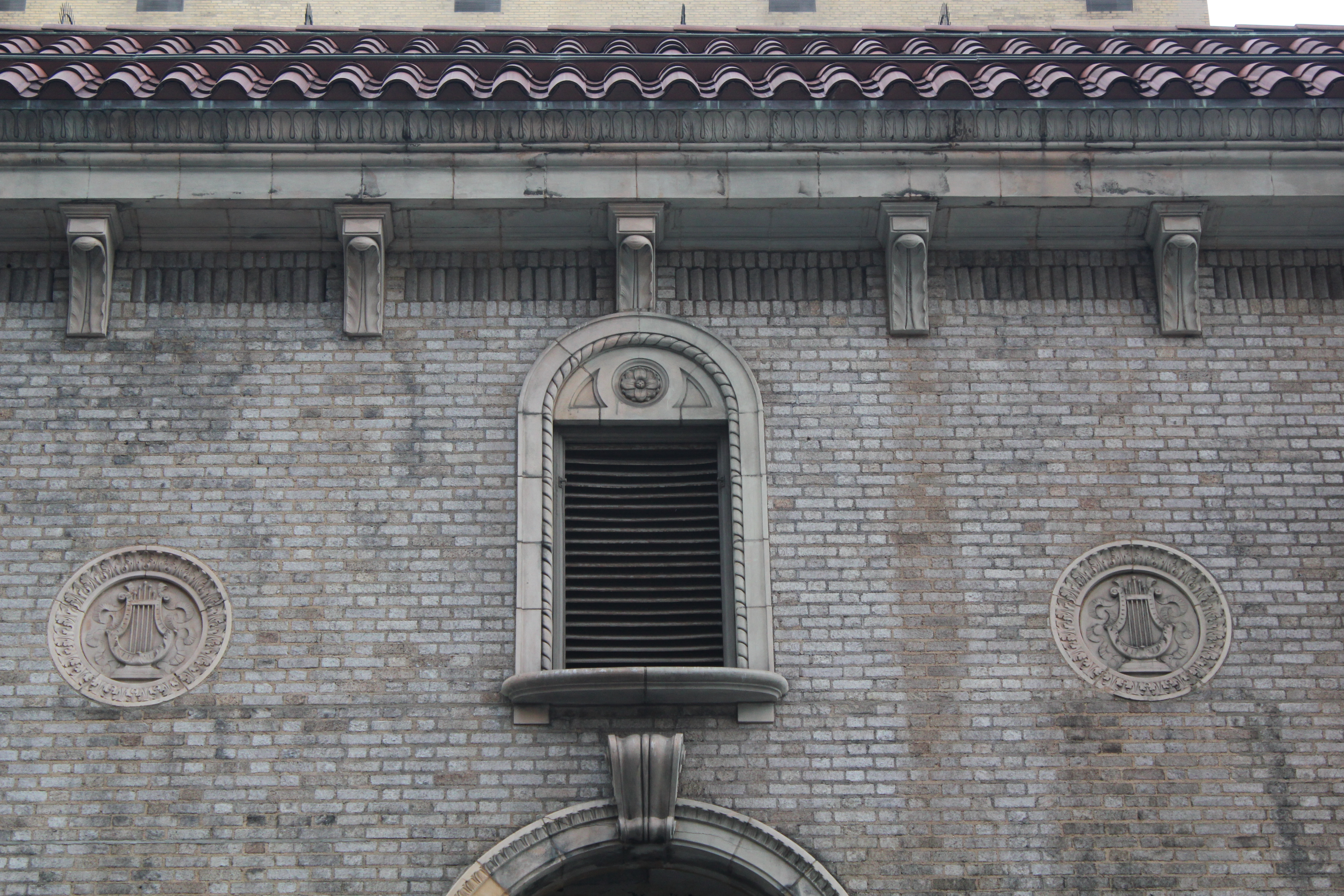
Detail of an upper-story window

Irwin Chanin was a newcomer to the Broadway theater industry when he was developing his first theater, the 46th Street (now Richard Rodgers). Chanin hired Herbert Krapp, an experienced architect who had designed multiple Broadway theaters for the Shubert brothers. The 46th Street Theatre opened in early 1925 as Chanin's first Broadway theater. Chanin retained Krapp to design the Biltmore and Mansfield theaters on 47th Street, which at the time was a largely residential street. Irwin Chanin, who built the theater with his brother Henry, acquired the property title to the two theater sites on 47th Street in March 1925. Though the Biltmore opened that December, the Mansfield was not finished until early the following year. On February 15, 1926, prior to the theater's opening, a luncheon was hosted in honor of Mansfield's widow Beatrice Cameron. Later that night, the theater opened with the melodrama The Night Duel.

Generally, the Mansfield's early productions were flops. The Night Duel lasted for 17 performances before closing, and three similarly short-lived shows followed. The theater's first moderate success was If I Was Rich with Joe Laurie Jr., which opened in September 1926 and had 92 performances. The Ladder with Antoinette Perry opened at the Mansfield the next month, running for several hundred performances across numerous theaters. This was followed by a revival of Eugene O'Neill's Beyond the Horizon. At the end of the year, the Mansfield staged three Hebrew-language plays performed by the Habima Players of Moscow, including The Dybbuk. A revival of the Henrik Ibsen play Ghosts, with Minnie Maddern Fiske, had 24 performances at the beginning of 1927. The theater hosted short-lived plays for the rest of that year. That April, the Mansfield was sold to Irving Lewine, who leased the theater back to the Chanins for 63 years.

In August 1927, Charles L. Wagner arranged to operate the Mansfield for a year. Just before Wagner was scheduled to assume operation that October, Lew Fields took over the lease and Wagner's shows were relocated to another theater. Fields planned to stage at least four shows and rename the theater for himself. The beginning of 1928 saw short runs of the plays Mongolia and Atlas and Eva. The first Fields production at the Mansfield was the Rodgers and Hart musical Present Arms in April 1928, which ran for 147 performances. The theater's sign was changed to display the name "Lew Fields Theatre", though programs referred to the house as "Lew Fields's Mansfield Theatre". Rodgers and Hart also wrote the music for Chee-Chee, which was much less popular than Present Arms. At the end of the year, Lew Fields starred in Hello, Daddy, which was produced by his children Dorothy and Herbert Fields; it had 198 performances. The theater reverted to its original name in March 1929 with the opening of the flop Indiscretion.

==== 1930s and 1940s ====
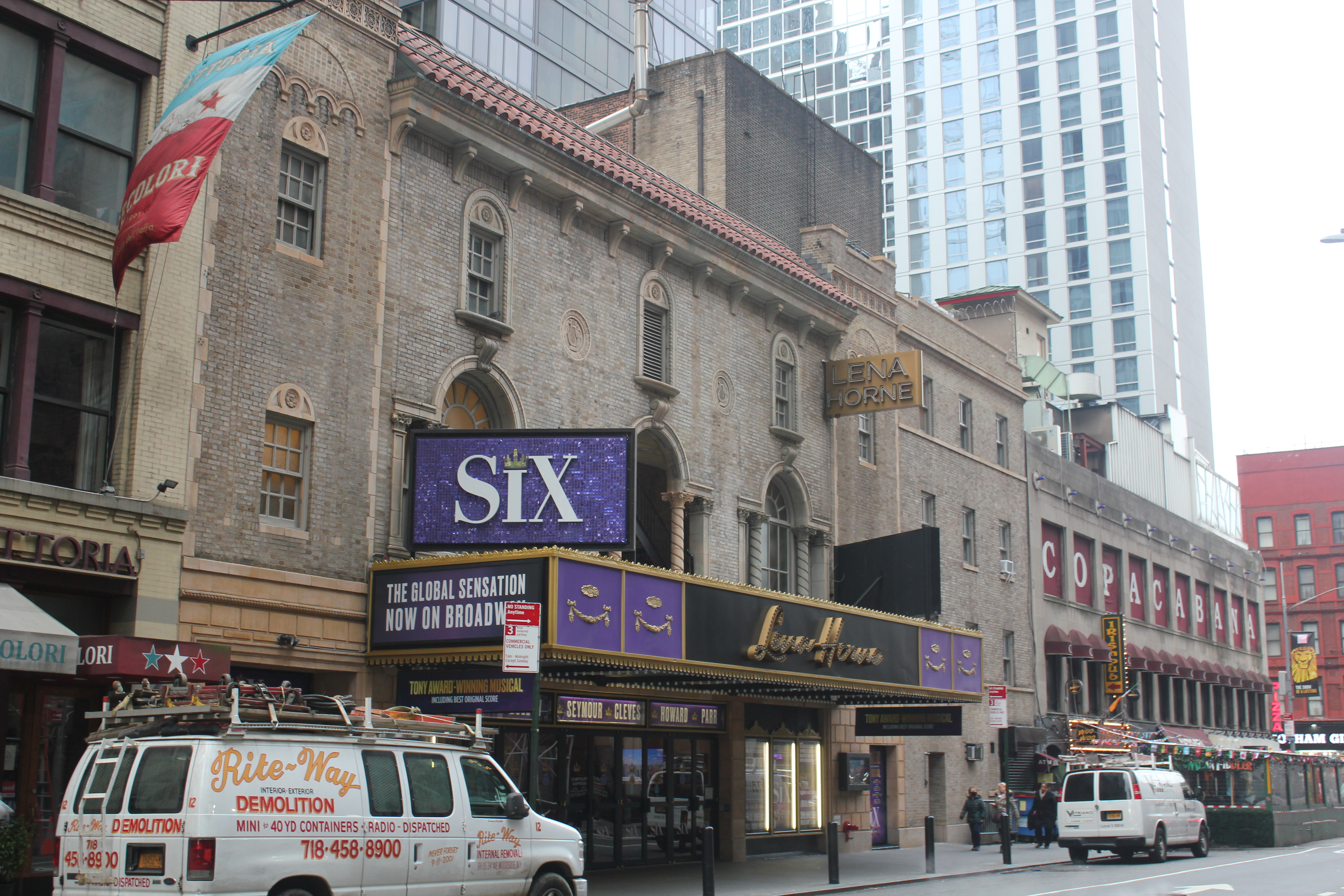
Viewed from the east

The next success at the Mansfield was Marc Connelly's The Green Pastures, which opened in February 1930. With a cast composed entirely of Black actors, it ultimately ran 640 performances. This was followed by numerous flops, which established the Mansfield Theatre as a "jinx house". The Chanins ultimately lost control of the Mansfield and their other theaters during the Depression. In October 1931, the Chanins relinquished their lease on the Mansfield to Irving Lewine. At the end of the year, the Group Theatre began presenting its productions at the Mansfield, first staging 1931- and then The House of Connelly. The Mansfield did not host any productions from March to December 1932. The Mutual Life Insurance Company subsequently foreclosed on the theater, and it was purchased by Nyamco Associates Inc. in October 1932 for $354,000. In the foreclosure process, all the theater's furnishings were removed. The same month as Nyamco's acquisition, Ray K. Bartlett and Edgar Allen took over the Mansfield for two years and reinstalled the furnishings.

The Mansfield reopened in December 1932 with the Shuffle Along of 1933, which closed after just 17 performances. In June 1933, the theater was leased to the syndicate Players League Inc. for 19 months. The theater did not have any particularly distinguished shows in 1933 or 1934, but George Abbott directed the moderately successful comedy Page Miss Glory in late 1934. The next year, the Mansfield had a transfer of Moon Over Mulberry Street, as well as a run of On Stage with Osgood Perkins. This was followed in 1937 by Antony and Cleopatra featuring Tallulah Bankhead, as well as Behind Red Lights, which ran for 176 performances. In 1938, the Shuberts proposed leasing the Mansfield at $14,000 a year, an extremely favorable rate compared to other theaters; they ultimately took the theater for a year and renovated it. The theater then hosted a transfer of the long-running What a Life in 1939, as well as the Group Theatre's Thunder Rock featuring Lee J. Cobb and Frances Farmer.

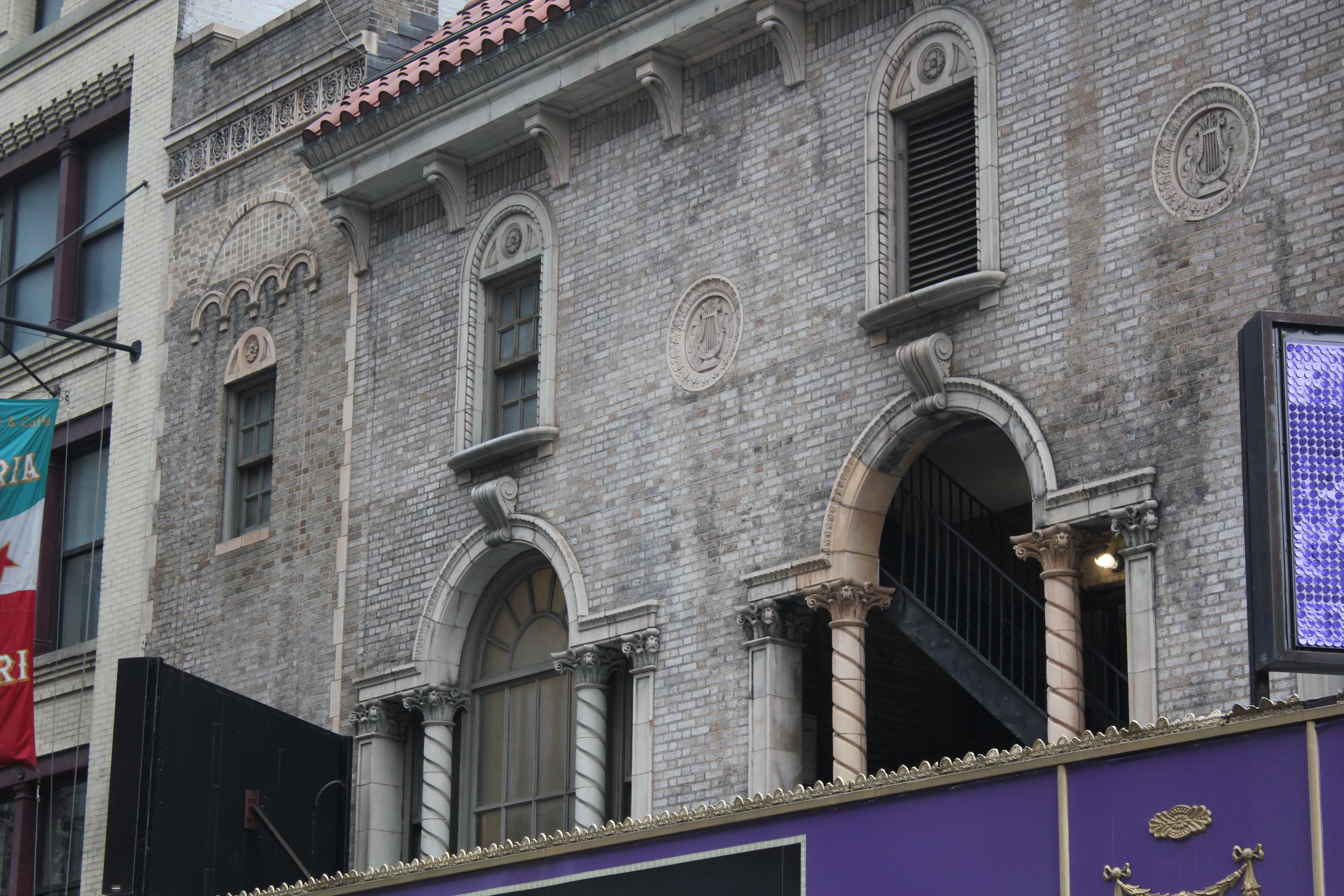
Side view of windows

In 1940, the Mansfield hosted a revival of Juno and the Paycock, a transfer of the long-running comedy Separate Rooms, and the popular revue Meet the People. The theater staged In Time to Come in 1941, as well as a revival of Shakespeare's As You Like It. The theater mostly hosted short runs during 1942 and 1943, and producer Michael Myerberg signed a three-year lease for the Mansfield in June 1943. The comedy Janie was staged at the Mansfield for a short period during late 1943 and early 1944. Myerberg bought the theater outright in March 1944, and Anna Lucasta, an adaptation of an American Negro Theater production, opened that August, starring Hilda Simms for 957 performances. The New York Herald Tribune said at the time that all-Black casts had performed the only two "outstanding hits" in the Mansfield's two-decade history: Anna Lucasta and The Green Pastures.

The Mansfield's next hit was Ruth Gordon's Years Ago, which opened in 1946 which ran for 206 performances. For the most part, the Mansfield hosted short runs during 1947. A revival of the musical The Cradle Will Rock opened at the end of that year and ran for two weeks. The Dublin Gate Theatre performed three shows at the Mansfield in February and March 1948, followed in April by the Billie Holiday Revue. The Mansfield's final productions of the decade included Red Gloves in 1948 and Lend an Ear in 1949. DuMont Television Network considered leasing the Mansfield during the 1949 season, but the Shuberts operated the theater instead when DuMont decided against using it. The Mansfield hosted All You Need Is One Good Break in February 1950, and the Jean Anouilh play Peacock ran just two performances that April.

=== CBS studio and renaming ===
The Columbia Broadcasting System (CBS) leased the Mansfield in August 1950 for five years, paying a very favorable annual rental of between $85,000 and $100,000. Ultimately, CBS used the theater for ten years. Known as CBS Studio 59, the theater was used to broadcast the long-running panel shows What's My Line? and I've Got a Secret. CBS also used the theater for shows such as Showcase, which showed actors in short clips. In 1958, Roger L. Stevens considered leasing the Mansfield Theatre from Myerberg, who still owned it.

Myerberg announced in mid-1960 that the former Mansfield Theatre would be renovated and reopened as a legitimate theater. The Mansfield was renamed after Brooks Atkinson, who had then recently retired as the theatrical critic for The New York Times. The Brooks Atkinson would be the first Broadway theater to be named for a theatre critic, as well as the second named for a newspaper writer, beside the Mark Hellinger Theatre. The theater was renamed at a ceremony on September 7, 1960.

=== Broadway revival ===
==== 1960s and 1970s ====
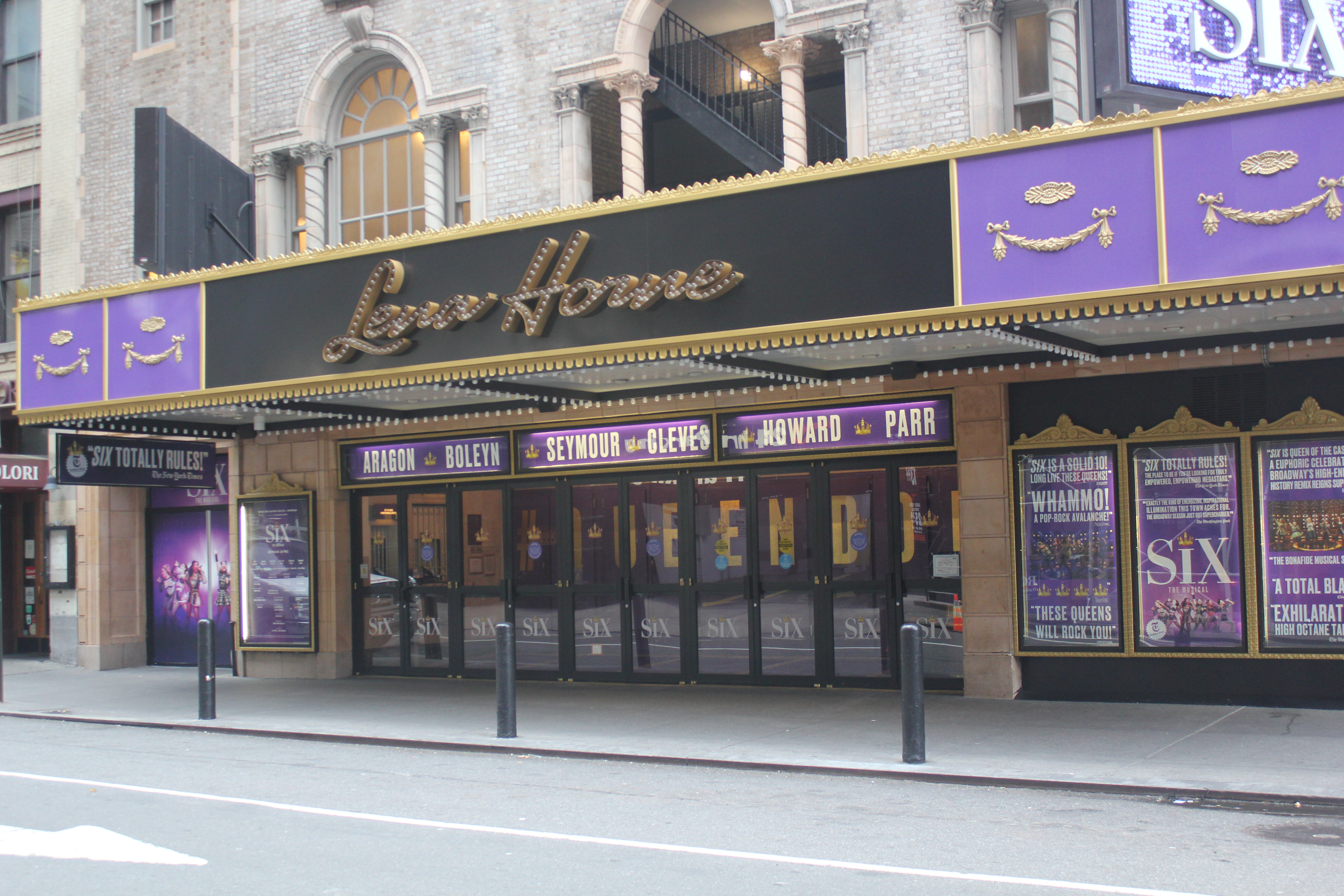
Entrance and marquee as viewed from across the street

The first production at the Brooks Atkinson was David Merrick's Vintage '60, which opened on September 12, 1960, and lasted just eight performances. This was followed the same year by Send Me No Flowers, which featured David Wayne and Nancy Olson for 40 performances. The next year, the theater hosted a success with Neil Simon's first play, Come Blow Your Horn, which ran for 677 performances. This was followed in late 1962 by Sidney Kingsley's Night Life and in 1963 by Peter Ustinov's Photo Finish. In early 1964, the Brooks Atkinson staged a five-performance run of Tennessee Williams's The Milk Train Doesn't Stop Here Anymore and solo appearances by Josephine Baker. The theater then hosted the controversial drama The Deputy, which ran for 318 performances for much of the same year. At the end of 1964, Julie Harris starred at the Brooks Atkinson in Ready When You Are, C.B.!; followed in 1965 by a 176-performance revival of The Glass Menagerie.

The Brooks Atkinson largely hosted flops for two years from November 1965 until Ustinov's Halfway Up the Tree opened in 1967. To combat the theater's unprofitability, the Nederlander Organization bought a half-interest in the Brooks Atkinson in May 1967. The next year, the Brooks Atkinson hosted Peter Nichols's A Day in the Death of Joe Egg, followed by Renée Taylor and Joseph Bologna's Lovers and Other Strangers. Subsequently, Dustin Hoffman appeared in Jimmy Shine during late 1968 and early 1969. The Brooks Atkinson did not see another hit until 1971, when Cliff Gorman starred in Lenny, a biography of Lenny Bruce that ran for 453 performances. The Negro Ensemble Company moved their off-Broadway production of The River Niger to the Brooks Atkinson in 1973, where it had 280 performances.

Myerberg died in early 1974 and the Nederlanders bought his half-interest in the Brooks Atkinson's ownership. Three successful productions were featured at the theater the same year: Find Your Way Home with Michael Moriarty and Jane Alexander; My Fat Friend with George Rose and Lynn Redgrave; and Of Mice and Men with James Earl Jones, Kevin Conway, and Pamela Blair. The two-character comedy Same Time, Next Year opened at the Brooks Atkinson in 1975. The theater celebrated its 50th anniversary in December 1976, ten months after the actual anniversary, because no one had noticed the date beforehand. Same Time, Next Year transferred to another theater in May 1978 and ultimately ran for over 1,400 total performances. The Brooks Atkinson then hosted the play Tribute with Jack Lemmon in 1978, as well as the comedy Bedroom Farce and the drama Teibele and Her Demon in 1979.

==== 1980s and 1990s ====
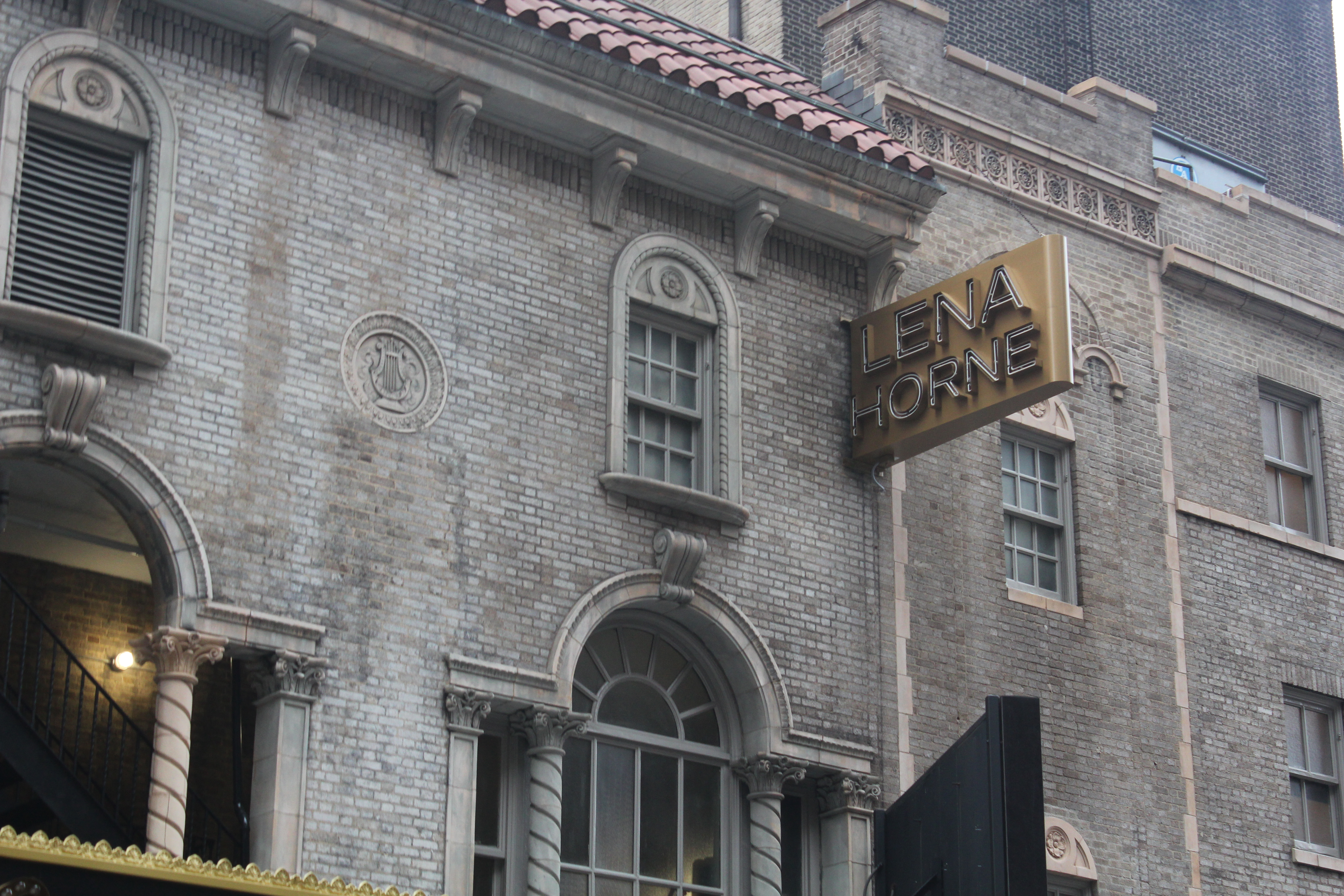
Lighted sign on the theater facade

The off-Broadway play Talley's Folly moved to the Brooks Atkinson in 1980. This was followed by four short runs: Tricks of the Trade and Mixed Couples in 1980, as well as Lolita and Wally's Cafe in 1981. The Dresser opened later in 1981 and ultimately ran 200 performances. This was followed in 1982 by a short run of the off-Broadway show Beyond Therapy, another revival of Ghosts with John Neville and Liv Ullmann, and the comedy Steaming with Judith Ivey. In 1983, the Brooks Atkinson hosted the mountain-climbing drama K2 as well as the solo show Edmund Kean with Ben Kingsley. At the end of 1983, the Brooks Atkinson staged Noises Off, which ran for one and a half years. Subsequently, Aren't We All? and Benefactors both opened at the Brooks Atkinson in 1985. This was followed in December 1986 by comedian Jackie Mason's solo show The World According to Me!. Mason's show ran for two years, with a gap in early 1988 when Mason was shooting the film Caddyshack II.

The New York City Landmarks Preservation Commission (LPC) had started to consider protecting the Brooks Atkinson as a landmark in 1982, with discussions continuing over the next several years. The LPC designated the Brooks Atkinson's facade and interior as landmarks on November 4, 1987. This was part of the commission's wide-ranging effort in 1987 to grant landmark status to Broadway theaters. The New York City Board of Estimate ratified the designations in March 1988. The Nederlanders, the Shuberts, and Jujamcyn collectively sued the LPC in June 1988 to overturn the landmark designations of 22 theaters, including the Brooks Atkinson, on the merit that the designations severely limited the extent to which the theaters could be modified. The lawsuit was escalated to the New York Supreme Court and the Supreme Court of the United States, but these designations were ultimately upheld in 1992.

The Brooks Atkinson staged Cafe Crown with Anne Jackson and Eli Wallach in 1989. The same year, the theater had limited appearances by musicians Victor Borge, Peter, Paul and Mary, and Stephanie Mills. This was followed in 1990 by a two-month-long run of The Cemetery Club and an adaptation of William Nicholson's Shadowlands with Jane Alexander and Nigel Hawthorne. The Brooks Atkinson hosted Death and the Maiden with Glenn Close, Richard Dreyfuss, and Gene Hackman in 1992, then the Roundabout Theatre Company's version of She Loves Me in 1993. The theater had two flops in the mid-1990s: Donald Margulies's What's Wrong With This Picture?, which ran for 12 performances in 1994, and Budd Schulberg and Stan Silverman's On the Waterfront, which had just eight performances in 1995.

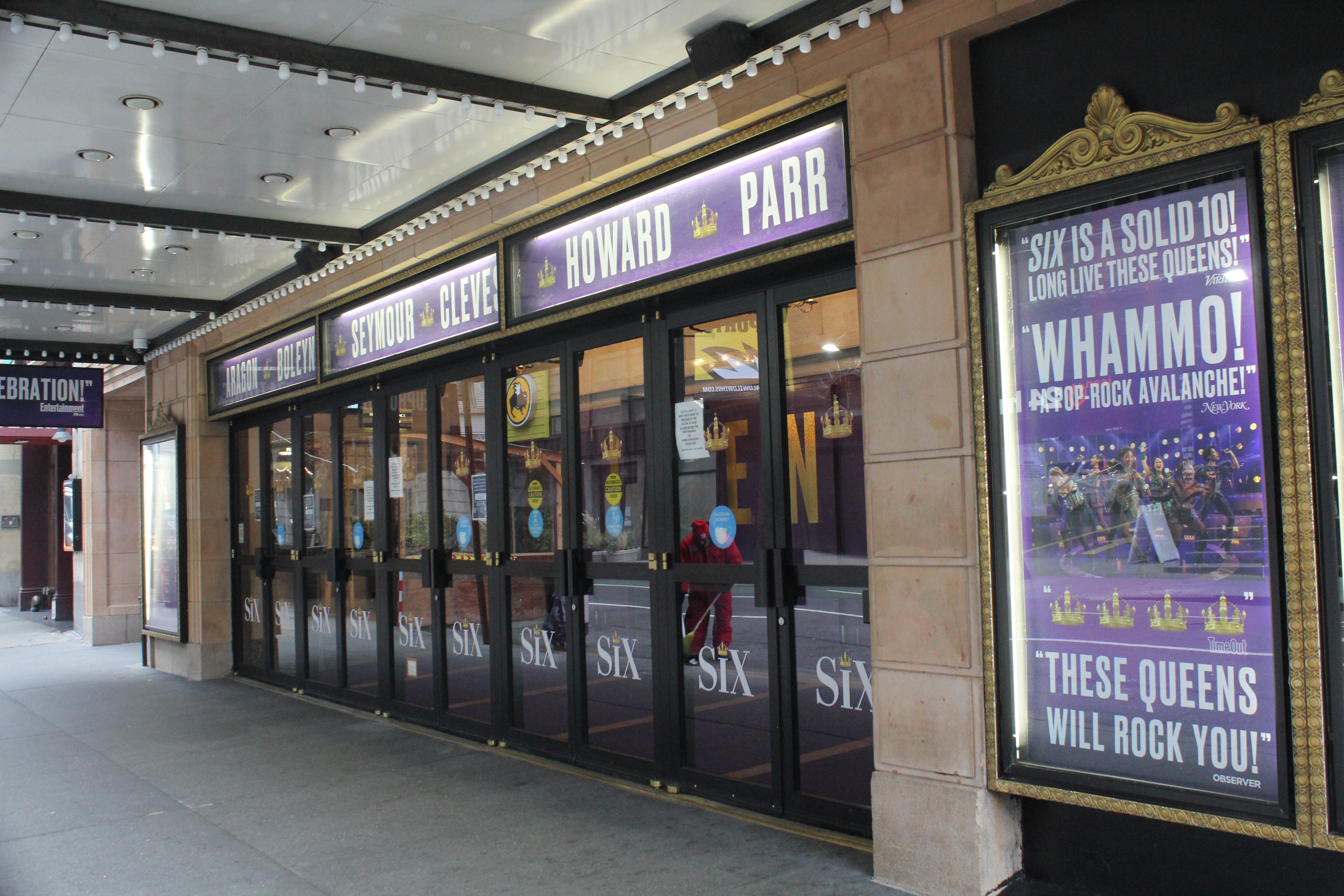
View from under the marquee

The Steppenwolf Theatre Company's production of Buried Child was produced at the Brooks Atkinson in 1996, as was the play Taking Sides with Daniel Massey and Ed Harris. The musical Play On! was hosted in 1997, followed the same year by the musical show Street Corner Symphony. The theatrical adaptation of Wait Until Dark, which featured film actress Marisa Tomei in her Broadway debut, ran for 97 performances in 1998. The next year, the theater hosted a transfer of a West End revival of The Iceman Cometh, featuring Kevin Spacey.

==== 2000s to present ====
In early 2000, the theater hosted the Roundabout Theatre Company's production of Uncle Vanya. From July to September of that year, Sachs Morgan Studio renovated the theater for $2.2 million. The original chandelier was retrieved from storage and reinstalled; the murals, lobbies, and restrooms were refurbished; and the seats, carpets, and drapes were replaced. The Brooks Atkinson reopened in December 2000 with the musical Jane Eyre, which closed after a short run. A late-2001 revival of Noises Off, two decades after the original production, ran for 348 performances. Next to be shown was a limited run of the tragedy Medea in 2002, as well as the revue The Look of Love and Jackie Mason's short-lived Laughing Room Only. The Brooks Atkinson hosted the dramas Jumpers and Democracy in 2004, as well as limited runs of the solo shows Mark Twain Tonight! and The Blonde in the Thunderbird in 2005.

A revival of The Odd Couple opened at the Brooks Atkinson in late 2005, followed by the dance musical The Times They Are a-Changin' in 2006 and a revival of A Moon for the Misbegotten in 2007. The rock-and-roll musical Grease was revived at the theater in August 2007, and the show ultimately ran for 554 performances over the next year and a half. It was immediately followed by a transfer of the off-Broadway rock musical Rock of Ages, which opened in April 2009 and ran for nearly two years before transferring. In the early 2010s, the Brooks Atkinson hosted both plays and musicals. These included Rain: A Tribute to the Beatles and Relatively Speaking in 2011; Peter and the Starcatcher in 2012; Hands on a Hardbody and After Midnight in 2013; and Love Letters in 2014. As part of a settlement with the United States Department of Justice in 2014, the Nederlanders agreed to improve disabled access at their nine Broadway theaters, including the Brooks Atkinson.

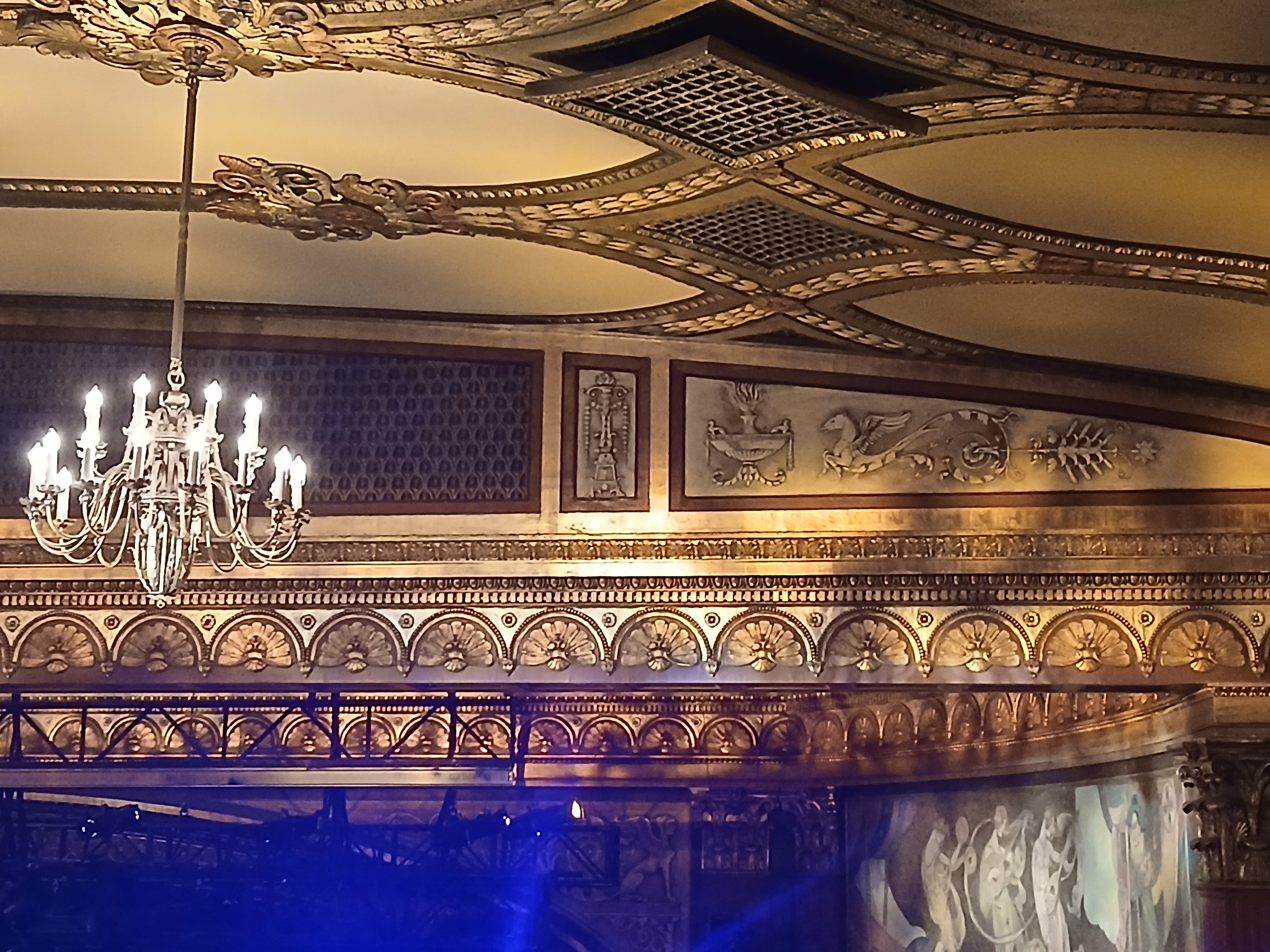
Ceiling and chandeliers, seen from balcony level

The Brooks Atkinson hosted the comedy It Shoulda Been You in 2015, as well as Deaf West Theatre's production of the musical Spring Awakening the same year. Subsequently, the musical Waitress opened in 2016, with Sara Bareilles and Jason Mraz both performing. Waitress became the Brooks Atkinson's longest-running production in 2019, and it ran through January 5, 2020, with 1,544 performances.

The musical Six was in rehearsal and was set to open on March 12, 2020, when all Broadway theaters were forced to close due to the COVID-19 pandemic; Six premiered when the Brooks Atkinson reopened on September 17, 2021. During the COVID-19 shutdown, the Shuberts, Nederlanders, and Jujamcyn had pledged to increase racial and cultural diversity in their theaters, including naming at least one theater for a Black theatrical personality. Accordingly, in June 2022, the Nederlanders announced that the Brooks Atkinson would be renamed for singer and actress Lena Horne. Horne's collaborative relationship with the Nederlanders included the Broadway production of Lena Horne: The Lady and Her Music in 1981, for which she won a Tony and two Grammy awards. The venue became the first Broadway theater named for a Black woman, as well as the third Broadway theater named after a Black theatrical personality. (Note: The August Wilson Theatre was renamed after playwright August Wilson in 2005, and the James Earl Jones Theatre was renamed after actor James Earl Jones in early 2022.) The Lena Horne's new marquee was unveiled on November 1, 2022. Six surpassed Waitress as the theater's longest-running show in June 2025 and is is scheduled to close in January 2027 after 2,178 performances. This will be followed by the Broadway premiere of Dirty Dancing: The Musical, which is scheduled to open in March 2027 and is scheduled to run through September 2027.

== Notable productions ==
Productions are listed by the year of their first performance. This list only includes Broadway shows; it does not include shows taped at the theater.

Notable productions at the theater
Opening year	Name	Refs.
1926	Beyond the Horizon	
1926	The Dybbuk	
1927	Ghosts	
1928	Present Arms	
1928	Chee-Chee	
1930	The Green Pastures	
1931	The House of Connelly	
1932	Shuffle Along (1933)	
1934	Page Miss Glory	
1936	Black Limelight	
1937	Sea Legs	
1937	Antony and Cleopatra	
1939	What a Life	
1939	Thunder Rock	
1940	Juno and the Paycock	
1940	Meet the People	
1941	As You Like It	
1944	Anna Lucasta	
1947	The Cradle Will Rock	
1948	John Bull's Other Island	
1948	Red Gloves	
1949	Lend an Ear	
1961	Come Blow Your Horn	
1963	Phèdre	
1963	Bérénice	
1963	Man and Boy	
1964	The Milk Train Doesn't Stop Here Anymore	
1964	The Deputy	
1965	The Glass Menagerie	
1967	Love in E-Flat	
1967	A Minor Adjustment	
1967	Halfway Up the Tree	
1968	A Day in the Death of Joe Egg	
1968	Lovers and Other Strangers	
1969	Indians	
1970	Paris Is Out!	
1970	Charley's Aunt	
1970	Not Now, Darling	
1971	Lenny	
1972	Lysistrata	
1973	The River Niger	
1974	My Fat Friend	
1974	Of Mice and Men	
1975	Same Time, Next Year	
1978	Tribute	
1979	Bedroom Farce	
1980	Talley's Folly	
1981	Lolita	
1981	The Dresser	
1982	Beyond Therapy	
1982	Ghosts	
1982	Steaming	
1983	K2	
1983	Edmund Kean	
1983	Noises Off	
1985	Aren't We All?	
1985	Benefactors	
1986	Rowan Atkinson at the Atkinson	
1986	Jackie Mason's The World According to Me!	
1989	Cafe Crown	
1989	The Victor Borge Holiday Show on Broadway	
1989	Peter, Paul & Mary "A Holiday Celebration"	
1989	Stephanie Mills Comes "Home" to Broadway	
1990	The Cemetery Club	
1990	Shadowlands	
1992	Death and the Maiden	
1993	Redwood Curtain	
1993	She Loves Me	
1996	Buried Child	
1996	Taking Sides	
1997	Play On!	
1998	Wait Until Dark	
1998	Fool Moon	
1999	The Iceman Cometh	
1999	The Rainmaker	
2000	Uncle Vanya	
2000	Jane Eyre	
2001	Noises Off	
2002	Medea	
2003	The Look of Love	
2004	Jumpers	
2004	Democracy	
2005	Mark Twain Tonight!	
2005	The Odd Couple	
2006	The Times They Are a-Changin'	
2007	A Moon for the Misbegotten	
2007	Grease	
2009	Rock of Ages	
2011	Rain: A Tribute to the Beatles	
2011	Relatively Speaking	
2012	Peter and the Starcatcher	
2013	Hands on a Hardbody	
2013	After Midnight	
2014	Love Letters	
2015	It Shoulda Been You	
2015	Spring Awakening	
2016	Waitress	
2021	Six	
2027	Dirty Dancing: The Musical	

== Box office record ==
Waitress set a box office record for the theater in 2018, grossing $1,626,478 over eight performances for the week ending on January 28, 2018. This was surpassed by Six, which grossed $1,649,206 over eight performances for the week ending January 1, 2023.

== See also ==
- List of Broadway theaters
- List of New York City Designated Landmarks in Manhattan from 14th to 59th Streets
