= Sven Relander =

Finnish actor (1897–1956)

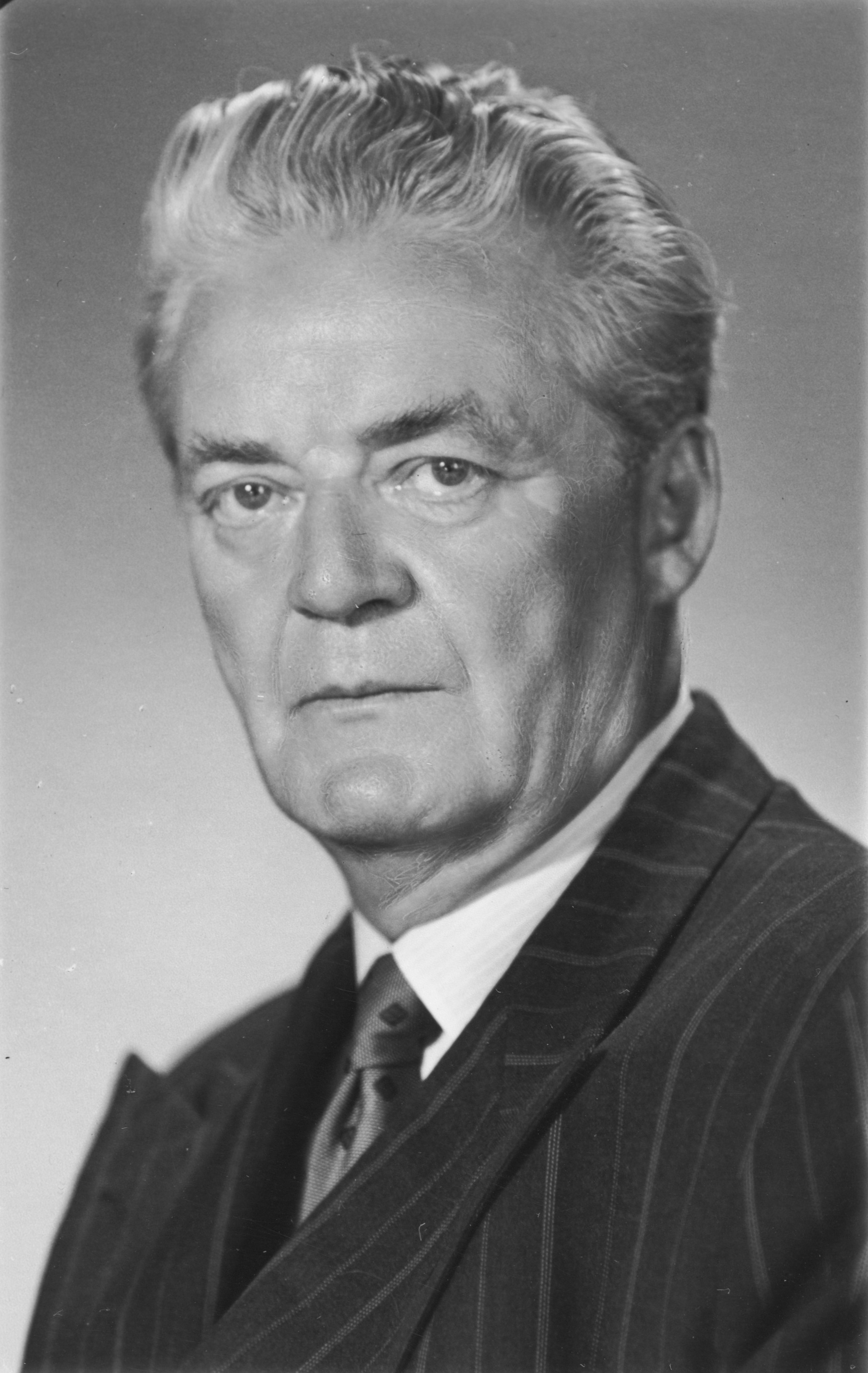
- Relander in 1954
- Born: 24 May 1897; Helsinki, Finland
- Died: 13 August 1956 (aged 59); Helsinki, Finland
- Occupation: Actor
- Years active: 1923–1956

Sven Relander (24 May 1897 – 13 August 1956) was a Finnish stage and film actor.

== Selected filmography ==
- The Village Shoemakers (1923)
- False Greta (1934)
- North Express (1947)
- The Girl from Moon Bridge (1953)

== Bibliography ==
- Olsoni, Eric: Från Strindberg till Anouilh: Hundra teateraftnar i Helsingfors. Söderström, 1964.
