= Eemeli (comedian) =

Finnish actor, comedian and entertainer

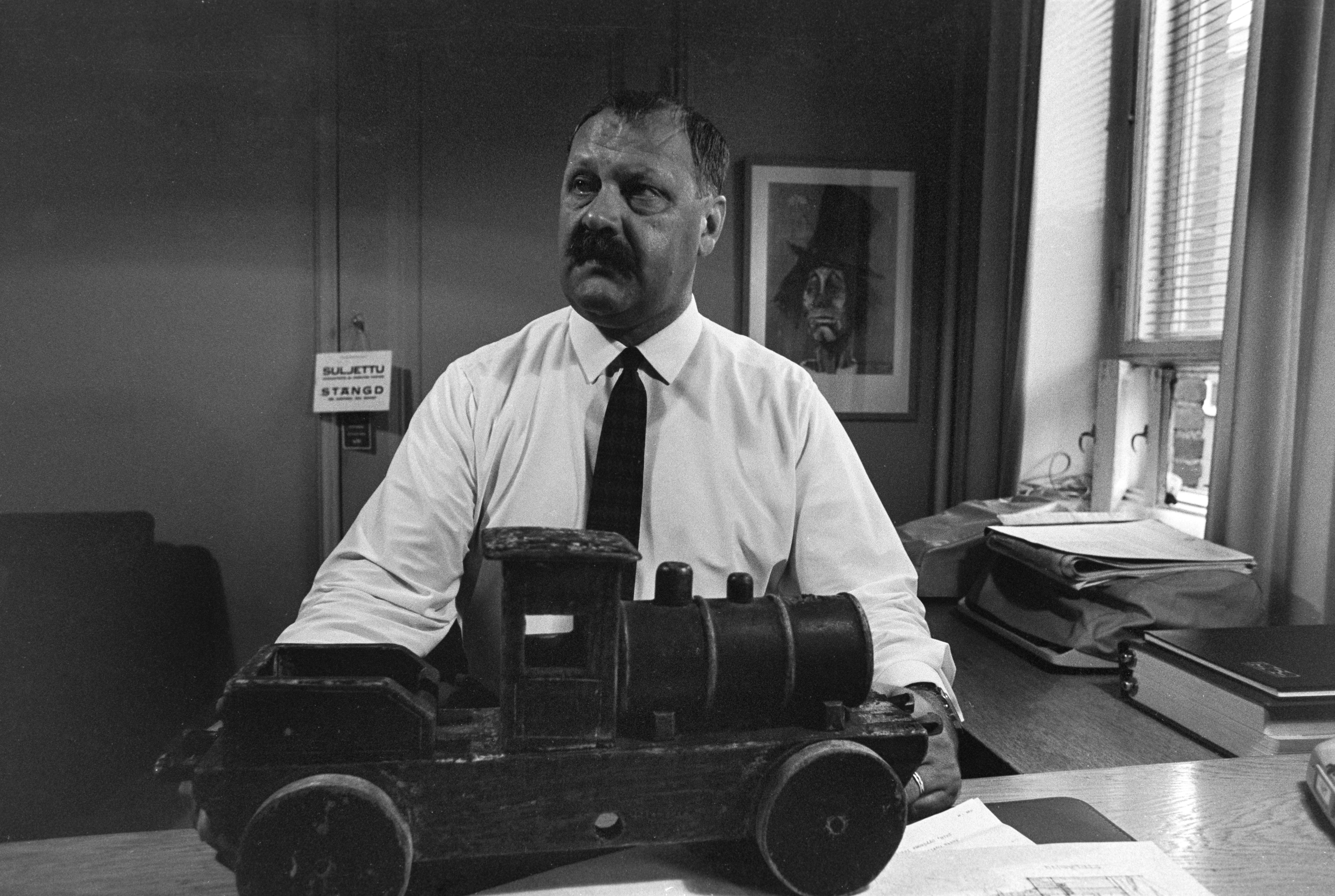
- Eemeli in 1969
- Born: Esko Olavi Toivonen; 28 June 1920; Helsinki, Finland
- Died: 9 November 1987 (aged 67); Helsinki, Finland
- Other names: Eemeli
- Occupation(s): actor, comedian, entertainer
- Years active: 1956–1984

Esko Olavi Toivonen, better known by his stage name Eemeli (28 June 1920 – 9 November 1987) was a Finnish actor, comedian and entertainer. He was dubbed "the Buster Keaton of Finland" due to his deadpan expression.

== Filmography ==
- Suuri sävelparaati (1959)
- Yks' tavallinen Virtanen (1959)
- Oho, sanoi Eemeli (1960)
- Kaks' tavallista Lahtista (1960)
- Kankkulan kaivolla (1960)
- Molskis, sanoi Eemeli, molskis! (1960)
- Mullin mallin (1961)
- Voi veljet, mikä päivä! (1961)
- ”Ei se mitään!” sanoi Eemeli (1962)
- Tup-akka-lakko (1980)

== Discography ==
=== Singles ===
- Oho, sanoi Eemeli / Taas Rovaniemen markkinoilla (Rytmi R 6386, 1959)
- Humppafoksi / Sahara (Rytmi R 6418, 1960)
- Tanssit Tippavaarassa (Rytmi R 6465, 1961), B-side by Jorma Lyytinen and Pärre Förars
- Syntymäpäivät Tippavaarassa / Tippäjärven vesj (Rytmi R 6496, 1962)
- Tukkijätkän twist / Susijahti (Rytmi R 6510, 1962)
- Saukkosen avioero (Rytmi R 6524, 1962), B-side by Ragni Malmsten
- Eemelin saunassa / Onko sulla sellaista (Fontana 271560, 1963), with Repe Helismaa
- Humppa humppa humppa tättärää / Palokuntajuhlat (Rytmi R 6546, 1964)
- Eemeli ja torvi (Rytmi R 6551, 1964), B-side by Tapio Rautavaara
- Eemeli ja Severi / Eemelin heilat (Rytmi R 6563, 1966), with Esa Pakarinen
- Kovat paikat 1 / Kovat paikat 2 (Rytmi R 6572, 1967)
- Mustalaisromanssi / Tytön tavarat (Rytmi RM 101, 1968)
- Syntymäpäivät / Vähän ennen kymmentä (Odeon 5E 006 34233, 1970)
- Vaarin luona / Myyrä (Odeon 5E 006 34413, 1971)
- Mulla menee hitaasti / Sisään vaan (JP-Musiikki JPS 1031, 1980)

=== EPs ===
- Eemelin Eepee (Rytmi RN 4158, 1958)
- Kolme Eemeliä (Rytmi RN 4166, 1959)
- Oho, sanoi Eemeli (Rytmi RN 4210, 1960)
- Kotimaisia elokuvasävelmiä 4: Kankkulan kaivolla (Rytmi RN 4216, 1960)
- Repe & Eemeli (Rytmi RN 4220, 1960)
- Huumoria: Repe & Eemeli (Rytmi RN 4241, 1962)
- Huumoria 2: Repe & Eemeli (Rytmi RN 4250, 1962)

=== Albums ===
- Eemeli (Sävel SÄLP 630, 1966)
- Eemeli Pinnalla (Columbia 5E 06234097, 1970)
- Esa & Eemeli (Rytmi RILP 7092, 1972)
- Eemelin joulukierre (Odeon 5E 05434730, 1972)
- Eemeli (Mars MK 166, 1981, as cassette)
- 20 suosikkia – Oho! sano Eemeli (compilation album)
- Tangolla päähän – Kootut levytykset 1970–1972 (2010, compilation album)
