= False Greta =

1934 Finnish-Swedish comedy film

- Directed by: John W. Brunius; Pauline Brunius
- Written by: Oscar Hemberg
- Produced by: Lennart Hamberg
- Starring: Adolf Jahr; Karin Albihn; Isa Quensel
- Cinematography: Harry Hasso
- Music by: Tapio Ilomäki; Karl Wehle
- Production companies: Film Union; Oy Finlandia-Film
- Distributed by: Columbia Film; Oy Finlandia-Film
- Release date: 4 February 1934
- Running time: 93 minutes
- Countries: Finland; Sweden
- Language: Swedish

False Greta (Swedish: Falska Greta) is a 1934 Finnish-Swedish comedy film directed by John W. Brunius and Pauline Brunius and starring Adolf Jahr, Karin Albihn and Isa Quensel. It was shot at studios in Helsinki and on location in Stockholm. It is now considered to be a lost film.

== Synopsis ==
Greta Gustafsson, a young typist, wins a prize in a competition and heads out to a fashionable seaside resort. She is mistaken for the Hollywood star Greta Garbo who it has been announced is returning to her native Sweden to spend her holiday incognito.

== Cast ==
- Adolf Jahr as Ove Häger
- Karin Albihn as Greta Gustafsson
- Karl-Ewert Christenson as Count Axel von Rexdorff
- Isa Quensel as Lisa
- Mok Björnson-Langen as Mrs. Eva Bromeé
- Sigge Fürst as Karlsson
- Sven Relander as Mr. Grönroos
- Agnes Lindh as Mrs. Lalla Grönroos
- May Pihlgren as Miss Singoalla Grönroos
- John W. Brunius as Habercorn
- Georg Rydeberg as A man

== Bibliography ==
- Sadoul, Georges. Dictionary of Film Makers. University of California Press, 1972.
