= Kaks' tavallista Lahtista =

1960 Finnish film

- Directed by: Ville Salminen
- Written by: Reino Helismaa
- Produced by: T. J. Särkkä
- Starring: Tommi Rinne; Leif Wager
- Cinematography: Kalle Peronkoski
- Edited by: Elmer Lahti; Armas Vallasvuo
- Release date: 20 May 1960
- Running time: 85 minutes
- Country: Finland
- Language: Finnish

Kaks' tavallista Lahtista (lit. 'Two Ordinary Lahtinens') is a 1960 Finnish musical comedy-drama film directed by Ville Salminen. It was entered into the 10th Berlin International Film Festival, but received low reception.

== Cast ==
- Eemeli as Janitor Vepsäläinen
- Vesa Enne as Janitor's son
- Hannu Halonen
- Paavo Hukkinen
- Pentti Irjala as Producer
- Leo Jokela as Champion's assistant
- Maija Karhi as Irma Virtanen
- Leni Katajakoski as Eeva
- Annikki Linnoila
- Oiva Luhtala as sergeant
- Toivo Mäkelä as Managing clerk Puntti
- Pirkko Mannola as Pirkko Järvinen
- Aili Montonen
- Masa Niemi
- Tommi Rinne as Usko Lahtinen
- Ville-Veikko Salminen as European champion
- Pentti Viljanen as manager Mainio
- Leif Wager as Toivo Lahtinen
