= Liisa Tuomi =

Finnish actress

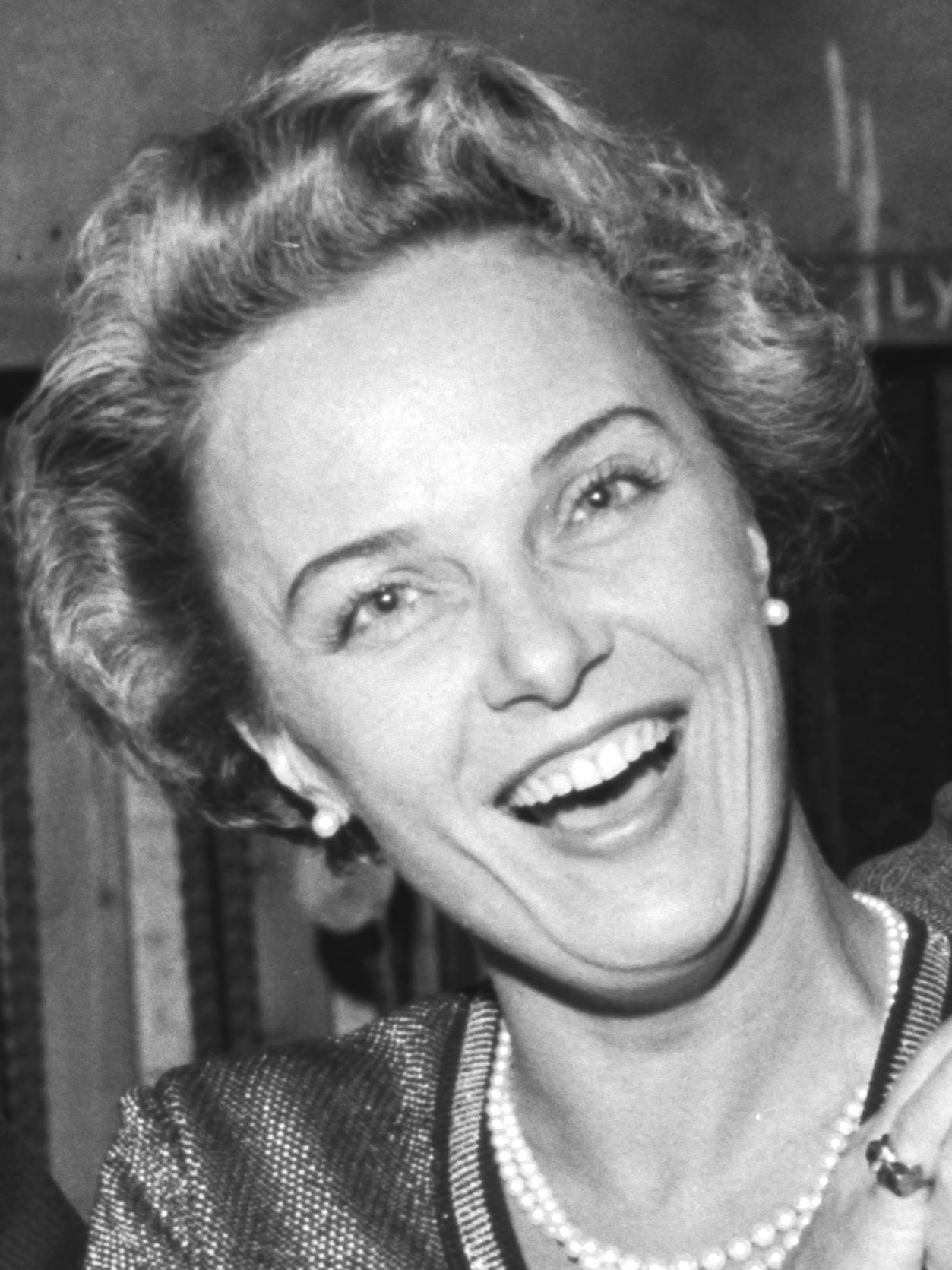
- With Joel Rinne in a 1963 stage production.
- Born: 17 June 1924; Viipuri, Finland
- Died: 4 January 1989 (aged 64); Helsinki, Finland
- Occupation: Actress
- Years active: 1940-1972 (film)

Liisa Tuomi (1924–1989) was a Finnish stage, film and television actress.

== Selected filmography ==
- North Express (1947)

== Bibliography ==
- Qvist, Per Olov & von Bagh, Peter. Guide to the Cinema of Sweden and Finland. Greenwood Publishing Group, 2000.
