= Leif Wager =

Finnish actor (1922–2002)

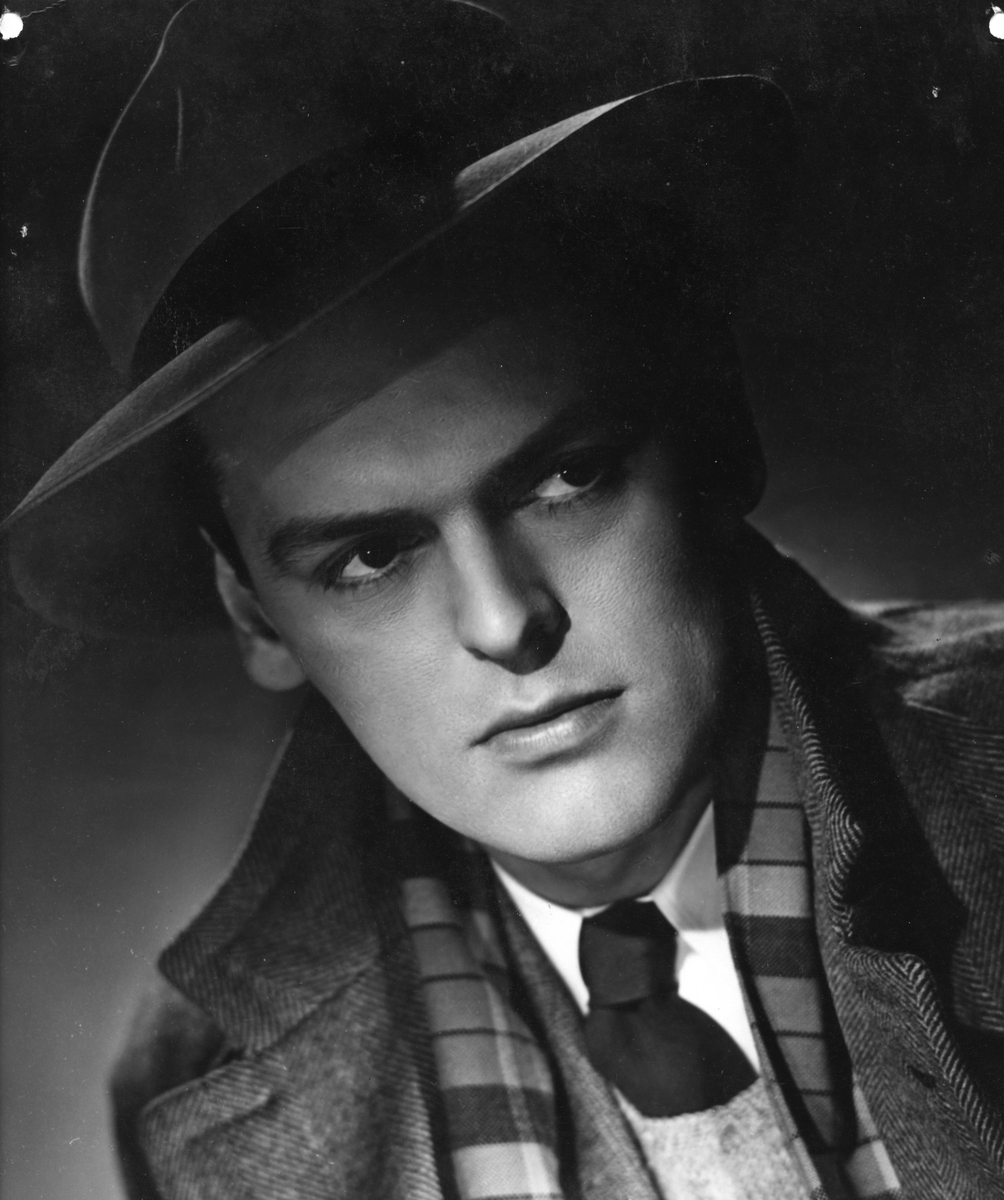
- Born: 11 February 1922; Helsinki, Finland
- Died: 23 March 2002 (aged 80); Helsinki, Finland
- Occupation: Actor
- Years active: 1940–2001

Leif Christian Wager (11 February 1922 – 23 March 2002) was a Finnish actor. He appeared in 75 films and television shows between 1940 and 2001. He starred in the film Kaks' tavallista Lahtista, which was entered into the 10th Berlin International Film Festival.

He is buried in the Hietaniemi Cemetery in Helsinki.

== Selected filmography ==
- North Express (1947)
- A Night in Rio (1951)
- Island Girl (1953)
- Shamrock (1953)
- Sven Tuuva the Hero (1958)
- Kaks' tavallista Lahtista (1960)
- The Headquarters (1970)
- Hobitit (1993)
