= Fenno-Filmi =

Finnish film production company

- Industry: Motion pictures
- Founded: 1942
- Founder: Yrjö Norta, Theodor Luts
- Defunct: 1950

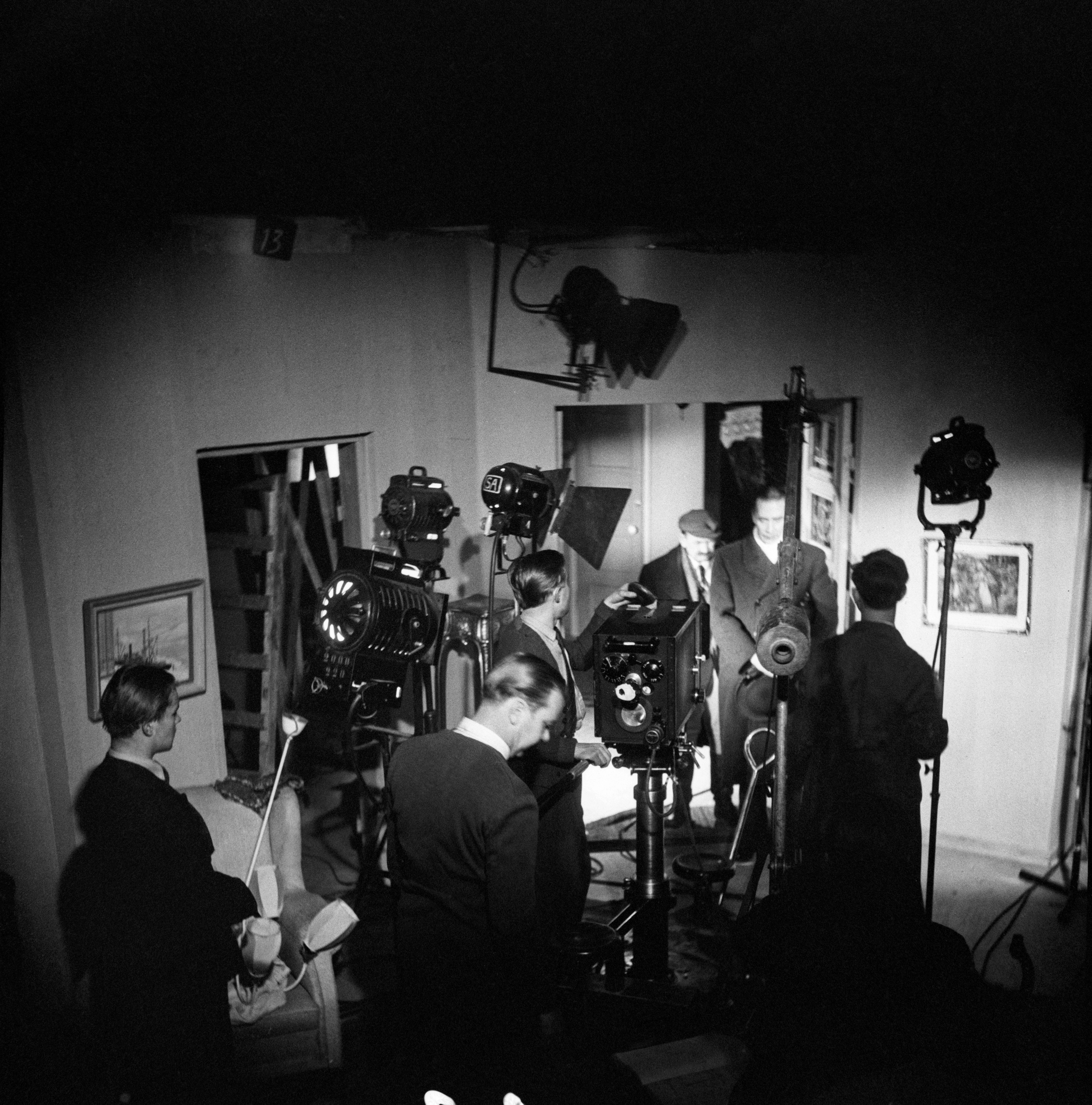
Fenno-Filmi Company shooting film in a studio, 1947

Fenno-Filmi was a Finnish film production company. The company was founded by film directors Yrjö Norta and Theodor Luts in 1942.

== Overview ==
Luts and Erkki Uotila were the co-directors of the first Fenno-Filmi production Salainen ase which premiered on 3 January 1943. Erehtyneet sydämet was released in April 1944, with Uotila and Eero Leväluoma sharing the director's credits. Later that year, Yrjö Norta directed a film Hiipivä vaara. Norta directed five of Fenno-Filmi's 18 films.

Roland af Hällström made his first Fenno-Filmi effort Houkutuslintu in 1946. He soon became the head director for the company, a position which he later kept in Fennada-Filmi as well. Edvin Laine, Jorma Nortimo and Teuvo Tulio were some of the other directors who worked for Fenno-Filmi.

== Merger ==
The company was not able to produce commercially successful films and suffered from financial problems since the beginning. When Mauno Mäkelä became the head of the company in 1949, efforts were made to merge the productions of Fenno-Filmi and Adams Filmi. This happened in 1950, and the new company was named Fennada-Filmi. The Finnish Broadcasting Company has been holding the rights to the Fenno-Filmi productions since 1982.

== Films produced ==
- Salainen ase (1943)
- Maskotti (1943)
- Varjoja Kannaksella (1943)
- Erehtyneet sydämet (1944)
- Hiipivä vaara (1944')
- Suviyön salaisuus (1945)
- Sinä olet kohtaloni (1945)
- Matkalla seikkailuun (1945)
- Kyläraittien kuningas (1945)
- Houkutuslintu (1946)
- Kultainen kynttilänjalka (1946)
- Sisulla ja sydämellä (1947)
- Pikajuna pohjoiseen (1947)
- Läpi usvan (1948)
- Keittiökavaljeerit (1949)
- Hornankoski (1949)
- Vain kaksi tuntia (1949)
- Hallin Janne (1950)

== Sources ==
- Mäkelä, Mauno (1996). Kerrankin hyvä kotimainen: elokuvatuottajan muistelmat. Porvoo, Helsinki, Juva: WSOY. ISBN 951-0-20956-2.
- Bagh, Peter von (1992). Suomalaisen elokuvan kultainen kirja. Helsinki: Otava. ISBN 951-1-12295-9.
- Elonet.fi – Fenno-Filmi
