= Tommi Rinne =

Finnish actor (1925–1999)

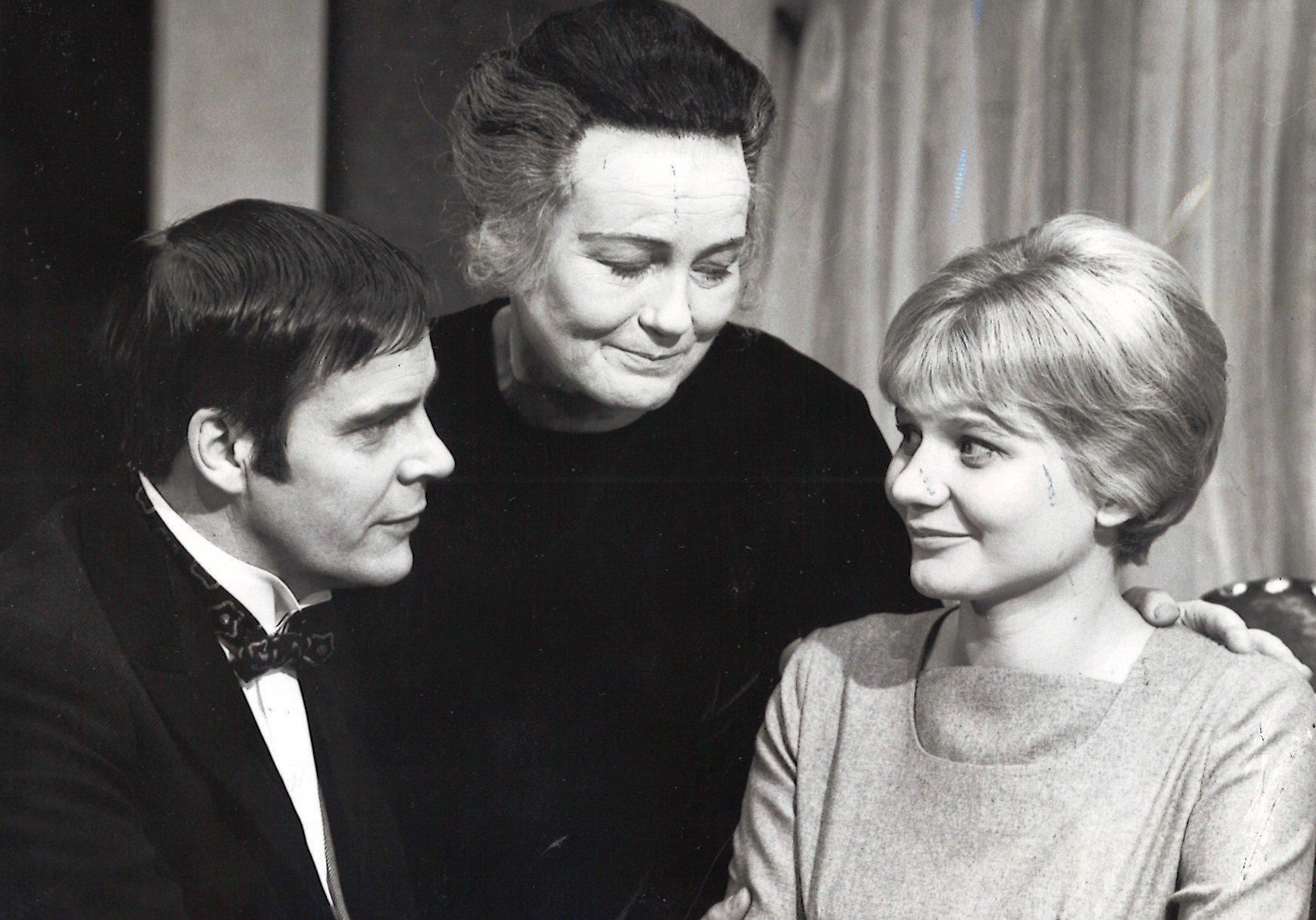
- Tommi Rinne. Emma Väänänen and Ritva Oksanen in a 1965 production of Easter.
- Born: 21 January 1925; Oulu, Finland
- Died: 10 June 1999 (aged 74); Helsinki, Finland
- Occupation: Actor
- Years active: 1946–1998

Tommi Jalmari Rinne (21 January 1925 – 10 June 1999) was a Finnish actor. He appeared in 76 films and television shows between 1946 and 1998. He starred in the film Kaks' tavallista Lahtista, which was entered into the 10th Berlin International Film Festival.

== Selected filmography ==
- Caught and Held Fast... (1955)
- Tweet, Tweet (1958)
- Sven Tuuva the Hero (1958)
- Kaks' tavallista Lahtista (1960)
