= Abel Adams =

Finnish film producer (1879–1938)

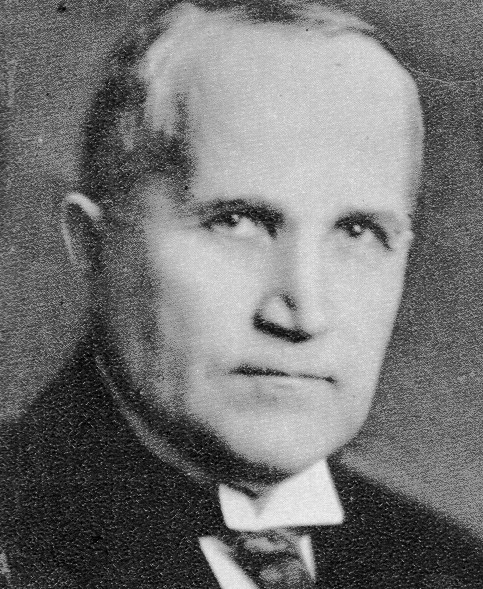
- Born: 14 March 1879; Karttula, Finland
- Died: 14 July 1938 (aged 59); Helsinki, Finland

Abel Adams (born Aapeli Korhonen, 14 March 1879 – 14 July 1938) was a Finnish film producer and the founder of Adams Filmi. He was born in Karttula and, in the 1930s, ran the largest chain of cinemas in Finland. After his death in Helsinki in 1938, Adams Filmi stopped producing films for ten years.

== Filmography ==
- Meren ja lemmen aallot (1926)
- Taistelu Heikkilän talosta (1936)
- Nuorena nukkunut (1937)
- Kiusaus (1938)
