= Island Girl (film) =

- Directed by: Armand Lohikoski
- Written by: Kaarlo Nuorvala
- Produced by: Mauno Mäkelä
- Starring: Mirja Mane; Leif Wager; Henake Schubak
- Cinematography: Esko Töyri
- Edited by: Nils Holm
- Music by: George de Godzinsky
- Production company: Fennada-Filmi
- Distributed by: Adams Filmi
- Release date: 30 January 1953
- Running time: 90 minutes
- Country: Finland
- Language: Finnish

Island Girl (Finnish: Saariston tyttö) is a 1953 Finnish romance film directed by Roland af Hällström and starring Mirja Mane, Leif Wager and Henake Schubak.

== Cast ==
- Mirja Mane as Liisa
- Leif Wager as Antti
- Henake Schubak as Peter
- Sirkka Saarnio as Maija
- Anton Soini as Masa (accordion player)
- Toivo Hämeranta as Simeon
- Elvi Saarnio as Martta
- Joel Asikainen as Gentleman buying fish
- Saara Ranin as Hanna
- Irja Kuusla as Saara
- Ale Porkka as Mikko
- Enok Väänänen as Lennu
- Matti Aulos as Coast Guard captain

== Bibliography ==
- Tad Bentley Hammer. International film prizes: an encyclopedia. Garland, 1991.
