= Shamrock (film) =

Kolmiapila
- Directed by: Roland af Hällström; Kyllikki Forssell; Esko Töyri
- Written by: Kaarlo Nuorvala
- Produced by: Mauno Mäkelä
- Starring: Eeva-Kaarina Volanen; Leif Wager; Tauno Palo; Leena Häkinen
- Cinematography: Esko Töyri; Unto Kumpulainen
- Music by: Tauno Pylkkänen
- Production company: Fennada-Filmi
- Release date: 3 April 1953
- Running time: 80 minutes
- Country: Finland
- Language: Finnish

Kolmiapila (Shamrock) is a Finnish anthology film released in 1953. It consists of three episodes: Marja's Story, A Happy Family, and Eeva's Tale. The film explores themes of parenthood and childlessness, addressing the challenges they present and their resolutions. Directed by Roland af Hällström, Kyllikki Forssell, and Esko Töyri, it marked Kyllikki Forssell's sole film as a director and her place as the third woman to direct a Finnish feature film.

The episodes vary in tone and content, with the first portraying the harsh realities of a factory worker, the second taking a comedic approach to parents who idolize their child, and the third revolving around a singer's seductive influence over an innocent girl.

== Cast ==
| Actor | Role |
|---|---|
| Eeva-Kaarina Volanen | Eeva, Olavi's wife |
| Leif Wager | Jorma, songwriter Lauri Salla |
| Tauno Palo | Olavi, doctor |
| Leena Häkinen | Marja |
| Jussi Jurkka | Janne |
| Sirkka-Liisa Wilén | Irmeli, Olli's wife |
| Matti Ranin | Olli, a student |
| Irma Seikkula | Orphanage director |
| Laina Laine | Jorma's mother |
| Rakel Laakso | Eedla, caretaker's wife |
| Arto Mäkelä | Arvo, Marja's brother |
| Rauha Rentola | Kaisu |
| Salli Karuna | Lady Laura Virranheimo |
| Elli Ylimaa | Child protection board inspector |
| Birgitta Ulfsson | Nervous mother |

== Reception ==
The film was praised by critic Arto Pajukallio as an intriguing commentary from a time when concepts like rainbow families and single-parent households were unfamiliar. However, some, such as a reviewer in Tv-maailma, found its message overly preachy and dramatic.
