= Adams Filmi =

Finnish film production company

Adams-Filmi
- Industry: Motion pictures
- Founded: 1912
- Key people: Abel Adams, Felicia Adams

Adams Filmi Oy (previously Adamsin Filmitoimisto) was a Finnish film production company. Founded in 1912 by Abel Adams (1879–1938), the company was later merged with Fenno-Filmi which eventually became Fennada-Filmi. The Finnish Broadcasting Company bought Fennada-Filmi in 1982. In 1986, Adams Filmi ceased to exist when it merged with O.Y. Kinosto and Ky Kino Savoy to form Finnkino.

After Abel Adams suddenly died in 1938, his wife became the head of the company. Their daughter Felicia Adams took over the charge in 1958. Valuable film material was lost in a fire in 1959, including three early films by Teuvo Tulio.

== Sources ==
- "ELONET – Adams Filmi Oy". KAVA.
- Karjalainen, Jussi. "Felicia Adams – Muistokirjoitus – Muistot – HS.fi". Helsingin Sanomat.
- Uusitalo, Kari. "Adams, Abel (1879–1938) | Biografiakeskus, Suomalaisen Kirjallisuuden Seura". Biografiakeskus, Suomalaisen Kirjallisuuden Seura.
