= Yrjö Norta =

Finnish film director, screenwriter, editor, cinematographer and sound editor

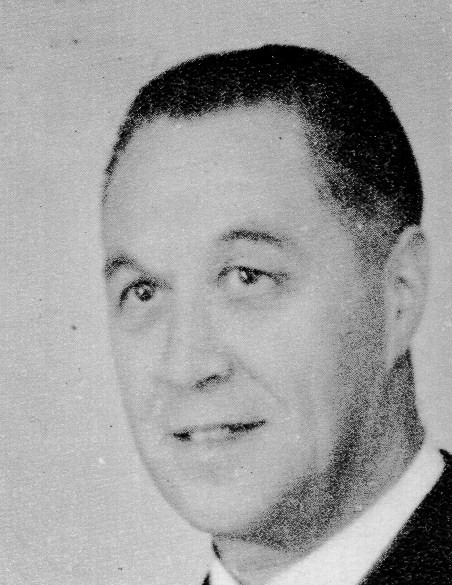

Yrjö Norta (originally Nyberg, 18 March 1904 – 11 November 1988) was a Finnish film director, screenwriter, editor, cinematographer and sound editor. Occasionally he used the pseudonyms Georg Nyberg and Ilmari Waltamaa. He was also the production manager and one of the founders of the film production company Fenno-Filmi.

== Selected filmography as a director ==
- Pohjalaisia (1936)
- Lapatossu (1937)
- Kuin uni ja varjo (1937)
- Tulitikkuja lainaamassa (1938)
- Olenko minä tullut haaremiin (1938)
- Yövartija vain... (1940)
- Runon kuningas ja muuttolintu (1940)
