= Red Gloves =

Red Gloves is a play by Jean-Paul Sartre. It appeared on Broadway in 1948 in a production adapted by Daniel Taradash and starring John Dall, Joan Tetzel, and Charles Boyer.

It was originally called Crime Passionel. Jed Harris directed the Broadway production.

Sartre successfully sued the producers of the adaptation, fearing--unjustly, according to Harris--that it had become “a vulgar, common melodrama with an anti-Communist bias."
