= Dirty Hands =

Play by Jean-Paul Sartre

- Original language: French
- Written by: Jean-Paul Sartre
- Genre: Political drama
- Setting: Illyria

Premiere
- Date: 2 April 1948
- Place: Theatre Antoine, Paris

Dirty Hands (French: Les Mains sales) is a play by Jean-Paul Sartre. It was first performed on 2 April 1948 at the Theatre Antoine in Paris, directed by Pierre Valde, and starring François Périer, Marie Olivier, and André Luguet.

A political drama set in the fictional country of Illyria between 1943 and 1945, the story is about the assassination of a leading politician. The story is told mainly in the form of a flashback, with the killer describing how he carried out his mission. The killer's identity is established from the beginning, but the question is whether his motivations were political or personal. Thus, the play's main theme is not on who did it but on why it was done.

== Plot ==
The play is set in Illyria, a fictional Eastern European country, during the latter stages of World War II. (Illyria was an actual country of classical antiquity, whose territory included modern Albania, North Macedonia, Kosovo, Greece, Serbia and surroundings.) The country, an ally of Nazi Germany, is on the verge of being annexed to the Eastern Bloc.

A young Communist, Hugo Barine, is told that Hoederer, a party leader, has proposed talks with non-Socialist groups, including the Fascist government and the liberal- and Nationalist-led resistance. Hoederer intends to organize a joint resistance group opposing the Germans, and plan for a post-war coalition government. Hugo feels that Hoederer's policy is treacherous. Louis, another party leader, has decided that Hoederer must die. He grudgingly agrees to let Hugo, who has more commitment than experience, carry out the assassination of Hoederer.

Hugo and his wife Jessica move in with Hoederer, who is charming and trusting by nature. Hugo then becomes his secretary. Although Hugo tries to convince Jessica that he is in earnest about the murder, she treats the whole thing as a game. Indeed, at first she sees the gun not as a murder weapon but as a metaphor for a phallus, hinting that Hugo may suffer from erectile dysfunction and is unable to please her. Ten days pass and the negotiations begin with the other parties. When Hoederer almost reaches a deal with the members of the class that he loathes, Hugo is on the point of reaching for his gun until a bomb explodes.

No one is killed, but Hugo is furious, believing that the bomb attack suggests that those who sent him do not trust him to assassinate Hoederer. He gets drunk and almost gives the game up to Hoederer's bodyguards. Jessica covers up for him by claiming to be pregnant. (Here Sartre cites the behavior of Lucie Aubrac, a heroine in the French resistance who helped her husband, Raymond Aubrac, another leading resistant, escape from the control of Nazis by claiming that she was pregnant.)

Olga Lorame, one of those who sent Hugo to commit the murder, discreetly visits Hugo and Jessica. A conversation between Olga and Jessica reveals that Olga threw the bomb as a warning for Hugo. Olga warns Hugo that his current pace is too slow, and that unless he assassinates Hoederer soon, she'll replace him with someone else.

The bomb convinces Jessica, who, up to this point, viewed the mission as a game, that Hugo's task to assassinate Hoederer is serious.

Hoederer's plan is to enter government with the other parties but to leave them with the key ministerial posts. Once the war is over a number of unpopular but necessary policies will have to be implemented in order to rebalance the economy. These policies will cause problems for the right-wing government, allowing the left-wing groups, including the Communists, to seize power more easily. Currently, the Communists do not have enough support to gain power, and the expected arrival of the Soviet forces may exacerbate the situation. Hoederer points out that people do not like occupying foreign armies, even liberating ones, and the feeling will be passed on to the government introduced by the invaders.

Hugo insists that the party must remain pure. He maintains that they, the Communists, must seize power, but Hoederer's expedient methods are not acceptable, especially since they involve collaborating with "class" enemies and deceiving their own forces. Once Hugo and Jessica are alone, Jessica tries to convince Hugo that he was persuaded by Hoederer's view. Hugo, however, is convinced that his agreement with Hoederer's vision is all the more the reason to kill Hoederer because Hugo could convince others.

Over time, however, both Hugo and Jessica succumb to Hoederer's charm and manner. Although he disagrees with Hoederer's policies, Hugo believes that Hoederer could help him cross from boyhood to manhood and resolve his internal conflicts. Hoederer, who is now aware that Hugo is there to kill him on Louis' orders, is willing to help Hugo solve his problems. He is not, however, so keen on Jessica, whose attraction to him seems more physical. When he kisses her to relieve her attraction, Hugo sees their intimate moment and kills Hoederer.

While in prison Hugo receives gifts, which he guesses are from those who sent him to kill Hoederer. These gifts motivate Hugo, but he finds that some of the gifts are poisoned chocolates. When Hugo is released on parole, he finds himself stalked by the party's enemies and takes refuge with Olga.

Olga listens to Hugo's account of the murder and the events surrounding it. Hugo did not kill Hoederer out of jealousy for Jessica but because he thought that Hoederer was not sincere when he said that he wanted Hugo to stay with him in order to mentor him: "I killed him because I opened the door. That's all I know", "Jealous? Perhaps. But not for Jessica."

Olga concludes that Hugo will be more useful alive than dead. However she also reveals that the policy that Hoederer proposed has been adopted after all. On Moscow's orders, the party has formed an alliance with the other groups. In fact, Hugo realizes that the plan Hoederer was negotiating earlier, and which he was supposed to prevent, has been carried out. Hoederer's initiative was too premature, though, so the party had to kill him. After Hoederer's plan was adopted, the party rehabilitated his reputation, intending to commemorate him as a great leader and hero.

Hugo is angered, especially since the party has deceived its own members. In Hugo's view, the fact that they are at war and have likely saved a hundred thousand lives makes no difference. What matters now, he decides, is that Hoederer should die not for a woman like Jessica, but rather for his policies—lying to the rank and file and jeopardizing the soul of the party.

Hugo realizes that, despite Olga's statements to the contrary, if he continues to live and remain a member of the party, his assassination of Hoederer will be meaningless. Olga tries desperately to convince him to live, but Hugo is intent on dying. When the hitmen knock on the door, Hugo announces that he has not killed Hoederer yet, but he will kill him and then himself. Hugo then kicks open the door.

== Characters ==
Hoederer, a former member of the Illyrian parliament and a leading figure in the Socialist Proletarian Party. He has a very trusting nature and even remains friendly with Hugo after he realizes the young man is there to kill him. He offers to help Hugo sort out his internal conflicts. His plans are based on the political reality of the situation.

Hugo Barine, a young 23-year-old bourgeois intellectual who joined the party's Communist faction under the name of Raskolnikov (from Dostoevsky's Crime and Punishment). His father is a leading businessman and, since he comes from a wealthy background, most members of the party dismiss him as an intellectual who does not even know what poverty is really like. Hugo is anxious to prove his worth to them, especially Louis and Olga, and he sees killing Hoederer as a way to achieve this.

Jessica, Hugo's 19-year-old wife. She keeps out of politics, referring to herself as someone brought up to simply "put flowers in vases". At first, she treats the approaching murder as a game, which does not help Hugo's confidence, but then she tries desperately to prevent it. When Hugo is jailed she at first keeps in touch but then breaks off communication and stops using her married name.

Louis, another leading figure in the Proletarian Party, but opposed to Hoederer's plan.

Olga, a member of Louis' faction and one of the few friends Hugo has.

Karsky, the leader of the Pentagon, a group that includes Liberals and Nationalists, fighting the Regent of Illyria and his pro-Fascist government.

The Prince, the son of the Regent and his representative in the negotiations.

Slick, Georges and Leon, Hoederer's bodyguards.

Charles and Frantz, Communist assassins sent to kill Hugo after his release from prison.

Ivan, a saboteur for the Communists.

== Historical context ==
World War II has a lot to do with this play and how it was written. Illyria (also the location of Shakespeare's Twelfth Night) was presumably based upon Hungary. The 'Parti Proletarian' is the communist party to which most of the main characters in the story belong. They are fighting for "une société sans classes" ("a classless society"). The other two parties mentioned in this play are the Regent's Fascist government which supports Germany and the 'Pentagone' which is made up of the middle classes.

Hungary at that time was ruled by a Regent, Miklós Horthy, who appointed Prime Minister Gyula Gömbös in 1932. Gömbös wanted to co-operate with Nazi Germany, and, although this ended Hungary's depression, it made it economically dependent on Germany. The Hungarian government supported the policies and goals of Nazi Germany.

In 1938, the new Prime Minister, Kálmán Darányi, decided to make his new policies very pro-Germany and pro-Italy, a bit like how Hoederer wanted to join with the other parties to try to evolve as a country and stay on everyone's good side to get his own party's point across.

== Legacy ==
Les mains sales is primarily based on the theme of existentialism which Sartre espoused, but many have taken it as a straightforward political drama. Right-wingers welcomed it as anti-communist, and left-wingers attacked it for the same reason. When Dirty Hands was released in France in 1951 Communists threatened the cinemas showing it. In fact the play itself was not re-staged in France until 1976.

The play was not staged in a socialist state until November 1968 when it was shown in Prague after the invasion of Czechoslovakia by fellow Warsaw Pact forces.

Underlying the critics' response to Les mains sales is the extent to which it is a play too rooted in themes of politics and existentialism, and whether, as a consequence, it becomes inaccessible for the average spectator.

Non-French versions of the play have had other titles, including Dirty Hands, The Assassin, Red Gloves and Crime Passionnel.

In 1982, the play was performed at the Greenwich Theatre in London under the title of The Assassin, starring Edward Woodward and Michele Dotrice. It was performed again later in 2000 in Britain under the title of The Novice, starring Jamie Glover as Hugo and Kenneth Cranham as Hoederer. The director of this performance, Richard Eyre, intended to raise conflicting differences in contemporary British political life, such as the Northern Ireland peace process or the Old and New factions of Britain's Labour Party government. In 2017, the play was adapted by Leopold Benedict for the Pembroke Players, under the title of Dirty Hands: A Brexistential Crisis, to comment on the politics of the post-Brexit era.
