= Tapio Ilomäki =

Finnish composer (1904–1955)

Juho Tapio Ilomäki (21 April 1904 − 25 July 1955) was a Finnish film composer. During his 25-year career, he composed music for several Finnish film production companies. Occasionally Ilomäki used a pseudonym Jussi Mäki.

== Selected filmography ==
- Laveata tietä (1931)
- False Greta (1934)
- Synnitön lankeemus (1943)
- Sellaisena kuin sinä minut halusit (1944)
- Noita palaa elämään (1952)
- Putkinotko (1954)
