= Roland af Hällström =

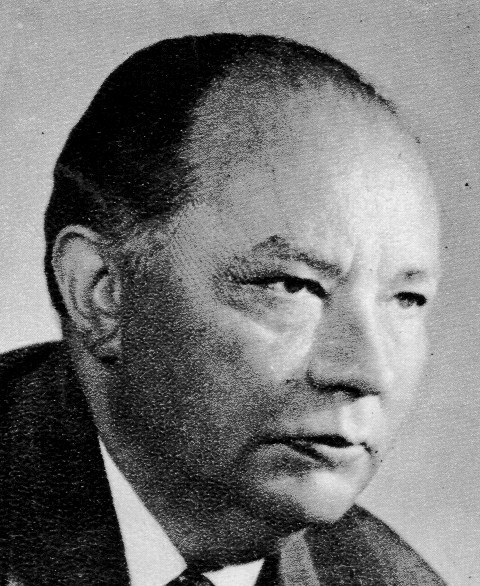

Gustaf Gabriel Roland af Hällström (23 August 1905 – 21 February 1956) was a Finnish film director. During his career, he directed 20 films, including Pikajuna pohjoiseen (1947), Läpi usvan (1948), Tukkijoella (1951), Noita palaa elämään (1952), Putkinotko (1954) and Ryysyrannan Jooseppi (1955).

Hällström was married to actress Elvi Saarnio. As a screenwriter, he used a pseudonym Viljo Hela.

== Selected filmography ==
- Houkutuslintu (1946)
- North Express (1947)
- Hornankoski (1949)
- Hallin Janne (1950)
- Noita palaa elämään (1952)
- Island Girl (1953)
- The Millionaire Recruit (1953)
- Shamrock (1953)
- Kuningas kulkureitten (1953)
- Poika eli kesäänsä (1955)
- Lain mukaan (1956)
