= Jukka Sipilä =

- Born: 12 May 1936; Kivijärvi, Finland
- Died: 7 August 2004 (aged 68); Helsinki, Finland

Jukka Sipilä (12 May 1936, Kivijärvi – 7 August 2004, Helsinki, Finland) was a prolific Finnish actor and television director.

He began acting in film in the 1960s and took up TV directing shortly in the early 1970s before concentrating on acting again. He appeared in films such as the 1983 James Bond spoof Agent 000 and the Deadly Curves opposite actors Ilmari Saarelainen and Tenho Sauren. He retired in 2003 shortly before his death.

== Selected filmography ==
- Mona Lisan hymy, 1966
- Käpy selän alla, 1966
- Lapualaismorsian, 1967
- Täällä Pohjantähden alla, 1968
- Leikkikalugangsteri, 1969
- Sixtynine 69, 1969
- Naisenkuvia, 1970
- Lampaansyöjät, 1972
- Hellyys, 1972
- Pohjantähti, 1973
- Mies. joka ei osannut sanoa ei, 1975
- Ihmemies, 1979
- Kiljusten herrasväki, 1981
- Hukkaputki TV-comedy show (1981–1983)
- Agentti 000 ja kuoleman kurvit, 1983
- Uuno Turhapuro muuttaa maalle, 1986
- Vääpeli Körmy ja vetenalaiset vehkeet, 1991
- Lipton Cockton in the Shadows of Sodoma, 1995
- Pahat pojat, 2002
