= Matti Ruohola =

Finnish actor and comedian (1940–2014)

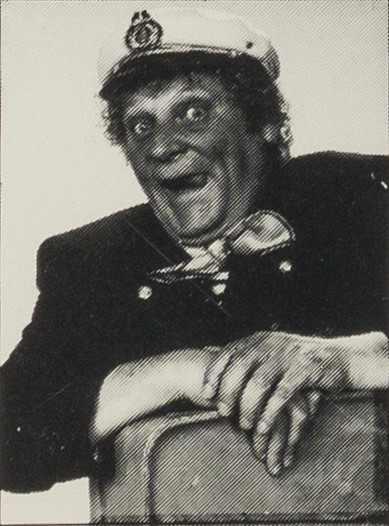
- Matti Ruohola in the role of Matti Merimies (Matti the Sailor).
- Born: Matti Santeri Ruohola; 12 June 1940; Heinola, Finland
- Died: 16 February 2014 (aged 73)
- Occupations: Actor; comedian

Matti Santeri Ruohola (12 June 1940 – 16 February 2014) was a Finnish actor and comedian.

== Biography ==
Ruohola began acting as early as 1965 and has made several appearances in mostly film, but also in Finnish television and comedy. He has appeared in films such as the 1983 James Bond spoof Agent 000 and the Deadly Curves opposite actors Ilmari Saarelainen and Tenho Saurén but more recently since 1990 has provided the Finnish voices of Moominpappa and Stinky for the Finnish-Japanese series Moomin.

== Selected filmography ==
- The Diary of a Worker (1967)
- Antti the Treebranch (1976)
- Hunters of the Night (1984)
