= Wonderman (film) =

1979 Finnish science fiction film by Antti Peippo

- Original Finnish film poster
- Finnish: Ihmemies
- Directed by: Antti Peippo
- Written by: Jussi Kylätasku; Antti Peippo
- Produced by: Kullervo Kukkasjärvi
- Starring: Antti Litja; Martti Pennanen; Saara Pakkasvirta
- Cinematography: Juha-Veli Äkräs
- Edited by: Juho Gartz
- Music by: Antti Hytti; Esa Helasvuo
- Production company: Filminor Oy
- Distributed by: Suomi-Filmi Oy
- Release date: 2 November 1979
- Running time: 103 minutes
- Country: Finland
- Language: Finnish
- Budget: FIM 2.1 million

Wonderman (Finnish: Ihmemies) is a 1979 Finnish science fiction horror comedy film directed by Antti Peippo and starring Antti Litja, Martti Pennanen and Saara Pakkasvirta. It tells story about the data-expert that proposes, after his brain capacity has been developed in the special rationalization program, the serious measures that will save the company from an economic collapse, but when his drastic savings programs forces the board to resign, he must go underground.

The film is the only directorial work of Peippo, who was better known as a cinematographer, and Jouko Turkka was originally planned to be the director of the film. Wonderman was also the first film production of the Filminor company after the death of its leader Risto Jarva in 1977. The Finnish Film Foundation supported the production of Wonderman with FIM 830,000. Yleisradio bought three TV broadcast rights in advance for FIM 220,000, but only used two of them. The official premiere of the film was on 2 November 1979, only in Finland's largest cities; in Kuopio, Pori, Vaasa and Jyväskylä, Wonderman was not seen until around 1980. Viewers, the film gathered 42% of the 1979 average.

According to the advertising slogan on the poster, Wonderman was a "comedy for our time" (Komedia meidän ajastamme), but after the film's premiere, critics didn't really know how to feel about it, as its slapstick-style visual comedy was considered too overlaid on the story. Mikael Fränti from Helsingin Sanomat mentioned the following about the film, among other things: "What kind of movie is Wonderman? Maybe we could talk about a contemplative film that also relies on humor and functional pranks. --- But apparently the problem is that Wonderman is too 'literary' at the level of the script. And during the making process, this written taste has not been completely achieved to eliminate." A later reviewer, Pekka Suorsa from DVD-opas, sees the Wonderman as telling more about our own time squeezed by the "quarter economy" than about the problems of the late 1970s.

== Plot ==
Olli Ruusunen (Antti Litja) is a child prodigy who, as the only Finn and the best in his class, has received special training at the Buffalo Institute in the United States. His brain capacity has been developed to the utmost by training the right hemisphere of the brain in tormenting, which many have not endured. The training was paid for by director Tuomola's (Martti Pennanen) company, for which Olli has planned a rationalization program after returning to Finland. Olli presents his plan to the company's management team: the restructuring requires the dismissal of a third of the employees but also the entire management. Tuomola tells Olli to stop his work, but Paavola (Ville Salminen), the bank manager who controls the company's finances, is enthusiastic about Olli's program and supports him.

At the company party, Olli causes aggravation and they try to keep him out of Paavola's way. However, the men meet again each other. In the following days, Olli begins to behave in a completely new, liberated way: he escapes from Tuomola's hands and also rejects the attempts of his colleague Ronkainen (Paavo Piskonen) and the ambitious secretary, economist Tuula Korkeamäki (Tarja-Tuulikki Tarsala), to get him to return to work. Instead, he meets Anneli (Saara Pakkasvirta), an uncomplicated woman who works as a bartender, in a middle-class beer bar and starts living with her. One day, Olli finds a landlord in Anneli's apartment (Markku Blomqvist), who for half a year has been waiting in vain for the rent payment "in nature".

Olli and Anneli plan to run away together, but while applying for a final account from the company, Olli is arrested and sent to treatment; Anneli waits for him in vain. Paavola and Korkeamäki plot together against Tuomola and the man is transferred to early retirement after 30 years of service. Olli runs away from the hospital, buys himself a pair of clothes from a department store, refusing to pay for them; he also refuses to pay in the tram, throws the driver out and starts driving the trolley at high speed on his own. While staying at home, Olli learns that the psychiatrist Veijalainen (Jukka Sipilä) who treated him is now mentally ill himself and that his classmates from Buffalo have also lost their minds.

Olli returns to the management of the company and celebrates in a restaurant with his wife (Maija Karhi), Paavola and Korkeamäki. At the bar, he meets Anneli, who first teases the man and then goes on another runaway trip with him. At the railway station, they meet Tuomola, who says that he is traveling to the forest and begins to give a working-class monologue about freedom and the possibilities of people's power to passers-by at the station square. In the station tunnel, they follow the antics of the youth: one boy kicks the other's bum, and Anneli says that it is her own son, whom she was not allowed to raise.

In the morning, Olli and Anneli hitchhike along the country roads and get a ride to Kotka. They go to the ship, where Anneli meets her old friends and colleagues. However, Olli immediately begins to rationalize and manage the sailors' work. There is no togetherness, Olli returns to land and gets into the black car waiting at the pier.

== Cast ==
- Antti Litja as Olli Ruusunen
- Martti Pennanen as Martti Tuomola
- Saara Pakkasvirta as Anneli
- Tarja-Tuulikki Tarsala as Tuula Korkeamäki
- Maija Karhi as Helena Ruusunen
- Jukka Sipilä as psychiatrist Veijalainen
- Paavo Piskonen as Ronkainen
- Markku Blomqvist as Anneli's landlord
- Tuomas Peippo as Janne Ruusunen
- Ville Salminen as bank manager Paavola
