= Ritva Vepsä =

Finnish actress (1941–2016)

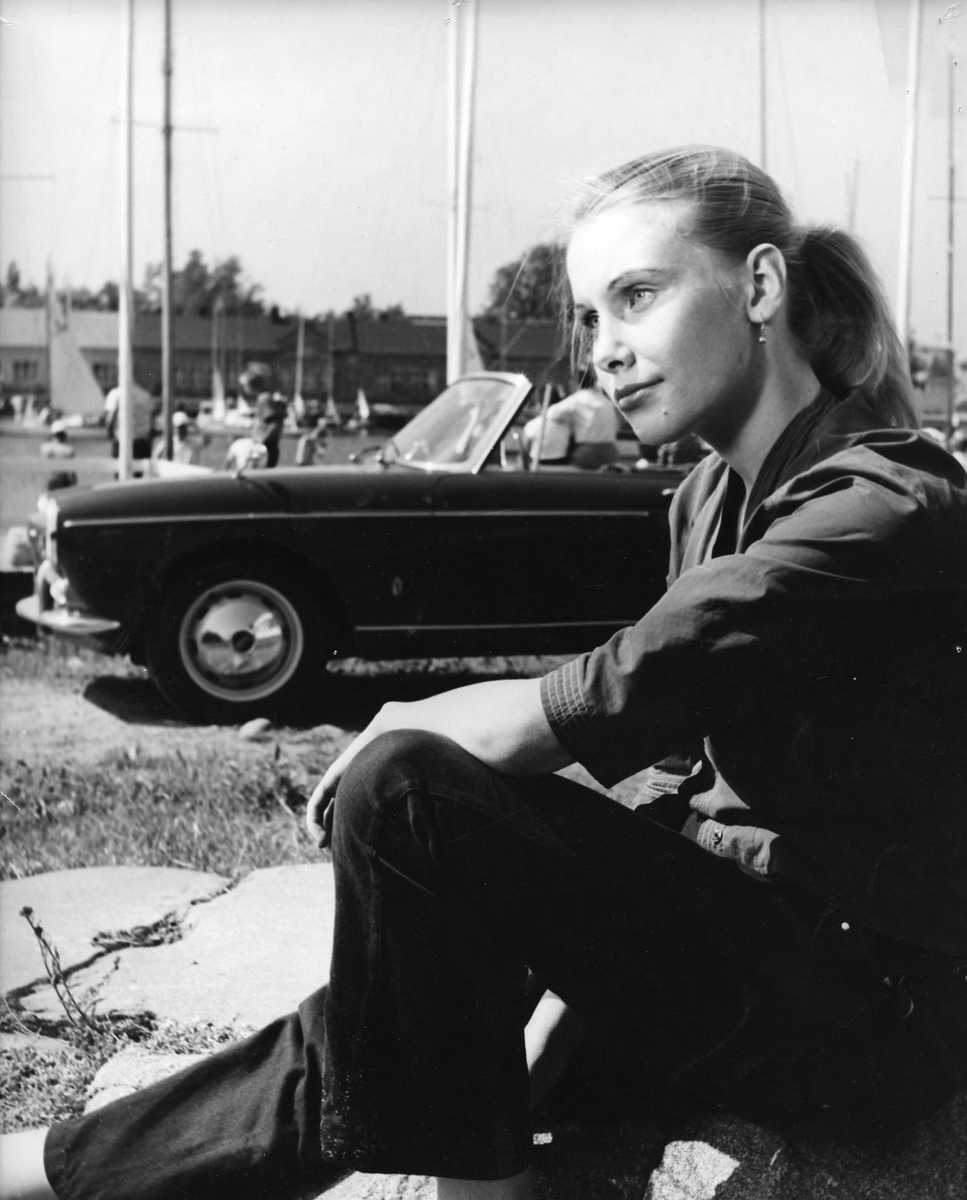

Ritva Annikki Vepsä (12 February 1941, Helsinki – 30 July 2016) was a Finnish actress. In 1970 she received a Jussi Award as the Best Leading Actress for her appearances in a Jörn Donner film Sixtynine 69 and a Risto Jarva film Ruusujen aika. Vepsä was married to actor and director Yrjö Tähtelä 1960–79. Vepsä died on 30 July 2016, aged 75, at her home from lung cancer.

== Selected filmography ==
- Nuori mylläri (1958)
- Totuus on armoton (1963)
- Onnelliset leikit (1964)
- Time of Roses (1969)
- Sixtynine 69 (1969)
- Naisenkuvia (1970)
- Loma (1976)
- Koeputkiaikuinen ja Simon enkelit (1979)
- Pedon merkki (1981)
- Rampe & Naukkis – kaikkien aikojen superpari (1990)
