= Titta Jokinen =

Finnish actress (born 1951)

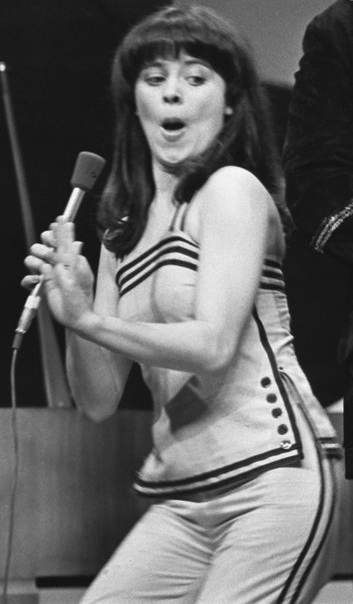
- Titta Jokinen in 1976.
- Born: 23 February 1951 (age 74); Kalanti, Finland

Titta Jokinen (born 23 February 1951 in Kalanti, Finland) is a Finnish actress.

== Career ==
Jokinen has appeared in both Finnish film and television since 1973. She appeared in the 1983 James Bond spoof Agent 000 and the Deadly Curves opposite actors Ilmari Saarelainen and Tenho Sauren but since the 1980s has mainly appeared on TV.

== Personal life ==
Jokinen's daughter Kiti Kokkonen is an actress and writer.
