= Seppo Kolehmainen =

Finnish actor

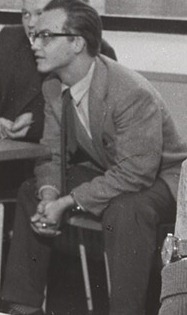
- Born: 18 January 1933; Pielavesi, Finland
- Died: 23 February 2009 (aged 76); Helsinki, Finland

Seppo Kolehmainen (18 January 1933 – 23 February 2009) was a Finnish film actor.

== Biography ==
Kolehmainen was born in Pielavesi, Finland. He appeared in Finnish films since late 1955. He appeared in the 1983 James Bond spoof Agent 000 and the Deadly Curves alongside actors Ilmari Saarelainen and Tenho Saurén. More recently, he appeared on Finnish television in two episodes of Salatut elämät in January 2006. He died in Helsinki on 23 February 2009, aged 76.

== Sources and external links ==
- Seppo Kolehmainen at IMDb
