= Lampaansyöjät (film) =

1972 Finnish film directed by Seppo Huunonen

- Original Finnish poster
- Directed by: Seppo Huunonen
- Written by: Seppo Huunonen; Pekka Hakala
- Based on: Lampaansyöjät by Veikko Huovinen
- Produced by: Seppo Huunonen
- Starring: Heikki Kinnunen; Leo Lastumäki
- Cinematography: Kari Sohlberg; Esko Jantunen; Risto Inkinen; Pentti Auer
- Edited by: Erkki Seiro
- Music by: Paroni Paakkunainen; Tapio Rautavaara; Ilpo Saastamoinen
- Production company: Filmi-Ässä Oy
- Distributed by: Finnkino Oy
- Release date: 17 November 1972
- Running time: 96 minutes
- Country: Finland
- Language: Finnish
- Budget: FIM 850,075

Lampaansyöjät (The Sheep Eaters) is a 1972 Finnish comedy-drama film written, produced and directed by Seppo Huunonen. Based on the 1970 novel The Sheep Eaters by Veikko Huovinen, it tells the story of two men who decide to execute "Operation Sheep Eaters" they had planned during the winter, with the intention of spending their summer vacation in the countryside, hunting sheep and roasting them for "robber's roast". The film both parodies and admires the traditional Finnish man's longing for freedom from the dreary everyday life. The film stars Heikki Kinnunen and Leo Lastumäki.

Huunonen won the Jussi Award for Best Producer for the film. Like the original novel, the film adaptation increased the recognition of the "robber's roast" recipe.

== Plot ==
Forester Sepe (Heikki Kinnunen) and branch manager Valtteri (Leo Lastumäki) meet at the beginning of their summer vacation at the beach hotel in Kalajoki and launch the "Operation Sheep Eaters" they planned for the winter. They eat well and continue to celebrate with a bottle of cognac in the hotel room.

In the morning, they drive north through Oulu and spend the night in a travel home. They wake up at four in the morning by an innkeeper and prepare to execute their plans as the sun rises. Sepe changes the car's license plates, they find grazing sheep and Valtteri poaches one of them by shooting. They drain the blood from the animal, chop the legs by axe with them and leave the rest of the sheep for the owner by the fence. When they go shopping, they send the host a postal address for 150 marks, which Sepe has filled out with the office machine shop's typewriter to cover their tracks. Sepe and Valtteri drive a motorboat to an island on the lake and camp. While the mutton is cooking in the cauldron, they talk about politics and drink booze. After eating, Valtteri is so drunk that he falls into the lake and refuses to come to the tent to dry off. In the morning, they cure their hangovers with new brews and prepare braised lamb.

Before long, the comrades get tired of their island life and go to the "paint village", where they go to the movies and the arcades. After spending time at the hotel in Suomutunturi, they are ready for another attack and Valtteri shoots his second sheep. This time they take the whole sheep to prepare an "Outer Mongolian robber's roast": they remove the entrails, fill the cavity with rice, potatoes, onions and spices and let the sheep cook in a clay crust in a stone-lined, heated pit, on top of which they build a campfire. While waiting for the roast, Sepe and Valtteri drink booze and develop their thoughts to praise the beauty of "pussy". The lamb turns out to be delicious, but they get tired of that too and start fantasize for the trout and fresh water of Lapland's mountain streams. A group of scantily clad German women canoeing has camped on the opposite shore. Two of them come to Sepe and Valtteri's camp and want to buy food: when the men offer their "robber's roast", the women back away in horror when they see the butchered sheep remains. Men turn it around so that Providence saved them from the clutches of "bad women".

Sepe and Valtteri's journey continues further north from here. They stop by the liquor store, check their trash can left over from the previous summer at their familiar gravel pit, and continue their philosophical discussions. They decide to visit Norway to see the Arctic Ocean. On the way back, the men run over a sheep: they are afraid of the consequences of their action, knowing that Norway is part of NATO and the risk of being caught at customs is too high, so they throw the dead animal into the river. In the end, the men get drunk in the gravel pit where they've set up their tent and feel that life is back to normal.

== Cast ==
- Heikki Kinnunen as Sepe
- Leo Lastumäki as Valtteri
- Jukka Sipilä as a farmer
- Pentti Auer as #1 drunk rower
- Jaakko Talaskivi as #2 drunk rower
- Elina Hoffrén as a cook of Suomu restaurant
- Rose-Marie Precht as a butler of Suomu restaurant
- Nadja Saario as a waitress at the beach hotel
- Raili Veivo as an innkeeper
- Tuula Lindfors as #1 German woman
- Anita Sohlberg as #2 German woman
- Väinö Kolhonen as a news photographer

Director Huunonen makes a cameo role in the film only showing his hands washing the pot.

== Production ==
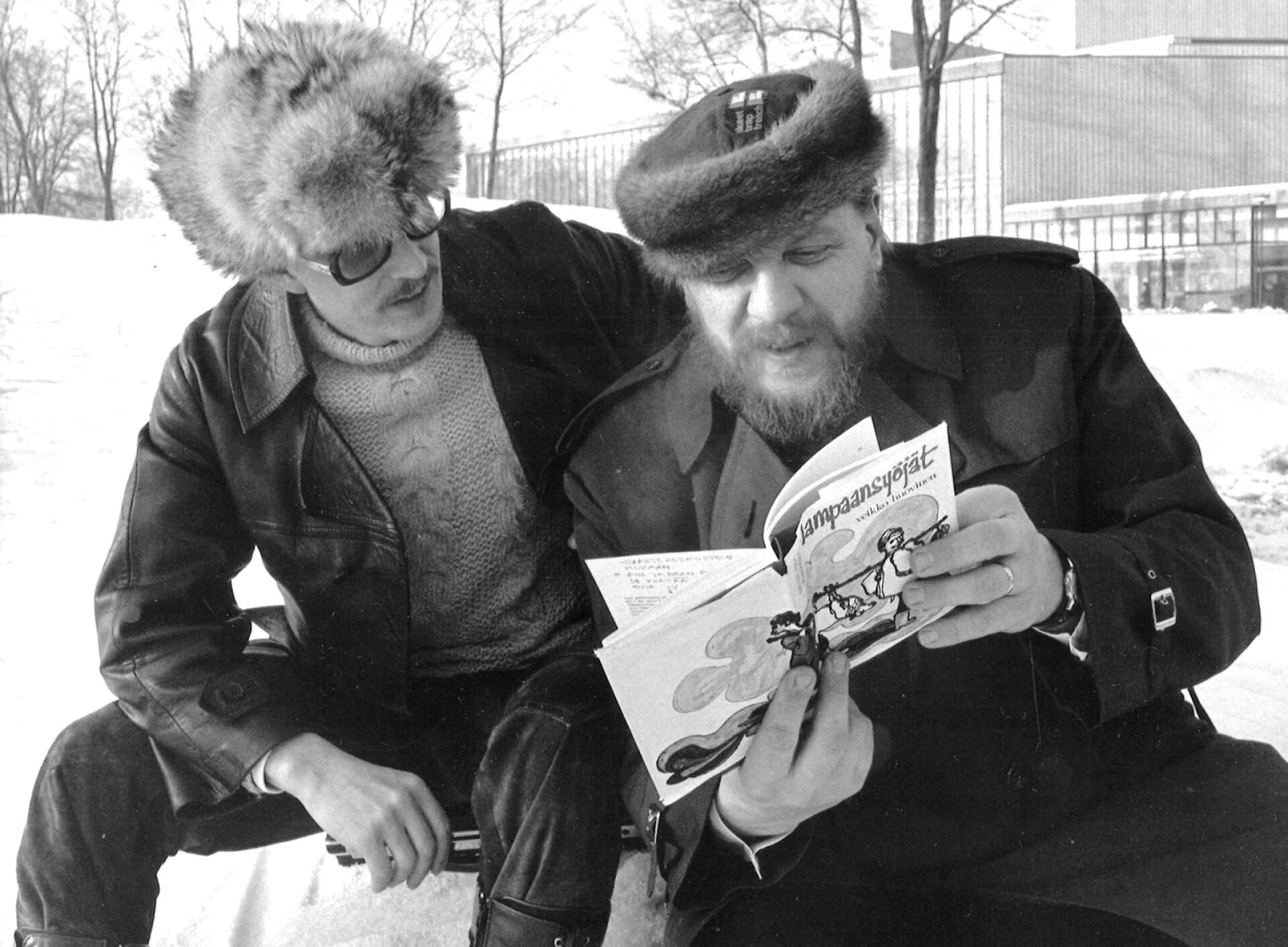
From left to right: director Seppo Huunonen and actor Leo Lastumäki reading Lampaansyöjät novel in February 1972

When Huovinen's picaresque novel was published in 1970, filmmaker Spede Pasanen showed interest in making a film adaptation based on the book, before the film rights were granted to Seppo Huunonen, who at that time only worked as a producer of commercials and short films. Lampaansyöjät was his first feature film as both producer and director. The film received a production loan of FIM 70,000 from the Finnish Film Foundation. Actors Heikki Kinnunen and Leo Lastumäki, who had previously acted together in the 1971–72 television sketch show Ällitälli, were chosen for the roles of the film's main characters, Sepe and Valtteri.

The film was shot between March and September in 1972. Filming locations have been located in different parts of Finland, including in Kalajoki, and also in Tromsø, Norway. During the making of the film, cinematographers had to be changed; when the original cinematographer Kari Sohlberg moved to the production of Rauni Mollberg's 1973 film The Earth Is a Sinful Song. When Heikki Katajisto, who was appointed as his replacement, got into a traffic accident, it was decided that Risto Inkinen, Esko Jantunen and Pentti Auer would complete the shooting of the film.

The film features an original soundtrack written for the film by Paroni Paakkunainen and Vexi Salmi, performed by singer Tapio Rautavaara in addition to Kinnunen and Lastumäki.

== Release ==
The film was premiered on November 17, 1972. The film gathered a total of 341,101 viewers, which was more than all other Finnish films of the same year combined. In Finland, it was the third most watched film after The Godfather and A Clockwork Orange. The film was shown on Finnish television for the first time on April 5, 1975. During that time, the Ice Hockey World Championships match between Finland and the Soviet Union was broadcast on another channel. Despite this, the film gathered 1,147,000 viewers.

The film received mixed reviews from critics. For example, in the premiere review, Eeva Järvenpää from Helsingin Sanomat said that she considers Kari Sohlberg's cinematography to be the best part of the film, which shows the landscapes of Northern Finland as "beautiful as a travel film", and she also praised the chemistry of Kinnusen and Lastumäki, a well-honed comedy couple on television, and said it was at its best when Huovinen's literary style and "teen convention-like" dialogue had been modified to suit the actors' mouths. However, she criticized the film's social message, or rather the lack of it: "Lampaansyöjät is made for those people who don't worry unnecessarily, who have their own mouth first and money for their own needs. It's only good to hope that Finns will sometimes be surprised by other, perhaps more important films."

According to Kinnunen, Huovinen himself was dissatisfied with the adaptation.

== See also ==
- List of Finnish films of the 1970s
- The Hair (film)
