= That Kiljunen Family =

- Original Finnish film poster
- Finnish: Kiljusen herrasväki
- Directed by: Matti Kuortti
- Written by: Kullervo Kukkasjärvi; Matti Kuortti; Lasse Naukkarinen
- Based on: Kiljusen herrasväki by Jalmari Finne
- Produced by: Kullervo Kukkasjärvi
- Starring: Jukka Sipilä; Marja-Sisko Aimonen; Jouni Lukus; Kai Lemmetty; Salli Pallasmaa
- Cinematography: Erkki Peltomaa
- Edited by: Juho Gartz
- Music by: Markku Kopisto
- Production company: Filminor Oy
- Distributed by: Suomi-Filmi Oy
- Release date: 20 November 1981
- Running time: 103 minutes
- Country: Finland
- Language: Finnish
- Budget: FIM 2.7 million

That Kiljunen Family (Finnish: Kiljusen herrasväki) is a 1981 Finnish musical comedy family film directed by Matti Kuortti and starring Jukka Sipilä and Marja-Sisko Aimonen. It is based on the 1914 children's book of the same name by Jalmari Finne.

At the beginning of the 1970s, the production company Filminor had already planned a family film based on Finne's children's book, but at that time the project fell through because the topic was reserved for Yleisradio. After Risto Jarva's death in 1977, Filminor gave the directing opportunity to Antti Peippo and Timo Linnasalo, whose films had a rather weak public success, and the subject of Finne was taken up again: Matti Kuortti, a long-time Filminor native since the late 1960s as a sound engineer and editor in the company, directed That Kiljunen Family as his debut film.

The film was a commercial hit when it came out in theaters, and it gathered more than 200,000 viewers, which was the second most viewed in 1981 after Uuno Turhapuron aviokriisi. Due to the film's success, it received a sequel, The New Adventures of That Kiljunen Family, in 1990, which was also directed by Matti Kuortti.

== Plot ==
The film is about the Kiljunen family (originally Kiljander) living in the country, who are known for their inventions and their loud voice, which the family name refers to (Finnish word kiljua literally means "screaming" or "yelling"). One sunny day, the Kiljunen family receives a letter in which they read that they have won a prize trip to Helsinki in a quiz. When the family then arrives in the capital of Finland, which is not already prepared for the arrival of such a loud and distinctive family, nothing is the same anymore.

== Cast ==
- Jukka Sipilä as Mr. Kiljunen, the father of family
- Marja-Sisko Aimonen as Mrs. Kiljunen, the mother of family
- Jouni Lukus as Mikael "Mökö" Kiljunen, the first son of family
- Kai Lemmetty as Lennart "Luru" Kiljunen, the second son of family
- Salli Pallasmaa as Olga Vilhelmiina "Plättä" Kiljunen, the daughter of family
- Tuija Ahvonen as Liisa Lehto, the journalist
- Paavo Piskonen as Reiska, the photographer
- Markku Blomqvist as Mr. Puputti, the editor-in-chief
- Antti Litja as the Mayor of Helsinki
- Esa Pakarinen Jr. as Jalmari Finne, the author of Kiljusen herrasväki books
