= Rita Polster =

Finnish film actress (born 1948)

- Born: 2 February 1948 (age 78); Turku, Finland

Rita Polster (born 2 February 1948, in Turku, Finland) is a Finnish film actress.

Polster began acting in Finnish film in 1976 and has made a number of appearances in Finnish film throughout the late 1970s and 1980s, appearing in many films such as the 1983 James Bond spoof Agent 000 and the Deadly Curves where she acted alongside actors such as Ilmari Saarelainen and Tenho Sauren. However, after 1990 she has appeared only on television in Finland and has not appeared on camera since 1995.

Rita Polster also became known in the Soviet Union, thanks to the film "Borrowing Matchsticks" the Soviet-Finnish production.
