= Solar wind (disambiguation) =

Solar wind is a stellar phenomenon of the Sun

Solar wind may also refer to:

- Stellar wind, gas ejected from the atmosphere of stars
- Solar Winds, a computer game
- SolarWinds, a network management software company
- Solar Winds hack, a nickname for the 2020 United States federal government data breach, in which the network management company was a target
- Solar Wind (comic), a British comic
- Hearing Solar Winds, an album of composer David Hykes
- "Solar Wind", a song by Snowkel which is also the second ending theme for Japanese anime series Kiba
- Solar Wind (album), a 1974 album by pianist Ramsey Lewis
- The Solar Wind (Aurinkotuuli), a 1975 Finnish novel by Kullervo Kukkasjärvi
  - The Solar Wind (film), a 1980 film directed by Timo Linnasalo, based on the novel

== See also ==
- Stellar wind (disambiguation)
