= Pekka Elomaa =

Pekka Johannes Elomaa
- Born: 24 May 1948; Ahlainen, Finland
- Died: 27 April 1995 (aged 46)

Pekka Elomaa (1948–1995) is a Finnish film actor best known for his roles in the 1983 James Bond spoof Agent 000 and the Deadly Curves opposite actors Ilmari Saarelainen and Tenho Sauren. He also appeared in the 1992 film Pirtua, pirtua, and the 1982 film Likainen puolitusina. All three films were directed by Visa Mäkinen.
