= The Solar Wind =

Science fiction novel by Kullervo Kukkasjärvi

- Cover of the first Finnish edition.
- Author: Kullervo Kukkasjärvi
- Original title: Finnish: Aurinkotuuli
- Language: Finnish
- Genre: Science fiction
- Publisher: WSOY
- Publication date: 1975
- Publication place: Finland
- Media type: Print (Hardback)
- Pages: 221
- ISBN: 951-0-07237-0

The Solar Wind (Finnish: Aurinkotuuli) is a 1975 Finnish science fiction novel by Kullervo Kukkasjärvi (1938–1983). It tells the story of a gravity scientist who died in 1970 and is awakened from cryosleep in 1999, when the world has gone through an ecological disaster. The work deals with human adaptation to nature's narrative.

== Background ==
The Solar Wind was the only novel written by Kukkasjärvi, who was mainly known as a film producer and screenwriter. Participating in the filming production of 1969 sci-fi film Time of Roses, directed by Risto Jarva, ignited a spark in Kukkasjärvi's science fiction hobby, which also inspired him to write a novel.

== Film adaptation ==
In 1980, a film adaptation based on the novel was released, directed by Timo Linnasalo and starring by Paavo Piskonen, Lilga Kovanko and Antti Litja. Kukkasjärvi also participated in the making of the film as a producer. When it was released, the film was not a particular success with audiences, and although critics praised the film's ambition and intellectual themes, it was criticized for being too graveness and the plot moving too slowly.
