= Elomaa =

Elomaa is a Finnish surname. Notable people with the surname include:

- Heikki Elomaa (born 1986), Finnish sailor
- Kike Elomaa (born 1955), Finnish female bodybuilder, politician, and singer
- Pekka Elomaa (1948–1995), Finnish actor
