= Hunters of the Night =

Hunters of the Night may refer to:

- Hunters of the Night (song), a 1984 single by Mr. Mister
- Hunters of the Night (film), a 1984 Finnish action thriller film
