= Visa Mäkinen =

Finnish actor and filmmaker

- Born: 28 March 1945 (age 80); Pori, Finland

Visa Mäkinen (born 28 March 1945 in Pori, Finland) is a Finnish film director, film producer, actor and screen writer.

== Career ==
He has directed and produced films such as the 1983 James Bond spoof Agent 000 and the Deadly Curves which featured actors Ilmari Saarelainen and Tenho Sauren.

He has also acted and written for several films.

== Filmography ==
=== Feature films ===
- Voi juku, mikä lauantai (1979)
- Mitäs me sankarit (1980)
- Kaikenlaisia karkureita (1981)
- Pi, pi, pil... pilleri (1982)
- Likainen puolitusina (1982)
- Agentti 000 ja kuoleman kurvit (1983)
- Vapaa duunari Ville-Kalle (1984)
- Yön saalistajat (1984)
- Pekka & Pätkä ja tuplajättipotti (1985)
- Pekka Puupää poliisina (1987)
- Ruuvit löysällä (1988)
- Pirtua, pirtua (1991)

=== Short films ===
- Seksiä nupissa (-)
- Päivä ratsastustalleilla (1989)
- Matkiva kulkuri (1989)
- Sexis spaketti ja Brunon parhaat (1989)

=== TV series ===
- Pekka Puupää tositoimissa (1982)
- Pekka Puupää seikkailee (1982)
- Pekko aikamiespoika (1992)
- Cafe Kirpputori (1996)
- Camping Satumaa (1998)

=== Video programmes ===
- Video Bingo (1992)
- Kauneimmat joululaulut (1992)
