= Neil Hardwick =

Finnish theatre and TV director and writer

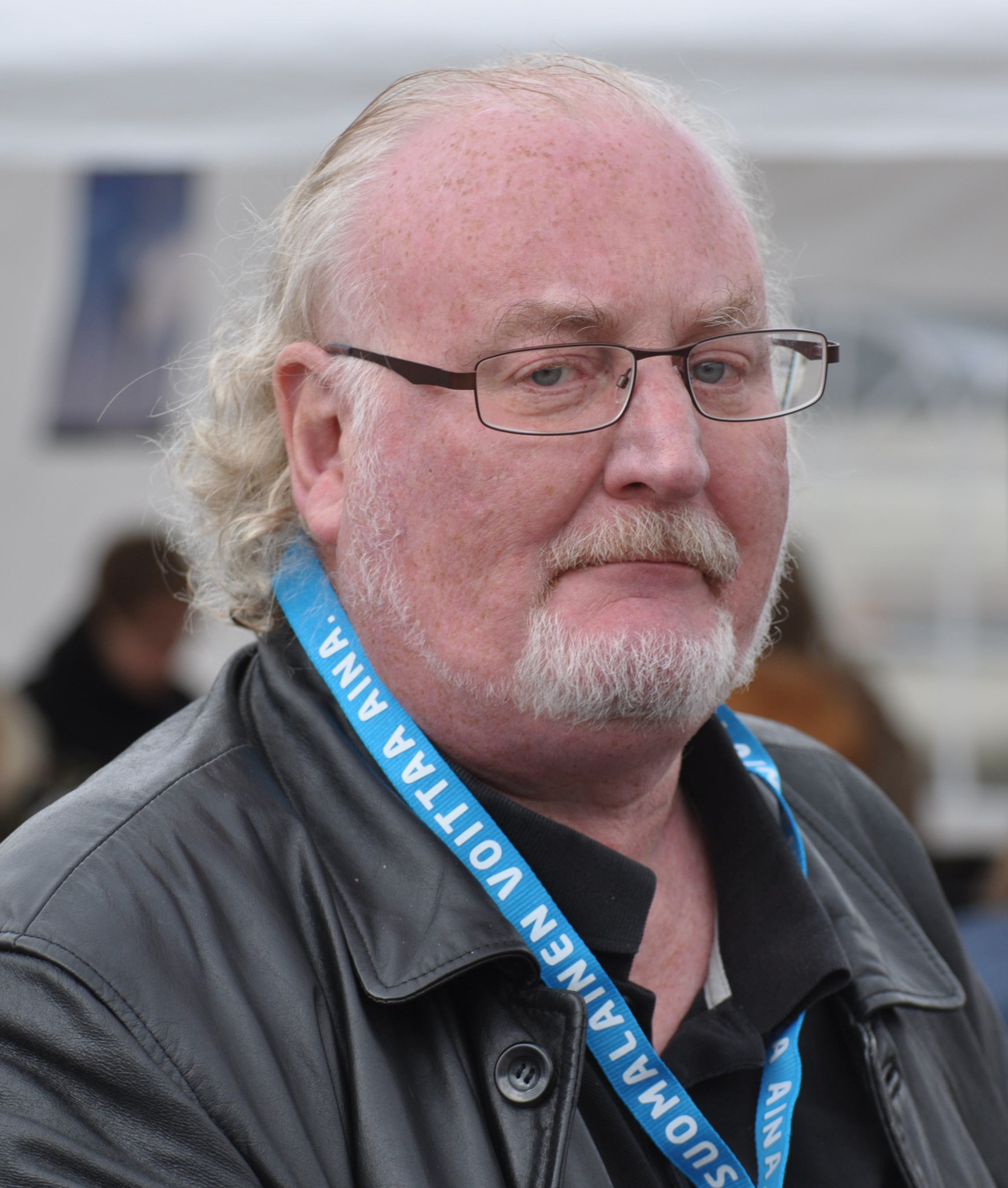
- Neil Hardwick in 2012
- Born: 22 July 1948 (age 76); Teversal, Sutton-in-Ashfield, England
- Occupation: Television presenter

Robert Neil Hardwick (born 22 July 1948 in Teversal, Sutton-in-Ashfield, England) is a British-born Finnish theatre and TV director and writer. He was raised in Teversal, near Nottingham. His father was a teacher, and Neil Hardwick has described himself as "a second generation non-miner".

== Biography ==
At age 11, Hardwick was admitted to boarding school with a scholarship. Already in his school years, Neil wrote, directed and often starred in many of his own plays. At age 18, he was drafted to work in the UK nuclear energy commission. Additional studies at King's College, Cambridge, led to a change in profession. There he found philosophy and the world of theatre at a new level.

After graduating from the University of Cambridge, Hardwick moved to Finland in 1969. He started his career as the voice of the English language school tapes of Finnish primary and high schools in the middle 1970s, and to the children of the 1960s and 1970s he became famous as the policeman of the children's language program Hello Hello Hello (1975). Hardwick's reputation as a Finnish director and keen-eyed depictor of the Finnish lifestyle stems from the YLE TV2 comedy series Tankki täyteen and Reinikainen. In Reinikainen, the protagonist is an elderly single policeman from the countryside, who is transferred to a city, where his verbal skill, cunning and nonchalant attitude often defuses dramatic situations and saves the day. His most artistically ambitious work is the TV series Pakanamaan kartta, dealing with total short term memory loss and ecoterrorism.

Hardwick has directed several revues and humour shorts, but is at his best as a depictor of the pathetically humorous daily life of the small man. He has also patiently acted as a bridge builder between the Finnish and English cultures, brought plays to Finland, and explained the Finnish lifestyle in British TV programs. He has repeatedly voiced his exasperation with the nanny state mentality of Finnish TV, but has also said that Finland is the only country where he "is someone". Hardwick did not manage to establish good relations with all his colleagues in the Finnish entertainment industry, as Spede Pasanen, for example, despised him. Hardwick is one of the few well-known immigrants to Finland who have learned the Finnish language fluently. His liberal views on immigration brought him into the negative attention of the late Helsingin Sanomat caricaturist Kari Suomalainen, whose nativist and anti-immigration views were at odds with Hardwick.

During 1995 Hardwick served as Professor of Cinematic Arts in the Academy of Fine Arts.

The voice of his son, Sam Hardwick, can be heard in a number of Nightwish songs.

== TV series and programs ==
- Hello hello hello 1975 (children's English language course; writer and actor)
- Kielipuoli potilas 1978 (comedy series; writer and director)
- Tankki täyteen 1978–1980 (comedy series; writer and director)
- Parempi myöhään 1979–1980 (entertainment series; sketch writer)
- Ollaan kuin kotonanne 1981–1982 (entertainment series; sketch writer)
- Reinikainen 1982–1983 (comedy series; writer and director, a role in the last episode)
- Saippuakauppias 1984 (palindromic comedy, writer and director)
- Sisko ja sen veli 1986 (dark comedy series; writer and director)
- Musta tuntuu 1985 (crime series; writer and director)
- Niilin lähteillä 1987 (autobiographical series; writer)
- Kieli poskessa 1987 (a documentary road movie shot in England, searching for the perfect pint and the meaning of life)
- Hardwick 1988–1989 (live talk show)
- Nyhjää tyhjästä 1991 (improvisation show from Ryhmäteatteri; host and director)
- Pakanamaan kartta 1991 (drama series; writer and director)
- Paluu Timbuktuun (travel series; host)
- Napaseutu 1994 (comedy series; co-writer with Raila Leppäkoski and director)
- Huomenta, Ilona, hyvästi 1996 (director)
- Hyvät, pahat ja rumat 1997 (live talkshow; co-host with Pauli Aalto-Setälä)
- Verisiskot 1997 (comedy series;director)
- Troubleshooter 2001 (comedy series with magic; director)
- Muisti palaa pohjaan 2004 (Finnish food memories; host)
- "Alright?Alright!" 2005 (English teaching comedy series; writer and director)

== Theatre directions ==
- Noises Off (Finnish), Tampereen teatteri 1983
- Waiting for Godot (Finnish) Tampereen teatteri 1984
- What the Butler Saw (Finnish), Helsingin kaupunginteatteri 1985
- Noises Off (Finnish), Suomen Teatterikorkeakoulu 1986
- Rumors (Swedish) Lilla teatern 1991
- Nyhjää tyhjästä(Finnish impro) Ryhmäteatteri 1991
- Rumors (Finnish) Lilla teatern 1992
- Other People's Money (Swedish and Finnish) Lilla teatern 1992
- Me And My Girl (musical, Swedish) Svenska teatern 1996
- Out of Order (Finnish) Helsingin kaupunginteatteri 2000
- Out of Order (Finnish) Tampereen työväenteatteri 2000
- Stepping Out (Finnish) Helsingin kaupunginteatteri, 2000
- The Merry Wives of Windsor (opera, Finnish) Seinäjoen kaupunginteatteri 2000
- Copenhagen (Finnish), Helsingin kaupunginteatteri 2001
- Noises Off (Finnish), Helsingin kaupunginteatteri 2002
- Noises Off(Finnish) Tampereen työväenteatteri 2003
- Fantasticks (musical, Finnish) Helsingin kaupunginteatteri, 2003
- Mulle kaikki heti (revue, Finnish) Helsingin kaupunginteatteri 2004
- Quartet (Finnish) Helsingin kaupunginteatteri 2004
- Pohjanmaan kautta (opera, Finnish) Ilmajoen musiikkijuhlat 2004
- Perfect Days (Finnish) Tampereen työväenteatteri 2005
- Hitchcock Blonde (Finnish) Helsingin kaupunginteatteri 2005
- Leading ladies (Finnish), Helsingin kaupunginteatteri 2005
- The Sheep Eaters (Finnish) Pyynikin kesäteatteri 2006
- Glorious! (Finnish) Helsingin kaupunginteatteri 2006
- The Importance of Being Earnest (Swedish) Helsingin kaupunginteatteri/Lilla teatern 2007
- The Producers (musical, Finnish) Helsingin kaupunginteatteri 2007
- The Importance of Being Earnest (Finnish) Helsingin kaupunginteatteri/Lilla teatern 2007
- Rumors (Finnish) Helsingin kaupunginteatteri 2008
- Spring Awakening (musical, Finnish) Helsingin kaupunginteatteri 2009
- Magic! (magic show) Helsingin kaupunginteatteri/Lilla teatern 2009
- Arsenic and Old Lace, Helsingin kaupunginteatteri 2010
- Molière: The Miser (Swedish) Helsingin kaupunginteatteri/Lilla Teatern 2011
- La Cage aux Folles (musical, Finnish) Helsingin kaupunginteatteri/Arena-näyttämö 2011
- Striking 12 (musical, Finnish) Helsingin kaupunginteatteri 2011
- One Man, Two Guvnors (Finnish) Helsingin kaupunginteatteri 2012
- Hotel Paradiso (Finnish) Helsingin kaupunginteatteri 2013
- The Ladykillers (Finnish) Helsingin kaupunginteatteri 2014
- Two into One (Finnish) Helsingin kaupunginteatteri 2015

== Film ==
Jos rakastat (Finnish musical, 2010)

== Bibliography ==
- Poistetut kohtaukset, WSOY 2025
- Hardwick's sauce eli Neilin tähteet: pakinoita. Tammi, 1988 (causerie, in Finnish and English on each opposite page)
- Paluu Timbuktuun: mitä todella tapahtui. Otava, 1996
- Hullun lailla. Otava, 1999
