= Kielo Tommila =

Finnish film actress and stage actress (born 1950)

- Born: 21 April 1950 (age 74); Kiukainen, Finland
- Years active: 1982-present
- Height: 5 ft 7 in (1.70 m)

Kielo Tommila (born 21 April 1950) is a Finnish film actress and stage actress.

Tommila was born in Kiukainen. She began acting in film in 1982 making several appearances such as in the 1983 James Bond spoof Agent 000 and the Deadly Curves opposite actors Ilmari Saarelainen and Tenho Sauren and in the 2001 Timo Koivusalo film Rentun ruusu more recently.

Tommila has also appeared in the theatre in her home town of Pori.
