= The Diary of a Worker =

1967 film

- Original Finnish film poster
- Directed by: Risto Jarva
- Written by: Risto Jarva; Jaakko Pakkasvirta
- Produced by: Risto Jarva
- Starring: Elina Salo
- Cinematography: Antti Peippo
- Release date: 26 February 1967
- Running time: 90 minutes
- Country: Finland
- Language: Finnish
- Budget: FIM 162,500

The Diary of a Worker (Finnish: Työmiehen päiväkirja, and also released as Not by Bread Alone) is a 1967 Finnish drama film directed by Risto Jarva. It was entered into the 5th Moscow International Film Festival.

== Plot ==
The film is a story about the marriage of worker Juhani Vehoniemi (Paul Osipow) and his wife, clerk Ritva Vehoniemi (Elina Salo). Long commutes and constant worries about money are reflected in the everyday life of a working-class family. Juhani gets a foreman's position in Tampere, which further distances him from his own wife even more. An unfortunate accident at work drives Juhani to seek comfort from Laura (Titta Karakorpi), a girlfriend of Ritva's cousin Erik (Matti Ruohola). Ritva begins to feel not only growing lonely, but also the suspicion that Juhani is hiding things from her.

== Cast ==
- Elina Salo as Ritva Vehoniemi
- Paul Osipow as Juhani Vehoniemi
- Titta Karakorpi as Laura
- Pentti Irjala as Ritva's uncle
- Matti Ruohola as Erik
- Heikki Hämäläinen as Matti
- Irma Seikkula as Hilda - uncle's wife
- Pertti Lumirae as Raimo
- Marja Korhonen as Ritva's boss
- Kullervo Kalske as Foreman in Helsinki
- Ritva Holmberg as Matti's wife
- Richard Ahlqvist as Karl
- Markku Salo as Juhani's Father
- Aino Lehtimäki as Ritva's Mother
