= The Solar Wind (film) =

- Original Finnish film poster
- Directed by: Timo Linnasalo
- Written by: Ilpo Tuomarila; Timo Linnasalo
- Based on: The Solar Wind by Kullervo Kukkasjärvi
- Produced by: Kullervo Kukkasjärvi
- Starring: Paavo Piskonen; Lilga Kovanko; Antti Litja
- Cinematography: Heikki Katajisto
- Edited by: Juho Gartz
- Music by: Antti Hytti
- Production company: Filminor
- Distributed by: Suomi-Filmi
- Release date: 31 October 1980
- Running time: 122 minutes
- Country: Finland
- Language: Finnish
- Budget: FIM 2,358,100

The Solar Wind (also known as Sun Wind; Finnish: Aurinkotuuli) is a 1980 Finnish science fiction drama film directed by Timo Linnasalo. It is based on the 1975 novel of the same name by Kullervo Kukkasjärvi, while Kukkasjärvi himself works as the film's producer. Like the novel, the film tells the story of a gravity scientist who died in 1970 and is brought back to life in 1999 after being deep-frozen in a world that has faced an eco-catastrophe. The film stars Paavo Piskonen, Lilga Kovanko and Antti Litja.

== Plot ==
Erik Rankamaa (Paavo Piskonen), a gravity scientist who died in 1970 in his prime, is suddenly resurrected in 1999 after being deep-frozen for a long time. During the recovery process that occurs with his awakening, Erik meets his old acquaintance, Fabian (Erkki Pajala), who works as a janitor at the institute. Although the man is old and alcoholic, his wife is already dead and his daughter Helena (Marja-Leena Keski-Kuha) has leukemia caused by plutonium. Other things have also happened: Fabian's second daughter Laura (Lilga Kovanko) works at Erik's former vacant place and is married to a doctor named Paul (Antti Litja), who treats Erik. Laura and Paul's son Jan (Jani Puroranta) suffers from breathing problems and receives continuous oxygen therapy. The world has also changed: the birds die one after the other and the trees in the yard are always taken to shelter during the rain.

While Erik tries to find out why he has been brought back to life in the first place, the financial institute comptroller (Antti Aro) complains to Laura about the expenses caused by Erik and at the same time asks her the same question. Laura, who carried out Erik's awakening, explains that she wants to know from Erik how the world has changed from his point of view, but the suspicious institute comptroller gives Laura two weeks to prove that Erik is of some use to the research.

Erik has a prostate problem, for which Paul suggests hot baths for Erik. In addition to this, he often suggests frequent ejaculations and arranges for Maire (Armi Sillanpää), an intimate nurse, for him to use, but Erik does not feel ready for sex. However, he goes to the cemetery with Maire and sees his own gravestone. From the window of his own room, Erik sees bodies being collected from the side of the street by the garbage truck, and in that connection he tries to strangle Maire, who has taken up intimate care.

Due to his sensational revival, Erik is interviewed at the World Congress of Physicists, but he gets nervous when asked how the world looks to him. He goes to Fabian's place to calm down, where he encounters Helena picking berries from a berryless bush and talking about the "promised road to happiness". Erik, who ended up drunk during the sauna, takes out his bitterness on Laura after learning that he only has two weeks to live. After Erik visits the institute comptroller with Laura, he hears that Paul has announced that the medical institution will cover the costs of Erik's treatment.

Erik prepares to celebrate the extension of his life with Laura when Paul intervenes. Erik confesses to him that he loves Laura, but Paul replies that Laura will decide the matter herself. At home, Paul accuses Laura of being a whore, but Erik and Laura don't end up in bed until the next meeting, on Laura's own initiative. Erik says he wants a child with Laura. Between the two of them, Laura confesses to Erik that she was behind Erik's awakening. Erik gets anxious again when he has to question the right and purpose of his existence, the way the world looks now.

Later, Helena dies. Fabian, who got drunk at the funeral, blames everyone and especially Erik. A depressed Fabian drinks himself into such a bad state that he ends up in the hospital. When Erik visits him, Fabian brings up the idea of suicide, and they agree to do it together in Erik's dilapidated cabin. Laura is not ready to follow Erik, who prepares her by comparing gravity and the closeness of human relationships. In the end, Fabian and Erik, who support him, go to their deaths together.

The film ends with a scene where Laura later cries at Erik's grave, which is located in the cemetery next to the landfill. Jan comforts her mother by saying, "Mom, don't cry. Erik died a long time ago."

== Cast ==
- Paavo Piskonen as Erik Rankamaa
- Lilga Kovanko as Laura
- Antti Litja as Paul
- Erkki Pajala as Fabian
- Jani Puroranta as Jan
- Armi Sillanpää as Maire
- Marja-Leena Keski-Kuha as Helena
- Olli Alho as TV journalist
- Antti Aro as institute comptroller

Also, Kullervo Kukkasjärvi makes a cameo role as a man in front of congress building.

== Production ==
The film was shot in the summer of 1980 in Helsinki, among others at Hietalahdentori, Technical University, Merikasarmi, Suvilahti's power plant and Natural History Museum. The Finnish Film Foundation supported the production phase of the film with FIM 1.3 million.

== Reception ==
The film was released on October 31, 1980. It was not a success with the audience, as only 10,000 viewers went to see the film in its theatrical run.

At the time of its release, The Solar Wind was judged to be ambitious, but even then slow and rigid. The work of the main actors, Piskonen, Lilga Kovanko and Antti Litja, was praised, but the film was considered too graveness. Nowadays, the film is considered an example of a serious social plot of Finnish sci-fi, leaning towards the destruction of humanity and the existential crisis of the individual, which is also represented by Risto Jarva's Time of Roses (1969) and Timo Humaloja's The White Dwarf (1986).

Erkka Lehtola from Aamulehti expresses in his review (published in November 1980) how "a more airy and open approach would have been good for the film." Lehtola continues that "focusing and tightening the rhythm would have helped The Solar Wind move forward briskly. Now – especially at the halfway mark – the film just drags slowly forward. Of course, not lazily and carelessly, more like intentionally and deliberately - but still so, so slowly."

== See also ==
- List of Finnish films of the 1980s
