= Tommila =

Tommila is a Finnish surname.

== Geographical distribution ==
As of 2014, 76.0% of all known bearers of the surname Tommila were residents of Finland (frequency 1:8,967), 16.7% of the United States (1:2,675,935), 4.7% of Sweden (1:259,125) and 1.0% of Estonia (1:165,209).

In Finland, the frequency of the surname was higher than national average (1:8,967) in the following regions:

1. Satakunta (1:932)
2. Kymenlaakso (1:3,165)
3. Southwest Finland (1:7,196)

== People ==
- Päiviö Tommila (1931–2022), Finnish historian
- Kielo Tommila (born 1950), Finnish film and stage actress
- Jorma Tommila (born 1959), Finnish actor
- Juho Tommila (born 1993), Finnish ice hockey defenceman
- Onni Tommila (born 1999), Finnish child actor
