= Sajakorpi =

Sajakorpi is a Finnish surname. Notable people with the surname include:

- Ismo Sajakorpi (born 1944), Finnish television writer, screen writer, and television director
- Aku Sajakorpi (born 1976), Finnish actor
