= Matti Mäntylä =

Finnish actor

- Born: 9 December 1945 (age 79); Turku, Finland

Matti Mäntylä (born 9 December 1945, in Turku, Finland) is a Finnish actor who has worked predominantly on Finnish television.

== Career ==
Mäntylä began acting in 1979 and has made many appearances mostly on TV in Finland since the early 1980s although he had appeared in several films such as the 1983 James Bond spoof Agent 000 and the Deadly Curves where he acted alongside actors Ilmari Saarelainen and Tenho Sauren.

He had a small role in the 2005 Timo Koivusalo film Kaksipäisen kotkan varjossa alongside actors such as Mikko Leppilampi. More recently he appeared on Finnish television in FC Venus, 2005 and in two episodes of "Presidentit" in 2006.
