= Rosvopaisti =

Type of roast meat

Rosvopaisti (Finnish lit. “robber’s roast”; Swedish: Rövarstek) is roast meat cooked in a cooking pit. It is said to have Mongolian origins and to have become generally known through Veikko Huovinen’s novel Lampaansyöjät (The Sheep Eaters).

Rosvopaisti can be made with almost any meat: lamb, mutton, pork, bear, reindeer, elk etc. The pit, preferably soil of sand or clay, is about one metre long, 70 cm wide and a half metre deep where stones or bricks are heated up for several hours. The meat is wrapped in layers of dampened parchment paper, newspaper and aluminium foil. The coals are pushed aside and placed upon the meat parcel(s) at the bottom of the pit. Then the coals are covered with another layer of soil. A fire is started on top of the meat on the ground to ensure proper temperature. It takes approximately between 8 and 12 hours to cook the roast.

== See also ==
- Earth oven
- Hāngī
