= Kiukainen =

Former municipality of Finland

Coordinates: 61°12′25″N 22°05′00″E

Location of Kiukainen in Finland

Kiukainen (Swedish: Kiukais) is a former municipality of Finland. It was consolidated with Eura on 1 January 2009.

It is located in the Satakunta region. The municipality had a population of 3,408 (2003) and covered an area of 149.88 km^{2} of which 0.22 km^{2} is water. The population density was 22.7 inhabitants per km^{2}.

In Kiukainen there are many ancient gravehills made from piled stones. Largest of them is called Kuninkaanhauta, "the king's grave", located in the Panelia village. It is the biggest of its type in Nordic countries. The Stone Age Kiukainen culture is named after Kiukainen municipality.

The municipality was unilingually Finnish.

== Town twinning ==
Before the 2009 consolidation, Kiukainen was twinned with:

- Boksitogorsk, Leningrad Oblast, Russia (current status unknown)

== People born in Kiukainen ==
- Timo Kalli (1947 – )
- Kielo Tommila (1950 – )
- Eveliina Suonpää (1995 – )
