= Poet and Muse =

1978 film

- Original Finnish film poster
- Directed by: Jaakko Pakkasvirta
- Written by: Titta Karakorpi; Jaakko Pakkasvirta
- Produced by: Jaakko Pakkasvirta
- Starring: Esko Salminen
- Cinematography: Esa Vuorinen
- Release date: 13 October 1978
- Running time: 105 minutes
- Country: Finland
- Language: Finnish

Poet and Muse (Finnish: Runoilija ja muusa) is a 1978 Finnish drama film directed by Jaakko Pakkasvirta. The film is about the Finnish poet Eino Leino and the women of his life: a conflict-filled marriage with Freya Schultz and a love affair with the poet L. Onerva. It was entered into the 11th Moscow International Film Festival.

== Cast ==
- Esko Salminen as Eino Leino
- Katja Salminen as Freya Schoultz
- Elina Salo as L. Onerva
- Paavo Liski as Kasimir Leino
- Pertti Palo as Artturi Lönnbohm
- Marita Nordberg as Freya's mother
- Heidi Krohn as Olga Lönnbohm
- Kalle Holmberg as Akseli Gallén-Kallela
- Henri Kapulainen as Jean Sibelius
- Carl-Axel Heiknert as Old Sibelius
- Jaakko Pakkasvirta as Otto Manninen
- Virpi Uimonen as Anni Swan
- Esa Pakarinen Jr. as von Numers
