= The Sheep Eaters =

1970 novel by Veikko Huovinen

- Author: Veikko Huovinen
- Original title: Finnish: Lampaansyöjät: Suomalainen reippailutarina
- Language: Finnish
- Genre: comedy
- Publisher: WSOY
- Publication date: 1970
- Publication place: Finland
- Media type: Print (Hardback)
- Pages: 168
- ISBN: 951-0-01837-6
- OCLC: 636233007

The Sheep Eaters (Finnish: Lampaansyöjät) is a humorous Finnish novel written by Veikko Huovinen in 1970, subtitled “Finnish Outing Story.” It tells the story of two men, Sepe and Valtteri, who embark on a special car trip in August. The intention is to hunt sheep, although towards the end of the book they get enough sheep meat and otherwise only camp, also in neighboring countries. That part reflects on the way the world is going, and in fact the events only serve as a framework for the essential content of the book, that is, the discussions of “male people” marked by the humor typical of Huovinen, which mixes the boundaries of folk and high culture.

The novel has appeared in a Swedish translation, Fårätarna, 1977, but not in English language.

The book was made into a film by the same name directed by Seppo Huunonen in 1972, starring Leo Lastumäki (Valtteri) and Heikki Kinnunen (Sepe). According to Leo Lastumäki, after the film there were cases where a model of Sepe and Valtteri's sheep hunting had actually been taken. The film was a success, it got viewers more than all the other domestic films of the year combined. The Sheep Eaters play was seen in 2006 at the Pyynikki Summer Theatre in Tampere, starring Kai Lehtinen and Antti Raivio.

The novel made famous rosvopaisti (Finnish lit. ‘robber’s roast’) that Sepe and Valtteri made from their prey.

== See also ==
- Veitikka
