= Antti Peippo =

Antti Eerikki Peippo (10 September 1934 – 29 June 1989) was a Finnish cinematographer, director, set designer, screenwriter and actor. He was the cinematographer in all but one of director Risto Jarva's films. After Jarva died in 1977, Peippo continued to work in other productions of Jarva's production company Filminor.

== Career ==
Peippo's only feature film direction was the science fiction comedy Ihmemies (1979). After that he worked mostly making personal, essay-like short films and documentaries until his death of cancer in 1989. Peippo received a Jussi Award in 1972 for his short film Viapori – Suomenlinna. His most highly acclaimed work is the autobiographical childhood memoir Proxy (Sijainen) (1989).

== Selected filmography ==
=== As cinematographer ===
- Onnenpeli (1965) also screenwriter
- Työmiehen päiväkirja (1967) also actor
- Ruusujen aika (1969) also set designer
- Bensaa suonissa (1937) also screenwriter
- Yhden miehen sota (1974) also set designer and actor
- Mies, joka ei osannut sanoa ei (1975) also actor
- Loma (1976) also actor
- Jäniksen vuosi (1977) also actor
- Vartioitu kylä 1944 (1978)

=== As director ===
- Viapori – Suomenlinna (1972)
- Suomalainen pöydänkattaja (1973)
- Patterns for the Plays (Leikkien mallit) (1975)
- Pictures of the Past (Menneen ajan kuvat) (1977)
- Wonderman (Ihmemies) (1979)
- Boy of Granite (Graniittipoika) (1979)
- The Walls Have Eyes (Seinien silmät) (1981)
- A Stranger in Finland (Sivullisena Suomessa) (1983)
- Three Secrets (Kolme salaisuutta) (1984)
- Risto Jarva, työtoverini (1984)
- Ateneum Christmas Magazine (Ateneumin joululehti) (1985)
- Nykytaiteen museo (1985)
- On Horseback Across Asia (Ratsastus Aasian halki) (1987)
- Hotelli Belveder (1987)
- Proxy (Sijainen) (1989)
- The Heart of the Nation (Valtakunnan sydän) (1989)
