= Home for Christmas (1975 film) =

1975 film

- Film poster
- Directed by: Jaakko Pakkasvirta
- Written by: Väinö Pennanen; Jaakko Pakkasvirta
- Produced by: Jaakko Pakkasvirta
- Starring: Paavo Pentikäinen
- Cinematography: Esa Vuorinen
- Release date: 28 February 1975
- Running time: 89 minutes
- Country: Finland
- Language: Finnish

Home for Christmas (Finnish: Jouluksi kotiin) is a 1975 Finnish drama film directed by Jaakko Pakkasvirta. It was entered into the 9th Moscow International Film Festival.

== Cast ==
- Paavo Pentikäinen as Urho Suomalainen
- Irma Martinkauppi as Sirkka Suomalainen
- Kaisa Martinkauppi as Leena Suomalainen
- Jari Erkkilä as Jari Suomalainen
- Selma Miettinen as Urho's mother
- Aapo Vilhunen as Sister's husband
- Tuija Ahvonen as Sirkka's sister
- Timo Martinkauppi as Alaja

== See also ==
- List of Christmas films
