= Martti Pennanen =

Finnish actor

- Born: 8 December 1923; Tervola, Finland
- Died: 17 December 2010 (aged 87); Tampere, Finland
- Occupation: Actor
- Years active: 1963–2000

Martti Pennanen (8 December 1923; Tervola, Finland – 17 December 2010; Tampere, Finland) was a Finnish film and stage actor.

Pennanen began acting relatively late in life, in his late 40s, in 1970 and has made many appearances in Finnish film throughout the 1970s and 1980s. He appeared in films such as the 1983 James Bond spoof Agent 000 and the Deadly Curves, where he acted alongside actors Ilmari Saarelainen and Tenho Sauren. However, after 1990, he has appeared only on television in Finland and retired in 1999 at the age of 76.

Pennanen was married.
