= Stellar wind (disambiguation) =

Stellar wind is the flow of particles from the atmosphere of stars.

Stellar wind may also refer to:

- Stellar Wind, the code name for certain United States government information collection activities
- Solar wind, stellar winds emitted by Earth's sun
- Stellar Wind (horse), a Thoroughbred racehorse

== See also ==
- Solar wind (disambiguation)
