= Veitikka =

1971 novel by Veikko Huovinen

- Author: Veikko Huovinen
- Original title: Veitikka - A. Hitlerin elämä ja teot
- Language: Finnish
- Publication date: 1971
- Publication place: Finland

Veitikka - A. Hitlerin elämä ja teot is a pseudo-historical black humor novel written by Veikko Huovinen. Its opening suggests that it is a product of original research into the personal history of Adolf Hitler, undertaken to dispel the myths concerning Hitler and attempting to understand his motivations in beginning the Second World War. However, the novel is in fact an elaborate mockery of Hitler, using numerous false documents in order to tell an absurd history of the dictator. A Finnish word veitikka of the novel's name literally means "little rogue" or "little rascal".

== Background ==
By 1970, Veikko Huovinen had established himself as a prominent author of folksy comedy novels in Finland. He had begun exhibiting a strong affinity to pacifism with his novel Rauhanpiippu in 1956, but during the 1960s had not written anything obviously political. Veitikka, therefore, was a shock to his fans and readers in general, as using Adolf Hitler as a vehicle for comedy was unheard of at that time.

Huovinen had even as a young man been fascinated with Hitler; his father had been a fervent opponent of Nazis during the Second World War (despite Finland's quasi-alliance with Germany), and Huovinen wondered why anyone would follow such an obvious madman. By 1970, his despair over the failings of mankind had crystallized to an idea to write about a dictator - Adolf Hitler.

== Plot summary ==
The novel begins with the birth of Adolf Hitler and his early childhood. Huovinen describes the young Adolf as a rebellious child with a weak constitution, but with an intimidating gaze and vulgar speech. Also, his uncanny ability with a rifle is commented upon. Adolf eventually ends up as a vagrant in the streets of Vienna, selling mediocre watercolor paintings. The novel suggests that during this time Hitler met Joseph Goebbels, with whom he had an instant rapport with his vulgarities and anti-semitism - the first radical departure from actual history.

The novel swiftly moves to the First World War, and describes Hitler's exploits as a behind-the-lines scout sniper - who, in his spare time, criticizes the Army High Command and tells jokes so disgusting that even hardened soldiers stay silent. Also his foul-smelling flatulence is commented upon.

While following Hitler's rise to power from the Great Depression to the Second World War, the novel makes its most outrageous claim; Hitler and Goebbels jointly conceived the Second World War in order to "teach the pompous German nation a lesson" with two distinct operations. The first, "Operation Ulex" has the goal of starting a war and reaching decisive victories in the short term - while making strategic mistakes that will hurt in the long run. The second, "Operation Saublöder Arsch" involves deliberately losing the war, while prolonging it to the bitter end with as much bloodletting and destruction as possible. When all is lost, Hitler and Goebbels leave the corpses of look-alikes behind, escaping the siege of Berlin with guns blazing and board a Focke-Wulf Fw 200 Condor bound for South America. When en route, they express their disgust for the servile, obedient Germans and fantasize about Latin women.

== Analysis ==
Veitikka was a considerable departure for Huovinen. His previous novels had been humanist in nature, but Veitikka had a misanthropic tone. Huovinen asserts throughout the novel that men who follow charismatic leaders are fools, and it is a characteristic of mankind throughout its history. He does go on that the only weapon against such dictators is humor, because if one laughs at a dictator, the dictator loses the credibility he needs. He encourages the reader to laugh at Hitler, so that no one might take Nazism seriously ever again.

== See also ==
- The Sheep Eaters
