= Jaakko Pakkasvirta =

Finnish film director and screenwriter (1934–2018)

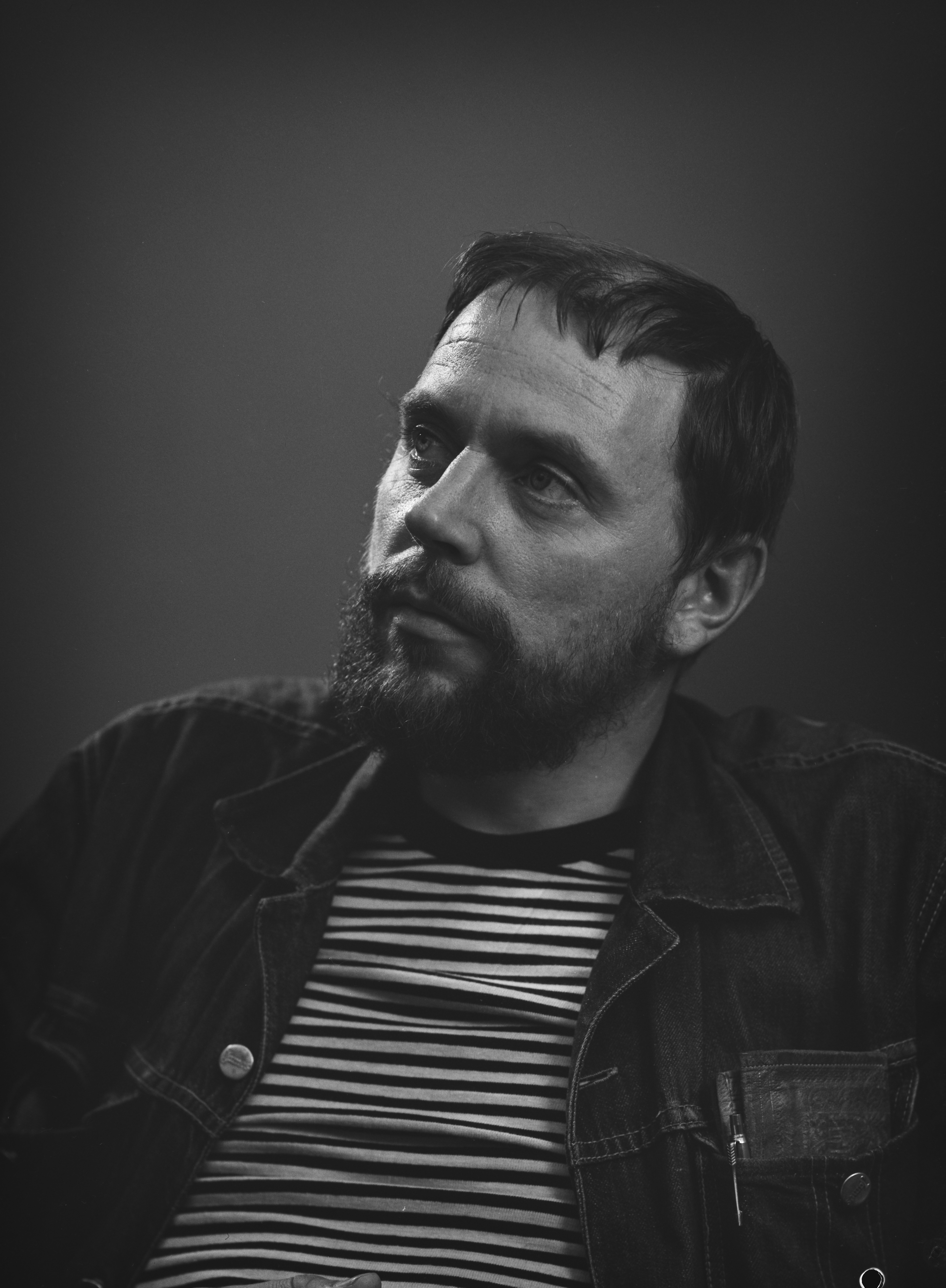
- Jaakko Pakkasvirta in 1969
- Born: 28 November 1934; Simpele, Finland
- Died: 23 March 2018 (aged 83); Vantaa, Finland
- Occupations: Film director Screenwriter
- Years active: 1958–2000

Jaakko Juhani Pakkasvirta (28 November 1934 – 23 March 2018) was a Finnish film director and screenwriter. He directed more than 30 films between 1958 and 2000. His 1975 film Home for Christmas was entered into the 9th Moscow International Film Festival. His 1978 film Poet and Muse was entered into the 11th Moscow International Film Festival.

== Partial filmography ==
- Sankarialokas (1955) as Alokas
- Tyttö lähtee kasarmiin (1956) as Alokas
- Pekka ja Pätkä Suezilla (1958) as Vartija (uncredited)
- Sotapojan heilat (1958) as Alokas
- Mies tältä tähdeltä (1958) as Erkki Paarala
- Patarouva (1959) as Stable master
- Iloinen Linnanmäki (1960) as Sorri
- Rakas... (1961) as Jaska
- Meren juhlat (1963) as Jaska, artist
- Hopeaa rajan takaa (1963) as Ese Wist
- X-paroni (1964) as James
- Onnenpeli (1965) as Jussi
- The Diary of a Worker (1967) as Priest (voice)
- Time of Roses (1969, director)
- Niilon oppivuodet (1971) as Interviewer in rock club (uncredited)
- Home for Christmas (1975, director)
- Poet and Muse (1978) as Otto Manninen
- Sign of the Beast (1981, director)
- Ulvova mylläri (1982) as Jeesus (voice)
- Valkoinen kääpiö (1986) as Tomas Borg
- Linna (1986) as Bürgel / Narrator
