= Esa Pakarinen Jr. =

Finnish actor (1947–2026)

- Born: 12 December 1947; Varkaus, Finland
- Died: 12 February 2026 (aged 78); Helsinki, Finland
- Occupations: Actor; comedian; director; puppeteer
- Years active: 1977–2026
- Father: Esa Pakarinen

Esa Pakarinen Jr. (12 December 1947 – 12 February 2026) was a Finnish actor.

== Life and career ==
Pakarinen Jr. was the son of actor Esa Pakarinen, who was known for his roles as Pekka Puupää in the Pekka and Pätkä films. Like his father, Esa Pakarinen Jr. acted in Finnish films. He also made a special contribution to the development of Finnish puppet theater as both an actor and a director.

After graduating from the Helsinki Theatre Academy, Pakarinen first worked at the City Theater of Joensuu, after which he moved to the City Theatre in Kotka and later, the Helsinki City Theatre. After this period, Pakarinen turned to puppet theater. In 1989, Pakarinen moved back to his childhood town of Varkaus, where he performed his own solo puppet theater. Pakarinen also studied to be a reflexologist.

Pakarinen was granted a State's Artist Pension in 2014.

Pakarinen died in Helsinki on 12 February 2026, at the age of 78.

== Selected filmography ==
- The Year of the Hare (Jäniksen vuosi, 1977)
- Poet and Muse (Runoilija ja muusa, 1978)
- The Test-tube Adult and Simo's Angels (Koeputkiaikuinen ja Simon enkelit, 1979)
- Sign of the Beast (Pedon merkki, 1981)
- That Kiljunen Family (Kiljusen herrasväki, 1981)
- Jon (1983)
- The Home Street (Kotikatu, 1995–2012)
