= Pirtua, pirtua =

- Directed by: Visa Mäkinen
- Written by: Visa Mäkinen; Kari Levola; Ilkka Liettyä; Jouni Virta
- Produced by: Visa Mäkinen
- Cinematography: Keijo Mäkinen; Visa Mäkinen
- Edited by: Sini Mosti
- Music by: Jouni Virta
- Production company: Tuotanto Visa Mäkinen
- Release date: 20 December 1991 (Finland)
- Running time: 94 minutes
- Country: Finland
- Language: Finnish

Pirtua, pirtua is a 1991 Finnish drama movie directed by Visa Mäkinen. The plot consists of a young man fighting against bootleggers in his home village during Finnish prohibition.

The movie, which was Visa Mäkinen's first attempt at a serious movie, ended up a box office flop, with only 1,650 tickets sold and caused losses of a million Finnish markka. Mäkinen gave up on making movies as a result. When Pirtua, Pirtua aired on the Finnish television channel MTV3 in May 1995, it was seen by 287,000 viewers. In June 2001, another 180,000 television viewers saw the movie.

== Critical reception ==
In the movie guide Video-opas in 1994, critic Olavi Similä praises the depiction of the subject matter, but finds the content mediocre, giving the movie a grade of two starts out of five.
