= Sign of the Beast =

1981 film

- Original Finnish film poster
- Finnish: Pedon merkki
- Directed by: Jaakko Pakkasvirta
- Written by: Jaakko Pakkasvirta; Timo Humaloja; Arvo Salo
- Based on: A Gloomy Soliloquy by Olavi Paavolainen
- Produced by: Jaakko Pakkasvirta
- Starring: Esko Salminen
- Cinematography: Esa Vuorinen
- Music by: Henrik Otto Donner
- Release date: 25 September 1981
- Running time: 120 minutes
- Country: Finland
- Language: Finnish

Sign of the Beast (Finnish: Pedon merkki) is a 1981 Finnish drama film co-written and directed by Jaakko Pakkasvirta. It is based on the 1946 book A Gloomy Soliloquy (Finnish: Synkkä yksinpuhelu) by Olavi Paavolainen, based on his war diaries written during the Winter War and the Continuation War. The film was selected as the Finnish entry for the Best Foreign Language Film at the 54th Academy Awards, but was not accepted as a nominee.

== Cast ==
- Esko Salminen as Kaarlo
- Irina Milan as Karin
- Tom Wentzel as Helmut von Stein
- Hannu Lauri as Olavi
- Vesa-Matti Loiri as Usko
- Jukka-Pekka Palo as Lieutenant Valonen
- Esa Pakarinen Jr. as War Photographer
- Martti Pennanen as General
- Yrjö Parjanne as Captain
- Kalevi Kahra as Seargeant Major

== See also ==
- List of submissions to the 54th Academy Awards for Best Foreign Language Film
- List of Finnish submissions for the Academy Award for Best Foreign Language Film
