= Esa Vuorinen =

Finnish cinematographer (born 1945)

- Born: 26 June 1945 (age 80); Helsinki, Finland
- Occupation: Cinematographer
- Years active: 1969-present

Esa Vuorinen (born 26 June 1945) is a Finnish cinematographer. At the 26th Guldbagge Awards he won the award for Best Cinematography for the film Good Evening, Mr. Wallenberg. He has worked on more than 60 films since 1969.

== Selected filmography ==
- Home for Christmas (1975)
- Poet and Muse (1978)
- Sign of the Beast (1981)
- The Undressing (1986)
- Good Evening, Mr. Wallenberg (1990)
- Drömkåken (1993)
- The Border (2007)
- Dear Alice (2010)
