= Ritva Valkama =

Finnish actress (1932–2020)

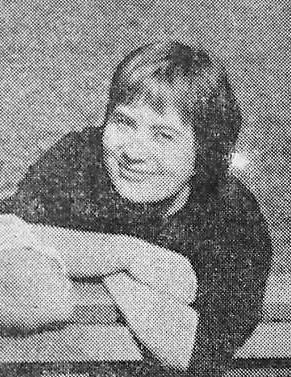
Valkama in 1961

Ritva Valkama-Palo (born Ritva Karin Valkama; 13 November 1932 – 8 May 2020) was a Finnish actress. She was known for her comic roles and appeared in theatres, films and on television.

Television series Parempi myöhään... (1979–1980) made Valkama a household name in Finland. She starred in the show with actor Pentti Siimes, and often they were mistaken for a married couple. She has also been seen in films since 1954.

Ritva Valkama's father, Reino Adolf Valkama, was also an actor.

She was married to actor Pertti Palo from 1957 until his death in 2010, and together they had three daughters.

== On television ==
- Parempi myöhään... (1979–1980)
- Reinikainen (1982)
- Musta tuntuu (1985)
- Tiikerihai (1988)
- Napaseutu (1994)

== Selected filmography ==
- Olemme kaikki syyllisiä (1954)
- Virtaset ja Lahtiset (1959)
- Häpy Endkö? Eli kuinka Uuno Turhapuro sai niin kauniin ja rikkaan vaimon (1977)
- Herr Puntila and His Servant Matti (1979)
- Tulitikkuja lainaamassa (1980)
- Liian iso keikka (1986)
- Anni tahtoo äidin (1989)
