= Hāngī =

Traditional Māori cooking method

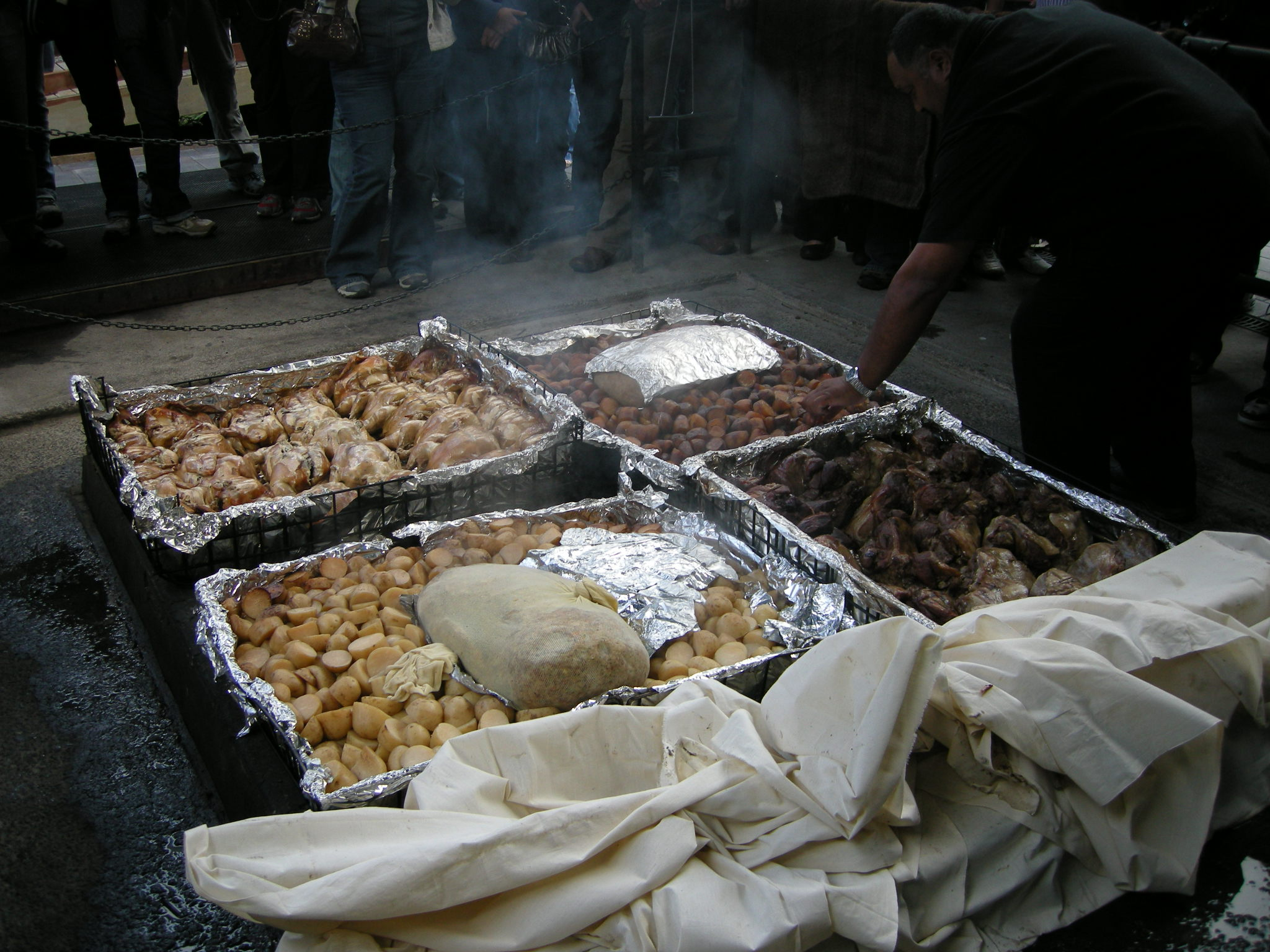
Putting down a hāngī

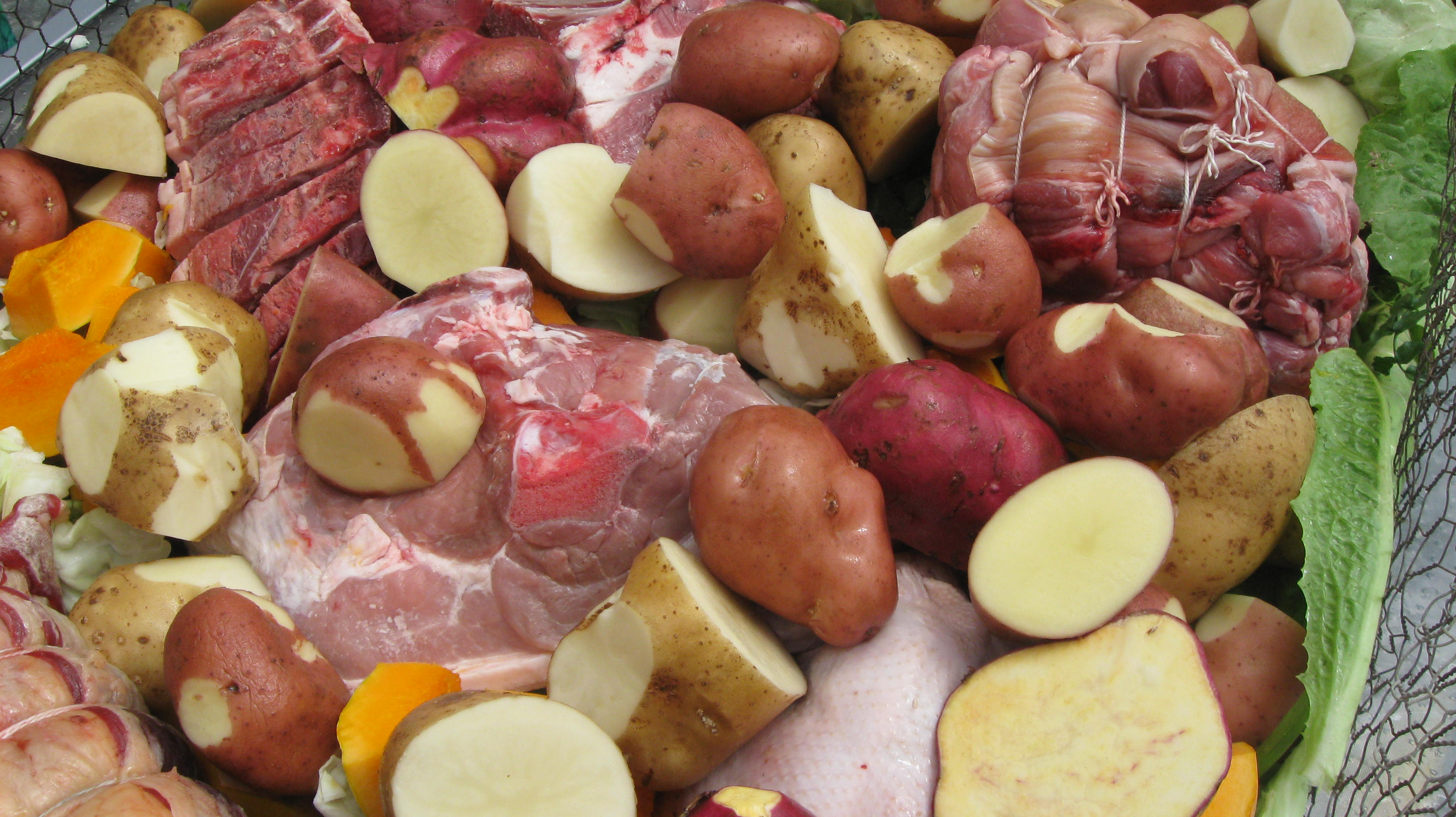
Raw meat and vegetables for the hāngī

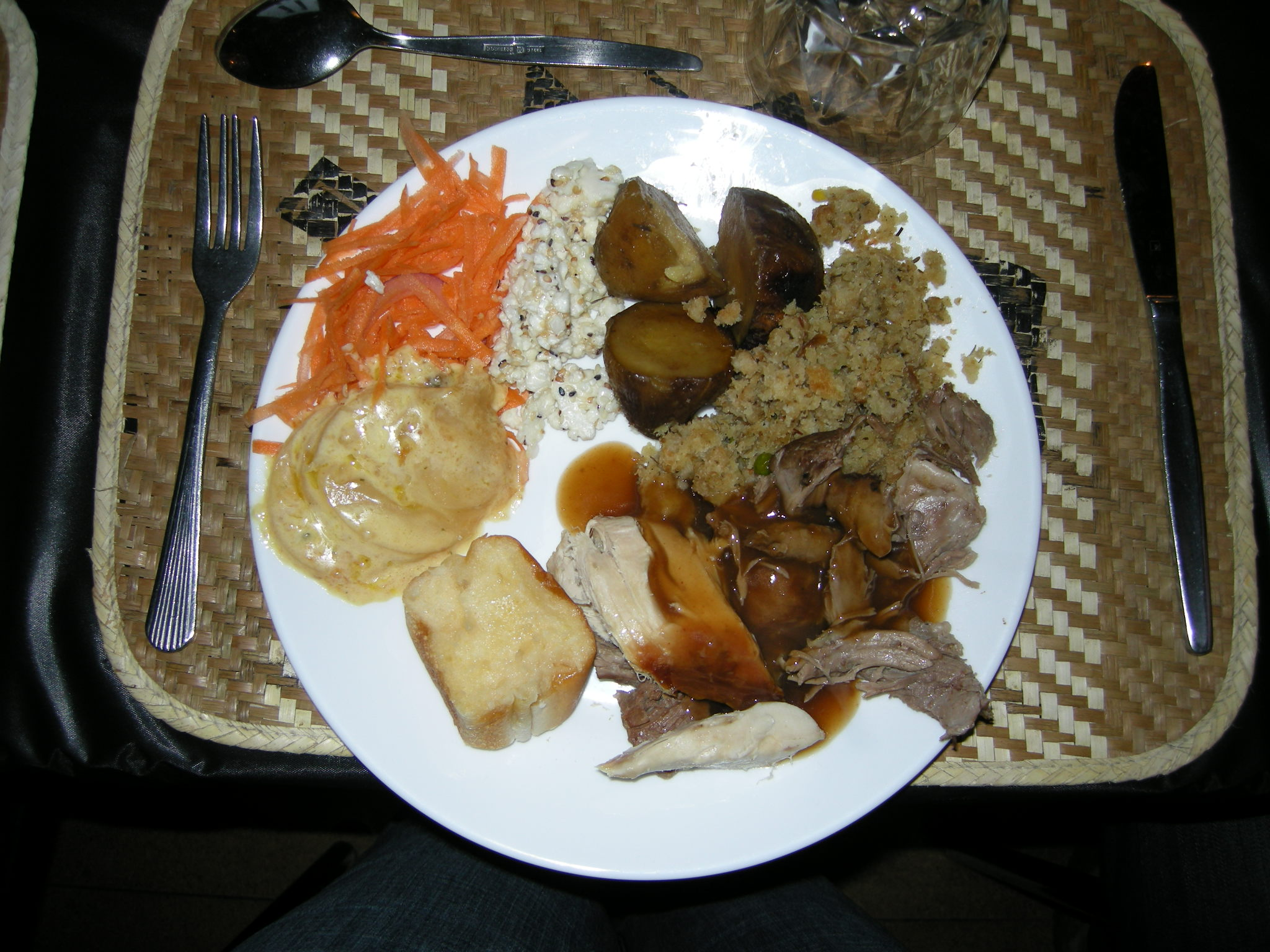
Hāngī dinner

Hāngī (Māori: [ˈhaːŋiː]) is a traditional New Zealand Māori method of cooking food using heated rocks buried in a pit oven, called an umu.‍ It is still used for large groups on special occasions, as it allows large quantities of food to be cooked without the need for commercial cooking appliances.‍

== Process ==
To "lay a hāngī" or "put down a hāngī" involves digging a pit in the ground, heating stones in the pit with a large fire, placing baskets of food on top of the stones, and covering everything with earth for several hours before uncovering (or lifting) the hāngī.‍ Hāngī experts have developed and improved methods that have often, like the stones themselves, been handed down for generations.

Common foods cooked in a hāngī are meats such as lamb, pork, chicken and seafood (kaimoana), and vegetables such as potato, kūmara (sweet potato), oca (referred to as "yams" in New Zealand), pumpkin, squash, taro and cabbage.‍‍

A hāngī pit is dug to a depth of between 50–100 centimetres (20–40 inches), sufficient to hold the rocks and two stacked baskets of food. Logs, usually mānuka or kānuka, are stacked over the pit with the rocks, commonly andesite or basalt, on top. The logs are lit and are left to burn for 3 to 4 hours, heating the rocks to 600–700 degrees Celsius (1,100–1,300 degrees Fahrenheit). Once the fire has burned down, the hot embers and most of the ash are removed. Alternatively, the fire is built separately and the hāngī pit is dug while the fire is burning, with the hot rocks transferred to the pit after heating.‍‍

Meanwhile, the food is prepared and placed in wire baskets lined with either puka, banana or cabbage leaves, or aluminium foil. The meat basket is placed at the bottom of the pit, with the vegetable basket placed on top. If seafood is included, it is placed on top of the vegetable basket. Then, wet sacks or cloths are placed on top of the baskets, and the whole pit is covered with earth. The hāngī takes approximately 2 to 4 hours to cook. A person supervises the hāngī while it cooks, covering up any escaping steam with earth.‍‍‍

Once the hāngī is cooked, the earth is carefully removed from the top of the pit, followed by the sacks or cloth. The baskets are lifted out of the pit, and the food taken to the kitchen for carving and serving.‍‍

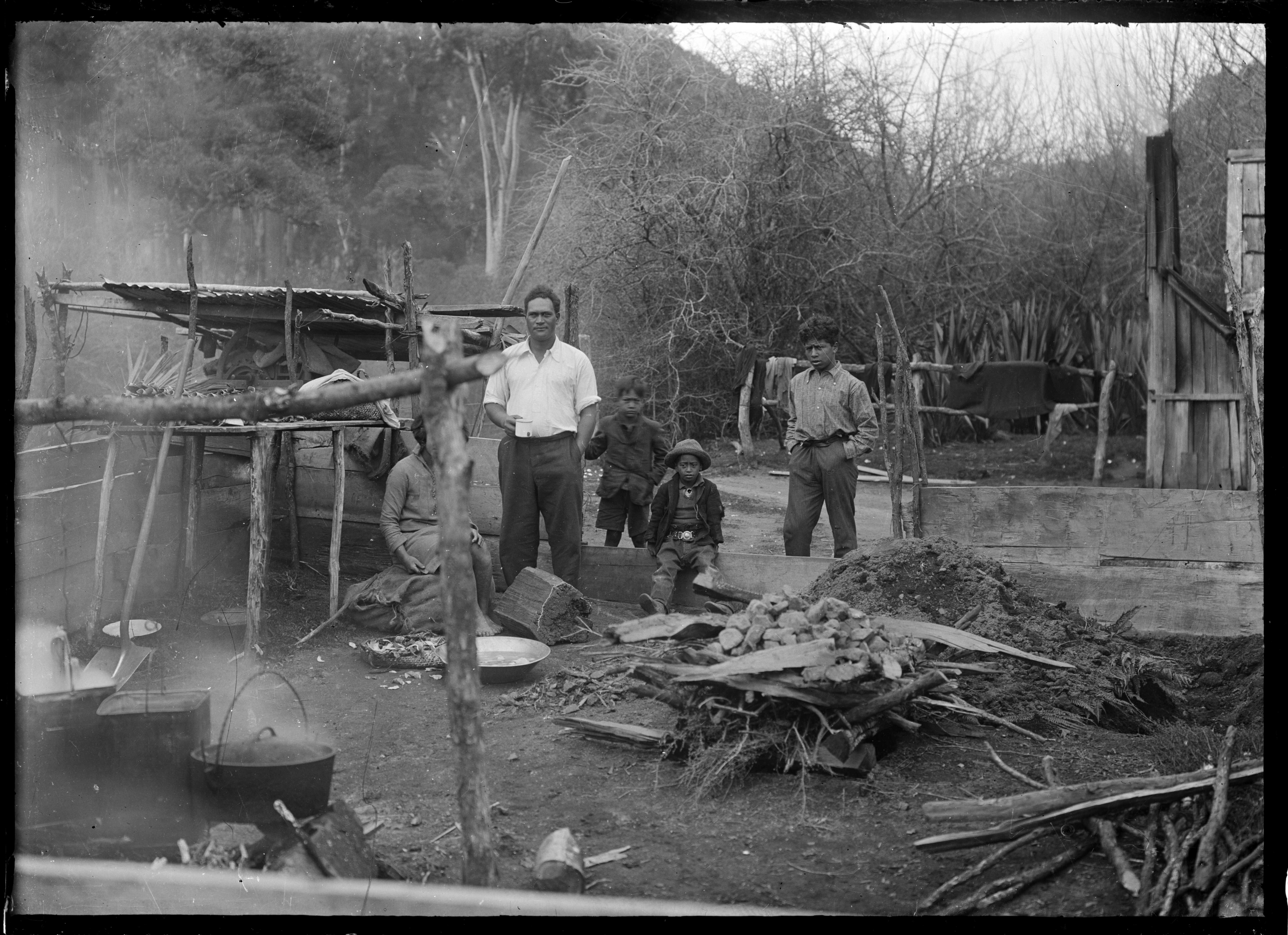
Around a hāngī at Te Whaiti in 1930

Prior to European colonisation and the introduction of metalworking and wire, food was laid between bark, large leaves and other vegetation. Wire baskets became widely used in the early 19th century, with sacking and cloth replacing leaves and bark as the covering of choice.‍

In the early 21st century, gas-heated stainless-steel "hāngī machines" are sometimes used to replicate the style of cooking without the need for a wood fire, rocks and a pit.‍

== Early umu-tī ==
Evidence from early Polynesian settler sites in New Zealand such as Wairau Bar and in coastal Otago Peninsula from about 1280 shows a significant number of large cooking pits or umu which were designed to cook tī kōuka or various other species of Cordyline.‍

The distinguishing feature of an umu-tī was its large size compared to a normal earth oven. The long, carrot-shaped tap root was cooked in a large, stone-lined pit for between one and two days. The result was a fibrous mass of sweet pulp with a bitter aftertaste. This was a common east Polynesian practice in the Cook Islands and Society Islands,‍ and the remains of large umu have also been found in the Kermadec Islands. Investigation in Otago shows that most of these pits were used only once or twice.‍

== Popular culture ==
The hāngī is part of the Aoteroa\New Zealand cultural identity. It is often part of the kai (food) portion of the pōwhiri. The hāngī has been adapted for a chip flavour by Heartland and a pizza made by New Zealand pizza chain Hell Pizza called "Unearthed".

The New Zealand country music artist Dennis Marsh also has a popular song called "Hāngī Tonight", which is New Zealand gold certified. The song references the hāngī in terms of popular foods including pūhā, pork and pipi. The song references the method of the hot rocks as part of the process and Māori cultural celebrations including haka, waiata and poi.

== See also ==
- Clam bake – Communal dining tradition from New England
- Curanto – Chilote method of cooking food
- Kālua – Traditional Hawaiian method of cooking
- Lovo – Simple pit for cooking
- Pachamanca – Peruvian dish baked in an earthen oven
- Rosvopaisti – Type of roast meat
