= Hunters of the Night (film) =

Yön saalistajat
- Finnish VHS cover of Hunters of the Night.
- Directed by: Visa Mäkinen
- Written by: Kari Levola
- Produced by: Visa Mäkinen
- Starring: Ilmari Saarelainen; Kauko Helovirta; Matti Mäntylä; Seppo Kulmala
- Distributed by: Tuotanto Visa Mäkinen
- Release date: October 5, 1984
- Running time: 91 min
- Language: Finnish

Hunters of the Night (Yön saalistajat) is a 1984 Finnish action thriller film produced and directed by Visa Mäkinen. The film is about a police officer who infiltrates a criminal organization operating in Pori.

The film shows violence and nudity more frankly than was generally the case in Finnish entertainment films of the 1980s; upon release, the film was rated K-18 by the Finnish Board of Film Classification.

Hunters of the Night received mixed reviews from critics. It was seen in theaters by only 1,670 viewers, but in its first television broadcast in 1987 by almost one and a half millions, although MTV3 initially showed the reels in the wrong order and restarted the show so that the total TV broadcast lasted two and a half hours.

== See also ==
- List of Finnish films of the 1980s
