= Tankki täyteen =

- Genre: Comedy
- Created by: Neil Hardwick; Jussi Tuominen
- Starring: Sylvi Salonen; Tauno Karvonen; Ilmari Saarelainen; Tuire Salenius
- Country of origin: Finland
- No. of seasons: 2
- No. of episodes: 11

Original release
- Network: Yle TV2
- Release: September 15, 1978 – November 8, 1980

Tankki täyteen (literal translation "tank to fullness" i.e. "fill her up") is a Finnish sitcom television series produced by Yle. The series was written by Neil Hardwick and Jussi Tuominen and directed by Esko Leimu together with Hardwick. It was one of the most watched and re-broadcast Finnish television comedy series of the 1980s. It first aired on Yle TV2 between 1978 and 1980. The first production season (1978) comprised six episodes and the second (1980) five episodes.

== Premise ==
The centerpiece of the series is Emilia and Sulo Vilén's (Sylvi Salonen and Tauno Karvonen) gas station, which is hardly visited by customers, as there is no longer access to the service station from the new bypass. Vilén's adult son Juhana (Ilmari Saarelainen), as well as the unmarried bar assistant Ulla (Tuire Salenius, the priest (Erkki Siltola) and the regular guest, the village constable Artturi Reinikainen (Tenho Saurén) are among the key figures in the series. Constable Reinikainen was so popular that he later got his title series, Reinikainen, which was among the first spin-off series on Finnish television. Tuominen has characterized Juhana Vilén as a common alter ego between him and Hardwick.

== Location ==
The filling station in the series's exterior pictures was the Kesoil service station, which was demolished in the late 1980s and was located in the center of Ylöjärvi, west of the junction of the Vaasantie and Kuruntie roads, about 100 meters from the Kuruntie bridge towards Vaasa. During the filming of the series, a Kale family lived in the bar section of the service station, with the workshop stable on the workshop side. An apartment building has been built on the site. The service station had been completed in 1960 for the Autori service station chain in the Tampere and Pori regions and switched to Kesoil in 1964.

== Episodes ==
1. Season
No. overall	Title (with English translation)	Original air date	
1.	Supisuomalainen mykkäkoulu ("The Most Finnish Silent School")	September 15	1978
2.	Rovastin mopo ("Moped of Priest")	September 29	1978
3.	Piispantarkastus ("Visitation")	October 13	1978
4.	Vahtikoira ("Housedog")	October 27	1978
5.	Lauantai-illan huumaa ("Ecstasy of Saturday Night")	November 10	1978
6.	Totuuden hetki ("The Moment of Truth")	November 24	1978

2. Season
No. overall	Title (with English translation)	Original air date	
7.	Maallamuuttajat ("Moving to the Countryside")	March 15	1980
8.	Onnea uuteen taloon ("Good Luck with Your New House")	March 29	1980
9.	Kotikäynti ("House Call")	April 12	1980
10.	Paranemaan päin ("On the Mend")	April 26	1980
11.	Ympäri käydään, yhteen tullaan ("Going Around and Coming Together")	November 8	1980

== Re-broadcasts ==
Even today, the series enjoys a strong cult following in Finland. The latest rerun of the series was shown on TV2 in the spring of 2020, when all episodes of the series were shown. The theater version of the series, compiled from episodes 1–6, was presented at the Orimattila local summer theater, which premiered on July 4, 2008. In the summer of 2009 and 2010, Kauhajoki's Teatteri Kajo also performed in the first production season spiced with music and in 2012 the second production season. The musical version by Teatteri Eurooppa Neljä premiered at the Sappee Summer Theater in Pälkäne on June 15, 2011.

=== Home releases ===
- Huoltamo halvalla (episodes 1–6) VHS (2001)
- Yrittänyttä ei laiteta – halvalla (episodes 7–11) VHS (2002)
- Kaikki halvalla (all episodes) DVD (2002)

== See also ==
- List of Finnish television series
