= Sylvi Salonen =

Finnish actress

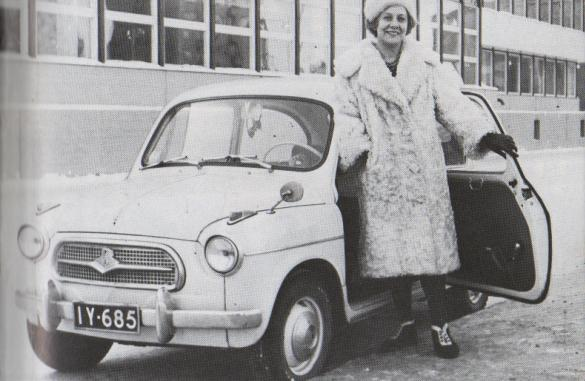
Salonen in 1959

Sylvi Inkeri Salonen (1 March 1920 – 23 December 2003) was a Finnish actress. Most of her career, 1949−1985, she worked for Tampereen Työväen Teatteri while also appearing on television and in films. The term "diva" was often attached to her name.

During her final years, Salonen arranged a statue of a black panther to be placed on her grave.

== On television ==
- Heikki ja Kaija (1961−1971)
- Tankki täyteen (1978−1980)
- Nitroliiga (1993)
- Tuliportaat (1998)

== In films ==
- Tavaratalo Lapatossu & Vinski (1940)
- SF-Paraati (1940)
- Opri (1954)
- Elokuu (1956)
- Kuuma kissa? (1968)
- Kun Hunttalan Matti Suomen osti (1984)
- The Big Freeze (1993)
