= Borrowing Matchsticks =

- Directed by: Leonid Gaidai; Risto Orko
- Written by: Original play: Algot Untola; Screenplay: Leonid Gaidai; Tapio Vilpponen; Vladlen Bakhnov; Risto Orko
- Starring: Yevgeny Leonov; Vyacheslav Nevinny; Georgy Vitsin; Rita Polster; Ritva Valkama; Sergey Filippov
- Music by: Aleksandr Zatsepin
- Production companies: Mosfilm; Suomi-Filmi
- Release date: 1980
- Running time: 94 min (Soviet version); 100 min (Finnish version)
- Countries: Soviet Union; Finland
- Language: Russian / Finnish

Borrowing Matchsticks (Russian: За спичками, romanized: Za spichkami, Finnish: Tulitikkuja lainaamassa) is a Soviet–Finnish historical adventure comedy film produced by Mosfilm and Suomi-Filmi in 1980.

The film is based on the novel with the same title, Tulitikkuja lainaamassa, by Algot Untola. The novel was also put to film in 1938, Borrowing Matchsticks (1938 film).

== Cast ==
- Yevgeny Leonov (Antti Ihalainen)
- Vyacheslav Nevinny (Jussi Vatanen)
- Georgy Vitsin (Tahvo Kennonen)
- Rita Polster (Anna-Lisa Ihalainen)
- Ritva Valkama (Miina)
- Sergey Filippov (Hyvärinen)
- Nina Grebeshkova (Hyvärinen's wife)
- Vera Ivleva (Anna-Kaisa)
- Galina Polskikh (Kaisa Karhutar)
- Mikhail Pugovkin (chief of Police)
- Kauko Helovirta (lieutenant Torvelainen)
- Leo Lastumäki (farmer Partanen)
- Olavi Ahonen (Ville Huttunen)
- Leonid Kuravlyov (peasant)
- Viktor Uralsky (peasant)
