= Kiukainen culture =

The Kiukainen culture was the last Stone Age culture of the southwestern coast of Finland, dating to 2400–1500/1300 BC. Its material culture combined elements from Pit–Comb Ware and Corded Ware cultures. The area of Kiukainen culture ranged from the shore of Kvarken to Vyborg Bay. Kiukainen culture is named after the Kiukainen municipality where the Finnish archaeologist Matti Kauppinen found the first artifacts .

== Additional sources ==
- Zvelebil, Marek (2009-06-18). Hunters in Transition: Mesolithic Societies of Temperate Eurasia and Their Transition to Farming. Cambridge University Press. pp. 83–. ISBN 9780521109574.
