= Paul Osipow =

Paul Osipow (born 1939) is an artist from Finland. He studied in Academy of Fine Arts and Vapaa taidekoulu in Helsinki and in University of Texas, Austin, USA

Osipow made his breakthrough in Finnish art world in 1960, and his career has continued for decades. He used to paint with acrylic, but changed to oil paintings. Osipow became first famous with his pop-art paintings. Osipow’s exhibitions in the 1990s revealed his gradual movement away from a pure geometric expression to one more painterly and unrestricted, inspired by the pioneers of modern painting and with extensive samplings from late impressionism, cubism and fauvism.

He received the Swedish Prince Eugen Medal in 1989.
