= Antti Litja =

Finnish film and television actor (1938–2022)

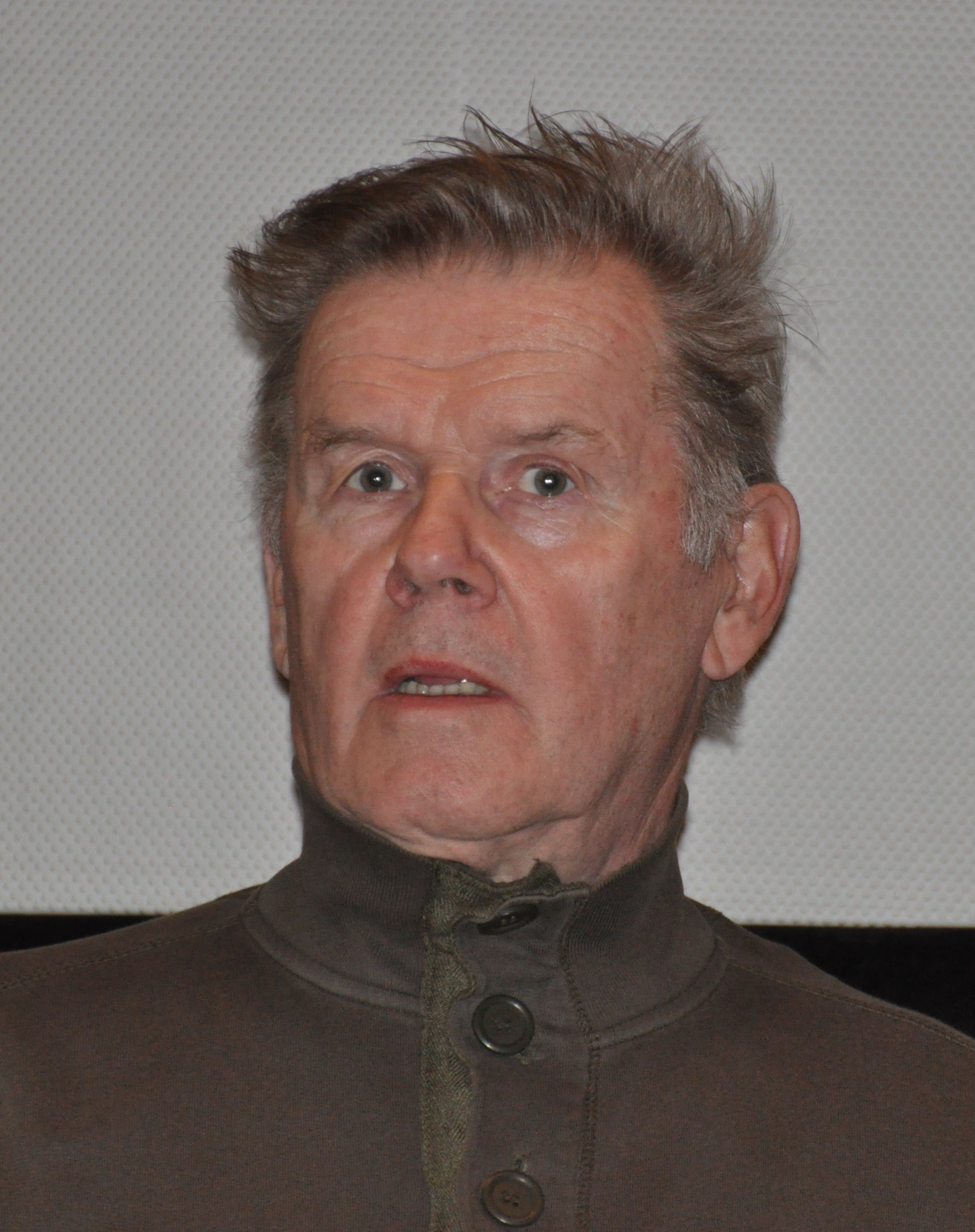
- Litja in 2011
- Born: 21 February 1938; Antrea, Finland
- Died: 13 July 2022 (aged 84); Helsinki, Finland

Antti Vilho Olavi Litja (21 February 1938 – 13 July 2022) was a Finnish actor.

== Career ==
Litja made over 60 film and television appearances since 1959. A prominent figure in Finnish film in the 1970s and 1980s, since the mid-1990s he mostly appeared on television.

Litja played the main character in the 1977 film The Year of the Hare about a Finnish man from Helsinki who leaves to find a new life in the wilderness.

== Selected filmography ==
- The Year of the Hare (1977)
- Wonderman (1979)
- The Solar Wind (1980)
- That Kiljunen Family (1981)
- The Clan – Tale of the Frogs (1984)
- Farewell, Mr. President (1987)
- The Glory and Misery of Human Life (1988)
- A Charming Mass Suicide (2000)
- Princess (2010)
- The Grump (2014)
