= Leo Lastumäki =

Finnish actor

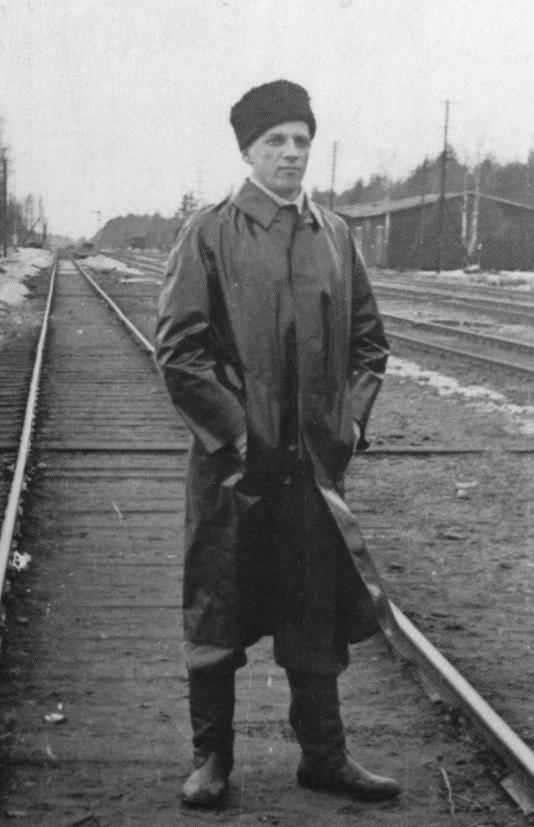
Lastumäki in 1945

Leo Antero Lastumäki (28 December 1927 – 29 January 2012) was a Finnish actor, born in Liminka. He worked in theaters, films and on television, often collaborating with Spede Pasanen. Lastumäki worked as a freelancer from 1973. He died in Kemi, aged 84.

== Selected filmography ==
- The Harvest Month (1956)
- Komisario Palmun erehdys (1960)
- Speedy Gonzales – noin 7 veljeksen poika (1970)
- The Sheep Eaters (1972)
- Borrowing Matchsticks (1980)
- Uuno Turhapuro menettää muistinsa (1982)
- Koirankynnen leikkaaja (2004)
