= Ismo Sajakorpi =

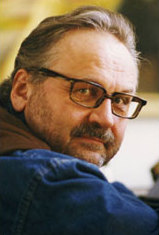
Ismo Sajakorpi

Ismo Sajakorpi (born 18 May 1944, Tampere, Finland) is a Finnish television writer, screen writer and television director.

He has written the scripts for Finnish films such as the 1983 James Bond spoof Agent 000 and the Deadly Curves.

However his career both in script writing and directing have been predominantly based on Finnish television, where he was a member and scriptwriter of the comedic variety group Kivikasvot.
