= Portraits of Women =

- Original Finnish film poster
- Directed by: Jörn Donner
- Written by: Jörn Donner
- Produced by: Arno Carlstedt; Jörn Donner
- Starring: Ritva Vepsä; Jörn Donner; Kirsti Wallasvaara; Aarre Elo
- Cinematography: Heikki Katajisto
- Edited by: Jörn Donner
- Music by: Claes af Geijerstam
- Production companies: FJ-Filmi Oy; Jörn Donner Productions Oy
- Distributed by: Finnkino Oy (Finland); Stockholm Film (Sweden)
- Release dates: 6 February 1970 (Finland); 9 October 1970 (Sweden)
- Running time: 90 minutes
- Country: Finland
- Language: Finnish
- Budget: FIM 655,500

Portraits of Women (Finnish: Naisenkuvia) is a 1970 Finnish erotic comedy film written and directed by Jörn Donner. The film stars Donner himself as a pornographic film maker named Pertti who returns to Finland from the United States, having to work with miserably small budgets and with amateurish co-workers. The film was Donner's third consecutive film in which he himself played the male lead.

The Finnish Board of Film Classification promptly granted the film a screening license, ordering the film to be placed in the extremely rare 30 percent tax bracket and to cut six parts of the sex scenes. Despite everything, three members of the board also would have liked to ban the film from under 18s. However, after Donner complained about the decision of the board, the tax was reduced to 10 percent and cuts were ordered to only two places for a total of one minute. In Finland, the board's decision attracted great attention, and Donner himself took advantage of the uproar by writing the book Tapaus Naisenkuvia ("The Case of Portraits of Women").

With 316,859 viewers, Portraits of Women was the second most watched film of 1970 after Akseli and Elina in Finnish cinemas. The film caused a lot of controversy when it came out, including showing Donner's erect penis shot from a distance for a few seconds, and the film received mixed reviews from critics. Despite the controversy, the film's cinematographer Heikki Katajisto won the Jussi Award for best cinematography in 1971.

== Plot ==
Pertti (Jörn Donner) is a pornography-oriented filmmaker who has returned to Finland from America and settled in with his friends from his student days, the married couple Jussi (Aarre Elo) and Liisa (Kirsti Wallasvaara). At a crayfish party organized by them, he meets biology teacher Saara Suominen (Ritva Vepsä), who is about to divorce her husband. Saara rejects Pertti's attempts to bring her home. Instead, Pertti manages to seduce his old friend Liisa in the morning. Saara, on the other hand, settles her relationship with her husband at night and moves in with Jussi and Liisa in the morning.

Pertti familiarizes himself with Finnish cinema, whose love scenes he considers tame and unnecessarily artistic. He himself wants to make a new kind of Finnish romance film, but the actress he interviews refuses to undress and says she is only interested in a political film. In the end, Pertti catches two agreeable young people, Sven (Henrik Gräno) and Ulla (Marianne Holmström), who have appeared in the "Summer Love" material he has seen, but who would also like to make a political film.

Saara takes Pert on a city tour and they have a drink together. The filming of Pertti's film starts at a villa located on the archipelago. Despite their differences, Pertti and cinematographer Peter von Spaak (Jaakko Talaskivi), who supports a "modern" vision of cinema, try to capture Ulla and Sven's spontaneous love on film.

Pertti goes to meet Saara at the summer villa, where she has cycled for the weekend. Saara still has such a cold attitude towards Pertti that Pertti first plans to drive to Helsinki for the night. However, Saara asks him to stay and over the course of the night they become lovers. They also sleep together at Liisa and Jussi's place, and when Liisa finds out, she threatens to reveal to Jussi that she slept with Pertti herself. The atmosphere starts to become so chilling that Pertti and Saara start looking at the apartment they share.

Ulla says that she had an argument with Sven, and Pertti decides to continue filming as the other side of the couple making love. During filming, Peter has to constantly warn the eager Pertti to keep his head out of the picture. However, Sven appears at the villa and reconciles with Ulla. At the same time, Liisa has revealed her relationship with Pertti to Saara, who in turn has found Pertti's notebook with the contact information and characteristics of 38 women. Pertti explains to an enraged Saara that his interest in women is purely professional, and they end up making love in Saara's school ballroom.

Sven and Ulla announce that they are getting married. Pertti pays for the marriage certificate and offers them a wedding lunch, where the film producer (Lennart Lauramaa) brings the information that Pertti is threatened with a lawsuit for violating sexual discipline. Pertti decides to escape the country and gets on the ship. Ulla and Sven also get a lawsuit, but they get through it by showing their marriage certificate. Saara goes after the ship in a motorboat and after catching up with Pertti, she confesses her love overflowing. To Pertti's shock, Saara throws the films he took with him into the ship, but Pertti manages to hide the negatives. "Let's make porn together," says Saara. "Let's make love first," Pertti replies, and they make love while the "Maamme" song plays.

== Cast ==
- Jörn Donner as Pertti 'Pertsa', maker on sexfilm
- Ritva Vepsä as Saara Suominen, teacher of biology
- Kirsti Wallasvaara as Liisa, teacher of gymnastic
- Aarre Elo as Jussi, engineer
- Marianne Holmström as Ulla Magdalena Carlsson
- Henrik Gräno as Sven Alarik Pettersson
- Lennart Lauramaa as the film producer
- Hannu Oravisto as a schoolboy
- Jaakko Talaskivi as Peter von Spaak, film cinematographer

== Production ==
The film was shot in Helsinki, Bromarv and Kirkkonummi during August and October in 1969.

Donner admitted that he struggled with the subject of the film. "Somehow, however, I gather my strength so much that I half-seriously write a plot which, when read, sounds pretty crazy. I suddenly notice that the picture of Pertti, the producer returning to Finland, is a picture of me. Pertti is quite stupid, many people think I'm stupid. Pertti makes porn, I'm considered a porn film as a creator. Pertti has relationships with women, with the hostess of the crayfish party, with a young girl, Saara. All kinds of gossip about me."

== Reception ==
The film received a mixed reception from critics after release. Matti Rosvali from Aamulehti states in his review "shortly and without malice: Jörn Donner's new film Portraits of Women is an unenthusiastic and indifferent film." Eeva Järvenpää from Helsingin Sanomat says in her review that "the positive aspect of the film is its open undisguised self-irony", continuing that "in some places Portraits of Women offers really enjoyable visual humor. But if Donner, instead of obviously focusing on planning how to succeed in defeating the censors and beating drastically for money, would have thought a little more about his film as a whole, Portraits of Women could have been much funnier." Olli Tuomola from Turun Sanomat admits that although "after the overheated drumming and still not allowed to expect anything from Portraits of Women", he states in his assessment that "maybe that's why it somehow leaves a funny, liberated impression."

In the 1994 Video-opas film reference book edited by Bello Romano, Esko Rautakorpi mentions in his assessment that "Portraits of Women has a lot of talking and naked people, but still contains a very mediocre story." Rautakorpi gives the film two stars out of five.

On the Finnish site Elitisti, the film has received an average rating of 3.5/5.0 based on the evaluation of seven critics. Mika Vallinen, who gives them a 4.0/5.0 rating, describes the film in his 2004 review as "a hell of a funny and interesting description of (porn) filmmaking and bohemian people in Finland during the changes, and probably the only domestic film where people fuck each other in a tram while an old woman is horrifying next to them."

== See also ==
- List of erotic films
- List of Finnish films of the 1970s
