= Time of Roses =

- Original Finnish film poster
- Directed by: Risto Jarva
- Written by: Risto Jarva; Jaakko Pakkasvirta
- Produced by: Risto Jarva
- Starring: Arto Tuominen; Ritva Vepsä; Tarja Markus
- Cinematography: Antti Peippo
- Edited by: Risto Jarva; Jukka Mannerkorpi; Lasse Naukkarinen
- Music by: Henrik Otto Donner; Kaj Chydenius; Eero Ojanen
- Release dates: 7 February 1969 (Finland); 19 October 1970 (United States)
- Running time: 107 minutes
- Country: Finland
- Language: Finnish
- Budget: FIM 320,000

Time of Roses (Finnish: Ruusujen aika) is a 1969 Finnish science fiction film directed by Risto Jarva, about a documentary filmmaker in 2012 trying to find the true essence of a glamour model, dead for forty years, for a TV film biography. The script was written by Peter von Bagh, Jarva, and Jaakko Pakkasvirta. The model was played by Ritva Vepsä and the documentarian by Arto Tuominen. The film premiered on 2 July 1969 in Finland, while the US premiere of the film was in New York City on October 19, 1970.

An American indie film distributor and classic film restoration company, Deaf Crocodile Films, acquired the North American distribution rights to the film in June 2022. Deaf Crocodile Films announced that they will release a new 4K restoration of the film.

== Plot ==
The story is set in the year 2012. According to the official review of the Institute of History, after the restless times of the 1960s and 1970s, society has become human-centered, democratic and liberal. With the meritocratic social structure in effect, class boundaries have disappeared, and the keyword is "progress". Raimo Lappalainen (Arto Tuominen), who makes documentaries for television, is preparing for a TV program that deals with Finland in the 60s by telling the story of the short-lived nude model Saara Turunen (Ritva Vepsä). Through the life stages of Saara, who died in an accident in the 1970s, Raimo gets to know the time before her birth, and notices that the ideas from fifty years ago still exist; although technology has seemingly improved human life, the spiritual class conflict of the 1960s still simmers beneath the surface, which, among other things, culminates in the death of a strike general at a nuclear power plant.

== Cast ==
- Arto Tuominen as Raimo Lappalainen
- Ritva Vepsä as Saara Turunen / Kisse Haavisto
- Tarja Markus as Anu Huotari
- Eero Keskitalo as Raimo's Colleague
- Kalle Holmberg as Kisse's Colleague
- Eila Pehkonen as Head of History Institute
- Matti Lehtelä as Photographer
- Unto Salminen as Saara's Ex-Husband
- Paavo Jännes as Saara's Youth-Time Lover
- Aino Lehtimäki as Saara's Youth-Time Acquaintance
- Hilkka Kesti as Dancer
- Allan A. Pyykkö as Scientist on TV
- Jukka Mannerkorpi as Chauffeur
- Urpo Peltonen as Caretaker
