= Veikko Huovinen =

Finnish novelist and forester (1927–2009)

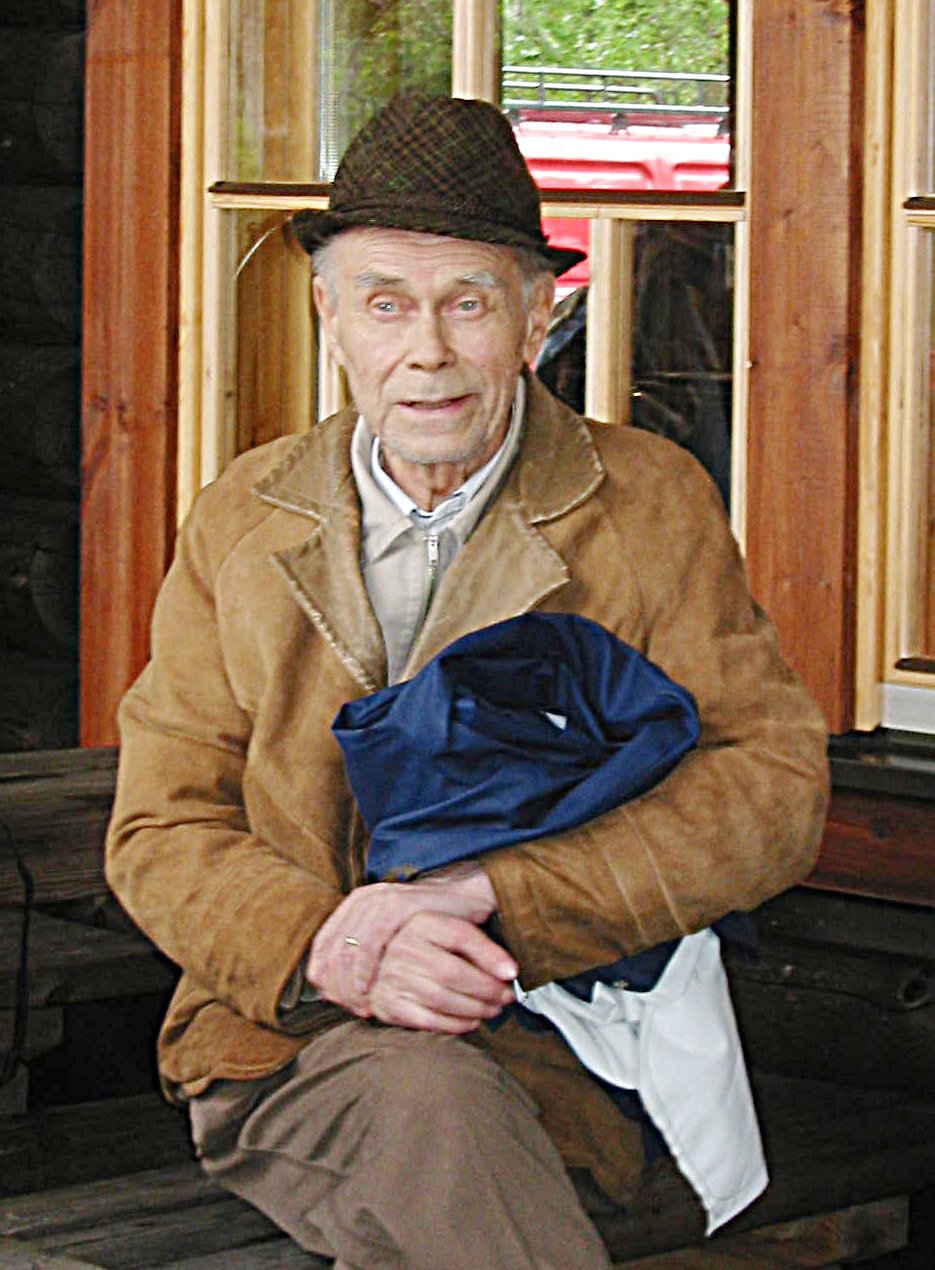
Huovinen in Kuhmo, Finland, in a press event during the photography of the film Havukka-ahon ajattelija (2009)

Veikko Huovinen (7 May 1927 – 4 October 2009) was a Finnish novelist and forester. As a novelist, his writing was known for its realism, pacifism, sharp intellect, and peculiar humor. He wrote 37 books, and one of his best-known humorous novels is The Sheep Eaters from 1970. One of his books, the 1980 novel Dog Nail Clipper was adapted into a critically well-received 2004 film of the same name.

== Early life ==
Huovinen was born in Simo, Finland. When he was six months old, his family moved to Sotkamo, where he lived until his death. As a child, Huovinen was known as well-mannered, yet he had a reputation for outlandish stories and occasional mischief. He went to high school in Kajaani, but his studies were interrupted in 1944 when he served as a volunteer AA gunner in the Finnish Army. He graduated after the war in 1946, enrolling in the University of Helsinki, from where he graduated with a M.A. in forestry in 1952.

Huovinen worked as a forester from 1953 to 1956, until becoming a full-time author. In 1999, he was awarded an honorary professorship for his services to Finnish literature. He was married and had 3 children.

== Literary career ==
Huovinen started writing in 1949 when working in a fire watch post in Vuokatti. His first short story collection, Hirri was published in 1950, followed by the novel Havukka-ahon Ajattelija in 1952. Both of these concern the life and its peculiarities in the Kainuu region in Finland, written in a unique style of humor and characterized by their inventive use of language. The main character in Havukka-ahon Ajattelija, Konsta Pylkkänen, has since become ingrained into Finnish modern folklore as the archetype of a rustic, backwoods philosopher.

Huovinen's further works never strayed far from humor, but started to exhibit the author's pacifistic philosophies and later took a turn towards black humor. A good example of such is the trilogy, referred by the author as "Three devilish mustached men"; Veitikka – A. Hitlerin elämä ja teot, Joe-setä and Pietari Suuri hatun polki, concerning Adolf Hitler, Joseph Stalin and Peter the Great respectively.

Veitikka prompted some controversy at the time, as it portrays Hitler in a humoristic light. Huovinen countered the claims of impropriety by contending that by laughing at dictators, one strips them of their power to influence people. Veitikka is ostensibly a researched study into the character of Hitler, but the totally outlandish stories quickly betray the book as a work of fiction. The two subsequent books follow the same pattern of telling a ridiculous history of the dictators while letting the author lament the effects such people have on mankind.

Huovinen's 1980 novel Koirankynnen leikkaaja (translation: Dog Nail Clipper) was adapted into a 2004 film of the same name, directed by Markku Pölönen and starred by Peter Franzén. In spite of low profits, the film was critically acclaimed receiving positive reviews and winning several major film awards. Dog Nail Clipper was the most successful film at the 2005 Jussi Awards winning in five categories including Best Film, Best Actor, and Best Direction.

== Bibliography ==
- Hirri, novelleja suurista metsistä, WSOY 1950
- Havukka-ahon ajattelija, WSOY 1952
- Ihmisten puheet, WSOY 1955
- Rauhanpiippu, WSOY 1956
- Hamsterit, WSOY 1957
- Siintävät vuoret, WSOY 1959
- Konstan Pylkkerö, WSOY 1961
- Kylän koirat, WSOY 1962
- Kuikka, WSOY 1963
- Talvituristi, WSOY 1965
- Lemmikkieläin. Fantasia ihmisistäni, WSOY 1966
- Lyhyet erikoiset, WSOY 1967
- Pohjoiset erätarinat, WSOY 1967
- Mikäpä tässä, WSOY 1969
- Tapion tarhat. Metsäpoliittista tarkastelua, Otava 1969
- Lampaansyöjät: Suomalainen reippailutarina, WSOY 1970
- Veitikka – A. Hitlerin elämä ja teot, WSOY 1971
- Rasvamaksa, WSOY 1973
- Pylkkäs Konsta mehtäämässä ja muita erätarinoita, Otava 1975
- Humusavotta. Kirjailijan päiväkirja 1974–75, Otava 1976
- Kainuun kuvia, kuvat Jorma Komulainen, Helsinki 1976
- Ronttosaurus, novelleja, Otava 1976
- Lentsu. Kertomus suomalaisten räkätaudista, Otava 1978
- Koirankynnen leikkaaja, Otava 1980
- Suomen saloilla. Kertomuksia ja perimätietoa savotoilta ja uittopurojen varsilta, Helsinki 1981
- Ympäristöministeri. Ekotarinoita, Otava 1982
- Puukansan tarina, Otava 1984
- Seitsemän sinisen takana, Otava 1986
- Matikanopettaja. Littlejuttuja eri aihelmista, Otava 1986
- Joe-setä – Aikalaisen kertomuksia Josef Stalinista, WSOY 1988
- Kasinomies Tom, Otava 1990
- Kukuskat, WSOY 1993
- Pietari Suuri hatun polki, WSOY 1995
- Porsaan paperit, eläinaiheiset erikoiset, WSOY 1999
- Sinisilmäinen ohjus, WSOY 2003
- Kolme viiksiniekkaa, mahtimiestrilogia, WSOY 2003
- Konsta Pylkkänen etsii kortteeria, WSOY 2004

Plays

- Tiikeri ja leijona, Helsingin Kansallisteatteri 1961
- Vapaita suhteita. Valitut erikoiset, WSOY 1974
- Lohkaisuja, Otava 1979
- Kootut teokset (Collected works) 1–10, WSOY 1984–86
- Pirunkalan leuat. Ajatuksia sodasta ja loistavista voitoista, WSOY 1991
- Naiset on kultia, WSOY 1996
- Viime talvi, WSOY 1998

Memoir

- Muina miehinä, WSOY 2001
