= Risto Jarva =

Finnish filmmaker

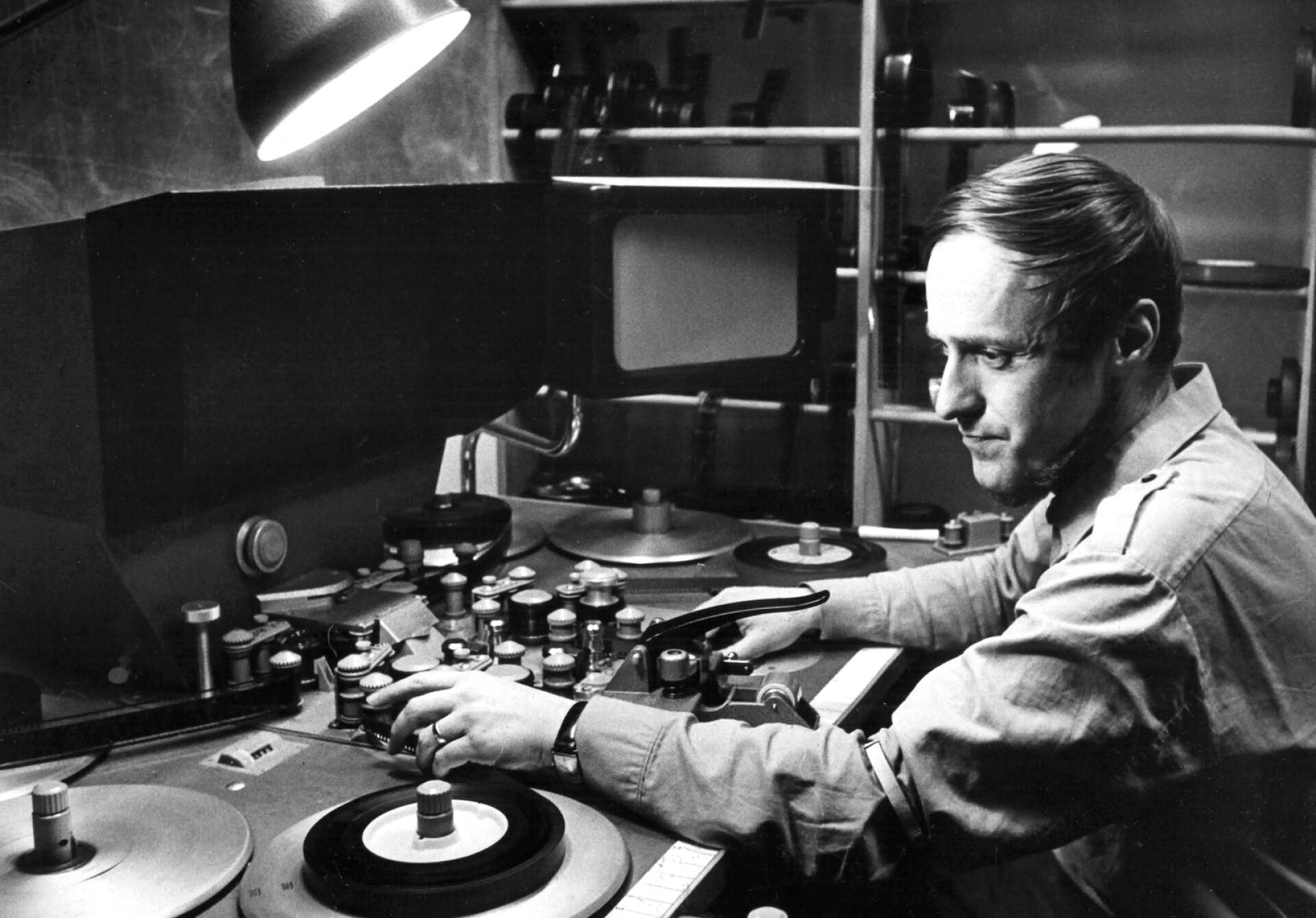
- Jarva in 1970-72
- Born: Risto Antero Jarva; 15 July 1934; Helsinki, Finland
- Died: 16 December 1977 (aged 43); Helsinki, Finland
- Education: Helsinki University of Technology
- Occupation: Filmmaker
- Years active: 1961–1977
- Notable work: X-Baron, The Diary of a Worker, Time of Roses, The Year of the Hare

Risto Antero Jarva (15 July 1934 – 16 December 1977) was a Finnish filmmaker.

== Career ==
Jarva usually approached his long films and short documentary films from some social problem and from one or more possible ways to solve it. Such problems included the widespread use of cars, the position of women, city planning, pollution, the role of gossip magazines' journalists, and the Finnish society's remaining ideological divides.

His 1967 film The Diary of a Worker was entered into the 5th Moscow International Film Festival.

He was a seven time Jussi Awards winner.

Jarva worked as an artistic professor of the film from 1970 to 1975 and as the Helsinki Applied Arts and Industry College's senior teacher from 1975 to 1977. His last film was Jäniksen vuosi ("The Year of the Hare"). He died in a car accident on his way back from a private showing of the film and the subsequent party.
