= Ilmari Saarelainen =

Finnish actor

- Born: 12 September 1944 (age 80); Uusikaupunki, Finland

Ilmari Saarelainen (born 12 September 1944 in Uusikaupunki) is a Finnish actor. His career has been mainly based on television.

Saarelainen began acting in 1970 appearing in a number of TV series. His career has mainly been based on Finnish television although in the early to mid-1980s he starred in a number of Finnish films most famously as the bumbling lead character in the 1983 James Bond spoof Agent 000 and the Deadly Curves.

== See also ==
- Tankki täyteen
