= Tenho Saurén =

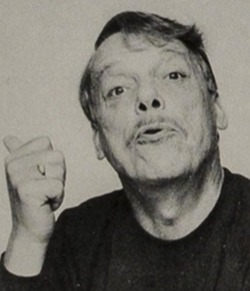
- Tenho Saurén 1980's
- Born: 1 September 1926; Viiala, Finland
- Died: 21 March 2001 (aged 74); Tampere, Finland

Tenho Saurén (1 September 1926, Viiala, now a part of Akaa - 21 March 2001 Tampere, Finland) was a Finnish actor and comic.

He appeared on Finnish television several times in the 1970s and early 1980s always in comedy roles. He starred as the police officer Reinikainen in the TV series of the same name, a spin-off of Tankki täyteen. He retired from acting in 1983 and compiled a number of comic audio cassettes and joke books in the 1980s. He died in 2001.

He was married to Kaarina Kallionpää until his death.
