= List of Finnish films of the 1980s =

A list of films produced in Finland ordered by year of release. For an alphabetical list of Finnish films see Category:Finnish films

Title	Director	Cast	Genre	Notes
1980
Borrowing Matchsticks	Leonid Gaidai, Risto Orko	Yevgeny Leonov, Vyacheslav Nevinny, Georgy Vitsin, Rita Polster	Comedy	
Flame Top	Pirjo Honkasalo, Pekka Lehto	Asko Sarkola, Rea Mauranen, Kari Franck	Drama	Entered into the 1981 Cannes Film Festival
Milka – A Film About Taboos	Rauni Mollberg	Irma Huntus, Leena Suomu, Matti Turunen	Drama	Entered into the 31st Berlin International Film Festival
The Raven's Dance	Markku Lehmuskallio	Pertti Kalinainen, Paavo Katajasaari, Hilkka Matikainen	Drama	Entered into the 30th Berlin International Film Festival
The Solar Wind	Timo Linnasalo	Paavo Piskonen, Lilga Kovanko, Antti Litja	Science fiction drama film	
1981
The Liar	Mika Kaurismäki	Aki Kaurismäki, Pirkko Hämäläinen	Comedy	
Night by the Seashore	Erkko Kivikoski	Pertti Palo, Sirkku Grahn, Pauli Virtanen	Drama	Entered into the 12th Moscow International Film Festival
Pölhölä	Taavi Kassila, Heikki Kinnunen	Heikki Kinnunen, Aake Kalliala	Comedy	IMDb
The Saimaa Gesture	Aki Kaurismäki, Mika Kaurismäki	Juice Leskinen, Martti Syrjä, Ismo Alanko	Documentary	
Sign of the Beast	Jaakko Pakkasvirta	Esko Salminen, Irina Milan, Tom Wentzel	Drama	
That Kiljunen Family	Matti Kuortti	Jukka Sipilä, Marja-Sisko Aimonen	Family	IMDb
Uuno Turhapuron aviokriisi	Ere Kokkonen	Vesa-Matti Loiri, Marjatta Raita, Tapio Hämäläinen	Comedy	IMDb
1982
Aidankaatajat eli heidän jälkeensä vedenpaisumus	Olli Soinio	Erkki Pajala	Comedy drama	Music was performed by Asser Fagerström
The Archer	Taavi Kassila	Kari Heiskanen, Åke Lindman, Eeva Eloranta	Drama	
The Worthless	Mika Kaurismäki	Matti Pellonpää, Pirkko Hämäläinen, Juuso Hirvikangas	Drama	
Uuno Turhapuro menettää muistinsa	Ere Kokkonen	Vesa-Matti Loiri, Marjatta Raita, Spede Pasanen, Simo Salminen	Comedy	IMDb
1983
Agent 000 and the Deadly Curves	Visa Mäkinen	Ilmari Saarelainen, Tenho Saurén	Parody	
Jon	Jaakko Pyhälä	Kari Väänänen, Vesa-Matti Loiri	Drama	Entered into the 13th Moscow International Film Festival
Uuno Turhapuron muisti palailee pätkittäin	Ere Kokkonen	Vesa-Matti Loiri, Marjatta Raita, Spede Pasanen, Simo Salminen	Comedy	IMDb
1984
Aikalainen	Timo Linnasalo	Anita Heikkinen, Pekka Laiho, Kati Outinen	Drama	
The Clan – Tale of the Frogs	Mika Kaurismäki	Markku Halme, Minna Soisalo, Sakari Rouvinen	Drama	Entered into the 14th Moscow International Film Festival
Pessi and Illusia	Heikki Partanen	Eija Ahvo, Riitta-Anneli Forss, Raimo Grönberg	Fantasy	
Sista leken	Jon Lindström	Sven Wollter, Karolina Korpioja, Aino Seppo	Drama	
Uuno Turhapuro armeijan leivissä	Ere Kokkonen	Vesa-Matti Loiri	Comedy	
Hunters of the Night	Visa Mäkinen	Ilmari Saarelainen, Kauko Helovirta, Matti Mäntylä	Action thriller	
1985
Calamari Union	Aki Kaurismäki	Timo Eränkö	Comedy/ Satire	Cult favorite
Da Capo	Pirjo Honkasalo, Pekka Lehto	Raimo Karppinen, Tarmo Manni, Rea Mauranen	Biographical drama	
The Unknown Soldier (Tuntematon sotilas)	Rauni Mollberg	Risto Tuorila, Pirkka-Pekka Petelius	War drama	3 wins and screened at the 1986 Cannes Film Festival
Uuno Epsanjassa (Uuno in Spain)	Ere Kokkonen	Vesa-Matti Loiri	Comedy	
1986
Born American	Renny Harlin	Mike Norris, Steve Durham, David Coburn	Action	
Flight North	Ingemo Engström	Katharina Thalbach, Jukka-Pekka Palo, Lena Olin	Drama	Entered into the 36th Berlin International Film Festival
Shadows in Paradise	Aki Kaurismäki			
The Snow Queen	Päivi Hartzell	Satu Silvo, Outi Vainionkulma, Sebastian Kaatrasalo	Fantasy	
Pekka Puupää poliisina	Visa Mäkinen	Esko Roine	Comedy	2nd tribute to 1950s series -
Valkoinen kääpiö	Timo Humaloja	Kari Heiskanen, Jaana Raski	Drama	
V.Y. Vihdoinkin yhdessä	Kari Kyrönseppä	Pirkka-Pekka Petelius, Sarianna Salminen	Comedy, musical	IMDb
1987
Hamlet liikemaailmassa	Aki Kaurismäki	Pirkka-Pekka Petelius, Esko Salminen	Comedy	IMDb
Helsinki Napoli All Night Long	Mika Kaurismäki	Kari Väänänen, Nino Manfredi, Eddie Constantine	Comedy	
Tropic of Ice (Jään kääntöpiiri)	Lauri Törhönen	Peter Abbott, Mats Dumell	Spy film	
Uuno Turhapuro – kaksoisagentti	Spede Pasanen	Vesa-Matti Loiri	Comedy	
Älä itke Iines	Janne Kuusi	Eija Vilpas		IMDb
1988
Ariel	Aki Kaurismäki	Turo Pajala, Susanna Haavisto	Comedy drama	Entered into the 16th Moscow International Film Festival
The Glory and Misery of Human Life	Matti Kassila	Lasse Pöysti, Liisamaija Laaksonen, Tuula Nyman	Drama	
Katsastus	Matti Ijäs	Vesa Vierikko, Sulevi Peltola	Comedy	
Kuutamosonaatti	Olli Soinio	Tiina Björkman	Horror	
Tupla-Uuno (Double Uuno)	Hannu Seikkula	Vesa-Matti Loiri, Marjatta Raita, Tapio Hämäläinen	Comedy	IMDb
"Onks' Viljoo näkyny?" ("Has anyone seen Viljo?")	Hannu Seikkula	Heikki Kinnunen, Aake Kalliala, Pirkka-Pekka Petelius	Comedy	IMDb
1989
Homebound	Ilkka Järvi-Laturi	Ilkka Koivula, Jonna Järnefelt	Crime drama	
Leningrad Cowboys Go America	Aki Kaurismäki	Matti Pellonpää, Kari Väänänen	Drama	
The Winter War	Pekka Parikka	Taneli Mäkelä, Vesa Vierikko, Timo Torikka	War drama	Entered into the 40th Berlin International Film Festival
