= Uuno Turhapuro – Suomen tasavallan herra presidentti =

- DVD cover
- Directed by: Ere Kokkonen
- Written by: Ere Kokkonen
- Produced by: Spede Pasanen
- Starring: Vesa-Matti Loiri; Tapio Hämäläinen; Marjatta Raita; Marita Nordberg
- Distributed by: Spede-Studio Oy
- Release date: 1992
- Running time: 1h 25 min
- Language: Finnish
- Budget: FIM9,000

Uuno Turhapuro – Suomen tasavallan herra presidentti is a 1992 Finnish comedy film written and directed by Ere Kokkonen. It is the sixteenth film in the Uuno Turhapuro series. Its name translates to "Uuno Turhapuro – the Mister President [sic] of the Republic of Finland".

The film got mediocre reviews compared to the other Turhapuro films. It also had a small audience and profited only 9,000 FIM.

== Plot ==
Uuno Turhapuro has become the new President of Finland. As President, Uuno decrees that all of the cabinet ministers should wear happy face masks, and appoints his own father along with Härski Hartikainen, Sörsselssön and other people from his home village to the government.

There is a news report that the Royal Couple of Sweden are going on a state visit to Norway, which makes Uuno realise that Finland is not a monarchy unlike the rest of the Nordic countries. This mistake can only be remedied by making Finland into a kingdom.

As Uuno knows Sörsselssön can speak Swedish, he asks him to telephone the Swedish Royal Couple to invite them to Finland, so Uuno can learn from them the ways of the royals.

Uuno suggests to king Carl XVI Gustaf of Sweden that they swap wives, which the king thinks is a good idea. The citizens of Finland support changing Finland to a monarchy and renaming streets and shopping centres after Uuno, and he gets awarded a statue.

Just as Finland is on its way to becoming a monarchy, Uuno's doctor tells him he should take leave of his post for a while. Uuno asks former President of Finland Mauno Koivisto to resume his post as president, because Uuno has found out the busy life of a king just isn't suitable for him after all.

== Cast ==
| Role | Actor |
|---|---|
| Vesa-Matti Loiri | Uuno Turhapuro |
| Tapio Hämäläinen | councilor Valtter Tuura |
| Marjatta Raita | Elisabeth Turhapuro |
| [Marita Nordberg | Mrs. Tuura |
| Simo Salminen | Sörsselssön |
| Spede Pasanen | Härski-Hartikainen |
| Hannele Lauri | reporter |
| Matti Tuominen | councilor |
| Ismo Kallio | former President of Finland Mauno Koivisto |
| Olavi Ahonen | father of Uuno Turhapuro |
| Marja Korhonen | wife of teacher |
| Helge Herala | teacher Happonen |
| Elli Castrén | secretary of Tuura |
| Leo Lastumäki | policeman Viinikainen |
| Aarre Karén | personal physician of the president |
| Aarno Sulkanen | councilor |
| Aake Kalliala | man shoving money into holes |
| Tom Pöysti | policeman at the "Miss Street Girl" contest |
| Seppo Pääkkönen | policeman in front of the Presidential Palace |
| Jörn Donner | himself as author of the documentary about Uuno |
| Ben Zyskowicz | chairman refusing a Walpurgis Night nose |
| Hilkka Ahde | Queen Silvia of Sweden |
| Jussi Lepistö | king Carl XVI Gustaf of Sweden |
| Pekka Oksala | TV reporter |
| Leif Salmén | TV reporter |
| Leena Kaskela | news anchor |
| Riitta Väisänen | judge at a look-alike contest |
| Anna-Kaisa Hermunen | TV reporter |
| Anja Snellman | herself as owner of a café at the market square |
| Pia Nolvi | secretary |
| Teija Kurhi | secretary |
| Kristiina Telenius | secretary of president |
| Arlene Kotala | secretary of president |
| Sari Salonen | secretary of president |
| Marika Savolainen | secretary of president |
| Karita Hallaperä | secretary of president |
| Marjaana Manninen | secretary of president |
| Guards Band | themselves as a military band |
| Pauli Salminen]] | father of a family being photographed |
| Jukka Puotila | voice of Jörn Donner at the Uuno documentary |
| Raine Ampuja]] | conductor of the Guards Band |
| Kari Helaseppä | look-alike of Uuno Turhapuro |
| Saija Hakola | woman playing a slots machine / Sesse in the film Uuno Turhapuro - kaksoisagentti |
| Sasu Tuominen | man playing a slots machine |
| Trasseli Partanen | man playing a slots machine |
| Pekka Lampela | artist |
| Tessu | itself as Tessu the dog |
| Helena Holopainen | actress in the film Lottovoittaja UKK Turhapuro |
| Jukka Virtanen | Uuno's cabin neighbour in the film Lottovoittaja UKK Turhapuro |
| Ere Kokkonen | voice of priest in the film Uuno Turhapuro - kaksoisagentti |
| Lahti city orchestra | orchestra in the film Uuno Turhapuro - kaksoisagentti |
| Seppo Laine | Tossavainen in the film Lottovoittaja UKK Turhapuro |
| Jarkko Rantanen | second lieutenant Naapero in the film Uuno Turhapuro armeijan leivissä |
| Johanna Rautio | Reetta in the film Uuno Turhapuro muuttaa maalle |
| Satu Silvo | Rosita in the film Uuno Epsanjassa |
| Juhani Kumpulainen | Ilpo in the film Uuno Turhapuro armeijan leivissä |
| Jyrki Kovaleff | captain in the film Uuno Turhapuro armeijan leivissä |
| Anna-Liisa Ruotsi | Uuno's cabin neighbour in the film Uuno Turhapuro |
| Eila Pehkonen | actress in the film Uunon huikeat oikeat poikamiesvuodet |
| Liisa Paatso | Unelma in the film Rautakauppias Uuno Turhapuro - presidentin vävy |
| Tuula Polvi | Tisse in the film Uuno Turhapuro - kaksoisagentti |
| Yrjö Parjanne | colonel in the film Uuno Turhapuro armeijan leivissä |
| Pirkka-Pekka Petelius | Tarmo Tömisevä in the film Uuno Turhapuro herra Helsingin herra |
| Raija Salmela | actress in the film Lottovoittaja UKK Turhapuro |
| Honorary company of the Guards Battalion | honorary company |
