= Elisabeth Turhapuro =

- First appearance: Uuno Turhapuro (1973)
- Last appearance: Uuno Turhapuro - This Is My Life
- Created by: Spede Pasanen
- Portrayed by: Marjatta Raita

In-universe information
- Gender: Female
- Spouse: Uuno Turhapuro
- Relatives: father Councillor Tuura mother Reetta Tuura

Elisabeth Unelma Turhapuro (née Tuura) is a fictional character played by Marjatta Raita in Finnish comedy films, the Uuno Turhapuro series, directed by Spede Pasanen and Ere Kokkonen. She is part of the cast who appear in all Uuno Turhapuro films and TV series. The exception being Uuno Turhapuron veli, where the main character Uuno Turhapuro played by Vesa-Matti Loiri did not appear. Uuno debuted in 1973 in a sketch on the Spede Show, as half of a still nameless couple who had a premature argument about how to use their lottery money. (This sketch was recycled in the film Rautakauppias Uuno Turhapuro - presidentin vävy.)

Elisabeth Turhapuro is only daughter of Councillor Tuura, the richest man in Finland, and the sharp, fiery and snapping wife of Uuno who has no sense of humor and often gets into arguments with him.

== Marriage ==
As soon as Uuno and Elizabeth were married their marriage ran into trouble. However, although Elisabeth has, in many of her films, threatened her husband with divorce, she has always forgiven him his flaws and defects and the couple has remained married. Her husband, Uuno, believes that she is "withered", and will flirt with other women, which is often the reason for their marital disputes.

The real reason Uuno married Elizabeth is because her father, Councillor Tuura, is the richest man in Finland and Uuno wants to inherit his wealth when he dies.

Marjatta Raita speculated in an interview that the reason why Uuno and Elisabeth stay together has to do with what happens in the bedroom. Elisabeth can sometimes be very violent when upset with Uuno who usually brushes her remarks with an odd explanation which most of the time, in its own odd way, makes sense, leading Elisabeth baffled and unmotivated to continue the argument.

== Filmography of character ==
- Professori Uuno D.G. Turhapuro (1975)
- Lottovoittaja UKK Turhapuro (1976)
- Häpy Endkö? Eli kuinka Uuno Turhapuro sai niin kauniin ja rikkaan vaimon (1977)
- Rautakauppias Uuno Turhapuro - presidentin vävy (1978)
- Uuno Turhapuron aviokriisi (1981)
- Uuno Turhapuro menettää muistinsa (1982)
- Uuno Turhapuron muisti palailee pätkittäin (1983)
- Uuno Turhapuro armeijan leivissä (1984)
- Uuno Epsanjassa (1985)
- Uuno Turhapuro muuttaa maalle (1986)
- Uuno Turhapuro - kaksoisagentti (1987)
- Tupla-Uuno (1988)
- Uunon huikeat poikamiesvuodet maaseudulla (1990)
- Uuno Turhapuro - herra Helsingin herra (1991)
- Uuno Turhapuro - Suomen tasavallan herra presidentti (1992)
- Uuno Turhapuron poika (1993)
- Uuno Turhapuron veli (1994)
- Johtaja Uuno Turhapuro - pisnismies (1998)
- Uuno Turhapuro - This Is My Life (2004)

TV-series:

- Uuno Turhapuro armeijan leivissä (1986) (The film as enlarged TV-series with 7 episodes)
- Uuno Turhapuro (1996)
- Johtaja Uuno Turhapuro - pisnismies (1998) (The film as enlarged TV-series with 5 episodes)
- Uuno Turhapuro - This Is My Life (2006) (The film as enlarged TV-series with 6 episodes)
