= Juhani Kumpulainen =

Finnish actor and director (1925–1991)

- Born: 31 July 1925; Viipuri, Finland
- Died: 12 November 1991 (aged 66); Helsinki, Finland

Juhani "Juhku" Kumpulainen (31 July 1925, in Viipuri – 12 November 1991, in Helsinki) was a Finnish actor and director. He did a total of 85 movie roles between 1950 and 1991. Kumpulainen was also the official YLE's administrative and organizational tasks as well as Tesvisio facility manager.

== Career ==
His first film role was in the year 1950 in the film Maija löytää sävelen (Finnish: Maija Finds a Tone). Kumpulainen became known for his role in the 1950s in the Pekka ja Pätkä movies, (Finnish: Pekka and Pätkä), where he did minor roles. He also appeared in many soldier farces in 1950s and 1960s.

Juhani Kumpulainen was remembered best as a long-standing credit actor of Spede Pasanen and Ere Kokkonen. Kumpulainen appeared in separate films from 1960s until his death. In the Uuno Turhapuro films he played the leader of garage and Uuno's neighbor Kotkala-Hammaslärvänen.

Kumpulainen was one of the mostly performed minor roles in the 1950s, because he did a total of 45 film roles in the 1950s.

== Personal life ==
Kumpulainen was married to actress-director Mirjam Kumpulainen. Juhani Kumpulainen died on 12 November 1991 at the age of 66 years. His last role was a lieutenant-colonel Mäkihakola-Kustaaraivio in the movie Vääpeli Körmy ja vetenalaiset vehkeet directed by Ere Kokkonen. Kumpulainen appeared also in movies Here, Beneath the North Star, Akseli and Elina and Pohjantähti, playing a saw owner A. Mellola.

== Filmography ==
- Maija löytää sävelen (1950)
- Neljä rakkautta (1951)
- Radio tekee murron (1951)
- Yö on pitkä (1952)
- Tervetuloa aamukahville (1952)
- Hilja maitotyttö (1953)
- Kolmiapila (1953)
- Pekka Puupää kesälaitumilla (1953)
- Pekka ja Pätkä lumimiehen jäljillä (1954)
- Olemme kaikki syyllisiä (1954)
- Herrojen Eev] (1954)
- Morsiusseppele (1954)
- Hei, rillumarei (1954)
- Kovanaama (1954)
- Mä oksalla ylimmällä (1954)
- Minä soitan sinulle illalla (1954)
- Sininen viikko (1954)
- Veteraanin voitto (1955)
- Tähtisilmä (1955)
- Pekka ja Pätkä pahassa pulassa (1955)
- Sankarialokas (1955)
- Pastori Jussilainen (1955)
- Neiti talonmies (1955)
- Viettelysten tie (1955)
- Rakkaus kahleissa (1955)
- Onni etsii asuntoa (1955)
- Tyttö tuli taloon (1956)
- Tyttö lähtee kasarmiin (1956)
- Jokin ihmisessä (1956)
- Yhteinen vaimomme (1956)
- Rakas varkaani (1957)
- Herra sotaministeri (1957)
- Pekka ja Pätkä ketjukolarissa (1957)
- Pekka ja Pätkä salapoliiseina (1957)
- Pekka ja Pätkä sammakkomiehinä (1957)
- 1918 – mies ja hänen omatuntonsa (1957)
- Risti ja liekki (1957)
- Pikku Ilona ja hänen karitsansa (1957)
- Paksunahka (1958)
- Autuas eversti (1958)
- Asessorin naishuolet (1958)
- Pekka ja Pätkä Suezilla (1958)
- Pekka ja Pätkä miljonääreinä (1958)
- Kohtalo tekee siirron (1959)
- Pekka ja Pätkä mestarimaalareina (1959)
- Juokse kuin varas! (1964)
- Millipilleri (1966)
- Rakkaus alkaa aamuyöstä (1966)
- Täällä Pohjantähden alla (1968)
- Äl' yli päästä perhanaa (1968)
- Noin 7 veljestä (1968)
- Sixtynine 69 (1969)
- Leikkikalugangsteri (1969)
- Näköradiomiehen ihmeelliset siekailut (1969)
- Speedy Gonzales – noin 7 veljeksen poika (1970)
- Akseli and Elina (1970)
- Naisenkuvia (1970)
- Kahdeksas veljes (1971)
- Pohjantähti (1973)
- Uuno Turhapuro (1973)
- Viu-hah hah-taja (1974)
- Professori Uuno D.G. Turhapuro (1975)
- Lottovoittaja UKK Turhapuro (1976)
- Häpy Endkö? Eli kuinka Uuno Turhapuro sai niin kauniin ja rikkaan vaimon (1977)
- Rautakauppias Uuno Turhapuro – presidentin vävy (1978)
- Runoilija ja muusa (1978)
- Tup-akka-lakko (1980)
- Uuno Turhapuron aviokriisi (1981)
- Uuno Turhapuro menettää muistinsa (1982)
- Havis Amanda – Helsingin kaunotar (1982)
- Uuno Turhapuron muisti palailee pätkittäin (1983)
- Huhtikuu on kuukausista julmin (1983)
- Uuno Turhapuro armeijan leivissä (1984)
- Hei kliffaa hei (1985)
- Uuno Epsanjassa (1985)
- Linna (1986)
- Uuno Turhapuro muuttaa maalle (1986)
- Pikkupojat (1986)
- Liian iso keikka (1986)
- Uuno Turhapuro – kaksoisagentti (1987)
- Tupla-Uuno (1988)
- Vääpeli Körmy ja marsalkan sauva (1990)
- Uuno Turhapuro herra Helsingin herra (1991)
- Vääpeli Körmy ja vetenalaiset vehkeet (1991)
