= Ville-Veikko Salminen =

Finnish actor and director (1937–2006)

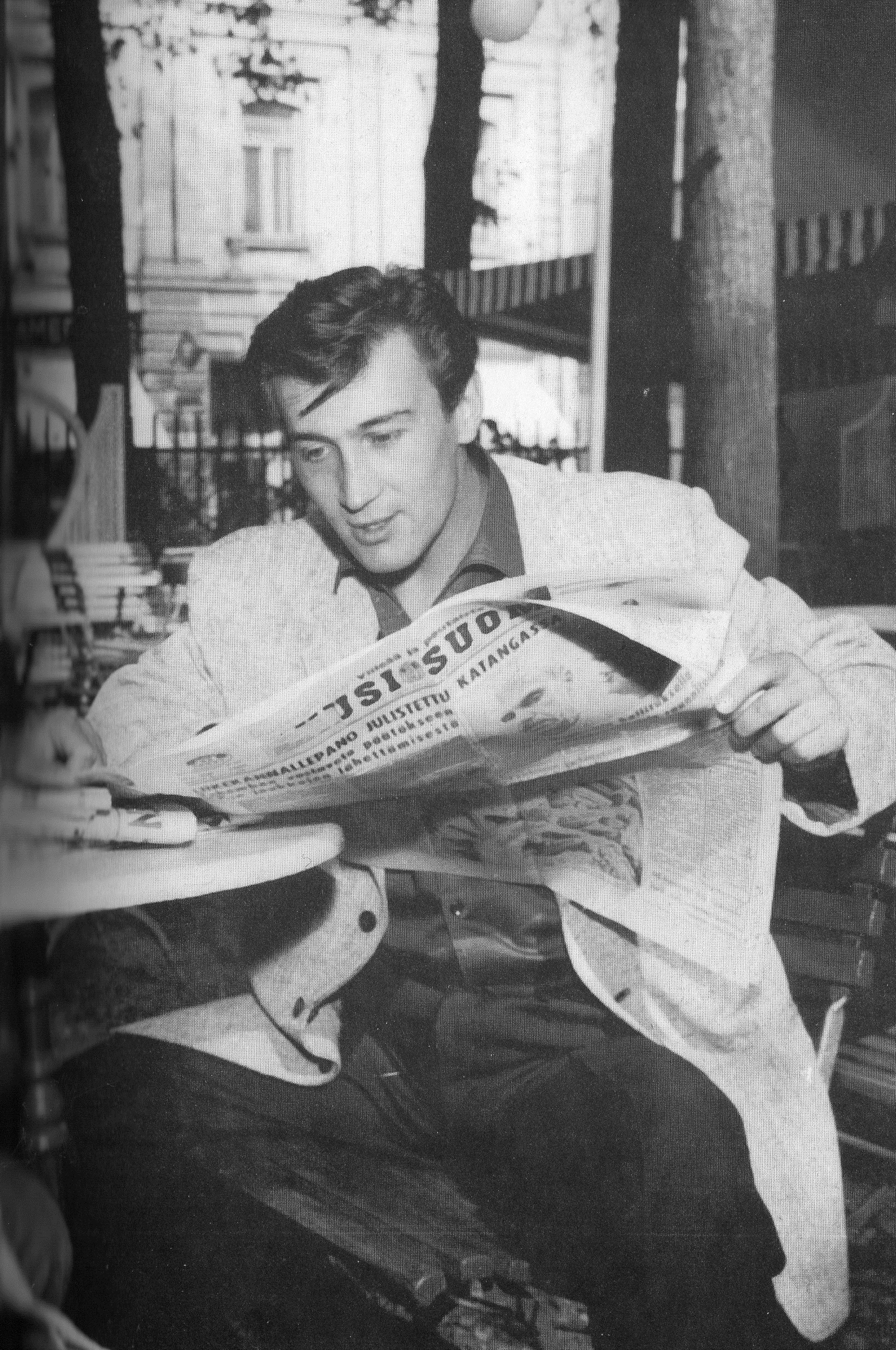
- Ville-Veikko Salminen in 1960.
- Born: 23 August 1937; Turku, Finland
- Died: 16 January 2006 (aged 68); Helsinki, Finland
- Years active: 1948 - 2004
- Spouse(s): Laila Kinnunen (1967–1970); Ulla Salminen (1988-2006) (his death)

Ville-Veikko Salminen (23 August 1937, Turku - 16 January 2006) was a Finnish film, television, stage actor and director. He was one of the founders of the acting companies for both Yleisradio and Mainostelevisio. He is best remembered for his roles in the films of Spede Pasanen, often playing a handsome, suave womanizer - but also had an extensive career in films and TV outside his films.

== Personal life ==
Salminen was the son of famed Finnish filmmaker Ville Salminen and brother of cinematographer Timo Salminen. Salminen was briefly married to Laila Kinnunen, one of the most famous Finnish singers of the 1950s and 1960s. Their daughter is Milana Misic.

== Filmography ==
=== Actor ===
- Irmeli, Seitsemäntoista vuotias (1948) - Erkki Svanberg (debut)
- Laivaston monnit maissa (1954) - Vakoojia
- Laivan kannella (1954) - Ship-boy
- Säkkijärven polkka (1955) - Kylänpoika Ollilasta
- Helunan häämatka (1955) - Ville - stoker
- Viettelysten tie (1955) - Ville
- Tyttö lähtee kasarmiin (1956) - Alokas
- Evakko (1956) - Nuori Vänrikki
- Nuori mylläri (1958) - Jussi Salminen
- Sotapojan heilat (1958) - Alikersantti #2
- Ei ruumiita makuuhuoneeseen (1959) - Lentoperämies (uncredited)
- Yks' tavallinen Virtanen (1959) - Autonkuljettaja
- Taas tapaamme Suomisen perheen (1959) - Nuori mies (uncredited)
- Oho, sanoi Eemeli (1960) - Ville
- Nina ja Erik (1960) - Heikki Korte
- Kaks' tavallista Lahtista (1960) - European champion
- Autotytöt (1960) - Sailor
- Molskis, sanoi Eemeli, molskis! (1960) - Kari
- Mullin mallin (1961) - Ville
- Vaarallista vapautta (1962) - Kari
- Jengi (1963) - Kalle
- Telefon (1977) - Russian Steward
- Likainen puolitusina (1982) - Erik Lungholm
- Kuutamosonaatti (1988) - Carli
- Hurmaava joukkoitsemurha (2000) - Ermei Rankkala

=== Actor in Spede Pasanen films ===
- Harha-askel (1964)
- Kielletty kirja (1965) - Jukka Johan Kilpi
- Pohjan tähteet (1969) - Igor Lötjönen
- Speedy Gonzales - noin 7 veljeksen poika (1970) - Bat Masterson
- Saatanan Radikaalit (1971) - Vaatekaupan myyjä (uncredited)
- Viu-hah hah-taja (1974) - Jaska
- Tup-akka-lakko (1980) - Pääministerin sihteeri
- Uuno Turhapuron aviokriisi (1981) - Vetoa lyövä mies
- Uuno Turhapuro menettää muistinsa (1982) - Lääkäri
- Uuno Turhapuron muisti palailee pätkittäin (1983) - Lääkäri
- Uuno Turhapuro armeijan leivissä (1984) - Head-Waiter
- Uuno Epsanjassa (1985) - José
- Liian Iso Keikka (1986) - Nigolai Savtsenko
- Uuno Turhapuro – kaksoisagentti (1987) - Mies konserttitalolla
- Uuno Turhapuro - This is my life (2004) - Näyttelijä (final role)

=== As director ===
- Sirkka ja Sakari (1976, TV Series)
- Sämpy (1979, TV Series)
- Olet vain kahdesti nuori (1980-1982, TV Series)
