= Councillor Tuura =

- Councillor Tuura played by Tapio Hämäläinen in the 1987 film Uuno Turhapuro – kaksoisagentti.
- First appearance: Professori Uuno D.G. Turhapuro
- Last appearance: Uuno Turhapuro - This Is My Life
- Created by: Spede Pasanen
- Portrayed by: Tapio Hämäläinen

In-universe information
- Gender: Male
- Occupation: councillor, politician
- Relatives: mrs. Reetta Tuura daughter Elisabeth Turhapuro son-in-law Uuno Turhapuro

Councillor Tuura is a fictional character in the Finnish comedy film series Uuno Turhapuro. He is the father of Uuno's wife Elisabeth Turhapuro (née Tuura), Uuno's father-in-law and married with Reetta Tuura, Elisabeth's mother. Uuno wrings when he speaking the official title of Councillor Tuura, vuorineuvos to vuoristoneuvos. He is chief executive officer of the Tuura Company. Councillor Tuura has many first names during the film series: Voldemar, Karolus, Taneli, Elmeri, Valtter and Hugo. His secretary is Miss Unelma Säleikkö.

Councillor Tuura can't stand his son-in-law Uuno; because of him he has become a nervous wreck. He has called that for example "garbage face" and "heap of rubbish". In the beginning of every Uuno film he moves around in his private office keep telling: "I feel as if this is happiest day in my lifetime." Then he hears about the newest coup of Uuno in phone, radio, television or newspaper. The day is irrevocably spoilt.

Tuura doesn't make an appearance in the first Uuno film Uuno Turhapuro (1973) because he was not fabricated yet. Pehr-Olof Sirén played a character in the second Uuno film Professori Uuno D.G. Turhapuro (1975), where he was called "Elisabeth's father". Tapio Hämäläinen played Tuura in all other Uuno films as well as a TV series from 1996 except for film Johtaja Uuno Turhapuro - pisnismies (1998). Tapio Hämäläinen was tired of Tuura's role in the 1990s after shooting films for five years followed by a 23-episode television series. He claimed for his role performance greater reward than usually, which no one agreed. Heikki Nousiainen replaced him.

Councillor Tuura has acted as presidential candidate and served as The Finnish foreign minister and prime minister.

== First names ==
- Voldemar (1976 in film Lottovoittaja UKK Turhapuro)
- Karolus (1977 in film Häpy Endkö? Eli kuinka Uuno Turhapuro sai niin kauniin ja rikkaan vaimon)
- Jalmari (1981 in film Uuno Turhapuron aviokriisi)
- Elmeri (1982 in film Uuno Turhapuro menettää muistinsa)
- A. (1983 in film Uuno Turhapuron muisti palailee pätkittäin)
- Taneli (1988 in film Tupla-Uuno)
- Valtter (1992 in film Uuno Turhapuro – Suomen tasavallan herra presidentti)
- Hugo (in films Uuno Turhapuron poika (1993) and Johtaja Uuno Turhapuro – pisnismies (1998) as well as in TV-series Uuno Turhapuro (1996)
- Mark Tuura 'Uulo Tuura'

== Political career ==
- President candidate 1978 (election campaign fails because of Uuno)
- Defence minister 1984 (proclaims inadvertently the war versus Sweden and ends up in to the court-martial)
- Prime minister 1992 (Uuno appoints Tuura as prime minister after himself had become to the president of Finland)

== Actors ==
- Pehr-Olof Sirén (with name Elisabeth's father in film Professori Uuno D.G. Turhapuro 1975)
- Tapio Hämäläinen (in all films 1976–1994, 2004 and in year 1996 in TV-series)
- Heikki Nousiainen (in film Johtaja Uuno Turhapuro – pisnismies 1998)

== Filmography ==
- Professori Uuno D.G. Turhapuro (1975)
- Lottovoittaja UKK Turhapuro (1976)
- Häpy Endkö? Eli kuinka Uuno Turhapuro sai niin kauniin ja rikkaan vaimon (1977)
- Rautakauppias Uuno Turhapuro - presidentin vävy (1978)
- Uuno Turhapuron aviokriisi (1981)
- Uuno Turhapuro menettää muistinsa (1982)
- Uuno Turhapuron muisti palailee pätkittäin (1983)
- Uuno Turhapuro armeijan leivissä (1984)
- Uuno Epsanjassa (1985)
- Uuno Turhapuro muuttaa maalle (1986)
- Uuno Turhapuro - kaksoisagentti (1987)
- Tupla-Uuno (1988)
- Uunon huikeat poikamiesvuodet maaseudulla (1990)
- Uuno Turhapuro - herra Helsingin herra (1991)
- Uuno Turhapuro - Suomen tasavallan herra presidentti (1992)
- Uuno Turhapuron poika (1993)
- Uuno Turhapuron veli (1994)
- Johtaja Uuno Turhapuro - pisnismies (1998)
- Uuno Turhapuro - This Is My Life (2004)
- Mark Tuura (2000)

TV-series:

- Uuno Turhapuro armeijan leivissä (1986) (The film as enlarged TV-series with 7 episodes)
- Uuno Turhapuro (1996)
- Johtaja Uuno Turhapuro - pisnismies (1998) (The film as enlarged TV-series with 5 episodes)
- Uuno Turhapuro - This Is My Life (2006) (The film as enlarged TV-series with 6 episodes)
