= Uuno Turhapuro muuttaa maalle =

- DVD cover of Uuno Turhapuro muuttaa maalle.
- Directed by: Ere Kokkonen
- Written by: Ere Kokkonen
- Produced by: Spede Pasanen
- Starring: Vesa-Matti Loiri; Marjatta Raita; Tapio Hämäläinen; Olavi Ahonen
- Distributed by: Filmituotanto Spede Pasanen Ky
- Release date: 1986
- Running time: 1h 45min
- Language: Finnish

Uuno Turhapuro muuttaa maalle ("Uuno Turhapuro moves to the country") is a 1986 Finnish comedy film, the 11th film in the Uuno Turhapuro film series.

The film attracted a total of 556,519 viewers. It is the fourth most successful Uuno Turhapuro films. It was filmed in twenty days, from 22 May to 17 June 1986. The countryside scenes were filmed in Heinola, around the Viikinäinen vacation resort. The scene where Tuura visits a psychiatrist was filmed in Spede Pasanen's office in the MTV studios.

The film shows Spede's invention's "alarm clock", "cross between a Mercedes-Benz and a Volkswagen Beetle", and "boiling machine", which were previously shown in Spede's films X-Paroni and Pähkähullu Suomi. The other inventions were designed by Ere Kokkonen.

The film also includes an appearance by Member of the Parliament and Minister Paavo Väyrynen, who recites Runeberg's poem Maaherra wearing a traditional Finnish national costume.

A computer game called Uuno Turhapuro muuttaa maalle was made for the Commodore 64, based on the film. The game was developed by Pasi Hytönen and published by AmerSoft, part of the Amer group. It is probably the first licensed video game based on a Finnish film.

== Cast ==
Vesa-Matti Loiri	Uuno Turhapuro
Marjatta Raita	Elisabeth Turhapuro
Tapio Hämäläinen	Councillor Tuura
Marita Nordberg	Mrs. Tuura
Olavi Ahonen	Hugo Turhapuro, Uuno's father
Simo Salminen	Sörsselssön
Spede Pasanen	Härski Hartikainen
Helge Herala	Teacher Happonen
Marja Korhonen	Mrs. Happonen
Elli Castrén	Unelma Säleikkö, secretary of Councillor Tuura
Mirjam Himberg	Shopkeeper Rentukka
Jyrki Kovaleff	Bank manager
Jukka Sipilä	Agrarian councillor
Juhani Kumpulainen	Heiveröinen, manager of gas station
Johanna Raunio	Greta, female detective
Risto Aaltonen	Psychiatrist
Yrjö Parjanne	Minister of Traffic Reenpää
Paavo Väyrynen	Himself

== Plot ==
Uuno's father-in-law, Councillor Tuura, is losing his nerves again. He decides to make a complete change in his life, and moves to the country together with his wife and daughter Elisabeth without telling Uuno about it. Uuno, on the other hand, has decided to try to salvage his marriage by spending a week away from home, without telling his wife where he is. When Uuno returns with flowers, his wife has moved away. Uuno finds a notice left by Elisabeth in the refrigerator, although the notice was written by Uuno's father-in-law. Uuno hears that Härski Hartikainen and Sörsselssön plan to close down the car service station and go to emergency service work. Uuno joins them.

Councillor Tuura and the women arrive in the countryside at the mansion they have bought. Tuura admires the peaceful country life and a door that Uuno won't be passing through. At that moment, the door opens and Uuno enters. Uuno, Hartikainen and Sörsselssön have been given a job to measure the direction of a new road under construction, which the engineers have drawn to pass directly through the mansion that Tuura has bought. Tuura gets annoyed about the direction lines and the fact that he has bought a mansion from Uuno's home village. Tuura takes a taxi for three hundred kilometres to Helsinki to meet the Minister of Traffic and hears that the minister is on vacation in the same village where Tuura bought the mansion from. Tuura returns to the countryside and meets the minister at his summer cabin. The minister takes Tuura's business up for discussion at the Council of Traffic. At the same time, Uuno and Elisabeth go to visit Uuno's father Hugo, who has all kinds of inventions at his home. Hugo is secretly brewing moonshine and fears that the sheriff will hear of it. Elisabeth thinks she has still more to learn from the men in the Turhapuro family. After the countryside work, the Turhapuro men get to their favourite pastime. Uuno also visits his old teacher.

Tuura tries to find out ways to stop the road construction and Uuno figures out an idea to make the mansion into a vacation resort. His in-laws and Elisabeth do a lot of repair and clean-up work to make the mansion into a vacation resort. Meanwhile, Uuno receives the first customer, who is Kreetta, a "spy" hired by Tuura. Because of a mistake, Kreetta follows Uuno's actions and not the real target given by Tuura. Uuno entertains Kreetta by riding a bicycle on the wheat fields, planting wheat, riding water-skis and going to the sauna. The Council of Traffic plans to move the road around Tuura's mansion. This suggestion is greatly opposed. The matter is put aside until a "summer event" organised by Uuno has been held, where Uuno's father secretly makes people drink moonshine. Uuno receives two million markka from Tuura to turn around the heads of the Council of Traffic. After a successful summer event, the Council of Traffic meets, to vote for the road to pass through Tuura's lands at the direction of the school teacher. The minister draws a line on the map. Tuura is disappointed about the issue, until Uuno's father arrives and is ready to buy the mansion. Tuura laughs, but Hugo has enough money for the mansion and so they go to sign a deed. Uuno arrives to tell that he held a ruler and his thumb so that the road made a bend around Tuura's mansion. Tuura goes to follow Uuno's father, who has gone to the farmhand's home.
