= Koeputkiaikuinen ja Simon enkelit =

- Original Finnish film poster
- Directed by: Spede Pasanen
- Written by: Spede Pasanen
- Produced by: Spede Pasanen
- Starring: Spede Pasanen; Simo Salminen; Vesa-Matti Loiri; Tapio Hämäläinen; Olavi Ahonen
- Cinematography: Martti Kakko; Henrik Paersch; Timo Wäre
- Edited by: Eero Jaakkola; Eva Jaakontalo
- Music by: Spede Pasanen (as Jürgen von Schnitzel); Jaakko Salo
- Distributed by: Funny-Films Oy
- Release date: 1979
- Country: Finland
- Language: Finnish

Koeputkiaikuinen ja Simon enkelit (The Test-tube Adult and Simo's Angels) is a 1979 Finnish comedy film directed, written and starring Spede Pasanen, along with the typical comic-cast of Simo Salminen, Vesa-Matti Loiri, Tapio Hämäläinen and Olavi Ahonen.

== Plot summary ==
Mathematician Mauno Mutikainen is accidentally pronounced dead as a result of an operation where a splinter is being removed from his finger, which he got by scratching his head. He is then cloned into a "test-tube adult", a play on the phrase test-tube child, named Richard Ilyevitch Jyrä by his creator, father and mother, Dr. Jyrä, his name is intended to appeal to both American and Soviet sensibilities.

The gangsters Luigi and Teuvo attempt to unsuccessfully to kidnap Jyrä and/or Mutikainen, thinking they are the same person. This is first to blackmail Jyrä but later their plans change to develop a superhuman army.

Simo runs a detective agency tasked with protecting Jyrä. One of his angels poses as Jyrä's lab assistant. Simo himself is constantly beset by terrible luck, being imprisoned and having his briefcase stolen by the gangsters as the movie goes on.

== Cast ==
- Spede Pasanen as Mauno Mutikainen and Richard Jyrä
- Tapio Hämäläinen as Doctor Jyrä
- Simo Salminen as Simo
- Vesa-Matti Loiri as Gangster Luigi, Church Clerk, Hockey Tourist and Uuno Turhapuro
- Olavi Ahonen as Gangster Teuvo

The angels were portrayed by Rita Polster, Kirsti Wallasvaara, Ritva Vepsä and Merja Tammi. Pasanen, Loiri, Hämäläinen and Ahonen would reprise their roles in 1980's Tup-akka-lakko. Additionally Loiri as Uuno Turhapuro at the end. Previous Spede film alumni Helge Herala and Seppo Laine appear in minor supporting roles in the film.

== Production ==
Because Spede struggled to find funding for his movies throughout the 1970s, the film is only his second feature to be filmed entirely in colour and also his third film over-all to be filmed in colour. Leikkikalugangsteri was filmed principally in black and white with the film's ending being in colour, while Pohjantähteet, released the same year, was the first Spede film to be entirely in colour.

In line with Pasanen's productions made during the 1980s, the film heavily re-uses the same sets and scenes throughout. The film was shot on video and later transferred to film for theatrical distribution. Pasanen developed this technique while shooting the first Uuno Turhapuro film and continued to use it for all of his films throughout the 1980s. This also marked the first time Spede was the lone director of the film, his previous credits having been as co-director. Pasanen would also direct the film's sequel by himself the following year.

Similar to his debut film X-Paroni, Pasanen portrays a dual-role. Vesa-Matti Loiri, Simo Salminen, Olavi Ahonen and Tapio Hämäläinen had only recently become nationally renowned for their involvement in Spede's Uuno Turhapuro franchise.
