= Uuno Turhapuro muuttaa maalle (video game) =

1986 video game

- Commodore 64 cover art
- Developer: Pasi Hytönen
- Publisher: Amersoft
- Producer: Petter Kinnunen
- Designer: Pasi Hytönen
- Composers: Jori Olkkonen; Jaakko Salo(original main theme)
- Platform: Commodore 64
- Release: FIN: 1986
- Genre: Side-scroller
- Mode: Single-player

Uuno Turhapuro muuttaa maalle is a side-scrolling video game, available for the Commodore 64. It was developed by the Finnish programmer Pasi Hytönen in 1986 and published by Amersoft, one of the first game publishers in Finland. It is regarded as the first commercially successful Finnish video game, in part due to its subject matter and "near-sadistic difficulty".

The game is based on the popular Finnish comedy character Uuno Turhapuro (Numbskull Emptybrook), created by Spede Pasanen and played by the actor Vesa-Matti Loiri. The game was released in the same year as the film of the same name. Uuno Turhapuro muuttaa maalle was the first Finnish game based on a movie license.

== Plot ==
At the start of the game the main character Uuno Turhapuro finds a note left inside the fridge by his wife Elisabeth Turhapuro. Uuno's wife has left home, but she doesn't reveal her whereabouts. The note simply says that her lawyers will contact Uuno later on.

In the movie Uuno takes the government job as a road surveyor. This will lead him to his hometown in the countryside, where by coincidence Uuno's stressed-out father-in-law Councillor Tuura has recently bought an estate. Tuura is accompanied by his wife, as well as Elisabeth. The earlier note was actually written by Tuura, who tried to trick Uuno. Some of Uuno's relatives, including his father, are also living in the town.

The game was never localized outside of Finland, but a rough English translation of the title is Uuno Turhapuro moves to the countryside.

== Gameplay ==
Uuno Turhapuro muuttaa maalle is a traditional 2D side-scrolling game, where the screen continuously scrolls from left to right. The player controls the vertical movement of the character Uuno in order to avoid different obstacles and enemies such as birds and angry neighbors. The player must travel a certain distance with four lives and earn money in the process.

The game consists of three different levels loosely based on a movie. For example, the first level contains Uuno being pulled by an off-screen car on the dirt road of his hometown while holding a farming plow, the second level shows Uuno water skiing, and the third and final level contains Uuno looking for his father's moonshining stills in the local forest.

== Reception ==
The game sold 1,600 copies before the Christmas of 1986, and 2,000 copies were sold overall. Amersoft considered making a sequel, but went bankrupt before any such game could be created.

The game has gained a cult reputation for its "almost sadistic difficulty level". In 2014, journalist Juho Kuorikoski criticized the game's game mechanics and controls, saying that "no one but masochists play Uuno anymore".

The cassette version was sold in an internet auction in August 2014 for over €250. In 2021, the price of the floppy disk version of the game rose again to €3,712 on the Huuto.net website.

A copy of the game can be found and played by visitors to the Finnish Museum of Games in Tampere, Finland.
