= A Charming Mass Suicide =

A Charming Mass Suicide may refer to:

- A Charming Mass Suicide (novel), a 1990 Finnish novel by Arto Paasilinna
- A Charming Mass Suicide (film), a 2000 Finnish film, based on the novel
