= Olavi Ahonen =

Finnish film actor and comedian

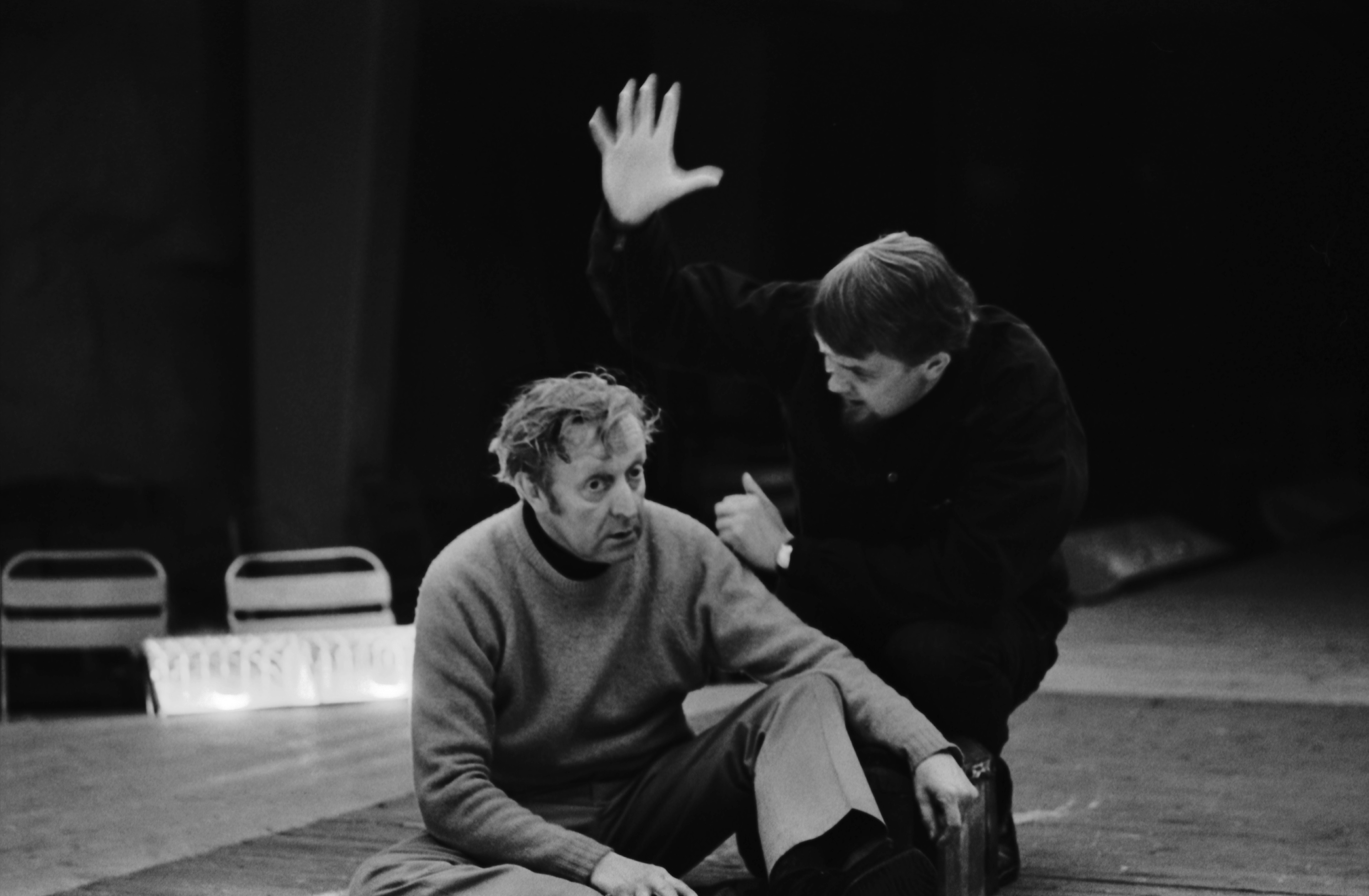
- Olavi Ahonen (left) at rehearsals of The Robbers in 1970, directed by Kalle Holmberg.
- Born: 21 July 1923; Tikkakoski, Finland
- Died: 1 September 2000 (aged 77); Helsinki, Finland
- Occupation: Actor

Kauko Olavi Ahonen (21 July 1923 in Tikkakoski – 1 September 2000 in Helsinki, Finland) was a Finnish film actor.

Ahonen first appeared in film in 1954 and made many appearances in Finnish film between then and 1997. He also appeared in many films by Spede Pasanen.

From 1990, he only appeared on TV in Finland until his retirement in 1997. He died in 2000.

== Filmography ==
- Niskavuoren Aarne (1954)
- The Unknown Soldier (1955)
- Elokuu (1956)
- Virtaset ja Lahtiset (1959)
- Pojat (1962)
- Pinsiön parooni (1962)
- Oppenheimerin tapaus (1967)
- Here, Beneath the North Star (1968)
- Rottasota (1968)
- Äl' yli päästä perhanaa (1968)
- Noin seitsemän veljestä (1968)
- Sotamies Svejkin seikkailuja (1968) (TV series)
- Ystävykset (1969)
- Paluu (1969)
- Akseli and Elina (1970)
- Speedy Gonzales – noin 7 veljeksen poika (1970)
- Kahdeksas veljes (1971)
- Hirttämättömät (1971)
- Niilon oppivuodet (1971)
- Mummoni ja Mannerheim (1971) (TV series)
- Ällitälli (1971–1973) (TV series)
- Pohjantähti (1973)
- Meiltähän tämä käy (1973)
- Robin Hood ja hänen iloiset vekkulinsa Sherwoodin pusikoissa (1974) (TV series)
- Transvetjan tarinoita (1975)
- Häpy Endkö? Eli kuinka Uuno Turhapuro sai niin kauniin ja rikkaan vaimon (1977)
- Viimeinen savotta (1977)
- Aika hyvä ihmiseksi (1977)
- Syksyllä kaikki on toisin (1978)
- Piilopirtti (1978)
- Rautakauppias Uuno Turhapuro – presidentin vävy (1978)
- Koeputkiaikuinen ja Simon enkelit (1979)
- Ruskan jälkeen (1979)
- Tup-akka-lakko (1980)
- Borrowing Matchsticks (1980)
- Pölhölä (1981)
- Uuno Turhapuron aviokriisi (1981)
- Valehtelijoiden klubi (1981) (TV series)
- Ulvova mylläri (1982)
- Jousiampuja (1982)
- Jon (1983)
- Koomikko (1983)
- Uuno Turhapuro muuttaa maalle (1986)
- Jäähyväiset presidentille (1987)
- Ihmiselon ihanuus ja kurjuus (1988)
- Petos (1988)
- Uunon huikeat poikamiesvuodet maaseudulla (1990)
- Lentsu (1990) (TV series)
- Irti maasta (1990)
- Ruusujen aika (1990–1991) (TV series)
- Uuno Turhapuro – Suomen tasavallan herra presidentti (1992)
- Viimeiset siemenperunat (1993) (TV series)
- Pimennys (1993) (TV series)
- Tuomas Murasen rikos (1994)
- Kaikki pelissä (1994)
- Maigret Suomessa (1996)
- Siivoton juttu (1997)
