= Risto Aaltonen =

Finnish actor (1939–2021)

- Born: Risto Kalevi Aaltonen; March 16, 1939; Helsinki, Finland
- Died: March 8, 2021 (aged 81)
- Occupations: Actor, director
- Years active: 1960s–2021
- Notable work: Hanski, Leikkikalugangsteri, Master Class

Risto Kalevi Aaltonen (16 March 1939 – 8 March 2021) was a Finnish actor.

== Biography ==
Aaltonen was born in Helsinki. He became known in Finland for his roles as Kalle in the sixties series Hanski and for his role as a gangster in the 1969 comedy film Leikkikalugangsteri. In the 1960s and 1970s he also did some work as a film and theatre director. On stage, one of his memorable roles was Zhdanov in David Pownall's Master Class which was given over 200 times at the Finnish National Theatre in the late 1980s.

== Filmography ==
=== Film ===
Year	Film	Role
1962	Vaarallista vapautta	Saarinen
1967	Ihmisiä elämän pohjalla	Vaska Pepel
1968	Vihreä leski	Pentti Lehmusto
1969	Leikkikalugangsteri	gangsteripäällikkö Niitti
1970	Pilvilinna	liikemies autossa
1979	Ruskan jälkeen	Kosti Mäkinen
1981	Kiljusen herrasväki	hotellin portieeri
1982	Uuno Turhapuro menettää muistinsa	Alkon myyjä
1983	Rikos ja rangaistus	maalari
1984	Eläköön itsemurhaaja!	Viktor Viktorovitsh
1985	Hei kliffa hei	jymäytettävä taksikuski
1986	Uuno Turhapuro muuttaa maalle	psykiatri
1987	Jäähyväiset presidentille	Mertasen auton pysäyttävä poliisi
1988	Tupla-Uuno	gangsteri Seksström
1990	Vääpeli Körmy ja marsalkan sauva	lääkäri kuulontarkastuksessa
1991	Kuutamosonaatti 2: Kadunlakaisijat	manageri
1994	Vääpeli Körmy - taisteluni	kenraali Ribberg
1994	Uuno Turhapuron veli	Tarmon anopin yhtiön johtokunnan jäsen
1994	Kaikki pelissä	patologi Rautonen
1996	Sergein totuus	Helminen
1997	Siivoton juttu	
1998	Poliisin poika	kauppias
1998	Johtaja Uuno Turhapuro – pisnismies	1. venäläinen gangsteri
2000	Hurmaava joukkoitsemurha	poliisijohtaja Sakari Urpela
2001	Emmauksen tiellä	Paakkila
2004	Keisarikunta	Bering
2005	Lupaus	kirkkoherra Tuusulassa
2006	Rock'n Roll Never Dies	Ammattikoulun opettaja
2007	V2 - Jäätynyt enkeli	Edwin Hopea
2011	Syvälle salattu	Lantto

=== TV ===
Year	Series	Role
1963	Pesänrakentajat	Martti
1965	Taivaan ja talojen välillä	Dave Riley
1966	Rahkeiset	Matti Koivulahti
1966–1973	Hanski	Kalle
1976–1978	Koivuharju	Erkki Ahoranta
2000	Raid	liikemies Hallvik
2004	Kotikatu	Rekku Kaakko
2004	Pelkovaara	Pentti Reunanen
2005	Presidentit	P. E. Svinhufvud
2006	Bodomin legenda	Santeri Hallanheimo
2009	Lopun alku	Kairamo

=== Dubbing (in Finnish) ===
Year	Series	Role
1980	Popeye	additional voices
1984	Sherlock Hound	Captain Raythunder
1985-1992	The Raccoons	Ralph Raccoon, Cyril Sneer
1987–1990	DuckTales	Flintheart Glomgold
1988–1989	Janoschs Traumstunde	one of the narrators
1989	Asterix and the Big Fight	Propelix
1989-1992	The Fruitties	Roly, Thistle
1993	We're Back! A Dinosaur's Story	Rex
2002	Treasure Planet	narrator
2005	Kronk's New Groove	additional voices
2011	The Smurfs	Papa Smurf
