= Millipilleri =

1966 Finnish comedy film

- Directed by: Spede Pasanen; Ere Kokkonen; Jukka Virtanen
- Written by: Spede Pasanen; Ere Kokkonen; Jukka Virtanen
- Produced by: Spede Pasanen
- Starring: Spede Pasanen; Simo Salminen; Hannes Häyrynen
- Cinematography: Ilkka Linnansalmi; Kari Sohlberg
- Music by: Jouko Ahera
- Release date: 1966
- Language: Finnish

Millipilleri is a 1966 comedy film directed and written by Spede Pasanen, Ere Kokkonen and Jukka Virtanen. The film was Spede's second starring feature after X-Paroni, Pasanen having established himself as a popular comedian in both radio and television. The film was one of Spede's biggest hits and launched his film career further. It also features several actors who would star in Spede's consequent films Pähkähullu Suomi and Noin 7 Veljestä.

== Plot ==
Tarmo Saari is the prodigal nephew of Councillor Ö (Häyrynen) who has several university degrees but has not worked a day in his life. Ö, becoming fed-up with his lazy nephew orders him to earn a million Finnish marks in one month or he will testament his fortune to an antiquities society. A group of gangsters led by Mr. Big (Kokkonen) overhear the councillor and plot to rob him of his fortunes.

Tarmo is disheartened by his fate until his friend Hannu (Salminen) helps him with some morale boosting pills. The pills are actually just sugar pills but Tarmo feels their effects nevertheless.

== Cast ==
- Spede Pasanen as Tarmo Saari
- Simo Salminen as Hannu
- Hannes Häyrynen as Councillor Ö (Ö is the Swedish word for island, which is in Finnish is saari).
- Ere Kokkonen as Herra Iso (Mr. Big)
- Jukka Virtanen as Tappaja (Killer)
- Aarre Elo as Aivo (Brain)
- Juhani Kumpulainen as psychiatrist von Hermander

== Production ==
Pasanen and his co-directors of X-Paroni, Risto Jarva and Jaakko Pakkasvirta parted ways after Spede's first feature. The film was the first co-operative film between Spede, Ere Kokkonen and Jukka Virtanen. Kokkonen and Virtanen were primarily responsible for directing the film while Spede planned most of the gags and humour. The film also included the first notable appearance by Simo Salminen in Spede's films as his side-kick after playing a minor supporting role in X-Paroni.

Juhani Kumpulainen and Marita Nordberg, both of whom appeared in numerous future Spede films, also made their first appearance in Spede's films here.
