= Pohjan tähteet =

- Original Finnish film poster
- Directed by: Ere Kokkonen
- Written by: Ere Kokkonen; Vesa-Matti Loiri; Spede Pasanen
- Produced by: Spede Pasanen
- Starring: Vesa-Matti Loiri; Simo Salminen; Arja Saijonmaa; Ville-Veikko Salminen
- Cinematography: Kari Sohlberg
- Edited by: Taina Kanth
- Music by: Esko Linnavalli
- Production company: Filmituotanto Spede Pasanen Oy
- Distributed by: Filmituotanto Spede Pasanen Oy
- Release date: 25 December 1969 (Finland)
- Running time: 87 minutes
- Country: Finland
- Language: Finnish
- Budget: 390,000 FIM
- Box office: 310,000 FIM

Pohjan tähteet (also known as Pohjantähteet) is a 1969 Finnish comedy film directed by Ere Kokkonen. It is the seventh Spede film, the first Spede film shot in color, and the first film in which Spede Pasanen did not appear as one of the lead actors. The film stars Vesa-Matti Loiri, Simo Salminen, Arja Saijonmaa, and Ville-Veikko Salminen.

== Plot ==
Director Paavali Pohja (Vesa-Matti Loiri) has a dream of creating a revolutionary movie. He gathers an eccentric film crew to make his vision a reality. However, the process is fraught with comedic obstacles, including budgetary constraints, technical challenges, and the quirky personalities of his team. Chaos ensues as Pohja tries to maintain control over the increasingly absurd production.

== Cast ==
- Vesa-Matti Loiri as Paavali Pohja
- Simo Salminen as Kalle
- Arja Saijonmaa as Ulla
- Ville-Veikko Salminen as Ville

== Production ==
Pohjan tähteet was Spede Pasanen's first entirely color film, whereas Leikkikalugangsteri featured only a 14-minute color sequence. In the script, Pasanen, Kokkonen, and Loiri incorporated mishaps that had occurred during the production of their earlier films. Actor Ville-Veikko Salminen was injured during the filming of a scooter scene that ended in a crash, resulting in a one-week break in production. The character Suohullu Pähkä (Veikko Sinisalo) appearing in the film's finale was borrowed from the movie Pähkähullu Suomi.

The film was shot in various locations, including Helsinki, Porvoo, Hämeenlinna, Lahti, Lohja, Savonlinna, Tuusula, Espoo, Rovaniemi, Punkaharju, Muonio, Kittilä, and Sipoo.

During production, Simo Salminen saved Loiri's life. In one scene, Pohja grabs onto a ski lift and rides it to the top of Olostunturi. Loiri believed he could hold on for the entire ride without safety straps, but Salminen insisted he be secured to the lift. Eventually, Loiri agreed to Salminen's demand. Midway through the ascent, Loiri's strength gave out, and he lost consciousness. Without the safety straps, he would have fallen from a height of ten meters onto the rocky terrain below.

The film's cinematographer, Kari Sohlberg, won the Jussi Award for Best Cinematography in part for his work on this film, as well as Leikkikalugangsteri and Sixtynine 69.

Pohjan tähteet was released on VHS and DVD. It was broadcast on television in 1971, 1974, 1977, 1984, 1995, 2004, 2006, and 2013. The DVD release features a black-and-white cover image and screenshots on the back, which incorrectly suggest the film itself is black-and-white.
