= Leikkikalugangsteri =

- Film poster
- Directed by: Ere Kokkonen
- Written by: Spede Pasanen; Ere Kokkonen
- Starring: Spede Pasanen; Tamara Lund; Vesa-Matti Loiri; Simo Salminen; Juha Jokela
- Cinematography: Kari Sohlberg
- Distributed by: Filmituotanto Spede Pasanen Ky
- Release date: 1969
- Country: Finland
- Language: Finnish

Leikkikalugangsteri (English: The Toy Gangster) is a 1969 comedy directed by Ere Kokkonen, written and starring Spede Pasanen. It was released the same year as Spede's Näköradiomiehen ihmeelliset siekailut and Pohjan tähteet. Though the film is principally in black and white, the last 20 minutes are filmed in colour.

Kari Sohlberg won the 1970 Jussi Award nomination for Best Cinematography jointly for the film along with Jörn Donner's Sixtynine 69 and Pohjan tähteet.

== Plot ==
Jim King (Spede Pasanen) is the rich owner of a toy company and a constant pain for his closest competitor Krakström (Juhani Kumpulainen) from whom he keeps snatching important toy contracts. As a result, Krakström's company is nearing bankruptcy, which causes friction when King starts dating Krakström's daughter Sylvi (Tamara Lund).

However, King's company can't make a profit since the taxes they must pay increase exponentially as the company becomes bigger. As a way of keeping his company in business, King tries to get his company a tax break by hiring the country's best gangster, Nitti (Risto Aaltonen), to break into his safe which isn't ensured. However, his dutiful Treasurer (Vesa-Matti Loiri) has the safe ensured just as the crime is to be committed, thus undoing his scheme.

When the theft is reported in the papers, Krakström gets the idea of collecting the insurance of a painting in his office, and by sheer coincidence hires the same gangster to commit the crime. However, the painting ends up returned to Krakström against his will by the well-meaning Jim. Krakström also attempts to fake his own daughter's kidnapping to get his hands on King's money, but King gets it back by copying the scheme.

While this is going on, King's Treasurer suddenly comes into possession of a large amount of excess money even though all of the company's cash has been deposited in the bank. Not realising that he has actually turned in the cash-boxes which contain his sandwich-making materials, the Treasurer begins to spend the money on driving lessons, a new car, hygiene products and in putting an ad in the paper to find himself a woman.

In a final desperate effort, Krakström hires Nitti to rob a bank and involuntarily involves King, who is trying to help Sylvi who has discovered that the bank is missing 500,000 marks. The money is obviously that found by King's Treasurer. While King attempts to return the money to the bank, Nitti then decides to do as Krakström originally instructed and rob the bank clean. King manages to defuse the situation with some laughing gas and when the police take Nitti, Krakström, King and his associates to the station, Nitti's bag is revealed only to contain the cash-boxes with the Treasurer's sandwich equipment.

In the end, Jim and Sylvi get married and in a show of good-will, King writes Krakström a check to save his company.

== Cast ==
- Spede Pasanen – Jim King, the toy-company millionaire.
- Vesa-Matti Loiri – Treasurer, King's treasurer who accidentally deposits the cash-boxes containing his sandwich making materials, instead of the company's 500'000 marks.
- Simo Salminen – Designer Sulo Rantavaara, the mastermind behind King's successful toys.
- Juhani Kumpulainen – Krakström, King's rival in the toy industry.
- Tamara Lund – Sylvi Krakström, Krakström's daughter who works as a bank-teller and takes a liking to King.
- Jukka Sipilä – Krakström's servant; referred to by many names by Krakström, he performs the duties of a secretary, a driver and a general underling doing his dirty work. Due to Krakström's financial difficulties, he is the last person working at his company.
- Risto Aaltonen – Nitti, a gangster hired by both King and Krakström at various points in the film.
- Pirkko Mannola – Nitti's girlfriend, who catches King and Rantavaara when they break into Krakström's office for the second time to return the paintings stolen by Nitti and forces them to help with the bank robbery.
- Leo Jokela – Detective Sirpaleaho, the detective who is called to investigate the crimes committed by Nitti.

Ere Kokkonen appears in an uncredited cameo as an American toy investor at the beginning of the film.

== Black and white to colour switch ==
The film features a rarely seen switch from black and white into colour. The gangster Nitti, upon waking up on the morning of the bank robbery, doesn't get his usual morning drink. As he sobers up, the film turns to colour and remains so for much of the finale, except for a brief moment in Jim and Sylvi's wedding when Nitti starts drinking again.

The switch technically makes Leikkikalugangsteri Pasanen's first colour feature. Pohjantähteet, released the same year, was the first feature by Spede and Ere Kokkonen to be filmed fully in colour.
