= Paavo Piironen =

Finnish actor (1943–1974)

- Born: 6 June 1943; Helsinki, Finland
- Died: 6 November 1974; Finland

Paavo Piironen (6 June 1943 in Helsinki – 6 November 1974) was a Finnish film and television actor, director and writer of the 1960s and early 1970s. He is perhaps best known for his work on the 1971 film comedy Saatanan radikaalit in which he starred and co-directed alongside Heikki Nousiainen, Timo Nissi and Heikki Huopainen.

He died in 1974 in a traffic accident.

== Filmography ==
- Tyttö ja hattu (1961)
- Oksat pois... (1961)
- Pikku Suorasuu (1962)
- Pähkähullu Suomi (1967)
- Lauantai (1967)
- Speedy Gonzales - Noin 7 veljeksen poika (1970)
- Akseli and Elina (1970)
- Saatanan radikaalit (1971)
- Kahdeksas veljes (1971)
