= Uuno Turhapuro (film) =

- Original Finnish poster
- Directed by: Ere Kokkonen
- Written by: Spede Pasanen
- Produced by: Spede Pasanen
- Starring: Vesa-Matti Loiri; Marjatta Raita; Spede Pasanen; Simo Salminen; Juhani Kumpulainen; Anna-Liisa Ruotsi
- Distributed by: Filmituotanto Spede Pasanen OY
- Release date: 24 August 1973
- Running time: 87 min.
- Country: Finland
- Language: Finnish
- Budget: FIM 600,000 ($117,518)
- Box office: $1.3 million

Uuno Turhapuro is a 1973 Finnish comedy film directed by Ere Kokkonen, and the first, black and white Uuno Turhapuro film. It stars Vesa-Matti Loiri, Marjatta Raita, Pertti Pasanen, and Simo Salminen.

Uuno Turhapuro is the main character of the film, which was created by Spede and Loiri for Spede Show. The unexpected success led to the creation of a 19-movie series. In an effort to save money, Uuno became Spede's first feature to be filmed and edited on video before being printed to film for theatrical distribution. This method was employed by Spede all the way into his late 1980s features.

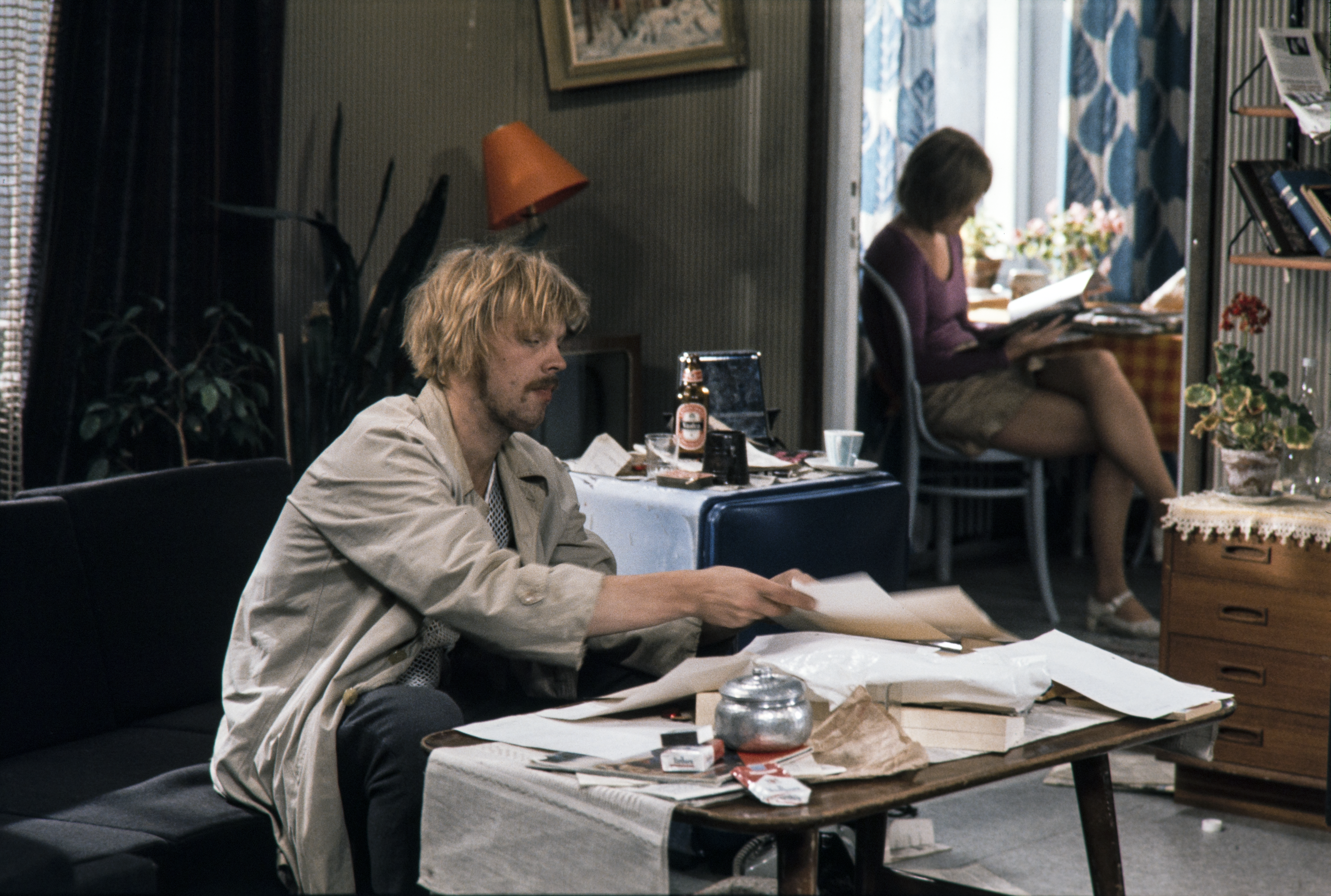
The shootings of the film in Helsinki in July 1973. Actor Vesa-Matti Loiri with actress Marjatta Raita in the background.

The film was the first produced by Spede after nearly a two-year-long hiatus, when Spede's three feature films released in 1971 (Hirttämättömät, Saatanan Radikaalit and Kahdeksas Veljes) all failed to make a notable profit.

== Plot ==
Uuno (Vesa-Matti Loiri) is shabby and lazy man, who has married a rich woman Elisabeth (Marjatta Raita) in order to eat and sleep from day to day without any worries. Completely tired of overtaking Uuno, Elisabeth tries to get her husband to look for a job, but Uuno has other plans: he wants to build a violin for himself. But has Uuno really found his true calling?

== Reception ==
The film was the second most popular in Finland between 1972 and 1976 with 593,744 admissions, behind The Earth Is a Sinful Song.
