= Uuno Turhapuron aviokriisi =

- DVD cover of Uuno Turhapuron aviokriisi.
- Directed by: Ere Kokkonen
- Written by: Spede Pasanen
- Produced by: Spede Pasanen
- Starring: Vesa-Matti Loiri, Marjatta Raita, Tapio Hämäläinen, Elli Castrén, Pentti Siimes
- Distributed by: Spede-Production Oy (as Funny-Films Oy in film)
- Release date: 1981
- Running time: 1 h 35 min
- Country: Finland
- Language: Finnish

Uuno Turhapuron aviokriisi (The Marital Crisis of Uuno Turhapuro, also The Marital Crisis of Numbskull Emptybrook) is a Finnish 1981 comedy film written by Spede Pasanen and directed by Ere Kokkonen. It is the sixth film in the Uuno Turhapuro series, and it is the first Uuno Turhapuro film in color, while the previous ones were still black and white due to budgetary reasons.

Uuno Turhapuron aviokriisi was the biggest audience success of 1981 and the most successful Uuno Turhapuro film after Lottovoittaja UKK Turhapuro despite the fact that, like the previous parts, the critics had a very negative attitude towards the film. The film premiered on Mainostelevisio on April 8, 1984, when it was seen by more than 1.5 million viewers.

== Plot ==
Uuno (Vesa-Matti Loiri) has such a good sense of smell that he can smell through the window glass blindfolded what all the food is behind the glass. The police becomes interested in Uuno when he uses his sense of smell to help the police catch a thief. The police take Uuno as a student at the police dog school. The media publicity brought by this makes Uuno's father-in-law, Councillor Tuura (Tapio Hämäläinen), extremely nervous, considering the fact that this is mainly a reputational loss for him. This causes Tuura to plot the destruction of his daughter Elisabeth (Marjatta Raita) and Uuno's marriage, which is already in the worst crisis ever. For this, Tuura plans to use his beautiful secretary (Elli Castrén) and the "professional lover" (Pentti Siimes) as aids. At the same time, as a kind of side plot of the film, Uuno's friends Härski Hartikainen (Spede Pasanen) and Sörsselssön (Simo Salminen) tease the foremen with salary changes.
