= Uuno Turhapuro – kaksoisagentti =

- DVD cover
- Directed by: Spede Pasanen
- Written by: Spede Pasanen
- Produced by: Spede Pasanen
- Starring: Vesa-Matti Loiri; Tapio Hämäläinen; Marjatta Raita; Marita Nordberg; Simo Salminen
- Distributed by: Filmituotanto Spede Pasanen Oy
- Release date: 1987
- Running time: 1h 33 min
- Language: Finnish

Uuno Turhapuro – kaksoisagentti (English: Uuno Turhapuro the Double Agent) is a Finnish 1987 comedy film written and directed by Spede Pasanen. It is the twelfth film in the Uuno Turhapuro series, and at the same time the first one to be made without Ere Kokkonen.

The film received approximately 200,000 fewer viewers than the previous Uuno Turhapuro muuttaa maalle, but was still by far the best domestic audience success of 1987. Now, the Finnish Film Foundation also supported Turhapuro for the first time in the form of additional copy support.

== Plot ==
Councillor Tuura (Tapio Hämäläinen) has once again come up with a plan to get rid of his hated son-in-law Uuno Turhapuro (Vesa-Matti Loiri). Tuura convinces Uuno that he has "another daughter" from a previous marriage, Lisbeth Tuura (Hannele Lauri), who has arrived in Finland from America, and who is supposedly also going to inherit Tuura's fortune someday. The plan is to get Uuno, who is infatuated with Lisbeth, to divorce Elisabeth (Marjatta Raita) and marry instead her "sister" Lisbeth with Tuura's blessing. Only Uuno's friend Härski-Hartikainen (Spede Pasanen), to whom Uuno had promised a fraction of his father-in-law's inheritance, suspects that Tuura is up to something fishy and begins investigating the case, making Uuno and their friend Sörsselssön (Simo Salminen) his secret agents.
