= Häpy Endkö? Eli kuinka Uuno Turhapuro sai niin kauniin ja rikkaan vaimon =

1977 film directed by Ere Kokkonen

- DVD cover
- Directed by: Ere Kokkonen
- Written by: Spede Pasanen
- Produced by: Spede Pasanen
- Starring: Vesa-Matti Loiri; Marjatta Raita; Tapio Hämäläinen; Ritva Valkama; Olavi Ahonen
- Distributed by: Spede-Production Oy
- Release date: 1977
- Running time: 1 h 24 min
- Country: Finland
- Language: Finnish

Häpy Endkö? Eli kuinka Uuno Turhapuro sai niin kauniin ja rikkaan vaimon is a Finnish 1977 comedy film written by Spede Pasanen and directed by Ere Kokkonen. It is the fourth film in the Uuno Turhapuro series. Its title translates to "A Happy End? Or how Uuno Turhapuro got such a beautiful and rich wife".

== Plot ==
Uuno moves in flight cargo to Helsinki for the search of a rich, beautiful wife. He buys elegant clothes for eight marks from an estate auction and in two weeks becomes the most pursued bachelor in town, charming all the women. He also starts as a waiter in Vaaleanpunainen sika (Pink Pig), which starts the first quarrels between him and his father-in-law.
