= Uuno Turhapuron muisti palailee pätkittäin =

1983 Finnish film

- DVD cover of Uuno Turhapuron muisti palailee pätkittäin.
- Directed by: Ere Kokkonen
- Written by: Spede Pasanen
- Produced by: Spede Pasanen
- Starring: Vesa-Matti Loiri; Marjatta Raita; Spede Pasanen; Simo Salminen; Tapio Hämäläinen
- Distributed by: Spede-Production O] (as Filmituotanto Spede Pasanen Oy in film)
- Release date: 1983
- Running time: 1 h 31 min
- Country: Finland
- Languages: Finnish, Russian

Uuno Turhapuron muisti palailee pätkittäin (Uuno Turhapuro's Memory Slowly Comes Back, also Numbskull Emptybrook's Memory Slowly Comes Back) is a Finnish 1983 comedy film written by Spede Pasanen and directed by Ere Kokkonen. It is the eighth film in the Uuno Turhapuro series.

== Plot ==
In the previous film, Uuno Turhapuro (Vesa-Matti Loiri) lost his memory, but has recently regained it. Soon, Uuno loses his memory again, this time imagining that he is an expectant mother, which naturally makes his father-in-law Councillor Tuura (Tapio Hämäläinen) nervous just as a Soviet trade delegation is scheduled to arrive in the country for a visit. In the meantime, Uuno's friends Härski-Hartikainen (Spede Pasanen) and Sörsselssön (Simo Salminen) participate in a language course, as a result of which Hartikainen learns to speak Russian and Sörsselssön only understands it, which proves to be surprisingly helpful when the Soviet trade delegation arrives in Helsinki without an interpreter. Amidst all the turmoil, thanks to Turhapuro himself, plans are even underway to plan a new sequel to the film The Unknown Soldier.

A promotional piece was added at the end of the film as a joke, revealing that the next Uuno Turhapuro film would be called Uuno Turhapuro – Leningradin lemmikki (Uuno Turhapuro: The Pet of Leningrad); however, the film was never released.

== Reception ==
The film received a significantly more negative reception from critics than its predecessor. Helena Ylönen from Helsingin Sanomat sees the film more as an "intermediate work" in a film series, in which Uuno Turhapuro is almost a supporting character in his own film, which she considers "one of the film's biggest mistakes". Two out of ten Finnish premiere critics gave the film one star, three gave it none, and five did not rate the film; the average rating was 0.4 stars out of four. In the Video-opas film guide from 1994, the film receives one star out of five, which corresponds to the verbal rating "bad".

One of the most memorable scenes in the film is the waiter (played by Heikki Kinnunen) getting drunk, which has been called "one of the best drunken scenes in Finnish films".

== See also ==
- List of Finnish films of the 1980s
