= Tupla-Uuno =

- DVD cover of Tupla-Uuno.
- Directed by: Hannu Seikkula
- Written by: Spede Pasanen
- Produced by: Spede Pasanen
- Starring: Vesa-Matti Loiri; Tapio Hämäläinen; Marjatta Raita; Marita Nordberg; Simo Salminen
- Distributed by: Spede-Team Oy
- Release date: August 26, 1988
- Running time: 1h 45 min
- Language: Finnish

Tupla-Uuno (English: Double Uuno) is a Finnish 1988 comedy film directed by Hannu Seikkula written by Spede Pasanen. It is the thirteenth film in the Uuno Turhapuro series.

The film was the most-watched domestic film of 1988, drawing almost 250,000 viewers, making it the fourth most-watched film of the year in Finland, after Who Framed Roger Rabbit, Fatal Attraction, and Crocodile Dundee II. Despite its success with audiences, the film did not receive a warm reception from critics. In a 1994 Video-opas, Bello Romano describes Tupla-Uuno as "predictable, standard Uuno fare" and awards it two stars out of five, corresponding to a rating of "mediocre."

== Plot ==
Uuno Turhapuro's (Vesa-Matti Loiri) father-in-law, Councillor Tuura (Tapio Hämäläinen), has decided to step down as CEO of his company to become its chairman. He instructs his executive team to begin the search for a new CEO for the Tuura Group. Sales Director Huttunen (Pekka Autiovuori) is involved with a gang planning to take over Tuura's company; he recommends a gangster named Seksström (Risto Aaltonen)—for whom all manner of credentials and documents have been forged—as the new CEO. Meanwhile, Uuno's friends Härski Hartikainen (Spede Pasanen) and Sörsselssön (Simo Salminen) run into a man who looks exactly like Uuno at a restaurant: Hugo Töttersberg (Vesa-Matti Loiri), a professor in multiple fields. They decide to use him to install Uuno as the company's new CEO; Hugo is disguised to resemble Uuno and sets off with Sörsselssön to get acquainted with the Tuura Group. Once there, posing as Uuno, Hugo examines the company's accounts and notices that something is amiss—a discovery that begins to unsettle the scheming gangsters. And Lydia (Caron Barnes), the beautiful foreign tourist who gets to know both Hugo and Uuno, is not quite what she appears to be on the surface, either.
