= About Seven Brothers =

About Seven Brothers Finnish: Noin seitsemän veljestä
- Poster
- Directed by: Jukka Virtanen
- Produced by: Spede Pasanen
- Starring: Juhani Kumpulainen; Spede Pasanen
- Narrated by: Martti Silvennoinen (uncredited); Ilkka Lipsanen
- Cinematography: Kari Sohlberg
- Edited by: Ossi Skurnik
- Music by: Jaakko Salo
- Distributed by: Finnkino Oy
- Release date: 23 August 1968
- Running time: 93 min.
- Country: Finland
- Language: Finnish

About Seven Brothers (Finnish: Noin seitsemän veljestä; also stylised as "Noin 7 Veljestä") is a 1968 comedy directed by Jukka Virtanen and which was written and produced by Spede Pasanen. The film is a loose parody of the Robin Hood story. The name of the film is a take on Seitsemän veljestä (The Seven Brothers) the ground-breaking novel by Finnish author Aleksis Kivi.

== Plot Synopsis ==
The film is set in a non-specific time in history. The land is ruled by the tyrannical Lord of the Castle, Von Wurtzburg, who taxes the citizens to a point where most can only afford to wear burlap sacks. Those unable to pay are executed. Robin Hood emerges to foil the Lord's cronies' attempts at terrorizing the citizens. He joins forces with Will Scarlet, whom he saves during his introduction, as well as Friar Tuck and Long John (a smaller version of Little John). Robin also encounters the inventor Leonardo when he shoots him down from the sky while Leonardo tests his flying machine. Leonardo escaped his beautiful but nagging wife and assists Robin with a number of inventions.

The film secondarily follows Sir Wilhelm, whose lands Von Wurtzburg wants. After failing to assassinate him, with traps set up by his henchman Iron Glove, he plans to wed Sir Wilhelm to his daughter, Helena, and murder him later. However, Robin Hood's gang manage to capture Von Wurtzburg's wife-to-be Venla as well as her dowry. The enraged Von Wurtzburg decides to have Sir Wilhelm masquerade as Robin Hood to capture the bandits. Sir Wilhelm is unsuccessful though, as Robin's gang imprison him, but is let loose by Venla. In the end, Sir Wilhelm returns to the castle, for some reason, with a map of where the dowry is hidden which the Lord claims (in the film, he claims to have stolen it but no scene in the film indicates this). In the meanwhile, Robin's gang trade Venla back for gold via a wench system developed by Leonardo.

Von Wurtzburg finds the hidden dowry and returns it to the castle. However, Will Scarlet hides in one of the chests and infiltrates the Lord's treasury. He fools the guards into opening the door and Robin's gang is able to clear out Von Wurtzburg's treasury. Scarlet, however, is captured during the escape attempt. When Scarlet is about to be executed by hanging, Robin swoops in to rescue him from the gallows and rides off only to discover that the bagged prisoner is actually Iron Glove. Robin and his crew end up captured one-by-one through failed break out attempts. Von Wurtzburg has Robin and Iron Glove fight in arm wrestling but eventually he decides to duel him man-to-man, albeit with Robin's hands tied to a poll behind his neck. Robin and his men make a daring escape.

Finally, Von Wurtzburg is about to marry Venla when the sympathetic Sir Wilhelm and Helena help Venla escape. Simultaneously, Robin's gang rally the peasants into an uprising as the Lord's soldiers head into the woods to look for the escaped Venla. A massive battle ensues, during which Leonardo is reunited with his wife while making a hot air balloon. He then flies over Von Wurtzburg's castle and drops an explosive, destroying the castle and bringing the fighting to an end. Venla winds up with Robin Hood and Von Wurtzburg, who has been led to believe Sir Wilhelm is just Hood in disguise, learns that Sir Wilhelm and his daughter have also fallen in love. The film ends with the now destitute Von Wurzburg working the fields.

== Cast ==
- Spede Pasanen as Sir Wilhem/Robin Hood
- Juhani Kumpulainen as Lord of the Castle Von Wurtzburg
- Simo Salminen as Mauno Munalukko (Magnus Padlock)
- Leo Jokela as Inventor Leonardo
- Ere Kokkonen as Pitkä-Jussi (Long John)
- Jukka Virtanen as Friar Tuck
- Pirkko Kankaanpää as Venla, Von Wurtzburg's wife-to-be
- Kaisu Vuoristo as Helena, Von Wurtzburg's daughter
- Helge Herala as Rautahanska (Iron Glove)
- Veikko Sinisalo as Takku

Pop-artist Ilkka Lipsanen, credited by his stage-name Danny, appears as a singing bard in-between major scenes to narrate the story in song-form. Vesa-Matti Loiri appears in a supporting role as one of Von Wurtzburg's guards. Model Seija Tyni who performed in the official advertisements for the gas-station chain Esso appears in a scene parodying the commercials.

== Production ==
Filming occurred mostly around Suomenlinna of Helsinki with St. Olaf's Castle of Savonlinna used for many wide-shots as a stand-in for the castle. The film's cast is composed of Pasanen's stock actors including Simo Salminen, Juhani Kumpulainen, Jukka Virtanen, Ere Kokkonen and Leo Jokela. It also featured the first major performance by Vesa-Matti Loiri in Spede's movies. Loiri previously acted as a child and had just graduated from acting college. Loiri and Spede would later go on to create the popular character Uuno Turhapuro.

Director Virtanen was also involved in a life-threatening accident during filming when he fell out of the hot-air balloon seen during the finale. Finnish pop-singer Danny and director Jukka Virtanen wrote the song Seitsemän kertaa seitsemän (Seven times Seven) to serve as the narrative of the movie, performed by Danny. Danny later released a stand-alone version with different lyrics which went on to become one of his most enduring hits.

== See also ==
- List of films and television series featuring Robin Hood
