= A Charming Mass Suicide (novel) =

Novel by Arto Paasilinna

- A Finnish book cover
- Author: Arto Paasilinna
- Original title: Finnish: Hurmaava joukkoitsemurha
- Language: Finnish
- Genre: comedy
- Publisher: WSOY
- Publication date: 1990
- Publication place: Finland
- Media type: Print (Hardback)
- Pages: 280
- ISBN: 951-0-16513-1
- OCLC: 1380932976

A Charming Mass Suicide (Finnish: Hurmaava joukkoitsemurha) is a 1990 Finnish satirical black comedy novel by Arto Paasilinna. It's a story about two suicidal men who, when they meet each other in their own intentions, decide together to form a "suicide association", which seeks as many suicide candidates as possible from all over Finland to carry out an apparent mass suicide with them. Once the group is finally together, they take a bus to tour around Europe with the intention of driving towards their final destination, where the mass suicide would eventually be carried out.

The book was adapted into a film by the same name in 2000, directed by Ere Kokkonen and starring Tom Pöysti and Heikki Kinnunen. Also, a South Korean musical based on the novel was made in 2009.
