= Uuno Turhapuro menettää muistinsa =

1982 Finnish film

- DVD cover of Uuno Turhapuro menettää muistinsa.
- Directed by: Ere Kokkonen
- Written by: Spede Pasanen
- Produced by: Spede Pasanen
- Starring: Vesa-Matti Loiri; Marjatta Raita; Spede Pasanen; Simo Salminen; Tapio Hämäläinen
- Distributed by: Spede-Production Oy (as Spede-Yhtiöt in film)
- Release date: 1982
- Running time: 1 h 27 min
- Country: Finland
- Language: Finnish

Uuno Turhapuro menettää muistinsa (Uuno Turhapuro Loses His Memory, also Numbskull Emptybrook Loses His Memory) is a Finnish 1982 comedy film written by Spede Pasanen and directed by Ere Kokkonen. It is the seventh film in the Uuno Turhapuro series.

== Plot ==
Councillor Tuura's (Tapio Hämäläinen) workday is ruined right from the morning, when everything he sees reminds him of his son-in-law, Uuno Turhapuro (Vesa-Matti Loiri), whom he deeply hates. Elisabeth Turhapuro (Marjatta Raita) is also tired of her husband Uuno once again and tries to divorce him, but since Uuno cannot cope with life alone, Elisabeth begins to train Unelma Säleikkö (Elli Castrén), Tuura's secretary, as new wife to Uuno. However, this goes wrong when Uuno and Sörsselssön (Simo Salminen) collide and hit their heads together. As a result of the collision, Uuno loses his memory and thinks he is a woman called "Unelma Säleikkö". Meanwhile Härski Hartikainen (Spede Pasanen), a friend of Uuno and Sörsselssön, is involved in a peace movement that would bring about permanent peace in the world with dynamite.

The plot of the film continues in the sequel Uuno Turhapuron muisti palailee pätkittäin.

== Reception ==
With over half a million viewers, the film is one of the best audience successes in the Turhapuro series, but it received a mixed reception from critics. For example, Antti Lindqvist of Kansan Uutiset considered the film to be "a calculated manipulation of attitudes made under the guise of fun, which, amidst ordinary comedy material, tries to make fun of people active in the peace movement", also referring in this context to the cartoons by political cartoonist Kari Suomalainen of Helsingin Sanomat that belittled and mocked the peace movement. Helena Ylänen of Helsingin Sanomat found the film unbalanced, but saw development in the main character: "The ugly duckling has become a swan. The loser has become a clown. The fallen man has found his heart."

== See also ==
- List of Finnish films of the 1980s
