= Body of Water (2011 film) =

2011 Finnish drama film

- Film poster
- Finnish: Syvälle salattu
- Directed by: Joona Tena
- Starring: Krista Kosonen; Kai Lehtinen
- Music by: Panu Aaltio
- Release date: 7 October 2011
- Running time: 105 minutes
- Country: Finland
- Language: Finnish

Body of Water (Finnish: Syvälle salattu, lit. 'Deep encrypted') is a 2011 Finnish drama film directed by Joona Tena.

== Cast ==
- Krista Kosonen as Julia
- Kai Lehtinen as Leo
- Viljami Nojonen as Niko
- Peter Franzén as Elias
- Risto Aaltonen as Lantto
- Kari Hietalahti as Koskela
- Ilkka Villi as Julia's ex-husband
