= Rautakauppias Uuno Turhapuro - presidentin vävy =

- DVD cover of Rautakauppias Uuno Turhapuro - presidentin vävy.
- Directed by: Ere Kokkonen
- Written by: Spede Pasanen
- Produced by: Spede Pasanen
- Starring: Vesa-Matti Loiri; Marjatta Raita; Marita Nordberg; Tapio Hämäläinen
- Distributed by: Spede-Production Oy (as Amusement Film Oy in film)
- Release date: 1978
- Running time: 1 h 30 min
- Country: Finland
- Language: Finnish

Rautakauppias Uuno Turhapuro - presidentin vävy (Hardware Dealer Uuno Turhapuro, the President's Son-in-Law, also Hardware Dealer Numbskull Emptybrook, the President's Son-in-Law) is a Finnish 1978 comedy film written by Spede Pasanen and directed by Ere Kokkonen. It is the fifth film in the Uuno Turhapuro series, and it is the last Uuno Turhapuro film in black and white.

The film's script is built on the basis of reheated sketches from the Spede Show, the most notable of which is the 13-minute "hardware store" sketch.

== Plot ==
Councillor Tuura (Tapio Hämäläinen) is his party's presidential candidate, but Tuura's lazy son-in-law Uuno (Vesa-Matti Loiri) threatens to mess up the whole campaign, so he needs to find a job. Tuura assigns Uuno to an aptitude test, and the result is surprising: Uuno is perfectly suited to become a hardware dealer (although Uuno is more unwilling to serve in this job). Tuura's rival Häppälä (Juhani Kumpulainen) sends the beautiful agent Unelma (Liisa Paatso) to ruin Uuno and Elisabeth's (Marjatta Raita) marriage, with the intention of causing a scandal for Tuura.
