= Olli Soinio =

Finnish film director, screenwriter, and film editor (1948–2018)

- Born: Olli Pekka Soinio; 27 November 1948; Helsinki, Finland
- Died: 29 November 2018 (aged 70); Porvoo, Finland
- Occupations: Film director, screenwriter, editor
- Years active: 1970–2018

Olli Pekka Soinio (27 November 1948 – 29 November 2018) was a Finnish film director, screenwriter, and film editor.

== Selected filmography as director ==
- Aidankaatajat eli heidän jälkeensä vedenpaisumus (1982)
- The Moonlight Sonata (1988)
- Legenda (1989)
- Moonlight Sonata II: The Street Sweepers (1991)
- Rolli: Amazing Tales (1991)
- Yötuuli (1992)
- Pako punaisten päämajasta (2000)
