= Lottovoittaja UKK Turhapuro =

- DVD cover.
- Directed by: Ere Kokkonen
- Written by: Spede Pasanen
- Produced by: Spede Pasanen
- Starring: Vesa-Matti Loiri; Marjatta Raita; Tapio Hämäläinen; Marita Nordberg; Spede Pasanen; Seppo Laine; Simo Salminen
- Distributed by: Funny-Films Oy
- Release date: 1976
- Running time: 1h 24 min
- Country: Finland
- Language: Finnish

Lottovoittaja UKK Turhapuro (English: Lottery Winner UKK Turhapuro) (Note: UKK being an apparent reference to former President of Finland Urho Kekkonen.) is a Finnish 1976 comedy film written by Spede Pasanen and directed by Ere Kokkonen. It is the third film in the Uuno Turhapuro series. The film is the first in the series to feature actors Tapio Hämäläinen and Marita Nordberg, who mainly play Uuno Turhapuro's parent-in-laws in the other films of the series.

The film was the second most successful Finnish film of 1976, behind only The Vacation, directed by Risto Jarva.

== Plot ==
It is the first anniversary of Uuno (Vesa-Matti Loiri) and Elisabet (Marjatta Raita). Uuno has placed a bet with his friend Härski-Hartikainen (Spede Pasanen) a year ago, that if Uuno can take just one year of marriage with Elisabet, Hartikainen will treat him a festive dinner. However, Hartikainen buys a lottery ticket for Uuno, who agrees to deduct it from his debt – and the festive dinner is reduced to a can of milk and half a sausage. As it happens, Uuno becomes the lottery winner of 1.5 million marks, only to soon realize he doesn't own a single penny yet. Mister Tossavainen (Seppo Laine) arrives and offers to finance Uuno before he actually gets the jackpot. Thus, Uuno gets to live a rich live on credit. He buys a raccoon fur, leopard swimming trunks and a couple of Mercedes-Benzes. Women begin to fancy Uuno and so does his father-in-law (Tapio Hämäläinen). As time goes by it is revealed, though, that Uuno is not actually a lottery winner, and so he has to escape the anger of others to Härski's car repair shop.
