= A Charming Mass Suicide (film) =

2000 Finnish film directed by Ere Kokkonen

- Original Finnish film poster
- Finnish: Hurmaava joukkoitsemurha
- Directed by: Ere Kokkonen
- Written by: Ere Kokkonen
- Based on: A Charming Mass Suicide by Arto Paasilinna
- Produced by: Anna-Maija Kokkonen
- Starring: Tom Pöysti; Heikki Kinnunen; Sari Siikander; Santeri Kinnunen; Heikki Nousiainen
- Cinematography: Jari Mutikainen
- Edited by: Pekka Lampela
- Music by: Olli Ahvenlahti
- Production company: Ere Kokkonen Oy
- Distributed by: Buena Vista International Finland Oy
- Release date: 3 March 2000 (Finland)
- Running time: 113 minutes
- Country: Finland
- Language: Finnish
- Budget: FIM 5.2 million

A Charming Mass Suicide (Finnish: Hurmaava joukkoitsemurha) is a 2000 Finnish black comedy film written and directed by Ere Kokkonen. The film stars Tom Pöysti, Heikki Kinnunen, Sari Siikander, Santeri Kinnunen and Heikki Nousiainen.

In addition to Finland, the film has also been shot in Norway, Germany, Switzerland, France and Spain. Director Kokkonen also filmed the film as an eight-part television series.

The film received a mixed reception from critics. Tv-maailma's review states that the "film laughs at Finnish national gloom as well as the desire to found the association, and the genre is stated to be mixed-strength opera buffa". Arto Pajukallio from Helsingin Sanomat stated that "the film's fun is mainly based on detached literary jokes, for which the actors cannot find an echo base".

== Plot ==
The film is based on Arto Paasilinna's 1990 novel of the same name, telling story about two men, who both have tried to commit a suicide, deciding to found a "Let's do it together"-suicide association to help the self-destructive people to succeed in their goal.

== Cast ==
- Tom Pöysti as Onni Rellonen
- Heikki Kinnunen as Colonel Hermanni Kemppainen
- Sari Siikander as Helena Puusaari
- Santeri Kinnunen as Seppo Sorjonen
- Heikki Nousiainen as Rauno Korpela
- Kristiina Halkola as Leena Mäki-Vaula
- Titta Jokinen as Hellevi Nikula
- Mira Kivilä as Elsa Taavitsainen
- Antti Litja as Jarl Hautala
- Vesa-Matti Loiri as Mikko Heikkinen
- Nora Lähteenmäki as Tarja Halttunen
- Eero Melasniemi as Jarmo Korvanen
- Juha Muje as Uula Lismanki
- Vesa Mäkelä as Hannes Jokinen
- Esko Nikkari as Sakari Piippo
- Eija Nousiainen as Lisbeth Korhonen
- Liisa Paatso as Aulikki Granstedt
- Ville-Veikko Salminen as Ermei Rankkala

There's also Risto Aaltonen, Risto Kaskilahti, Kiti Kokkonen, Seela Sella and Aarno Sulkanen appearing in smaller supporting roles.
