= Professori Uuno D.G. Turhapuro =

- DVD cover.
- Directed by: Ere Kokkonen
- Written by: Spede Pasanen
- Produced by: Spede Pasanen
- Starring: Vesa-Matti Loiri; Marjatta Raita; Spede Pasanen; Anja Pohjola; Pehr-Olof Sirén
- Distributed by: Filmituotanto Spede Pasanen Oy
- Release date: 1975
- Running time: 1h 22 min
- Language: Finnish

Professori Uuno D.G. Turhapuro is a Finnish 1975 comedy film written by Spede Pasanen and directed by Ere Kokkonen, and is the second film in the Uuno Turhapuro series.

== Plot ==
Uuno is unemployed and his friends try to arrange a job for him. With his imagination, though, and the help of Härski Hartikainen (Spede Pasanen), he somehow manages to avoid all work, until he becomes what he has always dreamt of being - a film star. Uuno's father-in-law has other plans for his occupation, though: since Uuno knows the Dandelion, he has potential for a professor of botany.
