= Uuno Turhapuro – This Is My Life =

- Promotional poster
- Directed by: Ere Kokkonen
- Written by: Ere Kokkonen
- Produced by: Anna-Maija Kokkonen
- Starring: Vesa-Matti Loiri; Marjatta Raita; Tapio Hämäläinen; Marita Nordberg
- Distributed by: Ere Kokkonen Oy
- Release date: 10 September 2004
- Running time: 100 min.
- Language: Finnish

Uuno Turhapuro – This Is My Life is a 2004 Finnish comedy film, made as a tribute to Spede Pasanen. It is the twentieth and last installment in the Uuno Turhapuro film series.

== Plot ==
Uuno disguises as an old man and infiltrates a nursing home for rich old people, where his father-in-law also lives. The ever-hungry Uuno is seduced by the table groaning with food, but as it happens, he never manages to be there at dinnertime.

Meanwhile, Sörsselssön enters Uuno for a TV competition named This Is My Life, where contestants tell about their life as viewers vote them either to continue or out of the show. The nursing home elderly watch on TV as Uuno tells the show's host his life story.

== Production ==
After Spede Pasanen died in 2001, a group led by Ere Kokkonen decided to make a final Turhapuro movie in remembrance of him. The plot is based on a common concept which Spede and Ere had of Uuno in a nursing home for the elderly. The film features much archival footage from prior entries in the series. Spede's character, Härski Hartikainen, appears exclusively through this material.

Many Finnish celebrities can be seen doing cameo roles, such as Danny, Mika Häkkinen, Tanja Karpela and Ben Zyskowicz.

The film was released in October 2004.
