= The Moonlight Sonata (film) =

- Original Finnish film poster
- Directed by: Olli Soinio
- Starring: Tiina Björkman; Kari Sorvali
- Release date: 4 November 1988
- Running time: 1 h 26 min
- Country: Finland
- Language: Finnish

The Moonlight Sonata (Finnish: Kuutamosonaatti) is a 1988 Finnish horror comedy film directed by Olli Soinio. The film won two Jussi Awards in 1989: Kari Sorvali for best male lead, and Matti Kuortti and Paul Jyrälä for best recording. The film was also nominated for Best Picture at the 1990 International Fantasy Film Award Festival.

In the film, a woman vacationing in Lapland encounters crazed hillbillies and has to survive in the wilderness.

The more comedic sequel to the film, Moonlight Sonata II: The Street Sweepers (Finnish: Kadunlakaisijat), was completed in 1991 and is also directed and written by Olli Soinio.

== Premise ==
A female fashion model Anni Stark (Tiina Björkman) takes leave from the fashion business and goes to Lapland for a vacation. Little does she know that there is a totally lunatic bunch of local hillbillies living in a nearby farmhouse. The plot thickens as one of the residents begins to harass Anni, who is left alone in the wilderness with only her dog to protect her.

== Cast ==
- Tiina Björkman - Anni Stark
- Kari Sorvali - Arvo Ilmari Johannes Kyyrölä
- Kim Gunell - Johannes
- Mikko Kivinen - Sulo Kyyrölä
- Ville-Veikko Salminen - Carli
- Soli Labbart - Äite Kyyrölä
- Risto Salmi - Motellin isäntä
- Toivo Tuomainen - Kauppias
