= Saatanan Radikaalit =

- Directed by: Paavo Piironen; Heikki Nousiainen; Heikki Huopainen; Timo Nissi
- Written by: Paavo Piironen; Heikki Nousiainen; Heikki Huopainen; Timo Nissi
- Produced by: Spede Pasanen
- Starring: Paavo Piironen; Heikki Nousiainen; Heikki Huopainen; Timo Nissi
- Narrated by: Leo Jokela
- Music by: Esa Helasvuo
- Distributed by: Finnkino, Mainostelevisio (MTV3) (Finland) (TV)
- Release date: 21 February 1971 (Kauhava)
- Running time: 71 min
- Country: Finland
- Language: Finnish
- Budget: FIM 190,000

Saatanan Radikaalit ('Damned Radicals') is a 1971 Finnish comedy film starring and directed by Paavo Piironen, Heikki Nousiainen, Heikki Huopainen and Timo Nissi. It was financed and produced by Finnish film-maker Spede Pasanen, but unlike the comedy films he had produced previously he did not feature him on-screen. The movie was released in 1971, the same year as Spede's Hirttämättömät and Kahdeksas Veljes. The film was intended to give its four stars a start in the Finnish film industry as both directors and leading actors.

Although now widely available in DVD distribution in various Spede collections, the film's only other showing outside its theatrical run was a single TV rerun on MTV3 in 2008.

== Plot ==
Four Finns Paavo, Hese, Viiksi and Timppa are enjoying themselves too much in Hell (Hell being depicted as a Finnish sauna), so Perkele and Satan send them back to Finland for a vacation. They're given a suitcase full of money and (unbeknownst to them) are made incapable of becoming drunk. On their way out of hell, they steal a car and pick up enough hitchhikers to alert the police. When the quartet escape the scene, however, they leave their money behind. Next, they attempt to earn money by various illegal means, including a bank-robbery which lands Hese in jail.

The boys manage to break Hese out of jail but are left with nothing to their name. Eventually they plot to steal heat-resistant suits which they plan to sell to people of other nationalities back in Hell, who can't stand the heat. They are successful although the military deployment leads to chaos and citywide destruction. When they return to Hell, Satan forces them to wear the heat-resistant clothing as a punishment and for his own amusement.

== Cast ==
- Paavo Piironen as Paavo
- Heikki Nousiainen as Hese
- Heikki Huopainen as Viiksi
- Timo Nissi as Timppa
- Yrjö Järvinen as Perkele (the lesser devil)
- Heikki Savolainen as Satan
- Leo Jokela as the Narrator
- Ville-Veikko Salminen as the clothes-shop salesman

== Background ==
The film was unconventional from Spede at the time, not featuring him in either a starring role or in the writing crew. The film's title is a pun. Literally translated the title means "Satan's Radicals". Saatana is a swear word in Finnish similar in meaning to "God damn it", so the title holds a double meaning as the four characters (referred to twice in the film as radicals) are from and of Satan, as well as literally from Hell.

Leo Jokela, seen in many prior Spede comedies serves as the film's initial narrator and types out the film's credits, jokingly referring to the fact that he doesn't play a role in the film since it would have cost the producer too much.

In 1971, all of Spede's movies were box-office disappointments which led to him taking a two-year hiatus from film-making. Despite this, Spede won a producer's Jussi Award for the film, jointly with Hirttämättömät and Kahdeksas Veljes.
