= Hanski =

Hanski is a surname. Notable people with the surname include:

- Anna Hanski (born 1970), Finnish singer
- Eino Hanski (1928–2000), Finnish writer, dramatist, and sculptor
- Ilkka Hanski (1953–2016), Finnish ecologist
- Vesa Hanski (born 1973), Finnish swimmer
