= Uuno Turhapuro armeijan leivissä =

- DVD cover with Uuno leaning against an ancient gun
- Directed by: Ere Kokkonen
- Written by: Ere Kokkonen
- Produced by: Spede Pasanen
- Starring: Vesa-Matti Loiri; Marjatta Raita; Tapio Hämäläinen; Marita Nordberg; Spede Pasanen; Simo Salminen
- Distributed by: Filmituotanto Spede Pasanen Ky
- Release date: 1984
- Running time: 1h 42min
- Language: Finnish

Uuno Turhapuro armeijan leivissä (Uuno Turhapuro in the Army) is a 1984 Finnish comedy and the ninth film in the Uuno Turhapuro film series starring Vesa-Matti Loiri as the title character, Spede Pasanen as the potty-mouthed mechanic Härski Hartikainen, and Simo Salminen as their constant companion Sörsselssön. It is to date the highest-grossing Finnish comedy and not too surprisingly the most well known in the Turhapuro series. It remains Finland's most seen domestic film made since 1968. However, the official statistics by the Finnish Film Foundation began in 1972, so all figures before that are estimates (although believed to be true). Thus this film is the most seen domestic film in the years with official statistical records (1972 - today), and 7th in the Top 20 of all time.

== Plot ==
Uuno is forced to complete his mandatory military service when it is revealed that he only spent one day in the army in his youth. As is typical of the Turhapuro series, his family and friends become closely tied in with these events. His friends Härski Hartikainen and Sörsselssön return to the army for a refresher course and by chance Uuno's father-in-law, Councillor Tuura is made the Finnish Defence Minister. As Uuno's superiors in the army learn of the high position of his father-in-law, they incorrectly deduce that Uuno has been sent to seek flaws in the leadership and conduct of the army. They try to bribe the completely oblivious Uuno with promotions to have him keep his mouth shut. Within one week, Uuno has been promoted from private to major.

In one of the most memorable scenes, Uuno's wife, Elisabeth, dresses as Uuno and substitutes him for a day as Uuno has an apparently urgent meeting (at a restaurant) and while becoming lost in the woods with a malfunctioning radio, Tuura accidentally declares war on Sweden, causing him to be court-martialed with Uuno as his defense attorney.
