= Uuno Turhapuro =

Finnish fictional comedy character

- Uuno Turhapuro films character
- Uuno Turhapuro played by Vesa-Matti Loiri in the 1985 film Uuno Epsanjassa.
- First appearance: Uuno Turhapuro (1973)
- Last appearance: Uuno Turhapuro – This Is My Life (2004)
- Created by: Spede Pasanen
- Portrayed by: Vesa-Matti Loiri

In-universe information
- Species: Human
- Gender: Male
- Family: Hugo Turhapuro (father); Gunhild Donnerstotter (mother); George Turhapuro (twin brother); Tarmo Turhapuro (brother); Jeremias Peni (younger brother)
- Spouse: Elisabeth Turhapuro (née Tuura)
- Relatives: Councillor Tuura (father-in-law); Reetta Tuura (mother-in-law)
- Nationality: Finnish

Uuno Turhapuro is a Finnish comedy character and antihero created by Spede Pasanen and played by Vesa-Matti Loiri. Originally appearing in Spede Show during 1971–1973, the character gained popularity through the Uuno Turhapuro films.

== History ==
=== Birth of the character ===
Spede Pasanen originally had the idea for the Uuno Turhapuro character when the first lottery draw of the Finnish company Veikkaus had been shown on Finnish television in January 1971. Pasanen designed a new sketch for his show Spede Show about a couple arguing about how to invest their lottery winnings even before the actual lottery draw. Pasanen had earlier thought of characteristics including laziness and an ability to explain matters for the character of the husband several years ago. The character of the wife was played by veteran Spede Show actress Marjatta Raita, and for the husband, Pasanen chose Vesa-Matti Loiri who had appeared in Pasanen's films and sketch comedy shows since 1968.

=== First sketches ===
The specific date of the first sketch played by Loiri and Raita in early 1971 has been forgotten, as Mainostelevisio had a habit of reusing video reels to record new material for economy reasons. The sketch was replayed on 12 September 1971. In this first sketch Loiri's then-unnamed character was cleanly dressed in a white polo shirt and he did not yet have his trademark theatrical makeup. The character's habit of explaining things and his stream of consciousness is close to the character of Uuno Turhapuro which was invented later. The first sketch got a good reception, so Pasanen wrote new sketches for the same characters, where they would argue about unpaid phone bills, degrees received by distance education and filling their refrigerator with meat.

=== Name ===
At first, the couple in the sketch did not have established names. Marjatta Raita explained that the reason for this was that no one could remember which names were used the last time. Pasanen had first named the male character as Usko, but soon renamed him to Uuno, which has a connotation of a fool. During his studies at the Kuopio Lyceum High School, Pasanen had had a strict German language teacher called Uuno Hiltunen, although Pasanen never directly admitted having named his character after him. The surname Turhapuro (literally "futile brook" or "pointless brook") described the character's uselessness and puniness and resembled the name of the lead character of Pasanen's 1971 film Kahdeksas veljes, named Tässäpuro.

In the first Uuno film Uuno Turhapuro the character's middle name is revealed to be Eero. In the second Turhapuro film Professori Uuno D. G. Turhapuro (1975) his middle names are said to be Daavid Goljat. In the third film Lottovoittaja UKK Turhapuro (1976) Uuno changes his given names to Uuno Kaavit Koljat in order to get the initials UKK resembling former President of Finland Urho Kaleva Kekkonen.

Uuno refers to himself as "Director Uuno Turhapuro", even though he really is only working in short-timed, low-paying jobs or is entirely unemployed. In the film Uunon huikeat poikamiesvuodet maaseudulla (1990) it is revealed that Uuno's father referred to his son as Uuno Turhapuro already before he was born, and in the first Uuno film Uuno tells Härski Hartikainen he attended leadership school by distance education.

When Pasanen took the Turhapuro films abroad in the 1980s, he translated the character's name to English as Numbskull Emptybrook or Pointlessbrook, and to French as Bébert Bocal. The Swedish and German translations used the original Finnish name.

== Dramatis personae ==
Uuno Daavid Goljat Turhapuro is a ragged man, characterised by his tattered string vest, sparse row of teeth and untidy face, perhaps depicting a Finnish stereotype of a loser. Vesa-Matti Loiri, who played the character, has said that the look of Uuno was born when he was trying to get the impression of a "clown on the personal decline". One of Uuno's personalities are that he tries to avoid working until the very end, and to emphasize that, he uses his ability to explain himself out of unpleasant situations, which is why he is unofficially titled as the "world championship of explaining" by his wife. Uuno possibly also has a very big ego; he considers himself a born "leader" and, before his marriage, also the "most desirable bachelor in Helsinki" (Lottovoittaja UKK Turhapuro, 1976).

Uuno's wife Elisabeth Turhapuro (played by Marjatta Raita) is the daughter of rich industrialist Councillor Tuura (Tapio Hämäläinen). In the beginning of the first film (Uuno Turhapuro, 1973), in the couple's wedding, Uuno is tidy and cleanly, but gets ragged and lazy immediately after marrying a rich woman. Uuno's main pastime is lying on the couch, overeating, and acquiring his father-in-law's money. His biggest virtue is his gift of gab that he uses in settling marital problems, cadging free hot dogs from the stand and seducing other women. Sometimes Uuno also has a bad habit of humiliating his wife or being otherwise just chauvinistic. This has been considered a reflection of Spede Pasanen, who created the film series, his own worldview, which has been classified as both chauvinistic and misogynistic over the years.

The conventional plot of the films is based on the tension between Uuno and his father-in-law: the mining executive Councillor Tuura, disgusted by his dirty son-in-law, faces constant misfortune on his career, when Uuno pops up in the wrong places. Because of that, Tuura has tried several times to undermine the marriage of his daughter and Uuno (Uuno Turhapuron aviokriisi, 1981), but often with bad results. When Tuura, just appointed as defence minister, orders Uuno into the army (Uuno Turhapuro armeijan leivissä, 1984), he attains the rank of major in a couple of days. When Tuura takes part in the presidential election (Uuno Turhapuro – herra Helsingin herra, 1991), Uuno becomes President of Finland by accident, ending up enjoying the luxury afforded by his new position (Uuno Turhapuro – Suomen tasavallan herra presidentti, 1992). Uuno's regular helpers are his auto mechanic friends Härski-Hartikainen (Spede Pasanen) and Sörsselssön (Simo Salminen), who help Uuno mainly because he has promised them a small share of Tuura's possible heritage. The films also contain numerous cameo appearances by Finnish politicians and celebrities, often as themselves.

A total of twenty Uuno Turhapuro films were made between 1973–2004. Originally there were plans for only one film, but due to its success, the film got 19 sequels. The two latest Uuno films are directed, produced and written by Ere Kokkonen. The Uuno Turhapuro films have never been praised by critics; in general, the reason was that the films were made mainly for money, and quality was not always main reason, and sometimes the films have been criticized for intervention the thread of the plot, the end result mostly looking like a "collection of sketches". Despite the harsh criticism, the Uuno Turhapuro films have been favorites of the audience. The most popular Uuno film is Uuno Turhapuro armeijan leivissä (1984), seen by more than 700,000 people in the theatres – an impressive figure in a country of 4.9 million inhabitants. It remains Finland's most seen domestic film made since 1968.

== Uuno Turhapuro films ==
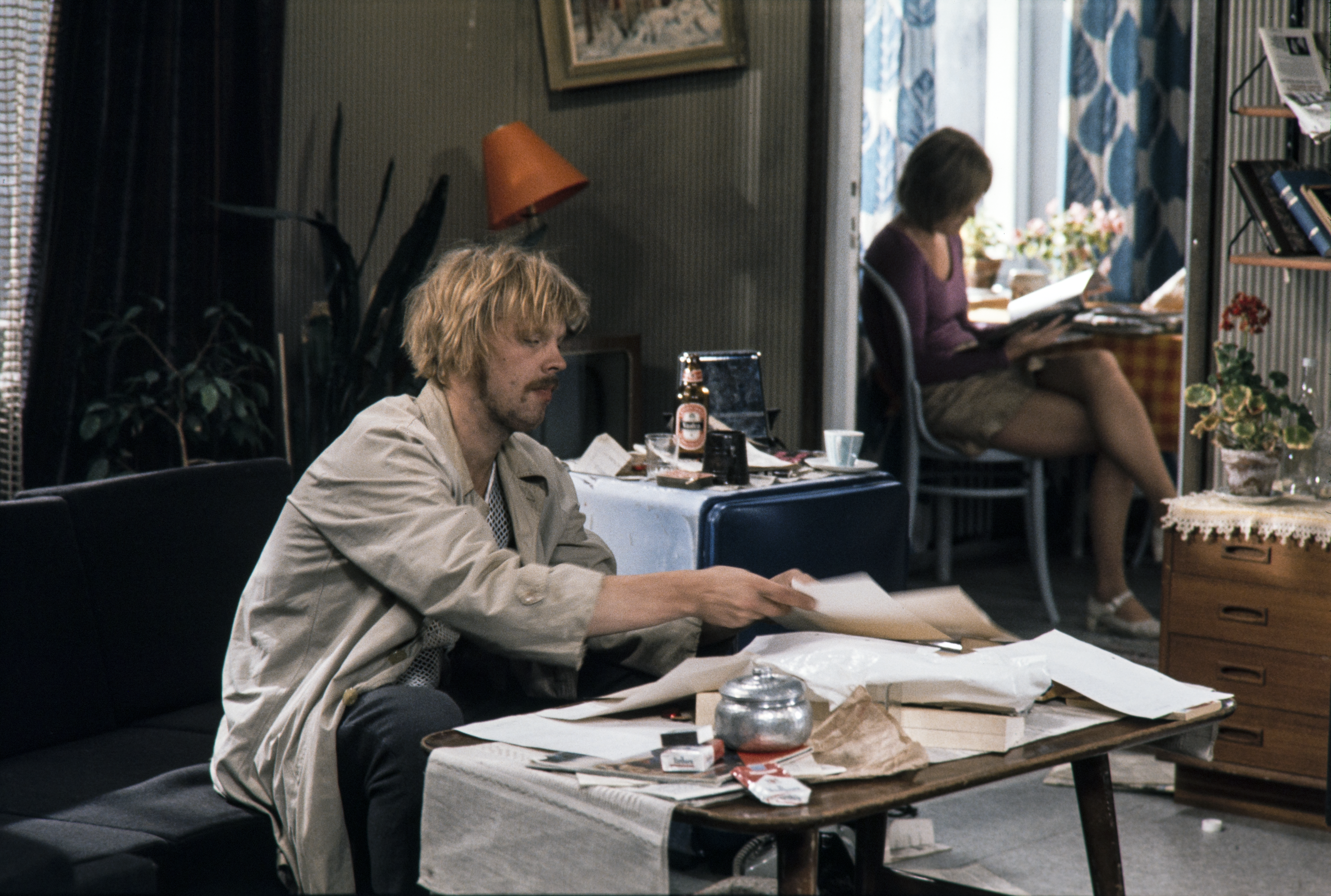
The shootings of the first Uuno Turhapuro film in Helsinki in July 1973. Actor Vesa-Matti Loiri with actress Marjatta Raita in the background

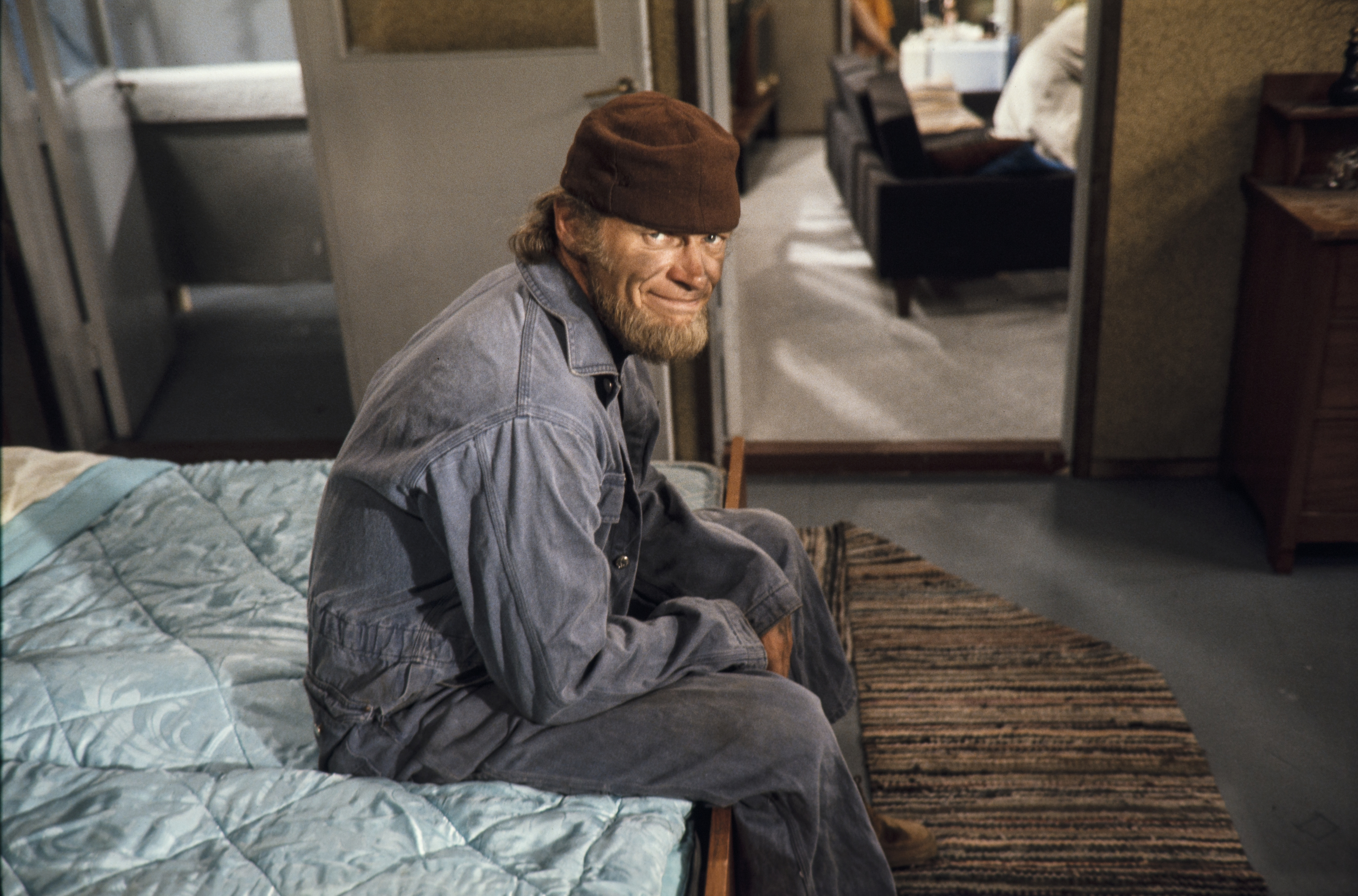
Spede Pasanen as Härski Hartikainen in the film set of the first Uuno Turhapuro film (1973)

- Uuno Turhapuro (1973)
- Professori Uuno D.G. Turhapuro (1975)
- Lottovoittaja UKK Turhapuro (1976)
- Häpy Endkö? Eli kuinka Uuno Turhapuro sai niin kauniin ja rikkaan vaimon (1977)
- Rautakauppias Uuno Turhapuro – presidentin vävy (1978)
- Uuno Turhapuron aviokriisi (1981)
- Uuno Turhapuro menettää muistinsa (1982)
- Uuno Turhapuron muisti palailee pätkittäin (1983)
- Uuno Turhapuro armeijan leivissä (1984)
- Uuno Epsanjassa (1985)
- Uuno Turhapuro muuttaa maalle (1986)
- Uuno Turhapuro – kaksoisagentti (1987)
- Tupla-Uuno (1988)
- Uunon huikeat poikamiesvuodet maaseudulla (1990)
- Uuno Turhapuro herra Helsingin herra (1991)
- Uuno Turhapuro – Suomen tasavallan herra presidentti (1992)
- Uuno Turhapuron poika (1994)
- Johtaja Uuno Turhapuro – pisnismies (1998)
- Uuno Turhapuro – This Is My Life (2004) (A tribute film to Spede Pasanen, who died in 2001)

=== Other film appearances ===
- Koeputkiaikuinen ja Simon enkelit (1979)
- Tup akka lakko (1980)
- Vääpeli Körmy ja vetenalaiset vehkeet (1991)

=== TV series ===
- Uuno Turhapuro armeijan leivissä (1986) (The film as a seven-part, extended TV series)
- Uuno Turhapuro (televisiosarja) (1996)
- Johtaja Uuno Turhapuro – pisnismies (1999) (The film as a five-part, extended TV series)
- Uuno Turhapuro – This is my Life (2006) (The film as a five-part, extended TV series)

=== CD-music ===
- Uuno on numero yksi! (2003) (Film score contains music from Uuno Turhapuro films 1973-1998)

=== Unofficial films ===
- Uuno Turhapuron veli (1994) (Note: Uuno Turhapuro is not seen in this film. Spede was having a falling-out with Loiri, and so Loiri wouldn't act in it. Later Spede considered the film a mistake, and has commented it by saying "forget the whole film".)

=== Other related products ===
- Uuno Turhapuro muuttaa maalle (1986) (a game for the Commodore 64 home computer, based on the movie with the same name)

== See also ==
- Cinema of Finland
- List of feature film series with 11 to 20 entries
