= Funny-Films =

Finnish film production company

Funny-Films Oy was a Finnish film production company established by Spede Pasanen.

== Information ==
The company produced three Uuno Turhapuro films and a few other Spede films in 1976, 1979–1981 and 1986. Pasanen sold Funny-Films to MTV3, which re-established it in 1995 to produce several TV series for MTV3 and SubTV. In 2002, Funny-Films was bought by Oy Filmiteollisuus Fine Ab. Osku Pajamäki is the Managing Director of Funny-Films Oy. Funny Films Ltd. is part of the Yellow Film & TV Group, and it is Finland's largest privately owned and operated production group. Yellow Film & TV Group has other subsidiaries that include Filmiteollisuus Oy, Helsinki Film, Ten Years Production libraries of books.

== Works ==
Funny-Films Oy is known for its productions of the following:

- Television programs
- Commercials
- Corporate videos
- Solutions for businesses and communities who want to utilize video in new media fields
