= Pähkähullu Suomi =

- DVD cover
- Directed by: Jukka Virtanen
- Written by: Spede Pasanen; Ere Kokkonen, Jukka Virtanen
- Produced by: Spede Pasanen
- Starring: [Spede Pasanen; Simo Salminen, Esko Salminen, Leo Jokela
- Distributed by: Filmituotanto Spede Pasanen Ky
- Release date: 1967
- Running time: 1 h 24 min
- Language: Finnish

Pähkähullu Suomi (Crazy Finland) is a 1967 comedy by Spede Pasanen. It is the third film starring Spede in a contemporary comedy after X-Paroni and Millipilleri. The film's release coincided with the 50th anniversary of the Finnish declaration of independence which is also referenced in the film.

== Plot summary ==
The film is set to a frame-narrative about a film director and producer making a marketing film about Finland, using the visit of the son of a wealthy hair-creme tycoon, William Njurmi (Pasanen), as the premise. For the first two thirds, the film's events take place according to a conversation between the producer, director and a random Finnish tax-payer frozen by the narrator at the beginning of the film. William Njurmi, born and raised in the US, is visiting the home of his ancestors who were Finnish. After an expansive tour and excessive time spent at a sauna Njurmi escapes the Finnish welcoming committee, runs into the woods and gets mistaken for a deer. He also walks in on an exercise held by the Finnish Armed Forces.

Later, Njurmi runs into an inventor living in the woods (played by Spede's frequent collaborator Simo Salminen) named Simo. After Njurmi is almost forced to marry a farm-girl by her redneck in-laws he is saved by Simo. Though Njurmi is open about his identity Simo remains in disbelief until Njurmi returns to the Commerce Council but not before the pair steal a car and tour the country, effectively covering every tourist location in Finland.

Becoming fed up with the Commerce Council Njurmi replaces himself with his body-guard, a stereotypical Italian mobster named Luigi (Esko Salminen) with full rights to use Njurmi's name and wealth whilst he and Simo continue to go about Finland unrecognised. It is at this point that the director and producer from the beginning of the film, removing their wigs and revealing themselves to be bald, turn out to be undercover agents for a party that is never identified during the film. Meanwhile, Luigi is constantly harassed by the Finnish Commerce Council who are trying to get a sizable donation often pleading pitifully. Eventually Luigi gives them a check but not before he has seen traditional Finnish winter-sports and dated the Miss Finland. Eventually Luigi is caught double-timing by his wife effectively terminating his role from the rest of the film.

The film itself ends with Will and Simo being chased by the agents and fighting them off as they do. The chase ends at the Olympic Stadium in Helsinki where after Njurmi and Simo fight off dozens of agents Njurmi decides to marry a Finnish girl who just conveniently shows up. However the woman is also an agent, revealed when she removes her wig too. Afterwards Simo runs into the scene where Luigi had dumped Miss Finland into a swimming pool when his wife showed up. Simo then breaks the fourth wall by talking to the narrator asking "What the heck is going on?". He is then given a very brief and somewhat inaccurate explanation of the plot. However, Simo seems to have no trouble understanding and after saving Miss Finland from the swimming pool, he tells her they will go off to get married. The movie ends with Simo winking at the camera as the frame freezes and the words "Happy End" appear on screen.

== Production ==
The film was Spede's second to be directed by Jukka Virtanen, with him also playing the role of the secret agent pretending to be a film-director within the film, and the second written co-operatively between Pasanen, Virtanen and Ere Kokkonen. Kokkonen also plays the role as his cohort pretending to be a film producer. Recurring actors from Spede's previous films include Simo Salminen, Marita Nordberg and Leo Jokela.
