= Uuno Epsanjassa =

- DVD cover of Uuno Epsanjassa.
- Directed by: Ere Kokkonen
- Written by: Ere Kokkonen
- Produced by: Spede Pasanen
- Starring: Vesa-Matti Loiri; Marjatta Raita; Tapio Hämäläinen; Marita Nordberg
- Distributed by: Filmituotanto Spede Pasanen Ky
- Release date: 1985
- Running time: 1h 45 min
- Language: Finnish

Uuno Epsanjassa (an intentional misspelling of "Uuno in Spain") is a Finnish 1985 comedy film directed by Ere Kokkonen. It is the tenth film in the Uuno Turhapuro series. It was seen by more than 600,000 people in the theatres, making it the third highest-grossing film in the series; the film was an even bigger success than Rauni Mollberg's The Unknown Soldier, which came out the same year.

== Production ==
The idea for the film came during the winter of 1984-1985 during the shooting of the earlier film Hei kliffaa hei when sound recorder Pekka Lampela complained to director Ere Kokkonen that it was always freezing cold when shooting a film. Kokkonen promised Lampela that he would not freeze during the shooting of the next film, and got the idea to shoot a new Uuno Turhapuro film in Spain.

Actor Sean Connery was playing on the same golf course while shooting the golf scene in the film. The working group thought of inviting him into the film for a small cameo role, but in the end none of the members of the working group wanted to invite the "great legend" into the film (although Ere Kokkonen later mentions in his memoirs that despite the request, Connery would have politely refused the cameo role). In 2015, Vesa-Matti Loiri recalled the same situation and said this:

- Think of the situation where the golfball is placed in a low tree, between the branches. The guys are setting up the cameras and Pappa Jyrälä is looking for a recording location, and it's so damn hot and tiring and its a little annoying. I'm standing in a full Turhapuro mask, and the sun was so hot that even the squares of the net shirt burned into the skin. I see three big players walking by, and one of them stops to look and ask: you're making a movie? I say with a frown is it look like it. Then it goes away of course and I realize it's Sean Connery. Damn it. There was nothing diva in it, he kindly asked about it. I behaved stupidly and lost perhaps an interesting conversation.

In bullfight scene, at first they tried to use a local actor in the role of Uuno but he wasn't funny enough, so Vesa-Matti Loiri decided to try it himself. The film also features Loiri's Nasse-setä character and the invention of the sports car drivers from Pori, the "two-spoke car". The film was shot at the Hotel Del Golf in Marbella.

== Plot ==
Uuno Turhapuro (played by Vesa-Matti Loiri) is searching for a job and takes a correspondence course in tour guiding. Eventually he gets a job in a small travel agency and takes a group of Finnish tourists to Marbella, Spain. Unfortunately Uuno's father-in-law Tuura (Tapio Hämäläinen) is in the group, too, with his wife (Marita Nordberg) and daughter, Uuno's wife Elisabet (Marjatta Raita). Tuura tries to get a signature to an important paper from a minister who's having a holiday in the area. Meanwhile, Uuno just relaxes and enjoys the sun.

== Reception ==
Helena Ylänen, a film critic for the newspaper Helsingin Sanomat, said Uuno Epsanjassa was "the most boring Uuno Turhapuro film for as long as I can remember": "[It] does not contain any funny and clever idea, that so far had always been present even in the worst Uuno Turhapuro films, at least one moment to show all this time had not gone to waste. The text is a kind of half-funny babble. Uuno's cleverness is at half of that when he was recently married, at the most."

Aune Kämäräinen for the newspaper Uusi Suomi agreed with Ylänen: "For some reason this Uuno Turhapuro film feels more boring and repetitive than the last two or three films. -- There are few jokes and they don't compare even to the sketches on Spede's TV show. The strange contraptions that the main audience of the Uuno Turhapuro films, 10-year-old children, have liked, now amount to one two-spoke car. The appearance of the drunken babysitter Nasse-setä seems forced and is completely tasteless."

Kari Kellokumpu for the newspaper Lapin Kansa also disliked the film but thought that "maybe its popularity is based more on the mentality of Finnish society, to its way of appreciating things. In a Lutheran workaholic Finland Uuno gives us the freedom to be lazy, worthless bums. Oh, to be able not to worry about money, oh, to be able to skip straightening your necktie, and what's worst, your neighbour just got a new car and an electric toothbrush."

In the work Video-opas from 1994 Ilkka Jauhiainen says the change in the environment was good for the Uuno Turhapuro character so he gave the film two stars out of five, which amounts for the grade of "average".

== Miscellaneous ==
"Epsanjassa" is humorous misspelling of the word "Espanjassa" (in Spain) that imitates uneducated spelling error.
