= Ere Kokkonen =

Finnish film director and screenwriter (1938–2008)

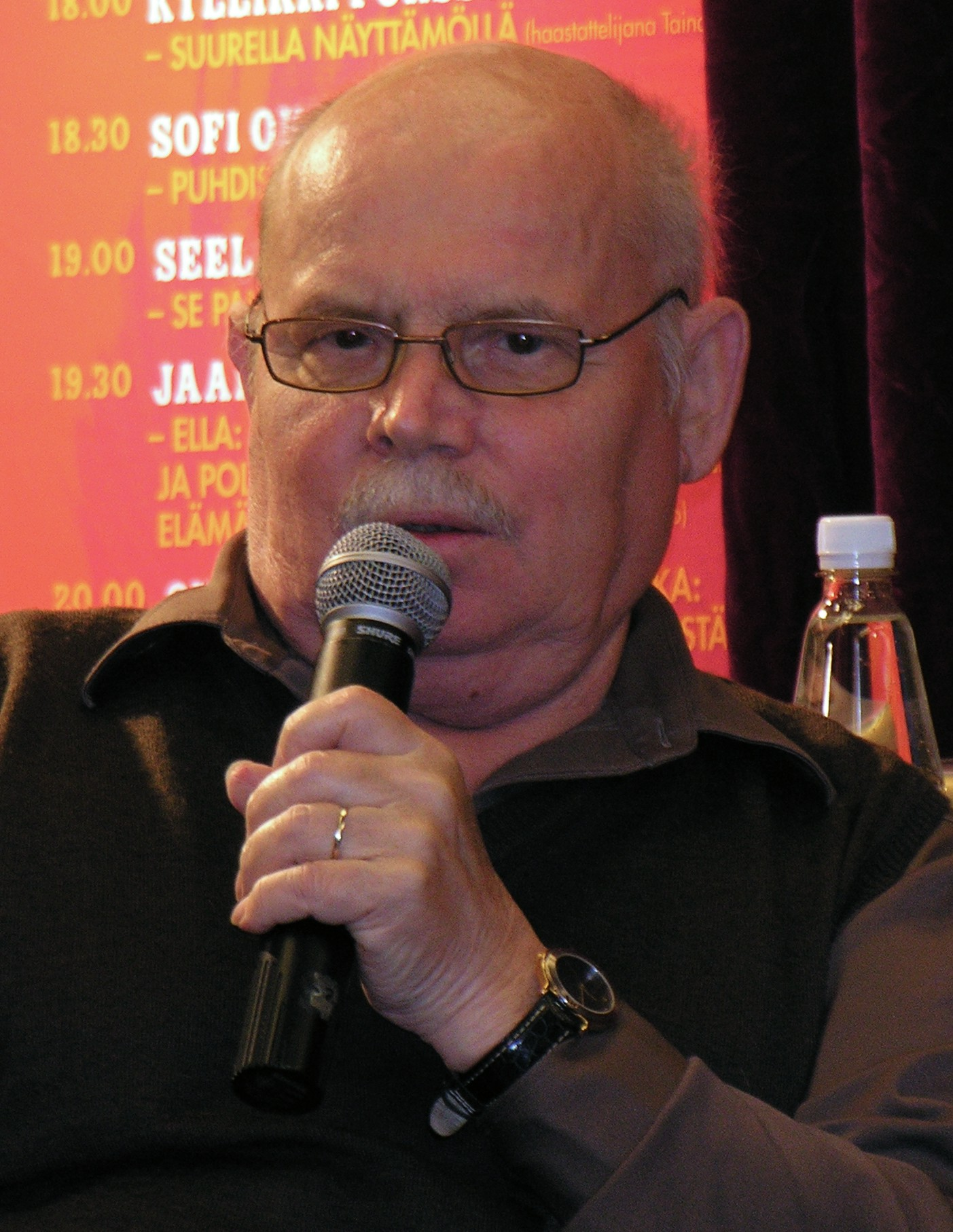
- Ere Kokkonen in 2008.
- Born: Erkki Olavi Kokkonen; 7 July 1938; Savonlinna, Finland
- Died: 16 October 2008 (aged 70); Helsinki, Finland
- Occupations: Director, screenwriter
- Years active: 1960-2004
- Awards: Special Telvis; 2002

Erkki Olavi "Ere" Kokkonen (7 July 1938 – 16 October 2008), born in Savonlinna, was a Finnish film director and screenwriter.

== Biography ==
He worked closely with Spede Pasanen all the way from the 1960s until Spede's death, as a director, writer and also an actor. Kokkonen's feature film debut was Millipilleri (1966), co-directed with Spede Pasanen and Jukka Virtanen.

In later decades, when Turhapuro films were made less frequently, Kokkonen scripted and directed the Vääpeli Körmy series of films His career as a director also includes filming of Arto Paasilinna's books, including The Ten Graters and A Charming Mass Suicide.

Kokkonen worked for both YLE and MTV3, where he served as entertainment director from 1974 to 1984. Kokkonen was the founder of the Comedy Theater Arena in 1995. He was the theatre's artistic director, director and screenwriter for most of the theater's performances. His wife Anna-Maija Kokkonen is the CEO of Arena. With his ex-wife Titta Jokinen, Kokkonen has daughter Kiti Kokkonen who is an actress.

In 1991 Ere Kokkonen founded a film production company, Ere Kokkonen Oy, which is still working.

In 2007 he wrote his memoirs, titled Memories return in Fragments.

Kokkonen died at the age of 70 in 2008 after a prolonged illness.

== Awards ==
Kokkonen was awarded the Special Telvis award in February 2002.

== Filmography ==
Director, writer or actor

- Millipilleri (1966)
- Pähkähullu Suomi (1967)
- Noin seitsemän veljestä (1968)
- Näköradiomiehen ihmeelliset siekailut (1969)
- Leikkikalugangsteri (1969)
- Pohjan tähteet (1969)
- Jussi Pussi (1970)
- Speedy Gonzales - Noin 7 veljeksen poika (1970)
- Kahdeksas veljes (1971)
- Uuno Turhapuro (1973)
- Viu-hah hah-taja (1974)
- Professori Uuno D.G. Turhapuro (1975)
- Lottovoittaja UKK Turhapuro (1976)
- Häpy Endkö? Eli kuinka Uuno Turhapuro sai niin kauniin ja rikkaan vaimon (1977)
- Rautakauppias Uuno Turhapuro – presidentin vävy (1978)
- Uuno Turhapuron aviokriisi (1981)
- Uuno Turhapuro menettää muistinsa (1982)
- Uuno Turhapuron muisti palailee pätkittäin (1983)
- Uuno Turhapuro armeijan leivissä (1984)
- Hei kliffaa hei (1985)
- Uuno Epsanjassa (1985)
- Uuno Turhapuro muuttaa maalle (1986)
- Liian iso keikka (1986)
- Pikkupojat (1986)
- Vääpeli Körmy ja marsalkan sauva (1990)
- Uuno Turhapuro – herra Helsingin herra (1991)
- Vääpeli Körmy ja vetenalaiset vehkeet (1991)
- Uuno Turhapuro – Suomen tasavallan herra presidentti (1992)
- Vääpeli Körmy ja etelän hetelmät (1992)
- Vääpeli Körmy: Taisteluni – Min Kampp (1994)
- Elämä lyhyt, Rytkönen pitkä (1996)
- Vääpeli Körmy ja kahtesti laukeava (1997)
- Johtaja Uuno Turhapuro – pisnismies (1998)
- Hurmaava joukkoitsemurha (2000)
- Kymmenen riivinrautaa (2002)
- Uuno Turhapuro – This Is My Life (2004)
