= Simo Salminen =

Finnish comedian and actor

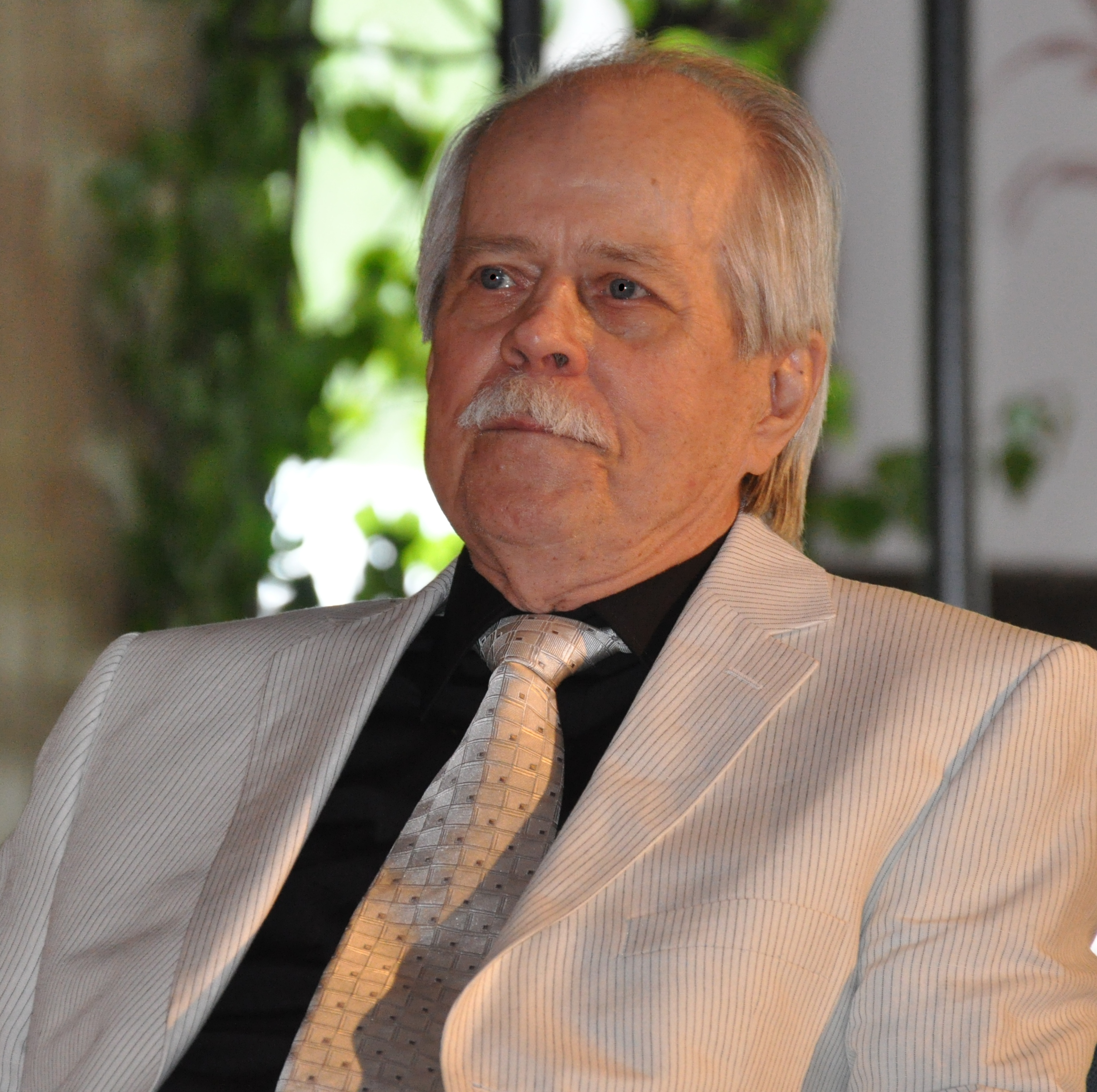
- Salminen in 2010
- Born: Simo Veli Atte Salminen; 8 November 1932; Vanaja, Finland
- Died: 2 September 2015 (aged 82); Salo, Finland

Simo Veli Atte Salminen (8 November 1932 – 2 September 2015) was a Finnish comic-actor best known for his many performances in movies and television shows by Spede Pasanen, usually playing his sidekick in some fashion.

Salminen alongside Vesa-Matti Loiri and Pasanen himself were the three important players in almost all of Pasanen's productions. He frequently played a supporting or at the very least a relevant secondary character in many of Pasanen's films, usually the bungling assistant to the main character (often portrayed by Pasanen). His characters were frequently also called "Simo" (such as in Pähkähullu Suomi, Koeputkiaikuinen ja Simon enkelit). Salminen is best remembered for the role of the luckless mechanic Sörselssön, working at an auto-repair shop with the foul-mouthed Härski Hartikainen (Pasanen) in the Uuno Turhapuro film series.

Jukka Virtanen, director of Millipilleri and Noin 7 Veljestä, has said of Salminen that he complimented Spede on-screen by being naturally funny and without stealing the spotlight.

== Other ventures ==
Prior to becoming one of Pasanen's regular actors he was the Clown diving champion of Finland. He originally trained as a pastry chef, an occupation he practiced for 20 years between 1947-1967, before choosing to focus entirely on the entertainment industry.

Salminen ran his own restaurant for a short period in the early 1970s before claiming bankrutpsy. Pasanen helped Salminen settle his debts. Salminen was also part-owner of Nasse-Setä OY which sold Spede-related paraphernalia. It was the most successful of Salminen's ventures outside acting.

Salminen created the original statuette for the Venla Awards. The award was changed in 2003.

Salminen was also adversely affected by the downturn and recession experienced in Finland during the early 1990s, which led to the financial problems with his company Lasilandia. The effects continued to plague him in later life. Despite achieving an actor's pension (näyttelijäeläke), it was placed in distraint over the unpaid debts owed from the Lasilandia venture.

== Private life ==
Salminen suffered from a lack of funds in his later years. His apartment in Espoo burned down in 2005, the fire having started from a candle. After the fire, Salminen moved to a service home with the help of MTV3 who paid for his first three years there. Later, Salminen moved to Salo to a cheaper service home where he resided until the end of his life.

Salminen died in 2015 after an extended illness.
