= Tapio Hämäläinen =

Finnish actor (1922–2008)

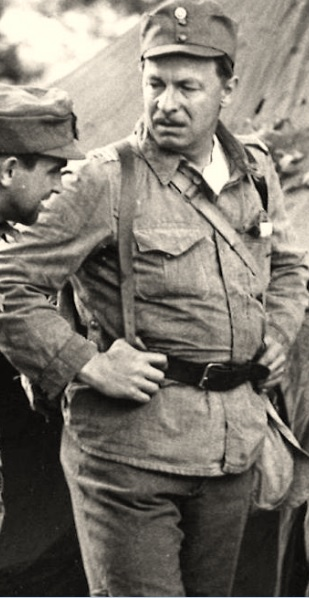
- Tapio Hämäläinen, 1964.
- Born: Eemil Tapio Hämäläinen; 18 June 1922; Uukuniemi, Finland
- Died: 28 January 2008 (aged 85); Helsinki, Finland

Eemil Tapio "Tapsa" Hämäläinen (18 June 1922, in Uukuniemi – 28 January 2008, in Helsinki) was a Finnish actor and theater counsellor.

== Career ==
Hämäläinen's best known roles were as Salo in The Unknown Soldier (The Unknown Soldier) and Councillor Tuura in the Uuno Turhapuro films (1976–1993, 2004). Hämäläinen also appeared in many television series, such as Naapurilähiö. He gave his voice to The Hemulen, The Police Inspector and The Groke in the Finnish dub of the Moomin TV series.

Hämäläinen played Uuno Turhapuro's father-in-law Councillor Tuura in 17 Turhapuro films. Hämäläinen was tired of Tuura's role in the 1990s after shooting films for five years followed by a 23-episode television series.

== Sources ==
=== Further reading ===
- Räty-Hämäläinen, Aino (2000). Pohja se on miunkii säkis (in Finnish). WSOY. ISBN 951-0-24668-9.
