= Marjatta Raita =

Finnish actress (1944–2007)

- Born: 17 February 1944; Pori, Finland
- Died: 27 September 2007 (aged 63); Helsinki, Finland

Marjatta Raita (17 February 1944, Pori – 27 September 2007) was a Finnish actress, who was best known for her role as Elisabeth Turhapuro in the Uuno Turhapuro movies directed by Spede Pasanen.

== Biography ==
Born in Pori, Marjatta Raita's parents were the actors Eino and Valli Raita. She studied at a theater school from 1962 to 1965.

Immediately after completing her studies in 1965, Raita joined the Helsinki City Theatre. She appeared in numerous roles including as Kyllikki in Tulipunakuka, as Mrs. Vallesmann in Burglary, as Crete in Nummisuutarien and as Mrs. Florence in the comedy Diivat. Raita acted mainly in theater and also worked in films.

Since 1981, in addition to her work on the stage, Raita was a trustee of the Kaupunginteatteri Actors' Association and a member of the board of the Theater Foundation as a negotiating member elected by the actors' association.

In 1996, she joined the board of the Finnish Actors' Association. Also in 1996, Raita received the Association's gold merit badge.

She was married to Finnish actor Aarno Sulkanen, with whom she had two children. She died in Helsinki in 2007, aged 63, shortly after being diagnosed with cancer. After her death, the Helsinki City Theatre held a memorial performance, Bertolt Brecht's play The Beggar's Opera, which was Raita's last role.
