= Vesa-Matti Loiri =

Finnish actor and musician (1945–2022)

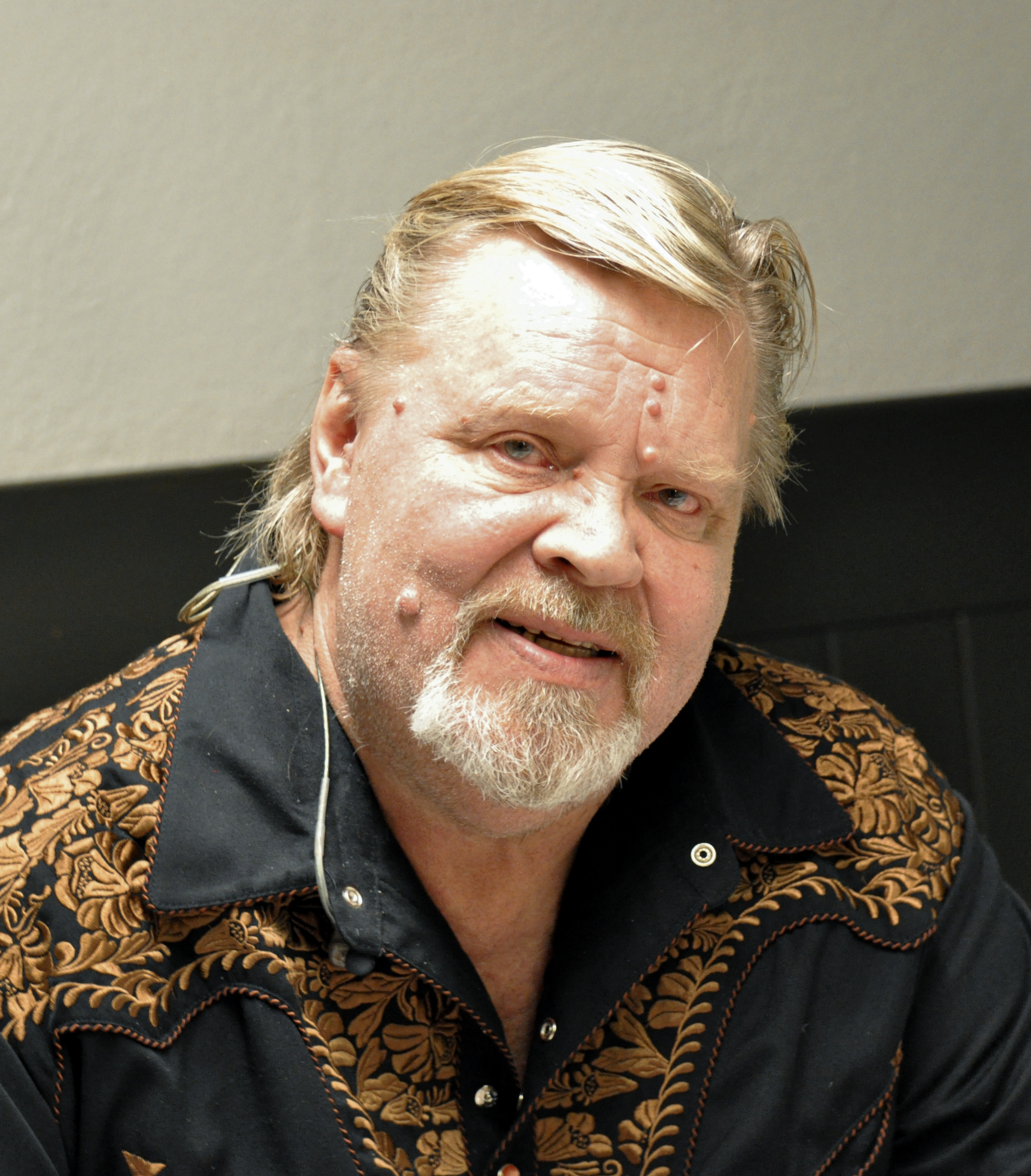
- Loiri in 2011
- Born: 4 January 1945; Helsinki, Finland
- Died: 10 August 2022 (aged 77); Helsinki, Finland
- Other name: Vesku
- Occupations: Actor, musician
- Awards: See below

Vesa-Matti "Vesku" Loiri (4 January 1945 – 10 August 2022) was a Finnish actor, musician and comedian, best known for his role as Uuno Turhapuro, whom he portrayed in a total of 20 movies between the years 1973 and 2004.

Loiri made a strong impression early in his career with the role of Jake in the drama film The Boys. He later acted in notable films such as Rakastunut rampa, Pedon merkki, and The Howling Miller, as well as in the television series Rauta-aika. In the latter part of his career, Loiri appeared in several dramedies, including Tie pohjoiseen (Road North).

Loiri's comedic career began in collaboration with Spede Pasanen during the late 1960s. Together, they created the character Uuno Turhapuro, a slovenly antihero who entertained audiences and frustrated critics through his misadventures. Other comedic characters Loiri portrayed included Nasse-setä, Jean-Pierre Kusela, and Tyyne, all of whom were featured in television sketch shows in the 1980s and later expanded into films and music albums. Loiri, Pasanen, and Simo Salminen formed the popular comedy trio Spede, Vesku ja Simo.

In addition to his comedic roles, Loiri delivered critically acclaimed performances in theatre, such as his portrayal of Kosola in the Ylioppilasteatteri production of Lapualaisooppera and Tuomas in the Turku City Theatre adaptation of Seven Brothers. Loiri was also known for immersing himself deeply in his roles, sometimes to the detriment of his mental health. This was particularly evident with his roles in The Boys and Pahat pojat (Bad Boys), where he portrayed intense and troubled characters.

As a singer, Loiri gained acclaim for his interpretations of Eino Leino's poetry, alongside recording Finnish pop songs, including works by Reino Helismaa and Juha Vainio. Between 2006 and 2008, he released a trilogy of acoustic albums, Ivalo, Inari, and Kasari, which featured Finnish pop and rock classics.

According to Yle News, "Loiri was one of Finland's most beloved cultural figures over six decades, playing comic and tragic roles on screen and stage, alongside a musical career." Loiri died of cancer on 10 August 2022.

== Early life and youth ==
Loiri was born in Helsinki on 4 January 1945 to Taito Vilho Loiri (1911–1995) and Lily Ida Annikki Nylund (1916–2013). His father was a technical draftsman born in Lappee in 1911. His mother was born in Mustasaari in 1916 and grew up in Pori. Lily completed the household department of the Pori Girls' Vocational School. Taito and Lily became engaged in the spring of 1942. The family settled in Töölö, Helsinki, and a year after Vesa-Matti's birth, a younger brother, Veli-Pekka Loiri, was born. The Loiri family had relatives living in Kruununhaka, including Taito's sister Sigrid and her husband Hjalmar Berglund. Their son, Paavo Berglund, would later become a renowned conductor. As a child, Vesa-Matti was called Matti, had heterochromatic eyes, and was said to have learned to sing before he could talk.

Vesa-Matti was a sensitive child who could be moved to tears by a teacher's sharp remark in primary school. Music also evoked strong emotions in him; for instance, Johann Sebastian Bach's Air almost made him feel out of his body. He collected records, including stolen discs sold to him by Olavi Virta's son. However, his greatest inspiration came from films, especially director Ingmar Bergman's The Magician, which left a profound impression on him.

Vesa-Matti and his brother Veli-Pekka spent their summers at their grandmother's house, Lily's childhood home, located in a residential area near the centre of Pori. This offered a better environment for play than Töölö, where the urban setting and traffic limited their activities.

Growing up among the baby boomers, Vesa-Matti had many peers and was regarded as the leader of his group of friends. He led boys' games that often mimicked movies, especially westerns. In the early 1950s, Vesa-Matti sang in the B-section of the boys' choir Cantores Minores. However, by the time he was expected to move up to the A-section, his interests had shifted, and he gave up choir singing. During the 1952 Summer Olympics in Helsinki, the Loiri family moved to Haaga, where Vesa-Matti made his debut in summer theatre. The 1950s educational system in Finland emphasized practical professions over creativity, which led to the Loiri brothers losing interest in school. After primary school, Vesa-Matti attended the newly established Pohjois-Haaga School. In Haaga, he befriended the Kuoppamäki brothers, Jukka and Mikko, with whom he performed as a Star Boy during their teenage years.

In the late 1950s, Vesa-Matti was part of the band Rock Brothers Loiri, which included his brother Veli-Pekka, Mikko Kuoppamäki, and Timo Juslin. Occasionally, he performed as Rock-Olga, a female rock persona. In early 1962, the band performed a youth musical titled Huipulla tuulee (The Wind Blows at the Top), which caught the attention of Paavo Hukkinen, an actor and organizer for Suomen Filmiteollisuus (Finnish Film Industry). Hukkinen inquired if Vesa-Matti would be interested in a film role. This led to his casting in the drama film The Boys.

Loiri had read the novel The Boys upon its release and dreamed of playing the role of Jake. However, he did not actively pursue the role; instead, he was discovered through the aforementioned musical. Loiri later noted that without The Boys, he might not have pursued theater school, as his interests at the time were more focused on music.

=== Military service ===
Loiri applied to the Finnish Theatre Academy in the spring of 1962 but was not admitted at that time. He decided to complete his military service instead. He volunteered for service at the age of 17, but a doctor had marked his fitness classification in a way that was misinterpreted. Loiri began his military service in the Coastal Artillery Regiment at Isosaari near Helsinki in October 1962, just a few weeks before the premiere of the film The Boys. At the same time, he held a trainee contract as a stagehand at the opera house, which had to be terminated due to his military commitment—a process that proved challenging. Loiri was granted leave from the military to travel to Oulu for the premiere of The Boys. He reapplied to the Theatre Academy in the spring of 1963 and was accepted. Loiri completed his military service in September 1963 with the rank of alikersantti.

Loiri grew significantly during his time in the army. When he began his service, he was 169 centimetres tall, and by the time he was discharged, he had grown to 183 centimetres. He also matured emotionally, although he described the overall experience as unpleasant; the military helped to curb his self-centeredness, preventing the popularity of The Boys from going to his head.

== Career ==
=== Acting career ===
Loiri's acting career spanned approximately 60 years. He performed in theatre, film, and television, with his career often described as built from highly contrasting elements. While best known for his comedic roles, he also acted in serious dramas. Over 70 film roles are credited to him. Six films starring Loiri are in the top 20 list of the highest-grossing domestic films in Finland. The total number of tickets sold to the screenings of these six films is 3,715,948.

==== Theatre roles ====
At the same time, the diversity and depth of Loiri's career are unfortunately overshadowed, as fewer people remember his inspired and profound interpretations on stage or the intense performances in serious films that counterbalanced his Turhapuro comedies.

— Petri Nevalainen

Loiri was part of the Helsinki City Theatre from 1966 to 1971 and the Turku City Theatre from 1973 to 1977. Between 1971 and 1973, he worked as a freelance actor.

===== Helsinki City Theatre =====
Many actors of the previous generation were known for their heavy drinking. Leo Lähteenmäki helped the young Loiri connect with his small role in The Kurdish Prince by giving him alcohol, aiming to induce a mild hangover to help unlock the performance. Later, Loiri passed on this method to Aake Kalliala. One of the earliest mentions of Loiri's theatre roles appeared in Helsingin Sanomat in September 1964, describing his minor part in Under the North Star as a "feverish Singer Boy".

In the 1960s, Loiri's early career was marked by leftist influences, partly due to his connections to the political song movement. Notable roles included "God's Chosen Leader" Kosola in Arvo Salo's Lapualaisooppera, Tuomas in Kalle Holmberg's production of Seven Brothers, and Nikolai Stavrogin in Dostoevsky's Demons. Directors who influenced him included Matti Aro, Ralf Långbacka, and Arto af Hällström, but Holmberg was the most significant. Loiri would cancel lighter projects, such as films, to collaborate with Holmberg, finding the partnership creatively revitalizing.

When directing Lapualaisooppera, Holmberg asked Loiri if he could imagine doing political theatre. Loiri replied, "Politics don't interest me at all." Holmberg clarified that it was about theatre, not politics, and Loiri agreed. Thus began a 30-year collaboration between the two.

Lapualaisooppera premiered in March 1966. Loiri's portrayal of Kosola was highly internalized and powerfully delivered, captivating the audience with his first line, "Kosola is coming!" The play became one of the most significant in Finnish theatre history, receiving extensive media coverage. Helsingin Sanomat critic Sole Uexküll highlighted Loiri's resonant voice and youthful appearance.

In spring 1969, Loiri played Kyösti Karjanmaa in The Ostrobothnians, again directed by Holmberg. During a fight scene, he injured his leg and took a weeks-long sick leave, coinciding with a theatre seminar. Despite his injury, he managed to perform on stage, but his legs gave out immediately after exiting.

===== Turku City Theatre =====
Holmberg's adaptation of Aleksis Kivi's Seven Brothers was performed at Turku City Theatre from 1972 to 1976, with additional shows in Gothenburg and Berlin. Loiri played Tuomas, a role he inherited after Juha Hyppönen left for non-artistic reasons. The production was a hectic period for Loiri, as he also filmed the first Uuno movie in summer 1973 and welcomed his first child in the fall.

Other notable productions during his Turku years included Tasangolta tuulee, focusing on Turkish migrant workers, and Anton Chekhov's The Cherry Orchard, in which he portrayed Yasha.

==== Opera ====
His singing performance did not meet opera's demands, but what he lacked in vocal ability, Vesa-Matti more than compensated for by portraying a strong and credible Jimmy Mahoney.

— Tamara Lund on Loiri's performance in Rise and Fall of the City of Mahagonny

In 1992, Loiri portrayed a blind singer in Aulis Sallinen's opera Kullervo, with Jorma Hynninen in the title role. Kullervo premiered in Los Angeles in February 1992 and had its Finnish debut at Helsinki's new opera house in November 1993. Loiri's performance received mixed reviews, but subsequent performances in Nantes in 1995 were more favourably received.

Loiri had previously performed the role of Jimmy Mahoney in The Rise and Fall of the City of Mahagonny from 1970 to 1971.

==== Film roles ====
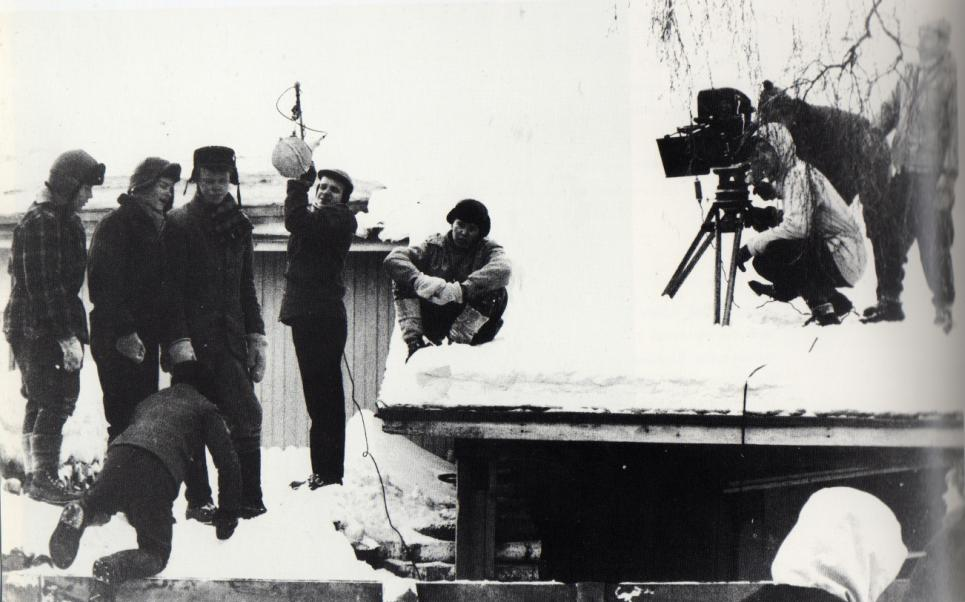
Loiri in 1962 in his first film role in Pojat. Loiri is third from the left in the back row.

Vesa-Matti Loiri's first film role was at the age of 17 in Mikko Niskanen's youth drama Pojat (1962). However, his breakthrough role is often considered to be in Niskanen's Lapualaismorsian (1967). Loiri performed significant dramatic roles in films such as Rakastunut rampa (1975), Pedon merkki (1981), Sokkotanssi (1999), Rumble (2002), Pahat pojat (2003), and Tie pohjoiseen (2012).

===== Spede Productions =====
Loiri as Uuno Turhapuro (character) in 1985

Loiri starred in 19 Uuno Turhapuro films and over ten other full-length films produced by Spede Pasanen. Most were directed by Ere Kokkonen, as were the Turhapuro films. These productions were characterized by strong box-office results but often poor critical reception. Loiri's first appearance in a Spede production was in Noin 7 veljestä (1968), directed by Jukka Virtanen. Loiri played a soldier in this comedic film known for its anachronistic humour. This marked the beginning of a long-lasting collaboration between Loiri, Pasanen, and Simo Salminen.

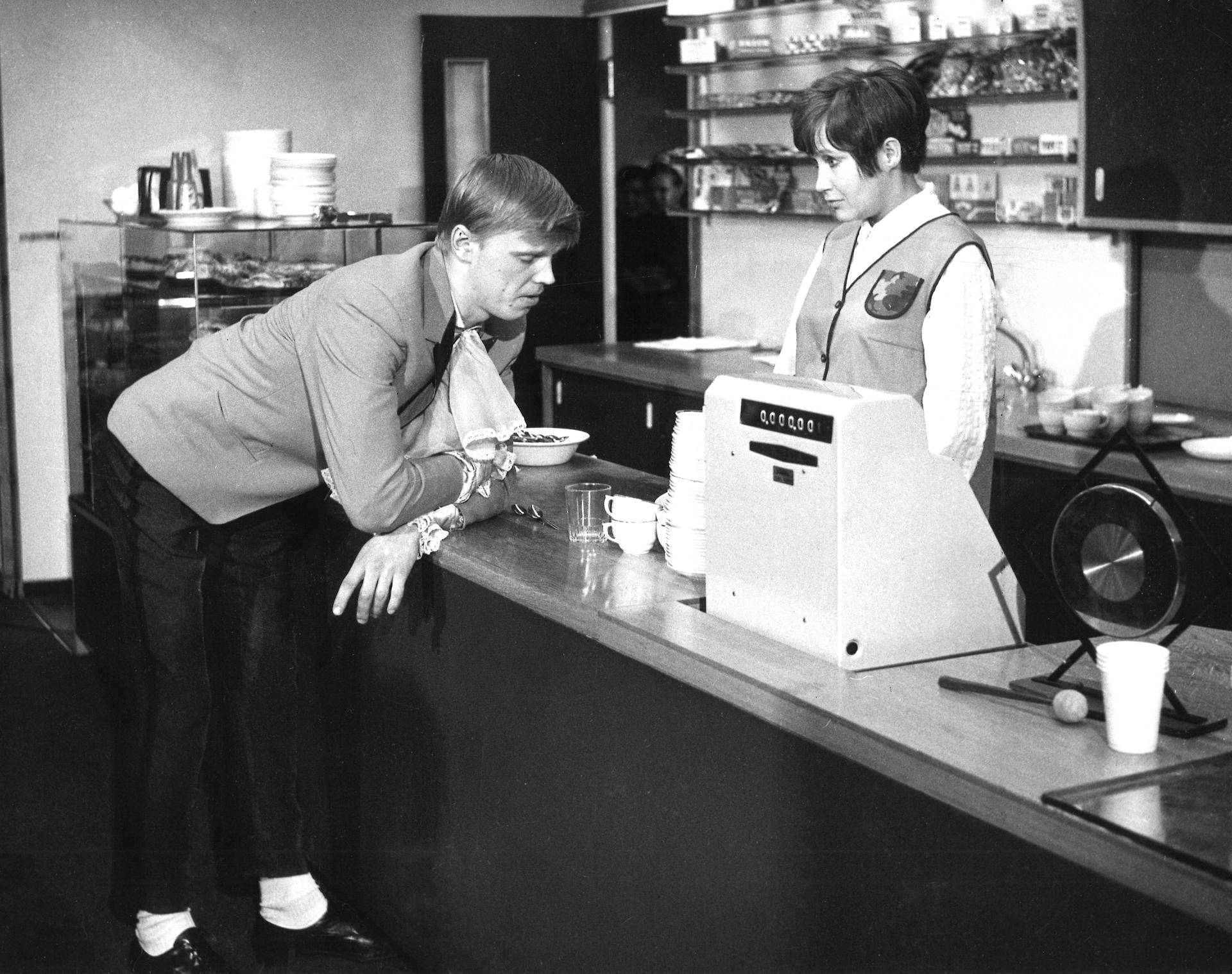
Loiri in his role in Näköradiomiehen ihmeelliset siekailut with Tarja-Tuulikki Tarsala in 1969

Loiri's performance in Näköradiomiehen ihmeelliset siekailut (1969) was noted by Aamulehti's Matti Rosvall: "Loiri carries the role admirably, even though it is a collection of absurd situations rather than a cohesive role." That same year, Leikkikalugangsteri premiered, in which critics felt Loiri needed strong direction to avoid falling into mannerisms.

The first colour Spede production, Pohjan tähteet (1969), starred Loiri as the lead character Pohja. He also co-wrote the script with Pasanen and Kokkonen. Critics praised Loiri's multifaceted talent in the film, which has been considered one of the best Spede productions despite its shortcomings.

In 1970, Loiri played the titular role in Jussi Pussi, a satire of the leftist student movements of the time. Although contemporary critics disapproved of the film's anti-intellectualism and risqué humour, later reviews acknowledged its cultural and satirical value.

Loiri continued his collaboration with Pasanen and Kokkonen, contributing as a co-writer for Speedy Gonzales – noin 7 veljeksen poika (1970) and appearing in major Spede productions such as Kahdeksas veljes (1971) and Hirttämättömät (1971). His role in the latter earned praise for his portrayal of an anti-hero.

Loiri's portrayal of Uuno Turhapuro began with the eponymous film Uuno Turhapuro in 1973. These films became box-office successes, sustaining Finnish cinema during a period of decline. Though often criticized, the Turhapuro series gained cultural significance over time.

===== Other productions =====
Loiri's debut in Pojat received critical acclaim, with reviewers highlighting his naturalistic performance. The iconic final scene, where his character Jake chases after a departing train, is considered a landmark moment in Finnish cinema. Loiri also appeared in films by Jörn Donner, including Hellyys (1972) and Krapula (1973), though these performances garnered less attention.

===== Dubbing =====
He was the voice of the Genie in the Finnish dub of Disney's Aladdin, even performing the musical numbers Friend Like Me and Prince Ali. When dubbing the Genie, Loiri did not see the original Robin Williams version and was only given a slight idea of what the original gags and jokes were. Disney gave the team an award for the best foreign Aladdin dub.

==== Television roles ====
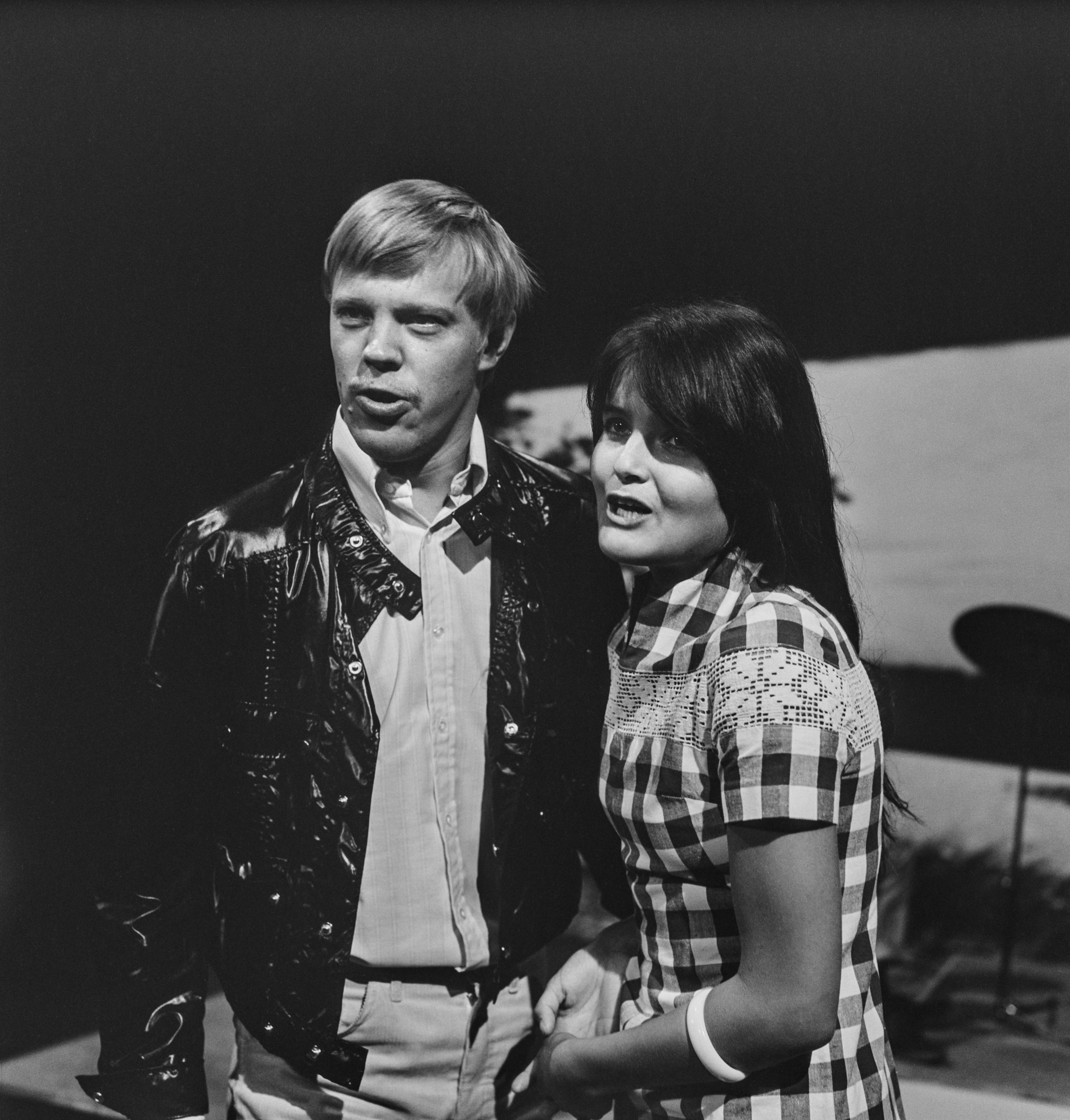
Loiri and Kristiina Halkola in the Yleisradio television program Oma. Omat ja varastetut. Kabaree! in 1969

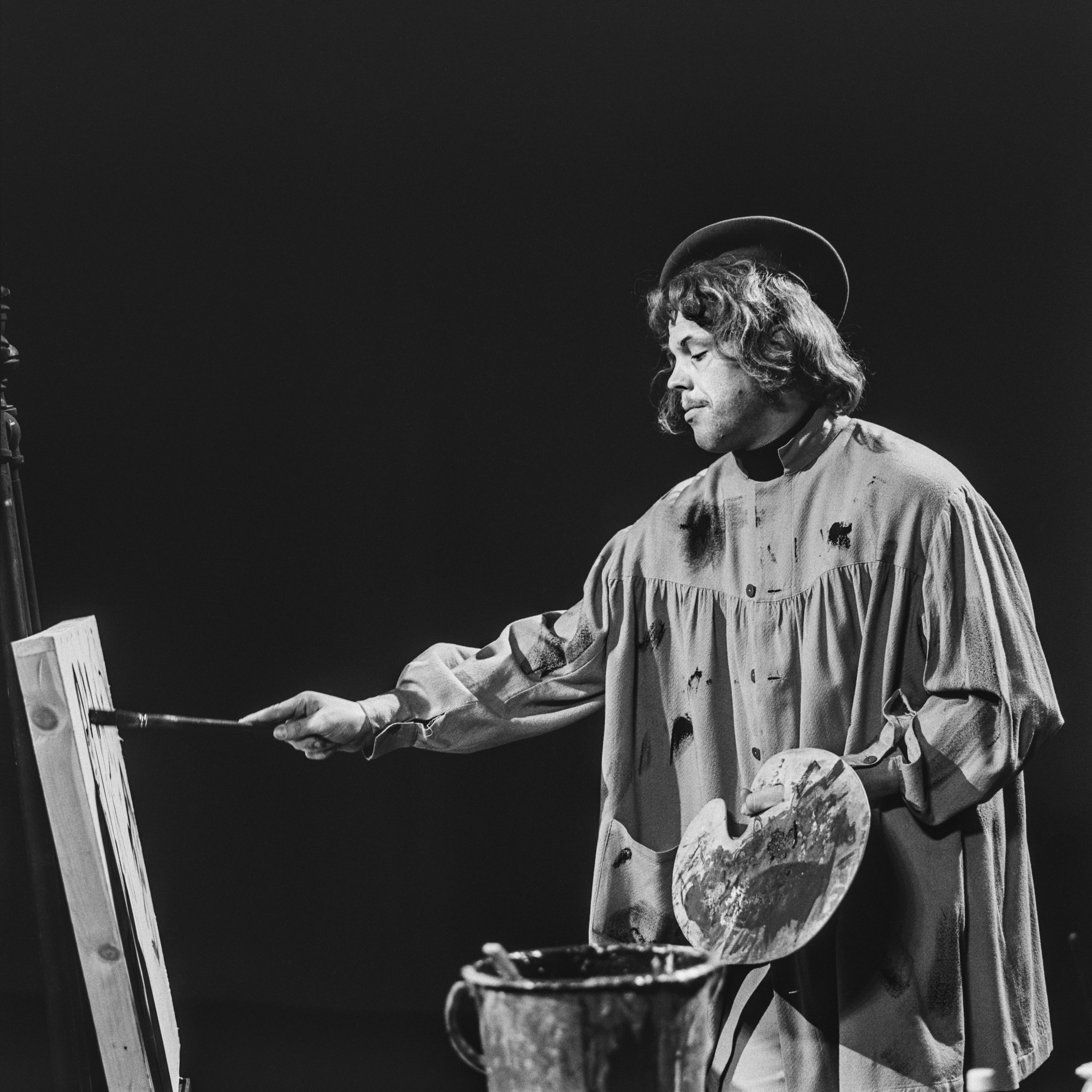
Loiri in the Yleisradio television program Naked City in 1969

In the 1960s, Loiri acted in Yleisradio's TV theater, where his early roles included Aljoška in Mikko Niskanen's television play Ihmisiä elämän pohjalla (1967) and Tommi in Veikko Kerttula's play Olviretki Schleusingenissa (1967). Later, Loiri played a significant role as the blacksmith Ilmarinen in the TV theater's Kalevala adaptation titled Rauta-aika (1982).

The story of Tykkimies Kauppala was adapted into a television play in 1977, and Loiri reprised his familiar stage role. According to Loiri's biographer Tuomas Marjamäki, Kauppala is like an older version of Jaakko from the film Pojat. The tragedy of Kauppala is based on true events witnessed by the work's author, Ruuth, during his military service.

In December 1979, Tuija-Maija Niskanen's television film Seth Mattsonin tarina, starring Loiri in the title role, was broadcast for the first time. The role of the suicidal Seth Mattson became too intense and real for Loiri, and he required professional help to overcome it.

Directed by Kalle Holmberg, Rauta-aika became a major television event of its time. Loiri's role as the blacksmith Ilmarinen surprised many, as he was predominantly known as Uuno Turhapuro at that time. For some contemporaries, the connection to Turhapuro became a pretext for criticizing Rauta-aika. Despite being an expensive and controversial production, it received numerous awards. Production of Rauta-aika began as early as 1978, during which Loiri periodically underwent psychiatric treatment. His mental collapse was preceded by multiple personal blows, such as the death of his wife Mona Loiri in a traffic accident and tax disputes. The situation was exacerbated by the combination of sedatives and alcohol.

Jukka Kajava called Rauta-aika "the greatest Finnish television creation of all time". However, its costs were understated at over five million Finnish marks. In 1982, Jörn Donner estimated the actual cost of Rauta-aika to be 26 million marks, equivalent to approximately 12.6 million euros in 2023.

Turhapuro has occasionally been considered a modernized version of Juutas Käkriäinen from the novel Putkinotko. In 1998, Loiri played the role of Juutas in Reima Kekäläinen's television series Putkinotko. Juutas' foul-mouthed wife Rosina was portrayed by Eija Vilpas, and Loiri's daughter Jenni Loiri also appeared in the series.

Loiri also appeared in several short films. The cult classic Jani Volanen's farcical road movie Rumble (2002) featured Loiri as Leo, the eldest member of a reckless quartet. In 1995, Loiri played a supporting role in Jukka-Pekka Siili's psychological drama Ruuvimies, portraying a warehouse worker, Simo Nikander, whose romantic interest is Titta Jokinen's secretary Vaara.

===== Vesku Show =====
Loiri's titular show, Vesku Show (1988–1991), was both written by and starred Loiri, alongside Simo Salminen, Hannele Lauri, Eija Vilpas, and Juha Muje. Episodes ran approximately 45 minutes without advertisements and aired every four weeks. The program was a direct continuation of Spede Show, in which Loiri participated during the early 1970s and again from 1984, after a ten-year hiatus. Several of Loiri's iconic characters from Spede Show, such as the singer Kusela and television announcer Tyyne, were carried over into Vesku Show. A new character introduced in the series was a big-toothed bartender known for the catchphrase "jummi jammia". The show garnered up to 1.6 million viewers at its peak.

==== Comedy characters ====
As a comedian, Loiri gained recognition in the late 1960s through the television series Jatkoaika. In the fall of 1968, Jatkoaika organized "unofficial Finnish championship competitions for falling", in which Loiri participated, making exaggerated pratfalls one of his trademarks. One of his early comedy characters, the clumsy Hemminki Hämminki, was born. Wearing oversized costumes, Hemminki Hämminki also spoke in a unique style, adding a "p" sound before consonants. This became known as "ploirism".

Loiri's first comedic role on television was as Sankari in Hannes Häyrinen's popular comedy series Hanski in the fall of 1966. In the spring of 1967, he appeared in the musical May Day comedy Kivenhakkaaja Valperin painajaiset.

Loiri rose to national fame portraying Uuno Turhapuro, a character that originated in Spede's television programs and made its film debut in Uuno Turhapuro (1973). The precursor to Uuno, Usko, first appeared in Spede Show on 12 September 1971. Usko did not yet exhibit Uuno's trademark mumbling speech or exaggerated gait and dressed neatly, but the essence of Turhapuro was already discernible. The final Turhapuro film, Uuno Turhapuro – This Is My Life, was made in 2004, 31 years later. Initially sceptical that a sketch character would work in a full-length film, Loiri quickly changed his mind. Turhapuro stands apart among Loiri's comedic creations for its longevity. Other well-known characters appearing in both television and films include Nasse-setä, Jean-Pierre Kusela, and Tyyne.

The comedic characters were given small backstories. Nasse-setä, a leftist who despises children, started as a cultural journalist in television. His career advanced by marching under a red flag. Over time, Nasse became an alcoholic and transitioned into children's programming, which ironically endeared him to young audiences. The character of Tyyne originated from Loiri trying on Saija Hakola's wigs. Tyyne is a call girl seeking wealthy men. Jean-Pierre Kusela, with his large nose and pretentious manner, began evolving in the early 1970s. He took credit for others' songs and laughed with a boisterous, fake laugh, accompanied by pianist Olli Ahvenlahti.

In 1996, MTV3 produced a 23-episode television series about Turhapuro, aired during the spring season. Written by Spede Pasanen and directed by Reija Virolainen, it featured the Turhapuro film cast, except for Härski Hartikainen. The series was a disappointment and has never been released on DVD. However, it helped launch the career of musician Linda Lampenius, who played psychiatrist Kielo Nuppu.

According to Peter von Bagh, Loiri's comedic characters resonate with the "national psyche". They combine bold and subtle humour, blending adult and children's comedy. Underpinning all of them is Loiri's inherent seriousness and sharp observational skills. In the role of Uuno Turhapuro, Loiri masterfully navigated the spectrum between "normality" and madness.

Loiri's extensive workload brought substantial income. In 1973, he earned a six-figure sum and faced scrutiny from tax authorities. Alongside his work in theatre, films, and television, he supplemented his income through television advertisements, which offered high returns for minimal time investment. While Loiri incurred tax debts, he cleared them by the late 1980s. For Loiri, comedy's most important contribution was its capacity to critique inhumanity.

=== Musician ===
Ynjevi was a real work. And I put my all into it at night, once I was free from the theater.

— Loiri about his fourth studio album.

As a singer, Vesa-Matti Loiri is known for interpreting Finnish schlager music and songs set to the poems of Eino Leino. His repertoire also includes humorous songs, Carl Michael Bellman's drinking songs, folk-style interpretations of Finnish rock classics, and Christmas carols. Loiri's first single, released in 1968, was the humorous "Saiskos pluvan?", followed by around 40 singles, the last being "Eilen kun mä tiennyt en" (2016), a duet with Paula Koivuniemi. In the 2000s, Loiri slowed his work pace due to health issues, and music took precedence over films in his career.

Adding the letter "P" to the beginning of words became known as "ploirism", spreading even among schoolchildren. This trend led to subpar essay grades. The phrase "Plupa" carries a deeper meaning, mocking Finnish men's difficulty initiating conversations on the dance floor. Loiri used his comedy to highlight Finnish customs' oddities, such as the popularity of the tango, which he viewed as a sign of poor musical taste. He parodied the genre with songs like "Lankon tango" and "Vie minut minne tahdot", the latter being so skilful a parody that it was not always recognized as satire. According to Loiri, Finns do not understand parody unless it is very overt.

Loiri also played the flute, particularly jazz, and his debut album, 4+20 (1971), was almost entirely instrumental. It includes a rendition of Oskar Merikanto's "Itkevä huilu" (lit. 'Weeping flute'). Loiri performed frequently at Pori Jazz, debuting in 1974.

The first pressing of 4+20 was limited to about 4,000 copies, with reissues appearing only in the 2010s. The original album became a collector's favourite, fetching high prices. Loiri's second album, Vesku Suomesta, released in 1972, featured jazz-inspired renditions of folk songs. He had not yet found his style as a recording artist, as evidenced by his next two albums. The 1973 release Veskunoita was a comedy album, while the 1974 Merirosvokapteeni Ynjevi Lavankopoksahdus was a children's album. A critic from Ilta-Sanomat described Vesku Suomesta as "immature", blaming the album's producers while acknowledging Loiri's singing voice.

In the early 1980s, Loiri transitioned from performing in restaurants to large concert halls. In the spring of 1980, he performed at the Finlandia Hall, interpreting, among others, Leino's poems. That same year, Loiri represented Finland in the Eurovision Song Contest with "Huilumies", composed specifically for him by Aarno Raninen. The song finished last in the final with six points.

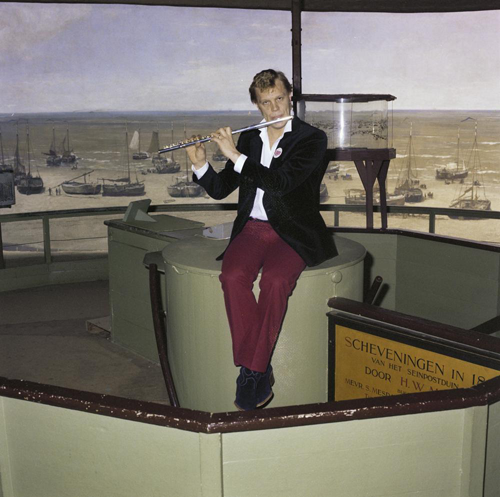
Loiri in 1980

Loiri recorded songs based on Eino Leino's poems for the first time on the 1978 album Eino Leino. The album sold double platinum, with nearly 118,000 copies sold. He released four albums based on Leino's works, the last being Päivän laskiessa in 2001. The compositions were by Henrik Otto Donner and amateur musician Perttu Hietanen, with arrangements by guitarist Taisto Wesslin. Loiri also interpreted songs written by Reino Helismaa on the album Vesku Helismaasta (1977) and by Juha Vainio on two Ystävän laulut albums (2003 and 2004).

In the 1980s, Loiri's comedy characters inspired three albums. As Jean-Pierre Kusela, he released Naurava kulkuri (1986) and Voi hyvä tavaton (1987). As Tyyne Lipasti, he recorded Pim peli pom (1988), featuring interpretations of "Tahdon olla sulle hellä" and "Fiilaten ja höyläten". Each sold tens of thousands of copies. The bartender Auvo starred in two cassettes titled Erittäin kliffaa, containing sketches instead of music.

In 1998, Loiri held a church concert tour, raising nearly 170,000 Finnish marks for the Finnish Red Cross.

From 2006 to 2008, Loiri released the Lappi trilogy, featuring acoustic versions of Finnish pop and rock songs. The trilogy concluded with Kasari in 2008, which Loiri called "perhaps the last album". However, he released Hyvää puuta in 2009, featuring songs written for him by J. Karjalainen, Heikki Salo, and Jarkko Martikainen.

During his career, Loiri sold over 730,000 certified records in Finland and is currently the fifth-best-selling soloist and ninth-best-selling artist of all time in the country.

=== Athlete ===
Loiri also had a lifelong interest and exceptional talent in a number of sports, especially association football. It has been said that, had he not chosen to concentrate on acting, he could have become a national professional-level goalkeeper. He was signed by juggernauts HJK for one season in 1972.

Loiri attended Pohjois-Haagan yhteiskoulu and engaged in various sports, including boxing, football, handball, water polo, ice hockey, billiards, and golf. In 1969, he stated that he enjoyed playing ball sports, "from ice hockey to billiards". Loiri always played as a goalkeeper in team sports. He won Finnish championships in water polo and handball. Among the sports he practised, he considered football and boxing the most serious. He gave up his sports career in favour of acting.

As a child, Loiri was deeply impressed by Yugoslavian goalkeeper Vladimir Beara's penalty kick save during the football final between Hungary and Yugoslavia in the Helsinki Olympics, inspiring him to become a goalkeeper. His other football idols included Russian Lev Yashin and Spanish Ricardo Zamora. Loiri played football for Huopalahden Hurjat and Töölön Vesa during his youth. In the early 1960s, he joined Töölön Vesa's first team in Finland's third division but ended his football career when he started studying at the Theatre Academy Helsinki.

Later, Loiri played as a goalkeeper for the entertainers' sports club Zoom, from which HJK recruited him in November 1971 as a reserve goalkeeper due to an injury crisis. HJK had monitored Loiri since his time at Töölön Vesa. According to Markku Peltoniemi, his flexibility stood out, although his ball-handling and technique were not on par with Finland's top-tier goalkeepers. Loiri played one season with HJK in 1972. During that season, he participated in at least one match in the Finnish Cup and part of an exhibition game against Polish club Górnik Katowice. HJK's head coach Raimo Kauppinen described Loiri as a good goalkeeper who was serious and committed. Loiri also played for Finnairin Palloilijat. Both Peltoniemi and Loiri believed that he could have become a top-level Finnish goalkeeper if he had focused solely on football.

In water polo, Loiri won three Finnish championships, representing Helsingfors Simsällskap. He was partly recruited to the team to attract more spectators. Previously, water polo matches had not even charged admission, but when Loiri played, Helsingin urheilutalo games were sold out. As a goalkeeper, he performed particularly well in home matches. In handball, Loiri won one Finnish championship, representing Sjundeå Idrottsförening. Totte Nikander, a former national team coach, convinced him to join. In ice hockey, Loiri played as a goalkeeper for Jokers' second team and for Kiekko-67 during his time in Turku, competing in Finland's second and third divisions. He always played as a goalkeeper in these sports as well.

Loiri was fascinated by boxing from a young age and participated in youth boxing. Between 1969 and 1970, he fought three matches in the 75 kg open category, winning two. Although he had trained in boxing, these matches were partly publicity stunts to fill seats, as audiences were curious about how the well-known actor would perform. Loiri stated that his sense of rhythm was helpful in boxing but acknowledged that black eyes would not have suited an acting career.

Loiri was also a talented billiards player, showcasing his skills in the film Uuno Turhapuro armeijan leivissä (1984). His serious billiards play focused on Kaisa, the only competitive format in Finland at the time. He achieved a career-best 14th place in the national championships. He served as chairman of the Finnish Billiard Federation for multiple years, receiving the federation's silver merit award in 1989.

In golf, Loiri organized the Vesku Open, a namesake tournament held at Vierumäki for four years. Golf remained a hobby without notable achievements. He was also an avid harness racing enthusiast, owning horses from the 1980s onward. One of his horses, Fabrice Duo, won the Suuri Suomalainen Derby in 2015.

== Personal life ==
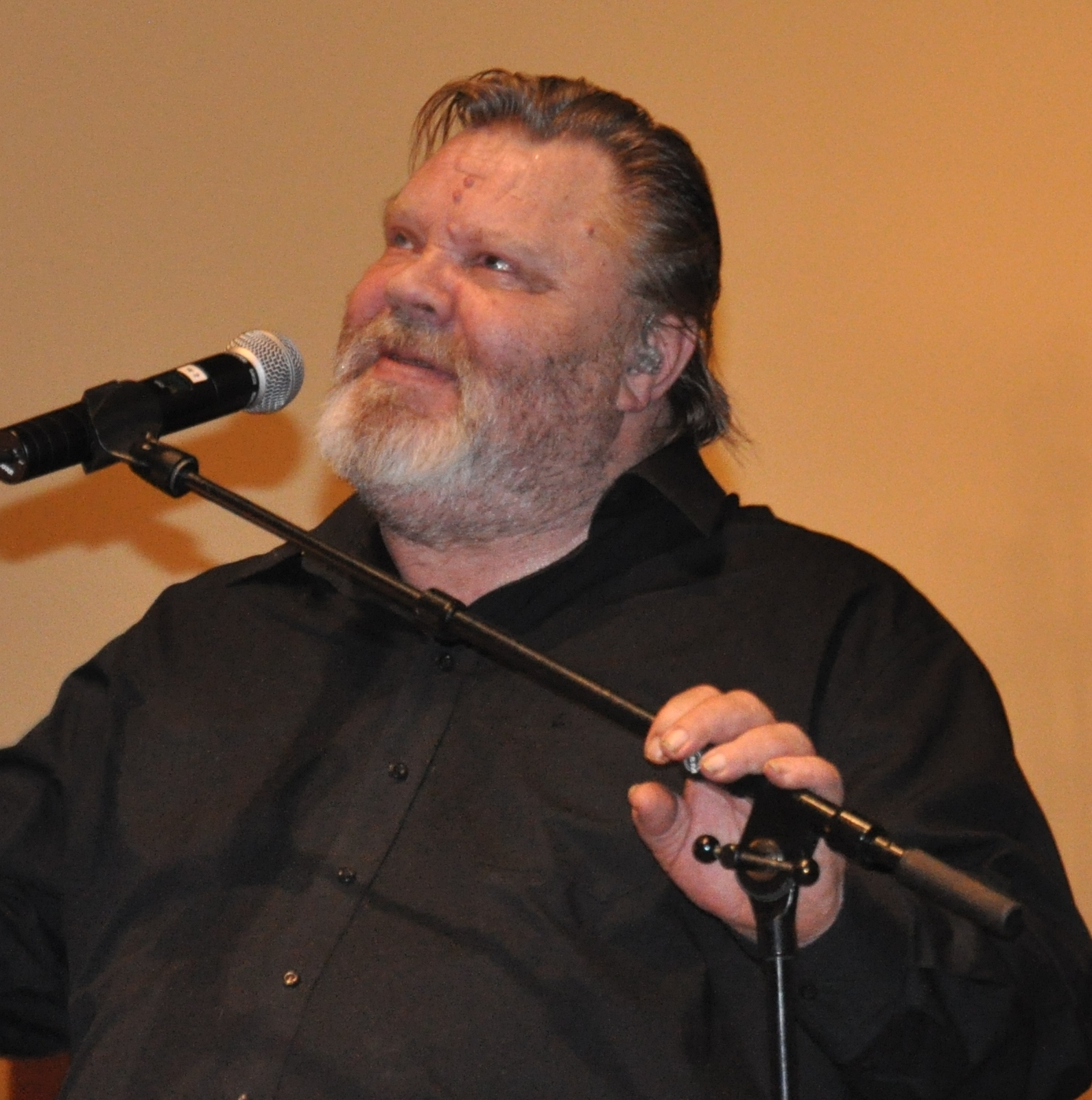
Loiri performing at Mikaelinkirkko in Turku in 2009

=== Relationships ===
Loiri was married three times, with two marriages ending in divorce and one in his spouse's death.

His first wife was actress Tuula Nyman, to whom he was married from 1967 to 1969. His second wife, Mona Loiri, died in a car accident in 1977. Vesa-Matti and Mona Loiri's son Jan also died in a car accident in 1994 at the age of 20. With his third wife, Riitta Loiri, Vesa-Matti had two children: Jenni (b. 1979) and Joonas (1982–2019). Loiri was engaged to model Katja Peiponen from 1971 to 1972 and later to model Marita Hakala from 1989 to 1993. From 1994 onward, he was in a domestic partnership with Stina Toljander (later Edelmann), who was 23 years his junior. Loiri and Toljander lived together in Pakila, Helsinki. They had two sons, Ukko (b. 1995) and Sampo (b. 1996), before separating in 1999. Loiri also dated Lenita Airisto in the 1970s.

=== Injury and lifestyle ===
In 1970, just before filming Speedy Gonzales – Noin 7 veljeksen poika, Loiri was seriously injured while playing football. He reportedly had a near-death experience, including an out-of-body experience. Pertti Melasniemi replaced him in the role of bank robber Clyde in the film. In addition to his injuries, the tragic deaths of his wife and son deepened his interest in spirituality and visions of the afterlife. During the late 1970s, Loiri became a student of clairvoyant Aino Kassinen for several years.

Loiri's worldview was often described as deeply spiritual. He was fascinated by esotericism and occultism.

== Death ==
On 10 August 2022, Loiri died from cancer, at the age of 77. His funeral was held on 20 September 2022 at St. John's Church in Helsinki.

== Awards and recognitions ==
Pahat pojat album's gold record celebration in 2003

- 1963: Honorary Jussi Award for his role in Pojat.
- 1976: Jussi Award for Best Male Actor in Rakastunut rampa.
- 1982: Jussi Award for Best Supporting Male Actor in Pedon merkki.
- 1983: Jussi Award for his wide appearance in the year's films.
- 1984: Telvis Award for Best Male Performer.
- 1986: Telvis Award for Best Male Performer.
- 1987: Telvis Award for Best Male Performer.
- 1989: Special Venla award.
- 1996: Awarded the Pro Finlandia Medal by President Martti Ahtisaari.
- 1998: Betoni-Jussi for lifetime achievement in film.
- 1999: Special Telvis Award.
- 2003: Emma Award for Male Soloist of the Year.
- 2003: Awarded at the International Independent Film Festival in Brussels for his role in Pahat pojat.
- 2006: Emma Award for Male Soloist of the Year.
- 2007: Emma Award for Male Soloist of the Year.
- 2010: Lifetime Achievement Award at the Black Nights Film Festival in Tallinn.
- 2011: Golden Venla for exceptional contributions to Finnish television.
- 2011: State Prize for Art in Finland.

== Legacy ==
Peter von Bagh considered Loiri to be undoubtedly one of Finland's most talented and powerful actors. In 2005, he was voted the second-best Finnish actor of all time in an Aamulehti readers' poll.

Mika Kaurismäki directed a documentary about Loiri titled Vesku, which premiered in Ivalo on 20 August 2010. Loiri, who personally selected the participants for the documentary, stated that the film deeply moved him and gave his full approval to Kaurismäki's vision.

In 2010, Petri Nevalainen published a biography of Loiri titled Saiskos pluvan, Vesa-Matti Loiri. However, Loiri did not participate in the making of the book, did not give interviews, and did not approve the biography. He expressed dissatisfaction with its unauthorized nature.

In September 2019, Otava published a biography of Loiri written by Jari Tervo titled Loiri.

In August 2013, HJK Helsinki honoured Loiri as the club's most colourful goalkeeper of all time.

In 2023, Yle produced a 20-episode audio drama titled Rakastitko, Vesku? The drama was written by Liila Jokelin, Jussi Moila, and Juhana von Bagh, who also directed the production. Pyry Kähkönen portrayed Loiri in the series.

== Discography ==
=== Albums ===
Year	Album	Peak positions	Certification
Year	Album	FIN	Certification
1971	4+20		
1972	Vesku Suomesta		
1973	Veskunoita		
1974	Merirosvokapteeni Ynjevi Lavankopoksahdus		
1977	Vesku Helismaasta		
1978	Eino Leino	19	
1980	Ennen viimeistä maljaa		
1980	Eino Leino 2		
1981	Vesa-Matti Loiri tulkitsee Oskar Merikannon lauluja		
1983	Täällä Pohjantähden alla		
1984	Lasihelmipeli		
1985	Eino Leino 3		
1986	Naurava kulkuri		
1987	Voi hyvä tavaton		
1988	Pim peli pom		
1988	Sydämeeni joulun teen		
1989	Unelmia		
1990	Seitsemän kertaa		
1994	Vesa-Matti Loiri		
1995	Kaksin		
1995	Uuno Kailas		
1995	Nauravan kulkurin paluu		
1997	Rurja		
1998	Sydämeeni joulun teen	6	
2000	Kirkkokonsertti	–	
2001	Eino Leino 4 – Päivän laskiessa	6	
2003	Ystävän laulut	1	
2004	Ystävän laulut II – Albatrossi	2	
2004	Ivalo	1	
2004	Inari	1	
2008	Kasari	1	
2009	Hyvää puuta	2	
2010	Skarabee	3	
2011	4+20 (re-release)	3	
2013	Tuomittuna kulkemaan	1	
2014	Kaikkien aikojen Loiri	6	
2015	Runoilijan tie	29	
2016	Pyhät tekstit	4	
2024	Kolmastoista huhtikuuta (with Peter Lerche)	26	

=== Compilations ===
Year	Album	Peak positions	Certification
Year	Album	FIN	Certification
1973	Laulu on iloni ja työni		
1992	Lapin kesä		
1996	20 suosikkia – Lapin kesä		
1996	20 suosikkia – Saiskos pluvan		
1999	Lauluja rakastamisen vaikeudesta		
2001	Kaikki parhaat		
2001	Parhaat – Vesku Suomesta	18	
2007	Ystävän laulut 1 & 2 (compilation of 2003 and 2004 albums)	12	
2008	Naurava Kulkuri – Huumorinkukkia	17	
2012	Lauluni aiheet I	14	
2012	Lauluni aiheet II	27	
2012	Lauluni aiheet III	28	

=== Singles ===
- 2008: "Sydämeeni joulun teen" (reached No. 14 in the Finnish Singles Chart)
- 2009: "Hyvää puuta" (reached No. 19 in the Finnish Singles Chart)

== Filmography ==
- Pojat (1962)
- Lapualaismorsian (1967)
- Luule kanssamme (1968)
- Noin seitsemän veljestä (1968)
- Oma (1969)
- Näköradiomiehen ihmeelliset siekailut (1969)
- Leikkikalugangsteri (1969)
- Pohjan tähteet (1969)
- Jussi Pussi (1970)
- Kahdeksas veljes (1971)
- Hirttämättömät (1971)
- Hellyys (1972)
- Lasinen eläintarha (1973)
- Uuno Turhapuro (1973)
- Robin Hood ja hänen iloiset vekkulinsa Sherwoodin pusikoissa (1974)
- Professori Uuno D.G. Turhapuro (1975)
- Rakastunut rampa (1975)
- Seitsemän veljestä (1976)
- Lottovoittaja UKK Turhapuro (1976)
- Tykkimies Kauppalan viimeiset vaiheet (1977)
- Häpy Endkö? Eli kuinka Uuno Turhapuro sai niin kauniin ja rikkaan vaimon (1977)
- Rautakauppias Uuno Turhapuro, presidentin vävy (1978)
- Koeputkiaikuinen ja Simon enkelit (1979)
- Tup akka lakko (1980)
- Pedon merkki (1981)
- Uuno Turhapuron aviokriisi (1981)
- Uuno Turhapuro menettää muistinsa (1982)
- Ulvova mylläri (1982)
- Jon (1983)
- Uuno Turhapuron muisti palailee pätkittäin (1983)
- Lentävät luupäät (1984)
- Uuno Turhapuro armeijan leivissä (1984)
- Kepissä on kaksi päätä (1985)
- Hei kliffaa hei (1985)
- Uuno Epsanjassa (1985)
- Uuno Turhapuro muuttaa maalle (1986)
- Liian iso keikka (1986)
- Pikkupojat (1986)
- Älä itke Iines (1987)
- Uuno Turhapuro – kaksoisagentti (1987)
- Tupla-Uuno (1988)
- Uunon huikeat poikamiesvuodet maaseudulla (1990)
- Uuno Turhapuro, herra Helsingin herra (1991)
- Vääpeli Körmy ja vetenalaiset vehkeet (1991)
- Uuno Turhapuro, Suomen tasavallan herra presidentti (1992)
- Kuka on Joe Louis? (1992)
- Ripa ruostuu (1993)
- Uuno Turhapuron poika (1993)
- Vääpeli Körmy – taisteluni (1994)
- Kesäyön unelma (1994)
- Ruuvimies (1995)
- Kummeli: Kultakuume (1997)
- Johtaja Uuno Turhapuro – pisnismies (1998)
- Sokkotanssi (1999)
- History Is Made at Night (1999)
- Talossa on Saatana (1999)
- Hurmaava joukkoitsemurha (2000)
- Rumble (2002)
- Bad Boys (2003; Finnish: Pahat pojat)
- Uuno Turhapuro – This Is My Life (2004)
- Shadow of the Eagle (2005; Finnish: Kaksipäisen kotkan varjossa)
- The Storage (2011)
- Road North (2012)
- Elämältä kaiken sain (2015)
- Master Cheng (2019)

== See also ==
- List of best-selling music artists in Finland

Preceded by Katri Helena with Katson sineen taivaan	Finland in the Eurovision Song Contest; 1980	Succeeded by Riki Sorsa with Reggae OK
