= List of Finnish films of the 1970s =

A list of films produced in Finland ordered by year of release. For an alphabetical list of Finnish films see Category:Finnish films

Title	Director	Cast	Genre	Notes
1970
Akseli and Elina	Edvin Laine	Aarno Sulkanen, Ulla Eklund, Risto Taulo	Drama	Entered into the 7th Moscow International Film Festival
Anna	Jörn Donner	Harriet Andersson, Pertti Melasniemi, Marja Packalén	Erotic comedy	
Portraits of Women	Jörn Donner	Jörn Donner, Ritva Vepsä	Erotic comedy	
The Headquarters	Matti Kassila	Joel Rinne, Jussi Jurkka	War drama	
Jussi Pussi	Ere Kokkonen	Vesa-Matti Loiri, Leena Brusiin, Simo Salminen	Comedy	
Speedy Gonzales – noin 7 veljeksen poika	Ere Kokkonen	Spede Pasanen, Tarja Markus, Pertti Melasniemi	Comedy	
1971
Perkele! Kuvia Suomesta	Jörn Donner, Jaakko Talaskivi, Erkki Seiro	Jörn Donner	Documentary	
Aatamin puvussa ja vähän Eevankin	Matti Kassila	Heikki Kinnunen, Juha Hyppönen	Comedy	
Kahdeksas veljes	Spede Pasanen	Vesa-Matti Loiri, Spede Pasanen, Tarja Markus	Comedy	
Saatanan radikaalit	Heikki Huopainen	Paavo Piironen, Heikki Nousiainen	Comedy	
The Song of the Blood-Red Flower	Mikko Niskanen	Pertti Melasniemi	Drama	
The Unhanged	Spede Pasanen, Vesa-Matti Loiri	Spede Pasanen, Vesa-Matti Loiri, Simo Salminen	Western comedy	
1972
Eight Deadly Shots	Mikko Niskanen	Mikko Niskanen, Tarja-Tuulikki Tarsala, Paavo Pentikäinen	Drama	
The Sheep Eaters	Seppo Huunonen	Heikki Kinnunen, Leo Lastumäki	Comedy	
1973
Uuno Turhapuro	Ere Kokkonen	Vesa-Matti Loiri, Marjatta Raita, Spede Pasanen	Comedy	
The Earth Is a Sinful Song	Rauni Mollberg	Maritta Viitamäki, Pauli Jauhojärvi, Aimo Saukko	Drama	Entered into the 24th Berlin International Film Festival
Meiltähän tämä käy	Matti Kassila	Esa Pakarinen, Kauko Helovirta, Kirsti Ortola	Comedy	
Sensuela	Teuvo Tulio	Marianne Mardi, Mauritz Åkerman, Ossi Elstelä	Erotic drama	
1974
The Hair	Seppo Huunonen	Mikko Majanlahti, Arja Virtanen, Pauli Virtanen,	Erotic thriller	
Viu-hah hah-taja	Ere Kokkonen		Comedy	
1975
The Dabster	Veikko Kerttula	Ahti Kuoppala, Pekka Räty	Comedy drama	Made-for-television film
Home for Christmas	Jaakko Pakkasvirta	Paavo Pentikäinen, Irma Martinkauppi, Kaisa Martinkauppi	Drama	Entered into the 9th Moscow International Film Festival
Professori Uuno D.G. Turhapuro	Ere Kokkonen	Vesa-Matti Loiri, Spede Pasanen	Comedy	
1976
Antti the Treebranch	Katariina Lahti, Heikki Partanen, Riitta Rautoma	Markku Blomqvist, Pertti Hilkamo, Maritta Viitamäki	Drama	Entered into the 10th Moscow International Film Festival
Lottovoittaja UKK Turhapuro	Ere Kokkonen	Vesa-Matti Loiri	Comedy	
1977
Aika hyvä ihmiseksi	Rauni Mollberg	Olavi Ahonen, Lauri Arajuuri	Historical	6 wins; music was performed by Asser Fagerström
Häpy Endkö? Eli kuinka Uuno Turhapuro sai niin kauniin ja rikkaan vaimon	Ere Kokkonen	Vesa-Matti Loiri	Comedy	
People Not as Bad as They Seem	Rauni Mollberg	Olavi Ahonen, Lauri Arajuuri, Ossi Aronen	Drama	
The Year of the Hare	Risto Jarva	Antti Litja, Kauko Helovirta	Drama	2 wins
1978
The Guarded Village 1944	Timo Linnasalo	Raimo Grönberg, Markku Huhtamo, Kaija Kangas	Drama	
Poet and Muse	Jaakko Pakkasvirta	Esko Salminen, Katja Salminen, Elina Salo	Drama	Entered into the 11th Moscow International Film Festival
Rautakauppias Uuno Turhapuro - presidentin vävy	Ere Kokkonen	Vesa-Matti Loiri	Comedy	
1979
Herr Puntila and His Servant Matti	Ralf Långbacka	Lasse Pöysti, Pekka Laiho, Arja Saijonmaa	Drama	
Koeputkiaikuinen ja Simon enkelit (The Test-tube Adult and Simo's Angels)	Spede Pasanen	Spede Pasanen, Vesa-Matti Loiri	Comedy	
Wonderman	Antti Peippo	Antti Litja, Martti Pennanen	Scifi comedy	
