= Vesku Show =

- Genre: Sketch comedy
- Written by: Vesa-Matti Loiri
- Directed by: Inkeri Pilkama
- Starring: Vesa-Matti Loiri; Hannele Lauri; Simo Salminen; Juha Muje
- Country of origin: Finland
- No. of episodes: 31

Production
- Producer: Spede Pasanen
- Running time: 40–55 minutes
- Production company: Spede-Yhtiöt

Original release
- Network: MTV3
- Release: 25 January 1988 – 22 April 1991

Vesku Show is a Finnish television series that aired from 1988 to 1991. It was written by Vesa-Matti “Vesku” Loiri and directed by Inkeri Pilkama. The show was produced by Spede-Yhtiöt for MTV3. It aired monthly on Mondays from 7:30 to 8:30 PM. Vesku Show was popular, with peak viewership exceeding 1.6 million. The series was rerun for the first time in 2009.

== Development ==
Spede Pasanen created and produced the Spede Show from 1984 to 1987, featuring Vesa-Matti Loiri among the cast. After four years, Pasanen decided to end the show, citing fatigue with sketch comedy. He offered Loiri the opportunity to create his own one-hour monthly show, with full creative control. Loiri accepted, and the final Spede Show of 1987 humorously depicted a fictional disagreement between Pasanen and Loiri, serving as a handover.

Loiri and Pilkama designed the show to feature seamless transitions between sketches, often shot in one take. Each episode began with Loiri performing a song before donning a costume and entering the first sketch. Vesku Show debuted in January 1988.

== Cast ==
- Vesa-Matti Loiri
- Simo Salminen
- Hannele Lauri
- Juha Muje (from episode 7)
- Eija Vilpas (episodes 6–23)
- Olli Ahvenlahti, musical director (episodes 1–23)
- Peter Lerche, musical director (from episode 22)

== Guest appearances ==
- Vesa Vierikko (episodes 2 and 8)
- Jukka-Pekka Palo (episode 3)
- Eija Vilpas (guest in episode 4 before becoming a regular)
- Jope Ruonansuu (episode 5)
- Ville Virtanen (episode 14)
- Spede Pasanen (episodes 1, 2, and cameo roles in later episodes)

== Popular sketches and characters ==
Returning from Spede Show were fan favorites like:

- Tyyne Lipasti – a newsreader and performer seeking more prominence.
- Jean-Pierre Kusela – a singer with comedic duets, including "Tahdon olla sulle hellä."
- Nasse-setä – a drunken children's TV host.
- Sportscaster Vode and Baron Münchausen.

Original characters included:

- Sulo and Lennart – bilingual twin brothers telling jokes.
- Pultti Pizza Guy – a comedic fast-food worker.
- Kepa and Jorte – a couple from Karjala who are often bickering.
- The musical group The Visualitz, featuring Loiri as "Sepi."

Sketches were set in various locations such as parks, studios, or restaurants. The series also parodied beauty contests and classic Christmas performances.

== Episodes ==
A total of 31 episodes were aired between 1988 and 1991.

== Music ==
Each episode featured live musical performances, with Loiri often singing classic hits. Musical accompaniment was provided by Olli Ahvenlahti and later Peter Lerche.

== Home media ==
In 2006, the first DVD collection, Vesku Show – Pimpeli Pom, was released, featuring all 1988 episodes. Subsequent releases covered later seasons, culminating in a 2013 compilation with previously unreleased episodes.
