= Venla (disambiguation) =

Venla may refer to:

- Venla (given name)
- Venla award, Finnish TV award (1982-2010)
- Venla relay, women's orienteering relay race, Finland
- Golden Venla, Finnish TV award (awarded since 2011)

== See also ==
- Venlafaxine
