= Pojat =

Pojat, the Finnish word for boys, may refer to:

== Arts and entertainment ==
- Pojat (film) (The Boys), a 1962 Finnish film by Mikko Niskanen
- Pojat (novel), a 1958 novel by Finnish author Paavo Rintala
- Pahat pojat (Bad Boys), a 2003 Finnish film directed by Aleksi Mäkelä
- Skavabölen pojat (The boys from Skavaböle), a 2009 Finnish drama film

== Sports ==
- Kaarinan Pojat (also known as KaaPo), a football club based in Kaarina, Finland
- Torpan Pojat (also known as ToPo), a basketball club based in Helsinki, Finland

== See also ==
- Pojate, a village in the municipality of Ćićevac, Serbia
