= Hannele Lauri =

Finnish actress (born 1952)

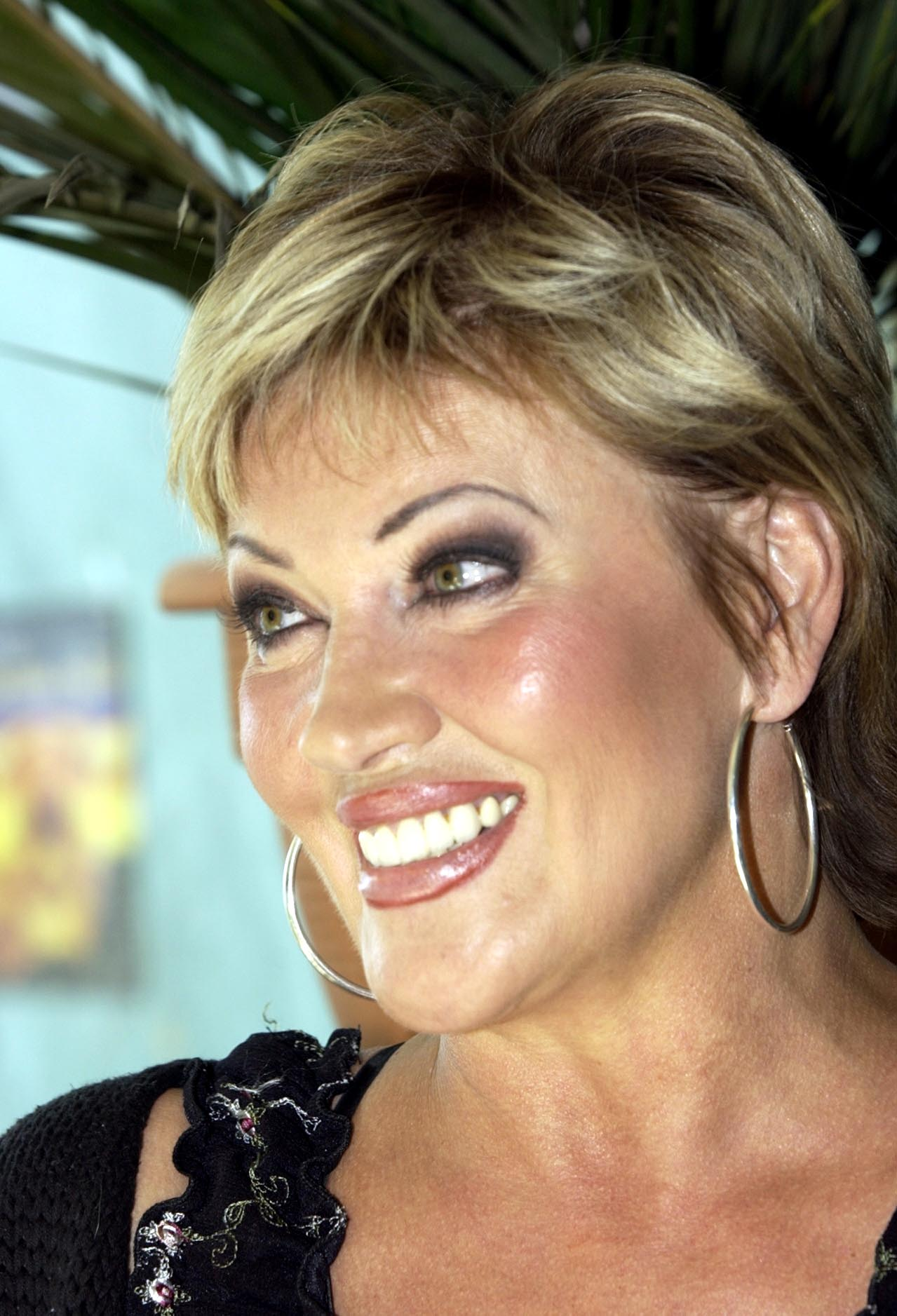
- Tampere Theatre staff - Hannele Lauri.jpg
- Born: Hannele Markkula; 21 July 1952 (age 73); Tampere, Finland
- Occupation: Actress

Ritva Hannele Lauri (born 21 July 1952 in Tampere, Finland) is a Finnish actress best known for her roles in several comedy series. While much of her recognition comes from her television work, her main focus has always been on stage acting.

== Early life ==
Hannele Lauri was born Ritva Hannele Markkula to Arvi Markkula, an officer born in Kuhmalahti in 1918, and Eine Poutanen, originally from Karelia. Her parents met in Tampere on the eve of the Winter War, after Poutanen's family had been evacuated from Vyborg to Tampere. At the time, Poutanen had a daughter, Beritta, from a previous relationship. Markkula and Poutanen married in 1951, and Hannele was born the following year. Markkula adopted Beritta, and the family grew in 1958 with the birth of Pertti. The family lived in Hämeenlinna before moving back to Tampere in 1959. Arvi and Eine divorced in 1971.

== Education and early career ==
After completing her studies at the Helsinki Theatre Academy, Lauri began her professional career in 1975 at the Jyväskylä City Theatre, where she worked until 1977. From 1977 to 1981, she was a freelance actor before moving to the Turku City Theatre. In 1983, she joined the Helsinki City Theatre, where she had a long career until her retirement in 2015.

Her early theatrical roles included Ophelia in Hamlet. During her early years, she also appeared in films directed by Risto Jarva and Jaakko Pakkasvirta.

== Career ==
=== Stage career ===
Lauri’s career at the Helsinki City Theatre spanned over three decades. She became known for her versatility and ability to perform in both serious and comedic roles. Notable productions during her time there include:

- The Balcony (1985)
- The Taming of the Shrew (1987)
- Eteisiin ja kynnyksille (1991)
- All about Eve (2000)
- Vagina Monologues (2002)

Lauri also made guest appearances at several other theatres, including the Tampere Theatre and the Espoo City Theatre. Her later work continued to demonstrate her strong stage presence and dedication to her craft.

=== Film career ===
Lauri made her film debut with supporting roles in the dramas Luottamus (1976) and Loma (1976). She became a household name through her comedic roles in several Uuno Turhapuro films, including Uuno Turhapuro armeijan leivissä (1984) and the final instalment of the series, Uuno Turhapuro – This Is My Life (2004).

Her first leading film role came much later in her career with the film 70 Is Just a Number (2021), where she portrayed the fictional schlager star Seija Kuula.

=== Television career ===
Lauri gained national fame in the 1980s through her collaboration with Spede Pasanen. She appeared regularly in the Spede Show (1984–1987), Vesku Show (1988-1991) and later starred in the comedy series Hynttyyt yhteen (1991–1995), which was viewed by over a million Finnish viewers weekly.

In addition to comedy, Lauri also took on dramatic television roles. She starred as Dr. Tiina Kouranka in the medical drama Ihmeidentekijät (1996–1998) and its sequel series Parhaat vuodet (2000–2002). More recently, she appeared as a tour guide in the series Keihäsmatkat (2020), which humorously depicted Finnish holiday culture.

== Awards ==
Lauri has received numerous accolades, including:

- The Actor's Union's Golden Badge of Merit (2001)
- The Concrete Jussi for Lifetime Achievement (2019)
- The Golden Venla for lifetime achievements (2019)

== Bibliography ==
Two biographies have been published about Lauri:

- Diiva – Hannele Laurin tarina by Teemu Rinne (2013)
- Hannele, näyttelijä by Panu Rajala (2021)

== Personal life ==
She married actor Hannu Lauri in 1976, with whom she had two sons, Sami (born 1977) and Tomi (born 1979). The couple divorced in 1994. In the early 2000s, she had a brief marriage to Teemu Rinne.
