= Jean-Pierre Kusela =

Jean-Pierre Kusela is a fictional character invented by Spede Pasanen and played by Vesa-Matti Loiri, appearing in the Finnish sketch comedy series Spede Show from 1985 to 1987. The character also appeared in Vesku Show from 1988 to 1991.

== Appearances ==
Jean-Pierre Kusela became famous with his song Naurava kulkuri ("The laughing tramp"), a cover version of Jim Lowe's song Gambler’s Guitar that was published by German singer Fred Bertelmann (under the Der lachende Vagabund, The laughing Vagabond) in 1957. The song became so popular that Vesa-Matti Loiri published it on his 1986 album Naurava kulkuri, under the Kusela name. The album sold 92 thousand copies. It received a platinum record award in 1987, and is one of the 60 most sold ever Finnish albums in Finland. In 1987 Loiri published another album, Voi hyvä tavaton ("Oh my goodness"), which sold 25 thousand copies, receiving a gold record award. In 1988, Kusela appeared on the Tyyne album Pim peli pom. They performed the song "Tahdon olla sulle hellä" together. In 1995 Loiri published a CD single Nauravan kulkurin paluu ("The return of the laughing tramp"), which included a remix version of the original 1986 song.

Jean-Pierre Kusela appeared in November 2001 in the Spede Pasanen memorial concert at the Hartwall Arena. The concert was broadcast on MTV3 in December 2001. Kusela's last appearance was in the 2004 film Uuno Turhapuro - This Is My Life.

== Concept ==
The character is a parody of typical French smooth-voiced chanson singers, particularly Jean-Claude Pascal, whose surname - like that of Kusela - has a connotation of toilet humour. ("Pascal" sounds like "paska", Finnish for "shit", and hence the name Kusela comes from "kusi", Finnish for "piss".)

Jean-Pierre Kusela is a big-nosed, dark-haired and dark-bearded night club singer speaking Finnish in a foreign accent. In a typical Kusela sketch, the character performed his songs smoking cigarettes and drinking alcoholic beverages while the Swedish pianist Puppe (Olli Ahvenlahti) accompanied him with piano music.

== Discography ==
- Naurava kulkuri (1986)
- Voi hyvä tavaton (1987)

== Singles ==
- Nauravan kulkurin paluu (1995)
