= Eino Leino 2 =

Studio album by Vesa-Matti Loiri
- Released: 1980
- Length: 39:10
- Language: Finnish
- Label: Gold Disc
- Producer: Levytuottajat

Vesa-Matti Loiri (Eino Leino series) chronology
Eino Leino (1978)	Eino Leino 2 (1980)	Eino Leino 3 (1985)

Eino Leino 2 is a 1980 studio album by Finnish musician Vesa-Matti Loiri. All the songs are based on poems by the Finnish national poet Eino Leino, with the music composed by Perttu Hietanen and Taisto Wesslin.

The album has sold more than 50,000 copies and was certified gold in 1980 and platinum in 1987.

== Track listing ==
All lyrics are written by Eino Leino; all music is composed by Perttu Hietanen & Taisto Wesslin

No.	Title	Length
1.	"Löysäläisen Laulu"	05:31
2.	"Minust Oli Kuin Olisi Soudettu"	02:56
3.	"Erotessa"	02:51
4.	"Maininkeja"	02:53
5.	"Hymni Tulelle"	05:13
6.	"Virta Venhettä Vie"	04:07
7.	"Ikävöi, Ihminen"	04:50
8.	"Painuva Päivä"	05:18
9.	"Se Kuitenkin Liikkuu!"	05:33
Total length:		39:10
