= Näköradiomiehen ihmeelliset siekailut =

- DVD cover
- Directed by: Ere Kokkonen
- Written by: Spede Pasanen; Jukka Virtanen; Ere Kokkonen
- Produced by: Spede Pasanen
- Starring: Spede Pasanen; Vesa-Matti Loiri; Simo Salminen; Leo Jokela
- Distributed by: Filmituotanto Spede Pasanen Ky
- Release date: 1969
- Running time: 1h 27min
- Country: Finland
- Language: Finnish

Näköradiomiehen ihmeelliset siekailut (English: The Marvellous Adventures of a TV Man) is a 1969 Finnish comedy by Spede Pasanen. It features one of the most famous appearances by Vesa-Matti Loiri outside his Uuno Turhapuro persona also created by Pasanen. The film also features a famous cameo of the Finnish pop-star Danny.

The film is often considered one of Spede's greatest, due to its human-story. It also features plenty of his zany comedy most of which takes place in Pasanen's character's fantasies (reflected off the sets at which he is working).

== Plot ==
The plot concerns the character of Mikko Syvärivi (Pasanen) who works as a night-watchman and also becomes an assistant at a Finnish Television Company. His first day at work starts out quite humorously as he is mistaken as a minister in the Finnish parliament by an urging reporter Antti Vasa (Loiri) who takes him to a live TV-interview. Unfortunately due to the incident Vasa is demoted in to reporting on indifferent news-items with a minimal news-crew and often allowed to ask one question.

Mikko on the other hand is also an urging writer who tries his luck comprising a comedy-show and even a police-drama. After catching Vasa breaking into a store in the middle of the night (in the hopes of covering the actions of the local police) he decides to help Vasa with his reports eventually getting him back on the show where started out.

Mikko also tries to impress a girl at the cafeteria and is even offered to stay at her (all girl) dormitory.

At the latter half of the movie Vasa turns Mikko's bumbling in to a hit comedy-act which comprises him of injuring himself on various types of doors. The fame naturally gets to him in the end and ruins his relationship with the cafeteria girl. He also sabotages his own success by going on stage with a new gag which is met with a chilling silence as the audience leaves. Mikko then goes back to being just an assistant but seems content with the outcome by the end of the film.

== Production ==
Simo Salminen plays himself in the role of a popular TV-comedian, parodying Spede. In the film, he has his own comedy-show called Simovisio, a reference to Spede's own show Spedevisio.

Ilkka Lipsanen, credited by his stage-name Danny, appears in the film. He performed the role of the singing and narrating bard in Spede's Noin 7 Veljestä. Jukka Virtanen wrote the lyrics for the soundtrack. He also appears in the film's fictional live-broadcast play Rohkea Roomalainen (The Brave Roman - actually, a fragment of Shakespeare's Julius Caesar) as Brutus. Director Ere Kokkonen also cameos as a TV director in the film.

Correctly translated the film's title is The Amazing Hesitations of the TV-man. Näköradio (vision radio) is an outdated expression for television. Siekailut comes from siekailla, an old word meaning to hesitate and which sounds a lot like seikkailu, meaning adventure.
