= Speedy Gonzales (disambiguation) =

Speedy Gonzales is an animated cartoon mouse.

Speedy Gonzales or Speedy Gonzalez may also refer to:

- Speedy Gonzales (film), a 1955 Merrie Melodies animated short film
- "Speedy Gonzales" (song), a 1961 song, popularized in the US as a 1962 single by Pat Boone
- Speedy Gonzales - noin 7 veljeksen poika, a Finnish western comedy directed by Ere Kokkonen
- Mark Gonzalez, Chilean footballer nicknamed "Speedy Gonzalez"
