= Road North (film) =

- Film poster
- Finnish: Tie pohjoiseen
- Directed by: Mika Kaurismäki
- Starring: Vesa-Matti Loiri; Samuli Edelmann
- Release date: 24 August 2012
- Running time: 110 minutes
- Country: Finland
- Language: Finnish
- Budget: €848,000

Road North (Finnish: Tie pohjoiseen) is a 2012 Finnish comedy film directed by Mika Kaurismäki. The film is about Leo Porola who meets his son Timo after a long time. They take a long trip to Lapland, and during the journey, the father and son talk about their past and future and meet different people.

The film won the Audience Award at the Saint Petersburg International Film Festival.

== Cast ==
- Vesa-Matti Loiri as Leo Porola
- Samuli Edelmann as Timo Porola
- Peter Franzén as Pertti Paakku
- Krista Kosonen as Elina
- Irina Björklund as Tiia
- Leena Uotila as Margit
- Eija Vilpas as Birgit
- Pertti Sveholm as Keke
- Irina Pulkka as Sanni
- Mari Perankoski as Minna Paakku
