= The Unhanged =

- Original Finnish film poster
- Directed by: Spede Pasanen; Vesa-Matti Loiri
- Written by: Spede Pasanen
- Produced by: Spede Pasanen
- Starring: Vesa-Matti Loiri; Simo Salminen; Spede Pasanen; Pirjo Laitila; Olavi Ahonen
- Cinematography: Kari Sohlberg
- Edited by: Taina Kanth; Irma Taina
- Music by: Jaakko Salo
- Distributed by: Filmituotanto Spede Pasanen
- Release date: 1971
- Running time: 85 minutes
- Country: Finland
- Language: Finnish

The Unhanged (Finnish: Hirttämättömät) is a 1971 Finnish western comedy film directed by Spede Pasanen and Vesa-Matti Loiri. It is the sequel to the 1970 film Speedy Gonzales - noin 7 veljeksen poika. In addition to featuring Pasanen and Loiri (originally set to appear in Speedy Gonzales, but unable to appear due to an injury), the film also stars Pasanen's other stock actors, such as Simo Salminen and Olavi Ahonen. The two main characters are parody versions of The Lone Ranger and his sidekick Tonto.

The film was released the same year as Kahdeksas veljes and Saatanan Radikaalit (which Spede only produced). None of the films were box-office successes leading Spede to not release any movies the following year. Regardless, Spede won a joint producer's Jussi Award for his efforts.

Based on the film, a remake by the same name directed and starring Andrei Alén was released in 2022.

== Synopsis ==
The Lonely Rider (Loiri) and his Indian sidekick Tonto (Salminen) have captured the outlaw Speedy Gonzales (Pasanen), a ruthless gunfighter from the town of Njietponimaistadi. They embark to the town for the reward. After riding through the desert, without water, and fighting against Indians, they discover their heroism has brought them back, full circle.

== Cast ==
- Vesa-Matti Loiri as The Lonely Rider (Lone Ranger)
- Simo Salminen as Tonto
- Spede Pasanen as Speedy Gonzales
- Pirjo Laitila as Margareta Smith
- Olavi Ahonen as Bartender/Sheriff

== Production ==
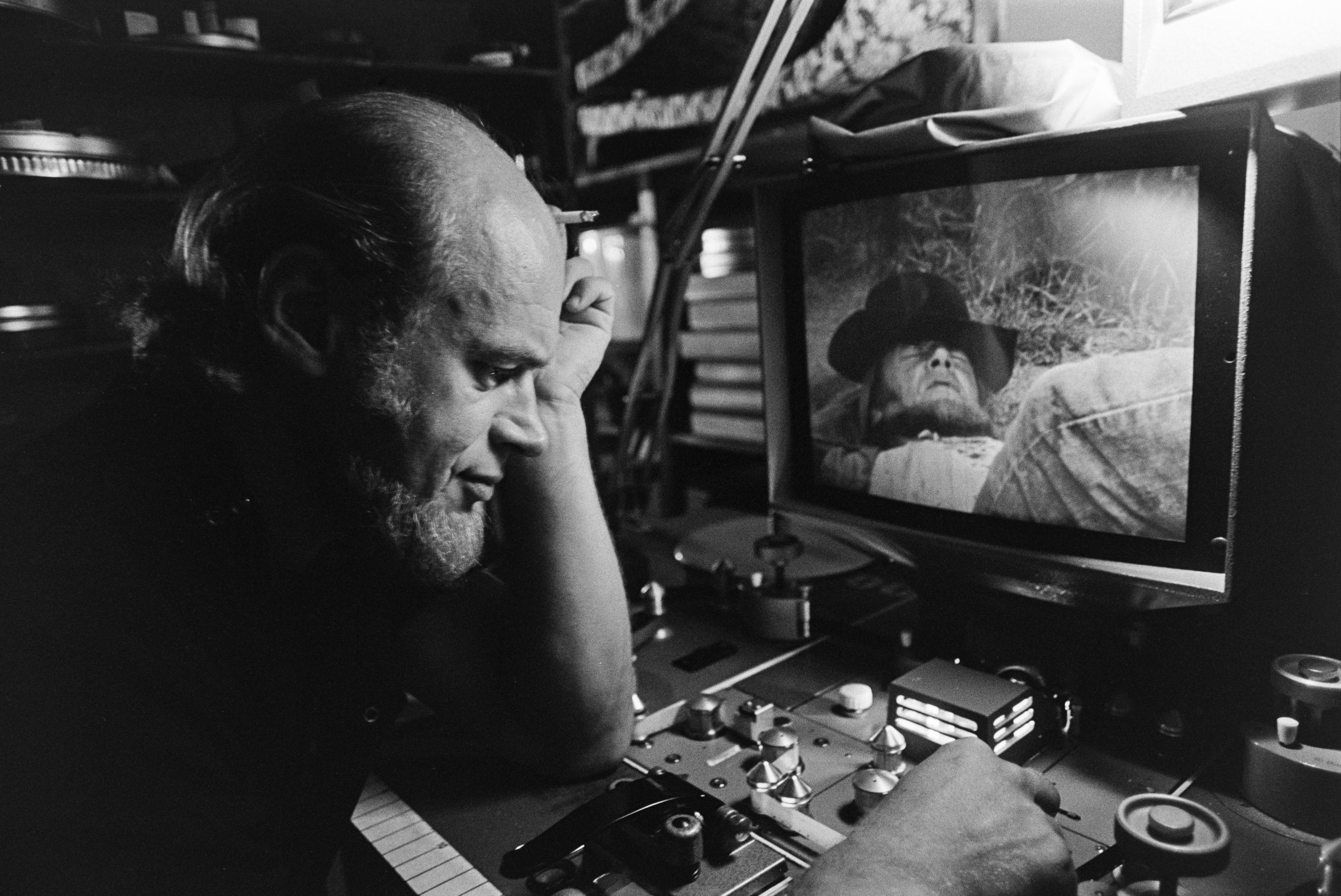
Spede Pasanen editing the film in 1971

The film was one of the rare instances during Spede's early career when the Finnish Film Foundation provided financing for the film in the form of a grant. However, the grant was originally meant for an unproduced film called Kauhukakara, then re-allocated when Speedy Gonzales became a hit in 1970. The movie re-uses the Western village sets of the first film (having been previously repurposed from the sketch show Kivikasvot).

Following a theme from the first movie, the film pokes fun at the conventions of Western films and figures. The Lonely Rider and Tonto are takes on The Lone Ranger and his similarly named sidekick. The film is stylistically very different from Speedy Gonzales, being considerably more tongue-in-cheek and features a smaller cast. The music was again produced by Jaakko Salo, but featuring a less guitar-heavy score. Jukka Virtanen did not return to produce the music. Olavi Ahonen, who played the bar-tender and undertaker in the first film, returns in a self-referential appearance as a Bartender and Sheriff, who also claims to be a "county clerk, pimp and midwife".
