= Eino Leino (album) =

Studio album by Vesa-Matti Loiri
- Released: 1978
- Length: 34:21
- Language: Finnish
- Label: Gold Disc
- Producer: Levytuottajat

Vesa-Matti Loiri (Eino Leino series) chronology
Eino Leino (1978)	Eino Leino 2 (1980)

Eino Leino is a 1978 studio album by Finnish musician Vesa-Matti Loiri. All the songs are composed, by Perttu Hietanen and Taisto Wesslin, to poems by the Finnish national poet Eino Leino.

The album has sold approximately 120,000 copies; it was certified gold and platinum in 1980, and double-platinum in 1985. It is considered to be Loiri's breakthrough album.

The album is the first of a set of four: vol. 2 was released in 1980, vol. 3 in 1985, and vol. 4 ("Päivän laskiessa") in 2001.

== Track listing ==
All lyrics are written by Eino Leino; all music is composed by Perttu Hietanen & Taisto Wesslin.

No.	Title	Length
1.	"Höyhensaaret"	04:28
2.	"Elegia"	04:02
3.	"Tulkaa Kotiin"	03:48
4.	"Ja Vuodet Ne Käy"	02:10
5.	"Laulajan Laulu"	02:48
6.	"Nocturne"	03:38
7.	"Väinämöisen Laulu"	03:20
8.	"Hautalaulu"	02:32
9.	"Kun Muistelen"	03:22
10.	"Lapin Kesä"	04:31
Total length:		34:21

== See also ==
- List of best-selling albums in Finland
