= Sincerely Yours in Cold Blood =

Finnish crime drama television series

- Genre: Crime drama Police procedural
- Starring: Ville Virtanen; Antti Reini; Leena Uotila; Meri Nenonen; Jukka Kärkkäinen; Kalle Holmberg; Outi Mäenpää; Kari Väänänen; Katariina Kaitue; Petri Manninen; Esko Nikkari
- Country of origin: Finland
- Original language: Finnish
- No. of seasons: 3
- No. of episodes: 30

Production
- Running time: 45 minutes
- Production companies: PetFilms (1st season); Solar Films

Original release
- Network: Nelonen
- Release: 29 February 2000 – 29 November 2005

Sincerely Yours in Cold Blood (Finnish: Kylmäverisesti sinun) is a Finnish crime drama television series that aired on Nelonen from 29 February 2000 to 29 November 2005. All of its 30 episodes are based on true crime cases.

== Cast ==
- Ville Virtanen as Veli Miettinen
- Leena Uotila as Mailis Santala
- Antti Reini as T.T. Mikkonen
- Outi Mäenpää as Päivi Miettinen
- Meri Nenonen as Mira Kataja
- Esko Nikkari as a pathologist
- Kari Väänänen as Kalevi Repo
