= 70 Is Just a Number =

- 70 on vain numero
- Directed by: Johanna Vuoksenmaa
- Written by: Johanna Vuoksenmaa
- Produced by: Riina Hyytiä; Nina Laurio
- Cinematography: Heikki Färm
- Edited by: Jojo Erholtz
- Music by: Kerkko Koskinen
- Production company: Dionysos Films
- Release date: December 29, 2021 (Finland)
- Running time: 102 minutes
- Country: Finland
- Language: Finnish
- Budget: €1.5 million

70 Is Just a Number (Finnish: 70 on vain numero) is a 2021 Finnish comedy film written and directed by Johanna Vuoksenmaa. The film stars Hannele Lauri as Seija Kuula, a nearly 70-year-old Finnish pop diva who becomes romantically involved with a guitarist 25 years her junior.

The film serves as the final installment in Vuoksenmaa's trilogy of relationship-focused films, following 21 Ways to Ruin a Marriage (2013) and Adult Camp (2015). While the earlier films targeted younger audiences, 70 Is Just a Number shifts focus to aging and loneliness.

== Plot ==
Seija Kuula, a nearly 70-year-old Finnish pop diva, falls in love with Lauri, a guitarist 25 years her junior. When Lauri expresses his desire to become a father, Seija introduces her stylist, Shanella, as a potential surrogate mother. However, Shanella has her own conditions for agreeing with the plan.

== Cast ==
- Hannele Lauri as Seija Kuula
- Mikko Nousiainen as Lauri
- Misa Palander as Shanella
- Marja Packalén as Mirre
- Juha Torvinen as Klaus
- Paula Vesala as herself

== Production ==
The film was primarily shot in Tampere, Finland, during March and summer 2020. The film's budget was €1.5 million, with €775,000 provided by the Finnish Film Foundation.

The singing voice of Seija Kuula was provided by Finnish singer Lea Laven.

== Release and reception ==
Originally scheduled for release on January 6, 2021, the premiere of 70 Is Just a Number was delayed due to restrictions caused by the COVID-19 pandemic. The premiere was eventually held in a staggered fashion across Finland starting on December 29, 2021.

=== Critical response ===
70 Is Just a Number received mixed to positive reviews from critics, with praise for Hannele Lauri's performance and the film's exploration of its themes, though some criticized its reliance on clichés. Episodi awarded the film 4 out of 5 stars, highlighting its warmth and Lauri's acting. Helsingin Sanomat rated the film 3 out of 5 stars, describing it as humorous but uneven. In contrast, Katso gave the film 2 out of 5 stars, criticizing its predictable storytelling.

=== Awards ===
Award	Category	Recipient	Result
Jussi	Best Actress	Hannele Lauri	Nominated
Jussi	Best Supporting Actress	Marja Packalén	Won
