= Vääpeli Körmy =

Fictional character

Vääpeli Körmy (Sergeant Major Körmy; Finnish pronunciation: [ˈkørmy]) is a character played by famed Finnish comedian Heikki Kinnunen in a series of five Finnish comedies released between 1990 and 1997, as well as in a cameo appearance in Uuno Turhapuro herra Helsingin herra. The films each parody aspects of the Finnish Defense Forces but also Finland's international relations, its presidents and various political and social aspects of Finnish life.

The films take primarily place in the fictional sissi garrison in Räyhäranta. Being unrealistically small for a standard Finnish garrison it only houses one of each rank of officer between Sergeant Major (Körmy) and Colonel (Tossavainen), as well a group of four corporals who start off as privates in the first film of the series.

The films have also included a bizarre element of foreshadowing two real-life events that both occurred in 1995. The first film features a joke of Finland winning the Ice Hockey World Championships against the USSR. Finland would eventually win the championship in 1995. Also two films in the series poked fun at the idea of women joining the military. In 1995, women were allowed to serve voluntarily in the military.

== Körmy ==
The character Körmy describes himself as "the meanest bastard of a Sergeant Major" to the privates in the first film. His very presence and voice seems to incite fear in those who rank below him. However, Körmy's ire tends to rise more from the privates' own actions, such as private (later corporal) Friman who continually uses Körmy's office to conduct his personal business ventures. Körmy is also prone to playing practical jokes on his privates, some of which could be classified as hazing. However, many of his pranks also backfire instead making Körmy seem like a fool in the eyes of others.

At times Körmy is also the subject of simple rotten luck, such as when his parked army jeep slid down hill and pushed a row of cars into the Gulf of Finland.

Körmy can however be extremely soft-spoken at times. Sometimes for the sheer gag effect but also genuinely towards higher-ranking officers and especially his wife. Körmy is also quick to take action and is generally displayed as being far more competent than most of the officers that outrank him in Räyhäranta. For instance he was quick to track down spies who stole the briefcase of the Defence Minister. He also later tricked the said spies when they tried to intercept an American contact wearing a bowler hat on a cruise liner, by somehow having several of the other guests wear bowler hats as well.

However, Körmy's initiative has also turned against him when he once chased a man onto a train believing him to be a bank-robber and who then turned out to be the bank's manager.

== Recurring characters ==
=== Soldiers in Räyhäranta ===
- Corporal Hakkarainen (Pekka Huotari) - Starting out as a private in the first film, Hakkarainen (for reasons unknown) remains as a corporal at Räyhäranta for the remaining films. He is often made a fool of by Körmy and the other characters. He has been discharged between the fourth and fifth film but called back into action when the Räyhäranta garrison gets moved to Helsinki as a part of an urban combat exercise.
- Corporal Sulonen (Pertti Koivula) - Starting out as a private in the first film. He is Körmy's son, however, Körmy apparently has so little love for him that he is forced to use his maiden name instead (against the common marital practice, Körmy adopted his wife's last name). He appears in the first two films before being called back into action in the fifth film.
- Corporal Friman (Jukka Puotila) - Started off as a private in the first film. Despite having a seemingly successful business as a real-estate broker he remains as a corporal in the military. He is also a masterful imitator of voices (often impersonating Körmy on the phone) and often the ire of Körmy due to his quirky personality. Also discharged between the fourth and fifth films and returns in the fifth film.
- Corporal Hönö (Santeri Kinnunen) - A cheery corporal who first appeared in the third film and is called back into service in the fifth. Actor Santeri Kinnunen is the son of Heikki Kinnunen.
- Guardsman Räikkönen (Jani Volanen) - The guardsman who is often tricked by the soldiers who want or need to sneak off the garrison. He remains the guard of Räyhäranta in all of the movies except Taisteluni where, due to the Finnish military being laid off, he temporarily guards the encampment of a Swedish garrison. In the fifth film he has been discharged but ends up standing guard for the female soldiers' garrison that Körmy's men have to invade as a part of an urban war exercise.

=== Officers in Räyhäranta ===
- Second Lieutenant (Nappula/Napero) Pienimäki (Tom Pöysti) – The unlucky Second Lieutenant who continually tries to get his authority recognised by Körmy and others but is constantly ignored. Along with his wife (played by Eija Vilpas), they also form a comedic depiction of an unhappy and disagreeable Finnish marriage. Pienimäki has artistic tendencies and takes part in amateur theatre. In most of the films he is often plagued by terrible luck.
- Captain Y.Y.A. Kuortti (Vesa Vierikko) – The inept and eccentric Captain who obsesses over being promoted to Major. He later marries Lieutenant Sievänen, with whom he falls madly in love during her first appearance in the third movie. He also has an affinity for poetry and often quotes famous poets, though altering them to better fit the current situation.
- Lieutenant Anni Maria Sievänen (Mari Vainio) – She joins the sissi garrison in Räyhäranta in the third movie and immediately becomes the center of attention for Captain Kuortti. She initially leads the group of women that Körmy must give sissi training and later begins serving as a full-fledged officer. She doesn't have as many quirks as the other officers but did, as her first initiative, redecorate the officers' offices in the third movie, something which didn't go over well with Körmy.
- Colonel Tossavainen (Pentti Siimes) – An elderly officer who enjoys drinking and flirting with ladies. He is formally in charge of the garrison in Räyhäranta though rarely does anything other than inform of the current developments in the military organisation.

=== Others ===
- General Gustafson (Kalevi Kahra) - An extremely absent-minded general who is entirely reliant on his inept assistant, Major Hämärämaa. Gustafson has a tendency of forgetting official orders (which he himself has given) and even the details of his own war stories. Though he is said to have resigned from his post in the fourth movie he has apparently returned to his duties in the fifth film.
- Major Hämärämaa (Markku Huhtamo) - A dutiful but extremely inept Major who follows General Gustafson's orders to the letter without ever questioning their consequences.
- Samuli Edelmann portrays a different character in the first three films. He portrays private Iivanainen in the first, corporal Jyväntölä in the second and himself as corporal Edelmann in the third film.

== The films ==
- Vääpeli Körmy ja marsalkan sauva ("Sergeant Major Körmy and the Marshal's Staff") – 1990
- Vääpeli Körmy ja vetenalaiset vehkeet ("Sergeant Major Körmy and the Underwater Gadgets") – 1991
- Vääpeli Körmy ja etelän hetelmät ("Sergeant Major Körmy and the Fruits of the South") – 1992
- Vääpeli Körmy – taisteluni ("Sergeant Major Körmy: My Struggle") – 1994
- Vääpeli Körmy ja kahtesti laukeava ("Sergeant Major Körmy and the Double Trigger") – 1997
