= Fakta homma =

- Country of origin: Finland

Original release
- Network: Yle TV2
- Release: 1986 – 1998

Fakta homma is a Finnish comedy television series. It first aired on Finnish TV in 1986 and last aired in 1998.

== Cast ==
=== Main characters ===
- Eija Vilpas – Pirjo Kaasinen (1986–1998)
- Riitta Havukainen – Hannele Kaakko (1986–1998)
- Lasse Karkjärvi – Heikki Kaasinen (1986–1998)
- Taneli Mäkelä – Aulis Kaakko (1986–1998)

=== Other people ===
- Mikko Kivinen – Automotive distributor; Reima Helenius
- Jukka Puotila – Hairdresser
- Martti Suosalo – a neighbor, Asko
- Timo Torikka - furniture store salesperson
- Ville Virtanen – policeman and doorman

== See also ==
- List of Finnish television series
