= Sinna Virtanen =

Finnish playwright and dramaturge (born 1987)

Sinna Virtanen (born 1987) is a Finnish playwright and dramaturge. She finished her drama studies in 2015. Virtanen belongs to a Helsinki based collective that works on interface between science and arts concentrating on geography, archeology and geology, exploring methods to combine them with theatrical arts.

The primary focus of her career lies in theater including her works as a dramatist in several productions played on stage of the Finnish National Theatre. Sinna Virtanen has also worked with the nationally acknowledged Finnish ensemble theater Ryhmäteatteri.

Daughter to the comedienne Eija Vilpas and the award-winning method actor Ville Virtanen, she did several supporting roles in Finnish television series in the 1990s. Later on, she has played supporting roles in multiple feature films and short films. Sinna Virtanen has done the Finnish dubbing for the voice of Bellwether in the 2016 American comedy film Zootopia.
