= Spede Show =

- Genre: Sketch comedy
- Created by: Spede Pasanen
- Written by: Spede Pasanen
- Directed by: Inkeri Pilkama (1971–1987); Jukka Virtanen (1968–1970); Ere Kokkonen (1968–1970); Ilkka Linnasalmi, Juhani Kauppinen, Veikko Kerttula, Pekka Parikka (1964)
- Starring: Spede Pasanen; Simo Salminen; Vesa-Matti Loiri (1970–1987); Pentti Siimes (1971–1984)
- Composer: Olli Ahvenlahti
- Country of origin: Finland
- No. of seasons: Various
- No. of episodes: 119

Production
- Producer: Spede Pasanen
- Running time: 15–50 minutes
- Production company: MTV Oy / Oy Mainos-TV-Reklam Ab

Original release
- Network: Mainos-TV
- Release: 1964 – 1987

Spede Show was a Finnish sketch comedy series created by Spede Pasanen and aired on Mainos-TV between 1964 and 1987. The series featured prominent Finnish actors such as Spede Pasanen, Simo Salminen, Vesa-Matti Loiri, and Pentti Siimes. Known for its absurd humor and memorable characters, the show introduced iconic figures like Uuno Turhapuro and Nasse-setä. Spede Show won several television awards, including two Venla awards for "Funniest TV Show of the Year" in 1984 and 1985.

== Notable characters ==
- Uuno Turhapuro: Played by Vesa-Matti Loiri, Uuno became the series' most popular character, later spawning a successful film franchise.
- Nasse-setä: A children's show host with an aversion to children, portrayed by Loiri.
- Bluff Brothers: A comedic musical trio featuring Spede, Loiri, and Salminen.
- Pikkupojat: Played by Pasanen, Salminen, and Loiri as mischievous young boys.

== Awards ==
- Venla Award: Funniest TV Show of the Year (1984, 1985)
- Telvis Award: Best Entertainment Show (1984)
- Special honors for performances by Vesa-Matti Loiri and Simo Salminen.

== DVD releases ==
The series was released on DVD between 2005 and 2008, with collections spanning 1965 to 1987. Earlier episodes are incomplete due to lost archives.
