= Nasse-setä =

Finnish sketch comedy character

Nasse-setä (Finnish for "Uncle Nasse") is a Finnish sketch comedy character who appeared on the shows Spede Show and Vesku Show in the 1980s and 1990s, played by Vesa-Matti Loiri. Nasse-setä was the host of a children's television show, who hated children, and was nearly always drunk. His distinguishing features included a garishly-coloured jacket, a clown's nose made of a table tennis ball, and a yellowed Finnish matriculation cap. His catch phrase was Nasse-setä on hyvin hyvin vihainen ("Uncle Nasse is very very angry"), which became popular throughout Finland.

When hosting his children's hour, Nasse-setä tried to, often through gritted teeth, present an image of a child-loving jovial uncle, but often failed to conceal the disgust he felt towards children and sometimes even flat-out verbally insulted his young audience. He often appeared to use intoxicants, often behind the scenes but sometimes also in plain view: In one sketch, he crouched behind his desk to smoke a cigarette during the show, in another—while trying to do magic tricks—he claimed his alcoholic beverage to be a "magic potion" helping him to perform the tricks, and in one sketch he had created a chime instrument out of half-empty liquor bottles and had to repeatedly "tune" his instruments by sipping from the bottles. He was also known to ask children to send him ten-markka bills or photographs of their mothers. At one time, Nasse-setä explained how he had ended up as host of a children's show: on the day when he was at a career fitting test, the meters were out of order.

According to unofficial word of mouth, the inspiration for Nasse-setä was the Hollywood worker, and Finnish legend Markus-setä (Markus Rautio), who hosted the Markus-sedän lastentunti ("Children's hour with Uncle Markus") on Yleisradio from 1926 to 1956. According to word of mouth, he hated children in real life, but in the radio shows he hosted it was, of course, never revealed. The outward appearance of Nasse-setä is a parody of the Sirkus Papukaija character Faqir Kronblom.

In the 1990s, a children's song collection LP record called Nasse-sedän lastentunti (Children's hour with Uncle Nasse) was published. The record did not contain songs performed by Nasse-setä, only a few speaking parts between the songs.

Nasse-setä also appears in the Uuno Turhapuro films Uuno Epsanjassa (1985) and Uuno Turhapuro - This Is My Life (2004). For the 2004 Turhapuro film, Vesa-Matti Loiri put on Nasse-setä make-up for the first time in years.

Nasse-setä sketches can be found on the Spede Show DVD publications: Spede-Show - Kliffaa hei 1984-1985, Spede Show - Ihan huvin vuoksi 1985-1986 and Spede Show - Kyllä kansa tietää 1986-1987 as well as the Vesku Show DVD publications Vesku Show - Kuselan paluu and Vesku Show - Vili, Vili, Vili....
