= Liisa Nevalainen =

Finnish actress (1916–1987)

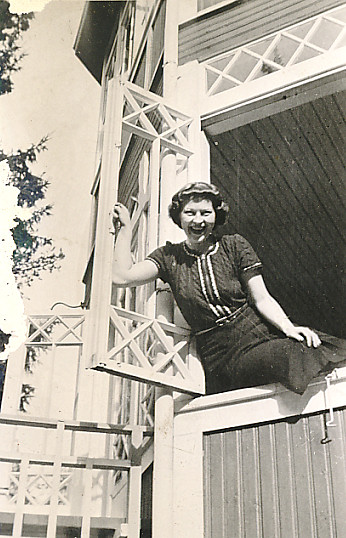
- Liisa Nevalainen in 1939
- Born: 2 May 1916; Oulu, Finland
- Died: 10 December 1987 (aged 71); Helsinki, Finland
- Occupation: Actress
- Years active: 1934–1973

Liisa Nevalainen (2 May 1916 – 10 December 1987) was a Finnish actress. She appeared in more than 30 films and television shows between 1934 and 1973.

== Selected filmography ==
- Substitute Wife (1936)
- Red Line (1959)
- Skandaali tyttökoulussa (1960)
- Pojat (1962)
