= Hukkaputki =

Finnish television show

Hukkaputki (Finglish: Stranded streak) is a 32-episode Finnish sketch-satire comedy television show from the 1980s. It aired on Yle TV1 from 1981 to 1983.

== Actors ==
- Tuija Ahvonen
- Kristiina Halkola
- Kari Franck
- Erkki Saarela
- Jukka Sipilä
- Kari Sorvali
- Leena Uotila
