= Perkele! Kuvia Suomesta =

1971 Finnish film

- Original Finnish film poster
- Directed by: Jörn Donner; Jaakko Talaskivi; Erkki Seiro
- Written by: Jörn Donner
- Starring: Jörn Donner; Jaakko Talaskivi
- Narrated by: Jörn Donner
- Cinematography: Heikki Katajisto
- Edited by: Jörn Donner; Jaakko Talaskivi; Erkki Seiro
- Music by: M. A. Numminen
- Production company: FJ-Filmi Oy
- Distributed by: Finnkino Oy (Finland)
- Release date: 19 March 1971 (Finland)
- Running time: 104 minutes
- Country: Finland
- Language: Finnish
- Budget: FIM 197,800

Perkele! Kuvia Suomesta (English: Fuck Off! Images from Finland) is a 1971 Finnish documentary film written and co-directed by Jörn Donner with Jaakko Talaskivi and Erkki Seiro.

The filmmakers traveled around Finland in 1970, interviewing random citizens and well-known public figures at time. The interviewees talk and express their opinions on, among other things, politics, contemporary phenomena, and their own everyday lives. The visual narrative is punctuated by socially conscious songs composed by M. A. Numminen and written by Jarkko Laine; the songs were compiled into the soundtrack album Perkele! Lauluja Suomesta.

The original version of the film was not approved by the censor board until February 1986. Yle TV1 has previously broadcast a cut version in 1973 and 1996 under the short title Kuvia Suomesta. Swedish television aired an uncut version of the film.

In 2017, Donner directed a sequel, Perkele 2, to celebrate the 100th anniversary of Finland's independence.

== See also ==
- List of Finnish films of the 1970s
- Perkele – a Finnish swear word
