= Jussi Pussi =

- Original Finnish film poster
- Directed by: Ere Kokkonen
- Written by: Esko Laukka
- Produced by: Spede Pasanen
- Starring: Vesa-Matti Loiri, Leena Brusiin, Simo Salminen, Leila Itkonen
- Cinematography: Kari Sohlberg
- Edited by: Taina Kanth, Irma Taina
- Music by: Esko Linnavalli, Christian Schwindt, Heikki Annala
- Production company: Filmituotanto Spede Pasanen Oy
- Release date: 24 April 1970
- Running time: 85 minutes
- Country: Finland
- Language: Finnish

Jussi Pussi is a 1970 Finnish film directed by Ere Kokkonen and produced by Spede Pasanen. Vesa-Matti Loiri stars in the title role.

The film explores the university environment of the 1960s and 1970s, particularly the political tensions following events such as the 1968 Paris student protests. Themes of sexuality are also central to the narrative.

The main character is a student admired by women, while Simo Salminen portrays an older student working on a sociology dissertation about sexuality. The supporting cast includes Irja Kuusla, Leila Itkonen, Sulevi Peltola, and Jaakko Talaskivi.

Jussi Pussi was the fifth most-watched film in Finnish cinemas in 1970, attracting 167,844 viewers. Among Finnish films, it ranked fourth, following another Ere Kokkonen film, Speedy Gonzales – noin 7 veljeksen poika.

== Cast ==
- Vesa-Matti Loiri as Jussi Lietessalo, psychology student
- Leena Brusiin as Irmeli Vierre, art history student
- Simo Salminen as Taneli Huurre, licentiate, "Tane"
- Leila Itkonen as Woman in the front seat
- Irja Kuusla as Hotel cleaner
- Pentti Irjala as Professor Vaapio
- Sulevi Peltola as Veistäjä, leftist student
- Jaakko Talaskivi as Yrjö Volanen, right-wing student
- Rauni Ranta as Professor Vaapio's wife
- Irene Ubbesen as Candle-buying woman
- Virpi Miettinen as Mixer buyer
- Tuula Hietanen as Housewife in the bath
- Anitra Lahtinen as Sympathetic woman
- Taito Loiri as Drawing teacher
