= Paavo Rintala =

Finnish novelist and theologian

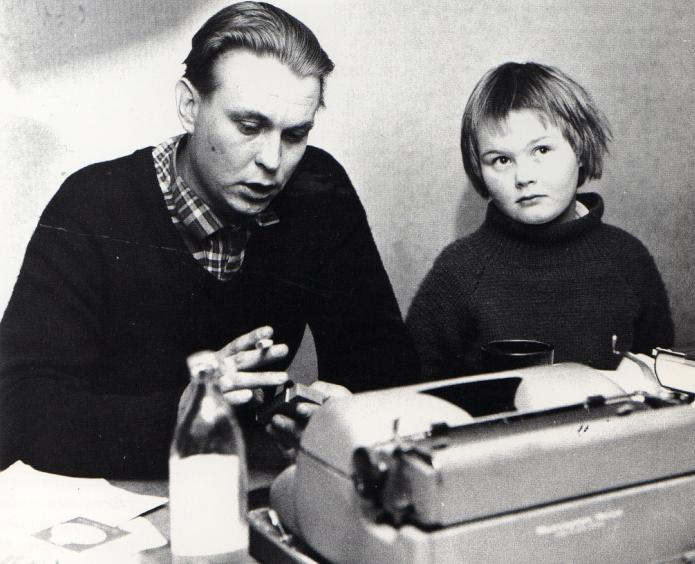
Paavo Rintala and his daughter Rauna Maria in September 1962.

Paavo Olavi Rintala (20 September 1930 – 8 August 1999) was a Finnish novelist and theologian. He also wrote theatre pieces, radio plays and prose.

Rintala was born in Viipuri, Finland. He has won the Finnish State Prize for Literature (Kirjallisuuden valtionpalkinto) many times, including in 1956, 1963, 1966, 1972, 1972 and 1991. He won the Finlandia Prize as a Finnish laureate for his 1991 novel Sarmatian Orfeus. He also won the Runeberg Prize (in Finnish Runeberg-palkinto) in 1994. In 1971, Rintala was awarded the Pro Finlandia medal. Two of his novels have been adapted to film by Finnish film director Mikko Niskanen. First was the 1958 novel Pojat adapted in 1962 with same title (English title The Boys). The other was the 1963 novel Sissiluutnantti adapted to film as Sissit.

Rintala died in Kirkkonummi, Finland, and he is buried in the Hietaniemi Cemetery in Helsinki.

== Bibliography ==
Novels

- 1954: Kuolleiden evankeliumi
- 1955: Rikas ja köyhä
- 1956: Lakko
- 1958: Pojat (adapted to film by Mikko Niskanen in same titled film)
- 1959: Pikkuvirkamiehen kuolema
- 1959: Jumala on kauneus
- 1960: Mummoni ja Mannerheim
- 1961: Mummoni ja marsalkka
- 1962: Mummon ja marskin tarinat
- 1963: Sissiluutnantti (adapted to film by Mikko Niskanen as Sissit)
- 1965: Keskusteluja lasten kanssa
- 1965: Sukeltaja
- 1966: Sotilaiden äänet
- 1967: Sodan ja rauhan äänet
- 1968: Leningradin kohtalosinfonia (also a radio play)
- 1969: Paasikiven aika
- 1970: Kekkosen aika
- 1970: Valitut teokset
- 1972: Viapori 1906
- 1972: Paavalin matkat
- 1974: Romeo ja Julia häränvuonna
- 1976: Nahkapeitturien linjalla I
- 1979: Nahkapeitturien linjalla II
- 1982: Puolan malja
- 1982: Valehtelijan muistelmat
- 1984: Eläinten rauhanliike
- 1985: Vänrikin muistot
- 1987: St. Petersburgin salakuljetus
- 1990: Minä, Grünewald
- 1991: Sarmatian Orfeus (nominated for Finlandia prize)
- 1993: Aika ja uni (nominated for Finlandia prize)
- 1994: Marian rakkaus (nominated for Finlandia prize)
- 1996: Faustus

Children books

- 1972: Uu ja poikanen

Short stories

- 1963: Eino (collection of 7 short stories)

Prose

- 1964: Palvelijat hevosten selässä
- 1969: Napapiirin äänet
- 1982: Velkani Karjalalle

Radio plays

- 1968: Leningradin kohtalosinfonia (based on same-titled novel)

Reports

- 1970: Vietnamin kurjet
- 1983: Maatyömies ja kuu
- 1984: Porvari Punaisella torilla
- 1986: Carossa ja Anna

Summaries

- 1974: Kesäkuu 44

Theatre

- 1981: Dostojevskin galleriat
- 1993: Aika ja uni (opera libretto)
