= Leena Uotila =

Finnish actress

- Born: 16 June 1947 (age 78); Helsinki, Finland
- Occupation: Actress
- Years active: 1971-present

Leena Uotila (born 16 June 1947) is a Finnish actress. She has appeared in more than one hundred films since 1971.

== Early life ==
On June 16, 1947, Uotila was born as Leena Marjatta Uotila in Helsinki, Finland.

== Filmography ==
=== Film ===
Year	Title	Role	Notes
1983	Uuno Turhapuron muisti palailee pätkittäin	Dentist	
1993	Ripa Hits the Skids		
2009	Hellsinki	Tomppa's mother	
2012	Road North		
2018	The Human Part		
2020	Ladies of Steel		
2023	Family Time	Ella	

=== Television ===
Year	Title	Role	Notes
1981–1983	Hukkaputki		
2000–2005	Sincerely Yours in Cold Blood	Mailis Santala	
2017	Hassel	Satu Mikkola	
