= Venla (given name) =

Venla is a Finnish feminine given name. Venla was the fourth most popular name for baby girls born in Finland in 2007.

== Notable bearers ==
- Venla, the main female character from the Aleksis Kivi penned Finnish novel Seven Brothers
- Venla Hovi (born 1987), Finnish ice hockey player
- Venla Lehtonen (born 1995), Finnish biathlete
- Venla Lindfors, née Orkamo, (born 2003), Finnish footballer
- Venla Luukkonen, born 1984), Finnish grappler and Brazilian jiu-jitsu competitor and instructor
- Venla Niemi (born 1990), Finnish orienteering competitor
