= Jukka Virtanen (director) =

Finnish writer and entertainer (1933–2019)

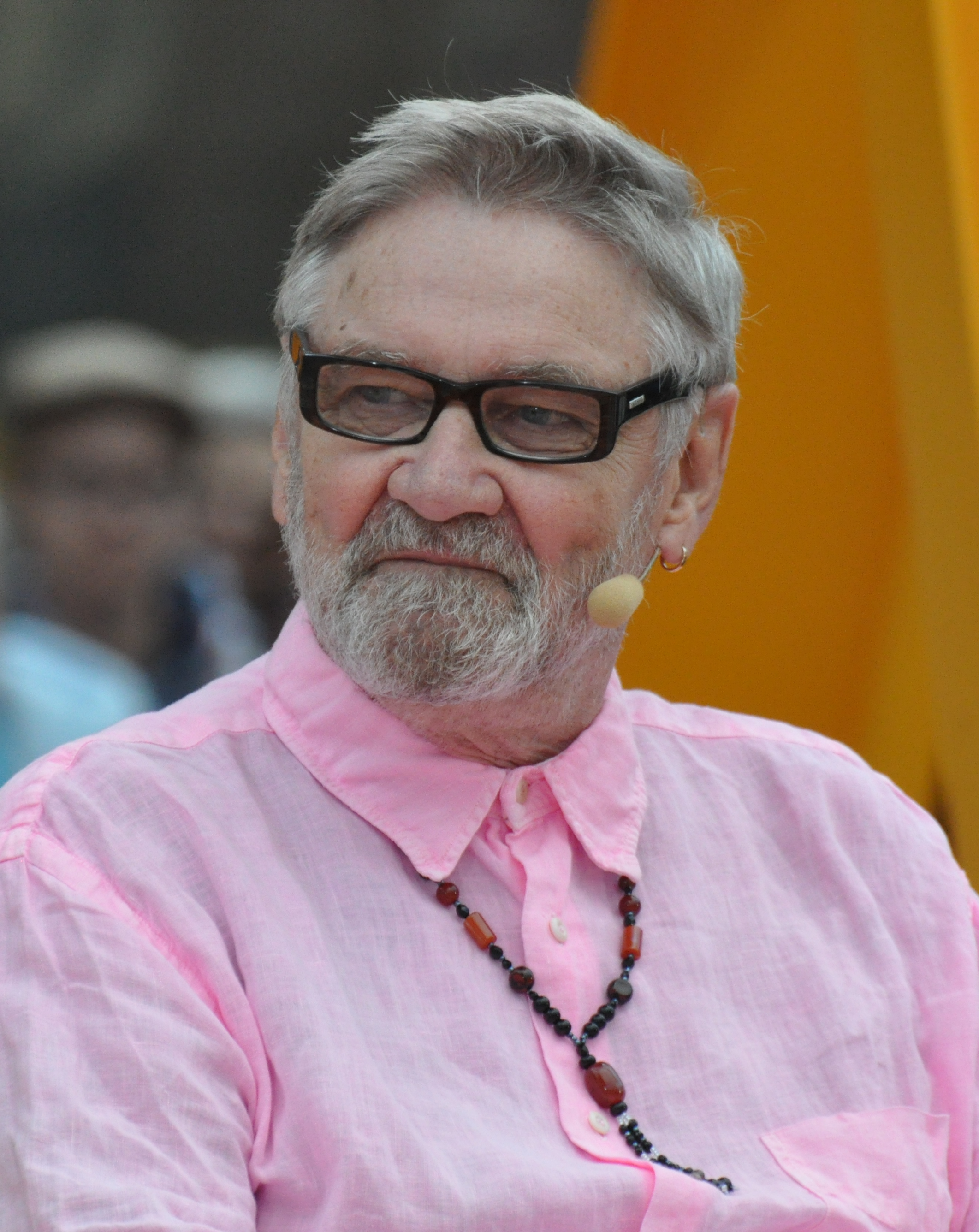
Jukka Virtanen

Jukka Jalmari Virtanen (25 July 1933 – 1 September 2019) was a Finnish entertainer and author. He worked as both a film and television director, actor and host. He was also an accomplished songwriter. Starting originally as a newspaper columnist, Virtanen began his television career in the 1950s and his film career in the 1960s.

He won the Rose d'Or in 1965 for the entertainment program Lumilinna (The Cold Old Days). He starred in and directed many films written by Spede Pasanen, including Millipilleri, Pähkähullu Suomi and Noin 7 Veljestä, as well as playing bit parts in the Uuno Turhapuro franchise.

He was also the long-standing host of the TV show Levyraati (1980–1997) as well as Runoraati. Additionally, he was a songwriter for a number of prolific Finnish musical artists such as Ilkka Lipsanen.

== Film career ==
Virtanen started his directorial career in the 1960s and directed a high number of TV movies for YLE. His first theatrical feature was Millipilleri in 1966 which he co-directed with Ere Kokkonen and Spede Pasanen, all of whom also played roles in the film. He also directed Pähkähullu Suomi (1967) as well as Noin 7 Veljestä (1968), where he also starred. His last theatrical film was Fakta Homma in 1987, based on the comedy TV show of the same name.

As an actor, he debuted in the movie Iloinen Linnanmäki and had a long-standing series of supporting roles in future Spede films, including Speedy Gonzales – noin 7 veljeksen poika and the Vääpeli Körmy series.

== TV career ==
Virtanen's TV career started formally in 1955 when he began directing both commercials and short-films for YLE. He directed and starred in a large variety of programs and TV produced films for YLE throughout the 1960s and 1970s.

Virtanen is also recognised as the long-term host of Levyraati on MTV3, based on the British show format Juke Box Jury. He took over the role of host from Vesa Nuotio (who hosted briefly following the long tenure of Jaakko Jahnukainen). In the program, a panel of guests rated new hit songs and their music videos weekly. Virtanen became noted for his appearance, manner of speech and cordial way in which he addressed the panel. Based on the format, he later hosted a similar program called Runoraati in which the panel rated poems.

Virtanen appeared in numerous small roles in TV shows. He was the narrator of the Finnish version of the Czech cartoon O loupežníku Rumcajsovi (Rosvo-Rudolf), as well as audio-books based on the character. He also localised the script, narrated and played the on-screen role of Iki-Iäkäs in the 1997 production The Joulukalenteri.

== Personal life ==
Virtanen was born in Jämsänkoski. Over the years he suffered from a variety of ailments, including alcoholism and prostate cancer. He was also diagnosed with bi-polar disorder. His cancer was aggravated in 2015, affecting his bone marrow.

His son is actor Ville Virtanen.

Virtanen died from prostate cancer on 1 September 2019, aged 86.

== Accolades ==
Virtanen received Actors' Pension (Taiteiljaeläke) in recognition for his cultural work since 1997.

- G. Pula-aho Award, 1995
- Musiikki & Media, 2001 – Lifetime achievement
- Special Venla and Kultainen Venla, 2002 & 2012 – Lifetime achievement
- Juha Vainio Award, 2008 – For composition
