= Jyväskylä City Theatre =

Theatre in Jyväskylä, Finland

- Jyväskylän kaupunginteatteri
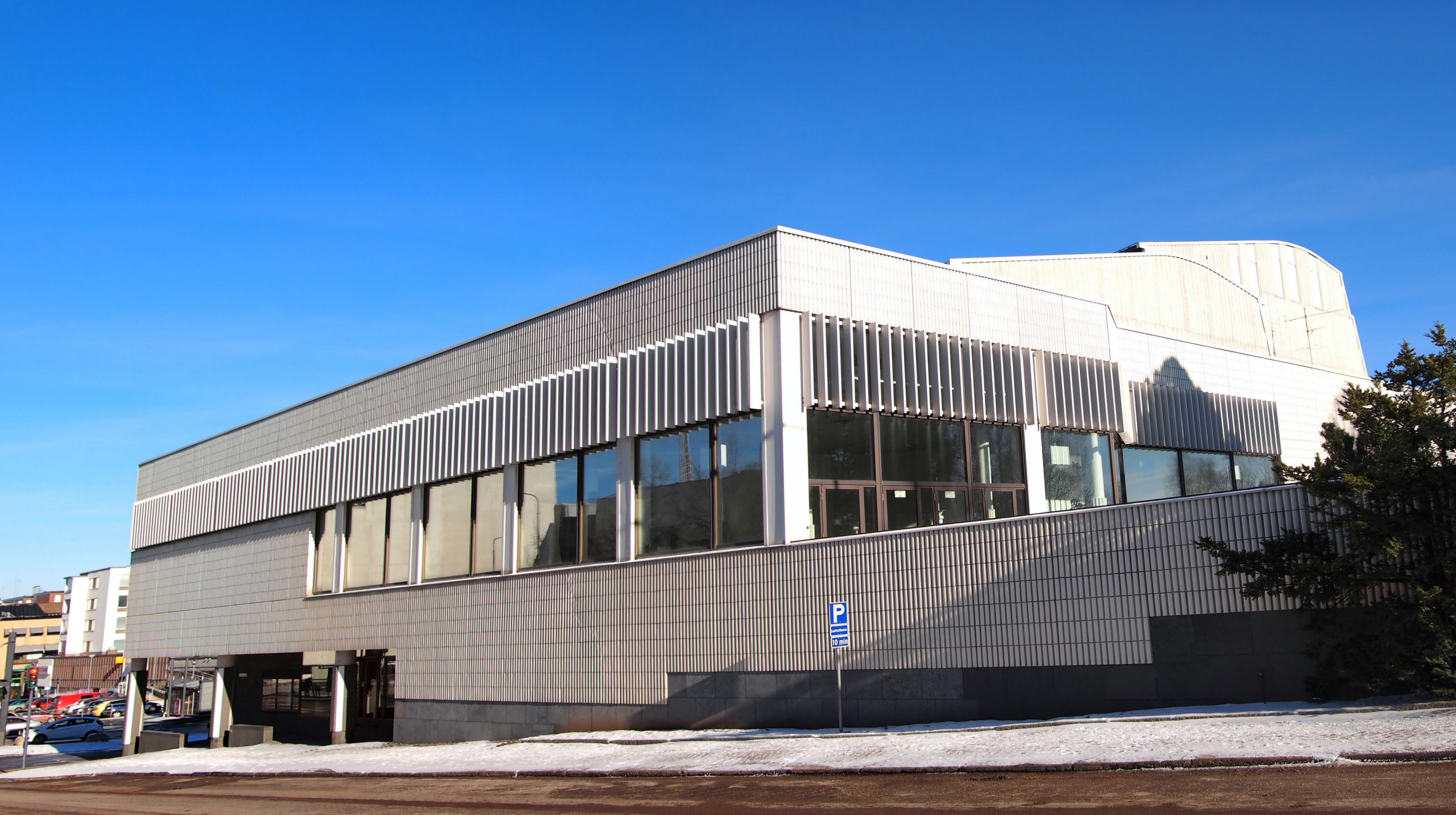
- Interactive map of Jyväskylä City Theatre
- Address: Jyväskylä; Finland
- Coordinates: 62.24°N 25.75°E
- Owner: City of Jyväskylä
- Capacity: c. 650 (total)
- Type: Public Theatre

Construction
- Opened: 1961; current building 1982
- Architect: Alvar Aalto

Website
- www.jyvaskyla.fi/en/jyvaskyla-city-theatre

The Jyväskylä City Theatre (Finnish: Jyväskylän kaupunginteatteri), founded in 1961, is the municipal theatre of the city of Jyväskylä, Finland.

== Overview ==
The theatre comprises two stages: the main auditorium seats 551 spectators, the smaller studio one c. 100.

Annually approximately 60,000 people visit the theatre, to see around 250 performances.

The Jyväskylä Sinfonia symphony orchestra uses the theatre as their main performance venue.

== Architecture ==
Having been founded two decades earlier, the theatre moved to its current premises in 1982. The present building is notable for having been designed by the Finnish architect Alvar Aalto.
