= The Boys (1962 Finnish film) =

1962 Finnish film

- Original Finnish film poster
- Finnish: Pojat
- Directed by: Mikko Niskanen
- Written by: Mikko Niskanen, Paavo Rintala
- Based on: Pojat by Paavo Rintala
- Produced by: T.J. Särkkä
- Starring: Pentti Tarkiainen, Vesa-Matti Loiri, Liisa Nevalainen, Kauko Helovirta
- Music by: Einar Englund
- Distributed by: Suomen Filmiteollisuus
- Release date: 30 November 1962
- Running time: 100 minutes
- Country: Finland
- Language: Finnish

The Boys (Finnish: Pojat) is a 1962 Finnish war drama film directed by Mikko Niskanen. It is based on a 1958 novel of the same name by Paavo Rintala. It was entered into the 3rd Moscow International Film Festival. The second lead role, Jake, was played by 17-year-old Vesa-Matti Loiri, who received the Jussi Awards certificate of honor for his role as a young actor.

The story conveys the life of school boys in the turbulent period of World War II in Oulu in northern Finland. Set during the Continuation War (1941–1944) and the Lapland War (1944–1945), the young men, in the absence of their fathers who have gone to war, are fascinated by war and the German Army soldiers and dream of heroic deeds.

== Cast ==
- Pentti Tarkiainen as Ilmari Kaarela, "Immu"
- Vesa-Matti Loiri as Jaakko Hoikka, "Jake" (as Matti Loiri)
- Uti Saurio as Paavo Harju, "Pate"
- Hannu Vironmäki as Matti Korpi
- Markku Söderström as Urkki
- Heikki Rissanen as Kaaleppi (from Tuira)
- Ilkka Liikanen as Martti (from Tuira)
- Martti Isosalo as Topi (from Tuira)
- Reima Eskelinen as A boy from Tuira
- Jorma Valtanen as A boy from Tuira
- Liisa Nevalainen as Jake's mother
- Kauko Helovirta as Capt. Fritz Mayer ("Uncle Fritz")
- Olavi Ahonen as Priest Pisa
