= Ville Virtanen (actor) =

Finnish actor (born 1961)

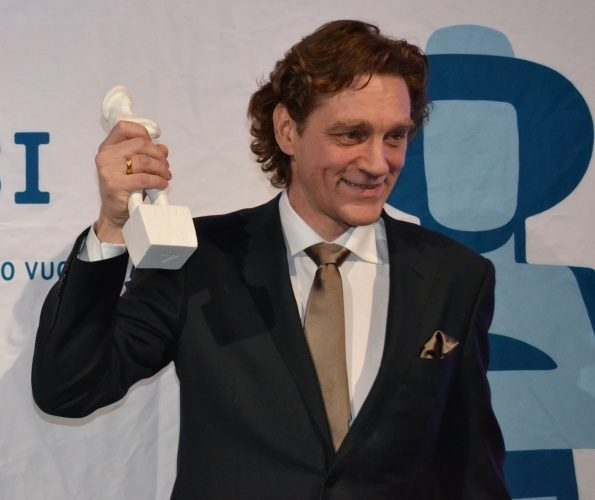
- Virtanen receiving the Jussi Award in 2011
- Born: 19 August 1961 (age 65); Espoo, Finland
- Occupation: Actor
- Known for: Kari Sorjonen (Bordertown)

Virtanen in 2026

Ville Virtanen (born 19 August 1961) is a Finnish actor.

He has starred in several films, including The Winter War (1989), Christmas Story (2007), and Bad Family (2010), for which he won the 2010 Jussi Award for Best Actor. He is also known for his main roles in Nelonen's crime drama Sincerely Yours in Cold Blood (2000–2005), SVT's crime drama Jordskott (2015), and YLE's and Netflix's crime drama Bordertown (2016–2020).

== Personal life ==
Virtanen's father was the director and actor Jukka Virtanen. From his marriage to Eija Vilpas, he has twin sons and a daughter, Sinna Virtanen. His wife is Swedish-language actress Birthe Wingren, and they live in Stockholm. Virtanen is a member of the Orthodox Church of Finland.

== Selected filmography ==
- Fakta homma (1987)
- The Winter War (1989)
- Hobitit (1993)
- Kotikatu (17 episodes, 1995–1998)
- Gold Fever in Lapland (1999)
- Monkey Business (2000)
- Upswing (2003)
- Young Gods (2003)
- Dog Nail Clipper (2004)
- Producing Adults (2004)
- Sincerely Yours in Cold Blood (30 episodes, 2000–2005)
- Promise (2005)
- Kummelin Jackpot (2006)
- The Year of the Wolf (2007)
- Black Ice (2007)
- Christmas Story (2007)
- The Border (2007)
- Sauna (2008)
- Bad Family (2010)
- Beyond (2010)
- Priest of Evil (2010)
- The Kiss of Evil (2011)
- Love and Other Troubles (2012)
- Nymphs (2014)
- Jordskott (2015)
- Occupied (2015)
- Bordertown (2016–2020)
- The Eternal Road (2017)
- The Truth Will Out (2018, 2021)
- Omerta 6/12 (2021)
- Bordertown: Mural Murders (2021)
- Thank You, I'm Sorry (2023)
- Never Alone (2025)
