= Kahdeksas veljes =

- Directed by: Spede Pasanen
- Written by: Spede Pasanen
- Produced by: Spede Pasanen
- Starring: Vesa-Matti Loiri; Spede Pasanen; Tarja Markus; Simo Salminen
- Cinematography: Kari Sohlberg
- Edited by: Taina Kanth; Irma Taina
- Music by: Jaakko Salo
- Production company: Filmituotanto Spede Pasanen Oy
- Release date: 26 February 1971
- Running time: 78 minutes
- Country: Finland
- Language: Finnish

Kahdeksas veljes (The Eighth Brother) is a 1971 Finnish film directed by Spede Pasanen. It was Pasanen's first completely independent work as a screenwriter and director. The film attracted 176,175 viewers to theaters.

Despite the title, the plot bears no connection to Aleksis Kivi's Seven Brothers, nor is it a sequel to the earlier Spede production, Noin 7 veljestä. The only reference to the title comes in the opening credits, where it is jokingly claimed that there was, in fact, an eighth brother, whom Kivi omitted because he had been bribed.

== Plot ==
Jalli Riivatsalo (Spede Pasanen) works as a switchboard operator at Universal Advertising Agency. However, his salary is so low that he must find extra income with the help of his friend Jaska (Vesa-Matti Loiri).

The two engage in schemes, including selling clear water as bootleg liquor and taking money from drunk restaurant patrons. Ultimately, Jalli decides to strike it rich by marrying Finland's wealthiest woman. Using the book Finland's 20 Richest Families, he identifies his bride-to-be, the daughter of CEO Tässäpuro.

== Cast ==
- Vesa-Matti Loiri as Jaska Hujanen
- Kauko Kokkonen as Bootleg liquor buyer
- Elina Katainen as Universal Advertising Agency employee
- Marja Korhonen as Riivatsalo's secretary
- Raiku Kemppi as Mrs. Tässäpuro
- Pehr-Olof Sirén as Universal Advertising Agency member
- Tarja Markus as Marjut Tässäpuro
- Juhani Kumpulainen as CEO Arvid Tässäpuro
- Simo Salminen as Universal Advertising Agency CEO Kalevi Riivatsalo
- Spede Pasanen as Jalmar "Jalli" Riivatsalo, Universal Advertising Agency "switchboard operator"
