= Pojat (novel) =

1958 novel by Paavo Rintala

- Cover of the book
- Author: Paavo Rintala
- Language: Finnish
- Publisher: Otava
- Publication date: 1958
- Publication place: Finland
- Pages: 319

Pojat (meaning Boys in Finnish) is a famous 1958 Finnish novel by Finnish author Paavo Rintala published by the Finnish publishing house Otava.

Also known as Kuvia v. 1941–44 Oulun (Pictures of Oulu 1941–1944), it conveys the life of school boys in the turbulent period of the World War II in Oulu in northern Finland. The young men, in the absence of their fathers who have gone to war, are fascinated by war and the German Army soldiers and dream of heroic deeds. One of them, Immu, starts to develop a critical stand toward death and war. The novel can be seen as continuing the tradition of depicting Oulu-based boys from started by Teuvo Pakkala (1862–1925).

Rintala returned to the life of Immu, the disillusioned idealist, in his follow-up novel Pikkuvirkamiehen kuolema in 1959.

== Film adaptation ==
The novel was adapted in 1962 to the screen as Pojat by the Finnish director Mikko Niskanen. The film is also known by its English title The Boys with certain deviations from the text of the original 1958 novel.
