= Speedy Gonzales – noin 7 veljeksen poika =

Speedy Gonzales - noin 7 veljeksen poika
- Original Finnish film poster
- Directed by: Ere Kokkonen
- Written by: Ere Kokkonen; Vesa-Matti Loiri; Spede Pasanen
- Produced by: Spede Pasanen
- Cinematography: Kari Sohlberg
- Edited by: Taina Kanth; Irma Taina
- Music by: Jaakko Salo
- Distributed by: Filmituotanto Spede Pasanen
- Release date: 1970
- Running time: 85 minutes
- Country: Finland
- Language: Finnish

Speedy Gonzales – noin 7 veljeksen poika (English: Speedy Gonzales - The son of about seven brothers) (1970) is a Finnish western comedy directed by Ere Kokkonen, and written by Kokkonen with Spede Pasanen and Vesa-Matti Loiri. The title refers to Pasanen's 1968 film Noin seitsemän veljestä, though the movie does not otherwise link to it in any way. Neither has it anything to do with the cartoon character Speedy Gonzales.

The basic premise of the movie is to poke fun at the conventions and clichés of Spaghetti Westerns, which is accomplished by the juxtaposition of serious elements with the parody that Pasanen was famous for. The resulting film is considered both a tribute and a mockery of westerns as a whole.

The film was a success, which led to the creation of a sequel, Hirttämättömät, released the following year.

== Synopsis ==
The outlaw Speedy Gonzales rides into town in New York to investigate the death of his brother, Mooses. Despite being met by resistance from the locals, he is determined to solve the crime. Meanwhile, two of the world's worst gunslingers are matching their skills and the desperate desperado Clyde is trying to rob a bank with abysmal success...

== Cast ==
- Spede Pasanen as Speedy Gonzales and Mooses Gonzales
- Tarja Markus as Rita
- Pertti Melasniemi as Clyde
- Esko Salminen as Manolito
- Ville-Veikko Salminen as Bat Masterson
- Simo Salminen as Hämeen hitain ("the slowest gun in Häme")
- Olavi Ahonen as the bartender

== Production ==
The film's Western town sets were re-purposed from the Finnish TV skit-show Kivikasvot (from the segment Päivä Lännessä, "A Day in the West"). It was the sixth Spede feature to be directed by Ere Kokkonen. Vesa-Matti Loiri intended to play the part of Clyde but broke his leg in an accident and was replaced by Melasniemi just prior to filming. He appeared in the film's sequel Hirttämättömät a year later, which he wrote and directed along with Pasanen.

Jukka Virtanen, who has a minor role in the film as the town drunkard, also wrote the lyrics for the two songs in the film: Haaskalinnut saalistaa, performed by Spede, and Hämeen Hitain, performed by Salminen and released as a stand-alone single but not heard in the actual movie.
