= Eija Vilpas =

Finnish actress (born 1957)

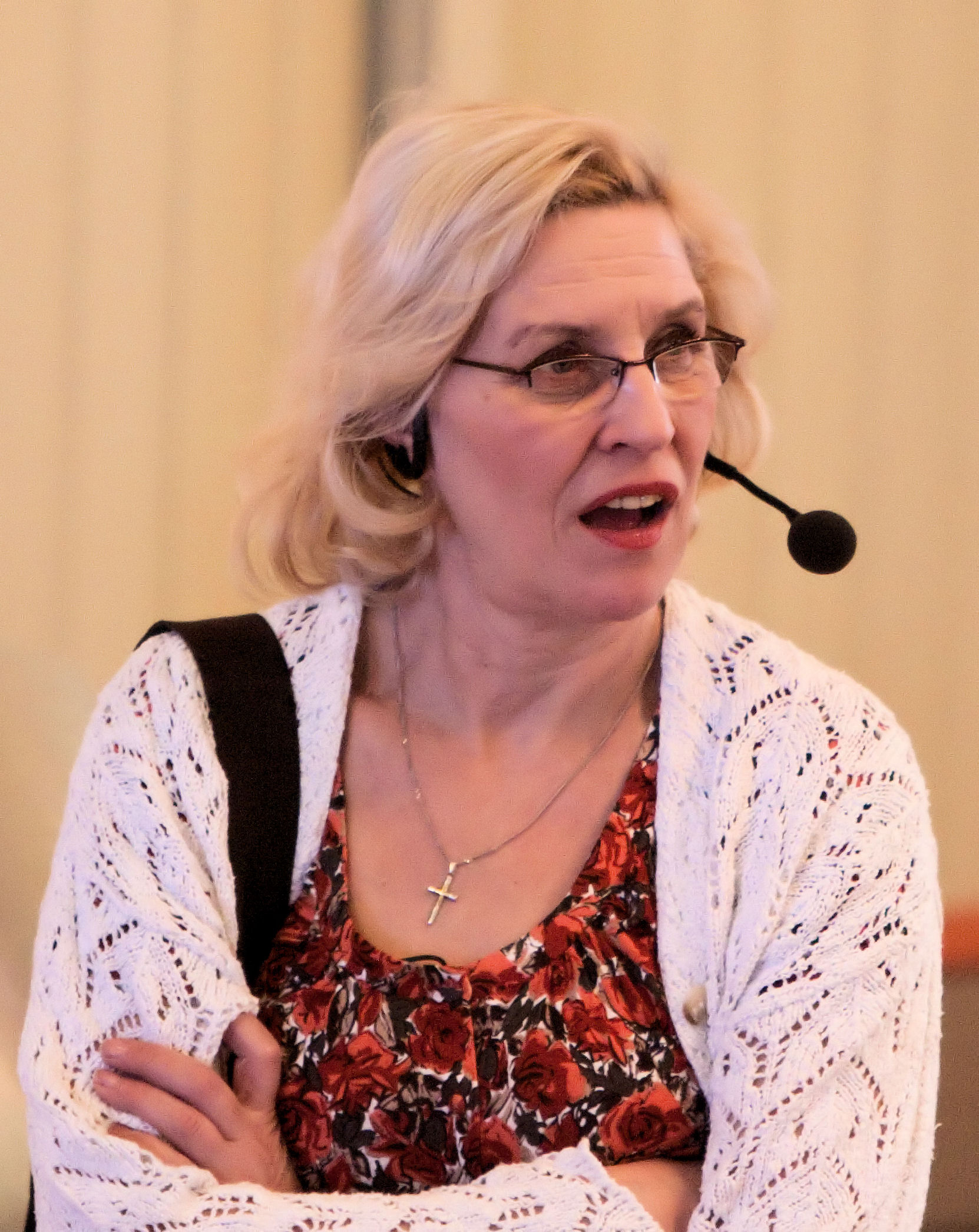
- Eija Vilpas
- Born: Eija Annikki Vilpas; 17 July 1957 (age 68); Tuusula, Finland

Eija Annikki Vilpas (born 17 July 1957 in Tuusula, Finland) is a Finnish actress. She is known of her roles in several Finnish comedy series, for example Fakta homma and Hynttyyt yhteen. The focal point of her career lies in stage acting: Vilpas has worked in the Helsinki City Theatre since 1988.

She has also done voice-over work for Finnish film dubs. She provided the voice of Marge Simpson in The Simpsons Movie and Maggie the cow in Disney's Home on the Range.

She has been married to the actor Ville Virtanen. She recorded an album Eija Vilpas in 1993. Eija Vilpas in the mother to the Finnish dramaturge and playwright Sinna Virtanen.
