= Golden Venla =

Finnish television award

- Native name: Finnish: Kultainen Venla
- Awarded for: Excellence in television
- Country: Finland
- Presented by: Finnish Television Academy
- First award: 2010; 16 years ago
- Website: www.kultainenvenla.fi

The Golden Venla (Finnish: Kultainen Venla) is a Finnish television competition and gala organized by the Finnish Television Academy (Televisioakatemia ry, which comprises MTV3, Yle, Sanoma and SATU ry). The Golden Venla Awards recognize the year's best Finnish television programs, their creators and performers. The Golden Venlas are voted on by members of the Academy who are professionals working in the industry. It replaced the Venla award (1982–2010) and the Kultainen TV award (2008–2010).
