= Venla award =

Television award in Finland

Venla was a Finnish television award. It was awarded annually between 1982 and 2010, after which it was replaced by the Golden Venla gala and award.

The drama and entertainment judges award prizes in eleven categories by show type and personal function. In addition, Yleisövenla ("Public Venla") is selected by the public and both kinds of judges may award a Special Venla. Thus, 12–14 Venlas are awarded every year, often 13.

The five biggest Finnish television channels take part in the event: Yle TV1, Yle TV2, MTV3, Nelonen, and Yle Fem.

The Venla Gala is arranged every January by one of the partaking channels.
