= Olli Ahvenlahti =

Finnish pianist, composer and conductor (born 1949)

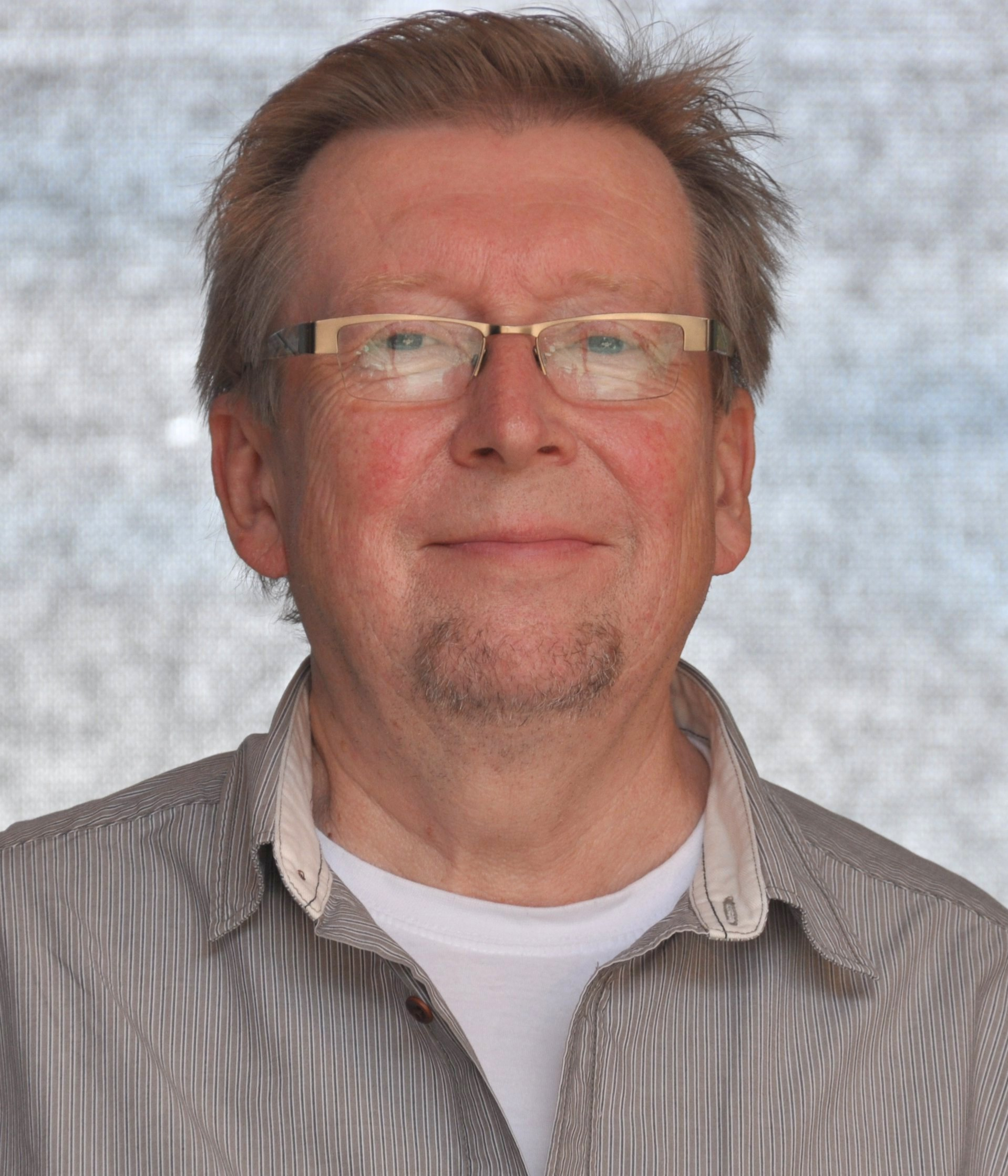
- Ahvenlahti in 2012

Background information
- Born: Olli Antero Ahvenlahti; 6 August 1949 (age 77); Helsinki, Finland
- Origin: Helsinki, Finland
- Genre: Jazz
- Occupations: Pianist; composer; arranger; conductor
- Years active: 1975–2025

Olli Antero Ahvenlahti (born 6 August 1949) is a Finnish pianist, composer and conductor of Russian and Norwegian descent.

Ahvenlahti succeeded Ossi Runne as the Finnish conductor at the Eurovision Song Contest for the 1990 Contest. In all, he conducted seven entries until the 1998 Contest (after which the orchestra was abolished)—the exceptions being the 1995 Contest and the 1997 Contest in which Finland did not participate. At these contests, Ahvenlahti was part of the Finnish commentary team.

He has played alongside a large number of Finnish artists, most notably the UMO Jazz Orchestra in the 1970s.

During the 1990s, he worked for the Finnish radio and television company YLE.
