= Kalevi Keihänen =

Finnish businessman (1924-1995)

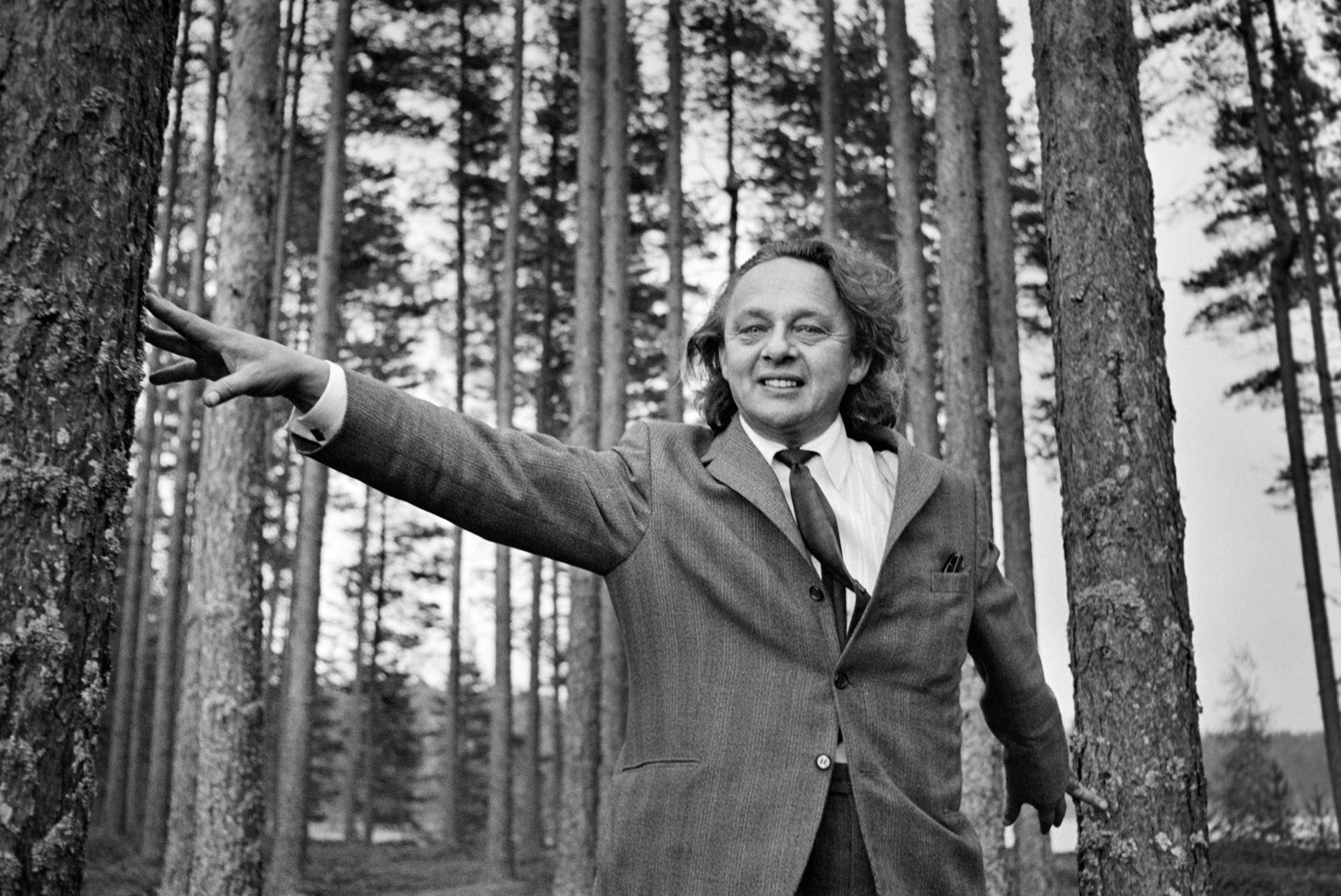
Kalevi Keihänen in Kihniö in 1969.

Åke Kalevi Keihänen (28 June 1924 – 9 February 1995) was a Finnish travel agency entrepreneur, director of Keihäsmatkat and a groundbreaking figure in Finnish tourism. Keihänen became known for his extravagant behaviour, long hair and unique style of dress – in advertisement photography, he wore a chinchilla fur coat with only a pair of swimming trunks underneath. The coat was said to have cost him 120,000 markka. Keihänen was said to have copied his style of dress from the Danish travel agency entrepreneur Simon Spies.

== Career ==
Kalevi Keihänen was born as the son of a shopkeeper in Vahto near Turku, and the family moved to Kihniö in northeastern Satakunta when Kalevi was only a little boy. Keihänen took part in the Lapland War. After the war he moved to Tampere, where he started a car rental business. Keihänen started his career in the travel business in 1954 by organising trips for sportspeople to the EM sports championships in Bern, Switzerland. He later organised ship trips to Visby, Sweden.

In 1965 Keihänen founded his own travel agency Keihäsmatkat, which began selling cheap trips to holiday resorts in southern Europe for Finns in the late 1960s. According to his own words, Keihänen flew 100,000 Finns to southern Europe every year. Financially, the best period for Keihäsmatkat were the years 1970 to 1972, but it gained the most public attention in its last years from 1973 to 1974. Kalevi Keihänen knew how to take good advantage of publicity to gain free advertising for his business. According to Keihänen, the common public travelled on his flights, and "the lords went their own way on chartered flights". The Keihäsmatkat head office on Kaisaniemenkatu in central Helsinki soon became a meeting spot of contemporary celebrities; friends of Keihänen included actor Tarmo Manni and publisher Urpo Lahtinen among others. As the activities expanded, Keihänen hired deputy judge Veikko Pajunen as an additional director of his travel agency. The agency's financial director was Keihänen's wife Tuovi Keihänen.

In the early 1970s Keihänen founded his own airline Spear Air which operated two DC-8-32 airplanes, named Härmän Jätkä and Härmän Mimmi. A third plane named Reissumies was on order but because of Keihäsmatkat's bankruptcy the order was cancelled.

Keihänen was also interested in winter travel – together with his friend publisher Urpo Lahtinen he built the first ski slopes and ski lifts to Tahkovuori in Nilsiä in the 1960s.

The 1973 oil crisis and large investments drove Keihänen into trouble. After the bank Helsingin Osakepankki stopped financing Keihänen's companies Keihäsmatkat filed for bankruptcy in May 1974, also causing the airline to stop operations, resulting in loss of jobs for over 200 employees. At the time of bankruptcy, Keihäsmatkat had about 1800 passengers abroad. Keihänen himself blamed the state-owned airline Finnair for the downfall of his companies. According to Finnair, the airline had offered extensive co-operation to Keihänen and had even been prepared to repaint some of its aircraft with Keihäsmatkat colours. Instead of leasing aircraft from Finnair, Keihänen wanted an airline of his own, and its investments ultimately brought on his downfall.

In 1978 Keihänen founded a new company called Seiväsmatkat, which only stayed in business for a short time. He owned the Pyhäniemi holiday resort in Kihniö: Keihänen had planned a "Seiväs Sex Village" as a tourism magnet in Kihniö in the 1970s, but the plan was never carried out. Almost all of the about twenty farms owned by Keihänen in Kihniö were auctioned off in June 1976.

In the 1980s Keihänen was sentenced to prison for tax evasion.

The latter part of Keihänen's life was shadowed by a grave illness, and he spent the end of his life in Pikku-Huopalahti in Helsinki. Keihänen died in 1995 at the age of 70, and he has been buried at the Turku Cemetery. In an article in Helsingin Sanomat in 2007, the authors of Suomen kansallisbiografia listed Keihänen as one of the biggest influencers in the time of independent Finland, and he has been described as the father of mass tourism in Finland.

== Korpilinna ==
From 1969 to 1970 Keihänen bought a residential house named Korpilinna in Pohjois-Tapiola, Espoo from Lieutenant Colonel Antti Hämäläinen's widow Anna-Liisa, which he converted into an apartment for his family from 1971 to 1972. The three-story house had 470 square metres of living space, six bedrooms, office spaces including a 30-person wet bar and a swimming pool. In the courtyard there were a children's play cabin, a smoke sauna, a fountain and an artificial pool where Keihänen raised rainbow trout. The artist Irwin Goodman lived in Keihänen's apartment for half a year after losing his apartment in Tampere in 1976. The house was auctioned off to Kauko Tyllilä, the owner of Espoo-based transport company Juhanilan Linja Oy. Tyllilä never lived in the house himself but instead rented it out for other people. In 1988, the disused house was sold off to a construction company which dismantled it and built a detached house with 12 apartments in its place in 1994.

== Keihänen in popular culture ==
The refrain of Irwin Goodman's song "Minä ja Urkki" mentions Keihänen. Juha Vainio made a song called "Varsinaiset Seiväsmatkat" about Keihäsmatkat. "Seuramatkat", another song by Juha Vainio, was about the liquor-infested flights of the Härmä boys to holiday resorts in southern Europe, full of sunshine and cheap booze. The cheerful refrain "Nää on suuret suomalaiset seiväsmatkat" ("These are the great Finnish spear flights") was a reference to Keihänen's company Keihäsmatkat. The song was recorded in 1967 by Reijo Tani (1931–2011), the drummer of the Kotka-based band of Pertti Metsärinne, written by Jukka Lindfors.

Kalevi Keihänen's character, played by Seppo Sallinen, appears in Timo Koivusalo's film Rentun ruusu which is about Irwin Goodman's life. There is also the character of travel agency entrepreneur Kille Kiekkonen, modelled after Kalevi Keihänen, in Matti Kassila's 1973 film Meiltähän tämä käy, played by Pekka Autiovuori.

The mustard company Colman's advertised their mustard in Finland in the middle 1970s with Kalevi Keihänen's name and picture.

A TV series about Keihäsmatkat named Keihäsmatkat was published in January 2020, with Keihänen played by Janne Kataja. The series was produced by the company Hihhihhii Oy, owned by Kataja and Aku Hirviniemi. According to Kataja, the series is a fictional story including factual events.

== Bibliography ==
- Kostiainen, Auvo: "Keihänen, Kalevi (1924–1995)", Suomen kansallisbiografia, osa 5, pp. 75 – 77. Helsinki: Finnish Literature Society, 2005. ISBN 951-746-446-0. Online version.
