= Keihäsmatkat =

Finnish travel agency

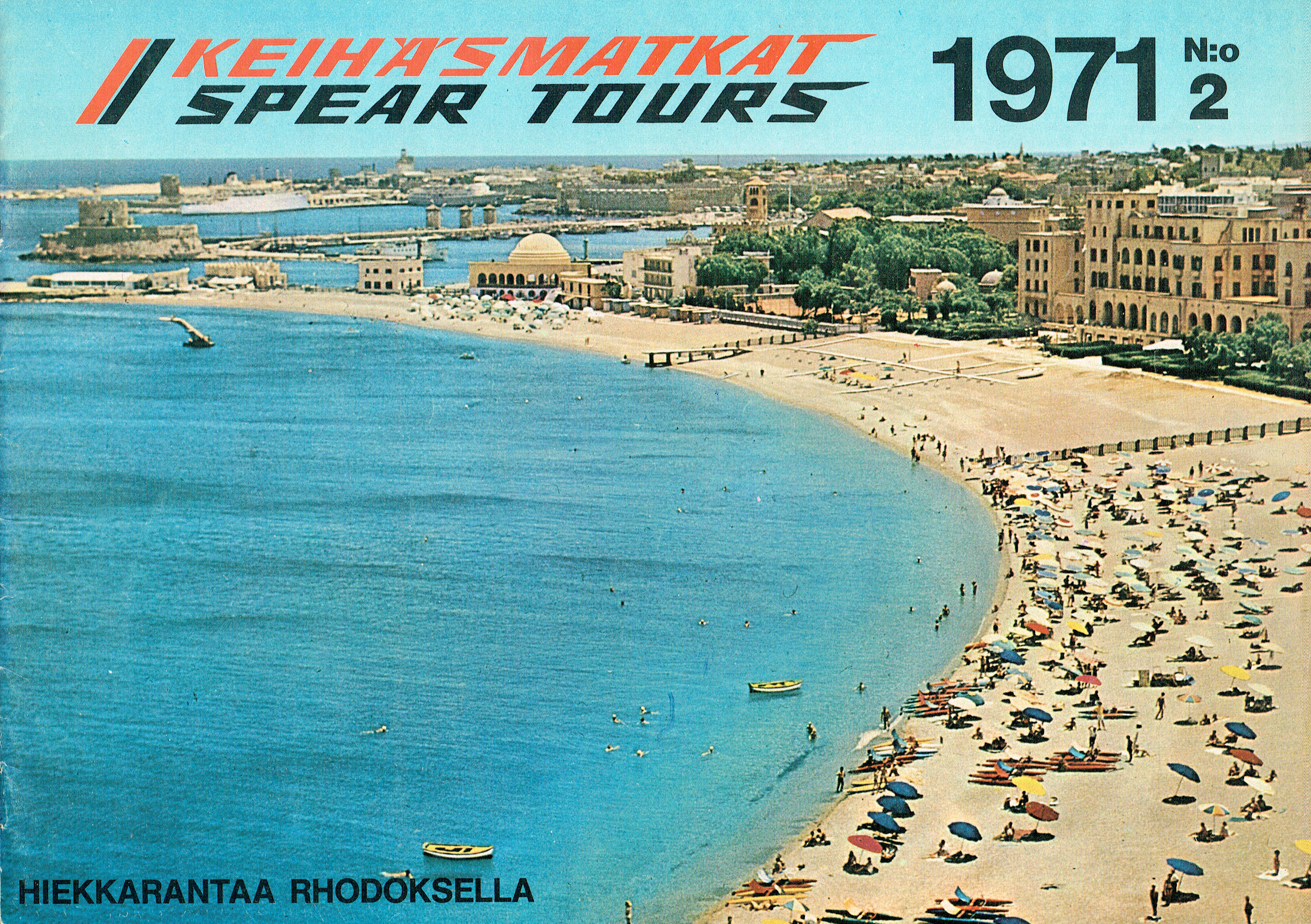
A Keihäsmatkat advertisement from Rhodes in 1971

Keihäsmatkat (Spear tours (Note: The name "Spear tours" comes from a pun - according to Finnish grammar, the name "Keihänen" is inflected as "Keihäs" in compound words, but the word "keihäs" also means "spear" in Finnish.)) was a Finnish travel agency active in the 1960s and 1970s, making flights from Finland to continental Spain and to the Canary Islands with almost 100,000 passengers per year from 1965 to 1974. The founder and CEO of the company was Kalevi Keihänen, known for his extravagant behaviour and unique style of dress. The company specialised in week-long holiday flights to Spain.

== History ==
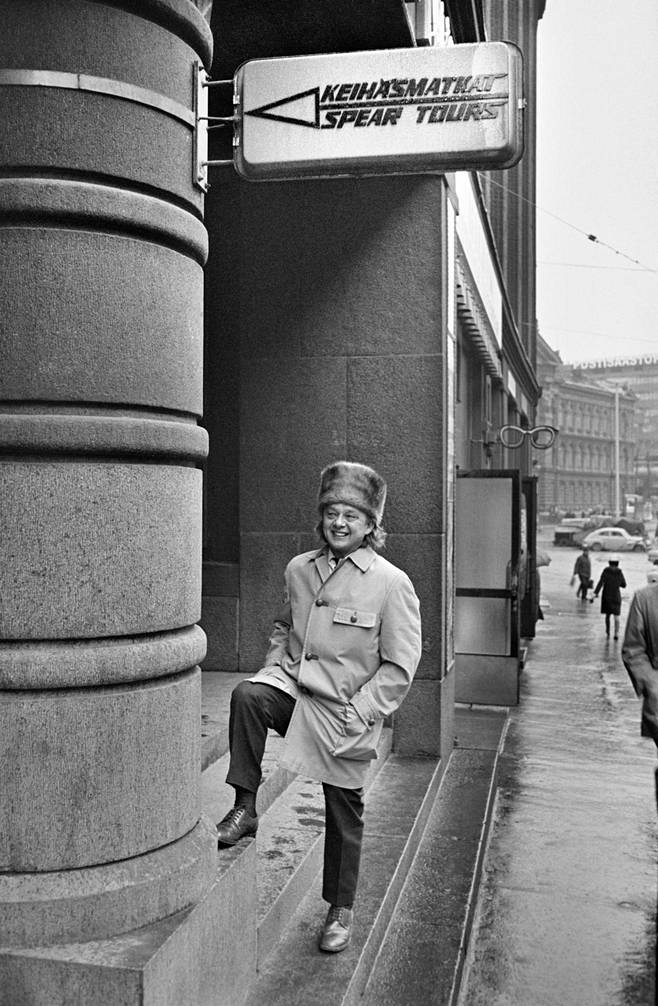
Kalevi Keihänen on the stairs of his company in Helsinki in 1969

The predecessor of Keihäsmatkat was Turistimatkat Oy founded by Kalevi Keihänen in 1954, which was the result of a bus and camping trip to the 1954 European Athletics Championships in Bern, Switzerland. After managing a car rental company for a few years, Keihänen founded Keihäsmatkat Oy in 1965. Financially, the best age for the company was from 1970 to 1972, but it drew the most public attention in its last two years from 1973 to 1974. In an autumn 1973 interview by reporter Mirja Pyykkö, Keihänen mentioned the annual revenue of his companies as 75 million markka.

Marketing practices of the company included extravagant articles in the magazine Hymy founded by Keihänen's friend, magazine publisher Urpo Lahtinen and advancing and advertising excessive use of alcoholic beverages. This was reflected in Keihänen's slogan "You sit on the plane, have a couple of drinks and you're there".

The company had its own airline Spear Air Oy from 1972 to 1974. Spear Air operated two DC-8-32 passenger jet aircraft, named Härmän Jätkä and Härmän Mimmi. According to Keihänen, these were the only passenger aircraft in the world to serve moonshine to passengers. While Keihänen advertised the liquor as traditional Finnish vodka from Kihniö, in reality it was cheap Spanish vodka from Mallorca, which was only revealed later.

The most important topics in Kalevi Keihänen's advertising included cheap liquor, sex and "Finnishness" as well as resorts where tourists could party from sunrise to sunset. Drunkenness and passing out was completely acceptable. Keihänen made a point that no one had to be alone on trips organised by Keihäsmatkat. On the other hand, a characteristic part of the trips was that the typical Keihäsmatkat customer was not interested in the culture or people of the target country. On the contrary, a constant state of alcoholic intoxication was seen as a defense mechanism against culture shock; this was similar to the "vodka tourism" on contemporary trips to the Soviet Union.

== End and bankruptcy ==
The company went bankrupt in 1974, mostly because of increased fuel prices caused by the 1973 oil crisis. Spear Air Oy soon followed Keihäsmatkat Oy in bankruptcy. When Keihäsmatkat ceased operations it had about 1800 passengers abroad, and bankruptcy caused over 200 company employees to lose their jobs.

Kalevi Keihänen blamed the bankruptcy of his companies on the state-owned airline Finnair, as he thought Finnair wanted to get rid of a competitor it did not tolerate. Gunnar Korhonen, Finnair's CEO at the time, denied Keihänen's accusations but also admitted that Finnair and Spear Air Oy competed for the same customers.

Veikko Pajunen, Spear Air's final CEO, blamed the bankruptcy also on too large investments made too early. The largest debtors of the company included the seller of the aircraft, the bank Helsingin Osakepankki, various insurance and oil companies, and the Finnish state.

Keihäsmatkat's share of the travel market was mostly shared between its four largest competitors Aurinkomatkat, Tjäreborg, Vingmatkat and Spies. According to Keihäsmatkat sales director Pentti Sivula, the company's biggest achievement was teaching the Finnish public to travel in their free time.

In 1976, Kalevi Keihänen tried to re-enter the travel market by founding a new travel agency Seiväsmatkat Oy with a founding capital of two million markka. Keihänen intended to gather more funds for the company by selling shares to the public, but the attempt failed and many investors lost their money.

After his companies went bankrupt, Kalevi Keihänen was charged with tax evasion, bankruptcy crimes and breaking currency exchange rules. After a trial lasting over three years, the Helsinki district court sentenced Keihänen to one year and eight months in prison with parole in May 1981.

== Cultural heritage ==
Keihäsmatkat was featured in Toivo Kärki's and Juha Vainio's schlagers Seuramatkat (1967, performed by Reijo Tani), Varsinaiset seiväsmatkat (1969) and Kihniön kipakka (1973). Kalevi Keihänen made the schlagers into a way of advertising in 1974, shortly before his companies went bankrupt. Together with Vainio, he produced an advertisement cassette tape Kipakasti soi Keihäsellä published by Finnlevy, which was sold on Spear Air's aircraft. The tape had 12 schlagers about travels to southern tourist resorts – performed by Juha Vainio, Irwin Goodman, Paula Koivuniemi and others – intertwined by five short advertising slogans including the famous "one markka to Mallorca, two to the Canary Islands". A remix tape Menopäällä 1 without the advertisements was also published.

The TV series Keihäsmatkat premiered in 2020.
