= Keihäsmatkat (TV series) =

- Genre: Drama
- Written by: Outi Keskevaari; Lari Seppälä
- Directed by: Jäppi Savolainen
- Starring: Janne Kataja; Jenni Banerjee; Aku Hirviniemi; Hannele Lauri; Bianca Bradey; Taisto Oksanen; Niina Lahtinen
- Country of origin: Finland
- Original language: Finnish
- No. of seasons: 1
- No. of episodes: 10

Production
- Producer: Pia Winter
- Camera setup: Heikki Färm
- Running time: 42 minutes
- Production company: Hihhihhii

Original release
- Network: Nelonen
- Release: 2020

Keihäsmatkat is a Finnish drama TV series published on the Ruutu streaming service of the Nelonen channel in spring 2020. The series is about the Keihäsmatkat travel agency in the 1960s and the 1970s as well as its founder Kalevi Keihänen. Keihänen is played by Janne Kataja. The events in the series start from 1972 when Keihänen had acquired two aircraft and started his own airline Spear Air.

Shooting of Keihäsmatkat began in July–August 2019 and the series was shot during autumn 2019 in Finland and Turkey.

Publication of the series on television offended Keihänen's family, who felt it was an insult to his memory. The family has asked that the series should not be shown on television and according to newspaper articles, the family is considering taking legal action against the producers.

== Cast ==
- Janne Kataja: Kalevi Keihänen
- Jenni Banerjee: Armi, a purser
- Aku Hirviniemi: Tapio, a steward
- Hannele Lauri: Sirkka, a local guide
- Bianca Bradey: Juanita
- Taisto Oksanen: Gunnar Korhonen, CEO of Finnair
- Niina Lahtinen: Marja-Liisa, secretary of Korhonen
- Janika Terho: Maija, a stewardess
- Ville Tiihonen: Urpo Lahtinen
- Ilari Johansson: Irwin Goodman
- Ilkka Vainio: Junnu Vainio
- Lauri Ketonen: Tarmo Manni
- Markus Karekallas: Reidar Särestöniemi
- Ilkka Heiskanen: Kalervo Palsa
- Martti Suosalo: Raipe
- Anna-Leena Sipilä: Marke
- Jarkko Pajunen: Heikki
- Krisse Salminen: Johanna
- Kiti Kokkonen: Kuutamo
- Sanna Stellan: Tuula
- Inka Kallén: Leena
- Joonas Kuokkanen: Anssi
- Konstantin Nikkari: Sakari
- Sebastian Rejman: Morris
- Venla Savikuja: Erja
- Josefina Salo: Suvi Paaso
- Ylermi Rajamaa: Mikko
- Ismo Apeli: Ringo
- Markku Haussila: Gabriel
- Jarkko Tiainen: Erkki
- Sami Saikkonen: a priest
- Ella Pyhättö: Lissu
- Ari-Matti Hedman: Perttu
- Jarmo Mäkinen
- Tino Virta: a waiter
- Janita Juvonen: Anne
- Antti Peltola: Jyri
