= Pekka Paavola =

Finnish politician (1933–2023)

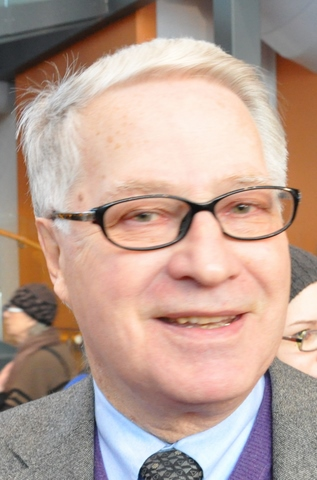
Paavola in 2010

Pekka Paavola (3 August 1933 – 18 March 2023) was a Finnish politician, a minister of justice, and a convicted criminal in multiple cases.

Paavola was born in Tampere. He was a city manager in Tampere 1969–1985. He was the minister of justice in the 1972 Rafael Paasio's cabinet. He was convicted of corruption in the so-called Noppa Case in the 1980s, in which he was found guilty of misusing his official office for personal gain. Paavola was a manager in the newspaper company Lehtimiehet Oy and later in the magazine company Yhtyneet Kuvalehdet. He retired in 1996. He returned to politics in 1992 when he was elected to Tampere city council on the Pro Tampere ticket. He later formed the Tampere Independents group.

In 2002 he was convicted of aggravated tax fraud. He received a 10-month suspended prison sentence.

The city council dismissed Paavola in 2002, but he was elected again in 2004. In December 2006 he was elected as a chairman of the council with support from the Conservative, Christian Democrat, The Centre, and the Green political parties. He had a good reputation among many ordinary people in Tampere. He was on Tampere city council until 2008.

On 31 December 2009, Paavola was handed a four-month suspended sentence for perjury in a case related to Maija-Liisa Lahtinen.

Paavola died at Hatanpää hospital in Tampere on 18 March 2023, at the age of 89.
