= Vanhojapoikia viiksekkäitä =

Single by Juha Vainio
- A-side: "'Vanhojapoikia viiksekkäitä'"
- B-side: "'Eräänlainen sotaveteraani'"
- Released: 1982
- Recorded: Takomo-Studio, Helsinki
- Genre: Schlager
- Songwriter: Juha Vainio.
- Producer: Jaakko Salo

Vanhojapoikia viiksekkäitä ("Moustached Bachelors") is a Finnish song composed and performed in by Juha Vainio. Released as a single in 1982 and the opening track to his 1983 album Sellaista elämä on, and remains one of his most popular songs to this day.

The song's lyrics tell the sad life stories of Nestori Miikkulainen, an old bachelor living on a rocky island in Lake Saimaa, and a lonely seal who lives in the waters near Nestori's cabin and comes to visit him when the old man plays his harmonica. The song's central themes are the depopulation of rural Finland, and nature preservation: the two protagonists are both said to be members of an endangered species.

The bachelor named Nestori Miikkulainen is named after a bachelor Vainio met while working for Yleisradio. He changed the last name to Miikkulainen, after his neighbor.
