= Tuubi =

Finnish game show

Tuubi is a Finnish television game show series. The series is shown on MTV3 and started on 7 March 2014. Its third and last season aired in 2017.

== Format ==
Tuubi is a game show based on YouTube videos. It is hosted by Vappu Pimiä and features two teams, which are captained by Sami Hedberg and Janne Kataja. On the show, the teams get to view various YouTube videos and have to answer questions based on them.
