= Monsieur Mosse =

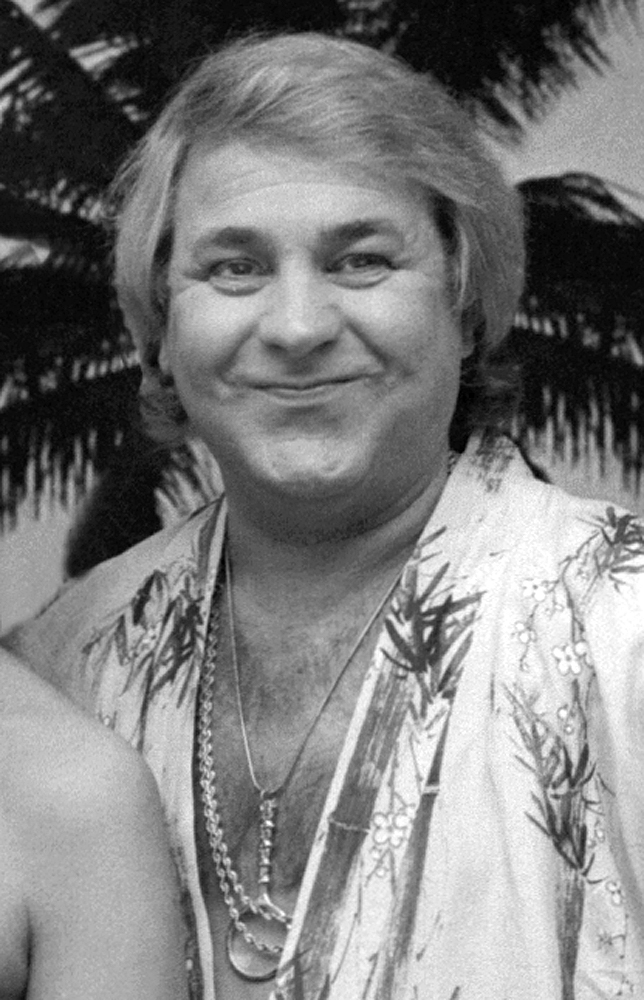
Make-up artist Monsieur Mosse, Raimo Jääskeläinen.

Monsieur Mosse, originally Raimo Jääskeläinen, was a Finnish make-up artist (1932–1992). Monsieur Mosse was the first openly gay Finnish celebrity, who "came out of the closet" in 1971. His nickname refers to his role as a UN ranger called Mosse in the Åke Lindman-directed film Laukaus Kyproksella. In the 1970s Monsieur Mosse ran beauty parlours in Helsinki and Tampere. Monsieur Mosse was permanent fixture of the magazine Hymy. He published his autobiography Voi pojat, kun tietäisitte! ( translates "Oh boys, if you only knew!") in 1981.
