= Työmiehen lauantai =

Single by Irwin Goodman

from the album Irwinismi
- B-side: "Kuin Ferrari"
- Released: November 30, 1965
- Studio: Finnlevy
- Genre: Folk song
- Length: 2:02

Irwin Goodman singles chronology
"En kerro kuinka jouduin naimisiin" (1965)	"Työmiehen lauantai" (1965)	"Kalteritango" (1966)

Music video
- "Työmiehen lauantai" on YouTube

"Työmiehen lauantai" (lit. 'Workman's Saturday') is a folk song released in 1965 by Finnish singer Irwin Goodman. It is part of the album Irwinismi, and the lyrics of song were written by Vexi Salmi.

At the time the song was written, the work week in Finland consisted of six days; Saturday was a shortened workday, allowing employees to head home relatively early—in the afternoon—but back then, Sunday was the only full day off. Finland did not transition to a five-day work week until 1969.

At one time, the song was banned from radio airplay because it was perceived as insulting to working men; during that period, it was broadcast in a censored version: the initial letter "T" was cut from the title, shortening it to "Yömiehen lauantai" ("The Night Man's Saturday"). However, "Työmiehen lauantai" reached third place on the list of Finland's best-selling singles in March 1966, and Irwinismi was the best-selling album in Finland in April 1966.

== See also ==
- Music of Finland
