= Veikko Ennala =

Finnish journalist

Veikko Ennala (9 October 1922 – 29 August 1991) was a Finnish journalist. His best-known work was for the magazine Hymy, published by Urpo Lahtinen.

The journalist character in the Risto Jarva film Kun taivas putoaa is transparently based on Veikko Ennala. According to his colleagues, Veikko Ennala was an enigmatic person and a man of contradictions. He could be a sophisticated gentleman, but he could also get angry in the blink of an eye. For example, Ennala treated the preacher Niilo Yli-Vainio, who became famous in the late 1970s, with subtle gentleness in his pastiches, but when Yli-Vainio, who was visiting the offices of Lehtimiehet Oy, approached Ennala with his hand outstretched and a flattering smile, Ennala became nervous. Ennala was a sophisticated dresser; he always wore a black or white suit and a silk scarf around his neck.
