= Haistakaa paska koko valtiovalta =

Single by Irwin Goodman

from the album Häirikkö
- B-side: "Pumtsi-kaada-pum-pum"
- Released: 1976
- Studio: Finnlevy
- Genre: Folk rock, protest song
- Length: 2:35

Irwin Goodman singles chronology
"Viuhahdus" (1974)	"Haistakaa paska koko valtiovalta" (1976)	"Häirikkö" (1976)

Music video
- "Haistakaa paska koko valtiovalta" on YouTube

"Haistakaa paska koko valtiovalta" (lit. 'Fuck the Whole State Apparatus') is a folk rock protest song released in 1976 by Finnish singer Irwin Goodman. It is part of the album Häirikkö. The song was composed by Paul Fagerlund and Irwin Goodman, and the lyrics were written by Vexi Salmi.

In the song, Irwin protests against the Finnish government—and the Finnish tax authorities in particular—a theme linked to an event that took place the year before the song was written, when the tax authorities seized property from the home Irwin shared with his wife in Tampere. Toivo Kärki, the production manager at Finnlevy, commented on the song by saying, "I absolutely support this." Lyricist Vexi Salmi later described the song as follows:

After a period of heavy drinking—during which Irwin spent a year and a half sitting in a cellar with a beanie pulled over his eyes—I wondered once again what kind of song could bring the guy back into the fold in one fell swoop. "Haistakaa paska koko valtiovalta" was the song that managed to do just that.

As expected, the track was banned from radio airplay, but this only served to increase interest in the song and boost its success; "Haistakaa paska koko valtiovalta" peaked at number two on the Finnish singles chart in November 1976. During the autumn of 1976 and the winter of 1977, it was also the most-played track in the jukeboxes operated by the Finland's Slot Machine Association (RAY).

== See also ==
- Music of Finland

== Sources ==
=== Further reading ===
- von Bagh, Peter; Hakasalo, Ilpo (1986). Iskelmän kultainen kirja (in Finnish). Helsinki: Otava. ISBN 951-1-08913-7.
