= Johanna Tukiainen =

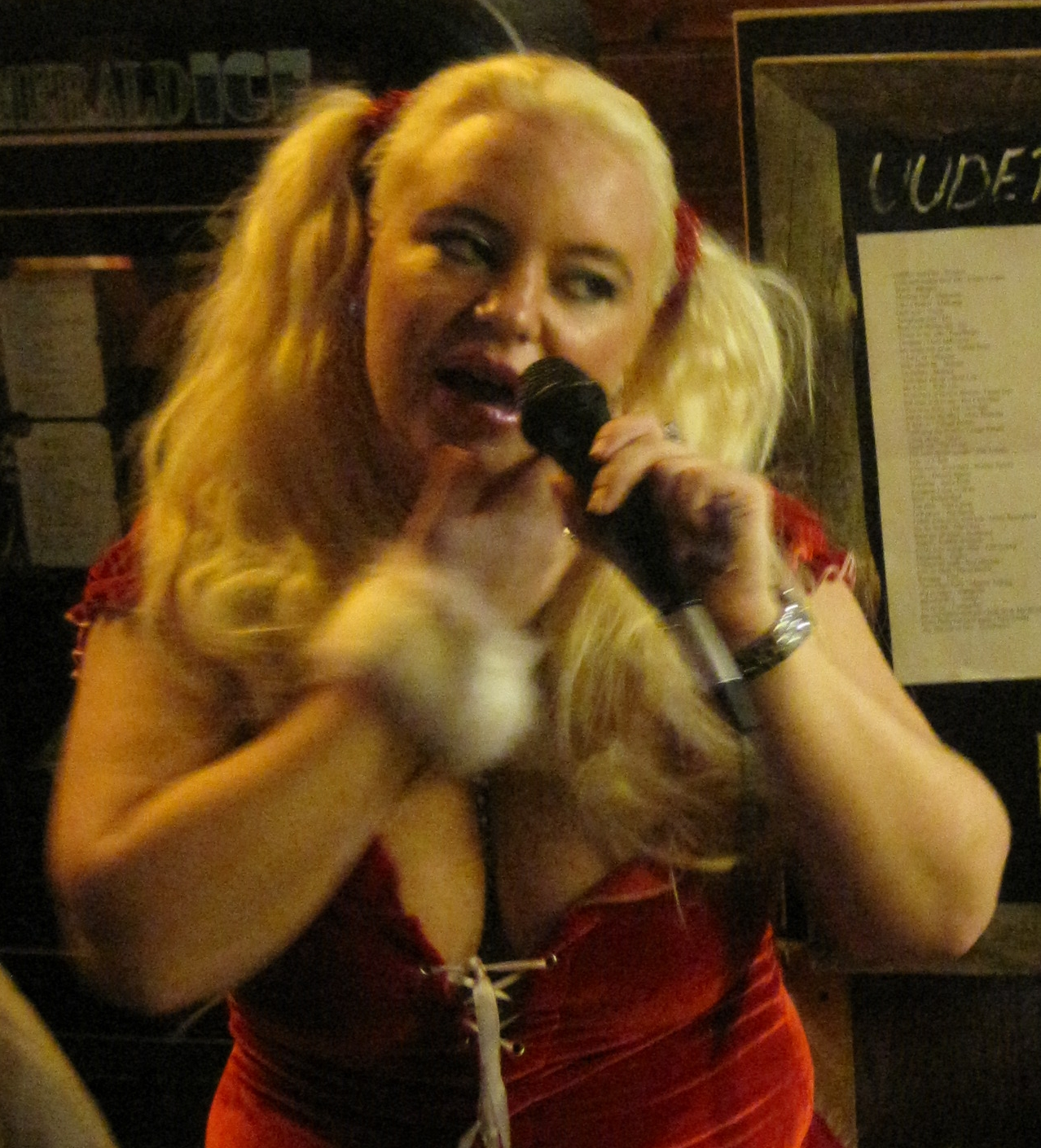
- Tukiainen in 2010

Background information
- Also known as: Tuksu
- Born: 29 July 1978 (age 48)
- Origin: Helsinki, Finland
- Genres: R&B, pop
- Occupations: Singer, erotic dancer, entrepreneur, television personality
- Instrument: Vocals

Johanna Tukiainen (born July 29, 1978) is a Finnish former television personality and singer.

== Background ==
Tukiainen first became known in March 2008 with a news report that Finland's foreign minister, Ilkka Kanerva, had been sending her sexually suggestive text messages. Tukiainen then sold the messages to the tabloid magazine Hymy. Kanerva insisted he would remain foreign minister but had to resign due to pressure from his party, the National Coalition Party.

== Early life ==
Tukiainen grew up in Laajasalo, Helsinki. She studied music at Laajasalo Upper Comprehensive School, and graduated in 1997. She has also studied in other schools, but never graduated in academics.

== Career ==
Tukiainen founded an all-female dance group in the early 2000s that is now defunct. She has also performed her own music and entertained at bars and clubs.

In 2012, Tukiainen was mentioned in news reports when she reportedly urinated publicly on the platform of the Tampere main railway station. Ever since these incidents, Tukiainen has been featured heavily in the headlines of the Finnish tabloid press.

Tukiainen was convicted of several criminal offenses, including multiple assaults and drunk driving, in 2011. In May 2013, she was sentenced to two months in prison for assault.

Tukiainen has also accumulated debt. According to official records, she owes various creditors an amount close to 60,000 euros.

== Personal life ==
In 2018, Tukiainen lived in Loviisa, Finland, but moved back to Helsinki later in the year. Although she has been known for working as an entertainer at bars and other such establishments across Finland, she has since reclaimed her Christian faith and has spoken at religious meetings.

In 2020, Tukiainen moved to Sweden to be with her family during the COVID-19 pandemic. Later that year, Tukiainen gave birth to a daughter with her partner at the time.

In August 2022, Tukiainen lost custody of her daughter due to Swedish social services having worried about her ability to care for her daughter. Upon the loss of custody, Tukiainen fled abroad with the child, thus violating the already set court ruling. She was later found by the local authorities in Bordeaux, France where she was apprehended, and the child was taken into custody. Tukiainen was charged with child abduction and other charges.

=== Family ===
Johanna's sister, Julia Tukiainen (born 1983), was found deceased in their apartment on 17 December 2013. Julia had been diagnosed with diabetes type 1 in her recent years. Her sister Jasmine Tukiainen died in 2021.
