= Tamperelainen =

Finnish free newspaper published in Tampere

- Type: Free newspaper
- Founder: Urpo Lahtinen
- Publisher: Etelä-Suomen Media Oy
- Editor-in-chief: Petteri Mäkinen
- Founded: September 19, 1957; 68 years ago
- Language: Finnish
- Headquarters: Tampere
- Website: www.tamperelainen.fi

Tamperelainen (Finnish pronunciation: [ˈtɑmperelɑi̯nen], literally translated "Tamperean", meaning person who live in Tampere) is Finland's oldest city newspaper for the free distribution, published in Tampere, Kangasala, Nokia, Lempäälä, Pirkkala and Ylöjärvi.

== History ==
The first issue of Tamperelainen was published on September 19, 1957. The cover of the first issue contained stories about the author Väinö Linna and the state of the Pyynikki's pines. On the inside were a horoscope compiled by Hymy Lahtinen, a marriage section, a special column on jazz music and the Lääkärin sana doctor column. Other stories told about the actor Eero Roine, the architecture from Tampere and the trip to New York.

When the magazine was distributed to every home, many thought it was a sample issue for a new magazine to subscribe to. Urpo Lahtinen, the magazine's editor-in-chief and later publisher and owner of Lehtimiehet Oy, was able to reassure readers that the magazine's entry is indeed free. It was rumored in the city that the author Väinö Linna, who appeared on the cover of the next issue, would be behind the existence of the magazine.

== Circulation ==
In December 2015, the number of editions and distribution of Tamperelainen was increased from 123,000 to 136,000 after the layout and content reform. In June 2016, the total reach of Tamperelainen was 172,000 readers, according to the KMT of the National Media Survey, which is the highest quotation in Tampere history. In November 2016, the Tamperelainen was awarded the second best city newspaper in Finland.

== Controversy ==
Karri Kannala, who was the editor-in-chief of the magazine in 2015–2018, attracted attention with her editorials. Juhana Suoniemi, the city councilor of The Greens, stopped working as a columnist in November 2015 when he viewed the "Will "libtards" eyes open?" editorial as spreading anger and fear. Some of the townspeople attached "No Racist Tamperelainen Newspaper Here" tags to their mailboxes, and Anna Kontula, a member of the Left Alliance, also ended her blog in the magazine.

== See also ==
- Aamulehti
