= Janne Kataja =

Finnish entertainer (born 1980)

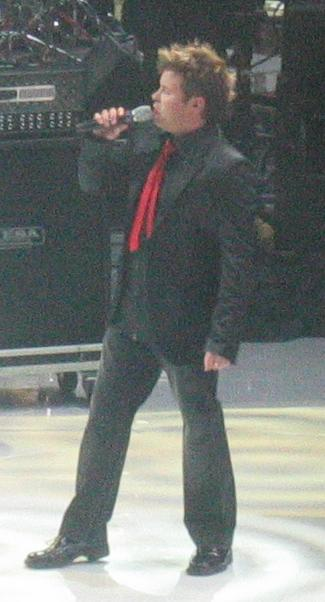
Janne Kataja at the Hartwall Arena in the Elämä lapselle concert on 12 September 2007

Janne Kataja (born 5 April 1980) is a Finnish entertainer. As well as working as a magician, he also works as a stand up comedian, an actor and a host.

== Career ==
Kataja started his theatre career as a child assistant at the Riihimäki Theatre and at the age of ten he continued his career as an actor at the Riihimäki Youth Theatre, where he has since worked extensively. Later, he has acted at the Riihimäki Theatre and also worked there as a chief of information and marketing. He has worked as a director in the Riihimäki Youth Theatre and a summer theatre. During Easter from 1997 to 2000 Kataja acted as the Easter Bunny Eko-Riksu, visiting schools, kindergartens and Easter events in Riihimäki and in a morning TV show. Janne Kataja worked as a member of the culture and leisure board of the city of Riihimäki from 2005 to 2008.

In 2007, Janne Kataja hosted the Idols Extra on Sub TV, in autumn 2007 and 2008 he hosted the Big Brother Extra and in 2011 he hosted the Idols Studio. He has appeared as the second host of the Hei me leivotaan! show in 2007. Janne Kataja has also developed the so-called "penguin dance".

In early 2009, Komediateatteri Arena started the show Spede ja Kumppanit, where Kataja plays the late Ere Kokkonen.

On 3 January 2011, Kataja started as the second host of the Aamun Radio show at Radio Nova. On television, he has hosted the Idols Studio and the entertainment show Teräspallit. His job at Radio Nova ended on 30 November 2011. In the start of 2012, Kataja started as the host of Radio SuomiPOP and has hosted the Tuntematon hieroja entertainment show on Jim in May 2012. In autumn 2012, Kataja was one of the three new judges on the talent show Talent Suomi.

== Family and education ==
Kataja was born in Kouvola, but when he was two weeks old, his family moved to Riihimäki. He studied for two years at the expression-oriented school Kallion luokio in Helsinki, but quit his studies because he already had enough profit work. In autumn 2000, he started studying as a theatre director at the Art Academy of the Turku University of Applied Sciences He had not yet finished his master work in April 2007. In autumn 2007, Kataja got engaged to his girlfriend Ulla. They were married in May 2008. Janne and Ulla have two daughters, born in 2008 and 2010. In 2012 they filed for divorce but the application failed to pass.

== TV shows ==
- Riihimäkeläisiä (1999)
- Idols Extra (spring 2007)
- Kesäillan valssi (summer from 2007 to 2010)
- Big Brother Extra (autumn 2007 and autumn 2008)
- Hei me leivotaan! (autumn 2007)
- Eilen, tässä ja nyt (2008)
- Katajan marjat (Internet TV show, autumn 2008 and autumn 2009)
- Power of 10 (2009)
- Muodin huipulle Extra (autumn 2009)
- Teräspallit (2010)
- Suomi laulaa (2010)
- Neljän tähden illallinen (2010)
- Idols Studio (2011)
- Aatami ja Eeva (2011)
- Tuntematon hieroja (2012)
- Talent Suomi (2012), judge
- Splash! (2013)
- Tuubi (2014)
- Hyvät kaupat (2016)
- Korpelan kujanjuoksu (2016 - 2018)
- Kuokkavieras Kataja (2016)
- Kaikki vastaan 1 (2017 - 2018)
- Napakymppi (2017 - 2019), host
- Arctic Circle (2018 - 2019)
- Swingers (2018)
- Huuma (2019)
- Keihäsmatkat (2020)
- Masked Singer Suomi (2020), permanent panelist
- Suurmestari (2020)
- Hymyä! (2022)

== Discography ==
- Hullumies (2014)

== Plays ==
- A role at Siekailematon suku (Lost in Yonkers), Riihimäki Theatre
- A policeman at Hullun kirjoissa ja vähän Eevankin, Riihimäki Theatre
- Sydän rakastaa, Riihimäki summer theatre (2005), director
- A role at Musta komedia, Riihimäki Theatre (premiered 18 March 2006)
- A role at Pata kattilaa soimaa -terassirevyy, Varsin iloinen teatteri (summer 2006)
- A masochist at Pieni kauhukauppa, Riihimäki Youth Theatre (premiered 4 November 2006)
- A visiting role at Haarakonttori, Turku Youth Theatre (summer 2007)
- As Ere Kokkonen at Spede ja Kumppanit, Komediateatteri Arena (spring 2009)
