= Maija-Liisa Lahtinen =

Maija-Liisa Lahtinen (born September, 1949 in Helsinki) is a former director of a Finnish foundation and museum Museum Villa Urpo, which is named after her late husband, Finnish magazine publisher Urpo Lahtinen. Mrs. Lahtinen became notorious in Finland after the foundation she and her late husband had established was involved in multiple lawsuits started by Urpo Lahtinen's undistributed estate. In spring 2005, Mrs. Lahtinen was sentenced to three years in prison for gross fraudulent conversion, after which she disappeared in an apparent attempt to evade the prison sentence. Currently, she is living in Switzerland. There is a request from the Finnish authorities for the Swiss counterparts to return her to Finland, but by Swiss law, she cannot be sent to Finland. She is wanted by the Interpol after a request by Finnish officials. Her location in Switzerland is known to Finnish police and press. The civil and criminal lawsuits around the case are still largely open, and some of the lawsuits cannot be continued without the presence of Mrs. Lahtinen. In 2006, the court declared Mrs. Lahtinen bankrupt, because she had been ordered to compensate over 13 million euros to Urpo Lahtinen's undistributed estate in one of the lawsuits.
