= Vexi Salmi =

Finnish lyricist (1942–2020)

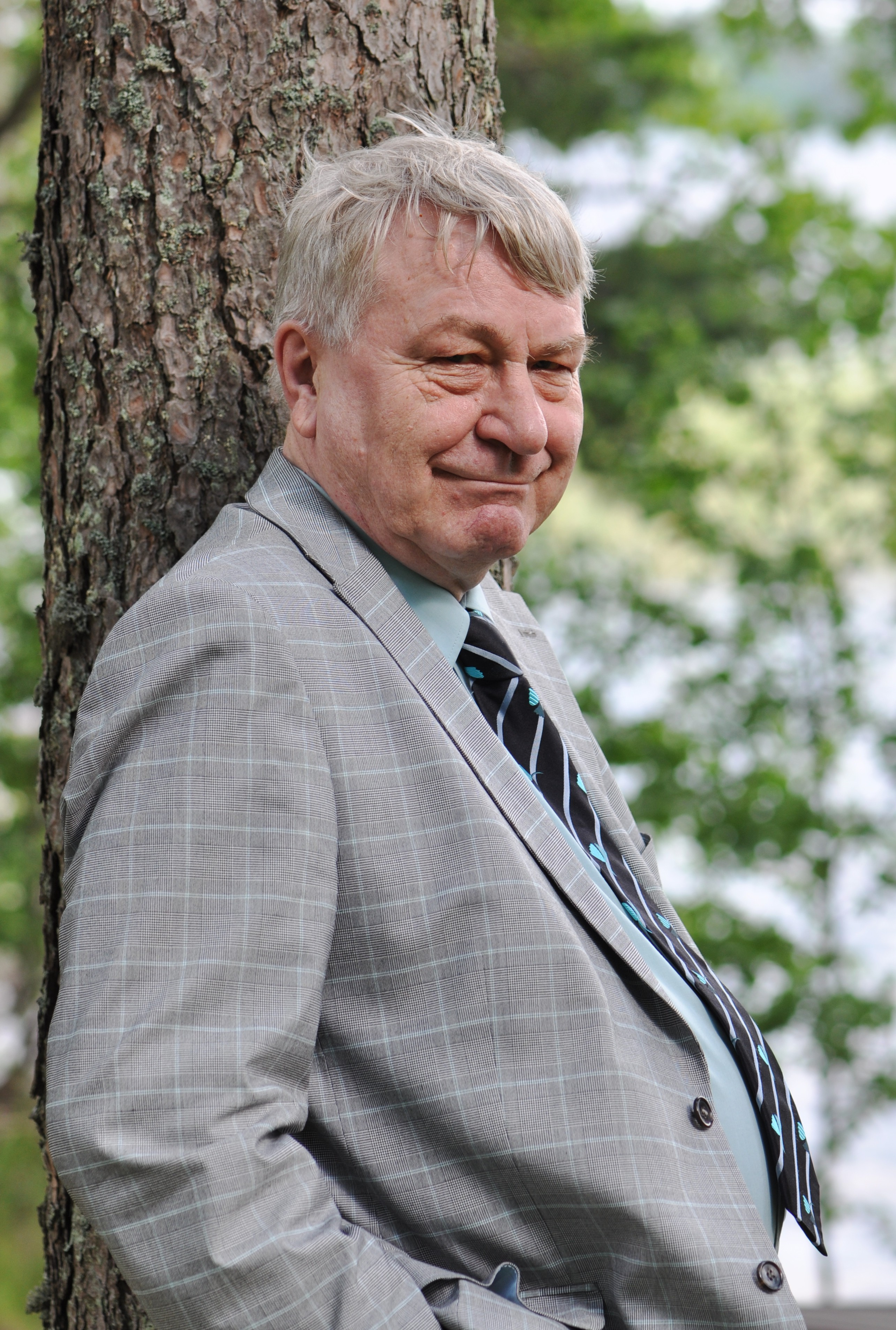
- Vexi Salmi in 2009

Background information
- Also known as: Bertil Berg, Bill Black, Lars Luode, Leo Länsi, Antero Ollikainen, PA, Pasi Penttilä, Rudolf Van Pornoff, Emil Retee, Emil von Retee, Irja Tähde
- Born: Veikko Olavi Salmi; 21 September 1942; Hämeenlinna, Finland
- Died: 8 September 2020 (aged 77) Helsinki, Finland
- Occupation: Lyricist
- Years active: 1965–2020

Veikko Olavi "Vexi" Salmi (Finnish pronunciation: [ˈʋeksi ˈsɑlmi]; 21 September 1942 – 8 September 2020) was a Finnish lyricist. He wrote the lyrics to numerous popular songs for several prominent artists, including Irwin Goodman, Jari Sillanpää, and Katri Helena. His career as a lyricist began in the 1960s and continued until his death. During his prolific career, he wrote the lyrics for over 4,000 songs, more than 2,400 of which have been recorded. In addition to song lyrics, he authored several novels and one collection of poetry. Salmi's latest work also included collaborating with Ilkka Lipsanen on a 60th anniversary album, and he also acted as a judge on a television program on music lyrics, Biisikärpänen

Salmi was awarded the Juha Vainio Writer's Award in 1993 for his long and successful career as a lyricist. Another music writer's award, the Vexi Salmi Award, was named after him in 2003.

== Biography ==
=== Early life ===
Salmi was born in Hämeenlinna, Finland, on 21 September 1942. His father was a carpenter and his mother a factory worker. He was their second child, and his sister was five years older than he was. Salmi's father died in 1951 after having begun construction on a house, leaving his wife to finish the project.

At an early age, Salmi became friends with Antti Hammarberg. They grew up together on the same street, Rinkelinkatu, and while children, their first song together was "Humalamäki", a joking song they wrote about their neighbour. Hammarberg later started to use the artist name Irwin Goodman and became a popular Finnish folk and rock singer. Salmi wrote the lyrics for most of Goodman's compositions and acted as his manager, and their friendship lasted until Goodman's death in 1991.

=== Career ===
Salmi worked for the Musiikki-Fazer record company in the mid-1960s and became a professional lyrics writer as well as a translator of international hits into Finnish. The company's production manager, Toivo Kärki, reluctantly took the beginning lyricist under his wing and taught him for five years, making him at first read Aristotle's Poetics and learn musical notation. During his time at Fazer, Salmi wrote numerous hit songs, including two consecutive winners of the Syksyn sävel song contest for Goodman. In 1974, he also wrote the lyrics for three Eurovision Song Contest candidates. The most successful of these songs was "Anna kaikkien kukkien kukkia", composed by Kärki and performed by Markku Aro.

Yleisradio (YLE), the Finnish Broadcasting Corporation, censored or banned several of Goodman's songs due to lyrics, often written by Salmi, that they considered to be of a "suspicious nature". One of Salmi's songs to be censored was "Ei tippa tapa" ("One Drop Doesn't Kill"), a song which YLE viewed as a glorification of alcohol and drunkenness.

Salmi left Fazer in 1977, after not getting a position as a production manager as he had hoped. He founded a record company, Levytuottajat Oy, and a number of well-known artists recorded for his label. In the 1980s, the label produced several albums that achieved gold records, for artists including Vesa-Matti Loiri and Jörgen Petersen.

When Irwin Goodman made a successful comeback in 1984, Salmi once again provided lyrics for his songs. In 1988, Goodman's most popular album Rentun ruusu was released. The same year, Salmi also collaborated on Kirka's Surun pyyhit silmistäni, which became the best-selling album in Finland at the time with 210,000 copies sold.

The economic depression of the early 1990s was a difficult time for Salmi and his production companies; both Levytuottajat Oy and his other record company, Flamingo Music, went bankrupt in 1996. Since then, Salmi has made his living as a freelance writer and lyricist, authoring multiple novels, biographies, and a book of poetry.

=== Death ===
Salmi died on 8 September 2020 from a rapidly progressing disease. He was 77 years old at the time.

== Popular lyrical works ==
During his career, Salmi has written and translated lyrics for hundreds of songs, including several popular hits, some of which are listed below.

- "Seine" (Tarja Lunnas)
- "Rentun ruusu" (Irwin Goodman)
- "Surun pyyhit silmistäni" (Kirka)
- "Elämän valttikortit" (Ahti Lampi)
- "Ruusu joka vuodesta" (Reijo Taipale)
- "Sydämeeni joulun teen" (Vesa-Matti Loiri)
- "Kaduilla tuulee" (Jari Sillanpää)
- "Ei tippa tapa" (Goodman)
- "Haistakaa paska koko valtiovalta" (Goodman)
- "St. Pauli ja Reeperbahn" (Goodman)
- "Poing poing poing" (Goodman)
- "Ryysyranta" (Goodman)
- "Työmiehen lauantai" (Goodman)
- "Lievestuoreen Liisa" (Goodman)
- "Huilumies" (Loiri)
- "Eviva Espanja" (Marion Rung)
- "Mahtava peräsin ja pulleat purjeet" (Solistiyhtye Suomi)
- "Vaskikellot" (Antti Huovila)
- "Yksinäinen pitkä tie" (Janne Tulkki)
- "Prinsessa" (Laura Voutilainen)
- "Asfalttiviidakko" (Anne Mattila)
- "Katson sineen taivaan" (Katri Helena)
- "Nainen, poliisi ja taksi" (Leo Jokela)
- "Kung Fu taistelee" (Frederik)

== Bibliography ==
- Raha ratkaisee (about Irwin Goodman) (Karisto, 1967)
- Noomit (satirical novel) (Karisto, 1982)
- Lautturin lauluja (poems) (Karisto, 1983)
- Siniset mokkakengät (novel) (WSOY, 1993)
- Mikä laulaen tulee (novel) (WSOY, 1994)
- Rantaravintola (novel) (WSOY, 1995)
- Elvis elää! (novel) (WSOY, 1997)
- Kari Tapio – Olen suomalainen (Kari Tapio's biography) (WSOY, 2002)
- Vinyylin rahinaa (WSOY, 2003)
- Seitsemän suurta satua riimein (WSOY, 2006)
- Minun Hämeenlinnani (Karisto Oy, 2009)
- Rinkelinkadun pojat (Hämeenlinnan Kirjakauppa Oy, 2009)
- Huuto kuului Hauholle saakka – HPK:n pitkä tie mestaruuteen (HPK/Edustusjääkiekko Ry, 2009)
