= Juha Vainio =

Finnish singer-songwriter, lyricist and teacher (1938–1990)

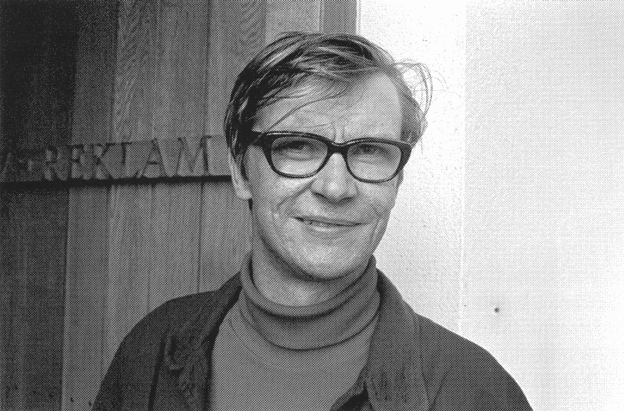
- Vainio in 1968

Background information
- Also known as: Junnu, Junnu Kaihomieli, Jorma Koski, Ilkka Lähde, Mirja Lähde, Kirsi Sunila, Heikki Ilmari
- Born: Juha Harri Vainio; 10 May 1938
- Origin: Kotka, Finland
- Died: 29 October 1990 (aged 52)
- Occupations: lyricist, composer, singer
- Years active: 1963–1990

Juha Harri Vainio, also known as Juha "Watt" Vainio (10 May 1938 – 29 October 1990) was a Finnish lyricist, singer, composer and teacher. With the lyrics or music to over 2,400 songs to his name, Vainio is one of Finland's most prolific lyricists along with Sauvo Puhtila, Reino Helismaa and Vexi Salmi. Vainio enjoyed a short professional career as a teacher at Kymenranta Primary School.

Vainio began writing songs in the early 1960s and continued until his death. Apart from his home town Kotka, he lived for several years in Helsinki and Espoo. In his last years Vainio lived in Gryon, Switzerland, where he died of a heart attack in October 1990. He is buried in the family grave in Helsinki.

He was given the nickname "Watt" on account of his first solo single, the 1964 Paras rautalankayhtye ("The Best Rautalanka Band"). Never used by itself, the nickname was always part of "Juha Watt Vainio".

== Biography ==
=== Family and childhood ===
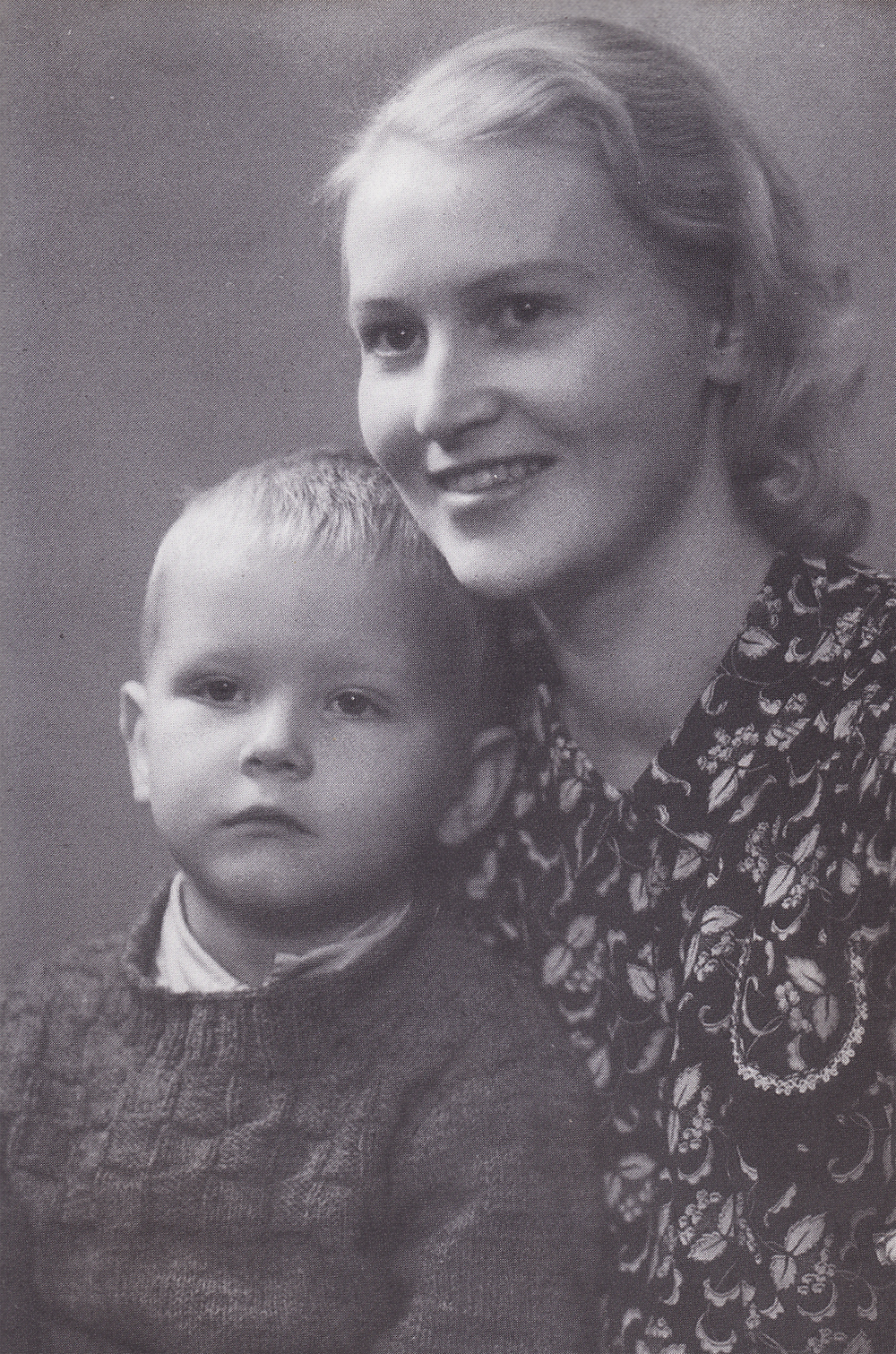
Juha Vainio with his mother Kaarina

Juha Harri Vainio was born on 10 May 1938, in Kotka, the first child of Tauno and Kaarina Vainio. He spent much of his early childhood in Vuoksenniska, Imatra. His two siblings were Marja (born 1944) and Markku (born 1946).

Vainio's grandfather, Emil Alajääski, changed his name to Vainio soon after the turn of the century. Vainio's family on his father's side boasted many athletes whilst Kaarina Vainio had some athletic background. After becoming engaged to Kaarina in 1937, Tauno Vainio worked in Vuoksenniska as a regional head of the White Guard, and was known as a man of principle. Kaarina Vainio had a middle school education, and Tauno Vainio had graduated as a trade technician.

As a child, Juha Vainio loved singing and the family's neighbours often asked him to come over and perform. When the Winter War started in 1939, Juha was too young to understand events. After his father went to war as a captain of the military reserve force, Juha moved with his mother to Metsola, Kotka. As an adult, the only thing Juha Vainio remembered from the war were the air-raid sirens and people's anxiety. He once said that he was more afraid of the women next door than the war, but on the other hand admitted that the war left him with emotional scars. His song Eräänlainen sotaveteraani ("Some Kind of War Veteran"), on the album Sellaista elämä on ("That's How Life Is"), echoes these sentiments. Because Kotka was a harbour town and often bombed, Juha and his mother had to often evacuate. Sometimes they went to stay at her mother's cousins during the evacuations where Juha became friends with Olli Miettinen, a cousin of his mother. The two had an age difference of six years. The only brother of Kaarina Vainio, Mauno, was killed in the war.

In 1945, the Vainios moved into a detached house in Metsola where they lived until 1950 before moving again to Kotkansaari, in the centre of Kotka. Juha Vainio recalled that the most beautiful years of his childhood were spent in Metsola. It was there that he met Nestori Miikkulainen, four years his senior and who later featured in Vainio's song Vanhojapoikia viiksekkäitä ("Moustached Bachelors"). Vainio often spent time in the harbour of Kotka with his friends. He was fond of the sea throughout his life.

As a child Juha Vainio was diagnosed with congenital heart disease, causing his lips to turn blue, and the onset of rapid breathlessness. He underwent a heart operation in early 1949 at the same time as his mother suffered an attack of tuberculosis from which she later recovered. Juha was at first kept in the adults' ward due to the serious nature of the operation, but later transferred to the children's ward to recover. He soon went home and began to get better.

=== School ===
Juha Vainio's education did not start well. Frustrated with school he was once absent for three weeks without permission. After primary school he attended a gymnasium in Kotka. At the same time his family moved from Metsola to Kotkansaari. During his school years, Vainio's best friend was Risto "Tiso" Warjus, two years his senior. They both sang in the Kotka Gymnasium choir. Vaino's music teacher at the gymnasium, Arvo Vainio, was nicknamed "Junnu" on account of his big nose resembling that of a comic book character of the same name. Later on the name was given to Juha Vainio because he had the same surname as the teacher.

When he was fifteen, Vainio felt sure he would become a writer. As a young man he read a book about poetics, and later said that the rules were easy to break once he had learned them. It became apparent in essays written whilst at the gymnasium that Juha had talent as a writer. However, teachers sometimes had mixed feelings about his writing; at one time he received no grade for a lighthearted column-like text he had written, because the teacher felt that it could not be graded as an essay. Although essays were his strong point, school was uninteresting for Juha. He considered quitting school, but the principal persuaded him to change his mind. He was transferred to another school and was later joined there by his friend Risto Warjus. In the end, the only school subjects in which Vainio excelled were singing and sports.

Around 1957 Vainio's family moved from the centre of Kotka to near the harbour. After a few years they moved again, this time to a neighbourhood near Sibeliuspuisto. From childhood, Juha Vainio practiced sport even though before surgery he had suffered from heart problems. He liked football and basketball, which were very popular in Kotka and also practiced high jump together with Tiso Warjus. After his heart operation, Juha's physical condition deteriorated, but doing sport helped him improve it.

=== First contact with music ===
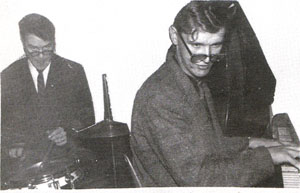
Juha Vainio (right) in restaurant Fennia in 1957

Juha Vainio became interested in music and started socializing with musicians in the mid-1950s. The centre of jazz music in Kotka was the restaurant Fennia where performers including Keijo Laitinen and the cousin of Vainio's mother, Olli Miettinen played. Although Vainio was under-21 and classed as a minor, he managed to slip into the restaurant where he presented his lyrics to the musicians and was occasionally allowed to play the piano. Vainio recalled that his friends remembered him as being always penniless. He started drinking more and more, often asking his friends for a drink.

In late 1956 Vainio lived next door to one of his musician friends, Heikki Kauppinen, who was three years his senior. Vainio also became acquainted with drummer Erkki Liikanen. The friends had different tastes in music with Olli Miettinen and Reijo "Rempo" Tani listening to jazz, while Vainio liked schlager music. Vainio later named and described many of his friends in his song lyrics.

Vainio was called up in 1957 for service in the Finnish army. He was 19 years old and in the penultimate grade of gymnasium. However, he did not want to start his military service right after the matriculation exams, because he wanted to find a profession first. The next spring, the last year of gymnasium, he decided to go to Paris for the holidays with his friend Pekka. Vainio was supposed to pass his matriculation exams in the spring of 1959, but he failed the Swedish exam and had to wait until the autumn to pass it.

=== Fatherhood, teaching and military service ===
In Fennia, Juha Vainio met his future wife Taina Kaukonen. When Taina became pregnant in early 1960, Juha's parents scolded the young father. As a result, the couple married in the summer of 1960 and a son Ilkka followed in October of the same year. Juha and Taina had three more children: Sami in 1961, Kalle in 1963 and Kati in 1967. At first the young couple lived at Juha's parents', but moved to Helsinki when Juha started his studies there. He studied at the Yhteiskunnallinen korkeakoulu (School of Social Sciences, which later became the University of Tampere) and later the Opettajakorkeakoulu (School of Vocational Teacher Education) where he graduated as a school teacher.

Juha Vainio taught higher classes at Yläpää Primary School where the pupils informally called him "Junnu". His teaching methods were relaxed, such as making the pupils sing a children's song instead of a hymn in the morning. The pupils could also eat and watch television with Vainio. In 1964 he had a temporary absence from teaching due to military service. Already having some reputation as a lyricist, whilst in the army Vainio was assigned to write the lyrics for the new cadence of the Karelia Brigade. Vainio finished his military service in the autumn of 1964, at the age of 26.

=== Breakthrough ===
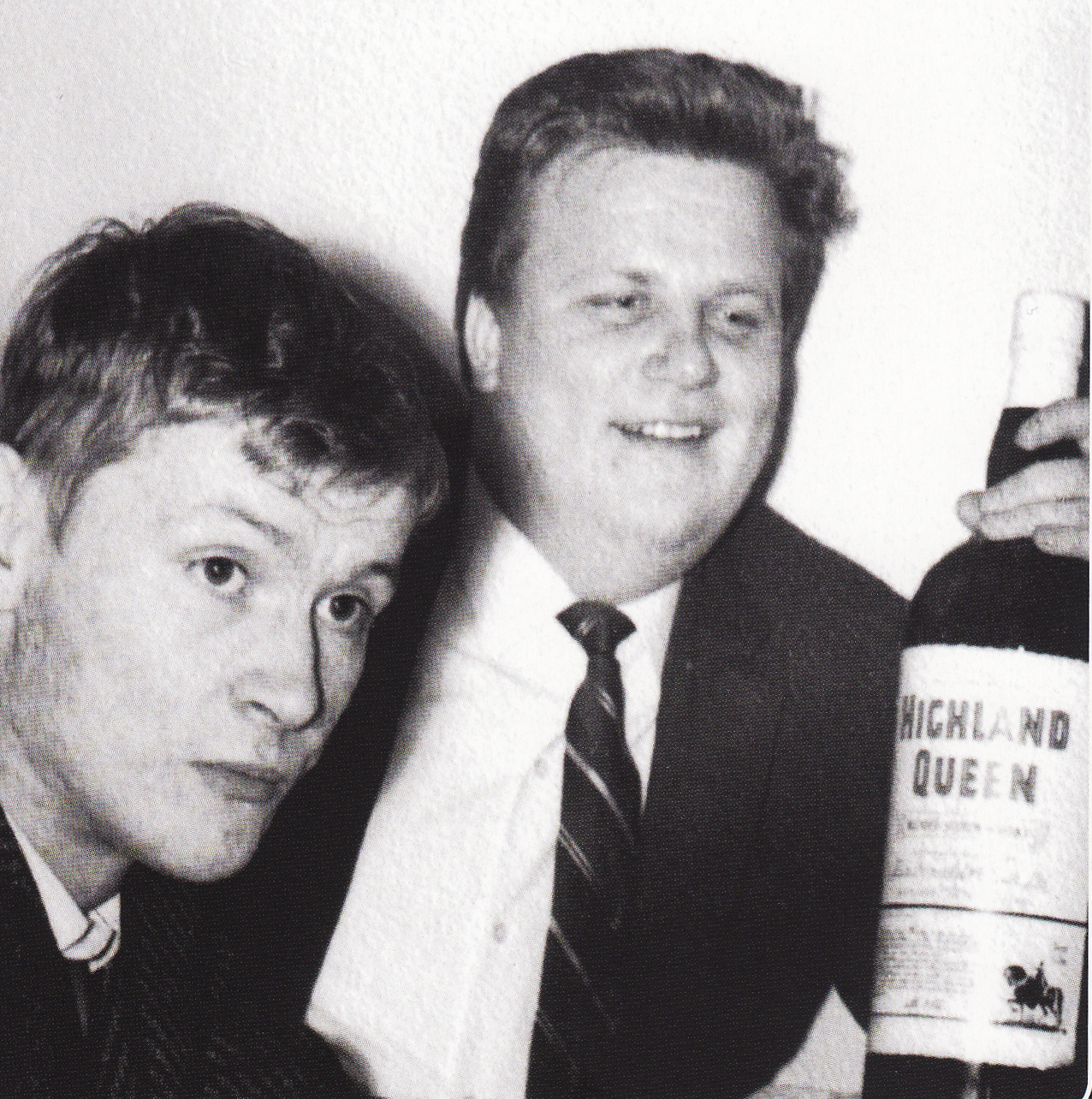
Laitinen in the song "Vanha salakuljettaja Laitinen" was named after Keijo Laitinen (right). Juha Vainio on the left.

Vainio's musical influences included Tapio Rautavaara, Georg Malmstén and Henry Theel. As a young man he trained to play music because he wanted to become a professional musician. He started writing lyrics for friends' bands, and his texts brought him some fame. Vainio was above all a lyricist; he wrote lyrics or music for over 2,400 published songs, the majority of which were recorded by others. Many of Vainio's lyrics were written for Toivo Kärki's compositions. He translated popular foreign songs into Finnish, work that he later abandoned since translators only received a fixed payment for their work rather than royalties.

At the beginning of his career, comedian Spede Pasanen asked Vainio and his friends to play in a radio show called Ruljanssiriihi ("Thrashing House of Rigmarole"). The band accepted, and after Pasanen gave up the radio show to start his television career, the musicians followed him. They played in Pasanen's shows including Speden saluuna ("Spede's Saloon") and 50 pientä minuuttia ("50 Small Minutes").

With the help of his friend Erkki Liikanen, Vainio got a record deal with recording company Finndisc. His debut single, Paras rautalankayhtye was recorded in 1964. At the same time Vainio received the nickname "Watt", which was printed on the front cover of the single. Vainio wrote lyrics for several performers, including Katri Helena. In 1965 his parents and siblings moved to Helsinki, and at about the same time Vainio and his family moved to Espoo, where they lived for over 25 years. In 1966 he lost a good friend when Olli Miettinen died at the age of 34.

Vainio's songs Mistä löydän ystävän ("Where Do I Find a Friend") and Maanantaitango ("Monday Tango") had already been recorded by Katri Helena in 1963 before Vainio's military service. After leaving the army, Vainio befriended composer and music journalist Sauvo Puhtila (known to the Finnish public by the pseudonym Saukki), who told him that Yleisradio was in need of lyricists. Eager to leave his job as a teacher, Vainio quit and started collaborating with musician Reino Markkula. Their song Sä kuulut päivään jokaiseen ("You Belong in Every Day"), composed by Markkula with lyrics by Vainio, was given to Eino Grön who made it into a hit.

Vainio worked at Fazer Music as a lyricist with monthly salary and at the same time wrote his own songs. He translated several international hits into Finnish, including Piilopaikka ("Hideout", originally "You've Got Your Troubles") by Danny and Nyt meni hermot ("Now I'm Furious"), which became the breakthrough recording of pop group "The First". Vainio was often late for arranged studio sessions, which irritated the bands and the company's management. At 30, Vainio wrote one of his best-known translations, Fredi's Kolmatta linjaa takaisin ("Back along Kolmas Linja"). Another success was his translation of The Beatles' "Penny Lane", recorded by Pepe Willberg as Rööperiin ("To Rööperi"). Although Vainio's version is set in Helsinki, he has said he was thinking about Kotka when he wrote the lyrics.

In addition to writing songs for others, Vainio became a popular solo artist. He also wrote the music to several of his songs, despite never considering himself a singer or a composer but above all a lyricist. At first he worked with Pertti Metsärinne's orchestra, recording the song "Hum-Boogie" (wordplay on the word humpuuki, meaning "humbug"). Among his first recorded songs were Jos vain saisin nastahampaan takaisin ("If Only I Would Get the Spike Tooth Back") from 1964 and Suolaa, suolaa, enemmän suolaa ("Salt, Salt, More Salt") along with Juhannustanssit ("Midsummer's Ball") from 1965. All were included on Vainio's debut album, Juha "Watt" Vainio.

In the mid-1960s Vainio had success with Sellanen ol' Viipuri ("Such Was Viipuri"), Turistit tuppukylään ("Tourists Arrive in the Small Town") and a song written with Erik Lindström, Herrat Helsingin ("Big Shots of Helsinki"). When the Finndisc company was sold to Scandia, Vainio and Lindström's collaboration ended. Vaino soon afterwards became acquainted with composer Jaakko Salo, who was introduced to him by Saukki. He started writing lyrics for composer Toivo Kärki, who had lost his primary lyricist Reino Helismaa in January 1965.

Well-known songs from the late 1960s and early 1970s included Suomi–Ruotsi ("Finland–Sweden") and the 1971 release Matkarakastaja ("Travelling Lover"), which met with criticism. While Vainio's early albums were collections of singles, he recorded his first proper studio album in 1972. The album Viisari värähtää ("The Pointer Twitches") included the song Kaunissaari (a reference to a place in Finland), which Vainio recorded several times during his career. It was also included on his next album, Tulin, näin ja soitin ("I Came, I Saw, I Played"), which was released in 1975. Although Matkarakastaja and Viisari värähtää were Vainio's earliest published compositions, it was not until the late 1970s that he began to compose music more actively.

In 1966 Vainio befriended Vexi Salmi and Irwin Goodman. The trio made a summer tour called Kansalle mitä kansa haluaa ("Give People What the People Want") but at times Vainio was too intoxicated to perform. Vainio and Reijo Tani made a collection of singles in 1968 called Juha "Watt" Vainio ja Reijo Tani. The album included Vainio's Kauhea kankkunen ("Horrible Hangover") and Vanha salakuljettaja Laitinen ("Old Smuggler Laitinen"), which were both collaborations with Toivo Kärki. The latter song was named after Keijo Laitinen, a good friend of Vainio's. In 1970 Vainio started writing causeries with Gunnar Mattsson.

=== Back to teaching ===
Vainio returned to teaching in the early 1970s. Vainio made up nicknames for all his pupils, who in return called him Junnu. He had a habit of coming up with very unorthodox methods of punishment but in general got on well with his pupils. Often late and in the habit of leaving a lot of paperwork unfinished, shortly before he quit teaching Vainio organized an excursion for the pupils to express his gratitude for the time he had spent with them.

=== Alcohol use ===
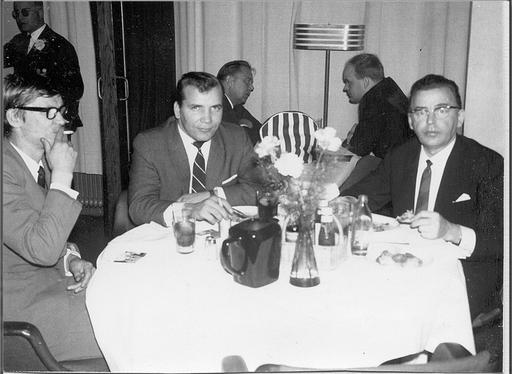
Juha Vainio (left) with Eino Grön and Olavi Virta in 1965

As time went by, Vainio consumed more and more alcohol. In the late 1960s he frequented Tapion Tuoppi with Gunnar Mattsson and Aarre Elo. He often carried a hip flask in case he ran out of something to drink. Vainio's deteriorating family relationships are considered to be one reason for his drinking. Many of his friends were heavy drinkers as well but despite his drinking problem, he always managed to finish his lyrics on time.

Vainio's friends Heikki Kauppinen and Reijo Tani quit drinking in 1972, and at first Vainio found their decision odd. When Vexi Salmi was hired by Fazer in 1970, Vainio and Salmi started drinking together often and sometimes even came to work with hangovers. On one occasion, Vainio forgot that he was supposed to have finished the text of an advertising tune. When the deadline arrived, Vainio was too hung over to finish the lyrics and eventually Salmi agreed to help by writing the lyrics for Vainio's composition. Vainio's alcohol use increased in the 1970s, and his parents watched without being able to do anything about it. It is reported that Vainio would not go to sleep at night unless he had liquor under his bed, and he always kept a bottle with him. Vainio began to realize that he could not live like this forever. By summer 1975 he decided that he needed to stop drinking altogether. He was especially helped in this decision through his meeting footballer Kai Pahlman, who told Vainio that he was surprised he was still alive. In late 1975, Vainio stayed sober for four months, but then caved in for a short time. In January 1976 he finally managed to quit drinking for good.

Vainio was supported by his friends who had quit drinking a few years earlier, such as Osmo "Osku" Kanerva. Eino Grön, a friend of Vainio's, decided to follow his example and managed to quit a year and a half after Vainio. Vainio never wanted to be called a teetotaler and considered himself a recovered alcoholic. After he quit drinking, Vainio's songs became more serious and more sensitive, although he still wrote humorous lyrics as well.

Although Vainio himself did not consume alcohol, he was tolerant about others' alcohol use and could spend time with his friends even if they drank, keeping alcohol in his house in case his friends came over. He also began discussing the topic of drinking in his lyrics. Getting rid of his alcohol problem did not solve Vainio's domestic problems; he and Taina ended up divorcing.

=== Changes ===
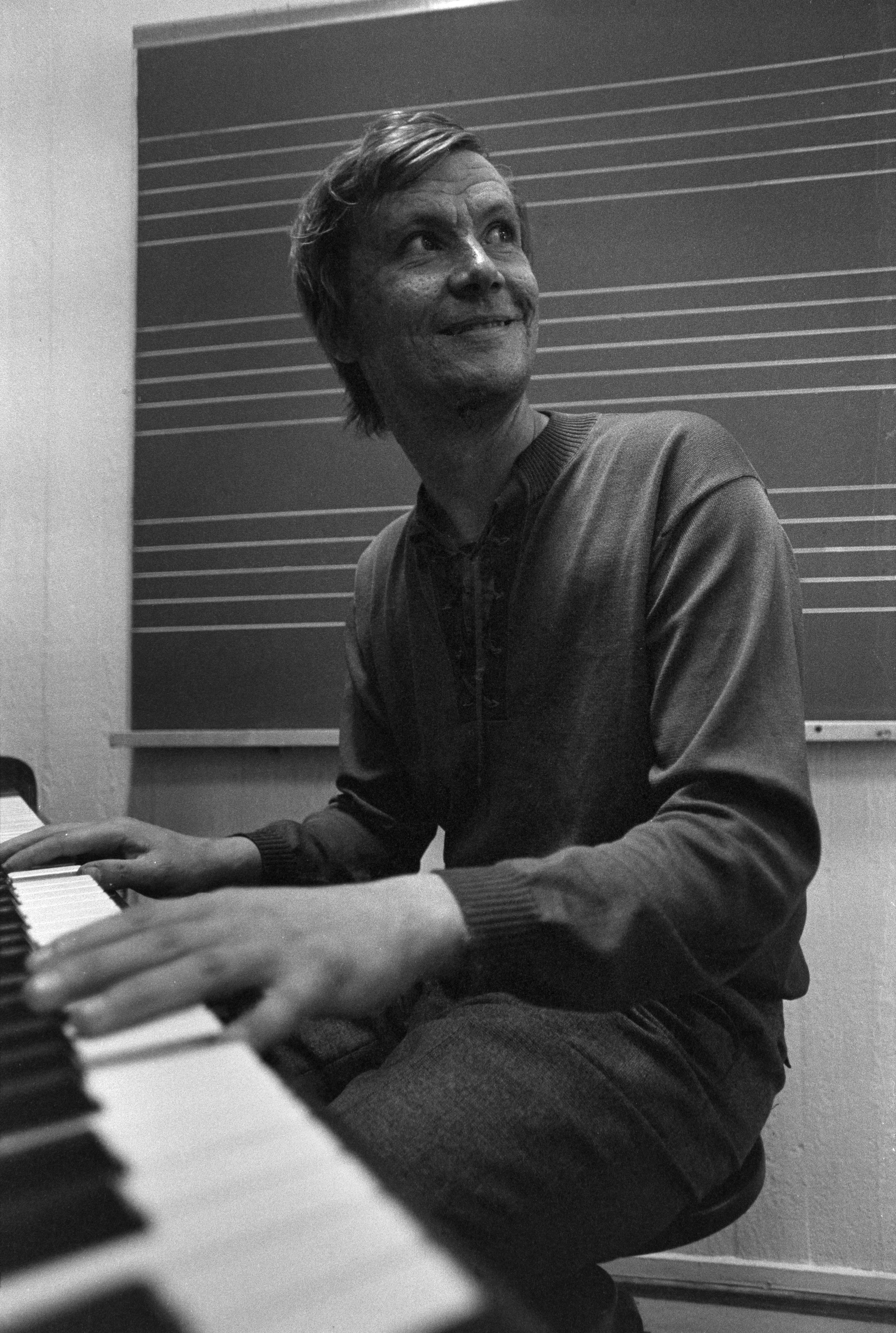
Juha Vainio in 1971

Juha Vainio and Pedro Hietanen at Syksyl Sävel music competition in 1987

After his divorce, Vainio's life slowly began to change. Creatively he was more prolific than ever in the late 1970s and 1980s. He began composing in addition to writing lyrics. He worked a lot with Veikko Samuli and Jaakko Salo, and Salo started arranging songs Vainio had written.

In 1976 Vainio's Jawohl, jawohl from Kansi kiinni ja kuulemiin ("Shut the Lid and Goodbye") was criticized for its commentary about German tourists who visit Lapland. The album also featured a sensitive song, Mä uskon huomispäivään ("I Believe in Tomorrow"). Other well-known songs from the album are Playboy 60 v ("Playboy 60 yrs"), Suomi–Ruotsi ("Finland–Sweden") and Taas lapsuuden maisemiin ("Back Again to Where I Grew Up").

Vainio began composing actively in the late 1970s, although he had already published his own compositions at the beginning of the decade. His earliest compositions include Matkarakastaja and Viisari värähtää. Among his most popular songs from the late 1970s is Käyn ahon laitaa ("I Walk by the Side of a Glade") from the 1979 album of the same name. Even though Vainio had already quit drinking, he still occasionally sang about alcohol. Vainio started writing more sensitive songs, a trend which became evident in his next albums. 1981's Albatrossi ja sorsa ("The Albatross and the Duck") contains one of Vainio's most well-known songs, Albatrossi. The topic of the song was lost youth. Another sensitive song on the album is Apteekin ovikello ("The Pharmacy Doorbell"), the idea for which Vainio got from Tapio Rautavaara. Other well-known songs were Panaman konsuli ("The Consul of Panama") and Kun mä rupesin ryyppäämään ("When I Started Drinking").

In 1976, Vainio was hired to write a number of bawdy songs which were later released on cassette tape. Vainio wrote a part of the songs and sang on the record with all musicians using pseudonyms, Vainio's being Junnu Kaihomieli. Many of the songs were based on a familiar melody whose copyright had already expired; for example, the song Kumi-Roope ("Rubber Roope") was an obscene version of the folk song Rosvo-Roope ("Roope the Robber"). In 1979 Vainio participated in another recording of similar songs. The songs were released on compact disc in 1992 and 1997 as Pahojen poikien lauluja 1–2 ("Bad Boys' Songs 1–2") and Porno-ooppera / Pahojen poikien lauluja 3 ("Porn Opera / Bad Boys' Songs 3"). Both records went gold.

In 1982 Vainio collaborated with bodybuilder Kike Elomaa when they sang together on the single Kunto nousee sullakin ("You'll Get in Shape Too"), with lyrics by Vainio. The B-side of the single was Pokkana ja paikallaan ("Serious and Still"), sung by Elomaa alone. A compilation album called Sellaista elämä on ("That's How Life Is") followed in 1983, consisting of the most popular songs Vainio had himself recorded. 1985's Elämää ja erotiikkaa ("Life and Erotica") was Vainio's last finished studio album. Popular pieces from the album included Aleks ja Jaan ("Aleks and Jaan"), Heiskasen kanssa kun heiluttiin ("When We Hung Out with Heiskanen") and Yksinäinen saarnipuu ("Lonely Ash Tree").

After his divorce, Vainio had started dating Pirkko Heikkala. The couple were married on 27 December 1981 in Kuusamo. In 1983 they had a daughter, Suvi. The couple moved to Switzerland in the late 1980s. In 1988 Katri Helena, Eino Grön, Pave Maijanen and other popular artists performed at a concert organized to celebrate Vainio's 50th birthday.

=== Death ===
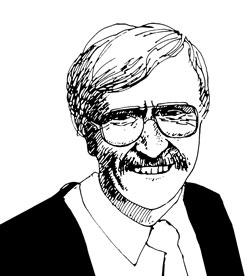
Artist's view of Juha Vainio

Vainio's childhood heart problems surfaced again in 1990 with his sister Marja recalling that he often placed his hand over his heart. He had even finished writing his will. At one time Vainio was travelling to Florida with his friend, composer Veikko Samuli. Vainio had to go to the bathroom during the flight, and soon there was a call for a doctor from the flight crew. Vainio had kept his heart medicines in his pocket, where the box had opened and mixed with his pastilles. Vainio had eaten too much of the medicine by accident, and his heartbeat started to slow down. Once a stewardess found out what had happened, she saved Vainio's life by quickly forcing him to vomit.

Vainio gave his last performance on 12 October 1990. He died of a heart attack in his home in Gryon, Switzerland, on 29 October 1990, in the arms of his wife. He was 52 years old. A burial ceremony was held in the town of Vevey, and Vainio's body brought back to Finland and buried in the family grave in Hietaniemi Cemetery in Helsinki.

The day before he died, Vainio had become friends with ice hockey coach Juhani Tamminen and dined with his family. According to Tamminen, Vainio had been in good condition at the time. The following week Tamminen learned of Vainio's death from a friend who had read about it in a Finnish newspaper.

The record Vainio had worked on during the final years of his life was released posthumously by Scandia in 1991 as Viiskymppisen viisut ("Tunes of a Fifty-year-old"). Especially important for Vainio had been the song Kauan sitten ("Long Ago") which he had recorded in the early 1970s. Vainio's most important collaborator during his last years was producer Jaakko Salo.

== Nicknames and pseudonyms ==
Juha Vainio's best-known nicknames were Junnu and Juha "Watt" Vainio. Junnu was a familiar name also used in connection with his last name as Junnu Vainio. The name Juha "Watt" Vainio was used on the cover of several albums and was a name he was publicly known by. Vainio's friends never used the nickname Watt – for them he always remained Junnu.

Among the pseudonyms used by Vainio were Junnu, Junnu Kaihomieli, Jorma Koski, Ilkka Lähde, Mirja Lähde, Kirsi Sunila and Heikki Ilmari. The name Junnu Kaihomieli was used for Vainio's bawdy songs in the late 1970s.

== Critical commentary ==
Peter von Bagh regards Vainio as the pioneer of Finnish 1960s humorous songs since he began their composition before Irwin Goodman. Producer Jaakko Salo commented that Vainio's career found a new start once Vainio quit drinking. According to him, it is evident from Vainio's texts that his songs are based on his own experiences.

According to writer and film director Jukka Virtanen, Vainio usually wrote his lyrics at the same time as the music. This is evident in the song Vanhojapoikia viiksekkäitä, written as a waltz and whose lyrics feature an aged bachelor who never got to dance at his own wedding. Virtanen has said that while Vainio worked at a fast pace, songs were never easy for him to write. His work did not become easier when he quit drinking, but it did become more emotional.

== Hobbies ==
Vainio frequently played football and basketball in his youth and later on remained an enthusiastic spectator. He wrote the lyrics for ice-hockey team Tappara's anthem Tappara on terästä ("Tappara Is Made of Steel"), which was composed by Reijo Lehtovirta in 1976. Tappara's manager Mikko Westberg asked Vainio to write a song for the team, requesting that the lyrics contain the phrases "Tappara is made of steel" and "rye bread". Vainio became a lifetime fan of Tappara after writing the song.

Vainio was fond of the sea and sailing. He often took his family and friends sailing in his boat, and in 1987 bought an island in Österskär with his wife Pirkko. His love for sailing is evident in the song Kaikki paitsi purjehdus on turhaa ("Everything But Sailing Is Pointless"), which was composed by Lasse Mårtenson.

== Legacy ==
Since Vainio's death many tribute concerts have been staged, with an event to celebrate his 70th birthday taking place in May 2008. Vainio's friend, songwriter Jukka Virtanen, wrote a play called Albatrossi ja Heiskanen ("The Albatross and Heiskanen") based on Vainio's songs. It was first performed in his hometown Kotka in 1992 and has been performed many times since. The Finnish film Keisarikunta ("The Empire") describes the youth of Vainio and his friends in Kotka during the 1950s.

The "Juha Vainio Award" (Juha Vainio-palkinto) for writers was introduced in 1991 and is given annually to notable Finnish lyricists with yearly prize money of 5,000 euros (previously 30,000 Finnish markkas). In December 1994, a club named Junnun Lauluseura (Junnu's singing club) was established. Its members include Vainio's friends Keijo Laitinen, Pertti Metsärinne and Reijo Tani. The club has published two books entitled Junnun laululipas 1 and Junnun laululipas 2.

Vainio's work continues to have major relevance in Finnish popular music, an example of which being two Vainio cover albums by Vesa-Matti Loiri in 2003 and 2004.

All of the songs that Vainio recorded were published in 2008 in a CD boxed set Legendan laulut – Kaikki levytykset 1963–1990 ("Songs of the Legend – All Recordings 1963–1990"). It included his advertising jingles, bawdy songs and a book. A compilation album released with the boxed set called Legendan laulut – 48 mestariteosta ("Songs of the Legend – 48 Masterpieces") reached second place on the Finnish album charts. Juha Vainio's son Ilkka Vainio is in the music business and works as a music producer and songwriter.

== Discography ==
- Juha 'Watt' Vainio (1966, compilation of singles)
- Juha 'Watt' Vainio ja Reijo Tani (1968, compilation of singles) (Translation: "Juha 'Watt' Vainio and Reijo Tani")
- Viisari värähtää (1972) (Translation: "The Pointer Twitches")
- Tulin, näin ja soitin (1975) (Translation: "I Came, I Saw, I Played")
- Kansi kiinni ja kuulemiin (1976) (Translation: "Shut the Lid and Goodbye")
- Käyn ahon laitaa (1979) (Translation: "I Walk by the Side of a Glade")
- Albatrossi ja sorsa (1981) (Translation: "The Albatross and the Duck")
- Sellaista elämä on (1983) (Translation: "That's How Life Is")
- Elämää ja erotiikkaa (1985) (Translation: "Life and Erotica")
- Viiskymppisen viisut (1991) (Translation: "Tunes of a Fifty-year-old")
