= Hymy =

Finnish celebrity magazine

- Editor-in-chief: Mika Lahtonen
- Categories: Celebrity magazine
- Frequency: Monthly
- Publisher: Otavamedia Oy
- Founded: 1959; 67 years ago
- Country: Finland
- Based in: Helsinki
- Language: Finnish
- Website: Hymy

Hymy (Finnish: "Smile") is a monthly celebrity magazine published in Helsinki, Finland. It has been in circulation since 1959.

== History and profile ==
Hymy was launched in 1959 by publisher Urpo Lahtinen and named after his wife Hymy Lahtinen. The magazine dealt with the experiences of the low income Finns and is an example of yellow journalism. It is based in Helsinki and is published monthly by Otavamedia Oy.

In the 1960s and 1970s Hymy became a success with sensationalist stories containing much sex and gossip about Finnish celebrities, often verging on the invasion of privacy.

All texts and articles published in the magazine are written by professional journalists. Typical Hymy stories would be about the singer Irwin Goodman, Finland's first openly gay celebrity Monsieur Mosse, or the notorious pictorial on Jörn Donner naked on a Gambian beach with a local underage girl. The most famous writer for Hymy was Veikko Ennala, and probably one of the most infamous stories was about the author Timo K. Mukka. The story allegedly became one of the main causes for the author's early death soon afterwards. This resulted in a Finnish law called the Lex Hymy, regulating any press stories published about private persons.

In March 2008 the magazine published story of the then Finnish Foreign Minister Ilkka Kanerva's SMS messages to erotic dancer Johanna Tukiainen. The magazine also published several of the messages on 1 April 2008 and Kanerva had to step down from his cabinet member position.

The editor-in-chief of Hymy is Mika Lahtonen.

== Circulation ==
In 1970 Hymy had a circulation of 435,000 copies. Its circulation was 904,000 copies in 2007. In 2010 the magazine had a circulation of 88,637 copies. The 2011 circulation of the monthly was 87,876 copies. It fell to 73,788 copies in 2012. The number of its subscribers was 237,000 based on the 2013 data by the Finnish Audit Bureau of Circulations.
