= Kihniö =

- Municipality
- Kihniön kunta Kihniö kommun
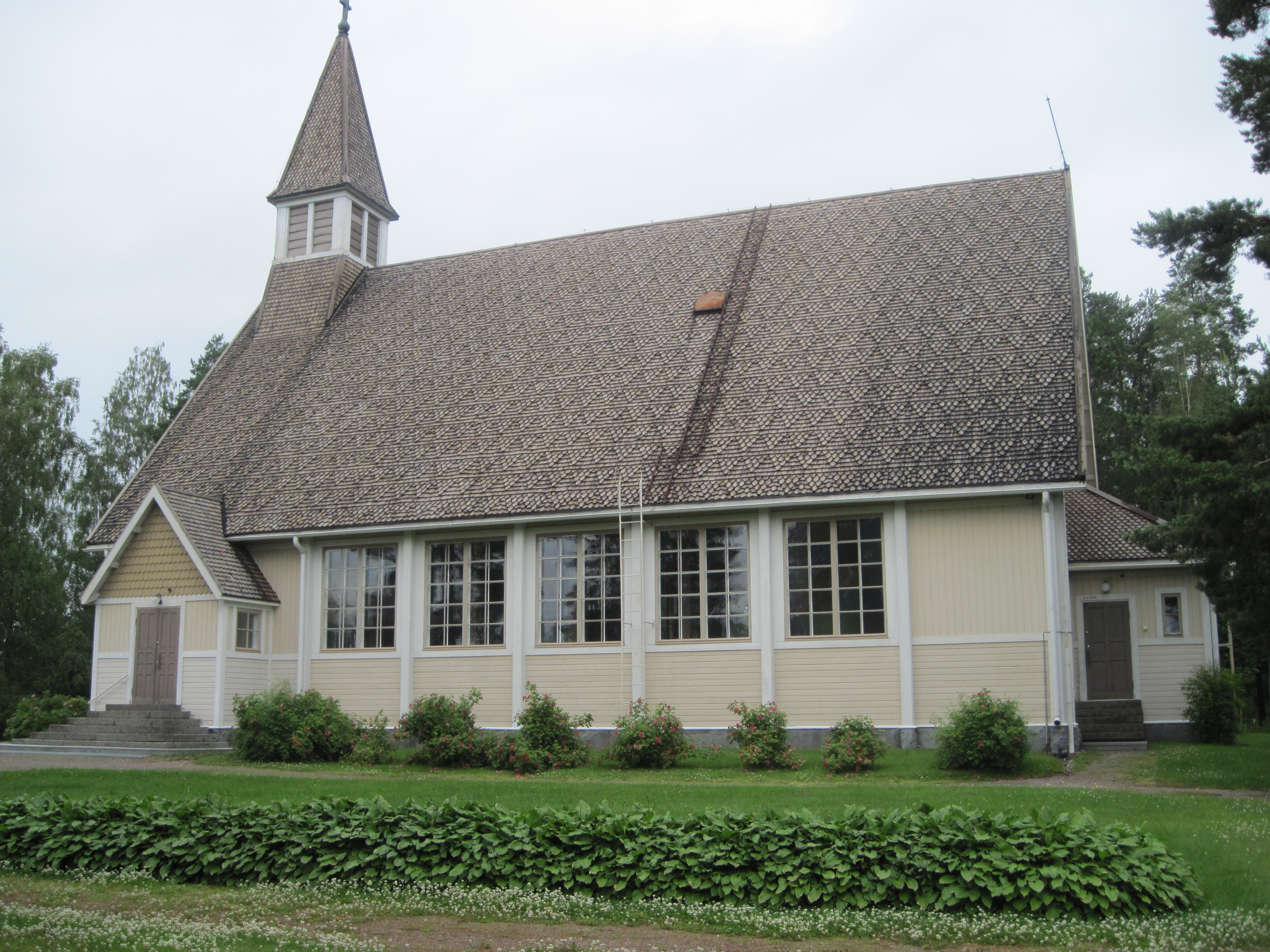

- Coat of arms

- Location of Kihniö in Finland
- Interactive map of Kihniö
- Coordinates: 62°12′30″N 023°10′45″E
- Country: Finland
- Region: Pirkanmaa
- Sub-region: North Western Pirkanmaa
- Charter: 1920

Government
  - Municipal manager: Petri Liukku

Area (2018-01-01)
  - Total: 390.50 km^{2} (150.77 sq mi)
  - Land: 357.22 km^{2} (137.92 sq mi)
  - Water: 33.39 km^{2} (12.89 sq mi)
  - Rank: 215th largest in Finland

Population (2025-12-31)
  - Total: 1,670
  - Rank: 271st largest in Finland
  - Density: 4.67/km^{2} (12.1/sq mi)

Population by native language
  - Finnish: 97.9% (official)
  - Others: 2.1%

Population by age
  - 0 to 14: 11.9%
  - 15 to 64: 53.4%
  - 65 or older: 34.7%
- Time zone: UTC+02:00 (EET)
  - Summer (DST): UTC+03:00 (EEST)
- Website: www.kihnio.fi

Kihniö is a municipality of Finland.

It is located in the region of Pirkanmaa. The municipality has a population of 1,670 (31 December 2025) and covers an area of 390.50 square kilometres (150.77 sq mi) of which 33.39 km^{2} (12.89 sq mi) is water. The population density is 4.67 inhabitants per square kilometre (12.1/sq mi).

The municipality is unilingually Finnish.

== Politics ==
Results of the 2011 Finnish parliamentary election in Kihniö:

- True Finns 53.2%
- Centre Party 15.5%
- Christian Democrats 14.4%
- National Coalition Party 6.5%
- Social Democratic Party 5.9%
- Communist Party of Finland 2.3%
- Green League 1.1%
- Left Alliance 0.5%
- Pirate Party 0.5%

Results of the 2021 Finnish municipal elections, resulted in the True Finns being the largest group on the Kihniö council, in Kihniö.
