= Urpo Lahtinen =

Finnish magazine publisher

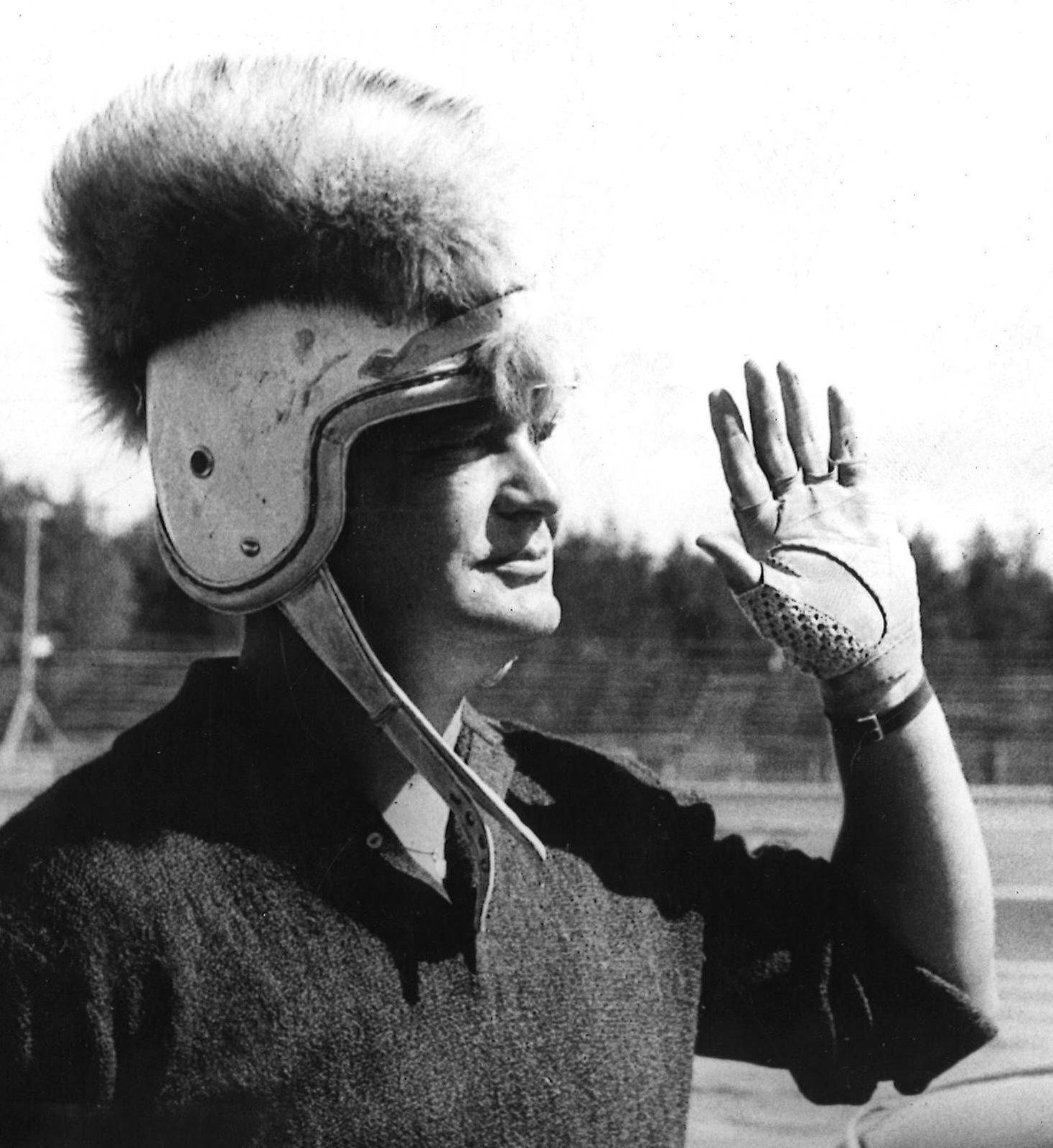
Urpo Lahtinen in 1966.

Urpo Juhani Lahtinen was a Finnish magazine publisher. He was born on 22 April 1931 in Helsinki and died on 15 October 1994 in Tampere. Urpo Lahtinen started his journalistic career in 1952 writing for the Social Democratic paper Eteenpäin in Kotka, continuing in Kansan Lehti of Tampere.

In 1957 he started a free tabloid Tamperelainen (delivered to every household in Tampere), which was published by Lahtinen's own company called Lehtimiehet. Urpo Lahtinen's best-known publication was Hymy ("The Smile") magazine, which was launched in 1959 and was named after his wife Hymy Lahtinen, specializing in "human interest" type of journalism. In the 1960s and 1970s Hymy became a success with its sensationalist and scandal stories containing much celebrity sex and gossip, often verging on the invasion of privacy.

The most famous writer for Hymy was Veikko Ennala, and probably one of the most infamous Hymy stories was about the author Timo K. Mukka, which many thought was one of the main causes to the author's early demise soon afterwards. Lahtinen invested his huge profits in art, and in constructing his luxurious Villa Urpo in Siivikkala. The success also had its negative side on Urpo Lahtinen who became an alcoholic. Lahtinen's company Lehtimiehet was finally sold to Yhtyneet Kuvalehdet for hundreds of millions of Finnish Marks. When Urpo Lahtinen died in 1994 at the age of 63, a court case over his inheritance started between his son Jeppe Lahtinen, his ex-wife Hymy Lahtinen and his widow Maija-Liisa Lahtinen, continuing to this day.
