= Irwin Goodman =

Finnish musical artist (1943–1991)

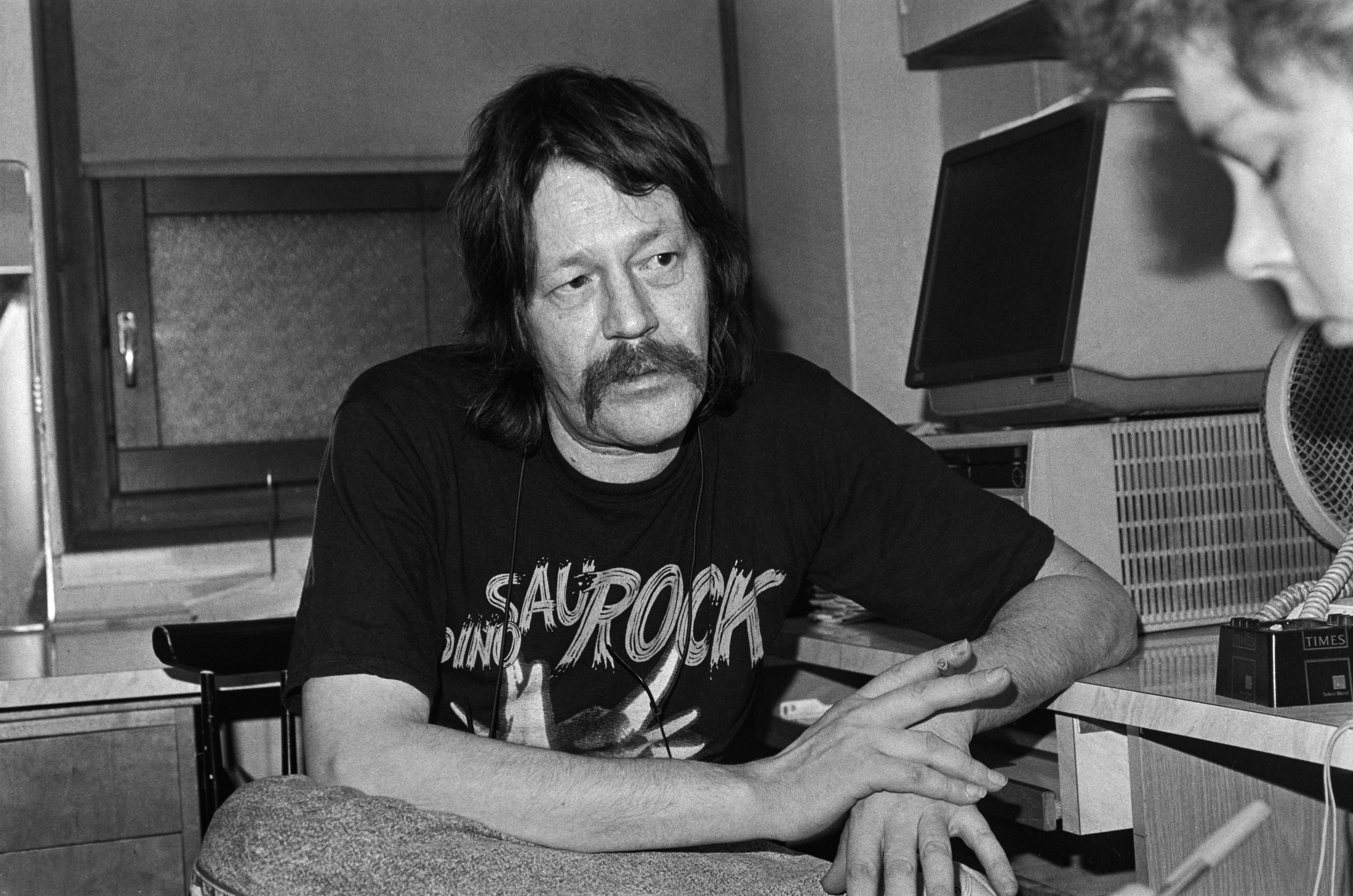
- Irwin Goodman in 1990.

Background information
- Also known as: Irwin Goodman; Rock-Williams; William White; Andy; Rudolf Holtz (Note: "Rudolf Holtz" was a collective pseudonym of Goodman and Finnish composer and music arranger Paul Fagerlund with whom Goodman worked.); Hamppari; Bob Mersey; Bill Black
- Born: Antti Yrjö Hammarberg; 14 September 1943; Hämeenlinna, Finland
- Origin: Hämeenlinna, Finland
- Died: 14 January 1991 (aged 47) Hamina, Finland
- Genres: Rock folk blues
- Occupation: Singer-songwriter
- Instruments: Vocals guitar harmonica
- Years active: 1962–1991
- Label: Finnlevy
- Website: www.irwingoodman.com

Antti Yrjö Hammarberg (14 September 1943 – 14 January 1991), professionally known as Irwin Goodman, was a Finnish rock and folk singer. He started as a protest song singer in the folk boom of the mid-1960s; his humorous songs, often mocking the authorities, became favorites of the Finnish people; Goodman singalike contests are still held by some pubs for entertainment.

Goodman's songs include "Poing poing poing" (1971), "Haistakaa paska koko valtiovalta" (1976), "Rentun ruusu" (1988), "Ei tippa tapa" (1966), "Työmiehen lauantai" (1965), "En kerro kuinka jouduin naimisiin" (1965) and "Tyttö tuli" (1978).

== Life and career ==
Born in Hämeenlinna, Goodman lived in Stuttgart, West Germany, in the early 1960s. In the late 1960s, he was widely known as a protest singer. He recorded over 300 songs, most of which were his own compositions, with lyrics written by Vexi Salmi. He won the Syksyn sävel song contest twice.

Common themes in his songs were poverty, taxes, drinking and alcoholism ("Ei tippa tapa", "Vielä yhdet", "Kieltolaki", "Homma käy", "Työmiehen lauantai", "Rentun ruusu" – approximate English translations: "One drop won't kill you", "I'll have another one", "Prohibition", "It's OK", "The workman's Saturday", "The poor man's rose") and problems with money ("Raha ratkaisee", "Kun ei rahat riitä", "Meni rahahommat pieleen", "Manu vippaa muutama markka" – approximate English translations: "Money is the solution", "When you don't have enough money", "I failed the money job", "Manu, lend me a couple of markkas"). He protested the government with songs like "Juhlavalssi" ("Celebration waltz"), and "Haistakaa paska koko valtiovalta" ("The whole government can go fuck themselves").

In 1971, Goodman released an album featuring the actor Esa Pakarinen. His 1972 album Kohta taas on joulu consists of Christmas carols. The later songs ("Suruton nuoruusaika", "Maailma on kaunis", "Ai, ai, ai, kun nuori ois" and "Viimeinen laulu" – approximate English translations: "Youth without sorrow", "The world is beautiful", "Oh, oh, oh, when you're young", "The final song") were often darker in theme than the songs of the 1960s and 1970s.

Goodman had continuing troubles with Finnish tax authorities and had ever-worsening problems with alcohol. His escapades were eagerly followed by sensationalist magazines such as Hymy. Goodman died of a heart attack while on the way from Vyborg, Soviet Union, to Hamina, Finland. The story of his life was turned into a feature film, Rentun ruusu, in 2001.

== Discography ==
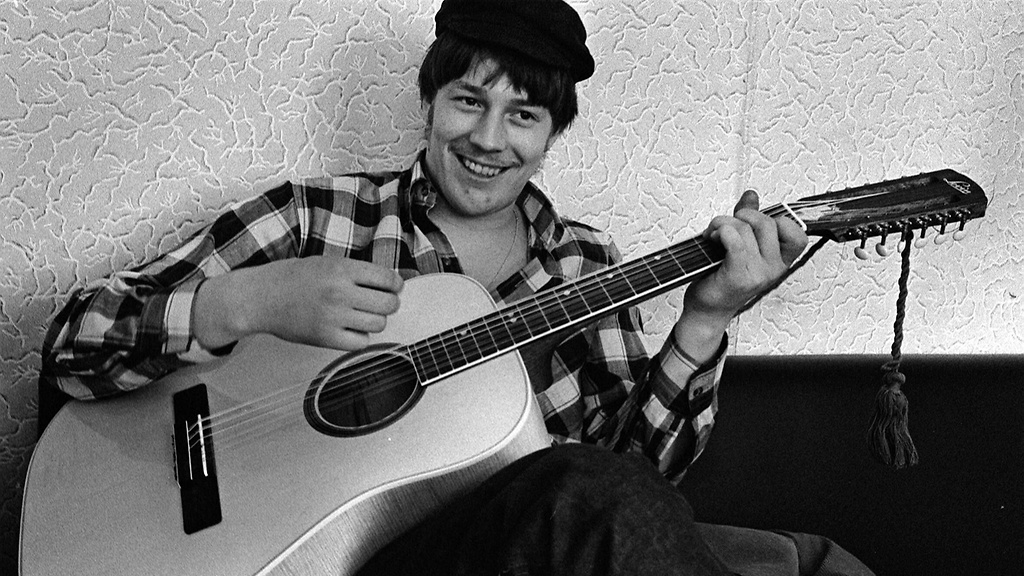
Irwin Goodman in 1966

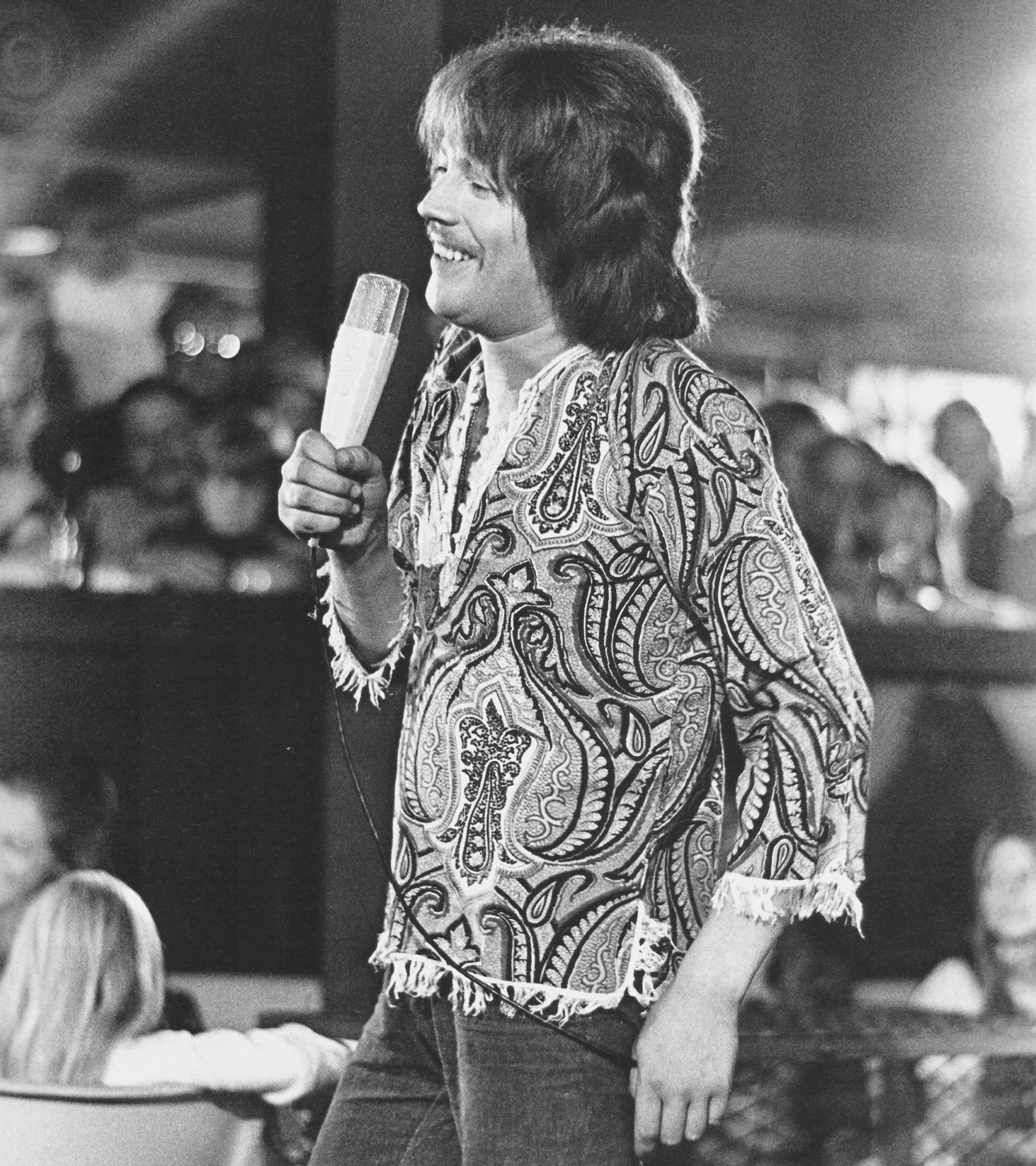
Irwin Goodman in 1971

=== Albums ===
- Irwinismi (1966)
- Ei tippa tapa (1966)
- Osta minut (1967)
- Reteesti vaan (1968)
- Irwin Goodman (1969)
- Työmiehen lauantai (1970)
- St. Pauli ja Reeperbahn (1970)
- Lonkalta (1971, feat. Esa Pakarinen)
- Poing, poing, poing (1971)
- Kohta taas on joulu (1972)
- Las Palmas (1972)
- Si si si (1973)
- Häirikkö (1976)
- Kolmastoista kerta (1977)
- Cha cha cha (1977)
- Inkkareita ja länkkäreitä (1977)
- Tyttö tuli (1978)
- Kulkurin kulta (1979, feat. Hanne)
- Keisari Irwin I (1979)
- Härmäläinen perusjuntti (1984)
- Dirly dirly dee (1985)
- Rentun ruusu (1988)
- Vuosikerta -89 (1989)
- Hurraa – Me teemme laivoja (1990)
- Ai ai ai kun nuori ois (1990)

== See also ==
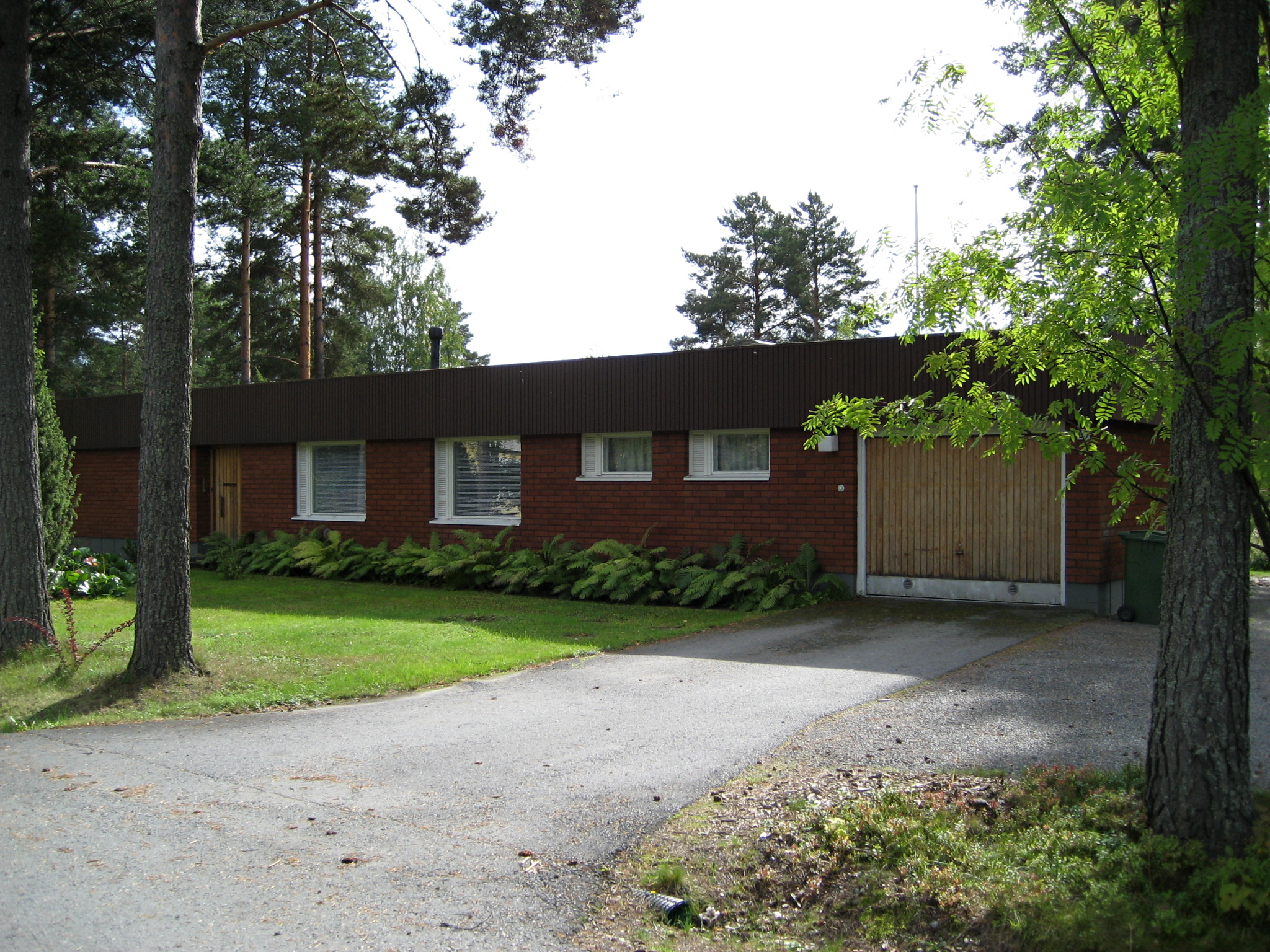
This red brick walled house, nicknamed "Ryysyranta" according to a well-known book by Ilmari Kianto, belonged to Irwin Goodman. It is located in Parola, Hattula, Finland. Built in 1969, it was auctioned the following year due to the artist's unpaid debts and taxes by KOP Bank. A place of pilgrimage for some die-hard fans, today it is a private house and in residential use and should be treated as such.

- Goodman, a shopping centre in Hämeenlinna named after Goodman
- List of best-selling music artists in Finland
