= Cinema of Finland =

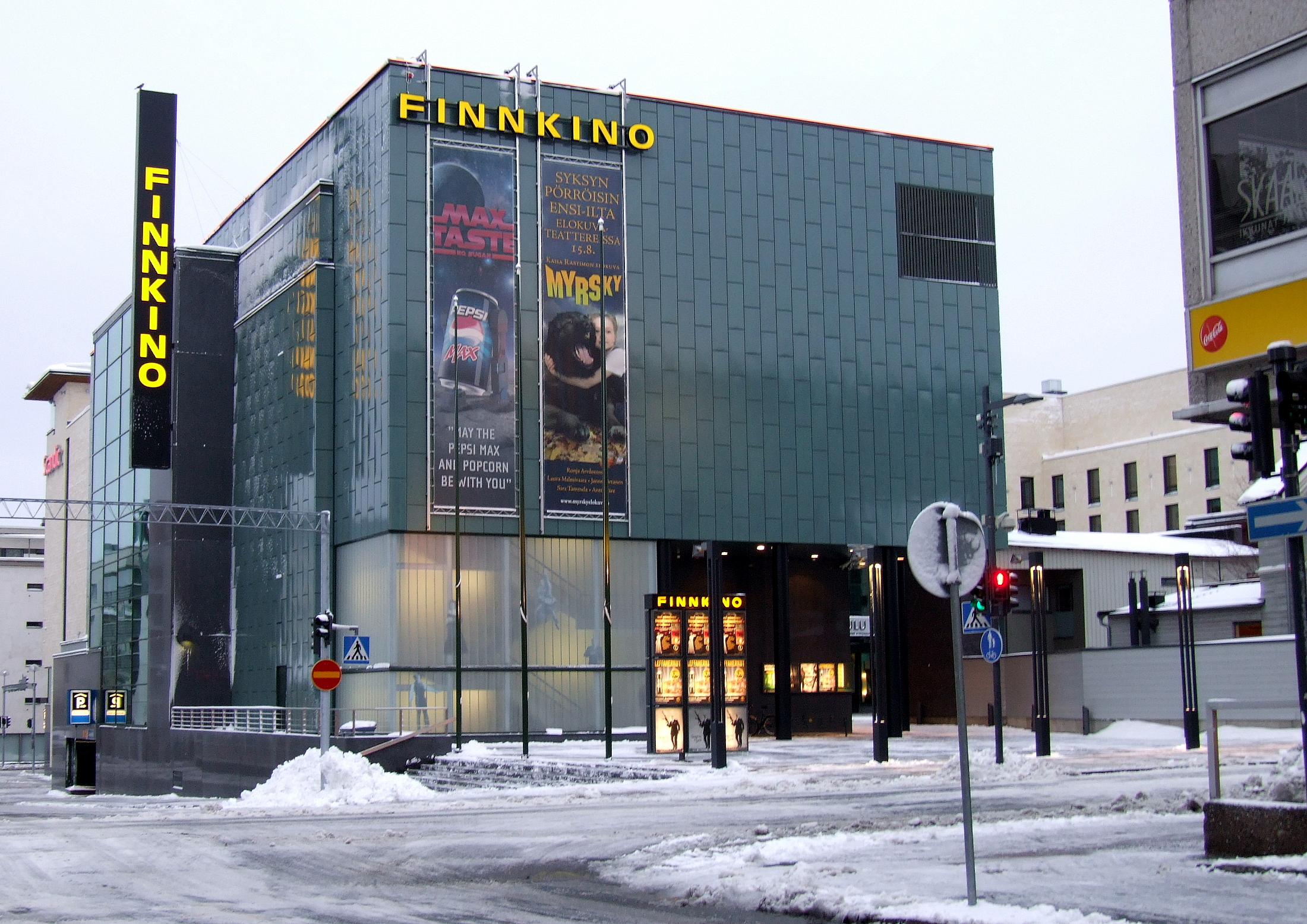
- Finnkino Plaza, a multiplex movie theater in Oulu
- No. of screens: 383 (2025)
  - Per capita: 6.72 per 100,000 (2025)
- Main distributors: Finnkino (29%); Nordisk Film Finland (18%) SF Studios (15%); The Walt Disney Company Nordic (13%); Others (24%)

Produced feature films (2025)
- Total: 44

Number of admissions (2025)
- Total: 6,300,000
  - Per capita: 1.10 (2025)
- National films: 2,000,000 (32%)

Gross box office (2025)
- Total: €85.8 million

The Finnish cinema has a long history, with the first public screenings starting almost as early as modern motion picture technology was invented (the first screening in the world was in 1895, and in Finland in 1896). It took over a decade before the first Finnish film was produced and screened in 1907. After these first steps of Finnish cinema, the progress was very slow. After 1907 there were two periods (1909–1911 and 1917–1918) when no Finnish films were produced. This was partly caused by the political situation, as Finland held a status as an autonomous part of the Russian Empire and was thus influenced by the worldwide political situation.

In 1917 Finland became an independent country and in 1918 there was a civil war. After the political situation had stabilized, Finnish society and its cultural life began to develop. This was very clear with cinematic arts. More films were produced and they became an important part of Finnish society. The culmination of this development came soon after the silent era, around the 1940s and 1950s, when three major studios were producing films and competing for the market. When society changed in the 1960s, partly because of political trends and partly because of new forms of entertainment, like television, the appeal of films was threatened, practically all studios were closed, and films became political and too artistic for the masses, as commercial production was considered a thing of the past and distasteful. However, a few filmmakers were opposed to this development, and kept producing popular films that were bashed by the critics but loved by the people.

The most significant Finnish films include The Unknown Soldier, directed by Edvin Laine in 1955, which is shown on television every Independence Day. Here, Beneath the North Star from 1968, also directed by Laine, which includes the Finnish Civil War from the perspective of the Red Guards, is also one of the most significant works in Finnish cinematic history. A 1960 crime comedy film Inspector Palmu's Mistake, directed by Matti Kassila, was voted in 2012 the best Finnish film of all time by Finnish film critics and journalists.

A revival in Finnish cinema came in the 1990s, which was partly influenced by the new generation of filmmakers bringing in new ideas, and partly because commercial success was no longer considered to be "non-artistic," thus commercial film projects started to receive support from governmental funds. In the 2000s the Finnish cinema is alive and well, with some films and filmmakers gaining global success and many films receiving a good response from audiences and critics. Today, around 15–20 Finnish full-length feature films are produced every year, and the Finnish cinema is gaining new forms from global influence, such as action and wuxia. The 2022 action war film Sisu, directed by Jalmari Helander, is currently the most successful Finnish film of all time in the United States at the box office, with revenues of over $7 million.

== History ==
=== 1896–1920: Before Independence ===
The Lumière company screened the first moving images at Helsinki in 1896, but it wasn't until 1904 that the first films were actually filmed in Finland. It is unknown who made the first film (called Novelty from Helsinki: School youth at break), but it was shown by American Bioscope in December. The first Finnish film company, Atelier Apollo, was founded in 1906 by engineer K. E. Ståhlberg. It produced mainly documentary shorts, but also the first Finnish feature film, The Moonshiners (1907). From the very beginning, Finnish film production was centered to the country's capital, although for few years starting from 1907 there was a noteworthy company Oy Maat ja Kansat producing short documentaries in Tampere.

The Moonshiners was directed by Teuvo Puro, who was also in charge of directing the first full-length Finnish feature, Sylvi, based on a play by Minna Canth. The film was shot in 1911 with two other full-length literature adaptations, but it didn't premiere until 1913. The filmmakers didn't have enough money to send films to the nearest laboratory in Copenhagen at once, so the material remained undeveloped too long, and two out of three films were ruined.

The years following Sylvi saw the formation of the first active feature film company, Hjalmar V. Pohjanheimo's Lyyra-Filmi, which produced both short farces and "art films". There was also an attempt to create larger-scale film production by Erik Estlander, who build a studio with glass walls and roof in Helsinki in 1916. At the end of the same year the Russian officials forbid all filming activity in Finland, so nothing much was made anymore before the country's independence in 1917.

The Finnish film industry of the first two decades of the 20th century was never even near the creativity or the productiveness of its Scandinavian neighbours, Sweden and Denmark – one might even say that it there was barely no industry or production at all. In addition, most of the footage filmed before independence is lost. Of feature films, only thirteen minutes of Sylvi still remains.

=== 1920–1930: The Silent Years ===
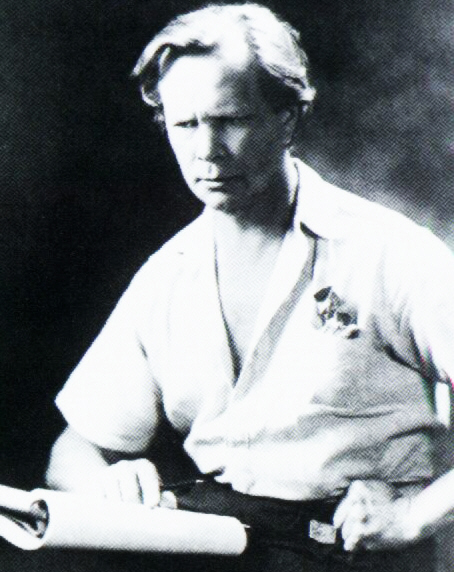
Erkki Karu, founder of Suomi-Filmi and Suomen Filmiteollisuus

==== Suomi-Filmi ====
It wasn't until the 1920s before regular film production started, thanks to a successful company called Suomi-Filmi (founded under the name Suomen Filmikuvaamo in 1919) and its creative leader Erkki Karu. He also directed the most important films of the era and was the prime figure of Finnish cinema before his early death in 1935. His The Village Shoemakers (1923) is the essential silent masterpiece, a freshly told folk comedy after Aleksis Kivi's play with mildly experimental camerawork by German Kurt Jäger. Other notable films by Karu include: The Logroller's Bride (1923), with superb cinematography by Jäger and Oscar Lindelöf, and also the first Finnish film distributed widely abroad; When Father Has Toothache (1923), a short and surrealistic farce; and Our Boys (1929), a patriotisic forerunner of many military farces.

Audiences of the agricultural country were affected by Suomi-Filmi's rural subjects. Dealing with deeply national countryside stories remained as company's policy through the silent era. Occasionally there were some attempts to make more urban, or more "European" films like Karu's Summery Fairytale (1925), but the public stayed away.

Another important director at Suomi-Filmi was the aforementioned Puro, who made the company's first feature Olli's Years of Apprenticeship(1920) and one of the few Finnish horror films, Evil Spells (1927). An interesting oddity of the last two silent years was Carl von Haartman, a soldier and an adventurer, who had worked as a military advisor in Hollywood. Because of this he was considered capable of directing films. His two upper-class spy dramas, The Supreme Victory (1929) and Mirage (1930), were quite passable, but didn't attract the public.

==== Other companies ====
Suomi-Filmi heavily dominated the Finnish film production in the 1920s. The company produced 23 out of 37 full-length feature films made between 1919–1930. Other companies (that appeared occasionally) seemed to vanish from Suomi-Filmi's and Erkki Karu's way after producing one or two films. The most important of these alternative production companies appeared during the latter half of the decade.

The German cinematographer Jäger left Suomi-Filmi, and formed his own company Komedia-Filmi. It linked with a global film trust (Ufanamet), which at the time possessed most of the film distribution of Finland, thus being a great threat to Suomi-Filmi. Suomi-Filmi defended itself with national values, accusing Komedia-Filmi and Ufanamet for being foreign invaders. Luckily for Suomi-Filmi, both companies proved to be unsuccessful. Komedia-Filmi only made two films, of which the latter one, On the Highway of Life (1927, directed by Jäger and Ragnar Hartwall) is an interesting attempt to make some kind of a modern comedy.

In 1929 the minor production company Fennica released its first two films, both directed by Valentin Vaala, who later become one of the prominent directors of the Golden Age of Finnish cinema. Vaala was 17 years old when production started on the first film, Dark Eyes, while its leading actor Theodor Tugai (later known as Teuvo Tulio) was 14. Dark Eyes and it remake The Gypsy Charmer were melodramtic films incorporating elements of orientalist style and themes. Dark Eyes in now considered a lost film. According to accounts of its production, the filmmakers destroyed the film's sole surviving negative by throwing it into the sea, because they considered the remake superior.

There were also enterprises to produce films outside the capital, but the films made in Viipuri and Oulu were too primitive to even premiere at Helsinki. No Tears at the Fair (1927) and The Man of Snowbound Forests (1928), two now lost films produced in Tampere by Aquila-Suomi and directed by Uuno Eskola were better attempts according to their contemporaries. Nothing permanent production was left in Tampere, but one of Aquila's producers, painter Kalle Kaarna, proved to be a gifted director in his own right. His first film With the Blade of a Sword (1928) was boldly advertised as a neutral story about the painful civil war of 1918, and his second film, A Song about the Heroism of Labour (1929) introduced (although quite conventionally) a new kind of proletarian hero to the public. Neither of these films have survived to today.

=== 1931–1933: The Coming of Sound ===
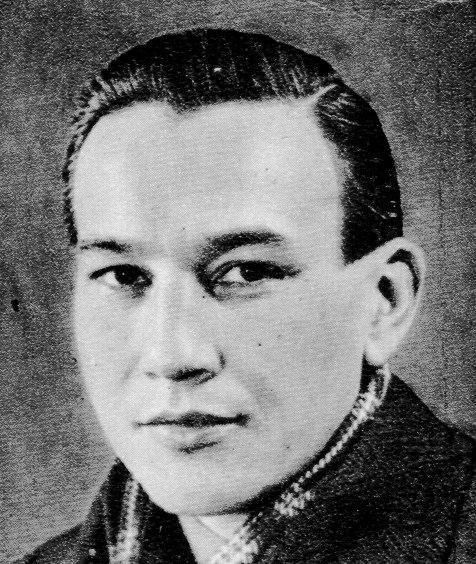
Teuvo Tulio, a Finnish film director in the 1930s.

The first experiments with sound were done by Lahyn-Filmi, a provincial company operating in Turku. The first full-length sound film with song and talk was Lahyn's Say It in Finnish (1931), directed by company's leader Yrjö Nyberg (later Norta). This lost film was more a collection of musical revue numbers than a feature.

Suomi-Filmi transformed its production from silent to sound films during the same year. The first Finnish film with soundtrack was the company's Dressed Like Adam and a Bit Like Eve Too (1931), based on a popular play by Agapetus (pseudonym of Yrjö Soini). There was only music and some sound effects on the soundtrack, so the company's first true sound film was Karu's The Lumberjack's Bride (1931), another rural drama.

=== 1934–1939: The Golden Age ===
==== The studio system ====
In 1933, Karu was ousted from Suomi-Filmi. He retaliated by founding a new film studio, called Suomen Filmiteollisuus, which started to use the initials SF in its logo. This company saw greater success than previous competitors of Suomi-Filmi, and following several successful comedies directed by Karu, it had grown to be as significant as its rival.

The competition between the two companies proved to be beneficial for the growth of the industry. By the end of the decade, there were approximately twenty full-length features being made every year. As the quality of productions increased and the field of subjects expanded, so did the popularity of domestic films. With its own stars and producers, the Finnish film industry began to resemble a national miniature of Hollywood. The two major studios saw major successes in this period, as did some smaller production companies.

Sound had increased the public's eagerness to see domestic films. The great breakthrough for Finnish talkies came with The Foreman of Siltala Farm (1934), a well-recorded comedy by Suomi-Filmi, that was seen by over 900 000 viewers.

==== Suomi-Filmi ====
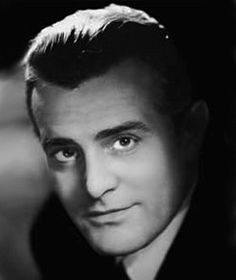
Tauno Palo was one of the most famous Finnish film stars

Erkki Karu was instantly replaced with Risto Orko as the head of company, a place he held until the 1990s (although this was long after the company had stopped movie-making). Orko had directed The Foreman of Siltala Farm, and he returned to directing a few times since, most notably with two historical and patriotic dramas at the end of the decade: Soldier's Bride (1938) and Activists (1939). Most of his films as a director remain forgettable.

The most important director at Suomi-Filmi was Valentin Vaala, who had a stunningly creative period at the end of the 1930s. After the silent years, Vaala had directed three more films for his first company Fennica. When he started the fourth, the company went broke. Now he moved to Suomi-Filmi, and although his first movie there (Everybody's Love, 1935) was quite a modest comedy, it was very popular, and most importantly, introduced two of the most beloved Finnish stars to the public: Ansa Ikonen and Tauno Palo.

Vaala's last Fennica-films had been urban comedies, a genre which he greatly developed at his new studio with his next two light-weighted films, Substitute Wife and Substitute Husband (both 1936). Hulda of Juurakko (1937) was far more serious attempt in the same field: a socially conscious story about a country girl who arrives to the big city, and who inevitably faces the problems of inequality between sexes. The film and its subject were greeted with huge enthusiasm by the audiences.

Vaala was also a master within the rural subjects and romantic melodramas. In 1938 he made the first and best film in the series of agrarian family saga of Niskavuori (Women of Niskavuori).

==== SF ====
Suomen Filmiteollisuus

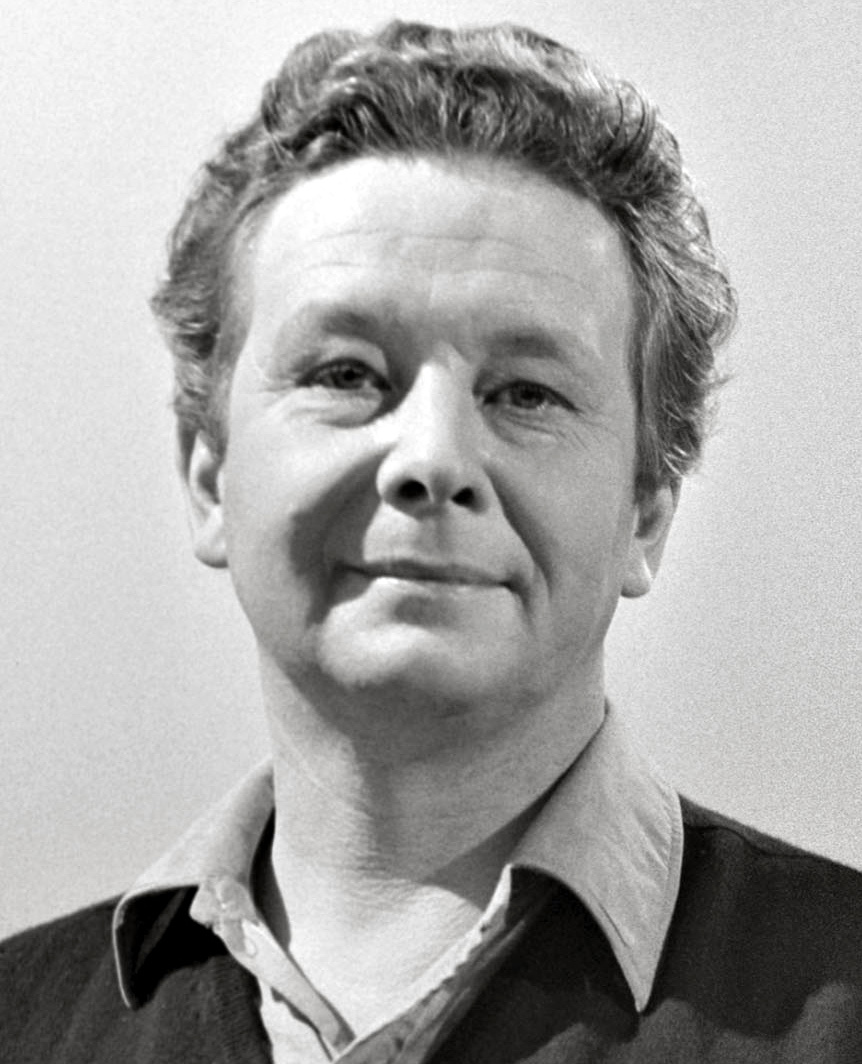
Lasse Pöysti had a varied and long career

After his early death in 1935, Karu was replaced by Toivo Särkkä in the head of the company. Särkkä led SF until its bankruptcy in 1965. Särkkä was the most prolific producer and director that Finnish film has ever seen: he has way over 200 feature productions in his filmography, of which he directed 51. With Yrjö Norta, he directed most of the company's films in the 1930s, including religious drama As Dream and Shadow... (1937) and patriotic historical film Manifest in February (1939). Särkkä's and Norta's output includes some highly popular folk comedies like Lapatossu (1937) – with beloved comedy actor Aku Korhonen – ,The Regiment's Trouble Boy (1938), the model of Finnish military farce genre, and The SF Parade (1940), the first proper Finnish musical comedy. Särkkä also directed Finland's first feature-length color film, which was the 1956 drama film Juha.

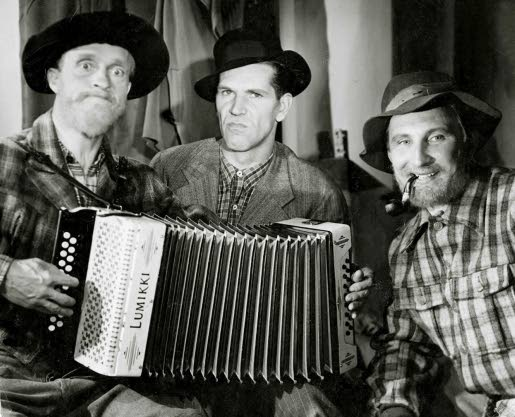
Esa Pakarinen, Reino Helismaa and Jorma Ikävalko appearing in the first "Rillumarei film", a 1951 comedy film Rovaniemen markkinoilla.

Many Finnish films of the 1940s and 1950s – especially during Särkkä's era – were largely characterized by certain plot structures and themes, such as glorification related to the countrysides, emphasizing virtuous morality, and the superficiality of film's dialogue. Also, the so-called "Rillumarei films", a comedic song or couplet types films, began to become more widespread, including the Pekka Puupää films starring Esa Pakarinen and Masa Niemi. The "Rillumarei films", full of the pride of workers' and carefree guys, were loved by the audience, although they were very hated by critics.

==== Other companies ====
Along with Suomi-Filmi and SF, few minor companies were able to produce many films during the golden age. With Valentin Vaala's films, these local "poverty row" productions are the most fascinating films made during the 1930s.

=== The New Wave from 1960 to 1980 ===
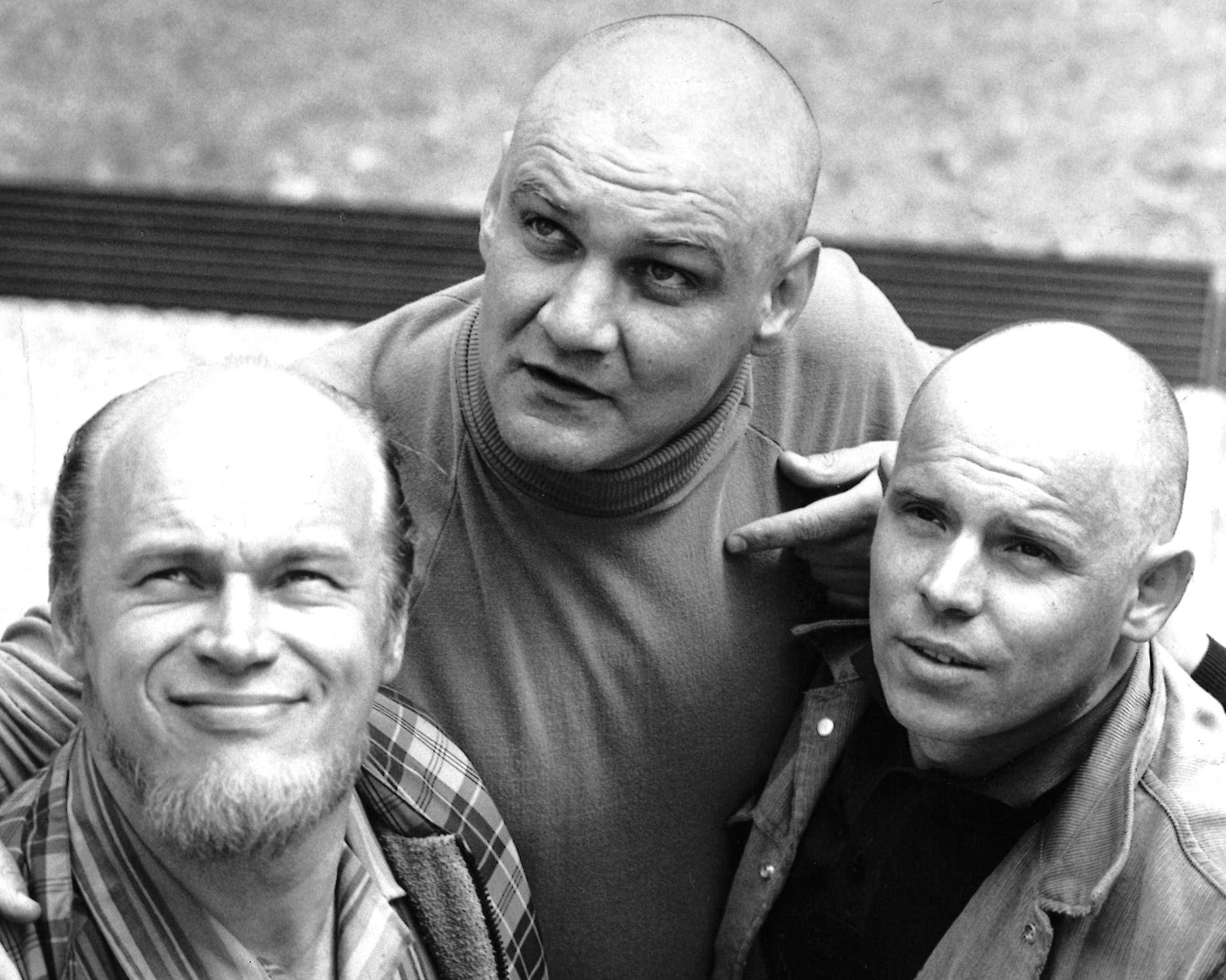
Spede Pasanen, Jukka Virtanen and Ere Kokkonen

A new generation of film-makers were eager to take over as the old production companies, such as Suomi-Filmi and SF, were collapsing. Risto Jarva was inspired by the French avant-garde and new wave, which developed to social realism seen in Työmiehen päiväkirja (1967), and eventually to comedies Loma (1976) and Jäniksen vuosi (1977). Mikko Niskanen began his career back in 1962 with Pojat, starring then unknown Vesa-Matti Loiri. Niskanen joined the new wave with Käpy selän alla (1966) and Lapualaismorsian (1967). The 1960s also marked the rise of new style of Finnish comedy films under Pertti Pasanen, such as X-Paroni, About Seven Brothers and Näköradiomiehen Ihmeelliset Siekailut. Rauni Mollberg adapted two of Timo K. Mukka's magically realistic Lapland novels to the big screen: The Earth Is a Sinful Song (1973) and Milka (1983).

Comedy Millipilleri (1966) by Ere Kokkonen and Spede Pasanen was one of the most watched Finnish films. The duo would go on to direct many more popular films in the following decades, including box-office hit Uuno Turhapuro (1973) starring Vesa-Matti Loiri, which would spawn a franchise with 19 films in total. Despite film critics not always being appreciative of their work, the popularity of the films by Kokkonen and Pasanen was undeniable and long lasting.

However, the 1970s also brought with it Finnish films that were not very successful financially, of which the year 1974 was one of the rock bottoms in Finnish film history. In that year, appeared an erotic thriller film The Hair, directed by Seppo Huunonen, which was largely despised by critics and also been considered "one of the worst Finnish films ever made".

=== Kaurismäki Era of the 1980s ===
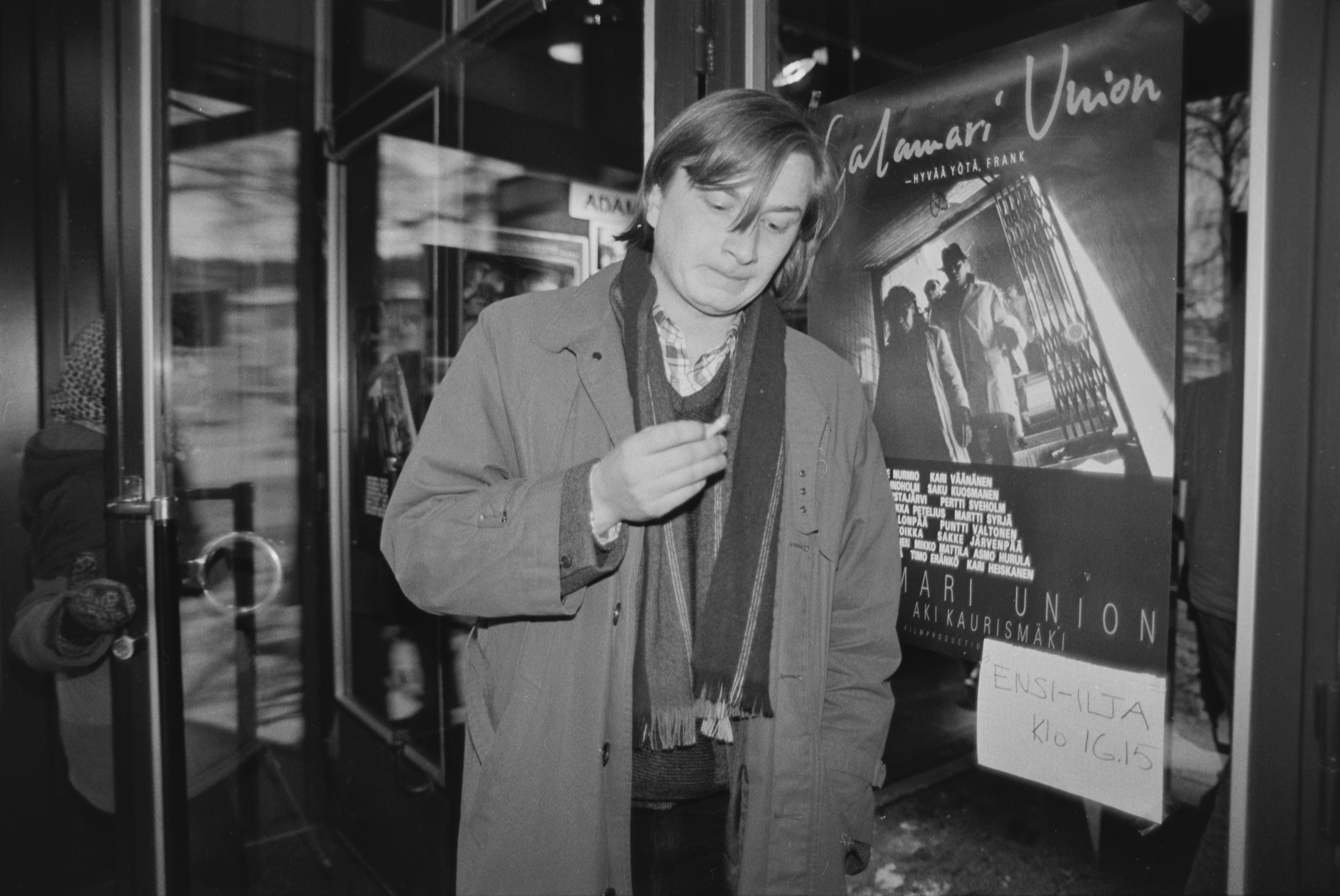
Aki Kaurismäki in 1985

The old guard of the previous film-making generation was symbolically thrown from the throne in the beginning of 1980 by a Finnish-Soviet co-production, Borrowing Matchsticks, followed by Tapio Suominen's Täältä tullaan, elämä!. Edvin Laine and Mikko Niskanen made their last movies, and the decade saw nearly 30 directorial debuts, including movies from Mika & Aki Kaurismäki, Markku Lehmuskallio, Pirjo Honkasalo, Taavi Kassila, Janne Kuusi, Matti Kuortti, Matti Ijäs, Olli Soinio, Lauri Törhönen, Claes Olsson, Veikko Aaltonen, and Pekka Parikka.

The Liar (1981) and The Worthless (1982), directed by Mika and written by Aki Kaurismäki, broke the status quo in Finnish film industry by bringing back creativity and small scale production. Mika went to pursue a more traditional way of film making in his career with Klaani (1984), Rosso (1985), and Helsinki Napoli All Night Long (1987). Aki has taken less deviations in style and theme, and his films are known for minimalistic non-verbal communication and dead-pan delivery of dialogs. While Aki is best known for the Suomi-trilogy Kauas pilvet karkaavat (1996), Mies vailla menneisyyttä (2002), and Laitakaupungin valot (2006), his work also includes comedy such as Leningrad Cowboys Go America (1989).

=== 1990-2000 ===
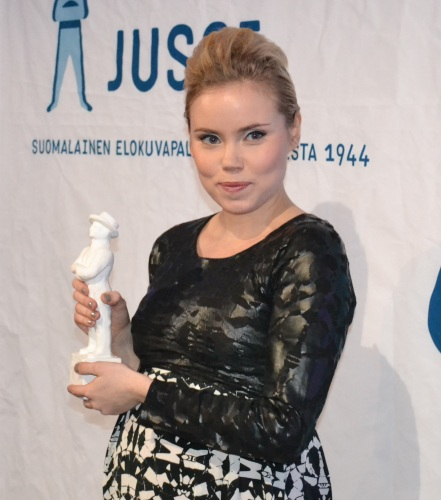
Sara Melleri, a Finnish actress.

The beginning of the 1990s did not look too good to the film industry, because the national economy was on a strong decline. Film financing was not a priority to the government-backed Finnish Film Foundation, which is responsible for the majority of movie financing in Finland. Fortunately the situation would flip completely upside down by 1999, when nearly 30 domestic movies premiered. Poika ja ilves, Häjyt, and Kulkuri ja joutsen enjoyed over 200 000 viewers each, and helped to bring the popularity of domestic movies back to where it was a decade earlier.

Prolific directors introduced in the 1990s include Markku Pölönen, Auli Mantila, and Jarmo Lampela. A few popular genres can be identified from the last two decades. Rukajärven tie, Pikkusisar, and Hylätyt talot, autiot pihat take place during World War II.

=== 2001-present ===
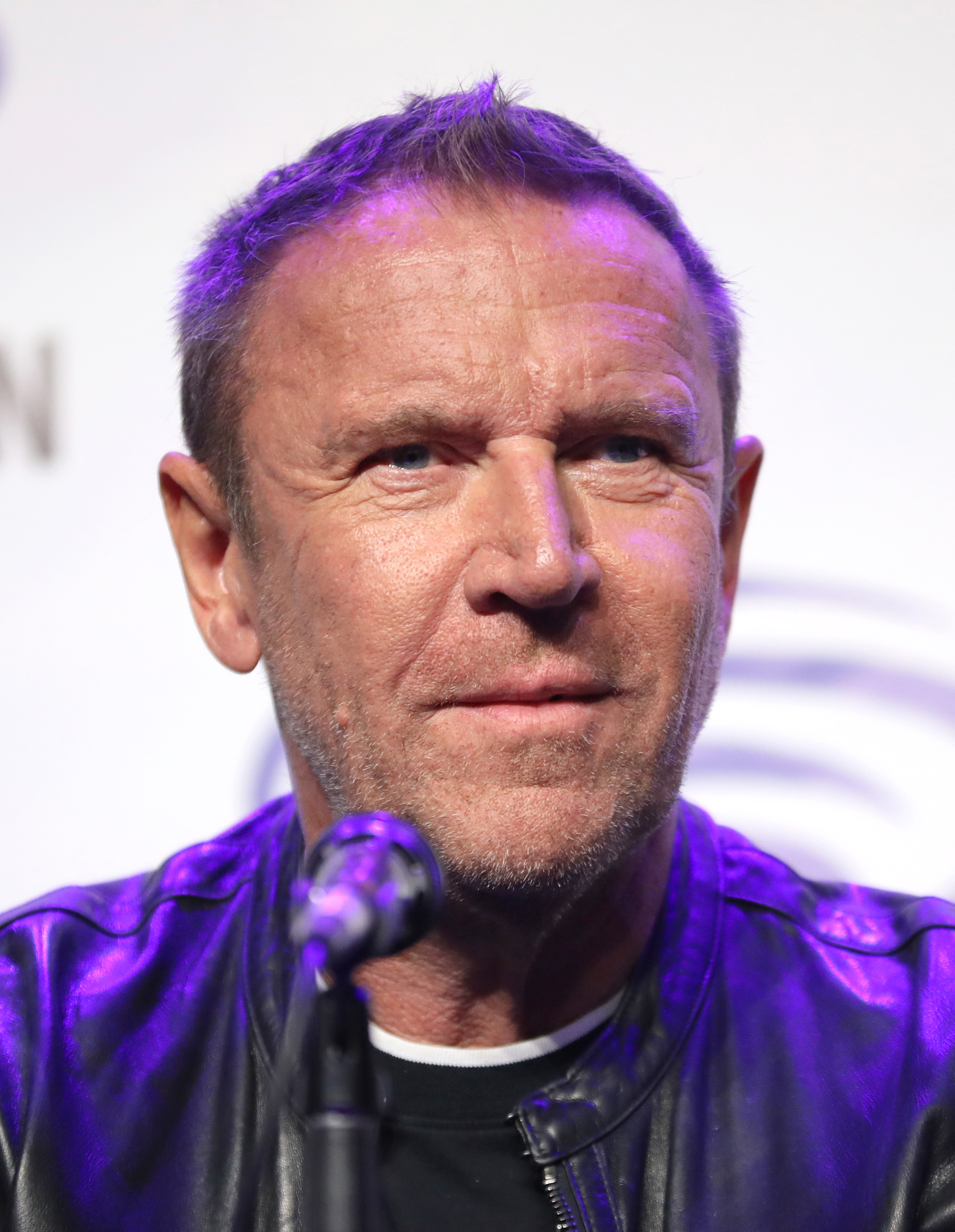
Renny Harlin

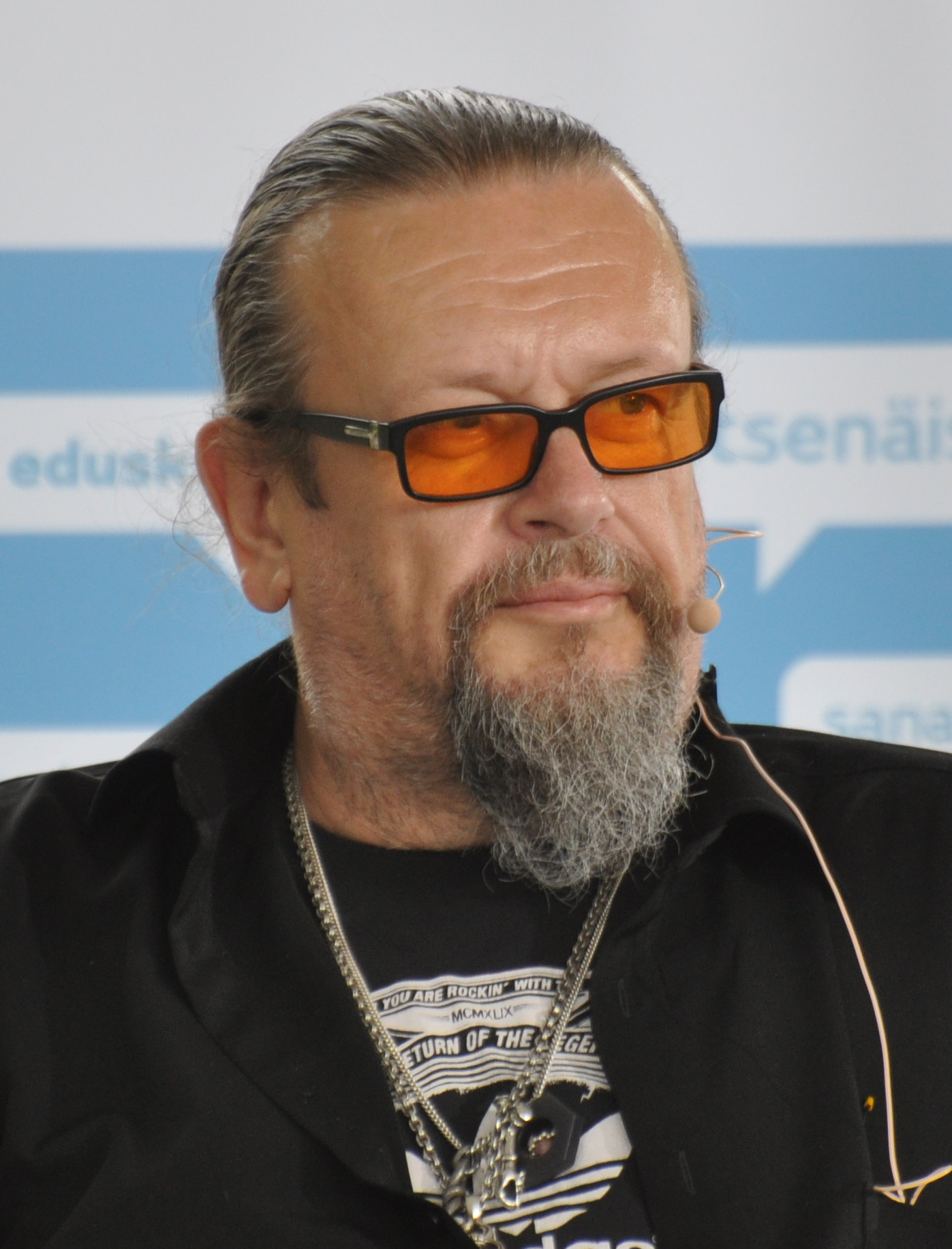
Markus Selin

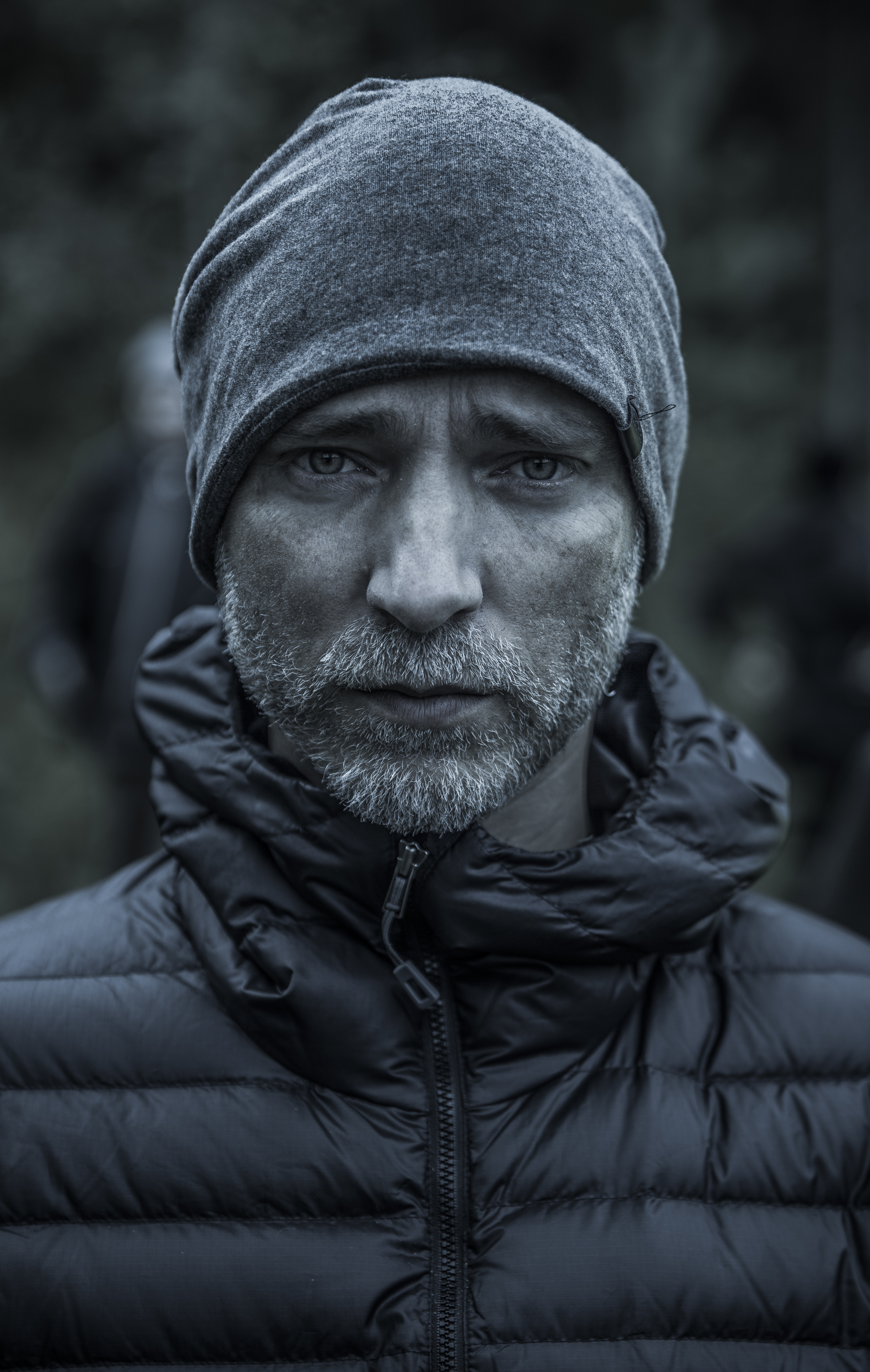
Aku Louhimies

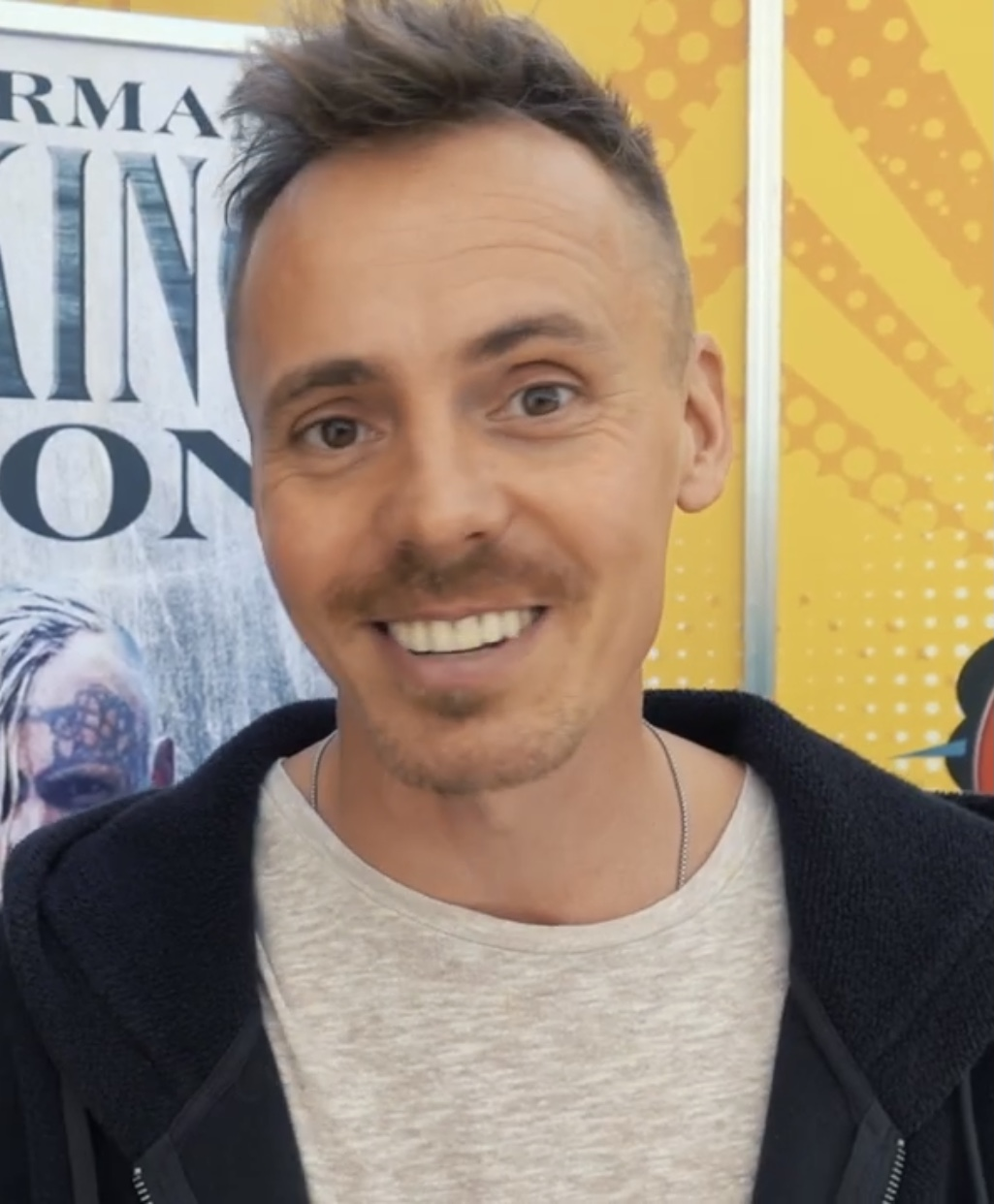
Jasper Pääkkönen

In the beginning of 21st century, Kulkuri ja joutsen (1999), Badding (2000), Rentun Ruusu (2001), Sibelius (2003), and Aleksis Kiven elämä (2002) portray the life of popular public figures in Finland.

The Man Without a Past by auteur filmmaker Aki Kaurismäki won the Grand Prix at the 2002 Cannes Film Festival. His next film, the third part in the "Finland" trilogy, Lights in the Dusk, was also presented at the Cannes Film Festival.

2005 saw the release of amateur science fiction parody film Star Wreck: In the Pirkinning, which was released online as a free download. The film has been downloaded over 9 million times and is internationally the most viewed Finnish film.

The same year Frozen Land was released in movie theaters. It was directed and written by Aku Louhimies. The film's plot is based on Leo Tolstoy's 1911 posthumously published story "The Forged Coupon", part one. It was a box office success and won eight Jussi Awards.

In 2011, Finland produced 31 films, 24 of which were full-length features and the other seven were documentaries.

In 2016, the three most watched films in Finland were all Finnish family films: Risto Räppääjä ja yöhaukka (English: Ricky Rapper and The Nighthawk) (2016), The Angry Birds Movie (2016), and Kanelia kainaloon, Tatu ja Patu! (2016).

War drama The Unknown Soldier (2017) is one of the most expensive Finnish films ever made. It is the third adaptation of the 1954 bestselling Finnish classic novel of the same name.

Experimental film M (2018) by Anna Eriksson which detailed the last days of film legend Marilyn Monroe, was screened at the Venice International Film Critics' Week section at the 75th Venice Film Festival.

Produced on a budget of 17 million euros, Iron Sky: The Coming Race (2019) is the most expensive Finnish live-action picture ever made. However, the sequel to the 2012 film Iron Sky failed to live up to expectations and was a box-office bomb.

Dogs Don't Wear Pants starring Krista Kosonen was screened at the Director's Fortnight section at the 2019 Cannes Film Festival.

Black comedy about a disabled man, The Blind Man Who Did Not Want to See Titanic, received an audience award at the 2021 Venice Film Festival.

Finnish-Russian co-production Compartment No. 6 won the Grand Prix at the 2021 Cannes Film Festival. Another notable Finnish-Russian film, dystopia Quarantine by film director and musician Diana Ringo, was released the same year.

Dystopia film W (2022) by Anna Eriksson was selected for the 2022 Locarno Film Festival. Other Finnish films which were selected for the festival were documentary Ruthless Times – Songs of Care by Susanna Helke and Sihja, the Rebel Fairy by Marja Pyykkö. The period between 2022–2023 has been a significant period for Finnish cinema in terms of achieving new international breakthroughs, as the horror film Hatching, directed by Hanna Bergholm, and the action film Sisu, directed by Jalmari Helander, have received enormous praise around the world.

Internationally known Finnish actors and actresses include Jasper Pääkkönen, Peter Franzén, Laura Birn, Irina Björklund, Samuli Edelmann, Krista Kosonen, Kati Outinen, Ville Virtanen, Martti Suosalo and Joonas Suotamo.

== See also ==
Awards

- Jussi Awards

Festivals

- Helsinki International Film Festival

Institutions/Organizations

- Finnish Film Foundation

Lists

- List of Finnish actors
- List of Finnish film directors
- List of most expensive Finnish films
- List of Nordic Academy Award winners and nominees
- Lists of Finnish films
