= List of Finnish film directors =

The following is a list of Finnish film directors and producers.

== A ==
- Veikko Aaltonen (born 1955)
- Heikki Aho (1895–1961)
- Antero Alli (1952–2023)
- Ritva Arvelo (1921–2013)
- Khadar Ayderus Ahmed (born 1981)

== B ==
- Peter von Bagh (1943–2014)
- Eija-Elina Bergholm (born 1943)
- Zaida Bergroth (born 1977)
- Hassan Blasim (born 1973)
- Erik Blomberg (1913–1996)

== D ==
- Jörn Donner (1933–2020)

== E ==
- Esko Elstelä (1931–2007)
- Anna Eriksson (born 1977)

== F ==
- Pauliina Feodoroff
- Kyllikki Forssell (1925–2019)
- Vivi Friedman (1967–2012)

== G ==
- Juhan af Grann (1944–2023)

== H ==
- Simo Halinen
- Alli Haapasalo (born 1977)
- Carl von Haartman (1897–1980)
- Roland af Hällström (1905–1956)
- Arto Halonen (born 1964)
- Jari Halonen (born 1962)
- Renny Harlin (born 1959)
- Klaus Härö (born 1971)
- Jalmari Helander (born 1976)
- Hanna Hemilä (born 1960)
- Pirjo Honkasalo (born 1947)
- Laura Hyppönen

== I ==
- Misko Iho (born 1975)
- Ansa Ikonen (1913–1989)
- Matti Ijäs (born 1950)

== J ==
- Kira Jääskeläinen
- Tero Jartti (born 1962)
- Risto Jarva (1934–1977)
- Ilkka Järvi-Laturi (1961–2023)
- Antti Jokinen (born 1968)
- Kaija Juurikkala (born 1959)

== K ==
- Pekka Karjalainen
- Erkki Karu (1887–1935)
- Dome Karukoski (born 1976)
- Matti Kassila (1924–2018)
- Aki Kaurismäki (born 1957)
- Mika Kaurismäki (born 1955)
- Erkko Kivikoski (1936–2005)
- Timo Koivusalo (born 1963)
- Ere Kokkonen (1938–2008)
- Petri Kotwica (born 1964)
- Alexis Kouros
- Juho Kuosmanen (born 1979)
- Maunu Kurkvaara (1926–2023)

== L ==
- Edvin Laine (1905–1989)
- Katariina Lahti (born 1949)
- Maarit Lalli (born 1964)
- Jarmo Lampela (born 1964)
- Markku Lehmuskallio (born 1938)
- PV Lehtinen (born 1969)
- Virke Lehtinen (1940–2022)
- Pekka Lehto (born 1948)
- Juha Lehtola (born 1966)
- Pekka Lehtosaari (born 1961)
- Hannu Leminen (1910–1997)
- Perttu Leppä (born 1964)
- Glory Leppänen (1901–1979)
- Åke Lindman (1928–2009)
- Armand Lohikoski (1912–2005)
- Aku Louhimies (born 1968)

== M ==
- William Markus (1917–1989)
- Aleksi Mäkelä (born 1969)
- Taru Mäkelä (born 1959)
- Aito Mäkinen (1927–2017)
- Visa Mäkinen (born 1945)
- Marko Mäkilaakso (born 1978)
- Auli Mantila (born 1964)
- Pekka Milonoff (born 1947)
- Rauni Mollberg (1929–2007)
- Taneli Mustonen (born 1978)

== N ==
- Mikko Niskanen (1929–1990)
- Yrjö Norta (1904–1988)
- Jorma Nortimo (1906–1958)
- Kaarlo Nuorvala (1910–1967)
- Lauri Nurkse (born 1978)

== O ==
- Risto Orko (1899–2001)

== P ==
- Teuvo Pakkala (1862–1925)
- Jaakko Pakkasvirta (1934–2018)
- Pekka Parikka (1939–1997)
- Heikki Partanen (1942–1990)
- Spede Pasanen (1930–2001)
- Antti Peippo (1934–1989)
- Hjalmar V. Pohjanheimo (1867–1936)
- Ilppo Pohjola (born 1957)
- Markku Pölönen (born 1957)
- Teuvo Puro (1884–1956)
- Timo Puustinen (born 1979)

== R ==
- Harri J. Rantala (born 1980)
- Mari Rantasila (born 1963)
- Marjut Rimminen
- Diana Ringo (born 1992)
- Pete Riski (born 1974)
- Mika Ronkainen (born 1970)

== S ==
- Olli Saarela (born 1965)
- Aleksi Salmenperä
- Ville Salminen (1908–1992)
- Toivo Särkkä (1890–1975)
- JP Siili (born 1964)
- Paul-Anders Simma (born 1959)
- Olli Soinio (1948–2018)
- Björn Soldan (1902–1953)
- Mauritz Stiller (1883–1928)

== T ==
- Mika Taanila
- Konrad Tallroth (1872–1926)
- Nyrki Tapiovaara (1911–1940)
- Aarne Tarkas (1923–1976)
- Miia Tervo (born 1980)
- Pia Tikka (born 1961)
- Pamela Tola (born 1981)
- Lauri Törhönen (born 1947)
- Samuli Torssonen (born 1978)
- Teuvo Tulio (1912–2000)

== U ==
- Ilmari Unho (1906–1961)

== V ==
- Valentin Vaala (1909–1976)
- Kari Väänänen (born 1953)
- Vanessa Vandy (born 1989)
- Hannes Vartiainen and Pekka Veikkolainen
- Pihla Viitala (born 1982)
- Selma Vilhunen (born 1976)
- Jukka Virtanen (1933–2019)
- Johanna Vuoksenmaa (born 1965)
- Timo Vuorensola (born 1979)

== W ==
- Jack Witikka (1916–2002)
- Casper Wrede (1929–1998) – also theatre and TV director

== See also ==
- Cinema of Finland
- List of Finns
