= Aikalainen =

- Directed by: Timo Puustinen
- Written by: Timo Puustinen
- Produced by: Anssi Mänttäri
- Starring: Kati Outinen
- Cinematography: Tahvo Hirvonen
- Edited by: Anssi Blomstedt
- Music by: Heikki Valpola
- Distributed by: Gaudeamus
- Release date: 16 March 1984
- Country: Finland
- Language: Finnish

Aikalainen is a 1984 Finnish film directed and written by Timo Linnasalo and Paavo Piskonen. Stars Paavo Piskonen, Kati Outinen, Rose-Marie Precht.

The film premiered on 16 March 1984 in Finland.

== Cast ==
- Anita Heikkinen
- Pekka Laiho
- Heikki Mäkelä
- Kati Outinen
- Pentti Pajukallio
- Matti Pellonpää
- Sulevi Peltola
- Paavo Piskonen
- Rose-Marie Precht
- Erkki Saarela

== See also ==
- List of Finnish films
