= Ståhlberg (surname) =

Ståhlberg is a Swedish-language surname.

== Geographical distribution ==
As of 2014, 56.6% of all known bearers of the surname Ståhlberg were residents of Sweden (frequency 1:12,608), 40.3% of Finland (1:9,886) and 1.7% of Estonia (1:57,464).

In Finland, the frequency of the surname was higher than national average (1:9,886) in the following regions:

1. Ostrobothnia (1:3,160)
2. Southwest Finland (1:4,846)
3. Uusimaa (1:5,080)

In Sweden, the frequency of the surname was higher than national average (1:12,608) in the following counties:

1. Gävleborg County (1:6,512)
2. Örebro County (1:6,633)
3. Uppsala County (1:7,604)
4. Blekinge County (1:7,697)
5. Dalarna County (1:8,480)
6. Västmanland County (1:9,263)
7. Östergötland County (1:9,945)
8. Värmland County (1:10,275)
9. Halland County (1:10,921)
10. Stockholm County (1:11,871)

== People ==
- Ester Ståhlberg (1870–1950), First Lady of Finland
- Fredrik Ståhlberg (born 1966), Swedish Army officer
- Gideon Ståhlberg (1908–1967), Swedish chess grandmaster
- Johan Gabriel Ståhlberg (1832–1873), Finnish priest
- Karl Emil Ståhlberg (1862–1919), Finnish photographer and engineer
- Kaarlo Juho Ståhlberg (1865–1952), President of Finland, the son of Johan Gabriel Ståhlberg
- Reijo Ståhlberg (born 1952), Finnish shot putter
