= Puustinen =

Puustinen is a Finnish surname. Notable people with the surname include:

- Jami Puustinen (born 1987), Finnish footballer
- Juuso Puustinen (born 1988), Finnish ice hockey player
- Risto Puustinen (born 1959), Finnish football manager and former footballer
- Sanna Puustinen (born 1988), Finnish curler
- Timo Puustinen (born 1979), Finnish film director
- Valtteri Puustinen (born 1999), Finnish ice hockey player
