= Milka – A Film About Taboos =

1980 film

- Directed by: Rauni Mollberg
- Written by: Rauni Mollberg; Timo K. Mukka
- Produced by: Rauni Mollberg
- Starring: Irma Huntus
- Cinematography: Markku Lehmuskallio
- Edited by: Tuula Mehtonen
- Release date: 19 December 1980
- Running time: 110 minutes
- Country: Finland
- Language: Finnish

Milka – A Film About Taboos (Finnish: Milka – elokuva tabuista) is a 1980 Finnish drama film directed by Rauni Mollberg. It was entered into the 31st Berlin International Film Festival.

== Plot ==
Milka is a 14-year-old girl who lives with her mother in a tiny isolated community in Northern Finland. The girl misses her dead father and prays to God to show her what love is. The mother employs a man named Ojanen (and nicknamed "Christ-Devil") to help in the hay making. He stays in the house and courts both the mother and the daughter. Later he vanishes unexpectedly, and the mother, who wished to marry him, notices that Milka is pregnant by him.

== Cast ==
- Irma Huntus as Milka Sierkkiniemi
- Leena Suomu as Anna Sierkkiniemi
- Matti Turunen as Ojanen, 'Kristus-Perkele'
- Eikka Lehtonen as Cantor Malmström
- Esa Niemelä as Auno Laanila
- Hellin Auvinen-Salmi as Villager
- Sirkka Metsäsaari as Mother Laanila
- Ulla Tapaninen as Ojanen's woman friend
- Toivo Tuomainen as Villager
- Tauno Lehtihalmes as Dean

== Production ==
Director Rauni Mollberg used amateurs, including 17-year-old schoolgirl Irma Huntus, who was cast in the title role. Huntus appeared nude in several scenes, which made her life difficult in the small village where she returned after the filming was over. (Huntus never appeared in another dramatic film, but was interviewed in a documentary on Mollberg four decades later.) Helena Ylänen wrote in the newspaper Helsingin Sanomat that Mollberg had "unleashed his fascination with the white naked human flesh. He makes a number of excuses to undress people, in particular the undeveloped girl's body of Milka."

In 2021, Irma Huntus said she regrets accepting her role in this film. When the movie came out, accompanied by major media visibility and a marketing campaign, Huntus could not find peace even in her hometown of Kaustinen, nor could she continue her education as before. While moving around the villages, the seventeen-year-old young woman heard insults from local men and women. "The crew or the filming team did not negatively affect or traumatize me in any way, but rather these subsequent consequences, the outrageous shouts from older men and devout women," she said.
