= Louis Sparre =

Swedish painter and designer

Pehr Louis Sparre
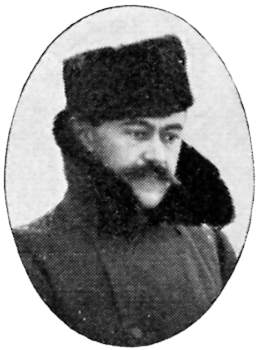

Personal information
- Full name: Pehr Louis Sparre af Söfdeborg
- Nationality: Swedish
- Born: 3 August 1863 Gravellona Lomellina, Kingdom of Italy
- Died: 26 October 1964 (aged 101) Stockholm, Sweden
- Spouse: Eva Mannerheim (m. 1893, died)

Sport
- Sport: Fencing

Count Pehr Louis Sparre af Söfdeborg (3 August 1863 – 26 October 1964) was a Swedish painter, designer and draughtsman, most noted for his early work in the Finnish national romanticism and jugend styles. He also competed in the individual and team épée fencing events at the 1912 Summer Olympics.

== Biography ==
Born in Gravellona Lomellina, Kingdom of Italy, he was the son of Pehr Ambjörn Sparre af Söfdeborg (1828–1921) and Teresita Adèle Josefa Gaetana Barbavara (1844–1867). His father had served as head of the banknote printing company for the Swedish central bank, Sveriges Riksbank. He spent his early childhood with his mother at Villa Teresita in Gravellona while his father was often on business trips. After having suffered an accident, his mother died when he was four years old. He then moved with his father in Paris prior to being sent to Sweden for schooling. He attended the Royal Swedish Academy of Fine Arts before relocating to Paris.

Sparre was a student at Académie Julian in Paris from 1887 until 1890. He studied with Akseli Gallen-Kallela, Eero Järnefelt and Emil Wikström and took part in painting trips in Karelia with Kallela and Wikström. Sparre is often mentioned as a founder of the Karelianism movement, along with Akseli Gallen-Kallela. He moved to Finland in 1889, where he lived for almost two decades. In 1893, Sparre married Eva Mannerheim (1870–1958), an artist and the sister of Carl Gustaf Emil Mannerheim.

In 1891, two of his works were exhibited at the Paris Salon. After the mid-1890s, Sparre reduced his work as a painter and instead worked on developing the industrial art and graphics industry in Finland. In 1897, he founded the Iris furniture and ceramics factory in Porvoo. Impressed by the pottery of the English-Belgian ceramist and painter Alfred William Finch, Sparre invited him to manage the ceramics department. By the request of his friend, Karl Emil Ståhlberg, Sparre also worked as the director for the first Finnish fictional film, the 20-minute-long Salaviinanpolttajat in 1907.

In 1908, Sparre returned to Sweden and continued his painting career, concentrating on portraiture and painting landscapes. By the time of his death in 1964 in Stockholm, aged 101, Sparre had completed over 500 portraits.

== Awards ==
- (Sweden) Swedish Fencing Federation Honorary Shield (Svenska fäktförbundets hederssköld) (1930)
