= Pehr Ambjörn Sparre =

Swedish inventor

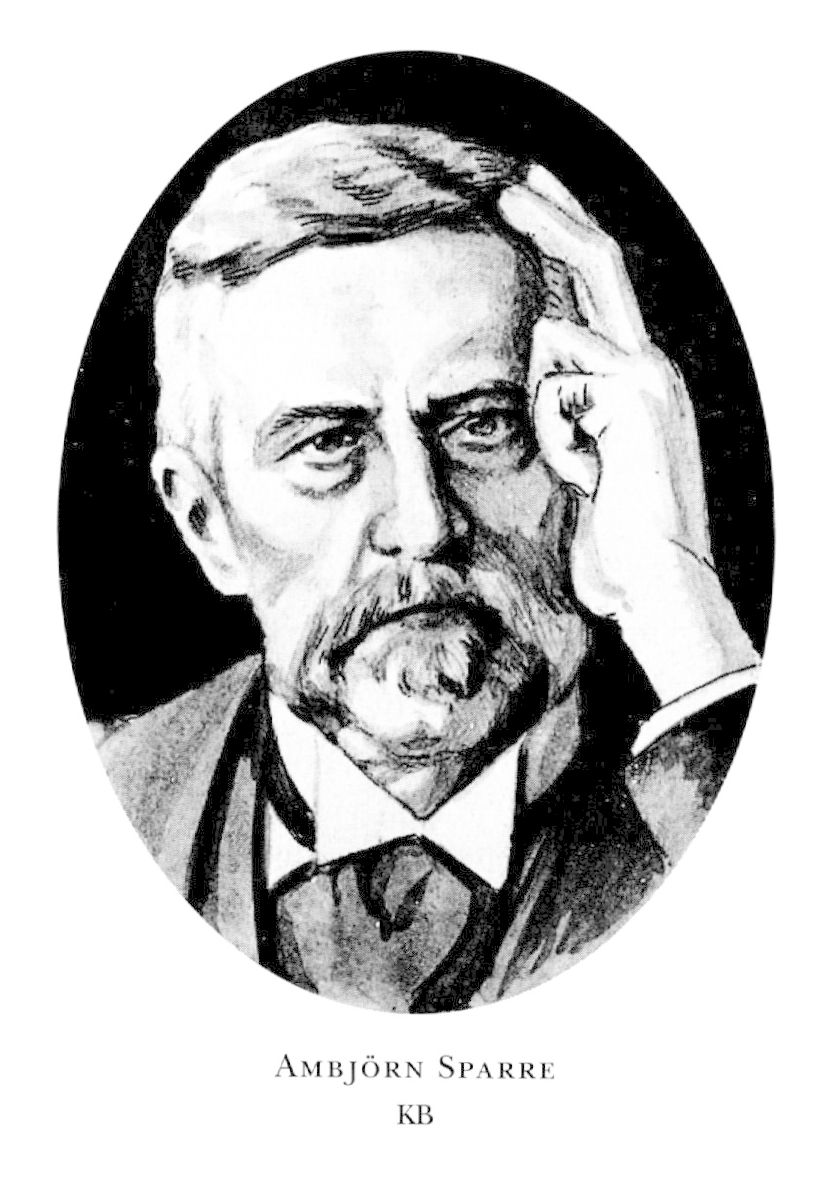
- Born: June 10, 1828; Karlskrona, Sweden
- Died: March 21, 1921 (aged 92); Paris, France
- Occupation: Inventor
- Known for: Sweden's First Postage Stamps
- Spouse: Terasita Adèle Josefa Gaëtana Barbavara di Gravellona
- Children: Pehr Louis Sparre af Söfdeborg

Count Pehr Ambjörn Sparre af Söfdeborg (10 June 1828 – 21 March 1921) was a Swedish inventor, most noted for his work on the first Swedish postage stamps.

== Early life and education ==
Born in Karlskrona, Blekinge County, Sweden, he was the son of colonel and author Count Pehr Georg Sparre and Eva Carolina Pihlgard. As a child, Sparre had already shown mechanical skill and inventiveness.

Sparre left home at age 19 to spend a year at Uppsala University (from 1847). After less than a year, he left in 1848, to become a student at Sweden's cradle of engineering, the Motala Verkstad (The Motala Mechanical Workshop) from 1848 to 1850. At Motala, he thrived under the guidance of workshop manager Otto Edvard Carlsund and Edward Albrekt Ollman. The three year apprenticeship at Motala, leading to a lifelong affinity for military constructions and a fascination with paper and papermaking.

== Career ==
He worked at the Riksbank's banknote paper mill in Tumba from 1852 to 1853, then became manager of the postage stamp printing plant in Stockholm from 1855 to 1857.

He later moved to Paris in 1861, living there most of the rest of his life, except for a stint as manager of the silk and wool patent weaving mill in Kalmar between 1876 and 1878.

=== Aeronaut ===
The Italian-Danish balloon pilot Joseph Tardini (1817–1851) came to Stockholm in the summer of 1851 with his hydrogen gas filled silk balloon "Samson". Tardini had sought his livelihood through daring balloon ascents across Europe and now sought success in Scandinavia. Tardini advertised for a willing volunteer passenger. Sparre was the only person brave enough to respond to the advertisement. The first flight took place from Tivoli on Djurgården in Stockholm on July 13, 1851. It was said to have been the first time that a Swede had taken off from the surface of the earth. After some initial difficulties, the historic journey went without a hitch, with the balloon landing after just under half an hour at Skurubron on Värmdön. Sparre and Tardini later made another flight, this time with a take-off point in Humlegården.

Two months later Tardini died in a ballooning accident in Copenhagen.

=== Banknote production ===
In the autumn of 1851, the position of head of the Riksbank's banknote printing plant became available, and the ambitious young Sparre decided to apply. As part of his preparation, he decided to try to produce counterfeit banknotes. He managed to produce a number of counterfeit 2 riksdaler banknotes which were delivered to the Riksbank board members. Sparre's counterfeit notes were almost identical to the genuine banknotes, except that his name was watermarked into the paper on the right side. Despite these efforts, the manager's position job was given to another, more experienced applicant: Professor Jonas Bagge. Bagge had developed a new banknote paper for Riksbank in the 1830s, and had become manager at the Tumba Bruk paper production mill.

Sparre was given Bagge's former managerial position at Tumba Bruk paper mill on a temporary appointment. His young age, however, caused problems, particularly with the accountant who was also Bagge's brother-in-law. After a year, Sparre's appointment expired and was not extended.

=== Postage stamp production ===
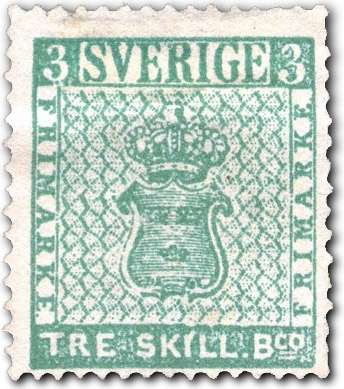
Sweden's First Postage Stamp: The 1855 Treskilling Green

In spite of this setback in banknote production, Sparre did not lose his interest in paper and papermaking. By the beginning of 1855, postage stamps had been introduced in at least 50 countries and territories around the world. It was only a matter of time before they would begin to be used in Sweden. A Riksdag decision on 25 October 1854 established a uniform rate for domestic letter postage, regardless of the distance, and letter boxes were introduced in the larger cities, so that it was no longer necessary to go to the post office to send a letter.

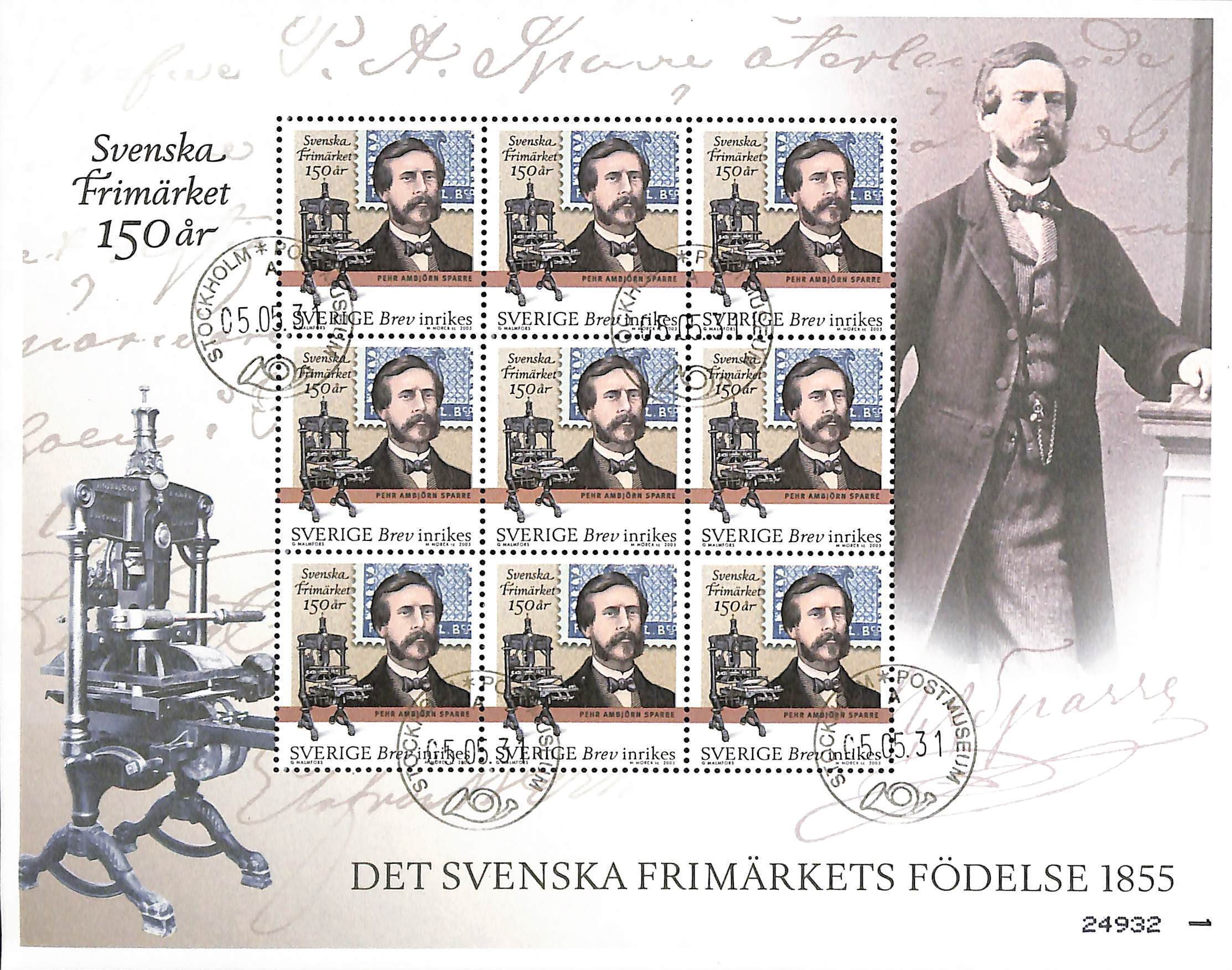
Pehr Ambjörn Sparre shown on a 2005 Swedish Souvenir Sheet celebrating the 150th Anniversary of Swedish Postage Stamps

Seeing an opportunity, Sparre established a printing house in Stockholm in early 1855 with two presses and a staff of three people. The Riksdag's October 1854 decision to introduce uniform postage and stamps was confirmed on 9 March 1855. By then the General Post Office had been negotiating with Sparre for several months, and he had submitted a tender for the production of postage stamps in December 1854. Having received unofficial assurances that he would be awarded the contract, Sparre had already ordered the necessary production machinery and tools in England.

The first Swedish stamps, the well-known skilling banco stamps with the national coat of arms in five denominations ranging from 3 to 24 Swedish skillings, were entirely the result of Sparre's work and ingenuity. He signed the approved original design and produced the master engraved die. This task alone was a huge challenge for Sparre, as the production of engraved dies, reversed and very small in size, is a very highly skilled job, requiring long-term training. The early Swedish stamps were produced using the letterpress method in which the raised areas on the printing plate deposited ink on the paper. Sparre was responsible not just for the printing but also for the perforation of the stamp sheets, which was done in a "Harrow" perforation machine he had constructed that perforated the entire sheet in a single action.

The spring of 1855 was a hectic time at Sparre's printing house. The first engraved master die was rejected by the Post Office and had to be laboriously redone. Added to this was the unfamiliarity with the complicated work of duplicating the engraved die using clichés, assembling the printing plates, followed by the actual printing and perforation. Learning and refining all of these activities led to a shortage of time. The agreement with the Post Office stipulated that the first stamp delivery would be made no later than 2 June 1855. This promise could not be fulfilled, but on 12 June 1855, three weeks before the stamps were to go on sale, Sparre was able to deliver 6,569 full sheets of 200 stamps each. Additional deliveries were made at the end of the month and the Swedish Post Office's need for postage stamps was secured, at least over the summer.

After a few years Sparre left the role of stamp manufacturer. Responsibility for the printing house was taken over by Georg Scheutz in 1857.

== Later life in France ==
Sparre moved to Paris in 1861 where he remained, with the exception of a few longer stays elsewhere, until his death. During the Franco-Prussian War of 1870–71 he was in the service of the French government. However, he retained his Swedish citizenship for the rest of his life. For Sparre himself, the activity as a stamp manufacturer was a marginal phenomenon; he saw himself rather as an expert on artillery, firearms and ammunition.

Sparre's continued work revolved around designs and inventions. His efforts spanned a wide range: security paper, weapons, bicycles and bicycle tires, flying machines, underwater vehicles and devices for closing bottles. The outcome of his labors was often uniform. An initial optimism from him and potential stakeholders was often followed by disappointments and major financial losses. Sparre seems never to have been discouraged and was always ready to take on new challenges. Some of his designs looked impressive at the early stage but performed less well when tested in practice. Some may also have been innovative, but ahead of their time.

At the beginning of the 1890s, Sparre began attempts to create a modern bicycle. After trying various designs that did not lead to any practical implementation, he concentrated his efforts on the wheels. He developed the puncture-proof, solid rubber tires, "Sparre tires", in England. For a time, they looked like they could be produced on a commercial scale, possibly also purchased in large quantities for war units in France and Russia. But the final, decisive strength tests in 1894 at the army bicycle factory in Puteaux, a suburb of Paris, did not turn out favorably.

For a period, Sparre sought to develop a flying machine that could take off straight from the ground, a technical challenge that only later, with the first autogiro in 1923 in Spain, approached a final solution. In general, Sparre was interested in means of communication. A long period of interest in balloons was replaced by thoughts of vehicles based on the heavier-than-air principle. Ships, warlike and peaceful, traveling on or under water, occupied much of his time. He recognized the value of the bicycle as a means of communication but rejected the car as unreliable and requiring maintenance. It could easily tip over in his opinion.

== Personal life ==
He married Terasita Adèle Josefa Gaëtana Barbavara di Gravellona (1844–1867) on 10 Sept 1862 in Ouchy, Switzerland. She was the daughter of the engineer Chevalier Luigi Barbavara and Count Constance de Maria di San Dalmazo. Their son, Count Pehr Louis Sparre af Söfdeborg (1863 – 1964), was a Swedish painter, designer and draughtsman.

== Death and legacy ==
Sparre died at the age of almost 93 in Paris and was buried in the Cimetière parisien de Bagneux near the city. His Latin motto is carved into the tombstone. It ingeniously includes both his name and his life: Perge Animo Sperare – Never cease to hope.
