= The Earth Is a Sinful Song =

1973 film

- Original Finnish film poster
- Directed by: Rauni Mollberg
- Written by: Rauni Mollberg; Pirjo Honkasalo
- Produced by: Rauni Mollberg
- Starring: Maritta Viitamäki
- Cinematography: Hannu Peltomaa; Kari Sohlberg
- Edited by: Marjatta Leporinne
- Release date: 2 November 1973
- Running time: 108 minutes
- Country: Finland
- Language: Finnish
- Box office: 709,287 admissions

The Earth Is a Sinful Song, The earth of our ancestors (Finnish: Maa on syntinen laulu) is a 1973 Finnish drama film directed by Rauni Mollberg and based on the novel Maa on syntinen laulu by late Finnish author Timo K. Mukka. It was entered into the 24th Berlin International Film Festival. The film was also selected as the Finnish entry for the Best Foreign Language Film at the 46th Academy Awards, but was not accepted as a nominee. It was the most successful film in Finland between 1972 and 1976.

== Cast ==
- Maritta Viitamäki as Martta Mäkelä
- Pauli Jauhojärvi as Juhani Mäkelä
- Aimo Saukko as Old man Mäkelä
- Milja Hiltunen as Alli Mäkelä
- Sirkka Saarnio as Elina Pouta
- Niiles-Jouni Aikio as Oula
- Veikko Kotavuopio as Kurki-Pertti
- Jouko Hiltunen as Hannes
- Osmo Hettula as The preacher
- Maija-Liisa Ahlgren as Aino Liinukorpi
- Kauko Jauhojärvi as Antti Lanto
- Irja Uusisalmi as Anna Kurkela
- Eelis Tiensuu as Poudan isäntä
- Elsa Kellinsalmi as Poudan emäntä
- Toivo Lampela as Outakodan vanhaisäntä

== See also ==
- List of submissions to the 46th Academy Awards for Best Foreign Language Film
- List of Finnish submissions for the Academy Award for Best Foreign Language Film
