= Särkkä =

Särkkä is a Finnish surname. Notable people with the surname include:

- Wille Särkkä (1877–1968), Finnish farmer and politician
- Toivo Särkkä (1890–1975), Finnish film producer and director
- Tony Särkkä (1972–2017), Swedish multi-instrumentalist
