= Rauni Mollberg =

Finnish film director (1929–2007)

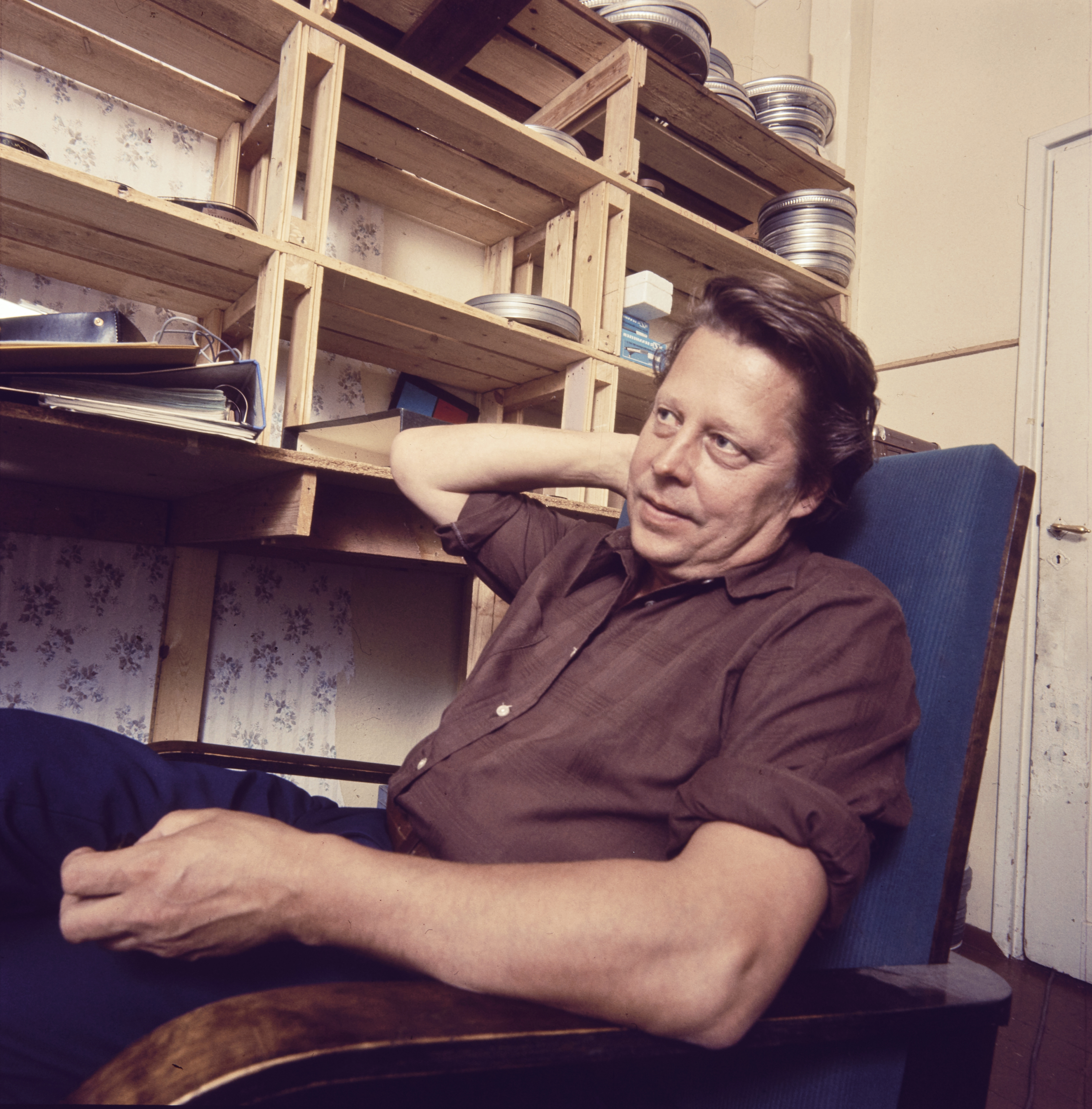
- Mollberg in 1977
- Born: 15 April 1929; Hämeenlinna, Finland
- Died: 11 October 2007 (aged 78); Loimaa, Finland
- Years active: 1967 – 2007

Rauni Mollberg (April 15, 1929 – October 11, 2007) was a Finnish film director who directed movies and TV movies.

== Career ==
In 1963 Mollberg directed movies for YLE. He directed a version of The Unknown Soldier in 1985, 30 years after Edvin Laine directed the original version of it. Mollberg's movie's plot was same as Laine's movie. But Mollberg used unknown actors and the movie was colourised and shot by a handhold camera.

Mollberg did not begin directing films for the cinema until he was well into his forties. He made a notable splash on the international festival circuit in 1974 with The Earth Is A Sinful Song (1973), his debut feature, an earthy, erotically-charged, blood-soaked tale of a young village girl's ill-fated affair with a Lapp reindeer herdsman. Based on a novel by the late Timo K. Mukka, one of Finland's most controversial young writers, the film "stunned Scandinavian critics and audiences alike with its simple, terrible power and its authentic sensuality" (Peter Cowie), and went on to become one of the biggest box-office successes in the Finnish cinema's history. It also introduced Mollberg's trademark style: "a realistic naturalism full of expressive force with which he merges the people with the scenery, stripping them bare of life's illusions and the polished veneer of culture" (Sakari Toiviainen). Despite Peter Cowie's efforts, and the acclaim of many other critics and "independent" festivals, The Finnish National Film board has stubbornly sequestered this masterpiece, only releasing it in a DVD format incompatible with international viewing, and lacking English subtitles.

During his career he was used to get wide audiences in Finland. His film The Earth is a Sinful Song (1973) sold 709,664 tickets and it is 11th on the list of most admissions to a Finnish film. 590,271 tickets were sold for the screenings of The Unknown Soldier (1985) making it the 17th highest-grossing movie in the history of Finland.

== Awards and nominations ==
Berlin International Film Festival: Nominated for Golden Bear (1974 and 1981 for films The Earth is a Sinful Song and Milka).

Locarno International Film Festival: Won Special prize for The Earth is a Sinful Song (1974).

Napoli Film Festival: Won Best Director award for Pretty Good for a Human (1978).

Jussi Awards: Best Director award for Sotaerakko (1973), The Earth is a Sinful Song (1974), Pretty Good for a Human (1978), The Unknown Soldier (1986), Best Producer award for Milka (1981).

== Filmography ==
- "Lapsuuteni", 1967
- Tehtaan varjossa, 1969
- Sotaerakko, 1972
- Maa on syntinen laulu, 1973
- Siunattu hulluus, 1975
- Aika hyvä ihmiseksi, 1977
- Milka – elokuva tabuista, 1980
- Tuntematon sotilas, 1985
- Ystävät, toverit, 1990
- Paratiisin lapset, 1994
- Taustan Mikon kotiinpaluu, 1999
- Ison miehen vierailu, 1999
- Puu kulkee, 2000
- Heikuraisen Nauru, 2001
- Korpisen veljekset, 2002
- Reissu, 2004
