= Salaviinanpolttajat =

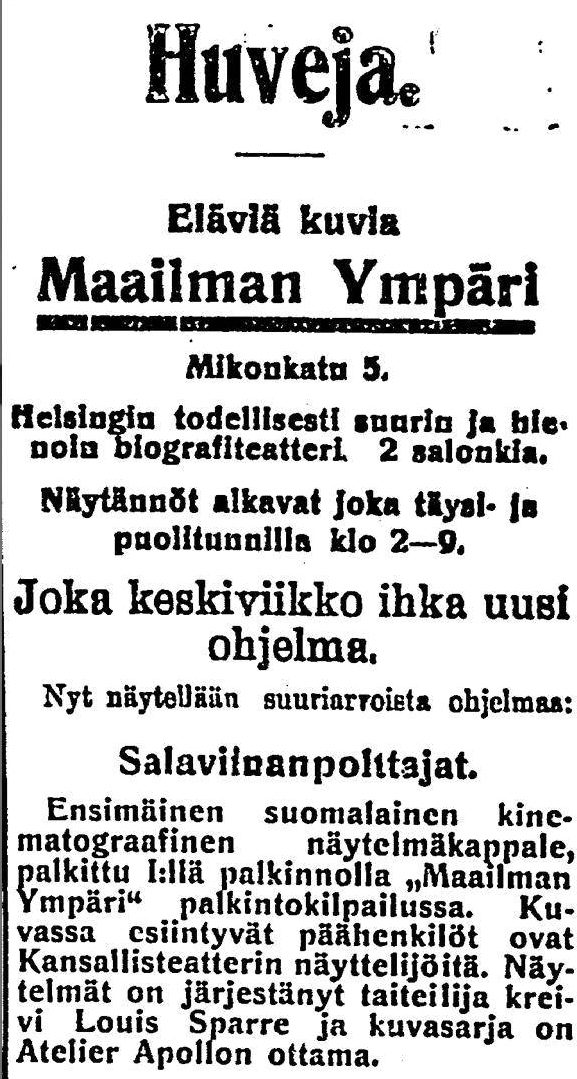
- Advertisement for the film, published in the 31 May 1907 issue of Helsingin Sanomat.
- Directed by: Louis Sparre; Teuvo Puro
- Written by: JV-s
- Produced by: Karl Emil Ståhlberg
- Starring: Eero Kilpi; Teppo Raikas; Teuvo Puro; Jussi Snellman; Axel Rautio
- Release date: 29 May 1907
- Running time: 20 minutes
- Country: Finland (Russian Empire)
- Language: Silent film

Salaviinanpolttajat (The Moonshiners) (Swedish: Lönnbrännare) is a 1907 Finnish film. It is generally considered to be the first fictional film made in Finland and in the Russian Empire and as such, the starting point of Finnish cinema industry. In 2017, a remake of the film was made based on the synopsis of the original film.

== Origin ==
The film's origins were in a screenplay writing contest commissioned by Atelier Apollo, owned by photographer and engineer Karl Emil Ståhlberg, who is now regarded as the father of Finnish cinema. The contest was won by the pseudonym "J. V-s", who some speculated was actually Ståhlberg himself, but other sources say he was a local sheriff. The screenplay was adapted and the film was directed by a friend of Ståhlberg, the Swedish count and artist Louis Sparre.

== Plot ==
No prints of the film have survived so the film is considered lost. The original screenplay has also been lost. However, some plot descriptions are still known based on contemporary newspaper advertisements of the film.

As the name would indicate, the film tells about two local men who are making moonshine in the woods. A customer comes to them, and while sampling the product they start a game of cards, which eventually leads to a fight. While the fight is going on, the local police shows up and arrests the makers while the customer manages to escape.
