= Matti Ijäs =

Finnish television and film director and screenwriter

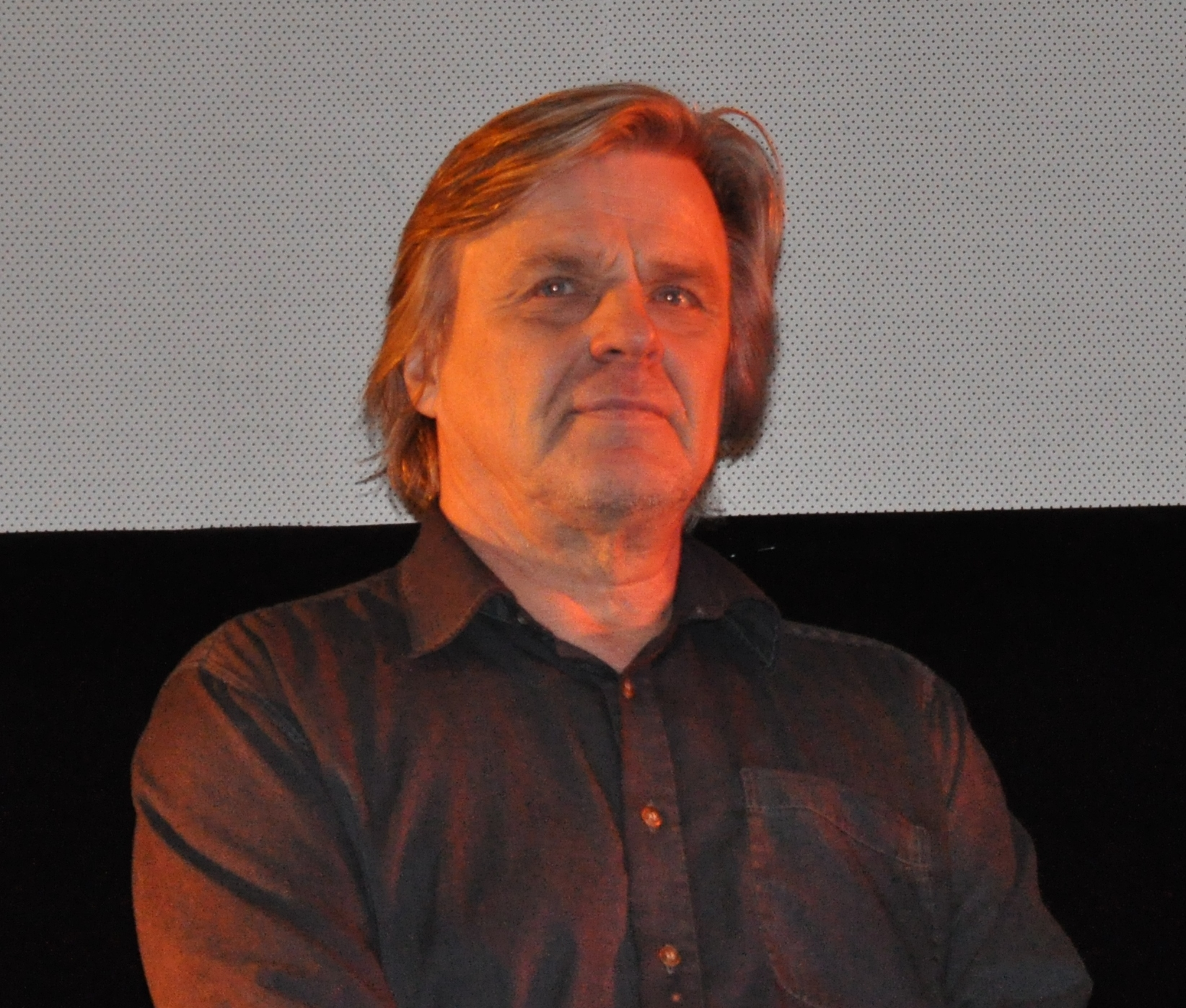
Matti Ijäs in 2010.

Matti Ijäs (Finnish pronunciation: [ˈmɑtːi ˈijæs]; born 25 February 1950 in Helsinki) is a Finnish television and film director and screenwriter. His works for television and cinema are characterised by eccentric characters, awkward situations, warm deadpan humour and witty dialogue. His recurrent themes include birth and death and other beginnings and ends. Often writing, co-writing, or adapting his own screenplays, he is considered one of the few true auteurs in Finnish cinema alongside Aki Kaurismäki.

== Biography ==
Matti Ijäs grew up in Töölö, Helsinki. His mother worked as an architect, and his father was a construction manager for the Finnish Defence Forces. Ijäs studied journalism at the Tampere University but never graduated after getting a job at Yleisradio, the Finnish Broadcasting Company, making children's television programmes at their regional studio in Turku. Embracing Marxist ideas like many Finnish artists and media people in the 1970s, Ijäs made children's documentaries about such themes as Chilean refugees to Finland and the international peace movement. His first major work was Läskilinssi, a 1976 miniseries about a boy facing bullying because of his appearance. Many of his short films for children were awarded at the Tampere Film Festival.

Ijäs' first exercise in feature-length filmmaking was co-writing the Finnish-Hungarian coproduction Duty Free Marriage (Vámmentes házasság, 1980), directed by János Zsombolyai, and Mikko Niskanen’s youth drama Gotta Run! (Ajolähtö, 1982). After these, Ijäs became writer and director for Yle's TV1 channel, making highly individual television comedy dramas such as The Last Gig (Viimeinen keikka, 1984) The Wrestler (Painija, 1985), and Katsastus (1988).

His earliest theatrically released films include The Comedian (Koomikko, 1983), Dolly and Her Lover (Räpsy ja Dolly eli Pariisi odottaa, 1990), and Lyrics and Lace (Pilkkuja ja pikkuhousuja, 1992). Returning to the coming-of-age themes of his children's TV years, he made Blindfolded (Sokkotanssi, 1999) and Blue Corner (Haaveiden kehä, 2002).

Alternating between television and film work, Ijäs has remained a prolific director. In addition to children and young people, his main characters often include middle-aged and elderly people, such as in TV movies White Marble (Pala valkoista marmoria, 1998), Lahja (1997), The Fence (Aita, 2001) and Tuulikaappimaa (2003).

In 2000, Matti Ijäs received the Finnish State Award for Cinema. In 2002 he was awarded the Pro Finlandia Medal by the Order of the Lion of Finland.
