= Karl Emil Ståhlberg =

Finnish photographer and engineer (1862–1919)

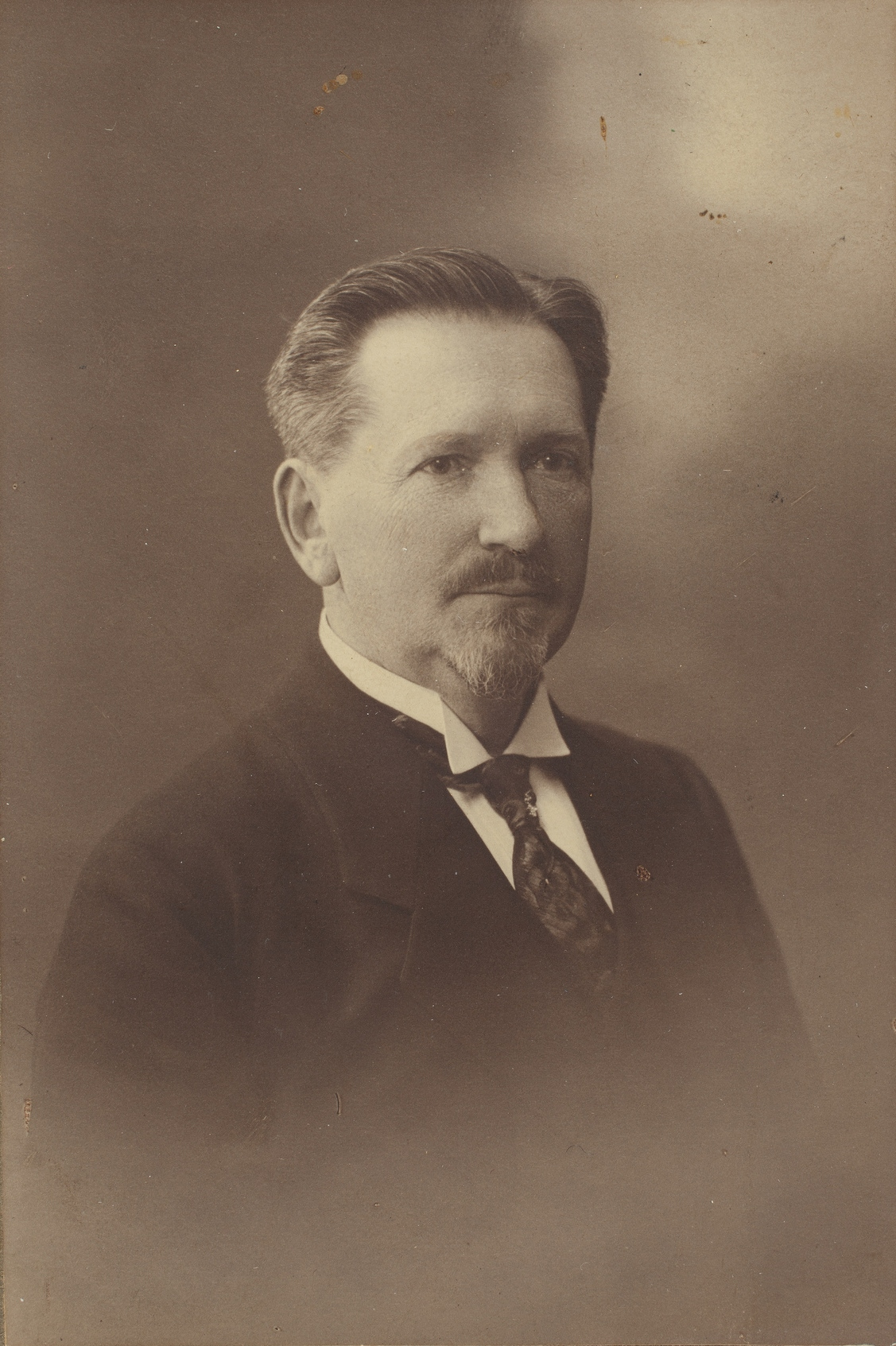
- Born: 30 November 1862; Kuhmo
- Died: 27 June 1919 (aged 56); Helsinki
- Occupations: photographer, engineer

Karl Emil Ståhlberg (30 November 1862 – 27 June 1919) was a Finnish photographer and engineer. He founded and managed his own studio Atelier Apollo in Helsinki.

On 3 April 1904, K. E. Ståhlberg opened Finland's first film theater called Världen Runt – Maailman Ympäri. He also became the country's first film producer, who initially specialized in creating short documentary films. In 1907, Ståhlberg started a screenplay contest which eventually led to the creation of the first Finnish fictional film, Salaviinanpolttajat. Ståhlberg also produced the film and hired his friend, the painter Louis Sparre to direct it.

K. E. Ståhlberg was born in Kuhmo, and was the cousin of Finland's first president Kaarlo Juho Ståhlberg.
