= Timo Puustinen =

Finnish film director

Timo Sakari Puustinen is a Finnish film director, screenwriter, and film producer. He is a co-founder of Kajawood Studios, and his work spans films, music videos, and commercials across the Nordic and European markets. Puustinen is known for blending the dynamism of American storytelling with the depth of Finnish tradition.

== Career ==
He directed, wrote, and produced the 2005 horror film Aika tappaa. He also directed Sanansaattaja (2010), which was released direct-to-DVD. His latest directorial work, Under the Northern Skies, merges Finnish mythology, the raw beauty of the North, and the unique music of Ida Elina.

Puustinen is a filmmaker whose productions have been showcased in over 12 countries. He has received MTV3’s Regional Commercial of the Year awards in 2008 and 2012, as well as the Audience Award and Bronze Medal at the Finnish Music Video Awards in 2009. With over 100 productions to his name, his strength lies in his holistic understanding of all aspects of filmmaking.

Puustinen's first production company was Coppersky Oy (CopperSky Productions), founded in 2004. He is also the co-owner of Frozen Flame Pictures Oy, established in 2014 together with producer Miika J. Norvanto. Together, they produced the superhero films Rendel and Rendel: Cycle of Revenge. The latter faced significant production challenges, including the dismissal of the original director during filming. The producers completed the film themselves, with screenwriter Pekka Lehtosaari contributing to the final version.

Puustinen and Norvanto also produced the international action-horror-comedy film The Creeps (2025), directed by Marko Mäkilaakso and starring Christopher Lambert, Chris Cavalier, and Veronica Jarvis. The film premiered at the European Film Market and was officially selected for the BIFFF 2025.

== Selected filmography ==
- Aika tappaa (2005) – Director, writer, producer
- Sanansaattaja (2010) – Director
- Jouluiloa Ukrainaan (2019) – Director
- Johannes ei kulje Jämsän kautta (2023) – Producer
- Rendel: Cycle of Revenge (2024) – Producer
- Kylmän Sydän (2025) – Producer
- The Creeps (2025) – Producer
