= List of war films and TV specials set between 1914 and 1945 =

These are depictions of diverse aspects of war in film and television, including but not limited to documentaries, TV mini-series, drama serials, and propaganda film. The list starts before World War I, followed by the Roaring Twenties, and then the Great Depression, which eventually saw the outbreak of World War II in 1939, which ended in 1945. The Cold War which soon followed generated its own productions.

== Mexican Revolution (1910–1920),Mexican Border War (1910–1919) Cristero War (1926–1929), and Pancho Villa Expedition (1916–1917) ==
(also see List of Mexican Revolution and Cristero War films)

- Revolution Trilogy (1933–1936)
- Viva Villa! (1934)
- Sucedió en Jalisco (Los cristeros) (1947)
- La negra Angustias (1950)
- Viva Zapata! (1952)
- They Came to Cordura (1959)
- A Bullet for the General (Quien Sabe?) (1966)
- The Mercenary (1968)
- Villa Rides (1968)
- 100 Rifles (1969)
- The Wild Bunch (1969)
- Zapata (1970)
- A Fistful of Dynamite (1971)
- Sucedió en Jalisco (1972), remake of the 1947 film
- Three Amigos (1986)
- Old Gringo (1989)
- And Starring Pancho Villa as Himself (2003), HBO made-for-television film
- Zapata: El sueño de un héroe (2004)
- The Last Christeros (2011), chronicling Cristero rebels who fought the Mexican government into the early 1930s
- For Greater Glory (2012)
- Chicograndre (2010), Film about the Pancho Villa/Mexican Expedition
- La Sangre de un Valiente, aka El Hombre de Hierro (1993), Mexican film about the Pancho Villa/Mexican Expedition

== US Intervention in Nicaragua / Nicaraguan Civil War (1912–1933) ==
- Flight (1929)
- The Marines Are Coming (1934)
- The Marines Fly High (1940)
- Sandino (1990)

== World War I (1914–1918) ==
(See also: List of World War I films and World War I films)

- My Four Years in Germany (1918)
- Pack Up Your Troubles (1932)
- Alexander's Ragtime Band (1938)
- Yankee Doodle Dandy (1942), biopic of George M. Cohan
- Wilson (1944), biopic of President Woodrow Wilson
- Johnny Got His Gun (1971)
- The Young Indiana Jones Chronicles (1992–1993 TV series)
- Haber (2008), the life of Fritz Shimon Haber and his contribution to the development of chemical warfare during World War I

=== Western Front (1914–1918) ===
- The Little American (1917)
- The Unbeliever (1918)
- Hearts of the World (1918)
- Shoulder Arms (1918)
- The Four Horsemen of the Apocalypse (1921)
- The Big Parade (1925)
- The Better 'Ole (1926)
- What Price Glory (1926)
- 7th Heaven (1927)
- Barbed Wire (1927)
- The Somme (1927)
- The Patent Leather Kid (1927)
- Carry on, Sergeant! (1928)
- Verdun, visions d'histoire (1928), depiction of the Battle of Verdun
- The Black Watch (1929)
- She Goes to War (1929)
- Westfront 1918 (1930)
- War Nurse (1930)
- All Quiet on the Western Front (1930)
- Journey's End (1930)
- Doughboys (1930)
- Hell on Earth (1931)
- The Other Side (1931)
- Wooden Crosses (1932)
- Today We Live (1933)
- Pilgrimage (1933)
- The Road to Glory (1936)
- Unternehmen Michael (1937)
- The Road Back (1937)
- La Grande Illusion (1937)
- Patrioten (1937)
- Block-Heads (1938)
- Who Goes Next? (1938)
- Fighting 69th (1940)
- The Great Dictator (1940) set during World War I and the inter-war period.
- Sergeant York (1941), story of MOH recipient Alvin York
- What Price Glory (1952)
- The Sergeant's Daughter (1952)
- Paths of Glory (1957), French troops are sacrificed in pointless battles
- Hemingway's Adventures of a Young Man (1962)
- King and Country (1964)
- Thomas the Impostor (1964)
- King of Hearts (1966)
- Oh! What a Lovely War (1969)
- Fräulein Doktor (1969), spy drama from the German point of view
- Up the Front (1972)
- All Quiet on the Western Front (1979)
- Blackadder Goes Forth (1989), comedy-miniseries following a couple of British Soldiers in a trench in Flanders
- Hedd Wyn (1992)
- Legends of the Fall (1994), American brothers go off to war with the Canadian Army
- Regeneration (1997), British medical staff deal with PTSD
- The Trench (1999), depiction of British troops in the Battle of the Somme
- The Lost Battalion (2001), American battalion during the Argonne Forest battle
- Deathwatch (2002)
- Company K (2004), U.S. Marines in France
- A Very Long Engagement (2004)
- Joyeux Noël (Merry Christmas) (2005), depicting the unofficial Christmas truce of 1914
- La France (2007)
- Finding Rin Tin Tin (2007)
- Passchendaele (2008), Canadian troops in Flanders
- My Boy Jack (2008), story of Rudyard Kipling's soldier son Jack
- Beneath Hill 60 (2010), Australian tunneling engineers
- War Horse (2011), a horse's journey through the Western Front
- Birdsong (2012)
- Forbidden Ground (2013)
- The Wipers Times (2013)
- An Accidental Soldier (2013)
- Testament of Youth (2014)
- Our World War (TV series)
- Wonder Woman (2017)
- Journey's End (2017)
- Trench 11 (2017)
- Sajjan Singh Rangroot (2018)
- 1917 (2019)
- All Quiet on the Western Front (2022)

=== Eastern Front (1914–1918) ===
- Hotel Imperial (1927)
- Outskirts (1933)
- Captured! (1933)
- Hotel Imperial (1939)
- The Good Soldier Schweik (1956)
- Forest of the Hanged (1964)
- Doctor Zhivago (1965)
- Signum Laudis (1980)
- The Woman and the Stranger (1985)
- Doctor Zhivago (2002)
- Admiral (2008) (Адмиралъ in Russian)
- Josef (2011)
- Battalion (2015) («Батальон» in Russian)
- Blizzard of Souls (2019)

=== Italian Front (1915–1918) ===
- Berge in Flammen (1931)
- A Farewell to Arms (1932)
- Militiaman Bruggler (1936)
- Il caimano del Piave (1951)
- I cinque dell'Adamello (1954)
- A Farewell to Arms (1957)
- In Love and War (1958)
- La Grande guerra (1959)
- The Shortest Day (1962)
- Uomini contro (1970)
- In Love and War (1996)
- The Border (1996)
- Greenery Will Bloom Again (2014)
- The Silent Mountain (2014)
- Torneranno i prati (2014)

=== Middle Eastern theatre of World War I (1914–1918) ===
- Ravished Armenia (1919), depiction of the Armenian genocide based on the eyewitness account by Aurora Mardiganian.
- Tell England (1931)
- The Lost Patrol (1934)
- Uproar in Damascus (1939)
- Forty Thousand Horsemen (1940)
- Lawrence of Arabia (1962), depiction of the Battle of Aqaba and campaigns in Arabia
- Gallipoli (1981), depiction of young Australian soldiers in the Battle of Gallipoli
- Anzacs (1985), miniseries following Australian and New Zealand troops from recruitment to Gallipoli and the Western Front
- The Lighthorsemen (1987), depiction of Australians at the Battle of Beersheba
- Chunuk Bair (film) (1992)
- All the King's Men (1999), British troops disappear during the Gallipoli campaign
- Gallipoli (2005), documentary
- 120 (film) (2008)
- Çanakkale 1915 (2012)
- Gallipoli: End of the Road (2013)
- Theeb (2014)
- Deadline Gallipoli (2015), TV miniseries depicting the Gallipoli Campaign from the point of view of war correspondents
- Gallipoli (miniseries) (2015), TV miniseries adapted from the book by Les Carlyon
- The Promise (2016), depiction of the Armenian genocide

=== African theatre of World War I (1914–1918) ===
- Mamba (1930)
- The Last Outpost (1935)
- The African Queen (1951)
- Black and White in Color (1976)
- Shout at the Devil (1976)
- Fort Saganne (1984)
- Jungle Cruise (2021)

=== Asian and Pacific theatre of World War I (1914) ===
- Siege of Fort Bismarck (1963) Siege of Tsingtao

=== Serbian Campaign of World War I (1914–1918) ===
- Sa verom u Boga (1932), Serbian silent film
- Ultimatum (1938), the backdrop of the July Crisis, between the assassination of Archduke and the beginning of the First World War
- March on the Drina (1964), Serbian victory over Austria-Hungary in the Battle of Cer in August 1914
- Kolubarska bitka (1990), TV film about the Serbian victory against Austria-Hungary in the Battle of Kolubara in November 1914
- Toplički ustanak (1991), TV documentary about the Serb rebellion in 1917 carried out by Serbian guerrillas against the Bulgarian occupation force in the eastern part of Serbia
- Capitaine Conan (1996), French soldiers in Salonika and Bulgaria
- Where the Yellow Lemon Blooms (2006), Serbia's exodus after a joint offensive by Germany, Austria-Hungary and Bulgaria in the winter of 1915/16
- St. George Shoots the Dragon (2009)
- Milunka Savić – heroina Velikog rata (2013), docu-drama about Milunka Savić, the most decorated female soldier of the Great War, veteran of three wars
- Heroj 1914 (2014), docu-drama about the successful Serbian defense against Austria-Hungary in 1914
- The Man Who Defended Gavrilo Princip (2014), true story of Rudolf Cestler, who defended members of the 'Young Bosnia' in court
- Zaspanka za vojnika (2018)
- King Peter I (2018)

=== Naval warfare of World War I (1914–1918) ===
- Wrath of the Seas (1926)
- The Blue Eagle (1926)
- The Battles of Coronel and Falkland Islands (1927)
- Men Without Women (1930)
- Seas Beneath (1931)
- Suicide Fleet (1931)
- Hell Below (1933)
- Morgenrot (1933)
- Born for Glory (1935)
- Submarine Patrol (1938)
- Thunder Afloat (1939)
- The Spy in Black (1939)
- Hell Below Zero (1954)
- Moonzund (1987)
- Sinking of the Lusitania: Terror at Sea (2007)
- Admiral (2008)
- Die Männer der Emden (2012)

=== Aviation in World War I (1915–1918) ===
- Midnight Lovers (1926)
- Wings (1927), air warfare
- The Legion of the Condemned (1928)
- The Sky Hawk (1929)
- Lilac Time (1928)
- The Shopworn Angel (1928)
- The Dawn Patrol (1930), air warfare
- Hell's Angels (1930)
- Young Eagles (1930)
- The Eagle and the Hawk (1933)
- Ace of Aces (1933)
- Crimson Romance (1934)
- Hell in the Heavens (1934)
- The Shopworn Angel (1938)
- The Dawn Patrol (1938), air warfare
- Captain Eddie (1945)
- Lafayette Escadrille (1958)
- The Blue Max (1966), air warfare
- Darling Lili (1970)
- Von Richthofen and Brown (1971), air warfare
- Zeppelin (1971), air warfare
- Aces High (1976), air warfare
- Biggles: Adventures in Time (1986), air warfare
- Flyboys (2006), air warfare
- The Red Baron (2008), depiction of Manfred von Richthofen
- The Lafayette Escadrille (Documentary) 2010, Flying and Fighting for France, April, 1916 – December, 1917

=== Spy fiction in World War I ===
- Yankee Doodle in Berlin (1919)
- Mare Nostrum (1926)
- Dishonored (1931)
- Mata Hari (1931)
- I Was a Spy (1933)
- Stamboul Quest (1934)
- The Crouching Beast (1935)
- Rendezvous (1935)
- Secret Agent (1936)
- Dark Journey (1937)
- Street of Shadows (1937)
- Nurse Edith Cavell (1939)
- British Intelligence (1940)
- Mata Hari, Agent H21 (1965)
- Fräulein Doktor (1969)
- Reilly, Ace of Spies (1983)
- Mata Hari (1985)
- Ashenden (1991)
- Mata Hari (2017)
- The King's Man (2021)

== Russian Civil War (1917–1922) ==
- The Forty-First (1927)
- Tempest (1928)
- Tommy (1931)
- Chapaev (1934)
- The Three Women (1936)
- Friends (1938)
- Lenin in 1918 (1939)
- Shchors (1939)
- The Forty-First (1956)
- Miles of Fire (1957)
- Comissar (1967)
- The Elusive Avengers (1967)
- Two Comrades Were Serving (1968)
- The Adjutant of His Excellency (1969 miniseries)
- White Sun of the Desert (1969)
- Bumbarash (1971)
- The Flight (1970)
- Dauria (1971)
- Capitaine Conan (1996), French Army in the Bessarabian front
- Admiral (2008)
- Doctor Zhivago (2002) Television mini series
- Quiet Flows the Don (2006)
- The White Guard (2012) Television series

=== Russian Revolution (1917) ===
- The End of St. Petersburg (1927)
- October: Ten Days That Shook the World (1927)
- Arsenal (1928)
- The Last Command (1928)
- The Red Dance (1928)
- Rasputin and the Empress (1932)
- British Agent (1934)
- Lenin in October (1937)
- Doctor Zhivago (1965)
- Reds (1981)

=== Finnish Civil War (1918) ===
- 1918 (1957)
- Here, Beneath the North Star (1968)
- Lunastus (1997)
- Raja 1918 (2007)
- Tears of April (2008)
- Under the North Star (2009)

=== Latvian War of Independence (1918–1920) ===
- Rigas Sargi (Defenders of Riga) (2007)
- Blizzard of Souls (2019)

=== Estonian War of Independence (1918–1920) ===
- Noored Kotkad (The Young Eagles) (1927)
- Nimed marmortahvlil (Names in Marble) (2002)

=== Hungarian–Romanian War (1919) ===
- Csillagosok, katonák (1967)
- Magyar rapszódia (1979)

=== Polish–Soviet War (1919–1921) ===
- Battle of Warsaw 1920 (2011)

== Irish War of Independence (1919–1921) and Irish Civil War (1922–1923) ==
(also see List of Irish revolutionary period films)

- Irish Destiny (1926)
- The Key (1934)
- The Informer (1935)
- Beloved Enemy (1936)
- The Plough and the Stars (1937)
- My Life for Ireland (1941)
- The Quiet Man (1952)
- Shake Hands With The Devil (1959)
- Insurrection (1965) TV Miniseries
- Ryan's Daughter (1970)
- Michael Collins (1996)
- Rebel Heart (2001) TV Miniseries
- The Wind That Shakes The Barley (2006)
- The Secret Scripture (2016)
- Rebellion (2016) TV Miniseries
- Resistance (2019) TV Miniseries

== Greco-Turkish War (1919–1922) ==
- Ateşten Gömlek (1923)
- You Can't Win 'Em All (1970)
- 1922 (1978)
- Kurtulus (1994)
- Stone Mektep (2013)
- The Water Diviner (2014)

== Second Italo-Senussi War (1922–1932) ==
- Lion of the Desert (1981)

== Chinese Civil War (1927–1949) ==
=== Communist insurgency (1927–1937) ===
- Shanghai Express (1932)
- The Bitter Tea of General Yen (1933)
- The Painted Veil (1934)
- West of Shanghai (1937)
- Wan shui qian shan (1959)
- Red Guards on Honghu Lake (1961)
- The Red Detachment of Women (1961)
- The Sand Pebbles (film) (1966)
- Sparkling Red Star (1974)
- Dadu River (1980)
- Sparkling Red Star (2007)
- Brothers (2016)
- The Founding of an Army (2017)

=== Chinese Communist Revolution (1945–1949) ===
- Blood Alley (1955)
- Yangtse Incident (1957), story of the gunboat HMS Amethyst in 1949
- A Home Too Far (1990), shows the 1949 exodus of the Kuomintang 93rd Division to the Burmese border to escape persecution by the Communists
- Assembly (2007), depicts the People's Liberation Army in one of the final battles of the Chinese Civil War as well as the People's Volunteer Army in the Korean War
- The Founding of a Republic (2009), depicts the major battles and political episodes in the Chinese Civil War from the end of World War II in 1945 to the proclamation of the People's Republic of China in 1949
- The Taking of Tiger Mountain (2014)
- The Crossing (2014)

== Taiwanese rebellions against Japanese rule (1930) ==
- Seediq Bale (2011)

== Japanese_invasion_of_Manchuria(1931) ==
- Men and War Part 1 (1973)

== Chaco War (1932–1935) ==
- Storm Over the Andes (1935)
- Thirst (1960)
- Hamaca paraguaya (2006)
- Boquerón (2015) about the battle of same name.

== Second Italo-Ethiopian War (1935–1939) ==
- Time to Kill (1989)

== Spanish Civil War (1936–1939) ==
(also see List of Spanish Civil War films)

- The Last Train from Madrid (1937)
- The Spanish Earth (Joris Ivens (1937)
- Legion Condor (1939)
- Espoir: Sierra de Teruel (1939, released 1945)
- L'Assedio dell' Alcazar (1940)
- Raza (1942)
- For Whom the Bell Tolls (1943)
- The Fallen Sparrow (1943)
- The Angel Wore Red (1960)
- Five Cartridges (Fünf Patronenhülsen, GDR 1960)
- Behold a Pale Horse, (1964)
- Viva la Muerte (1971)
- The Spirit of the Beehive (1973)
- La Colmena (1982)
- Bicycles Are for the Summer (1984)
- The Heifer (1985)
- Si Te Dicen Que Cai (1989)
- ¡Ay, Carmela! (1990)
- Belle Époque (1992)
- Land and Freedom (1995)
- À la vie, à la mort! (1995)
- Libertarias (1996)
- Vivir la Utopia (1998)
- La hora de los valientes (1998)
- Butterfly's Tongue (1998), same as: La Lengua de las Mariposas (1999)
- The Devil's Backbone (2001)
- Soldados de Salamina (2002)
- Carol's Journey (2002)
- Head in the Clouds (2004)
- Pan's Labyrinth (2006)
- Las 13 rosas (2007)
- Little Ashes (2008)
- The Blind Sunflowers (2008)
- The Anarchist's Wife (2008)
- The Last Circus (2010)
- Pájaros de papel (2010)
- There Be Dragons (2011)
- The Sleeping Voice (2011)
- Hemingway & Gellhorn (2012)
- Spain divided: The Civil War in Color (2016) a documentary that recreates all the episodes of the war in Color. It is considered one of the best documentaries made on the war.
- Gernika (2016)
- The Endless Trench (2019)
- La Bola Negra (2026)

== Second Sino-Japanese War (1937–1945) ==
- Chocolate and Soldiers (1938)
- Mud and Soldiers (1939)
- Legend of Tank Commander Nishizumi (1940)
- Moyuru ōzora (1940)
- Flying Tigers (1942)
- Lady from Chungking (1942)
- Night Plane from Chungking (1943)
- China (1943)
- Dragon Seed (1944)
- China Sky (1945)
- God Is My Co-Pilot (1945)
- China's Little Devils (1945)
- My Home Village (1949)
- Letter with Feather (1954)
- The Human Condition (1959–1961)
- The Mountain Road (1960)
- Tunnel War (1965)
- Men and War (1970–73)
- One and Eight (1983)
- Red Sorghum (1987)
- Empire of the Sun (1987)
- Evening Bell (1988)
- Men Behind the Sun (1988)
- Don't Cry, Nanking (1995)
- Black Sun: The Nanking Massacre (1995)
- Lover's Grief over the Yellow River (1999)
- Devils on the Doorstep (2000)
- Purple Sunset (2001)
- Purple Butterfly (2003)
- On the Mountain of Tai Hang (2005)
- Nanking (2007), film about the 1937 Nanking Massacre committed by the Japanese army in the former capital city Nanjing, China
- The Children of Huang Shi (2008)
- City of Life and Death (2009)
- John Rabe (2009)
- Caterpillar (2010)
- Death and Glory in Changde (2010)
- The Flowers of War (2011)
- Resistance (2011)
- Back to 1942 (2012)
- A Tale of Three Cities (2015)
- The Hundred Regiments Offensive (2015)
- Railroad Tigers (2016)
- The Chinese Widow (2017)
- Our Time Will Come (2017)
- Air Strike (2018)
- The Eight Hundred (2020)
- Dead to Rights (2025)
- Evil Unbound (2025)
- Gezhi Town (2025)

== Soviet–Japanese border conflicts (1939) ==
- Men and War, Part III (1973); Japanese-Soviet co-production
- My Way (2011)

== World War II (1939–1945) ==
Because World War II is the most documented war on film and TV, it is also recommended to see List of World War II films for a more detailed list of films. (also see World War II films)

- Buck Privates (1941)
- Great Guns (1941)
- Air Raid Wardens (1943)
- The Big Noise (1944)
- The Best Years of Our Lives (1946), US veterans return home
- Buck Privates Come Home (1947)
- Jolson Sings Again (1949)
- Hitler (1962)
- La Grande Vadrouille (1966)
- The Night of the Generals (1967), homicide investigator on the track of an SS general
- Fragments of War: The Story of Damien Parer (1988)
- Good (2008)

=== Invasion of Poland (1939) ===
- The Eagle (1959)
- Lotna (1959)
- Westerplatte (1967), Polish defenders in the Battle of Westerplatte
- Hubal (1973)
- The Tin Drum (film) (1979) Free City of Danzig before and during World War II.
- Operacja Himmler (1979)
- Jutro idziemy do kina (2007)
- Tajemnica Westerplatte (2013)

=== Polish resistance movement in World War II (1939–1945) ===
- Unvanquished City (1950)
- A Generation (1954)
- Kanal (1956), depiction of the 1944 Warsaw Uprising
- Eroica (1958)
- To Save the City (1976)
- Soldiers of Freedom (1977)
- Akcja pod Arsenałem (1978)
- Uprising (2001) TV movie depicting the Warsaw Ghetto Uprising
- Obława (2012)
- Miasto 44 (2014)

=== Air warfare in Europe (1939–1945) ===
- I Wanted Wings (1941)
- A Yank in the R.A.F. (1941)
- Keep 'Em Flying (1941)
- One of Our Aircraft Is Missing (1942)
- Captains of the Clouds (1942)
- Fighter Squadron (1948)
- Command Decision (1948)
- Twelve O'Clock High (1949), the lives of 8th Air Force bomber crews in England
- Angels One Five (1952)
- The Dam Busters (1954), depiction of the RAF 1943 raid
- Reach for the Sky (1956), biopic of RAF hero Douglas Bader
- Der Stern von Afrika (1957)
- The One That Got Away (1957), true story of the only Luftwaffe pilot to escape captivity in Britain and return to Germany
- The War Lover (1962)
- 633 Squadron (1963)
- Nebeští jezdci (1968)
- Mosquito Squadron (1969)
- The Thousand Plane Raid (1969)
- Battle of Britain (1969)
- Eagles Over London (1970)
- Catch-22 (1970), American B-25 crewmen trying to survive the war in Italy
- Hanover Street (1979)
- Hope and Glory (1987)
- Piece of Cake TV series (1988), RAF pilots in the Battle of Britain
- Memphis Belle (1990), final mission of a B-17 crew
- The Tuskegee Airmen (1995), depiction of the all-black 99th Pursuit Squadron
- Dark Blue World (2001), Czech pilots in the Battle of Britain
- Dresden (2006 film) (2006)
- Fortress (2012 film) (2012)
- Red Tails (2012), the story of the Tuskegee Airmen
- Hurricane (2018)
- Lancaster Skies (2019)
- Catch-22 (miniseries) (2019)
- Masters of the Air (2024), TV series
- Blitz (2024)

=== Battle of the Atlantic (1939–1945) ===
- The Long Voyage Home (1940)
- 49th Parallel (1941)
- In the Navy (1941)
- Ships with Wings (1941)
- In Which We Serve (1942)
- The Navy Comes Through (1942)
- Action in the North Atlantic (1943), depiction of the Battle of the Atlantic
- Crash Dive (1943)
- San Demetrio London (1943)
- Submarine Base (1943)
- We Dive at Dawn (1943)
- Corvette K-225 (1944)
- The Damned (1947 film) (1947)
- Fighting Coast Guard (1951)
- The Cruel Sea (1953)
- Above Us the Waves (1955)
- Battle of the River Plate (1956), 1939 pursuit of the Graf Spee
- The Enemy Below (1957), US Navy destroyer engages a German U-boat
- U 47 – Kapitänleutnant Prien (1958)
- Under Ten Flags (1960)
- Sink the Bismarck (1960), depiction of the hunt for the Bismark
- Mystery Submarine (1963)
- Morituri (1965)
- Submarine X-1 (1968)
- Murphy's War (1971)
- Das Boot (1981), story of a German U-Boat crew
- Das letzte U-Boot (1990)
- U-571 (2000), entirely fictional depiction of mission to recover Enigma machine from U-Boat
- In Enemy Hands (2004)
- The Sinking of the Laconia (2011)
- Das Boot (TV series) (2018)
- Torpedo (2019 film) (2019)
- Greyhound (2020)

=== Finnish war (1939–1944) ===
- Ski Patrol (1940)
- The Unknown Soldier (The Unknown Soldier) (1955)
- Sissit (1963)
- Tuntematon Sotilas (The Unknown Soldier) (1985)
- Talvisota (1989) (available on YouTube with subtitles)
- Rukajärven tie (Ambush) (1999)
- Käki (The Cuckoo) (2002)
- Beyond the Front Line (2004)
- Lupaus (Promise) (2005)
- Fire and Ice: The Winter War of Finland and Russia (2006) (Documentary)
- Tali-Ihantala 1944 (2007)
- Wildeye (2015)
- The Unknown Soldier (The Unknown Soldier) (2017)
- Sisu (2022)

=== Norwegian Campaign (1940) ===
- Kampf um Norwegen – Feldzug 1940 (1940)
- Let George Do It! (1940)
- Commandos Strike at Dawn (1942)
- The Day Will Dawn (1942)
- They Raid by Night (1942)
- Edge of Darkness (1943 film) (1943)
- The Moon Is Down (1943)
- Courage of Lassie (1945)
- Englandsfarere (1946)
- Operation Swallow: The Battle for Heavy Water (1948)
- Operation Edelweiss (1954)
- Nine Lives (1957)
- The Heroes of Telemark (1965)
- Snow Treasure (1968)
- Under en steinhimmel (1974)
- The Last Lieutenant (1993)
- Max Manus (2008), Norwegian resistance hero
- Age of Heroes (2011)
- Into the White (2012)
- The Heavy Water War (2015)
- Kongens Nei (2016)
- Narvik (2022)

=== Battle of France (1940) ===
- Sieg im Westen (1941)
- Forbidden Games (1952)
- Dunkirk (1958)
- The Young Lions (1958)
- Weekend at Dunkirk (1964)
- Dunkirk (2004)
- Eighteen (2005)
- Le Grand Charles (2006)
- Atonement (2007)
- Het Bombardement (2012)
- Dunkirk (2017)
- Darkest Hour (2017)

=== French Resistance (1940–1944) ===
- Joan of Paris (1942)
- Reunion in France (1942)
- This Land Is Mine (film) (1943)
- The Cross of Lorraine (1943)
- Passage to Marseille (1944)
- To Have and Have Not (1944)
- La Bataille du rail (1945)
- A Friend Will Come Tonight (1946)
- Odette (film) (1950)
- When Willie Comes Marching Home (1950)
- A Man Escaped (1956)
- Carve Her Name With Pride (1958)
- Green Harvest (1959)
- The Cat Shows Her Claws (1960)
- The Train (1964)
- Shock Troops (1967)
- L'Armée des ombres (1969), depiction of the French Resistance
- Underground (1970)
- Le vieux fusil (1975)
- Affiche Rouge (1976)
- Charlotte Gray (2001)
- The Army of Crime (2009)
- 15 Lads (2011)
- Free Men (2011)
- Resistance (2019)

=== Dutch resistance (1940–1945) ===
- The Silver Fleet (1943)
- Betrayed (1954)
- Operation Amsterdam (1959)
- The Silent Raid (1962)
- Like Two Drops of Water (1963)
- Dirty Heroes (1967)
- Soldaat van Oranje (Soldier of Orange) (1977), Dutch resistance
- Pastorale 1943 (1978)
- De Fûke (2000)
- Resistance (2003)
- Black Book (2006), Dutch resistance
- Winter in Wartime (film) (2008)
- Return to the Hiding Place (2011)

=== Belgian resistance (1940–1944) ===
- Against the Wind (1948)
- Resistance (2003)
- Torpedo (2019 film) (2019)

=== Czechoslovak resistance (1939–1945) ===
- Anthropoid (2016)

=== Denmark in World War II (1940–1945) ===
- The Invisible Army (1945)
- Der kom en dag (1955)
- The Boys from St. Petri (1991)
- Miracle at Midnight (1998)
- Flame & Citron (2008), Danish resistance
- This Life (2012)
- April 9th (2015)

=== Axis occupation of Greece (1940–1944) ===
- Teleftaia apostoli (1950)
- They Who Dare (1954)
- Ill Met by Moonlight (1957)
- The Guns of Navarone (1961)
- Glory Sky (1963)
- The Naked Brigade (1965)
- Signs of Life (1968)
- I charavgi tis nikis (1971)
- Force 10 from Navarone (1978)
- Escape to Athena (1979)
- Mediterraneo (1991)
- Captain Corelli's Mandolin (2001), Italian occupation of Kefallonia, Greece
- Sword of Honour (2001 film) (2001) Battle of Crete
- The 11th Day: Crete 1941 (2005)

=== North African Campaign (1940–1943) ===
- Sundown (1941)
- Casablanca (1942)
- Sahara (1943)
- Nine Men (1943)
- Five Graves to Cairo (1943)
- The Way Ahead (1944)
- The Rats of Tobruk (1944)
- The Desert Fox (1951)
- Bright Victory (1951)
- The Desert Rats (1953)
- The Malta Story (1953)
- Folgore Division (1954)
- They Who Dare (1954)
- The Steel Bayonet (1957)
- Bitter Victory (1957)
- Der Stern von Afrika (1957)
- Hell Squad (1958)
- Ice-Cold in Alex (1958)
- Sea of Sand (1958)
- Desert Mice (1959)
- The Best of Enemies (1962)
- No Man Is an Island (1962)
- Tobruk (1967)
- Desert Commandos (1967)
- Commandos (1968)
- Play Dirty (1969)
- Desert Battle (1969)
- The Battle of El Alamein (1969)
- Patton (1970), depiction of the Battle of El Guettar and the campaigns of Patton
- Raid on Rommel (1971)
- The Greatest Battle (1978)
- The Big Red One (1980)
- A Man Called Sarge (1990), comedy involving the Second Battle of El Alamein
- El Alamein – The Line of Fire (2002)
- Tobruk (2008), Czech soldiers in the Tobruk campaign
- P-51 Dragon Fighter (2014)
- SAS: Rogue Heroes (2022) (TV Show) – first season

=== Pacific War (1941–1945) ===
- They Met in Bombay (1941)
- Wake Island (1942)
- The War at Sea from Hawaii to Malaya (1942)
- Air Force (1943) depiction of Attack on Pearl Harbor
- Destination Tokyo (1943)
- Wings Over the Pacific (1943)
- Aerial Gunner (1943)
- Bombardier (1943)
- Prisoner of Japan (1943)
- Guadalcanal Diary (1943), depiction of the Marines on Guadalcanal
- Gung Ho! (1943)
- The Purple Heart (1944)
- Kato hayabusa sento-tai (1944)
- The Fighting Sullivans (1944), story of the Sullivan brothers, all lost in the sinking of the USS Juneau
- The Fighting Seabees (1944)
- Wing and a Prayer (1944)
- Two-Man Submarine (1944)
- Marine Raiders (1944)
- Thirty Seconds Over Tokyo (1944), depiction of the Doolittle Raid and aftermath
- Pride of the Marines (1945)
- The Bamboo Blonde (1946)
- Jungle Patrol (1948)
- Sands of Iwo Jima (1949)
- Malaya (1949)
- Halls of Montezuma (1950)
- The Frogmen (1951)
- Flying Leathernecks (1951)
- Operation Pacific (1951)
- Flat Top (1952)
- Okinawa (1952)
- From Here to Eternity (1953), depiction of the Attack on Pearl Harbor
- Away All Boats (1956)
- Hellcats of the Navy (1957), movie starring Ronald Reagan and his wife, Nancy Davis
- Heaven Knows, Mr. Allison (1957)
- The Wings of Eagles (1957)
- In Love and War (1958)
- Run Silent, Run Deep (1958)
- The Naked and the Dead (1958)
- Tarawa Beachhead (1958)
- Battle of the Coral Sea (1959)
- Operation Petticoat (1959), comedy about a US Navy submarine
- Up Periscope (1959)
- Blood and Steel (1959)
- Hell to Eternity (1960)
- The Gallant Hours (1960)
- Battle of Blood Island (1960)
- Storm Over the Pacific (1960)
- Hum Dono (1961)
- The Outsider (1961), the story of Ira Hayes
- No Man Is an Island (1962)
- Attack Squadron! (1963)
- PT 109 (1963), the story of President Kennedy in WWII
- Operation Bikini (1963)
- Father Goose (1964), a Coastwatcher in the South Pacific protects a nun and her charges
- In Harm's Way (1965)
- None but the Brave (1965), US Marines and Japanese soldiers fight for possession of an island where they are marooned
- Beach Red (1967), US Marines storm a Japanese held island
- Hell in the Pacific (1968), Japanese and American castaways battle each other on a deserted island
- 36 Hours to Hell (1969)
- Too Late the Hero (1970), British troops on a mission in South Asia
- Tora! Tora! Tora! (1970), depiction of the Attack on Pearl Harbor
- Saigo no Tokkōtai (最後の特攻隊, The Last Kamikaze in English), (1970)
- Battle of Okinawa (1971)
- Lalkar (1972)
- Midway (1976), depiction of the Battle of Midway
- MacArthur (1977)
- 1941 (1979)
- The Imperial Navy (1981)
- Attack Force Z (1981), depiction of a commando raid involving Australian/New Zealand Z Special Unit
- The Highest Honour (1982)
- Grave of the Fireflies (1988)
- The Heroes (1989 miniseries)
- The Thin Red Line (1998), depiction of the US Army at the Battle of Guadalcanal
- Harry's War (1999), short film depiction of the brother of Reg Saunders
- Markova: Comfort Gay (2000)
- Pearl Harbor (2001), fictionalized account of the Pearl Harbor attack
- Windtalkers (2002), depiction of the Battle of Saipan
- Diwa (2002)
- Otoko-tachi no Yamato (2005)
- Netaji Subhas Chandra Bose: The Forgotten Hero (2005)
- Letters from Iwo Jima (2006), Japanese defenders of Iwo Jima
- Flags of Our Fathers (2006), story of the Iwo Jima flag raising
- Kokoda (2006), Australian troops in New Guinea
- Australia (2008) depiction of the Bombing of Darwin
- The Pacific (2010) depiction US Marines in the Pacific War
- Oba: The Last Samurai (2011)
- Canopy (2013)
- The Eternal Zero (2013)
- Little Boy (2015), United States home front during World War II
- In This Corner of the World (2016)
- USS Indianapolis: Men of Courage (2016)
- Hacksaw Ridge (2016)
- Midway (2019)
- The Boy and the Heron (2023)

=== Philippines campaign (1941–1942) and Philippines campaign (1944–1945) ===
- Remember Pearl Harbor (1942)
- Manila Calling (1942)
- Air Force (1943)
- Bataan (1943)
- Corregidor (1943)
- So Proudly We Hail! (1943) Nurses in the Philippines
- Cry "Havoc" (1943) Nurses in the Philippines
- Ano hata o ute (1944)
- Back to Bataan (1945)
- They Were Expendable (1945)
- Death March (1946)
- Mapuputing Kamay (1950)
- American Guerrilla in the Philippines (1950)
- I Was an American Spy (1951)
- Between Heaven and Hell (1956)
- Suicide Battalion (1958)
- Operation Petticoat (1959), comedy about a US Navy submarine
- Fires on the Plain (1959), Japanese troops in the Philippines 1945
- Surrender – Hell! (1960)
- Battle at Bloody Beach (1961)
- The Steel Claw (1961)
- Lost Battalion (1962)
- Cry of Battle (1963)
- Mga Kanyon ng Corregidor (1964)
- Guerillas in Pink Lace (1964)
- The Walls of Hell (1964)
- Back Door to Hell (1964)
- The Ravagers (1965)
- Ambush Bay (1966)
- Manila, Open City (1968)
- Warkill (1968)
- Escape to Mindanao (1968)
- Dugo at Pag Ibig sa Kapirasiong Lupa (1975)
- Tatlong Taong Walang Diyos (1976)
- MacArthur (1977)
- Aguila (1980)
- Oro, Plata, Mata (1982)
- Women of Valor (1986)
- Gatas... sa dibdib ng kaaway (2001)
- Yamashita: The Tiger's Treasure (2001)
- Alab ng Lahi (2003)
- Panaghoy sa Suba (2004)
- Aishite Imasu 1941: Mahal Kita (2004)
- The Great Raid (2005)
- Fires on the Plain (2014)

=== The Jews in WW2 (1941–1945) ===
- Ostatni etap (1948)
- Lang ist der Weg (1949)
- Maître après Dieu (1951)
- Forbidden Games (1952), depiction of the Battle of France
- The Diary of Anne Frank (1959)
- The Ninth Circle (1960), depiction of Croatian Ustaše death camps
- The Diary of Anne Frank (1967)
- The Diary of Anne Frank (1980)
- Playing for Time (1980)
- The Pawnbroker (1984)
- Wallenberg: A Hero's Story (1985)
- Elysium (1986)
- Jona che visse nella balena (1993)
- Schindler's List (1993), German businessman helps save Jewish lives during the Holocaust
- Life is Beautiful (1997), an Italian Jew faces the Holocaust
- Jakob the Liar (1999), The movie is set in 1944 in a ghetto in German-occupied Poland during the Holocaust
- Daleko od okna (2000)
- Uprising (2001)
- The Pianist (2002), a Jewish man hides in Warsaw to escape the Holocaust
- The Boys of Buchenwald (2002)
- Forest of the Gods (2005)
- Un secret (2007)
- In Darkness (2011)
- Mein bester Feind (2011)
- Süskind (2012)
- The Third Half (2013)
- Grüningers Fall (2014)
- Saul fia (2015)
- Where Is Anne Frank (2021)
- Valiant Hearts (2021)

=== Eastern Front (1941–1945) ===
- The North Star (1943)
- T-9 Submarine («Подводная лодка Т-9» in Russian) (1943)
- Ukraine in Flames (1943), documentary
- The Boy from Stalingrad (1943), American film, depicts the Battle of Stalingrad from the Soviet perspective
- Song of Russia (1944)
- Days of Glory (1944)
- It Happened in the Donbass (1945)
- Secret Agent (1947)
- The Third Blow (1948)
- The Battle of Stalingrad (1949), depiction of the Battle of Stalingrad from the Soviet perspective
- The Fall of Berlin (1950)
- The Lights of Baku (1950)
- Far from Moscow (1951)
- The Immortal Garrison (1956)
- Soldiers («Солдаты» in Russian), depiction of the Battle of Stalingrad from the Soviet perspective
- The Cranes Are Flying (1957)
- A Time to Love and a Time to Die (1958)
- Stalingrad: Dogs, Do You Want to Live Forever? (1959), depiction of the Battle of Stalingrad from the German perspective
- Ballad of a Soldier (1959) Russian infantryman travels home on leave
- My Name is Ivan (1963) («Иваново детство» in Russia)
- The Alive and the Dead («Живые и мёртвые» in Russian) (1964)
- Father of a Soldier (1964)
- Attack and Retreat (1965), Italian troops on the Eastern Front
- The Lark (1965 film) (1965)
- Czterej pancerni i pies (1966–1970) TV series, crew of a Polish T-34 tank is fighting against the Germans
- I Was Nineteen (1968), the last days of WW2 told from the perspective of a young German serving in the Red Army
- The Liberation (1971)
- The Dawns Here Are Quiet (1972)
- Hot Snow (film) (1972)
- Only Old Men Are Going to Battle (1973)
- Blockade (1975–78) Siege of Leningrad
- They Fought for Their Country (1975) («Они сражались за родину" in Russia)
- Twenty Days Without War (1976)
- Cross of Iron (1977), German infantrymen on the Eastern Front
- The Unknown War (1978), documentary series
- Siberiade (1979)
- The Bunker (1980 television film), Hitler's final days
- Night Witches In The Sky (1981)
- Battle of Moscow (1985)
- Come and See (1985), German atrocities in Russia
- The Misfit Brigade (1987), war story of the 27th Panzers, Hitler's heavy-duty combat regiment composed of prisoners
- Stalingrad (1989), Soviet-American coproduction, depicts the Battle of Stalingrad from the Soviet perspective
- General (1992), biopic on General Alexander Gorbatov
- Stalingrad (1993), depiction of the Battle of Stalingrad from the German perspective
- Enemy at the Gates (2001), depiction of the Battle of Stalingrad
- The Star (2002) («Звезда» in Russian)
- The Cadets (2004 TV series)
- On the Nameless Height (2004 TV series)
- Shtrafbat (2004 TV miniseries)
- Downfall (2004) (Der Untergang), the final 10 days of Hitler and his rule over the Third Reich
- Major Pugachev's Final Battle (2005) («Последний бой майора Пугачёва» in Russian)
- The Island (2006)
- Ühe metsa pojad (2007)
- Defiance (2008), Jewish partisans in Belarus
- Apostol (TV series) («The Apostle») (2008)
- In june '41(2008)
- A Woman in Berlin (2008)
- 1941 (2009 TV)
- Attack on Leningrad (2009)
- The Priest (2009)
- First Squad: The Moment of Truth (2009)
- The Brest Fortress (2010, Russian), opening stages of Operation Barbarossa in 1941
- Burnt by the Sun 2 (2010)
- Deliver at all cost (2011) («Доставить любой ценой» in Russian)
- Frozen Silence (2011) Spanish Blue Division
- In the Fog (2012)
- White Tiger (2012)
- Spy (2012)
- Night Swallows (2012) Ночные Ласточки Russian TV series about Night Witches
- Frankenstein's Army (2013)
- Generation War (2013)
- Stalingrad (2013), depiction of the Battle of Stalingrad from the Soviet perspective
- 28 panfilovtsev (2015), twenty-eight soldiers of the Red Army's 316th Rifle Division stopped the advance on Moscow of a column of fifty-four German tanks of the 11th Panzer Division
- Battle for Sevastopol (2015)
- The Dawns Here Are Quiet (2015)
- 1944 (2015) Estonia in 1944
- Indestructible (2018 film), («Несокрушимый» in Russian)
- We won't say goodbye (2018), («Прощаться не будем» in Russian)
- Saving Leningrad (2019)
- T-34 (2019)
- Rzhev (film) (2019)
- The Last Frontier (2020)
- The Red Ghost (2021)
- Topor 1943 (2021)

=== World War II in Yugoslavia (1941–1945) ===
- Chetniks! The Fighting Guerrillas (1943)
- Undercover (1943), Yugoslav guerrilla movement in German-occupied Yugoslavia loosely based on the Chetnik resistance movement
- In the mountains of Yugoslavia (1946), first post-war film to be filmed in Yugoslavia, a Soviet-Yugoslav coproduction
- Daleko je sunce (1953), Yugoslav Partisans
- Šolaja (1955), Serb rebellion against the genocide committed by the Croatian Ustaše
- Campo mamula (1959), German POW camp in Montenegro
- Vetar je stao pred zoru (1959), Partisan saboteurs in German-occupied Belgrade
- X-25 javlja (1960), Partisan spy infiltrates a German HQ
- The Ninth Circle (1960), depiction of Croatian Ustaše death camp based on the Jasenovac concentration camp
- Kapetan Leši (1960), Yugoslav Partisans in German-occupied areas of Kosovo
- Kozara (1962), Yugoslav Partisans in battle for Kozara mountain
- Prozvan je i V-3 (1962), Wehrmacht troops massacre civilians, including school children, in Kragujevac, Serbia
- Desant na Drvar (1963), Yugoslav Partisans in charge of protecting Josip Broz Tito face a full-scale airborne assault by the SS paratroopers
- Nikoletina Bursać (1964), partisan machine-gunner, a tough guy with a gentle heart
- The Secret Invasion (1964), British intelligence sends five convicted criminals into Yugoslavia to rescue an Italian General and convince him to turn his troops against the occupying Nazi forces
- The Yellow Rolls-Royce (1964), last part of the movie is set during the Nazi invasion of Yugoslavia and stars Omar Sharif as a Yugoslav Partisan
- Čovek iz hrastove šume (1965), a Chetnik executioner finds his human side after falling in love with a partisan girl, however she betrays him
- Provereno nema mina (1965), a Soviet-Yugoslav co-production set just after the liberation of Belgrade
- Three (1965)
- Pogled u zjenicu sunca (1966), a gritty story of a small group of partisans left behind in the mountains, who face cold, starvation, typhus and, ultimately, hallucinations, and a young partisan who volunteered to retrieve them
- Black Birds (1967), Croatian Ustaše plan to execute prisoners from the Stara Gradiška concentration camp and Partisans try to stop them
- Bomb at 10:10 (1967)
- Koraci kroz magle (1967), while wounded partisans retreat through foggy marshlands, Germans quietly start a manhunt while anticipating their physical and mental exhaustion
- Praznik (1967), Chetniks rescue downed US pilots, and soon face a demand by collaborationist authorities to hand them over
- Adriatic Sea of Fire (1968), inspired by a true story of two naval officers of the defeated Royal Yugoslav Army, Milan Spasić and Sergej Mašera, who sacrificed themselves and their vessel to stop the German-Italian advance
- Lelejska gora (1968), Partisans in Montenegro
- Vuk sa Prokletija (1968), ethnic Albanians in Italian-occupied areas of Kosovo
- The Battle of Neretva (1969), Academy Award-nominated movie about the Yugoslav Partisans's epic battle by the Neretva river
- The Fifth Day of Peace (1969)
- Krvava bajka (1969), Wehrmacht troops massacre civilians, including school children, in Kragujevac, Serbia
- Kuda idu divlje svinje (1971 TV series), two groups of smugglers clash in Croatia during the Ustaše regime
- Walter Defends Sarajevo (1972), fictionalized story of a Yugoslav war hero Vladimir Perić Valter
- Istrel (1972), Yugoslav Partisans fight against Bulgarian occupation in Macedonia
- The Battle of Sutjeska (1973), Yugoslav Partisans and their battle against Germans by the Sutjeska river
- Otpisani (1974 TV series), Partisan saboteurs in German-occupied Belgrade
- The Republic of Užice (1974), Partisans establish a liberated territory in and around a small Serbian town of Užice, in autumn of 1941
- Hell River (1974), Partisans try to raid a boat transporting Jews to a concentration camp.
- Die Brücke von Zupanja (1975), a West German B-movie about Wehrmacht's gradual retreat in face of Yugoslav Partisan offensive in 1944
- Salaš u Malom Ritu (1975 TV series), children face Nazi atrocities in a small village in Serbia
- Vrhovi Zelengore (1976), Yugoslav Partisans and their battle against Germans by the Sutjeska river
- Battle for the Railway (1978), a duel between Partisans on one side, and the joint force of German Wehrmacht and Bulgarian troops on the other – over the railway in southern Serbia and Macedonia
- Force Ten from Navarone (1978), OSS mission in Yugoslavia
- Occupation in 26 Pictures (1978), depiction of Croatian Ustaše atrocities in Dalmatia
- Boško Buha (1979), a young Yugoslav Partisan who turned to be one of the greatest icons of World War II in the former Yugoslavia
- Partizanska eskadrila (1979), heavily fictionalized story of the first Yugoslav Partisan air force unit
- Pakleni otok (1979), Germans attempt to take control over Dalmatia after Italians surrender; they immediately clash with partisans on a small island
- See You in the Next War (1980), German-occupied Slovenia
- The Fall of Italy (1981), Partisans in Dalmatia face chaos in the aftermath of Italian surrender
- Nepokoreni grad (1981 TV series), depiction of Croatian Ustaše terror campaign, including the Kerestinec prison
- 13. jul (1982), Yugoslav Partisans in Montenegro
- Balkan Express (1983), petty criminals try to make some money under the disguise of musical band in Nazi-occupied Serbia
- Great Transport (1983), thousand of Partisans march to comrades' aid
- Igmanski marš (1983), Partisans face a devastating march across Igman mountain
- The End of the War (1984), at the end of World War II, a Serbian man takes his son to search for and kill five members of the Croatian Ustaše militia who tortured and killed his wife
- A Youth Orchestra (1985)
- Odlazak ratnika, povratak maršala (1986), TV series
- Lager Niš (1987), Nazi death camp in Niš, Serbia
- Braća po materi (1988), depiction of Croatian Ustaše atrocities, told through the story of two half-brothers, a Croat and a Serb
- That Summer of White Roses (1989)
- Silent Gunpowder (1990), story of a Serbian village in the mountains of Bosnia and its villagers who found themselves divided along two opposing ideological lines
- Underground (1995), epic story spanning from Nazi invasion of Yugoslavia to Yugoslav wars of the 1990s
- The Border (1996), Italian occupation of Dalmatia
- The Dagger (1999), story of hatred and violence in Bosnia, spanning from World War Two to the Bosnian War
- Long Dark Night (2004), story of two friends, one Partisan and the other one Ustaša, in Ustaše-controlled Croatia
- Badnje veče 1943 (2007 TV), story of two brothers in rival resistance groups, one Partisan, other a Chetnik, who come together for a family meeting
- How I Was Stolen by the Germans (2011)
- Ravna Gora (2013 TV series), story of Serbian Chetnik resistance fighters
- The Liberation of Skopje (2016), German-Bulgarian occupation of Macedonia
- The Diary of Diana B. (2019), Austrian-born humanitarian Diana Budisavljević risks her life by saving Serbian children from Ustaše-controlled Stara Gradiška concentration camp.
- Dara of Jasenovac (2020), story of a young Bosnian Serb girl held prisoner in the Ustaše-controlled Jasenovac concentration camp.

=== Burma Campaign (1942–1945) ===
- Burma Convoy (1941)
- A Yank on the Burma Road (1942)
- Bombs Over Burma (1942)
- Rookies in Burma (1943)
- Calling Blighty series (1944–46)
- Objective Burma (1945)
- The Hasty Heart (1949)
- Francis (1950)
- The Purple Plain (1954)
- The Burmese Harp (1956)
- The Wind Cannot Read (1958)
- Yesterday's Enemy (1959)
- Never So Few (1959)
- The Long and the Short and the Tall (1961)
- Operation Bottleneck (1961) US paratroopers in Burma
- Merrill's Marauders (1962), American troops behind Japanese lines in Burma
- The Burmese Harp (1985)
- Rangoon (2017)

=== Italian Campaign (1943–1945) ===
- The Story of G.I. Joe (1945), biopic of correspondent Ernie Pyle
- A Walk In The Sun (1945), American platoon at the 1943 Salerno landing
- Rome, Open City (1945)
- Paisan (1946)
- Go for Broke! (1951)
- Force of Arms (1951)
- Eight Iron Men (1952)
- Darby's Rangers (1958)
- The Green Devils of Monte Cassino (1958)
- Tank Commandos (1959)
- Paratroop Command (1959)
- The Two Colonels (1962), B&W comedy about Italian and British troops facing off on the Greek–Albanian border in 1943
- What Did You Do in the War, Daddy? (1966)
- War Italian Style (1966)
- Anzio (1968), depiction of the Battle of Anzio
- Mussolini: Ultimo atto (Mussolini: The Last Four Days) (1974)
- Last Days of Mussolini (1977)
- The Inglorious Bastards (1977)
- The Night of the Shooting Stars (1982)
- The Fallen (2004)
- Only the Brave (2005), depiction of 100th Infantry Battalion
- Miracle at St. Anna (2008)
- Little Iron Men (2008), depiction of the 442nd Infantry Regiment
- Captain America: The First Avenger (2011)
- Road 47 (2013) Brazilian Expeditionary Force
- SAS: Rogue Heroes (2022) (TV Show) – second season

=== Italian resistance movement (1943–1945) ===
- Rome, Open City (1945)
- Attention! Bandits! (1951)
- Conspiracy of Hearts (1960)
- Warriors Five (1960)
- The Four Days of Naples (1962)
- The Seven Cervi Brothers (1967)
- Salt in the Wound (1969)
- The Secret of Santa Vittoria (1969)
- Corbari (1970)
- Hornets' Nest (1970)
- Massacre in Rome (1973)
- Little Teachers (1998)
- The Man Who Will Come (2009), about the Marzabotto massacre

=== Western Front (1944–1945) ===
- Hitler--Dead or Alive (1942)
- Went the Day Well? (1942)
- Battleground (1949), 101st Airborne Division at Bastogne
- Breakthrough (1950) 1st Infantry Division in France
- They Were Not Divided (1950)
- Decision Before Dawn (1951), German spies working with the Allies in 1945
- The Tanks are Coming (1951)
- The Red Ball Express (1952) Military truck drivers kept the Allied armies supplied in Europe during World War II Starring Sidney Poitier
- Silent Raiders (1954)
- 08/15 (1954)
- - Part two (1955)
- - Back home (1955)
- To Hell and Back (1955), story of Audie Murphy
- Attack! (1956), American squad in the Battle of the Bulge
- D-Day the Sixth of June (1956)
- Screaming Eagles (film) (1956)
- I Was Monty's Double (1958)
- The Bridge (Die Brücke) (1959), teenage German soldiers defend a bridge in 1945
- Ski Troop Attack (1960)
- Hell Is for Heroes (1962), an American squad faces the Siegfried Line
- The Longest Day (1962), depiction of the Battle of Normandy
- Battle of the Bulge (1965), depiction of the Battle of the Bulge
- Is Paris Burning? (1966), depiction of the Liberation of Paris
- Attack on the Iron Coast (1967)
- The Dirty Dozen (1967), American Army criminals sent on a pre D-Day mission
- The Devil's Brigade (1968), story of the 1st Special Service Force
- Castle Keep (1969)
- The Bridge at Remagen (1969), depiction of the 1945 battle
- Black Brigade (1970)
- Kelly's Heroes (1970)
- A Bridge Too Far (1977), depiction of the Battle of Arnhem/Operation Market Garden
- The Big Red One (1980), follows a squad of the 1st Infantry Division from 1942 to 1945
- A Midnight Clear (1992), American squad in the Battle of the Bulge
- Dieppe (1993) (television film) – by Canadian Broadcasting Corporation (CBC), depiction of the Dieppe raid
- Saving Private Ryan (1998), depiction of the Battle of Normandy
- When Trumpets Fade (1998), depiction of the Battle of Hurtgen Forest
- Band of Brothers (2001 TV miniseries), the story of E Company, 506th of the 101st Airborne
- Silent Night (2002), American and German soldiers come together (2003)
- Saints and Soldiers (2003)
- Ike: Countdown to D-Day (2004)
- Days of Glory (2006), North African soldiers in the French Army
- S.S. Doomtrooper (2006)
- Reign of the Gargoyles (2007)
- Die Brucke (2008) (2008)
- Fist of the Reich (2010)
- Rommel (film) (2012)
- Fury (2014)
- The Monuments Men (2014)
- Churchill (film) (2017), The untold story of D-Day
- Werewolves of the Third Reich (2017)
- The Catcher Was a Spy (2018)
- Overlord (2018)
- Jojo Rabbit (2019)
- The Forgotten Battle (2020)

=== Prisoner of war ===
- The Cross of Lorraine (1943)
- The Captive Heart (1946)
- The Wooden Horse (1950)
- Stalag 17 (1953), American POWS stage an escape
- The Colditz Story (1954)
- The Bridge on the River Kwai (1957), Commonwealth prisoners of the Japanese build a bridge
- Danger Within (1958)
- The Cow and I (1959)
- The Elusive Corporal (1962)
- The Great Escape (1963), depiction of the 1943 allied escape from Stalg Luft III
- The Train (1964)
- King Rat (film) (1965)
- Von Ryan's Express (1965), Allied POWs stage an escape from a train in Italy
- Hogan's Heroes (1965–1971), Allied POWS make fools of the Germans on a weekly basis
- The McKenzie Break (1970), German POWs stage a breakout
- Escape to Victory (1981), Allied POWS play soccer(football) against their German captors
- Merry Christmas, Mr. Lawrence (1983), British POWS in a Japanese camp
- Escape from Sobibor (1987), depiction of 1943 breakout from Sobibor death camp
- Empire of the Sun (1987), a young British boy in a Japanese internment camp
- Prisoners of the Sun (1990)
- Paradise Road (1997)
- As Far as My Feet Will Carry Me (2001), German POW escaping a gulag
- To End All Wars (2001), British POWS in Japanese captivity
- Hart's War (2002), American POWS in a German camp hold a murder trial
- The Great Raid (2005), depiction of the 1945 Cabanatuan raid to free US prisoners of war
- Katyń (2007), depiction of the Katyn massacre
- Broken Sun (2008), loosely based on the Cowra breakout
- The Railway Man (2013)
- Unbroken (2014)

=== Spy fiction in WW2 ===
- Confessions of a Nazi Spy (1939)
- Foreign Correspondent (1940)
- Night Train to Munich (1940)
- Man Hunt (1941)
- Saboteur (1942)
- Let's Get Tough! (1942)
- Hitler--Dead or Alive (1942), Propaganda piece about a fictional assassination of Hitler.
- Casablanca (1942)
- Submarine Alert (1943)
- First Yank into Tokyo (1945)
- O.S.S. (1946)
- 13 Rue Madeleine (1947)
- Ill Met By Moonlight (1957)
- Battle of the V-1 (1958)
- Atentát (1964), depiction of the Operation Anthropoid
- 36 Hours (1965)
- Operation Crossbow (1965)
- Where Eagles Dare (1969)
- Seventeen Moments of Spring (1973 Soviet TV mini series) («Семнадцать мгновений весны» in Russia)
- Operation Daybreak (1975)
- The Eagle Has Landed (1976), German paratroopers attempt to kidnap Winston Churchill
- The Sea Wolves (1980), British agents attack German shipping in the Indian Ocean
- Shining Through (1992)
- Female Agents (2008)
- Inglourious Basterds (2009)
- Gränsen (2011), Swedish film depicting Swedish insurgencies into occupied Norway
- The Imitation Game (2014), dramatization of Alan Turing's codebreaking efforts
- Allied (2016)
- Churchill's Secret Agents: The New Recruits (2018)
- Operation Mincemeat (2021)
- The Ministry of Ungentlemanly Warfare (2024)

== Ecuadorian–Peruvian War (1941–1942) ==
- Open Wound ("Mono con gallinas" in Spanish) (2013)

== See also ==
- List of war films and TV specials
