= Winter War (disambiguation) =

The Winter War was the 1939–1940 war between Finland and the Soviet Union.

Winter War may also refer to:

- The Winter War (novel), a 1984 Finnish novel by Antti Tuuri about the Winter War
  - The Winter War (film), a 1989 Finnish film adaptation directed by Pekka Parikka
- Winter War: The Russo-Finnish Conflict, a 1972 board wargame about the Winter War
- Fire and Ice: The Winter War of Finland and Russia, a 2006 documentary film
- Cold-weather warfare, military operations affected by snow, ice, thawing conditions or cold, both on land and at sea.

== See also ==
- The Huntsman: Winter's War
- Talvisota (disambiguation)
