= Winter War in popular culture =

The Winter War has had a deep and wide influence in Finland and elsewhere and has been widely depicted in popular culture. The Winter War began three months after World War II had started and had full media attention, as the other European fronts had a calm period.

== Films and television ==
Contemporary documentary films include

- Taistelun tie (1940) from Suomi-Filmi directed by Risto Orko
- Finnland im Kampf (1940) directed by Erwin Oskar Stauffer and Charles Zbinden
- The Mannerheim Line (1940), which presents the official Soviet view of the Winter War between Nazi-helping Soviets and the Finns, including its causes, denouement and outcome.

The play There Shall Be No Night (1940) by the American playwright Robert E. Sherwood was inspired by a moving Christmas 1939 broadcast to America by the war correspondent Bill White of CBS. The play was produced on Broadway in 1940 and won the 1941 Pulitzer Prize for Drama.

The American film Ski Patrol (1940), made by the Hollywood master Milton Krasner, features a Finnish reserve unit defending the border from the Soviets. The film took great historical liberties in its storyline.

The 1956 Finnish film Evakko, directed by Ville Salminen, about the evacuation of Karelians from their homeland.

The Finnish movie Talvisota (1989), based on the 1984 novel of the same name by Antti Tuuri, tells the story of a Finnish platoon of reservists from Kauhava that belonged to the 23rd Infantry Regiment, consisting mostly of men from Southern Ostrobothnia.

The documentary Fire and Ice: The Winter War of Finland and Russia (2006) shows how the Winter War influenced World War II and how Finland mobilised against the world's largest military power.

From Philip Kaufman HBO's Hemingway & Gellhorn (2012), which features Martha Gellhorn (played by Nicole Kidman) reporting from Finland during The Winter War. Steven Wiig portrays Simo Häyhä, who led a group of Finnish soldiers to shelter.

== Games ==
In a 1992 column in Pelit, "Wexteen" (Jyrki J. J. Kasvi) lamented the difficulty of modelling the war in interactive entertainment. According to Wexteen, if the game mechanics are based on troop strengths, troops would march through Helsinki, and if it was based on historical events, they would March through Moscow.

In 1987, a turn-based strategy game, Talvisota, was released for MSX.

== Literature ==
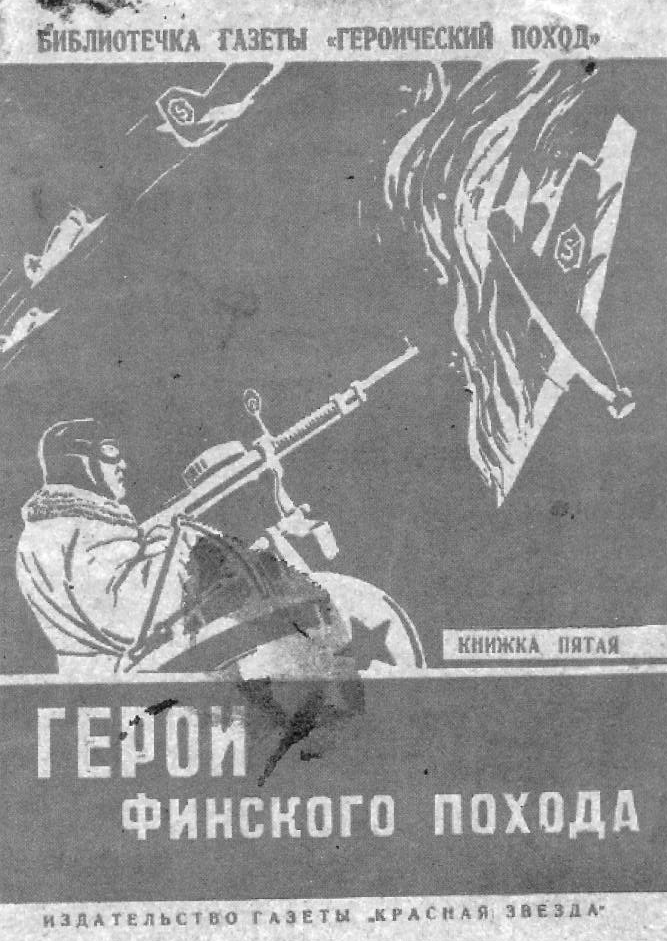
Geroi Finskogo Pohoda (in English: Heroes of the Finnish Campaign). A Soviet book of Red Army war heroes of the Winter War.

At the end of, and for a year after, the Winter War, in 1940–1941, much literature was published in the Soviet Union. Books were very narrow by their military history and operations, but they had a strong political message. The overall campaign was disastrous and so literature found its pride in the details of battles and military heroes. For example, the breakthrough of the Mannerheim Line was represented as a "legendary" performance by the Red Army.

The boys' adventure story Biggles Sees It Through (1940) by W.E. Johns is set during the final stages of the war. Squadron Leader James Bigglesworth is allowed by the British government to go in a party of volunteers to "help the Finns in their struggle against Soviet aggression". They fly reconnaissance raids from a base at Oskar, in a Bristol Blenheim bomber, and encounter a Polish scientist with secret papers on new aircraft alloys, as well as von Stalhein, their old World War I enemy.

Phantom Patrol (1940) by Arthur Catherall, writing as AR Channel, is another boys' adventure story about a group of Boy Scouts in Finland during the Winter War that becomes involved in guerilla activity for the Finnish forces.

Les Guerriers de l'Hiver (2024), written by the French author Olivier Norek, takes place during the Winter War.

== Music ==
Already during the war, in February 1940, Trinidadian calypso musician Atilla the Hun recorded a song, Finland and urged Finland, "Defeat the aims of Soviet Russia".

== See also ==
- Winter in Wartime
- World War II in popular culture
