= The Case for Latvia =

2008 book by Jukka Rislakki

- Book cover of the 2nd expanded edition released in 2014
- Author: Jukka Rislakki
- Original title: Tapaus Latvia
- Translator: Richard Impola
- Language: English
- Series: On the Boundary of Two Worlds
- Publisher: Rodopi
- Publication date: 2008; 2014 (expanded 2nd edition)
- Publication place: Finland
- Pages: 296
- ISBN: 978-90-420-2424-3
- OCLC: 233026199

The Case for Latvia. Disinformation Campaigns Against a Small Nation. Fourteen Hard Questions and Straight Answers about a Baltic Country is a non-fiction book on the history of Latvia by the awarded Finnish author Jukka Rislakki. The book was first published 2007 in the Finnish language. It was translated to English by Richard Impola and published by the Rodopi publishing house 2008. An expanded second edition was published January 2014. The Case for Latvia is part of the series On the Boundary of Two Worlds: Identity, Freedom, and Moral Imagination in the Baltics.

== Languages and editions ==
Book cover of the original edition released in 2008

The Case for Latvia was first published 2007 in the Finnish language with the title "Tapaus Latvia. Pieni kansakunta disinformaatiokampanjan kohteena", and has since then also been published in the Latvian language with the title: "Maldināšana: Latvijas gadījums" (2008), and in the Russian language with the title: "Манипуляции фактами: латвийский вариант" (2011). The English version, translated from Finnish by Richard Impola, was published by the Rodopi publishing house 2008, and an expanded second edition was published January 2014.

== Cross of Recognition ==
On 4 May 2009, the day of restoration of independence of the Republic of Latvia, the author was awarded the Latvian Cross of Recognition for "selfless promotion of the Latvian image abroad and national patriotic education of youth". The Case for Latvia is the only book by Jukka Rislakki about Latvia, that has been translated to English.

== Reception ==
The Latvian language version of The Case for Latvia was reviewed by the Delfi web portal. The review comments on some of the points given in the book: "The analyses [of the book] also helps to understand, why the small and militarily weak Latvia in different surveys, for so long has been looked upon as Russia's enemy number one", and 'The Case for Latvia is mainly written for readers in the USA, even though Latvian readers may find new and interesting news".

The Case for Latvia was reviewed by two Latvian American scholars in the Latvian language magazine Jaunā Gaita. Gundars Ķeniņš-Kings (1926–2015), dean of School of Business at the Pacific Lutheran University, and Aija Veldre Beldavs (1941–2009), Doctor of Philosophy at the Folklore Archives at Indiana University. Beldavs initiates her review by the following comment: "It is easy to spread lies. After that, they folklorize, live their independent lives far from the truth. There is little help in facts that are rich in rebukes. Information wars are usually won by the strong and wealthy. In an unequal collision, small nations should be content with a purposeful, systematic, value-enhancing and creative approach to establishing evidence for rebuttal of lies".

Journal of Baltic Studies (Volume 40, issue no. 3) has published a review of The Case for Latvia by Lars Johannsen, Department of Political Science at Aarhus University, School of Business and Social Sciences; Violeta Davoliute, Vytautas Magnus University; Allan Sikk, School of Slavonic and East European Studies, University College London; Harvey L. Hix, University of Wyoming. The reviewer, Lars Johannsen is complimentary and describes the book over two pages. He starts by describing the book as a "spirited defense of Latvia", and says "The book is well written and will find its best audience among those who, like my students, have an interest in but little systematic knowledge of Latvia".

== Book cover ==
The image on the cover of the book for both editions is of a drawing by Benita Plezere, who was deported on 25 May 1949 from Latvia to Siberia, together with her family. She created drawings of their experiences during their travel, which she mailed as postcards to her grandmother. The drawings now are the property of the Museum of the Occupation of Latvia.
