= Talvisota =

Talvisota may refer to:

- The native Finnish name of the Winter War, a 1939–1940 war between Finland and the Soviet Union
- Talvisota or The Winter War, a 1989 Finnish film
- Talvisota, a novel by Antti Tuuri, basis for the film
- Talvisota: Icy Hell, a real-time action computer game
- "Talvisota", a song by Sabaton from The Art of War

== See also ==
- Suomen Talvisota 1939–1940, a Finnish rock band
- Winter War (disambiguation)
