= A Day in Ostrobothnia =

1982 novel by Antti Tuuri

- First edition
- Author: Antti Tuuri
- Original title: Pohjanmaa
- Language: Finnish
- Series: Ostrobothnia series
- Published: 1982
- Publisher: Otava
- Publication place: Finland
- Awards: Nordic Council's Literature Prize of 1985
- Followed by: The Winter War

A Day in Ostrobothnia (Finnish: Pohjanmaa) is a 1982 novel by Finnish author Antti Tuuri. It won the Nordic Council's Literature Prize in 1985.

The novel was adapted into a 1988 film Plainlands, directed by Pekka Parikka.
