= Irina Novikova =

Irina Novikova may refer to:

- Irina Novikova (swimmer) (born 1995), Russian swimmer, bronze medalist in 2011 World Junior Championships
- Irina B. Novikova (born 1975), Russian-American physicist
- Irina I. Novikova, Latvian academic, editor of book series On the Boundary of Two Worlds: Identity, Freedom, and Moral Imagination in the Baltics
