= Hong Lake =

Lake in Hubei, China

- Location in Hubei
- Location: Honghu, Hubei
- Coordinates: 29.847791°N 113.340454°E
- Basin countries: China
- Surface area: 348 km^{2} (134 sq mi)
- Settlements: Honghu

Hong Lake (Chinese: 洪湖; pinyin: Hóng Hú) is a 348 km^{2} (134 sq mi) freshwater lake in the municipal region of Jingzhou, in central China's Hubei province.

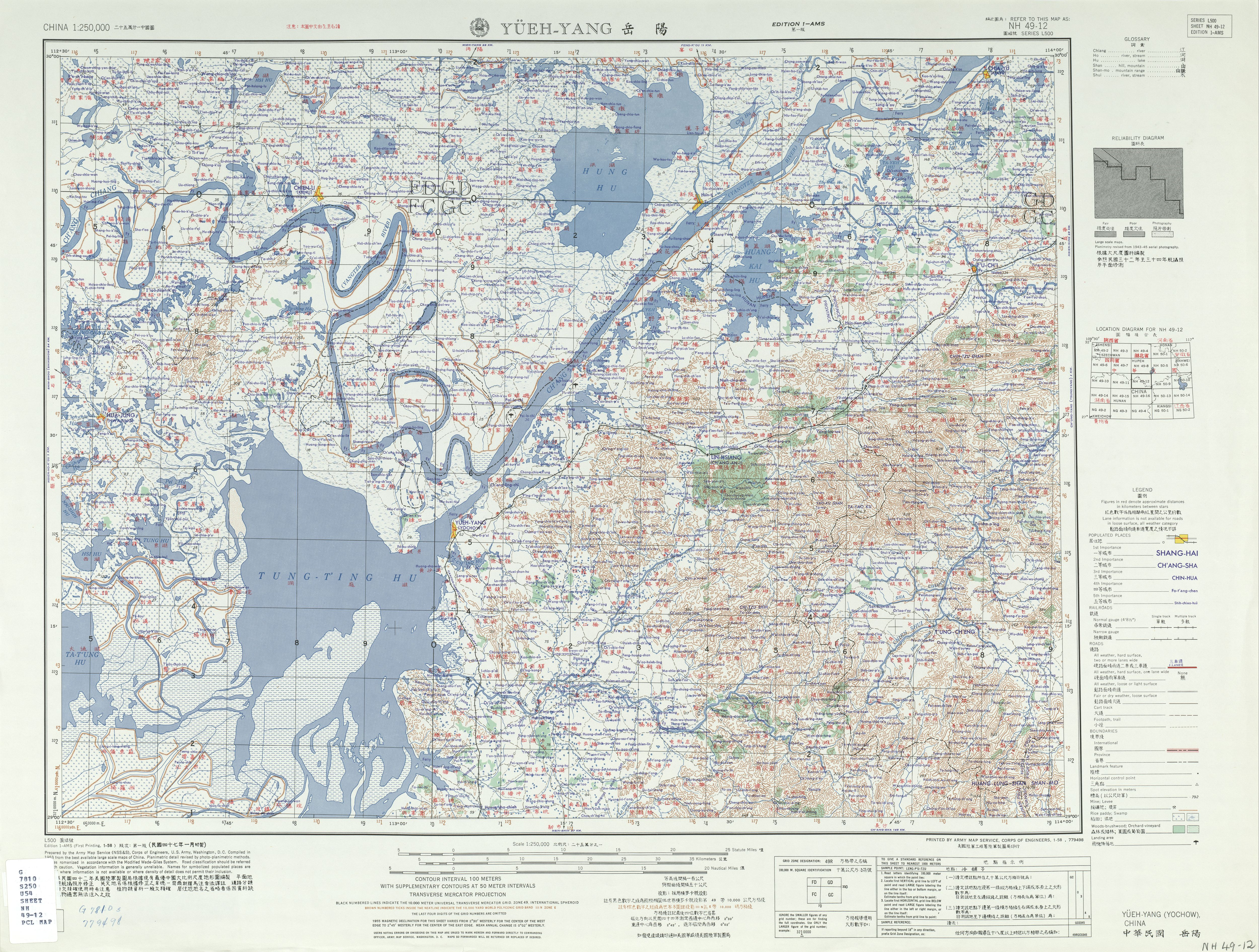
Map including Hong Lake (labeled as HUNG HU 洪湖) (1953)

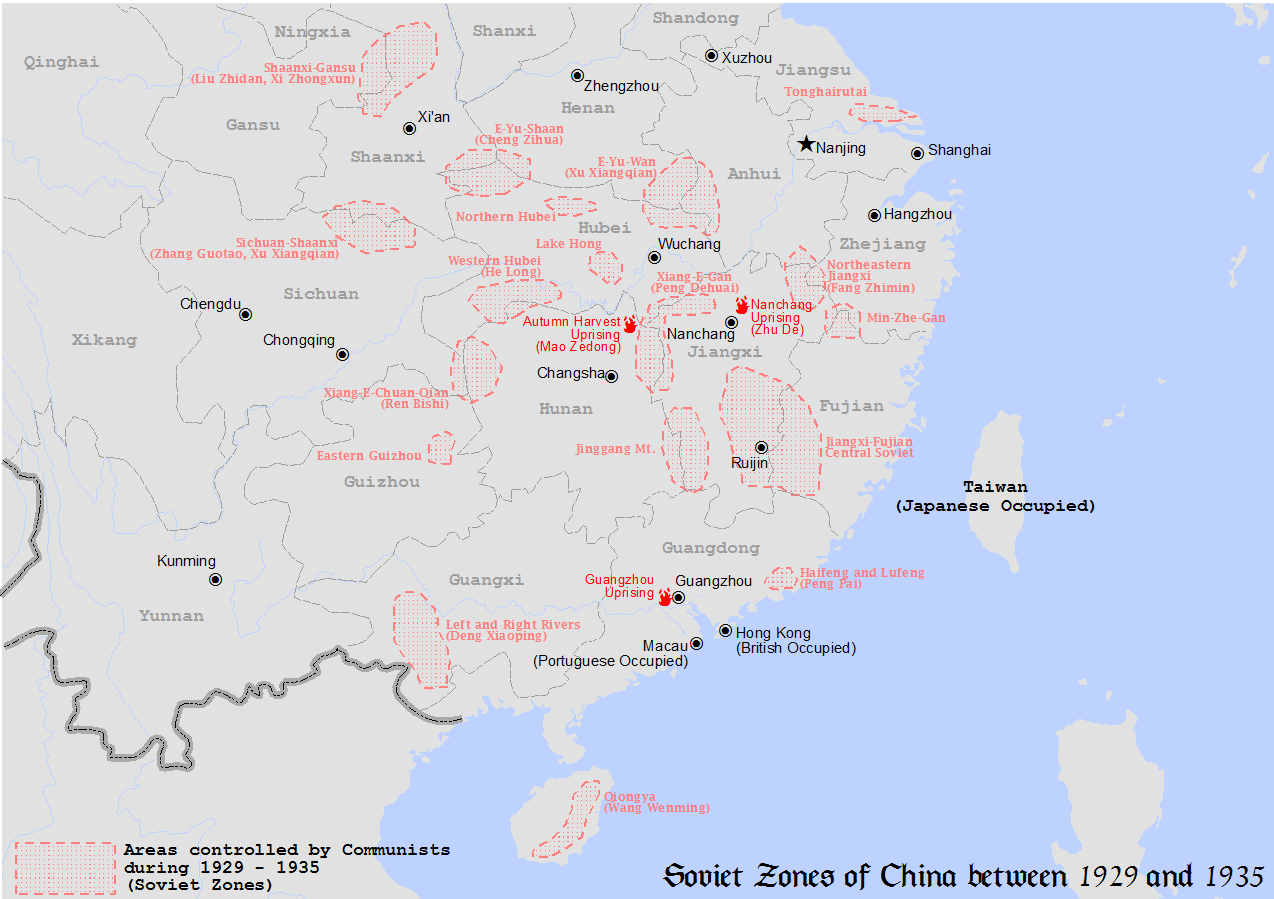
Map of Soviet zones including Lake Hong

Its name originates from: Hong (洪) vast, immense; flood, deluge + Hu (湖) lake, and is used as the name for the nearby county-level city of Honghu. This lake's water levels and drainage have been profoundly shapes by centuries of human activity, most notably the building of dikes to redirect floodwaters

It is known for its lotus flowers.

== See also ==
- Red Guards on Honghu Lake
- Red Guards on Honghu Lake (film)
