= Eeva Kilpi =

Finnish writer and feminist (1928–2026)

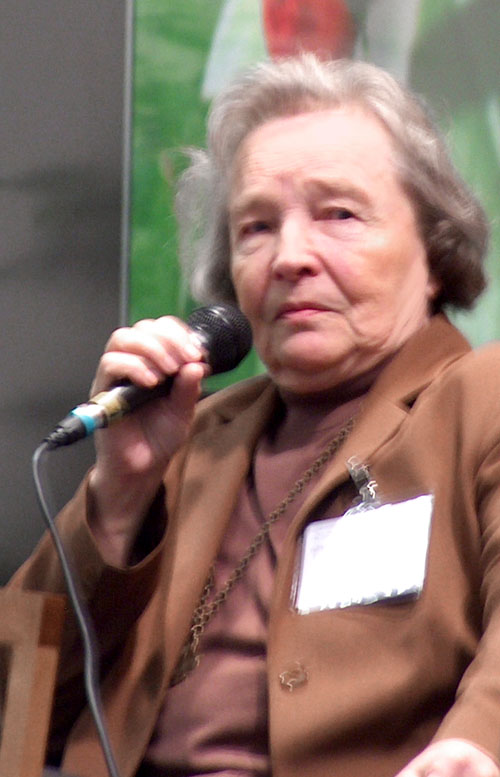
- Kilpi at the Helsinki Book Fair (2008)
- Born: Eeva Karin Salo; 18 February 1928; Hiitola, Finnish Karelia
- Died: 27 June 2026 (aged 98); Espoo, Finland
- Occupation: Writer
- Notable work: See Selected works
- Parents: Solmu Aulis Aimo (father); Helmi Anna Maria (née Saharinen) Salo (mother)
- Awards: see Awards

Eeva Karin Kilpi (née Salo; 18 February 1928 – 27 June 2026) was a Finnish writer and feminist. Better known abroad than in Finland, her poetry, characterized as feminist humor, became popular in the 1980s.

== Life and career ==
Eeva Karin Salo was born on 18 February 1928, to Solmu Aulis Aimo and Helmi Anna Maria (née Saharinen) Salo within the former Karelian municipality of Hiitola, Finnish Karelia, where she lived until the coming of the Winter War.

During the Winter War, Kilpi and her family survived bombings by hiding in an underground cellar. Her father was later called away to the front lines and the family was forced to evacuate from the region. Kilpi ended up achieving an education in Helsinki, the capital and largest city in Finland.

Kilpi died in Espoo, Finland on 27 June 2026, at the age of 98.

== Awards ==
- State book awards (1968, 1974, 1984)
- Espoo Medal (1977)
- Pro Finlandia Medal (1974)
- Runeberg Prize (1990)
- Alfred Kordelin the general progress and education fund account Prize (1999)
- Karelia Award (2001)
- Thanks for the Book Award (2002)
- Nils Ferlin-priset (2007)
- Karelian Association Pro Karelia Badge

== Selected works ==
=== Short story collections ===
- Noidanlukko WSOY 1959
- Lapikkaita, WSOY 1966
- Rakkauden ja kuoleman pöytä, WSOY 1967
- Kesä ja keski-ikäinen nainen, WSOY 1970
- Hyvän yön tarinoita, WSOY 1971
- Se mitä ei koskaan sanota, WSOY 1979
- Kuolema ja nuori rakastaja, WSOY 1986
- Kootut novellit vuosilta 1959–1986, WSOY 1987

=== Novels ===
- Kukkivan maan rannat, WSOY 1960
- Nainen kuvastimessa, WSOY 1962
- Elämä edestakaisin, WSOY 1964
- Tamara, WSOY 1972
- Häätanhu, WSOY 1973
- Naisen päiväkirja, WSOY 1978
- Elämän evakkona, WSOY 1983
- Unta vain, WSOY 2007

=== Books ===
- Talvisodan aika, WSOY 1989
- Välirauha, ikävöinnin aika, WSOY 1990
- Jatkosodan aika, WSOY 1993
  - Muistojen aika. Yhteisnide kolmesta edellisestä kirjasta, WSOY 1998
- Rajattomuuden aika, WSOY 2001

=== Poetry collections ===
- Laulu rakkaudesta ja muita runoja, WSOY 1972
- Terveisin, WSOY 1976
- Runoja 1972–1976, WSOY 1978
- Ennen kuolemaa, WSOY 1982
- Animalia, WSOY 1987
- Laulu rakkaudesta, Eeva Kilven runot, Ellen Thesleffin kuvat, WSOY 1991
- Kiitos eilisestä, WSOY 1996
  - Laulu rakkaudesta. Kiitos eilisestä, 2000
- Perhonen ylittää tien. Kootut runot 1972–2000, WSOY 2000
- Kuolinsiivous, WSOY 2012

=== Essay collections ===
- Ihmisen ääni, WSOY 1976

== See also ==
- Fire and Ice: The Winter War of Finland and Russia

== Studies of her writings ==
- Savolainen, U. (2016). The Genre of Reminiscence Writing: Applying the Bakhtin Circle’s Genre Theories. In Genre-Text-Interpretation: Multidisciplinary Perspectives on Folklore and Beyond (pp. 203–231). Suomalaisen Kirjallisuuden Seura. (section on Eeva Kilpi, esp. pp. 213ff.)
