= Timo Torikka =

Finnish actor

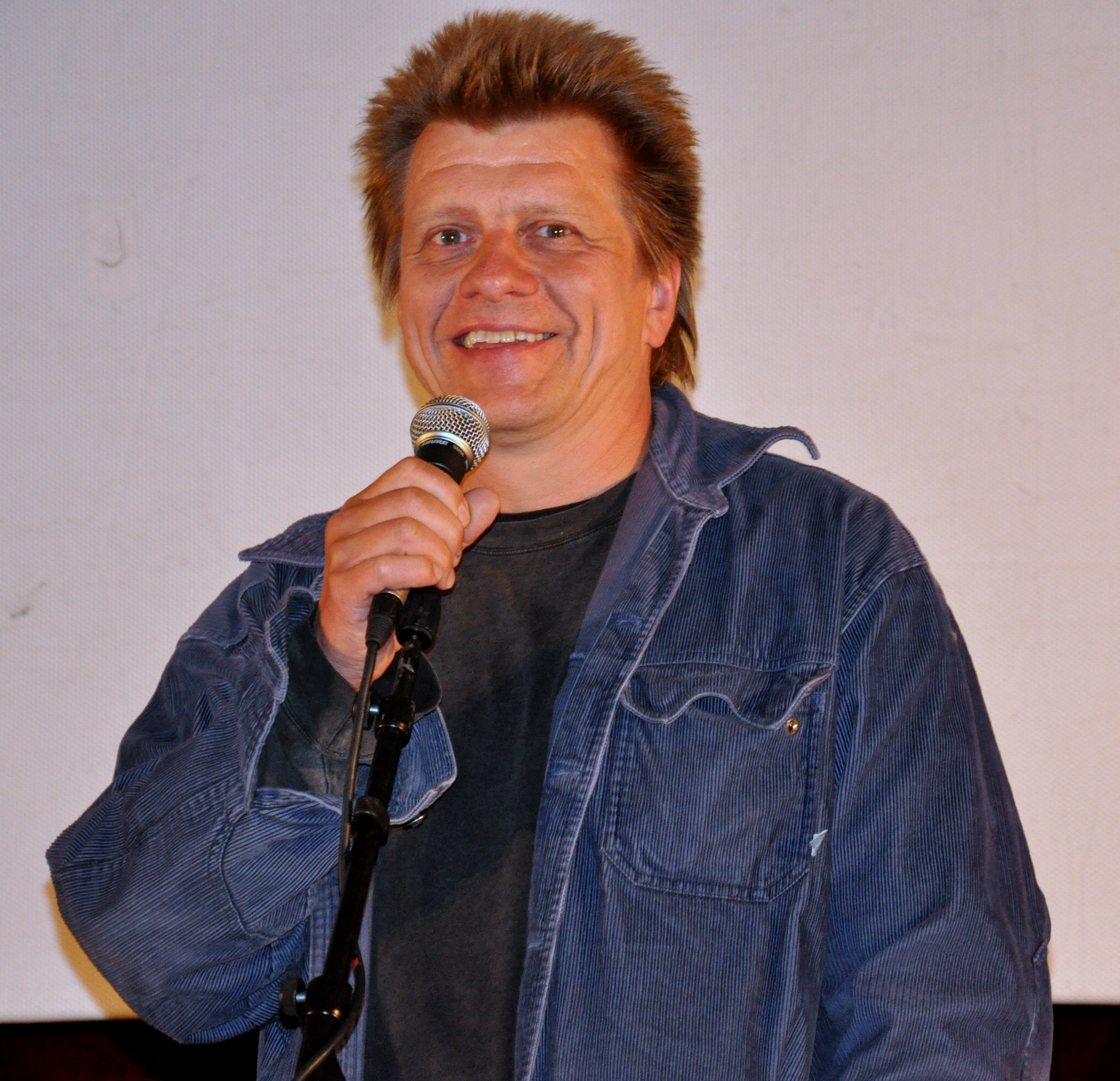
- Timo Torikka (2009)
- Born: 1 February 1958 (age 68); Finland

Timo Torikka (born 1 February 1958, in Kerava) is a Finnish actor. He graduated from the Theatre Academy of Finland in 1982, after which he has worked both on the stage and onscreen. One of his most well known parts is the role of Pentti Saari in Pekka Parikka's film Talvisota (The Winter War, 1989). He also acted in two episodes of French television series Maigret with Bruno Cremer.

Torikka was the writer and director of the 1993 television series Hobitit, an adaptation of J. R. R. Tolkien's The Hobbit and The Lord of the Rings for the Finnish public broadcaster Yle.

In 1997 he worked in the Theatre of Cologne, Germany in Karin Beier's Sturm (Tempest by Shakespeare) and between 2005 and 2007 he played Bill's role in Plus loin que loin ("Further than the furthest thing" by Zinnie Harris) in France.

In 2008 he played one of the principal roles in Mika Kaurismäki's film Kolme viisasta miestä (Three Wise Men).

== Partial filmography ==
- Jon (1983)
- The Winter War (Talvisota, 1989)
- Moomin (Muumilaakson tarinoita, 1990–1992, played Snufkin)
- Hobitit (1993 television series, all 9 episodes) as writer and director
- Tali-Ihantala 1944 (2007)
- Maigret et le fantôme (TV) (1994) : Inspecteur Ari Vaara
- Maigret en Finlande (TV) (1996) : Inspecteur Ari Vaara
- Three Wise Men (Kolme viisasta miestä, 2008)
- Hellsinki (Rööperi, 2009)
- The House of Branching Love (Haarautuvan rakkauden talo, 2009)
- Brothers (Veljekset, 2011)
- August (Elokuu, 2011)
