= Kalle Päätalo =

Finnish novelist

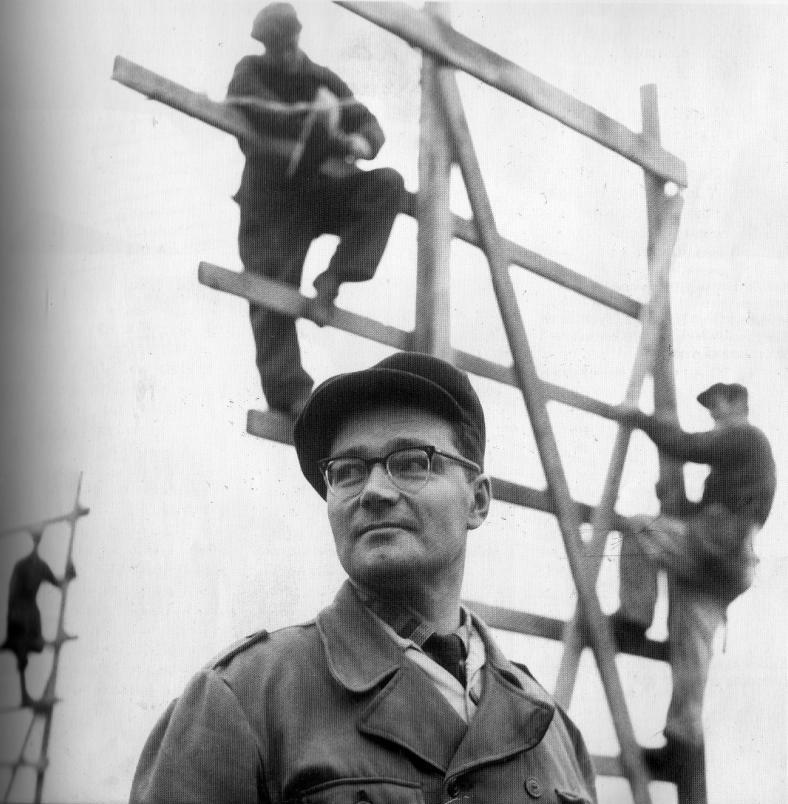
- Päätalo in 1958
- Born: 11 November 1919 Taivalkoski, Oulu Province, Finland
- Died: 20 November 2000 (aged 81)
- Occupation: Novelist
- Notable works: Iijoki

Kaarlo (Kalle) Alvar Päätalo (11 November 1919 – 20 November 2000) was a Finnish novelist, the most popular Finnish writer in the 20th century. His Iijoki series, comprising 26 novels, is one of the longest autobiographical works ever written.

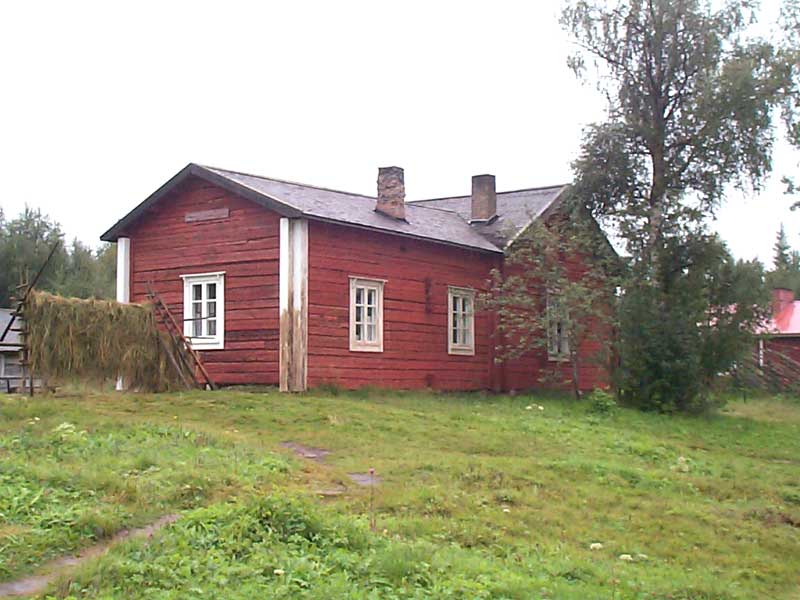
The house on Kallioniemi was the childhood home of Päätalo. It was built by his father.

== Early life ==
Päätalo was born on 11 November 1919, and spent his childhood in the village of Taivalkoski, Oulu Province, Finland. Päätalo was the second oldest of eight children. Before Him, Toivo was born, but he died as a baby. After Päätalo, another son and five girls were born into the family. The oldest sister was Martta Aili (later Siljola, Keskisimonen and Lohilahti, 1922–1974). The next sibling was Brother Manne (born January 1, 1925), he died as a victim of a stabbing on September 2, 1947. After Manne, the family welcomed four girls: Kaarina, Edith, Terttu and Aune.

His father, a lumberjack, suffered from mental disorders, and Päätalo had to maintain his family from the age of 14 in his father's profession. At the same time, he dreamed about becoming a writer and read avidly, being much influenced by Jack London's Martin Eden and Mika Waltari's guidebook for aspiring writers. His war service in Winter War and Continuation War was cut short by being wounded. After the wars, he moved to Tampere where he studied at technical school, becoming a building contractor, and wrote short stories that were published in various magazines. He was married twice and had two daughters by the second marriage.

== Career ==
Päätalo debuted as a novelist in 1958 with a novel set at a building site in Tampere. In his second novel Our Daily Bread, the first book in the five-volume Koillismaa series, he turned to his native region. By this time, Päätalo was able to turn a freelance writer, and from 1962 until his death, he published one book each year. In 1971 he published what was to be the first volume in the 26-volume series Juuret Iijoen törmässä ('Roots in the Bank of River Ii'), probably the longest autobiographical narrative in the world (some 17,000 pages in total). The series charts Päätalo's life from his early childhood to the publication of his first novel, at the same time offering an interesting view of Finnish history over some four decades as seen from an individual's viewpoint.

Though Päätalo's first books got favourable reviews, the prevailing critical attitude to his writing soon turned negative while his popularity remained steady. Some found the slowness of his narration and its seeming sticking to trifles tedious, while his innumerable fans, mostly among his own generation, were fascinated by the very abundance of detail, a meticulous reconstruction of the past. Other strengths of Päätalo's style are his absolute sincerity to the reader - he seemed to leave nothing of his life untold, yet his writing is never merely sensational - and his skillful way with spoken Finnish, especially his native dialect. Recently, many critics have begun to see his works in a new light and they have also attracted the attention of younger readers. As a recognition for his career, Päätalo received the Pro Finlandia medal and Professor's title in 1978 and an honorary doctorate at the University of Oulu in 1994.

Known as "the king of reprints" because of the phenomenal success of his books, Päätalo published 39 novels, two collections of short stories and one play in his lifetime, with more short stories having been published posthumously. Four of his books have been filmed, and all five volumes of the Koillismaa series have been translated into English by Richard Impola.

Päätalo died 20 November 2000.

== Works translated into English ==
- Our Daily Bread (Koillismaa, 1960)
- Before the Storm (Selkosen kansaa, 1962)
- Storm over the Land (Myrsky Koillismaassa, 1963)
- After the Storm (Myrskyn jälkeen, 1965)
- The Winter of the Black Snow (Mustan lumen talvi, 1969)
