= Ski Patrol (1940 film) =

- Film poster
- Directed by: Lew Landers
- Written by: Paul Huston
- Produced by: Ben Pivar, Warren Douglas
- Cinematography: Milton R. Krasner
- Edited by: Edward Curtiss
- Music by: Frank Skinner (uncredited)
- Distributed by: Universal Pictures
- Release date: May 10, 1940
- Running time: 64 min.
- Country: United States
- Language: English

See also Ski Patrol (disambiguation)

Ski Patrol is a 1940 American war film directed by Lew Landers, produced by Ben Pivar and Warren Douglas and released by Universal Pictures. It is known to be the only Hollywood film about the Winter War between Finland and the Soviet Union.

Two rival skiers competing in the 1936 Olympics, one Russian and one Finn, are pitted against each other just a few years later, as the Russians attack the Finnish border in the Winter War, and the Finnish heroes defend a snow-laden mountain pass. The plot takes great historical liberties in its storyline, such as with all "Finnish" uniforms and insignias are wrong.

== Cast ==
- Philip Dorn as Lt. Viktor Ryder
- Luli Deste as Julia Engel
- Stanley Fields as Birger Simberg
- Samuel S. Hinds as Capt. Per Vallgren
- Edward Norris as Paavo Luuki
- John Qualen as Gustaf Nerkuu
- Hardie Albright as Tyko Gallen
- John Arledge as Dick Reynolds
- John Ellis as Knut Vallgren
- Henry Brandon as Jan Sikorsky
- Kathryn Adams Doty as Lissa Ryder
- Leona Roberts as Mother Ryder
- Abner Biberman as Russian Field Commander
- Wade Boteler as German Olympics Spokesman
- Addison Richards as James Burton, speaker
- Reed Hadley as Ivan Dubroski

== Reception ==
Bosley Crowther of The New York Times wrote negatively of the film, referring to it as "a feeble, unconvincing melodrama of the Russo-Finnish War", accusing it of plagiarizing the World War I film The Doomed Battalion, concluding that the "heroic defense of the Finns certainly deserves a better cinema memorial than this." Variety similarly referred to the film as "turned out in a hurry in an effort to cash in on headlines that now are barely remembered", but praised Dorn and some of the other actors characterizations, as well as Krasner's cinematography. The National Board of Review Magazine was more positive, writing: "A grim picture of the present war, showing the ski patrol defending a mountain, the gateway to Finland. Beautiful snow scenes and some truly marvelous skiing."

== See also ==
- Winter War in popular culture
- The Winter War, a 1989 Finnish war film
