= Richard Impola =

Finnish–American professor and translator (1923–2015)

Richard Aarre Impola (1923 – March 18, 2015) was a Finnish–American professor and translator. A retired professor of English language and literature at the State University of New York, college at New Paltz, he translated Finnish poetry and prose into the English language, including Väinö Linna's Under the North Star trilogy, of which the third part was published on the same day he was presented with the medal of Knight First Class of the Order of the Lion of Finland in 2003.

== Biography ==
Impola was born in Ahmeek, Michigan. Impola's father moved to Michigan from Siikajoki, Ostrobothnia, Finland, and his mother was born in the US to parents who had emigrated from Pudasjärvi, Northern Ostrobothnia. Richard Impola was the ninth of the ten children in the family. In his childhood he did not speak Finnish, despite living in a community where Finnish was widely spoken.

Impola studied English language and literature at Columbia University, New York. He met his future wife Helvi at a Finnish community hall in New York. Impola taught at SUNY until 1983, when he retired. After that, he started translating Finnish works into English. Among his translations are Linna's North Star trilogy, Antti Tuuri's war novel The Winter War, several works by Kalle Päätalo, and Aleksis Kivi's Seven Brothers.

After his retirement, he founded the Finnish American Translators Association (FATA).

Impola died at the age of 91 in Poughkeepsie.
