= Leonidas Donskis =

Lithuanian academic and politician (1962–2016)

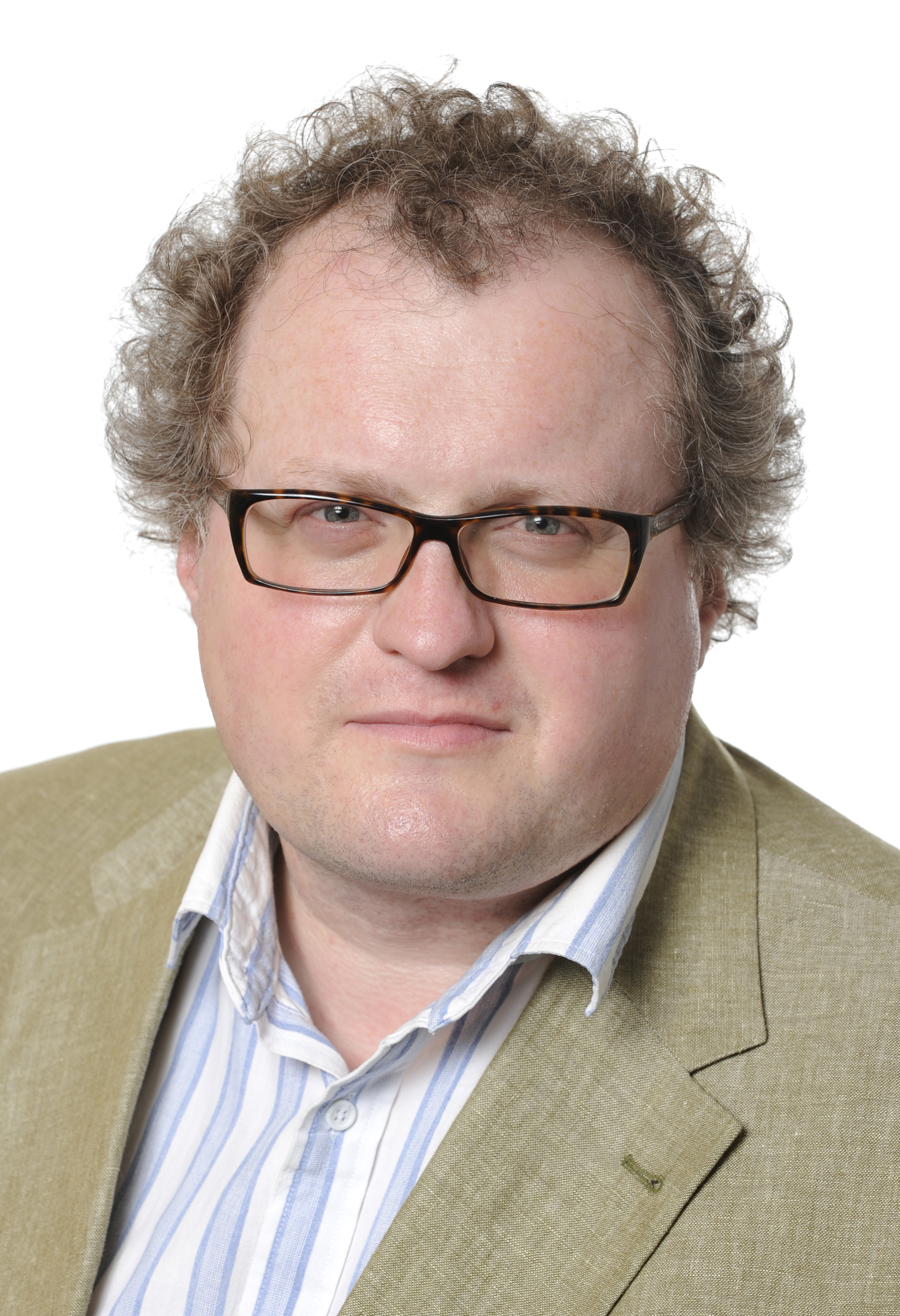
- Born: 13 August 1962; Klaipėda, Lithuania
- Died: 21 September 2016 (aged 54); Vilnius, Lithuania
- Spouse: Jolanta Donskienė

Education
- Education: Lithuanian Academy of Music and Theatre; Vilnius University; University of Helsinki

Leonidas Donskis (13 August 1962 – 21 September 2016) was a Lithuanian-Jewish philosopher, political theorist, historian of ideas, and social analyst. In addition to this, he was also a political commentator, professor of politics and head of "VDU Academia Cum Laude" at Vytautas Magnus University, Honorary Consul of Finland in Kaunas, and deputy chairman of the Lithuanian Jewish Community. He was also a member of the European Parliament (MEP) from 2009 to 2014.

As a public figure in Lithuania, he acted as a defender of human rights and civil liberties. In 2004, Donskis was awarded the title of the ambassador for tolerance and diversity in Lithuania by the European Commission. A center-right politician, he was always opposed to all extreme or exclusionary attitudes and forms of violent politics, and, instead, was leaning to liberalism with its advocacy of individual reason and conscience, ability to coexist with democratic programs of other non-exclusive ideologies, and moderation.

== Early life and education ==
Leonidas Donskis was born in Klaipėda into a Lithuanian Jewish family. In 1985, he graduated from Lithuanian State Conservatoire (now Lithuanian Academy of Music and Theatre), with a BA in philology and theater, and then pursued his graduate studies in philosophy at the University of Vilnius, Lithuania, graduating with an M.A in 1987. In 1990, he earned his first doctorate in philosophy from the University of Vilnius with the dissertation title Culture in Crisis and the Philosophy of Culture: Oswald Spengler, Arnold J. Toynbee, Lewis Mumford.. In 1999, he earned his second doctorate in social and moral philosophy (D.Soc.Sc.) from the University of Helsinki, Finland with a dissertation entitled: The End of Ideology and Utopia? Moral Imagination and Cultural Criticism in the Twentieth Century..

His main scholarly interests were the philosophy of history, philosophy of culture, philosophy of literature, philosophy of the social sciences, civilization theory, political theory, history of ideas, and studies in Central and East European thought.

== Career ==
A wandering scholar, he researched and lectured in the United States, Great Britain, and Europe. He was involved in various public philosophical and political debates at the Institute of Art and Ideas. Donskis was an IREX-International Research and Exchanges Board Fellow, a Fulbright Scholar, and a visiting professor of philosophy at Dickinson College in Pennsylvania, US; a Swedish Institute Guest Researcher at the University of Gothenburg and a guest professor of East European studies at the University of Uppsala, Sweden; a Leverhulme Trust Visiting Research Fellow at the University of Bradford, Great Britain; Paschal P. Vacca Chair (distinguished visiting professor) of Liberal Arts at the University of Montevallo in Alabama, US; and a fellow at the Collegium Budapest/Institute for Advanced Study, Hungary.

Until 7 June 2009, Leonidas Donskis acted as professor of political science at Vytautas Magnus University in Kaunas, Lithuania. From 2005 to 2009, he served as professor and dean of the Faculty of Political Science and Diplomacy at Vytautas Magnus University. In addition, he acted as docent of social and moral philosophy at the University of Helsinki, and as extraordinary visiting professor of cultural theory at Tallinn University, Estonia. From September 2014, Leonidas Donskis acted as vice-president for research at ISM University of Management and Economics. He was also a member of the editorial board of the magazine New Eastern Europe.

=== Political activity ===
In 2009, the Lithuanian Liberal Movement Party invited Donskis to campaign for the European Parliament. He was the number one candidate on the list of the party.

At the European Parliament (term 2009–2014), Donskis worked as a part of the Alliance of Liberals and Democrats for Europe group (ALDE), which is the third largest political group in the Parliament. He was a member of the Development Committee and member of the Subcommittee on Human Rights and also a substitute member at the committee of Civil Liberties, Justice and Home Affairs.

Donskis was the full member of the EU and Armenia, Azerbaijan, and Georgia Parliamentary Cooperation Committee delegation, as well as the delegation of the Parliamentary Assembly of the EURONEST. He was also a substitute member of the EU relations with Israel, Moldova, and the Euro-Mediterranean Parliamentary Assembly delegations.

== Personal life and death ==
Donskis died on 21 September 2016 in Vilnius Airport of an apparent heart attack.

Donskis said that he had been influenced by Lewis Mumford, Louis Dumont, Ernest Gellner, Isaiah Berlin, and Zygmunt Bauman.

== Bibliography ==
Donskis has published widely in international refereed journals, and is the author or editor of more than fifty books, some of them in English, including:

- Bauman, Zygmunt (2016). Liquid evil: living with TINA. Malden, MA: Polity. ISBN 978-1-5095-0811-2.
- Bauman, Zygmunt; Donskis, Leonidas (2013). Moral blindness: the loss of sensitivity in liquid modernity. Cambridge, UK Malden, MA: Polity Press. ISBN 978-0-7456-6275-6.
- Donskis, Leonidas (2011). Modernity in Crisis. doi:10.1057/9780230339194. ISBN 978-1-349-29158-8.
- Donskis, Leonidas (2009). Troubled identity and the modern world. New York, NY: Palgrave Macmillan. ISBN 978-0-230-60770-5.
- Donskis, Leonidas (2008). Power and imagination : studies in politics and literature. New York : Peter Lang. ISBN 978-1-4331-0125-0.
- Donskis, Leonidas, ed. (2011). Loyalty, dissent, and betrayal: modern Lithuania and East-Central European moral imagination (PDF). On the boundary of two worlds: Identity, freedom, and moral imagination in the Baltics. Amsterdam New York: Rodopi. ISBN 978-94-012-0171-1.Modern Lithuania and East-Central European Moral Imagination (Amsterdam & New York: Rodopi, 2005),
- Donskis, Leonidas (2003). Forms of hatred : the troubled imagination in modern philosophy and literature. Amsterdam; New York, NY : Rodopi. ISBN 978-90-420-1066-6. (VIBS-Value Inquiry Book Series Nomination for the 2003 Best Book in Social Philosophy in North America; VIBS 2003 Best Book Award),
- Donskis, Leonidas (2 September 2003). Identity and Freedom. Routledge. doi:10.4324/9780203402726. ISBN 978-0-203-40272-6.
- TDonskis, Leonidas (2000). The end of ideology and utopia ? moral imagination and cultural criticism in the twentieth century. American university studies. New York: P. Lang. ISBN 978-0-8204-4937-1.

Donskis's works originally written in Lithuanian and English have been translated into Danish, Estonian, Finnish, German, Hungarian, Italian, Korean, Polish, Portuguese, Romanian, Russian, Spanish, Swedish, Turkish, and Ukrainian. He edited book series for Editions Rodopi, B. V. (Amsterdam and New York), one in Baltic studies (On the Boundary of Two Worlds: Identity, Freedom, and Moral Imagination in the Baltics), and another – VIBS-Value Inquiry Book Series. From 2005 to 2009, he served as a member of the Standing Committee for the Humanities (SCH) in the European Science Foundation (ESF).
