= Ski Patrol =

Ski patrol is an organization that provides medical, rescue, and hazard prevention services to the injured in ski area boundaries, or sometimes beyond into backcountry settings.

Ski Patrol may also refer to:

- Ski Patrol (1940 film), an American war film
- Ski Patrol (1990 film), an American comedy film
- "Ski Patrol", an instructional video for new members of the ski patrol by Happy Tree Friends
- Ski Patrol (band)

== See also ==
- Military patrol, a winter sport from which Olympic biathlon was developed
