= On the Boundary of Two Worlds: Identity, Freedom, and Moral Imagination in the Baltics =

Academic book series

On the Boundary of Two Worlds: Identity, Freedom, and Moral Imagination in the Baltics (ISSN 1570-7121) is an academic book series focused on the critical examination of identity, politics, and culture in the Baltic countries. By offering a wide scope of the social science and humanities disciplines, the book series encourages intercultural dialogue and pursues interdisciplinary research in the field of Baltic studies.

The book series was founded in 2004 and is published by Brill.

On the Boundary of Two Worlds: Identity, Freedom, and Moral Imagination in the Baltics book cover

== Editors ==
Founding Editor:
Leonidas Donskis, Member of the European Parliament, and previously Professor and Dean of Vytautas Magnus University School of Political Science and Diplomacy, Kaunas, Lithuania
Associate Editor:
Martyn Housden, University of Bradford, UK

== Editorial Board ==
The Editorial Board consists of:

- Timo Airaksinen, University of Helsinki, Finland
- Egidijus Aleksandravičius, Lithuanian Emigration Institute, Vytautas Magnus University, Kaunas, Lithuania
- Auksė Balčytienė, Vytautas Magnus University, Lithuania
- Stefano Bianchini, University of Bologna, Forlì Campus, Italy
- Endre Bojtar, Institute of Literary Studies, Budapest, Hungary
- Ineta Dabašinskienė, Vytautas Magnus University, Lithuania
- Pietro U. Dini, University of Pisa, Italy
- Robert Ginsberg, Pennsylvania State University, USA
- Martyn Housden, University of Bradford, UK
- Andres Kasekamp, University of Tartu, Estonia
- Andreas Lawaty, Nordost-Institute, Lüneburg, Germany
- Olli Loukola, University of Helsinki, Finland
- Bernard Marchadier, Institut d'études slaves, Paris, France
- Silviu Miloiu, Valahia University, Targoviste, Romania
- Valdis Muktupāvels, University of Latvia, Riga, Latvia
- Hannu Niemi, University of Helsinki, Finland
- Irina Novikova, University of Latvia, Riga, Latvia
- Yves Plasseraud; Paris, France
- Rein Raud, Tallinn University, Estonia
- Alfred Erich Senn, University of Wisconsin–Madison, USA, and Vytautas Magnus University, Kaunas, Lithuania
- André Skogström-Filler, University Paris VIII-Saint-Denis, France
- David Smith, University of Glasgow, UK
- Saulius Sužiedėlis, Millersville University, USA
- Joachim Tauber, Nordost-Institut, Lüneburg, Germany
- Tomas Venclova, Yale University, USA
- Tonu Viik, Tallinn University, Estonia.

== Volumes ==
- # 36. Prelude to Baltic Linguistics. By Pietro U. Dini. ISBN 978-90-420-3798-4 E-ISBN 978-94-012-1046-1
- # 35. Baltic Eugenics: Bio-Politics, Race and Nation in Interwar Estonia, Latvia and Lithuania 1918-1940. Edited by Björn M. Felder and Paul J. Weindling. ISBN 978-90-420-3722-9 E-ISBN 978-94-012-0976-2
- #34. The Human Sausage Factory. A Study of Post-War Rumour in Tartu. By Eda Kalmre. ISBN 978-90-420-3717-5 E-ISBN 978-94-012-0973-1
- #33. The Life and Thought of Lev Karsavin: “Strength made perfect in weakness…”. By Dominic Rubin. ISBN 978-90-420-3646-8 E-ISBN 978-94-012-0914-4
- #32. Transitions of Lithuanian Postmodernism. Lithuanian Literature in the Post-Soviet Period. Edited by Mindaugas Kvietkauskas. ISBN 978-90-420-3441-9 E-ISBN 978-94-012-0728-7
- #31. Undigested Past. The Holocaust in Lithuania. By Robert van Voren. ISBN 978-90-420-3371-9 E-book ISBN 978-94-012-0070-7
- #30. Forgotten Pages in Baltic History. Diversity and Inclusion. Edited by Martyn Housden and David J. Smith. ISBN 978-90-420-3313-9 E-book ISBN 978-90-420-3314-6
- #29. The last ambassador. August Torma, soldier, diplomat, spy. By Tina Tamman. ISBN 978-90-420-3313-9 E-book ISBN 978-90-420-3314-6
- #28. Post-Communist Democratisation in Lithuania. Elites, parties, and youth political organisations. 1988-2001. By Diana Janušauskienė. ISBN 978-90-420-3249-1 E-book ISBN 978-90-420-3250-7
- #27. Soldiers of Memory. World War II and Its Aftermath in Estonian Post-Soviet Life Stories. Edited by Ene Kõresaar. ISBN 978-90-420-3243-9 E-book ISBN 978-90-420-3244-6
- #26. Shrinking Citizenship. Discursive Practices that Limit Democratic Participation in Latvian Politics. Edited by Maria Golubeva and Robert Gould. ISBN 978-90-420-3133-3 E-book ISBN 978-90-420-3134-0
- #25. From Recognition to Restoration. Latvia’s History as a Nation-State. Edited and Introduced by David J. Smith, David J. Galbreath and Geoffrey Swain. ISBN 978-90-420-3098-5 E-book ISBN 978-90-420-3099-2
- #24. Adopting and Remembering Soviet Reality. Life Stories of Lithuanian Women, 1945 – 1970. Editor and Author Dalia Leinarte. ISBN 978-90-420-3062-6 E-book ISBN 978-90-420-3063-3
- #23. Cold War in Psychiatry. Human Factors, Secret Actors. By Robert van Voren. ISBN 978-90-420-3046-6
- #22. A cat’s lick. Democratisation and minority communities in the post-Soviet Baltic. By Timofey Agarin. ISBN 978-90-420-2989-7
- #21. Selected Papers. By Vasily Sesemann. Edited by Mykolas Drunga and Leonidas Donskis. ISBN 978-90-420-2825-8
- #20. 1939: The Year that Changed Everything in Lithuania’s History. By Sarunas Liekis. ISBN 978-90-420-2762-6
- #19. Lithuania in the 1920s. A Diplomat’s Diary. By Robert W. Heingartner. Introduction and Commentary by Alfred Erich Senn. ISBN 978-90-420-2760-2
- #18. Minority Integration in Central Eastern Europe. Between Ethnic Diversity and Equality. Edited and introduced by Timofey Agarin and Malte Brosig. ISBN 978-90-420-2733-6
- #17. On Dissidents and Madness. From The Soviet Union of Leonid Brezhnev to the "Soviet Union" of Vladimir Putin. By Robert van Voren. ISBN 978-90-420-2584-4 (hardbound), ISBN 978-90-420-2585-1 (paperback)
- #16. The Thing and Art. Two Essays on the Ontotopy of the Work of Art. By Arvydas Šliogeris. Translated from Lithuanian by Robertas Beinartas. Introduced by Leonidas Donskis. ISBN 978-90-420-2564-6
- #15. The Case for Latvia. Disinformation Campaigns Against a Small Nation. Fourteen Hard Questions and Straight Answers about a Baltic Country. By Jukka Rislakki. ISBN 978-90-420-2423-6 (hardbound), ISBN 978-90-420-2424-3 (paperback)
- #14. Names of Nihil. By Arvydas Šliogeris. Translated from Lithuanian by Robertas Beinartas. Preface by Leonidas Donskis. ISBN 978-90-420-2402-1
- #13. Continuity and Change in the Baltic Sea Region. Comparing Foreign Policies. By David J. Galbreath, Ainius Lašas and Jeremy W. Lamoreaux. ISBN 978-90-420-2386-4
- #12. Neighbours or enemies? Germans, the Baltic and beyond. By John Hiden and Martyn Housden. ISBN 978-90-420-2349-9
- #11. Making Russians. Meaning and Practice of Russification in Lithuania and Belarus after 1863. By Darius Staliūnas.ISBN 978-90-420-2267-6
- #10. Lost and Found. The Discovery of Lithuania in American Fiction. By Aušra Paulauskienė. ISBN 978-90-420-2266-9
- #9. Lithuania 1940. Revolution from Above. By Alfred Erich Senn.
- #8. Aesthetics. By Vasily Sesemann. Translated by Mykolas Drunga. Edited and Annotated by Leonidas Donskis.
- #7. Vasily Sesemann. Experience, Formalism, and the Question of Being. By Thorsten Botz-Bornstein. ISBN 978-90-420-2092-4
- #6. Baltic Postcolonialism. Edited by Violeta Kelertas. ISBN 978-90-420-1959-1
- #5. Upton Sinclair: The Lithuanian Jungle. Upon the Centenary of The Jungle (1905 and 1906) by Upton Sinclair., by Giedrius Subačius. ISBN 978-90-420-1879-2
- #4. Loyalty, Dissent, and Betrayal. Modern Lithuania and East-Central European Moral Imagination, by Leonidas Donskis. Preface by Zygmunt Bauman . ISBN 978-90-420-1727-6
- #3. The Baltic States and their Region. New Europe or Old?, Edited by David J. Smith. ISBN 978-90-420-1666-8
- #2. Estonia. Identity and Independence, Edited by Jean-Jacques Subrenat. Translated into English by David Cousins, Eric Dickens, Alexander Harding, Richard C. Waterhouse. ISBN 978-90-420-0890-8
- # 1. The Vanished World of Lithuanian Jews, Edited by Alvydas Nikžentaitis, Stefan Schreiner & Darius Staliunas. ISBN 978-90-420-0850-2
