= Czechoslovak resistance =

Czechoslovak resistance may refer to:

- Resistance in the Protectorate of Bohemia and Moravia
- Slovak National Uprising
- Prague Spring, 1968 Czech resistance to Soviet domination
- Velvet Revolution, 1989 Czech resistance to Soviet domination
