= Across Ten Thousand Rivers and One Thousand Mountains =

1959 film

Wan shui qian shan
- Traditional Chinese: 萬水千山
- Simplified Chinese: 万水千山
- Directed by: Yin Cheng
- Starring: Huiliang Chen; Kai Huang; Ma Lan
- Production company: August First Film Studio
- Release date: 1959
- Country: China
- Language: Mandarin

Wan shui qian shan (transl. Ten thousand rivers and one thousand mountains) is a 1959 Chinese film directed by Yin Cheng.

This movie is a general depiction of the 1930s Long March of the Chinese Red Army.
