= Benita Plezere =

Latvian artist

Benita Plezere-Eglīte (née Benita Plezere; born on 12 October 1937 in Riga, Latvia) is a Latvian repressed person known for the drawings she made when she was deported to Siberia.

== Biography ==
Benita's father was a farmer from the village of Annenieki in Dobele Municipality, where the family owned a 205 hectares (510 acres) farm called "Tērces". Benita was raised on this farm with her older brother and sister. Her mother was a school teacher from Jelgava. On 25 March 1949 Benita Plezere and her family were deported to the village of Odesskoye, in the Omsk Region of the USSR, as they were classified as a kulak family for owning more than 30 hectares (74 acres) of land before the Second World War. The family spent seven years in Siberia before they were finally permitted to leave in October 1956. The family returned to Latvia in 1956 where they found their farm had been destroyed; all the wood from the house had been removed and used as firewood, leaving only the foundations, and all the farmland had been made part of the local kolkhoz.

== Drawings ==
Benita Plezere is known for the drawings she made whilst living as a deportee in Siberia, which she then sent to her godmother back home in Latvia. The drawings depict her family's arrest, the journey to Siberia and their everyday lives in Omsk. Once the family returned, in 1956, Benita's mother hid the drawings as she was afraid of what could happen if the Soviet authorities found them. However, in 1989, the pictures were taken from their hiding place when the family thought it was safer because Latvia was breaking away from the Soviet Union. Once the independence of Latvia was restored the drawings were donated to the Museum of the Occupation of Latvia and in 1996 a selection of the drawings were published in the book "Through the Eyes of a Child". In 2016, a temporary exhibition of the same name was also displayed in the museum, and a short sand cinema film was made based on the life of Benita Plezere.
