= Jukka Rislakki =

Finnish writer (born 1945)

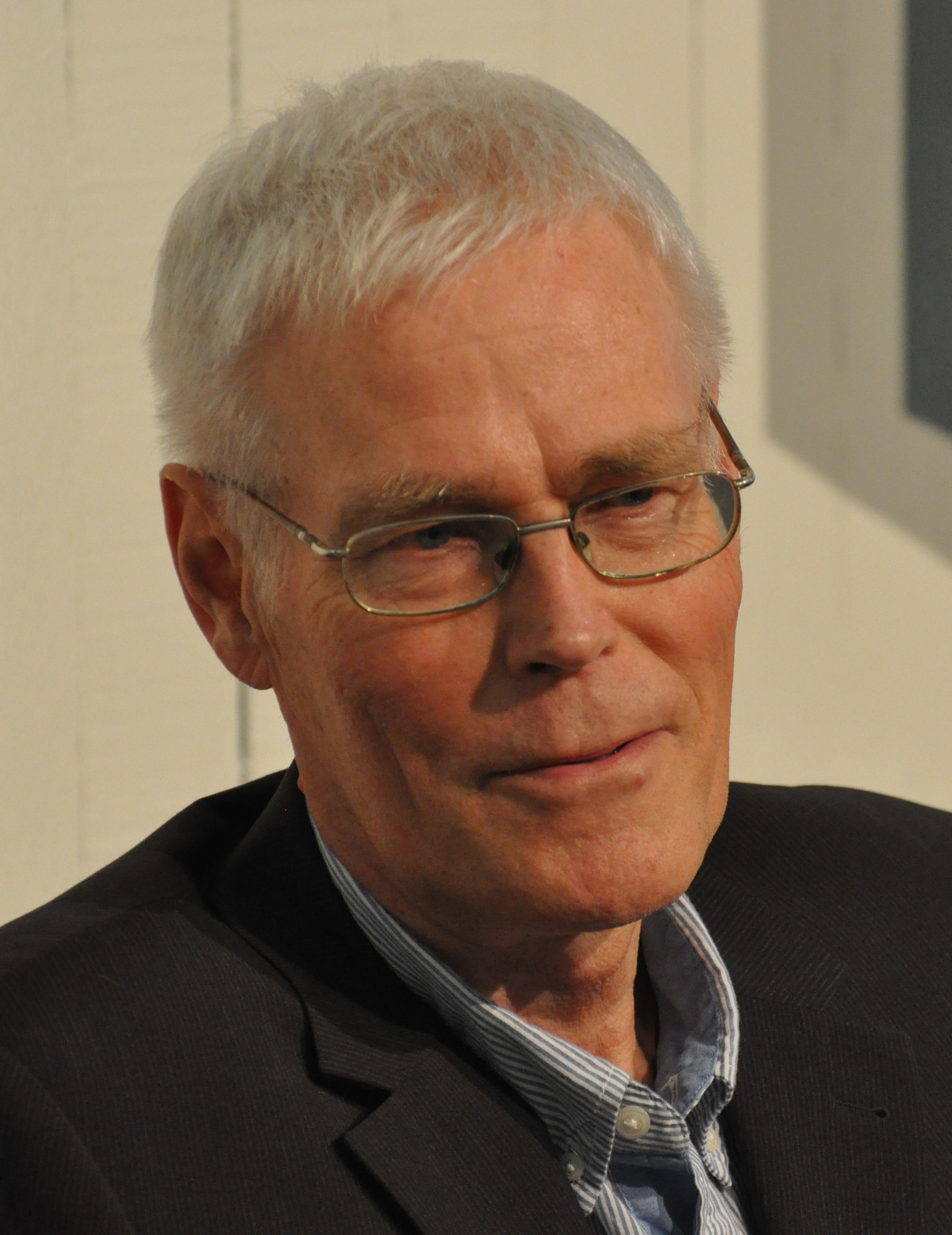
Jukka Rislakki in 2013

Jukka Rislakki (born 1945) is a Finnish journalist, non-fiction writer, and political cartoonist who has published a number of books, mostly on recent history of Finland, the Baltic states, and books on intelligence activities.

Born in Kuusankoski, Rislakki spent his childhood and youth in Jämsänkoski, completed a BA in political science at the University of Helsinki and worked as a journalist at the Helsingin Sanomat. Rislakki has worked as a foreign desk writer of Helsingin Sanomat and as Sunday issue reporter, most recently as the correspondent in the Baltic states.

Since the beginning af 2002 Rislakki lives in the Latvian coastal resort town Jūrmala, where he works as a freelance journalist, non-fiction writer, and cartoonist. Rislakki is married to a writer and the former Latvian ambassador to Finland and Estonia, Anna Žīgure.

== Bibliography ==
Rislakki has written several books in his native Finnish language; some of them have been translated into English, Latvian, Ukrainian, Lithuanian, Estonian, and Russian. Three books are available in an English translation: No Home For Us Here (2002), which he co-authored with Eila Lahti-Argutina, and The Case for Latvia (2008), the latter was also translated into Latvian and Russian; his book of cartoons A Handbook for Penguins and Yappers (2009) has also English texts. His new books in Finnish are about atom bomb, Cold War and Finland, and about Vorkuta prison camp uprising in 1953. The Vorkuta book was translated into Ukrainian, Latvian, Lithuanian, and Estonian. Rislakki won the 3rd prize in the Virginia Military Institute Cold War essay competition 2011 with his article "Without Mercy" – U.S. Strategic Intelligence and Finland in the Cold War. He received an acknowledgement award at the Lviv book fair (Ukraine) in 2015. Presently he writes spy novels and a book about Soviet agent Opperput. His memoirs were published in Finland in 2018.

== Awards and acknowledgements ==
Jukka Rislakki was awarded as Knight of the Order of the White Rose by the Finnish president Tarja Halonen on 16 March 2010 for his "work as a journalist and publicist", an award that was presented to Rislakki at the Embassy of Finland in Riga by ambassador to Latvia Maria Serenius.

Rislakki was awarded the Latvian Cross of Recognition for "selfless promotion of the Latvian image abroad and national patriotic education of youth". The Case for Latvia is the only book by Jukka Rislakki about Latvia, that has been translated to English. Jukka Rislakki received the Cross of Recognition in Riga on 4 May 2009, the day of restoration of independence of the Republic of Latvia.
