= Antti Tuuri =

Finnish writer (born 1944)

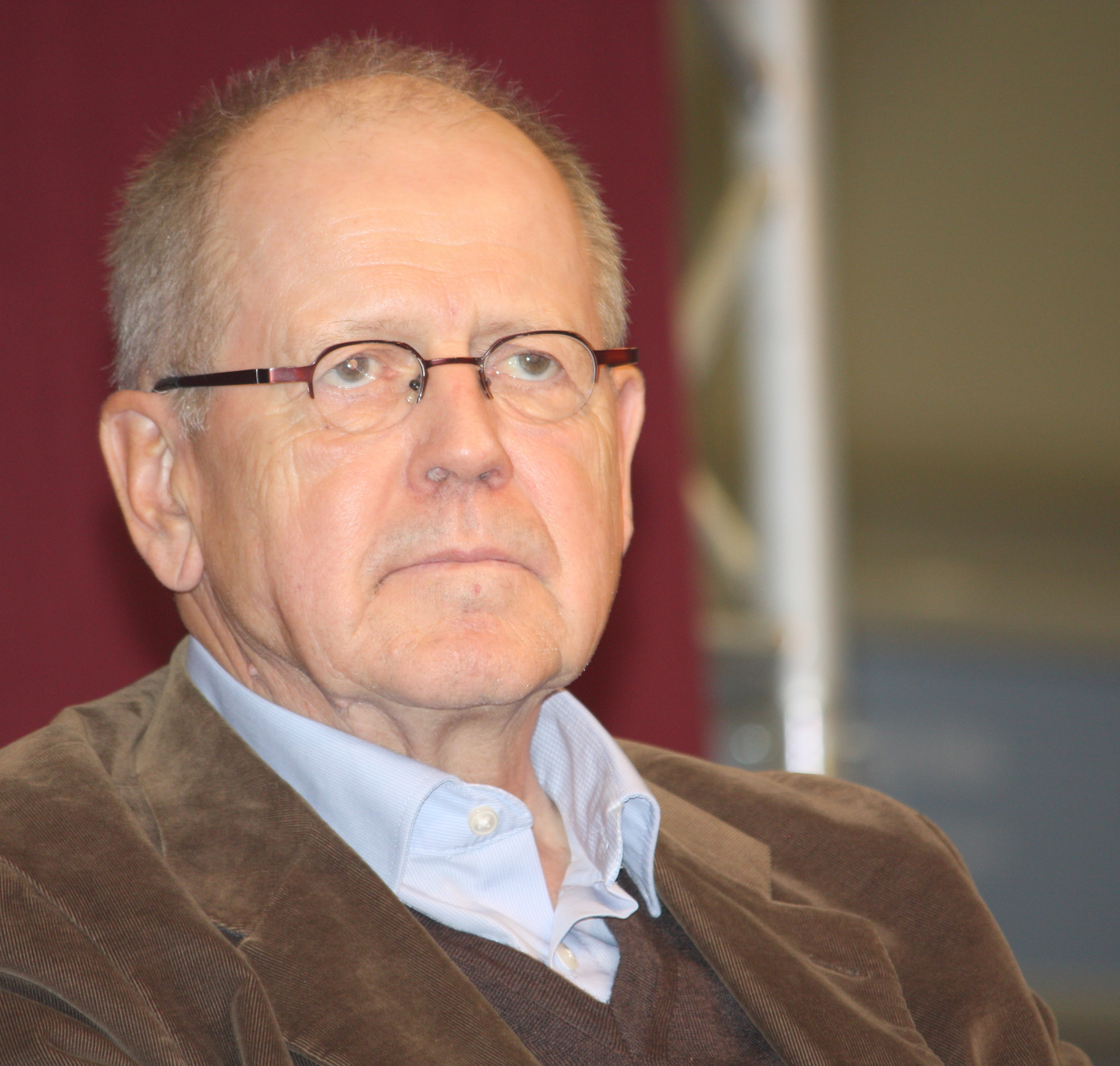
Antti Tuuri (2013)

Antti Elias Tuuri (born 1 October 1944, Kauhava, Southern Ostrobothnia) is a Finnish writer, known for his works dealing with Southern Ostrobothnia.

The Äitini-suku-series tells the stories of the Finns who immigrated to the United States. He received the J. H. Erkko Award in 1971 for Asioiden suhteet ja Lauantaina illalla, The Nordic Council's Literature Prize in 1985 for Pohjanmaa, and the Finlandia Prize in 1997 for his novel Lakeuden kutsu. Tuuri has also translated some Icelandic sagas.

Many of his novels have been made into films, including Rukajärven tie, known as "Ambush" in English, about the Continuation War 1941–44 in Karelia, Russia and Talvisota based on the novel by the same name, the Winter War 1939–1940. His novel Ikitie was made into the movie The Eternal Road.

Tuuri originally received a degree in engineering and worked as an engineer.

== Personal life ==
Tuuri is married to Merja Hietaharju-Tuuri; they live in Helsinki.
