= Red Guards on Honghu Lake (film) =

Hong hu chi wei dui
- Directed by: Fangqian Chen
- Written by: Jiangan Zhang
- Starring: Kuibin Xia; Ling Fu
- Release date: 1961
- Running time: 112 minutes
- Country: China
- Language: Mandarin

Hong hu chi wei dui (Chinese: 洪湖赤卫队) is a 1961 Chinese war film directed by Fangqian Chen. The film tells that captain Liu and secretary Han lead a group of red guards retreat from base area and fight back again.

== Cast ==
- Kuibin Xia as Chuang Liu
- Ling Fu as Qiu Ju
- Zengyin Cao as Colonel Feng
- Jinpeng Chen as Peng 'Ba Tian'
- Renxuan Chen as Hei Gu
