= Pekka Parikka =

Finnish film director

- Born: 2 May 1939
- Died: 21 March 1997 (aged 57); Helsinki, Finland
- Occupations: Film director Screenwriter
- Years active: 1963 - 1997

Pekka Parikka (2 May 1939 – 21 March 1997) was a Finnish film director and screenwriter. His 1989 film The Winter War was entered into the 40th Berlin International Film Festival. He is buried in the Hietaniemi Cemetery in Helsinki.

== Selected filmography ==
- Pohjanmaa (1988)
- The Winter War (1989)
- The Way to a Woman's Heart (1996)
