= Fire and Ice: The Winter War of Finland and Russia =

- Promotional poster for Fire and Ice
- Directed by: Ben Strout
- Narrated by: Phil Riesen
- Original language: English

Production
- Producer: Ben Strout
- Running time: 78 minutes

Original release
- Release: February 2, 2006

Fire and Ice: The Winter War of Finland and Russia is a documentary film, produced, written and directed by Ben Strout. It shows how the Finnish–Russian Winter War of 1939 influenced World War II and how Finland mobilized against the world's largest military power.

Among the witnesses in the documentary is Eeva Kilpi, the Finnish feminist writer, who was a child in Karelia at the time.

== Release ==
Fire and Ice was shown on PBS stations around the U.S. circa February 2006. It has also been released on DVD.

== Awards ==
The film was selected as the best documentary at the Minneapolis-St. Paul International Film Festival in 2006. Strout received an Emmy as director from the Lower Great Lakes Chapter of the National Academy of Television Arts and Sciences in 2007. In 2005 The New York Times named him as a Critic's Pick Director, and named editor Kurt Poole as Critic's Pick Editor.
