= The Winter War (film) =

1989 Finnish film by Pekka Parikka

- Finnish DVD cover
- Directed by: Pekka Parikka
- Written by: Pekka Parikka; Antti Tuuri
- Based on: Talvisota by Antti Tuuri
- Produced by: Marko Röhr
- Starring: Taneli Mäkelä; Vesa Vierikko; Timo Torikka; Mika Heikki Paavilainen; Antti Raivio; Esko Kovero; Martti Suosalo; Markku Huhtamo; Konsta Mäkelä
- Distributed by: National-Filmi
- Release dates: 30 November 1989 (Finland); December 1989 (U.S.)
- Running time: 127 minutes (international cut); 197 minutes (Finnish theatrical cut); 266 minutes (Finnish TV series)
- Country: Finland
- Language: Finnish
- Box office: 628,767 admissions (Finland)

The Winter War (Finnish: Talvisota) is a 1989 Finnish war film directed by Pekka Parikka, and based on the 1984 novel Talvisota by Antti Tuuri. It is set in the 1939 Winter War and tells the story of a Finnish infantry regiment from Southern Ostrobothnia fighting on the Karelian Isthmus, focusing mainly on a platoon of reservists from Kauhava.

The Winter War was released in Finland on 30 November 1989. It was Finland's most popular film with over 600,000 admissions. It won six Jussi Awards and was Finland's entry for the Best Foreign Language Film at the 63rd Academy Awards, but was not accepted as a nominee.

== Plot ==
On 13 October 1939, reservists of the Finnish Army are called up for active duty as the threat of Soviet invasion becomes likely. Martti and Paavo Hakala, two farmer brothers from Kauhava, Southern Ostrobothnia, join other men from the municipality in a half-platoon under the command of Second Lieutenant Jussi Kantola. After mustering at the local school, the men ride the train to Seinäjoki to join the rest of the Finnish Army's 23rd Regiment, under the command of Lieutenant-Colonel Matti Laurila. After weeks of practice, the regiment goes to the Karelian Isthmus, where Kantola's men help civilians evacuate their village in the potential war zone. Laurila gives a speech to the regiment before marching to the Taipale River, where Kantola's men help in building defenses in preparation for the anticipated Soviet attack.

On 6 December, the Battle of Taipale begins on Finnish Independence Day, and the Finns are shelled by Soviet artillery advancing to the frontline. The Red Army gathers outside the Finnish trenches, and the next day the Finns are strafed by the Soviet Air Force as the Red Army launches a human wave attack with T-26s, but hold them back. Paavo is wounded and sent home, where he attends the funeral of four Kauhava men killed in the attack. Paavo recovers and returns to the front, but is soon killed in a direct hit from Soviet artillery in front of Martti. Several times, the Soviets attack and enter the Finnish trenches, but the Finns manage to push them back. Kantola is ordered to retake a casemate captured by the Soviets when he left it unattended, with the Finns driving out the Soviets but suffering high casualties in the assault and destroying the casemate. On 27 December, the Soviets halt their attack on the Taipale front and Kantola's men go to Yläjärvi for rest and recuperation, and Martti manages to get home leave.

When Martti returns, the unit goes to Vuosalmi near the village of Äyräpää to prevent the Soviets from crossing the Vuoksi River. The Finns try to fend off Soviet human wave attacks but are overwhelmed and Martti is almost killed when a Soviet soldier buttstrokes him, forcing the Finns to retreat. On 5 March, Martti, Kantola and the surviving Finns cover a counterattack by the men of Nurmo, but a delay allows the Soviets to get into an advantaged position. The Finns face more human wave attacks and are overwhelmed by the mass of Soviet soldiers. On the morning of 13 March, the Finns are almost overrun when the fighting stops at eleven o’clock as the Moscow Peace Treaty takes effect.

== Cast ==
- Taneli Mäkelä - Private Martti Hakala, a farmer and a competent soldier. While the regiment is waiting near Taipale he plows the fields of a farmer who has gone to Rautu to build fortifications.
- Vesa Vierikko - 2nd Lieutenant Jussi Kantola, Martti's immediate superior. He puts Paavo into Martti's squad at Martti's request.
- Timo Torikka - Private Pentti Saari. He is usually eating something or playing his mandolin. He often complains about the lack of food.
- Heikki Paavilainen - Private Vilho Erkkilä. Looking like a college student, he quotes patriotic poetry on the train. He is Martti and Paavo's half brother.
- Antti Raivio - Corporal Erkki Somppi. The shortest man and leader of the 1st Squad in Kantola's half-platoon, he first appears issuing belts and cockades to the men at Kauhava School.
- Esko Kovero - Medical Corporal Juho “Jussi” Pernaa, the half-platoon's medic.
- Martti Suosalo - Private Arvi Huhtala, a skirt-chaser who smokes cigarettes with built-in holders and combs his hair when he's nervous.
- Markku Huhtamo - Private Aatos Laitila. An older and pious man, he finds humor in taking Soviet propaganda leaflets for “a little wipe”.
- Matti Onnismaa - Corporal Veikko Korpela. A skilled machine-gunner, he gets blasted by a flamethrower tank, but survives, only mildly singed.
- Konsta Mäkelä - Private Paavo Hakala, Martti's younger brother.
- Tomi Salmela - Private Matti Ylinen, Anna Ylinen's older brother. On the train, he drinks liquor from a bottle Pentti claims is his. He carries a blue wind-up clock, whose ticking seems to calm his nerves.
- Samuli Edelmann - Private Mauri Haapasalo, a replacement who is so unprepared that Aatos gives him his gloves.
- Vesa Mäkelä - Lieutenant Yrjö Haavisto, aide-de-camp to Col. Laurila.
- Aarno Sulkanen - Captain Kustaa Sihvo. He comes to the dugout to chew Kantola out when Russians take an unattended bunker.
- Kari Kihlström - Lieutenant Jorma Potila. He stands with Colonel Laurila as Laurila inspires the troops.
- Esko Salminen - Lieutenant-Colonel Matti Laurila, commanding officer of the 23rd Regiment of the Finnish Army.
- Ari-Kyösti Seppo - Private Ahti Saari, Pentti Saari's younger brother. He is naive and inexperienced, so the act of killing Russians distresses him.
- Kari Sorvali - Sergeant-Major Hannu Jutila. As a logistics officer, his first act is to find a field kitchen that has gone missing.
- Esko Nikkari - Private Yrjö “Ylli” Alanen, an older, experienced soldier who is almost always whittling a piece of wood. His participation in Finland's Civil War of 1918 gives him an insouciance regarding combat.
- Ville Virtanen - 2nd Lieutenant Jaakko Rajala, an arrogant officer who bears a grudge against Martti for a minor act of insubordination. He becomes more humble as he witnesses the true nature of war.
- Pirkko Hämäläinen - Marjatta Hakala, Martti's wife.
- Leena Suomu - Liisa Hakala, Martti and Paavo's mother. She has asked Martti to watch over Paavo.
- Tarja Heinula - Anna Ylinen, Paavo's fiancée and Matti Ylinen's sister.
- Miitta Sorvali - Karelian hostess.

== Production ==
=== Military hardware ===
The film depicts a wide array of genuine wartime vehicles and artillery; and when these were not available, replicas were used:

- T-26; Light infantry tank (Soviet)
- Tupolev SB; Twin-engine fast bomber (Soviet)
- Polikarpov I-16; Single engine, single seat fighter used for strafing runs (Soviet)
- PstK/36; 37-mm anti-tank gun (Finnish)

Animated special effects were used to simulate tracer projectiles.

=== Music ===
In addition to the main title and the incidental music, five pieces play an important role in the film:

- Vilppulan urhojen muistolle is the march sung by Finnish troops as the 23rd Regiment marches out of Seinäjoki.
- Oi Emma is a traditional Finnish waltz, in which the singer laments the behavior of a perfidious woman. It is the first tune that Pentti Saari plays on his mandolin.
- Ah Jeesus Kristus armahda is the hymn played in Kauhava cathedral at the funeral in the middle of the film. It's Virsi 587 in the official 1938 hymnbook (Virsikirja) of the Evangelical Lutheran Church of Finland.
- Enkeli taivaan is the Christmas hymn sung by the men.
- Ich spür in mir (I feel in me) is from Mazurka (1935), a German film about a singer put on trial for murdering a predatory musician. Pentti plays it on his mandolin and the soldiers whistle it to express their displeasure at a situation that an officer has created.

== Awards ==
Pekka Parikka was nominated for the Golden Bear at the 40th Berlin International Film Festival in 1990.

At the Jussi Awards (Finland's premier film awards) the same year, Talvisota received six awards:

- Best Actor: Taneli Mäkelä
- Best Co-ordinator: Raimo Mikkola
- Best Direction: Pekka Parikka
- Best Music: Juha Tikka
- Best Sound Recording: Paul Jyrälä and team
- Best Supporting Actor: Vesa Vierikko

Taneli Mäkelä also won Best Actor, for his role in the film, at the Rouen Nordic Film Festival.

== Different versions and home video ==
There are three cuts of the film, inspired by the different versions of similarly acclaimed Germen war film Das Boot (1981), and followed by The Unknown Soldier (2017).

- International theatrical cut (127 minutes)
- Finnish theatrical cut (197 minutes)
- Finnish TV series (266 minutes at 24 fps)

The TV series incorporates additional footage and consists of five episodes, each with a running time of around 55 minutes. It has been broadcast domestically four times on Yle TV2, in 1991, 1999, 2009 and 2015.

The abridged international cut was released on VHS and DVD in various non-Finnish countries, and Blu-ray in Germany. The Finnish theatrical version had a 4k digital restoration in 2013, since released on Finnish DVD; Blu-ray in Finland, Germany and Japan; and streaming internationally. The TV version has only been released on a Finnish 2-DVD set.

== See also ==
- Rukajärven tie, a 1999 film adapted from another Antti Tuuri novel, about Finland's Continuation War
- The Unknown Soldier, 1955 film
  - The Unknown Soldier, 1985 film
  - The Unknown Soldier, 2017 film
- List of submissions to the 63rd Academy Awards for Best Foreign Language Film
- List of Finnish submissions for the Academy Award for Best Foreign Language Film
- Winter War in popular culture
- Tuuri, Antti: Talvisota: kertomus (The Winter War: A Report), Otava (Helsinki), 1984. ISBN 978-951-1-23866-9
