= Parland =

Parland is a surname. Notable people with the surname include:

- Alfred Parland (1842–1919), Russian architect
- David Parland (1970–2013), Swedish musician
- Henry Parland (1908–1930), Finnish poet
- Oscar Parland (1912–1997), Finnish Swedish author, translator, and psychiatrist
- Ralf Parland (1914–1995), Finnish writer, translator, and music critic

== See also ==
- McParland
