= Abez, Komi Republic =

Abez Абезь
- Settlement
- Location within Komi Republic Location within Russia
- Coordinates: 66°31′N 61°45′E
- Country: Russia
- Region: Komi Republic
- Municipality: Inta Municipality
- Time zone: [[UTC+3:00]]

Abez (Russian: Абезь) is a rural locality (a settlement) in Inta Municipality, Komi Republic, Russia. The population was 478 as of 2010. There are 11 streets.

From 1932 to 1959 there was the Abez camp, a special camp for the disabled, where many eminent people were imprisoned and died. And see the burial ground.

== Geography ==
The settlement is located on the right bank of the Usa River, 205 km northeast of Inta (the district's administrative centre) by road. Fion is the nearest rural locality.

== Died in the camp ==
- Lev Karsavin, a philosopher and historian.
- Hryhoriy Lakota, a Ukrainian priest.
- Der Nister, a Yiddish writer.
- Nikolai Punin, Russian literary specialist.
