= Malakhovka, Moscow Oblast =

Malakhovka Малаховка
- Work settlement
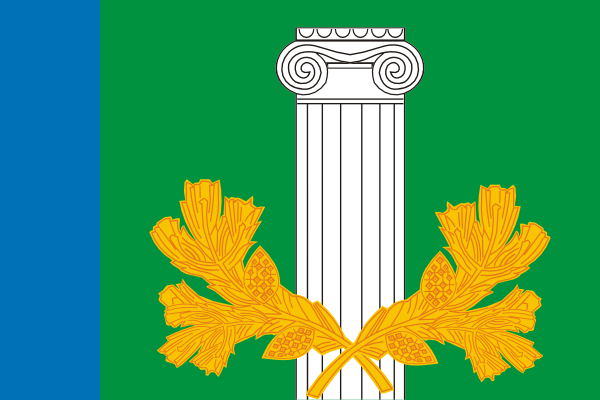
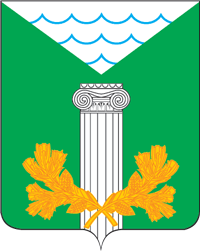
- Flag Coat of arms
- Anthem: Anthem of Malakhovka
- Interactive map of Malakhovka
- Location of Malakhovka Malakhovka (Moscow Oblast)
- Coordinates: 55°38′37″N 38°00′32″E
- Country: Russia
- Federal subject: Moscow Oblast
- Administrative district: Lyuberetsky District
- First mentioned: 1328
- Urban-type settlement status since: 1961

Government
  - Body: Council of Deputies
  - Head: Alexander Avtayev
- Elevation: 138 m (453 ft)

Population (2010 Census)
  - Total: 24,004
  - Estimate (2025): 25,898 (+7.9%)

Municipal status
  - Municipal district: Lyuberetsky Municipal District
  - Urban settlement: Malakhovka Urban Settlement
  - Capital of: Malakhovka Urban Settlement
- Time zone: UTC+3 (MSK)
- Postal code: 140030
- OKTMO ID: 46748000061
- Website: malahovka.net

Malakhovka (Russian: Мала́ховка), a Moscow suburb renowned for its historic dachas, is an urban locality (a work settlement) in Lyuberetsky District of Moscow Oblast, Russia. Population: 24,004 (2010 census); 18,552 (2002 census); 26,454 (1989 Soviet census).

== History ==
Under the name Malakhovskoye (Мала́ховское), Malakhovka was first mentioned in 1328 in Ivan Kalita's will as a place left to Ivan's older son Semyon.

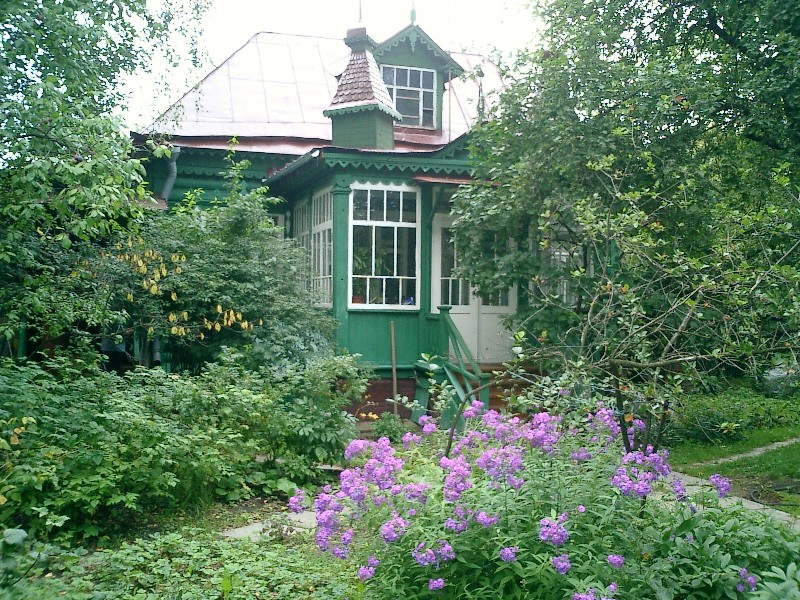
A Pre-revolutionary Dacha in Malakhovka

With the completion of a railway station in 1884 Malakhovka was recognized as a dacha settlement. By the end of 19th century, the settlement was inhabited by such renowned representatives of Russian arts and literature as Anton Chekhov, Maxim Gorky, Ivan Bunin, and Feodor Chaliapin. Chaliapin performed in the Malakhovka's Summer Theater before 1914. The actress Faina Ranevskaya performed there from the following year, and also had a dacha there. At the time of the Revolution Malakhovka was a described as a "hamlet" of about three hundred dachas.

In the late 1950s, the town's synagogue was burned down on the eve of the Jewish New Year, killing an old Jewish woman.

Urban-type settlement status was granted to Malakhovka in 1961.

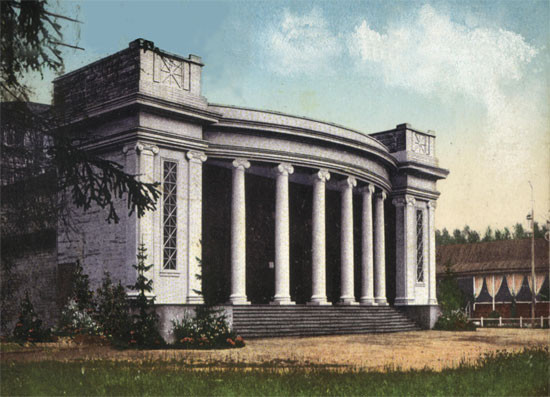
Pearl of country theatres of Russia, Malakhovsky Summer Theatre. Designed by the architect Leon Dauksha in the characteristic modernist style of the era. Built in 1911 on the initiative of F. Chaliapin. Burned in 1999 as a result of arson.

== Administrative and municipal status ==
Within the framework of administrative divisions, Malakhovka is incorporated within Lyuberetsky District of Moscow Oblast. Within the framework of municipal divisions, Malakhovka is a part of a larger Malakhovka Urban Settlement, which, in addition to Malakhovka proper, also includes the village of Pekhorka and adjacent territories.

== Economy and infrastructure ==
The Malakhovka railway station is located 29 kilometers (18 mi) southeast from Moscow. The settlement has minor industry: an ore mining equipment factory and a food processing plant. There are also two sanatoriums, a history museum, an Orthodox church, and a synagogue.

== Media ==
Malakhovka has a local newspaper, Malakhovsky Vestnik (Малаховский Вестник, "Malakhovka Herald").

== Notable people ==
Marc Chagall taught at a Jewish boys shelter (mainly for refugees from Ukrainian pogroms) here in 1921, did the illustrations for David Hofstein's long poem "Troyer" (Grief) and worked on his mural "Introduction to the Jewish Theater". The refuge was a center for many Yiddish writers including Der Nister, who lived with Chagall, David Hofstein, Moshe Lifshits and Itzik Feffer.

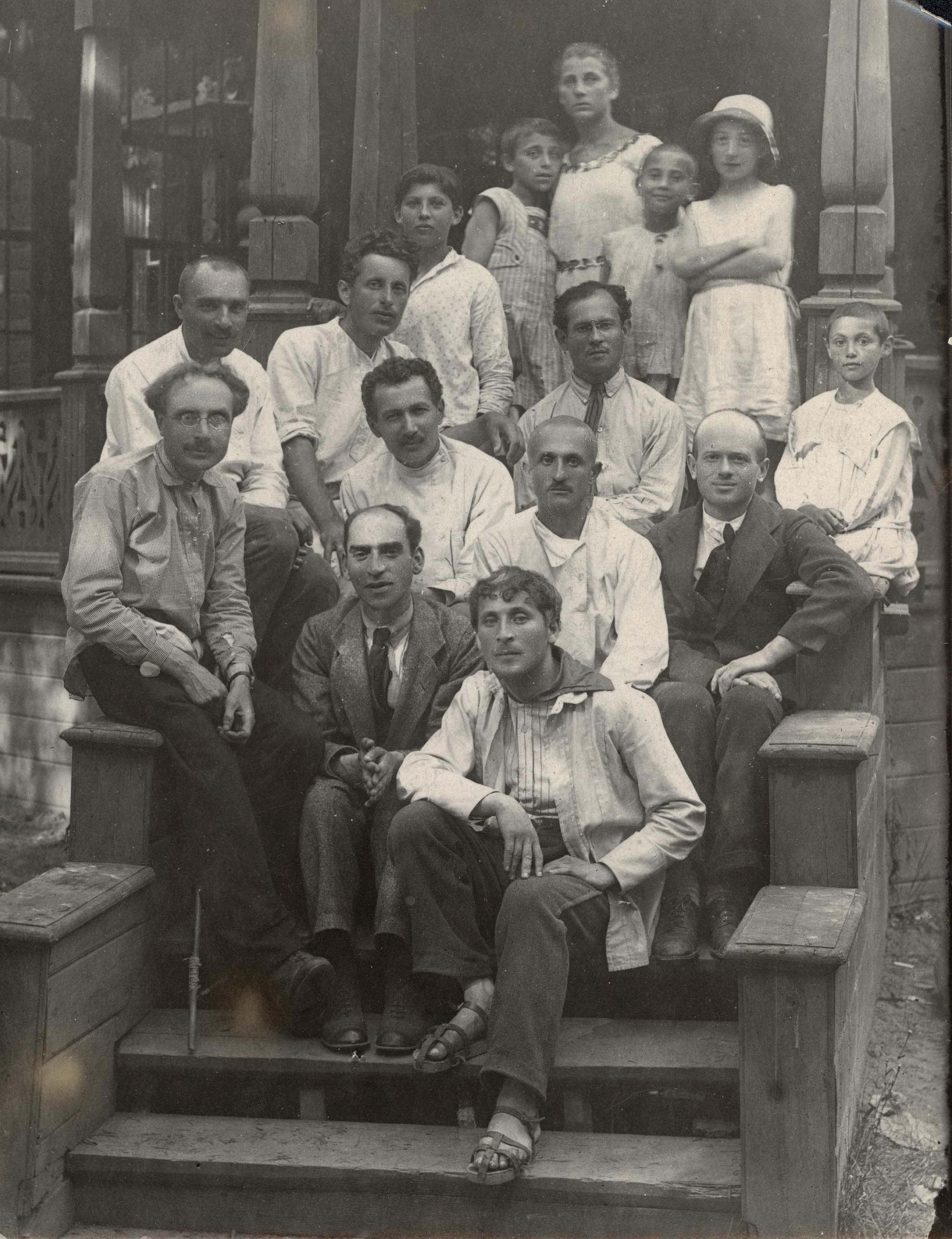
Chagal (front) and Der Nister (behind) at the Malakhovka boys shelter

The Soviet writer and USSR State Prize Laureate Nikolay Dobronravov (husband of Aleksandra Pakhmutova) went to school in Malakhovka during the war. The Olympic and World champion runner Irina Privalova was born in Malakhovka.

An early (1959) poem by Andrey Voznesensky is "Last Train to Malakhovka", regarding his regular trips to the settlement.
