= Ralf Parland =

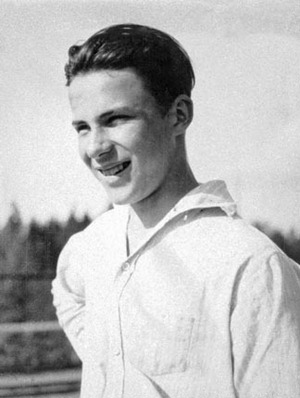
- The young Ralf Parland.
- Born: Ralf Fredrik Tomas Parland; June 21, 1914; Vyborg, Finland
- Died: May 22, 1995 (aged 80); Stockholm, Sweden
- Occupations: Writer, translator, music critic, journalist
- Spouse(s): Eva Wichman; Heli Gestrin; Helga Henschen
- Relatives: Henry Parland (brother); Oscar Parland (brother); Oswald Frank Parland (father); Ida Maria Sesemann (mother)
- Writing career
- Language: Swedish
- Period: 1934–1995
- Genres: Poetry, prose
- Notable awards: Swedish Radio Poetry Prize (1966); Ferlin Prize (1989); Finnish State Prize for Literature (1953, 1956); Längmanska Cultural Foundation Prize (1960)
- Movement: Modernism

Ralf Thomas Friedrich Parland (21 June 1914 – 22 May 1995) was a Swedish-speaking Finn writer, translator, and music critic. He wrote short stories, poetry, and essays, and is associated with the second wave of Finland-Swedish modernism. He was the younger brother of Henry Parland and Oscar Parland.

Parland was the son of physician Oswald Frank Parland and Ida Maria Sesemann. He completed his matriculation examination at Grankulla samskola in 1932. Early in his career he also worked as a journalist and music critic.

Parland made his debut in 1934 with Dusch, a collection of prose pieces characterized by fantasy and linguistic delight. Although he published further prose works, it was as a modernist poet that he became most prominent. Parland ceased publishing after 1973.

From 1948 onward he lived in Sweden. He was first married to Eva Wichman, with whom he had a son, then to Heli Gestrin, and later to Helga Henschen.

== Bibliography ==
- Ebonit. Helsinki: Söderströms. 1937. SELIBR 1804273
- Avstånd. Helsinki: Söderströms. 1938. SELIBR 2204476
- Abel y Aifars sånger. Helsinki: Söderströms. 1941. SELIBR 2204473
- Mot morgondag: En åhörares betraktelser om musik. Helsinki: Söderströms. 1942. SELIBR 1538124
- Mot fullbordan. Helsinki: Söderström. 1944. SELIBR 1821044
- Oavslutad människa: dikter och legender. Helsinki: Söderströms. 1946. SELIBR 1744014
- Himlens stenar: noveller. Helsinki: Söderströms. 1947. SELIBR 1680152
- Nattens eldar: dikter 1938–1948. Stockholm: Bonniers. 1949. SELIBR 1404202
- Relief: dikter. Stockholm: KF. 1950. SELIBR 1404203
- Brev till ett tomrum. Stockholm: KF. 1951. SELIBR 1445475
- Hårt ljus: noveller. Stockholm: LT. 1952. SELIBR 1445478
- Det blåser ur intet: dikter. Stockholm: LT. 1953. SELIBR 1445476
- Eros och elektronerna. Helsinki: Söderströms. 1953. SELIBR 671187
- De två vägarna: prosa i urval. Stockholm: LT. 1954. SELIBR 1445479
- Eolita: [dikter]. Stockholm: LT. 1956. SELIBR 695180
- Hem till sitt hav: karelska noveller om mycket vatten. Stockholm: LT. 1957. SELIBR 1974512
- Hymner från Santsche-Pi. Stockholm: LT. 1959. SELIBR 702593
- Tolv onklars resa. Helsinki: Söderströms. 1960
- (in Finnish) Kahdentoista enon reissu. 1960
- Zodiaken: en diktsvit. Stockholm: Bokkonsum. 1961. SELIBR 702595
- En apa for till himmelen. Stockholm: LT. 1961. SELIBR 702596
- Sonat för fallskärm och kalebass. Stockholm: LT. 1964. SELIBR 702588
- En hundpredikan. Stockholm: LT. 1966. SELIBR 702591
- Bländverket: dramatiskt poem i tre satser. Stockholm: LT. 1968. SELIBR 7948
- Regnbågens död. Helsinki. 1970.
- I: en roman om förhävelsen. Stockholm: LT. 1973. SELIBR 7251473 ISBN 978-91-36-00322-2

== Selected translations ==
- Valeriu Marcu: Machiavelli: renässansmänniskan och maktfilosofen (Machiavelli, die Schule der Macht) (Natur & Kultur, 1939)
- Illés Kaczér: Svart blir aldrig vitt (Pao) (Fritzes, 1941). Published in Finland as Svart erotik
- Antti W. Heikkinen: En vagabond (Smia, 1946)
- Olavi Paavolainen: Finlandia i moll: Dagboksblad från åren 1941–1944 (partial translation with Lars Hjalmarsson Dahl and Atos Wirtanen) (Holger Schildt, 1947)
- Johann Wolfgang von Goethe: Den unge Werthers lidanden (Die Leiden des jungen Werthers) (Tiden, 1949)
- Carl Pidoll: Sista symfonin: roman om Beethoven (Verklungenes Spiel) (Natur & Kultur, 1955)
- Robert Musil: Tre kvinnor (Drei Frauen) (Tiden, 1957)
- Norbert Kunze: Den sista bron (Die letzte Brücke) (translated with Brita Edfelt, Natur & Kultur, 1965)
- Esther Vilar: Den dresserade mannen (Der dressierte Mann) (Askild & Kärnekull, 1972)
- Eeva Kilpi: Tamara (Tamara) (Askild & Kärnekull, 1974)
- Reima Kampman: Du är inte ensam: en undersökning av människans sidopersoner (Et ole yksin) (Askild & Kärnekull, 1976)
- Daniel Katz: Orvar Kleins död (Orvar Kleinin kuolema) (Rabén & Sjögren, 1978)
- Peter Rosei: Utanför (Von hier nach dort) (Rabén & Sjögren, 1980)
- Eeva Kilpi: Tamara (Tamara) (Fripress, 1985)

== Awards and Honors ==
- 1953 – Finnish State Prize for Literature
- 1956 – Finnish State Prize for Literature
- 1960 – Längmanska Cultural Foundation Prize
- 1966 – Swedish Radio Poetry Prize
- 1989 – Ferlin Prize
