= Abez camp =

Abez camp Абезьский лагерь
- Gulag labor camp
- Location within Komi Republic Location within Russia
- Coordinates: 66°31′N 61°45′E
- Country: Russia
- Region: Komi Republic
- Municipality: Inta Municipality
- Time zone: [[UTC+3:00]]

The Abez camp (Russian: Абезьский лагерь), Abezlag (Абезьлаг); full name: Abez camp detachment (Russian: Абезьское лагерное отделение) was a subdivision in the Gulag labor camp system (Abez camp for disabled, Russian: Абезьского инвалидного лагеря). It was established in the settlement of Abez, Komi Republic, Russia. It was a special camp for disabled inmates coming from various camps of Gulag.

Initially it was established as the Abez transit camp and had several camp points. Eventually it was subordinated to Minlag.

The memorial cemetery and museum of Abez camp was established in Abez by the initiative of the Memorial society in 1989.

== People ==
=== Notable inmates ===
- Nikolay Punin, art scholar and writer, common-law husband of poet Anna Akhmatova
- Lina Prokofiev
- Lev Karsavin, religious philosopher, historian-medievalist, and poet
- Eugenia Taratuta
- Jonas Juodišius, Lithuanian Brigadier General, later Soviet Major General, died in the camp on December 18, 1950 His sons, Paulius and Jonas, installed a monument "To those Who Did Not Return" at the Abez memorial cemetery
- Zvi Preigerzon, Ukrainian Jewish author and researcher; released in December 1955 but voluntarily stayed in Vorkuta until 1957 to finish his research
- Hryhoriy Lakota, Ukrainian Greek-Catholic Church auxiliary bishop
- Ivan Feshchenko-Chopivs'kyy, Ukrainian scientist metallurgist, public and political figure, minister of the Central Rada and Directory
- Vassily Sinaisky, Russian conductor and pianist. He was born in the camp, where his parents were imprisoned.
- Dionizy Kajetanowicz, Polish capitular vicar, protonotary apostolic, the last administrator of the Archdiocese of Lviv of the Armenian rite
- Der Nister, Yiddish author, philosopher, translator, and critic
- Iekhezkiel Dobrushin (1883-1953), Jewish (Yiddish) playwright, theater scholar and teacher
- Vladislav Dashkevich-Gorbatsky (1879-1952), "White Russian" general
- Ivan Paslavsky (1895-1947), journalist, Ukrainian public figure in "Green Ukraine", Russian Far East
- uk:Багмут Іван Адріанович
- uk:Федущак Інна Вікторівна
- uk:Павло Олінський
- uk:Осадца Михайло Іванович
- uk:Горинь Ольга Павлівна
- uk:Куйбіда Катерина Михайлівна
- uk:Куйбіда Степан Олексійович
- uk:Содомора Микола Григорович
- ru:Коноплин, Иван Степанович
- ru:Симуков, Андрей Дмитриевич
- ru:Сорокин, Григорий Эммануилович
- ru:Сваринскас, Альфонсас
- ru:Яворка, Венделин Михайлович
- ru:Добрушин, Иехезкель Моисеевич
- ru:Трофимов, Евгений Никитович
- ru:Галкин, Самуил Залманович
- ru:Гробер, Хая-Елена Самуиловна
- ru:Василенко, Виктор Михайлович
- ru:Котляр, Соломон Осипович
- ru:Колеров, Вячеслав Аркадьевич
- ru:Баркова, Анна Александровна
- ru:Гениюш, Лариса Антоновна
- ru:Дашкевич-Горбацкий, Владислав Владиславович
- ru:Леони, Пьетро (Pietro Leoni)
- ru:Иоанн (Стрельцов)
- ru:Дробинский, Яков Израйлевич
- Sophia Radek, daughter of Karl Radek

=== Other ===
- Russian writer Arkady Gaidar worked for 11 months as an economist in the camp, being unable to secure other work elsewhere.
