= Zvi Preigerzon =

Ukrainian Jewish author

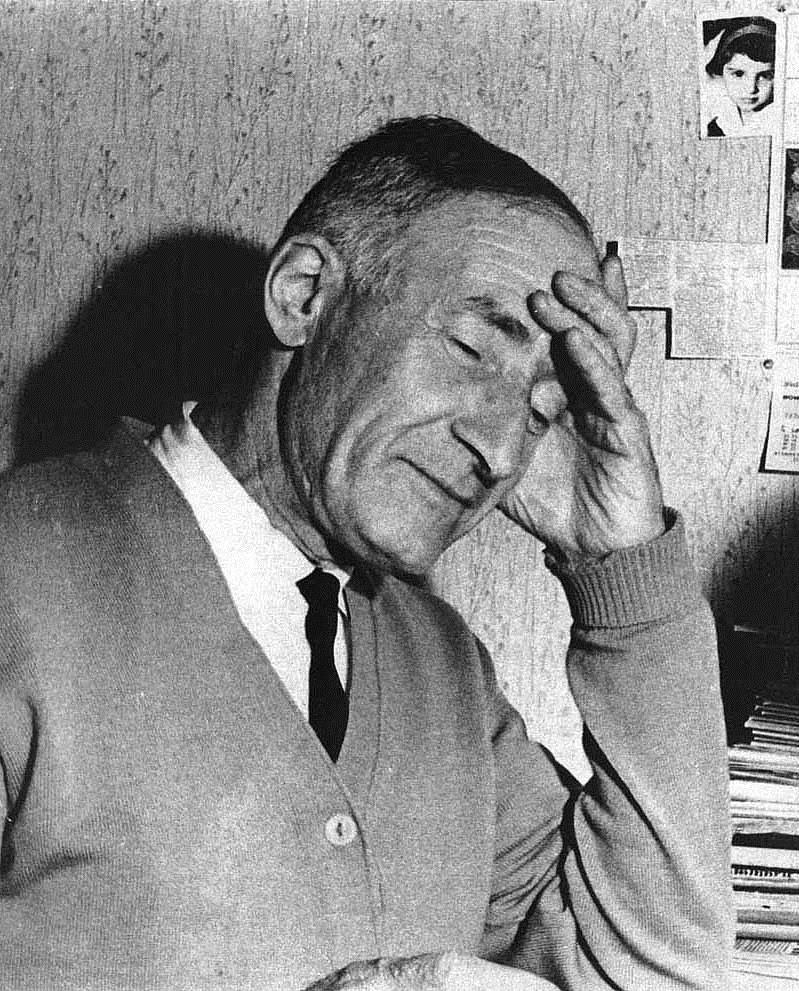
- Zvi Preigerzon in 1968
- Born: Grigory Izrailevich Preigerzon; October 26, 1900; Shepetivka, Russian Empire
- Died: March 15, 1969 (aged 68); Moscow, USSR
- Resting place: Shefayim Cemetery, Central District, Israel
- Occupations: Short-story writer, heritage writer, novelist, poet, engineer, scientist
- Spouse: Lea Preigerzon (1903–1986)
- Children: Athaliah (Asya) Preigerzon (1928–2015); Nina Priegerzon (1930–present day); Benjamin Preigerzon (1937–2012)
- Writing career
- Pen name: A. Tsefoni / Tsfoni א. צפוני
- Period: 1920–1960
- Genres: prose, historical prose, memoirs
- Notable works: "The Perpetual Fire (Tel Aviv 1966) / When The Lamp Fades (Moscow - 2014)"; "Memoirs of a Gulag Prisoner (Moscow - Jerusalem 2005)"; "The Burden of a Name (St. Petersburg - 1999"; "An Unfinished Story (Jerusalem - 2011)"

Signature
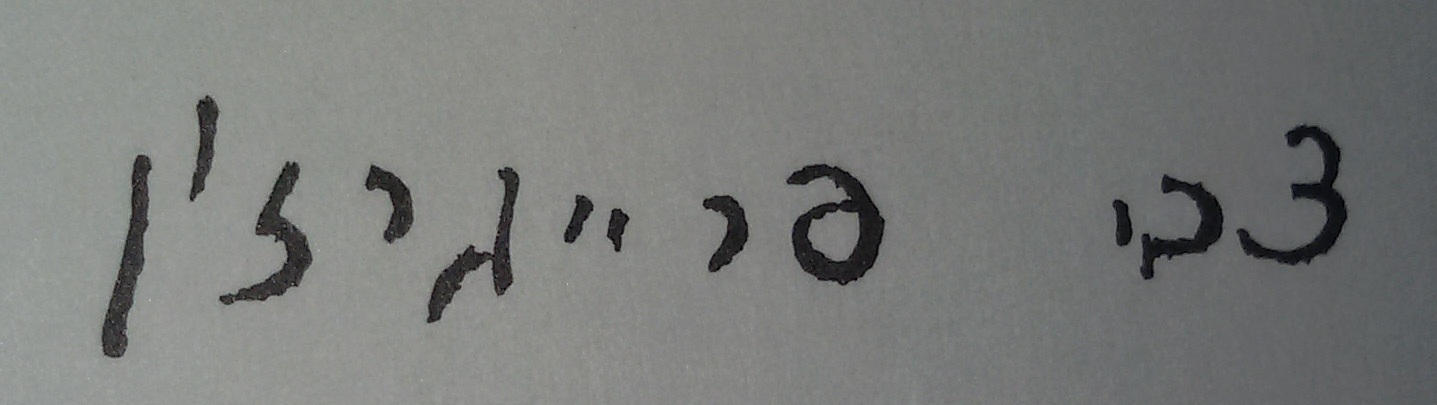

Zvi-Gersh Preigerzon (October 26, 1900 – March 15, 1969) was a Ukrainian Jewish author who specialized in historical prose of a historically fictional nature. He wrote books in Hebrew in the Soviet Union – which caused his arrest. Preigerzon was also a scientist and inventor in the mineral processing field, and was named Dean of the Moscow State Mining University.

By the early 1920s Zvi's writing has become the focal point of his life. The author wrote his books and short stories in secrecy and in constant fear of arrest by the Soviet authorities. These were partially published in overseas Hebrew / Zionist periodicals between 1927 and 1934; it was only in the 1960s that Zvi's books and stories saw publication in Israel with a vast majority of the works being published after his death. In the early 2000s his books were gifted to, and accepted by, the Library of Congress; the library misspells the author's last name as Preigerson instead of Preigerzon; their archive can be viewed here. A further catalogue of works is also available at the Russian State Library, this catalogue includes some of the author's engineering works and is available here (in Russian)

Because of the nature and location of his work and his usage of the pen name A. Tsefoni / Tsfoni, Zvi Preigerzon never saw any commercial success from his writings during life and never sought it. After his death all of his works were translated into Russian and there exists an initiative to have an English translation completed as well.

Several Jewish authors have referenced Zvi Preigerson and his books in their works, namely: Jehoshua A. Gilboa, Yosef Govrin, Yaacov Ro'i, Mordechai Altshuler and Moshe Shamir.

== Early life ==
=== Childhood and family ===
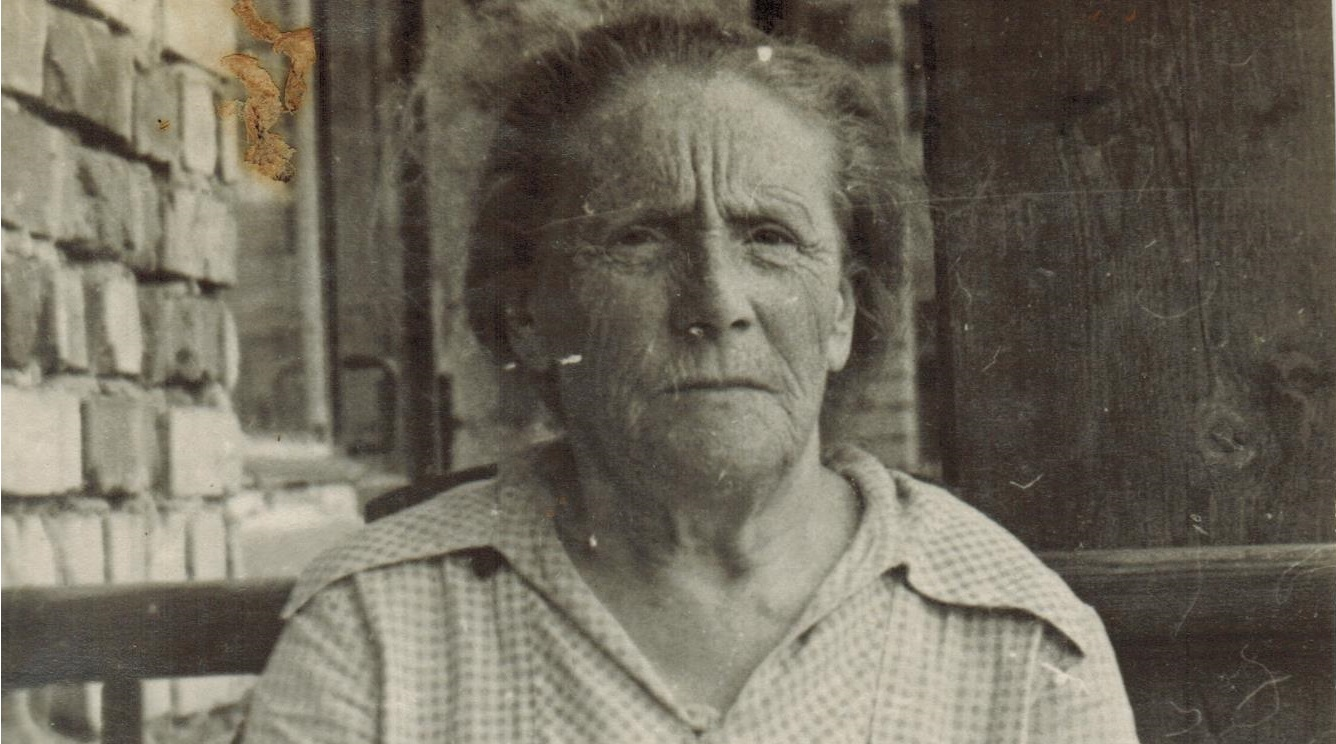
Zvi Preigerzon's mother Rachel Preigerzon (maiden name Rachel Galperina)

Zvi-Gersh (or Hirsh) Preigerzon was born on October 26, 1900, in his family home at Shepetivka, Khmelnytskyi Oblast, in what is today a part of western Ukraine. One of three brothers born to Israel Preigerzon (1872–1922) of Krasyliv – a small businessman in the cloth industry, and Rachel (Raisa) nee Galperina (1872–1922) also of Krasyliv. Rachel was of the Volhynia line of Rabbi Dov-Ber Karasik. Zvi's parents gave the future author a traditional religious education; the family celebrated Jewish traditions and spoke Hebrew and Yiddish. Zvi's father made it his task to introduce his children to "new" Hebrew literature and commonly read from the works of Abraham Mapu and Judah Leib Gordon and Jewish periodicals of those days.

From the days of his early childhood, Zvi had developed a profound appreciation of the Hebrew language and was known to muse that (in translation) "the Jewish thrill has poisoned my blood forever". This phrase can be found used again in his book Hevlei Shem (Burden of a Name).

=== Palestine and World War I ===
Given his passion to the language and Jewish themes it came as no surprise when Zvi started writing poems and short stories in Hebrew. Seeing the passion of his son, Israel sent Zvi's notebooks to Hayim Nahman Bialik in Odessa. Impressed, Mr. Bialik commented on the talents of the young author and recommended that he be given a solid education in Hebrew. Following this advice, in 1913 the boy was sent to Palestine to attend the prestigious Herzliya Hebrew Gymnasium (currently located in Tel Aviv), where all instruction was conducted in Hebrew.

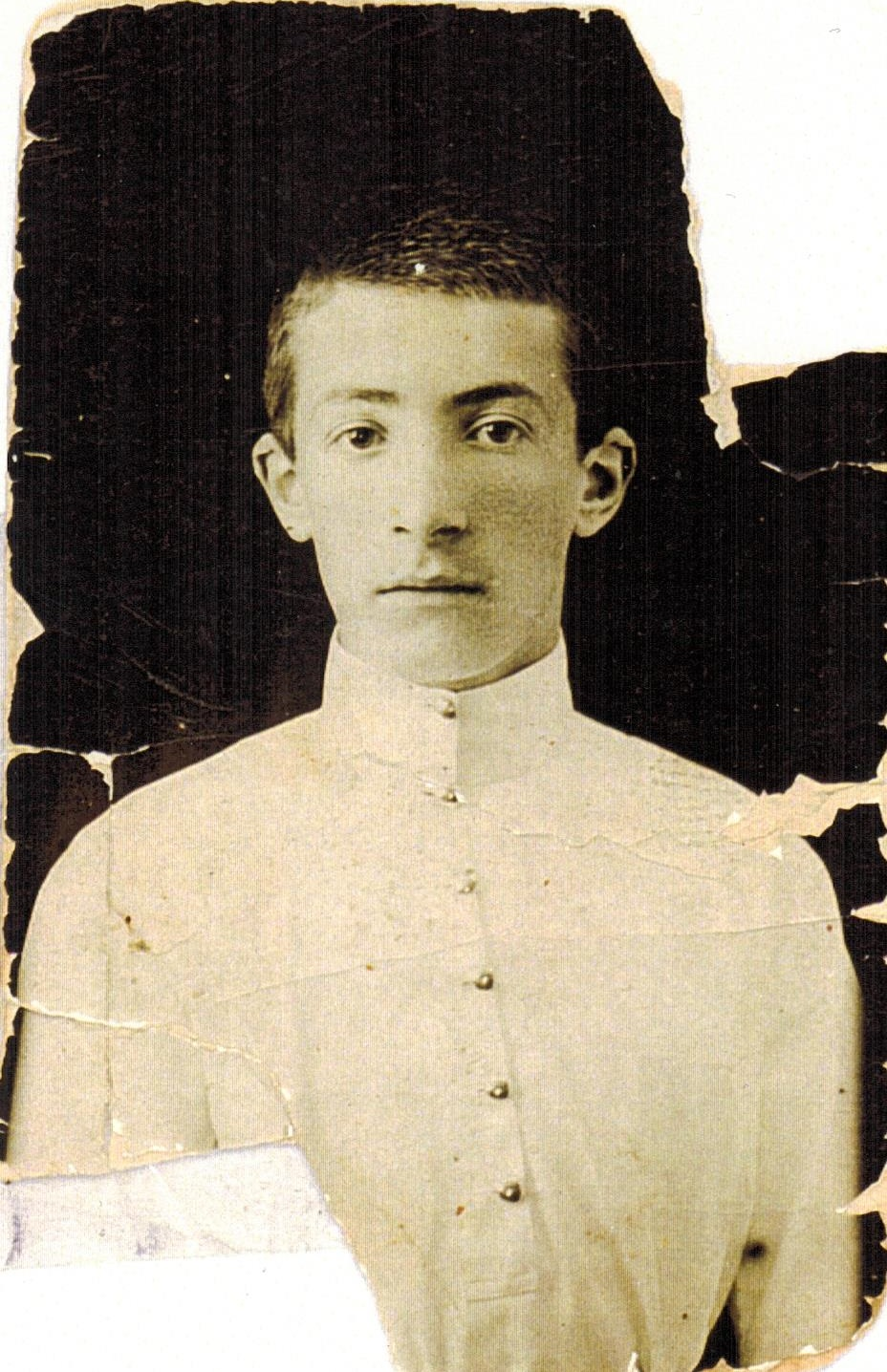
Zvi Preigerzon at Herzliya Academy, 1913

As recapped in his book Unfinished Story Zvi arrived in Palestine on the Steamship Yerushalayim (Jerusalem) with a group of other students bound for the school which the author attended for one year. During his stay, the young writer strengthened his language skills and gained a profound appreciation for the Holy Land and its people and their songs. He also attributed his belief in the necessity of a Jewish state to this early time and wrote that only such a state would allow his fellow Jews to be forever free from persecution, humiliation and suffering. Zvi was well aware of these atrocities through the Ukrainian pogroms.

Because of his illness Zvi was sent back home for the 1914 summer holidays but could never return to his beloved school as on August the 14th World War I had started – with the Russian Empire and Ottoman Empire (occupying Palestine) being belligerents towards one another. Zvi instead continued his education in Odessa and upon passing the entry exams at the age of fifteen was admitted to Lublinska Academy as the school was relocated from Poland at the start of the war. Admission to the school was allowed for the children of Jewish refugee families – exactly the position in which the Preigerzon family found itself in.

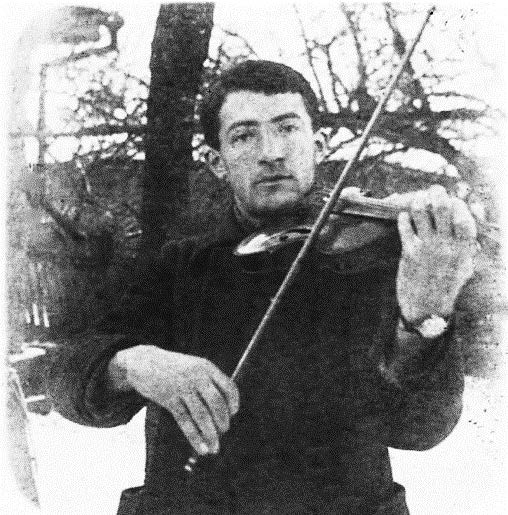
Zvi Preigerzon – Music Conservatory graduate

During those uneasy years Zvi graduated from a local Music Conservatory as a violin player, yet he never relinquished his love of the Hebrew language. In the evenings he was known to visit the Yeshiva of Chaim Tchernowitz (better known as The Young Rabbi or Rav Zair). It is at this Yeshiva that Zvi was mentored by Hayim Nahman Bialik who was responsible for the young author's visit to the Holy Land and by the Jewish historian Joseph Klausner. It was in this very institute where Zvi had committed to his life work of Hebrew literature.

Shortly after the 1917 October Revolution the newly forming Soviet Union would outlaw Hebrew and create the conditions for Hebrew literary endeavors becoming an illegal and dangerous activity. Zvi faced a major dilemma: a choice between getting a higher education he so much desired and immigrating to Palestine. His decision would shape the rest of his life as he chooses to pursue his education, acquire a profession and only than depart for Palestine; not knowing that very soon World War II and the Iron Curtain would make such departure impossible.

== Adulthood ==
=== Military service and higher education ===
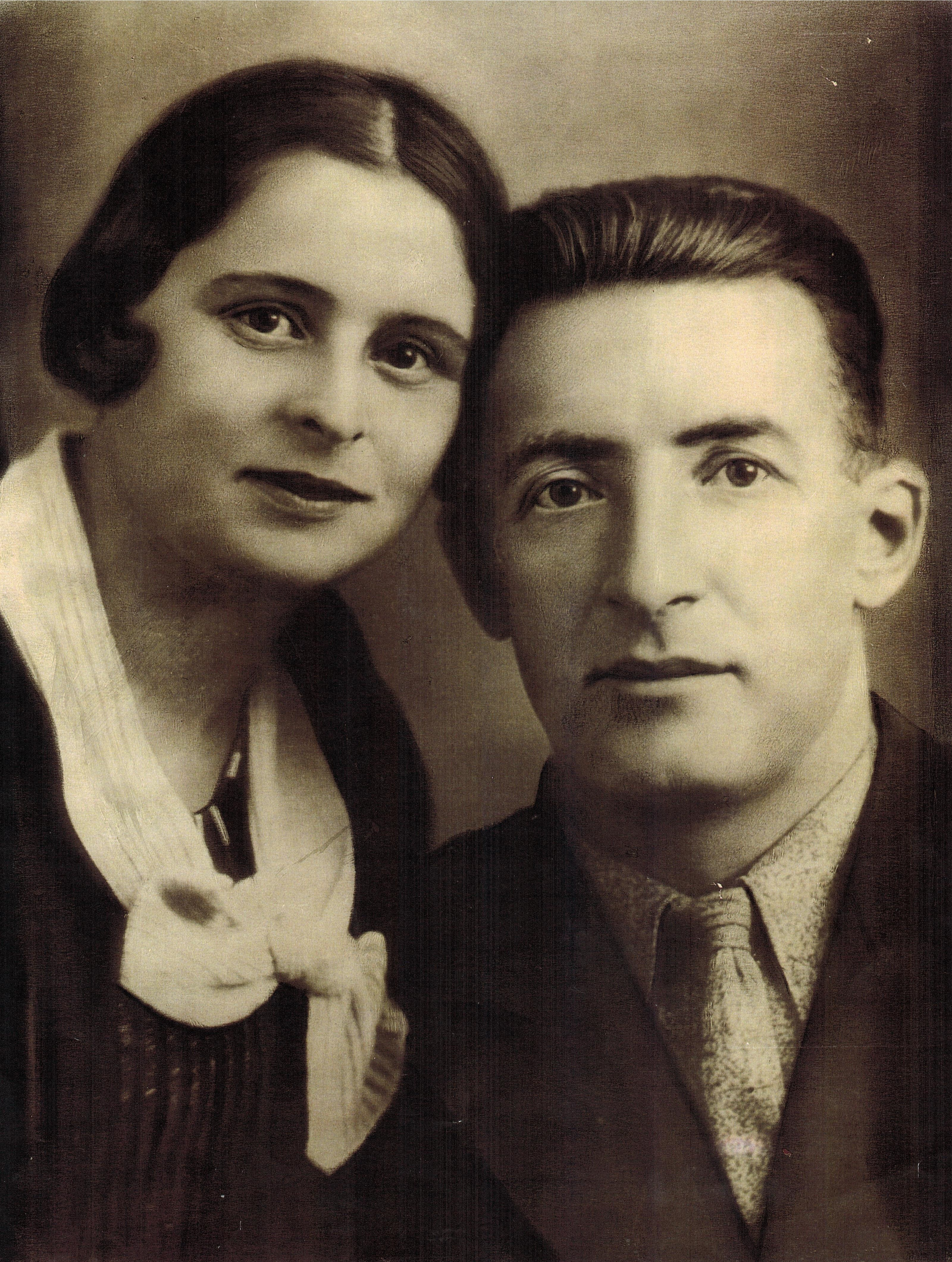
Zvi Preigerzon with wife (Lea)

After a short and unremarkable term of service in the Red Army in 1920, Zvi moved to Moscow and was accepted into the Moscow State Mining Academy (today known as the Moscow Institute of Steel and Alloys) and with the passage of years became one of the foremost mineral processing experts in the USSR. Zvi's efforts were further recognized by the university as in 1935 he was made a dean of the institute. However, his scientific achievements were not what made him a memorable figure in the Jewish culture – over the next fifteen years, Zvi's stories and poems continued being published in non-Soviet Jewish journals such as Ha Tkufa (התקופה), Ha Olam and Ha Doar.

During these uneasy years, Zvi met his wife Lea (then residing in Krolevets), they were wed in 1925 and returned to Moscow. The couple had three children: Athaliah (Asya) Preigerzon (1928–2015), an accomplished physician in later life; Nina Priegerzon (1930–present day), a psychiatrist and published author; and Benjamin Preigerzon (1937–2012), who followed in his father's footsteps and became an engineer (educated in the same university as his father Zvi).

As an interesting side note – all three of Zvi's children and Zvi's wife Lea had immigrated to Israel in the 1970s.

=== The Yiddish era ===
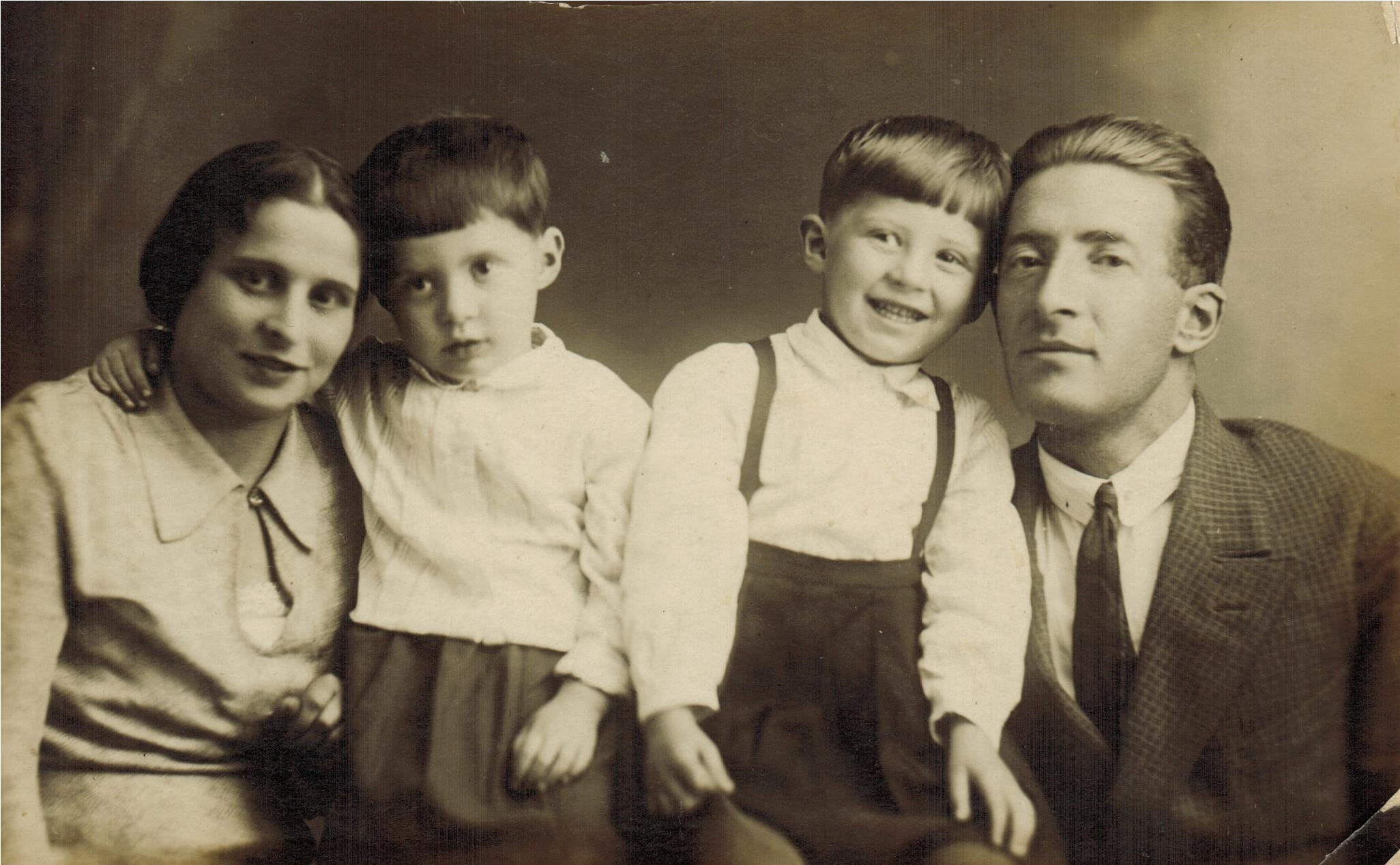
Zvi Preigerzon with wife (Lea) and daughters (Athaliah and Nina)

With the Hebrew language being, for all intents and purposes, banned by the USSR the Jewish culture necessarily adopted Yiddish as their alternative language. These changes affected Jewish authors as they had to not only switch their language of trade but also abide by Soviet literary regulations – per the increasingly harshly enforced rules of censorship in the Soviet Union. Namely, all Soviet authors had to lionize the government and the activity of the Communist Party and to express admiration for all state heroes.

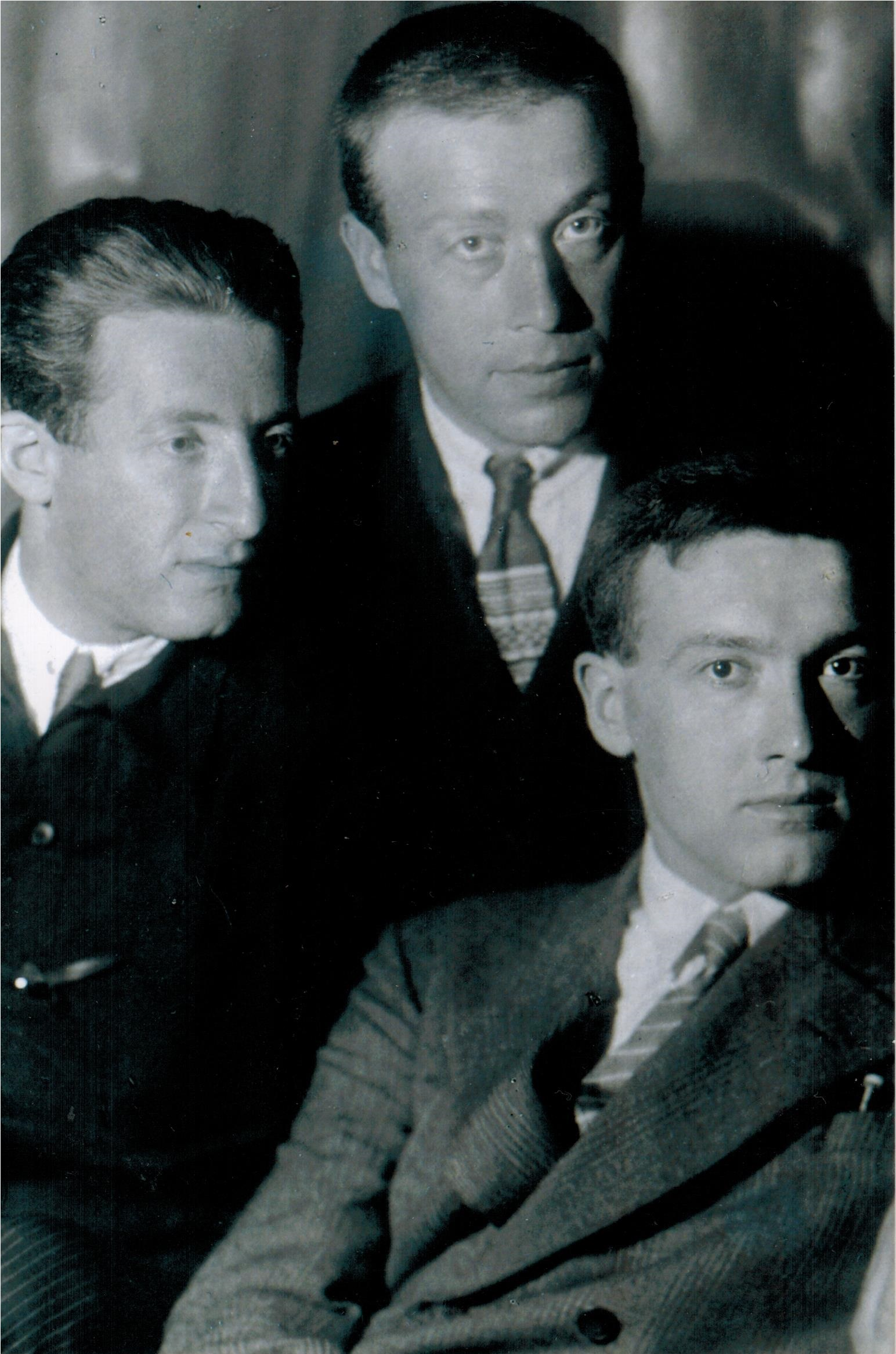
Zvi Preigerzon and brothers (Left to Right – Zvi, Osher and Shaia)

Zvi ignored these mandates and continued writing in Hebrew, giving his characters simple Jewish names and complicated Jewish problems. The author did so as his works were secret and were not meant for Soviet publication.

Most of Zvi's writing during this time were circled around the Character Benjamin the Fourth – as seen in the book When the Lamp Fade Away, this character was based on the author's self-image. The stories center around loving and soft-spoken persona – people trapped in the reality of revolution, war and the destruction of their religious and cultural traditions.

With the beginning of the Great Purge contact with international entities, let alone other countries, was becoming extremely dangerous. Zvi was forced to stop mailing his stories and poems overseas yet continued writing in secret.

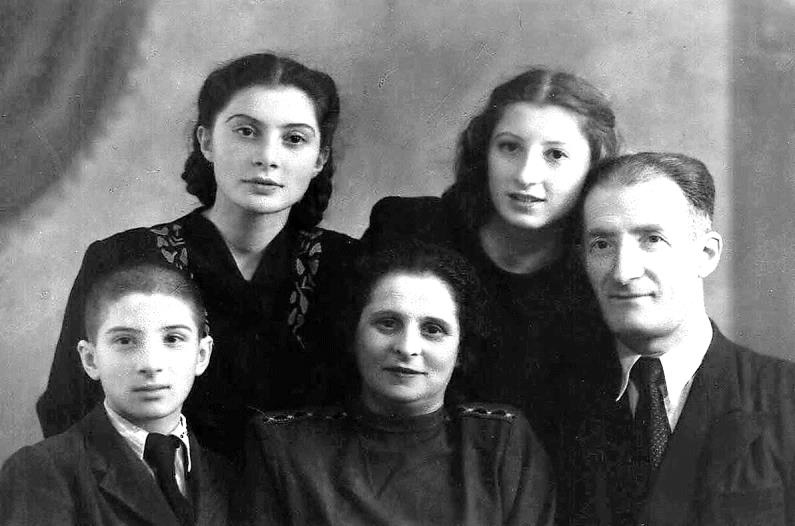
Zvi Preigerzon with wife (Lea) and daughters (Athaliah and Nina) and son (Benjamin)

=== World War II ===
Shortly after the initiation of the war, because of his profession Zvi was recalled from the People's Militia and sent by the Ministry of Natural Resources to Karaganda as the location became the prime provider of coal after the conquest of Donbas by the Third Reich.

The Holocaust and overall suffering of the Jewish people had a tremendous influence on Zvi and inspired the book When the Lamp Fades Away (The Perpetual Fire) – in which, once the Jews are exterminated or driven out of City of Hadiach a memorial lamp that has been alight for over a century goes dark. The closing sentiments of the book are Zionist wishes for a land where the Jews would be safe of such suffering. Zvi wrote this work in Hebrew and complete secrecy, so much so as to hide the efforts from his own family. Never satisfied with the work the author rewrote it numerous times, only finishing it in 1962. The book was later published in Israel in 1966 under the pen name A. Tsfoni.

== Older years ==
=== Post-war years ===
Between 1945 and 1948 Zvi continued to write stories with the main messages of the Jewish Holocaust and World War II. This activity was ever risky, and the Stalin regime withheld as much information on Jewish war suffering due to increasing antisemitism in the Soviet Union. This area of writings contains a greater amount of spirituality which was not present in the author prior to the war. An example of this is found in the story "Shaddai" (1945), where a talisman with that word is a key device in the plot. Other characters in stories of this time return to the faith of their forefathers when faced with war and terror.

=== Arrest ===
On March 1, 1949, Zvi Preigerzon was arrested as a result of the arrest of his friends, the Hebrew author Zvi Politikin, 1895–1968 (Pen Name: Moshe Heg) and Hebrew expert Meir Baazov.

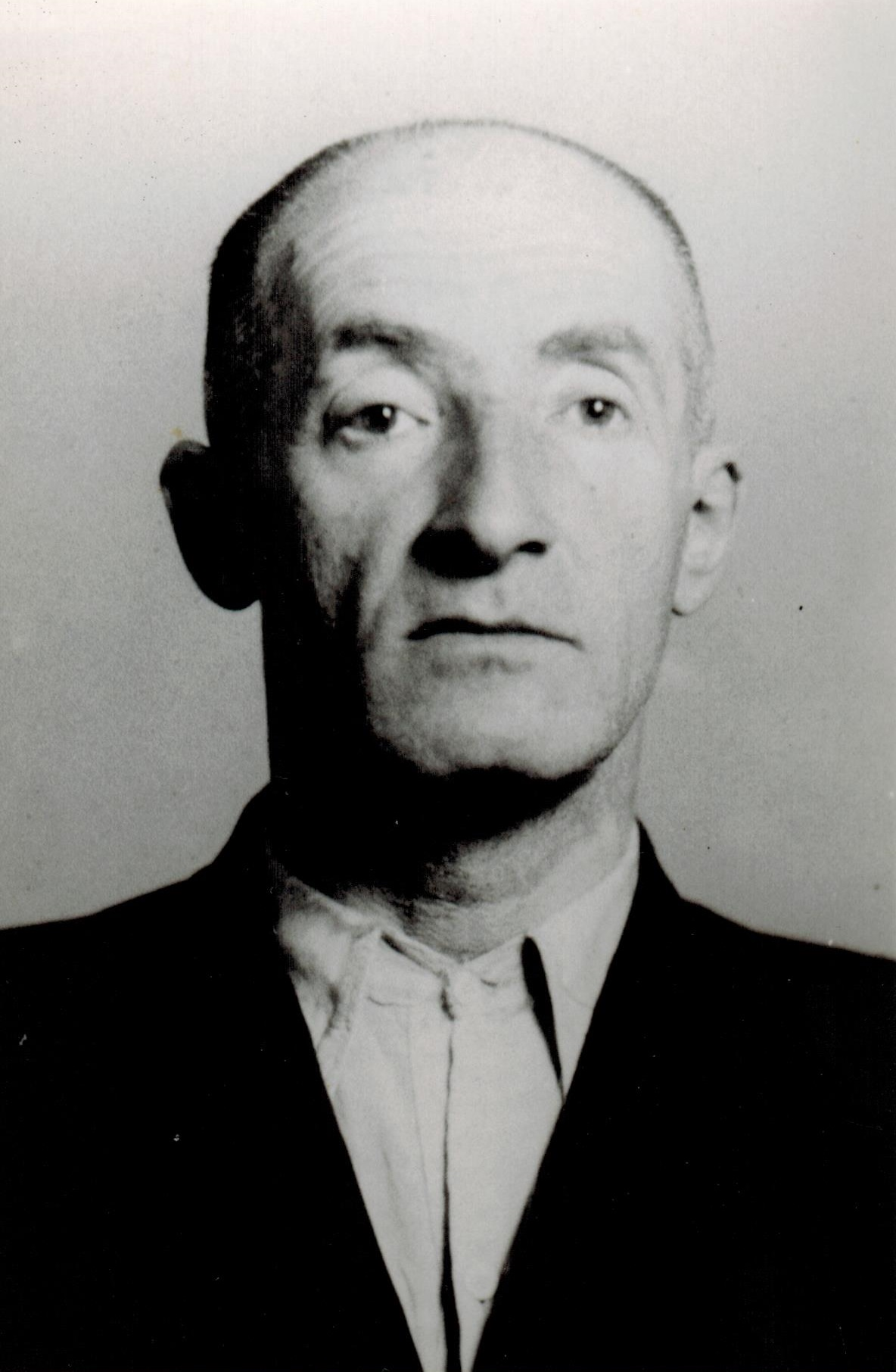
Zvi Preigerzon – arrest photo

The arrests were provoked by a friend by the name of Alex Gordon. Zvi was sentenced to 10 years as an anti-Soviet dissident and sent to Gulag labor camps. The author served his sentence in three different institutions in the Karaganda area: in Inta, Abez camp and Vorkuta. While imprisoned in Vorkuta, Zvi was given the ability to use his professional education and was made the head of a research unit focusing on mineral processing.

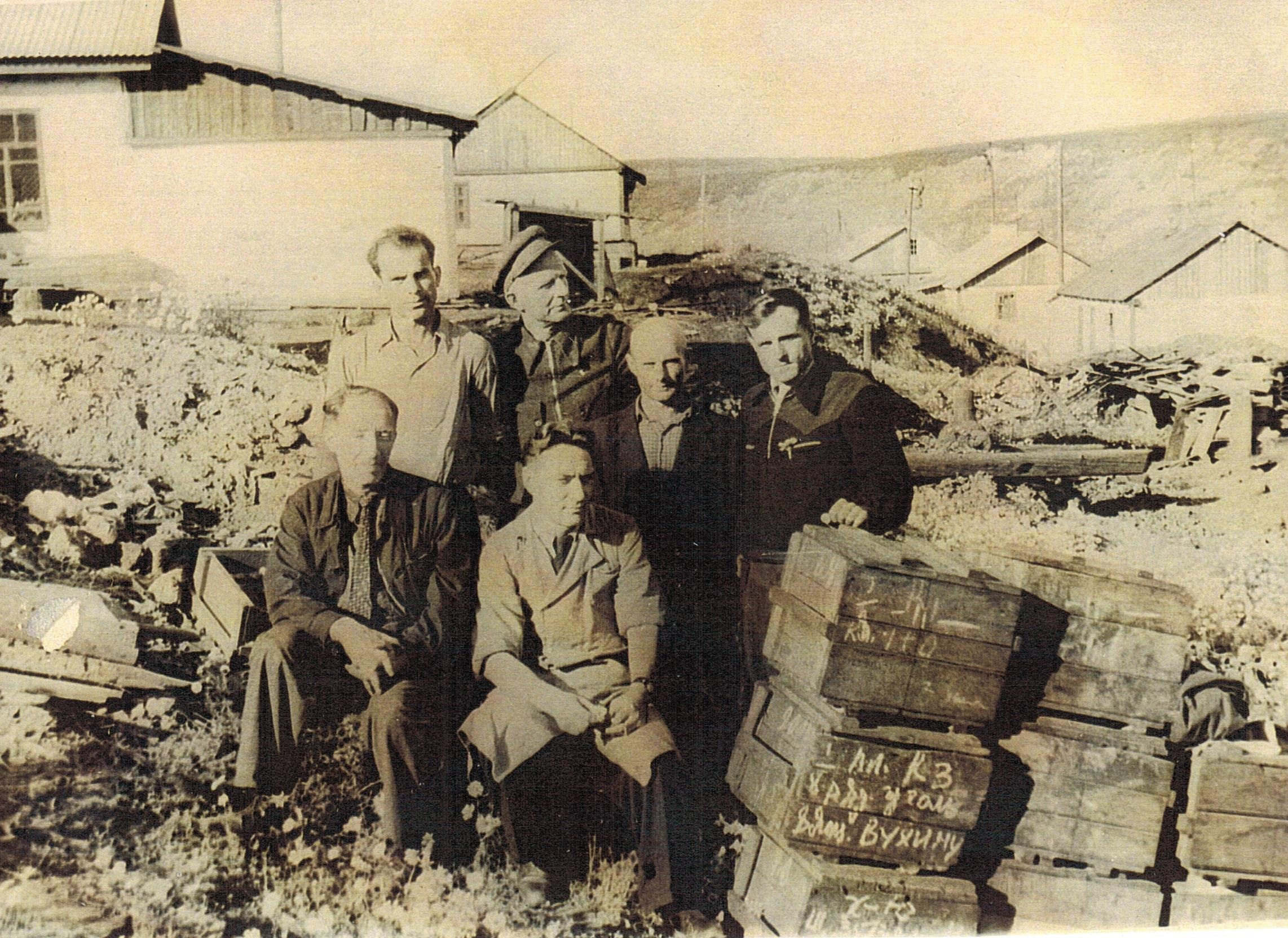
Zvi Preigerzon – Vorkuta Camp Research Team

Aside from the practical tasks assigned to Zvi and his team, the author conducted research and got a patent, while imprisoned, for the creation of an innovative coal collecting machine. Zvi was considered ideologically rehabilitated by December 1955 but voluntarily stayed in Vorkuta until 1957 to finish his scientific work.

While in camp, Zvi taught many young Jews Hebrew and Jewish literature. One such student was Meir Gelfond, a future doctor, who opened a Hebrew-language school in Moscow in the 1970s.

=== Post arrest ===
After his release from the camps, Zvi traveled to Moscow and started working on Memoirs of a Gulag Prisoner, finishing the volume in 1958. The book describes his experiences over the past decade and the many people he met and interacted with; among these the poets Samuel Halkin, Jacob Steinberg and Joseph Karler.

In Moscow Zvi was recognized for his scientific achievements and made a dean of the Moscow State Mining University, where he proceeded to teach and create educational materials in his field of expertise. The author spends his nights writing in Hebrew and has commented in the "Memoirs of a Gulag Prisoner" that he would face a second and third arrest but would not stop writing in his beloved language.

During the 1960s Zvi wrote two major stories (in translation) "Hebrew" (1960) and "Twenty Heroes" (1965). "Hebrew" is largely somewhat of autobiographical story with the main character being the language itself which prisoners use to communicate. "Twenty Heroes" is a return to faith type story in which pensioners reopen an old synagogue in post World War II Soviet territory despite the misgivings of the local authorities. These writings were expressions of the author's continued desire to return to the holy-land.

== Death ==
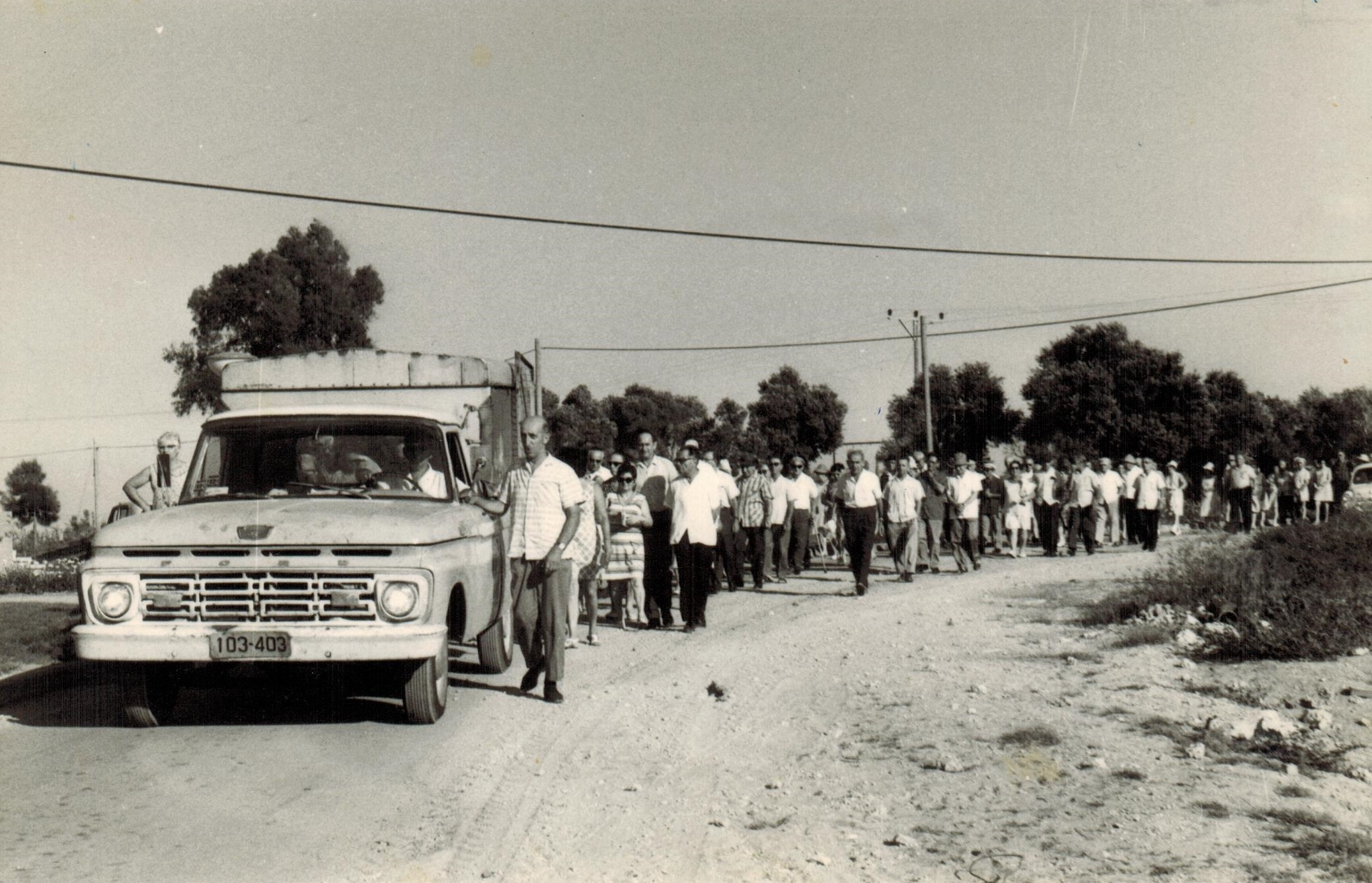
Zvi Preigerzon – Shefayim funeral Procession June 22, 1970

On March 15, 1969, Zvi Preigerzon died from a complicated heart attack in Moscow and was cremated. Rather befitting the complicated nature of the author's life, his journey would only end in 1970 in the very country of which he wrote and to which he wished to return.

Zvi's relatives worked for over a year to have his ashes sent to Israel (via postal mail as no other option was available) and a second burial took place on June 22, 1970, at the Shefayim Cemetery in Israel.

In 1986 Zvi's widow Lea had joined her husband in the Shfayim cemetery in Israel. Two of their children are now buried there as well: Benjamin (on August 23, 2012) and Athaliah (on October 29, 2015).

== Works ==
Most of Zvi's works are available in Russian on Google Books:

1. Burden of a Name

2. An Unfinished Story

3. Memories of a Gulag Prisoner

4. A book written by Nina Preigerzon (Zvi's daughter) about the author: My Father Zvi Preigerzon

== Audio / video materials ==
Several audio tapes have been digitized and published on YouTube and can be found here, because ecause of the limitations in the original recordings, the audio quality is unfortunately quite poor.
