= Sergey Khoruzhiy =

Russian physicist (1941–2020)

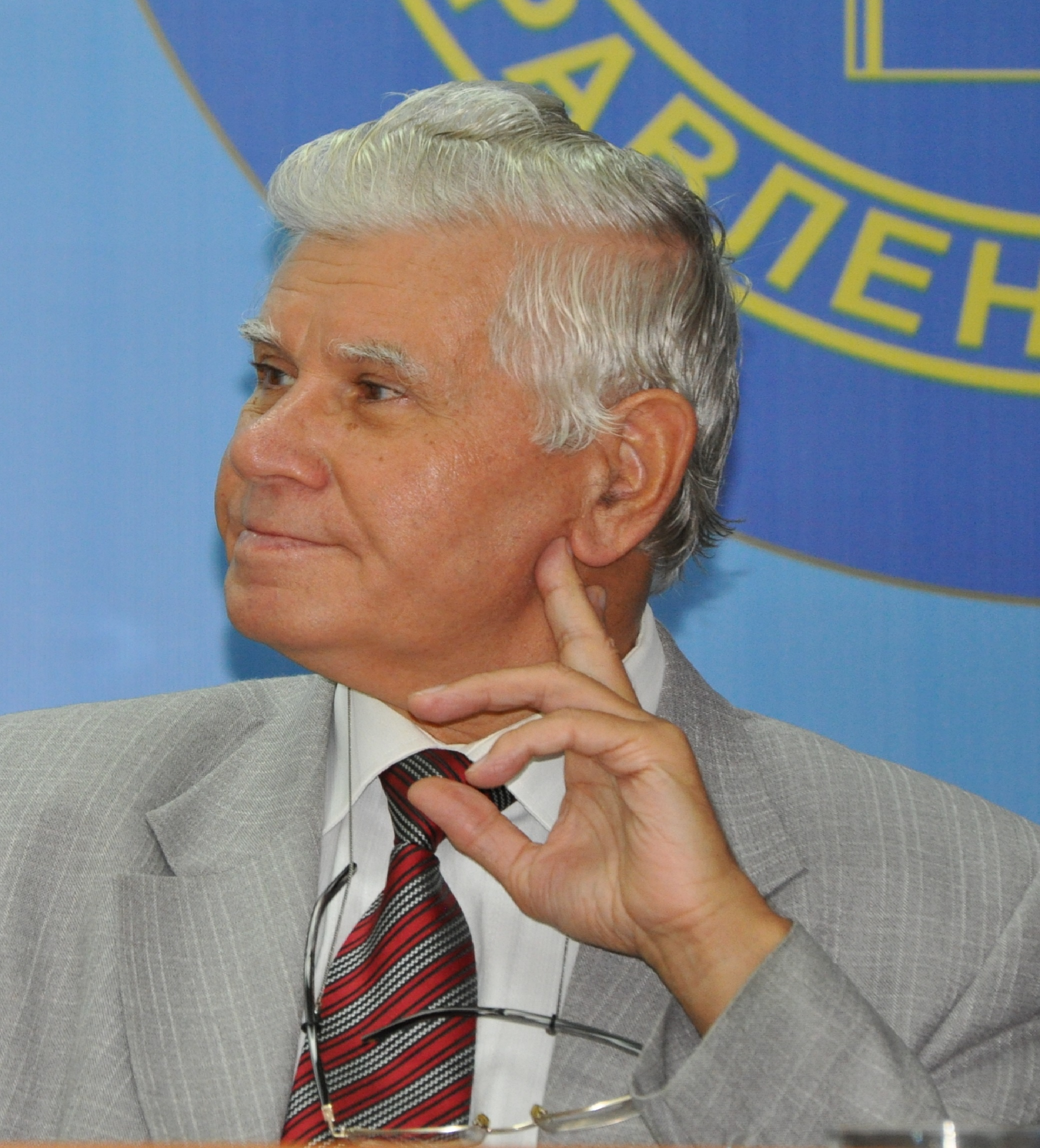
- Sergey Khrouzhiy
- Born: 5 October 1941; Skopin, Soviet Union
- Died: 22 September 2020 (aged 78)
- Occupation: Physicist

Sergey Khoruzhiy (5 October 1941 – 22 September 2020) was a prominent Russian physicist, mathematician, philosopher, and theologian. He is mostly known for his fundamental contributions to algebraic field theory, translation of Joyсe's Ulysses into Russian and creation of a new anthropological theory, called himself Synergic anthropology, which takes into account some of Heidegger's ideas, spiritual and postmodern philosophy.

== Biography ==
Khoruzhiy's father was an Arctic pilot who died while serving in World War II in 1941, the same year Khorouzhiy was born. His mother, Vera Kharuzhaya, was a leader in the Communist Party of the Soviet Union. She was one of the leaders in World War II in Vitebsk, but was captured and tortured by the Germans in 1942. Khoruzhiy was then brought up by his mother's family.

After finishing school in Moscow, Khoruzhiy entered the School of Physics at Moscow State University in 1958. In 1964, he began studying quantum physics under Nikolay Bogolyubov. He then graduated from the Steklov Institute of Mathematics after studying under the guidance of Mikhail Polivanov. He earned a doctoral degree in mathematical physics in 1976.

Khoruzhiy became a member of the Russian Academy of Natural Sciences in 1993 while serving as a professor at the Institute of Philosophy, Russian Academy of Sciences. He also served as a professor in the Department of Comparative Study of Religious Traditions at UNESCO, and directed the Institute of Synergistic Anthropology, beginning in 2005. Lastly, he served as a professor at the Moscow School of New Cinema, established in 2012.

In addition to his career in the scientific fields, Khoruzhiy published the works of philosophers Pavel Florensky, Sergei Bulgakov, Aleksei Losev, and Lev Karsavin. He also translated many works by the Irish author James Joyce, such as Ulysses and A Portrait of the Artist as a Young Man.
