= Platon Karsavin =

Russian dancer (1854–1922)

Platon Konstantinovich Karsavin (Russian: Платон Константинович Карсавин; 17 November 1854, Saint Petersburg – 1922, Saint Petersburg) was a dancer with the Russian Imperial Ballet in St Petersburg, and afterwards a teacher of dance.

== Biography ==
Platon Constantinovich Karsavin was born on 17 November 1854, at St Petersburg. His father had been a provincial actor, but had three children, and to feed his family, had become a tailor and moved to St. Petersburg. When Platon was 6 years old, his father died. The family was again left without money. Therefore, he and his brother Vladimir were placed in the Imperial Theatre School - where children lived and learned free, supported by the imperial treasury. A teacher of Platon Karsavin were Marius Petipa and Christian Johansson.

After Theatre School (in 1875) Platon Karsavin was admitted as a dancer at the Mariinsky Theatre. There he worked from 1875 to 1891. He danced in the ballets of Arthur Saint-Léon, Marius Petipa and Lev Ivanov.

After completing his career of ballet dancer, he became a teacher at the Imperial choreographic school. Among his pupils were Michel Fokine, Alexander Gorskiy, Adolph Bolm, Vasily Tikhomirov, Alexandr Monakhov, Alexandr Chekrygin, Alexandr Shiryayev (Cesare Pugni’grandson) etc.

He died in 1922 at St Petersburg.

== Family ==
- His wife, Anna Khomiakova, was the daughter of a cousin of the philosopher Aleksey Khomyakov.

Their children:

- Lev Platonovich Karsavin (1882–1952) was a religious philosopher, poet, and historian of European culture, a professor at St. Petersburg University, was expelled from Russia in 1922, taught at Vilnius University, Lithuania (1928–1939); was arrested by Joseph Stalin’s regime and died in 1952 in a prison camp.
- Tamara Karsavina (1885–1978) was a famous Russian ballerina.

== See also ==
- List of Russian ballet dancers
