= Der Nister =

Soviet writer & translator (1884–1950)

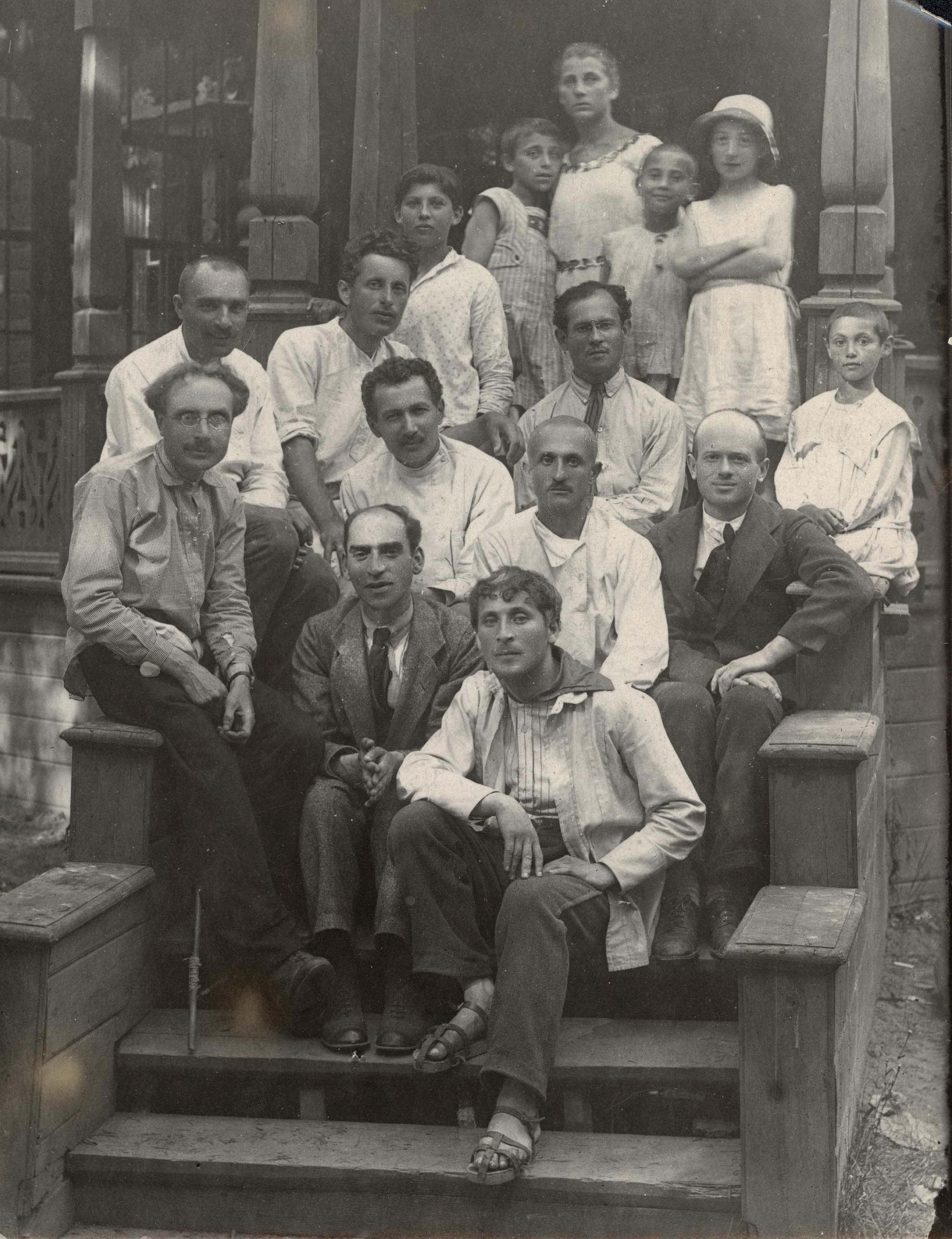
- Der Nister (front center) sitting behind Marc Chagall at the Malakhovka Jewish boys refuge
- Born: Pinchus Kahanovich; 1 November 1884 (NS); Berdychiv, Ukraine, Russian Empire
- Died: 4 June 1950; Abez camp, Soviet Union

Der Nister (Yiddish: דער נסתּר ֹor דער ניסטער, "the Hidden One"; 1 November 1884 – 4 June 1950 in the Abez camp of Gulag) was the pseudonym of Pinchus Kahanovich (Yiddish: פּנחס קאַהאַנאָוויטש), a Yiddish author, philosopher, translator, and critic.

== Early years ==
Kahanovich was born in Berdychiv, Ukraine, the third in a family of four children with ties to the Korshev sect of Hasidic Judaism. His father was Menakhem Mendl Kahanovich, a smoked-fish merchant at Astrakhan on the Volga River; his mother's name was Leah. He received a traditional religious education, but was drawn through his reading to secular and Enlightenment ideas, as well as to Zionism. In 1904 he left Berdychiv hoping to evade the military draft; this was probably when he started using the pseudonym. He moved to Zhytomyr, near Kiev, where he earned a modest living as a teacher of Hebrew at an orphanage for Jewish boys.

At that time he also wrote his first book, in Yiddish, Gedankn un motivn - lider in proze ("Ideas and Motifs - Prose Poems"), published in Vilna in 1907. He also made the acquaintance of the Yiddish writer I. L. Peretz, whom he greatly admired. Peretz recognised Der Nister's literary talents, and helped and encouraged him to publish his prose Hekher fun der Erd ("Higher than the Earth"), published in Warsaw in 1910.

In 1912, Kahanovich married Rokhel Zilberberg, a teacher. Their daughter, Hodel, was born in July 1913, shortly after the publication of his third book, Gezang un gebet ("Song and Prayer") in Kiev. At the outbreak of World War I, he found work in the timber industry, which gave him exemption from military service. He continued to write and produced in 1918/19 the first of his books for children, Mayselech in ferzn ("Erzählungen in Versen"; "Stories in Verse"). Also at this time he translated several of Andersen's fairy tales.

== Life ==
In 1920, he lived for a few months in a Jewish orphanage at Malakhovka, Moscow Oblast, where he worked as a teacher for Jewish orphans whose parents had been killed during the Tsarist pogroms from 1904 to 1906. Here he met other Jewish artists and intellectuals, among them David Hofstein, Leib Kvitko and Marc Chagall.

Probably in early 1921 Kahanovich left Malakhovka and moved with his family to Kovno (now Kaunas), Lithuania. There he had great difficulty earning a living and, like many other Russian intellectuals, moved to Berlin, Germany, where his son Joseph was born. From 1922 to 1924 he worked there as a freelancer for the Yiddish journal Milgroim ("Pomegranate") and also edited, along with David Bergelson, several Yiddish literary journals, though none lasted long. In Berlin, he also published a two-volume collection of his short stories under the title Gedakht ("Imagined"). The book was his first modest literary success. When Milgroim closed in 1924, he moved with his family to Hamburg, where he worked for two years for the Soviet Trade Mission.

In 1926, like many fellow exiles, he returned to the Soviet Union and settled in Kharkiv. In 1929, he published in Kiev Fun mayne giter ("From My Estates"). The work contains a complex web of metaphors drawing on Hasidic mysticism, especially the Kabbalah and the symbolic stories of Nachman of Breslov, creating a universe of images and parables, folk tales, children's poems and rhymes. His long sentences create a distinctive rhythm. They also reflect the increasing pressure exerted at the time by the Soviet regime on Jewish intellectuals. The symbol-laden work, rich in Jewish themes, was declared reactionary by the Soviet regime and its literary critics, and he became subject to increasingly stringent Soviet censorship. In 1929, he was criticized when the Russian Yiddish newspaper Di Royte Velt ("The Red World") reprinted his tale Unter a Ployt ("Bottom Fence"). The then president of the Russian Yiddish Writers Federation, Moyshe Litvakov, initiated a campaign against him, at the end of which Der Nister had to renounce literary symbolism.

He now tried to write within the constraints of the prevailing socialist realism, and began to write stories. These collected writings appeared in 1934 under the title Hoyptshtet ("Capital cities"). He stopped publishing original works and, in the early 1930s, worked almost exclusively as a journalist and translator, translating works by Tolstoy, Victor Hugo and Jack London. His own literary work was limited to four small collections of short stories for children.

Just before World War II, the Soviet government briefly adopted less censorious policies over writings considered to be promoting Zionism. Der Nister began working on his major work, Di Mishpokhe Mashber ("The Family Mashber"). The first volume appeared in 1939 in Moscow. The work was almost universally praised by critics, and he seemed to be rehabilitated. However, the success was short-lived. The limited edition of the first volume sold out quickly, but the Second World War and the German invasion of the Soviet Union in 1941 made publication of a second edition impossible. The second volume, dedicated to his daughter Hodel, who starved to death during the siege of Leningrad in early 1942, was not published until 1948 in New York. The manuscript of the third volume, the completion of which Der Nister mentioned in a letter, has been lost.

During World War II, Der Nister was evacuated to Tashkent, where he wrote stories about the persecution of Jews in German-occupied Poland, based on firsthand accounts from friends. These collected stories were published in 1943 under the title Korbones ("Victims") in Moscow, where he had moved with his second wife Lena Singalowska, a former actress of the Yiddish theater in Kiev. In April 1942, Stalin ordered the formation of the Jewish Anti-Fascist Committee (JAC) to influence international public opinion and organize political and material support for the Soviet fight against Nazi Germany, particularly from the West. Solomon Mikhoels, the actor and director of the Moscow State Jewish Theatre, was appointed chairman of the JAC. Other members were Der Nister, Itzik Feffer, Peretz Markish and Samuel Halkin. They wrote texts and petitions appealing for help against the Nazi pogroms, some of which were printed in U.S. newspapers. The JAC also raised funds.

In 1947, Der Nister made a trip to Birobidzhan, the USSR Jewish Autonomous Region near the Chinese border. He traveled there on a special migrant train, together with a thousand Holocaust survivors, to evaluate the development of the self-governing Jewish settlement in this area. Soon afterwards, however, Stalin's policy shifted towards the elimination of Jewish writers and the destruction of Jewish culture in the Soviet Union. In February 1949, Der Nister was among the last Jewish writers to be arrested. The Soviet authorities officially reported that Der Nister died on 4 June 1950 in an unknown Soviet prison hospital. Many of Der Nister's contemporaries were killed in August 1952 in the Night of the Murdered Poets, including Itzik Feffer, Peretz Markish, David Hofstein, Leib Kvitko and David Bergelson.

Der Nister's last writings, describing the persecution and destruction of the Jewish communities in Europe under the Nazi regime, and hinting at Soviet persecution as well, were collected in a work, Vidervuks ("Regrowth"), published posthumously in 1969.

Israel Joshua Singer, another Yiddish novelist, once said of Der Nister that "had writers of the whole world been given a chance to read [his] work, they would have broken their pens.”

== Burial site ==
For more than a half-century after his death in captivity, Der Nister's place of death was not known to the public. In August 2017, researchers from Israel and Russia located his remains at a prisoner cemetery of Abez camp of Gulag in the village of Abez, near Vorkuta, where he was recorded to have died on June 4, 1950. The researchers set up an improvised memorial atop his unmarked grave consisting of a Star of David fashioned from barbed wire.

== Works ==
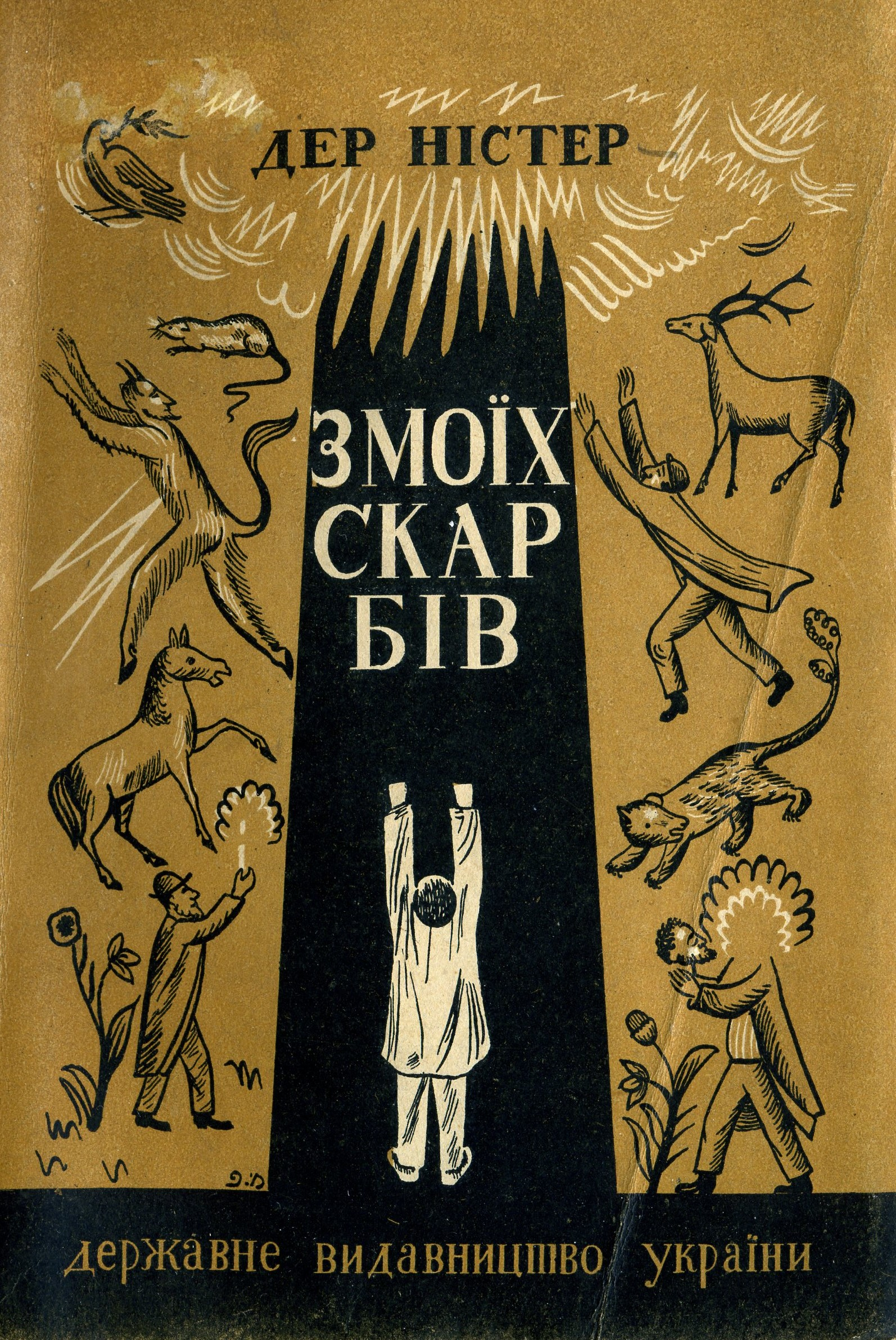
The cover of Der Nister's book Fun maine giter in Ukrainian, published in 1930

Even in his earliest works, he was drawn to the arcane teachings of the Kabbalah and to the intense use of symbols in his writings.

His best-known work, Di mishpokhe Mashber ("The Family Mashber"), is a naturalistic family saga. The work is a realistically written description of Jewish life in his native city Berdychiv at the end of the 19th century, with the three brothers as main actors: Moshe is a proud business man; Luzi is a skeptic mystic and benefactor who believes with brave defiance in the eternity of the Jewish people, probably a self-representation of Kahanovich; and Alter is a philanthropic altruist. David Roskies calls the depiction of the protagonist, Moshe, "the most finely wrought portrait of a hasidic merchant in all of Yiddish literature." As in the novel, whose protagonist's brother joins the Breslover Hasidim, Pinchas's brother Aaron did the same. Der Nister himself was influenced by Rebbe Nachman's Hasidic parables, though this manifests in his fiction, Roskies argues, through a filter of Russian modernism, and authors like Andrei Bely also influenced his work.

Di mishpokhe Mashber ("The Family Mashber") was translated into Hebrew in 1962, into French in 1984, into English by Leonard Wolf in 1987, into German in 1990, and into Dutch in 2002 by Willy Brill.

Der Nister appears as one of the main characters in the novel The World to Come (2006) by Dara Horn. The book describes Kahanovich's uneasy friendship with artist Marc Chagall, inside whose frames he hid some of his writings. Adaptations, descriptions, and excerpts from his stories, and those of other Yiddish writers, are included. Horn makes one fictional change: in the novel, Der Nister dies almost immediately after his arrest, whereas in reality he died the following year, or as late as 1952 according to some sources.

== Selected works ==
- Gedankn un motivn — lider in proze ("Ideas and Motifs — Prose Poems"), Vilna, 1907
- Hekher fun der erd ("Higher than the Earth"), Warsaw, 1910
- Gezang un gebet ("Song and Prayer"), Kiev, 1912 (collection of songs)
- Translation of selected tales from Hans Christian Andersen, 1918
- Mayselekh in ferzn ("Stories in Verse"), 1918/19 (many editions: Kiev, Warsaw, Berlin)
- Gedakht ("Imagined"), Berlin, 1922/23 (collection of fantastic stories, 2 vols.)
- Fun mayne giter ("From My Estates"), Kiev, 1929
- Hoyptshtet ("Capital Cities"), Moscow, 1934
- Zeks mayselekh ("Six Little Tales"), 1939
- Di mishpokhe Mashber ("The Family Mashber"), Kiev, 1939 (Vol. 1), New York, 1948 (Vol. 2)
- Korbones ("Victims"), Moscow, 1943
- Dertseylungen un eseyen ("Stories and Essays"), New York, 1957 (posthumous)
- Vidervuks ("Regeneration"), Moscow, 1969 (posthumous)

== See also ==
- Yiddish literature
- Antisemitism in the Soviet Union
- Rootless cosmopolitanism, Soviet canard used during antisemitic purges of Jewish writers 1948-1953
