= McParland =

McParland may refer to:

== Sports ==
- Anthony McParland (born 1982), Scottish football player
- Archie McParland (born 2005), English rugby union player
- Davie McParland (1935–2018), Scottish football player and manager
- Ian McParland (born 1961), Scottish football player and manager
- Jenna McParland (born 1992), Canadian ice hockey player
- Peter McParland (1934–2025), Northern Irish football player

== Other ==
- Edward McParland (born 1943), Irish architectural historian
- James McParland (1843–1919), American private detective and Pinkerton agent
- Leland McParland (1896–1989), American politician
