= Hryhoriy Lakota =

Ukrainian Greek Catholic auxiliary bishop

Blessed Hryhorij Lakota
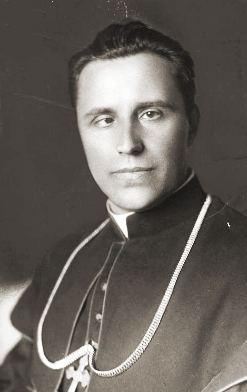
- Born: 31 January 1883; Holodivka, Kingdom of Galicia and Lodomeria, Austria-Hungary
- Died: 12 November 1950 (aged 67); Abezlag, near Vorkuta
- Venerated in: Ukrainian Greek Catholic Church
- Beatified: 27 June 2001, Ukraine by Pope John Paul II

Hryhoriy Lakota, also known as Gregor Lakota (Ukrainian: Григорій Лакота, Polish: Grzegorz Łakota; 31 January 1883 – 12 November 1950), was a Ukrainian Greek Catholic auxiliary bishop who suffered religious persecution and was martyred by the Soviet Union. He was beatified by Pope John Paul II on 27 June 2001 in Ukraine.

== Biography ==
Hryhorij Lakota was born 31 January 1883 in Holodivka, then in Austrian Galicia, near modern-day Lviv.

He studied theology in Lviv and was ordained to the priesthood in 1908. In 1911, he later received his PhD in theology in Vienna. He was appointed auxiliary bishop of Przemyśl on 16 May 1926.

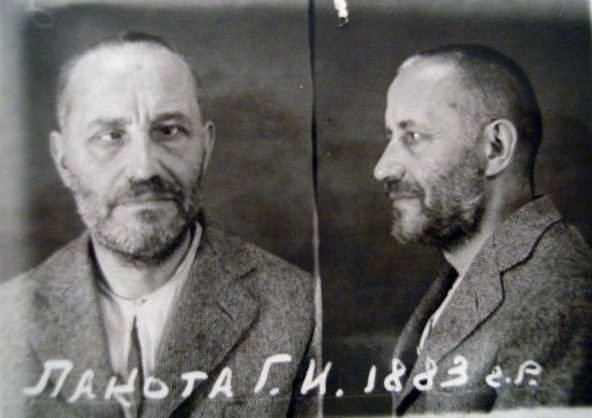
Hryhorij Lakota after arrest by NKVD 1946

On 9 June 1946, he was arrested by the NKVD and sentenced to ten years imprisonment, as part of Joseph Stalin's suppression of the Ukrainian Greek Catholic Church. While in exile in Vorkuta m, he was recognized for his humaneness and humility as he took on unbearable conditions to make life easier for others. Alfonsas Svarinskas, a fellow priest and prisoner, recounts Lakota's behavior in camp as reflecting "Christian virtues."

Lakota died at the Abez camp, near Vorkuta on 12 November 1950.

== In popular media ==
Lakota and another Ukrainian Catholic Bishop, Josyf Slipyj, became the inspiration for the character of Kiril Pavlovich Lakota in the novel The Shoes of the Fisherman, which was later made into a film.
