= Ivan Grevs =

Russian historian and medievalist (1860-1941)

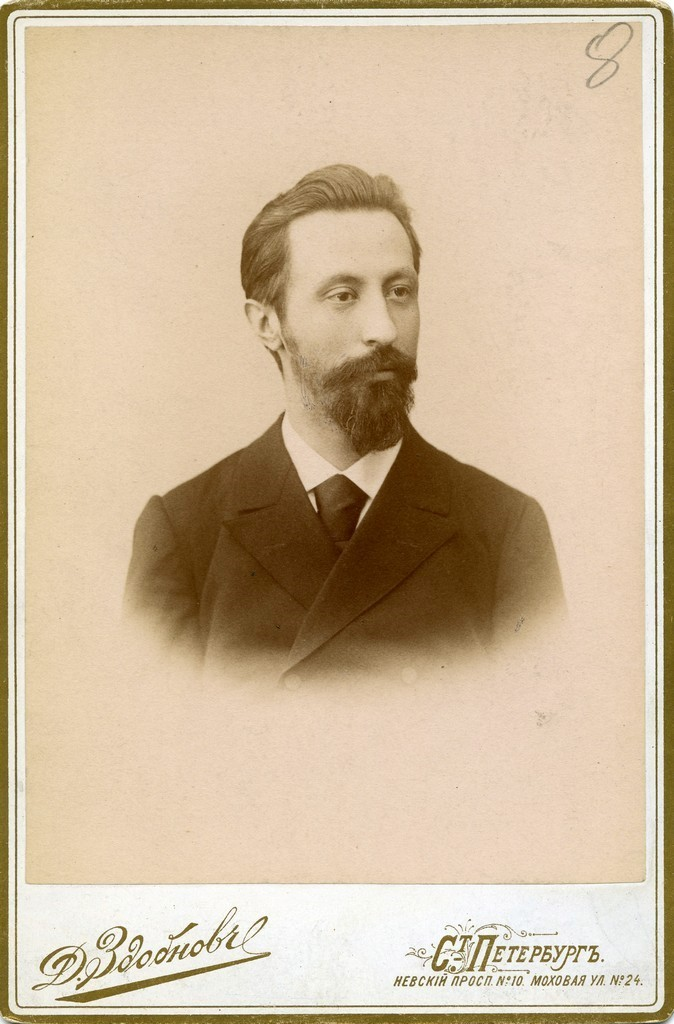
Ivan Mikhaĭlovich Grevs

Ivan Mikhailovich Grevs (Russian: Ива́н Миха́йлович Гревс; 4 May 1860 – 16 May 1941) was a Russian historian and one of the founders of the Russian school of medievalism that emphasised the influence of the Roman Empire on the social structure of medieval Europe. He was an advocate of the education of women. Doctor of Sciences in Historical Sciences.

He was born into a landholding family who originally came from England during the time of Peter the Great. The surname had been Greaves. He was born on his father's estate near Lutovinov, Biryusinsky district, Voronezh.

In 1873, he moved to Saint Petersburg, where he died in 1941. He is buried at Volkovskoe Lutheran Cemetery.

== Selected publications ==
- Essays on the History of Roman Landholding (1899)
- Essays on Florentine Culture (1903)
- Tacitus (1946)
