= Henry Parland =

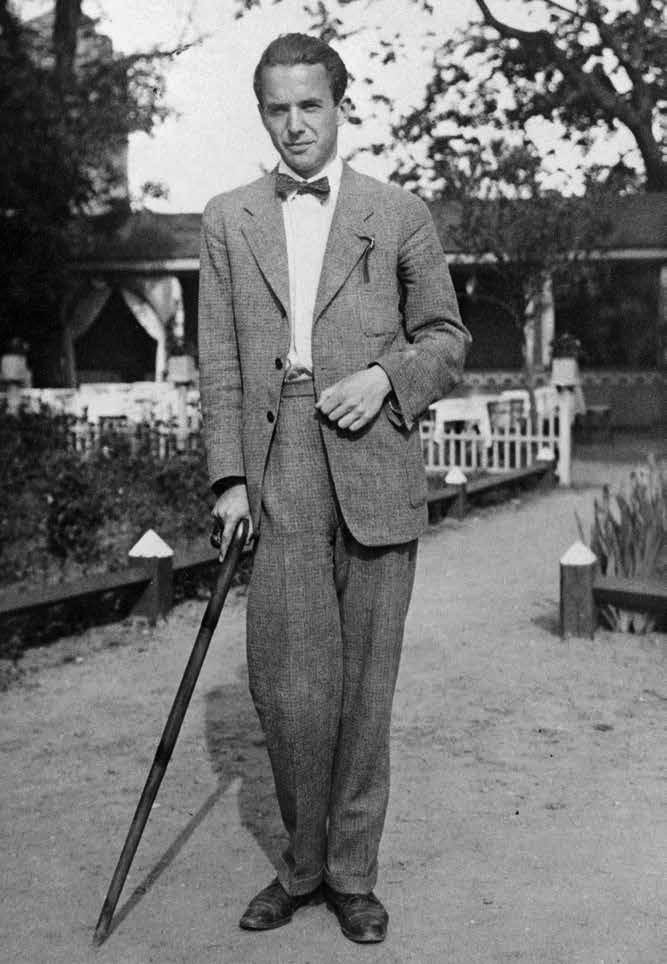
- Born: 29 July 1908; Vyborg, Grand Duchy of Finland
- Died: 10 November 1930 (aged 22); Kaunas, Lithuania
- Occupations: Poet, novelist and journalist

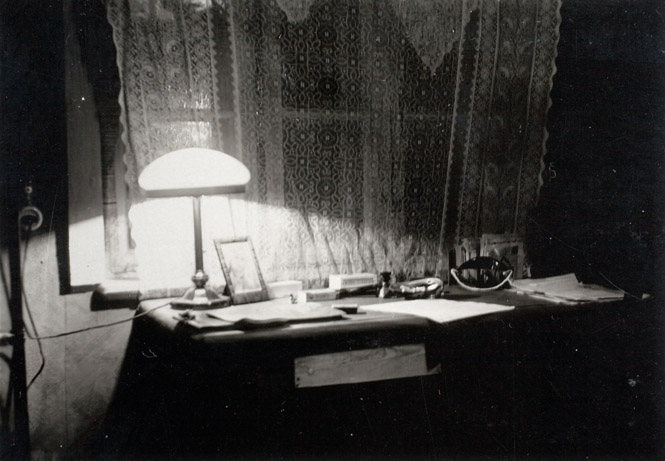
Henry Parland's desk, picture from SLS archives- SLSA945.

Henry George William Parland (29 July 1908 – 10 November 1930) was a Swedish-speaking Finnish poet, novelist and culture journalist in the Finn-Swedish and Lithuanian press.

== Biography ==
The Parland family, originally McFarlaine, is thought to have originated in Scotland. Henry Parland's father, Oswald Frank Parland, was an engineer on the Russian Railways and, through the expansion of the railway network, came to travel around in his job in Tsarist Russia at the time. The family settled in Tikkala, Finland. Parland's mother was Ida Maria Sesemann. Henry Parland was the eldest of four brothers, three of whom became writers. The others were Oscar Parland and Ralf Parland.

Parland grew up in a multilingual environment. German and Russian were spoken at home, and French and English were also spoken through contacts with the cultural and business world. Parland learned Finnish from working-class children in Tikkala and Swedish only after the family moved to Kauniainen.

Parland attended a Swedish school in Grankulla, near Helsinki, at the age of fourteen. He graduated from Grankulla Samskolan in 1927. He then studied law at the University of Helsinki from 1927 to 1929. He showed an early interest in art and writing and became part of a circle centered around the poet Gunnar Björling. Parland also moved in with Björling and apparently lived a dissolute artistic life. After becoming financially insolvent by signing bills of exchange, Parland was sent to his maternal uncle, Vasilij Sesemann, in Kaunas, the Lithuanian capital at the time. From 1929, Parland had a secretarial position at the Swedish consulate in Kaunas. During his time in Lithuania, he also worked for Lithuanian newspapers. He fell ill with scarlet fever the following year and died at the age of 22.

Before his death, Parland only published one of his works, Idealrealisation, which was published in 1929. During the same year, the work received reviews from, among others, Elmer Diktonius in Arbetarbladet, Olof Enckell in Hufvudstadsbladet, Agnes Langenskjöld in Finsk Tidskrift and Erik Therman in Studentbladet.

== Language and scripts ==
Swedish is sometimes described as Parland's fourth language, after German, Russian and Finnish. His style and choice of words appear to be peculiar and the texts contain some completely unique words. During his years in Helsinki, Parland mainly wrote poetry. His friend Gunnar Björling helped him with stylistics and spelling.

Parland's most significant work is the novel Sönder (about the development of Velox paper). Parland began Sönder in November 1929 in Kaunas. The work was only published after the author's death, first in 1932 in the collection Återsken. Since then, three partly different editions have been published, most recently an edition annotated by Per Stam which was published twice, in 2005 and 2014.

In 2015, the Society of Swedish Literature in Finland began work on publishing a text-critical edition of all of Parland's writings, with Per Stam as editor-in-chief. Five parts are planned: Poems, Prose, Criticism and Correspondence, as well as a digital new edition of the novel Sönder. Parland's archive is held by the Society of Swedish Literature in Finland.

== Reception ==
Ghita Barck was one of the first to draw attention to Parland with her master's thesis on Parland's writing. Despite this, greater interest in Parland was not aroused until 1964 when his brother, Oscar Parland, published his collected poems and his prose productions.

Henry Parland is considered one of the foremost figures in modernism. His writing was far ahead of its time and is still alive and relevant today. In the 1970s, a new stage in Parland's posthumous fame occurred when Finnish semiotic circles drew attention to Parland's contacts with the Russian formalists and highlighted him as a pioneer of Finnish semiotics. His work Den modernistiska dikten ur formalistisk synpunkt is considered the first work to introduce semiotics in Finland.

Author Gunnar Björling wrote: "Henry Parland brought a new generation of irreverence and hilarious irony, and during his short life, he gave impulses and unforgettable companionship. A candle lit in life's stupor!"

Parland's works received several reviews after they were published. For example, the collection volume Återsken (1932) was noted by reviewers such as Elmer Diktonius in Arbetarbladet and Olof Enckell in Hufvudstadsbladet, both of whom had reviewed his earlier works, as well as Hagar Olsson in Svenska Pressen and Xerex in Tammerfors Aftonblad. Another of Parland's collections, Hamlet sade det vackrare (1964), was reviewed by, among others, Arto Kytöhonka in Keskisuomalainen, Pekka Piirto in Helsingin Sanomat and Helmer J. Wahlroos in Borgåbladet.

At the Gothenburg Book Fair in 2005, a seminar was arranged around Parland's writing. Stella Parland, author, literary critic and relative of Henry Parland, participated.

== Bibliography ==
- Idealrealisation. Helsinki: Söderström. 1929. SELIBR 435021. – Fulltext: Projekt Runeberg.
- Återsken. Helsinki: Söderström. 1932. SELIBR 1310386. – Fulltext: Göteborgs universitetsbibliotek and Projekt Runeberg.
- Hamlet sade det vackrare : samlade dikter. FIB :s lyrikklubbs bibliotek, 0425-5232 ; 95 [i.e. 96]. Stockholm: Folket i bild. 1964. SELIBR 434925. - Edited by Oscar Parland.
- Den stora dagenefter. Stockholm: Wahlström & Widstrand. 1966. SELIBR 1762748. – Edited by Oscar Parland.
- Säginteannat. Stockholm: Wahlström & Widstrand. 1970. SELIBR 435035. – Edited by Oscar Parland.
- Sönder. (om framkallning av veloxpapper). Pilotserien, 99-0716698-7. Stockholm: Self-publishing. 1987. ISBN 91-7054-544-8. SELIBR 7596329.
- Sönder. (Om framkallning av Veloxpapper). Writings published by the Society of Swedish Literature in Finland 677, 0039-6842. Stockholm & Helsinki: Published and annotated by Per Stam. 2005. ISBN 91-7353-084-0. SELIBR 9876622.
- Sönder. (Om framkallning av Veloxpapper). Stockholm & Helsinki: Published and annotated by Per Stam. 2014. ISBN 9789515832771. SELIBR 14744691.
- Sönder (om framkallning av Veloxpapper). Writings published by the Society of Swedish Literature in Finland 677, 2 upplagan. Stockholm & Helsinki: Published and annotated by Per Stam. (digital reissue by Stam 2005)
- Mina lögner: Henry Parland i urval, published by Pieter Claes & Elisa Veit with foreword by Agneta Rahikainen, SLS Varia 10, Helsinki: Society of Swedish Literature in Finland, Stockholm: Appell förlag 2022. ISBN 978-951-583-564-2 (Finland), ISBN 978-91-986643-3-1 (Sweden)
- Poems and essays by Henry Parland in Agneta Rahikainen, ed. (2009). Jag är ju utlänning vart jag än kommer. En bok om Henry Parland. SSLS 724. Helsinki & Finland: Society of Swedish Literature in Finland & Atlantis. ISBN 9789515831811. SELIBR 11447266.

=== Henry Parland's writing ===
The work of publishing a new scholarly and annotated edition of Henry Parland's Writings was begun by the Society of Swedish Literature in Finland in 2015 and was completed in 2020. The editions are published both in book form and in digital form.

- 2018 – Dikter. Writings published by the Society of Swedish Literature in Finland 825:1. Stockholm & Helsinki: Issued by Per Stam. ISBN 978-951-583-360-0
- 2019 – Prosa. Writings published by the Society of Swedish Literature in Finland 825:2. Stockholm & Helsinki: Issued by Elisa Veit. ISBN 978-951-583-436-2
- 2019 – Kritik. Writings published by the Society of Swedish Literature in Finland 825:3. Stockholm & Helsinki: Issued by Per Stam. ISBN 978-951-583-474-4
- 2020 – Korrespondens. Writings published by the Society of Swedish Literature in Finland 825:4. Stockholm & Helsinki: Issued by Elisa Veit.
- 2020 – Brev. Writings published by the Society of Swedish Literature in Finland 825:4. Stockholm & Helsinki: Issued by Elisa Veit. ISBN 978-951-583-475-1
