= Oscar Parland =

Finnish Swede author and psychiatrist

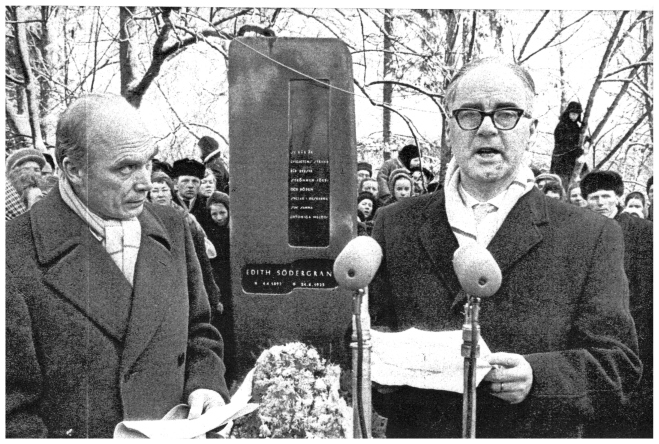
- Parland to the right speaking at the unveiling of the memorial for Edith Södergran in 1960.
- Born: April 20, 1912; Kyiv, Russian Empire
- Died: September 27, 1997 (aged 85); Helsinki, Finland
- Education: Helsinki University
- Occupations: Author, translator, psychiatrist

Oscar Percival Parland (April 20, 1912 – September 27, 1997) was a Finland-Swedish author, translator and psychiatrist. Parland is known for the praised trilogy Den förtrollade vägen, Tjurens år and Spegelgossen.

== Life and work ==
Oscar Parland's parents were the engineer Oswald Frank Parland and Ida Maria, née Sesemann. The family lived in Russia until the end of 1919 when they due to the revolution moved to Finland, first to Kilo in Espoo and after a couple of years to Grankulla. Russian and German were the family's home languages, and it was only at the age of ten that Oscar Parland learned the language that would become his author's language, namely Swedish. The brothers Henry Parland and Ralf Parland also became writers who wrote in Swedish. The brotherhood also included Herman Parland.

Parland graduated from gymnasium in 1930 and received his medical degree in 1944. He specialized in nerve and mental illnesses and worked in the 1940s at Pitkäniemi and Lappviken Hospital. In 1947 he was employed at Nickby in Sibbo where he worked for almost thirty years, first as a doctor and then as chief physician 1960–1975. In his professional life as a psychiatrist, he used art therapy as a method.

Parland's made his literature debut in 1945, but had his breakthrough in 1953 with Den förtrollade vägen (in English The Enchanted Road). The novel, like the rest of the trilogy, is partly autobiographical and depicts social life on the Karelia Isthmus. The book became a central work in modern Finland Swedish literature and Finnish literature and received brilliant reviews. The sequel Tjurens år (in English The Year of the Bull) was published in 1962 and the third part Spegelgossen posthumously in 2001. The first two parts of the trilogy were filmed under the direction of Åke Lindman in 1986 and 1988, respectively.

== Awards ==
- 1953, Svenska Dagbladet Literature Prize
- 1946, 1954 and 1963, State prize for literature (Finnish: Kirjallisuuden valtionpalkinto)
- 1946, 1954 and 1963, Prize from the Society of Swedish Literature in Finland
- 1968, Stiftelsen Längmanska kulturfonden's Finland Prize for Swedish-speaking Finnish authors
