= List of titles in Seminar Studies in History =

This is an incomplete list of titles in the book series, Seminar Studies in History, by original date of publication.

== 1960s & 70s ==
- Patrick Richardson. Empire and Slavery, (1968). ISBN 0582313880
- Anthony Fletcher. Tudor Rebellions, (1968). (2nd ed. 1973, 3rd ed. 1983); revised with Diarmaid MacCulloch (4th ed. 1997, 5th ed. 2004, 6th ed. 2015, 7th ed. 2020) ISBN 0367345528
- Howard Shaw. The Levellers, (1968). ISBN 0582313872
- Roger Lockyer. Henry VII, (1968). (2nd ed. 1983); revised with Andrew Thrush (3rd ed. 1997) ISBN 0582209129
- E. C. Midwinter. Victorian Social Reform, (1968). ISBN 0582313856
- Robin Briggs. The Scientific Revolution of the Seventeenth Century, (1969). ISBN 0582313937
- Geoffrey Taylor. The Problem of Poverty, 1660-1834, (1969). ISBN 0582313929
- Paul Adelman. Gladstone, Disraeli and Later Victorian Politics, (1970). (2nd ed. 1983, 3rd ed. 1997) ISBN 0582293227
- D. G. Wright. Democracy and Reform, 1815-1885, (1970). ISBN 0582314003
- John White & Ralph Willett. Slavery in the American South, (1970). ISBN 0582314070
- T. C. W. Blanning. Joseph II and Enlightened Despotism, (1970). ISBN 0582314062
- David Smith. Left and Right in Twentieth-Century Europe, (1970). ISBN 0582314089
- Roger Wickson. The Community of the Realm in Thirteenth Century England, (1970). ISBN 0582314011
- Stuart Andrews. Methodism and Society, (1970). ISBN 058231402X
- M. D. Palmer. Henry VIII, (1971). (2nd ed. 1983) ISBN 0582354374
- J. A. P. Jones. King John and Magna Carta, (1971). ISBN 0582314631
- Edward Royle. Radical Politics, 1790-1900: Religion and Unbelief, (1971). ISBN 0582314259
- John Pound. Poverty and Vagrancy in Tudor England, (1971). (2nd ed. 1986) ISBN 0582355087
- Barry Turner. Free Trade and Protection, (1971). ISBN 0582314240
- Brian Lewis. Coal Mining in the Eighteenth and Nineteenth Centuries, (1971). ISBN 0582314224
- Grenfell Morton. Elizabethan Ireland, (1971). ISBN 0582314232
- Paul Adelman. The Rise of the Labour Party, 1880-1945, (1972). (2nd ed. 1986, 3rd ed. 1996) ISBN 0582292107
- John Addy. The Agrarian Revolution, (1972). ISBN 0582314305
- S. J. Houston. James I, (1973). (2nd ed. 1995) ISBN 0582209110
- D. G. Wright. Revolution & Terror in France, 1789-1795, (1974). (2nd ed. 1991) ISBN 0582003792
- M. E. Chamberlain. The Scramble for Africa, (1974). (2nd ed. 1999, 3rd ed. 2010) ISBN 1408220148
- R. C. Birch. The Shaping of the Welfare State, (1974). ISBN 0582352002
- John Hiden. The Weimar Republic, (1974). (2nd ed. 1996) ISBN 0582287065
- Harry Browne. Joseph Chamberlain, Radical and Imperialist, (1974). ISBN 0582352142
- R. C. Birch. 1776: The American Challenge, (1976). ISBN 0582352177
- John Addy, The Textile Revolution, (1976). ISBN 0582352207
- John White. Reconstruction After the American Civil War, (1977). ISBN 0582314291
- Anthony Wood. The Russian Revolution, (1979). (2nd ed. 1986) ISBN 0582355591

== 1980s ==
- M. E. Chamberlain. British Foreign Policy in the Age of Palmerston, (1980). ISBN 0582352576
- Edward Royle. Chartism, (1980). (2nd ed. 1986, 3rd ed. 1996) ISBN 0582290805
- Grenfell Morton. Home Rule and the Irish Question, (1980). ISBN 0582352150
- Stephen Constantine. Unemployment in Britain Between the Wars, (1980). ISBN 0582352320
- David G. Williamson. The Third Reich, (1982). (2nd ed. 1995, 3rd ed. 2002, 4th ed. 2011, 5th ed. 2018) ISBN 1138243558
- Peter Jones. The 1848 Revolutions, (1982). (2nd ed. 1991) ISBN 0582061067
- Paul Adelman. The Decline of the Liberal Party, 1910-1931, (1982). (2nd ed. 1995) ISBN 0582277337
- Toby Barnard. The English Republic, 1649-1660, (1982). (2nd ed. 1997) ISBN 0582080037
- Harry Browne. Spain's Civil War, (1983). (2nd ed. 1996) ISBN 0582289882
- Martin McCauley. Stalin and Stalinism, (1983). (2nd revised ed. 1995, 3rd ed. 2003, 3rd revised ed. 2008, 4th ed. 2015, 5th ed. 2021) ISBN 0367858363
- Martin McCauley. The Origins of the Cold War, 1941-1949, (1983). (2nd ed. 1995, 3rd ed. 2003, 3rd revised ed. 2008, 4th ed. 2015, 5th ed. 2021, 6th ed. 2025) ISBN 1032974583
- John Miller. The Glorious Revolution, (1983). (2nd ed. 1997) ISBN 0582292220
- Robert Tittler. The Reign of Mary I, (1983). (2nd ed. 1991, 3rd ed. 2013) ISBN 1408245345
- Alan Dures. English Catholicism, 1558-1642: Continuity and Change, (1983); revised with Francis Young (2nd ed. 2021) ISBN 0367672308
- R. J. Knecht. French Renaissance Monarchy: Francis I and Henry II, (1984). (2nd ed. 1996) ISBN 0582287073
- David R. Cook. Lancastrians and Yorkists: The Wars of the Roses, (1984). ISBN 058235384X
- Dan O'Sullivan. The Age of Discovery, 1400-1550, (1984). ISBN 0582353726
- Peter Limm. The Thirty Years War, (1984). ISBN 0582353734
- John Mason. The Dissolution of the Austro-Hungarian Empire, 1867-1918, (1985). (2nd ed. 1996) ISBN 0582294665
- D. G. Wright. Napoleon and Europe, (1985). ISBN 0582354579
- John Miller. Restoration England: The Reign of Charles II, (1986); re-titled The Restoration and the England of Charles II (2nd ed. 1997) ISBN 0582292239
- Susan Doran. England and Europe, 1485-1603, (1986). (2nd ed. 1996) ISBN 0582289912
- David G. Williamson. Bismarck and Germany, 1862-1890, (1986). (2nd ed. 1998, 3rd ed. 2010) ISBN 140822318X
- William H. C. Smith. Second Empire and Commune: France, 1848-1871, (1986). (2nd ed. 1996) ISBN 0582287057
- Gordon Martel. The Origins of the First World War, (1987). (2nd ed. 1996, 3rd ed. 2004, 4th ed. 2016) ISBN 1138928658
- Anthony Wood. War in Europe, 1939-1945, (1987). ISBN 0582354552
- Michael A. R. Graves. Elizabethan Parliaments, 1559-1601, (1987). (2nd ed. 1996) ISBN 0582291968
- R. J. Overy. The Origins of the Second World War, (1987). (2nd ed. 1998, 3rd ed. 2014, 4th ed. 2016, 5th ed. 2022) ISBN 0367620820
- Barry Coward. Social Change and Continuity in Early Modern England, 1550-1750, (1988). (revised ed. 1997) ISBN 0582294428
- Alison Brown. The Renaissance, (1988). (2nd ed. 1999, 3rd ed. 2020) ISBN 036715188X
- Martyn Rady. The Emperor Charles V, (1988). ISBN 0582354757
- Robert Gildea. The Third Republic from 1870 to 1914, (1988); re-titled France 1870-1914 (2nd ed. 1996) ISBN 0582292212
- Paul Adelman. Peel and the Conservative Party, 1830-1850, (1989). ISBN 0582355575
- Peter Limm. The Dutch Revolt, 1559-1648, (1989). ISBN 058235594X
- A. L. Macfie. The Eastern Question, 1774-1923, (1989). (revised ed. 1996) ISBN 058229195X
- W. J. Sheils. The English Reformation, 1530-1570, (1989). ISBN 058235398X
- Christopher Harper-Bill. The Pre-Reformation Church in England, 1400-1530, (1989). (revised ed. 1996) ISBN 0582289890
- Eric J. Evans. Britain Before the Reform Act: Politics and Society, 1815-1832, (1989). (2nd ed. 2008) ISBN 058229908X
- R. J. Knecht. The French Wars of Religion, 1559-1598, (1989). (2nd ed. 1996, 3rd ed. 2010) ISBN 140822819X

== 1990s ==
- R. J. Acheson. Radical Puritans in England, 1550-1660, (1990). ISBN 058235515X
- Michael A. R. Graves. Early Tudor Parliaments, 1485-1558, (1990). ISBN 0582034973
- Andrew Johnston. The Protestant Reformation in Europe, (1991). ISBN 0582070201
- Rex Pope. War and Society in Britain, 1899-1948, (1991). ISBN 0582035317
- Ian Porter & Ian D. Armour. Imperial Germany, 1890-1918, (1991). ISBN 0582034965
- Henry G. Roseveare. The Financial Revolution, 1660-1750, (1991). ISBN 0582354498
- Geoffrey Woodward. Philip II, (1992). ISBN 0582072328
- Kevin Jefferys. The Attlee Governments, 1945-1951, (1992). ISBN 0582061059
- Peter Robert Campbell. Louis XIV, (1993). ISBN 058201770X
- Brian Quintrell. Charles I, 1625-1640, (1993). ISBN 0582003547
- R. J. Overy. The Inter-War Crisis, 1919-1939, (1994). (2nd ed. 2007, 2nd revised ed. 2009, 3rd ed. 2016) ISBN 1138963259
- Graham Darby. Spain in the Seventeenth Century, (1994). ISBN 0582072344
- Andrew Foster. The Church of England, 1570-1640, (1994). ISBN 0582355745
- Martyn Bennett. The English Civil War, 1640-1649, (1995). ISBN 0582353920
- Stuart Ball. The Conservative Party and British Politics, 1902-1951, (1995). ISBN 0582080029
- Martin McCauley. The Khrushchev Era, 1953-1964, (1995). ISBN 0582277760
- William Marshall. Peter the Great, (1996). ISBN 0582003555
- Andrew Boxer. The Conservative Governments, 1951-1964, (1996). ISBN 0582209137
- David Englander. Poverty and Poor Law Reform in Nineteenth-Century Britain, 1834-1914: From Chadwick to Booth, (1998). ISBN 0582315549
- Rex Pope. The British Economy since 1914: A Study in Decline?, (1998). ISBN 0582301947
- Stuart Robson. The First World War, (1998). (2nd ed. 2007) ISBN 1405824719
- Martin McCauley. Russia, America and the Cold War, 1949-1991, (1998). (2nd ed. 2004, 2nd revised ed. 2008); re-titled The Cold War 1949-2016 (3rd ed. 2017) ISBN 1138999016
- Martin Clark. The Italian Risorgimento, (1998). (2nd ed. 2009) ISBN 1408205165
- Colin Mackerras. China in Transformation, 1900-1949, (1998). (2nd ed. 2008) ISBN 1405840587
- Harold L. Smith. The British Women's Suffrage Campaign, 1866-1928, (1998). (2nd ed. 2007, 2nd revised ed. 2009) ISBN 1408228238
- Alex May. Britain and Europe since 1945, (1999). ISBN 0582307783
- Nicholas White. Decolonisation: The British Experience since 1945, (1999). (2nd ed. 2014) ISBN 1408245639
- Kirsten E. Schulze. The Arab-Israeli Conflict, (1999). (2nd ed. 2008, 3rd ed. 2016) ISBN 113893335X
- John F. Hutchinson. Late Imperial Russia, 1890-1917, (1999). ISBN 0582327210
- Pamela Pilbeam. Constitutional Monarchy in France, 1814-48, (1999). ISBN 0582312108
- Mitchell K. Hall. The Vietnam War, (1999). (2nd ed. 2007, 3rd ed. 2018) ISBN 113868600X
- Norrie Macqueen. The United Nations since 1945: Peacekeeping and the Cold War, (1999); re-titled The United Nations, Peace Operations and the Cold War (2nd ed. 2011) ISBN 1408237660
- Kenneth Morgan. The Birth of Industrial Britain: Social Change, 1750-1850, (1999). (2nd ed. 2011) ISBN 140823095X
- David Engel. The Holocaust: The Third Reich and the Jews, (1999). (2nd ed. 2012, 3rd ed. 2021) ISBN 1138352756
- Anthony Seldon & Daniel Collings. Britain under Thatcher, (1999). ISBN 0582317142
- Eric J. Evans. Parliamentary Reform, c.1770-1918, (1999). ISBN 0582294673
- S. P. MacKenzie. The Second World War in Europe, (1999). (2nd ed. 2009) ISBN 1405846992
- Jeremy Smith. Britain and Ireland: From Home Rule to Independence, (1999). ISBN 0582301939
- Derek Offord. Nineteenth-Century Russia: Opposition to Autocracy, (1999). ISBN 0582357675

== 2000s ==
- David R. Marples. Lenin's Revolution: Russia, 1917-1921, (2000). ISBN 058231917X
- Mark S. Byrnes. The Truman Years, 1945-1953, (2000). ISBN 0582329043
- Martin Blinkhorn. Fascism and the Right in Europe, 1919-1945, (2000). ISBN 058207021X
- Jennifer D. Keene. The United States and the First World War, (2000). (2nd ed. 2021) ISBN 0367363836
- Albert S. Lindemann. Anti-Semitism before the Holocaust, (2000). ISBN 0582369649
- Clive Emsley. Britain and the French Revolution, (2000). ISBN 0582369614
- Ben Fowkes. Eastern Europe, 1945-1969: From Stalinism to Stagnation, (2000). ISBN 0582326931
- Steven Hugh Lee. The Korean War, (2001). ISBN 0582319889
- Bulent Gokay. Eastern Europe since 1970: Decline of Socialism to Post-Communist Transition, (2001). ISBN 0582328586
- Will Coster. Family and Kinship in England, 1450-1800, (2001). (2nd ed. 2016) ISBN 1138898872
- Tyler Stovall. France Since the Second World War, (2001). ISBN 0582368820
- Stanley Harrold. American Abolitionists, (2001). ISBN 0582357381
- Fredrik Logevall. The Origins of the Vietnam War, (2001). ISBN 0582319188
- Jeff Kingston. Japan in Transformation, 1952-2000, (2001); re-titled Japan in Transformation, 1945-2010 (2nd ed. 2010); re-titled Japan in Transformation, 1945-2020 (3rd ed. 2021) ISBN 1138369616
- Lewis L. Gould & Courtney Q. Shah. America in the Progressive Era, 1890-1917, (2001). (2nd ed. 2021) ISBN 0367434903
- James Sharpe. Witchcraft in Early Modern England, (2001). (2nd ed. 2019) ISBN 1138831166
- David G. Williamson. Germany from Defeat to Partition, 1945-1963, (2001). ISBN 0582292182
- Nicholas Atkin. The French at War, 1934-1944, (2001). ISBN 0582368995
- Ian Copland. India, 1885-1947, (2001). ISBN 0582381738
- Reid Mitchell. The American Civil War, 1861-1865, (2001). ISBN 0582319730
- Mary L. Hanneman. Japan Faces the World, 1925-1952, (2001). ISBN 0582368987
- Erik Goldstein. The First World War Peace Settlements, 1919-1925, (2002). ISBN 0582311454
- John Breuilly. Austria, Prussia and Germany, 1806-1871, (2002). (2nd ed. 2011) ISBN 1408272768
- Jonathan Phillips. The Crusades, 1095-1197, (2002). (2nd ed. 2014) ISBN 1405872934
- Linda Benson. China since 1949, (2002). (2nd ed. 2011, 3rd ed. 2016) ISBN 1138999091
- David Moon. The Abolition of Serfdom in Russia, 1762-1907, (2002). ISBN 058229486X
- Dane Kennedy. Britain and Empire, (2002). ISBN 0582414938
- Susan R. Grayzel. Women and the First World War, (2002). (2nd ed. 2023) ISBN 1138952311
- Richard Damms. The Eisenhower Presidency, 1953-1961, (2002). ISBN 0582368189
- Thabit Abdullah. A Short History of Iraq: From 636 to the Present, (2003). ISBN 0582505798
- P. M. Jones. The French Revolution, 1787-1804, (2003). (2nd ed. 2010, 3rd ed. 2016, 4th ed. 2021) ISBN 0367741326
- William J. Tompson. The Soviet Union under Brezhnev, (2003). ISBN 0582327199
- Clive Emsley. Napoleon: Conquest, Reform and Reorganisation, (2003). (2nd ed. 2014) ISBN 1138777021
- David Ryan. The United States and Europe in the Twentieth Century, (2003). ISBN 058230864X
- Mark S. Joy. American Expansionism, 1783-1860: A Manifest Destiny?, (2003). ISBN 0582369657
- Frank McDonough. Hitler and the Rise of the Nazi Party, (2003). (2nd ed. 2012) ISBN 140826921X
- Bruce J. Dierenfield. The Civil Rights Movement: The Black Freedom Struggle in America, (2004). (revised ed. 2008, 2nd ed. 2021) ISBN 1138681814
- Nancy L. Clark & William H. Worger. South Africa: The Rise and Fall of Apartheid, (2004). (2nd ed. 2011, 3rd ed. 2016, 4th ed. 2022) ISBN 0367551004
- David R. Marples. The Collapse of the Soviet Union, 1985-1991, (2004). ISBN 0582505992
- Jane Samson. Race and Empire, (2004). ISBN 0582418372
- Alasdair Blair. The European Union since 1945, (2005). (2nd ed. 2010, 3rd ed. 2025) ISBN 0367279622
- Douglas M. Peers. India under Colonial Rule, 1700-1885, (2006). ISBN 058231738X
- Alan James. The Origins of French Absolutism, 1598-1661, (2006). ISBN 0582369002
- Giuseppe Finaldi. Mussolini and Italian Fascism, (2008). ISBN 1405812532
- Lee Baker. The Second World War on the Eastern Front, (2009). ISBN 1405840633

== 2010s ==
- June Hannam. Feminism, (2011). ISBN 140825557X
- David Peterson del Mar. Environmentalism, (2011). ISBN 1408255588
- Wendy Singer. Independent India, 1947-2000, (2011). ISBN 0582414946
- Mark Sandle. Communism, (2011). ISBN 1408264501
- Paul Dixon & Eamonn O'Kane. Northern Ireland since 1969, (2011). ISBN 1405801352
- Martyn Housden. The League of Nations and the Organization of Peace, (2011). ISBN 1408228246
- Paul Bowles. Capitalism, (2012). (2nd ed. 2015, 3rd ed. 2023) ISBN 1032116935
- Laura Gowing. Gender Relations in Early Modern England, (2012); re-titled Gender in Early Modern England (2nd ed. 2022) ISBN 0367548291
- Rosemary H. T. O'Kane. Terrorism, (2012). (2nd ed. 2016) ISBN 1408282577
- Robin Walz. Modernism, (2012). (2nd ed. 2014) ISBN 1408264498
- Nicholas Morton. The Medieval Military Orders, 1120-1314, (2012). ISBN 1408249588
- John A. Kirk. Martin Luther King, Jr. and the Civil Rights Movement, (2013). ISBN 140822013X
- Richard Jones. The Medieval Natural World, (2013). ISBN 1408248891
- Marie Coleman. The Irish Revolution, 1916-1923, (2013). ISBN 140827910X
- Alasdair Blair. Britain and the World since 1945, (2014). ISBN 1408248298
- Niall Christie. Muslims and Crusaders: Christianity's Wars in the Middle East, 1095-1382, from the Islamic Sources, (2014). (2nd ed. 2020) ISBN 113854311X
- Anne Lawrence-Mathers & Carolina Escobar-Vargas. Magic and Medieval Society, (2014). ISBN 1408270501
- Geoffrey Swain. Trotsky and the Russian Revolution, (2014). ISBN 1447901444
- B. J. C. McKercher. Britain, America, and the Special Relationship since 1941, (2017). ISBN 1138800015
- Timothy Stapleton. Africa: War and Conflict in the Twentieth Century, (2018). ISBN 1138281964
- Deborah Brunton. Medicine in Modern Britain, 1780-1950, (2018). ISBN 1138784230
- Kenneth J. Heineman. The Rise of Contemporary Conservatism in the United States, (2018). ISBN 1138096261
- Daniel Lomas & Christopher John Murphy. Intelligence and Espionage: Secrets and Spies, (2019). ISBN 1138303135
- Gwenda Morgan & Peter Rushton. The British and the French in the Atlantic, 1650-1800: Comparisons and Contrasts, (2019). ISBN 1138657581

== 2020s ==
- Adam Burns. The United States, 1865-1920: Reuniting a Nation, (2020). ISBN 1138482420
- Robert M. Owens. Indian Wars and the Struggle for Eastern North America, 1763-1842, (2020). ISBN 0367492059
- Kristen L. Anderson. Immigration in American History, (2021). ISBN 0367415720
- Susan Elizabeth Ramirez. A History of Colonial Latin America from First Encounters to Independence, (2021). ISBN 0367408155
- Kenneth J. Bindas. The New Deal and American Society, 1933-1941, (2021). ISBN 0367489058
- Sandra Wilson, Michael Sturma, Arjun Subrahmanyan, Dean Aszkielowicz & J. Charles Schencking. The U.S. and the War in the Pacific, 1941-45, (2022). ISBN 0367547562
- Joan Marie Johnson. The Woman Suffrage Movement in the United States, (2022). ISBN 0367487616
- Mary Ziegler. Reproduction and the Constitution in the United States, (2022). ISBN 1032102500
- Timothy N. Thurber. The Nixon Presidency, (2022). ISBN 0367500922
- Philip D. Dillard. The American Civil War: A Racial Reckoning, (2022). ISBN 036748563X
- Sarah Ifft Decker. Jewish Women in the Medieval World, 500-1500 CE, (2022). ISBN 0367612720
- Scott Eastman & Natalia Sobrevilla Perea. Independence and Nation-Building in Latin America: Race and Identity in the Crucible of War, (2022). ISBN 0367820714
- Anna French. The Reformations in Britain, 1520-1603, (2022). ISBN 1032021896
- Gavin Benke. Capitalism and Individualism in America, (2022). ISBN 0367547600
- Steven P. Remy. War Crimes: Law, Politics, & Armed Conflict in the Modern World, (2023). ISBN 0367632926
- Michael R. Cude. Woodrow Wilson: The First World War and Modern Internationalism, (2023). ISBN 0367543346
- Michael Bintley & Kate Franklin. Landscapes and Environments of the Middle Ages, (2023). ISBN 0367640724
- Pamela Pilbeam. The Revolting French, 1787-1889, (2023). ISBN 1408204916
- Robert Weis. The Mexican Revolution, (2024). ISBN 1032317124
- Jeremy A. Yellen. Japan at War, 1914-1952 (2024). ISBN 0367675765
- Prudence Flowers. The Reagan Revolution (2025). ISBN 0367564513
- Anna Clayfield. Revolutionary Movements in Latin America since 1910 (2025). ISBN 1032289694
- William K. Bolt & Scott Kaufman. Impeachment in U.S. History (2025). ISBN 1032933917
- Margaret C. Rung. The Great Depression in the United States (2026). ISBN 1032332077
- Andrew J. Kirkendall. Paired Lives in Latin America's Cold War (2026). ISBN 103251017X
