= Alison Brown (disambiguation) =

Alison Brown (born 1962) is an American musician.

Alison Brown or Allison Brown may also refer to:

- Alison Brown (footballer) (born 1997), Australian rules footballer
- Alison Brown (historian), British professor of history
- Alison Rempel Brown (born c. 1958), American nonprofit executive
- Alison Brown (computer scientist)
- Allison Brown (born 1968), American model

== See also ==
- Alison Browner (born 1957), Irish opera singer
- Alison Brownless (born 1962), British rower
- Ally Brown (soccer, born 2003), American soccer player
