= List of honorary fellows of Sidney Sussex College, Cambridge =

Sidney Sussex College, Cambridge awards honorary fellowships to people who have distinguished themselves in various walks of life.

- Tony Badger
- John Bennet
- Karan Bilimoria, Baron Bilimoria
- Asa Briggs, Baron Briggs
- Alison Brown
- Sir Simon Campbell
- Tsitsi Dangarembga
- Dame Jo da Silva
- John Drewienkiewicz
- Sir William Gage
- Sir Patrick Garland
- Ira Katznelson
- Arthur Li
- Paddy Lowe
- John Madden
- Sir Ravinder Maini
- Jo Martin
- Ann Mather
- Prakash Melwani
- John Osborn
- David Owen, Baron Owen
- Andrew Rawnsley
- Sir Peter Riddell
- Ingrid Simler, Lady Simler
- David Stevens, Baron Stevens of Ludgate
- Herman Waldmann
- Barbara Young, Baroness Young of Old Scone
