= Longman Companions to History =

Book series

The Longman Companion to Napoleonic Europe, Clive Emsley, 1993. 2014 edition in the uniform design currently in use.

The Longman Companions to History is a book series, published by Longman and under the editorship of Chris Cook and John Stevenson, that provides a one volume overview of a major area of historical study. The first volumes were published in 1993. The most recent volumes was published in 2004.

== Titles ==
=== 1990s ===
- The Longman Companion to Britain in the Era of the Two World Wars, 1914-45. Andrew Thorpe, 1993. ISBN 0582077710
- The Longman Companion to Cold War and Detente, 1941-91. John W. Young, 1993. ISBN 0582061733
- The Longman Companion to Napoleonic Europe. Clive Emsley, 1993. ISBN 0582072247
- The Longman Companion to European Nationalism, 1789-1920. Raymond Pearson, 1993. ISBN 0582072298
- The Longman Companion to Nazi Germany. Tim Kirk, 1995. ISBN 0582063760
- The Longman Companion to the Tudor Age. Rosemary O'Day, 1995. ISBN 0582067251
- The Longman Companion to Britain since 1945. Chris Cook & John Stevenson, 1995. ISBN 0582070309
- The Longman Companion to America in the Era of the Two World Wars, 1910-1945. Patrick Renshaw, 1996. ISBN 0582091160
- The Longman Companion to the Stuart Age, 1603-1714. John Wroughton, 1997. ISBN 058225776X
- The Longman Companion to Russia Since 1914. Martin McCauley, 1997. ISBN 0582276403
- The Longman Companion to European Decolonisation in the Twentieth Century. Muriel E. Chamberlain, 1998. ISBN 0582077745
- The Longman Companion to the European Reformation, c.1500-1618. Mark Greengrass, 1998. ISBN 058206175X
- The Longman Companion to Germany since 1945. Adrian Webb, 1998. ISBN 0582307368
- The Longman Companion to the Middle East Since 1914. Ritchie Ovendale, 1998. ISBN 0582315557
- The Longman Companion to America, Russia and the Cold War, 1941-1998. John W. Young, 1999. ISBN 0582369010
- The Longman Companion to Britain in the Eighteenth Century, 1688-1820. Jeremy Gregory & John Stevenson, 1999. ISBN 0582279895
- The Longman Companion to Britain in the Nineteenth Century, 1815-1914. Chris Cook, 1999. ISBN 0582279909
- The Longman Companion to the European Union, 1945-99. Alasdair Blair, 1999. ISBN 0582368855
- The Longman Companion to Renaissance Europe, 1390-1530. Stella Fletcher, 1999. ISBN 0582298814
- The Longman Companion to the Labour Party, 1900-98. Harry Harmer, 1999. ISBN 0582312140

=== 2000s ===
- The Longman Companion to the Formation of the European Empires, 1488-1920. Muriel E. Chamberlain, 2000. ISBN 0582369800
- The Longman Companion to Imperial Russia, 1689-1917. David Longley, 2000. ISBN 0582319897
- The Longman Companion to the Conservative Party: Since 1830. Nick Crowson, 2001. ISBN 0582312914
- The Longman Companion to Slavery, Emancipation and Civil Rights. Harry Harmer, 2001. ISBN 058240438X
- The Longman Companion to Central and Eastern Europe Since 1919. Adrian Webb, 2002. ISBN 0582437326
- The Longman Companion to the First World War: Europe, 1914-1918. Colin Nicolson, 2004. ISBN 0582289823
