= Judge Garland =

Judge Garland may refer to:

- Merrick Garland, a United States lawyer, attorney general, and former federal judge
- Patrick Garland (judge), a high court judge in the United Kingdom
- Rice Garland (1799–1863), judge of the Louisiana Supreme Court
