= Paul Adelman =

British historian

Paul Adelman is a British historian who specialises in British political history of the nineteenth century and the first half of the twentieth century. Adelman has written four volumes in the popular Seminar Studies in History series, intended for undergraduate and younger study, and two in the Access to History series from Hodder intended for pre-university study. Adelman has also written for a number of journals, including History Today. He is a former school teacher and reader in history at Kingston University.

== Selected publications ==
- Gladstone, Disraeli and Later Victorian Politics. Longman, 1970. (Seminar Studies in History) (2nd edn 1983, 3rd 1997)
- The Rise of the Labour Party 1880-1945. Longman, 1972. (Seminar Studies in History)
- The Decline of the Liberal Party, 1910-31. Longman, 1982. (Seminar Studies in History) ISBN 0582353270
- Victorian radicalism: The middle-class experience 1830-1914. Longman, 1984. (Studies in Modern History) ISBN 0582491975
- British Politics in the 1930s and 1940s. Cambridge University Press, 1987. (Cambridge Topics in History) ISBN 0521317290
- Peel and the Conservative Party 1830-1850. Longman, 1989. (Seminar Studies In History)
- Britain: Domestic Politics, 1939-64. Hodder Education, 1994. (Access to History) ISBN 034059702X
- Great Britain and the Irish Question 1798-1921. Hodder Education, 2005. (With Robert Pearce) (Access to History)
