= Lee and Rose Warner Nature Center =

Coordinates: 45°10′21″N 92°49′55″W

The owl feather sign welcomes thousands of visitors each year.

The Lee and Rose Warner Nature Center (WNC) was an outdoor education facility with a focus on natural history. It is located in Marine on St. Croix, Minnesota, northern Washington County about 30 miles (48 km) northeast of St. Paul, Minnesota. Warner was the first private nature center in the state of Minnesota. With funding from the Warner Foundation, at its closing WNC was the only nature center in the state of Minnesota to still provide free on-site programming to schools.

On September 5, 2019, the Science Museum and Manitou Fund announced the Warner Nature Center would be closing, with operations winding down fully by December 31, 2019.

== Mission ==
"To build lasting relationships between people and the natural world."

== Site ==
The Lee and Rose Warner Nature Center was a 700-acre (2.8 km^{2}) outdoor school set in undeveloped woodland, marsh, lake, bog, grasslands. The site also included a restoration prairie and savanna. There are over six miles (10 km) of trails on the property but they are not marked and were only for use by groups who have booked a program with the naturalist staff.

The center adjoined Wilder Forest and the combined area of the two organizations approaches 2,000 acres (8.1 km^{2}).

Warner was also the western anchor for the metro greenways corridor which protects a greenway of land for five miles (8 km) between WNC and the St. Croix River The whole corridor protects approximately 2,400 acres (9.7 km^{2}).

Warner is home to a wild population of threatened Blanding's turtles. In part because of their presence, the Minnesota Department of Natural Resources has designated the land Warner sits on as important for species in greatest conservation need and a Regionally Significant Ecological Area with a level 3 designation, the highest possible, .

== History ==
WNC was the oldest private nature center in the state of Minnesota and served about 17,000 people per year, 9,000 of which were school children, with outdoor natural history programming. The first director, Bernie Fashingbauer began work in 1965 as construction began on the main building. The project was initiated by the St. Paul Science Museum (now the Science Museum of Minnesota), The Amherst H. Wilder Foundation and the Junior League of St. Paul. By the spring and fall of 1966, orientation sessions began for teachers. The first students arrived on site in the fall of 1967. At the time, the center was known as both the Wilder Nature Center and The Science Museum Nature Center.

In 1970, the Lee and Rose Warner Foundation purchased 300 acres (1.2 km^{2}) of land and the existing nature center buildings from the Amherst H Wilder Foundation to serve as a memorial to founders Lee and Rose Warner of St Paul. Warner Nature Center was still associated with the Science Museum of Minnesota at the time of closing and financially supported primarily through the generosity of the Lee and Rose Warner Foundation.

Warner has a strong legacy of volunteerism. When Bernie Fashingbauer told people he was going to use volunteer trail guides to take groups of students out on the trails people told him he was crazy. Forty years later, over 100 volunteers continued to dedicate their time to students.

Warner employed 8 full-time staff, two part-time staff, and up to two interns.

== Awards ==
The Warner Nature Center was recognized with an Award of Excellence by the Mutual of Omaha's Wildlife Heritage Center for displaying leadership and vision in promoting awareness and appreciation of our natural world.

== Partnerships ==
The Warner Nature Center was associated with the Science Museum of Minnesota one of the nations leading science education centers.

Warner was a partner with Bird Conservation Minnesota.

Warner was a partner site with the Cornell Laboratory of Ornithology on the NestWatch program. Warner staff provide training workshops and maintain online camera feeds of nests in the spring.
