= David England =

David England may refer to:

- Dave England (born 1969), an American stunt performer and television personality
- David England (rower) (born 1956), an Australian rower and coach
- David England (sprinter), a Welsh athlete

== See also ==
- David Englander
