= The Protectorate =

British republic (1653–1659)

Commonwealth of England, Scotland and Ireland
- 1653–1659
- Top: Naval ensign (1653–1658); Bottom: Naval ensign (1658–1659) Coat of arms (1653–1659)
- Motto: Pax quaeritur bello ("Peace is sought through war")
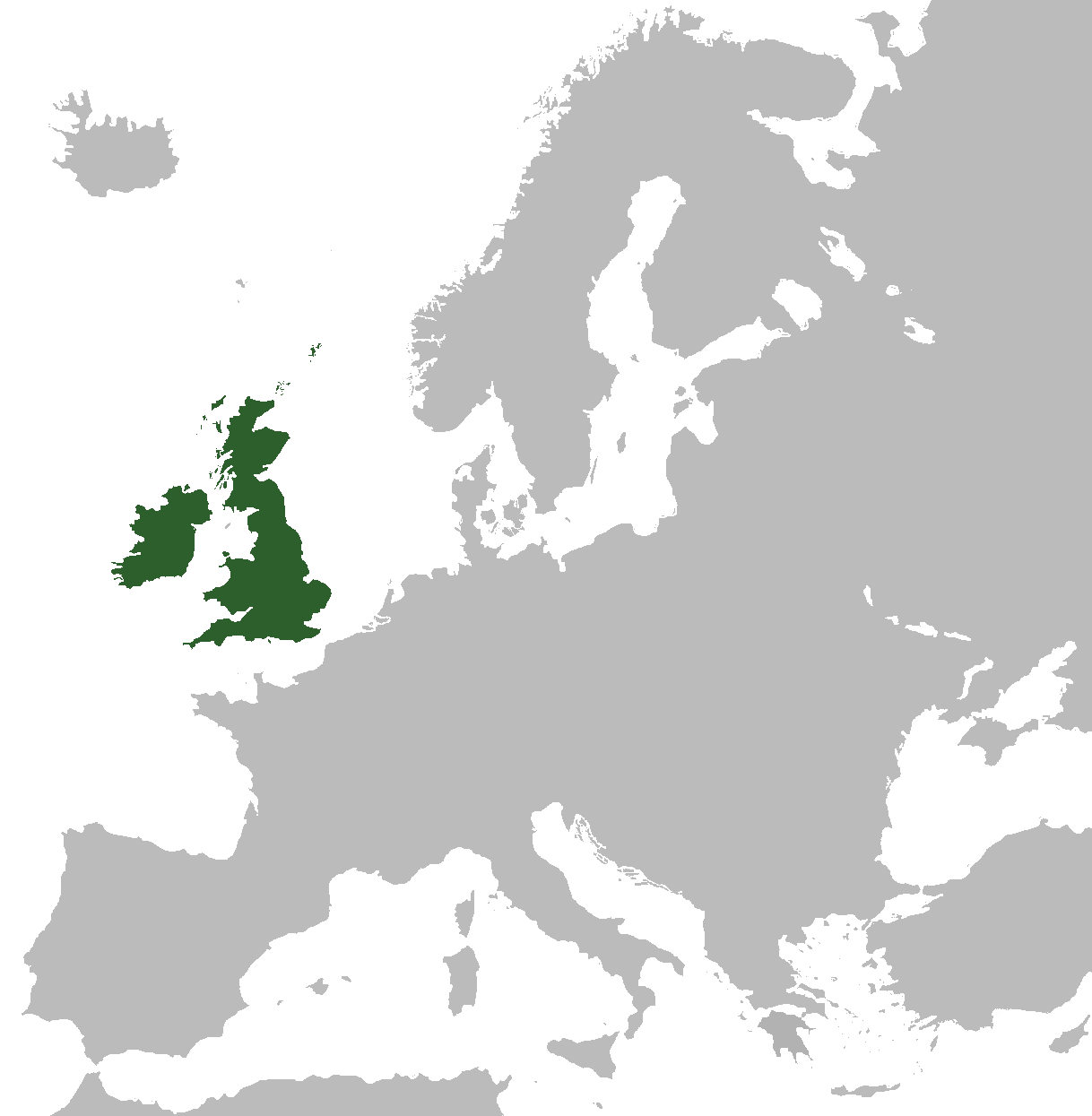
- The territory of the Commonwealth in 1659
- Capital: London
- Official languages: English (Early Modern)
- Other languages: Scots (Middle Scots); Welsh (Late Modern); Irish (Early Modern); Scottish Gaelic; Latin; Cornish; Angloromani
- Religion: Protestantism (state religion); Catholic (large minority); Judaism (small minority)
- Government: Unitary parliamentary republic with an executive presidency under a military dictatorship
- Lord Protector
  - 1653–1658: Oliver Cromwell
  - 1658–1659: Richard Cromwell
- Legislature: Parliament
  - Upper house: Other House (1658–59)
  - Lower house: House of Commons
- History
  - Instrument of Government: 16 December 1653
  - Tender of Union: 12 April 1654
  - Humble Petition and Advice: 25 May 1657
  - R. Cromwell's resignation: 25 May 1659
- Currency: Pound sterling (England and Wales); Pound Scots (Scotland); Irish pound (Ireland)
Preceded by	Succeeded by
Commonwealth of England; Kingdom of Scotland	Commonwealth of England
- Today part of: Republic of Ireland; United Kingdom

The Protectorate, officially the Commonwealth of England, Scotland and Ireland, was the British republic that lasted from 16 December 1653 to 25 May 1659. The kingdoms of England, Scotland, and Ireland, with their associated territories were joined together in the Commonwealth of England, governed by a Lord Protector, the head of state. It began when Barebone's Parliament was dissolved, and the Instrument of Government appointed Oliver Cromwell as Lord Protector of the Commonwealth. Cromwell died in September 1658 and was succeeded by his son Richard Cromwell.

Richard resigned in May 1659 due to his inability to control either the Army or Parliament. He was replaced by the English Committee of Safety, which dissolved the Third Protectorate Parliament, and reseated the Rump Parliament dismissed by his father in April 1653. This marked the end of the Protectorate, with the Rump acting as the legislature and the English Council of State as the executive.

== Background ==
Since 1649 until the Protectorate, England, Ireland and later Scotland had been governed as a republic by the Council of State and the Rump Parliament. The Act declaring England to be a Commonwealth, which established England, together with "all the Dominions and Territoryes thereunto belonging", as a republic, had been passed on 19 May 1649, following the trial and execution of Charles I in January of that year. All of Ireland came under the same governance after the successful Cromwellian conquest of Ireland with the appointment of a Parliamentary military governor in Dublin.

On 20 April 1653, after learning that Parliament was attempting to stay in session despite an agreement to dissolve and having failed to come up with a working constitution, Cromwell, with the backing of the Grandees in the Army Council, marched soldiers into the debating chamber and forcibly ended the Rump's session.

Within a month of the Rump's dismissal, Oliver Cromwell, on the advice of Thomas Harrison and with the support of other officers in the Army, sent a request to Congregational churches in every county to nominate those they considered fit to take part in the new government. On 4 July a Nominated Assembly, nicknamed the "Assembly of Saints" or Barebone's Parliament after one of its members, took on the role of more traditional English Parliaments. However, it proved just as difficult for the Grandees to control and was in addition a subject of popular ridicule, and so on 8 December, MPs who supported Cromwell engineered its end by passing a dissolution motion at a time of day at which the house usually had few members in attendance. Those who refused to recognise the motion were forcibly ejected by soldiers.

The collapse of the radical consensus that had spawned the Nominated Assembly led to the Grandees passing the Instrument of Government in the Council of State, which paved the way for the Protectorate.

== Rule of Oliver Cromwell ==
After the dissolution of Barebone's Parliament, John Lambert put forward a new constitution known as the Instrument of Government, closely modelled on the Heads of Proposals. It made Cromwell Lord Protector for life to undertake "the chief magistracy and the administration of government". He had the power to call and dissolve parliaments but was obliged under the Instrument to seek the majority vote of the Council of State. However, Cromwell's power was also buttressed by his continuing popularity among the army, which he had built up during the civil wars and subsequently prudently guarded. Cromwell was sworn in as Lord Protector on 16 December 1653.

=== England and Wales: the Major-Generals ===
Oliver Cromwell

The First Protectorate Parliament met on 3 September 1654, and after some initial gestures approving appointments previously made by Cromwell, began to work on a moderate programme of constitutional reform. Rather than opposing Parliament's bill, Cromwell dissolved it on 22 January 1655. After a royalist uprising, led by Sir John Penruddock, Cromwell, influenced by Lambert, divided England into military districts ruled by Army Major-Generals, who answered only to him. The fifteen major generals and deputy major generals, called "godly governors" were central not only to national security but also to Cromwell's moral crusade. The generals supervised militia forces and security commissions, collected taxes and ensured support for the government in the English provinces and in Wales. Commissioners for securing the peace of the commonwealth were appointed to work with them in every county. While a few of the commissioners were career politicians, most were zealous Puritans who welcomed the major-generals, with open arms and embraced their work with enthusiasm. However, the major-generals lasted less than a year. Many feared that they threatened their reform efforts and authority. The major-generals' position was further harmed by a tax proposal by Major General John Desborough to provide financial backing for their work, which the Second Protectorate Parliament, instated in September 1656, voted down for fear of a permanent military state. Ultimately, however, Cromwell's failure to support his men by sacrificing them to his opponents caused their demise. Their activities between November 1655 and September 1656 had, however, reopened the wounds of the 1640s and deepened antipathies to the regime.

=== Scotland and Ireland ===
By the end of 1653, the Protectorate was in the unique position of being the first government in history to be in control of the entirety of the British Isles. The scope of the Instrument of Government extended to the governance of Scotland and Ireland; it provided for representatives from Scotland and Ireland, as well as England and Wales, to sit in Parliament in London.

The regime's policy towards Ireland and Scotland initially had three components: secure the recent conquest of those countries with armies of occupation; punish those who had opposed the English conquest; reshape both countries in the image of England. Barry Coward observed:

While there were reforming aspirations and coercion in the Protectorate's British policies, these can hardly be said to amount to a 'British vision' designed to create a new British state from the separate kingdoms of England, Ireland and Scotland. What the regime seems to have intended was the anglicisation of the British Isles.

==== Scotland ====
Following the defeat of the Scottish army in the Anglo-Scottish war of 1650 to 1652 the Scottish government was dissolved and the English Parliament absorbed the kingdom of Scotland into the Commonwealth. Military rule was imposed, with 10,000 English troops garrisoned across the country to quell the threat of local uprisings. Negotiations between commissioners of the English Parliament and the deputies of Scotland's shires and burghs began to formalise the incorporation of Scottish legal and political structures into the new British state. Under the terms of the Tender of Union, a declaration of the English Parliament proclaimed in Scotland in 1652, the Scottish Parliament was permanently dissolved and Scotland was given 30 seats in the Westminster Parliament. In 1654, the Council of State issued an "Ordinance for uniting Scotland into one Commonwealth with England", which would be called the "Commonwealth of England, Scotland and Ireland". This remained the legal basis of the union until the Ordinance became an Act of Union under the Second Protectorate Parliament on 26 June 1657.

Initially, the country was run by eight English commissioners. In 1655 Lord Broghill was appointed as President of a new Council for Scotland which was part of an attempt to recast the government along civilian lines and to begin to win over the major landholders to the regime. The council was made up of six Englishmen and two Scots.

==== Ireland ====
With the completion of the Cromwellian conquest of Ireland in 1653, the Protectorate implemented the Rump Parliament's Act for the Settlement of Ireland 1652 which directed that large numbers of the Irish population be executed and that most Catholic property owners should lose their lands and be made to relocate to the west of the country. The English army of occupation stood at 9,000 in 1657, although it had been reduced significantly from its 1649 complement of 35,000. The Instrument of Government specified that Ireland was entitled to 30 seats in the Parliament in London, the same number as Scotland. Initially, the country was ruled on behalf of the Protectorate by Cromwell's son-in-law, Charles Fleetwood, a military governor with the title Lord Deputy of Ireland, and a group of hard line radical parliamentary commissioners. As in Scotland, a more moderate policy was adopted in 1655. In that year, Cromwell sent his son, Henry, to Ireland who assumed control over the country and adopted a more conciliatory approach to the country's administration.

=== North American colonies ===
England's overseas possessions in this period included Newfoundland, the New England Confederation, the Providence Plantation, the Virginia Colony, the Province of Maryland and islands in the West Indies. Cromwell soon secured the submission of these and largely left them to their own affairs, intervening only to curb other Puritans who had seized control of Maryland Colony at Severn battle, by his confirming the former Roman Catholic proprietorship and edict of tolerance there. Of all the English dominions, Virginia was the most resentful of Cromwell's rule, and Cavalier emigration there mushroomed during the Protectorate.

=== Foreign policy ===
During this period, Oliver Cromwell also faced challenges in foreign policy. The First Anglo-Dutch War, which had broken out in 1652, against the Dutch Republic, was eventually won by Admiral Robert Blake in 1654. Having negotiated peace with the Dutch, Cromwell then proceeded to engage the Spanish Empire in warfare through his Western Design. That involved secret preparations for an attack on the Spanish colonies in the Caribbean and resulted in the invasion of Jamaica, which then became an English colony. The Lord Protector became aware of the contribution the Jewish community made to the economic success of the Netherlands, now England's leading commercial rival. Cromwell's toleration of private worship of non-Puritans led to his encouragement of Jews to return to England, 350 years after their banishment by Edward I, in the hope that they would help speed up the recovery of the country after the disruption of the Civil Wars.

In 1655 a crypto-Jew known as Simón de Casseres proposed to Cromwell a plan to take over Spanish-rule Chile with only four ships and a thousand men. However English plans to engage in Chile came into fruition only in 1669, with John Narborough's expedition.

After the Battle of the Dunes (1658), the town of Dunkirk was awarded by France to the Protectorate. It would be sold back to France by Charles II in 1662.

=== Increase in Cromwell's powers ===
Standard of Oliver Cromwell

In 1657, Oliver Cromwell was offered the crown by Parliament as part of a revised constitutional settlement. That presented him with a dilemma since he had been instrumental in abolishing the monarchy. Cromwell agonised for six weeks over the offer. He was attracted by the prospect of stability that it held out, but in a speech on 13 April 1657, he made it clear that God's providence had spoken against the office of king: "I would not seek to set up that which Providence hath destroyed and laid in the dust, and I would not build Jericho again". (Note: The reference is to Joshua's curse upon any man who would rebuild Jericho and to its fulfli in Hiel the Bethelite, who according to 1 Kings 16:34 "laid the foundation thereof in Abiram his firstborn, and set up the gates thereof in his youngest son Segub".)

Instead, Cromwell was ceremonially reinstalled as Lord Protector, with greater powers than had previously been granted him under this title, at Westminster Hall. He sat upon King Edward's Chair, which had been specially moved from Westminster Abbey for the occasion. The event in part echoed a coronation by using many of its symbols and regalia, such as a purple ermine-lined robe, a sword of justice, a sceptre and an ermine-lined coronet but not a crown or an orb. However, a crown and an orb were present on the lord protector's seal. However, most notably, the office of Lord Protector was still not to become hereditary though Cromwell was now able to nominate his own successor. Cromwell's new rights and powers were laid out in the Humble Petition and Advice, a legislative instrument that replaced the Instrument of Government. Cromwell himself, however, was at pains to minimise his role by describing himself as a constable or watchman. However, Cromwell "had never gained the willing consent of the nation", and the Protectorate relied on armed force.

== Rule of Richard Cromwell ==
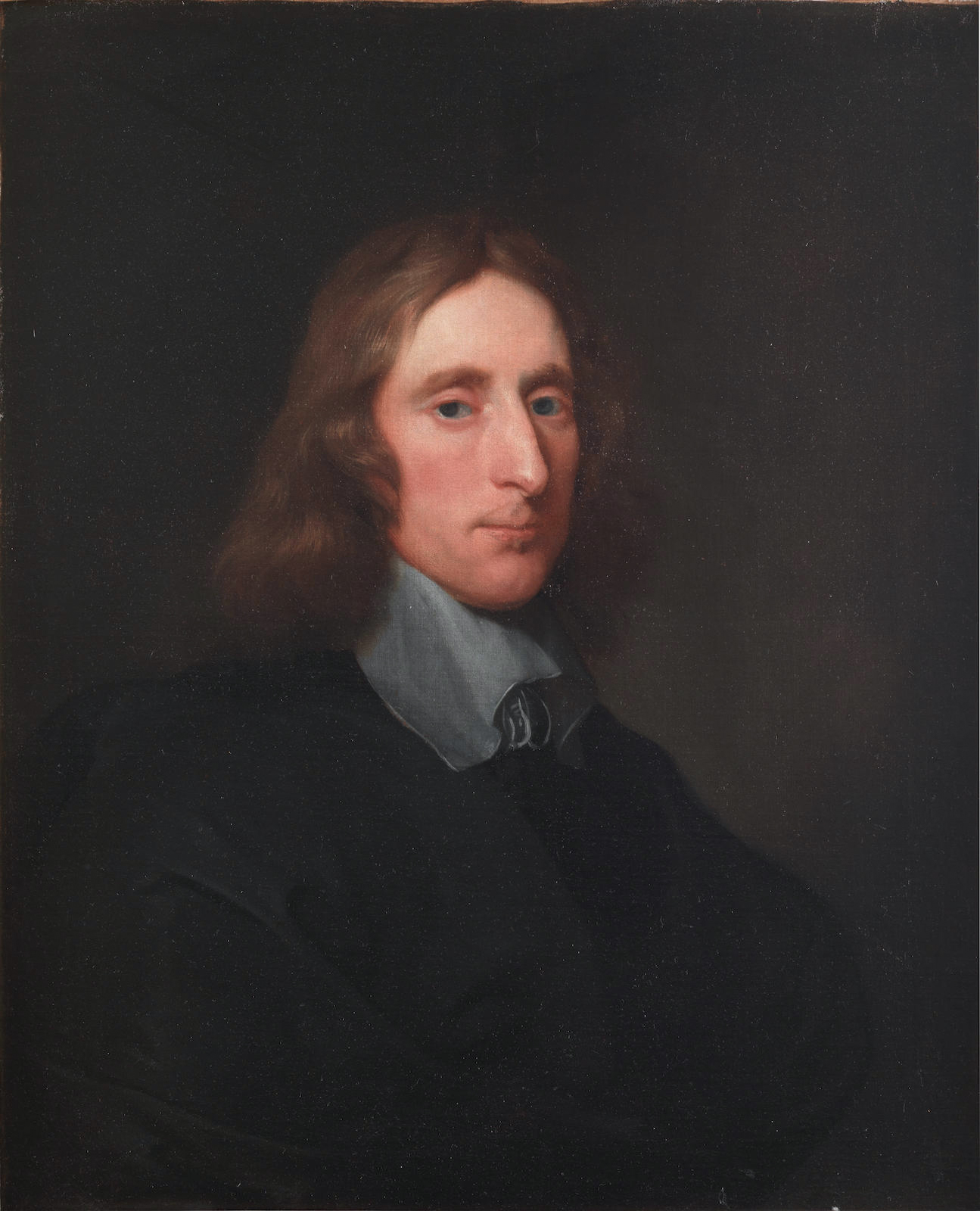
Richard Cromwell

After Oliver's death in September 1658, his third son, Richard Cromwell, succeeded as Lord Protector. The impression of strength and durability of the Protectorate when Richard succeeded proved deceptive; the lack of unity would destroy the Protectorate.

Richard sought to expand the basis for the Protectorate beyond the army to civilians. He summoned a Parliament in 1659, but the republicans engaged in "endless obstruction and filibustering", attacked the "quasi-monarchal" aspects of the Protectorate and "condemned Oliver's rule as a period of tyranny and economic depression". Both father and son were seen as leading a tyrannical government of the "Sword", in diametric opposition to a "Civil" government with a free parliament.

Three things undermined the Protectorate: the "anxieties of the army, the irresponsibility of the Parliament and the rashness of Richard Cromwell". What ultimately prevented the retention of the Protectorate was the opposition of the "junior officers" and "many of the common soldiers".

Richard had proved that he could neither manage the Parliament nor control the army. On 7 May, a Committee of Safety was formed on the authority of the Rump Parliament, displacing the Protector's Council of State, and was in turn replaced by a new Council of State on 19 May 1659. "Richard was never formally deposed or arrested, but allowed to fade away. The Protectorate was treated as having been from the first a mere usurpation".

== Aftermath and restoration ==
After Richard Cromwell was removed from power by the Grandees of the New Army, the Rump Parliament was instated and soon after was replaced by the Committee of Safety and Council of State under the authority of Charles Fleetwood. The Committee of Safety then ordered General John Lambert to meet George Monck, the commander of English forces in Scotland and a royalist sympathizer, to force Monck's submission or defeat. Monck instead marched south. As Lambert's army marched north, his ranks began to dwindle and he was ultimately forced to retreat back to London.

When Monck reached London he allowed Presbyterian members, who had been removed by Pride's Purge, to re-enter Parliament on 21 February 1660. On 16 March 1660, the Long Parliament dissolved itself after preparations were made for the Convention Parliament of 1660 to succeed it. On 4 April 1660, Charles II proclaimed the Declaration of Breda, which granted a pardon for all crimes committed during the Civil War and the Interregnum to those who recognised him as the lawful king. On 8 May 1660, the Convention Parliament declared Charles II the lawful successor of Charles I and king. The Convention Parliament then began the transition back to monarchy through the passage of the Restoration Settlement.

According to Derek Hirst, outside of politics and religion, the 1640s and the 1650s saw a revived economy characterised by growth in manufacturing, the elaboration of financial and credit instruments and the commercialisation of communication. The gentry found time for leisure activities such as horse racing and bowling. In high culture, important innovations included the development of a mass market for music, increased scientific research and an expansion of publishing. All of those trends were discussed in depth at the newly-established coffeehouses.

== See also ==
- Knights, baronets and peers of the Protectorate
