= A. L. Macfie =

British historian

Alexander Lyon Macfie is a British historian who has written widely on historiography and Orientalism. Macfie completed his undergraduate studies at the University of Manchester in the 1950s, later completing a PhD. More recently, he has been closely associated with the Institute of Historical Research at the University of London and their philosophy of history seminar, attendance at which has influenced his thinking on historiography.

== Selected publications ==
- The Straits question in the First World War, 1914-18. Cass, 1983.
- The Straits question 1908-36. Institute for Balkan Studies, Thessaloniki, 1993.
- The Eastern Question, 1774-1923. London: Longman. 1989. ISBN 978-0-582-35602-3. (Seminar Studies in History) (2nd edition, 1996) ISBN 0582356024
- Atatürk. Longman, London, 1994. ISBN 0582078636
- The End of the Ottoman Empire, 1908-1923. Routledge, 1998.
- Orientalism: A Reader. Edinburgh University Press, Edinburgh, 2000. (Editor) ISBN 0748614419
- Orientalism. Routledge, 2002.
- Eastern Influences on Western Philosophy: A Reader. Edinburgh University Press, Edinburgh, 2003. (Editor) ISBN 074861740X
- The Philosophy of History Talks Given at the Institute of Historical Research, London, 2000-2006. Palgrave Macmillan, 2006. ISBN 9780230004573
- The Fiction of History. Routledge, Abingdon, 2014. (Routledge Approaches to History) ISBN 978-0-415-72301-5
