= Campaign Chronicles =

Napoleon's Polish Gamble: Eylau & Friedland, Christopher Summerville, 2005.

Campaign Chronicles is a non-fiction book series from Pen & Sword publishers that analyses pivotal battles in history and the men and armies that participated in them. The first book in the series was Napoleon's Polish Gamble: Eylau & Friedland (September 2005) by Christopher Summerville, who is also the series editor.

== Titles ==
- Armada 1588. John Barratt, 2005. ISBN 9781844153237
- Attack on the Somme. Martin Pegler, 2006. ISBN 9781844153978
- Caesar's Gallic Triumph. Peter Inker, 2008. ISBN 9781844156757
- Dunkirk and the Fall of France. Geoffrey Stewart, 2008. ISBN 9781844158034
- Napoleon's Polish Gamble: Eylau & Friedland. Christopher Summerville, 2005. ISBN 9781844152605
- Passchendaele: The Hollow Victory. Martin Marix Evans, 2005. ISBN 9781844153688
- Poland Betrayed. David G. Williamson, 2009. ISBN 9781844159260
- Salerno 1943. Angus Konstam, 2007. ISBN 9781844155170
- Second Ypres 1915: The Gas Attack. John Lee, 2009. ISBN 9781844159291
- The Battle of Borodino: Napoleon Against Kutuzov. Alexander Mikaberidze, 2010. ISBN 9781848844049
- The German Offensives of 1918: The Last Desperate Gamble. Ian Passingham, 2008. ISBN 9781844156368
- The Siege of Malta 1940–42. David G Williamson, 2007. ISBN 9781844154777
- The Viking Wars of Alfred the Great. Paul Hill, 2008. ISBN 9781844157587
- Victory at Poitiers: The Black Prince and the Medieval Art of War. Christian Teutsch, 2010. ISBN 9781844159321
- War For The Throne: The Battle of Shrewsbury 1403. John Barratt, 2010. ISBN 9781848840287
