= Martyn Housden =

British historian

Martyn Housden is Emeritus Professor in Modern History at the University of Bradford. His research relates to the history of national minorities and refugees, the League of Nations, the psychoanalysis of Erich Fromm, as well as Germany and Eastern Europe. He has a particular interest in Baltic German history.

== Selected publications ==
- Migration, Dictatorship and Identity in Twentieth-Century Europe. Siegfried von Vegesack and Werner Bergengruen. Oxford: Berghahn, 2026.
- On their own behalf. Ewald Ammende, Europe's National Minorities and the Campaign for Cultural Autonomy 1920-1936. Amsterdam and New York: Rodopi, 2014.
- The League of Nations and the Organisation of Peace. London: Longman, 2012. (Seminar Studies in History)
- Forgotten Pages in Baltic History. Diversity and Inclusion. Amsterdam: Rodopi, 2011. Edited with David Smith.
- Neighbours or Enemies? Germans, the Baltic and Beyond. Amsterdam: Rodopi, 2008. (With John Hiden)
- The Holocaust. Events, Motives and Legacy. Tirril: Humanities-Ebooks. 2007.
- Hans Frank. Lebensraum and the Holocaust. Basingstoke: Palgrave, 2003. ISBN 9781403915795
- Adolf Hitler.: Study of a Revolutionary? London: Routledge, 2000.
- Resistance and Conformity in the Third Reich. London: Routledge, 1997. Reprinted 2003.
- Helmut Nicolai and Nazi Ideology. London: Macmillan, 1992.
