= Rex Pope =

British historian

Rex Pope is a British historian who was formerly head of the school of historical and critical studies at Lancashire Polytechnic. Pope is a specialist in the social and economic history of Britain in the later nineteenth and twentieth centuries. He has had two volumes published in the Seminar Studies in History series. Pope's other interests relate to the British hotel industry since 1850 and leisure hotels and tourism in the late nineteenth and early twentieth centuries.

== Selected publications ==
- Social Welfare in Britain 1885-1985. Routledge, 1986. (Editor with Alan Pratt and Bernard Hoyle) ISBN 0709940351
- Atlas of British Social and Economic History since c. 1700. Routledge, 1989. ISBN 0028973410
- War and Society in Britain 1899-1948. Longman, 1991. (Seminar Studies in History) ISBN 0582035317
- University of Central Lancashire A History of the Development of the Institution since 1828. University of Central Lancashire, 1995. ISBN 0906694531
- The British Economy since 1914: A Study in Decline? Longman, 1998. (Seminar Studies in History) ISBN 0582301947
- Unemployment and the Lancashire Weaving Area, 1920-1938. University of Central Lancashire, 2000. (Harris Papers) ISBN 1901922227
- "Unemployed Women in Inter-war Britain: the case of the Lancashire weaving district", Women's History Review, Volume 9, Number 4, 2000.
- "A Consumer Service in Interwar Britain: The Hotel Trade, 1924–1938", Business History Review, Vol. 74, Issue 04, Winter 2000, pp 657–682.
