= David G. Williamson =

British historian, writer, and lecturer

David G. Williamson is a British historian, writer, and lecturer. He is the former head of history and politics at Highgate School. Williamson specialises in the history of Germany in the nineteenth century and the first half of the twentieth century, and the military history of the Second World War. He has written two volumes in the popular Seminar Studies in History series and two in the Campaign Chronicles series.

== Selected publications ==
- Bismarck and Germany, 1862-90, Longman, 1986. (Seminar Studies in History) ISBN 0582354137
- The British in Germany 1918-1930 - The Reluctant Occupiers, (Berg, Oxford), 1991, ISBN 0-85496-584-X
- A Most Diplomatic General: Life of Lord Robertson of Oakridge, Brassey's, 1996. (Brassey's Biographies) ISBN 1857531809
- The Third Reich. Longman, 2002, (Seminar Studies in History) ISBN 9780582368835
- Germany Since 1815: A Nation Forged and Renewed, Palgrave Macmillan, 2004. ISBN 0333920945
- The Age of the Dictators: A Study of the European Dictatorships, 1918-53, Routledge, 2007. ISBN 0582505801
- The Siege of Malta 1940-1942, Pen & Sword, 2007, ISBN 1844154777
- Poland Betrayed: The Nazi-Soviet Invasions of 1939, Pen & Sword, 2009. (Campaign Chronicles) ISBN 1844159264
- The Polish Underground 1939-1947, Pen & Sword, 2012. (Campaign Chronicles) ISBN 9781848842816
