= Merrill Jensen =

American historian (1905–1980)

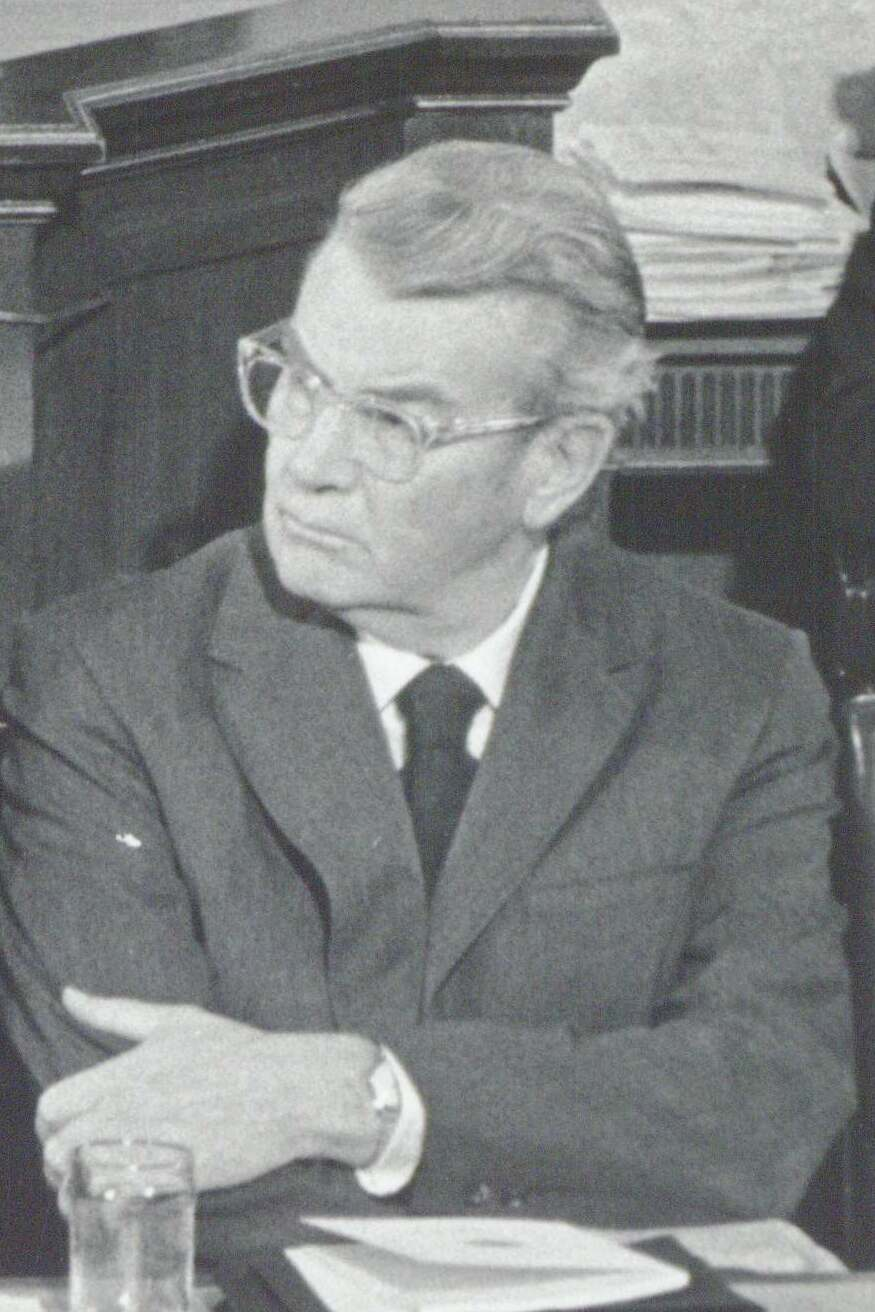
- Jensen in 1974
- Born: July 16, 1905; Elk Horn, Iowa, US
- Died: January 30, 1980 (aged 74); Madison, Wisconsin, US

Academic background
- Education: University of Washington; University of Wisconsin–Madison

Academic work
- Discipline: History
- Main interests: ratification of the United States Constitution

Merrill Monroe Jensen (July 16, 1905 – January 30, 1980) was an American historian, whose research and writing focused on the ratification of the United States Constitution. His historical interpretations are generally considered to be of the "Progressive School" of American history, the most famous exponent of which was Charles A. Beard. Jensen was a professor of history at the University of Washington (1935–1944), where he was editor of Pacific Northwest Quarterly, and the University of Wisconsin–Madison (1944–1976).

== Life ==
Born in Iowa, Jensen took a job as a teacher in a one-room schoolhouse in South Dakota upon graduating from high school. In 1929 he earned a bachelor's degree at the University of Washington. He completed a Ph.D. at the University of Wisconsin–Madison in 1934, under the guidance of William B. Hesseltine. Except for a short stint as a historian for the Army Air Corps in 1944, his career was spent at his undergraduate and graduate alma maters. He was appointed Harold Vyvyan Harmsworth Professor of American History at Oxford University in 1949–1950.

He and his wife Genevieve Margaret Privet had one daughter. He died in Madison, Wisconsin, on January 30, 1980.

== Views ==
Jensen viewed the American Revolution was "an internal revolution carried on by the masses of the people against the local aristocracy." His early scholarship challenged the "consensus" interpretation of the Constitutional ratification process, arguing that the Articles of Confederation were a better expression of genuine democratic values than was the Constitution. The replacement of the Articles with the Constitution, Jensen argued, created a system of government that minimized the influence of radical democracy rooted in local politics.

From his reading of the documentary evidence, Jensen identified deep ideological conflicts among Americans at the time of the ratification. His later scholarship focused heavily on primary documents, and he edited a number of substantial document collections, including The Documentary History of the First Federal Elections, 1788-1790 (launched in 1976 and completed in 1989 by his students Robert A. Becker and Gordon denBoer) and The Documentary History of the Ratification of the Constitution and the Bill of Rights, (launched in 1976 and as of 5 June 2018 filling 29 of a projected 31 volumes).

== Books authored ==
- The Articles of Confederation: An Interpretation of the Social-Constitutional History of the American Revolution, 1774-1781 (University of Wisconsin Press, 1940)
- The New Nation: A History of the United States during the Confederation, 1781-1789 (1950)
- The Founding of a Nation: A History of the American Revolution, 1763-1776 (Oxford University Press, 1968)
- The American Revolution within America (New York University Press, 1974) ISBN 9780814741542

== Works edited ==
- Regionalism in America (1951)
- English Historical Documents, Volume IX, American Colonial Documents to 1776 (1955)
- The Making of the American Constitution (1964)
- Tracts of the American Revolution, 1763-1776 (1967)
- The Documentary History of the First Federal Elections, Volume I, 1788-1790 (1976), edited with Robert A. Becker. ISBN 9780299066901
- The Documentary History of the Ratification of the Constitution, Vols. I-III:, edited with John P. Kaminski and Gaspare J. Saladino. ISBN 9780870201530
