= M. E. Chamberlain =

British academic historian (1932–2022)

Muriel Evelyn Chamberlain (November 1932 - 8 February 2022) was emeritus professor of history at the University of Wales, Swansea (later called Swansea University). She was a specialist in European colonisation and de-colonisation and British foreign policy in the nineteenth century. Chamberlain was one of the general editors of the Historical Association Studies book series, vice-chair of the Historical Association and editor of its journal The Historian.

In 1975 she became the first woman to reach the role of dean at the university, in 1987 was promoted to professor and in 1989 was voted into her first term as head of the history department. She retired in 1997 and continued to write books and articles. She died in 2022.

As well as her specialist interest in the British empire and Commonwealth history, she wrote the first biography of George Hamilton-Gordon, 4th Earl of Aberdeen, a politician who was Prime Minister from 1852 until 1855. She chaired the trustees of the Cambrian Archaeological Association for many years and was President of the society in 2003.

== Early life ==
Chamberlain was born in Leicester, the only daughter of Arthur Chamberlain, a railway station official, and Gladys (née Shortland), a teacher and artist. Due to her father's work, Chamberlain moved around growing up, living and going to school in Bristol, Preston, and Leeds. She graduated from St Hilda's College, Oxford. She had a stint lecturing at Royal Holloway, University of London.

== Selected publications ==
- Britain and India: The Interaction of Two Peoples. David & Charles, London, 1974. (Library of Policy & Society) ISBN 0715364065
- The Scramble for Africa. Longman, London, 1974. (Seminar Studies in History) ISBN 0582352045
- British Foreign Policy in the Age of Palmerston. Longman, London, 1980. (Seminar Studies in History) ISBN 0582352576
- The New Imperialism. The Historical Association, London, 1981.
- Lord Aberdeen: A Political Biography. Addison-Wesley, 1983. ISBN 0582504627
- Lord Palmerston. Catholic University of America Press, 1988. (Political Portraits) ISBN 0813206634
- "Pax Britannica"? British Foreign Policy 1789-1914. Longman, London, 1988. (Studies in Modern History) ISBN 058203079X
- Decolonization: The Fall of the European Empires. Blackwell, Oxford, 1985. (2nd 1999) (Historical Association Studies) ISBN 0631139354
- The Longman Companion to European Decolonization in the Twentieth Century. Longman, London, 1998. (Longman Companions to History) ISBN 0582077745
- Longman Companion to the Formation of the European Empires, 1488-1920. Routledge, London, 2014. (Longman Companions to History) ISBN 9781317878292
