= Routledge Approaches to History =

Historiography book series

'A New Type of History' Fictional proposals for dealing with the past, by Beverley Southgate, 2015.

Routledge Approaches to History is a book series on historiography published by Routledge. The first book to be published in the series was Narrative Projections of a Black British History by Eva Ulrike Pirker of the University of Freiburg.

== Titles ==
- Narrative Projections of a Black British History. Eva Ulrike Pirker, 2011. ISBN 978-0-415-89375-6
- Integrity and Historical Research. Edited by Tony Gibbons & Emily Sutherland, 2011. ISBN 978-0-415-89436-4
- Frank Ankersmit's Lost Historical Cause: A Journey from Language to Experience. Peter Icke, 2011. ISBN 978-0-415-80803-3
- Popularizing National Pasts: 1800 to the Present. Edited by Stefan Berger, Chris Lorenz & Billie Melman, 2012. ISBN 978-0-415-89435-7
- Imprisoned by History: Aspects of Historicized Life. Martin L. Davies, 2009. ISBN 978-0-415-99520-7
- History, Memory, and State-Sponsored Violence: Time and Justice. Berber Bevernage, 2011. ISBN 978-0-415-88340-5
- The Fiction of History. Edited by Alexander Lyon Macfie, 2014. ISBN 978-0-415-72301-5
- The Rise and Propagation of Historical Professionalism. Rolf Torstendahl, 2014. ISBN 978-1-13-880015-1
- Modernity, Metatheory, and the Temporal-Spatial Divide: From Mythos to Techne. Michael Kimaid, 2015. ISBN 978-1-13-883261-9
- The Material of World History. Edited by Tina Mai Chen & David S. Churchill, 2015. ISBN 978-1-13-879560-0
- The Struggle for the Long-Term in Transnational Science and Politics: Forging the Future. Edited by Jenny Andersson & Eglė Rindzevičiūtė, 2015. ISBN 978-1-13-885853-4
- 'A New Type of History' Fictional proposals for dealing with the past. Beverley Southgate, 2015. ISBN 978-1-13-884803-0
