= David C. Douglas =

British Middle Ages historian (1898–1982)

David Charles Douglas (January 5, 1898 – January 10, 1982) was a historian of the Norman period at the University of Cambridge and University of Oxford. He joined Oxford University in 1963 as Ford's Lecturer in English History, and was the 1939 winner of the James Tait Black Memorial Prize.

In 1963 he delivered the annual Ford Lectures at Oxford University on "William the Conqueror:The Norman Impact upon England". The following year his book with the same title was published by Eyre Methuen Ltd. A new edition was published by Yale University Press in 1999 as part of the Yale English Monarchs series with a new foreword by Frank Barlow. The back cover of the book states that Professor C Douglas was professor of history at the University of Bristol and founding editor of the English Monarchs series and in the Preface reproduced from the original 1964 edition Professor Douglas alludes "specially to my friends in the University of Bristol" in his thanks to those who helped him in connexion with this work.

== Works ==
- William the Conqueror: The Norman Impact Upon England (May 1964)
- The Normans
- The Norman achievement, 1050-1100, 1969
- The Norman fate, 1100-1154
- English scholars, 1660-1730 (1939) winner of the James Tait Black Memorial Prize
- English Historical Documents, v. 2. 1042-1189, (ed. with George W. Greenaway). 1st ed. 1953, 2nd ed. 1981
- The Anglo-Saxon Chronicle, edited with Dorothy Whitelock and Susie Tucker, 1961
