= Christopher Harper-Bill =

British historian

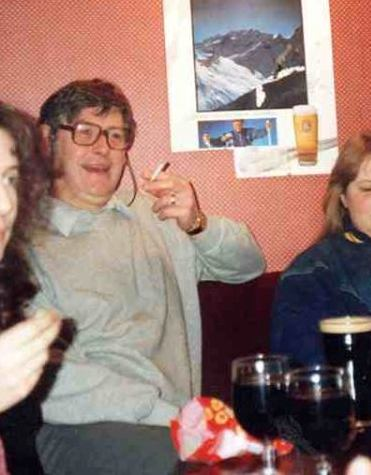
Christopher Harper Bill, St. Mary's, 1990.

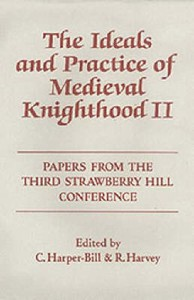
The Ideals and Practice of Medieval Knighthood, volume II, 1988.

Christopher Harper-Bill (1947 – 8 September 2018) was a British historian who was a professor of history at the University of East Anglia. He had previously taught Medieval History at St. Mary's University College (Twickenham). Harper-Bill's research interests were "the ecclesiastical history of England from the Norman Conquest to the eve of the Reformation, and particularly in the edition of episcopal and monastic records." Harper-Bill was completing a four-volume edition of the acta of the bishops of Norwich from 1070 to 1299.

Harper-Bill completed his PhD at King's College London with a dissertation titled "An edition of the Register of John Morton, Archbishop of Canterbury 1486-1500, with critical introduction" (1977). He died on 8 September 2018.

== Selected publications ==
- Pre-Reformation Church in England, 1400-1530. Longman, 1989. ISBN 0582355559 (Seminar Studies in History)
- The Ideals and Practice of Medieval Knighthood I: Papers from the First and Second Strawberry Hill Conferences. Boydell and Brewer, 1986. (Editor with Ruth Harvey) ISBN 9780851154428
- The Ideals and Practice of Medieval Knighthood II: Papers from the Third Strawberry Hill Conference. Boydell and Brewer, 1988. (Editor with Ruth Harvey) ISBN 9780851154930
- The Ideals and Practice of Medieval Knighthood III: Papers from the Fourth Strawberry Hill Conference. Boydell and Brewer, 1990. (Editor with Ruth Harvey) ISBN 9780851152653
- English Episcopal Acta 6: Norwich 1070-1214, Oxford University Press for British Academy, 1990. ISBN 0197260918
- Studies in the History of Medieval Religion: 3, Religious Belief and Ecclesiastical Careers in Late Medieval England: Proceedings of the conference held at Strawberry Hill, Easter 1989, Boydell & Brewer, 1991, (Editor) ISBN 9780851152967
- The Anglo-Norman Church, Headstart History Papers, 1992, ISBN 9781873041901
- Ideals and Practice of Medieval Knighthood IV: Papers from the Fifth Strawberry Hill Conference. Boydell and Brewer, 1992. (Editor with Ruth Harvey) ISBN 9780851153193
- Studies in the History of Medieval Religion: 7, Medieval Ecclesiastical Studies in Honour of Dorothy M. Owen, Boydell & Brewer, 1995, (Editor with M.J. Franklin) ISBN 9780851153841
- Pre-Reformation Church in England, 1400-1530. 2nd Edition, Routledge, 1996. ISBN 0582355559 (Seminar Studies in History)
- Anglo-Norman Studies XIX: Proceedings of the Battle Conference 1996, Boydell & Brewer, 1997, (Editor) ISBN 9780851157078
- English Episcopal Acta 21: Norwich 1215-1243. Oxford University Press for British Academy, 2001. (Editor) ISBN 9780197262122
- East Anglia's History: Studies in Honour of Norman Scarfe. Boydell and Brewer, 2002. (Editor with Carole Rawcliffe and Richard G. Wilson ISBN 0851158781
- Medieval East Anglia. The Boydell Press, 2005, (Editor) ISBN 1843831511
- A Companion to the Anglo-Norman World. Boydell and Brewer, 2007. (Editor with Elisabeth van Houts) ISBN 0851156738
- Henry II: New Interpretations. Boydell and Brewer, 2007. (Editor with Nicholas Vincent, N) ISBN 9781843833406
- English Episcopal Acta 32: Norwich 1244-1266. Oxford University Press for British Academy, 2007. (Editor) ISBN 9780197264171
- English Episcopal Acta 40: Norwich 1266-1288. Oxford University Press for British Academy, 2012. (Editor) ISBN 9780197265161
- English Episcopal Acta 41: Norwich 1289-1299. Oxford University Press for British Academy, 2012. (Editor) ISBN 9780197265178

== See also ==
- Suffolk Records Society
