= English Historical Documents =

Book series

English Historical Documents (EHD) is a series of publications of source material on English history by the academic publisher Eyre and Spottiswoode, now part of Oxford University Press. Some later volumes were published by Routledge. The original general editor was David C. Douglas, professor of history at the University of Bristol. Publication began in 1953. Each volume ran to around 1000 pages, and was edited by one or more major academic authorities in the period covered; some volumes are now in their second edition. WorldCat shows them present in virtually all academic libraries, both large and small. Sources published in other languages (French, Anglo-Saxon, Old Norse, Latin) are given in English translation.

The volumes have been widely reviewed, and are considered as a basic standard resource. Each chronological volume consists of a general introduction to the history and the historical sources for the period, an extensive bibliography, and sections (the details varying with the period) on narrative sources such as chronicles and newspapers, legal documents and legislation, economic sources, literary sources, and appendices of maps and genealogies. Many volumes contain illustrations.

The series contains:

- volume 1: c.500–1042, edited by Dorothy Whitelock. 1st ed. 1955, 2nd ed. 1979, 952pp.; e-book, 1996
- volume 2: 1042–1189, edited by David C. Douglas and George W. Greenaway. 1st ed. 1953, 2nd ed. 1981, 1083pp.
- volume 3: 1189–1327, edited by Harry Rothwell. 1975, 1032pp. ISBN 978-0-413-23300-4
- volume 4: 1327–1485, edited by Alec R. Myers. 1969, 1236pp. ISBN 978-0-413-23310-3
- volume 5: 1485–1558, edited by C. H. Williams. 1967, 1082pp.; OCLC 247046009
- volume 6: 1558–1603, edited by Ian Archer & Douglas Prince. 2011, 1392pp.; ISBN 978-0-415-35097-6
- volume 7: 1603–1660, edited by Barry Coward & Peter Gaunt. 2010, 1408pp.; ISBN 978-0-415-19909-4
- volume 8: 1660–1714, edited by Andrew Browning. 1953, 996pp. ISBN 978-0-203-19579-6
- volume 9: American colonial documents, to 1776, edited by Merrill Jensen. 1955, 888pp. OCLC 9802673
- volume 10: 1714–1783, edited by D. B. Horn and Mary Ransome. 1957, 972pp. OCLC 247046807
- volume 11: 1783–1832, edited by A. Aspinall and E. Anthony Smith. 1959, 992pp. ISBN 978-0-203-19915-2
- volume 12, pt. 1: 1833–1874, edited by George M. Young and W. D. Handcock. 1956, 1017pp. OCLC 33037858
- volume 12, pt. 2: 1874–1914, edited W. D. Handcock. 1977, 725pp. ISBN 978-0-415-14375-2

They are electronically available in various formats, including MyiLibrary, Kindle, and NetLibrary. The volume numbering on the later volumes vary, to take account of the two volumes (1558–1603 and 1603–1660) not originally published. A volume of selections, English Historical Documents, 1815–1870, in 120 pages, was published by Methuen Publishing in 1964, OCLC 62887069.
