= Andrew Browning =

Scottish historian

Andrew Browning, FBA (28 March 1889 – 8 May 1972) was a Scottish historian. He was Professor of History at the University of Glasgow from 1931 to 1957.

== Early life and education ==
Born in Dennistoun in Glasgow on 28 March 1889, Browning was the son of Daniel Browning, JP, the managing director of a picture frame manufacturing firm and the Liberal candidate for a Glasgow parliamentary constituency in the 1918 general election. Daniel Browning was a book collector, with over 4,000 volumes in his library. Among Andrew Browning's siblings was Robert, a journalist, and David, a lexicographer.

Browning attended Whitehill School, before reading history at the University of Glasgow from 1907. He was taught by Dudley Julius Medley (the Professor of History), K. K. M. Leys, E. S. Lyttel and W. S. McKechnie. Browning was the top-ranking history student in his year at Glasgow and graduated with a first-class degree in 1911. He spent a year as an assistant to Medley and then entered Balliol College, Oxford, in 1912 with a scholarship in history; initially studying medieval history for the BLitt, he was then asked by the college to sit the history finals instead and graduated with a first in 1914. He had already won the Stanhope Prize the previous year for an essay on the 17th-century politician Thomas Osborne, 1st Duke of Leeds. While at Balliol, he struck up friendships with V. H. Galbraith and Harold Laski, and studied under H. W. C. Davis and A. L. Smith.

== Career ==
Browning was appointed an assistant to Medley at Glasgow in 1914. Poor eyesight initially left him ineligible to fight in the First World War, so he covered for an absent lecturer in the history department and contributed to the Glasgow Herald. He was finally allowed to train as a gunner in 1917 and served in the Army until 1919. He returned to Glasgow and once again covered for absent staff by lecturing across the curriculum. Browning's interests turned towards early modern England. So, as well as publishing Britain as a European Power in 1922, he authored The Age of Elizabeth in 1928. He also began work on a biography of the Duke of Leeds; he presented his work in manuscript form for assessment for the DLitt at Glasgow, which was awarded in 1930. The following year, he succeeded Medley as Professor of History, in which office he served until resigning in 1957.

In the meantime, Browning edited the Memoirs of Sir John Reresby with a selection of letters, which was published in 1936. Publication of his biography of Osborne's biography was delayed until 1944, when Browning published his letters as volume 2 of the biography, and then in two further volumes in 1951 (volume 1 being the biography itself and volume 3 the appendices). He also edited volume 8 of English Historical Documents covering the period 1660 to 1714. Spanning over 1,000 pages, it was printed in 1953. During the Second World War, he had published a short book British Political Institutions (1943) and had earlier authored Modern Europe, 1648–1714 with D. B. Horn (1931) as well as several articles. But it was his biography of Osborne, his edition of Reresby's Memoirs and his contribution to the English Historical Documents series which established his reputation. In 1955, he was elected a fellow of the British Academy. He wrote little in his retirement, save an article on the historian Macauley. He died on 8 May 1972, leaving a library of 12,000 books to the University of Stirling, his copyright to the Royal Historical Society, and his papers to C. D. Chandaman (which were mostly transferred to the archives of the University of Glasgow).
