= David Englander =

British historian (1949-1999)

David Englander (3 June 1949 – 7 April 1999) was a British historian of labour and poverty, and of soldiers in the World Wars, and was an authority on the work of Charles Booth and Jewish immigration to Britain.

== Early life ==
David Englander was born in Whitechapel, London, on 3 June 1949, the son of a cabinet-maker. He was not successful at school until he came under the influence of inspiring teachers who encouraged him to apply for university. He graduated from Warwick University in 1970 in history and politics, where he was influenced by the communist historian E.P. Thompson.

== Career ==
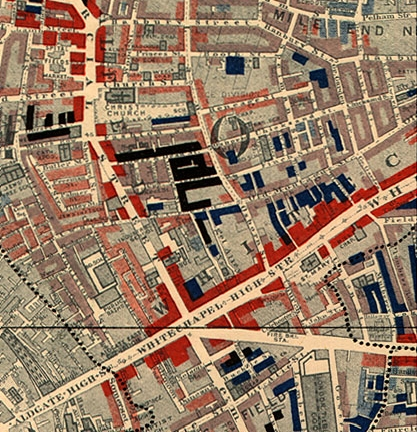
Extract from Charles Booth's map of Whitechapel, 1889. The red areas are "well-to-do"; the black areas are "semi-criminal".

Englander studied at University of London's Institute of Education and subsequently taught history at Dame Alice Owen's School. In 1972, he returned to Warwick University where he completed his MA and PhD. In 1976, he was a junior research fellow at Corpus Christi College, Oxford. He joined the history department of the Open University in 1979 where he spent the rest of his career.

Englander was an authority on the work of the social researcher and reformer Charles Booth, and set up the Charles Booth Centre for the History of Social Investigation at the Open University. He and Rosemary O’Day created a CD-ROM database of the Booth Poverty Notebooks, and an innovative undergraduate course on Booth's work (which included another CD-ROM).

== Family ==
Englander married fellow historian Rosemary O'Day, and acquired a step son. The couple had two sons together and the couple co-wrote a monograph on Charles Booth and co-edited a book on social investigation.

== Death ==
Englander died on 7 April 1999. He had been suffering from cancer. A conference on "The History of Social Investigation" was held at the Open University in 2005 in his memory.

== Selected publications ==
- Knee, Fred. The diary of Fred Knee. Society for the Study of Labour History, Manchester, 1977. (Editor)
- Landlord and tenant in urban Britain 1838–1918. Clarendon Press, Oxford, 1983. ISBN 0198226802
- The British soldier in World War II. Centre for the Study of Social History, Coventry, c. 1984. (With Tony Mason)
- Culture and belief in Europe 1450–1600: An anthology of sources. Basil Blackwell, Oxford, 1990. (joint editor)
- The Jewish enigma: An enduring people. Open University in association with Peter Halban, Milton Keynes, 1992. ISBN 1870015444 (Editor)
- Mr. Charles Booth's Inquiry: Life and Labour of the People in London Reconsidered. Hambledon Press, 1993. ISBN 1852850795 (With Rosemary O'Day)
- A Documentary history of Jewish immigrants in Britain, 1840–1920. Leicester University Press, Leicester, 1994. (Editor and compiler)
- Retrieved riches: Social investigation in Britain, 1840–1914. Scolar Press, Aldershot, 1995. (Edited with Rosemary O'Day)
- Britain and America: Studies in Comparative History, 1760–1970. Yale University Press, 1997. (Editor)
- Poverty and Poor Law Reform in Nineteenth-Century Britain, 1834–1914: From Chadwick to Booth. Longman, London, 1998. (Seminar Studies in History)
