= Barry Coward =

British historian (1941–2011)

Barry Coward (22 February 1941 – 17 March 2011) was a professor of history at Birkbeck College, University of London, and an expert on the Stuart age.

== Life ==
Coward was born on 22 February 1941 in Rochdale, Greater Manchester, where he attended the local grammar school. He graduated with a degree in history from the University of Sheffield, where he met his future wife and completed his doctorate under Robin Jeffs. In 1966, he was awarded a PhD in history. In the same year, he was appointed as a lecturer at Birkbeck, where he remained for 40 years until his retirement in 2006.

During his career, Coward also held the positions of Head of Department and Dean of Art. He was also president of the London Historical Association from 1995, and was president of the Cromwell Association from 1999 to 2009.

He died of cancer on March 17, 2011.

== Political views ==
He was a supporter of the Labour Party and its core values.

== Private life ==
Coward married his wife, Shirley, in 1967, with whom he had three children – sons Anthony and Nick and daughter Lynna.

== Selected publications ==
- The Stuart Age. 1980.
- The Stanleys, Lords Stanley and Earls of Derby 1385–1672: The Origins, Wealth and Power of a Landowning Family. (1983).
- Social Change and Continuity in Early Modern England, 1550–1750. Longman, 1988. (Seminar Studies in History) ISBN 0582354536
- Oliver Cromwell. (1991)
- The Cromwellian Protectorate. 2002.
- As editor: A Companion to Stuart Britain (2003)
- English Historical Documents Volume 7: 1603–1660 (co-editor with Peter Gaunt; 2010)
