= Alison Rempel Brown =

American nonprofit executive

Alison Rempel Brown (born c. 1958) is an American nonprofit executive. She is the president of the Science Museum of Minnesota, a role she began in May 2016. She was previously the chief of staff at the California Academy of Sciences.
