= Gordon Martel =

Military history professor

Gordon Martel is emeritus professor of history at the University of Northern British Columbia and adjunct professor at the University of Victoria. Martel is a specialist in the history of modern warfare and edited The Encyclopedia of War (2012). Martel was one of the founding editors of The International History Review, and is co-editor of the book series Seminar Studies in History and editor of the series Short Histories of Big Ideas.

In 2006, Martel revised and expanded James Joll's The Origins of the First World War.

== Selected publications ==
=== 1980s ===
- Imperial Diplomacy: Rosebery and the Failure of Foreign Policy. Mansell Publishing, 1986. ISBN 0720117348
- The Origins of the First World War. Longman, 1987. (Seminar Studies In History) ISBN 0582223822

=== 1990s ===
- Modern Germany Reconsidered: 1870-1945. Routledge, 1992. (Editor)
- American Foreign Relations Reconsidered: 1890-1993. Routledge, 1994. (Editor)
- Origins of the Second World War Reconsidered: A.J.P. Taylor and the Historians. Routledge, 1999. (Editor)

=== 2000s ===
- The Times and Appeasement: The Journals of A. L. Kennedy, 1932-1939. Cambridge University Press, 2001. (Camden Fifth Series) ISBN 0521793548
- The World War Two Reader. Routledge, 2004. (Editor) (Routledge Readers in History) ISBN 0415224020
- A Companion to Europe 1900-1945. Wiley-Blackwell, 2005. (Editor) (Blackwell Companions to European History) ISBN 1405106646
- The Origins of the First World War. Routledge, 2006. (With James Joll) (Origins Of Modern Wars) ISBN 0582423791
- A Companion to International History 1900-2001. Wiley-Blackwell, 2007. (Editor) (Blackwell Companions to History) ISBN 1405125748
- The Encyclopedia of War. Wiley-Blackwell, 2012. (Editor) ISBN 978-1-4051-9037-4
- The Month that Changed the World: July 1914. 2014. ISBN 978-0-19-966538-9
- Twentieth-Century War and Conflict: A Concise Encyclopedia. Wiley-Blackwell, 2014. (Editor)
