= Rosemary O'Day =

Rosemary O'Day (born 29 May 1945) is professor emeritus of history at the Open University. She was co-director of the Charles Booth Centre and is currently a consultant to the Charles Booth Archive Online project at the University of London.

== Early life ==
O'Day was educated at the Orme Girls' School now Newcastle-under-Lyme School in Staffordshire, the University of York, and at King's College, University of London. O’Day held the Eileen Power Studentship at London School of Economics.

== Career ==
O'Day was a lecturer at the University of Birmingham and joined the Open University in 1975, of which she is now professor emeritus in history. She was co-director of the Charles Booth Centre and is currently a consultant to the Charles Booth Archive Online project at the University of London.

== Family ==
O'Day was the youngest child of Rev. Thomas Henry Brookes who held livings in Staffordshire. O'Day was married to fellow historian David Englander (died 1999). The couple had two sons together and co-edited several books. O'Day has three sons in all. O'Day was married previously to historian Dr. Alan O'Day (died 11 May 2017) and later divorced. They had one son.

== Selected publications ==
- Economy and Community: economic and social history of preindustrial England, 1500–1700, A. & C. Black, 1975.
- Continuity and Change: personnel and administration of the Church of England 1500–1642, 1976. [with Felicity Heal]
- Church and Society in England, Henry VIII to James I, 1977. [with Felicity Heal]
- The English Clergy: emergence and consolidation of a profession, 1558–1642, Leicester University Press, 1979.
- Princes and Paupers in the English Church, 1500-1800, 1981. [with Felicity Heal]
- Education and Society 1500–1800: the social foundations of education in early modern Britain, Longmans, 1982.
- The Debate on the English Reformation, Methuen, 1986.
- Mr Charles Booth's Inquiry: life and labour of the people in London reconsidered, Hambledon, 1993. [with her husband Dr. David Englander]
- Family and Family Relationships, 1500–1900: England, France and the United States of America, Macmillan, 1994.
- Retrieved Riches: The History of Social Investigation in Britain, Scolar Press, 1995. [again with Dr. David Englander]
- Longman Companion to the Tudor age, Longman, 1995.
- The Professions in Early Modern England: Servants of the Commonweal, Longman, 2000.
- France, England and Burgundy in the fifteenth century (Block 1: A200 Exploring History), The Open University, 2007. [with Kathleen Daly]
- Women's Agency in Early Modern Britain and the American Colonies, Longman, 2007.
- Cassandra Brydges (1670–1735) First Duchess of Chandos: Life and Letters, Boydell and Brewer, 2007.
- London Labour and the London poor, Wordsworth Editions (with an introduction by Rosemary O'Day and David Englander), 2008.
- "Family Galleries: Women and Art in the Seventeenth and Eighteenth Centuries", Huntington Library Quarterly, Autumn 2008.
- The Routledge Companion to the Tudor Age, Routledge, 2009.
- "Matchmaking and moneymaking in a patronage society: the first duke and duchess of Chandos c.1712-35", Economic History Review, 2012.
- An Elite Family in Early Modern England, Boydell & Brewer, 2018
