= Douglas Peers =

Canadian historian

Douglas M. Peers FRHS is a Canadian historian who specializes in the history of the British Empire. He is a fellow of the Royal Historical Society since 1993 and Dean of Arts at the University of Waterloo, 2011-2018.

== Selected publications ==
=== Edited ===
- Warfare and Empire. An Expanding World: the European Impact on World History, 1450-1800 series. Johns Hopkins, Baltimore, and Variorum, London, 1997.
- J.S. Mill’s Encounter with India. University of Toronto Press, Toronto, 1999. (With Martin Moir and Lynn Zastoupil)
- Negotiating India in the Nineteenth Century Media. Macmillan, London, 2000. (With David Finkelstein)
- India and the British Empire. The Oxford History of the British Empire Companion Series. Oxford University Press, Oxford, 2012. (With Nandini Gooptu)

=== Authored ===
- Between Mars and Mammon: Colonial Armies and the Garrison State in India, 1819-1835. I.B. Tauris, London, 1995.
- India under Colonial Rule: 1700-1885. Longman, London, 2006.
