= Howard Shaw (author) =

Cyril Raymond Howard Shaw (born September 1934) is a British teacher and writer, specialising in crime fiction. He is a former head of history at Harrow School.

== Life and career ==
Shaw was born in Bristol in September 1934, and educated at Taunton School and at Queen's College, Oxford, where he read modern history. He was commissioned in the Royal Artillery during his national service after which he taught at Harrow School from 1961 to 1997. In 1966, Shaw was elected a schoolmaster fellow of Emmanuel College, Cambridge.

In 1968, Shaw produced The Levellers in the Seminar Studies in History series. He has subsequently written a number of well-received works of mystery fiction, published initially under the pseudonym "Colin Howard", drawing on his knowledge of the English public school and the Oxford University college. Death of a Don (1982) was a Mystery Guild selection, and was later re-published in the U.K. in the Black Dagger Crime series. Of the book, Christopher Wordsworth commented "Cambridge may incubate the best traitors but Oxford can pride itself on fiction's best corpses".

== Selected publications ==
- The Levellers. Longman, London, 1968. (Seminar Studies in History) ISBN 0582313872
- Killing No Murder. Scribner, New York, 1981. ISBN 0684168847
- Death of a Don. Hodder & Stoughton, London, 1982. ISBN 0340276436
- Thomas Hardy: An Autobiography in Verse. Shepheard-Walwyn, 1984. (With Eliane Wilson) ISBN 0856830739
- Pageant of Death. Offa Press, Harrow on the Hill, 2000. ISBN 095395210X
- Betrayal in Burgundy. Matador, Leicester, 2013. ISBN 9781780884882
