= Alison Brown (computer scientist) =

Alison A. Brown is a computer scientist who is known for her contributions to academic computer science.

== Work ==
In the mid-1970s, Alison Brown led and contributed to numerous initiatives for Cornell's Office of Computer Services, including microcomputers and personal computers. In 1988, Brown left Cornell to become the associate director of the Ohio Supercomputer Center. She also served as the director of the Ohio Academic Resources Network (OARnet) from 1988 to 1994.

== Personal life ==
She was married to Kenneth Wilson, the 1982 Physics Nobel Prize winner.
