= Roger Lockyer =

English historian, academic, and writer

Roger Lockyer (27 November 1927 – 28 October 2017) was an English historian, academic, and writer. He had been educated at Pembroke College, Cambridge. He was a reader in history at Royal Holloway, University of London for many years, specialising in research and writing on the Tudor (1471-1603) and Stuart (1603-1714) periods.

== Major works ==
- Tudor and Stuart Britain, 3rd edition, (London 2004, Pearson). online

The first edition of this book, covering the period from 1471 to 1714, was published in 1964, and a second edition appeared in 1985. This work is considered a standard reference for this period in English history, covering the full range of Tudor and Stuart rulers.

- Henry VII, 3rd edition, (London 1997, Routledge); revised by Andrew Thrush.

The first edition of this book was published in 1968, for the Seminar Studies in History series. A second edition appeared in 1983, and the third edition was republished after revisions to the text by Andrew Thrush.

- Habsburg and Bourbon Europe, 1470-1720, (London 1974, Longman).
- Buckingham: The Life and Political Career of George Villiers, First Duke of Buckingham, 1592-1628, (London 1981, Longman).

George Villiers was a favourite of King James I.

- The Early Stuarts: The Political History of England 1603-1642, 2nd edition, (London 1999, Longman).

The first edition of this book was published in 1989.

- James VI and I, by Roger Lockyer, 2nd edition, (London 1998, Longman).

James I was the first Stuart King of England.

== Personal life ==
On 21 December 2005, Lockyer entered into a civil partnership with Percy Stevens, his life partner of 39 years, at the registry office in Westminster, London. On 26 June 2014 they were among the first couples to legally convert their civil partnership into a marriage.

He died on 28 October 2017 at the age of 89.
