= Access to History =

British book series

The Later Stuarts and the Glorious Revolution, Oliver Bullock, 2020.

Access to History is a British book series designed for pre-university study. The series was conceived and developed by Keith Randell (1943-2002), who wanted to produce books for students "as they are, not as we might wish them to be". The series is published by Hodder Education, and features titles relevant for all of the major awarding bodies, including AQA, Pearson Edexcel, OCR and WJEC.

== Incomplete list of titles ==
Organised by date of first publication:

- Keith Randell. Luther and the German Reformation, 1517-1555 (1986 & 1989). (2nd ed. 2000); revised with Russel Tarr (3rd ed. 2008); re-titled Luther and the Reformation in Europe, 1500-1564 (4th ed. 2015) ISBN 1471838536
- Andrina Stiles. The Unification of Italy, 1815-1870 (1986 & 1989). (2nd ed. 2001); revised with Robert Pearce (3rd ed. 2006); re-titled The Unification of Italy, 1789-1896 (4th ed. 2015) ISBN 1471838595
- Adrina Stiles. The Unification of Germany 1815-1890 (1986 & 1989); revised with Alan Farmer (2nd ed. 2001); re-titled The Unification of Germany 1815-1919 (3rd ed. 2007) ISBN 0340929294
- Keith Randell. France, 1814-1870: Monarchy Republic and Empire (1986 & 1991). ISBN 0340518057
- Keith Randell. France: The Third Republic, 1870-1914 (1986 & 1991). ISBN 0340555696
- Duncan Townson. France in Revolution, 1774-1815 (1990); revised with Dylan Rees (2nd ed. 2001, 3rd ed. 2005, 4th ed. 2008, 5th ed. 6th ed. 2019) ISBN 1510457844
- Keith Randell. Henry VIII and the Government of England (1991). (2nd ed. 2001) ISBN 0340782161
- Keith Randell. Henry VIII and the Reformation in England (1992). (2nd ed. 2001) ISBN 0340782153
- Mark Robson. Italy: Liberalism and Fascism, 1870-1945 (1992). (2nd ed. 2000); re-titled Italy: The Rise of Fascism 1915-1945 (3rd ed. 2006); re-titled Italy: The Rise of Fascism 1896-1946 (4th ed. 2015, 5th ed. 2019) ISBN 1510457860
- Geoff Layton. Germany: The Third Reich 1933-1945 (1992). (2nd ed. 2000) ISBN 0340725338
- Andrina Stiles. Sweden and the Baltic, 1523-1721 (1992). ISBN 0340546441
- Michael Lynch. Reaction and Revolution: Russia 1881-1924 (1992). (2nd ed. 2000); re-titled Reaction and Revolution: Russia 1894-1924 (3rd ed. 2005, 4th ed. 2015) ISBN 1471838560
- Stewart MacDonald. Charles V: Ruler, Dynast and Defender of the Faith, 1500-1558 (1992). (2nd ed. 2000) ISBN 0340749229
- Andrina Stiles. Napoleon, France and Europe (1993). (2nd ed. 2004); revised with Dylan Rees (3rd ed. 2009) ISBN 034098676X
- John Warren. Elizabeth I: Religion and Foreign Affairs (1993). (2nd ed. 2002); re-titled Elizabeth I: Meeting the Challenge, England 1541-1603 (3rd ed. 2008) ISBN 0340965932
- Keith Randell. Elizabeth I and the Government of England (1994). ISBN 0340565470
- Michael Lynch. The Interregnum, 1649-1660 (1994). ISBN 0340582073
- Duncan Watts. Tories, Conservatives and Unionists 1815-1914 (1994). ISBN 0340600810
- Robert Pearce & Roger Stearn. Government and Reform: Britain 1815-1918 (1994). (2nd ed. 2000) ISBN 0340789476
- Michael Lynch. China: From Empire to People's Republic 1900-1949 (1996). (2nd ed. 2010) ISBN 1444110128
- Peter Clements. Prosperity, Depression and the New Deal: The USA 1890-1954 (1997). (2nd ed. 2001, 3rd ed. 2005, 4th ed. 2008) ISBN 0340965886
- Oliver Edwards. The USA and the Cold War, 1945-1963 (1997). (2nd ed. 2002) ISBN 0340846879
- Michael Lynch. The People's Republic Of China since 1949 (1998); re-titled The People's Republic of China, 1949-1976 (2nd ed. 2008) ISBN 0340929278
- Phil Chapple. The Industrialisation of Britain, 1780-1914 (1999). ISBN 0340720697
- Michael Lynch. Britain, 1900-1951 (2008); re-titled Britain, 1900-1957 (2nd ed. 2015). ISBN 1471838692
- Michael Lynch. Britain, 1945-2007 (2008). (2nd ed. 2015); re-titled Britain, 1951-2007 (3rd ed. 2019). ISBN 1510457917
- Geoff Layton. From Second Reich to Third Reich Germany 1918-1945 - for Edexcel (2008). ISBN 0340965819
- Michael Scott-Baumann. Crisis in the Middle East: Israel and the Arab States 1945-2007 (2009). ISBN 0340966580
- Angela Leonard & Nigel Bushnell. Germany Divided and Reunited 1945-1991 (2009). ISBN 0340986751
- Katherine Brice & Michael Lynch. The Early Stuarts and the English Revolution 1603-1660 (2015). (2nd ed. 2021) ISBN 1510459782
- Oliver Bullock. The Later Stuarts and the Glorious Revolution 1660-1702 (2020). ISBN 151045912X

== See also ==
- Seminar Studies in History
