= Science Museum of Minnesota =

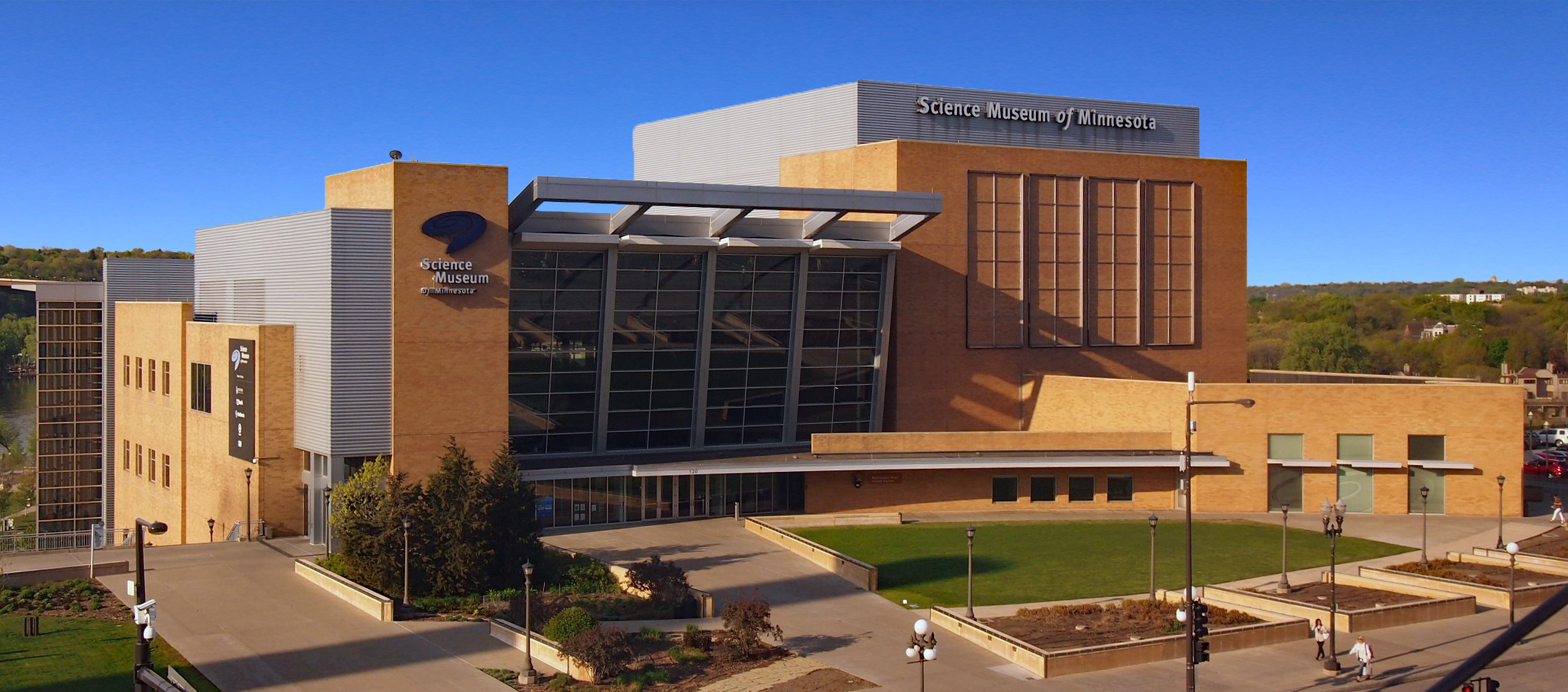

- Location within Minnesota
- Established: 1907
- Location: 120 W. Kellogg Boulevard, Saint Paul, Minnesota, United States
- Coordinates: 44°56′33″N 93°5′55″W
- Type: Science museum
- President: Alison Rempel Brown
- Website: www.smm.org

The Science Museum of Minnesota is a museum in Saint Paul, Minnesota, focused on topics in technology, natural history, physical science, and mathematics education. Founded in 1907, the 501(c)(3) nonprofit institution has 385 employees and is supported by volunteers.

== History ==
A group of businessmen led by Charles W. Ames established the museum in 1906 with the aim to promote intellectual and scientific growth in St. Paul. It was initially housed at the St. Paul Auditorium on Fourth Street and was then called the St. Paul Institute of Science and Letters. In 1909, it briefly merged with the St. Paul School of Fine Arts (now the Minnesota Museum of American Art).

In 1927, the museum relocated to Merriam Mansion on Capitol Hill, the former home of Colonel John L. Merriam. This location had increased exhibit storage space. The museum outgrew the facilities and moved to the St. Paul-Ramsey Arts and Sciences Center at 30 East Tenth Street in 1964. In 1978, the museum expanded into a new space on Wabasha Street between 10th and Exchange Streets via a skyway connection, which allowed for exhibit space and the addition of an IMAX Dome (OMNIMAX) cinema.

In the early 1990s, plans for a new facility, adjacent to the Mississippi River, were formed with architecture firm Ellerbe Becket. With aid from public funding initiatives, the new museum broke ground on May 1, 1997, and opened on December 11, 1999. During the move, 1.75 million artifacts were transported.

In the early 2000s, the museum hosted several exhibits, including BODY WORLDS; Tutankhamun: The Golden King and the Great Pharaohs; Star Wars: Where Science Meets Imagination; Real Pirates: The Untold Story of the Whydah from Slave Ship to Pirate Ship; and The Science Behind Pixar. It also added several films to its production roster, including Jane Goodall’s Wild Chimpanzees; Tornado Alley; National Parks Adventure; and Ancient Caves, and it built its exhibit production portfolio with exhibits like Robots + Us; A Day in Pompeii; RACE: Are We So Different?; Maya: Hidden Worlds Revealed; SPACE: An Out of Gravity Experience; and Sportsology. The museum continues to provide exhibit development, design, and production services for other museums.

== Resident exhibits ==
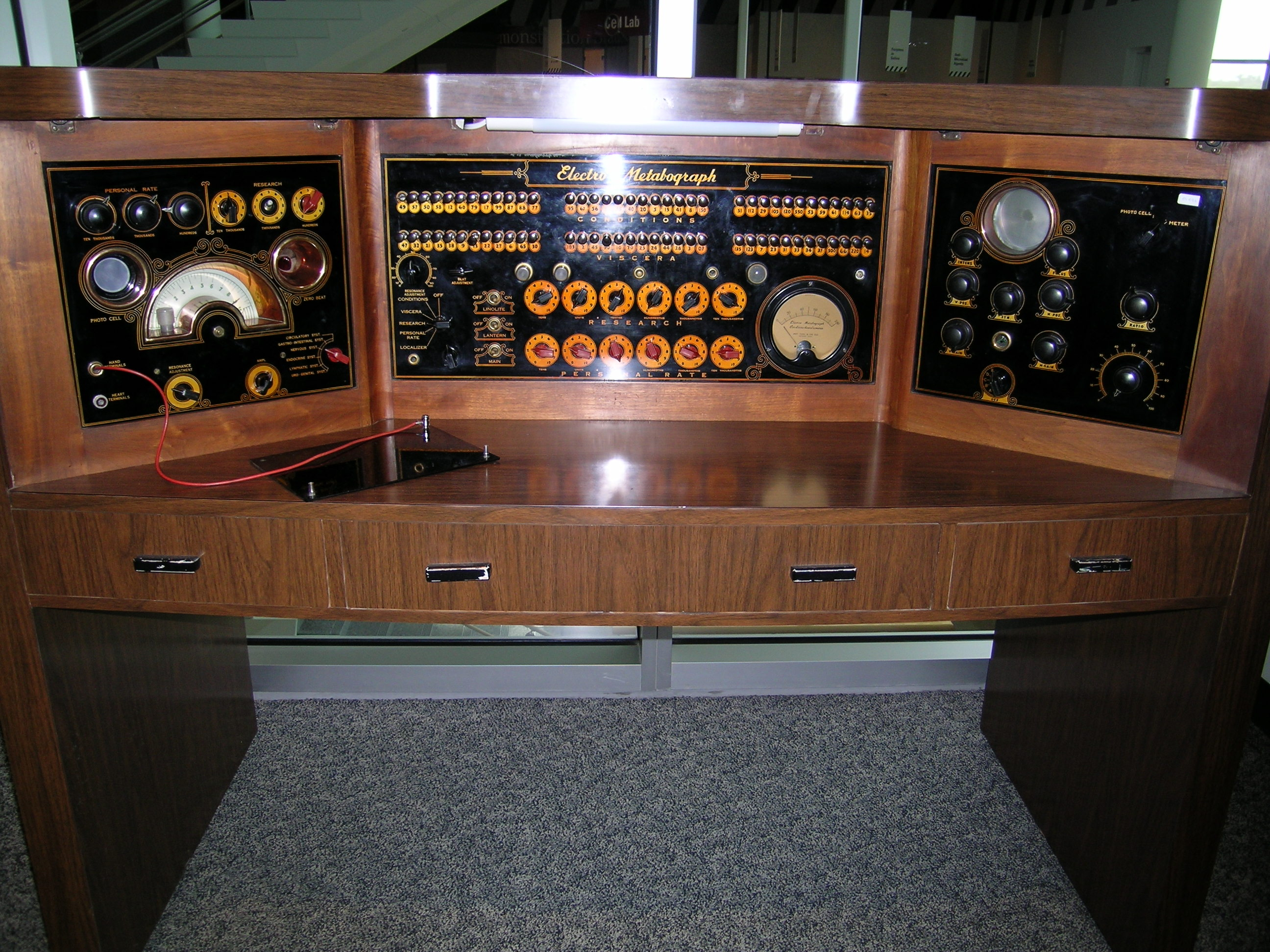
The "electro-meta graph machine" on display in the Quackery Hall of Fame

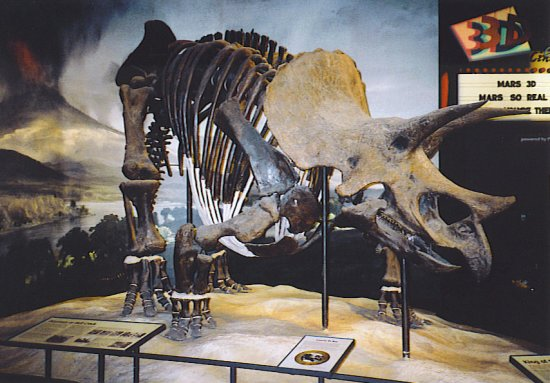
The Triceratops, a composite mount of two animals nicknamed "Fafnir"

Offerings change frequently, but several exhibits are always on display:

- The Dinosaurs & Fossils Gallery showcases several original and replicated dinosaur skeletons, as well as many complete and preserved animals. Some highlights from the Mesozoic Era include a Triceratops, Diplodocus, Allosaurus, Stegosaurus, and Camptosaurus, while those from the Cenozoic include a giant terror bird, an armored glyptodont, the giant seabird Pelagornis sandersi, a hyaenodont, and fossil crocodilians of the era, especially champsosaurs from the 60-million-year-old Wannagan Creek site in North Dakota the museum works at. The gallery also features two sculpted, 17-foot-tall Quetzalcoatluses, giant flying reptiles from the late Cretaceous that were known for their long beaks and broad, bat-like wings.
- The Human Body Gallery shows visitors the various tissues, organs, and systems (such as blood or digestion) that make up the human body. A mummy is on display. Weighing the Evidence is an experience that helps visitors separate fact from fiction in healthcare decisions, featuring artifacts from the former Museum of Questionable Medical Devices. The museum acquired these pieces in 2002 when its original owner Bob McCoy, son of Wilson McCoy, retired and donated the collection.
- The Experiment Gallery allows visitors to explore concepts in physics, math, and physical and earth science with interactive displays.
- Sportsology, a study of the body in motion, gives visitors a better idea of what it takes to make a basket, swing a racket, or score a goal.
- RACE: Are We So Different? is the first national exhibition to tell the stories of race from biological, cultural, and historical points of view.
- We Move & We Stay features artifacts and historical content about the Dakota and Ojibwe people.
- The Mississippi River Gallery takes advantage of the museum's proximity to the river and a National Park to educate visitors about its natural resources. Visitors can learn about the river's environment and animals. It is also home to The Collectors' Corner. Traders (mainly children) bring in natural artifacts they find to trade them for points or other artifacts.

== Facilities ==
=== Omnitheater ===
The Mississippi riverfront facility has a convertible dome IMAX theater. With both a wall screen for IMAX films and other flat-screen presentations and a rotating dome for viewing IMAX dome presentations, it was the first convertible theater in the northern hemisphere. The counterweights for the system were so massive that they had to be put in place before the rest of the building. When it opened in 1999, the theater boasted "the largest permanently installed electronic cinema projector in the world", an advanced computer system to coordinate the theater's facilities, and a complex sound system to accommodate both viewing formats.

In summer 2019, the Omnitheater briefly closed to convert to digital laser technology. In October 2019, it reopened as the world's third-largest digital laser IMAX dome theater.

The museum is a leading producer of giant screen films, including:

- Genesis (1978)
- Living Planet (1979)
- The Great Barrier Reef (1981)
- Darwin on the Galapagos (1983)
- Seasons (1987)
- Ring of Fire (1991)
- Tropical Rainforest (1992)
- Search for the Great Sharks (1995)
- The Greatest Places (1998)
- Jane Goodall's Wild Chimpanzees (2002)
- Tornado Alley (2012)
- National Parks Adventure (2016)
- Ancient Caves (2019)
- Wings over Water (2023)

The theater briefly closed in 2014 for roof repairs.

=== Mississippi River Visitor Center ===
Inside the museum's lobby is the National Park Service Visitor Center for the Mississippi National River and Recreation Area, which is free of charge. Mississippi River exhibits and National Park Rangers are available to help people learn about and experience the river. The visitor center is also equipped with resources to plan trips to any of the more than 390 national parks.

Center for Research and Collections

The Science Museum's Center for Research and Collections staff maintain a collection of over 1.7 million artifacts, objects, and specimens and conduct research in biology, paleontology, anthropology, water quality, and climate change. They also conduct outreach with museum visitors, school groups, fellow researchers, and the general public. The museum’s collections are held in a storage vault. Items include dinosaurs and other fossils, preserved animals and plants, and cultural artifacts from extinct and extant civilizations. Researchers visit the vault to take advantage of the collection, but it is not open to regular museum visitors except during special events.

St. Croix Watershed Research Station

The St. Croix Watershed Research Station, in Marine-on-St. Croix, Minnesota, is part of the Science Museum’s Center for Research and Collections. It is the museum’s headquarters for a team of scientists who study water around the world.

=== Kitty Andersen Youth Science Center ===
The Kitty Andersen Youth Science Center (KAYSC) is an informal learning environment for young people.

IDEAL Center

The museum is also home to the IDEAL (Inclusion, Diversity, Equity, Access and Leadership) Center, which has transformed from a primary professional development resource for educators in the state to a center that offers leadership development training to school districts, universities, and informal education organizations throughout the country.

== Special exhibitions ==
The museum hosts several special exhibitions a year, with past exhibitions having included:

- When Crocodiles Ruled (2000)
- Mysteries of Catalhoyuk (2001)
- Playing with Time (2002)
- Vikings: The North Atlantic Saga (2002)
- Robots and Us (2004)
- Seasons of Life and Land (2004)
- Invention at Play (2005)
- Strange Matter (2006)
- Body Worlds (2006)
- Animal Grossology (2006)
- Race: Are We So Different? (2007)
- Wild Music (2007)
- A Day in Pompeii (2007)
- Deadly Medicine (2008)
- Animation (2008)
- Star Wars: Where Science Meets Imagination (2008)
- CSI: The Experience (2008)
- Goose Bumps! The Science of Fear (2009)
- Water (2009)
- Titanic: The Artifact Exhibition (2009)
- The Dead Sea Scrolls: Words that Changed the World (2010)
- Geometry Playground (2010)
- Tutankhamun: The Golden King and the Great Pharaohs (2011)
- Identity: An Exhibit of YOU (2011)
- Nature Unleashed (2011)
- Real Pirates: The Untold Story of the Whydah from Slave Ship to Pirate Ship (2012)
- Lost Egypt: Ancient Secrets Modern Science (2012)
- Body Worlds & The Cycle of Life (2013)
- Maya: Hidden Worlds Revealed (2013)
- Ultimate Dinosaurs (2014)
- Design Zone (2014)
- Space: An Out-of-Gravity Experience (2015)
- Mummies: New Secrets from the Tombs (2016)
- Mindbender Mansion (2016)
- Mythic Creatures (2017)
- The Science Behind Pixar (2017)
- Mazes (2017)
- The Machine Inside: Biomechanics (2018)
- Towers of Tomorrow with LEGO Bricks (2018)
- Game Changers (2019)
- Inventing Genius (2019)
- Apollo: When We Went to the Moon (2020)
- Skin: Living Armor, Evolving Identity (2021)
- The Bias Inside Us (2021)

== Memberships ==
The Science Museum of Minnesota is a member of the Association of Science-Technology Centers, the American Alliance of Museums, the Association of Children’s Museums, and the Giant Screen Cinema Association. It is a founding member of the National Informal STEM Education Network (NISE Net) and participates in NanoDays.

== Education ==
The museum has an extensive STEM learning division. In addition to its summer camp and field trip programs, museum educators also visit schools throughout the region. The museum has a consistent track record of serving students and teachers in all 87 Minnesota counties each year through field trips, classroom residencies, and large-group assemblies on topics from water to engineering. Summer camps served hundreds of students each year, addressing science, technology, nature, and art themes. In 2025, the museum ended its summer camp programming.

== In popular culture ==
- In 2017, the character Dustin on the television show Stranger Things, set in the 1980s, wore a brontosaurus hoodie the museum sold in that era. The museum was quickly flooded with requests to purchase the garment, so it began manufacturing it again and took orders totaling $400,000 in a single day.
