= Anthony Wood (historian) =

British school teacher and historian

Anthony Wood (1923–1987) was a British school teacher and historian.

He was an expert on 19th and 20th century European history and was head of history at Winchester College. He was the author of the popular The Russian Revolution in the Seminar Studies in History series, which has not been out of print since it was first published in 1979.

== Selected publications ==
- Nineteenth Century Britain, 1815–1914. Longman, London, 1960. (Second edition 1982)
- Europe, 1815–1945. Longman, London.
- Europe, 1815–1960. Longman, London.
- Great Britain, 1900–65. Longman, London, 1978.
- The Russian Revolution. Longman, London, 1979. (Seminar Studies in History) (Second edition 1986)
- War in Europe, 1939–45. Longman, London, 1987. ISBN 0582354552
