= Patrick Garland (judge) =

British barrister and judge (1929–2023)

Sir Patrick Neville Garland (22 July 1929 – 6 August 2023) was a British barrister and judge. He was a judge of the High Court (Queen’s Bench Division) from 1985 to 2002.

== Early life ==
Born in Norfolk to the son of a long line of drapers, he was educated at Uppingham School. He also went to Sidney Sussex College, Cambridge, as an exhibitioner, where he earned a first class degree in law. He joined 11 Kings Bench Walk (later Keating Chambers) and was called to the Bar by the Middle Temple in 1953.

== Professional Life ==
As a junior barrister, he developed a busy common law practice which included some heavy criminal work, and construction became an increasing part of his practice. He was comfortable with highly technical issues of construction work involving close consideration of piles of technical drawings. These would have been impenetrable to many but Garland was at home with such matters. In 1971, he was appointed assistant recorder and then recorder on the Eastern Circuit. In 1972 he was appointed a Queen's Counsel, at the time, the youngest to be appointed.

Specialising increasingly in construction, he worked on many key construction issues including the Thames Barrier, the demolition of post-war high rise buildings and a landmark case on latent defects which arose in the construction of factory chimneys. He was appointed the first Chair of the Official Referees Bar Association and secured the same rank and status of High Court Judge for Official Referees, a reform that was long overdue.

He was appointed a Justice of the High Court on 14 October 1985, the first construction specialist to be appointed, and received the customary knighthood on 19 February 1986. He was assigned to the Queen’s Bench Division rather than the Official Referee’s court. After much prevarication, it was acknowledged on high that construction work was sufficiently important for the Official Referee’s Court to be abolished and replaced by High Court Judges sitting in the Technology and Construction Court. Garland’s appointment, which started the process, is testament to the high esteem in which he was held by the senior judiciary at the time.

He was appointed a Presiding Judge of the South Eastern Circuit in 1990 to 1993. Garland served as judge of the Employment Appeal Tribunal from 1986 to 1995 and was president of the Central Probation Council from 1986 to 2001.He retired on 14 October 2002.

Garland was an honorary fellow of Sidney Sussex College, Cambridge, and was also a member of the Free Speech Union's legal advisory council.

== Personal life ==
Garland married fellow East Anglian Jane Bird in 1955 and they had a daughter and two sons. He had many interests outside the law including a lifelong interest in steam agricultural machinery. A keen gardener, sportsman and countryman he maintained his contacts with Norfolk throughout his life and was a member of many associations and clubs throughout his life. Sir Patrick died on 6 August 2023, at the age of 94.
