= Anthony Fletcher =

English historian (1941–2026)

Anthony Fletcher FRHistS
- Born: Anthony John Fletcher; 24 April 1941
- Died: 3 January 2026 (aged 84)
- Occupations: Historian and academic

Academic background
- Education: Wellington College; Merton College, Oxford

Academic work
- Discipline: History
- Sub-discipline: Early modern Britain; English Civil War; Political history; Social history
- Institutions: King's College School; University of Sheffield; Durham University; University of Essex
- Notable works: The Outbreak of the English Civil War (1981)

Anthony John Fletcher FRHistS (24 April 1941 – 3 January 2026) was an English historian of the 17th century.

== Life and career ==
Fletcher was born on 24 April 1941. His parents were Dr. (Clarence) John Molyneux Fletcher (younger brother of Eric Fletcher, Baron Fletcher) and Isabel Chenevix Trench. His maternal grandfather Reginald Chenevix Trench, who died in the Great War, had a sister Cesca, a Sinn Féin supporter who was at the General Post Office, Dublin during the Easter Rising of 1916. Isabel Fletcher was born in November 1915, shortly before her father's death. Fletcher produced a series of recordings about his Irish forebears for the Irish Life and Lore website.

After government service as a research metallurgist at Harwell, he became an antiquarian who pioneered the use of dendrochronology in the Research Laboratory for Archaeology and the History of Art at the University of Oxford, dating medieval buildings, structures, and paintings on panel.

Fletcher was educated at Wellington College from 1954 to 1959, where he was an avid historian, journalist and stamp collector. In spite of his talent, he failed History at O-Level, which he considered "unpassable". On leaving school, he read history from 1959 at Merton College, Oxford, where he was a contemporary of R. I. Moore. At Oxford, he was particularly influenced by W. G. Hoskins.

He decided to teach history as a career, and spent three years doing so at King's College School, before becoming a lecturer at the University of Sheffield. He was subsequently appointed Professor at Durham University, from where he moved to the University of Essex. In his final post, from 2000 to 2005 he was Director of the Victoria County History. He was President of the Ecclesiastical History Society for 1996–97.

J. P. Kenyon called Fletcher's The Outbreak of the English Civil War "easily the most important book on the Great Rebellion in the past 20 years".

Fletcher's festschrift was published in 2007 by the Cambridge University Press (The Family in Early Modern England, edited by H Berry and E Foyster).

Fletcher died on 3 January 2026, at the age of 84.

== Works ==
- (with Diarmaid MacCulloch) Tudor Rebellions (1st ed., 1968; 2nd ed., 1973; 3rd ed., 1983; 4th ed., 1997; 5th ed., 2008)
- A County Community in Peace and War: Sussex 1600–1660 (1975)
- The Outbreak of the English Civil War (1981)
- History, Society and the Churches (1985)
- (ed. with John Stevenson) Order and Disorder in Early Modern England (1985)
- Reform in the Provinces: The Government of Stuart England (1986)
- (ed. with Peter Roberts) Religion, Culture, and Society in Early Modern Britain: Essays in Honour of Patrick Collinson (1994)
- Gender, Sex, and Subordination in England, 1500–1800 (1999)
- Growing Up in England: The Experience of Childhood 1600–1914 (2010)

== Notes ==
Professional and academic associations
Preceded by David M. Thompson	President of the Ecclesiastical History Society; 1996–1997	Succeeded by Stuart G. Hall
