= Alison Brown (historian) =

British historian

Alison Brown is emerita professor in the department of history at Royal Holloway, University of London. Brown is a specialist in the history of Renaissance Italy.

== Selected publications ==
- Bartolomeo Scala, 1430-1497, Chancellor of Florence: the humanist as bureaucrat. Princeton, N.J., Princeton University Press, 1979.
- The Renaissance. London, Longman, 1988. (Seminar Studies in History)
- Language and images of Renaissance Italy. Oxford, Clarendon Press, 1995. (Editor)
- Contested Space: Street Trading, Public Space, and Livelihoods in Developing Countries. Rugby, ITDG Publishing, 2006.
- The return of Lucretius to Renaissance Florence. Cambridge, Mass.: Harvard University Press, 2010.
- Medicean and Savonarolan Florence: the interplay of politics, humanism, and religion, Brepols, 2011.
- Piero di Lorenzo de' Medici and the Crisis of Renaissance Italy, Cambridge University Press, 2020
