= Seminar Studies in History =

Book series for undergraduate and younger students

The English Republic, 1649–60, Toby Barnard, 1982

Seminar Studies in History is a book series for undergraduate and younger students that aims to bridge the gap between the monograph and the full size university textbook. The series was established in 1968 by history teacher Patrick Richardson, and was one of the first series of academic history books to include documentary sources as standard.

== Aims and format ==
Seminar Studies in History was established and edited by Patrick Richardson, a history teacher of King's College School, Wimbledon. Roger Lockyer of Royal Holloway replaced Patrick Richardson as general editor following Richardson's death in 1979. The present series editors are Mark Stoyle and Gordon Martel (2026).

The series is targeted at undergraduate and younger students and aims to bridge the gap between articles or monographs and full size university textbooks. It was one of the first series of academic history books to include documentary sources as standard, when that was not fashionable amongst British educators. Volumes are typically of 100–150 pages, made up of an introductory essay followed by relevant documents and a detailed bibliography. The series was first published by Longman but has since been produced under a variety of imprints including Routledge, Taylor & Francis and Pearson Education.

== Authors ==
Many of the early volumes were written by history teachers at private schools, reflecting Richardson's own background. The Levellers (1968), for instance, was written by Howard Shaw of Harrow School, while The Russian Revolution, which has not been out of print since it was first published in 1979, was produced by Anthony Wood, head of history at Winchester College. The Weimar Republic (1974) was the work of John Hiden, formerly of Repton School. Later volumes, however, have increasingly been written by university historians.

Despite their relative brevity, some volumes have been influential in their field, such as Anthony Fletcher's volume on the Tudor Rebellions (1968) which has been through seven editions, with the most recent published in 2020. Central and Eastern European Review said of Hiden's The Weimar Republic that "arguably it has never been bettered".

== See also ==
- Access to History
