= Wingmen (novel) =

1979 novel by Ensan Case

- First edition cover
- Author: Ensan Case
- Language: English
- Genre: War; Historical; Romance
- Publisher: Avon Books
- Publication date: November 28, 1979
- Publication place: United States
- Pages: 408 (first edition)
- ISBN: 0-3804-7647-9
- OCLC: 1003642585

Wingmen is a war novel by American author Ensan Case. It was originally published on November 28, 1979, by Avon Books. The novel follows the lives and the relationship development between Ensign Fred Trusteau and Lieutenant commander Jack Hardigan, two United States Navy fighter pilots who are part of the fictional fighter squadron VF-20, during World War II.

After its original publishing, Wingmen soon went out of print and fell into obscurity. However, through the years, the novel started gaining a cult following and recognition as one of the first instances of gay protagonism in the genre, which led to its first republication in 2012, by Cheyenne Publishing. It's Case's first and most known of his two published novels.

== Plot ==
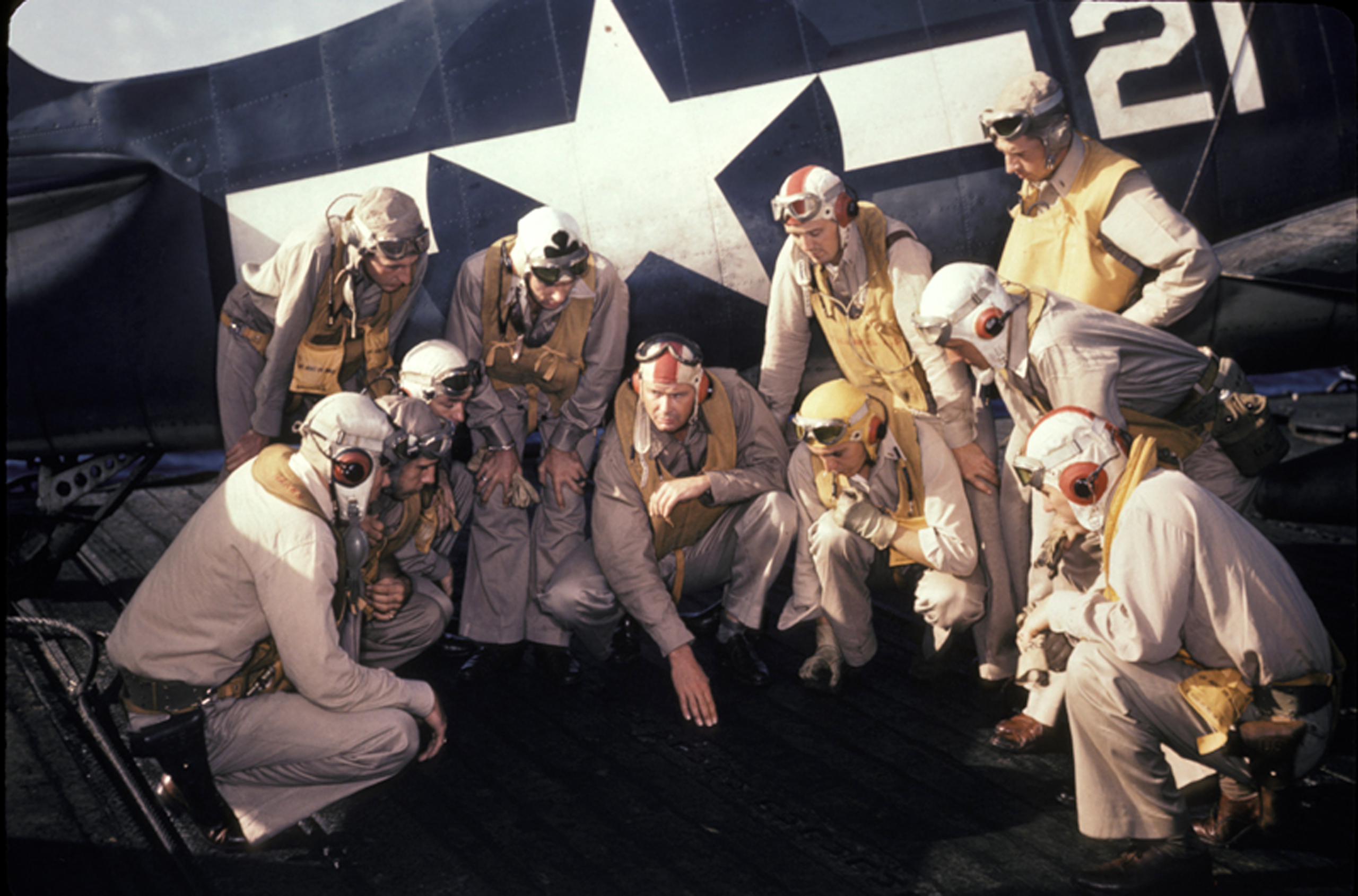
U.S. Navy squadron composed of Hellcat pilots, pictured in 1943.

The novel is set in the first half of the 1940s, during World War II. Unsatisfied with the squadron to which he belongs, Ensign Fred Trusteau, a United States Naval Aviator, offers to fill a vacant position in the Air Group Twenty's fighter squadron. He is then quickly transferred to VF-20 (the "Fighting Twenty"), which is led by Lieutenant commander Jack Hardigan, a man which Fred almost instantly considers more organized and well-mannered than his older commander. Right on his first day in the squadron, Fred breaks into a party held by his new fellow pilots and draws attention thanks to his trick of tying a knot in a cherry stem without using his hands, making him win the right to use the services of a female prostitute, to which he unwillingly agrees; after the event, he is given the nickname "Trusty" and is readily recognized among the group.

After a bridge match, Fred and some of his new friends are invited by Jack to play with him in his private room. There, both Jack and Fred have a good time, while the latter finds out they need someone to write the squadron's War Diary and proposes to fill the role, eager to impress the skipper. Jack, on the other hand, is constantly pestered by the commander of their air group (CAG), Buster Jennings, and so full of work on the ground he barely has time to fly. On a goodwill gesture, he goes to a party held by Eleanor Hawkins — a former shipmate's widow — with some other pilots, including the Executive Officer of Fighting Twenty, Duane Higgins, Jack's longtime friend and former wingman. At the party, Eleanor shows clear interest in Jack, but he is hesitant to show affection, puzzling Duane. Some days after another friendly conversation with Jack, Fred has a wet dream and discovers he fell in love with the skipper. VF-20 then leaves on the aircraft carrier Ironsides to its first mission, a wartime training cruise. While searching for the ready room, Fred, the first pilot to land on the carrier deck, accidentally collides with Admiral Berkey in a passageway, and the two have a friendly conversation before he goes his way. At that night, he decides to spend some time alone on the deck edge elevator and finds Jack there, in the first of a number of occasional meetings of the two in the place.

During a routine training flight, Fred intercepts a lost army trainer aircraft and is congratulated by Admiral Berkey, which raises his reputation in the squadron. Some days after, he and Jack squadron office have a chat in the squadron office, where they discuss their personal upbringings. Their newfound closeness starts to annoy Duane, who takes a dislike to Fred. The training cruise ends, and Fred goes on a night out in Honolulu with fellow pilots Brogan and Schuster. Brogan gets too drunk, and starts a fight with the officer of the deck on their return to Ironsides. Thanks to that, they're restricted to the ship for one week and have to receive an official reprimand; Jack, however, secretly removes Fred's one from his officer jacket. The squadron's first combat mission is revealed to be a training airstrike against the isolated Marcus Island. While destroying some enemy planes, Fred's Hellcat is hit by a blast and starts to malfunction. For a short time, much to Jack's dismay, Fred is presumed to be dead, but he manages to reach another carrier with his damaged aircraft. Afterwards, the two have a short talk and Jack realizes he's falling in love with Fred. Confused, Jack starts to avoid Fred's presence, while also having to deal with his father's sudden death. However, after their combat mission in Wake Island — in which Brogan is killed when they're rescuing Jennings — they reconnect with each other, now closer than ever.

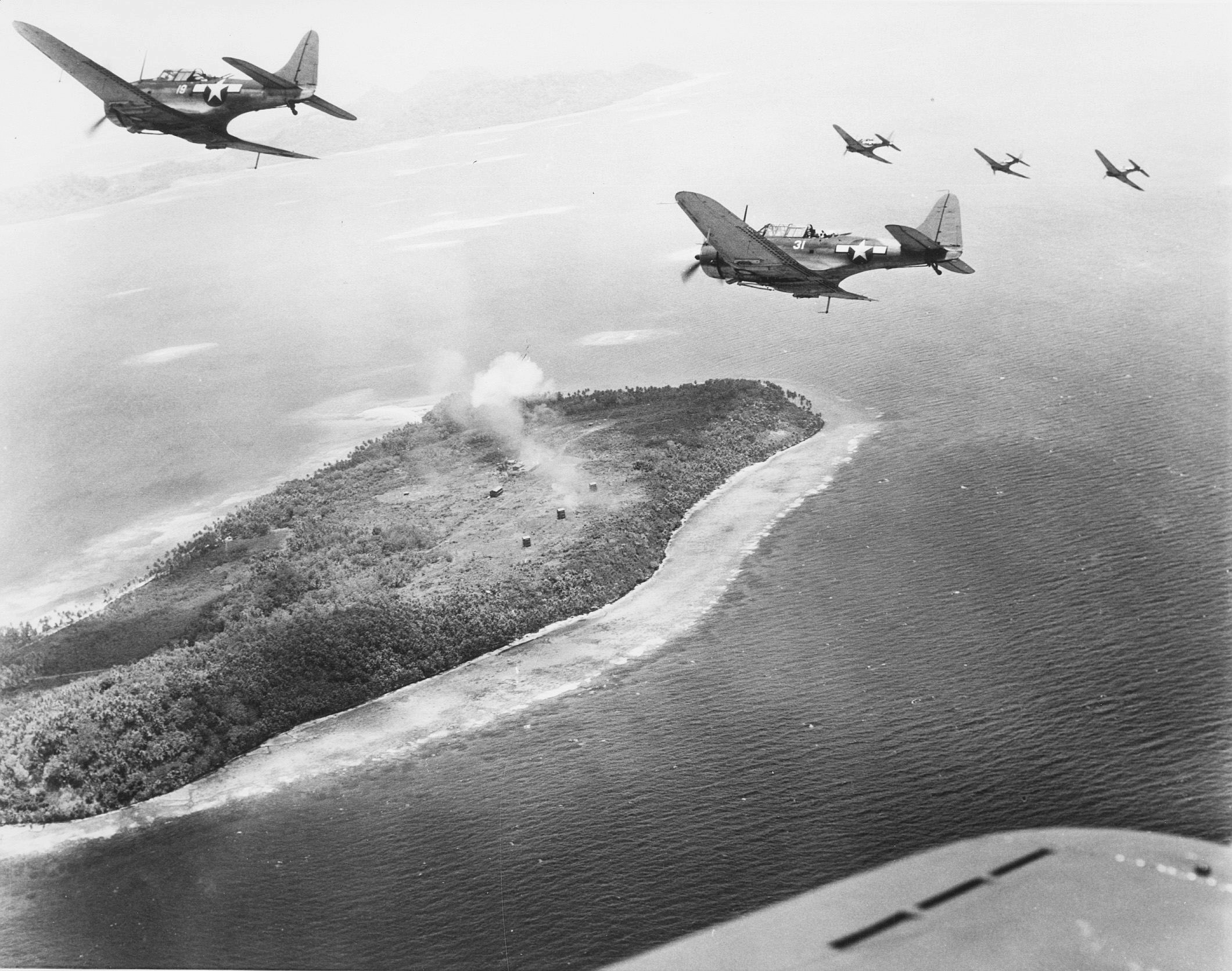
Truk Atoll under attack in February 1944.

Trying to discover more about her relationship with Jack, Duane sets up a date with Eleanor, and the two start a romance. Shortly after their involvement in the Battle of Tarawa, Jack and Fred are doing the last of the day's CAP when Flight Control finds out a bogey on their radar. The pair does an interception to what turned out to be a bunch of Japanese aircraft snoopers — Jack destroys two of them, and Fred, three. Their impressive performance earns them an Air Medal, and Fred becomes widely known as "the Killer" to the people of Ironsides, making Duane's envy towards him grow even further. During Christmas season of 1943, Air Group Twenty goes to spend some rest and recreation time at the Moana Hotel. Jack manages to book a sharing room with Fred and for the first time, despite Duane's suspicions about the nature of their relationship, they share moments of romantic intimacy and sleep together. Subsequent to this happening, both accept Jennings' offer to be part of a perilous "bat team", who takes down Japanese snooper aircraft after sunset, leaving Duane to lead the squadron's strikes in the upcoming Battle of Kwajalein. In the night before the battle, Fred, Jack and Jennings engage in a clash with a force of Japanese torpedo bombers attackers, and Jennings fails to return. Thanks to spending the night playing poker, Duane leads a sloppy strike which ends up with three squadron pilots dead, and is reprimended by the skipper. Duane later gets angry with his demotion in the next strike and Jack's lack of objections over his marriage with Eleanor, and hints about the true nature of the latter's relationship with Fred, causing the tension between them reach its peak.

After a wave of pessimism grasps VF-20's pilots due their hazy survival chances, an angry Jack lets out a harsh rant a day before their attack on Truk Atoll, which has a motivational effect over them. The squadron's strike launch is not entirely successful, with Duane's division getting lost on the way, setting Jack and Fred's division to fight alone against a larger number of Japanese aircraft. Duane's division arrives in time to save Jack, who in turn starts to search for Fred, finding him injured inside his damaged Hellcat. They both ditch their aircraft, and Jack takes care of Fred until a submarine rescues them.

=== Scrapbook and epilogue ===
After Truk, Fred's health problems make it impossible for him to continue in the Navy, and he's discharged as a full lieutenant. When his father dies, he takes over his family's hardware business, with a recently retired Jack as a part owner. Their company is very successful and they stay together until Jack dies from a heart attack, in 1969. At his funeral, Fred meets Duane again for the first time since his war days, and the two have a short talk about their past.

== Characters ==
Name	Initial military ranking (United States Navy)	Description
Frederick "Fred" Trusteau	Ensign	A twenty-one years old inexperienced ensign, Fred is the adopted son of a couple from San Jose, California. In spite of his mild character, he earnestly tries to build a good reputation among his boisterous colleagues and superiors, and soon goes to fly wing on his new commander, Jack Hardigan, with whom he starts to grow closer and fall in love. He's also called "Trusty" by his fellow pilots.
Jack Errol Hardigan	Lieutenant commander	Jack is the newly promoted commanding officer of VF-20, a good-looking man from Portland, Maine who, despite being a seasoned pilot, still struggles to think about his future and to establish a closer connection with colleagues, until Ensign Trusteau comes along.
Duane Higgins	Lieutenant	VF-20's Executive Officer, Duane is another old-timer pilot and Jack's friend since he flew wing on him during their Hornet days. Through the narrative their friendship slowly starts to sour, and he starts to grow jealous and suspicious of Jack's relationship with Fred.
Buster Jennings	Commander	The Commander of the Air Group Twenty, Jennings is an eager man known for being harsh towards his subordinates. Though he initially has a rocky relationship with Jack, this starts to change in the face of the latter's accomplishments.
Eleanor Hawkins	—N/a	A smart, wealthy and attractive woman that still has connections with military personnel thanks to being the widow of a Navy pilot. She initially shows interest in Jack, but gradually starts approaching Duane.
Hanson T. Brogan	Lieutenant	A hard-living and loud-mouthed pilot which, despite his contrasting personality and usual misdemeanors, becomes a close friend of Fred and teaches him how to play acey-deucey, his favorite game.
Clarence T. Berkey	Admiral	A makee-learn admiral on board of Ironsides for a while, Berkey is a friendly fiftyish years old former pilot who starts a friendship with Fred.
Sweeney	Yeoman	VF-20's yeoman, described as a little man with glasses.
"Boom" Bloomington	Lieutenant commander	A good-natured man known as Boom, which initially holds the position of VB-20's skipper.
Woody Heywood	Lieutenant commander	The torpedo squadron's skipper of the Air Group Twenty.

Other characters include Lieutenant Commander "Deadly" Deal — the skipper of VF-8 —, Lt. Overstreet — the square-jawed officer of the deck —, Chief Carmichael — with whom Duane plays poker —, Commander Mat Braden — Jack and Duane's former boss —, and VF-20's members Ensign John Anders, James R. Bagley, Ensign David Bigelow, Lt. (junior grade) Bracker, Lt. Bradley, Ensign Duggin, Lt. (j.g.) Fitzsimmons, Lt. (j.g.) Frank Hammerstein, Lt. (j.g.) Heckman, Ensign William C. Hill, Ensign Luden Hodges, Ensign Horace, Ensign Hughes, Ensign Dave Jacobs, Ensign Tom Jenkins, Ensign Levi, Ensign Patrick, Ensign Dave Peckerly, Ensign Rogers, Lt. C. T. Schuster and Lt. (j.g.) Smith. A fictionalized depiction of Admiral Nimitz also makes a short appearance.

== Background and development ==
Christopher Case began his first steps in writing in the mid-1960s, on a typewriter. During these years, he began developing a big interest in military matters, especially related to the United States Navy participation in World War II, which led him to read Richard L. Newhafer's historical novel The Last Tallyho (1964). After going to college and serving a two-year hitch in the U.S. Navy, he rediscovered and re-read the novel a decade later, with mixed feelings about it. That was "the genesis of Wingmen", according to Case, who wrote the novel in 1978, when he was twenty eight years old, using the pen name Ensan Case. The author considered Wingmen as a sort of retaliation of the former novel, since The Last Tallyho presents two gay Navy pilots which "were portrayed as totally irredeemable cowards and slackers", something that pissed him off. Both novels are set aboard fictional American aircraft carriers in Pacific during World War II, with Wingmen, in the words of Case, "[having] its protagonists a pair of gay pilots who were the exact opposites of Newhafer's." He also "thanks to silly Dick Newhafer and his first Tallyho” on Wingmen's dedication page.

Due to the time period in which the novel was materialized, heterosexual sex scenes were depicted in more detail in comparison to the homosexual ones, which are merely implied. Case explained that a major publisher would block a more explicit presence of the latter, which made him thought heterosexual sex insertions could "keep the mainstream reader interested and let [him] tell Jack and Fred's story."

== Setting and period ==
VF-20 War Diary's entries depicted in the novel

Year	Days						
1943	S	M	T	W	T	F	S
March			2				
March						19	
June			8				
June		14					
June	20	21			24		
August	1	2	3				
August					12		
September		6					
October				6	7		
October			26				
November				10			
November			23				
December	5	6					
1944	S	M	T	W	T	F	S
January					20		
January		31					
February					10		12

VF-20's naval air station (green) and combat missions (red).

1	Naval Air Station Ford Island
2	Marcus Island
3	Wake Island

4	Tarawa Atoll
5	Kwajalein Atoll
6	Truk Atoll

Following a common historical fiction convention, Wingmen presents a fictional plot set in a past event. Though its characters, squadrons, air groups and carriers are all made up, the military operations they participate during the Pacific Ocean theater of World War II — namely the ones in Marcus Island, Wake Island, Tarawa Atoll (Battle of Tarawa), Kwajalein Atoll (Battle of Kwajalein) and Truk Atoll (Operation Hailstone) — all are based on real-life incidents. Most of the novel's action happens in 1943–44, amid the Pacific War, occasionally in some recognizable Oahu locations, such as the remarkable Pearl Harbor Naval Station and Ford Island Naval Air Station, as well as the Moana and Royal Hawaiian hotels.

=== Aircraft featured in the novel ===
- Curtiss SB2C Helldiver — used in a four-plane division by VB-20.
- Douglas SBD Dauntless — main aircraft used by VB-20.
- Grumman F6F Hellcat — main aircraft used by VF-20.
- Grumman F4F Wildcat — used by the Air Group Twenty during their combat air patrol training.
- Grumman TBF Avenger — main aircraft used by VT-20.
- Mitsubishi A6M Zero ("Zeke"/"Hamp") — main aircraft used by the Imperial Japanese Navy.
- Mitsubishi G4M ("Betty") — used by the Japanese located in Marcus Island and also as snoopers.
- Nakajima B5N ("Kate") — used by the Japanese as snoopers.
- Vought F4U Corsair — used in a four-plane division by VF-20.
- Yokosuka D4Y ("Judy") — used by the Japanese located in Marcus Island.

== Style and themes ==
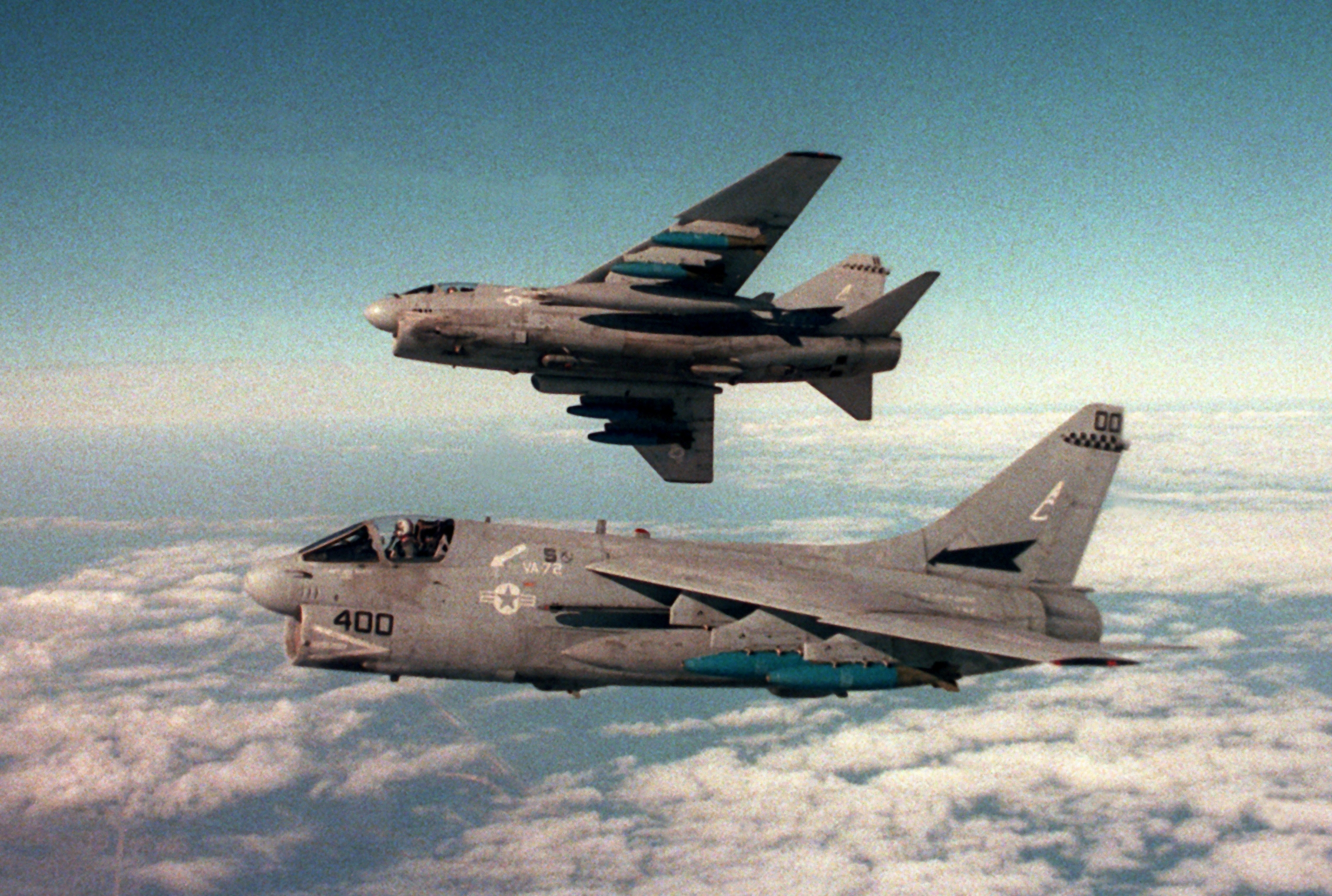
Two U.S. Navy aircraft employing the leader-wingman formation. The growing confidence and trust between officers working together is one of the novel's central themes.

In his analysis of the novel, scholar Eric Patterson identified Wingmen's main topic as being homosexual affection and desire inside an environment "that at once are intensely homosocial and intensely homophobic". Despite this, he believes labeling it as a "romantic gay novel" would be "somewhat misleading", due the popular patterns that usually are attached to the term and the generalizations that are made about gay men. To him, Case focused on portraying the complex dilemma in which men who love men and frequent all-male environments, because of their desire to share the "intense comradeship in work and in play that men can create together", can be upon when they fall in love in love with a colleague and want to retain "both types of male intimacy." Comradeship being two men in those spaces is also deeply explored, with Patterson evoking Allan Bérubé to explain how the war can blurry the boundary between the homosocial and the homosexual, "and to some degree neutralized the homophobia that usually was ready to police that boundary and suppress the expression of affection and attraction between men." Living together through buddy systems and constantly saving each other's lives, homosexual men like Fred and Jack "become essential to one another", and were able to form a close relationship despite the constant surveillance and alienation "from the compulsory — and compulsive — heterosexuality all around them", many times here embedded by Duane Higgins, which Patterson describes as a "picture of the emergence of aggressive homophobia."

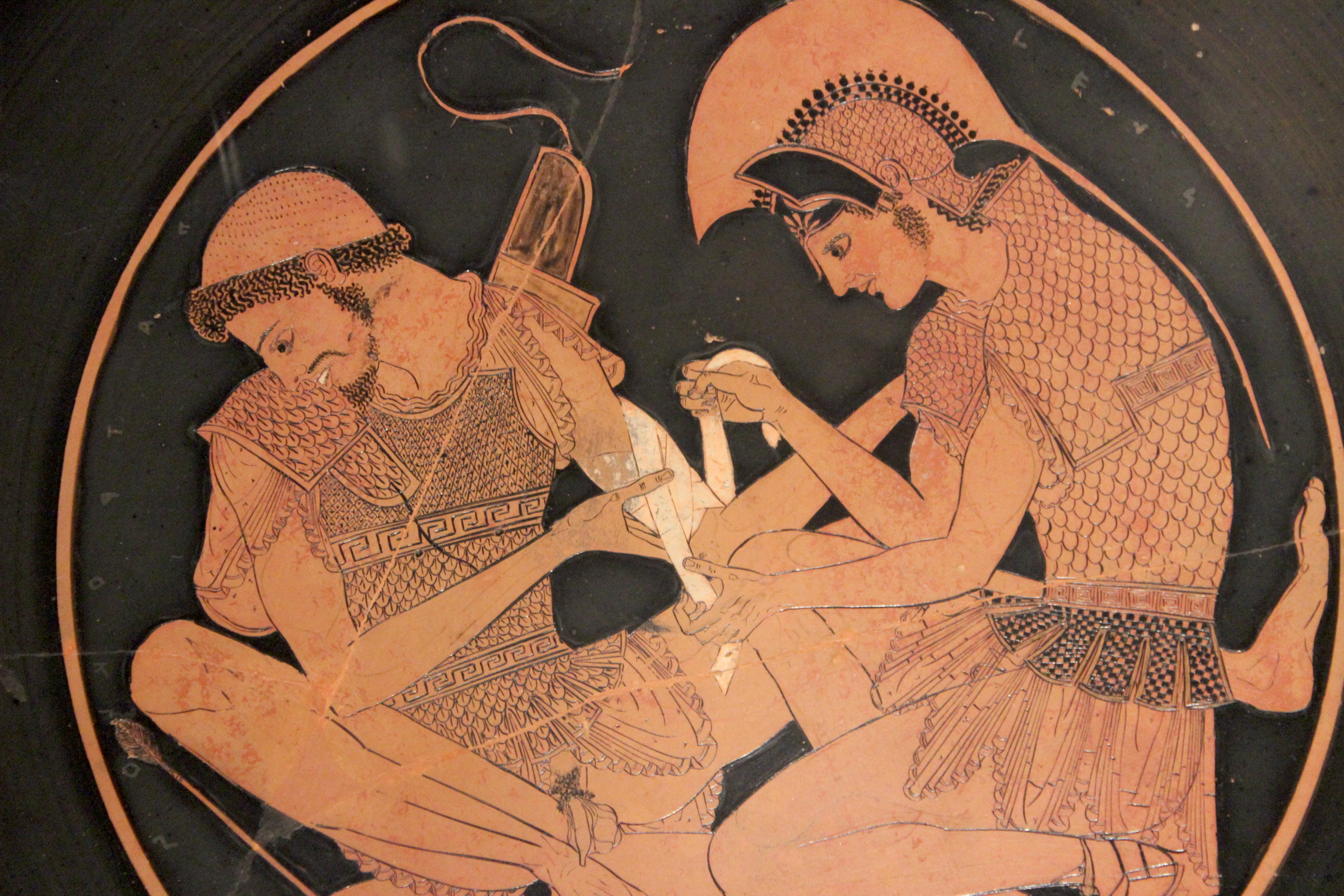
Achilles and Patroclus, a common example of the ideal Greek "male warrior couple".

Patterson places Wingmen inside the "modernism realism" vein of World War II fiction depicting men in war — together with works like Norman Mailer's The Naked and the Dead and Herman Wouk's The Caine Mutiny — which follow "a strong tradition of realistic writing confronting the physical and psychological ordeal of war." Through a chronological narrative, Case "presents the perspectives of several central characters with deliberately limited comment on their significance", using fictional military documents to deepen the context, rather than making the narrator tell the characters' motivations. He describes Case's writing as "spare and taut, without any of the inflated rhetoric that weighs down many novels about the war, particularly the more commercial ones", highlighting the presence of battle scenes showing an "almost cinematic perspective on the experience of flying in war" in the novel. Patterson also points out to what he considers a subversion of paradigm realized by Wingmen: it puts a love story between men on focus, instead of the traditional archetypic of the war genre, which arguably offers romance with women as a reward for men's sacrifices. According to him, the relationship between Fred and Jack is presented as a love between equals and can be seem as a Classical parallel, stemming inside a homoerotic elegy tradition of "the bond of a male warrior couple" — a widespread concept that could be traced back to the Ancient Greek culture and is found, among other examples, in Homer's Iliad and the Sacred Band of Thebes. He summarizes:

Heterosexual or homosexual, all such comrade relationships are intensely, though often quietly, emotional and often physically affectionate. For men in such contexts who are physically attracted to each other, intense sexual interaction can parallel the intense excitement of interaction in warfare or athletic contests. Both involve a shared thrill that is only possible together.

== Publication story ==
Wingmen was originally released on November 28, 1979, by Avon Books. At the time, Avon was already known for publishing novels with gay themes, including Gordon Merrick's popular Peter & Charlie Trilogy. Case expected the book to bring him a big feedback, but it went through only one printing, when sales stopped. He originally considered the situation "ultimately disappointing", something he attributed to the novel being "too far ahead of its time." Case published just one more novel, Beach Head (1983), turning his attention to other pursuits.

Comparison of notable textual differences between Wingmen editions
Original text	Re-release text
For T. P., with love. Thanks to silly Dick Newhafer and his first Tallyho.	Thanks to silly Dick Newhafer and his first Tallyho.
And his stepfather could never have handled himself the way the skipper did now. His stepfather had not been either approachable or self-assured.	And his father could never have handled himself the way the skipper did now. His father had not been either approachable or self-assured.
Fred never saw or heard from him again.	Fred knew he would never hear from him again.

Eventually, interest over Wingmen slowly grew, with the novel building up a small online fanbase through the years. Book copies turned into rarity, and some were sold as high as US$300. In 2011, Case became aware of the novel newfound popularity after, on a lark, he searched "Wingmen Ensan Case" on the internet, finding himself "stunned by the result." He then contacted fellow author Elliott Mackle, who helped him retrieve the novel's rights and find a new publisher, Cheyenne Publishing, which re-released Wingmen on February 6, 2012, with minor textual revisions. Cheyenne Publishing went out of business in 2014, and the novel was re-released again on July 4 of the same year by Lethe Press, for the first time with an audiobook version available.

For legal reasons, all three releases have different covers. Case declared his dislike towards the original cover, since he "[didn't] like to put a detailed face on [his] characters", and also because it's inaccurate to the novel narrative. Furthermore, he praised Alex Beecroft's cover for the Cheyenne release, calling it a "masterpiece."

== Reception ==
=== Critical response ===
Contemporary reviews

Wingmen's initial reception in gay media was mixed. On a positive note, Roger Austen from The Advocate felt the novel was "gratifying to read," stating that he didn't know "what effect it will have on you, but this is probably how it will affect Case's fellow war novelists: Norman Mailer will clench his fists and swear and refuse to believe it, Gore Vidal will say, 'I told you so,' and James Jones will turn over in his grave." Writing for Gamma, a Milwaukee gay newsletter, Rob Mayer described Wingmen as "a finely crafted novel [...] that gay people can be justly proud of," adding that "if it were up to [him], it would become a true classic of its genre."

Some critics, however, felt the novel needed a more elaborate perspective on gay identity and relationships. While calling it a "well-written, enjoyable novel with plenty of action and an attractive premise," Mom... Guess What!'s James K. Graham found Wingmen "mildly disappointing." He opined that "the only reason for incorporating a gay relationship into a war novel would be to examine closely and in depth the effects of the environment on the relationship," but Case "was barely getting below the surface." In a similar vein, a reviewer from Seattle Gay News wrote that "Case says the story is about the difficulty men have expressing emotions and that's the book's weakest point. It would be far more interesting with a little more expression and a lot less holding back." Pat M. Kuras of Gay Community News said Case "was too frightened by his own queers-in-love theme to deal with it directly," and noted that "throughout the 400-or-so pages of this novel, the words gay, homosexual, even queer or faggot, are not mentioned once." Kuras classified the story as a "World War II fairy tale" with "no discussion of sexuality" and where the protagonists have "no coming out scenes to one another."

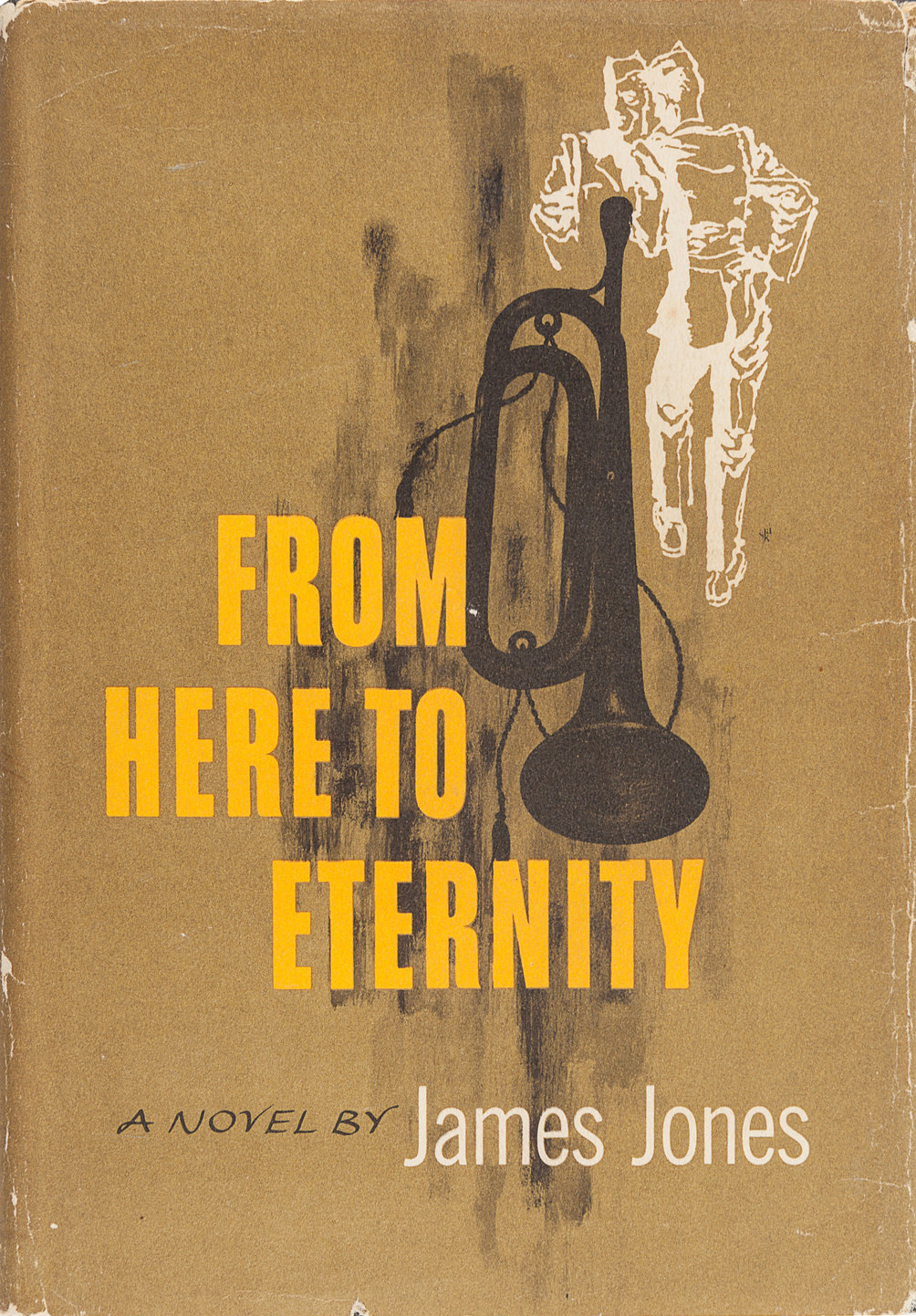
Some critics compared Wingmen favorably to From Here to Eternity, asserting that it deserves a status similar to James Jones' novel.

Retrospective appraisal

Upon its re-release, Wingmen received wider praise. Writing for glbtq.com, Eric Patterson summarized Wingmen as "a remarkable and valuable novel. Its social and psychological insight, as well as artistry, substantial and impressive as they were when it first was published, have only increased over time.” He also praised Case's writing style, defining it as "complex, controlled, and austere." Describing it as an “early gem,” James Doig Anderson of GLBTRT opined that "Wingmen is a wonderful and moving novel" that is "highly recommended to all readers who enjoy great gay fiction." Bay Area Reporter's Jim Provenzano declared that “fans of war stories will prefer this tome, whose focus gets very specific with the details of flying planes and crashing them," summarizing Wingmen as a novel that "reads like postwar fiction of the 1950s, but with a discreet gay affair that does eventually inspire a late dramatic turn of events." Alan Chin from the San Francisco Examiner deemed Wingmen "a well-written, exciting, and emotionally touching novel" that is "bound to become a classic in gay literature." Gay Book Reviews writer Sirius rated the novel 5+ out of 5 stars, classifying it as "highly recommended" and "mesmerizing," but criticizing the Scrapbook chapter, which he found "an unnecessary extra. [...] I wish the book stopped in 1944 at its emotionally high point."

=== Commercial performance ===
According to Case, Avon Books originally printed and distributed a total of 60,536 copies of Wingmen through the United States in late 1979. The novel was considered a commercial disappointment, since by June 30, 1983 only 24,694 of these had sold, which earned him a grand total of US$3,496.10. The author believed the unsold copies were recalled and destroyed.

== Legacy ==
Author Elliott Mackle stated Wingmen is a big influence on his works, and that he knows "no better m/m adventure-romance set during World War II." Mackle dedicated his novel Only Make Believe to Case, "who created a genre with Wingmen." As claimed by Case, in 1980 he received a letter from a World War II veteran pilot who told him "Jack and Fred's story had been his story as well", and that he regretted not being able to tell it in his autobiography. The veteran was identified as being Jack M. Ilfrey.

== Spin-off novel ==
In late 2015 Case announced that he had written three quarters of a Wingmen spin-off novel titled Fighters, intending to complete it "in a couple of months" to a release in the first quarter of 2016. Set in the same time frame of the original novel while, according to the author, not being a clone of it, Fighters would center on an intense relationship between an Army Colonel and a professional boxing trainer. It also would feature "much more war-era humor" and several gay characters, including a cameo appearance of Fred Trusteau, which would be connected to the time he almost shot down an Army general plane during his training cruise. Case died in October 2024, and Fighters remains unpublished.
