= Waves of the Danube =

Waltz composed by Iosif Ivanovici in 1880

- by Ion Ivanovici
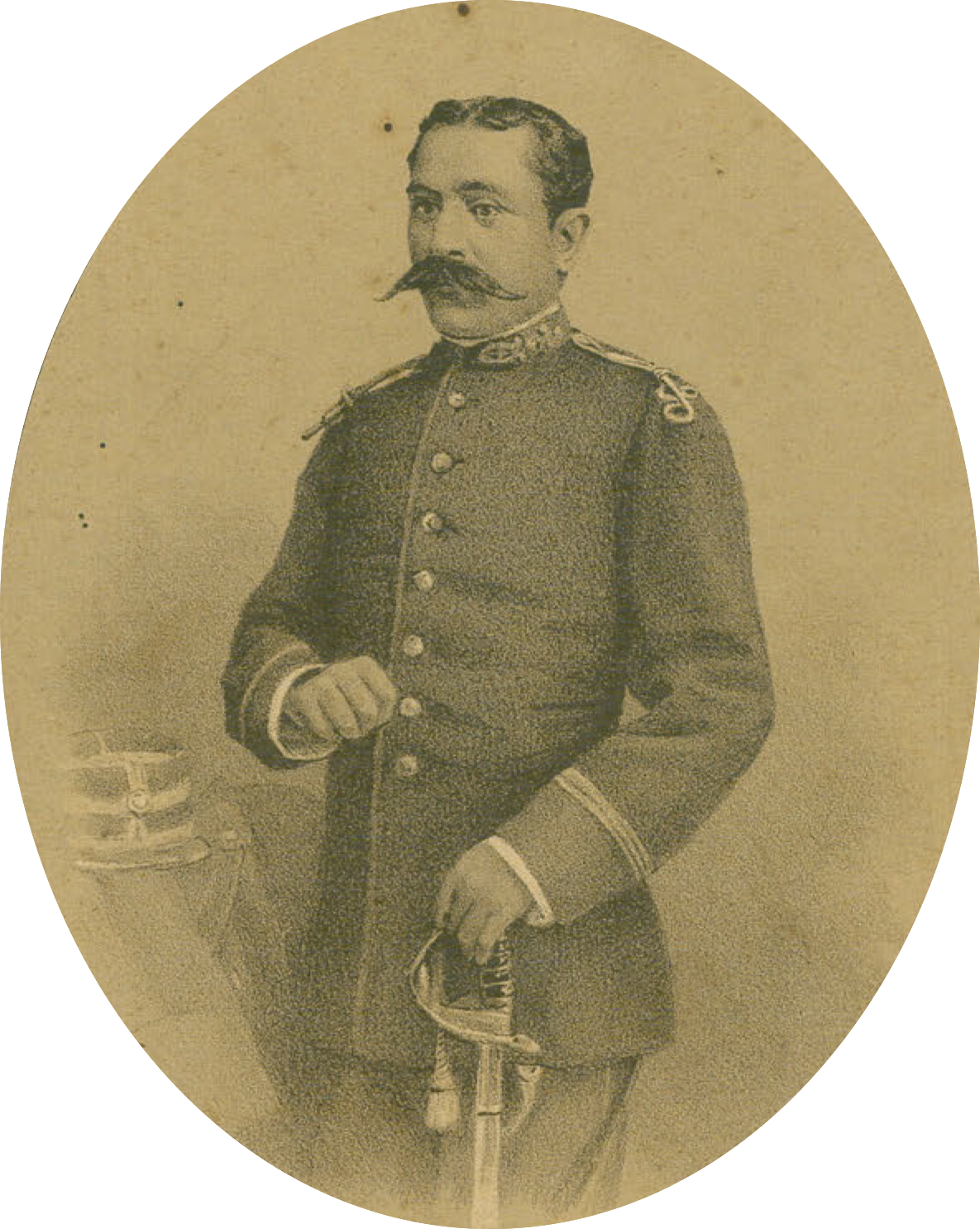
- The composer c. 1890
- Native name: Valurile Dunării
- Published: 1880

Part 1

Part 2
1938 recording, conducted by Arthur Fiedler

"Waves of the Danube" (Romanian: Valurile Dunării) is a waltz composed by Ion Ivanovici in 1880, and is one of the most famous Romanian tunes in the world. The song has many variations throughout the piece, reminiscent of the music of Johann Strauss. Through the Viennese style variations, there is still a distinct Slavic style. In the United States, it is frequently referred to as "The Anniversary Song", a title given by Al Jolson when he and Saul Chaplin released an adaptation of the song in 1946.

== Rise to prominence ==
"Waves of the Danube" was first published in Bucharest in 1880. It was dedicated to Emma Gebauer, the wife of music publisher Constantin Gebauer. Composer Émile Waldteufel made an orchestration of the piece in 1886, which was performed for the first time at the 1889 Paris Exposition, and took the audience by storm. It won the march prize to mark the exhibition out of 116 entries.

Ivanovici's "Danube Waves" was published in the United States in 1896 and republished in 1903 by the Theodore Lohr Company in an arrangement for piano by Simon Adler. The published version was called "Waves of the Danube". The composition is also known as "Danube Waves Waltz".

== Use in popular music ==
=== "In Praise of Death" ===
The melody of "Waves of the Danube" was used in what is regarded as Korea's first popular (trot) song, "In Praise of Death" (also translated as "Hymn of Death" and "Ode to Death") by Yun Sim-deok, recorded in 1926. The song was recorded in Osaka, where she met and fell in love with a Korean married man. The two boarded a steamship returning to Korea, but ended their lives by jumping into the sea.

=== "The Anniversary Song" ===
"Waves of the Danube" became well known in the United States only half a century later. Al Jolson and Saul Chaplin published it in 1946 under the name of "The Anniversary Song" ("Oh, how we danced on the night we were wed") and as their own composition, not to be confused with "The Anniversary Waltz" (1941) by Dave Franklin (music) and Al Dubin (lyrics). The 1946 sheet music of the song credits the composers as Al Jolson and Saul Chaplin with music by Iosif Ivanovici. Jolson and Chaplin wrote the lyrics while Chaplin adapted Ivanovici's music.

Al Jolson released "The Anniversary Song" on Decca as catalog number 23714. It first reached the Billboard charts on February 7, 1947, and lasted 14 weeks on the chart, peaking at #2.

== Other recordings of "The Anniversary Song" ==
- Dinah Shore released a version of the song on Columbia as catalog number 37234; it first reached the Billboard charts on February 28, 1947, and lasted eight weeks on the chart, peaking at #4.
- A recording by Guy Lombardo was cut on December 13, 1946, and released by Decca Records as catalog number 23799; it first reached the Billboard charts on February 14, 1947, and lasted 10 weeks on the chart, peaking at #4.
- Tex Beneke and the Glenn Miller Orchestra featuring Garry Stevens and the Mello Larks on vocals released a version of the song in 1947 on RCA Victor as catalog number 20-2126; it first reached the Billboard charts on February 21, 1947, and lasted eight weeks on the chart, peaking at #3.
- Artie Shaw and his New Music Orchestra released a version the same year.
- Anne Shelton recorded the song in 1946 for Decca Records in the UK.
- Andy Russell and Paul Weston released a version on Capitol Records as catalog number 368; it first reached the Billboard charts on March 14, 1947, and lasted two weeks on the chart, peaking at #5.
- Bing Crosby recorded the song on March 28, 1947, with Victor Young and his Orchestra and the Ken Darby Singers for Decca Records and it was included in his album Auld Lang Syne.
- Guitarist Django Reinhardt and the Quintette du Hot Club de France released a version in 1947 on Blue Star as a 78, Blue Star 33.
- Frank Sinatra performed The Anniversary Song for radio broadcast. The recording is available on the Frank Sinatra collection The Radio Years.
- Pat Boone recorded the song in 1958 and it was included in his album Star Dust.
- Joni James included the song in her album Among My Souvenirs (1958).
- Connie Francis included a bilingual version in English and Yiddish in her album Connie Francis Sings Jewish Favorites in 1960.
- Mitch Miller and his Gang also performed and recorded the song and it was included in the album Happy Times! – Sing Along with Mitch (1961).
- Andy Williams included the song in his album The Academy Award–Winning "Call Me Irresponsible" and Other Hit Songs from the Movies (1964).
- Eddie Fisher included the song in his Jolson tribute album You Ain't Heard Nothin' Yet (1968).
- Tom Jones included the song in his album Say You'll Stay Until Tomorrow (1977).
- In 1959, a rock-and-roll instrumental version entitled "Big River", performed by the Buddy Brennan Quartet, reached the Music Vendor Top 100.
- In 1972, a rocked up version was released by Traffic drummer Jim Capaldi on his album Oh How We Danced.
- Willie Nelson included the song in his album December Day: Willie's Stash, Vol. 1 (2014).

=== "Der Chasene Waltz" ===
An arrangement by Henry Lefkowitch with Yiddish lyrics by Chaim Towber was published in 1947 as "Der Chasene Waltz" ("The Wedding Waltz"). However, the online catalog of the Florida Atlantic University Libraries contains a record that has 1941 as publication date for this song.

== In film ==
In 1931, film director Josef von Sternberg used the melody in his film Dishonored, in which Marlene Dietrich mimed several piano performances of it. The tune was next used, without being credited, in the 1934 American comedy film The Circus Clown.

Under the name of "The Anniversary Song" it was featured in Al Jolson's biographical Columbia film The Jolson Story in 1946 and the sequel Jolson Sings Again (1949), as well as in Blondie's Anniversary in 1947. Under the name "Waves of the Danube" the tune was used in Akira Kurosawa's 1949 film Stray Dog.

After World War II the tune was used in 1959 in a Romanian film by Liviu Ciulei dealing with the war, titled, after the song, Valurile Dunării. A cover by The New Vaudeville Band was used in 1968 as the title song for cult British Hammer horror The Anniversary starring Bette Davis. It has also appeared in the movies Sex and the Single Girl in 1964, Mayerling in 1968, Falling in Love Again in 1980, When Father Was Away on Business in 1985, Avalon in 1990, Payback in 1999, Father and Daughter in 2000, and A Guy Thing in 2003.

"Waves of the Danube" is used in and referred to by characters in the 1963 Soviet film Alyonka, directed by Boris Barnet, in which a newly-graduated dentist imagines her new life on the steppe accompanied by Ivanovici's melody.

This tune was also used by the Indian film maker Raj Kapoor in many of his movies, from Barsaat (1949) to Dharam Karam (1975).

This song is also sung in the Japanese movie "Tree Without Leaves" (Rakuyoju, 1986).

In the biographical film Persona Non Grata (2015), this waltz is used in one of the final acts in a dance between the protagonist Chiune Sugihara and his wife near by an orchestra.

== On television ==
The song was sung with American lyrics by Don Most (as character Ralph Malph) on the ABC sitcom Happy Days, in the 1976 episode titled "They Shoot Fonzies Don't They?"

== In books ==
The song is sung by Alexander-Shura, the main character of the novel The Bronze Horseman (2001) by Paullina Simons, the night of his wedding with Tatiana, in Lazarevo.

== Fame in other countries ==
- The tune, along with the corresponding lyrics used in the movie Valurile Dunării, was very popular in China beginning in the 1960s.
- The melody of "Waves of the Danube" has been well known in Korea, since the 1920s, thanks to the soprano Youn Shim-Deok. It is known there as "The Psalm of Death".
- Japanese instrumental rock group Takeshi Terauchi & Bunnys recorded this on their 1967 album Let's Go Unmei.
- In Kintetsu Nagoya Station of Nagoya, Japan, Kintetsu Railway uses a combination of this tone together with sections from "The Big Ben Chimes" as the departure melody for its limited express services departing from Nagoya towards Osaka since 1978.
- The interlude of "Jeena Yehann Maranaa Yehann" in the Bollywood film Mera Naam Joker uses this tune.
- In Peru, an instrumental recording from Grady Martin is the best known and the most popular. It is played both at weddings and quinceañeras.
- The Dutch film, Father and Daughter uses this melody, along with variations from the original melody.
