= Ensan Case =

American novelist and police officer (1950–2024)

- Case in the 1990s
- Born: Christopher Ernest Case; July 3, 1950; Savannah, Georgia, U.S.
- Died: October 1, 2024 (aged 74); Claxton, Georgia, U.S.
- Education: Georgia Tech
- Occupations: Novelist; Police officer
- Writing career
- Period: 1970s–1980s; 2010s (novelist); 1993–2011 (police officer)
- Notable work: Wingmen (1979)

Christopher Ernest Case (July 3, 1950 – October 1, 2024), known by his pen name Ensan Case, was an American novelist and police officer.

== Life and career ==
Christopher Ernest Case was born on July 3, 1950, in Savannah, Georgia, to Leon Case Jr. and Stella Case. He had two brothers and two sisters. Case began his first steps in writing in the mid-1960s, on a typewriter. After earning a Bachelor of Science in Behavioral Management from Georgia Tech in 1972, he served two years in the United States Navy. Case wrote his first novel — a contemporary gay tale set in San Francisco — in 1974. He submitted the manuscript to Avon Books, which expressed some interest in it but ultimately turned it down. He lived in Reno, Nevada, in the 1970s, and later in the Bay Area with a longtime male lover.

His first and most known published novel, Wingmen, was published in 1979 by Avon. The novel was written as a sort of retaliation for Richard L. Newhafer's novel The Last Tallyho (1964), which, according to him, portrayed gay characters "as totally irredeemable cowards and slackers." Wingmen, in the words of Case, "have as its protagonists a pair of gay pilots who were the exact opposites of Newhafer’s." The novel received positive reviews from literary critics but was a commercial disappointment, leading Case to consider the experience "ultimately disappointing."

His second published novel, Beach Head, was released in 1983 by Zebra Books. He wrote another novel in the 1980s, but after failing to find a publisher for it, he decided to end his career as a writer. Case had an avid interest in matters military, mostly centered on World War II, which he used as a setting in his works. He exchanged letters for years with World War II fighter ace Jack M. Ilfrey, who reportedly told him that "Jack and Fred’s story had been his story as well, and he regretted being unable to honestly tell it to the world."

In 1993, Case started working as a police officer in Tybee Island, Georgia. He retired in 2011 as a major. In the same year, he googled "Wingmen Ensan Case" on a lark and was "astounded to discover that it had not disappeared from existence, but had become a sort of cult classic." Wingmen's newfound cult following prompted Case's return to writing — he announced that a Wingmen spin-off novel titled Fighters would be released in 2016, but this never materialized.

In October 2024, Case died in Claxton, Georgia, after a prolonged illness.
