= Bronze Horseman (disambiguation) =

Bronze Horseman is an equestrian statue by Étienne Maurice Falconet.

Bronze Horseman or Bronze Horse may also refer to:

- "The Bronze Horseman" (poem), a poem by Alexander Pushkin
- The Bronze Horseman (novel), a novel by Paullina Simons
- Symphony No. 10 ("The Bronze Horseman"), a symphony by Nikolai Myaskovsky
- Le cheval de bronze (The Bronze Horse), an opera by Daniel Auber
- Bronze Horse Award, the grand prize of the Stockholm International Film Festival
- Bronze (horse), a highly successful and influential broodmare
