= Tatiana and Alexander =

Romance novel by Paullina Simons

- First edition
- Author: Paullina Simons
- Original title: The Bridge to Holy Cross
- Language: English
- Series: The Bronze Horseman Trilogy
- Genre: Romance, historical novel, war novel
- Publisher: HarperCollins
- Publication place: United States
- Pages: 576
- ISBN: 978-0-06-103112-0 (paperback)
- Preceded by: The Bronze Horseman
- Followed by: The Summer Garden

Tatiana and Alexander (also known as The Bridge to Holy Cross) is a romance novel written by Paullina Simons and the second book in the Bronze Horseman Trilogy. The novel continues the story of Tatiana Metanova and her husband Alexander Belov.

== Plot ==
Tatiana finds work as a nurse at Ellis Island, where she and Anthony start living. She befriends Vikki, another nurse, and Edward Ludlow, a doctor, who Vikki believes has taken a liking for Tatiana. Although she has started to build a new life for herself and Anthony, the possibility that Alexander might still be alive haunts her. Her suspicions are further raised by Alexander's Hero of the Soviet Union medal which she finds in her bag.

Tatiana buys land in Arizona from the money that Alexander had hidden in the Bronze Horseman book. Gradually, she begins to overcome her past, and is known to everyone as the "Angel of Ellis", because of all the immigrants she has helped get jobs.

Meanwhile, in the Soviet Union, Alexander narrowly escapes death at the hands of the Soviet Government. However, he is ordered to lead a battalion of convicted criminals and head westward into Germany. Alexander finds this to his advantage, as then he could escape to America. He, after losing many men, finally makes it to German soil, where he encounters Pasha Metanov. He had survived the attack on the train, and joined the German Army. When he learns about his family, and Alexander's plan, he agrees to surrender to the Germans. Thus, they are taken to Colditz.

When they try to escape, Pasha succumbs an illness, while Alexander is imprisoned again. Once the war is over, POWs from all around Europe are sent back home, except for the Soviets. Alexander is sentenced to twenty five years in a work camp.

Tatiana volunteers as a Red Cross nurse, and eventually finds Alexander. She helps him escape and they fight their way out of the prison and across Germany and make it to the American Embassy in Berlin. After a lengthy explanation of his situation, Alexander manages to convince the American authorities to let him and Tatiana leave for the US.

Note: An earlier edition of this book, titled "The Bridge to Holy Cross" had an epilogue and some extra chapters. Those extra chapters described Alexander meeting Anthony for the first time, and also Vikki, who is happy to have finally met him. These were removed later on, once Simons wrote the third book, "The Summer Garden", because she felt these extra chapters did not exactly lead into the new book.
