= Eleven Hours =

1998 novel by Paullina Simons

- First edition
- Author: Paullina Simons
- Language: English
- Genre: Thriller, Crime novel
- Publisher: St. Martin's Press
- Publication date: June 1998
- Publication place: United States
- Media type: Print (Hardback & Paperback)
- Pages: 292 pp (first edition, hardback)
- ISBN: 978-0-312-18091-1 (first edition, hardback)
- OCLC: 38325447
- Dewey Decimal: 813/.54 21
- LC Class: PS3569.I48763 E4 1998

Eleven Hours (1998) is a Thriller novel by author Paullina Simons.

== Plot summary ==
On the eve of giving birth to her third child, Didi Wood goes to the mall to escape the Dallas heat and do a little shopping. She is supposed to meet her husband for lunch in an hour, but a chance encounter with a stranger changes everything. When Didi does not show up, Richard Wood first gets worried, then anxious, then frantic. And with good reason. His pregnant wife seems to have vanished off the face of the earth.

As the FBI joins Richard in a desperate search for his wife and unborn child, Didi’s terrifying eleven-hour ride takes her to the brink of all endurance and puts her on a collision course with fate itself.
