= George Kringelbach =

Danish writer

- Born: Georg Kringelbach; 16 June 1927; Vodroffsplads 12, Copenhagen, Denmark
- Died: 11 May 1979 (aged 51)
- Occupations: Journalist and Gastronome
- Known for: Journalism and books on gastronomy
- Spouses: Else Ida née Sørensen (married 1948 - 1952); Gerda née Ullmann (married 1953 - 1960); Aase née Zachariassen (married 1960 - 19??)

Signature
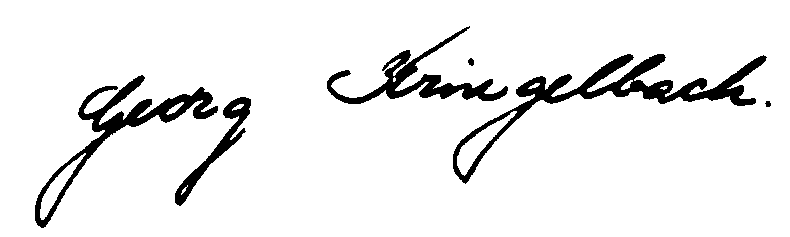

George Kringelbach (16 June 1927 – 11 May 1979) was a Danish journalist and gastronome.

== Biography ==
=== Family history ===
Kringelbach died 11 May 1979, aged 51, and is buried in Søllerød Cemetery.

=== Career ===
After training with Harlang & Toksvig as a copywriter, he was employed by Svendborg Avis in 1945, by Horsens Folkeblad in 1947, and by the press office of the Danish Liberal Party in 1950. From 1954, he worked freelance before being taken on by Dagens Nyheder in 1959. After working as a correspondent in France and Spain, he returned to Denmark in 1963 where he worked for Danmarks Radio's P3 radio programme. He became famous for hypnotising listeners to give up smoking.

On 10 October 1963 Kringelbach revealed in his radio programme Natredaktionen on P3 that Sven Hassel in reality was a pen name for the convicted traitor Børge Willy Redsted Pedersen.

From April 1965, he was employed by Ekstra Bladet and in his later years he worked as the food editor for Politiken.

== Bibliography (selected) ==
- Kringelbach, George (1960). Vi laver gode ting til hjemmet (in Danish). Gjellerup.
- Kringelbach, George (1971). Forfatterne går til bords (in Danish). Erichsen. ISBN 87-555-0100-1.
- Kringelbach, George (1973). Kringelbachs salte- og røgebog (in Danish). illus. Alex Secher. Erichsen. ISBN 87-555-0241-5.
- Kringelbach, George (1975). Kringelbachs vejviser = Where to eat in Denmark = Wo zu essen in Dänemark (in Danish, English, and German). Chr. Erichsen. ISBN 87-555-0398-5.
