= Ion Ivanovici =

Romanian conductor and composer

Ion Ivanovici Јован Ивановић
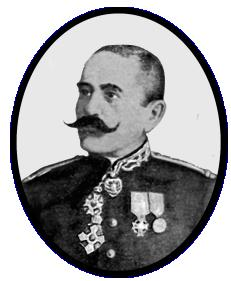
- Born: 1845; Temesvár, Kingdom of Hungary, Austrian Empire
- Died: 28 September 1902 (aged 56–57); Bucharest, Kingdom of Romania
- Military career
- Allegiance: Kingdom of Romania
- Branch: Romanian Land Forces
- Rank: General inspector

Ion Ivanovici (Serbian Cyrillic: Јован Ивановић) (alternatively: Jovan Ivanović, Iosif Ivanovici, Josef Ivanovich) (1845 – 28 September [O.S. 15 September] 1902) was a Romanian military band conductor and composer of Banat Serbian origin, best remembered today for his waltz Waves of the Danube.

== Biography ==
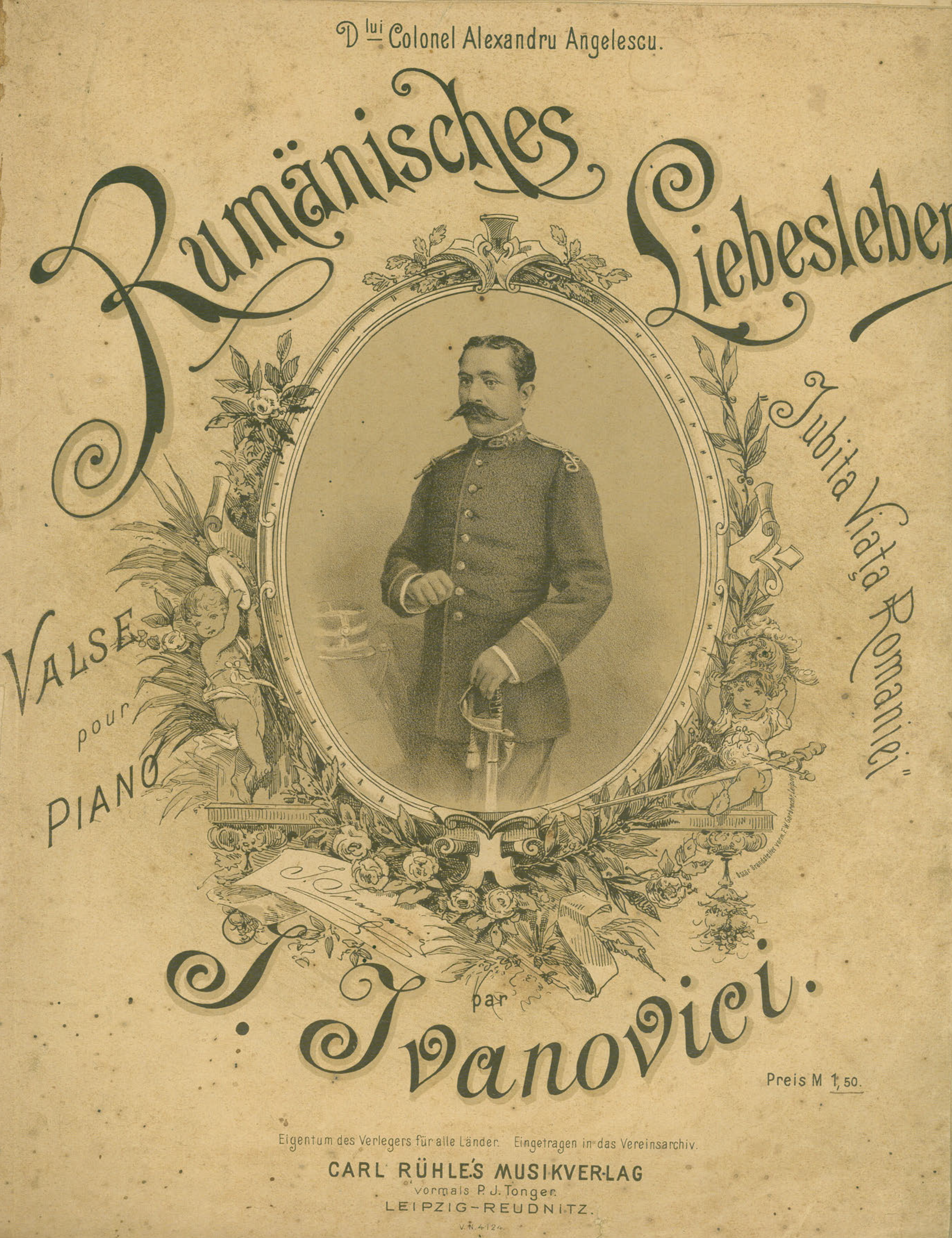
Cover page of sheet music to Ivanovici's Romanian Heart Waltz, 1890

Ivanovici was born in Temesvár, Kingdom of Hungary, Austrian Empire (today Timișoara, Romania). His interest in music began after he learned to play a flute given to him when he was a child.

Ivanovici moved to and lived most of his life in Galați in the Kingdom of Romania. Reaching the rank of officer in the Romanian army, his interest in military music culminates during his appointment as general inspector of military music in 1900. In 1901 he settled in Bucharest where he died a year later.

Although today Ivanovici is chiefly remembered for his waltz "Waves of the Danube" ("Donauwellen" in German, "Flots du Danube", in French), in his lifetime he composed over 300 works (many of them lost today). Other notable compositions are Carol I March, dedicated to King Carol of Romania, "Carmen Sylva" waltz, dedicated to Queen Elisabeth of Romania, and "Romanian heart" waltz op 51 ("Inimă română" in Romanian, "Cordialité roumaine" in French).

His works were published by over sixty publishing houses throughout the world. In 1889, Ivanovici won the coveted march prize to mark the World Exhibition in Paris, out of 116 entries.

His great-grandson Andrei Ivanovitch is a successful international classical pianist.

== Compositions ==
- Alexandru Marș (Roi de Serbie Marche)
- Souvenir Moskau (Souvenir from Moscow) Waltz
- Erzherzog Carl Ludwig March, Op. 129
- La Serenade
- The Daughter of the Boatman, or Schiffers Tochterlein (La Fille du Marin)
- Seufzer Waltz (Sigh Waltz)
- Sinaia Waltz
- Szerenade Zigeuneren (Gypsy Serenade)
- Carmen Sylva Waltz from 1892
- Mariana Polka
- Romania's Heart Waltz, Op. 51
- Incognito Waltz
- Abschied von Focșani March (Farewell to Focsani March)
- Vision de l'Orient Waltz (Vision of the East), Op. 147
- Meteor Waltz
- Im Mondenglanz Waltz (Moonglow Waltz), Op. 122
- Magic of the Mountains Waltz
- Liebes Klange Polka (Love of Music Polka)
- Storm Galopp
- Wild Flowers Waltz
- Abendtraume Polka-Mazurka (Evening Dream Polka-Mazurka)
- Agatha Waltz
- Der Liebesbote Waltz (Messenger of Love Waltz), Op. 136
- Easy, like a Dream, also known as Legere, comme un reve in French and Leicht, wie der Traum in German
- Poker Polka, Op. 123
- Am Hofe der Czarin Waltz (In the Courts of the Princess Waltz), Op. 124
- Die Ballkönigin Waltz (King of the Ball Waltz), Op. 127
- Goldene Stunden Waltz (Golden Hours Waltz), Op. 128 from 1893
- Céline Polka-Mazurka, Op. 130
- Natalia Waltz, Op. 134
- Beim Pfanderspiel Polka, Op. 137
- Bluthenzauber Waltz, Op. 149
- Lieb' um Liebe Waltz (Love for Love Waltz), Op. 155
- Alina Waltz
- Amalia Waltz
- Life in Cyprus
- Souvenir de Brăila Quadrille
- Aurel Waltz
- Cleopatra Waltz
- Elena Polka-Mazurka
- Farmecul Peleșului
- Fata pescarului
- Frumoasa româncă Waltz
- Frumoșii ochi albaștri Song (The Beautiful Blue Eyes)
- Hora micilor dorobanți
- Herzliebchen Waltz
- Kalinderu March
- La balul curții Mazurka (The Mazurka of the Court's Ball)
- Luceafărul Waltz ("Luceafăr" is the popular name of the Venus star in Romanian)
- Military March
- Marșul Carol
- L'Odalisque Polka-Mazurka
- Pe Dunăre Mazurka (On the Danube Mazurka)
- Plăcerea balului Mazurka (The Pleasure of the Ball Mazurka)
- Porumbeii albi (The White Doves)
- Die Konigin des Morgens or The Queen of the Morning
- Rosina Polka from 1902
- Sârba moților ("Sârba" is a traditional dance, "moți" are peasants of Maramureș region)
- Suvenire Quadrille
- Maus Polka or Mouse Polka
- Tatiana Waltz
- Roses from the Orient Waltz
- Viața la București Waltz (Life in Bucharest Waltz)
- Visuri de aur Waltz (Golden Dreams Waltz)
- Zâna Dunării (The Fairy of The Danube)
- Bavarian Ländler
- Kaiserreise or Voyage Imperial March
- La Bella Roumaine Waltz from 1901
- Valurile Dunării
