= Sven Hassel =

Danish writer (1917–2012)

- Born: Børge Willy Redsted Pedersen; 19 April 1917; Nyhuse, Frederiksborg County, Denmark
- Died: 21 September 2012 (aged 95); Barcelona, Spain
- Occupation: Author
- Spouse: Laura Dorthea Guldbæk Jensen (m. 1951)
- Children: Michael Hasse Arbing
- Writing career
- Pen name: Sven Hazel
- Period: 1953–2012
- Genre: World War II
- Notable works: The Legion of the Damned (1953); Wheels of Terror (1958); Comrades of War (1960); SS-General (1960); March Battalion (1962); Assignment Gestapo (1963); Monte Cassino (1963); Liquidate Paris (1967); Reign of Hell (1971); Blitzfreeze (1973); Court Martial (1978); O.G.P.U. Prison (1981); The Bloody Road to Death (1983); The Commissar (1984)
- Website: www.svenhassel.net

Sven Hassel was the pen name of the Danish-born Børge Willy Redsted Pedersen (19 April 1917 – 21 September 2012) known for his bestselling novels about German soldiers fighting in World War II. In Denmark he used the pen name Sven Hazel. He is one of the bestselling Danish authors, possibly second only to Hans Christian Andersen.

Hassel claimed his authorship was based on being a veteran of the German Wehrmacht who had fought in the Battle of Berlin in 1945 until he surrendered to the Soviets. However, numerous post-war investigations have proven him to be a military impostor with false claims and outright fabrications. In fact, Hassel (as Pedersen) was a Danish criminal who did join the German Army but was incarcerated for having lied about his convictions. He was not captured in Berlin, because he was in prison in Denmark. In the post-war period he gave a false testament which led to the arrest and imprisonment of innocent people.

== Biographical details ==
Hassel claimed that at the age of 14 he joined the merchant navy as a cabin boy and worked on ships until his military service in 1936. He said that he then joined the German Army and served in tank units during World War II.

He claimed to have surrendered to Soviet troops in Berlin in 1945 and to have spent the following years in prisoner-of-war camps in various countries. Independent sources state that he was arrested in Denmark in 1945 after the liberation and was held in prison there, first as a suspect and then as a convicted criminal. Hassel was released from prison in 1949 after having served four years out of his ten-year prison sentence.

After his release, Hassel claimed he planned to join the French Foreign Legion until he met his future wife. He and Laura Dorthea Guldbæk Jensen, a divorced film translator from Nørre Tranders who was four years his senior, married in Copenhagen in January 1951.

In 1964, he moved to Barcelona, Spain, where he lived until his death.

== WWII author ==
In 1953 his debut novel Legion of the Damned was published under the pen name Sven Hazel by Grafisk Forlag after their consultant Georgjedde (Georg Gjedde-Simonsen) had abbreviated and rewritten the manuscript.

Hassel's books are written in the first person, with Hassel himself as a character, though not necessarily the lead character. The books describe the exploits of a 27th (Penal) Panzer Regiment composed of expendable soldiers – sentenced criminals, court-martialed soldiers and political undesirables. In addition to Sven, they include Alfred Kalb, "Legionnaire" (ex-member of the French Foreign Legion); Wolfgang Creutzfeldt, a giant of a man ironically named Tiny (variously Little John in some of the books); barracks fixer and shrewd thief Joseph Porta; older sergeant Willie Beier, "Old Un" or "Old Man"; Julius Heide, a Nazi fanatic, Barcelona Blom, a veteran of both sides of the Spanish Civil War, Gregor Martin, who was a removals man before the war, Chief Mechanic Wolf, and Staff Sergeant Hoffman, a non-commissioned officer. They serve on many fronts, including northern Finland, USSR, Italy (Monte Cassino), Greece (The Bloody Road to Death), the Balkans, and France (Liquidate Paris, set during and after the Normandy Invasion). Most of the action occurs in the USSR. Due to errors in chronology, the regiment fights in several places, hundreds of kilometres apart, at the same time. In some of the books the 27th Regiment does guard duty for the Gestapo in Hamburg (Assignment Gestapo) and also at the military prison at Torgau (March Battalion).

Hassel claimed that, while his novels were essentially works of fiction, his characters were based on real people and some events were related to historical events. His view of war is brutal. In his books, soldiers fight only to survive, with the Geneva Convention rarely being observed on the Eastern front. People are killed by chance or with very little reason. Occasional pleasant events and peaceful meetings are brutally cut short. Unsympathetic Prussian officers constantly threaten their men with courts-martial and execute them with little provocation. Disgruntled soldiers occasionally kill their own officers to get rid of them. By graphically portraying war as violent and hopeless in such manner, Hassel's books have been said to contain an anti-war message.

In total he published 14 novels which have been translated into 18 languages. In 1987 his book Wheels of Terror was made into a film of the same title and also known as The Misfit Brigade.

Hassel's books are particularly popular in the United Kingdom, where he sold 15 million of the 53 million sold worldwide. In contrast his books are not deemed suitable for the public libraries in his home country Denmark where a 2011 opinion piece on literature in Dagbladet Information described Hassel as a traitor and his debut novel as the worst book ever with its characters plagiarized from All Quiet on the Western Front.

=== Works ===
English titles:

- The Legion of the Damned (1953)
- Wheels of Terror (1958)
- Comrades of War (1960)
- SS-General (1960)
- March Battalion (1962)
- Assignment Gestapo (1963)
- Monte Cassino (1963)
- Liquidate Paris (1967)
- Reign of Hell (1971)
- Blitzfreeze (1973)
- Court Martial (1978)
- O.G.P.U. Prison (1981)
- The Bloody Road to Death (1983)
- The Commissar (1984)

== Børge Willy Redsted Pedersen ==
=== Documentary evidence ===
On 23 August 1942 the resistance newspaper De Frie Danske reported that on 13 August a Cadillac registered to DNSAP leader Frits Clausen had crashed in Copenhagen. A "Børge Petersen" involved in the crash first disappeared but was later apprehended and awaited trial. DNSAP subsequently issued a statement that due to his prior convictions Børge Petersen was not and could never be a member of DNSAP. De Frie Danske opined that if this statement were true there would hardly be any members at all in DNSAP. The author Erik Haaest claimed that the criminal record of Børge Willy Redsted Pedersen shows that he was the aforementioned "Børge Petersen" and that he in connection with the car crash impersonated a police officer and that he was living at Høffdingsvej 21 with his parents. Haaest's implication is that Pedersen's claim that he was a naturalized German citizen fighting with the German armed forces is contradicted by his arrest in Copenhagen as a civilian with several prior convictions.

=== Danish investigations ===
On 10 October 1963 journalist George Kringelbach revealed in his radio programme Natredaktionen on P3 that Sven Hazel was a pen name for the convicted traitor Børge Willy Redsted Pedersen. Further, Kringelbach claimed that while Pedersen might have been in Germany during the war, it was not in a penal battalion. Rather, during the war he had been working for a German intelligence agency which collaborated with HIPO. Hassel's publisher Grafisk Forlag subsequently offered all book dealers a refund for his most recent book and ceased collaboration with him. Pedersen therefore formed his own publishing company Bellum (Latin for 'War'), which published the remainder of his books.

The controversial Danish writer Erik Haaest disputed Hassel's claims for many years. According to Haaest, the author never served on the Eastern front but spent the majority of World War II in occupied Denmark and his knowledge of warfare comes second-hand from Danish Waffen-SS veterans whom he met after the end of the war. Haaest claims that during the war period, Hassel was in fact a member of the HIPO Corps or Hilfspolizei, an auxiliary Danish police force created by the Gestapo, consisting of collaborators. Haaest also alleges that Hassel's first novel was ghostwritten and that, when it became a success, he employed his wife to write the rest of his books.

In 1976 Hassel threatened Haaest with a lawsuit for defamation in reaction to Haasts' publication of the book Hazel. En Hitler-agents fantastiske historie (Danish for 'Hazel. A Hitler agent's fantastic story'). A review of Haaest's book quotes Hassel's own statements and writes that his sentence of 10 years prison for treason was given primarily because he was an informant for the German occupation force in Denmark and argues that he could not both have been an informant in Copenhagen and been fighting deep inside Soviet territory.

=== Fraud exposed ===
In 2010 the Danish public service television channel DR2 dedicated one of its five episodes on scandals in Denmark to Hassel. The program explained that he at first was wildly popular among his Danish readers and celebrated as a Danish Ernest Hemingway, until in 1963 he was exposed as a fraud with a dubious wartime past. He became an outcast and had go into exile to continue publishing. The national Danish Radio which aired the exposure were subsequently forced to issue a retraction after Hassel provided corroborating documentation of his wartime service. With more than 50 million books sold, he is the most sold Danish author ever but never received recognition or forgiveness.

In March 2010, Berlingske Tidende gave a detailed account of Hassel's exposure as a fraud and his post-war prison sentence. In 1963 the radio journalist George Kringelbach had participated in a reception Hassel gave to celebrate his ten years as a vastly successful writer. The reception saw participation by numerous dignitaries including ambassadors and envoys of six foreign countries. Until then the public was under the impression that Hassel was a real person and that his books were autobiographical. When during his late night radio programme Kringelbach subsequently revealed that Sven Hassel was a fictitious person and that the author was a convicted traitor, a major scandal ensued. The national radio of Denmark and Hassel reached a settlement, which at the time was seen as a retraction by the national radio. The settlement enraged Kringelbach's colleagues and Kringelbach subsequently left his employer. According to Berlingske, the settlement actually acknowledges that Hassel was affiliated with the German intelligence agency E.T., the intelligence-gathering branch of HIPO. Based on the settlement, Berlingske went on to detail the 1947 sentence of Hassel. The sentence does indeed state that Hassel served in an armoured regiment of the German Wehrmacht. However, the newspaper goes on to explain that the author Haaest in 1976 had interviewed Hassel's defence attorney, member of parliament and mayor of Copenhagen Edel Saunte. According to Haaest, Saunte had explained that in court Hassel had insisted that the charges against him should be extended with a clause that he had also served as a German soldier, although he had obviously never done that. After insisting several times, the judge ended the discussions with a statement to the effect that she could no longer bear his insistence on this nonsensical front line service, but that he would also be convicted for that, although it would not add to or detract from his prison sentence. Berlingske's account ends with a statement from Haaest, that what actually happened is still a matter of belief, as well as a statement from Hassel's son who refers to the official retraction from the national radio and said that his aging father had nothing more to add.

In 2012 the Danish World War II historian Claus Bundgård Christensen was quoted for his assertion that Hassel never served on the Eastern front and that his books are a fraud and not based on his personal experiences. The historian went on to speculate that Hassel got his information from his contacts in the German intelligence service.

During the last five years of his life Hassel acknowledged the controversy in his home country over his authorship with a statement in Danish that In Denmark Sven Hassel has been put down (I Danmark er Sven Hazel blevet rakket ned), which he compares to the worldwide sale of his books in 53 million copies.

In September 2023 another book about Børge Willy Redsted Pedersen was published by Danish former police officer Martin Q Magnussen. Den Falske Løjtnant asserts that documents about Pedersen had been stolen by an employee of the Danish national state archive and only returned by his widow in 2017. These documents include detailed court case paperwork from Pedersen's post-war prosecution (he was sentenced to 10 years and served about 2) and Pedersen's own diary. The book concludes that Pedersen had attempted to join the Waffen SS in 1941 and had been rejected because of his criminal record in Denmark (bicycle thefts, posing as an army officer - hence the title). He did successfully join the Wehrmacht in 1942 under a false name, where he did indeed serve in Ukraine in a panzer unit, and that he was indeed sent to a penal battalion for pretending to have been a veteran of the Spanish Civil War. After serving his sentence with the penal battalion he then absconded from the Wehrmacht while on leave in Copenhagen and served (under other aliases) as a guard and then in the Hipo corps, where he committed various acts of torture. After his identity was eventually discovered he managed to escape custody again but was eventually recaptured and remained imprisoned until the end of the war when he was accidentally released. The book also asserts that he was involved in various dishonest and subversive activities associated with the Danish legal follow-up to the war, which led to innocent people being prosecuted.

== Death ==
Hassel died in Barcelona on 21 September 2012, aged 95. He was survived by his son.
