= The Legion of the Damned (novel) =

Novel by Sven Hassel

First edition (publ. Grafisk)

Legion of the Damned (original Danish title: Fordømtes Legion) is the first in a series of fourteen World War II novels by Danish-born author Sven Hassel. The book covers a chronological period of a number of years, starting with the protagonist's arrest and time in German concentration camps, and ending with his being an officer and company commander on the Russian front. All of Sven Hassel's subsequent war stories, from a chronological point of view, fill in details omitted by this book.

Published in 1953, the book provides an account of life as a German soldier on the Eastern Front during World War II. The book opens with the author being tried and convicted as a deserter, and as a result being sent to a concentration camp. He spends a number of months in camps, particularly at Gross Rosen and Lenggries, where he is involved in bomb disposal and also witnesses a number of atrocities committed by the SS guards, before abruptly being "pardoned" and dispatched to a penal combat unit. There, the author meets comrades Old Man or Old Un (real name Willy Beier), prankster Joseph Porta, the massive Pluto (real name Gustav Eicken), their highly abusive commander Meier, who they later take revenge on, and student Hugo Stege.

Legion of the Damned won critical acclaim across Europe and the United States and was translated into 15 languages. It has also been optioned for a film. The book is often cited as one of the best of Hassel's novels.

== See also ==
- SS General
