= Jack M. Ilfrey =

United States Army Air Force fighter ace

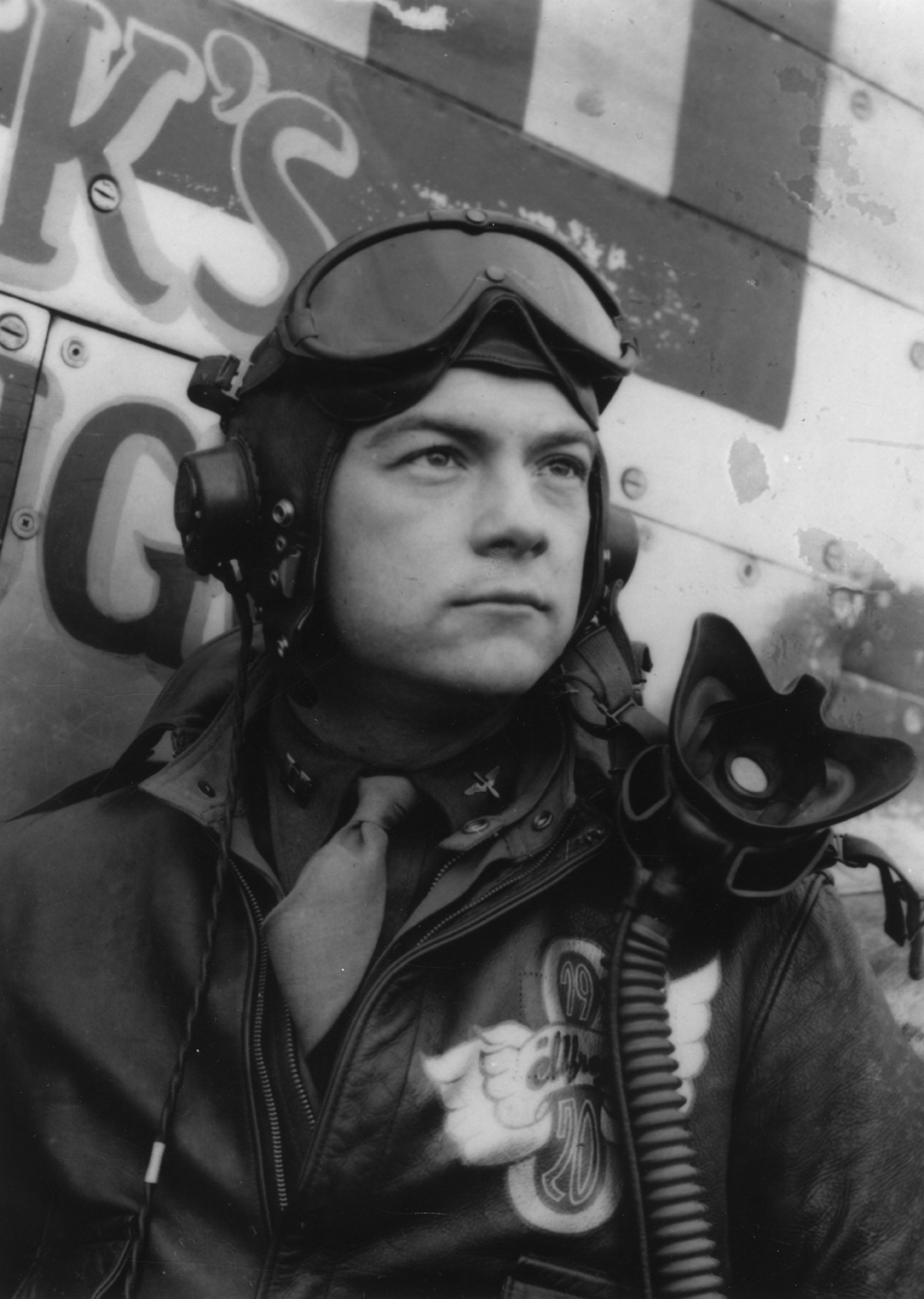
- Jack Ilfrey at RAF Kings Cliffe
- Born: July 31, 1920; Houston, Texas
- Died: October 15, 2004 (aged 84); Houston, Texas
- Burial place: Forest Park Lawndale Cemetery, Houston, Texas
- Military career
- Allegiance: United States
- Branch: United States Army Air Forces
- Service years: 1941–1945
- Rank: Major
- Nickname: "Happy Jack"
- Service number: O-431223
- Units: 94th Fighter Squadron, 1st Fighter Group; 79th Fighter Squadron, 20th Fighter Group
- Commands: 79th Fighter Squadron
- Awards: Silver Star Medal; Distinguished Flying Cross (5); Air Medal (13); American Defense Service Medal; American Campaign Medal; European-African-Middle Eastern Campaign Medal (4 battle stars); World War II Victory Medal

Jack Milton Ilfrey (July 31, 1920 – October 15, 2004) was a United States Army Air Forces fighter ace who was credited with shooting down seven and a half enemy aircraft during World War II and evading capture twice. Ilfrey was known as Happy Jack for his cheerful disposition, and his ground crews in England nicknamed each of his planes "Happy Jack's Go Buggy".

== Youth ==
Jack Milton Ilfrey was born on July 31, 1920, in Houston, Texas. He attended Mirabeau Lamar Senior High School and the University of Houston, before completing a civilian pilot training program in 1939 at Texas A&M University. He joined the United States Army Air Corps in April 1941 as an aviation cadet, and graduated on December 12, 1941, in Class 41-I at Luke Field, Arizona, being commissioned as a second lieutenant.

== Entry into the war and combat in North Africa ==
Ilfrey was first assigned to the 94th Fighter Squadron, 1st Fighter Group, equipped with the Lockheed P-38 Lightning. His unit moved from California to Maine in early 1942 in preparation for Operation Bolero, the United States Army Air Forces' movement to England. The 1st Fighter Group was then transferred to North Africa after Operation Torch in November 1942. On November 15, 1942, he was on a ferry flight from England to North Africa when one of the drop tanks on his P-38 malfunctioned and he ran low on fuel. He landed at an airfield in Portugal, and was informed, as Portugal was a neutral country, that he would be interned for the duration of the war. Ilfrey managed to convince the Portuguese to refuel his plane, and when a major asked to inspect it, Ilfrey agreed. Ilfrey was seated in the cockpit showing him the controls when he suddenly pushed the throttles forward, knocking the major off the wing and roaring down the runway. Ilfrey landed in Gibraltar, and then flew to North Africa. He was berated by his commanding officer for nearly causing an international incident, but the commander of the Twelfth Air Force General Jimmy Doolittle, stepped in on his behalf. He flew P-38F-1-LO, serial number 41-7587, nicknamed "Texas Terror" (left tail boom)/"The Mad Dash" (right tail boom). He scored five and a half aerial victories and damaged two enemy aircraft, becoming what many believe to be one of the first, if not the first, pilot to reach "ace" status while flying a P-38. Ernie Pyle included an interview with Ilfrey in his book about the North African campaign. During 1943, he was sent back to the United States to become a P-38 instructor in California. He completed 72 combat missions and 208 flying hours with the 1st Fighter Group. He was promoted to captain on April 5, 1943.

== War in Europe ==
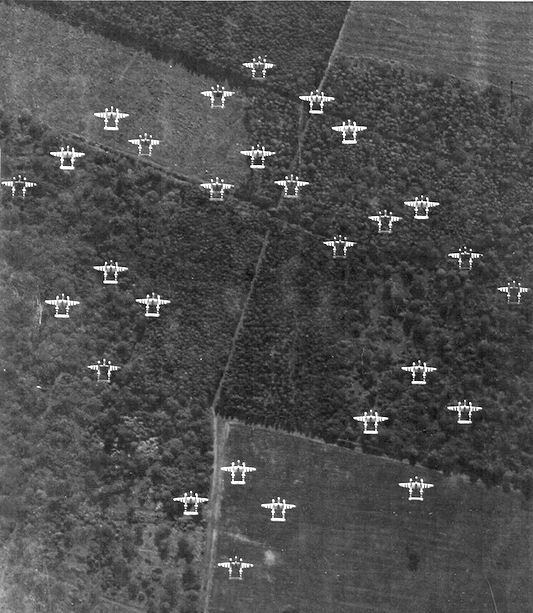
20th Fighter Group P-38 Lightnings in June 1944

In the spring of 1944, he was posted as squadron commander of the 79th Fighter Squadron of the 20th Fighter Group, the famous "Loco Busters", where Ilfrey was known for his fearlessness. He flew a P-38J-15-LO, serial number 43-28431, nicknamed "Happy Jack's Go Buggy". On May 24, 1944, he scored two more confirmed aerial victories on a mission over Berlin, Germany; one of them by ramming. A Messerschmitt Bf 109 collided with the right wing of Ilfrey's P-38 during aerial combat maneuvers, tearing off four to five feet of the wing tip; the German plane crashed, but Ilfrey managed to return to base in England. On June 13, 1944, after attacking the La Possonniere (Maine-et-Loire) railway bridge, he saw a locomotive at the Lion-d'Angers station. While attacking this objective, his aircraft was hit by anti-aircraft artillery fire. One of his engines caught fire and he parachuted, landing heavily on a farm building, his parachute having opened too low. Ilfrey was deep behind enemy lines. He was taken in by a friendly French family, who gave him shelter, food, a bicycle, and false identity papers as a deaf-mute farmer named "Jacques Robert". He eventually reached the Allied front line, and on June 20, 1944, he was back in England.

After his escape, instead of being returned to the United States as most other evaders were (to prevent the enemy from extracting valuable information about resistance networks from them if they were captured again), Ilfrey returned to the 79th Fighter Squadron which was converting to P-51 Mustangs. He flew P-51D-5-NA 44-13761, obligatorily nicknamed "Happy Jack's Go Buggy". In early December 1944, his tour ended and he returned to the United States. He completed 70 combat missions and 320 flying hours with the 20th Fighter Group. Ilfrey spent the rest of the war in a staff position on the Pacific coast. He was discharged on December 28, 1945, with the rank of major. His final tally was seven and a half confirmed aerial victories, with two enemy aircraft damaged.

== Aerial victory credits ==
Date	#	Type	Location	Aircraft flown	Unit Assigned
November 29, 1942	0.5 destroyed	Messerschmitt Bf 110	Tunisia	P-38F	94 FS, 1 FG
December 2, 1942	2 destroyed	Messerschmitt Bf 109	Gabès, Tunisia	P-38F	94 FS, 1 FG
December 26, 1942	2 destroyed	Focke-Wulf Fw 190	Bizerte, Tunisia	P-38F	94 FS, 1 FG
January 11, 1943	1 damaged	Bf 109	Gabès, Tunisia	P-38F	94 FS, 1 FG
March 3, 1943	1 destroyed	Fw 190	Tunis, Tunisia	P-38F	94 FS, 1 FG
March 4, 1943	1 damaged	Bf 109	Bizerte, Tunisia	P-38F	94 FS, 1 FG
May 24, 1944	2 destroyed	Bf 109	Berlin, Germany	P-38J	79 FS, 20 FG

== Post war ==
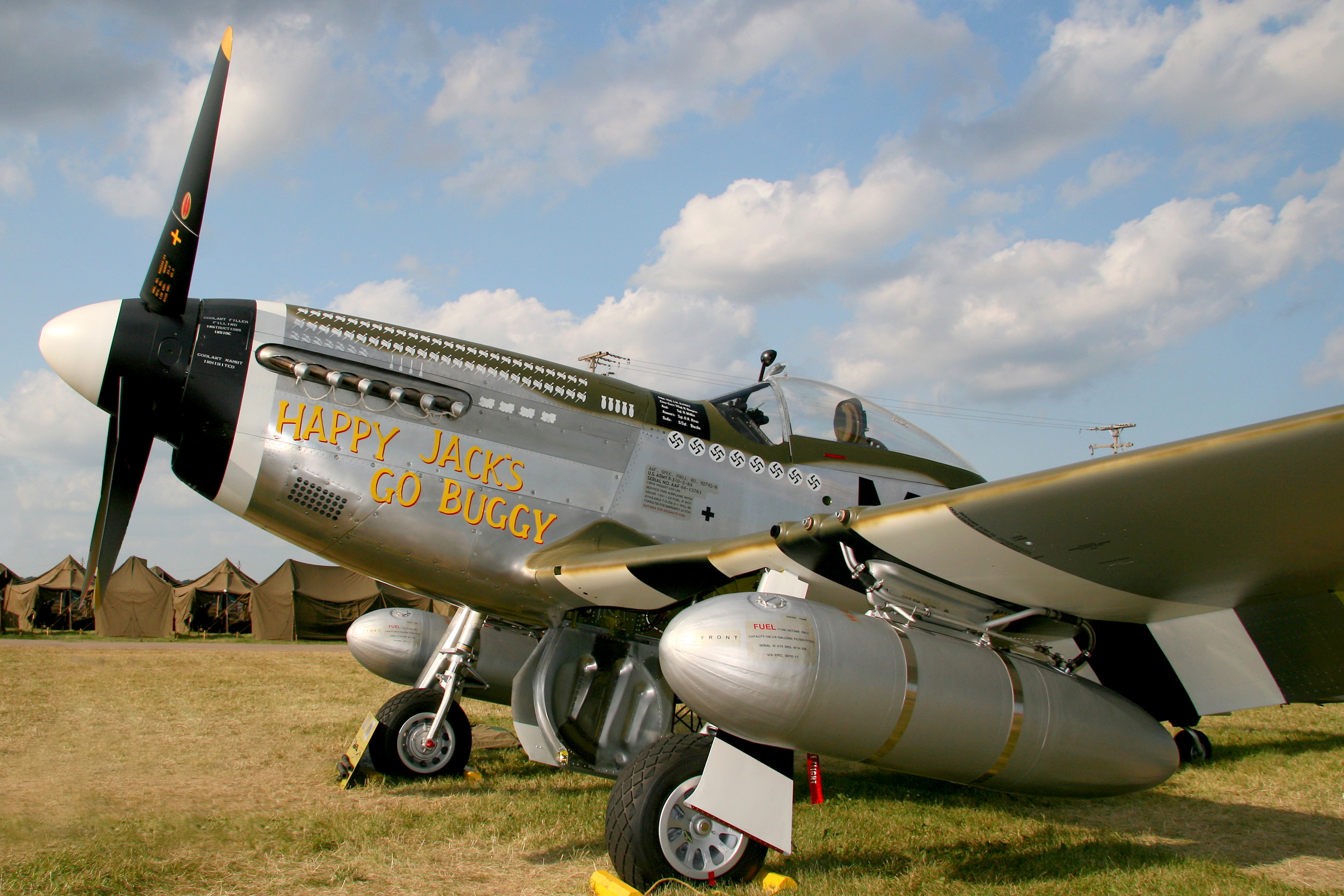
P-51 Mustang restored as "Happy Jack's Go Buggy" in 2008

After the war, Ilfrey briefly entered commercial aviation. He later lived in San Antonio, Texas, working for the Alamo National Bank, where he retired after 30 years. He died on October 15, 2004, in Houston, Texas, at the age of 84. He was buried in Forest Park Lawndale Cemetery. In 2008, Midwest Aero Restorations Ltd. finished work on P-51D-30-NA serial number 44-74452, returning it to airworthy status and marking it as Ilfrey's "Happy Jack's Go Buggy".

== See also ==
- List of World War II flying aces
