= Paullina Simons =

American novelist

- Born: 1963 (age 62–63); Leningrad, Russian Soviet Federative Socialist Republic
- Education: University of Kansas
- Occupation: Novelist
- Writing career
- Period: 1994–present
- Genres: Romance, historical fiction
- Notable work: The Bronze Horseman series
- Website: www.paullinasimons.com

Paullina Simons (born 1963) is a Russian-born American writer and the international best-selling author of the novels Tully, Red Leaves, Eleven Hours, The Bronze Horseman, Tatiana and Alexander, Lily and The Summer Garden.

== Background ==
Simons dreamed of becoming a writer as a child in Leningrad. At the age of ten, she moved with her family to the United States, and completed an early attempt at writing when she was 12, in English.

Simons attended colleges in New York, Kansas and England, graduating from the University of Kansas with a degree in political science. She worked as a financial journalist on the Financial News Network and translator among other various jobs before Tully, her first novel, was written and released.

Simons and her second husband Kevin Ryan live in Long Island, New York and have four children. From oldest to youngest they are Natasha, Misha, Kevin Jr., and Tatiana (named after the heroine in The Bronze Horseman).

== Publications ==
Although her most well known book is The Bronze Horseman, many of Simons's novels have reached international bestseller lists in countries including Australia and New Zealand. All of her books have been published with Flamingo or HarperCollins

=== The Bronze Horseman trilogy ===
1. The Bronze Horseman (2000)
  It follows the Metanov family as they try to survive the siege of Leningrad, and the relationship that forms between the youngest, Tatiana Metanova, and a Red Army officer called Alexander Belov.
2. Tatiana and Alexander also known as The Bridge to Holy Cross (2003)
  Tatiana has left the Soviet Union, and has left Alexander behind, who now awaits trial, and most probably, execution. As she tries to build a new life in America, she is haunted by the possibility that Alexander might still be alive.
3. The Summer Garden (2005)
  Tatiana and Alexander have suffered the worst that the twentieth century had to offer. But now, reunited after years apart, they must learn how to live together. And as dark forces threaten to tear their family apart, they must protect their son from the ghosts of the past.
- Tatiana's Table (2007).
  A collection of recipes for meals mentioned in The Bronze Horseman, The Bridge To Holy Cross/Tatiana and Alexander and The Summer Garden. According to Simons: "I was looking to make it funny and light and cute, and am still trying to, but of course, my melancholy Russian soul is getting the better of me as I remember what Tatiana and Alexander had, what they lost, what they sacrificed for each other, what it took them to get back to the metaphoric Lazarevo (which in itself was a metaphor), and suddenly I’m feeling slightly less chipper. The blockade of Leningrad in 1941 is presenting particular problems as I write with abundance about cheese and milk and butter and flour and beef tenderloin and preheating ovens and buttering casserole dishes. I keep thinking of Tatiana smelling the empty bag that once contained oatmeal when there was no electricity and no heat, no coal or wood, or water on the third floor."
- Children of Liberty (2012).
  A prequel to the original trilogy, based around the lives of Alexander's parents. Gina Attaviano travels from Sicily to Boston to start a new life, but is strongly attracted to Harold Barrington, the son of one of the richest businessmen in New England.
- Bellagrand (2014).
  Sequel to Children of Liberty.

=== Other books ===
- Tully (1994).
  "The epic tale of a girl from the wrong side of the tracks and her emergence into womanhood"
- Red Leaves (1997).
  A suspense mystery. Detective Spencer O'Malley meets young Ivy League student, Kristina Kim, and a week later is called to investigate her murder. He begins to unravel the mystery of the tangled relationships between the victim's friends - Jim, Conni and Albert, her past and her estranged family as he is sure that not everything is as it seems.
- Eleven Hours (1998).
  This thrilling multiple-POV novel revolves around the kidnapping of a pregnant woman. The scenes alternate between the threatened wife and the desperate husband, pursuing the kidnappers along with a laid-back FBI agent.
- Lily (Or The Girl In Times Square) (2004).
  A young woman's roommate disappears, and an NYPD detective (one Spencer O'Malley) enters her life. She eventually begins to question what she knows about her friend and family.
- Road to Paradise (2007).
  Shelby and Gina are off to California with different reasons. But after picking up a young hitchhicker they run into all sorts of trouble.
- A Song in the Daylight (2010).
  Larissa's life isn't as perfect as it seems to be. She isn't satisfied with her loveless marriage and her irresistible passion might make her do the unthinkable.
- Six Days in Leningrad (2013)
  A non-fiction memoir about the author's trip to St. Petersburg (Leningrad) with her father, for research before writing The Bronze Horseman trilogy.
- Lone Star (2015)
  Chloë, along with her friends, goes for a backpacking adventure across Europe before college starts. But a mysterious boy named Johnny who carries a lifetime of treacherous secrets threatens to shatter the bonds that have held four lifelong friends. The character Johnny is a relative of Tatiana and Alexander, from The Bronze Horseman series.
