= Richard L. Newhafer =

American novelist

Richard L. Newhafer (March 6, 1921—October 12, 1974) was an American novelist, teleplay writer and television director whose experience as a highly decorated veteran of World War II and the Korean War played a key role in his books and in his contribution to ABC's 1960s series Combat! and Twelve O'Clock High.

A native of Chicago, Richard Newhafer was a student at Loyola Academy, the University of Notre Dame, and DePaul University. In his early twenties at the start of World War II, he became a Naval Aviator, took part in extensive military operations and was credited with downing three Japanese planes and participated in sinking the battleship Ise. During the Korean War, he again served in the navy and, in 1954–55, he was public affairs officer of the Blue Angels, the Navy's prestigious flight demonstration team. When television producer Samuel Gallu requested a technical advisor for The Blue Angels, his 1960 syndicated series portraying the team's fictional exploits, The Pentagon assigned Richard Newhafer.

Having earned over thirty medals, decorations and citations, Newhafer resigned from the Navy and remained in Hollywood, becoming a writer of war novels and teleplays and subsequently directing a number of episodes for the 1964-67 World War II series Twelve O'Clock High. Among his books were The Last Tallyho (1964, G. P. Putnam's Sons), No More Bugles in the Sky (1966, New American Library), The Violators (1967, New American Library), The Golden Jungle (1968), On the Wings of the Storm (1969, William Morrow and Company) and Seven Days to Glory (1973). He also authored stories which were published in men's action magazines such as Flying and Air Navy and, in his final years, expanded into the detective genre, writing episodes for the early seasons of CBS' Cannon, a 1971–76 series which, following Twelve O'Clock High, continued his association with Quinn Martin Productions.
