= The Bronze Horseman (novel) =

2000 novel by Paullina Simons

- First edition (UK)
- Author: Paullina Simons
- Language: English
- Series: The Bronze Horseman Trilogy
- Genre: Romance, historical novel, war novel
- Publisher: HarperCollins
- Publication date: 2000
- Publication place: United Kingdom
- Pages: 912 pp (paperback)
- ISBN: 978-0-06-103112-0 (paperback)
- Followed by: Tatiana and Alexander

The Bronze Horseman is a historical fiction novel written by Paullina Simons and the first book in the Bronze Horseman Trilogy.

The book begins on 22 June 1941, the day that Germany invaded the Soviet Union in the Second World War after Operation Barbarossa. Tatiana Metanova, nearly seventeen, meets the handsome and mysterious Red Army officer Alexander Belov. The relationship between Tatiana and Alexander develops against the backdrop of the Siege of Leningrad and in the face of many difficulties.

== Synopsis ==
Tatiana Metanova wakes up on 22 June 1941, the day before her 17th birthday, to her older sister Dasha coming home and declaring that she is in love. That same morning, Vyacheslav Molotov announces Germany has invaded the Soviet Union. Tatiana's parents send her twin brother Pasha to a boys' camp so that the army won't draft him. Tatiana, who is young and naive, is excited by the war. While her family focuses on sending Pasha safely away, Tatiana is entrusted with buying food and supplies. Unable to find much to buy, she buys a scoop of ice-cream, causing her to miss her bus. While waiting for the next bus, she notices a red army officer watching her, and he eventually crosses the street and introduces himself as lieutenant Alexander Belov.

After an embarrassed introduction, Alexander and Tatiana become attracted to one another and he helps her buy food at the Officers' store. Alexander's irritating friend Dimitri insists on helping them carry the boxes home. When they arrive at Tatiana's apartment, they discover he is the man Dasha has fallen in love with. Tatiana is disappointed but doesn't want to come between him and her sister. However, Alexander visits her the following day, meeting her outside of the Kirov factory where she works. After a few weeks of walking her home, Alexander and Tatiana's attraction is undeniable. Still, Tatiana begs Alexander to stay with Dasha and not break her sister's heart. Alexander and Tatiana's bond grows deeper as Alexander tells her he is an American who emigrated with his parents, now dead, in 1930. After a few weeks, Alexander, who is annoyed at Tatiana's unwillingness to fight for him, breaks up with Dasha and stops visiting the Metanovs and Tatiana.

The Metanovs are heartbroken over Pasha, as they cannot get through to the camp and hear reports it has been under fire. Tatiana overhears her parents saying that they would have preferred to lose Tania and decides to volunteer at the front in order to find Pasha and bring him home. When she arrives at the Luga front, the boy's camp is empty. Tatiana takes refuge in a building that is bombed and is seriously injured. Dasha asks Alexander to find her, and he takes Tatiana back to Leningrad, sharing their first kiss on the way.

In Leningrad, it becomes clear that Alexander cannot stay away, but Tatiana refuses to tell Dasha about their relationship. A drunk Alexander visits Tatiana in her hospital room one night, and they become more intimate. Alexander tells Tatiana about his parents and how he came to live under a false name – and that Dimitri is aware of his true identity. Tatiana's grandparents evacuate to Molotov, but Tatiana is unable to travel because of her broken leg, meaning that she, Dasha, and her parents are trapped in the city during the Siege of Leningrad.

The scarcity of food and the harsh winter kill numerous people, including most of the Metanovs. Dasha, after months of being oblivious, reveals to Tatiana that she is aware of the relationship between her and Alexander. Ultimately, with only Dasha and Tatiana still alive and both in poor health, Alexander finds a convoy to evacuate the sisters out of Leningrad. In order to keep his promise to Tatiana not to hurt Dasha, Alexander agrees to Dasha's demand to tell her that he has loved Dasha and never Tatiana. After Dasha and Tatiana make the trip safely to Kobona, Dasha dies of consumption. Tatiana buries her sister in an ice hole and travels to Lazarevo to find her grandparents.

Months later Alexander is worried about Tatiana and Dasha, having received no word from them. After receiving a month's furlough, he travels to Lazarevo, where he finds Tatiana, learns of Dasha's fate, and finds out that Tatiana had lost both her grandparents and was recovering from tuberculosis and pneumonia. Tatiana is distrustful and eventually reveals during an argument that she was not sure if he really loved her or Dasha. Alexander and Tatiana make up and later make love for the first time. The next morning, Alexander asks her to marry him, and they do so on her 18th birthday. They spend a month together in a cabin in the woods near Lazarevo, before Alexander must return to the front.

Tatiana, worried after not hearing from Alexander, goes back to Leningrad to find him. After finding out that he is safe, she stays and works as a nurse at Grechesky Hospital in Leningrad, wanting to stay near him. Alexander is upset and tries to dissuade her but fails. He returns to the front, threatened by the possibility that Dimitri might find about his secret marriage to Tatiana and turn him in to the NKVD in revenge.

Alexander, by now promoted to major, is injured on the front while trying to save Dr. Matthew Sayers, an American Red Cross doctor with whom Tatiana has been working. Tatiana convinces the doctor to operate on him and donates blood to save Alexander, considered a hopeless case. She triumphs and Alexander lives; for his actions, he receives the Hero of the Soviet Union medal. Tatiana then asks Sayers to help them leave the Soviet Union, with her posing as a Red Cross nurse and Alexander as a Finnish POW. Alexander is concerned about the dangers of this plan, especially after finding out that she is pregnant.

Dimitri visits Alexander as he convalesces and reveals that he knows about the marriage; he threatens to tell the NKVD about Alexander's past if he does not allow Dimitri to flee the Soviet Union with them. Dimitri later demands that Tatiana be left behind, ostensibly because she might slow them down, but in fact to drive the couple apart. Alexander refuses and loses his temper, punching Dimitri and almost killing him before hospital staff intervene. Aware that his arrest is imminent, and in a desperate attempt to save Tatiana, he begs Sayers to tell her he has died while being transported to be promoted to lieutenant colonel, so that she would leave without him. Alexander says a final goodbye to the unaware Tatiana, telling her to 'remember Orbeli'.

After Dr. Sayers tells Tatiana of Alexander's supposed fate, Tatiana refuses to believe it, but is eventually persuaded and agrees to leave with Sayers and with Dimitri posing as the Finn. When Dimitri is recognized by the border guards, a firefight kills Dimitri and the guards on both sides of the border, while severely wounding Dr. Sayers. An injured Tatiana drives herself and the doctor to Helsinki, where he dies of his injuries. She then leaves for Stockholm, where she stays for several months before traveling by ship to America. Tatiana arrives in Ellis Island in June 1943 and goes into early labor, giving birth to a baby boy whom she names Anthony Alexander Barrington, after his father.

== Film adaptation ==
In late 2009 a film version of the book was in development with Andy Tennant as director. Production was halted, though the author's script was finished. As of June 2011, the option on the book expired and was not renewed with Andy Tennant's production company due to differing ideas and thoughts about how the film script should be written. In 2012 ITA Productions bought the rights to the book, appointing Martyn Hall as producer and Sash Andranikian as director. Simons finished the film script in November 2013 and pre-production was scheduled to begin in March 2014 while production was scheduled for early July. However, in December, 2023, Simons announced that the adaptation rights had expired once more, blaming pro-Russian bias in the media as being responsible for a lack of interest.

== Sources ==
- http://www.fantasticfiction.co.uk/s/paullina-simons/bronze-horseman.htm
- http://www.shvoong.com/books/romance/1924917-bronze-horseman/
- http://www.harpercollins.com.au/book/index.aspx?isbn=9780006513223
