= Tollander Prize =

Finland-Swedish literary award

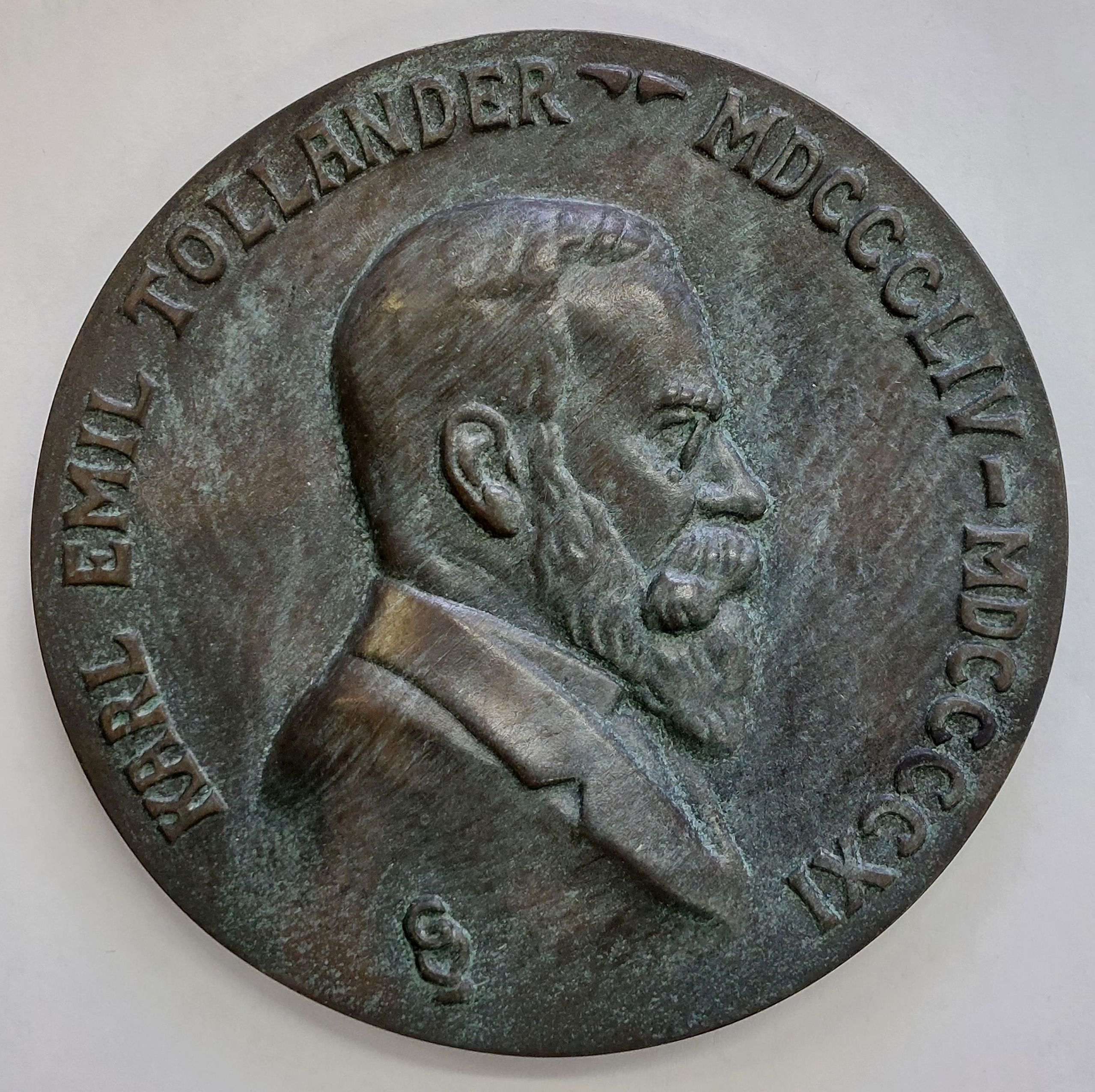
Since 1913, Tollander Prize recipients have received a medal designed by Gerda Qvist.

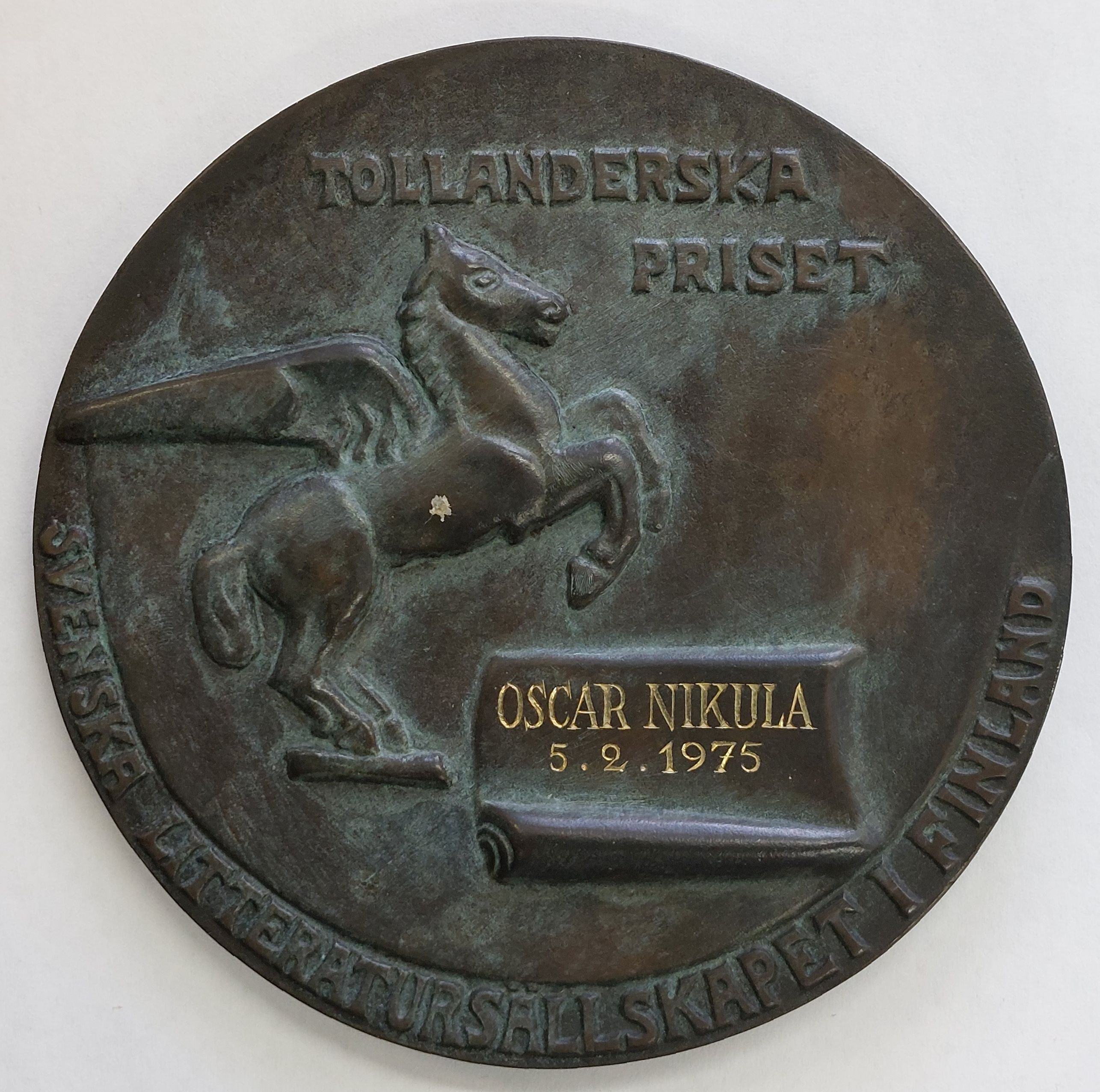
Reverse of Oscar Nikula’s 1975 medal.

The Karl Emil Tollander Prize (Swedish Karl Emil Tollanders pris), also known as Tollander Prize (Tollanderska priset), is a literary award for writers of Finland-Swedish literature. This term refers to a branch of Nordic literature based on the works of Finland-Swedish writers and poets from Finland and generally published in this country.

The prize is the most important award of its kind in so-called Svenskfinland (lit. "Sweden Finland") – the Swedish-speaking part of Finland. With a prize money of €40,000 (as of 2022) it is also the highest-endowed literary award in Finland and one of the biggest literary awards in the Nordic countries. Among the recipients are internationally renowned authors such as Märta Tikkanen, Jörn Donner, and Bo Carpelan.

The prize was first awarded in 1913 and is named after the banker Karl Emil Tollander (1854–1911). Each year on 5 February, the birthday of Finland’s national poet Johan Ludvig Runeberg (1804–1877), the Society of Swedish Literature in Finland awards the prize in recognition of the lifetime achievement of Finland-Swedish writers.

== Tollander Prize winners ==
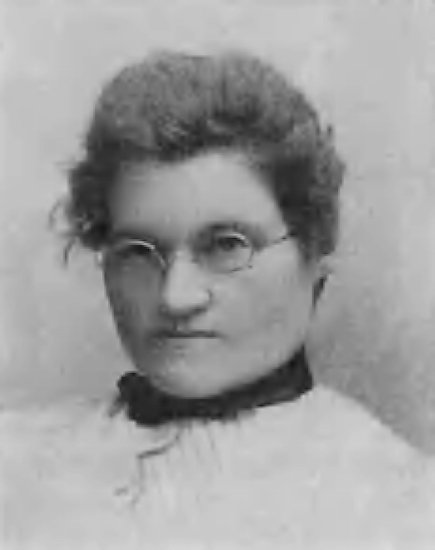
Josefina Bengts (1875–1925) was the first woman to be awarded the Tollander Prize in 1922

- 1913 Valfrid Vasenius (1848–1928), Bertel Gripenberg (1878–1947)
- 1914 Hjalmar Procopé (1889–1954), Arvid Mörne (1876–1946), Jacob Tegengren (1875–1956)
- 1915 Jacob Tegengren, John Arnold Bergh (1872–1939), Sigrid Backman (1880–1938)
- 1916 Hjalmar Procopé, Ture Janson (1886–1954), Richard Malmberg (1877–1944), Runar Schildt (1888–1925)
- 1917 Karin Smirnoff (1880–1973), Jarl Hemmer (1893–1944), Ragnar Ekelund (1892–1960), Erik Furuhjelm (1883–1964), Gabriel Sanden (1885–1933)
- 1918 Emil Zilliacus (1878–1961), Runar Schildt
- 1919 Ragnar Ekelund
- 1920 Jarl Hemmer
- 1921 Arvid Mörne
- 1922 Josefina Bengts (1875–1925)
- 1923 Ture Janson
- 1924 Wilhelm Ruuth (1854–1928)
- 1925 Sigurd Nordenstreng (1857–1935)
- 1926 Bertel Gripenberg
- 1927 Arvid Mörne
- 1928 Gabriel Rein (1869–1947)
- 1929 Arvid Mörne
- 1930 Emil Zilliacus
- 1931 Arvid Mörne
- 1932 Emil Zilliacus
- 1933 Ragnar Rudolf Eklund (1895–1946)
- 1934 Hagar Olsson (1893–1978)
- 1935 Hans Ruin (1891–1980)
- 1936 Sigurd Frosterus (1876–1956)
- 1937 Sally Salminen (1906–1976)
- 1938 Eric Anthoni (1893–1978)
- 1939 Harald Jernström (1882–1946)
- 1940 Jacob Tegengren
- 1941 Ivar Heikel (1861–1952)
- 1942 Bertel Gripenberg
- 1943 Elmer Diktonius (1896–1961)
- 1944 Ragnar Rudolf Eklund
- 1945 Bertel Hintze (1901–1969)
- 1946 Solveig von Schoultz (1907–1996)
- 1947 Olav Ahlbäck (1911–1989)
- 1948 Mirjam Tuominen (1913–1967)
- 1949 Sven Lindman (1910–1983)
- 1950 Hagar Olsson
- 1951 Eirik Hornborg (1879–1965)
- 1952 Göran Schildt (1917–2009)
- 1953 Walentin Chorell (1912–1983)
- 1954 Oscar Parland (1912–1997)
- 1955 Ole Torvalds (1916–1995)
- 1956 Göran Stenius (1909–2000)
- 1957 Åke Granlund (1914–1988)
- 1958 Bo Carpelan (1926–2011)
- 1959 Carl-Rudolf Gardberg (1898–1972)
- 1960 Axel Erik Heinrichs (1890–1965)
- 1961 Anna Bondestam (1907–1995)
- 1962 Bo Carpelan
- 1963 Oscar Parland
- 1964 Nils Erik Wickberg (1909–2002)
- 1965 Lars Huldén (1926–2016)
- 1966 Christer Kihlman (1930–2021)
- 1967 Rabbe Enckell (1903–1974)
- 1968 Birgit Klockars (1912–1996), Kurt Zilliacus (1927–2008)
- 1969 Ralf Nordgren (1936–2014)
- 1970 John Gardberg (1899–1974)
- 1971 Tove Jansson (1914–2001)
- 1972 Karin Allardt Ekelund (1895–1990)
- 1973 Olof Enckell (1900–1989)
- 1974 Tito Colliander (1904–1989)
- 1975 Oscar Nikula (1907–1996)
- 1976 Thomas Warburton (1918–2016)
- 1977 Nils Erik Wickberg
- 1978 Valdemar Nyman (1904–1998)
- 1979 Anna Bondestam
- 1980 Stig Jägerskiöld (1911–1997)
- 1981 Solveig von Schoultz
- 1982 Lorenz von Numers (1913–1994)
- 1983 Bo Carpelan
- 1984 Torsten Steinby (1908–1995)
- 1985 Johannes Salminen (1925–2015)
- 1986 Gösta Ågren (1936–2020)
- 1987 Georg Henrik von Wright (1916–2003)
- 1988 Christer Kihlman
- 1989 Johan Wrede (b. 1935)
- 1990 Peter Sandelin (1930–2019)
- 1991 Göran Schildt
- 1992 Mikael Enckell (b. 1932)
- 1993 Jan-Magnus Jansson (1922–2003)
- 1994 Claes Andersson (1937–2019)
- 1995 Lars Huldén
- 1996 Erik Allardt (1925–2020)
- 1997 Olle Sirén (1926–2015)
- 1998 Tua Forsström (b. 1947)
- 1999 Märta Tikkanen (b. 1935)
- 2000 George C. Schoolfield (1925–2016)
- 2001 Erik Kruskopf (b. 1930)
- 2002 Jörn Donner (1933–2020)
- 2003 Merete Mazzarella (b. 1945)
- 2004 Carl Jacob Gardberg
- 2005 Irmelin Sandman Lilius (b. 1936)
- 2006 Inga-Britt Wik (1930–2008)
- 2007 Johan Bargum (b. 1943)
- 2008 Klaus Törnudd (b. 1931)
- 2009 Leif Salmén (1952–2019)
- 2010 Ralf Långbacka (b. 1932)
- 2011 Ulla-Lena Lundberg (b. 1947)
- 2012 Kurt Högnäs (1931–2021)
- 2013 Rainer Knapas (b. 1946)
- 2014 Bo Lönnqvist (b. 1941)
- 2015 Birgitta Boucht (b. 1940)
- 2016 Bengt Ahlfors (b. 1937)
- 2017 Max Engman (b. 1945)
- 2018 Kjell Westö (b. 1961)
- 2019 Tuva Korsström (b. 1946)
- 2020 Monika Fagerholm (b. 1961)
- 2021 Fredrik Lång (b. 1947)
- 2022 Robert Åsbacka (b. 1961)
- 2023 Gustav Björkstrand (b. 1941)
- 2024 Ralf Andtbacka (b. 1963)
- 2025 Lars Sund (b. 1953)
- 2026 Henrik Meinander (b. 1960)
