= Swedish Academy Finland Prize =

The Finland Prize (Swedish: Finlandspriset) is a literary award presented annually by the Swedish Academy since 1966. It is awarded to somebody that has done important activities for the Swedish-speaking culture in Finland. The amount was 100,000 crowns in 2007.

== Recipients ==
- 1966 – Hagar Olsson
- 1967 – Rabbe Enckell
- 1968 – Georg Henrik von Wright
- 1969 – Tito Colliander
- 1970 – Solveig von Schoultz
- 1971 – Bo Carpelan
- 1972 – Tove Jansson
- 1973 – Rabbe Enckell
- 1974 – Olof Enckell
- 1975 – Erik Ekelund
- 1976 – Christer Kihlman
- 1977 – Olav Ahlbäck
- 1978 – Johannes Salminen
- 1979 – Erik Tawaststjerna
- 1980 – Lars Huldén
- 1981 – Göran Schildt
- 1982 – Oscar Nikula
- 1983 – Erik Stenius
- 1984 – Carl-Eric Thors
- 1985 – Erik Allardt
- 1986 – Torsten Steinby
- 1987 – Kai Laitinen
- 1988 – Claes Andersson
- 1989 – Matti Klinge
- 1990 – Ulla-Lena Lundberg
- 1991 – Johan Wrede
- 1992 – Tua Forsström
- 1993 – Jan-Magnus Jansson
- 1994 – Max Engman
- 1995 – Clas Zilliacus
- 1996 – Valdemar Nyman
- 1997 – Kari Tarkiainen
- 1998 – Mikael Enckell
- 1999 – Ralf Långbacka
- 2000 – Finsk Tidskrift
- 2001 – Thomas Warburton
- 2002 – Märta Tikkanen
- 2003 – Tuva Korsström
- 2004 – Jörn Donner
- 2005 – Peter Sandelin
- 2006 – Rainer Knapas
- 2007 – Henrik Meinander
- 2008 – Christer Kihlman
- 2009 – Nils Erik Forsgård
- 2010 – Ann Sandelin
- 2011 – Gösta Ågren
- 2012 – Pär Stenbäck
- 2013 – Gunvor Kronman
- 2014 – Michel Ekman
- 2015 – Mikael Reuter
- 2016 – Fred Karlsson
- 2017 – Paavo Lipponen
- 2018 – Kjell Westö
- 2019 – Marika Tandefelt
- 2021 – Merete Mazzarella
- 2022 – Janina Orlov
- 2023 – John Vikström
- 2024 – Gustav Björkstrand
- 2025 – Hanna Lehti-Eklund
