= Water Droplets (Sibelius) =

Earliest written musical work by Jean Sibelius

- Duo by Jean Sibelius
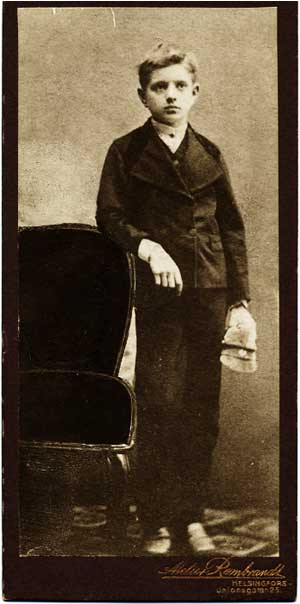
- The composer as a boy (c. 1870)
- Native name: Vattendroppar
- Catalogue: JS 216
- Composed: 1875 (or perhaps as late as 1881)
- Publisher: Fazer (1997)
- Duration: 0.75 min.

Water Droplets (in Swedish: Vattendroppar; in Finnish: Vesipisaroita; occasionally translated to English as Water Drops or Raindrops), JS 216, is a chamber piece for violin and cello pizzicato written by the Finnish composer Jean Sibelius (then called Janne) when he was a schoolboy. The "tiny piece", which is just 12 measures long, (Note: Erik Furuhjelm, in his 1916 biography of Sibelius, published Water Droplets in 2/4 time, an editorial decision that would have made the piece 24 measures long (although the book only includes the first eight). However, in 1994, Edition Fazer published Water Droplets in 4/4 time, which reduces the piece to 12 measures. This article utilizes the latter.) cannot be dated with precision, because the autograph manuscript is lost. Scholars nevertheless speculate that Sibelius wrote the duo sometime between 1875 (nine to 10 years old) and—more likely—1881 (15 years old). Regardless, Water Droplets retains a degree of historical significance as Sibelius's earliest written work. Fazer Music published the piece in 1997. A typical performance lasts 45 seconds.

== History ==
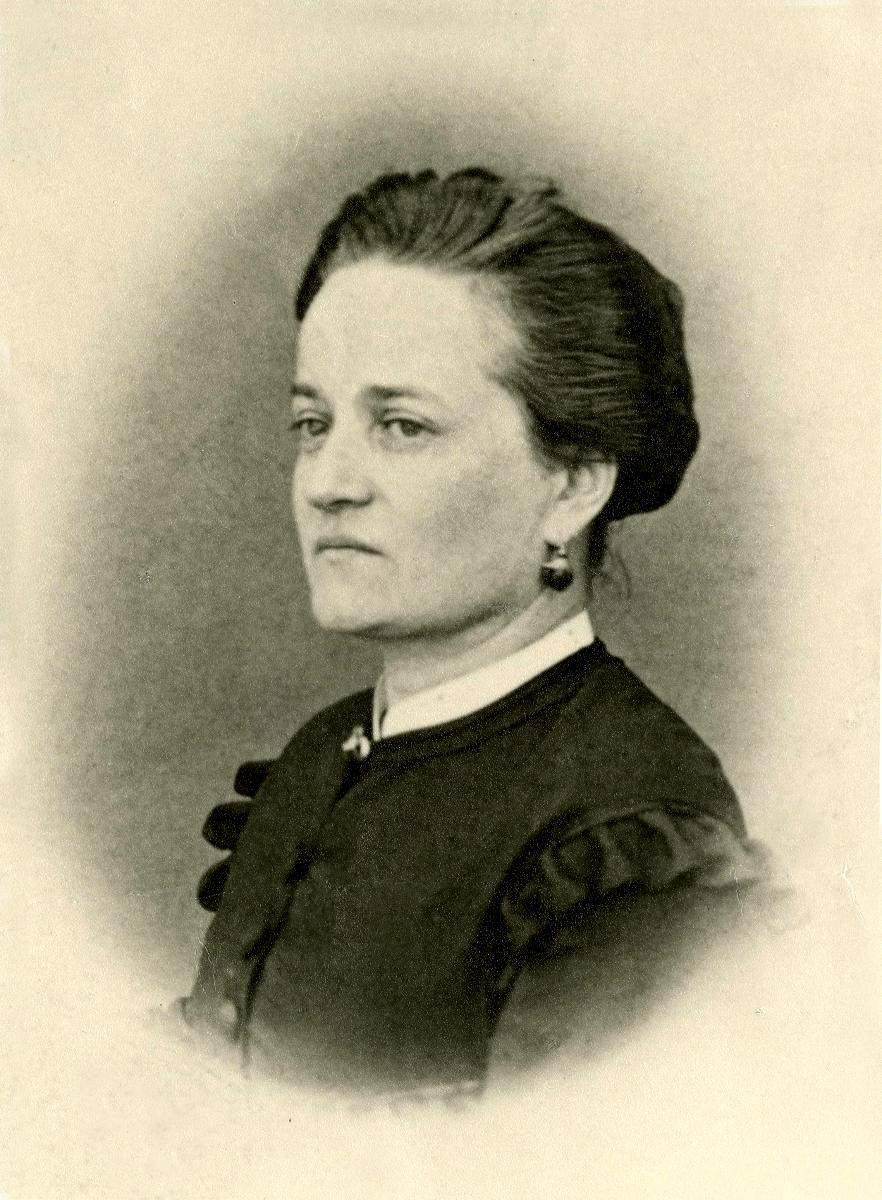
Evelina Sibelius, Janne's favorite aunt, recognized her nephew's talent early.

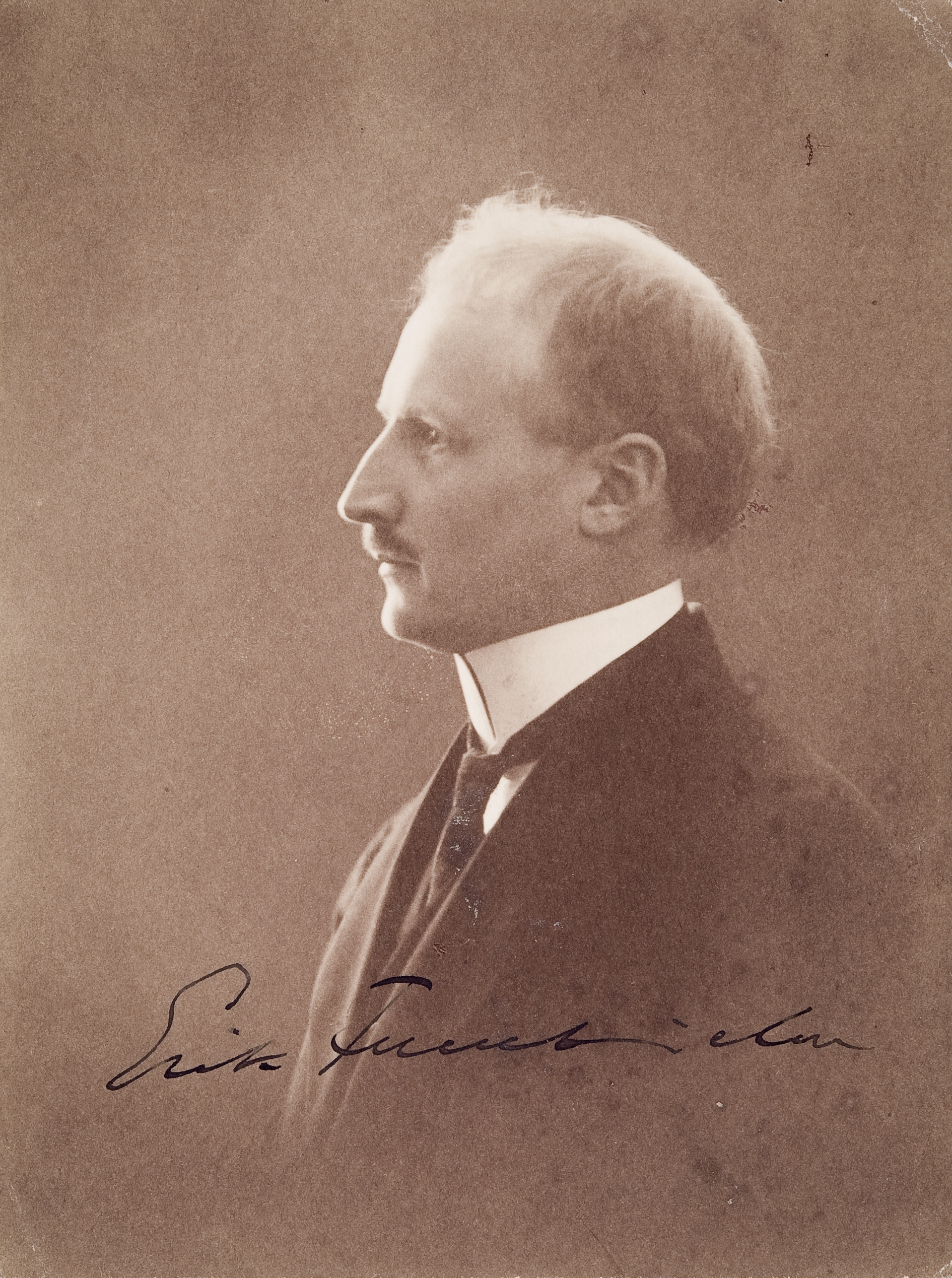
Sibelius's first biographer, Erik Furuhjelm, made a copy of Water Droplets for his book.

Sibelius's father, Christian Gustaf, died of typhus on 31 July 1868, leaving behind his pregnant, 26-year old wife Maria (née Borg), as well as two young children: Jean (then two) and his older sister Linda; Christian had mismanaged his affairs, and following his death, his estate was declared bankrupt. Maria was forced to move back in with her widowed mother, Juliana Borg (née Haartman), and two unmarried sisters (Tekla and Julia); shortly thereafter, she gave birth to Sibelius's younger brother, Christian, on 27 March 1869. Throughout his childhood, Sibelius—then called Janne—lived within this extended family circle, which moved around Hämeenlinna several times. The children typically summered in Loviisa with their paternal grandmother, Katarina (née Åkerberg), and Aunt Evelina.

Sibelius's first attempts at composition—improvisational in nature—were at the family piano, on which his Aunt Julia began teaching him at age seven. Later in life, Sibelius claimed that his first composition had been a piano piece for children's theatre called Desert Scene (Ökenscen); no trace of this work has ever been found, perhaps because he never committed it to paper. Moreover, Aunt Evelina—who "very early on ... grasped the exceptional nature of [Sibelius's] musical talent, and watched its growth with sympathy and understanding"—was the subject of another early work, Aunt Evelina's Life in Music (Faster Evelinas liv i toner), an "embryonic Sinfonia domestica" that the boy also never bothered to write down.

Scholars believe the first composition that Sibelius committed to paper is a short, 12-measure duo for violin and cello pizzicato, (Note: At a concert in Tokyo on 13 February 2015, the Japanese violinist Sayaka Shoji performed Sibelius's Water Droplets as a 'solo duo', playing the violin and cello parts with her right and left hands, respectively.) which he titled Water Droplets (Vattendroppar in his mother tongue of Swedish). The piece only survives as a copy—likely made in 1915—by the Finnish composer and scholar Erik Furuhjelm, who was then writing the first biography of Sibelius in honor of the composer's semicentennial; to complete the book, he needed to examine Sibelius's juvenilia and early professional works (such as the withdrawn choral symphony Kullervo). Because the autograph manuscript is lost (Erik Tawaststjerna, Sibelius's most expansive biographer, implies Sibelius destroyed it in "the bonfires which warmed his old age"), Water Droplets cannot be dated with precision. While Tawaststjerna dates the duo to 1875 (when Sibelius would have been nine or 10 years old), (Note: Sibelius's secretary, Santeri Levas, dates Water Droplets to 1876.) other scholars—for example, Fabian Dahlström, an authority on the composer's manuscripts—posit that Water Droplets more likely dates to 1881, when he was a 15-year old. Their reasoning is that in the mid-to-late 1870s Sibelius likely did not yet know the violin and cello well enough to write Water Droplets, because he would not begin violin lessons until the autumn of 1881, when he became a pupil of the local Hämeenlinna military bandmaster, Gustaf Levander. (Note: Sibelius's paternal uncle, Petr, was a dilettante musician who acted as a surrogate father and helped to fund his nephew's education and music lessons.) Indeed, Sibelius may have written the piece as an exercise for himself and Christian, who played the cello.

== Music ==
Water Droplets, which was published posthumously in 1997 by Fazer Music, is in the key of E minor and has a 4/4 time signature. Structurally, it is, according to Daniel Grimley, "a little Mozartian study ... with a simple Alberti (broken-chord) accompaniment", in which the main theme is first presented (measures 1–4) and then twice repeated with modifications (measures 5–8 and 9–12).

Measures 1–4 of Water Droplets

== Reception ==
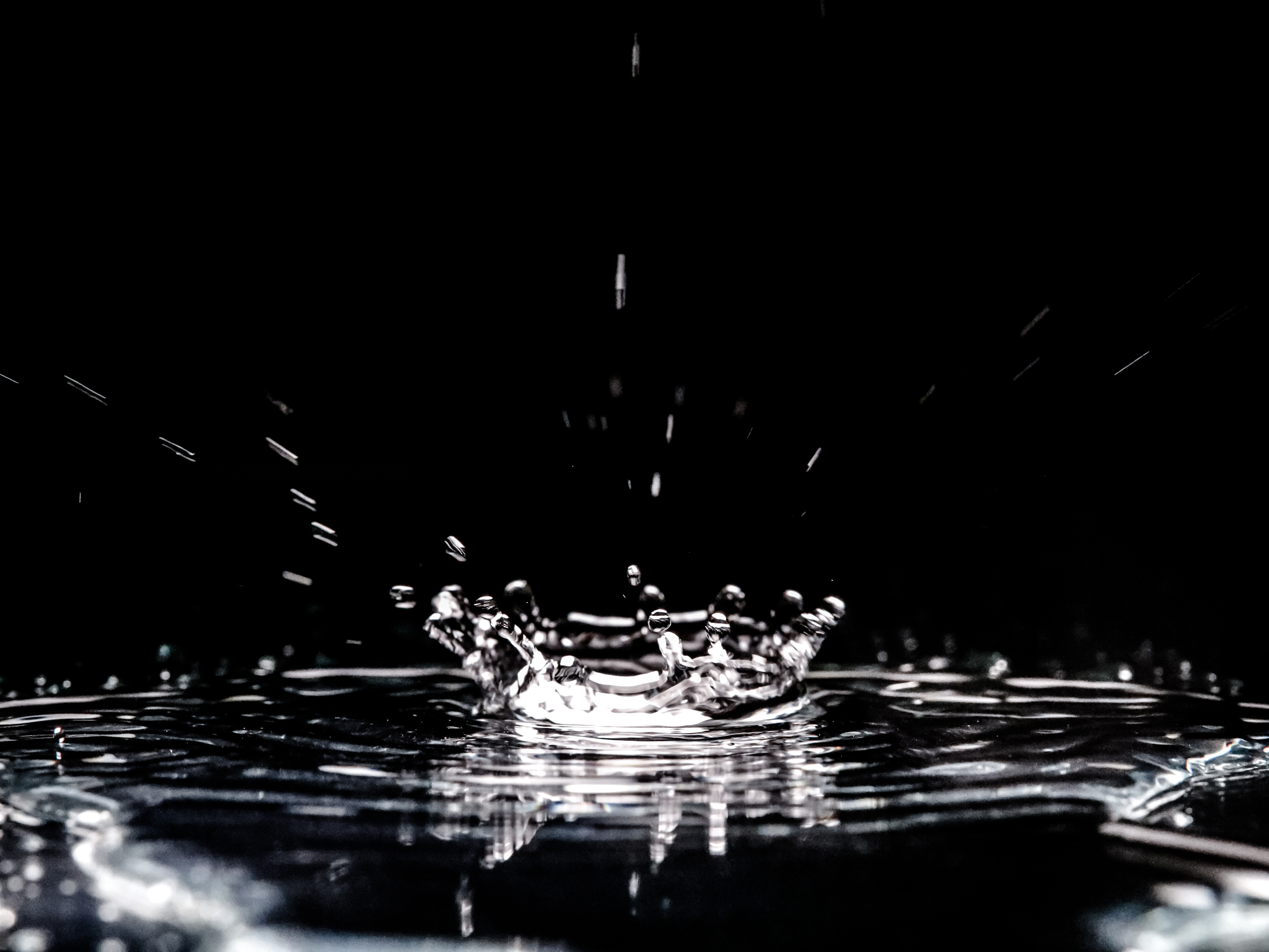
In Sibelius's piece, each string pluck from the violin and cello recalls the splat of a water droplet.

While the piece "is no early product of a child genius", it nonetheless is a charming miniature in which Sibelius displays an "instinctive feeling for form". Moreover, with his deployment of a "realistic", almost onomatopoeic pizzicato, Sibelius demonstrates an ability to use instruments "[colorfully] ... to achieve the right atmosphere".

Glenda Dawn Goss goes further, placing Water Droplets in the context of both Finnish nationalism and Sibelius's special brand of "musical feeling":

Later Finnish nationalists who were in the business of promoting Sibelius as a young genius claimed that already at the age of ten, the prodigious youngster was showing his future path [with Water Droplets] ... It seems unlikely that Vattendroppar comes from so early a time. Yet whatever its date, the symbolic meaning of those twenty-four measures cannot be gainsaid: they reveal indisputably that Sibelius thought compositionally in terms of vibrating strings. Not for this composer "orchestrating" a piano draft: the thrum and twang of strings, the reedy honking of woodwinds, the resonant flaring of brass—in the very physicality of sound lay the essence of music. (Note: Goss's comment recalls that of Levas: "[Sibelius] heard his music already in instrumental form. The majority of composers first write a short score and only deal with orchestration afterwards. Sibelius never did that, but wrote directly into full score bar by bar. I once asked him if he often had to think about which particular instrument should be considered: ... 'Never! My music is ready in its instrumental form. Actual "orchestration" is something with which I am quite unfamiliar'".)

In contrast, Harold Johnson's verdict is the most reserved: "What it establishes more than anything else," he writes, "is the fact that the boy was eager to create his own music".

== Discography ==
The Japanese violinist Yoshiko Arai and the Finnish cellist Seppo Kimanen made the world premiere studio recording of Water Droplets in 1995 for Ondine. The table below lists this and other commercially available recordings:

No.	Violin	Cello	Runtime (Note: All runtimes are official, as printed on CD or LP liner notes.)	Rec. (Note: Refers to the year in which the performers recorded the work; this may not be the same as the year in which the recording was first released to the general public.)	Recording venue	Label	Ref.
1	Yoshiko Arai	Seppo Kimanen	0:44	1995	Järvenpää Hall	Ondine	(Note: Y. Arai & S. Kimanen–Ondine (ODE 850–2) 1995)
2	Jaakko Kuusisto	Taneli Turunen	0:45	2003	Järvenpää Hall	BIS	(Note: J. Kuusisto & T. Turunen–BIS (CD–1924/26) 2009)
3	Lucie Sedláková Hůlová	Martin Sedlak	0:35 (1:18) (Note: In this recording, the performers repeat the piece (for 24 measures total). The duration of the initial 12 measures is provided first, with the official runtime provided parenthetically.)	2018	Studio Domovina, Prague	Arta Music	(Note: L. Sedláková Hůlová & M. Sedlák–Arta Music (F10231) 2019)
4	Daniel Rowland	Maja Bogdanović	0:45 (1:47)	2019	Potton Hall, Suffolk	Challenge Classics	(Note: D. Rowland & M. Bogdanović–Challenge Classics (CC72833) 2020)
5	Janine Jansen	Klaus Mäkelä	0:47	2024	Oslo Konserthus	Decca Classics	

== Notes, references, and sources ==
Notes

Sources

- "Water Droplets / Vesipisaroita". fennicagehrman.fi. Fennica Gehrman. 2017.
- Barnett, Andrew (2007). Sibelius. New Haven, Connecticut: Yale University Press. ISBN 978-0-300-16397-1.
- Dahlström, Fabian [in Swedish] (2003). Jean Sibelius: Thematisch-bibliographisches Verzeichnis seiner Werke [Jean Sibelius: A Thematic Bibliographic Index of His Works] (in German). Wiesbaden: Breitkopf & Härtel. ISBN 3-7651-0333-0.
- Furuhjelm, Erik [in Finnish] (1916). Jean Sibelius: Hans tondiktning och drag ur hand liv (in Swedish). Borgå: Holger Schildt. OCLC 12248551.
- Goss, Glenda Dawn (2009). Sibelius: A Composer's Life and the Awakening of Finland. Chicago: University of Chicago Press. ISBN 978-0-226-00547-8.
- Grimley, Daniel (2021). Jean Sibelius: Life, Music, Silence. Reaktion Books. ISBN 978-1-78914-466-6.
- Johnson, Harold (1959). Jean Sibelius (1st ed.). New York: Alfred A. Knopf. ISBN 9780313204708. OCLC 603128.
- Levas, Santeri (1986) [1972]. Jean Sibelius: A Personal Portrait. Translated by Young, Percy (2nd ed.). Porvoo/Juva, Finland: Werner Söderström oy. ISBN 978-9-51013-608-9.
- Murtomäki, Veijo [in Finnish]. "Sibelius, Jean (1865–1957)". kansallisbiografia.fi. Translated by Roderick, Fletcher. National Biography of Finland.
- Ringbom, Nils-Eric [in Finnish] (1954) [1948]. Jean Sibelius: A Master and His Work. Translated by de Courcy, G. I. C. Norman, Oklahoma: University of Oklahoma. ISBN 978-0-837-19840-8.
- Sirén, Vesa [in Finnish]. "Music Becomes a Serious Pursuit: 1881–1885". sibelius.fi. Finnish Club of Helsinki.
- Tawaststjerna, Erik (2008a) [1965/1967; trans. 1976]. Sibelius: Volume I, 1865–1905. Translated by Layton, Robert. London: Faber and Faber. ISBN 978-0-571-24772-1.
- Tawaststjerna, Erik (2008b) [1978/1988; trans. 1997]. Sibelius: Volume III, 1914–1957. Translated by Layton, Robert. London: Faber and Faber. ISBN 978-0-571-24774-5.
