= Thanks for the Book Award =

Finnish literary prize

The Thanks for the Book Award, (Kiitos kirjasta -mitali in Finnish and Tack för boken-medaljen in Swedish), is a Finnish literary prize that has been presented since 1966 by the Organization of the Booksellers’ Association of Finland (Kirjakauppaliitto r.y.), Libro ry and the Finnish Library Association (Suomen kirjastoseura ry).

The award is presented once a year to a Finnish author whose work of fiction the previous year has particularly stimulated literature in Finland. The book may have been written in Finnish or in Swedish.

== Prizewinners ==
- 1966: Prinsessan by Gunnar Mattsson and Nuori metsästäjä by Jaakko Syrjä
- 1967: Mörkrets kärna by Marianne Alopaeus
- 1968: Arkkienkeli Oulussa by Anu Kaipainen and Hänen olivat linnut by Marja-Liisa Vartio
- 1969: Tilapää by Eila Pennanen
- 1970: Mustan lumen talvi by Kalle Päätalo
- 1971: Solveigin laulu by Lassi Sinkkonen
- 1972: Människan som skalv by Christer Kihlman
- 1973: Varokaa, voittajat by Eeva-Liisa Manner
- 1974: Simpauttaja by Heikki Turunen
- 1975: Vetää kaikista ovista by Eeva Joenpelto
- 1976: Dyre prins by Christer Kihlman
- 1977: Ihmisen ääni by Elina Karjalainen
- 1978: Ja pesäpuu itki by Matti Pulkkinen
- 1979: Vuosisadan rakkaustarina by Märta Tikkanen
- 1980: Hiljainen kesä by Eeva Tikka
- 1981: Viistotaival by Orvokki Autio
- 1982: Suruvaippa by Saara Finni
- 1983: Pohjanmaa by Antti Tuuri
- 1984: Vaiteliaat vuodet by Eila Kostamo
- 1985: Häräntappoase by Anna-Leena Härkönen
- 1986: Tainaron by Leena Krohn
- 1987: Kertomus by Antti Hyry
- 1988: Axel by Bo Carpelan
- 1989: Tatuoitu sydän by Timo Pusa
- 1990: Leo by Ulla-Lena Lundberg
- 1991: Båten i vassen by Benedict Zilliacus
- 1992: Tummien perhosten koti by Leena Lander
- 1993: Colorado Avenue by Lars Sund
- 1994: Ihon aika by Anja Snellman (née Kauranen)
- 1995: Underbara kvinnor vid vatten by Monika Fagerholm
- 1996: Liian paksu perhoseksi by Sisko Istanmäki
- 1997: Drakarna över Helsingfors by Kjell Westö
- 1998: Klassikko by Kari Hotakainen
- 2001: Mansikoita marraskuussa by Pirjo Hassinen
- 2002: Rajattomuuden aika by Eeva Kilpi
- 2003: Auringon asema by Ranya Paasonen (née ElRamly)
- 2004: Helene by Rakel Liehu
- 2005: Vanikan palat by Hannu Väisänen
- 2006: Sarasvatin hiekkaa by Risto Isomäki
- 2007: Viikkoja, kuukausia by Reko and Tina Lundán
- 2008: Lakanasiivet by Sirpa Kähkönen
- 2009: Marie by Arne Nevanlinna
- 2010: Herra Darwinin puutarhuri by Kristina Carlson
- 2011: Mielensäpahoittaja by Tuomas Kyrö
- 2012: Kätilö (The Midwife) by Katja Kettu
- 2013: Nälkävuosi (White Hunger) by Aki Ollikainen
- 2014: Taivaslaulu by Pauliina Rauhala
- 2015: Neljäntienristeys by Tommi Kinnunen
- 2016: Paha kirja by Kaj Korkea-aho
- 2017: Lempi by Minna Rytisalo
- 2018: Sandra by Heidi Köngäs
- 2019: I will never go back, I think by Satu Vasantola
- 2020: Feet in the Air by Antti Rönkä
- 2021: Nainen joka rakasti hyönteisiä by Selja Ahava
- 2022: Rottien pyhimys by Anneli Kanto
- 2023: Arvejord by Maria Turtschaninoff
