= Historisk Tidsskrift =

Historisk Tidsskrift or Historisk Tidskrift may refer to:

- Historisk Tidsskrift (Denmark), a Danish historical journal
- Historisk Tidsskrift (Norway), a Norwegian historical journal
- Historisk Tidskrift (Sweden), a Swedish historical journal
- Historisk Tidskrift (Finland), a Swedish-language Finnish historical journal
