= Peter Sandelin =

Finland-Swedish poet and visual artist (1930–2019)

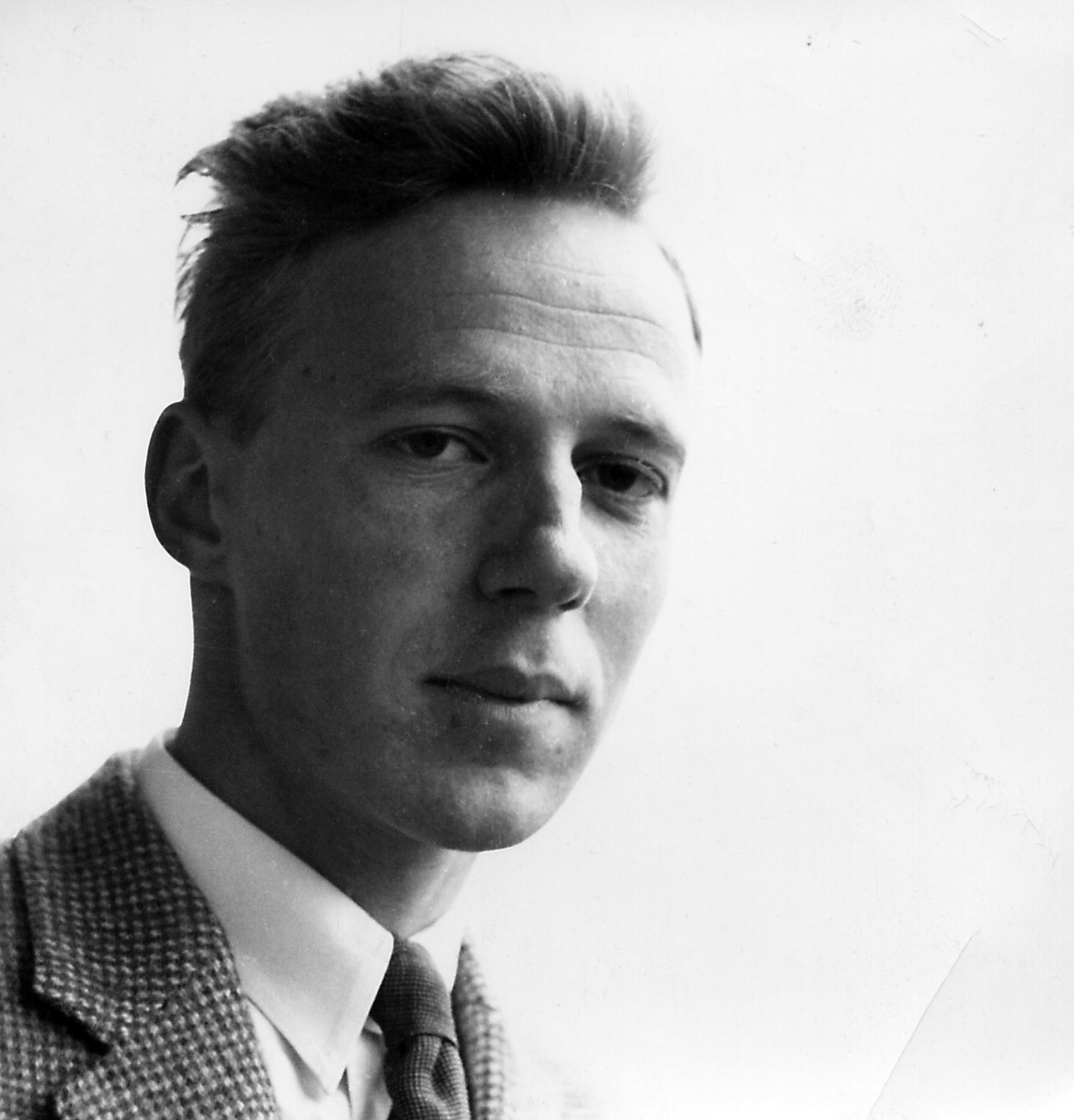
- Born: 30 May 1930; Jakobstad, Finland
- Died: 16 February 2019 (aged 88); Helsinki, Finland
- Occupations: Author, visual artist
- Years active: 1951–2013
- Spouse: Nina Veronica Parland (m. 1967)
- Children: Annika Sandelin
- Relatives: Carl Fredrik Sandelin

Peter Johan Sandelin (30 May 1930 – 16 February 2019) was a Finland-Swedish poet and visual artist. He lived in Helsinki.

Born in Jakobstad, Sandelin was the son of Carl Victor Sandelin, a medical doctor, and Marianne Hackman. From 1954 he worked as a freelance literary and art critic for Hufvudstadsbladet and as a correspondent for the magazine Paletten. Between 1973 and 1983 he was on the board of Society of Swedish Authors in Finland (Finlands svenska författareförening).

Sandelin made his debut as a poet in 1951 with Ur svalans loggbok published by Schildts Förlag. He wrote in a modernist tradition. His poetry is said to be inspired by Gunnar Björling and Rabbe Enckell. He was awarded with the Swedish Academy Finland Prize in 2005.

Sandelin was also a visual artist. He graduated from the Svenska aftonläroverket in Helsinki in 1952 and then studied at Fria konstskolan in 1953 and the Helsingin yliopiston piirustussali from 1954 to 1955. He had several solo exhibitions, culminating in a retrospective exhibition at the Amos Anderson Art Museum in Helsinki in 2000. His abstract painting, often in small format, was intimate and restrained, in harmony with the imagery of poetry.

Sandelin died in Helsinki at the age of 88 in 2019.

== Bibliography ==
- 1951 – Ur svalans loggbok
- 1953 – De lysande och de döda
- 1957 – Etyder
- 1960 – Stunder av ljus
- 1962 – Hemma i universum
- 1965 – En vanlig solig dag
- 1968 – Minuter på jorden
- 1970 – Fågeln i stenmuren
- 1971 – Tyst stiger havet
- 1973 – Var det du?
- 1975 – Barnen på rymdens strand
- 1977 – Klockan 5 och klockan ingenting vid havet (dikturval)
- 1977 – Dikter med varandra
- 1980 – Dikter mellan vinter och vinter
- 1982 – Vägen upphör men jag fortsätter
- 1984 – Den undermedvetna staden
- 1986 – Den vita orten
- 1989 – Existens
- 1991 – Ljuset över leran (dikturval)
- 1992 – Regnets uråldriga sätt att regna
- 1995 – Vedhuggaren i natten
- 1998 – Tystnader, ljud
- 2000 – I skuggan av ingenting
- 2003 – Cyklar utan att hålla i
- 2007 – Bo vid en flod
- 2009 – Stenar och ljus
- 2013 – Måsen och skeppet

== Awards ==
- 1961, 1966 – State Prize in Literature (Finnish: kirjallisuuden valtionpalkinto)
- 1961, 1966, 1969 – Society of Swedish Literature in Finland's prize
- 1973 – Konstsamfundet's pris
- 1990 – Tollander-prize
- 2001 – Pro Finlandia-medal
- 2005 – Swedish Academy Finland Prize

== Literature ==
- Ekman, Michel (2005). Att glödga orden med tystnad: En essä om Peter Sandelins diktning. Espoo: Schildt. ISBN 951-50-1479-4.
- Fors, Hans (1961). "Att i omedelbarhet mogna". Horisont (1): 5–7.
- Hagman, Kaj (1966). "Diktaren i nuet". Horisont (2): 48–52.
- Hedlund, Tom (1980). "'Bland de små universella frågorna' – synpunkter på Peter Sandelins poesi". Dikten som liv. Stockholm: Liber publishing. pp. 150–165.
- Hedlund, Tom (1972). "'Mitt ansikte är inte bortvänt': Människa och natur i Peter Sandelins dikt". Horisont (6): 12–18.
- Holmström, Roger (1978). "Rymdperspektivet i Peter Sandelins diktning". Finsk Tidskrift: 249.
- Sundell, Dan (2000). Peter Sandelin: Målningar. Retrospektiv utställning. Maalauksia: Retrospektiivinen näyttely. Amos Andersonin taidemuseon julkaisuja: Uusi sarja, 33. Helsinki: Amos Andersonin taidemuseo. ISBN 952-9531-32-X. ISSN 0788-0138.
- Tarkka, Pekka & Laitinen, Kai & Willner, Sven (1983). "Peter Sandelin". Författare i Finland. Porvoo. pp. 208–210.
- Warburton, Thomas (1984). Åttio år finlandssvensk litteratur. Jakobstad. pp. 372–375.
