= Birgitta Boucht =

Finland-Swedish writer

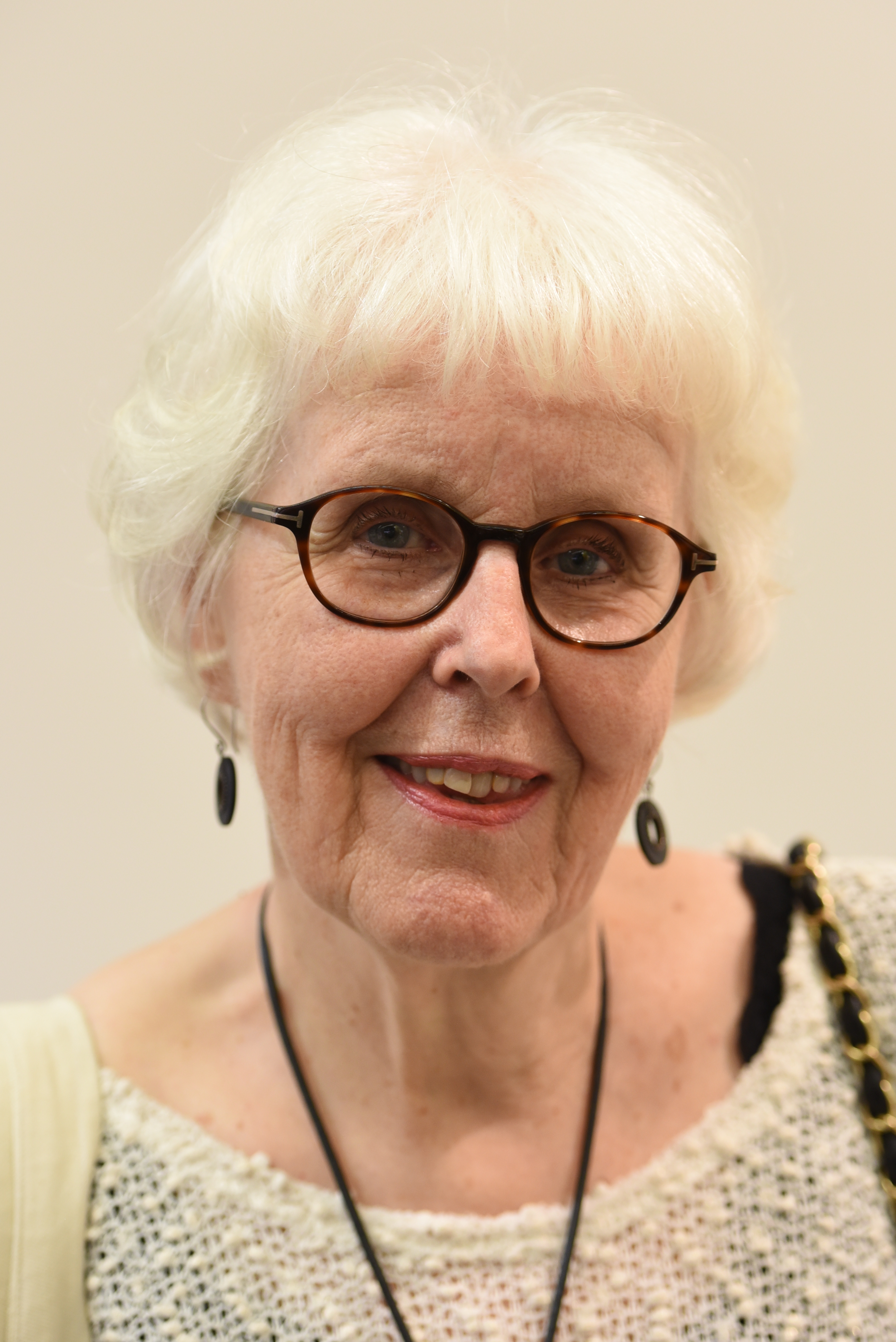
- Birgitta Boucht on Bokmässan 2016.
- Born: Karin Birgitta Pihlström; 27 April 1940 (age 86); Helsinki, Finland
- Occupations: Author, translator, editor
- Relatives: Bengt Pihlström (brother)
- Writing career
- Language: Swedish
- Notable works: Tusenblad, en kvinna som snubblar Förklädd och naken

Karin Birgitta Boucht (née Pihlström; born 27 April 1940) is a Finland-Swedish author, translator and editor. Born in Helsinki, she graduated from Laurellska skolan in 1958. She is also a politics magister, a degree she obtained at Helsinki University in 1964.

== Biography ==
Birgitta Boucht's father was Torsten Pihlström. Her parents were search assistant Torsten Edvard Pihlström and consultant Karin Ulrika Johansson. Boucht was married to Carl-Johan Boucht from 1961 to 1971. In the early 1970s, Boucht worked at Rundradion (as planner 1970–1974) and from 1974 to 1978 at Folkets Bildningsförbund (as study secretary). She has been involved in the Book Association for Southern Finland (board member 1974–1979 and chairman 1976) and in the People's Democratic Association Bread and Roses. From 1980 she was editor-in-chief of the magazine Fredsposten.

During the 1990s, Boucht was editor-in-chief of the magazine Astra from 1995 to 2000, which was then called Astra Nova.

She has been strongly involved in Finland-Swedish Easy read literature (in Swedish Lättläst) and has often been the leader of writing circles in various parts of Swedish Finland.

=== Women's and peace movement ===
Boucht has also had a prominent role in the women's movement and the peace movement in Finland. She was a member of the Marxist feminists group (MF group) active in the 1970s. Together with Carita Nyström she wrote This world is ours! Handbook of sisterhood which was published in 1975. In the summer of 1981, Boucht and two of her daughters participated in the Nordic women's peace march from Copenhagen to Paris. The march lasted seven weeks and went through five countries. Other Finnish participants in the march included Ulla Gyllenberg and Tatiana Sundgren.

=== Publications (selection) ===
Birgitta Boucht has written in several different genres such as poetry, fiction, reportage and debate books, and Easy Reading books.

This world is ours. Handbook of Sisterhood from 1975 is Boucht's debut. In 1979, the volume of prose and poetry Livs levande och was published, and in 1981 the poetry collection Långa vandring, which depicts the path of women from ancient times to our own.

In the prose book Open Spaces in 1985, Boucht provides insight into the life of a homeless person. Glädjezon in 1986 is about the Paris March 1981 and the Washington March 1983, in which Birgitta Boucht herself participated. In 1988, the poetry collection De fyrtionio dagarna was published. In 1991, Boucht published the letter book Postfeminism (together with Carita Nyström, Anna Rotkirch and Maria Serrano).

The Conservator's Look 2002 consists of short prose texts and thematizes an existential journey. The poetry collection Kroppens Esperanto 2003 addresses the psychological stresses that a serious illness gives rise to. In Sökord 2009 (together with Mariella Lindén and Harriet Clayhills) friendship, illness, old age and death are examined in letters, images and texts. In 2014, Förklädd och naken was published, an autobiographical text about a disharmonious upbringing and about life as a writer and pioneer in the women's movement.

== Awards and distinctions ==
- 1985 – State Information Prize, as editor-in-chief of Fredsposten
- 1998 – Fredrika Runeberg Scholarship
- 2003 and 2008 – Society of Swedish Authors in Finland's prize
- 2008 – Honorary Doctor at Åbo Akademi University
- 2015 – Tollander Prize, for the memoirbook Disguised and Naked, and the authorship

Her book Tusenblad, a woman who stumbles was nominated for the Runeberg Prize 2012.

== Bibliography ==
- Swedish-language regional programs. An audience survey by Birgitta Boucht, Elisabeth Franck, Anna-Marja Nurminen & Jan-Christer Wahlbeck. 1971.
- Selostus lasten-uutiskokeilusta. By Birgitta Boucht and Sirkka Minkkinen. 1971.
- The Swedish-language current affairs programs for children and youth. Birgitta Bouch, Singa Sandelin. 1972.
- This world is ours! Handbook in sisterhood. By Birgitta Boucht and Carita Nyström. In women's memory: Poems 1965–1975. By Carita Nyström. Talk about what you know: Poems from the summer of 1975. By Birgitta Boucht. 1975
- Life Alive, 1979
- Violence in the home. A report on the abuse of women by Sirkka Germain et al. (translation), 1980.
- Haluamme elää! Vi vill levä! We want to live! (editor), 1981.
- Långa vandring, 1981
- Öppna rum: Insyn hos en bostadlös, 1985
- Glädjezone, 1986
- Kärleken till ordet. An anthology by Porvoo skrivarklubb with an introductory essay by Birgitta Boucht, 1986
- Loose notes about grandmother, Marjut and death, 1987
- Forty-nine days, 1988
- Postfeminism, 1991
- Circling, 1991
- The earth is shaking: A book about falling in love. By Birgitta Boucht, photo Charlotta Boucht, 1991
- Around the world. An easy-to-read book with text by Birgitta Boucht, photos by Charlotta Boucht, 1996
- Remembering, forgetting and silence: Sibling letters, Birgitta Boucht & Bengt Pihlström, 1997
- My name is Hanna, 1998
- Mariposa: A novel, 1999
- A fire is burning: Inspiration book for writers, 2000
- The curator's gaze: 63 texts, Schildt, 2002
- The Body's Esperanto, 2003
- The Worst Company I Can Have: Poems, 2005
- The Road Leads Onward and the Stars Are Intense Here Too: 20 Years with the Edith Södergran Society. Editor Birgitta Boucht, 2005
- The Day Has 179 Hours: A Book About Alma, Vera and Adrian. Illustrations by Christer Lieberath, 2008.
- Keywords: Friendship, death, room, letters, books, 2009
- With the right of age. With Tomas Mikael Bäck (ed.), 2010
- The cat in Edith's garden: An easy-to-read book about Edith Södergran with her photos and poems, 2011
- Thousand leaves, a woman who stumbles: Novel, 2011.
- On free terms: Edith Södergran studies. Editor Arne Toftegaard Pedersen, editorial advisors Birgitta Boucht, Agneta Rahikainen and Ann-Christine Snickars, 2011
- Disguised and naked: Self-portrait, soulmates, writing, 2014
- Tears, love, desserts, 2014
- The roar in a lonely ear, 2016
