= The American Girl =

2005 novel by Monika Fagerholm

- First edition
- Author: Monika Fagerholm
- Original title: Den amerikanska flickan
- Language: Swedish
- Published: 2005
- Publisher: Albert Bonniers Förlag
- Publication place: Finland
- Awards: August Prize of 2005

The American Girl (Swedish: Den amerikanska flickan) is a 2005 novel by Swedish-speaking Finnish author Monika Fagerholm. It won the August Prize in 2005.
