= Eeva Joenpelto =

Finnish novelist (1921–2004)

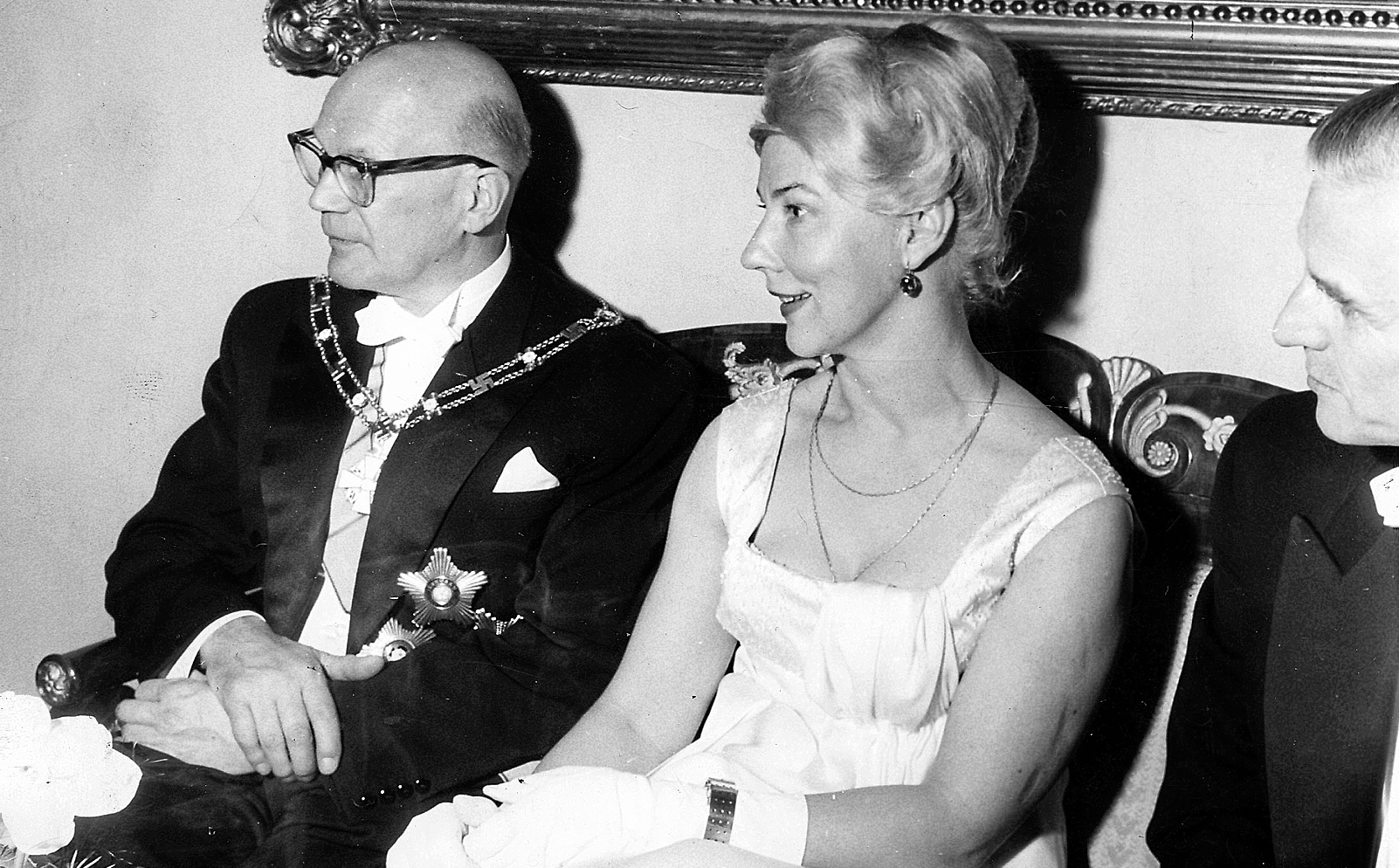
Eeva Joenpelto (middle) sitting next to president Urho Kekkonen (left) on Independence Day, 1958.

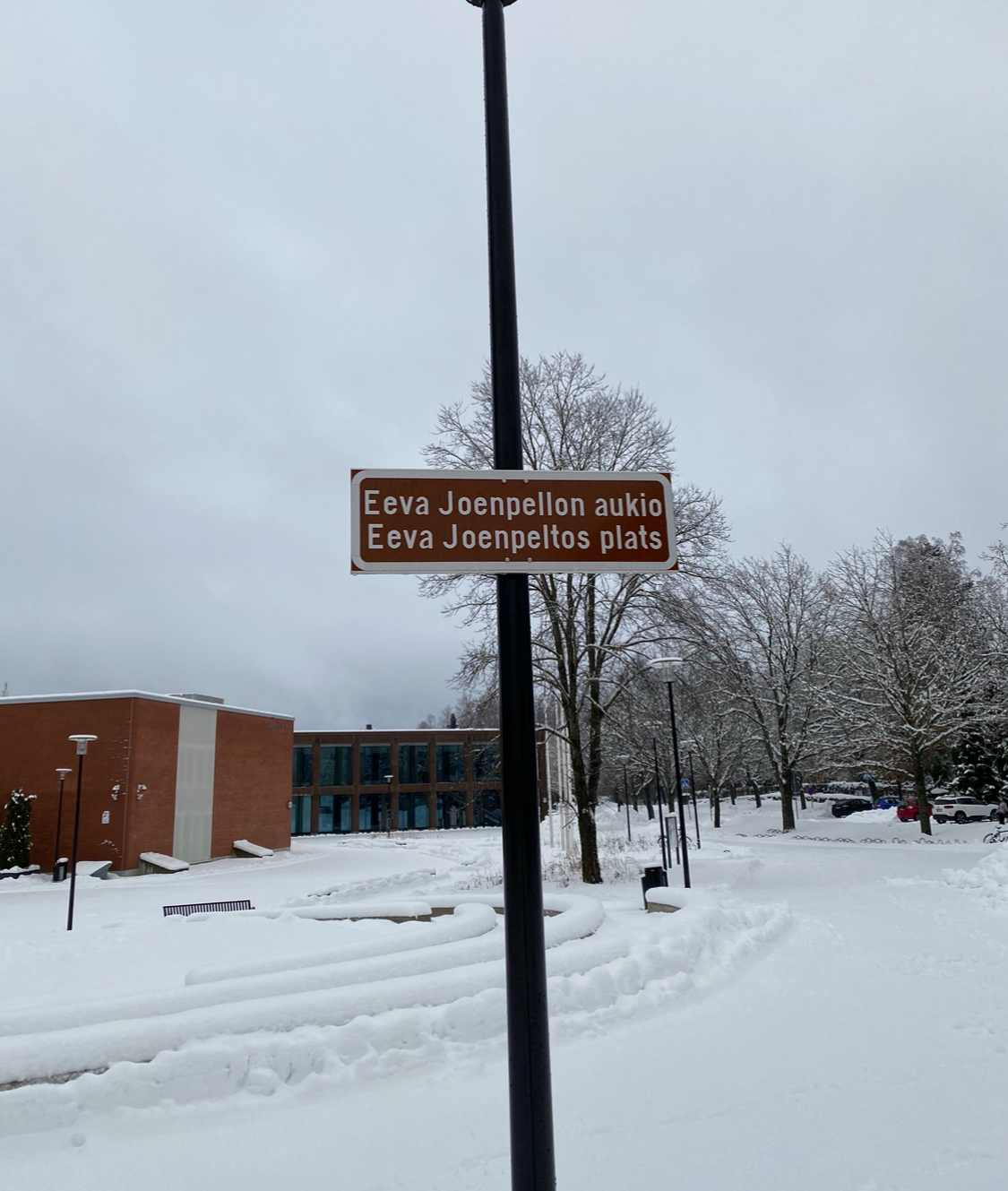
Eeva Joenpelto's Square in Lohja.

Eeva Elisabeth Joenpelto (17 June 1921, Sammatti, Finland – 28 January 2004, Lohja, Finland), married name after 1945 Hellemann, was a Finnish novelist. Her writing is especially remembered for the Lohja tetralogy which depicted strong women. Described as a "productive novelist of monomaniacal intensity", she occasionally wrote under the pseudonyms of Eeva Helle and Eeva Autere. Joenpelto was President of PEN Finland in 1964-67 and worked as an art professor from 1980 to 1985. She was married (until 1975) to Jarl Hellemann, the CEO of Tammi.

== Eeva Joenpelto Prize ==
The Eeva Joenpelto Prize in literature has been awarded by Lohja to honor the city's written heritage. Its recipients have been:

- 1988 – Jaan Kross
- 1992 – Olof Lagercrantz
- 1995 – Sándor Csoóri
- 1998 – Andreï Makine
- 2001 – Bernhard Schlink
- 2004 – Herbjørg Wassmo

== Selected works ==
- Seitsemän päivää, under the pseudonym Eeva Helle 1946
- Tulee sittenkin päivä..., under the pseudonym Eeva Autere 1950
- Kaakerholman kaupunki, 1950
- Veljen varjo, 1951
- Johannes vain, 1952
- Kivi palaa, 1953
- Neito kulkee vetten päällä, 1955
- Missä lintuset laulaa, 1957
- Ralli, 1959
- Syyskesä, 1960
- Kipinöivät vuodet, 1961
- Naisten kesken, 1962
- Viisaat istuvat varjossa, 1964
- Ritari metsien pimennosta, 1966
- Halusit tai et, 1969
- Vesissä toinen silmä, [1971
- Vetää kaikista ovista, 1974 (Lohja series, Part 1)
- Kuin kekäle kädessä, 1976 (Lohja series, Part 2)
- Sataa suolaista vettä, 1978 Lohja series, Part 3)
- Eteisiin ja kynnyksille, 1980 (Lohja series, Part 4)
- Elämän rouva, rouva Glad, 1982
- Rikas ja kunniallinen, 1984
- Jottei varjos haalistu, 1986
- Ei ryppyä, ei tahraa, 1989
- Avoin, hellä ja katumaton, 1991
- Tuomari Müller, hieno mies, 1994
- Uskomattomia uhrauksia, 2000

== Awards ==
- Thanks for the Book Award for Vetää kaikista ovista (1975)
- Finlandia Prize for Tuomari Müller, hieno mies (1994)
