= Kökar =

Kökar Kökar kommun
- Municipality
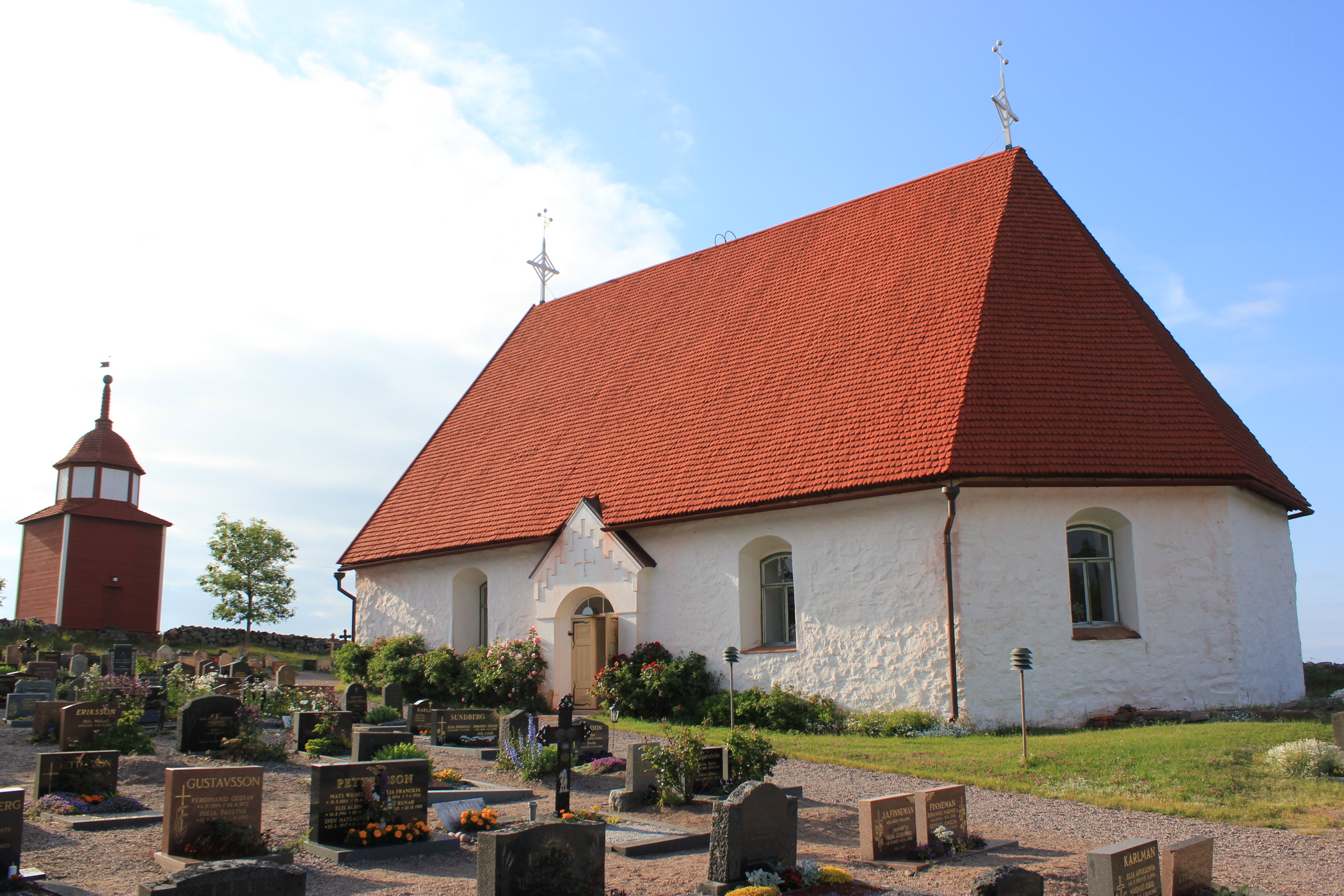
- Church of Saint Anne on Hamnö

- Coat of arms

- Location in Åland
- Coordinates: 59°55.2′N 20°54.5′E
- Country: Finland
- Region: Åland
- Sub-region: Archipelago

Government
  - Municipal manager: Kurt Forsman

Area
  - Total: 2,165 km^{2} (836 sq mi)
  - Land: 63.6 km^{2} (24.6 sq mi)

Population (31 December 2023)
  - Total: 225
  - Density: 3.5/km^{2} (9.1/sq mi)
- Time zone: UTC+2 (EET)
  - Summer (DST): UTC+3 (EEST)
- Website: www.kokar.ax

Kökar (Swedish pronunciation) is an island municipality in the south-eastern part of the Åland archipelago, an autonomous region of Finland.

It is accessible by ferry from Långnäs on Åland's main island and from Galtby on the Finnish mainland.

Kökar has a population of 225 (as of 31 December 2023) and covers a total area of 2,165 km², of which 63.6 km² is land. The population density is 3.5 inhabitants per km².

The municipality is unilingually Swedish (with about 10% Finnish-speaking residents).

The Östra Långskär nature reserve is located within Kökar. Other notable islands include Kyrkogårdsö.

Ulla-Lena Lundberg, a Finnish author, was born in Kökar in 1947.

== History ==
Kökar was first inhabited over 3,000 years ago by seal hunters. A Franciscan monastery was founded in Hamnö in the 15th century. The monastery is now in ruins. The present-day Church of St. Anne was built in 1784 on the site of the old monastery church.

== Sights ==
The Church of St. Anne, built during the reign of King Gustav III, stands on the island of Hamnö. It is located next to the ruins of the Franciscan monastery. The belltower, constructed in the 19th century, was restored after being damaged by a storm in 1978. Inside the church hangs a model of a sailing ship with 64 cannons, donated by a local sailor who had been captured by North African pirates but later escaped.

The local museum, opened in 1988, displays everyday life in Kökar from the 19th century to the 1940s. The museum is housed in a former school building dating from 1913.

There is also a Bronze Age site dating back to 1150–1050 BC, discovered in 1918.
