= Eeva Tikka =

Finnish writer (born 1939)

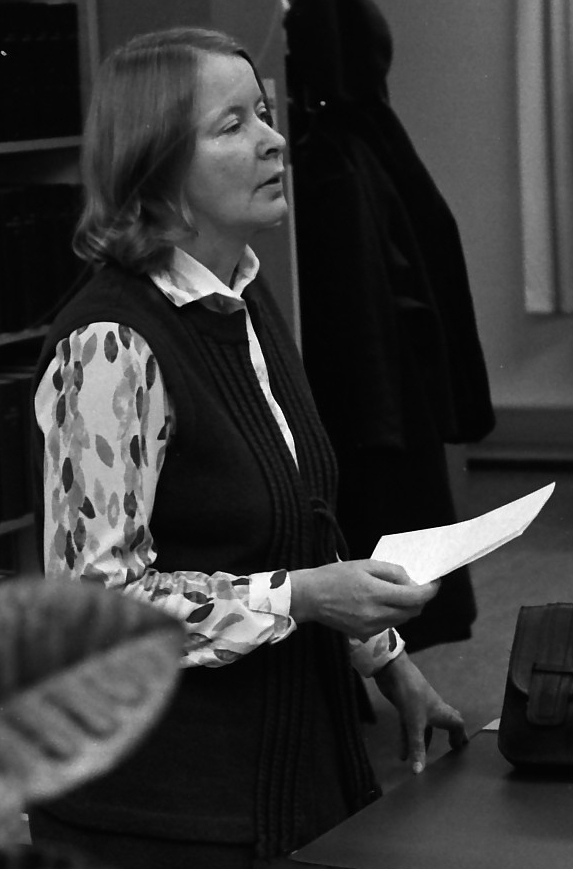
Eeva Tikka

Eeva Tikka (born 31 July 1939 in Ristiina) is a Finnish writer who wrote Hiljainen kesä, which received the 1980 Thanks for the Book Award.
