= Carita Nyström =

Finland-Swedish writer, poet, journalist, and feminist (1940–2019)

Fanny Carita Kristina Nyström (1940–2019) was a Finland-Swedish writer, poet, journalist and feminist. In the 1970s, she gained a reputation as a women's rights activist after publishing her book Denna värld är vår! Handbok i systerskap (This World is Ours. Handbook of Sisterhood) together with Birgitta Boucht. Her feminism was also reflected in her later poetry collections, including Ur moderlivet (From Mother's Life, 1978) and Återväxt (Regrowth, 1982). She established the publishing house Hantverk in 1984 and gave writing courses throughout Swedish-speaking Finland.

== Biography ==
Born on 20 February 1940 in Vaasa, Nyström studied Swedish literature and Nordic philology at the University of Helsinki, graduating in 1968. Thereafter she became an assistant for Nordic philology at the university and worked as a journalist for the Finnish broadcaster Rundradion.

From 1974 to 1978, together with Boucht, she coordinated studies at the Folkets bildningsförbund (People's Education Association). Together they published the ground-breaking Denna värld är vår! Handbok i systerskap (1975), presenting their views of women's new place in society. They cried out: "Give women the tools to let them see and analyse their oppression, reassess their history and, in so doing, achieve feminist awareness and understanding of their true identity." Nyström feminist stance is reflected in her poetry collections Ur moderlivet (1978) and Återväxt (1982). She went on to support various Swedish-Finnish feminist, peace and political movements, including the Vietnam Movement, the Social Democratic association Bröd och Rosor (Bread and Roses), and the Women Marxist-Feminists group which she co-founded.

From 1975, Nyström published 15 books of various types, including poetry, essays, novels and non-fiction. In the mid-1980s, she began to write increasingly autobiographical works. In her poetry collection Huset i rymden (The House in Space, 1984) she describes houses and rooms in which she had lived. Her novel Den förvandlade gatan (The Transformed Street, 1991) is based in part on her memories of Sweden as a war child. Galningen i trädgården och andra berättelser (The Lunatic in the Garden, 1996) evokes her years as a teenager with trips around Europe and the United States. The story of her life continues in Brev från en by i Europa (Letters from a Village in Europe, 2001) and in Sju berättelser från sextiotalet (Seven Tales from the Sixties, 2009).

Translations of her poetry were included in the bilingual Six Finnish Poets (ARC Publications, 2013). Steve Whitaker appreciated her depictions of nature while reviewing Kolme | Tre - Three Poets From Finland (2018) and gives special attention to her poem "Lethe's River", evoking oblivion and remembrance.

Carita Nyström died in Korsnäs on 12 October 2019.
