= Leena Lander =

Finnish author (born 1955)

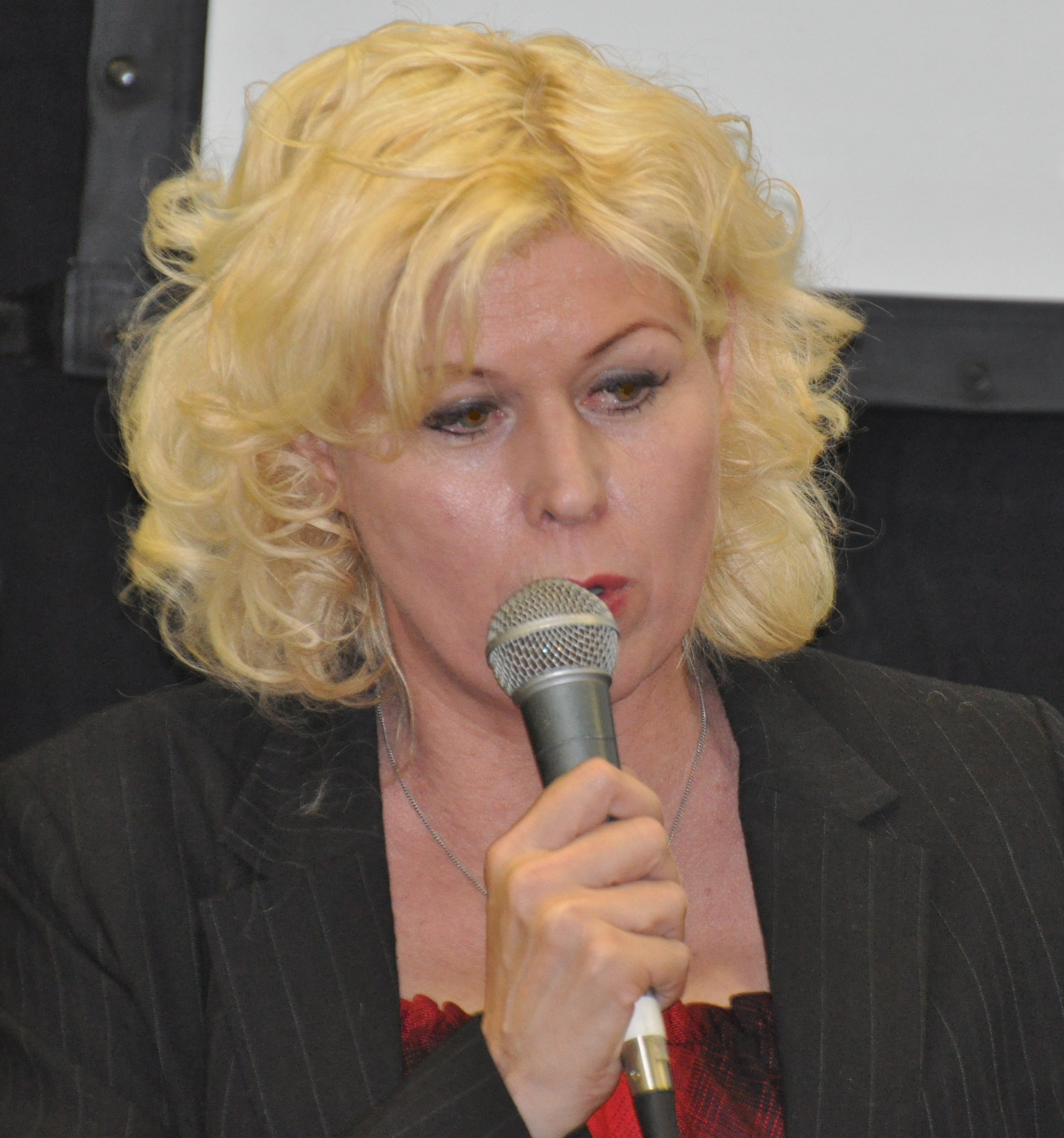
Leena Lander (2010)

Leena Lander (born 25 October 1955, in Turku) is a Finnish author. She grew up in Turku, in a boys' home that her father ran. In 1992, she won the Thanks for the Book Award for Tummien perhosten koti (The Home of the Dark Butterflies), which was made into a successful Finnish film in 2008. Her work is known for its concern with the treatment of children and tensions involving authority and conscience. She also won the Pro Finlandia medal of the Order of the Lion of Finland in 2000.
