= Åke Hellman =

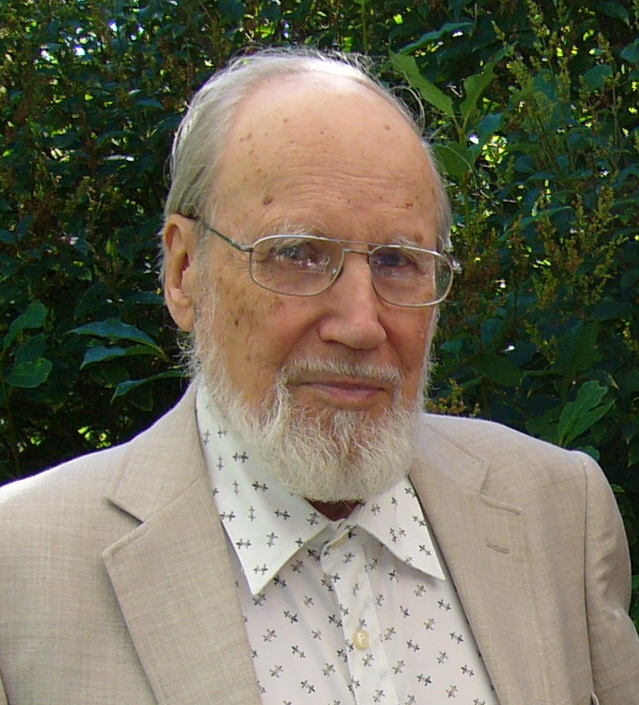
Åke Hellman

Åke Fredrik Hellman (19 July 1915 – 18 December 2017) was a Swedish-speaking Finnish still life and portrait artist and art professor. He worked as art teacher at the University of Helsinki. In 1963, he received the order of the Lion of Finland.

Åke Hellman was born in Helsinki, Grand Duchy of Finland. He was married to the painter Karin Hellman, née Wisuri, who was 11 days older, until her death on 25 February 2004. They met when studying together at Aalto University School of Arts, Design and Architecture 1934–1938, and have the son Karl-Johan (born 1944) and the daughter Åsa (born 1947) who is a ceramist.

Människan och målaren ("The Human and the Painter"), a biography of Hellman written by Ulla-Lena Lundberg and Erik Kruskopf, was published until Hellman's 90th birthday in 2005.

Hellman turned 100 on 19 July 2015. He died in Porvoo on 18 December 2017 at the age of 102.
