= Torsten Steinby =

Bror Torsten Steinby (formerly "Rosbäck") (25 August 1908 – 16 October 1995) was a Finnish historian.

Steinby was son of businessman Carl-Gustaf Rosbäck and bookkeeper Anna Leander-Steinby.

Steinby graduated from the Svenska normallyceum i Helsingfors in 1928, became a candidate of philosophy at the University of Helsinki in 1935 and defended his doctoral thesis in 1956 with the thesis Roman journalism. He studied at the Swedish Archaeological Institute in Rome in 1939.

Steinby worked as a lecturer in Latin and Swedish at the Svenska normallyceum i Helsingfors 1934–1935 and as a teacher of history and Swedish at the National Board of Education for Boys and Girls 1936–1947 (principal 1944–1947). He served as director of the Finnish Rome Institute from 1953 to 1955 and was editor-in-chief of Hufvudstadsbladet from 1960 to 1974, after having been acting editor-in-chief and editorial director from 1947 to 1959.

Steinby was chairman of the Finland's Swedish Publishers' Association from 1957 to 1959 and of the Society of Swedish Literature in Finland from 1973 to 1979 (board member 1964 to 1979, vice chairman 1966 to 1973).

Steinby was married from 1936 to 1982 to Gunnel Steinby (born Gunnel Alexandra Waselius) and father of Ann-Gerd Steinby

== Bibliography ==
Steinby published several articles and studies.

- 1945 – The Eternal City in Finland's Poetry (special edition from Nordisk Tidskrift)
- 1951 – Finland in the Eternal City (Amos Andersons förlag)
- 1953 – Roman Pictures (with drawings by Henrik Tikkanen)
- 1953 – Villa Lante (published by the Institutum Romanum Finlandiae, expanded edition 1957)
- 1954 – Villa Lante ai Gianicolo (together with Adriano Prandi)
- 1956 – Roman Journalism: Written News Service and Opinion in the Time of Cicero (academic thesis)
- 1958 – On Gianicolo (friend letter to Amos Anderson on his birthday, September 3, 1958)
- 1963 – Finland's Newspaper Press: A Historical Overview (published by the Swedish Federation of Finnish Associations, the Sponsored Town Movement in the series Finland Today, revised edition 1964)
- 1970 – Peter Forsskål and Thoughts on Civil Freedom (Hufvudstadsbladet)
- 1972 – In quest of freedom: Finland's press 1771-1971 (translated from the manuscript by Fred A. Fewster, published by the author)
- 1977 – Insurance Magazine 1905–1913
- 1979 – Amos Anderson (The Association The Art Society's publication series 2)
- 1988 – Johan Jakob Nervander in Sweden
- 1989 – Research and Knowledge
- 1991 – Johan Jakob Nervander
- 1992 – Eleven Essays
- 1993 – J.J. Nervander and Jephtha's Book

Edited works

- 1945 – Roman Years and Memories: A Book about Finland in Rome
- 1958–1977 – Historical and Literary Historical Studies (volumes 33–52)
- 1968 – Zacharias Topelius: Notes from Helsinki, which has passed
- 1970 – Swedish Fashion Words (edited together with Olav Panelius)

Translations

- 1942 – Jalmari Jaakkoja: Finland's Eastern Problems (Suomen idänkysymys) (Wahlström & Widstrand)
- 1956 – Bruno Cicognani: I, the King (Yo, el rey, Filippo) (Söderström)

== Awards and distinctions ==
- 1980 – Prize from the Society of Swedish Literature in Finland
- 1984 – Tollander Prize
- 1986 – Swedish Academy Finland Prize
