= Erik Kruskopf =

Finnish-Swedish art critic and historian (1930–2026)

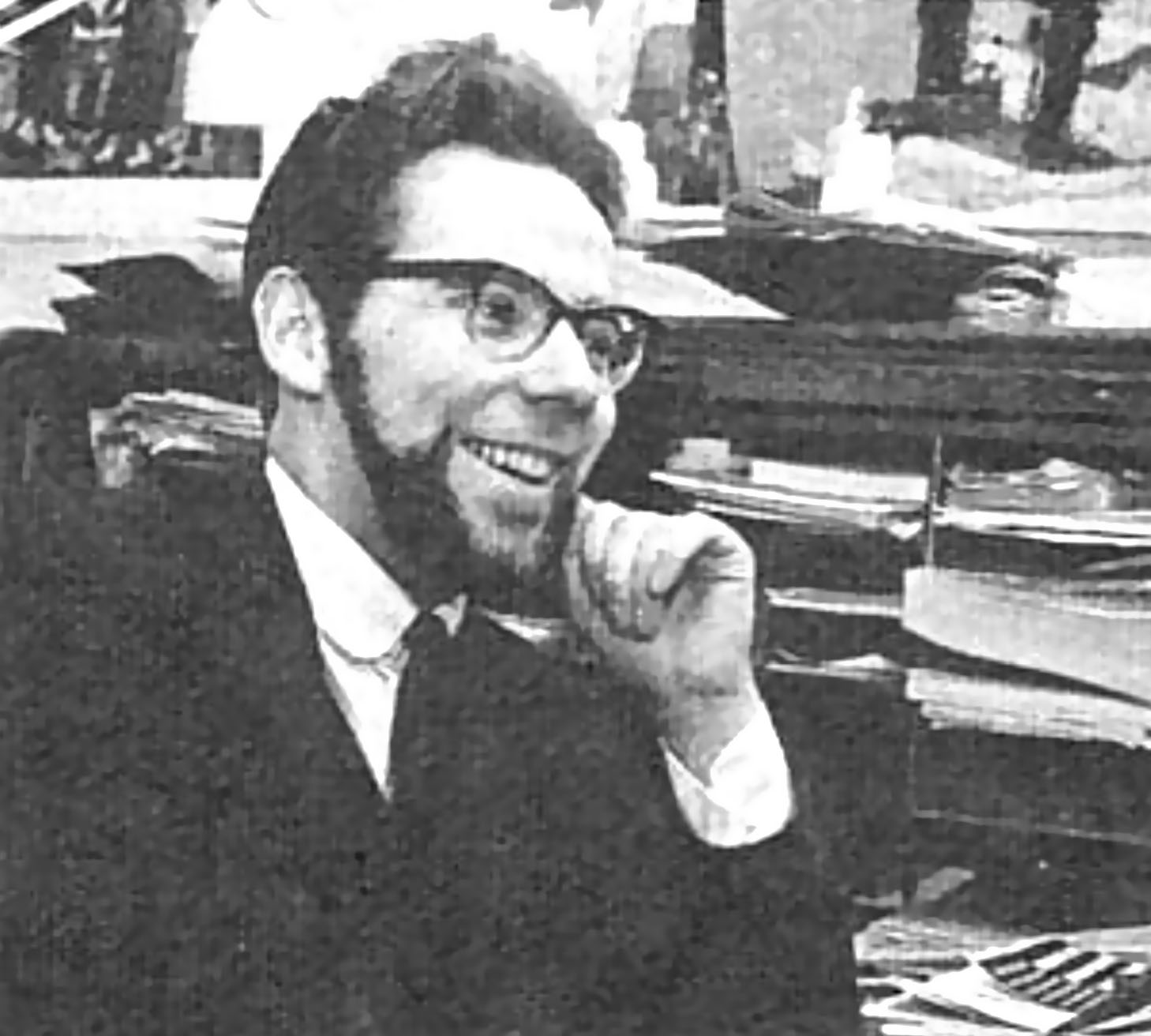
- Born: 29 August 1930; Helsinki, Finland
- Died: 9 April 2026 (aged 95); Siuntio, Finland
- Occupations: Art critic, art historian and writer

Erik Georg Ragnar Kruskopf (29 August 1930 – 9 April 2026) was a Finnish art critic, art historian and writer.

== Life and career ==
A member of Finland's Swedish-speaking community, Kruskopf was director of the Nordic Art Centre (Nordiska Konstförbundet) near Helsinki. He was assistant director at the Finnish National Opera, culture editor at the Finnish newspaper Hufvudstadsbladet, and art history professor at the University of Tromsø. In 1984, he curated an exhibition at the Mingei International Museum, California, of artefacts made by the Sámi peoples.

He was awarded the Tollander’s Prize in 2001.

Kruskopf died on 9 April 2026, at the age of 95.

== Writing ==
- Finnish Design, 1875-1975. A 100 Years of Finnish Industrial Design. Visual History (1975)
- Eila Hiltunen, sculptor (1976)
- Several books about the artist and author Tove Jansson, including Skämttecknaren Tove ("Cartoonist Tove", 1995)
- Människan och målaren ("The Human and The Painter") (with Ulla-Lena Lundberg), a biography of the painter Åke Hellman published for Hellman's 90th birthday in 2005
- Alvar Aalto kuvataiteilijana ("Alvar Aalto [architect and designer] as visual artist", 2011)
- Constructors of Light, the exhibition catalogue for a 2012 exhibition of Finnish artists of the 1940s and 1950s held at the Amos Rex museum in Helsinki
