= Max Engman =

Finnish historian and professor (1945–2020)

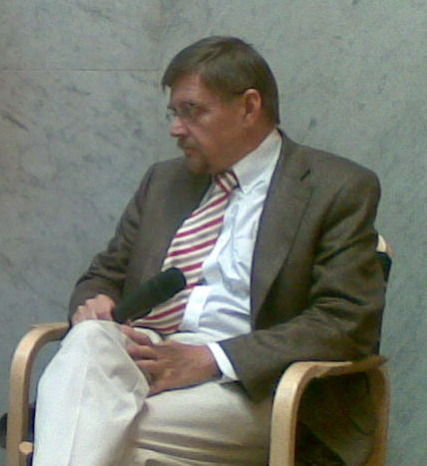
- Max Robert Engman
- Born: Max Robert Engman; 27 September 1945; Helsinki, Finland
- Died: 19 March 2020 (aged 74); Helsinki, Finland
- Occupations: Historian, professor, editor
- Employer: Åbo Akademi
- Known for: Research on Finnish–Russian relations; editor-in-chief of Historisk Tidskrift för Finland

Max Robert Engman (27 September 1945 – 19 March 2020) was a Finland Swede historian and professor of general history at Åbo Akademi, remembered for his research on Finnish–Russian relations, the history of European empires, and the transition from Swedish to Russian rule in Finland. He served as editor-in-chief of Historisk Tidskrift för Finland for nearly thirty years and was chairman of the Svenska litteratursällskapet i Finland from 2010.

== Biography ==
=== Early life and education ===
Engman was born in Helsinki on 27 September 1945. He studied history at the University of Helsinki.

=== Career ===
From 1968 to 1972 he held various positions at the National Archives of Finland in Helsinki. In 1983 he published his doctoral dissertation S:t Petersburg och Finland. Migration och influens 1703–1917, which drew on previously unexplored archival material and migration theory to demonstrate the decisive importance of the rapidly growing city of St. Petersburg for the economy and social development of southern Finland during the imperial era. In 1985 he was appointed professor of general history at Åbo Akademi, a post he held for a quarter of a century.

Engman's research centred on Finnish–Russian relations and the history of European empires. To broaden his perspective on the dissolution of empires and multinational states, he made several research visits to Vienna to study the collapse of the Habsburg monarchy into a series of smaller nation states. His contributions as sub-editor for Historisk Tidskrift för Finland from 1972 to 1982 and as editor-in-chief from 1982 to 2000 are considered significant.

His most acclaimed work, Lejonet och dubbelörnen. Finlands imperiella decennier 1830–1890 (2000), demonstrated how extensively Finns had participated in and benefited from the construction and expansion of the Russian Empire.

He died in Helsinki on 19 March 2020.

=== Awards and honours ===
Engman received the Hallbergska priset in 1984, the Swedish Academy Finland Prize in 1994, and Hertig Karls pris in 2009. He was elected a member of the Finnish Society of Sciences and Letters in 1993 and of the Royal Swedish Academy of Letters, History and Antiquities in 2008.

== Bibliography ==
- Mannen i kolboxen, 1979
- S:t Petersburg och Finland, 1983
- Förvaltningen och utvandringen till Ryssland 1809–1917, 1995
- Petersburgska vägar, 1995
- Norden och flyttningarna under nya tiden, 1997
- Lejonet och dubbelörnen, 2000
- Gränsfall: Utväxlingar och gränstrafik på Karelska näset 1918–1920, 2007
- Ett långt farväl. Finland mellan Sverige och Ryssland, 2009
