= Bo Lönnqvist =

Finland-Swedish ethnologist (born 1941)

- Born: Bo Hjalmar Lönnqvist; 29 September 1941; Esbo, Finland
- Occupations: Ethnologist, professor
- Employer: University of Jyväskylä
- Known for: Finland-Swedish folk culture; costume history; children's culture
- Spouse: Camilla Marianne Elisabeth Schauman (m. 1972)

Bo Hjalmar Lönnqvist (born 29 September 1941) is a Finland Swede ethnologist and one of Finland's foremost scholars in the field. He is known for his research combining detailed empirical work with theoretical curiosity, covering Finland-Swedish traditions, folk costume, children's culture, manor house culture, industrial environments and ethnicity.

== Biography ==
=== Early life and education ===
Lönnqvist grew up in Nordsjö in Helsinge parish and showed an early interest in folk culture in Nyland. Already at the age of 15 he was collecting ethnological material and serving as a local correspondent for the National Board of Antiquities' ethnological questionnaires from 1956 to 1964. He began his studies at the University of Helsinki in 1960, initially with Nordic languages as his main subject, before switching to Finno-Ugric ethnography. He completed his doctorate in 1972 with a dissertation on folk costume and fashion in a rural community in Vörå 1870–1920.

=== Career ===
Lönnqvist worked as an archivist at the Folk Culture Archive from 1966 to 1973, then as a researcher at the Academy of Finland from 1973 to 1990. He served as a visiting professor at the University of Oslo in 1991–1992 and as professor of ethnology at the University of Jyväskylä from 1995 to 2004. He has also held visiting professorships in Germany (2001) and at Stockholm University (2007).

His book Ting, rum och barn (Things, Space and Children, 1992) views children's world as created by the children themselves and endowed with magical dimensions that place it outside the adult world; it was awarded the State Prize for Information Dissemination in 1993. Together with Anna-Maria Åström and Yrsa Lindqvist he co-authored Gränsfolkets barn (Children of the Border People, 2001), exploring Finland-Swedish identity from an ethnological perspective, which received the same prize in 2002.

Since 1986 he has been a member of the Finnish Society of Sciences and Letters.

He is the brother of Barbara Lönnqvist.

== Selected bibliography ==
- Dräkt och mode i ett landsbygdssamhälle 1870–1920 (1972)
- Finländskt herrgårdsliv (1978)
- Suomenruotsalaiset (1981)
- Folkkulturens skepnader. Till folkdräktens genealogi (1991)
- Ting, rum och barn (1992)
- Bakelser. En studie i lyxens kulturella formspråk (1997)
- Industrisamhälle och arbetarkultur (1998)
- Gränsfolkets barn (with A.-M. Åström & Y. Lindqvist, 2001)
- En finsk adelssläkts öden. Standertskjöld – Standertskjöld-Nordenstam (2006)
- Maktspel i kläder (2008)

== Awards ==
- 1993 – State Prize for Information Dissemination
- 2001 – SFV Cultural Prize
- 2002 – State Prize for Information Dissemination
- 2003 – Bergbomska priset
- 2014 – Tollanderska priset
