= Paletten =

Swedish art magazine

- Editor-in-Chief: Fredrik Svensk
- Categories: art magazines
- Frequency: quarterly
- Founder: Gothenburg Artists Club
- Founded: 1940; 85 years ago
- Company: Stiftelsen Paletten
- Country: Sweden
- Based in: Gothenburg
- Language: Swedish
- Website: www.paletten.net
- ISSN: 0031-0352
- OCLC: 1761787

Paletten is Sweden's oldest and longest-running art magazine, now in its eighth decade of continuous production. It is published quarterly, primarily in Swedish but with a few articles in English, by Stiftelsen Paletten (the Paletten Foundation), located in Gothenburg.

Initially Paletten concerned itself primarily with local issues but, over time, broadened its scope to feature national and international art. Paletten often collaborates with selected artists in producing each new issue.

== History ==
Paletten is based in Gothenburg, Sweden, where it was founded in 1940. For many years it was published by the Gothenburg Artists Club. Among the first members of its editorial staff were painters Nils Nilsson and Ragnar Sandberg of the Göteborgskoloristerna group as well as Hjalmar Eldh and C.T. Holmström. The magazine's first editor-in-chief was Gunnar Wallin.

In addition to its primary focus on art, Paletten has also published poems and essays by leading Swedish authors including Erik Blomberg, Karin Boye, Gunnar Ekelöf, and Nobel Prize laureate Harry Martinson. Editors of Paletten have included Torsten Bergmark, Rabbe Enckell, Folke Edwards, Leif Nylén, Gertrud Gustavsson (Sandqvist), Hans Johansson, and Isabella Nilsson. From 1971–78, Håkan Wettre produced the periodical as managing editor.

From the mid-1990s, Paletten worked with guest editors who were curators, artists or critics and who brought an individual touch to each issue. These editors included Maria Lind, Ernst Billgren, Jan Håfström, John Sundkvist, Peter Cornell, Tom Sandqvist, Jan-Erik Lundström, and Mika Hannula. Since 2002, regular editors have included: Cecilia Gelin, Anna van der Vliet, and Sophie Allgårdh.

In March 2011, Milou Allerholm, Sinziana Ravini, and Fredrik Svensk became the new editors-in-chief, and the first issue by the editorial team came out in June 2011. Thereafter, Ravini, and Fredrik Svensk continued as a duo, later joined by a group of contributing editors. These are Maja Hammarén, Laura Hatfield, Salad Hilowle, Hanni Kamaly, Andria Nyberg Forshage, Frida Sandström, Johannes Björk, Gabo Camnitzer, Andreas Christakis, Anton Göransson and Patrik Haggren. The board consists of Majsa Allelin, Corina Oprea, Cecilia Suhaid Gustafsson, Maja Hammarén, Linda Östergaard and Jan-Erik Lundström (chairperson).
