= Karin Allardt Ekelund =

Swedish-Finnish literary historian (1895–1990)

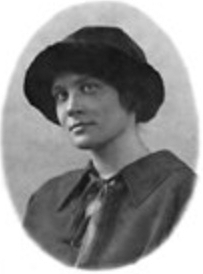
Karin Allardt Ekelund

Karin Allardt Ekelund (4 September 1895, Porvoo – 13 June 1990, Helsinki) was a Swedish-speaking Finnish literary historian and pedagogue. Her parents were schoolmaster and writer Anders Allardt and art teacher Johanna Elisabet Strömborg. In 1937 she married the artist Ragnar Ekelund (1892- 1960).

She dedicated her life to studying Fredrika Runeberg. Her doctoral dissertation from 1943 was titled Fredrika Runeberg. En biografisk och litteraturhistorisk studie. The work was translated into Finnish by Helmer Winter and E. A. Saarimaa in 1945, and an abridged version adapted by Clara Snellman-Borenius was published in 1957. She was an active advocate of Swedish identity in Finland and worked for justice, women’s rights, peace, and a better future in a society free from fear.

== Career and education ==
Allardt Ekelund graduated from the Privata svenska fruntimmerskolan in Porvoo in 1914. She attended the University of Helsinki, receiving her Candidate of Philosophy degree in 1928, her Licentiate of Philosophy in 1942, and her Doctor of Philosophy in 1943.

Her career began as a proofreader for the Holger Schildt publishing house from 1918 to 1928. She then worked as a teacher of Swedish and history at Tölö svenska samskola from 1930 to 1942, serving as the school's rector from 1933 to 1937. She later taught at Laguska skolan from 1942 to 1960. From 1952 to 1965, she was the curator of the J.L. Runeberg Home Museum in Porvoo. She was also on the board of the Society of Swedish Authors in Finland during the 1930s.

== Awards and honours ==
- Granberg Prize (1943)
- Honorary member of the Swedish Literature Society in Finland (1969)
- Tollander Prize (1972)

== Works ==
=== Writings ===
- Fredrika Runeberg. En biografisk och litteraturhistorisk studie (Doctoral dissertation). Helsinki: Helsingin yliopisto. 1942. (Also published as Skrifter utgivna av Svenska litteratursällskapet i Finland 291).
- Ludvig Mikael Runeberg. En kameskärare under förra seklet. Helsinki. 1950. (Frenckellska tryckeri aktiebolagets publikationsserie 3).
- I Spanien. Drawings by Ragnar Ekelund. Helsinki. 1962.
- Traneplogar. Porvoo. 1977.

=== Translations ===
- Bahr, Hermann. Teater. En wienroman. Helsinki. 1919.
- Mann, Thomas. Underbarnet. Helsinki. 1920.
- Keyserling, E. von. En stilla vrå. Helsinki. 1921. (Schildts 10 marks böcker 19).
- Dominik, Hans. Den hemlighetsfulla kraften. En roman från år 1955. Helsinki. 1924.
- Reinheimer, Sophie. Om sol och regn och himmelens vindar. Illustrated by Signe Hammarsten-Jansson. Helsinki & Uppsala. 1925.
- Holst, Bertha. Henriks syster Mariotta. Helsinki & Stockholm. 1926.

=== Edited works ===
- Strömborg, J.E. Biografiska anteckningar om Johan Ludvig Runeberg. Supplementband 1860–1877. Prepared by Allardt based on Strömborg's posthumous diary entries. Helsinki. 1927 (Skrifter utgivna av Svenska litteratursällskapet i Finland 192).
- Strömborg, J.E. Biografiska anteckningar om Johan Ludvig Runeberg. 1–3. 1804–1837. Helsinki. 1928 (Skrifter utgivna av Svenska litteratursällskapet i Finland 202).
- Strömborg, J.E. Biografiska anteckningar om Johan Ludvig Runeberg. 4:1. 1837–1845. Helsinki. 1929 (Skrifter utgivna av Svenska litteratursällskapet i Finland 209).
- Strömborg, J.E. Biografiska anteckningar om Johan Ludvig Runeberg 4:2. Helsinki. 1931 (Skrifter utgivna av Svenska Litteratursällskapet i Finland 225).
- G. Montgomerys egenhändiga beskrifning öfver sin resa till Finland. With annotations by Karin Allardt. Helsinki. 1931. (Skrifter utgivna av Svenska litteratursällskapet i Finland 220; Historiska och litteraturhistoriska studier 7).
- Allardt, Anders. Byberättelser. Selected by Karin Allardt Ekelund. Porvoo. 1944.
- Runeberg, Fredrika. Teckningar och drömmar. Selected by Karin Allardt Ekelund. Tampere. 1944.
- Runeberg, Fredrika. Anteckningar om Runeberg. Min pennas saga. Helsinki. 1946. (Skrifter utgivna av Svenska litteratursällskapet i Finland 310).
- Folkliv i finlandssvensk diktning. Selection and introduction. Tampere. 1951.
- Från Tavaststjerna till Dagerman. Ett prosaurval. Helsinki. 1958.
- Wecksell, Josef Julius. Samlade dikter. With introduction and commentary. Turku. 1962. (Finlandssvensk vitterhet; Skrifter utgivna av Svenska litteratursällskapet i Finland 395).
- Strömborg, Johan Elias. Runebergs hem i Borgå. Porvoo. 1963.
- Frans Michael Franzéns Åbodiktning. Selection and introduction. Porvoo. 1969. (Finlandssvensk vitterhet; Skrifter utgivna av Svenska litteratursällskapet i Finland 431).
- Runeberg, Fredrika. Brev till sonen Walter 1861–1879. Köpenhamn, Rom, Paris. Introduction and commentary. Porvoo. 1971. (Skrifter utgivna av Svenska litteratursällskapet i Finland 447).
