= Christer Kihlman =

Finland-Swedish author (1930–2021)

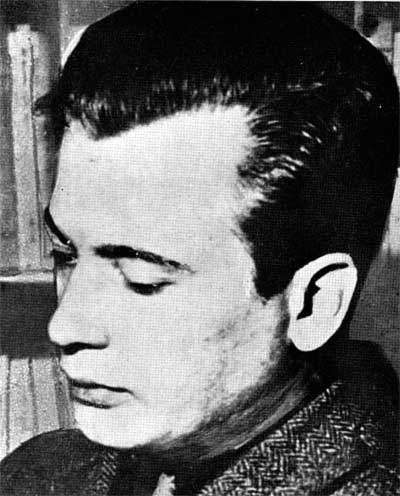
- Christer Kihlman c. 1960
- Born: Christer Alfred Kihlman; 14 June 1930; Helsinki, Finland
- Died: 8 March 2021 (aged 90); Helsinki, Finland
- Occupations: Author, literary critic
- Spouse: Maja Selinda Johanna Enckell (1956–2021)
- Writing career
- Language: Finland Swedish

Christer Alfred Kihlman (14 June 1930 – 8 March 2021) was a Finland-Swedish author and literary critic.

== Biography ==
Christer Kihlman was born 14 June 1930 in Helsinki, Finland, the son of Bertel Lorenzo Kihlman, author and master of philosophy, and Karin Elisabeth Bolinder, grandson of Lorenzo Kihlman (1861–1949) and great-grandson of Alfred Kihlman. Kihlman graduated from Svenska normallyceum in 1948 and studied at Helsinki University from 1948 to 1953. He debuted in 1951 as a poet, but in 1960 switched to prose with the acclaimed novel Se upp Salige!, which takes place in the fictional small town of Lexå (a slightly disguised Borgå, where he lived at the time), filled with isolation and provincialism. With The Blue Mother he began a series about tense family relationships and the abysses of the human soul, which culminated in the acclaimed novels The Precious Prince and The Downfall of Gerdt Bladh.

Christer Kihlman's output was very sporadic since the late 1980s due to persistent writing cramps, but after 2000 he began to participate in the public debate again with sporadic newspaper articles and occasional lectures. From 1993 to 2017 he and his wife Selinda Kihlman lived in the Diktarhemmet in Borgå, which has been an honorary residence for Finland-Swedish writers since 1921.

His books have been translated into Finnish, Danish, English, Estonian, Norwegian, Russian, Czech and German.

In addition to his writing, Christer Kihlman has worked for some periods as a librarian at the Helsinki City Library from 1948 to 1953 and as a journalist. He was editor-in-chief of the magazine Arena from 1951 to 1954, literary critic at Nya Pressen from 1952 to 1960, editor of Nya Argus from 1961 to 1982 and has written articles and columns in Helsingin Sanomat, Dagens Nyheter and Ny Tid.

He held the title of artist professor from 1975 to 1980, was a member of the State Literature Commission from 1971 to 1973, and his writing has been awarded, among others, the Litteraturfrämjandet's Great Novel Prize in 1972, the Finnish State Literature Prize in 1976, the Thanks for the Book Award in 1976, the Swedish Literature Society prize in 1976 and 1983, the Swedish Academy of Finland Prize in 1976, the Längmanska Cultural Foundation Prize in 1986, the Tollanderska Prize in 1988 and the Artium Cultori Prize in 2000. In 2017, Kihlman donated his archive to the Swedish Literature Society in Finland, where it is available for research.

Kihlman died 8 March 2021 in Helsinki.

== Prizes and awards ==
- 1961 – Albert Bonnier Scholarship Fund for Younger and More Recent Authors
- 1964 – Finnish State Literature Prize
- 1966 – Tollander Prize
- 1970 – Finnish State Literature Prize
- 1970 – Längmanska Cultural Foundation Prize
- 1970 – State Dramatist Prize
- 1972 – The Finnish Literature Promotion Association's Great Novel Prize
- 1972 – Thanks for the Book Award
- 1972 – Swedish Literary Society of Finland Prize
- 1975 – Finnish State Literary Prize
- 1976 – Swedish Academy of Finland Prize
- 1976 – Finnish State Literary Prize
- 1976 – Swedish Literary Society of Finland Prize
- 1976 –Thanks for the Book Award
- 1983 – Swedish Literary Society of Finland Prize
- 1986 – Längmanska kulturfonden's prize
- 1988 – Tolland Prize
- 2000 – Artium Cultori Award
- 2003 – Pro Finlandia Medal
- 1976 – Swedish Academy of Finland Prize
