= Erik Allardt =

Finnish sociologist (1925–2020)

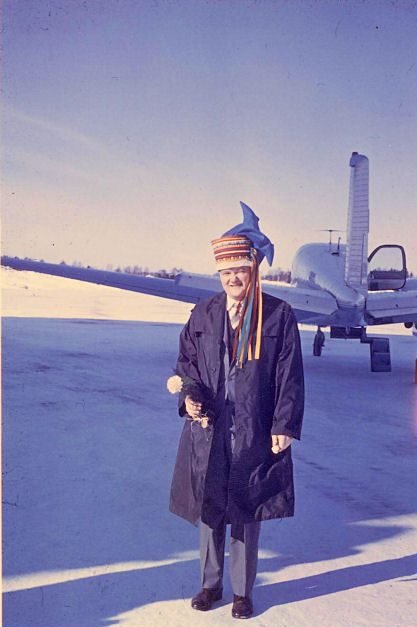
Erik Allardt in 1962.

Erik Anders Allardt (9 August 1925 – 25 August 2020) was a Finnish sociologist and one of the most distinguished social scientists in Finland and the Nordic countries during the 20th century. He served as professor of sociology at the University of Helsinki from 1958 to 1991, and as chancellor of Åbo Akademi University from 1992 to 1994. He introduced empirical sociology to Finland and exercised considerable influence on public debate, particularly during the 1960s and 1970s. Internationally, he is best known for his welfare model with the three dimensions having, loving and being, and for his comparative research on political radicalism and linguistic minorities. In 1995, Allardt was awarded the honorary title of akateemikko.

== Biography ==
=== Background and intellectual formation ===
In his intellectual autobiography Bondtur och kulturchocker (1995), Allardt described his path to sociology. Growing up in a home marked by social commitment, and shaped by his experiences during the war years, he was drawn to the social sciences. Decisive impulses came through studies in European depth psychology and Swedish social liberalism, and through his acquaintance with Veli Verkko, Finland's first professor of sociology.

Allardt distanced himself early from nationalist romanticism and from a paternalistic approach to social policy. His scholarly stance was characterised by critical inquiry rather than deference to established truths. By his own account, the central questions in his research were the relationship between the individual and society, and the tension between rational and emotional factors in human behaviour. Alongside social structure, he emphasised the importance of social relations, symbolic environments, and individuals' goals and aspirations.

=== Academic career ===
Allardt was appointed professor of sociology at the University of Helsinki in 1958. He became a leading figure in Finnish sociology and a mentor to several generations of researchers. Over the course of his career he published 20 books and more than 600 articles. From 1970 to 1980 he was one of the first research professors at the newly established Academy of Finland.

Allardt gained a reputation as one of the foremost debaters and teachers in Finnish social science. He served as opponent at more than 40 doctoral defences, and was a visiting professor at several universities and an expert adviser in many international assignments.

He became a fellow of the Finnish Society of Sciences and Letters in 1961, and an honorary fellow in 1988. In 1971 he was elected a member of the Finnish Academy of Science and Letters. He was a fellow of the Norwegian Academy of Science and Letters from 1982. In 1984 he was awarded an honorary doctorate by Uppsala University. In 1986 he was appointed chair of the scientific council of the Academy of Finland, a position he held for two three-year terms, during which the Academy's standing and its relations with the universities were strengthened. In 1995 he was awarded the honorary title of akateemikko.

=== Scholarly contributions ===
Allardt's doctoral dissertation on divorce is regarded as the real breakthrough of modern sociology in Finland. The study examined how different normative systems affected divorce rates, and introduced a theoretical approach that was new to Finnish sociological research.

In the late 1950s, Allardt co-authored a sociology textbook with Yrjö Littunen that summarised a new sociological perspective strongly influenced by North American sociology. The book served as a standard work in sociology in Finland and the other Nordic countries for several decades.

His book Yhteiskunnan rakenne ja sosiaalinen paine (1964; Swedish edition Samhällsstruktur och sociala spänningar) had a wide impact on both sociology and public debate in Finland. Drawing on Émile Durkheim's theory of the division of labour, Allardt analysed social institutions and conflicts in relation to the degree of labour differentiation and pressures for social homogeneity, covering topics such as religion, nationalism, internationalisation and deviance.

Allardt's international breakthrough came in the 1960s through his research on Finnish communism. He drew an analytical distinction between what he termed wilderness communism and industrial communism, studying their relation to the division of labour, social norms and group identities.

His most internationally recognised contribution is his welfare model with the three dimensions having, loving and being — covering material living conditions, social relations, and opportunities for self-realisation respectively. The model, developed through a major comparative study of the Nordic welfare systems, extended the concept of welfare beyond material measures to include individuals' and groups' values, feelings and attitudes. It remains the most widely cited theoretical framework developed by a Finnish social scientist.

Allardt continued his comparative work with a study of linguistic minorities in Europe, in which he anticipated many of the ethnic minority conflicts that would later emerge across the continent.

=== Family ===
Allardt was the grandson of philologist Ivar Heikel. His father was Arvid Allardt, a jurist, and his mother Marita Ingeborg Heikel, a primary school teacher. He married Sagi Nylander in 1947.

== Selected bibliography ==
- Social struktur och politisk aktivitet (1956)
- Sociologi (with Yrjö Littunen, 1962)
- Yhteiskunnan rakenne ja sosiaalinen paine (1964; Swedish: Samhällsstruktur och sociala spänningar)
- Att ha, att älska, att vara: om välfärd i Norden (1975)
- Språkgränser och samhällsstruktur (with Christian Starck, 1981)
- Bondtur och kulturchocker (1995)

== Awards and honours ==
- 1971 – Member of the Finnish Academy of Science and Letters
- 1982 – Fellow of the Norwegian Academy of Science and Letters
- 1984 – Honorary doctorate, Uppsala University
- 1985 – Swedish Academy Finland Prize
- 1988 – Honorary fellow of the Finnish Society of Sciences and Letters
- 1995 – Honorary title akateemikko
- 1996 – Tollander Prize
