= Historisk Tidskrift för Finland =

- Discipline: History
- Language: Swedish
- Edited by: Jennica Thylin-Klaus

Publication details
- History: 1916–present
- Publisher: Historiska föreningen (Finland)
- Frequency: 4 issues per year
- Open access: Delayed, 1 year

Standard abbreviations
- ISO 4: Hist. Tidskr. Finl.

Indexing
- ISSN: 0046-7596

Links
- Journal homepage

Historisk Tidskrift för Finland ('Historical Journal for Finland') is a Swedish-language Finnish history journal which has been published by the Historiska föreningen ('Historical society') since 1916. It was founded in 1916 by Per Olof (P. O.) von Törne, who had founded the Svenska studenters historiska förening ('Swedish students' historical society', which later became Historiska föreningen) two years earlier. He served as the journal's editor until 1924. With support for translation from the Delegation for the Promotion of Swedish Literature, managed by the Society of Swedish Literature in Finland, the journal is now also a forum for Finnish-speaking historians. The journal is published four times a year and has approximately 550 subscribers, primarily from Finland, the Nordic countries, and the Baltic region. Each paper is reviewed by two external referees.

Historisk Tidskrift för Finland is available on the Federation of Finnish Learned Societies' website as an Open Access publication (ISSN 2343-2888) as of the 1990 issues. New editions are published on HTF DIGITALT with a one-year delay.

== Editors-in-chief ==
- 1916–1924 Per Olof von Törne
- 1925–1969 Eric Anthoni
- 1970–1981 Jarl Gallén
- 1982–2000 Max Engman
- 2001–2016 Lars-Folke Landgrén
- 2017– Jennica Thylin-Klaus
