= Johan Wrede =

Finnish literary historian (born 1935)

Johan Otto Wilhelm Wrede
- Born: October 18, 1935 (age 90); Helsinki, Finland

Academic work
- Discipline: History
- Institutions: University of Helsinki

Johan Otto Wilhelm Wrede (born 18 October 1935) is a Finnish literary historian.

He was born in Helsinki. He earned his doctorate in 1965 and worked for three years for the Humanist Commission. In 1968 he became a docent of Swedish literature at the University of Helsinki, advancing to professor in 1969 and serving until 1995. Among his academic specialties were J. L. Runeberg.

Wrede served as vice prorector of the University of Helsinki from 1983 to 1989, and was a board member of the Society of Swedish Literature in Finland from 1967 to 2000, the last eight years as chairman. He is a member of the Norwegian Academy of Science and Letters. He was awarded the Swedish Academy Finland Prize in 1991.
