= Monika Fagerholm =

Finnish writer

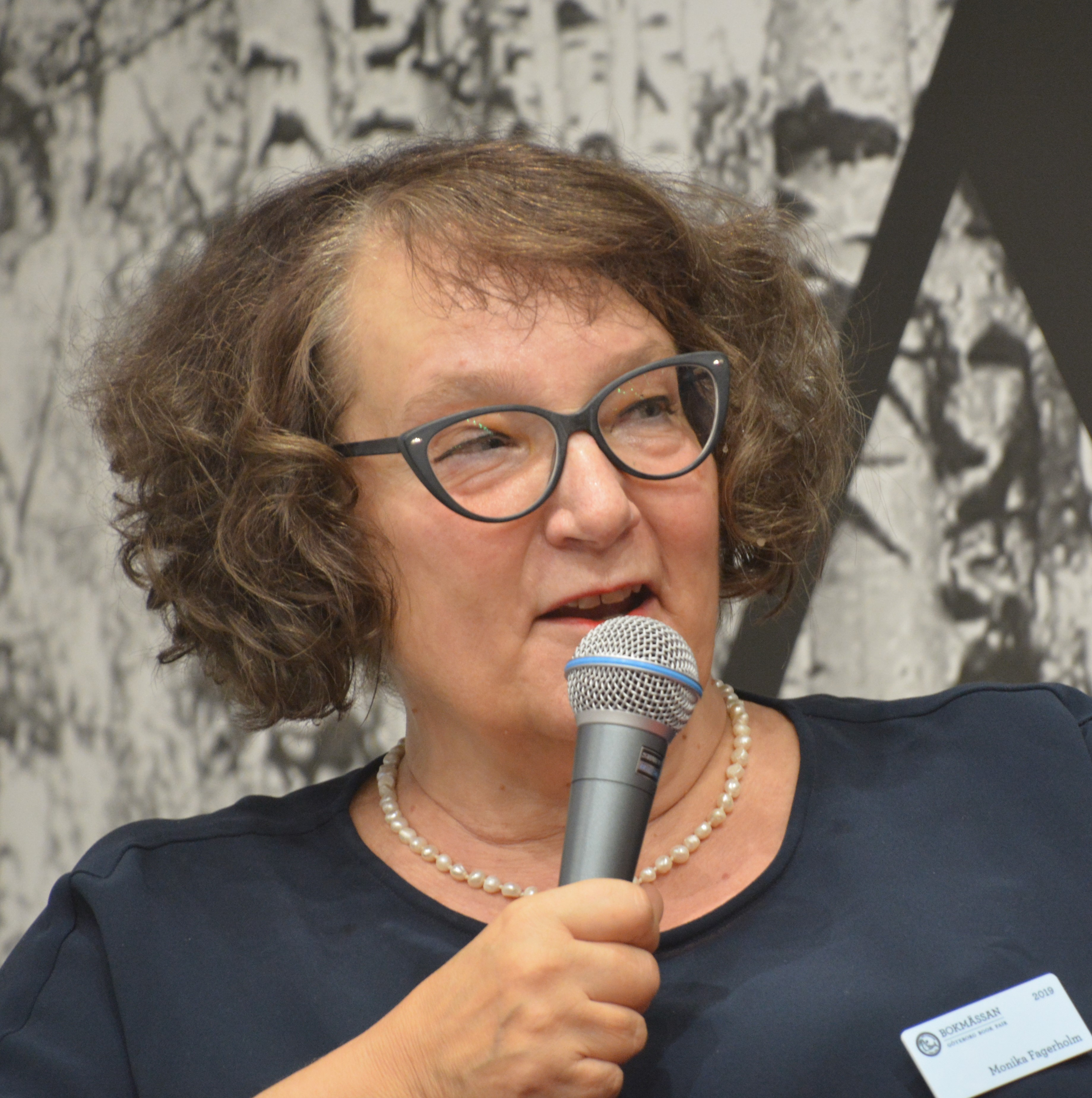
- Monika Fagerholm at Gothenburg Book Fair in 2019
- Born: 26 February 1961 (age 65)
- Occupation: Literary Novelist
- Writing career
- Genres: high literary, prose
- Subjects: pop, cult, teenage,
- Notable works: Den amerikanska flickan, Underbara kvinnor vid vatten
- Website: www.salomonssonagency.com/authors.php?id=7&bookId=31&collection=no

Monika Kristina Fagerholm (born 26 February 1961 in Helsinki) is a Swedish-speaking Finnish author living in Ekenäs, Finland.

She is the daughter of professor Nils-Erik Fagerholm and library amanuensis Kristina Herrgård. Fagerholm has studied psychology and literature at the University of Helsinki. In 1987, she received her bachelor's degree in psychology and literature.

Fagerholm made her debut in 1987 with Sham but her real breakthrough in the literary scene was in 1994 with Underbara kvinnor vid vatten. (Wonderful women by the water). The novel is set in early 60's, and details the couple Isabella and Kajus, who together with their son Thomas, rent a house by the sea. Suddenly, the arrival of new neighbors changes Isabella's life. The Ängel family has lived in the States, and together with wife Rosa Ängel, Isabella turns into something like Jackie Kennedy.

The novel has been called a generational novel for anyone growing up in the 60's. The book was nominated for the Finlandia Prize, which is the biggest literary prize in Finland. It was also nominated for the August Prize in 1995, in Sweden and also the International Dublin Literary Award in 1998. In 1994, she received the Runeberg Award in Finland. The movie adaptation of the novel by Claes Olsson premiered in 1998. Fagerholm received the August prize in 2005 for Den amerikanska flickan (The American Girl).

== Bibliography ==
- Sham (short stories) 1987
- Patricia (short stories) 1990
- Underbara kvinnor vid vatten 1994
- Diva 1998
- Den amerikanska flickan 2005
- Glitterscenen 2009
- Lola uppochner 2012
- Vem dödade bambi? 2019
- Döda trakten/kvinnor i revolt 2025

== Prizes and awards ==
- Runeberg Award (1995), in Finland for Underbara kvinnor vid vatten
- Thanks for the Book Award (Tack för boken-medaljen) (1995) for Underbara kvinnor vid vatten
- August Prize (2005) for Den amerikanska flickan
- Aniara prize (2005)
- Göteborgs-Postens literary award (2005)
- The Swedish Literature Society Award (2005)
- Swedish Academy Nordic Prize (2016)
- Finlandia Prize (2025) for Döda trakten / Kvinnor i revolt

In addition, Den amerikanska flickan was shortlisted for the Nordic Council Literature Prize 2004 and the Runeberg Award 2004.
