= Erik Furuhjelm =

Finnish composer, violinist and writer

Erik Gustaf Furuhjelm (1883–1964) was a Finnish composer, violinist, and writer.

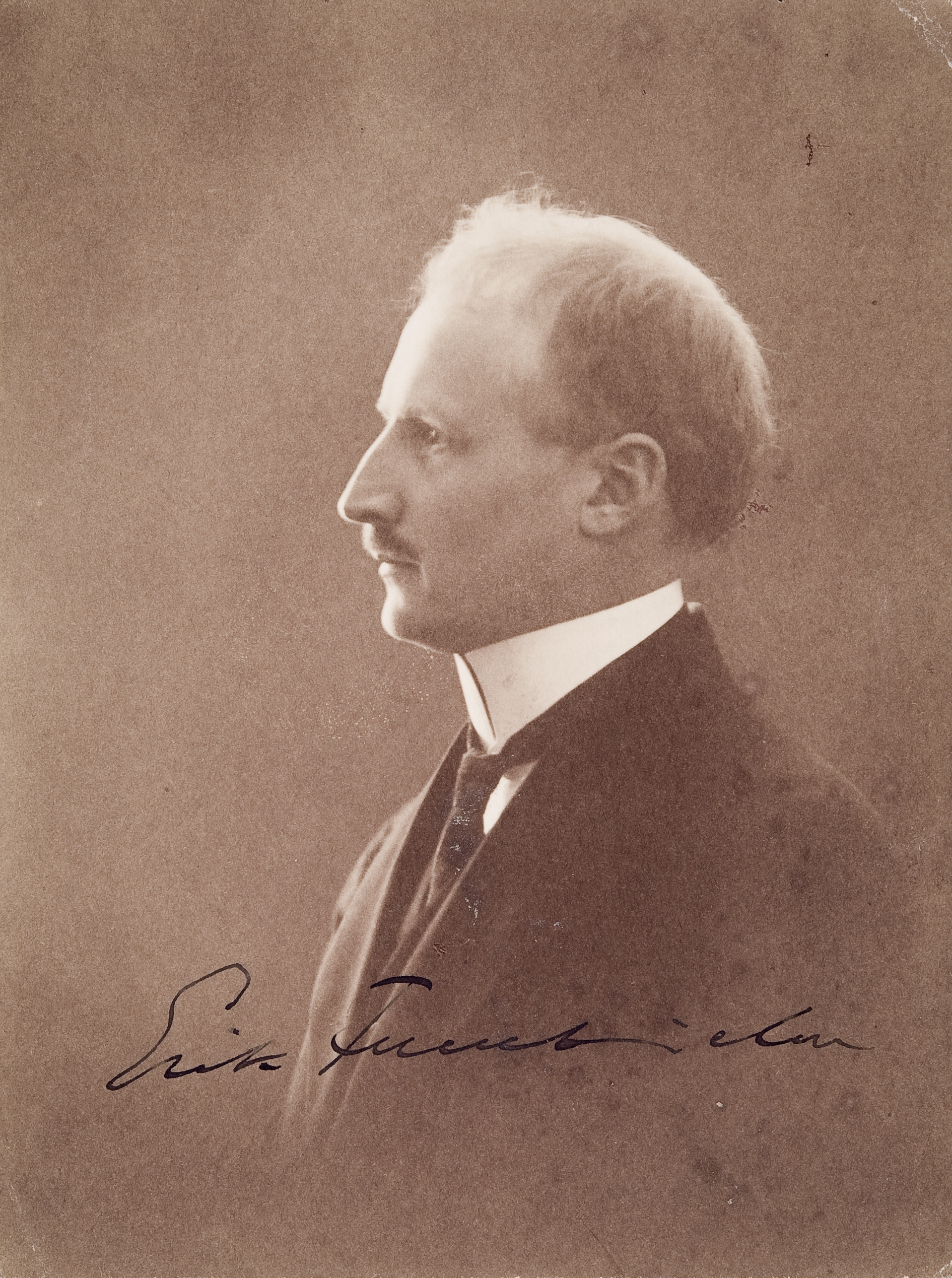
Erik-Furuhjelm

== Biography ==
Erik Furuhjelm was born on 6 July 1883, in Helsinki and died in the same city on 13 June 1964. His parents were Elis Furuhjelm, Secretary of Protocol for the Senate, and Selma Gabriela Antell. He was the brother of the astronomer and politician Ragnar Furuhjelm.

Erik Furuhjelm entered high school in 1901, studied at the Philharmonic Society's orchestral school from 1893, at the Sibelius Academy from 1901 to 1906, at the University of Helsinki from 1901 to 1902, and in Vienna and Munich from 1906 to 1907 and in Paris from 1908 to 1909.

Erik Furuhjelm served as acting director of the Sibelius Academy. He held the positions of Professor 1905–1906, professor 1907–1935, and assistant director 1920–1935. Erik Furuhjelm gave numerous concerts, conducted choirs, and played viola in concerts with the Helsinki Philharmonic Orchestra in 1904–1905 and in opera performances conducted by Armas Järnefelt.

He founded the Finnish Music Review (Fisk Musikrevy) in 1904 and worked as a music critic for the Dagens Tidning from 1912 to 1914 and for the Dagens Press from 1915 to 1920.

== Prizes and awards ==
- Composer's state pension d'État de compositeur (1921)
- Tollanderin palkinto (Tollander Prize) (1917)
- Pro Finlandia medal (1956)

== Works ==
=== Compositions and arrangements ===
- Klockringning sekakuorolle ja pianolle, 1903
- Pianokvintetto c-molli, 1906
- Romanttinen alkusoitto, 1911
- Sinfonia nro 1 D-duuri, 1911
- Viisi kuvaa orkesterille (alkuaan Exotica), 1925
- Sinfonia nro 2 es-molli, 1927
- Jousikvartetto, 1956
- Kansansävelmien sovituksia

=== Books ===
- (sv) Jean Sibelius: Hans tondiktning och drag ur hans liv (tr. "Jean Sibelius: His music and aspects of his life"), Schildt, 1916
- (fi) Jean Sibelius: Hänen sävelrunoutensa ja piirteitä hänen elämästään. ("Jean Sibelius: His music and aspects of his life.") (tr. Leevi Madetoja), WSOY, 1916
