= Ulla-Lena Lundberg =

Finland-Swedish author (born 1947)

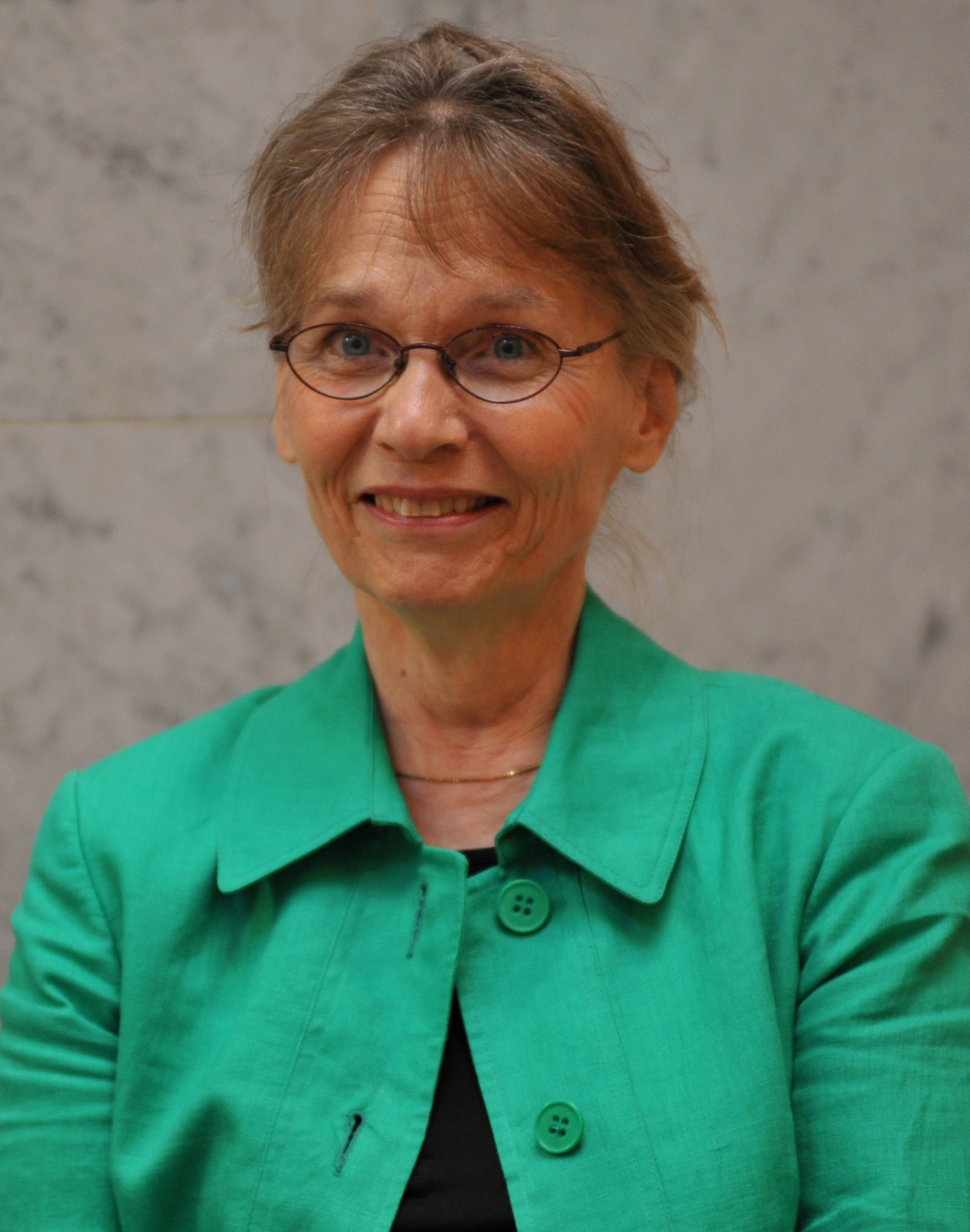
- Born: 14 July 1947 (age 79); Kökar, Åland, Finland
- Education: Pargas svenska samskola
- Alma mater: Åbo Akademi University
- Occupation: Author

Ulla-Lena Lundberg (born 14 July 1947) is a Finland-Swedish author living in Porvoo, Finland. Her Swedish-language books have been translated into several languages, including Finnish, Danish, German, Russian and Dutch.

== Biography ==
Lundberg was born in Kökar, Åland, Finland. Her father, Pehr Lundberg, was a vicar, and her mother, Maj Olin, was a primary school teacher. Lundberg made her debut at age 15 with the poetry anthology Utgångspunkt in 1962. In 1964, she spent some time in the United States on a scholarship. She subsequently wrote of her experiences in the US. Lundberg also wrote a book about Japan after living there in 1968, and lived in England from 1971 to 1973.

Her breakthrough is generally considered to be the 1976 book Kökar, a factual account of the past and present of her island of birth, told through the stories of some of the islanders. She would later write two novels about the fictional Kökar native Anna in Kungens Anna and Ingens Anna.
She would write extensively about Africa (the fictional Tre afrikanska berättelser, Sand and Regn and the factual Öar i Afrikas inre), having lived for two years in the African nations of Botswana, Zambia, Kenya and Tanzania.

After obtaining her master's degree in 1985 from Åbo Akademi University, Lundberg spent the academic year of 1986–1987 as a lecturer and writer in residence at the University of Minnesota. Save for this one year at the University of Minnesota, Lundberg has worked her entire professional life as an author and continues to do so.

In 1993, Lundberg published Sibirien, which, in addition to being an autobiography, is an account of four-month-long stays in Siberia. This has been the most internationally successful of her books.

Among her other works, the most notable include the acclaimed seafaring trilogy of Leo, Stora världen and Allt man kan önska sig, a series of fact-based, fictional novels detailing the history and evolution of shipping in Åland/Finland.

She has received numerous awards for her writing, the State Prize for Literature in 1971 and 1982, the Society of Swedish Literature in Finland's prize in 1967, 1969, 1971, 1977, and 1978, the Längman Prize in 1972, Runebergspriset and the prize for Finnish authors awarded by the Swedish Academy. In 1993, Lundberg was awarded an honorary doctorate of arts by Åbo Akademi University. Between 1994 and 1999, Lundberg held the title Professor of Arts. She has been nominated three times for Finland's top literary award the Finlandia Prize, and in 2012 she won the prize with the Swedish-language novel Is.

Lundberg is featured on a stamp issued on 21 March 2009 by Åland Post, the postal authority of Åland. The stamp, by the artist Juha Pykäläinen, is a portrait of Lundberg next to a depiction of the ship Leo, from the first book of her trilogy about Åland shipping. The stamp is part of a stamp booklet called Åland Authors, and also includes a stamp featuring Anni Blomqvist and a stamp featuring Valdemar Nyman.

Lundberg's novel Ice was awarded the Finlandia Prize, Finland's most prestigious literary award, in 2012. With domestic sales of almost 150,000 copies, it has become one of the most cherished Finnish novels of the decade. Partly based on the life on Lundberg's own family on the isolated island of Kökar, Ice has attracted much interest from theatres, but the Finnish National Opera was the first to get permission to adapt it for the stage. The libretto follows the key events and characters of the rich novel, with music that rings with the changing seasons and the ever-present threat of ice.

== Bibliography ==
=== As author ===
- Utgångspunkt (1962) (poetry)
- Strövtåg (1966) (travel)
- Noll (1966) (radio play)
- O du bygdemålare med rosiga kinder (1967) (radio play)
- En berättelse om gränser (1968) (travel)
- Gaijin-utlänning i Japan (1970) (travel)
- Konstnärens födelsedag (1970) (radio play)
- Harald Grönberg 1941 (1974) (radio play)
- När barometern stod på Karl Öberg och andra hörspel (1974) (radio theater)
- Kökar (1976) (factual)
- Tre afrikanska berättelser (1977) (novella anthology)
- Öar i Afrikas inre (1981) (anthropology, with photographs by the author)
- Kungens Anna (1982) (novel)
- Ingens Anna (1984) (novel)
- Franciskus i Kökar (1985) (master's thesis)
- Sand (1986) (novel)
- Leo (1989) (novel)
- Stora världen (1991) (novel)
- Sibirien (1993) (travel)
- Allt kan man önska sig (1995) (novel)
- Regn (1997) (novel)
- Marsipansoldaten (2001) (novel)
- Människan och målaren (2005) (biography of Åke Hellman, co-authored by Erik Kruskopf)
- Hundra År i Gammelgård (2006) (history of a Gammelgård's social club in Espoo, co-authored by Lasse Hoffman and Unni Malmgren)
- Is (2012) (novel)

=== As editor ===
- Vackre Alen. Memoarer av Algot Lundberg. (1981) (autobiography of Algot Lundberg)
- Männen som kom från havet. Jakthistorier från Kökar (2000)
