= Runeberg Prize =

Finnish literature prize

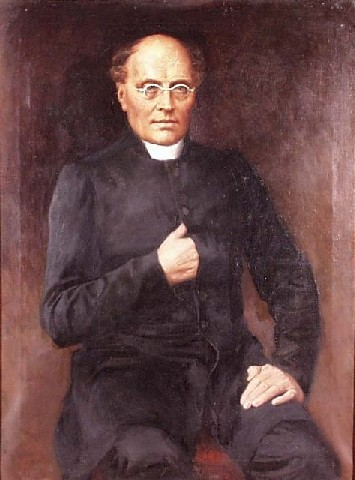
Portrait of Johan Ludvig Runeberg, painted 1893 by Albert Edelfelt

The Runeberg Prize (Finnish: Runeberg-palkinto, Swedish: Runebergspriset) is a Finnish literature prize founded in 1987 (39 years ago).

The prize is named in honour of Finnish national poet Johan Ludvig Runeberg (1804–1877) and is awarded annually on his birthday, 5 February. The prize is awarded to a literary work by a Finnish writer in Finnish or Swedish. The Runeberg prize is currently endowed with 20,000 euros.

The award is administered by the city of Porvoo, the longtime centre of Runeberg's life, along with the Finnish-language Union of Finnish Writers (Suomen Kirjailijaliitto), the Finland-Swedish Society of Swedish Authors in Finland (Finlands svenska författareförening), The Finnish Critics' Association (Suomen arvostelijain liitto/Finlands kritikerförbund) and the newspaper Uusimaa.

== Runeberg Prize winners ==
Year	Author	Title	Language
1987	Kari Aronpuro	Kirjaimet tulevat	Finnish
1988	Sinikka Tirkkonen	Luvaton elämä	Finnish
1989	Timo Pusa	Tatuoitu sydän	Finnish
1990	Eeva Kilpi	Talvisodan aika	Finnish
1991	Aulikki Oksanen	Henkivartija	Finnish
1992	Lars Sund	Colorado Avenue	Swedish
1993	Raija Siekkinen	Metallin maku	Finnish
1994	Paavo Rintala	Aika ja uni	Finnish
1995	Monika Fagerholm	Underbara kvinnor vid vatten	Swedish
1996	Agneta Ara	Huset med de glömda dörrarna	Swedish
1997	Hannu Aho	Kello 4.17	Finnish
1998	Ulla-Lena Lundberg	Regn	Swedish
1999	Mari Mörö	Kiltin yön lahjat	Finnish
2000	Tuula-Liina Varis	Maan päällä paikka yksi on	Finnish
2001	Juha Seppälä	Suuret kertomukset	Finnish
2002	Risto Ahti	Vain tahallaan voi rakastaa	Finnish
2003	Ranya ElRamly	Auringon asema	Finnish
2004	Rakel Liehu	Helene	Finnish
2005	Zinaida Lindén	I väntan på en jordbävning	Swedish
2006	Riitta Jalonen	Kuvittele itsellesi mies	Finnish
2007	Sanna Ravi	Ansari	Finnish
2008	Hannele Mikaela Taivassalo	Fem knivar hade Andrej Krapl	Swedish
2009	Sofi Oksanen	Puhdistus	Finnish
2010	Kari Hotakainen	Ihmisen osa	Finnish
2011	Tiina Raevaara	En tunne sinua vierelläni	Finnish
2012	Katja Kettu	Kätilö	Finnish
2013	Olli-Pekka Tennilä	Yksinkeltainen on kaksinkeltaista	Finnish
2014	Hannu Raittila	Terminaali	Finnish
2015	Joni Skiftesvik	Valkoinen Toyota vei vaimoni	Finnish
2016	Tapio Koivukari	Unissasaarnaaja	Finnish
2017	Peter Sandström	Laudatur	Swedish
2018	Marjo Niemi	Kaikkien menetysten äiti	Finnish
2019	Heikki Kännö	Sömnö	Finnish
2020	Ralf Andtbacka	Potsdamer Platz	Swedish
2021	Marisha Rasi-Koskinen	Rec	Finnish
2022	Quynh Tran	Skugga och svalka	Swedish
2023	Marja Kyllönen	Vainajaiset	Finnish
2024	Peter Mickwitz	Misslyckad i en uggla	Swedish
2025	Pirkko Saisio	Suliko	Finnish
