= Kunnas =

Kunnas is a surname of Finnish/Estonian origin and may refer to:

- Hanna-Helena Kunnas (1880–?), Finnish writer and translator
- Kaj Kunnas (born 1963), Finnish sportswriter
- Kirsi Kunnas (1924–2021), Finnish author and translator.
- Leo Kunnas (born 1967), Estonian writer and military officer
- Mauri Kunnas (born 1950), Finnish cartoonist and writer
- Sylvi Kunnas (1903–1971), Finnish painting artist
- Väinö Kunnas (1896–1929), Finnish painting artist
