= Tuula-Liina Varis =

Finnish writer

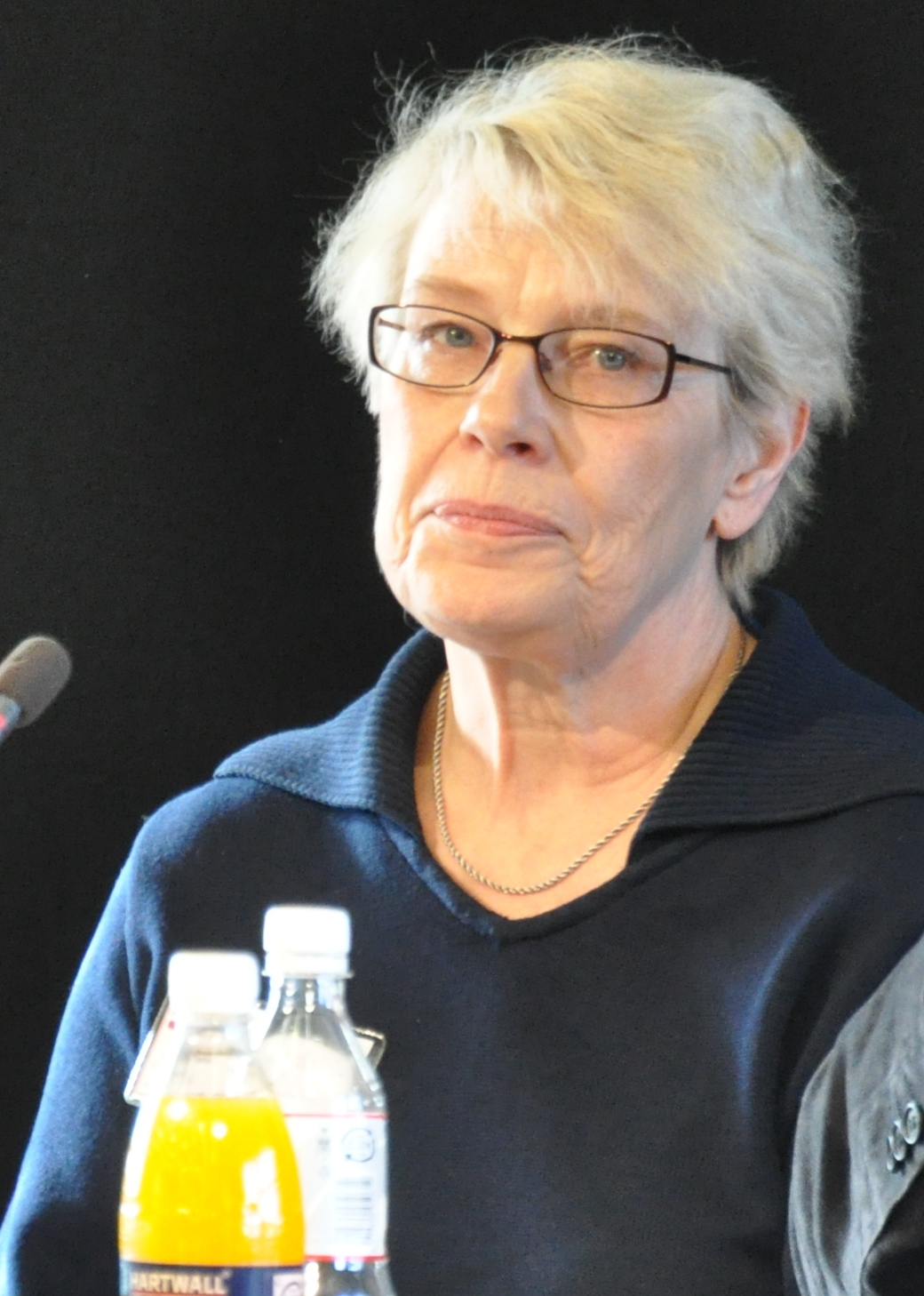

Tuula-Liina Varis (born 30 June 1942 in Loimaa) is a Finnish writer and journalist. Between 2009 and 2014, she served as the first female president of the Union of Finnish Writers. She was awarded a Runeberg Prize in 2000.
