= Korkeakoski railway station =

Railway station in Juupajoki, Finland

Korkeakoski
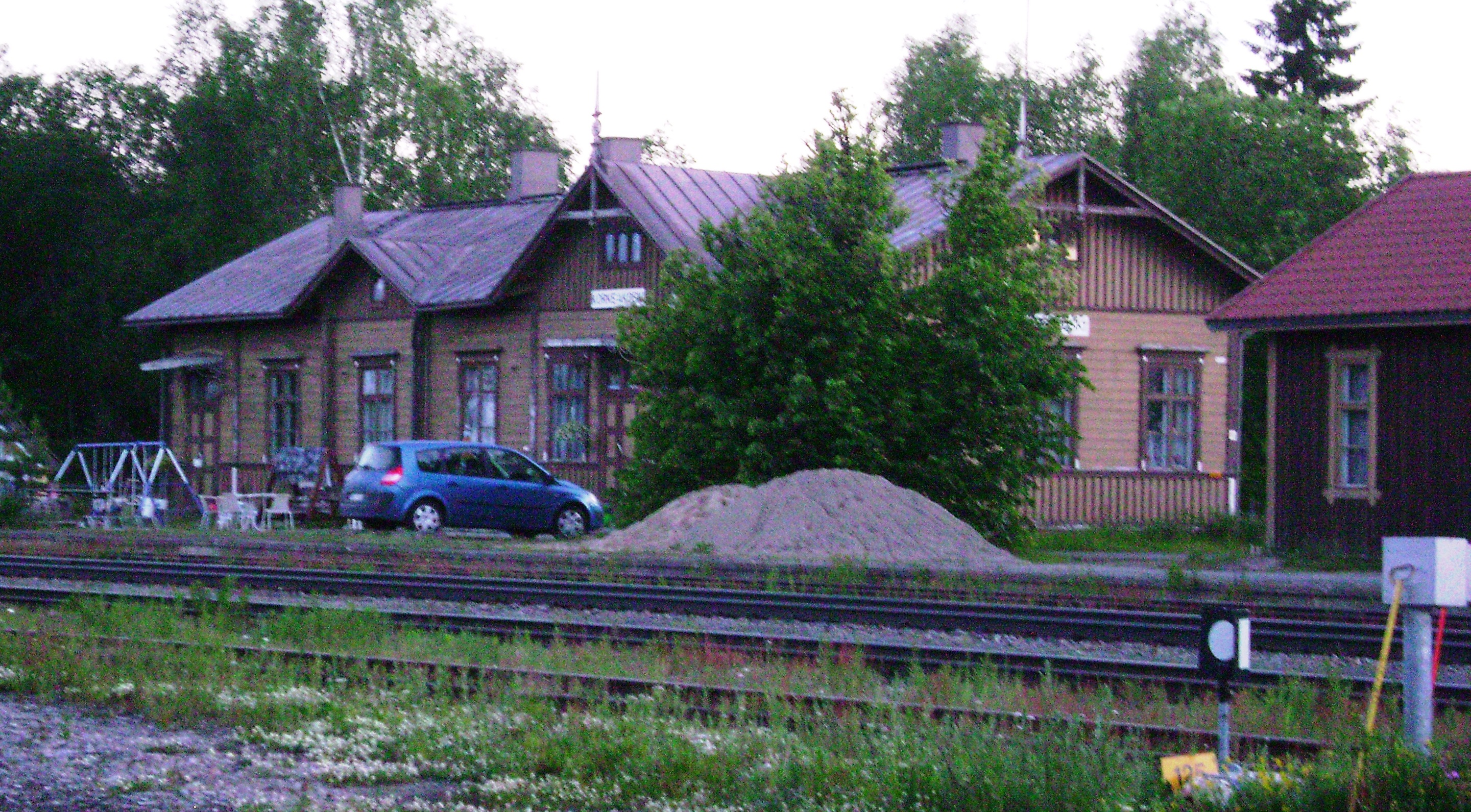

General information
- Location: Koskitie, 35500; Korkeakoski, Juupajoki; Finland
- Coordinates: 61°48.464′N 024°22.537′E
- System: VR freight station
- Owner: Finnish Transport Infrastructure Agency
- Operator: VR Group
- Line: Tampere–Haapamäki

Other information
- Station code: Kas
- Classification: Operating point

History
- Opened: 29 September 1883
- Closed: 27 May 1990 (passenger services)
Location

The Korkeakoski railway station (Finnish: Korkeakosken rautatieasema, Swedish: Korkeakoski järnvägsstation) is a railway station located in the municipality of Juupajoki, Finland, in the municipal seat and urban area of Korkeakoski. It is located along the Tampere–Haapamäki railway. Korkeakoski has only served freight transport since 1990; in 1998, the Juupajoki halt, located approximately 1.35 kilometres (0.84 mi) to the south from Korkeakoski, was opened to serve passenger transport in the area.

The Finnish Heritage Agency has proclaimed the Korkeakoski industrial community, of which the railway station is part of, as a built cultural environment of national significance.

== History ==
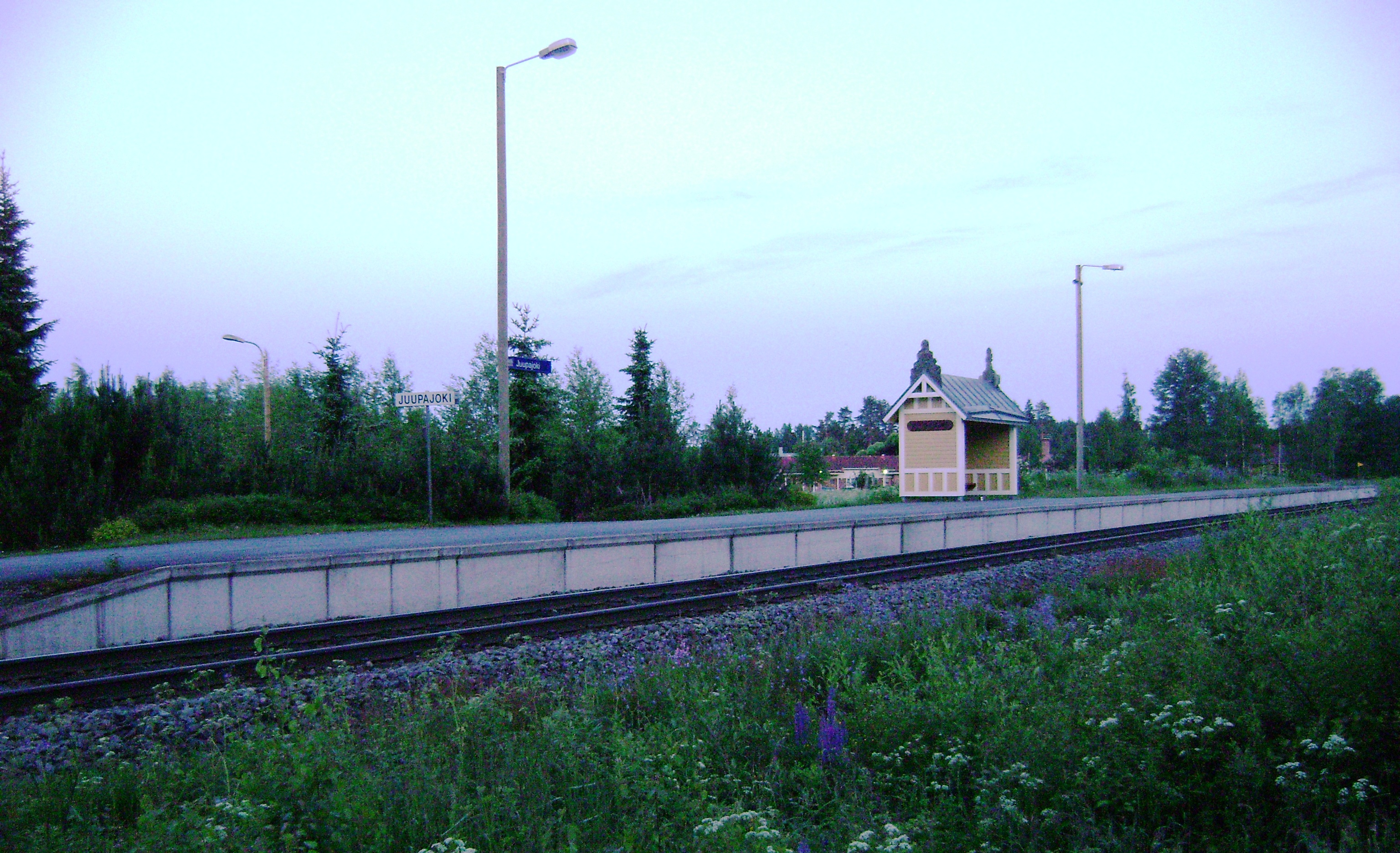
Juupajoki halt in 2013

Korkeakoski, being one of the original stations of the Tampere–Haapamäki railway, was opened on 29 September 1883. Its location was based on its proximity to the Korkeakoski mill; the railway also crossed with the road between the Juupajoki church and Ruovesi. In the next decade, Korkeakoski's growth into an industrial locality began to take off with Edward Wallenius investing in the establishment of several factories: first a sawmill and a mechanized leather factory in 1894, followed by a shoe factory in 1898. His decision to found the facilities in Korkeakoski stemmed not only from the presence of the railway, but also that of the Korkeakoski rapids, providing potential for the use of hydropower. Originally a part of Orivesi, Korkeakoski became part of the newly independent municipality of Juupajoki in 1913.

Passenger services in Korkeakoski were abolished in 1990; 8 years later, a new halt was constructed closer to the center of the municipality, and was named Juupajoki after it. The halt was opened for traffic on 31 May 1998. Korkeakoski became an unstaffed station in 2004.

== Services ==
The Juupajoki halt is served by all regional trains on the routes Tampere–Haapamäki–Jyväskylä; the default type of rolling stock for the route is the Dm12 railbus. The station does not have a VR ticket vending machine nor other ticketing services, though it has an accessible 55 centimetres (22 in) high platform.

== Architecture ==
The station building in Korkeakoski was constructed according to the stock blueprints for the smaller pysäkki stations on the Tampere–Haapamäki railway, and was completed in 1883. In 1901, it almost doubled in size after the completion of an extension designed by Bruno Granholm.

== See also ==
- Lyly railway station
