= Lyly railway station =

Railway station in Juupajoki, Finland

Lyly
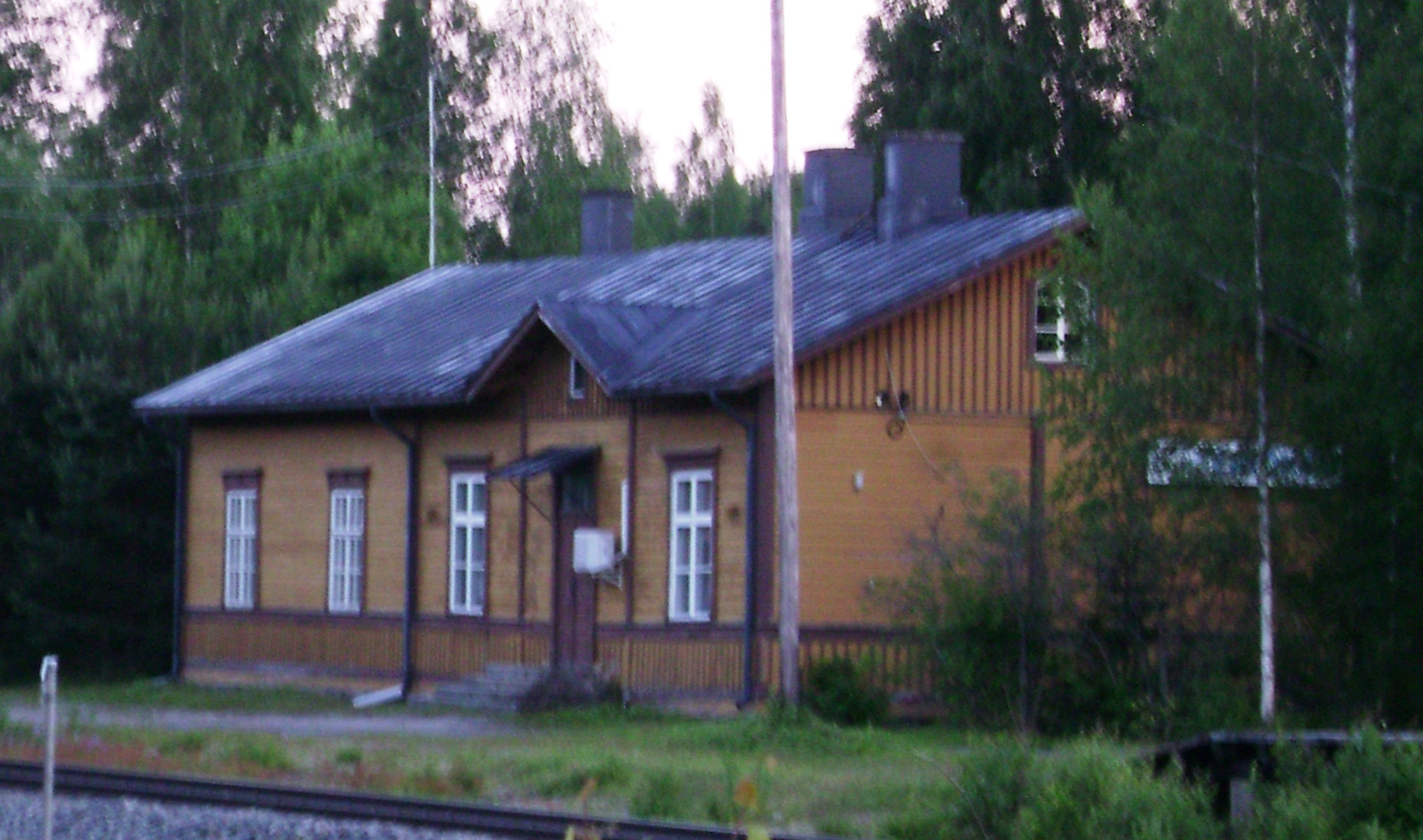

General information
- Location: Lyly, Juupajoki; Finland
- Coordinates: 61°53.138′N 024°28.733′E
- System: Closed VR station
- Owner: Finnish Transport Infrastructure Agency
- Operator: VR Group
- Line: Tampere–Haapamäki

Other information
- Station code: Ly

History
- Opened: 29 September 1883
- Closed: 27 May 1990
Location

The Lyly railway station (Finnish: Lylyn rautatieasema, Swedish: Lyly järnvägsstation) is a closed station located in the municipality of Juupajoki, Finland, in the village of Lyly. It was located along the Tampere–Haapamäki railway, and its nearest open stations are Korkeakoski and Juupajoki in the south and Vilppula in the north.

The Finnish Heritage Agency has proclaimed the Lyly station as a built cultural environment of national significance.

== History ==
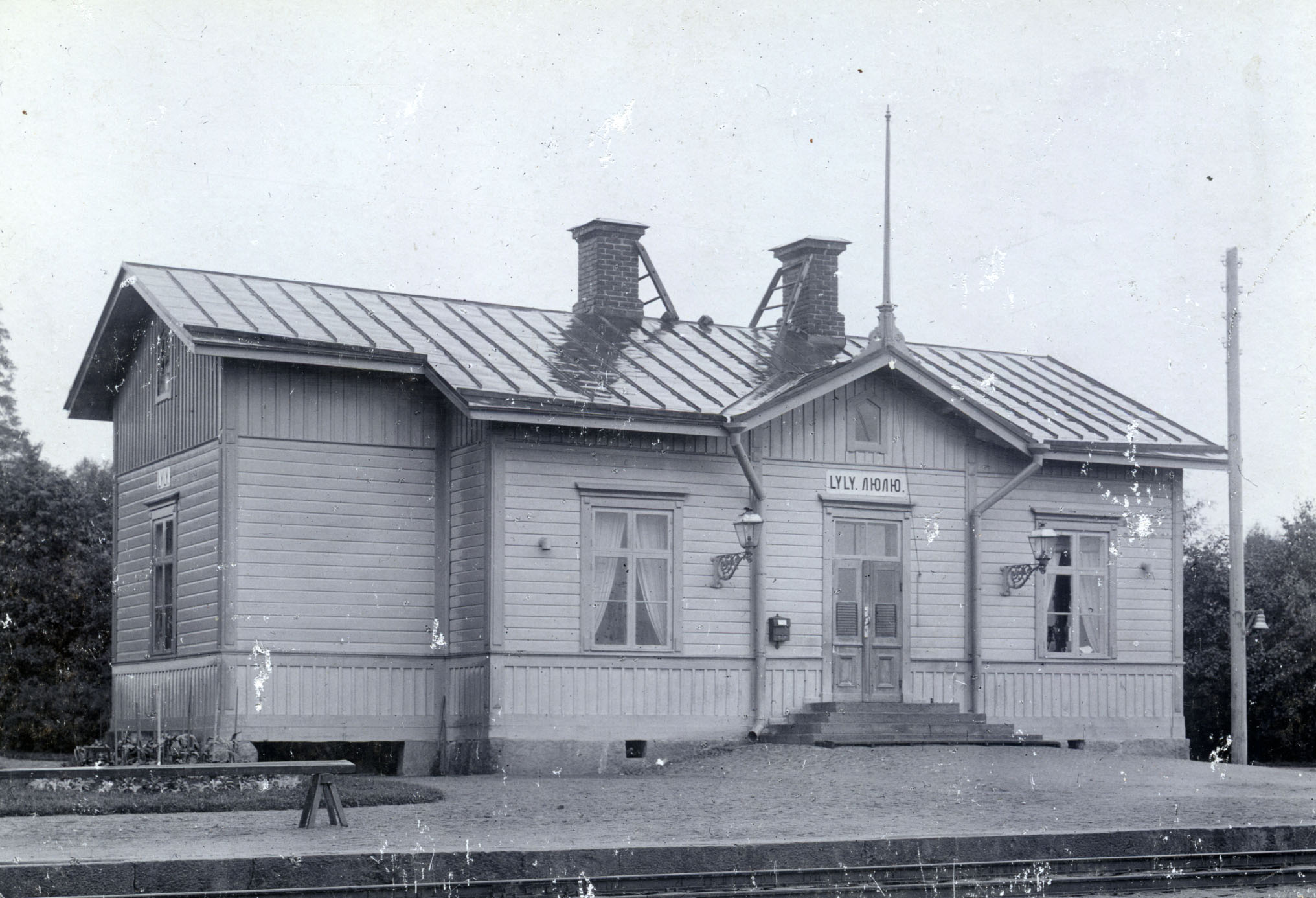
Lyly in 1910-1911

Lyly was opened as a pysäkki (a station of lower importance, translating to "stop") with the rest of the Tampere–Haapamäki railway on 29 September 1883. It was placed on the western shore of lake Ala-Lylyjärvi; the railway cuts through the isthmus between it and lake Ylä-Lylyjärvi to the south. The station came to be used mostly for transport of wood; it was surrounded by forest, and the Sahakoski sawmill and paper factory were located 6 kilometres (3.7 mi) away. The pysäkki was promoted to a full station in 1888. Originally a part of Orivesi, Lyly became part of the newly independent municipality of Juupajoki in 1913.

In fall 1940, the Finnish Defense Forces moved its workshop from neighboring Korkeakoski to Lyly; it was located approximately 2 kilometres (1.2 mi) away from the station. By the 1960s, a scattered village of about 400 inhabitants had former around the Lyly station, though its population had declined under the threshold of being counted as an urban area of 200 by the end of the 1990s. Lyly became an unstaffed station in 1978, and trains stopped calling there on 27 May 1990.

The possibility of reopening the Lyly station for use by the regional trains on the Tampere–Haapamäki line was explored in 2006. However, the Orivesi Central and Kolho halts received priority due to their surroundings housing much more potential users than Lyly did. Additionally, the inclusion of a third additional stop in Lyly would have made the arranging of train exchanges in Tampere difficult.

== Architecture ==
The station building in Lyly was constructed according to the stock blueprints for the smaller pysäkki stations on the Tampere–Vaasa railway. It was completed in 1883, and was expanded in 1920. Most of the buildings on its premises were built in the years 1883 and 1910. In 1903, the premises were expanded with a wooden water tower and a platform used for refueling the tenders of steam locomotives. The water tower was replaced by a new one in 1951, this time constructed out of brick; the old one was demolished in 1952, though the new one still remains.

== See also ==
- Korkeakoski railway station
