= Aulikki =

Aulikki is a Finnish female given name. Notable people with the name include:

- Aulikki Oksanen (born 1944), Finnish writer
- Aulikki Rautawaara (1906–1990), Finnish soprano
- Aulikki Ristoja (born 1949), Finnish chess player
