= Eirik Hornborg =

Finnish historian, educator, writer and politician (1879–1965)

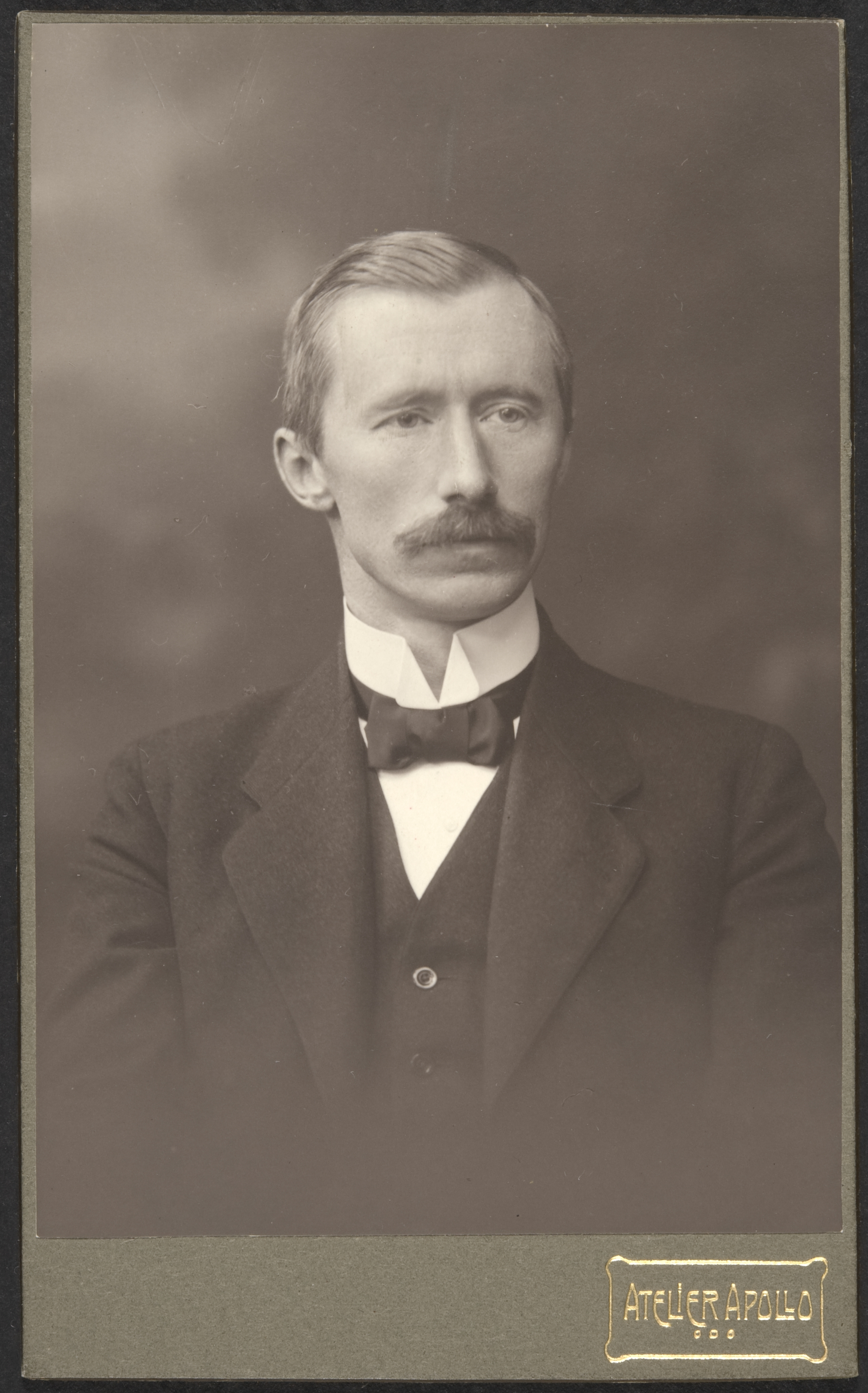
- Eirik Hornborg
- Born: Eirik Mikael Hornborg; September 29, 1879; Helsinki, Grand Duchy of Finland
- Died: December 29, 1965 (aged 86); Helsinki, Finland
- Other names: Edward M. Henderson
- Education: University of Helsinki (BA, 1901)
- Occupations: Historian, educator, writer, politician
- Political party: Swedish People's Party of Finland
- Spouse: Ingeborg Ilmoni (m. 1918)
- Parent(s): Albrecht Hornborg, Alma Hornborg
- Relatives: Torsten Hornborg, Harald Hornborg

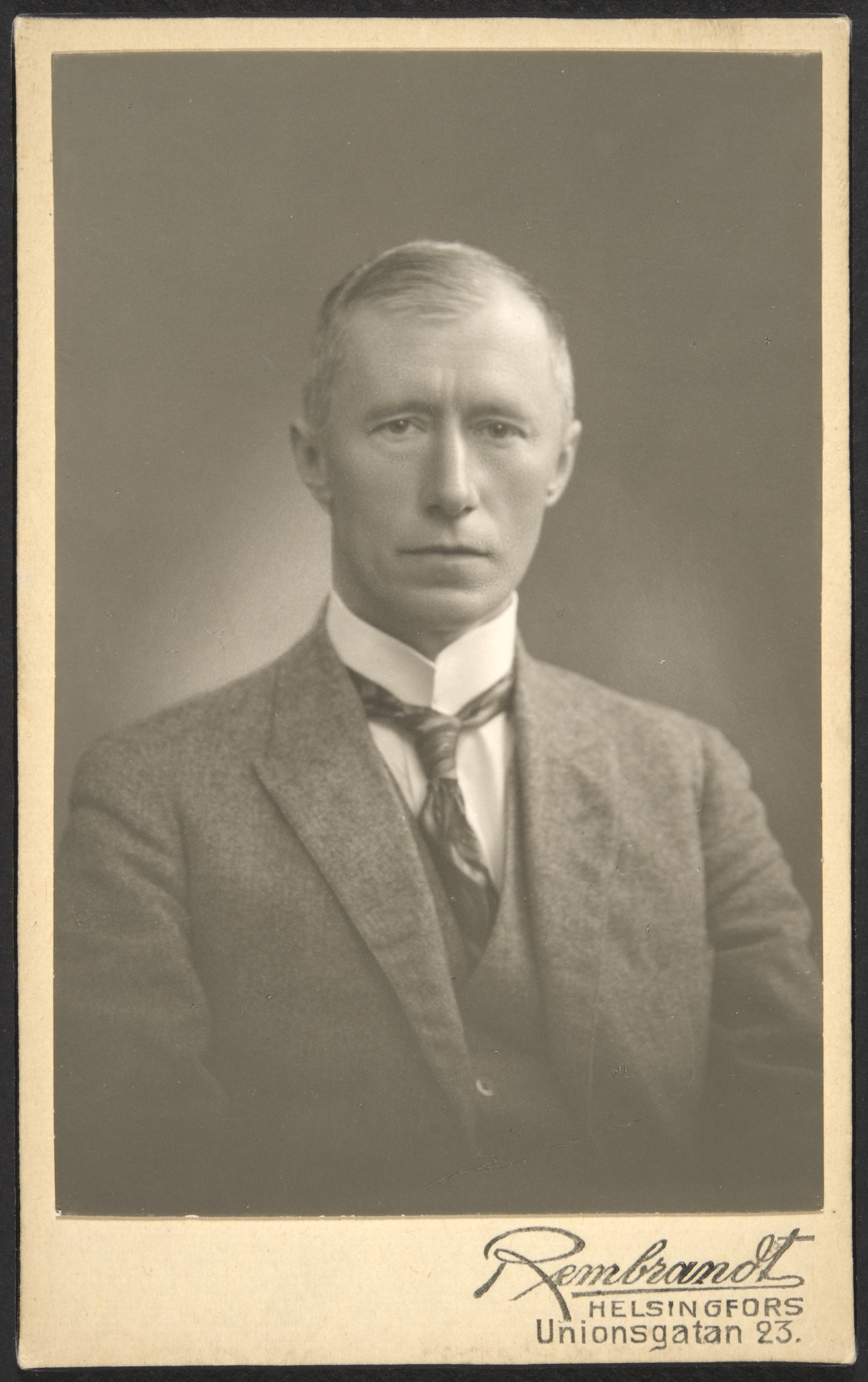
Eirik Hornborg (1920s)

Eirik Mikael Hornborg (29 September 1879 – 29 December 1965) was a Finland-Swedish historian, educator, writer, and politician, born in Helsinki. He served as a member of the Parliament of Finland representing the Swedish People's Party of Finland (SPP) in three periods between 1916 and 1927.

As a historian he produced extensive synthetic works on Finnish, Scandinavian, and world history, and was awarded honorary doctorates by the University of Stockholm in 1936 and the University of Helsinki in 1950. He was chairman of the Society of Swedish Literature in Finland from 1934 to 1947. During World War I he served with the 27th Jäger Battalion in Germany, and during the Finnish Civil War he organised the clandestine White movement in Helsinki.

== Biography ==
Hornborg was born into a prominent Finland-Swedish cultural family. His parents were Albrecht Hornborg and Alma Hornborg, and he was older brother to the authors Harald and Torsten Hornborg. He studied at the University of Helsinki, graduating with a Bachelor of Arts in 1901, and worked as a teacher of history and Swedish at private schools in Helsinki from 1900 to 1944. He served as headmaster of the Nya svenska flickskolan from 1907 to 1915 and of the Lönnbeckska samskolan from 1914 to 1918, a school he had himself attended as its first enrolled pupil in 1897.

=== Political career ===
Hornborg was a prominent member of the secret network known as the Jäger movement during World War I, which sought Finnish independence with the support of the German Empire. In 1916, he traveled clandestinely to Germany and joined the 27th Jäger Battalion on 11 July 1916, shortly after being elected as a Member of Parliament in the 1916 Finnish parliamentary election. In the autumn of 1916, he participated in battles against the Imperial Russian Army on the Courland front. After the February Revolution of 1917, he returned to Finland to resume his parliamentary duties.

During the Finnish Civil War in January 1918, Hornborg went into hiding in Helsinki, controlled by the Red side, and became a key organizer of the clandestine White movement in the city. During the Continuation War of 1941–1944, he was part of the Peace opposition that sought a separate peace with the Allies, achieved in September 1944.

In his political outlook he was broadly conservative, and in several matters diverged from the SPP's general line in favour of cross-party bourgeois cooperation and a more moderate language policy.

As chairman of the parliamentary defence commission in the early 1920s, he publicly exposed deficiencies in the army in order to secure additional resources for the military. He was prosecuted for revealing defence secrets but was acquitted by the court of appeal.

Hornborg vigorously opposed the Lapua movement, warning against its totalitarian tendencies and arguing that communism did not at that time pose an acute threat justifying extraordinary measures.

In 1945, Hornborg chaired the so-called Hornborg Committee, appointed after the Continuation War to examine how Finland had become involved in the conflict. The committee's findings are often characterised as an outright condemnation of Finland's orientation towards Germany, but this view is an oversimplification; on several points the committee took an understanding view of the policies of previous governments. The final formulation was influenced by Prime Minister J. K. Paasikivi, who was mindful of Soviet reactions. In the uncertain political climate after the war, Hornborg became an important confidant of Paasikivi, and drafted a reply on Paasikivi's behalf to a letter from Joseph Stalin.

In 1961, Hornborg was among the most vocal opponents of the Agrarian League's campaign to elect Urho Kekkonen as president on the grounds that this would best preserve peace on Finland's borders. Hornborg regarded the argument as unpatriotic intimidation and factional politics.

=== Historical writing ===
As a writer and commentator over seven decades, Hornborg was extraordinarily prolific. He described his own interest in history as "aesthetic-romantic" rather than purely scholarly, which may explain why he never completed the doctoral dissertation he had planned in his mid-twenties. Over time his work acquired an increasingly rigorous scholarly character, and his large-scale synthetic histories of Finland, Scandinavia, and the world were appreciated by academics as well as general readers.

Hornborg was particularly fascinated by naval and military history. He sailed himself and wrote an account of a voyage to the Antipodes Islands southeast of New Zealand. His maritime interests led to his being made an honorary member of the Finnish Masters and Mates Association.

Alongside his historical works, Hornborg wrote fiction including adventure novels for younger readers, published under the pseudonym Edward M. Henderson.

He served as a member of the editorial board of Nya Argus from 1927 to 1948 and chaired the Society of Swedish Literature in Finland from 1934 to 1947, resigning the latter post after the society awarded the Ida Rosqvist prize to the modernist poet Gunnar Björling, whose work Hornborg considered not to be written in any recognisable language. He was chairman of the Society of Swedish Authors in Finland in 1922–1924 and 1932.

He was awarded honorary doctorates from the University of Stockholm in 1936 and the University of Helsinki in 1950. He received several awards, including the Lybeckska prize in 1921 and 1930, the Tollanderska prize in 1951, and the Kungliga prize in 1951.

== Publications ==
- Den döende staden (1908)
- Finska kriget 1808-1809 (1909)
- Fortuna (1910)
- Svallvågen (1911)
- Hvarför? och Huru? (1914)
- Rysslands frammarsch (1914)
- Svensk nationalitet i Finland (1914)
- Finlands öde och Sveriges trygghet (1915)
- Under segel till antipoderna (1915)
- Tristan da Cunha (1916)
- Brytningstid (1918)
- Den ensamma vargen (1918)
- Finlands svenskar vid skiljovägen (1919)
- Gudarna (1919)
- Hernando Cortes (1919)
- Isaac Scotts minnen (1920)
- Hernando Cortes och erövringen av Mexico (1921)
- Kriget framställt i skildringar från nyare tid (1921)
- Martin Elfdahl (1921)
- Segelsjöfartens historia (1923)
- Historik över sjö- och stapelstaden Borgås utrikes sjöfart (1925)
- Sjörövare (1927)
- Borgungarna: 1 (1929)
- Finlands hävder (1929–1933)
- Borgungarna: 2 (1931)
- Konung Gustaf II Adolf (1932)
- Gyllene Hoppet (1933)
- Universitetet och språkstriden (1933)
- Borgungarna: 3 (1934)
- Finlands historia (1934)
- Indianer (1936)
- Från forntid till nutid (1938)
- På vallen (1939)
- Sveriges historia (1940)
- Roms tredje storhetstid (1941)
- Gränsfästet Viborg. Från korstågstiden till våra dagar (1942)
- Den vite mannens börda (1943)
- Sveriges sjöförsvar från äldsta tider till våra dagar (1944)
- Kampen om Östersjön (1945)
- Stefan Löfving (1946)
- Helsingfors stads historia (1950)
- Karolinen Armfelt och kampen om Finland under Stora nordiska kriget (1952)
- Hårda bud (1953)
- Fänrik Ståls sägner och verkligheten (1954)
- Länder och hav (1954)
- När riket sprängdes (1955)
- Klanernas Skottland (1956)
- Det fria Finland (1957)
- Man i ledet (1959)
- Stormig höst (1960)
- Tider och öden (1961)
