= Katja Kettu =

Finnish writer and animation director

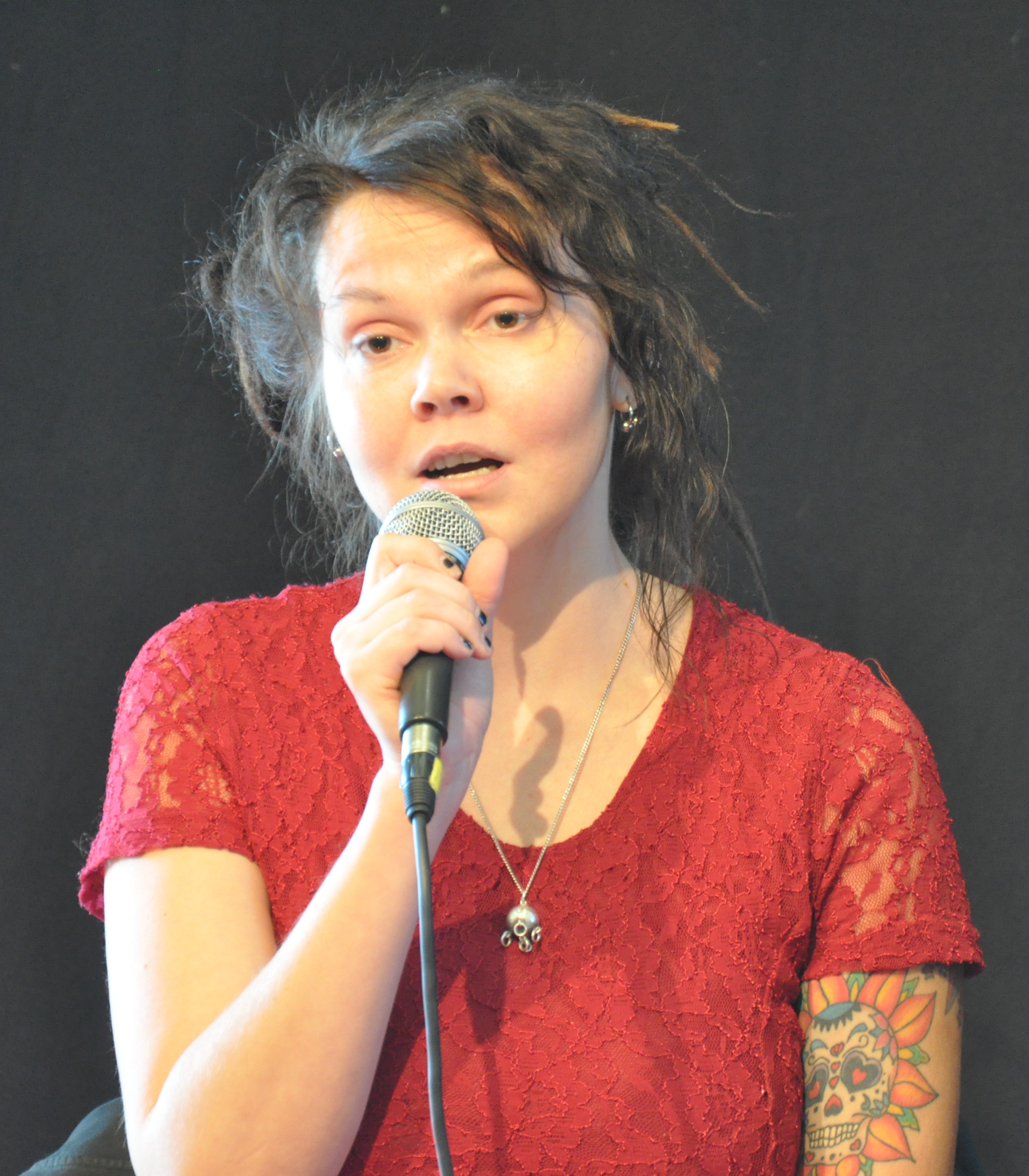
- Born: Katja Maaria Heikkinen; April 10, 1978 (age 48); Muhos, Finland
- Occupation: Writer
- Writing career
- Notable work: The Midwife

Katja Maaria Kettu (born Heikkinen, April 10, 1978) is a Finnish contemporary writer and film producer. She debuted in 2005 with the novel Surujenkerääjä. The book was nominated for the Helsingin-Sanomat literature prize as best debut novel. Her breakthrough as writer succeeded with The Midwife (Kätilö). In the book Kettu describes the love between a Finnish midwife and a German officer during the Second World War. She shows in brutal scenes of birth, abortion and murder how people are able to suffer for love. The story is inspired by the life of Kettu's grandparents.

Awards
Preceded by Tiina Raevaara	Winner of the Runeberg Prize; 2012	Succeeded by Olli-Pekka Tennilä
