= Harald Hornborg =

Swedo-Finnish writer (1890–1976)

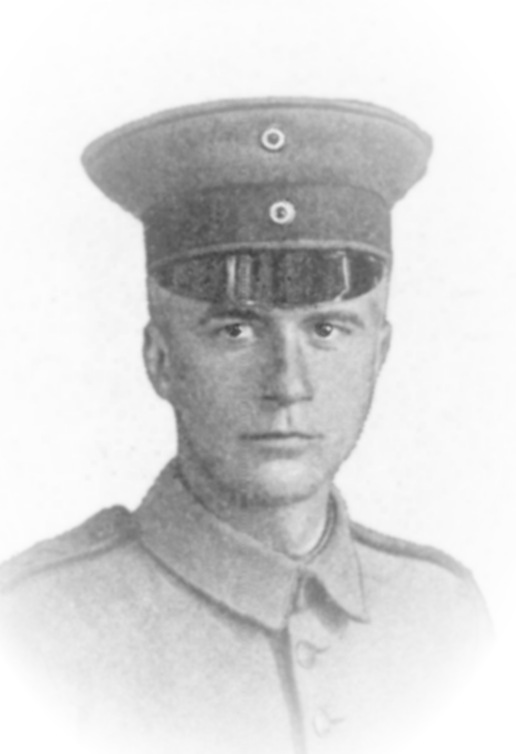
Harald Hornborg

Birger Harald Hornborg (16 February 1890 – 10 July 1976) was a Finland Swedish writer. He was the son of the chamberlain Albrecht Hornborg (1846–1926) and his second wife Alma Maria (1853–1932), and the younger brother of Eirik and Torsten Hornborg.

== Biography ==
Born in Helsinki, Hornborg graduated from the Nya svenska samskolan in Helsinki in 1909 and began working at the Nyland Brigade. He continued his studies at the Department of History and Linguistics at the Faculty of Philosophy at the University of Helsinki from 1909 to 1915, where he later graduated with a Bachelor of Arts degree in 1925 and a Master of Arts degree in 1927.

Hornborg was among the first students to be recruited into the Jägar movement and in 1915 he became one of the first to undertake the pfadfinder-course in Germany. Hornborg was first assigned at the unit's second company. He later became part of the 27th Prussian Jäger Battalion's second company. On 12 July 1917 he was transferred to the battalion's reinforcement unit, from where he was transferred to the Finnish office in Berlin as a literary assistant. Hornborg had to remain in Berlin when the battalion departed for Finland due to his illness, and after recovering he was appointed chancellor of the Finnish embassy in Berlin in 1918, a position he held until 1920. Hornborg became a Jägerlieutenant in 1918 and a captain in 1940.

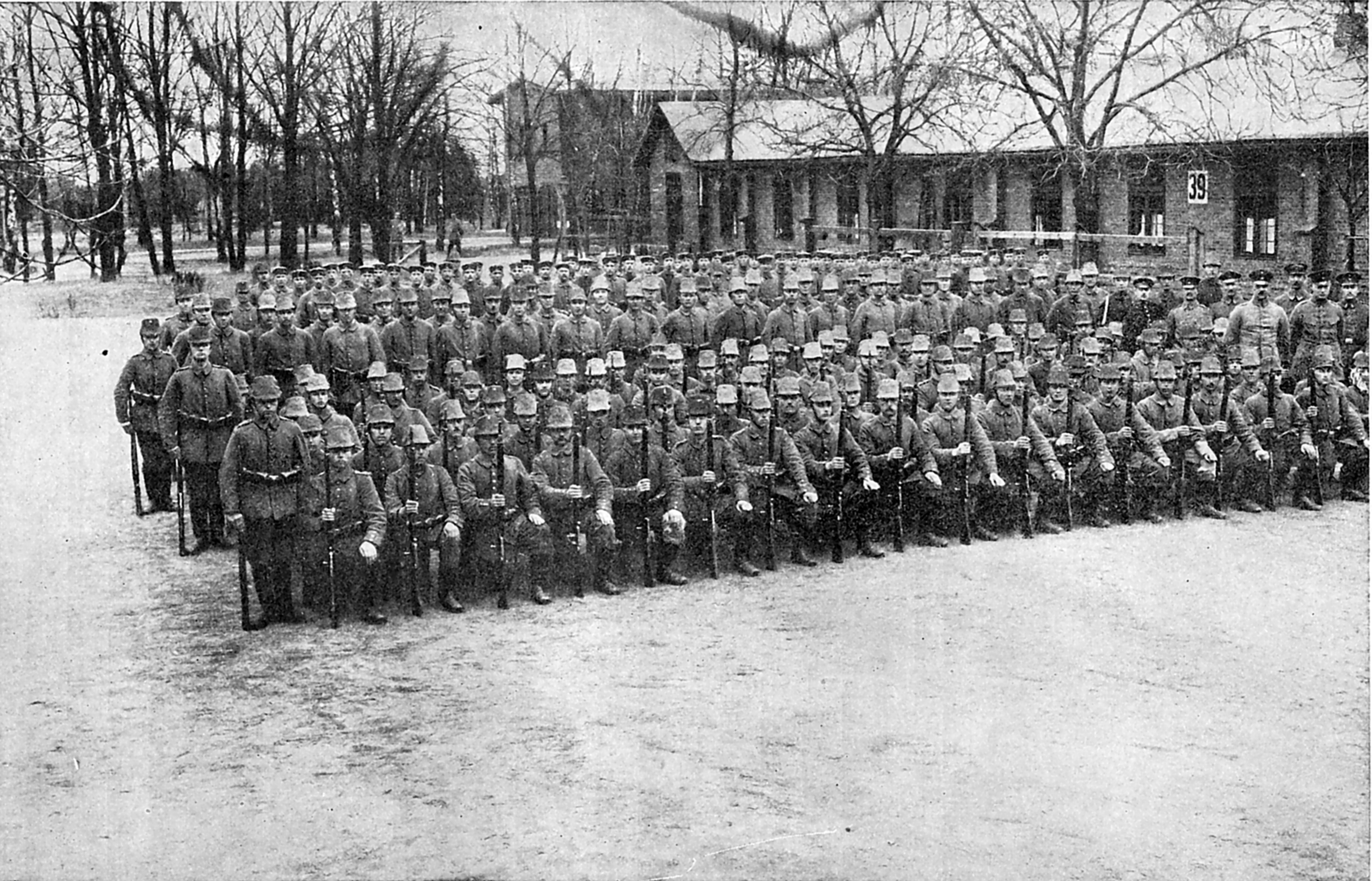
2nd Company of the Jägar Battalion

During the interwar years, he worked as an official at the Ministry of Foreign Affairs from 1920 to 1931, 1931–1934 as second director at Holger Schildts publishing house and 1935–1940 as an official at the Wood Processing Industry Employers' Association.

During the Winter War, Hornborg served at the headquarters of the Helsinki Military District, establishing, among other things, a communications station in the Helsinki railway station, the purpose of which was to maintain contact between the headquarters and the government. After this position, he served as adjutant to the commander of the military district. When the Continuation War broke out, he returned to work as adjutant to the commander of the Helsinki Military District, from which he was demobilized in 1942, after which he continued his work as a writer.

In 1948, Hornborg became a research member of the Swedish Genealogical Society.

Hornborg married Anna Irene Wiitanen in 1921, with whom he had two children and whom he divorced in 1937. He married a Aino Towast in 1937. Hornborg died in Karis at the age of 86 in 1976.

== Authorship ==
Hornborg wrote a series of humorous novels about the fictional German principalities of Flüstringen and Bühlingen. The first was published in 1928, under the title Herr von Loeweneck's battle. Hornborg also wrote several novels set in 18th and 19th century Finnish settings, such as the series of novels about Hakenskiölds. De fann sin väg (1965) is about the 27th Prussian Jaeger Battalion and is a piece of first-hand history. In his writing, he strove to faithfully reflect the spirit of the times by accurately portraying environments, behaviors, and ways of thinking.

== Bibliography (selection) ==
- Herr von Loewenecks kamp, 1928
- Martin Türkheimer och huset Sonnenburgs hemligheter, 1929
- Madame d'Ébére, 1930
- Patron Illbergs ungdomsdårskap, 1931
- Hakenskiölds på Sveaborg, 1932
- Hakenskiölds på Illerstad, 1933
- Greve Alexeis son, 1934
- Hertigen revolterar, 1935
- Bühlingen i uppror, 1936
- Farväl Flüstringen, 1937
- Ödemarksprästen, 1938
- Ödemarksjungfrun, 1939
- De glömda fäderna, 1940
- Den okände karolinen, 1942
- Det mörknar över Illerstad, 1943
- Syndafloden, 1944
- Bröderna Berghjelm, 1945
- Galne Berghjelmen, 1946
- Kammarjunkaren på Lintunen, 1947
- Den vita hästen, 1950
- Kattgrevinnan, 1951
- Joachim vid skijevägen, 1952
- Ensam herre, 1953
- Studenten som försvann, 1954
- Utanför arenan, 1959
- De fann sin väg : pfadfindernas historia, 1965
