= Society of Swedish Authors in Finland =

Society of Swedish Authors in Finland (Finlands svenska författareförening)
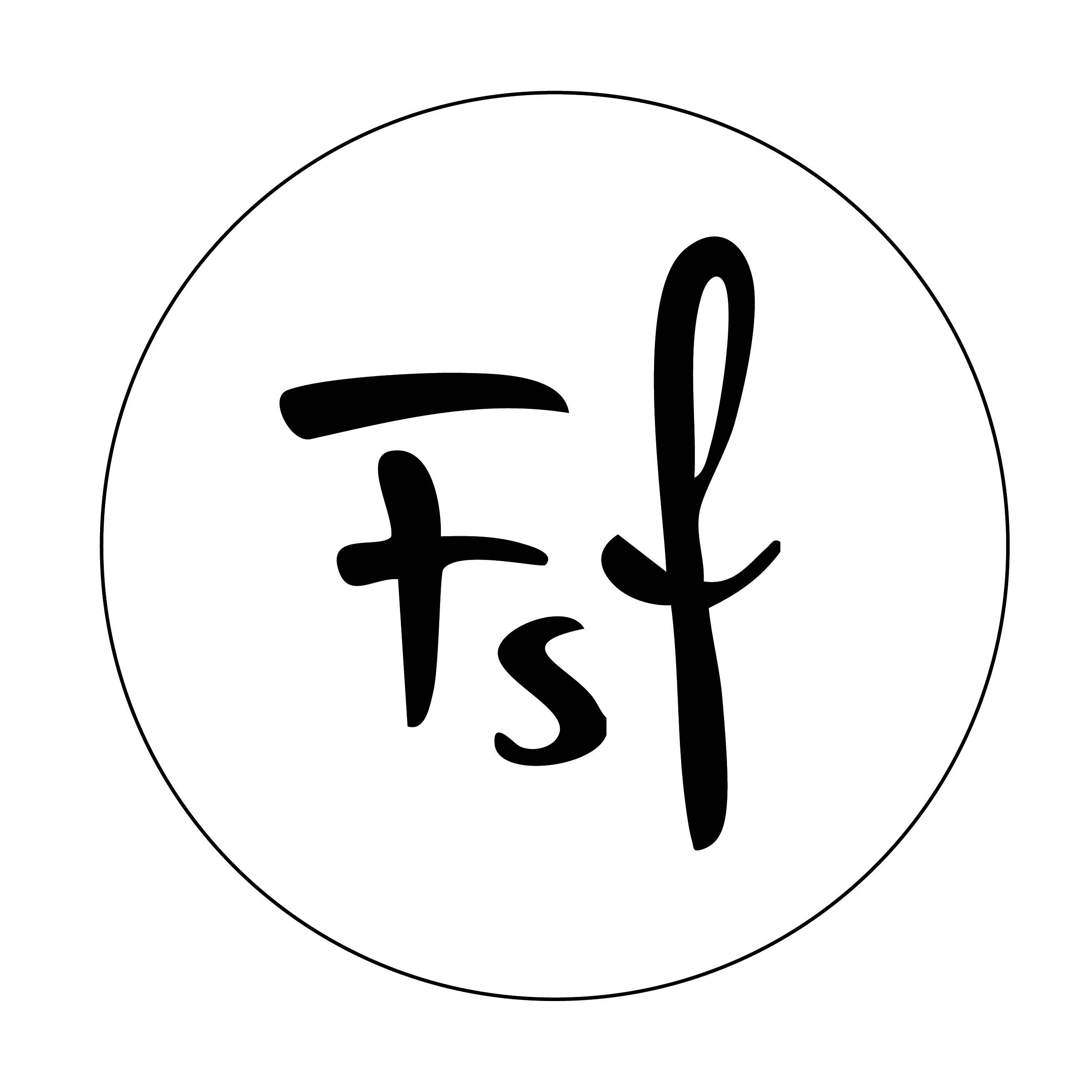
- Abbreviation: FSF
- Formation: 1919
- Type: Writer's organisation
- Headquarters: Annankatu 25, Kamppi, Helsinki, Finland
- Chair (ordförande): Hannele Mikaela Taivassalo
- Website: https://forfattarna.fi/

The Society of Swedish Authors in Finland (Swedish: Finlands svenska författareförening, abbreviated FSF) is an ideological and professional organization representing Finland Swedish fiction authors. The organization was founded in 1919 and had around 200 members in 2009. Its office is located on Annegatan (Annankatu) in central Helsingfors (Helsinki), Finland. Hannele Mikaela Taivassalo has served as chairperson since 2019.

== History ==
The Union of Finnish Writers had been founded in bilingual Finland in 1897. The decision to found a special association for Swedish-language writers in the country was made at a meeting on 11 January 1919 in the premises of the Artists’ Guild of Finland (Konstnärsgillet). The negotiations were led by Runar Schildt with Hagar Olsson as secretary. However, the original proposal preceding the decision had been presented by Werner Söderhjelm.

Originally, the Society fulfilled a social function for writers in and around Helsingfors. A Nordic focus was also emphasized, especially with fellow writers in Sweden. The Society's mission was also defined as monitoring and improving authors' economic and legal conditions, which remains among its core missions to this day.

During the 1960s, the Society developed into a trade union–like organization, in which issues of copyright and freedom of expression dominated. Since the beginning of the 21st century, the digitization of literature in the form of audio and e-books has challenged the authors' economic and copyright situation and has been addressed by the Society. In recent years, literature produced by or with the help of generative AI has also increasingly demanded attention.

== Purpose ==
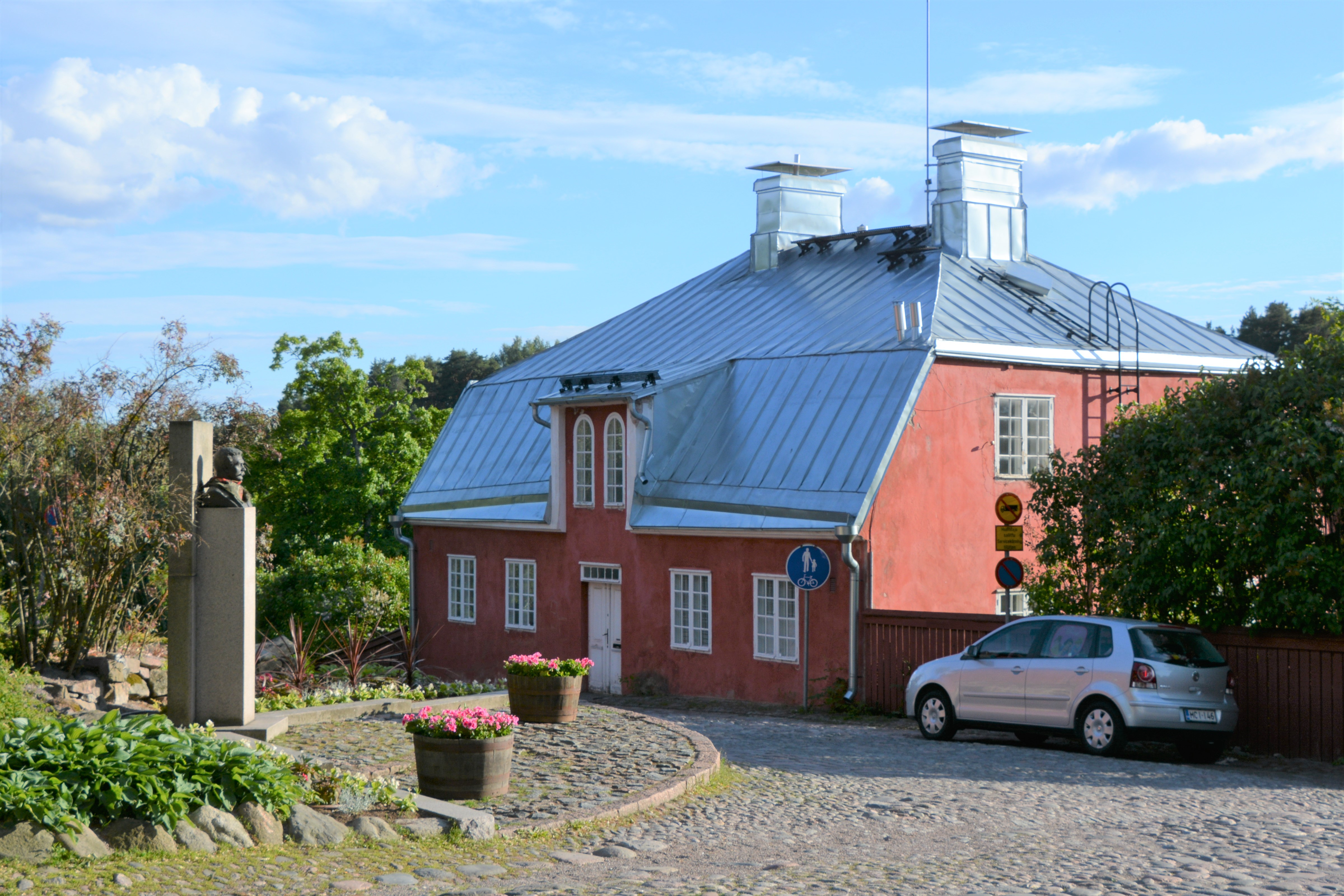
Diktarhemmet i Borgå (2016); photo Bengt Oberger

The Society's purpose is to develop and improve the conditions of professional fiction writers' work, to safeguard their moral, legal, and collective economic interests, including authors' rights, as well as to promote Finland-Swedish literature in general. It represents its members in contract negotiations with the Finnish Ministry of Education and Culture, book publishers and other contractual parties, and issues proposals and statements on cultural policy and literary matters.

=== Residency and scholarships ===
From 1921 to 2001, the Society owned the Diktarhemmet in Borgå (Porvoo), an honorary residence for Finland-Swedish writers. The house was donated by the publisher Holger Schildt and his wife Mathilda. According to the deed of gift, the property was to be owned outright by the association, on the condition that it be restored and maintained as a Finland-Swedish writers’ home, and that its first resident be the poet Hjalmar Procopé. In 2001, the Diktarhemmet was donated to the Society of Swedish Literature in Finland.

In 1969, the Society was given the Villa Biaudet in Lovisa (Loviisa) as a donation by the Swedish author Ulla Bjerne and her husband Léon Biaudet and the villa has since served as a scholarship residence for members.

The Society also awards membership scholarships from its own donation funds.

== Members ==
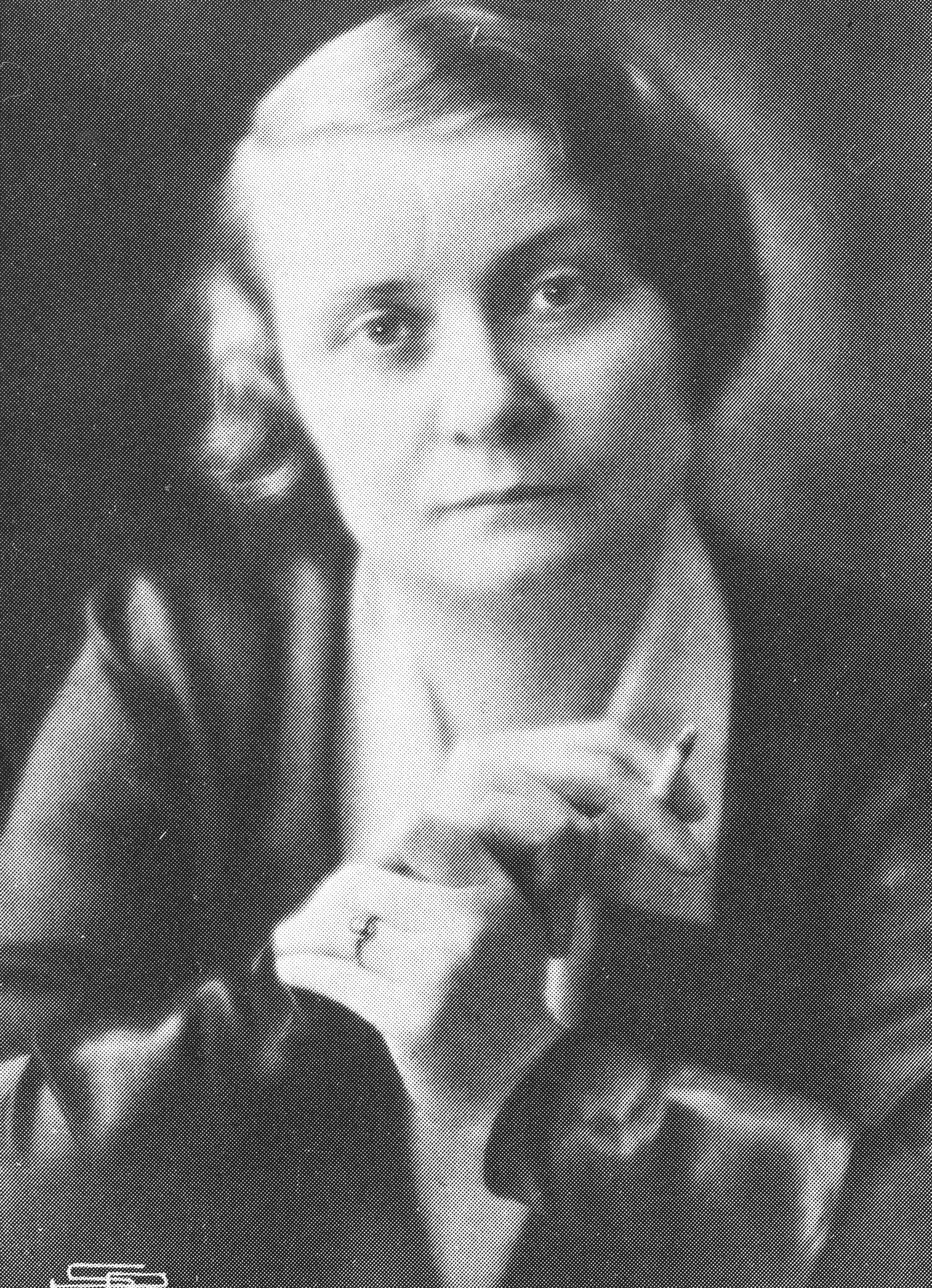
Hagar Olsson (1893–1978) was the first woman on the Society's board

Eligibility for ordinary membership is open to "Finland-Swedish authors who have published at least two original works of literary fiction in Swedish." The genre of the submitted works plays no role, but they must be of such a quality as to allow the applicant to be considered a professional, merited writer. The board approves or rejects applications for membership on the basis of these criteria.

=== Cooperation ===
Cooperation is established with several other organizations in Finland, among them the Union of Finish Writers, Association of Finnish Nonfiction Writers, Finnish Reading Centre, Sanasto Copyright Society and FILI – Finnish Literature Exchange, and the Society is a member of several Nordic and international organizations, such as the Baltic Centre for Writers and Translators and the European Writers' Council.

== Leadership ==
The Society is led by an elected board consisting of eight members and two deputy members. The chairperson is elected for two years.

The first woman to serve on the board was Hagar Olsson, elected as a deputy member in 1921, and the first female chair was Agneta Ara, who served from 1995 to 1998.

=== Chairpersons ===
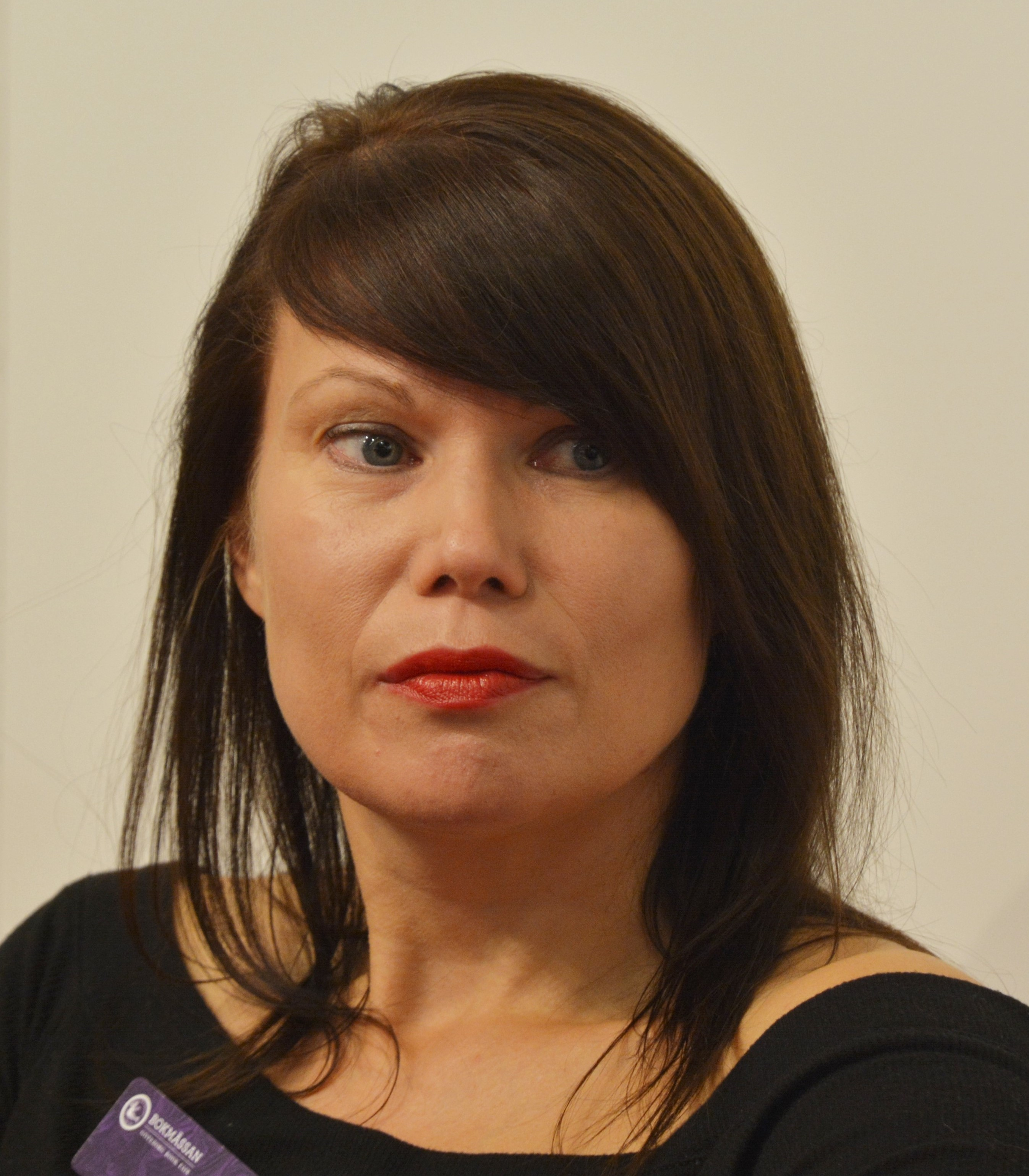
Hannele Mikaela Taivassalo (b. 1974) has served as chairperson of the Society of Swedish Authors in Finland since 2019; photo Bengt Oberger (2016)

- 1919–1920 Bertel Gripenberg
- 1920–1922 Arvid Mörne
- 1922–1924 Eirik Hornborg
- 1924–1929 Gunnar Castrén
- 1930–1931 Arvid Mörne
- 1932–1933 Eirik Hornborg
- 1929–1930 Emil Zilliacus
- 1931–1932 Henrik Hildén
- 1932–1936 Emil Zilliacus
- 1936–1937 Hans Ruin
- 1937–1938 Richard Malmberg ("Gustav Alm")
- 1938–1943 Olof Enckell
- 1943–1945 Hans Ruin
- 1945–1953 Ragnar Ekelund
- 1953–1956 Per Olof Barck
- 1956–1961 J.O. Tallqvist
- 1961–1973 Carl Fredrik Sandelin
- 1973–1978 Lars Huldén
- 1978–1983 Claes Andersson
- 1983–1988 Johan Bargum
- 1988–1995 Ingmar Svedberg
- 1995–1998 Agneta Ara
- 1998–2007 Thomas Wulff
- 2007–2013 Mikaela Strömberg (Sundström)
- 2013–2019 Peter Sandström
- 2019–2026 Hannele Mikaela Taivassalo
