= Lars Huldén =

Finnish writer, scholar and translator (1926–2016)

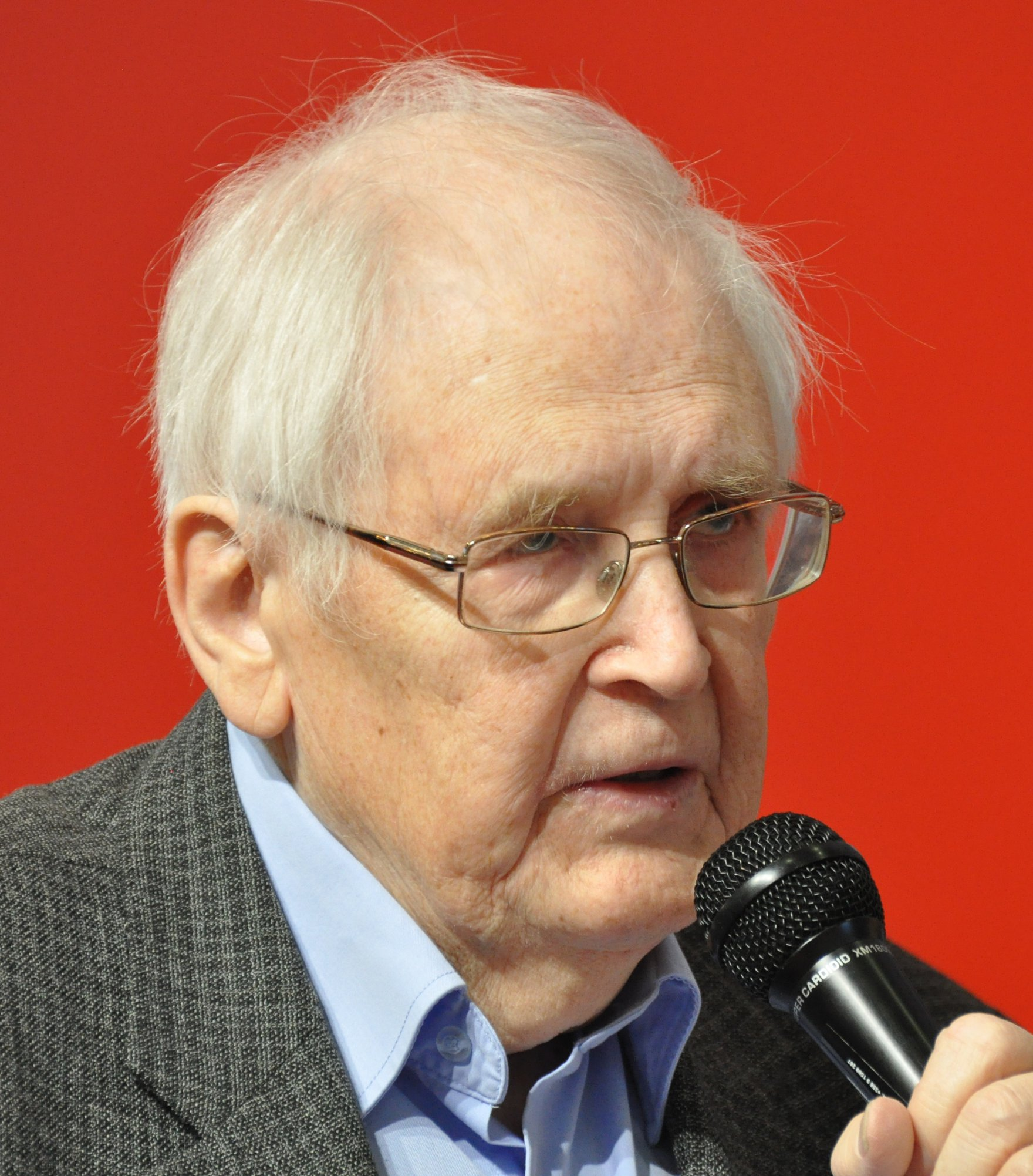
Lars Huldén in 2012.

Lars Evert Huldén (5 February 1926 – 11 October 2016) was a Finland-Swedish writer, scholar and translator. Born in Jakobstad, Finland, to the writer Elis Evert Huldén and the teacher Ester Sofia Nyvik, he was professor at University of Helsinki 1964–1989, having received his doctorate there in 1957. In 1986 Huldén received an honorary doctorate from the Faculty of Humanities at Uppsala University, Sweden. He was a member of the Norwegian Academy of Science and Letters from 1993. He was married to Ingeborg Helena Slotte from 1948. He also served as chairman of the Society of Swedish Authors in Finland from 1972 to 1978 and of the Society of Swedish Literature in Finland from 1983.

He has researched Carl Michael Bellman, Johan Ludvig Runeberg, Swedish dialects and toponomy. His own literary work began with the 1958 poetry collection Dräpa näcken and also included plays, song lyrics, and libretti.Among his many translations into Swedish were William Shakespeare's King Lear, Aristophanes' Peace, and the libretto for Aulis Sallinen's opera The Red Line.

Lars Huldén and his son Mats Huldén translated Kalevala into Swedish in 1999. Huldén died at the age of 90 on 11 October 2016 in Helsinki.

== Awards and honors ==
In 2000, he won the Swedish Academy Nordic Prize, known as the "little Nobel". He was also a recipient of the Finnish State Prize for Literature (in 1965, 1974, and 1982) and a prize from the Swedish Academy in 1980.
