= Jaakko Syrjä =

Finnish writer (1926–2022)

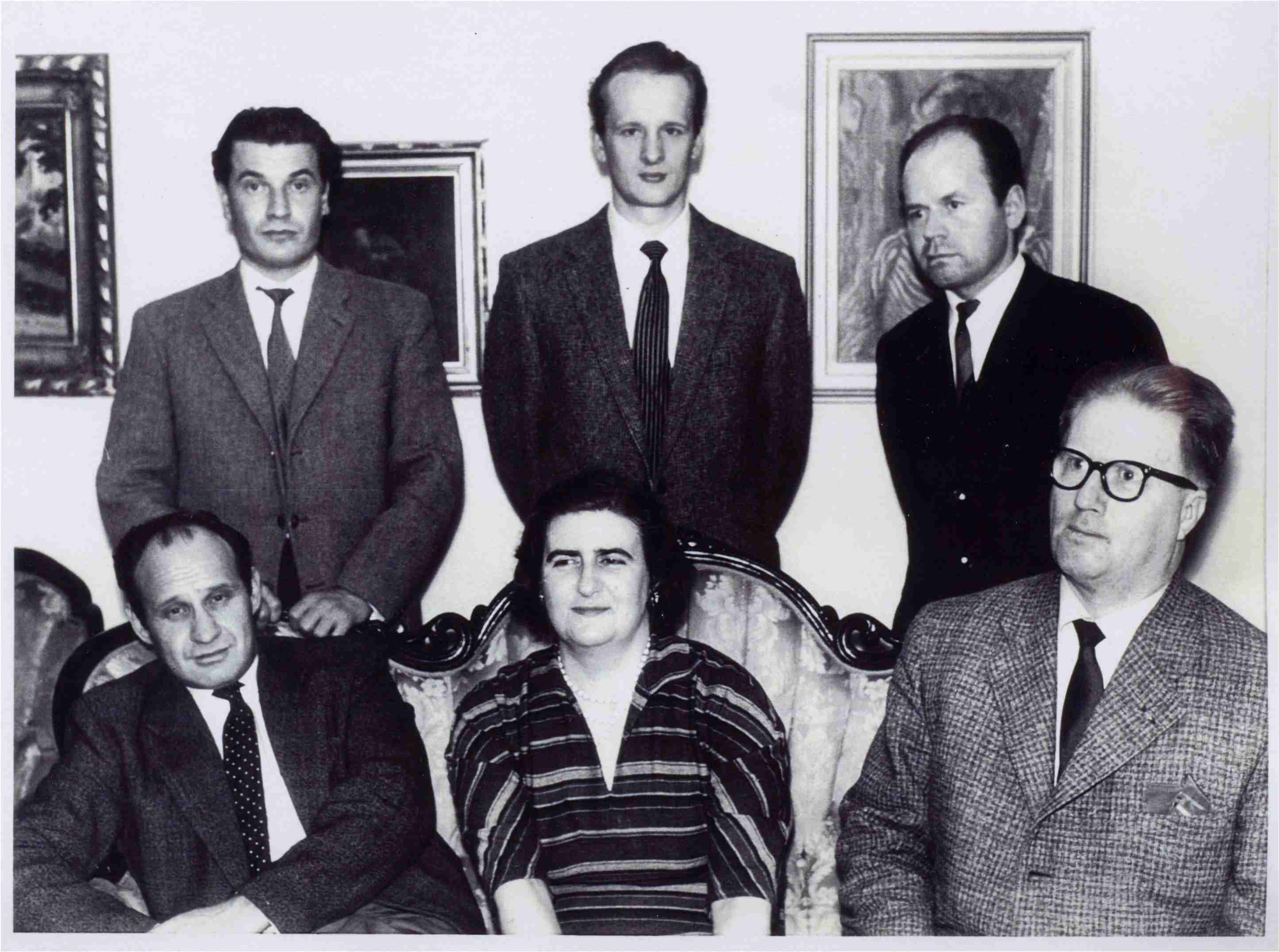
- Syrjä (center in the back) with Harri Kaasalainen and Veikko Pihlajamaki, Soile Kaukovalta and Ilpo Kaukovalta in 1958
- Born: 7 March 1926; Pälkäne, Finland
- Died: 22 May 2022 (aged 96); Ylöjärvi, Finland
- Occupation: Writer
- Spouse: Kirsi Kunnas
- Children: 2

Jaakko Syrjä (7 March 1926 – 22 May 2022) was a Finnish writer. He served as the president of the Union of Finnish Writers from 1975 to 1980.

== Biography ==
Syrjä was born in Pälkäne, the son of Martta née Niemiö and Juho Nestori Syrjä, who were both cattle traders and farmers. At the age of seven, he and his family moved from Hirsilä to Korkeakoski. Syrjä then moved to Tampere, where he worked for the railroad equipment and steam locomotive manufacturing company Lokomo. In 1953 his story "There came the Bear" won the Best Short Story prize in the Pirkanmaa Writing Competition.

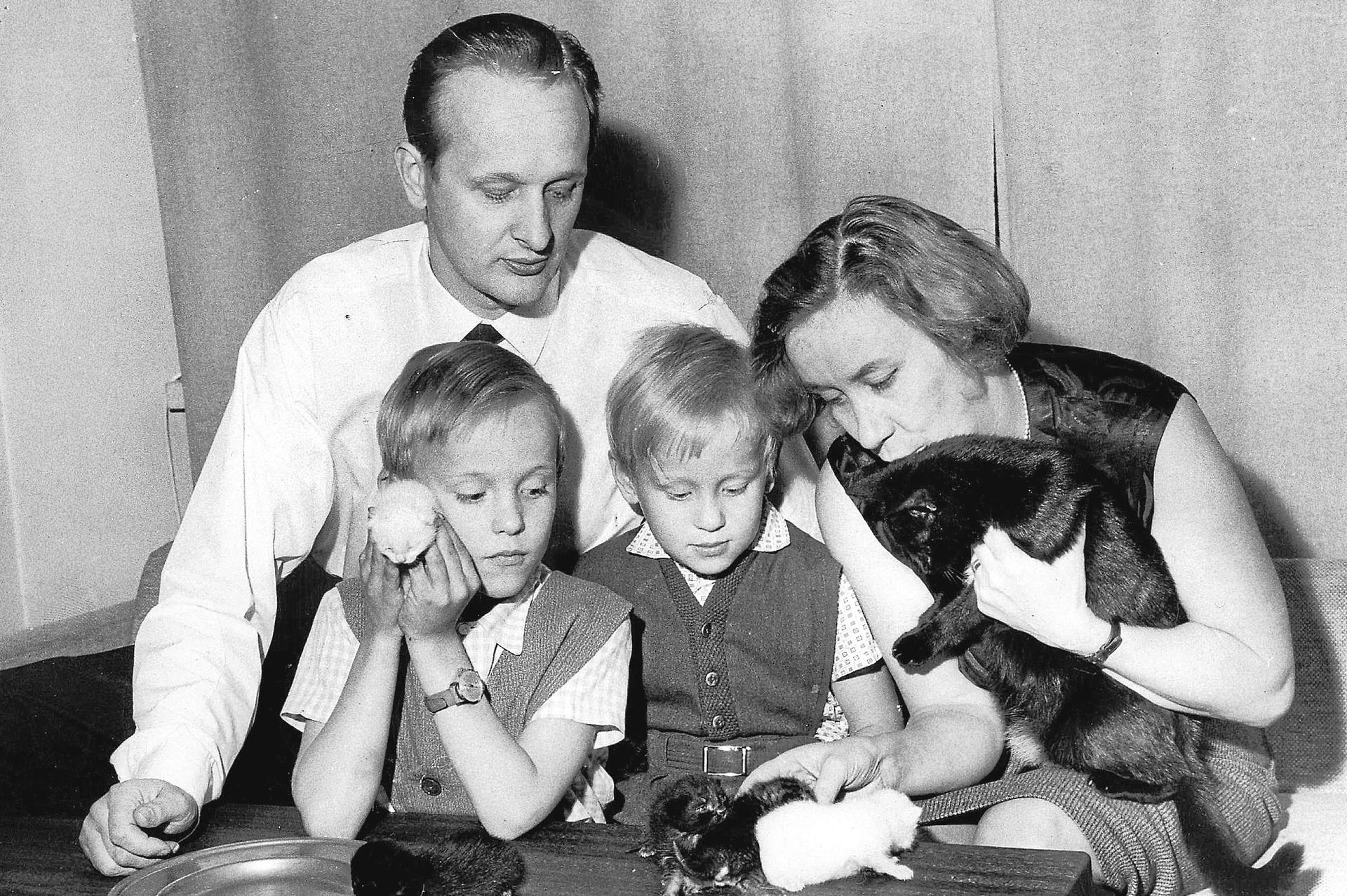
Syrjä (left) with his wife, Kirsi Kunnas and their two children

He later worked as an editor for Gummerus and WSOY.

In 1957, Syrjä married poet and children's literature author Kirsi Kunnas.

Syrjä was a member of the Union of Finnish Writers from 1970 to 1975, and president from 1975 to 1980. He worked with novelist Kalle Päätalo adapting works for publication. Syrjä was a member of the Väinö Linna Society.

Syrjä won the City of Tampere Literature Prize three times from 1956 to 1988. He also was a winner of the Thanks for the Book Award in 1966. Syrjä was nominated for the Finlandia Prize in 1988. He was a winner of the Väinö Linna Prize in 2005. In 2016, Syrjä was awarded the Pirkanmaa Art Prize by the Pirkanmaa Arts Council.

Kunnas died in her sleep at home in Ylöjärvi on 8 November 2021, at the age of 96. Six months later, on 22 May 2022, at a care home in Ylöjärvi, Syrjä died of COVID-19, also at the age of 96.
