= Tiina Raevaara =

Finnish writer

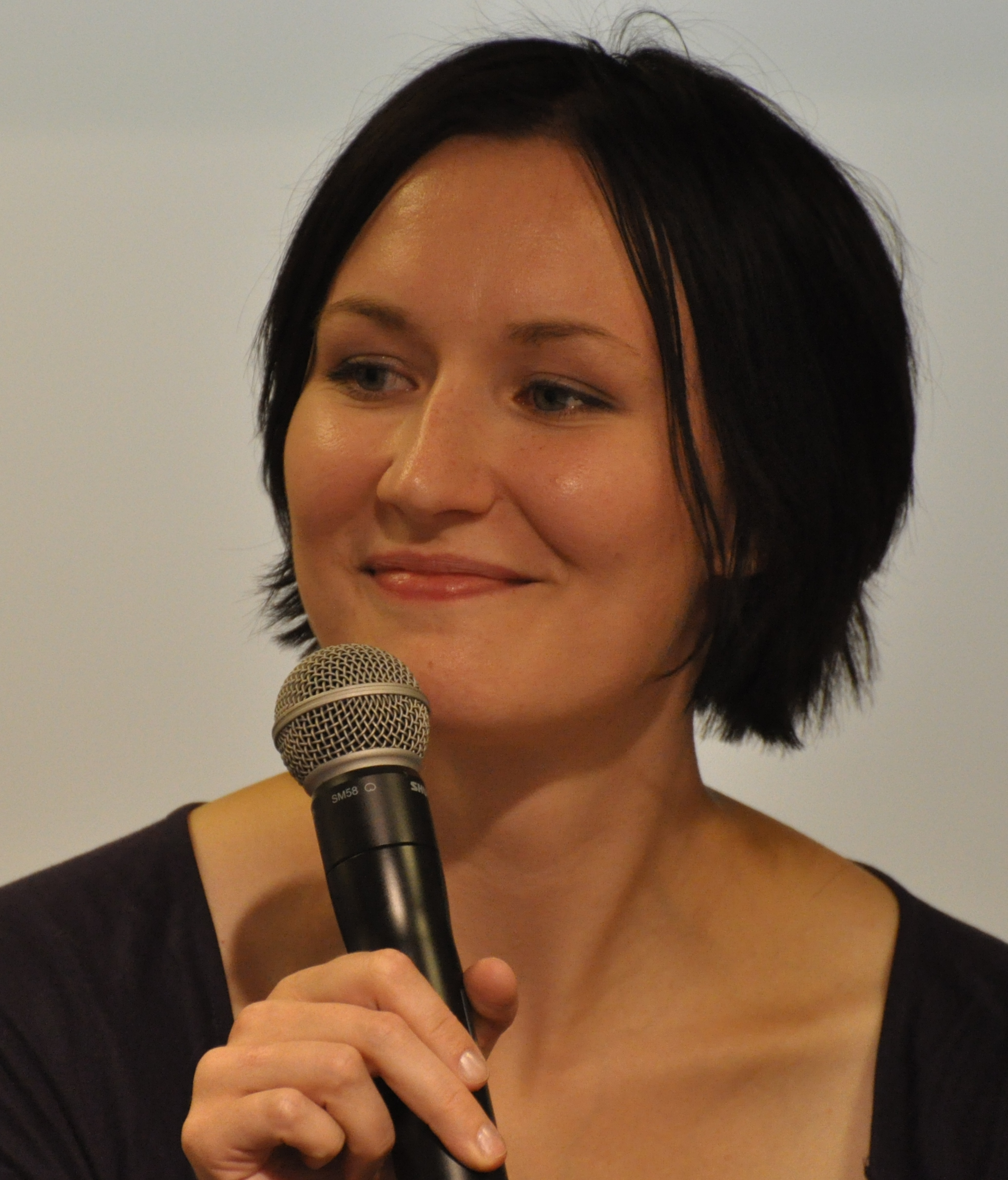
Tiina Raevaara in 2011

Tiina Raevaara (born 5 March 1979 in Kerava) is a Finnish writer, best known for her debut novel Eräänä päivänä tyhjä taivas (transl. One day an empty sky) (2008), and a collection of short stories En tunne sinua vierelläni (transl. I don't feel you next to me) (2010), for which she won the Runeberg Prize in 2011.

Awards
Preceded by Kari Hotakainen	Winner of the Runeberg Prize; 2011	Succeeded by Katja Kettu
