= Gummerus =

Finnish publisher

Gummerus Oy is a Finnish media group that was founded in Jyväskylä in 1872 by Karl Jacob Gummerus. In 1985, it moved its headquarters from Jyväskylä to Helsinki. In 2008, it had an annual turnover of EUR 26,9 million. Annually, it publishes approximately 200 new titles, which are sold in bookstores, department stores and book clubs.

Gummerus Oy consists of four divisions:

- Gummerus Kustannus Oy
- Kielikone Oy
- Kirjatori Oy
- Gummerus Kiinteistöt Oy

In December 2009 Gummerus and Sanoma agreed on an arrangement concerning the merger of WS Bookwell and Gummerus Printing. As a result of the arrangement, Gummerus Oy became a shareholder in the new Bookwell Oy with a 20% holding.

In May 2001 Gummerus Publishers acquired an independent, smaller publishing firm by the name of Ajatus Kustannusosakeyhtiö, and Ajatus Kirjat remains an editorially independent non-fiction entity within the main publishing firm. Jaakko Syrjä served as an editor.

== Establishing ==
Karl Jacob Gummerus, (April 13, 1840 Kokkola – March 20, 1898 Helsinki) begin to publish Kyläkirjasto reader in 1872. It is estimated that the Gummerus Oy publishing company actually started then in Jyväskylä.

Karl and his wife Gustava wanted to bring knowledge and joy to folk. Finally he became a writer.

=== Works ===
- Ylhäiset ja alhaiset (1870) - the company's first published book
- Alkuperäisiä suomalaisia uuteloita (1863–73(
- Haudankaivajan kertomuksia and Vanhan pastorin muistelmia.
