= Agneta Ara =

Swedo-Finnish author and translator

Agneta Birgitta Ara (née Laurent; born 4 October 1945) is a Finland-Swedish author and translator. She debuted in 1975 with the poetry collection Det är redan en annan dag and is a prominent representative of Finland-Swedish literature.

Ara was born in Helsinki. Her sister is the sculptor Birgitta Ara, and their parents were the opera singer Ture Ara and the actress Birgit Kronström. Ara graduated in 1973 and received her Bachelor of Arts degree from the University of Helsinki in 1980. Early in her career, she worked as an office assistant at Teollistamisrahasto Oy in 1966–1967 and as a correspondent at Rautakonttori Oy in 1969–1972. Ara was a secretary at the Bank of Finland in 1973–1974 and 1978–1980, and began working as a freelance writer in 1980.

She was a board member of the Society of Swedish Authors in Finland (Finlands svenska författareförening) 1985–1991 and chairman 1995–1998, a member of the board of Finland's Reading Center 1988–1991 and 1994–1995, and a member of the Swedish Literature Promotion Committee 1992–2002. In the years 2003–2007, Ara was vice-chairman of Finland's Center for the Promotion of Literature (Finnish: Kirjallisuuden edistämiskeskus, KIDE) and a member of the board of the copyright organization Sanasto ry 2005–2010. She has also been a member of the church council for St. Henry's Cathedral 2000–2006 and a member of the board of the Finnish-Mexican cultural exchange support association 2006–2008.

Ara was married to Hans Fors 1974—1976 and Nils Laurent 1982—1986.

== Bibliography ==
- 1975 – Det är redan en annan dag
- 1977 – Det är som i dikter
- 1978 – Fjäril av järn (radio play)
- 1979 – Hästens hjärta
- 1982 – Omfamningen
- 1983 – Korta stund
- 1986 – Glömska, eld
- 1987 – Ministerns gardiner (radio play)
- 1990 – Antonio Gades kommer inte (novel)
- 1995 – Huset med de glömda dörrarna (novel)
- 2007 – Det har varit kallt i Madrid (novel)
- 2013 – Baton Rouge

=== Translations ===
- 1975 – Maijaliisa Dieckmann: Ari Virtanen, 8 år
- 1976 – Yukio Mishima: Drömkudden
- 1976 – Eila Pennanen: Tillsammans
- 1977 – Nodar Dumbadze och G. Lordkipanidze: Jag, Mömmö, Uiko och Illarion
- 1978 – Hella Wuolijoki: Niskavuoris bröd (radio play)
- 1993 – Tommy Hellsten: Flodhästen i vardagsrummet: om medberoende och om mötet med barnet inom oss (original title: Vitahepo olohuoneessa)
- 1999 – Tommy Hellsten: Flodhästen på arbetsplatsen (original title: Virtahepo työpaikalla)

== Awards ==
- 1976 – Prize from the Society of Swedish Literature in Finland
- 1978 – Längmanska kulturfonden's Finland-prize
- 1991 – Stateprize for literature (Finnish: Kirjallisuuden valtionpalkinto)
- 1996 – Runeberg prize for Huset med de glömda dörrarna
- 2007 – Nominated for Finlandia prize for Det har varit kallt i Madrid
