= The Grey Dance =

1928 painting by Väinö Kunnas

Coordinates: 60.1700°N 24.9442°E

- Asetelma, jossa kaksi mallinukkea tanssivassa asennossa. (Finnish)
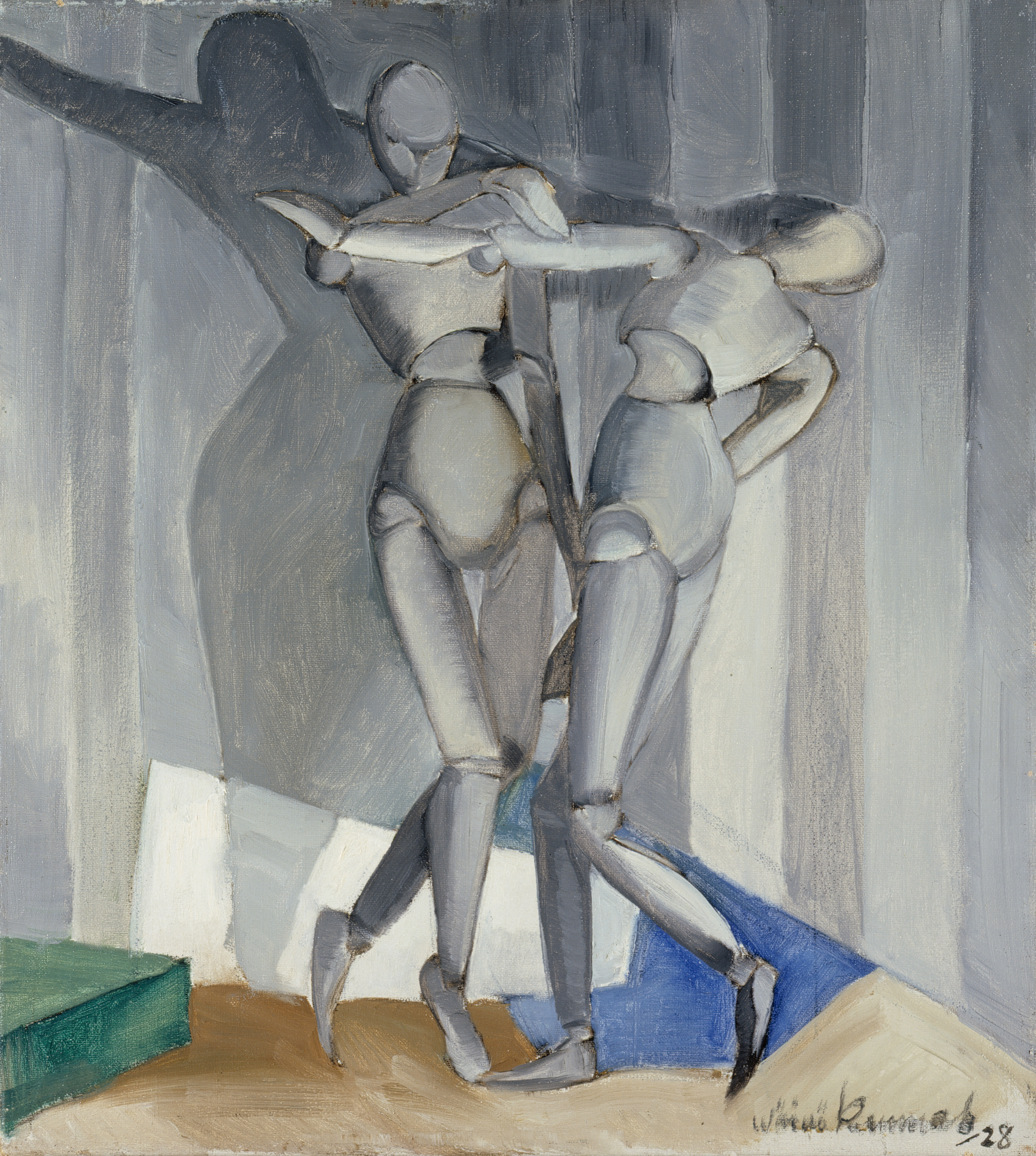
- Artist: Väinö Kunnas
- Year: 1928
- Medium: oil on canvas
- Dimensions: 63.5 cm × 57 cm (25.0 in × 22 in)
- Location: Ateneum; Helsinki

The Grey Dance is a painting by Väinö Kunnas, from 1928.

== Description ==
The painting has dimensions 63.5 x 57 centimeters. It is in the collection of the Ateneum, Helsinki.

== Analysis ==
The painting is a still life with two dummies with articulated joints posed as dancing.
