= Korkeakoski =

- Village
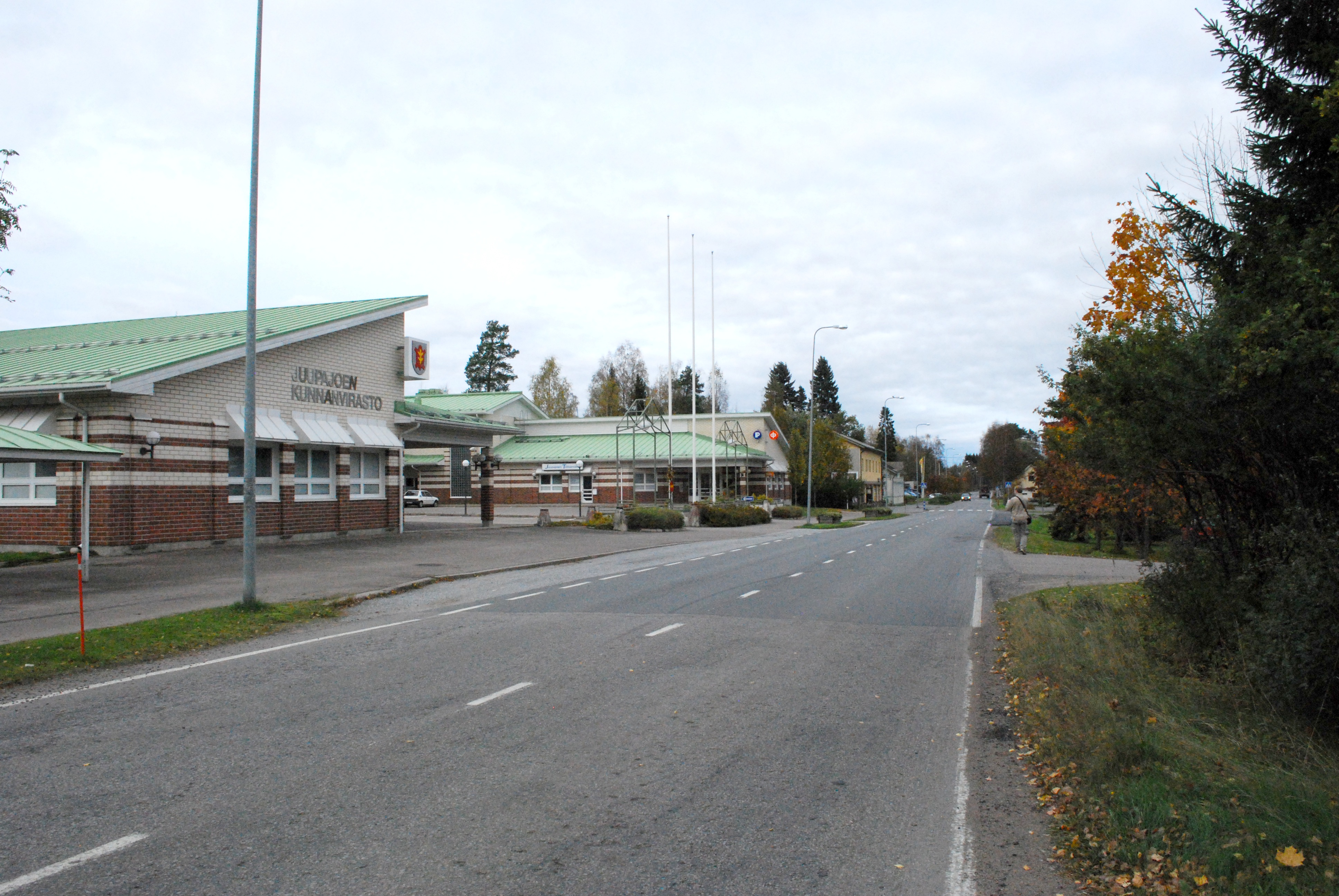
- The centre of Korkeakoski

- Location in Finland
- Country: Finland
- Region: Pirkanmaa
- Municipality: Juupajoki

Area
  - Total: 4.52 km^{2} (1.75 sq mi)

Population (2020-12-31)
  - Total: 822
  - Density: 1,819/km^{2} (4,710/sq mi)
- Time zone: UTC+2 (EET)
  - Summer (DST): UTC+3 (EEST)
- Postal code: 35500

Korkeakoski (Finnish pronunciation: [ˈkorkeɑˌkoski]) is a village and administrative center of the Juupajoki municipality in Pirkanmaa, Finland. It has a population of 822. It is located along Highway 58 between Orivesi and Kärsämäki, and the Tampere–Haapamäki railway runs through its center.

In Korkeakoski there is a municipal hall, a health center, a school for grades 3-9 and a Sale grocery store. Finland's first mechanized shoe factory called Wallenius Wapriikki, founded by Edward Wallenius in 1898, is also located in Korkeakoski.

== See also ==
- Korkeakoski railway station
