= Aulikki Oksanen =

Finnish writer

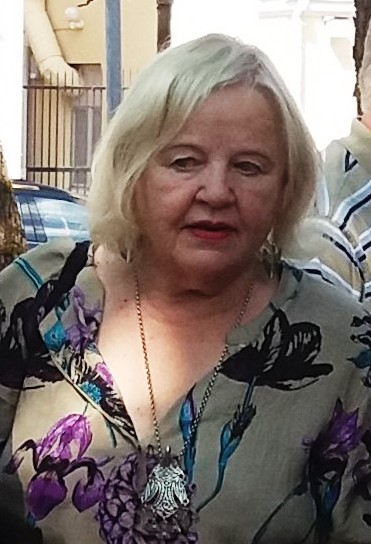
Vuokko Aulikki Oksanen-Halonen

Vuokko Aulikki Oksanen-Halonen (born 19 July 1944, in Karvia) is a Finnish writer. She was awarded the Runeberg Prize in 1991, and the Pro Finlandia medal in 2020.
