= Juupajoki =

- Municipality
- Juupajoen kunta Juupajoki kommun
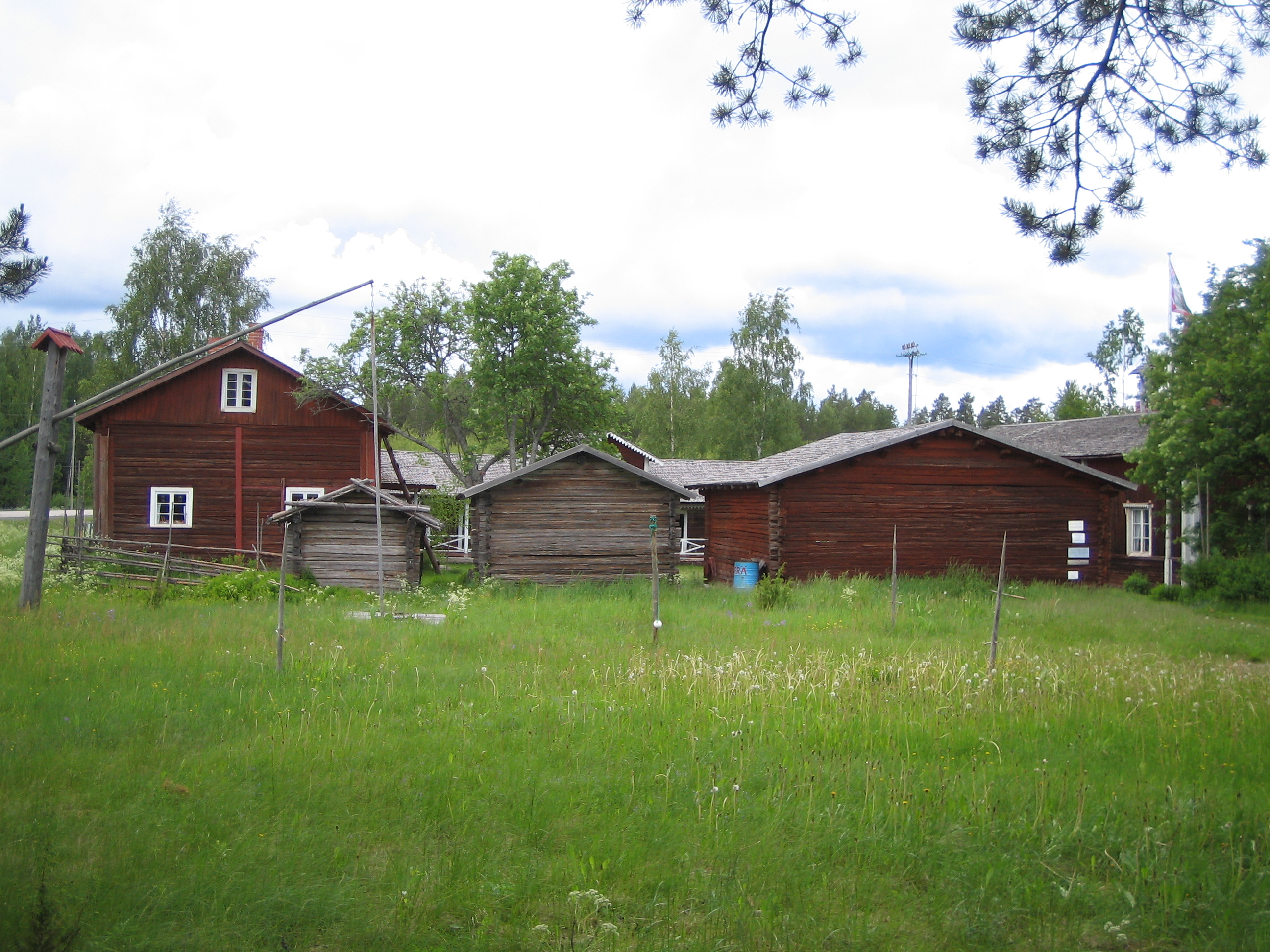
- Kallenaution kievari, a café museum in Juupajoki

- Coat of arms

- Location of Juupajoki in Finland
- Interactive map of Juupajoki
- Coordinates: 61°47.8′N 024°22.2′E
- Country: Finland
- Region: Pirkanmaa
- Sub-region: Upper Pirkanmaa
- Charter: 1913
- Seat: Korkeakoski

Government
  - Municipal manager: Riku Siren

Area (2018-01-01)
  - Total: 274.95 km^{2} (106.16 sq mi)
  - Land: 258.49 km^{2} (99.80 sq mi)
  - Water: 16.47 km^{2} (6.36 sq mi)
  - Rank: 242nd largest in Finland

Population (2025-12-31)
  - Total: 1,663
  - Rank: 274th largest in Finland
  - Density: 6.43/km^{2} (16.7/sq mi)

Population by native language
  - Finnish: 97.9% (official)
  - Others: 2.1%

Population by age
  - 0 to 14: 13.6%
  - 15 to 64: 53.9%
  - 65 or older: 32.5%
- Time zone: UTC+02:00 (EET)
  - Summer (DST): UTC+03:00 (EEST)
- Website: juupajoki.fi/en/

Juupajoki is a municipality of Finland. It is located in the Pirkanmaa region. The municipality has a population of 1,663 (31 December 2025), which makes it the least populous municipality in Pirkanmaa. It covers an area of 274.95 square kilometres (106.16 sq mi) of which 16.47 km^{2} (6.36 sq mi) is water. The population density is 6.43 inhabitants per square kilometre (16.7/sq mi). Korkeakoski is the administrative center of the municipality.

Neighbouring municipalities are Jämsä, Mänttä-Vilppula, Orivesi and Ruovesi. The city of Tampere is located 56 kilometres (35 mi) southwest of Juupajoki.

The municipality is unilingually Finnish.

== People ==
- Kauko Helovirta (1924–1997), writer
- Jaakko Syrjä (1926–2022), writer

== Gallery ==
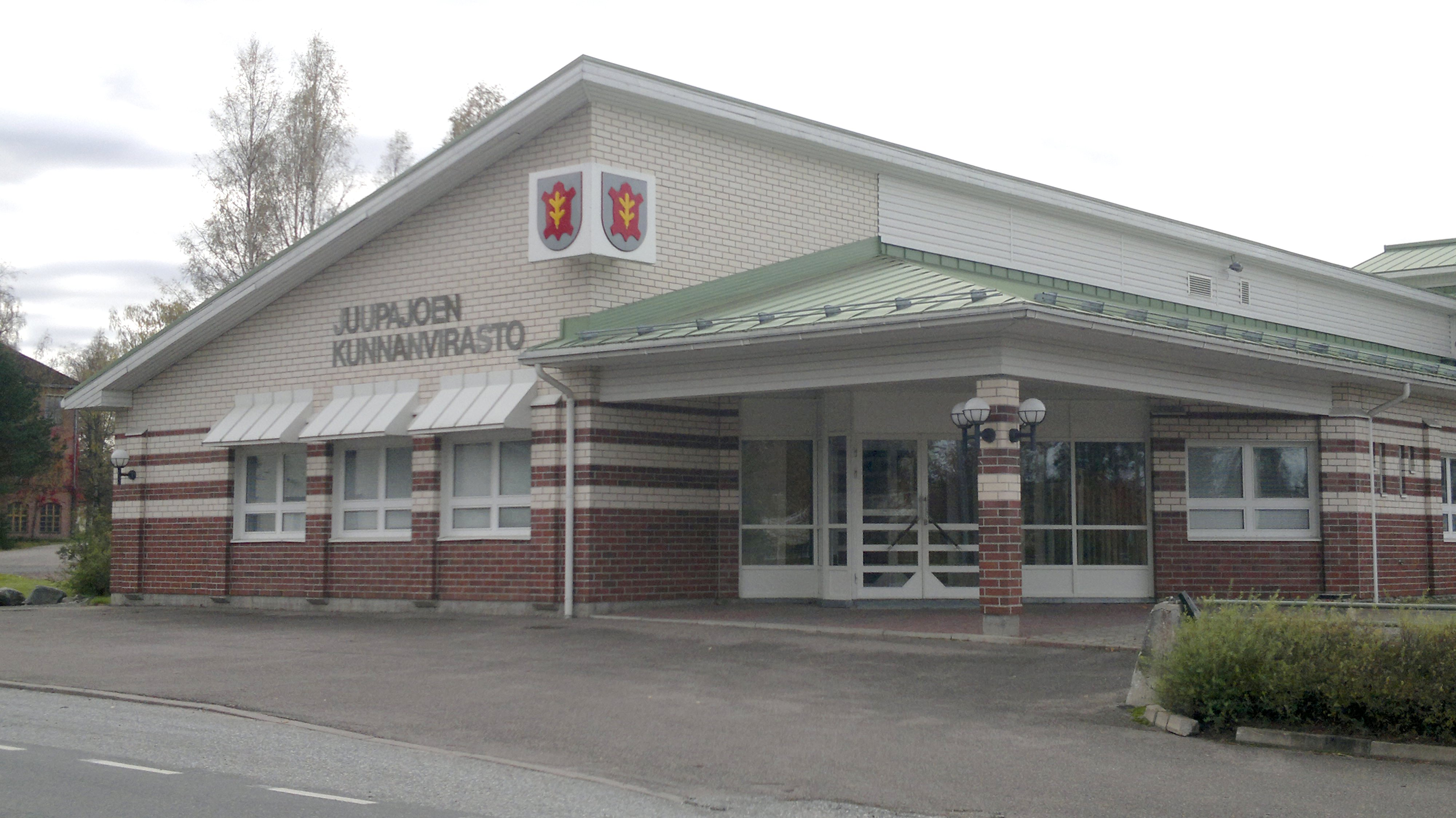
Borough hall of Juupajoki

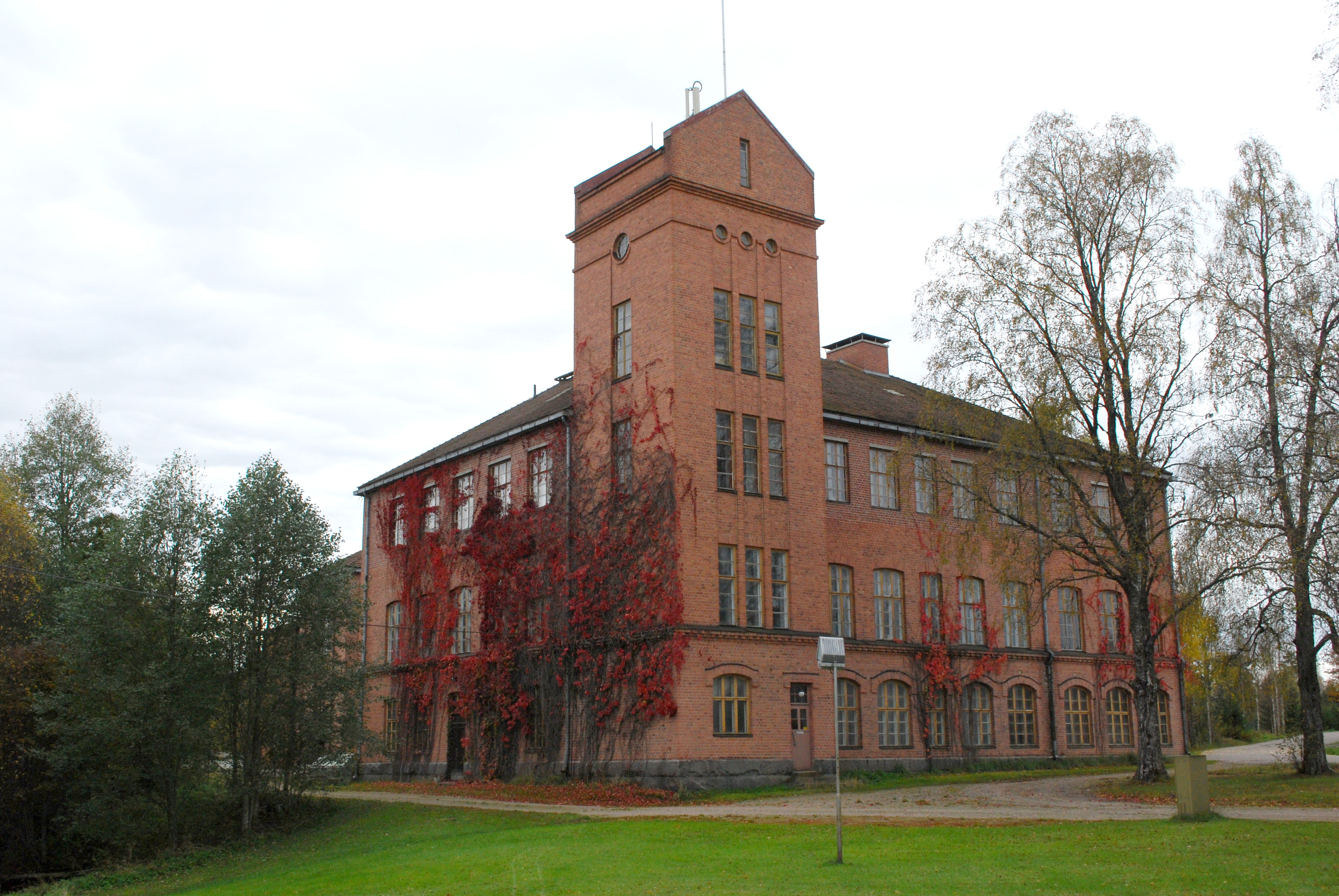
Korkeakoski's old shoe factory at Juupajoki

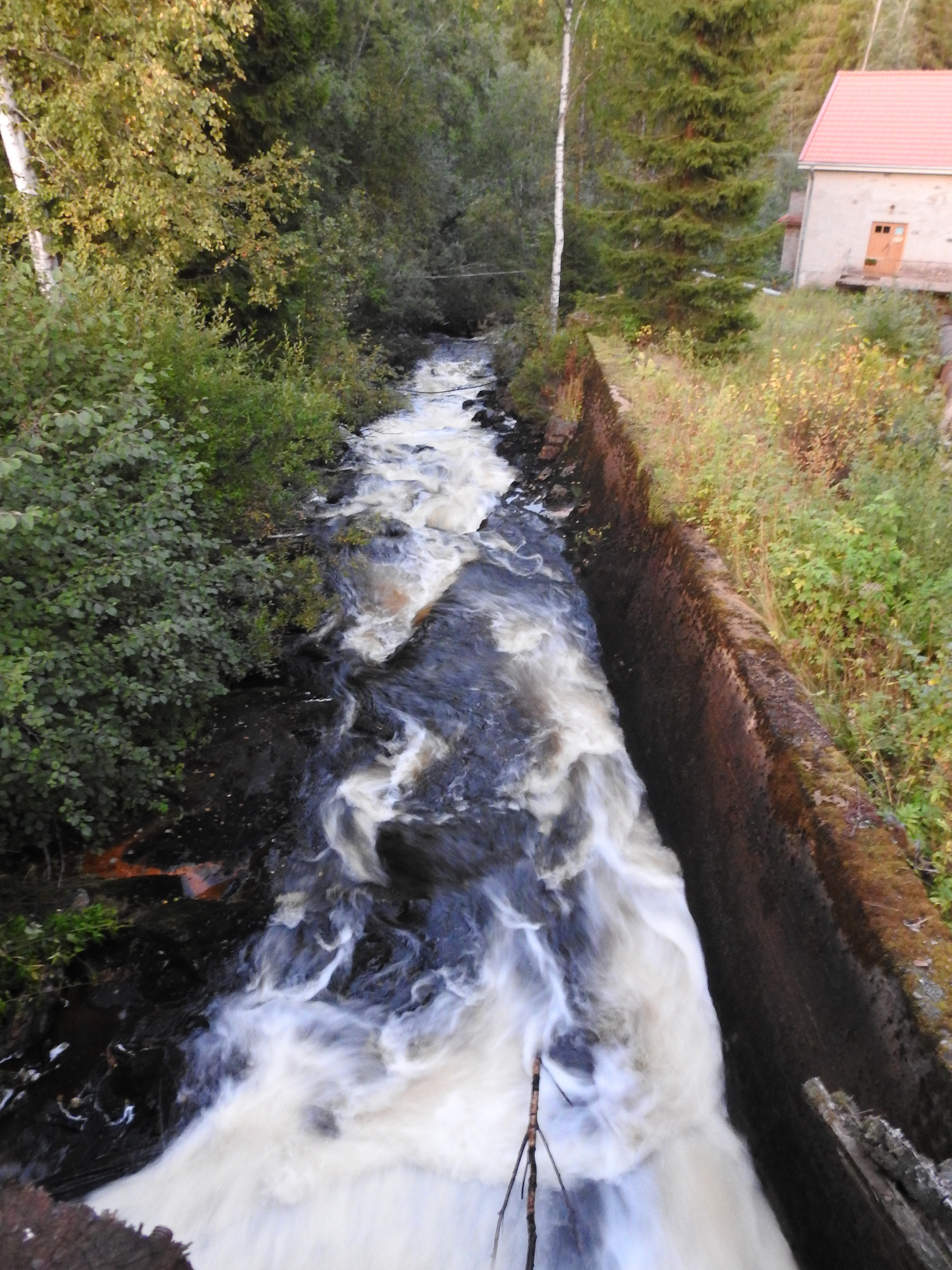
Korkeakoski River

== See also ==
- Finnish national road 58
