= Kirsi Kunnas =

Finnish author, poet, and translator (1924–2021)

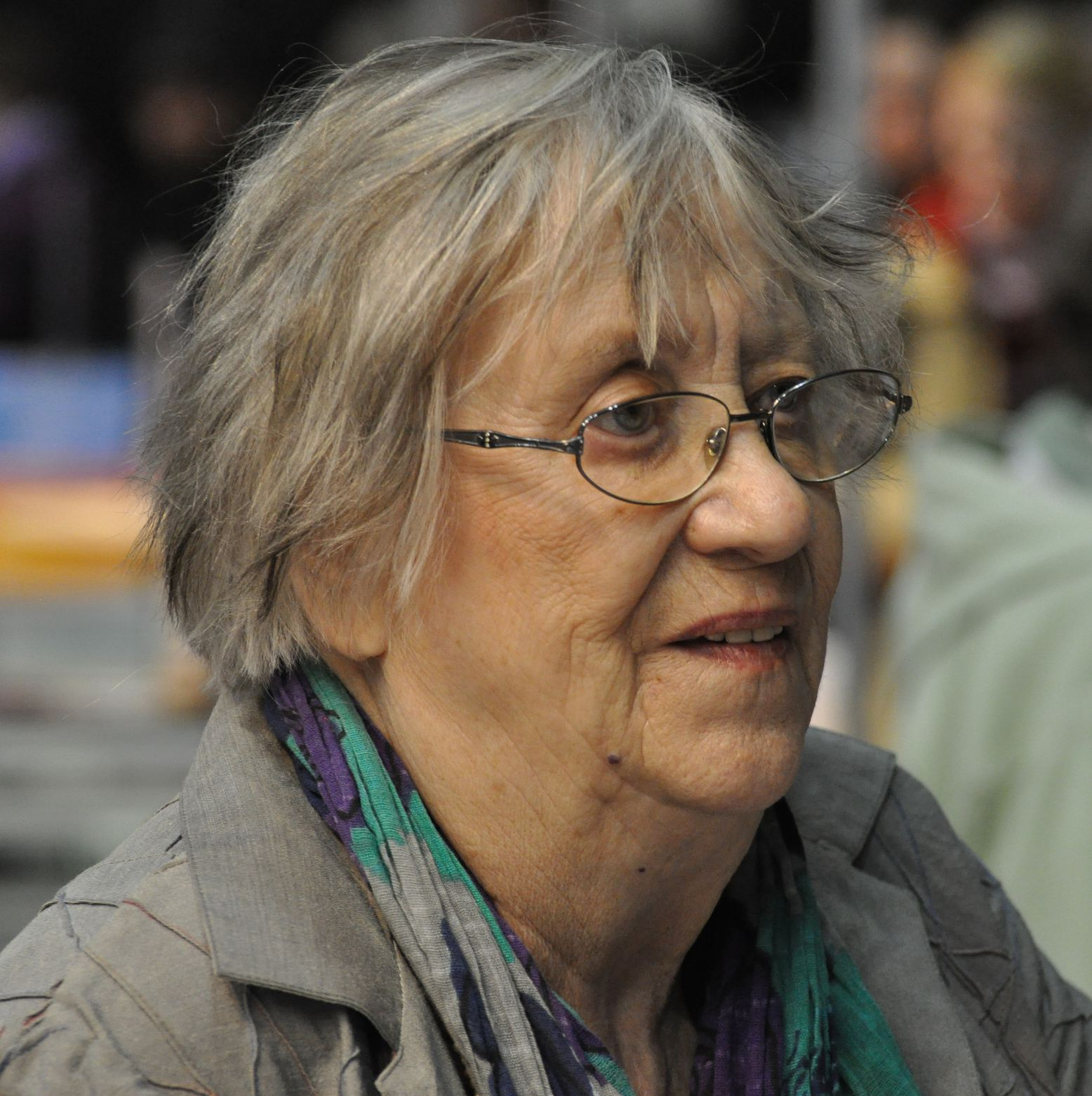
- Kunnas in 2012
- Born: Kirsi Marjatta Kunnas; 14 December 1924; Helsinki, Finland
- Died: 8 November 2021 (aged 96); Ylöjärvi, Finland
- Citizenship: Finland
- Occupations: Poet, translator
- Spouse: Jaakko Syrjä
- Children: Martti Syrjä, Mikko Syrjä
- Writing career
- Language: Finnish

Kirsi Marjatta Kunnas (14 December 1924 – 8 November 2021) was a Finnish poet, children's literature author and translator into Finnish. Her oeuvre consists of poems, fairy tale books, drama, translations (e.g. Lewis Carroll, Federico García Lorca) and non-fiction. Her books have been translated into Swedish, English, German, French, Hungarian, Estonian and Polish. She received several awards in Finland for her literary work.

== Personal life ==
Her parents were visual artists Väinö and Sylvi Kunnas. Her father died from pneumonia when she was four. Her mother then married art critic Einari Vehmas.

Kunnas married author Jaakko Syrjä in 1957. Their sons are singer/songwriter Martti Syrjä and guitarist Mikko Syrjä of Eppu Normaali.

Kunnas died in her sleep at her home in Ylöjärvi on 8 November 2021, at the age of 96. Her widower Jaakko Syrjä died six months later on 22 May 2022 from COVID-19, also at the age of 96.

== Bibliography ==
=== Poetry ===
- Villiomenapuu (1947)
- Uivat saaret (1950)
- Tuuli nousee (1953)
- Vaeltanut (1956)
- Valikoima runoja (1958)
- Kuun kuva meissä (1980)
- Kaunis hallayö (1984)
- Valoa kaikki kätketty (1986)
- Puut kantavat valoa, poems 1947–1986 and translated work (1999)

=== Children's poetry, nursery rhymes ===
- Tiitiäisen satupuu (1956)
- Puupuu ja käpypoika (1972)
- Hassut aakkoset (1975)
- Hanhiemon iloinen lipas (1978), the Finnish translation of Mother Goose
- Kani Koipeliinin kuperkeikat (1979)
- Sirkusjuttuja (1985)
- Tiitiäisen pippurimylly (1991)
- Tiitiäisen tuluskukkaro (2000)
- Tiitiäisen runolelu (2002)
- Tapahtui Tiitiäisen maassa (selection from books Tiitiäisen satupuu, Tiitiäisen tarinoita, Puupuu ja Käpypoika, Sirkusjuttuja, Kani Koipeliinin kuperkeikat, Tiitiäisen pippurimylly, Tiitiäisen tuluskukkaro, Puut kantavat valoa, Tiitiäisen runolelu) (2004)

=== Fairy tale books, primers ===
- Tiitiäisen tarinoita (1957)
- Aikamme aapinen / by Kirsi Kunnas and workgroup (1968)
- Aikamme lukukirja: 2–5 / by Kirsi Kunnas and workgroup (1969–1972)

=== Picture books ===
- Kuin kissat ja koirat (Like cats and dogs)(1967)
- Kutut kotona (1967)
- Pikku lemmikit (1967)
- Terveisiä Afrikasta (1967)
- Hau hau koiranpennut (1968)
- Kis kis kissanpennut (1968)
- Etelän eläimiä – Tiedätkö että. 1–6. Together with Kyllikki Röman (1969)
- Lintuystävämme – Tietoa linnuista. 1–6. Together with Kyllikki Röman (1969)
- Pohjolan eläimiä – Tarua ja totta. 1–6. Together with Kyllikki Röman (1969)

=== Notable translations into Finnish ===
- The Tall Book of Mother Goose (Hanhiemon iloinen lipas, 1954)
- Peter Christen Asbjørnsen: Skrinet med det rare i (Merkillinen lipas, 1955)
- Tove Jansson: Vem ska trösta knyttet? (Kuka lohduttaisi Nyytiä? 1960)
- Astrid Lindgren: Skrållan och sjörövarna (Saariston lapset merirosvoina, 1968)
- Lewis Carroll: Alice’s Adventures in Wonderland (Liisan seikkailut ihmemaassa, 1972, with Eeva-Liisa Manner)
- Maurice Sendak: In the Night Kitchen (Mikko maitomies, 1972)
- Lewis Carroll: Through the Looking-Glass (Liisan seikkailut peilimaailmassa, 1974, with Eeva-Liisa Manner)
- Federico García Lorca: Romancero gitano (Mustalaisromansseja, 1976)
