= J.O. Tallqvist =

Finnish journalist and editor (1910–1993)

Jarl Olof Henrik Tallqvist (17 January 1910 – 1 March 1993) was a Finnish journalist and editor. He was father to the architect and professor Tore Tallqvist.

Born in Helsinki, Tallqvist was the son of Gösta Tallqvist and Helmi Maria Haapanen. He graduated from Nya svenska läroverket in Helsinki in 1927. After that he studied humanities, with a focus on literary history and aesthetics, at the University of Helsinki and graduated with a Bachelor of Arts degree in 1934 and a Master of Arts degree in 1936.

He was an editor at Svenska Pressen 1934–1944, at Nya Pressen 1945–1952 and editorial secretary 1946–1947. He was press secretary at the Swedish People's Party of Finland 1952–1964 and cultural editor at Hufvudstadsbladet 1964–1975. He was a board member of the Suomen PEN-klubi 1947–1956, chairman of the Finnish Swedish Writers' Association 1956–1961 and chairman of the board there 1961–1967. He was a member of the State Literature Commission since 1974 and was chairman 1977–1979. Tallqvist also translated works from Finnish to Swedish.

Tallqvist was one of the foremost Swedish-speaking Finnish cultural journalists and critics of the 20th century. He made great contributions to Finnish-Swedish literature, both in Finland and in the Nordic countries.

Tallqvist married Marita Elisabeth Juslen in 1939. He died in Helsinki at the age of 83 in 1993.

== Bibliography ==
=== Translations (selection) ===
- Viborgs äterövring. Reportage i ord och bild från Karelska näsets befrielse. (1942)
- Puntila, L.A: Finlands politiska historia 1809—1955. (1964)
- Puntila, L.A: Finlands politiska historia 1809—1966. (1972)
- Matti Kurjensaari: Wulffska hörnet under 75 år. (Oy Wulff ab 1890—1965) (1965)
- Hundra år försäkringsverksamhet i Finland. Försäkringsbolaget Kaleva 1874—1974. (1979)
- Matti Kurjensaari: Berättelsen om Helsingfors. With Marita Tallqvist (1962)
- Helsingfors och dess människor. With Marita Tallqvist (1966)
- Matti Klinge: Blick på Finlands historia. With Marita Tallqvist (1977)
- Esa Santakari: Kansanrakentajien puukirkot. Allmogenästarnas träkyrkor. The wooden churches of Finland. With Tore Tallqvist (1977)
- Veijo Meri: Han som blev Aleksis Kivi. With Marita Tallqvist (1979)

=== As editor (selection) ===
- Finland för Norden. Uttalanden om vårt nordiska samarbete. (1944)
- Suomi kuuluu Pohjolaan. Lausuntoja pohjoismaisesta yhteistyöstämme. (1944)
- Vem och vad? Biografisk handbok. 1941. With H.R. Söderström (1941)
- Visor i fält. With Nils W. Lindholm (1943, 2. edition 1943)
- Press och publicister i svenska Finland. Matrikelkommitté: Henrik von Bondsdorff, Gunnar Strandell och J.O. Tallqvist. (1951)
