= Väinö Kunnas =

Finnish painter (1896–1929)

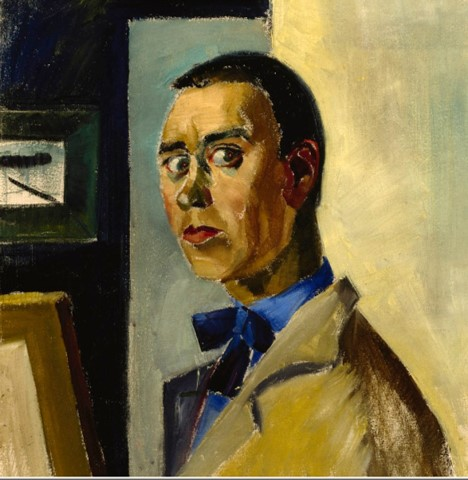
Self-portrait (1926)

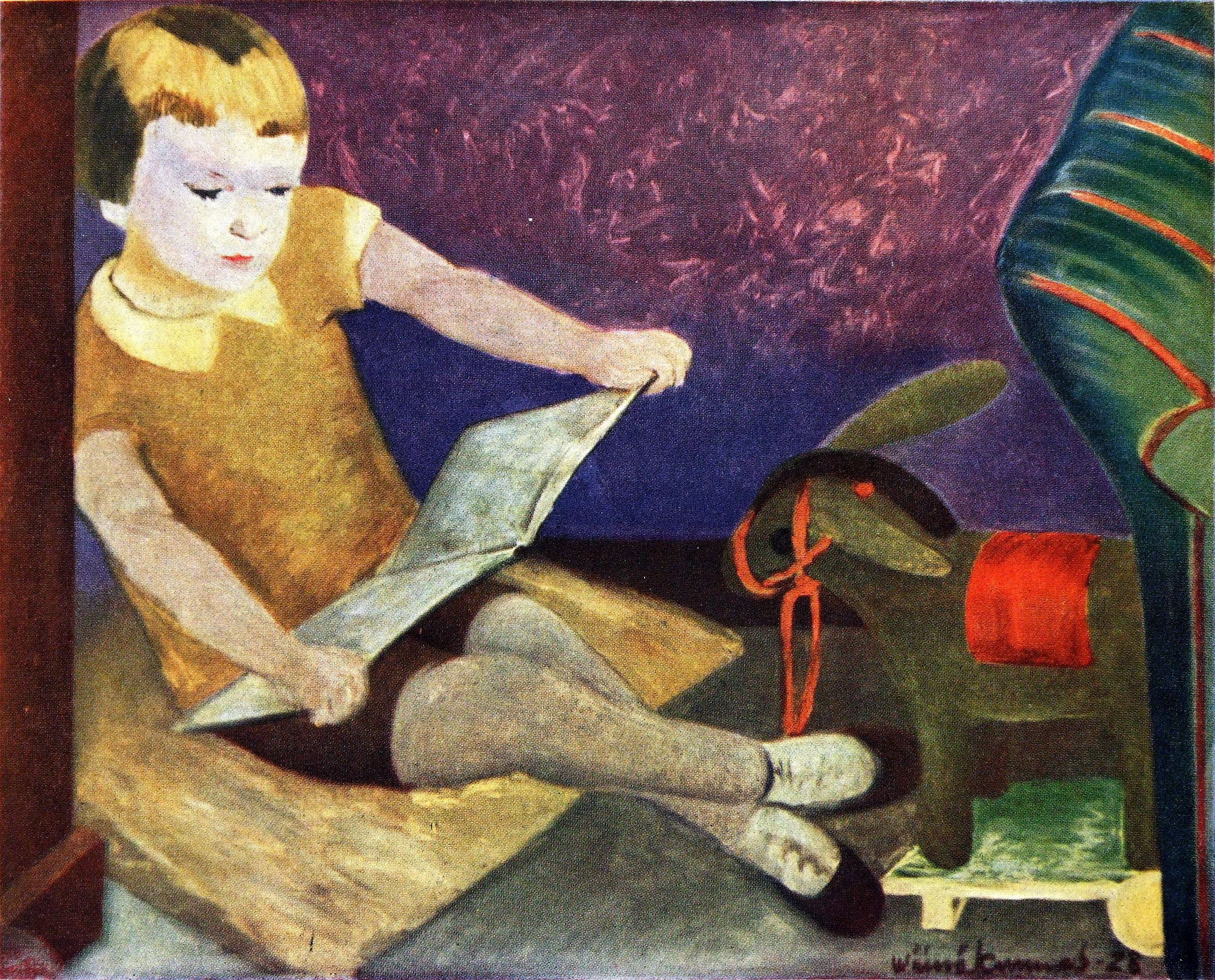
Kirsi's Fairy Tale Nook

Väinö Ilmari Kunnas (12 April 1896 in Vyborg – 10 February 1929 in Helsinki) was a Finnish Expressionist painter. During his brief career, he went from Expressionism to experiment with more abstract modern styles. His major works consist of portraits of cultural personalities and depictions of the urban environment.

== Life ==
His parents were the painters Mikko Kunnas (originally Keränen) and Helena Varonen. Due to his mother's early death, his education was interrupted. After the family moved to Sortavala, he was able to attend an arts and crafts school, graduating in 1912. When they returned home, he studied drawing at the Vyborg art school until 1917. He also studied music with the composer Toivo Kuula. In the 1918 Finnish Civil War, Kunnas fought for the Red Guards. After the Battle of Vyborg, he was captured by the Whites spending two weeks in a prison camp.

Kunnas moved to Helsinki in 1920, where he studied at the Finnish Art Society drawing school from 1920-1921. After graduating, his economic situation was rather precarious and he had to take full-time work as an assistant to the architect Johan Sigfrid Sirén. He began to exhibit during these years, and also became a member of the art association "Nuoret" (Youth) as well as Tulenkantajat, a literary-cultural society.

In 1924, he married the painter Sylvi Vehmas, and that year their daughter, Kirsi Kunnas, was born. She became a well-known poet and children's book author. Väinö Kunnas died of pneumonia in 1929.

== Works ==
- Maalaus Värtsilästä (View of Värtsilä), 1922
- Portrait of Uuno Kailas, 1924
- Portrait of Katri Vala, 1925
- Kaupunkikuva (Cityscape), 1926
- Omakuva (Self-portrait), 1926
- Tanssit-sarja (Dance Series), 1927–1928
- Portrait of Olavi Paavolainen, 1928
- Kirsin satunurkka (Kirsi's Fairy Tale Nook), 1928.
- Harmaa tanssi (The Grey Dance), 1928
