= Union of Finnish Writers =

The Union of Finnish Writers (Finnish: Suomen Kirjailijaliitto r.y.) is an ideological and professional organization representing fiction authors writing in Finnish. The organization was founded in 1897 and now has around 770 members. It is led by an elected board consisting of 8 members and 4 deputy members, chaired by author Ville Hytönen. The executive director is Ilmi Villacís. Jaakko Syrjä served as president from 1975 to 1980.

The Union's purpose is to develop and improve the conditions of writers' work as well as to promote Finnish literature.

To become a member of the Union an applicant must have published at least two independently created, original works of fiction written in Finnish. The works must be of an artistic and professional quality that allows the applicant to be considered a writer.

The Union of Finnish Writers is a founding member of the Finnish Reading Centre, which promotes reading and literacy, and the Sanasto Copyright Society. It cooperates with the Society of Swedish Authors in Finland, which is the Finland-Swedish writer's association.

The Union publishes the quarterly Kirjailija magazine.

== Notes ==
- https://yle.fi/uutiset/3-9349902
- http://www.kirjailijaliitto.fi/kirjailija-lehti/uusin-lehti/
