= Ulla Olin-Nilson =

Swedish author (1920–2009)

- Born: Ulla Helena Olin-Nilsson; August 10, 1920; Tenala, Finland
- Died: February 26, 2009 (aged 88); Nässjö, Sweden
- Occupations: Author, poet, folk high school teacher

Ulla Olin-Nilson (Ulla Helena Olin-Nilsson; August 10, 1920 – February 26, 2009) was a Swedish author, poet, and folk high school teacher.

== Biography ==
Ulla Olin-Nilson was born on August 10, 1920, in Tenala, Finland. She grew up on a farm in the village of Tenala in southern Finland and graduated from Zilliacuska School in Finland. She obtained a Bachelor of Arts degree from the University of Helsinki in 1944. Her teachers included well-known authors such as Arvid Mörne, Emil Zilliacus, and Hans Ruin. Her master's thesis was on Arvid Mörne. After postgraduate studies in Nordic languages at Lund University (1946–1947), she was employed at Schildts förlag in Helsinki. There she worked with writers such as Hagar Olsson and Elmer Diktonius. In 1948, she married the folk high school teacher Nils G Nilson and the couple settled in Nässjö. There, she worked as a teacher at Sörängens folk high school for 35 years (1949–1985) where her husband was the rector. During the 1960s and 1970s, she worked as a poetry reviewer for Hufvudstadsbladet.

Ulla Olin published a number of poetry collections but did not achieve recognition until 1986 and 1990 with the collections Vintertvätt and Eftervärme. She published her last poetry collection, Oförklarligt lysande, in 2002.

She held writing courses in Nässjö and also initiated the annual poetry festival there in 1987.

She was the chairperson of the Nässjö Art Association and the Smålands Writers' Society, where she also served as an anthology editor. In 1993, she was elected to the Småland Academy.

Ulla Olin owned an extensive collection of original editions of Finland-Swedish poetry, which she donated to Eksjö City Library.

== Career ==
Ulla Olin made her debut as a 19-year-old with the poetry collection Vårbrytning in 1939. Over the following years, she published two more poetry collections (Verklighetens idyller in 1941, and Mörk ligger jorden in 1943) which were characterized by the strains of war. During her years of study, Olin came into contact with and was inspired by the Finnish modernists Rabbe Enckell and Gunnar Björling. Havsfärd in 1949 marked a first breakthrough and was positively reviewed by Gunnar Björling. With sparse intervals, a few more poetry collections were published until the Swedish breakthrough with Vintertvätt in 1986 and Eftervärme in 1990. The poems often originated from the everyday living environment. Ulla Olin's interest in art also became evident; several poems are descriptions of artworks, "still lifes in words". Her husband's illness and death in 1988 left deep marks on her poetry. A serious traffic accident resulted in lasting consequences, and the experiences were depicted, among other things, in Dröm om viktlöshet in 1999.

In addition to poetry, Ulla Olin published a collection of letters between her grandparents Olga and Robert Rostedt (founder and rector of Finns folk high school in Esbo) and between Olga and Ida Nyström, Ulla Olin's aunt.

== Bibliography ==
- 1939 – Vårbrytning
- 1941 – Verklighetens idyller
- 1943 – Mörk ligger jorden
- 1949 – Havsfärd
- 1959 – Dagövning
- 1962 – Mötesplats
- 1972 – De levandes mod
- 1986 – Vintertvätt
- 1987 – Medicinkopparnas förvandling
- 1987 - Representerad i antologin Modern finlandssvensk lyrik, redigerad av Claes Andersson och Bo Carpelan.
- 1988 – Inte nu men nu
- 1989 – Valda dikter
- 1990 – Eftervärme
- 1991 – Olga och Robert Rostedt: två folkhögskoleöden.
- 1992 – Solen installerad
- 1993 – Närmare dikt, till dig
- 1995 – Försök till testamente
- 1999 – Dröm om viktlöshet
- 2002 – Oförklarligt lysande
- 2003 – Vid en isrand
