= Quosego =

Finnish avant-garde magazine (1928–1929)

- Editor: Cid Erik Tallqvist
- Categories: Avant-garde magazine
- Publisher: Söderströms
- Founder: Elmer Diktonius
- Founded: 1928
- First issue: 28 May 1928
- Final issue: April 1929
- Country: Finland
- Based in: Helsinki
- Language: Swedish

Quosego was an Finland-Swedish avant-garde magazine which existed between 1928 and 1929 in Helsingfors (Helsinki), Finland. Like its successor Ultra, it played a significant role in introducing the avant-garde movement to Nordic countries. However, Quosego was much more influential than its successor in terms of artistic and linguistic innovation. The subtitle of Quosego was Tidskrift för ny generation (Swedish: Journal for the New Generation).

== History and profile ==
The preparations to launch Quosego began in Paris in 1926 by a group, including Elmer Diktonius, Hjalmar Hagelstam, Yngve Bäck and Torger Enckell. The first issue was published on 28 May 1928 by the Helsinki-based Söderströms, with Cid Erik Tallqvist as the editor-in-chief. Its contributors were mostly Finland-Swedish expressionist and dadaist artists and writers, such as Hagar Olsson and Olof Enckell. The latter presented the reactions of the young Finland-Swedish poets about the work by Vilhelm Ekelund. The magazine frequently featured poems by Gunnar Björling as well as Swedish translations of those by Eino Leino. Björling published his experimental poems in all issues of Quosego.

Quosego ceased publication in April 1929 after producing four issues.

== See also ==
- List of avant-garde magazines
