= Nicken Malmström =

Finnish writer and mycologist (1897–1967)

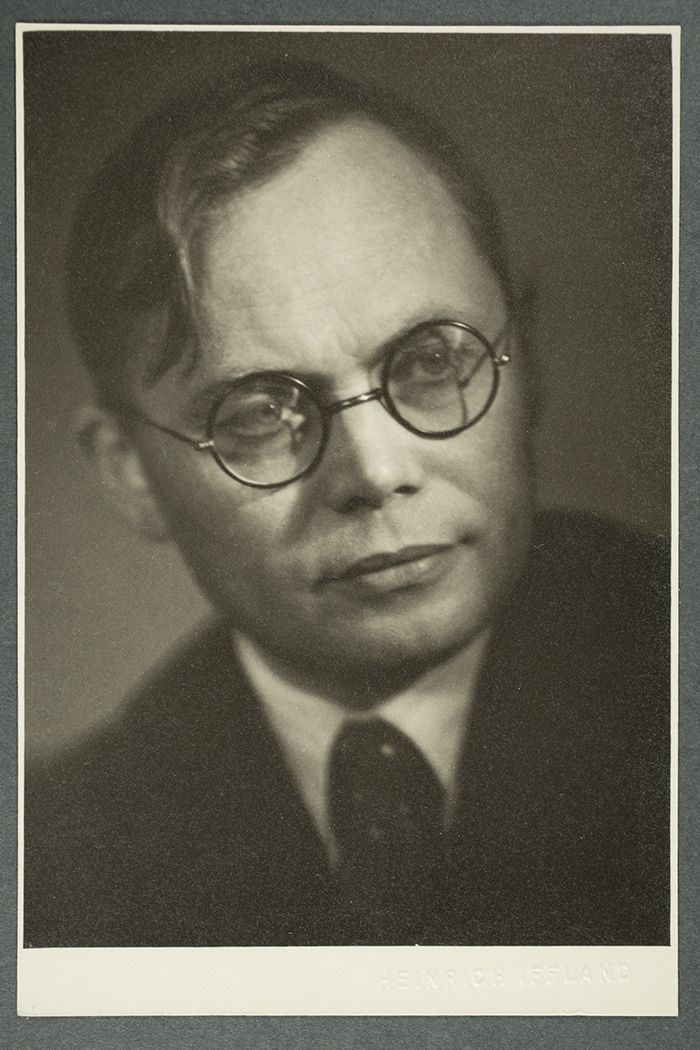
- Born: February 19, 1897; Moscow, Russia
- Died: July 26, 1967 (aged 70); Helsinki, Finland
- Occupations: Author, Mycologist
- Spouse: Ann-Marie Häyrén-Malmström

Nicken Malmström (19 February 1897 – 26 July 1967) was a Finnish author who wrote in Swedish, and a mycologist.

== Personal history ==
Malmström was the son of precision mechanic Karl Teodor Malmström and Tatjana Malmström. He graduated from secondary school in 1917, completed his primary school teacher's examination in 1921, and obtained his Bachelor of Arts degree in 1926 and Master of Arts degree in 1927.

Malmström worked as a mother tongue teacher in Helsinki from 1934 to 1939 and as a mycologist at the Department of Botany at the University of Helsinki from 1949 to 1964. Malmström's spouse from 1930 to 1947 was the visual artist Ann-Marie Häyrén-Malmström.

== Literature ==
As a poet, Malmström was a pessimistic modernist of the 1930s generation, but he also published aphorisms and a short story collection. After his debut in 1927, Malmström published about ten poetry collections, which initially bore the mark of fatalism and disharmony—moods that were later replaced by a trusting religious outlook on life.

Malmström's works were reviewed by prominent contemporary critics and authors such as Elmer Diktonius, Hagar Olsson, Rabbe Enckell, Mirjam Tuominen, and Bo Carpelan.

== Publications ==
- I stoftet, poetry collection. Schildt, Helsinki 1927
- Med långhårigt huvud. Söderström, Helsinki 1929
- Ur nattens hand, poetry collection. Söderström, Helsinki 1935
- Under solen. Söderström, Helsinki 1939
- Vid skymningens fönsterpost. Söderström, Helsinki 1945
- Mot morgonportar, poetry collection. Söderström, Helsinki 1946
- På gränsen, short stories. Söderström, Helsinki 1950
- Du som kommer, poetry collection. Söderström, Helsinki 1951
- Fågelvägen, aphorisms. Söderström, Helsinki 1953
- Gryning och obelisk, poetry collection. Söderström, Helsinki 1957
- Jordstjärna, poetry collection. Söderström, Helsinki 1962
- Aldrig en strand: valda dikter 1927–39, selected poems. Söderström, Helsinki 1963
