= Ultra (magazine) =

Finnish avant-garde magazine (1922)

- Categories: Avant-garde magazine
- Publisher: Daimon
- Founder: Elmer Diktonius
- Founded: 1922
- First issue: September 1922
- Final issue: December 1922
- Country: Finland
- Based in: Helsinki
- Language: Finnish; Swedish
- OCLC: 828891243

Ultra was a Finnish and Finland-Swedish avant-garde bilingual art and literature magazine which appeared in Finland in 1922. Its subtitle was tidskrift för ny konst och litteratur (Swedish: Magazine for New Art and Literature). Although it produced only eight issues, it played a significant role in the introduction of avant-garde literary approach in the region.

== History and profile ==
Ultra was launched by Elmer Diktonius in September 1922. It was published by a small company named Daimon and was edited by Hagar Olsson. The company was founded and run by the Finnisg poet L. A. Salava. In the first four issue Raul af Hällström also served as the editor. The magazine had a Finnish edition which was edited by Lauri Haarla and a Swedish edition. In fact, Finnish-language material was dominant in the magazine which contained two-thirds of its content. It featured essays on literature, music, theater, art, and poetry. Major contributors included Eino Palola, Edith Södergran, Ormi Arp, Gunnar Björling, Rabbe Enckell, Uuno Kailas, Viljo Kojo, Katri Vala, and artist Uuno Eskola. Elmer Diktonius also published articles in Ultra criticizing nationalist and narrow approaches in modern poetry. To this end he tried to develop collaborations with international writers for the magazine, but his efforts were not fruitful.

The magazine ceased publication in December 1922 following its eighth issue. Ultra was succeeded by Quosego magazine which existed between 1928 and 1929.

== See also ==
- List of avant-garde magazines
