= Zinaida Lindén =

Russian-Finnish writer

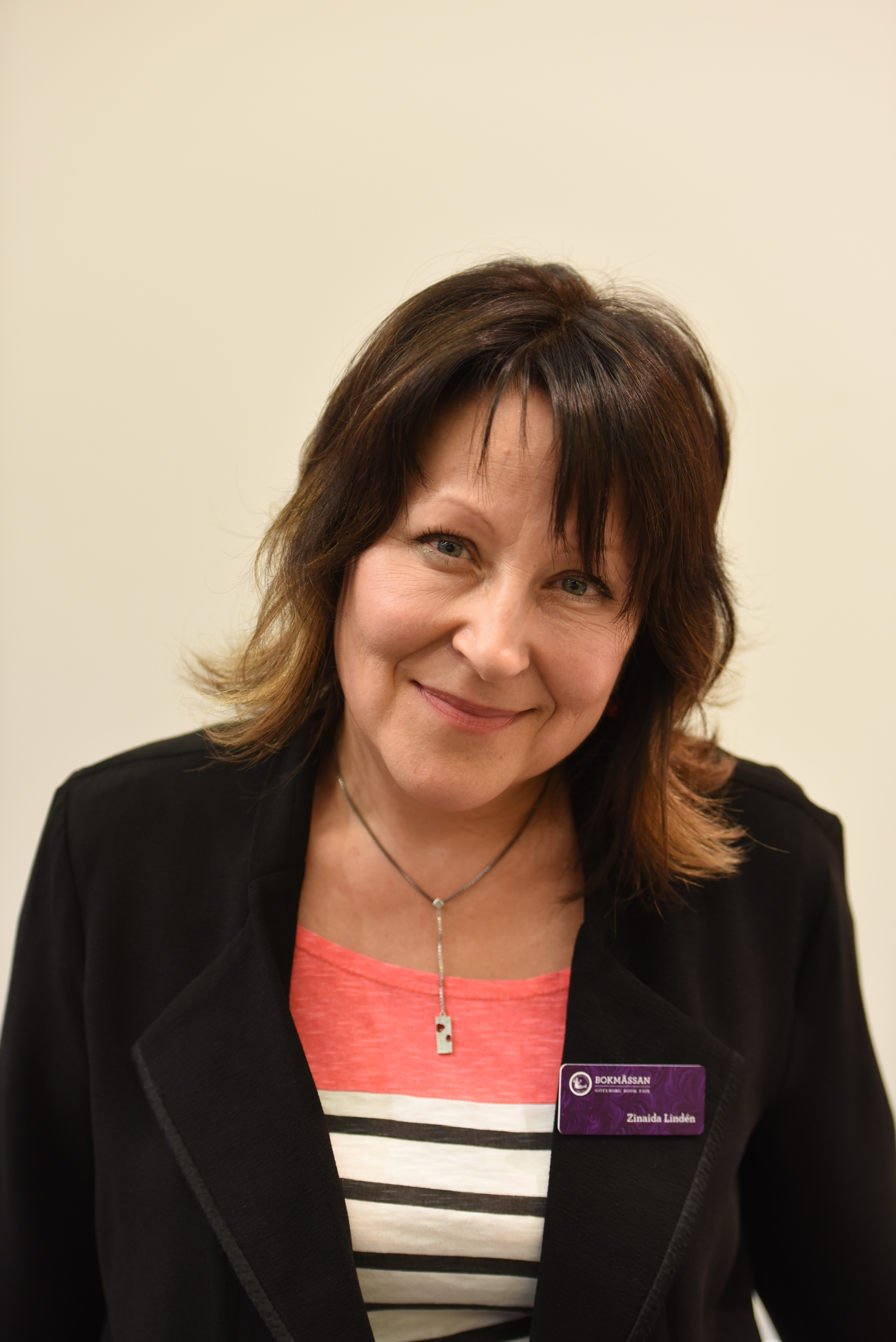
- Born: Zinaida Vladimirovna Ushakova; 29 December 1963 (age 62); Leningrad, Soviet Union
- Occupation: Writer

Zinaida Lindén (born 29 December 1963) is a Russian and Finland-Swedish writer, who lives in Finland. She is a publicist and author of short stories and several novels. She writes in Swedish and Russian. She was a laureate of the Runeberg Prize (2005).

== Biography ==
Lindén was born as Zinaida Vladimirovna Ushakova (Russian: Зинаида Владимировна Ушакова) on 29 December 1963 in Leningrad. In 1986 she graduated from the Philological Faculty of Leningrad University, where she received a diploma in Swedish Language and Literature. She worked as a guide, translator, studied the works of Andrei Tarkovsky and Ingmar Bergman at the Leningrad Institute of Theater, Music and Cinema.

In 1990 Lindén married a Finnish citizen, a physicist; in 1991 she moved to Finland. From 1991 to 1995 she lived in the capital region, and since 1995 she has been living with her family in Turku. She spends a lot of time in St. Petersburg. She has close ties with Japan, where she lived from 1999 to 2000, and which she has visited several times afterwards.

Lindén has two children.

== Bibliography ==
- 1996 – Överstinnan och syntetisatorn (Söderströms, ISBN 951-52-1633-8)
- 2000 – Scheherazades sanna historier (Söderströms, ISBN 951-52-1854-3)
- 2004 – I väntan på en jordbävning (Söderströms, ISBN 951-52-2187-0, Atlantis, ISBN 91-7353-027-1)
- 2007 – Takakirves – Tokyo (Söderströms, ISBN 978-951-52-2464-4)
- 2009 – Lindanserskan (Söderströms ISBN 978-951-52-2612-9)
- 2013 – För många länder sedan (Schildts & Söderströms, ISBN 9789515232052)
- 2016 – Valenciana (Schildts & Söderströms ISBN 9789515238009)
- 2022 – Till min syster bortom haven (Scriptum ISBN 9789527523032)
