= Edith Södergran =

Finnish poet (1892–1923)

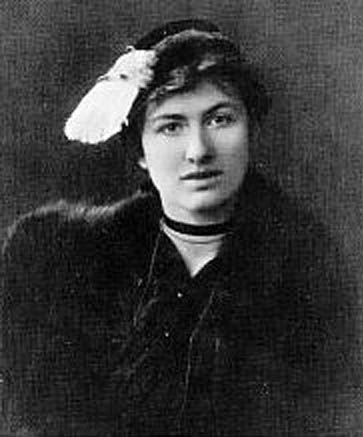
- Edith Södergran in 1917
- Born: 4 April 1892; Saint Petersburg, Russian Empire
- Died: 24 June 1923 (aged 31); Raivola, Finland (present-day Roshchino, Russia)
- Resting place: Raivola
- Education: Petrischule; Saint Peter's School
- Writing career
- Language: Swedish
- Genre: Poetry
- Literary movement: Symbolist poetry; futurism

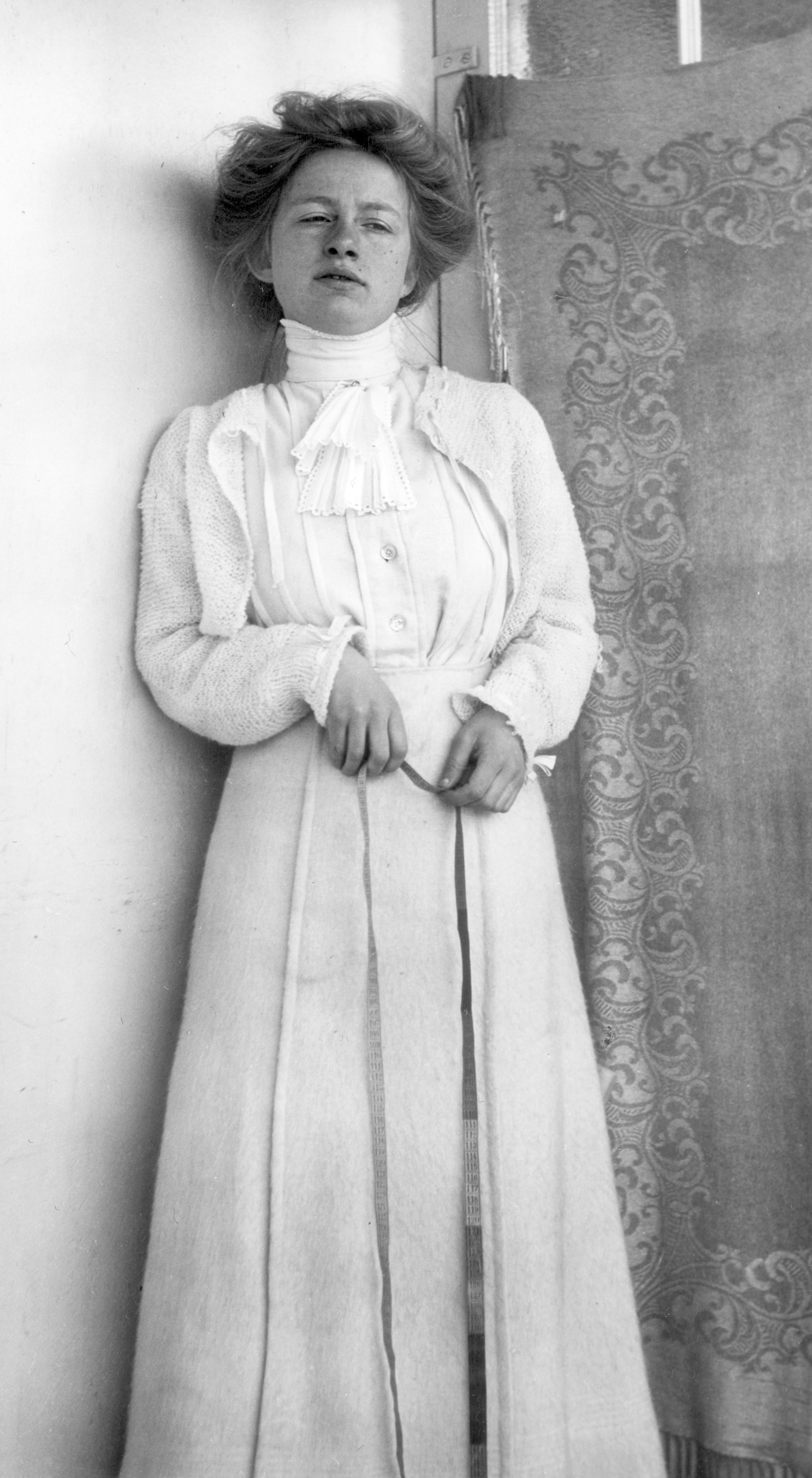
Edith Södergran, self-portrait.

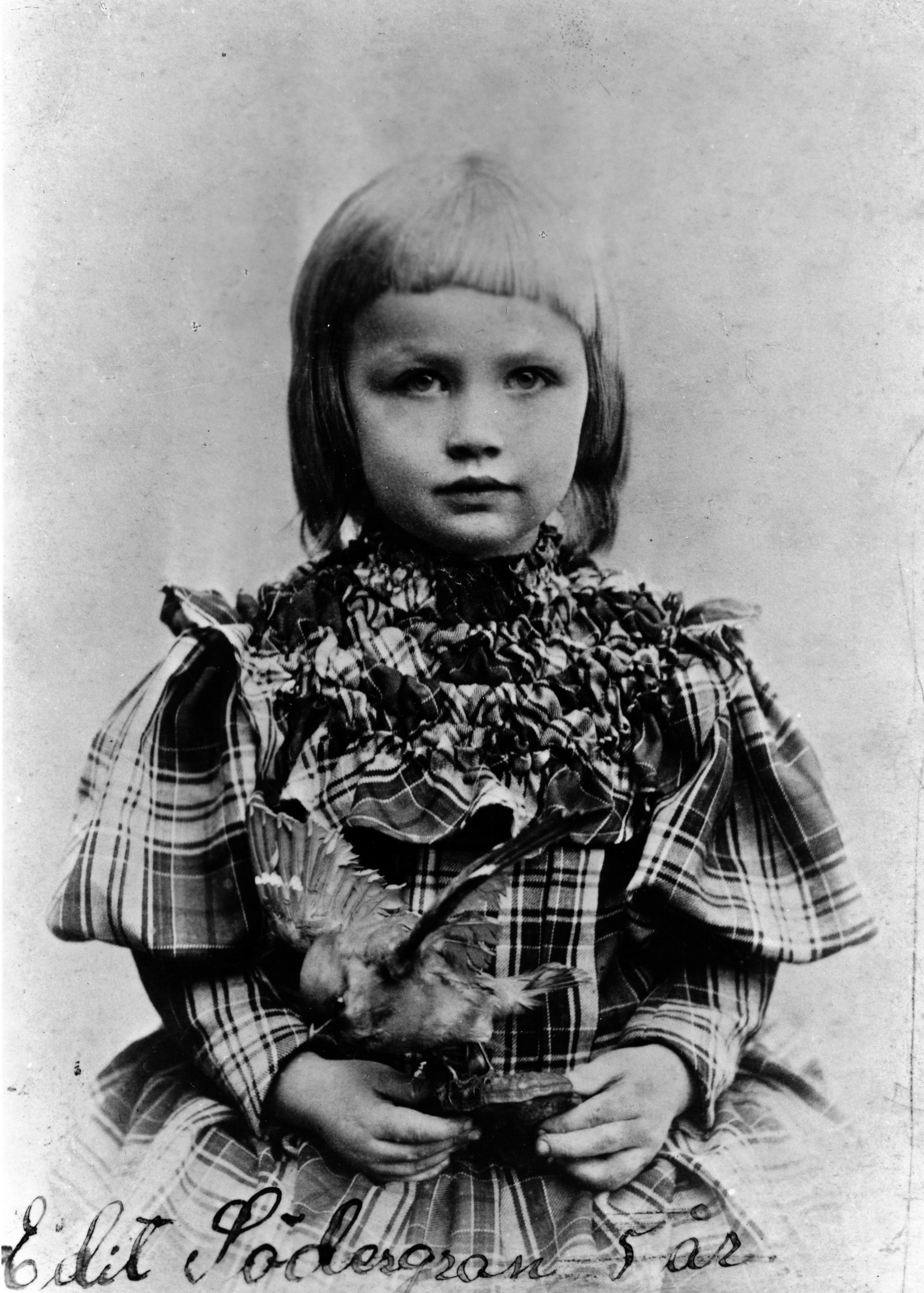
Edith Södergran, 5 years old.

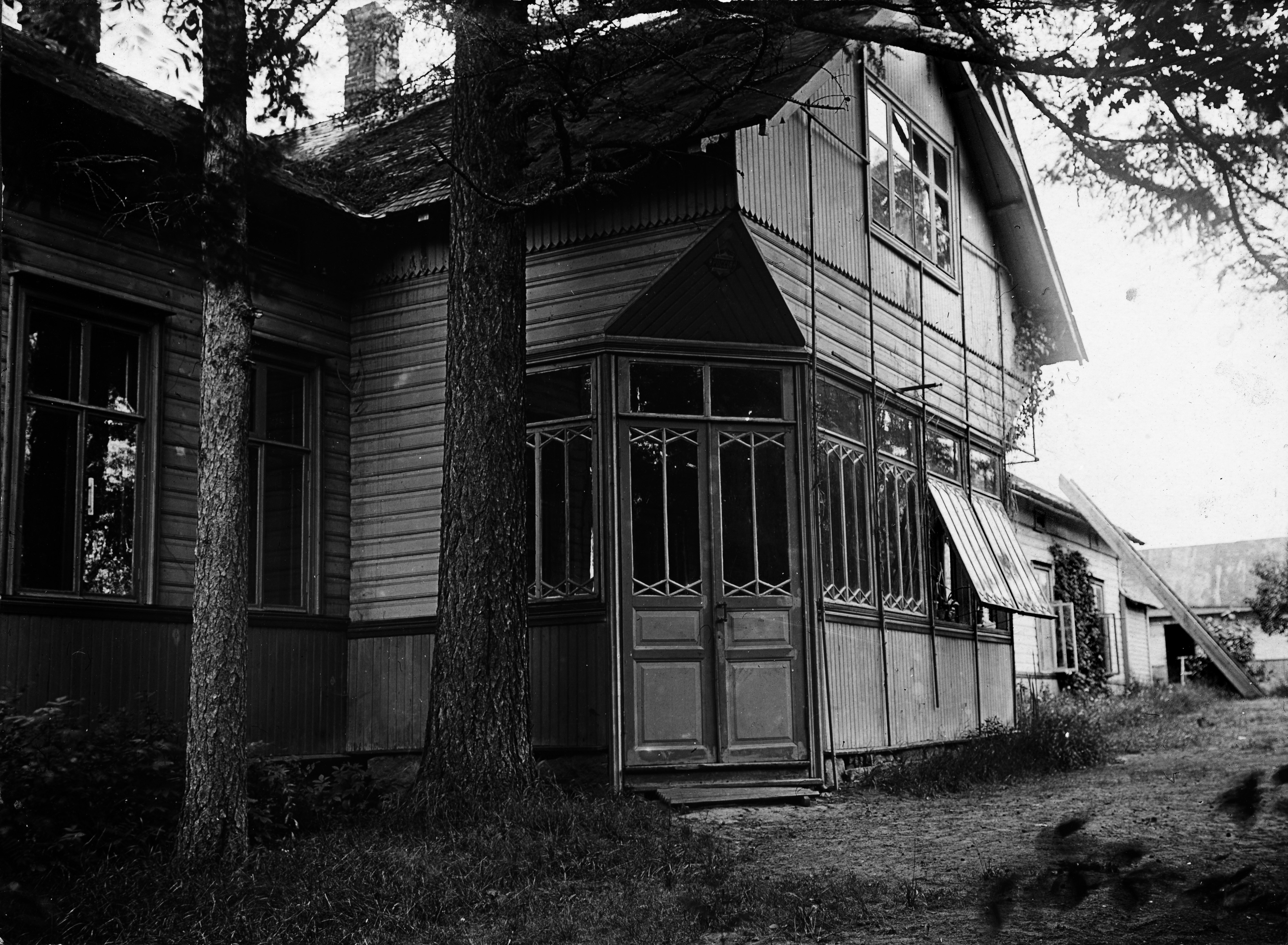
Edith Södergran childhood home at Raivola.

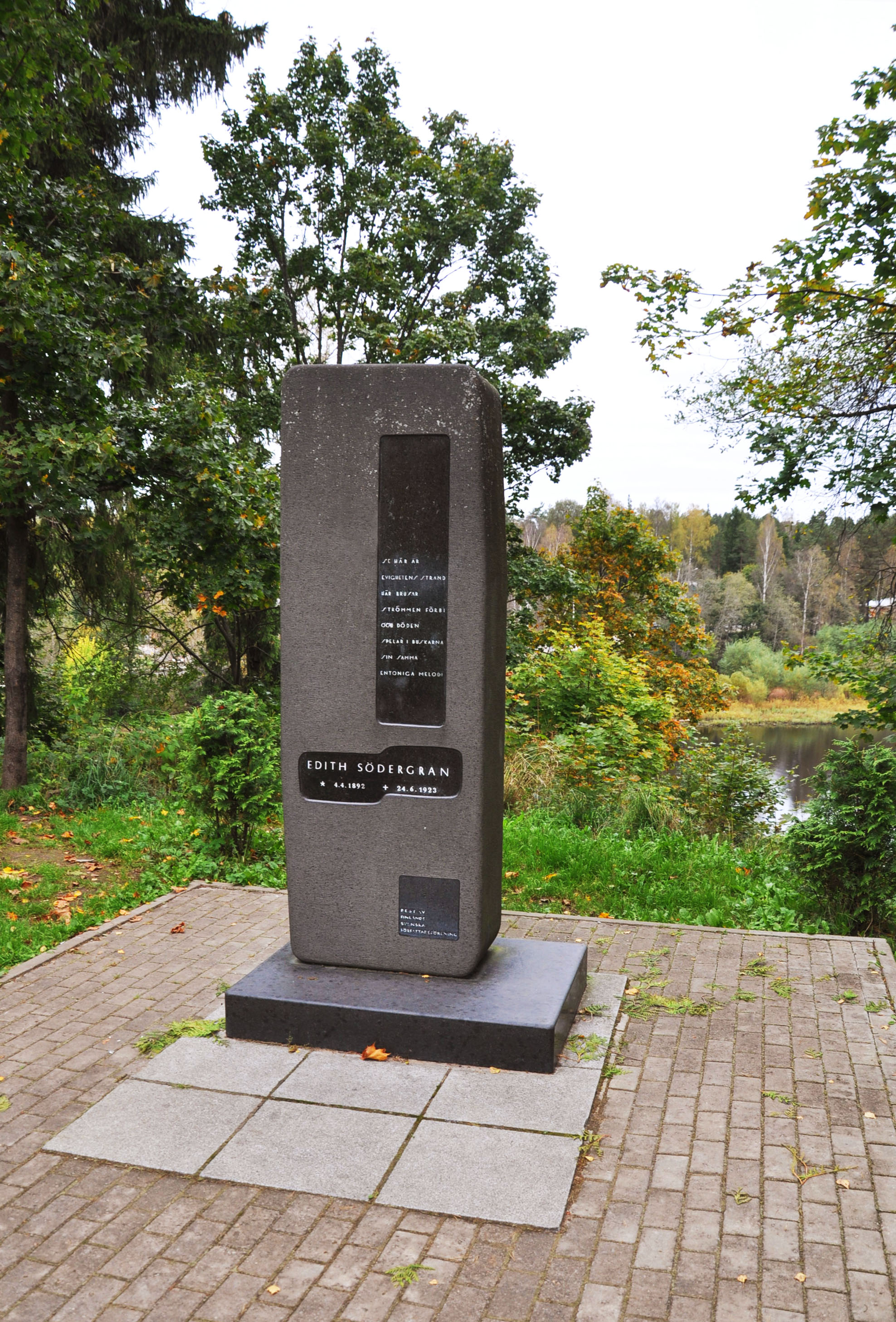
Edith Södergran's memorial stone erected 1960 in Raivola.

Edith Irene Södergran (4 April 1892 – 24 June 1923) was a Swedish-speaking Finnish poet. One of the first modernists within Swedish-language literature, her influences came from French Symbolism, German expressionism, and Russian futurism. She was fluent in French, English and Russian. At the age of 24 she released her first collection of poetry entitled Dikter ("Poems"). Södergran died at the age of 31, having contracted tuberculosis as a teenager. She did not live to experience the worldwide appreciation of her poetry, which has influenced many lyrical poets. Södergran is considered to have been one of the greatest modern Swedish-language poets, and her work continues to influence Swedish-language poetry and musical lyrics, for example, in the works of Mare Kandre, Gunnar Harding, Eva Runefelt, Heidi Sundblad-Halme, and Eva Dahlgren.

== Childhood ==
Edith Irene Södergran was born in Saint Petersburg, Russia, into a middle-class Swedish speaking family. Her father, Mats Södergran hailed from Ostrobothnia while her mother, Helena Södergran, née Holmroos, was born and raised in Saint Petersburg. Edith grew up as an only child. Her mother had earlier become pregnant by a Russian soldier and given birth to an illegitimate son, but the child died after only two days. Her father had been a widower after the death of his wife and two small children. The sorrow united her parents, who were also both considered less suitable in marriage due to their past.

Edith's mother came from a well-positioned family, and the status of women within the family is thought to have been strong. It is apparent that Edith and her mother shared a strong bond. Considerably less is known about her relationship to her father, who died when Edith was only 15.

When Edith was just a few months old, the Södergran family moved to the village of Raivola on the Karelian Isthmus where her grandfather, Gabriel Holmroos, bought a house for them. A short time afterward, Mats acquired a job as a superintendent at a sawmill. Three years later, the company went into bankruptcy, and the family struggled to make ends meet. Helena's father died a few months later, and the inheritance was shared between her and her mother. With the money from the inheritance, Helena was able to pay the family's debts and get them back on their feet. The rest of the money disappeared quickly, however, due to Mats' unsuccessful businesses. Helena managed to arrange for the family to receive a part of the proceeds from her mother's share of the inheritance, making the family debt-free once more.

Edith attended the girls school at Petrischule in St. Petersburg. Petrischule was rich in tradition and created an interesting and highly intellectual surrounding for Edith. The school was situated opposite The Winter Palace, which enabled Edith to experience the troubles in Tsarist Russia at close range. She was almost certainly in the city on Bloody Sunday in January 1905 when the Tsarist guards opened fire on thousands of starving citizens who had gathered to protest the lack of food.

In 1904, her father was diagnosed with tuberculosis, and in May 1906 he was admitted to Nummela sanatorium in Uusimaa. He was later sent home, incurably ill. Mats Södergran died in October 1907, only a year before Edith would herself be diagnosed with the disease.

Under these complicated circumstances, Edith's mother was responsible for the well-being of the family, especially as Mats Södergran's health deteriorated. This is believed to have been an early influence on Edith's belief in women and feminism. Though her first real encounter with a more structured questioning of the gender dynamics and the 'new woman' is believed to have taken place during her time in a sanatorium in Switzerland.

Edith was a keen photographer, and there are many pictures of her mother, albeit few of her father. Helena Södergran was a robust, petite and intelligent woman with a broad and captivating smile. Helena may have seemed stable, but was often nervous, shaken and restless. Edith enjoyed a close bond with her mother, and Helena supported her daughter's wish to become a poet. Edith and her mother spent a lot more time together than Edith and her father. Edith and Helena would move into St. Petersburg during the school terms, living in the Wiborgska part of the city. Edith's father only lived with them in the city for short periods of time.

Edith had made a few friends, but Helena feared her daughter might be lonely. Some biographers, including Gunnar Tideström, have claimed that Helena had found a foster sister of a similar age to Edith, named Singa. Singa is believed to have lived with the Södergrans during school terms, but moved back to her biological family during the holidays. On one visit, Singa supposedly ran away back to her biological family, but while walking along the train tracks she was run over by a train, and Helena later found the mutilated body. However, other biographers, such as Ebba Witt-Brattström, have disputed the story of Singa, claiming there is no real evidence she ever existed.

== School days ==
In 1902, Edith began her schooling in Die deutsche Hauptschule zu St. Petri (Russian: Петришуле) where she studied until 1909. These school years were characterized by worries and strong social tensions which likely affected her worldview. Amongst the poems in Vaxdukshäftet that depict Edith's school years, there are poems with political themes. At school there were pupils of many nationalities, including German, Russian, Finnish and Scandinavian. Her studies focused on modern languages, and she learned German, French, English and Russian; however, she received no instruction in her mother tongue of Swedish, and her knowledge of Swedish grammar and spelling was somewhat faltering. German was the language she spoke most both in school and with her friends. It was in German that she wrote her first poems. She improved her German during her stay in Davos, Switzerland as a patient during 1912-1913 and from 1913 to 1914 for the second time.

Edith was an intelligent pupil with the ability to assimilate knowledge quickly, needing to spend little time revising. One of her classmates described her as the class' most gifted pupil. More and more she became interested in the French lessons she received. To a certain extent, this was due to her teacher, Henri Cottier, to whom she directed a large proportion of the love poems that appear in Vaxdukshäftet.

During 1908, Edith appears to have made a decision to make Swedish the main language of her writings and her poems in German suddenly stopped. This was not a self-evident decision. She had no close contact with Swedish literature, and Finland-Swedish poetry was in a depression. An important impulse to the decision might have come from one of her relatives, the Finland-Swedish language researcher Hugo Bergroth. Some years earlier she had published a poem, Hoppet ("The Hope"), in a membership newsletter for the Swedish Liberal Party in Helsingfors and began to come into contact with Finland-Swedish authors. The transition to Swedish seemed also to mark a clear decision to focus on poetry.

== Illness ==
One day in November 1908, Edith came home from school saying that she was restless and that she did not feel well. Helena called for a doctor, who diagnosed that Edith had an inflammation of the lungs. According to the mother, the girl understood what it was as she asked several times if she had got "lung soot". Edith had guessed correctly. On New Year's Day 1909, it was established and Edith tested positive for tuberculosis. Barely a month after the result, she was admitted to Nummela sanatorium, the same hospital where her father had been a patient before he passed on, meaning that Edith was never entirely comfortable there. At the time, the chances of recovering entirely from tuberculosis were not especially good. 70–80% of cases died within ten years of diagnosis.

Edith was unhappy at Nummela. The place was altogether too strongly associated with her father's death. She lost weight, her mood was low, and she was described afterwards as unkempt and "strange". She was even thought to have a mild mental illness after she proposed to one of the doctors. It is apparent that she did not get on well at Nummela and felt that the place resembled more closely a prison. During the long days, Edith daydreamed of other lands and exotic places. She willingly shared her dreams, which made her seem even more peculiar. During the following year, her condition worsened, and the family looked for help abroad. The obvious choice was Switzerland, which was at the time the centre for tuberculosis treatment within Europe.

At the beginning of October 1911, roughly three years after the start of her illness, Edith and her mother travelled to Arosa in Switzerland, but even there she did not get on especially well. She was examined by three doctors who all came up with entirely different solutions to her illness. Some months later, she was transported to Dr Ludwig von Muralt at the Davos-Dorf sanatorium. Edith immediately took a liking to her new doctor and got on much better there. Dr von Muralt suggested that a so-called left-sided pneumothorax should be performed. This involved puncturing the lung during an operation and filling it with nitrogen gas. The punctured lung would be unusable but it would be "rested". After May 1912 no more tuberculosis bacteria were shown to be in her lungs although she was not free from the sickness and knew that she must be watchful of her diet and rest for several hours every day.

Her time in Switzerland played a large role in Edith's international orientation. From a remote part of Finland she had arrived in an intellectually vital country where, not least at the sanatorium, she met many gifted people from the whole of Europe. With them she felt a connection that she had rarely felt in St. Petersburg. Thomas Mann's novel The Magic Mountain, which admittedly was written after the war but is set in a sanatorium during these years, gives a picture of the intellectually lively atmosphere. Her doctor, von Muralt, appears also to be one of the first doctors who truly won her trust and friendship. When he died in 1917, Edith wrote two poems, Trädet i skogen ("The Tree in the Forest") and Fragment av en stämning ("Fragment of a Mood"), which expresses her sorrow and conflicted memories of her time in Switzerland.

Finally, Edith felt better, her cough had disappeared, and she was perkier than normal. In the spring of 1914 she finally travelled home, but the sickness shadowed her and her poetry faced a struggle against illness and, later, fatigue.

== Literary revolt ==
Her debut book Dikter ("Poems"), which came out in the autumn of 1916, gained no great notice, even if a few critics were slightly perplexed – Södergran was already using associative free verse and describing selected details instead of entire landscapes. Expression of a young, modern, female consciousness in poems like Dagen svalnar... ("The Day Cools...") and Vierge moderne ("Modern Lady") was entirely new within Swedish language poetry.

After the October Revolution in 1917, Edith and her mother's economic assets were suddenly rendered worthless since they had been placed in Ukrainian securities; and soon after, from the spring of 1918, the Karelian Isthmus became a war zone. In Petrograd (as St. Petersburg was called from 1914), people were being shot without trial, and Södergran knew that several of her classmates had fled from the city. She read Friedrich Nietzsche and found in him the courage to keep upright against a periodically shifting and degrading life.

Her new poetic direction with Septemberlyran ("The September Lyre") met no greater understanding from the public and from critics. She tried to discuss her poetry in a notorious letter to the editor in the Helsinki newspaper Dagens Press on New Year's Eve 1918 in order to clear up some of her intentions with the paradoxical visions in her new book. She succeeded instead in provoking the first debate about modernism's incomprehensible poetry in the Swedish language – a debate which would later return regarding Birger Sjöberg, Peter Weiss and Erik Lindegren. The newspaper debate in Södergran's case was harsh – none of the debaters seemed either to have had any sense of the conditions under which the poems had been written: hunger, tuberculosis, the threat of being exiled or killed if Raivola was taken by the Red Guard – but she won a friend and lifelong ally in the young critic Hagar Olsson (1893–1978).

Olsson became a first breach in her isolated and threatened existence in the distant village – she made a number of visits, and the two women remained in contact by letter until a few weeks before Södergran's death, when Olsson went on a tour to France without an inkling that she was to lose one of her best friends. She was to grow into one of the most powerful modernist critics in Finland, and at times she has been seen as almost a posthumous spokeswoman and interpreter of Södergran, not least because so few others had been in continuous and close long-term contact with the poet and were still alive and willing to speak in public when Södergran became an established classic. It was a position with which Olsson was, by her own admission, uncomfortable, but her accounts of Södergran and her edition of the author's letters to her, with Olsson's own evocative commentary (her own letters were lost after Södergran's death), have had an incalculable effect on the later image of her friend.

In the next book, Rosenaltaret ("The Rose Altar"), printed in June 1919, a cycle of poems, Fantastique celebrates the sister, a being who seems to hover between reality and fantasy in some of the poems while some of the details are quite close to subjects that had been discussed in the letters of the two. The poem Systern ("The Sister") is silently dedicated to Olsson, and contains the line "She got lost to me in the throng of the city" which, as biographer Gunnar Tideström has put it, corresponds to Södergran's dismay after the too-short visits by Hagar Olsson and her return to Helsingfors. Olsson has later recalled Södergran's lyrical, funny, warm, and sometimes frightening and imposing personality. Both of them have sometimes been seen as bisexuals, and the question of whether there was a lesbian element in the emotional bond between them remains a disputed one.

With the next collection of poems, Framtidens skugga ("The Shadow of the Future") (whose original title was "Köttets mysterier" ("Mysteries of the Flesh")), the visions that had exhorted Södergran culminate in poems speaking of a renewed world after the wars and catastrophes that now ravage the Earth – Raivola was, as stated earlier, a war zone in 1918, and even later Edith was able to hear gunfire from her kitchen window. The wording can lead one to think both of Walt Whitman and Jim Morrison when the poet takes on the role of fortune teller, general, or quite simply that of Eros' chosen intermediary, as in the poem Eros hemlighet ("Eros' secret").

Despite the visionary overtones, Södergran was during this period an atheist, and according to neighbours and friends she was entirely capable of differentiating between her own self and the shimmering queens and prophets she took as characters in her poetry. The change imagined in her writing would create a new humanity, led by "the strongest spirits" (Nietzsche's Übermenschen); see, for example, the poems Botgörarne ("The Atoners") and Först vill jag bestiga Chimborazzo ("First I shall ascend Chimborazzo in my own land"). Generally, when she gave space for a more positive belief in nature and religious spirituality in her poems, it meant that she felt a release from some of the specific expectations that had upheld her in a dreary existence – a waiting and "charging-up" that could not be endured indefinitely – but also an incipient repudiation of, and retreat from, her Nietzschean vision of the future.

From the summer of 1920 on, she abandoned her poetry until August 1922; during the autumn and winter she wrote her final poems, stimulated by the review Ultra; the short-lived review, started by Elmer Diktonius, Hagar Olsson and other young writers, was the first publication in Finland to embrace literary modernism, and it hailed Edith as a pioneering genius and printed her new poems. Left behind were the expectations of a leading role for herself but not the daring descriptive language, and some of these final poems have come to be her most-loved.

Edith died on Midsummer Day 1923 at her home in Raivola, and was buried at the village church. Her mother continued to live in the village until 1939 and died during the evacuation that occurred due to the winter war. Following The Moscow Peace Treaty in 1940, the village became Soviet territory and to this day belongs to Russia (the area has become urbanized since 1950 and most visible traces of the village that existed in Södergran's day are now long gone). The site of Edith's grave is today unknown; however, in 1960 a statue to her was erected in Raivola. Shortly after the war, Raivola was renamed Roschino (Russian: Рощино). Of her former home, only the ground stones remain. They are situated behind the Orthodox church, which after the Fall of the Soviet Union was rebuilt in the same place using photographs of her house as a guide.

== Work and aesthetic position ==
Edith Södergran was a trailblazer within modernist Swedish poetry and had many followers, including, amongst others, Elmer Diktonius (1896–1961), Gunnar Björling (1887–1960) and Rabbe Enckell (1903–74). In Sweden she became an important guide for a number of poets, including Gunnar Ekelöf and Karin Boye, and her poems are now translated into Russian, Spanish, Chinese and other languages.

It took many years for her to gain recognition. Fourteen years after Södergran's death, the author Jarl Hemmer said that her poetry surely had meaning but did not believe that it would be appreciated by people in general.

She was often fascinated by expressionism but later broadened her lyrical expression. She has come to be called a modernist, despite being considered, along with Elmer Diktonius and Rabbe Enckell and others, for the most part distinct.

Of her poems, some of the most well-known are Svart eller vitt ("Black or White"), Ingenting ("Nothing"), Min barndoms träd ("My Childhood's Trees") and Landet som icke är ("The Land which is not"). Her most quoted poem is probably Dagen svalnar... ("The Day Cools..."), which deals with feelings such as longing, fear, closeness and distance.

Södergran's poetic authority and her sense of herself were clearly liberated by her reading of Nietzsche and her acceptance of the concept of the superman. In her middle-period poems, we often meet a commanding figure – a prophet, a princess, a saint, or simply an imposing "I" projecting their will, visions and feelings. This kind of assertiveness, particularly coming from a woman writer, has been an obstacle to some reading her work and a highly attractive and convincing element to others. But Södergran herself was enough of a realist to know that these personae are not simply to be conflated with her own private self – she obliquely refers to that distinction several times in her letters to Hagar Olsson, and many people who knew her have attested that she was aware of it – so the ego in her production can be a role that she will visit and investigate, as in the poems Rosenaltaret ("The Rose Altar"), Stormen ("The Storm") (there are two poems with this title, both of them with a visionary slant), Skaparegestalter ("Creator Figures"), Vad är mitt hemland ("What Is My Homeland?"), and many others. In Den stora trädgården ("The Big Garden), a beautiful 1920 poem about the mission of artists and the new age, she states openly that "Naked we walk in shredded clothes ..." and that artists have no outward power and should not aim to have any:

If I had a big garden
I would invite all my brothers and sisters there.
Each one would bring a large treasure.
We own nothing, thus we could become one people.
We shall build bars around our garden
letting no sound from the world reach us.
Out of our silent garden
we shall bring the world a new life.

The poem was originally sent to Hagar Olsson in an April 1920 letter where Edith recounts flu, abject poverty, and a humiliating attempt to sell some old underwear to get money. Gunnar Tideström has commented that "few documents of her hand give such a striking idea of her day-to-day self", and that "she admits that life is cruel and that she will perish if this goes on for much longer – but it is not a self-pitying letter; it glows with light".

== Bibliography ==
Södergran released four volumes of poetry during her short lifetime. After her death, Landet som icke är ("The Land which Is Not") was released, containing a collection of poems that had been rejected from her earlier volumes.

- Dikter ("Poems", 1916)
- Septemberlyran ("The September Lyre", 1917)
- Rosenaltaret ("The Rose Altar", 1919)
- Brokiga iakttagelser
- Framtidens skugga ("The Shadow of the Future", 1920).
- Tankar om naturen
- Landet som icke är ("The Land which Is Not", 1925)

Works in English

- Complete Poems. Translated by David McDuff. Bloodaxe Books, 1984, 1992. ISBN 9780906427385
- Love & Solitude, selected poems by Edith Södergran. Bilingual centennial edition. Translated by Stina Katchadourian. Fjord Press, 1992. ISBN 9780940242142
- Poems by Edith Södergran translated by Gounil Brown, Icon Press. 1990, ISBN 9780951106952
- We Women translated by Samuel Charters. Tavern Books, 2015. ISBN 9781935635468
- Modern Woman translated by CD Eskilson. World Poetry Books, 2026. ISBN 9781954218437

Vaxdukshäftet (written 1907–09), from her teenage years in St. Petersburg and Raivola, was released in Finland in 1961 by Olof Enckell (with the title "Ungdomsdikter 1907–1909" (Childhood poems 1907–1909). These had been previously analyzed by several researchers, including Gunnar Tideström and Ernst Brunner, and by Enckell himself. The manuscript, like many of Södergran's original manuscripts, is in an archive in Finland.

Junge Schwedischsprachige lyrik in Finnland is an anthology that Södergran also worked on during 1921–22 and which she hoped to have published in Germany in order to be able to launch young Swedish language Finnish poetry there. She undertook the task of translating a portion of her own poetry, similar to Diktonius and a number of other poets from the previous generation. A German publishing house declined in the end to publish – not entirely unexpected since this was just as hyper inflation and instability were at their height in Germany – and the manuscript disappeared.

Samlade dikter ("Collected Poems") was released in 1949 in Helsinki; it contained everything that had previously come out in book form, plus some of Södergran's unpublished poems, of which a dozen would not be printed again until fifty years later.

The seven original collections are available in electronic form from Project Runeberg (see external link below).
