= Finland-Swedish literature =

Swedish-language literature from Finland

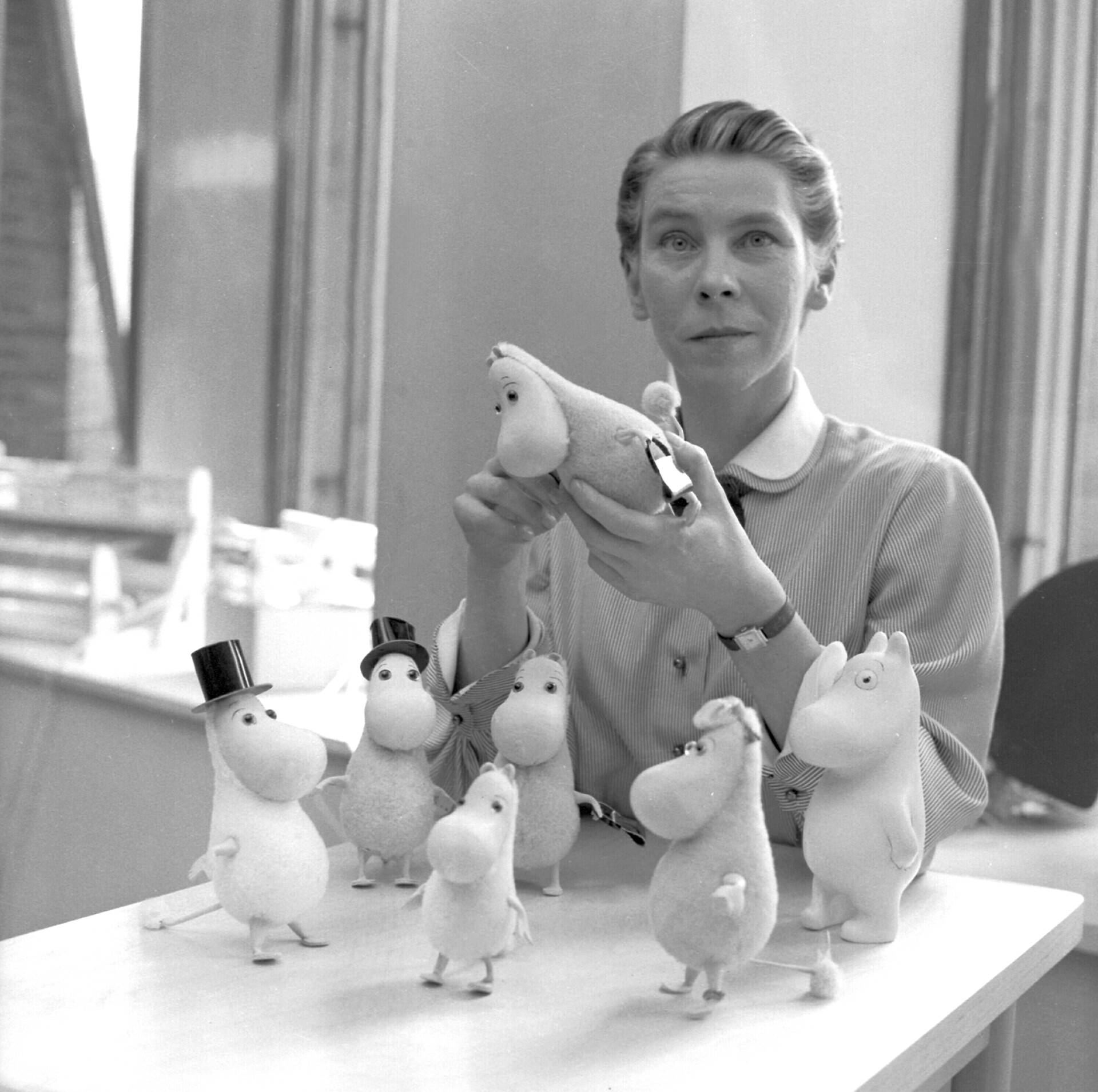
Books by Tove Jansson about the Moomins gained an international readership (1956)

Finland-Swedish literature refers to a branch of Nordic literature based on the works of Finland-Swedish writers and poets from Finland and generally published in this country. The literature of the autonomous Åland Islands is often also included in Finland-Swedish literature.

While earlier literary periods largely coincide with those of Swedish literature, its younger literary tradition – with authors such as Johan Ludvig Runeberg, Edith Södergran, Tove Jansson and Tua Forsström – is typically described as linguistically part of Swedish but a culturally and institutionally distinct branch of Swedish literature. Finland-Swedish literature, at the intersection of nation (Finland) and language (Swedish), developed its own movements and its production and reception take place under different conditions in bilingual Finland than in Sweden. It can therefore also be described as a form of minority literature.

== Background ==
Until 1809, Finland formed the eastern half of the Kingdom of Sweden. Throughout the country, the same written languages were originally used – primarily Swedish, but also Latin, Low German, and French. Although Mikael Agricola had translated the New Testament into Finnish during the Reformation, other Finnish-language publications remained rare, as the upper classes were predominantly Swedish-speaking and even educated native speakers of Finnish often used Swedish in public life.

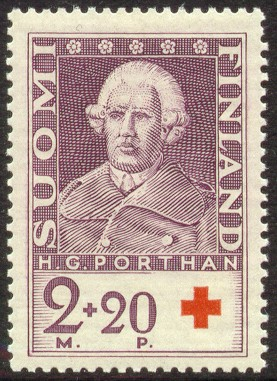
Henrik Gabriel Porthan on a Finnish postage stamp (1935)

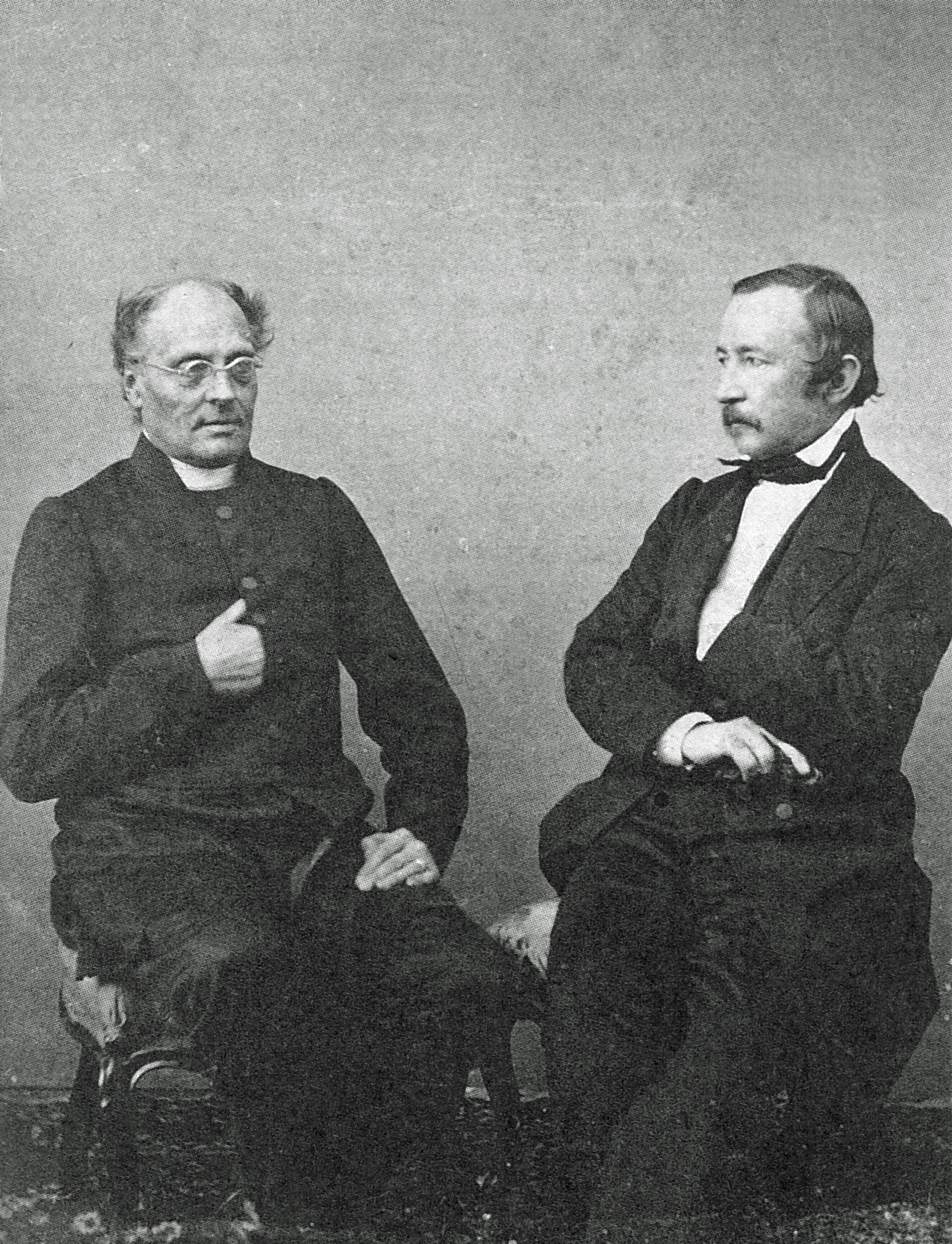
Johan Ludvig Runeberg and Zacharias Topelius (1863)

During the Age of Enlightenment, the most successful author in Finland writing in Swedish was Count Gustaf Philip Creutz (1735–1781), an aristocrat who spent much of his life in Sweden or working as a diplomat in Spain and France after completing his studies in Åbo (Turku). He wrote the love story Atis och Camilla in the style of a pastoral, once a classic of Swedish literature and still widely read today.

The historian and director of the Royal Academy of Åbo, Henrik Gabriel Porthan, wrote in Swedish and Latin. A proponent of Finnish culture, he encouraged the collection of Finnish folk poetry and founded both the Aurora Society and Tidningar Utgifne Af et Sällskap i Åbo, the first newspaper in Finland, in 1771 (published in Swedish).

== 19th century ==
During the 19th century, the so-called Fennoman movement emerged, leading to the establishment of Finnish as a national language. Many Finland-Swedes began to use Finnish, and the first works of Finnish literature appeared. At the same time, Swedish continued to be used and has retained its status as an official national and literary language of Finland, constitutionally equal to Finnish.

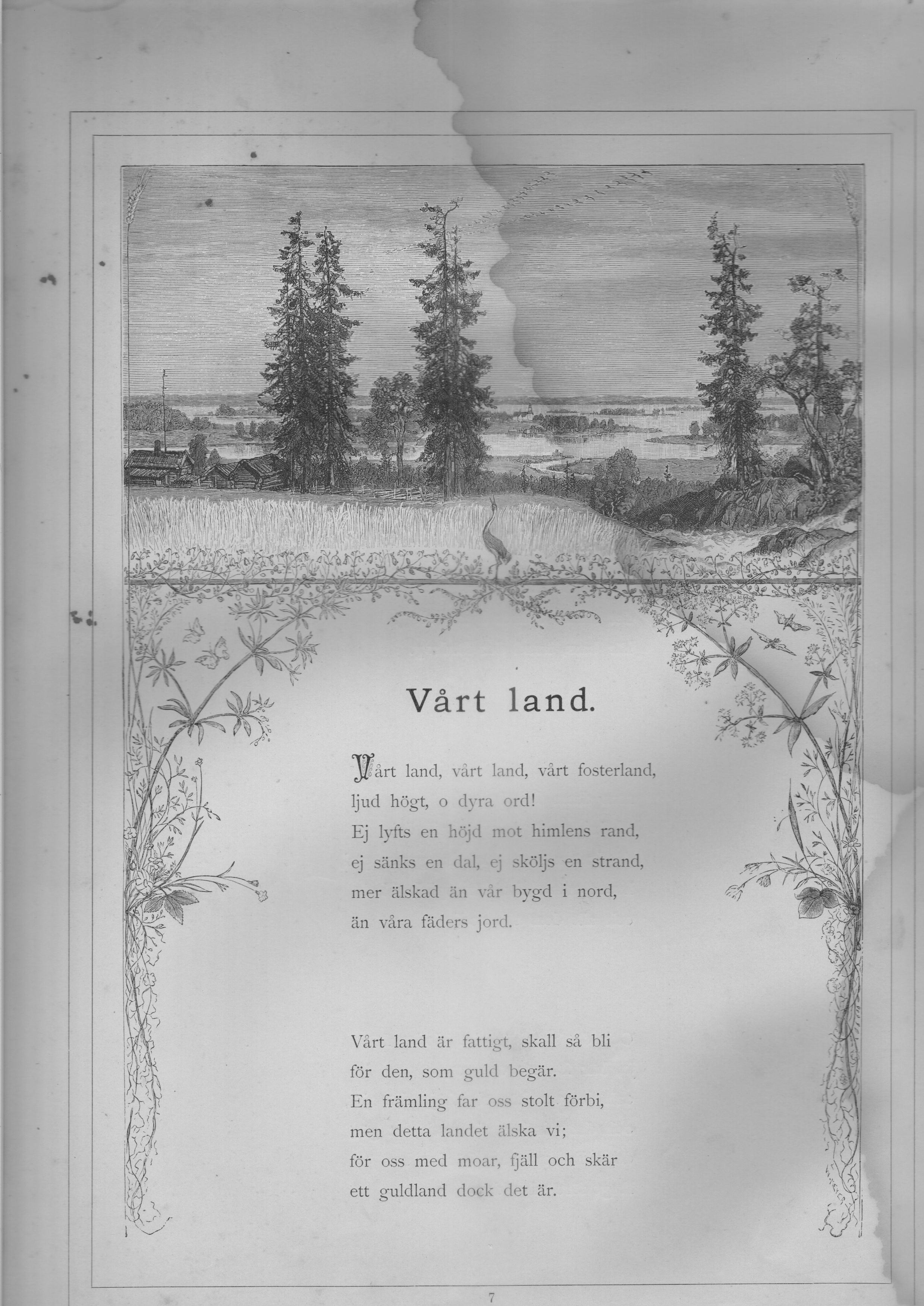
The future Finnish national anthem (Swedish: Vårt Land, 'Our Land') from the prologue to Fänrik Ståls sägner by Johan Ludvig Runeberg

Johan Ludvig Runeberg is primarily known as a poet of nature and the author of idyllic narrative poems. In Finland, however, he became famous through his later patriotic work Fänrik Ståls sägner ('The Tales of Ensign Stål', 1848; second volume 1860), which idealised the image of the Finns in line with contemporary Fennoman ideals. The collection of popular-romantic war ballads in various verse forms depicts the heroic deeds of Finns in the Finnish War of 1808–1809, focusing on simple, brave, and modest rural people, while also criticising the Swedish king and military leadership responsible for the defeat in the war against the Russian Empire. Published in the revolutionary year 1848, the first volume established Runeberg as Finland's national poet. The work was translated into Finnish only in 1867 by Julius Krohn.

Karl August Tavaststjerna (1860–1898) is often regarded as the first modern Finland-Swedish author. Other important 19th-century authors include Fredrika Runeberg, Zacharias Topelius and Josef Julius Wecksell.

== 20th century ==
While earlier literary periods in Finland and Sweden coincided and Runeberg's work was long regarded as a national classic in both countries, Södergran's Dikter ('Poems', 1916) marked the beginning of a new era in Nordic literature through Finland-Swedish modernism. Other important representatives of the Finland-Swedish avant-garde include Henry Parland, Elmer Diktonius, Gunnar Björling and Rabbe Enckell.

Other prominent representatives of 20th-century Finland-Swedish literature include Runar Schildt, Bo Carpelan, Gösta Ågren, Lars Huldén, Henrik Tikkanen, Märta Tikkanen, Jörn Donner and Lars Sund.

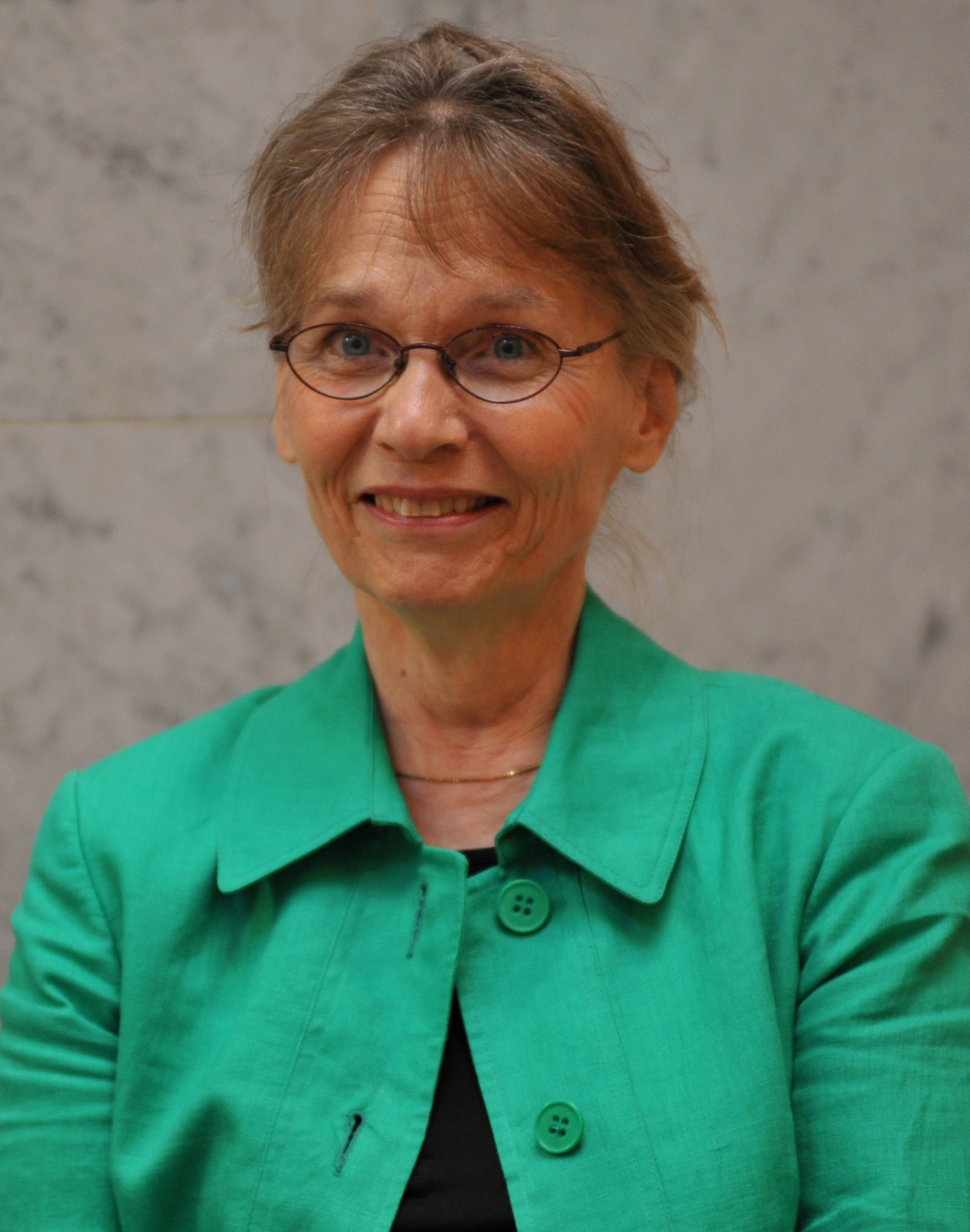
Ulla-Lena Lundberg (2012)

In children's literature and young adult fiction, important 20th-century figures included Lisa Cawén, Nanny Hammarström, John Berg, Viola Renvall and Irmelin Sandman Lilius. The most internationally renowned children's author, however, was Tove Jansson, especially for her stories and comics about the Moomins. Jansson also wrote widely read novels and short stories for adults, including Sommarboken (1972; The Summer Book).

== Contemporary writers ==
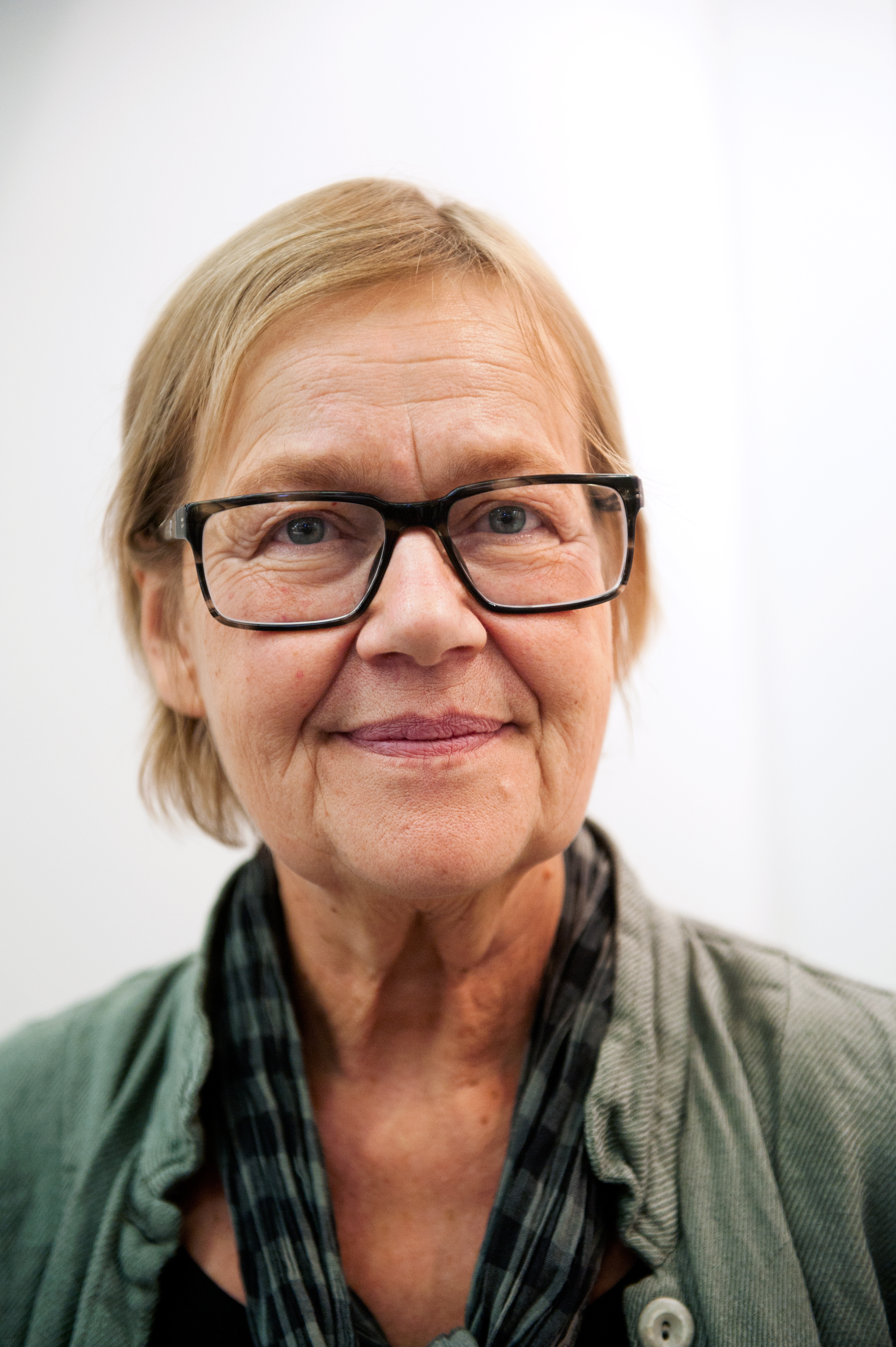
Tua Forsström (2011)

The production of new Finland-Swedish novels remains relatively strong. Established novelists such as Ulla-Lena Lundberg, Kjell Westö, Peter Sandström and Monika Fagerholm are read not only in Finland but also in Sweden. Fagerholm was the first Finland-Swedish author to receive the prestigious August Prize and is among the most widely translated contemporary Finland-Swedish writers.

Other highly successful authors include Hannele Mikaela Taivassalo, Philip Teir and Maria Turtschaninoff. Merete Mazzarella is known for her essayistic and autobiographical works. In children's literature and young adult fiction, particularly successful contemporary authors include Sanna Mander and Karin Erlandsson. The internationally acclaimed poet Tua Forsström was elected to the Swedish Academy in 2019.

== Periodicals ==
Nya Argus (founded in 1907) is one of the oldest Finland-Swedish cultural journals, known for essays on literature, philosophy, and society. Horisont (founded in 1954) is a cultural and literary magazine that frequently publishes essays, criticism, and thematic issues. Ny Tid (founded in 1944) is a cultural and political magazine combining literature, essays, and social commentary from a left-leaning perspective.

The largest Finland-Swedish daily newspaper, Hufvudstadsbladet (founded in 1864), also publishes literary reviews and serves as an important forum for cultural debate.

One of the most important Finland-Swedish scholarly periodicals is Finsk Tidskrift (founded in 1876), which publishes research-based essays and reviews.

== Cultural significance ==
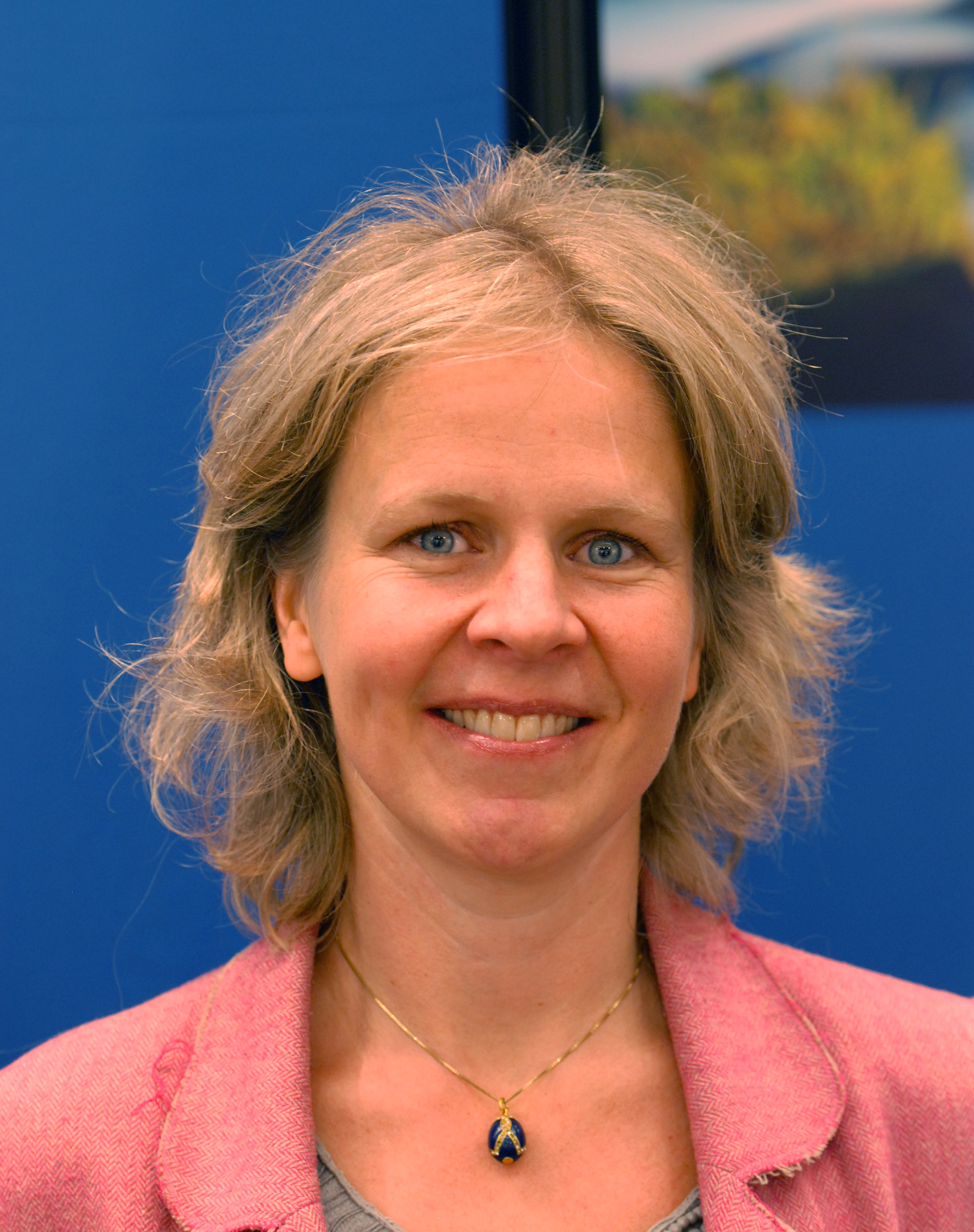
Finland-Swedish journalist Anna-Lena Laurén is a popular non-fiction writer (2013)

Original literature in one's mother tongue is of great importance in multilingual Finland, where only one in five published books is a translation. Another characteristic of the Finnish book market is the relatively significant share of non-fiction.

Finland-Swedish literature exists within a country that has a comparatively strong publishing industry. Finland has the highest number of published book titles per capita in the European Union and the second highest worldwide (as of 2007).

Although most titles are published in Finnish – in 2005 only about 5% of nearly 14,000 books published in Finland were in Swedish – Finland-Swedish literature remains vibrant, with around 200 titles published annually for a population of approximately 300,000. The overall trend, however, is downward: in the 1930s, Swedish-language titles accounted for about one fifth of all publications.

In 2014, Finland was Guest of Honour at the Frankfurt Book Fair in Germany, where contemporary Finland-Swedish literature was presented alongside Finnish and Sámi literature under the slogan FINLAND. COOL.

== Publishing ==
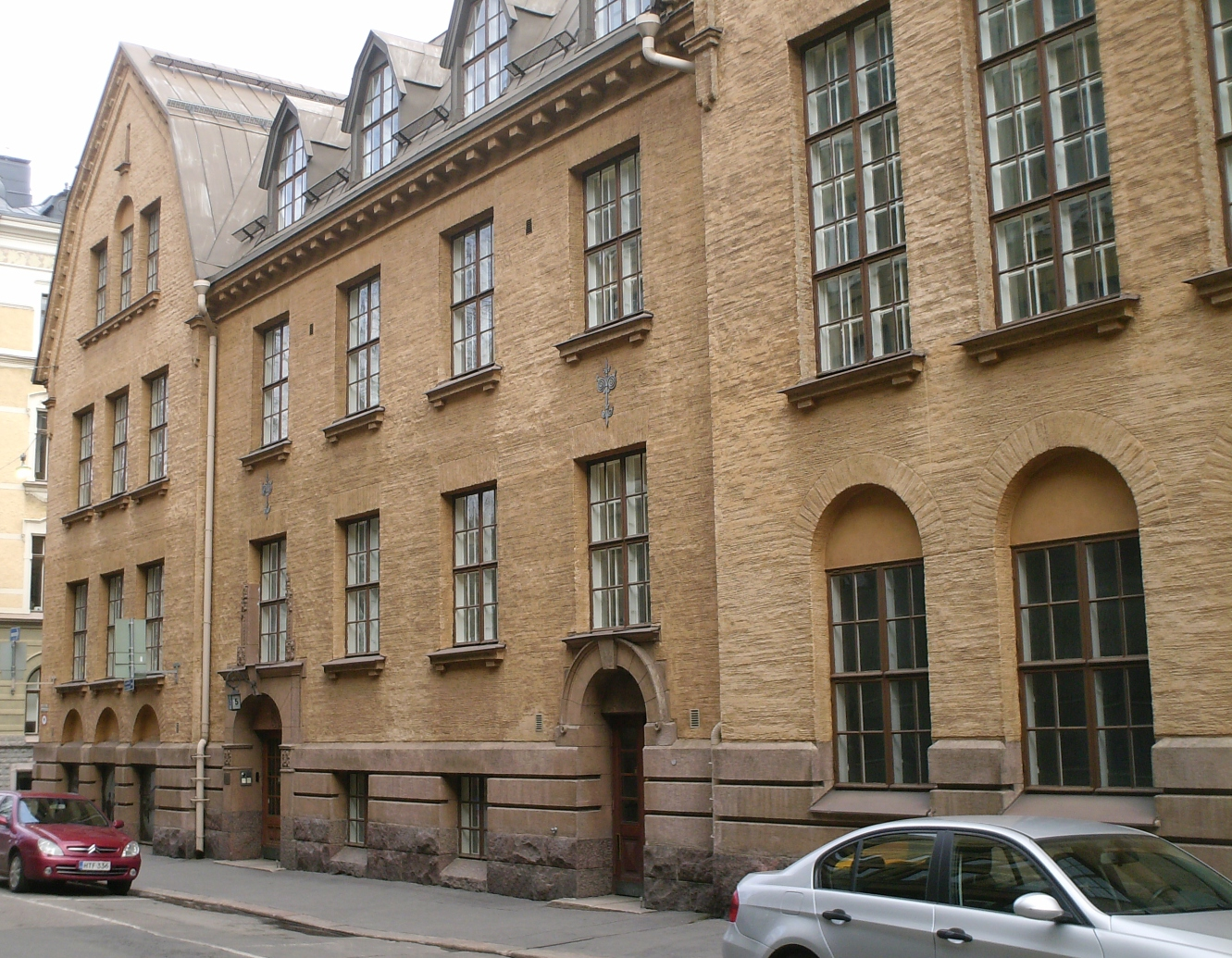
Headquarters of the Society of Swedish Literature in Finland in Helsingfors (Helsinki)

Although the number of authors is high relative to the Finland-Swedish population, most works are published by only around ten small publishing houses. In 2012, the merger of Schildts (founded 1913) and Söderström & Co. (founded 1893) created the dominant publisher Schildts & Söderströms. Other notable publishers include Förlaget M, Scriptum, Litorale, PQR (on Åland), and the publishing houses of the Society of Swedish Literature in Finland (Svenska Litteratursällskapet i Finland) and Åbo Akademi.

Because the Swedish book market is largely independent, only a few Finland-Swedish authors reach Swedish readers through Swedish publishers. And relatively few works are translated into Finnish.

The organisation FILI – Finnish Literature Exchange supports the translation and international promotion of Finland-Swedish literature.

== Writers' associations ==
The Society of Swedish Authors in Finland (Finlands svenska författareförening) was founded in 1919 in Helsingfors (Helsinki). The founding negotiations were led by Runar Schildt, with Hagar Olsson serving as secretary, and the proposal preceding the decision was presented by Werner Söderhjelm. It represents professional fiction writers who write in Swedish in Finland and safeguards their moral, legal, and collective economic interests, including authors' rights. The association had approximately 200 members in 2009. Hannele Mikaela Taivassalo has served as chairperson since 2019.

Another writers' association in Finland, not specific to the Swedish language, is the Association of Finnish Nonfiction Writers (Swedish: Finlands facklitterära författare), which is the largest writers' organisation in Finland.

Finland-Swedish writers are also organised in international associations, including the Baltic Centre for Writers and Translators and the European Writers' Council.

== Literary awards ==
Several works by Finland-Swedish authors have received the Nordic Council Literature Prize (Nordic Countries), the Finlandia Prize, the Runeberg Prize (both Finland) or the August Prize (Sweden). Awards specific to Finland-Swedish literature include the Karl Emil Tollander Prize and Svenska Yle's Literature Prize.

Unlike many other minority literatures, Finland-Swedish literature is strongly represented within literary prize culture. It has been shown that Finland-Swedish authors are statistically overrepresented among nominees and recipients of major literary awards in Sweden and Finland, as well as of the principal Nordic literary prizes.

== Weblinks ==
- Society of Swedish Authors in Finland (Swedish)
- Tour of prose, poetry and publishing (incl. Finland-Swedish books)
- Spotlight on Finland-Swedish Literature
- Finland-Swedish book catalogue (Swedish)
