= Maria Antas =

Finland-Swedish writer and literary agent

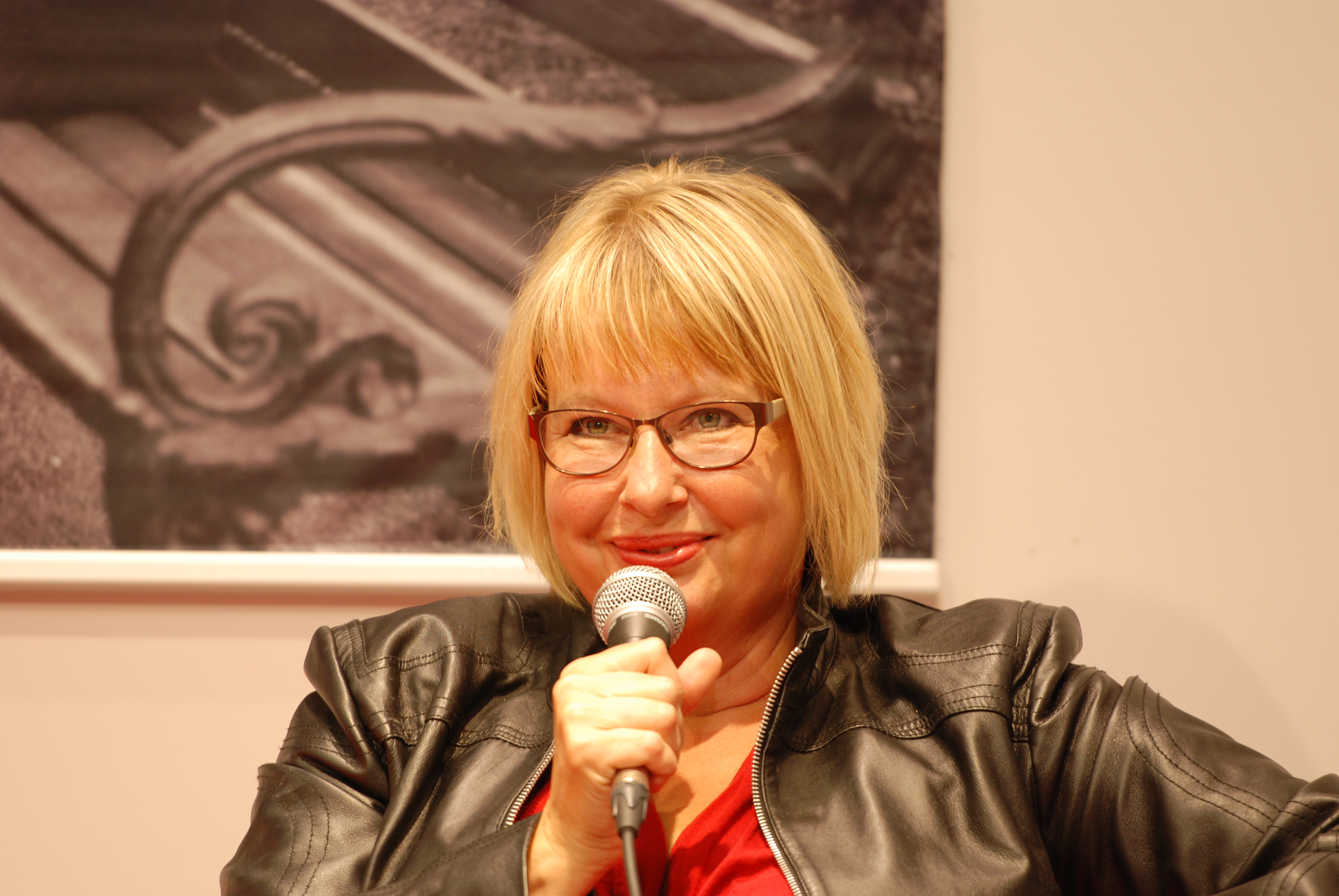
Maria Antas at Göteborg Book Fair 2013

Maria Antas (born 1964 in Borgå, Finland) is a Finland-Swedish writer and literary agent.

== Life ==
Antas worked as a researcher and literary critic at the Society of Swedish Literature in Finland before becoming editor-in-chief of the feminist cultural magazine Astra Nova around the turn of the millennium. She later worked at FILI – Finnish Literature Exchange, representing literature from Finland internationally, and served as programme director for Finland’s Guest of Honour initiative FINLAND. COOL. at the Frankfurt Book Fair in 2014. Since 2015, she has been the director of the literary agency Antas Bindermann Listau, based in Berlin.

== Work ==
Anta's work includes poetry and fiction. Her book En stor bok om städning received an award from the Society of Swedish Literature in Finland in 2014. In the book, the author engages with the everyday, investing it with substance through witty associations, wide-ranging knowledge, and coherent lines of thought. Out of the ordinary, new insights emerge, and the act of cleaning expands into a rich tapestry of roaming ideas, where unforeseen connections take shape and appear entirely natural.

== Bibliography ==
- En stor bok om städning. Essäer och tankeflykt Helsingfors: Schildts & Söderströms, 2013
- Hår. Fint, fult, fräckt och fusk Helsingfors: Förlaget M, 2016
