= Roshchino, Leningrad Oblast =

Roshchino Рощино
- Urban-type settlement
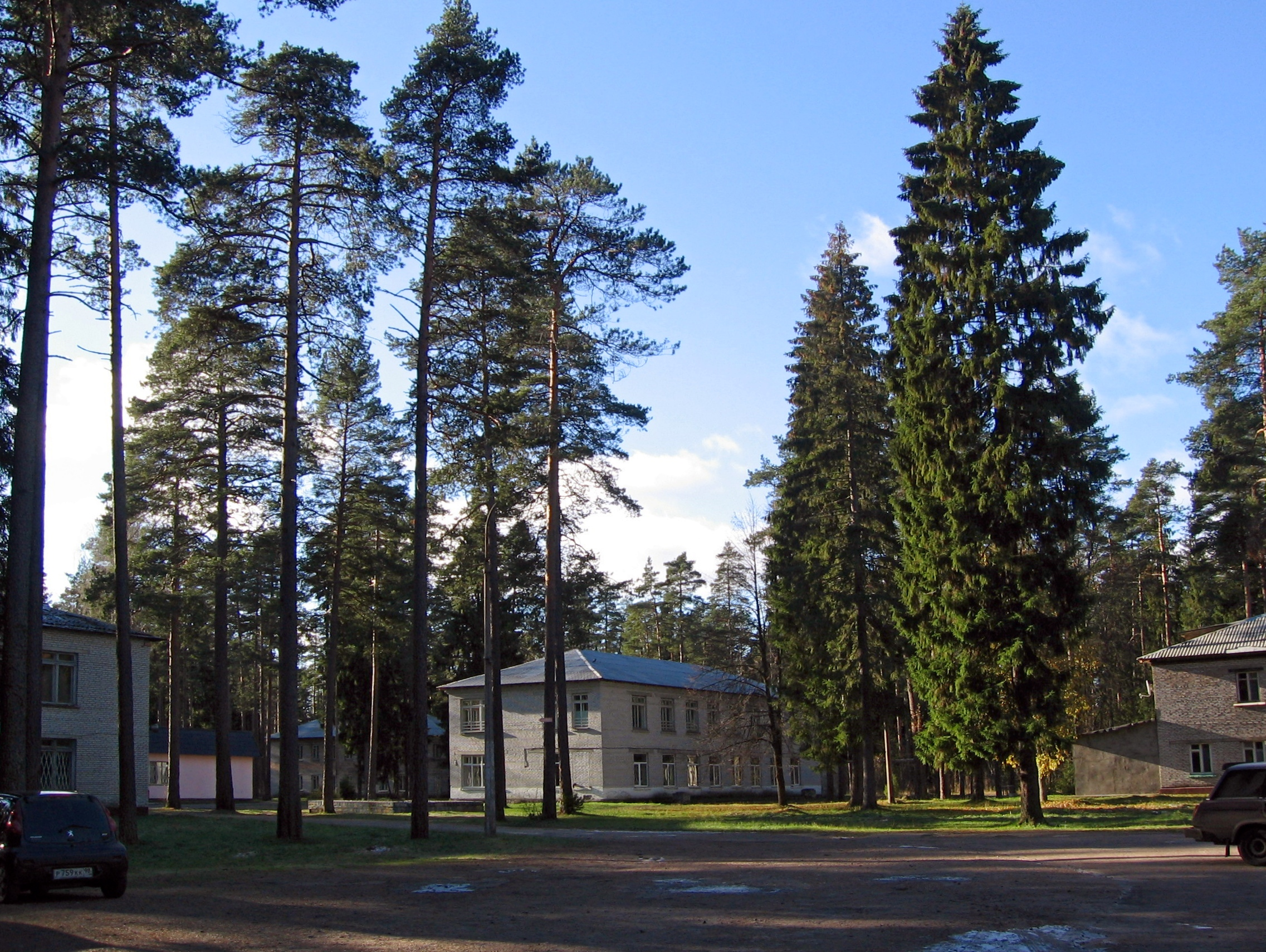
- Interactive map of Roshchino
- Location of Roshchino Roshchino (Leningrad Oblast)
- Coordinates: 60°14′50″N 29°36′40″E
- Country: Russia
- Federal subject: Leningrad Oblast
- Administrative district: Vyborgsky District
- Urban-type settlement status since: 1959

Population (2010 Census)
  - Total: 13,439
  - Estimate (2024): 16,331 (+21.5%)

Municipal status
  - Municipal district: Vyborgsky Municipal District
  - Urban settlement: Roshchinskoye Urban Settlement
  - Capital of: Roshchinskoye Urban Settlement
- Time zone: UTC+3 (MSK)
- Postal code: 188820
- OKTMO ID: 41615158051
- Website: рощино.рф

Roshchino (Russian: Ро́щино; Finnish: Raivola), Raivola before 1948, is an urban locality (an urban-type settlement) in Vyborgsky District of Leningrad Oblast, Russia, and a station on the Saint Petersburg-Vyborg railroad. It is situated on the Karelian Isthmus 60 kilometers (37 mi) northwest of St. Petersburg, approximately halfway to Vyborg. Population: 13,439 (2010 census); 9,393 (2002 census); 8,436 (1989 Soviet census).

In the wooded areas surrounding Roshchino there are multiple marshes and small lakes. Lintula larch forest is located some 3 kilometers (1.9 mi) to the west from the railroad station.

== History ==
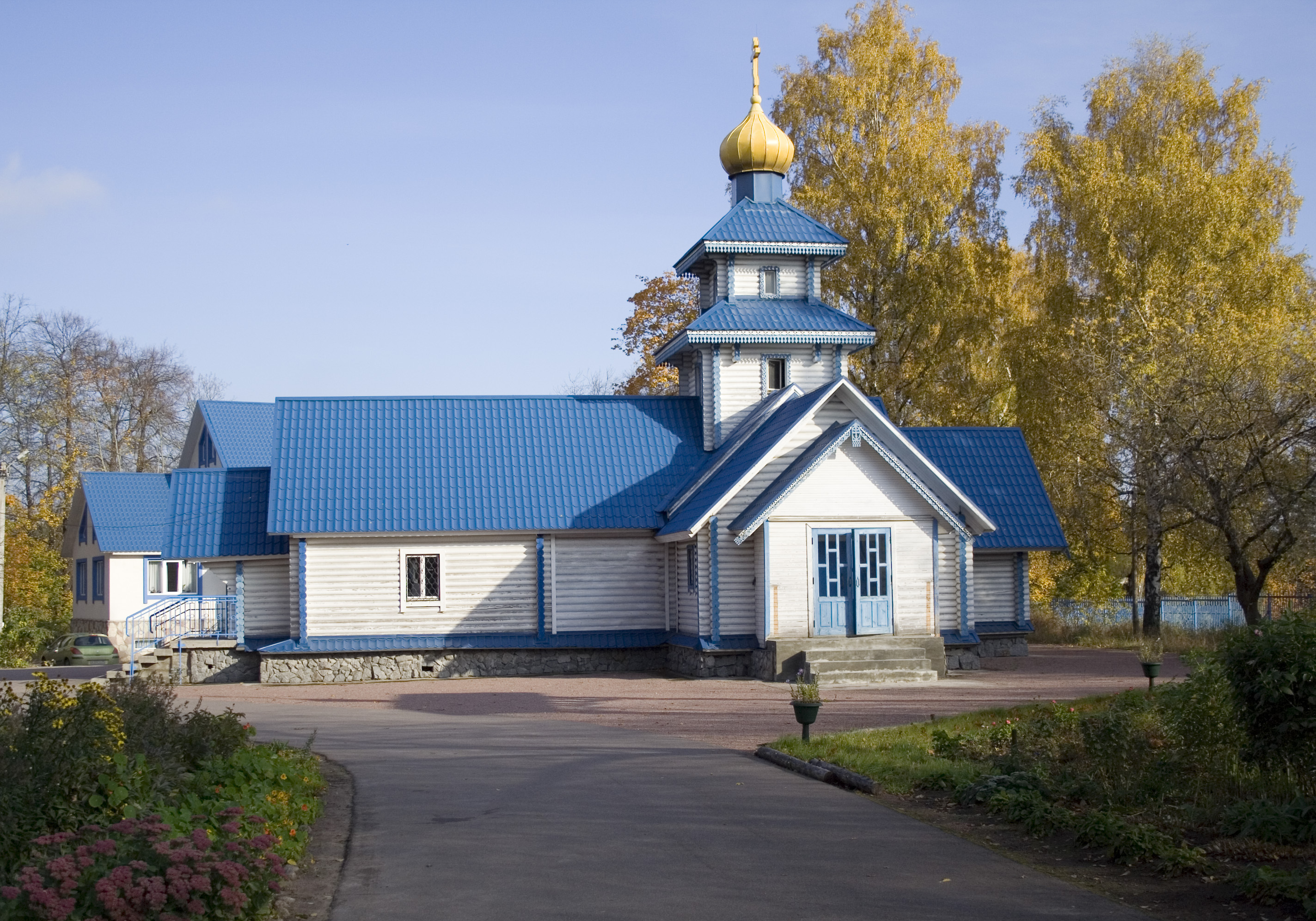
Saint Nicholas Church in Roshchino

Raivola was first shown on maps of Finland in the 16th century. After 1812 it was under jurisdiction of Grand Duchy of Finland being part of Russian Empire, a part of Viipuri Province. The mixed Russian-Finnish population of the area was engaged in agriculture. Around 1802 count Saltykov resettled some 609 of his subjects from Oryol Governorate to the area to meet growing manpower demands for his iron works; in addition to the iron foundry maps of mid-19th century also show a sawmill. After the railroad to Helsinki was opened by czar Alexander II in 1870, Raivola was used for changing of locomotive crews. Establishment of the railroad station turned Raivola into a suburb of St. Petersburg and development of the area continued with construction of summer cottages. By the end of the century the population stood around 2,000, of which 169 were Finns. The village had shops, warehouses, two (Finnish and Russian) schools, and Russian Orthodox church of St. Nicholas with a library and medical facility. A hydro-electric power station and a telephone station were also established. The importance of the local railway station was eclipsed by Terijoki where a Finnish customs depot was established in 1911

In the first quarter of the 20th century Raivola was a summer home (and after 1914 the permanent home) to the Finland-Swedish family of the young modernist poet Edith Södergran who died there in 1923.

After the Russian October Revolution and independence of Finland, Raivola was recognized as part of Finnish Karelia by articles of the Treaty of Tartu in 1920, while the majority of Russian inhabitants had left. The Soviet Union gained control of Raivola following the Winter War in 1940. The Soviet government's decree of May 28, 1940 provided for establishment of collective farms and resettlement of Russians from Yaroslavl Oblast. Plans of Stalin's government also included forced population transfer of native Finns (116 people, mostly sick and elderly) to Kazakhstan however were disrupted by the Nazi Germany and its Axis allies invasion.

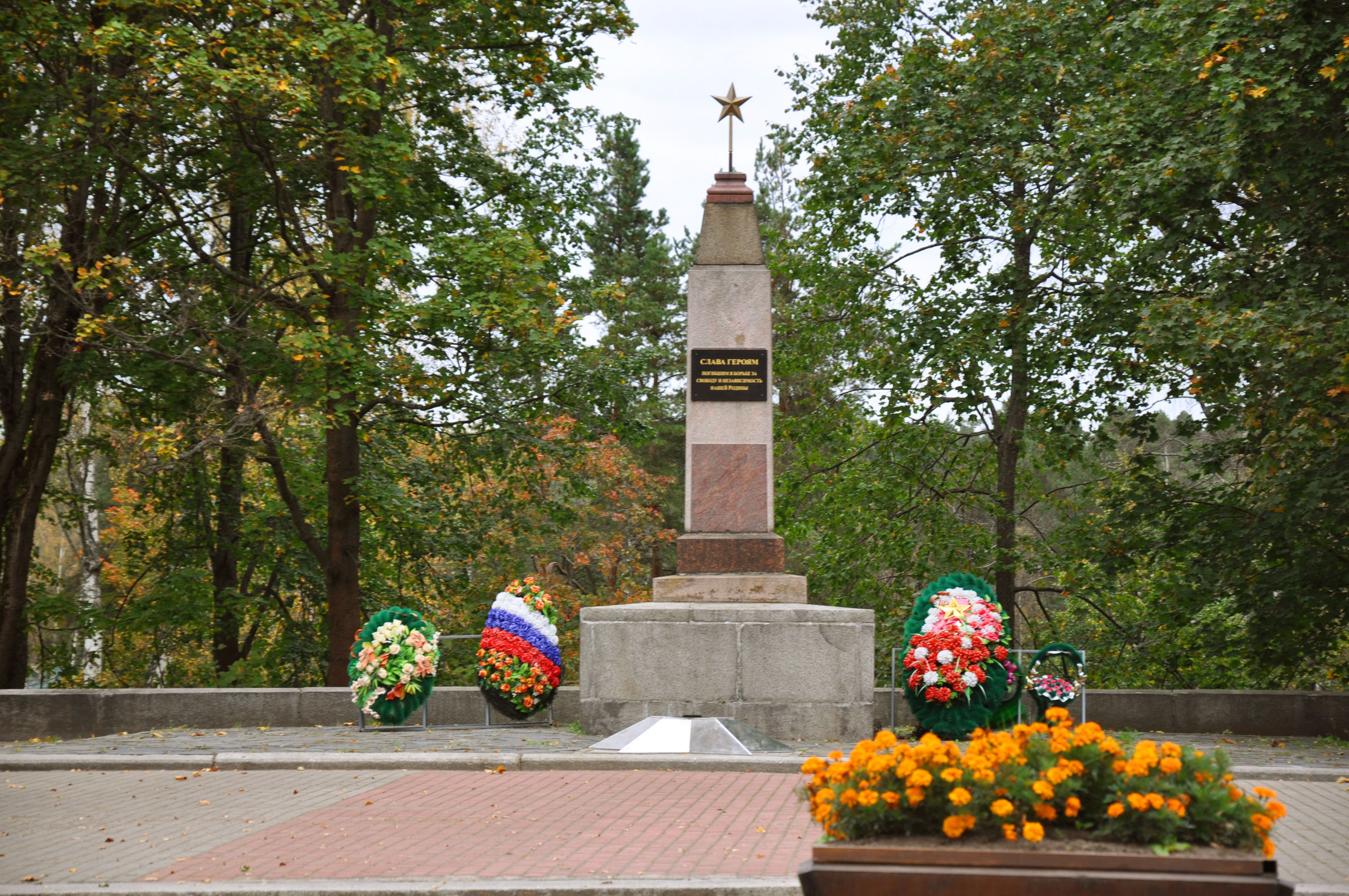
World War II memorial

On May 16, 1940 Kannelyarvsky District with the administrative center in the selo of Kanneljärvi was established. It was a part of Leningrad Oblast. On August 22, 1945 the district center was moved from Kannelyarvi to Raivola, and the district was renamed Rayvolovsky. On October 1, 1948 the district was renamed Roshchinsky, and on January 12, 1949 all Finnish names of the localities were replaced with Russian names. In particular, Rayvola was renamed Roshchino. On July 31, 1959 Roshchino was granted urban-type settlement status. On February 1, 1963 Roshchinsky District was abolished and merged into Vyborgsky District.

In 1948, the village again became a Leningrad suburb (the railroad was electrified in 1954) with seasonal swelling of population due to widespread construction of summer cottages, development of privately owned and leased garden plots, establishment of recreational facilities, and youth summer camps.

A monument to Edith Södergran was built in 1960.

== Lintula Larch Forest ==
The Lintula Larch Forest (Russian: Корабельная роща, Korabelnaya roshcha, lit. shipbuilding timber grove, or Линдуловская лиственничная роща; Finnish: Lehtikuusimetsä) had a major impact on the cultivation of larch throughout the world and is considered one of the most important cultivated forests in northern Europe. It was established by order of Peter the Great to supply the Russian Navy with shipbuilding timber. Ferdinand Gabriel Fockel, a German forest expert, established the oldest stands in 1738–1750 with seedlings of European Larch (Larix decidua) from the province of Arkhangelsk. Since then the area of the forest has expanded and currently the total area of larch is 55.9 ha (23.5 ha of the 'old stands' established before 1851 still remain).

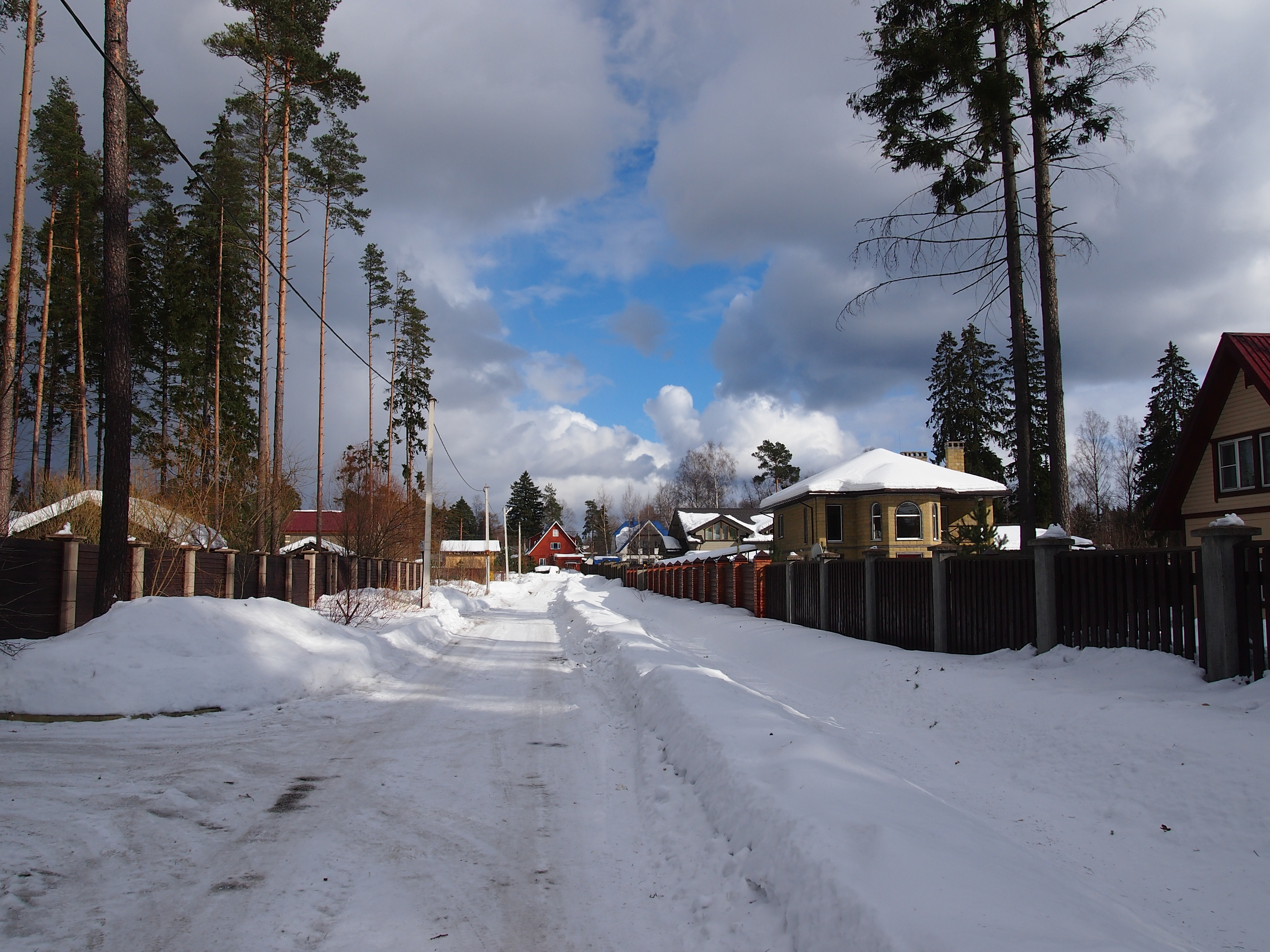
A street in Roshchino

== Possible origins of name ==
- Two versions explaining the origins of the name Raivola exist: one using Finnish verb raivata, which means "to clean" or "to grub out", and second deriving from the adjective raivo—"mad", possibly alluding to the riding style of Russian coachmen, settled here in time of Peter the Great. The latter version is less likely since the coach station and adjacent residences were located not in Raivola but in neighboring Kivennapa.
- Name Roshchino used after 1948 is derived from "роща" (roshcha, meaning "grove") referring to the Lintula larch grove.

== Economy ==
=== Transportation ===
Roshchino railway station is located on the railway line between Saint Petersburg and Vyborg. There is suburban service to the Finland Station in Saint Petersburg.

Roshchino is adjacent to Zelenogorsk and is thus a suburb of Saint Petersburg. It is included in the suburban road network of Saint Petersburg.
