= Vilhelm Ekelund =

Swedish poet (1880–1949)

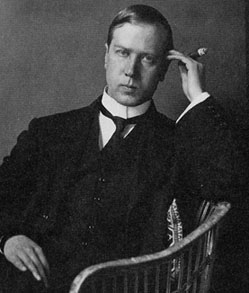
Vilhelm Ekelund

Vilhelm Ekelund (October 14, 1880 – September 3, 1949) was a Swedish poet. He is best known for his collections of poetry, such as Havets stjärna (1906), and Melodier i skymning (1902). His works often focus on the beauty of nature and the struggle between nature and modern life.

== Career ==
The works of Ekelund were influenced by Friedrich Hölderlin, Friedrich Nietzsche, and Emanuel Swedenborg. His early career was lyrical, and though not widely recognized at the time, his poetic work, almost wholly produced in the first decade of the century, became a formative influence on many later Swedish poets. His grasp of rhythmic and musical qualities in verse and his concentrated imagery propelled his poetry into increasingly ambitious forms, soon moving from bound to free verse, and making it a vital model for later writers such as Karin Boye, Erik Lindegren, Gunnar Björling and others.

From 1907, after an affair with Amelie Posse and an increasing conviction that poetry was an unsatisfactory, vain medium, he turned away from poems and devoted himself to essays and aphoristic prose in a highly personal and sometimes near impenetrable style.

== Works ==
- Melodier i skymning ('Melodies at Dusk', 1902)
- Havets stjärna ('Star of the Sea', 1906)
- Antikt ideal ('The Ancient Ideal', 1909)
- Böcker och vandringar ('Books and Wanderings', 1910)
- På havsstranden ('On the Sea Shore', 1922)
