= Schildts & Söderströms =

Finnish book publisher

- Predecessor: Schildts, Söderströms
- Founded: 2012
- Country of origin: Finland
- Headquarters location: Helsinki

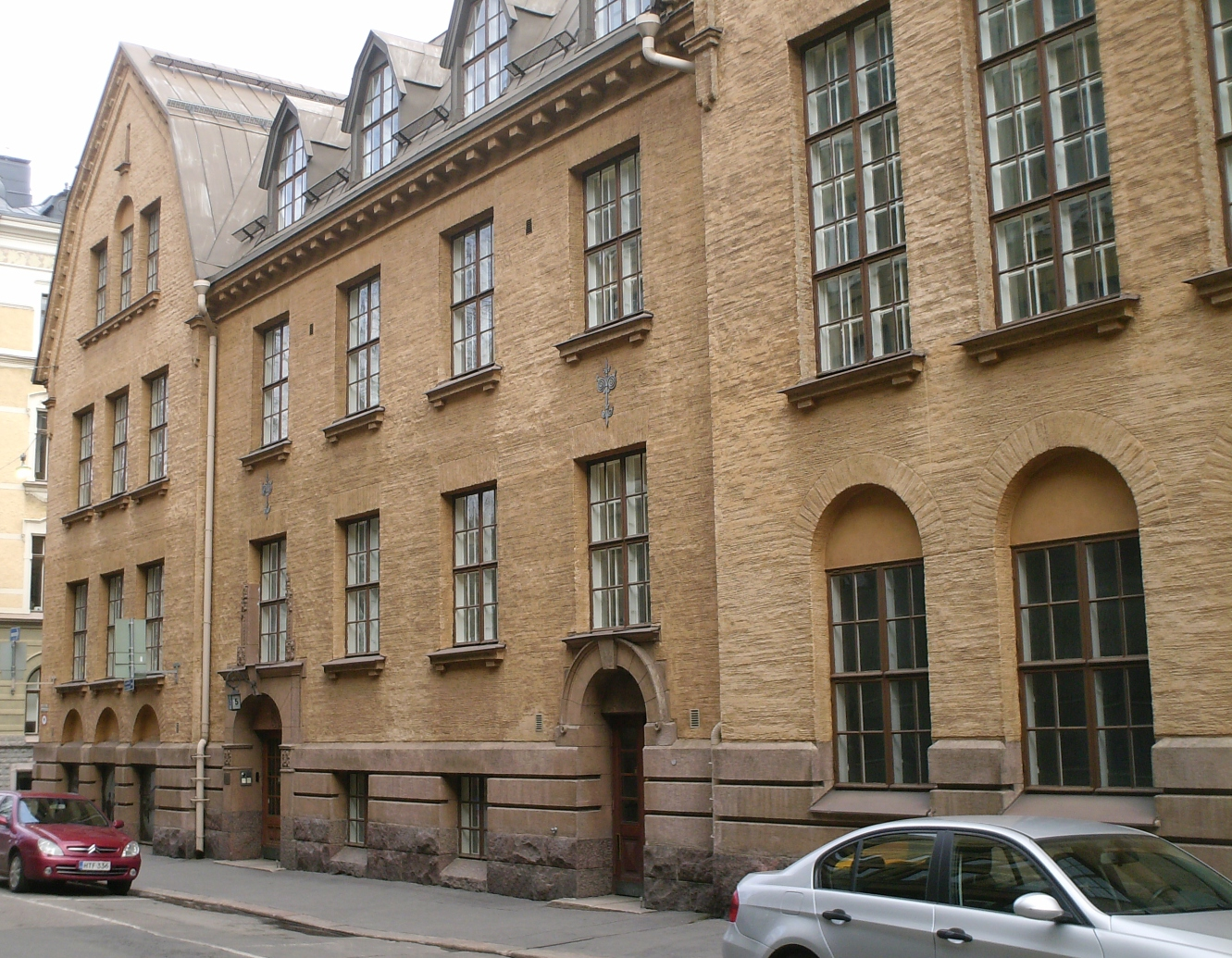
Headquarters of the Society of Swedish Literature in Finland in Helsingfors (Helsinki); the same building also hosts the publisher Schildts & Söderströms; photo: Markus Lång

Schildts & Söderströms is a Finland Swedish publishing company, established in February 2012 through a merger between Schildts Förlags Ab and Söderström & Co.

The publisher is based in Helsinki and one of the most important actors in the field of Finland-Swedish literature]. Its first managing director was Barbro Teir until February 2014. She was succeeded by Mari Koli.

The company has three imprints: S&S Litteratur, its Swedish-language publisher; S&S Läromedel, the largest publisher of Swedish-language teaching materials in Finland; and Kustantamo S&S, the largest publisher of Finland Swedish translations in Finnish. It publishes approximately 40 titles a year in a variety of genres, including children's literature, novels, and nonfiction.

== Authors ==
Schildts & Söderströms has published books by Finland-Swedish authors such as:

- Maria Antas
- Claes Andersson
- Staffan Bruun
- Eva-Stina Byggmästar
- Bo Carpelan
- Claes Andersson
- Jörn Donner
- Ulla Donner
- Karin Erlandsson
- Monika Fagerholm
- Tua Forsström
- Eva Frantz
- Lars Huldén
- Malin Klingenberg
- Zinaida Lindén
- Ulla-Lena Lundberg
- Merete Mazzarella
- Henrik Meinander
- Camilla Mickwitz
- Peter Sandström
- Ulf Stark
- Sanna Tahvanainen
- Henrik Tikkanen
- Märta Tikkanen
- Sofia Torvalds
- Maria Turtschaninoff
- Kjell Westö
- Gösta Ågren
- Robert Åsbacka
