= Gunnar Björling =

Finnish poet (1887-1960)

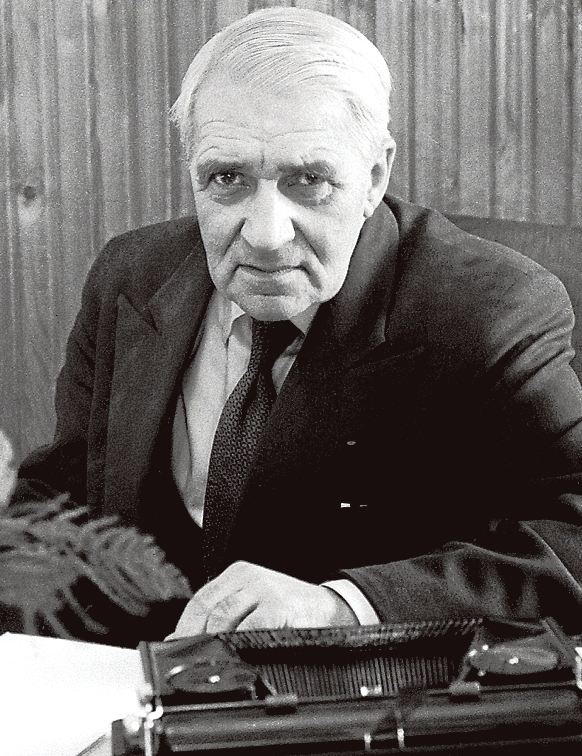
Gunnar Björling, 1960.

Gunnar Olof Björling (31 May 1887 – 11 July 1960) was a Swedish-speaking Finnish poet. He was one of the leading figures of Finnish-Swedish modernist literature, along with Elmer Diktonius, Edith Södergran and Hagar Olsson.

== Biography ==
Björling was born in Helsinki, to Edvard Björling (Åberg) and Lydia Maria Gustafsdotter Björling, with his brothers Bruno and Torsten. He spent his childhood in Helsinki and Viipuri, and the summer months in Kangasala. Between 1901 and 1902 he attended Hamina Cadet School, and then studied philosophy at the University of Helsinki. One of his teachers was the sociologist Edvard Westermarck, who influenced Björling's thinking. During his school years in Helsinki, Björling became a socialist, was active in the trade unions and participated in several minor operations. However, when the Finnish Civil War broke out in 1918, Björling supported the whites, and helped a telegraphist working for the whites by hiding him in his basement. After the war, Björling participated in one of the courts which sentenced captured reds. Later in life, however, he renounced and distanced himself from his activities during and after the war.

Björling's debut as a poet came in 1922, when he was 35 years old, with Vilande dag, which consists of prose poems and aphorisms, some of them one-liners. Between 1928 and 1929, he contributed to the Swedish-language modernist publication Quosego. Although Björling is principally considered a modernist poet, he also experimented with dadaism, and was sometimes called "Europe's last dadaist".

Björling was openly bisexual in an era when it was broadly seen as a social deviation. The psychoanalyst Mikael Enckell, son of fellow Finnish modernist writer Rabbe Enckell, made the following analysis of Björling's sexuality: "It is not enough that he apparently was bisexual in a time and in a generation when this was socially stigmatizing in a way we can imagine only with difficulty. He himself hardly wholeheartedly affirmed his bisexuality, it was connected with notions of deep shame, moral inferiority and deviation."

Björling died in Helsinki in 1960.

== Bibliography ==
- Vilande dag, 1922
- Korset och löftet, 1925
- Kiri-ra!, 1930
- Solgrönt, 1933
- Fågel badar snart i vatten, 1934
- Att syndens blåa nagel, 1936
- Där jag vet att du, 1938
- Det oomvända anletet, 1939
- Angelägenheten, 1940
- Ohjälpligheten, 1943
- O finns en dag, 1944
- Ord och att ej annat, 1945
- Luft är och ljus, 1946
- Ohört blott, 1948
- Vårt kattliv timmar, 1949
- Ett blyertsstreck, 1951
- Som alla dar, 1953
- Att i sitt öga, 1954
- Du går de ord, 1955
