= Söderströms Förlag =

Finnish Swedish-language publisher

Söderströms Förlags Ab
- Founded: 1860
- Founder: Gustaf Leopold Söderstrom
- Successor: Schildts & Söderströms
- Country of origin: Finland

Söderströms Förlags Ab was a Finland-Swedish book publisher, founded in 1891 by publisher Werner Söderström in Helsingfors (Finnisch Helsinki), Finland.

Gustaf Leopold Söderström had started a printing company and publishing house in 1860, Söderström & Co. His son, Werner Söderström, who had been active as a publisher since 1878, took over his father's publishing business in 1888. In 1891 he decided to divide his Swedish- and Finnish-language publishing activities between two corporations. The Finnish part became Werner Söderströms OY (commonly referred to as WSOY) while the Swedish part was sold to Förlags AB Söderström in order to allow him to concentrate on the Finnish publishing.

In 2012, Förlags AB Söderström merged with Schildts, the other major Finland-Swedish publishing house in Finland, to form Schildts & Söderströms. After the merger the market was dominated by one company. WSOY, in turn, was acquired by Sanoma in 1999 and later sold to Bonnier Group in 2011.
