= Elmer Diktonius =

Finnish poet and composer (1896–1961)

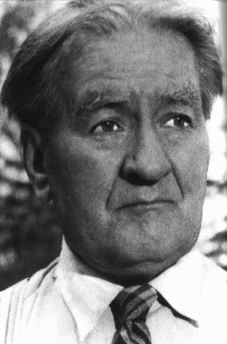
Diktonius in the 1950s

Elmer Rafael Diktonius (20 January 1896 – 23 September 1961) was a Finnish poet and composer, who wrote in both Swedish and in Finnish.

He was born in Helsinki and studied at the Helsinki Music Institute. He undertook several study trips abroad, including to France and England in 1921–22, Paris in 1925–27, and Prague in 1934. In 1922, he established an avant-garde magazine, Ultra, which had Finnish and Swedish editions. He was also involved in the establishment of another avant-garde magazine Quosego. In addition to his editorial work, he was a literary and music critic for numerous publications, including Arbetarbladet, Elanto, Suomen Sosialidemokraatti, Nya Argus, and the Malmö-based Arbetet. He was a board member of the Society of Swedish Authors in Finland from 1927, and served as its vice-chairman between 1937 and 1944. He mainly lived in Tuomistonoja of the Röykkä village.

Diktonius died in Kauniainen, and is buried in the Hietaniemi Cemetery in Helsinki.

== Private life ==
Dikotnius was the son of August Viktor Diktonius and Adelaide Maria Rosalie Malmström. He was married twice; first to Meri Rigmor Marttinen from 1923 until their divorce in 1926, and second to Anna-Leena Jäykkä from 1929.

== Awards and honors ==
- Lybeck Prize (1929, 1933)
- State Prize for Literature (1930, 1938, 1942, 1943)
- Swedish Literature Society in Finland Prize (1939, 1956)
- Tollander Prize (1943)
- Honorary member of the Swedish Literature Society in Finland (1956)

== Publications ==
=== Original works ===
- Min dikt (poems, 1921)
- Hårda sånger (poems, 1922)
- Brödet och elden (1923)
- Taggiga lågor (poems, 1924)
- Onnela (prose, 1925)
- Stenkol (poems, 1927)
- Ingenting och andra novellistiska skisser (prose fiction, 1928)
- Stark men mörk (poems, 1930)
- Janne Kubik (novel, 1932)
- Opus 12. Musik (essays, 1933)
- Mull och moln (prose and poetry, 1934)
- Medborgare i republiken Finland (short stories, 1935)
- Gräs och granit (selected poems, 1936)
- Jordisk ömhet (poems, 1938)
- Medborgare. Andra samlingen (short stories, 1940)
- Varsel (poems, 1942)
- Höstlig bastu (prose, 1943)
- Hård början (poems, 1946)
- Annorlunda (poems, 1948)
- Novembervår (poems, 1951)
- Dikter 1912—1942 (collected poems, 1955)
- Prosa 1925—1943 (collected prose, 1955)
- Meningar (aphorisms and essays, 1957)
- Agneta Rahikainen; Marit Lindqvist; Maria Antas (2000). Gudsöga, djävulstagg : Diktoniusstudier / utgivna av Agneta Rahikainen, Marit Lindqvist och Maria Antas. Skrifter / utgivna av Svenska litteratursällskapet i Finland, 0039-6842; 619 (in Swedish). Helsinki: Society of Swedish Literature in Finland. ISBN 951-583-051-6. ISSN 0039-6842. Wikidata Q113529970.

=== Translations by Diktonius ===
- Ungt hav (poetry in translation, 1923)
- Lyriskt urval by Eino Leino (1931)
- Dikter i urval by Carl Sandburg (with Artur Lundkvist and Erik Blomberg, 1934)
- Karu nuoruus (Swedish: Stark barndom) by Jan Fridegård (into Finnish, 1943)
- Sju bröder (Finnish: Seitsemän veljestä) by Aleksis Kivi (1948)

=== As editor ===
- Finland berättar. Trettio noveller (with Lauri Viljanen, 1943)
