= Hagar Olsson =

Finnish writer (1893–1978)

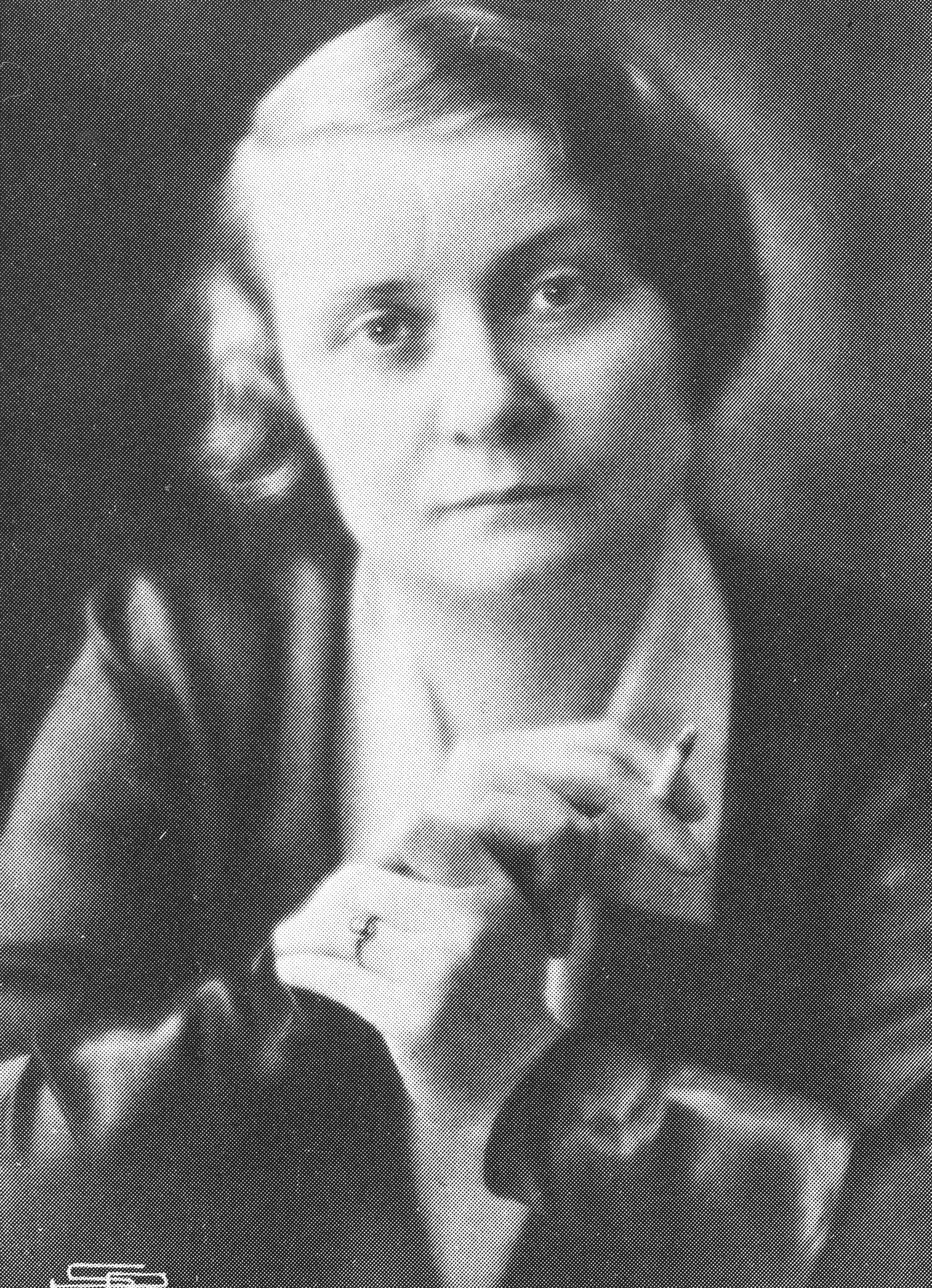
- Born: 16 September 1893; Kustavi, Grand Duchy of Finland, Russian Empire
- Died: 21 February 1978 (aged 84); Helsinki, Finland
- Occupations: Writer, literary critic, translator
- Writing career
- Literary movement: Modernism

Alli Hagar Olsson (16 September 1893 – 21 February 1978) was a Finland-Swedish writer, literary critic, playwright and translator.

Olsson was born in Kustavi to Karl Sixtus Olsson and Anna Erika Holmberg. She attended The Women's School in Viborg, graduating in 1913. She pursued further studies at the Hanken School of Economics in Helsinki from 1913 to 1914 and also studied at the University of Helsinki.

In 1922, she edited an avant-garde literary magazine, Ultra. She also contributed to another avant-garde magazine Quosego.

Olsson received several awards throughout her career, including the SLS Prize in 1929, the State Literature Prize in 1933, 1940, 1949, and 1961, the Granberg Prize in 1929, 1931, and 1936, and the Tollanderska Prize in 1950. In 1965, she was awarded the Eino Leino Prize. She was also honored with an honorary doctorate from the University of Helsinki in 1969.

She died, aged 84, in Helsinki.

== Works ==
- Lars Thorman och döden (1916)
- Själarnas ansikten (1917)
- Kvinnan och nåden (1919)
- Ny generation (1925)
- Mr Jeremias söker en illusion (1926)
- Hjärtats pantomim (1928)
- S.O.S. (Save our souls) (1928)
- På Kanaanexpressen (1929)
- Det blåser upp till storm (1930)
- Det blåa undret (1932)
- Chitambo (1933)
- Arbetare i natten (1935)
- Träsnidaren och döden (1940)
- Rövaren och jungfrun (1944)
- Hurskaat herjaajat (1946)
- Jag lever (1948)
- Kinesisk utflykt (1949)
- Kärlekens död (1952)
- Tidiga fanfarer och annan dagskritik (1953)
- Lumisota (1939)
- Hemkomst (1961)
- Tidig dramatik (1962)
- Möte med kära gestalter (1963)
- Tidig prosa (1963)
- Drömmar (1966)
- Ridturen och andra berättelser (1968)
