= Rabbe Enckell =

Finnish writer and poet (1903–1974)

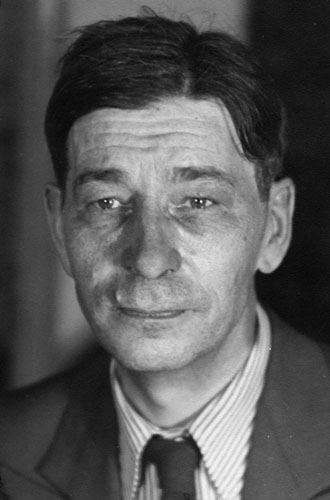
- Born: Rabbe Arnfinn Enckell; 3 March 1903; Tammela, Finland
- Died: 17 June 1974 (aged 71); Helsinki, Finland

Rabbe Arnfinn Enckell (3 March 1903 – 17 June 1974) was a Finland-Swedish writer and poet. Enckell is regarded as one of the stalwarts of the Finland-Swedish poetic revival that began in the 1920s.

Enckell was born in Tammela, Kanta-Häme, to the journalist and agriculturist Karl Enckell and Vesta Charlotta Edgren. He was born into the Finnish cultural Enckell family, which traces its origins to Germany. Enckell graduated from the secondary school Svenska normallyceum in 1921 and then studied art history at the University of Helsinki. He also studied art in France and Italy.

In 1923 he brought out his first poetry collection, entitled Dikter. It was a collection of impressionistic nature poems. The collection and its sequel, Flöjtblåsarlycka (The Flutist’s Happiness), which was published in 1925, were contained Enckell's vivid description of the changes in nature. Enckell was a modernist. For a year in 1928-29 he worked for the avant-garde journal Quosego. He then wrote a couple of semi-autobiographical novels, which included Ljusdunkel (1930). He returned to poetry with the publication of The Cistern of Spring (1931). He followed it with The Sounding Board (1935). The modernist streak in his poetry prompted comparisons with T. S. Eliot. Enckell brought out another collection of poems, The Vault, which was published in 1937. He died in Helsinki, aged 71.

== Works ==
- Dikter (Poems, poems, 1923)
- Flöjtblåsarlyckan (Flautist's Luck, poems, 1925)
- Tillblivelse (Genesis, short stories, 1929)
- Ljusdunkel (short stories, 1930),
- Ett porträtt (A Portrait, short stories, 1931)
- Vårens cistern (The Cistern of Spring, poems, 1931)
- Landskapet med den dubbla skuggan (The Landscape with Double Shadows, poems, 1933)
- Tonbrädet (poems, 1935)
- Herrar till natt och dag (short stories, 1937).
- Lutad över brunnen (Learning over the Well, poems, 1942)
- Andedräkt av koppar (Breath of Copper, poems, 1947),
- Sett och återbördat (1950)
- Essay om livets framfart (An Essay about the Ravages of Life, a collection of essays, 1961)
- Det är dags (1965)
- Flyende spegel (1974)
