= Skrifter utgivna av Svenska litteratursällskapet i Finland =

Book series published by SLS

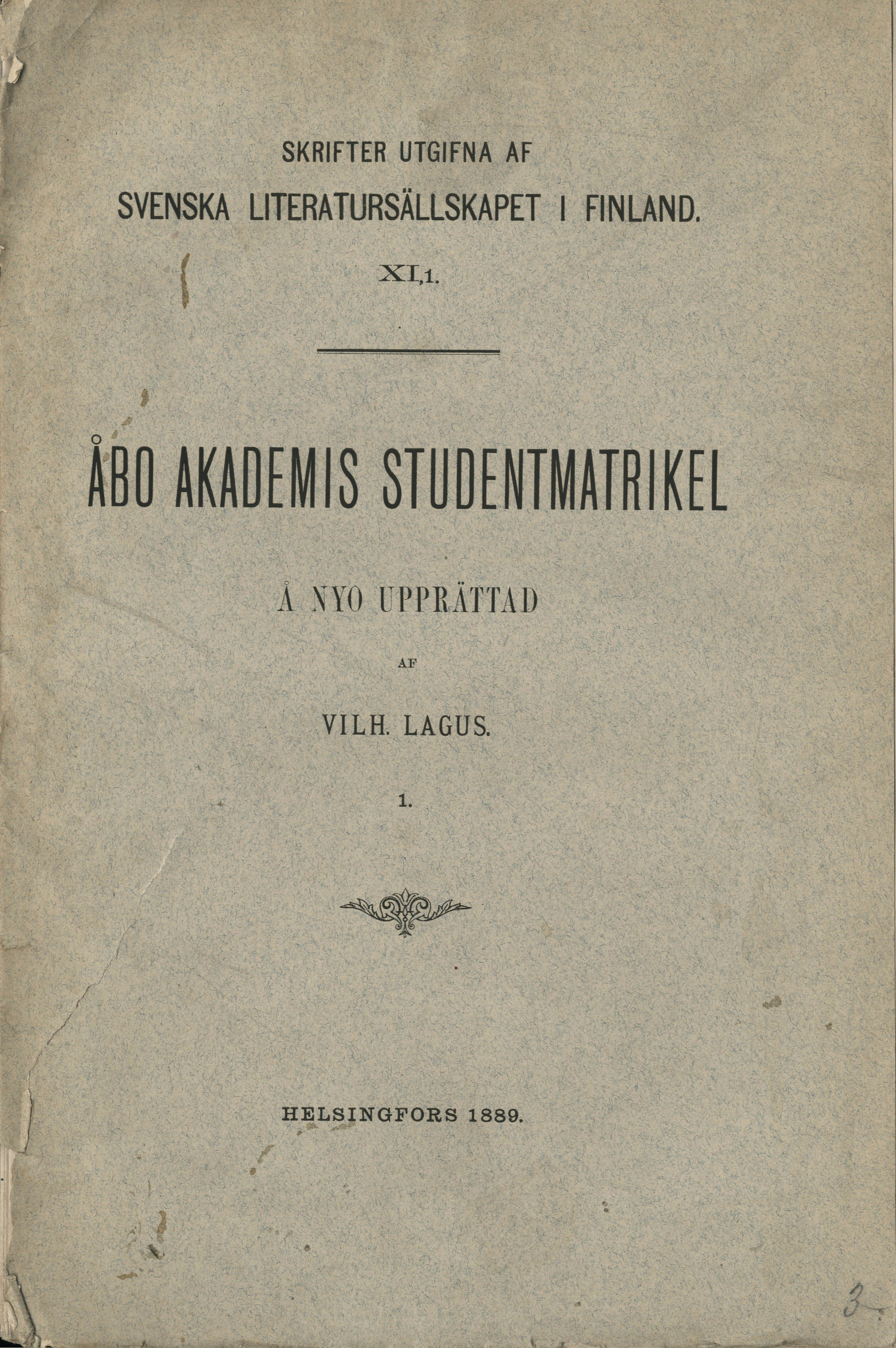

Skrifter utgivna av Svenska litteratursällskapet i Finland (lit. 'Writing published by the Society of Swedish Literature in Finland'; SSLS) is a book series in Swedish, published in Finland since 1886 by the Society of Swedish Literature in Finland (SLS). The main series reached number 734 in the year 2010. The series has several sub-series with own themes and numbering. Several of the publications have been digitised and made freely available by the National Library of Finland.

According to SLS's publishing policy, the works are reviewed according to the international scientific community's qualitative and ethical critiera. Alongside the main series, SLS also publishes the series SLS Varia since 2018, which is reviewed according to SLS's own internal criteria.

== Sub-series and themes ==
Some of the official sub-series and themes are:

- Biografiskt lexikon för Finland, 2008–2011, 4. Biographies.
- Finlands svenska folkdiktning, 1917–1975, 8, on Finland Swedes.
- Folklivsstudier (Folk life studies), 1945–, on ethnology, folklore studies and Finland Swedes.
- Folkloristiska och etnografiska studier (Folkloristic and ethnographic studies), 1916–, on ethnology, folklore studies and Finland Swedes.
- Förhandlingar och uppsatser, 1886–1951, 26, on matters of the Society of Swedish Literature in Finland.
- Historiska och litteraturhistoriska studier (Historical and literary studies), 1925–, on Finland-Swedish literature and history of Finland.
- Levnadsteckningar (Biographies), 1955–. Biographies of e.g. Hugo Pipping, Emma Irene Åström and Carl Axel Nordman.
- Samlade skrifter av Johan Ludvig Runeberg (Collected writings of Johan Ludvig Runeberg), 1933–, on Johan Ludvig Runeberg's life, work and impact.
- Släktbok (Family book) 1912–. Describes families, e.g. Appelberg, Federley, Hartwall, Roos, Sohlberg, Tallqvist, Wegelius and Zilliacus.
- Studier i nordisk filologi (Studies in Nordic philology), 1910–, on Scandinavian studies and North Germanic languages.
- Zacharias Topelius Skrifter (Writings of Zacharias Topelius), 2010–. on Zacharias Topelius' life, work and impact.

The majority of publications are not part of a sub-series. One example is Finnish scientist Pehr Kalm's books describing his journeys to North America in the 18th century.

== Individual works ==
A sample of individual works not part of sub-series

- Biografiskt lexikon för Finland, 2008–2011 (web publication)
- Skärgårdsnamn, 1989
