= European Foundation =

European Foundation may refer to:

- European Foundation (think tank)
- European Foundation Project
