= Skärgårdsnamn =

1989 book on place names by Kurt Zilliacus

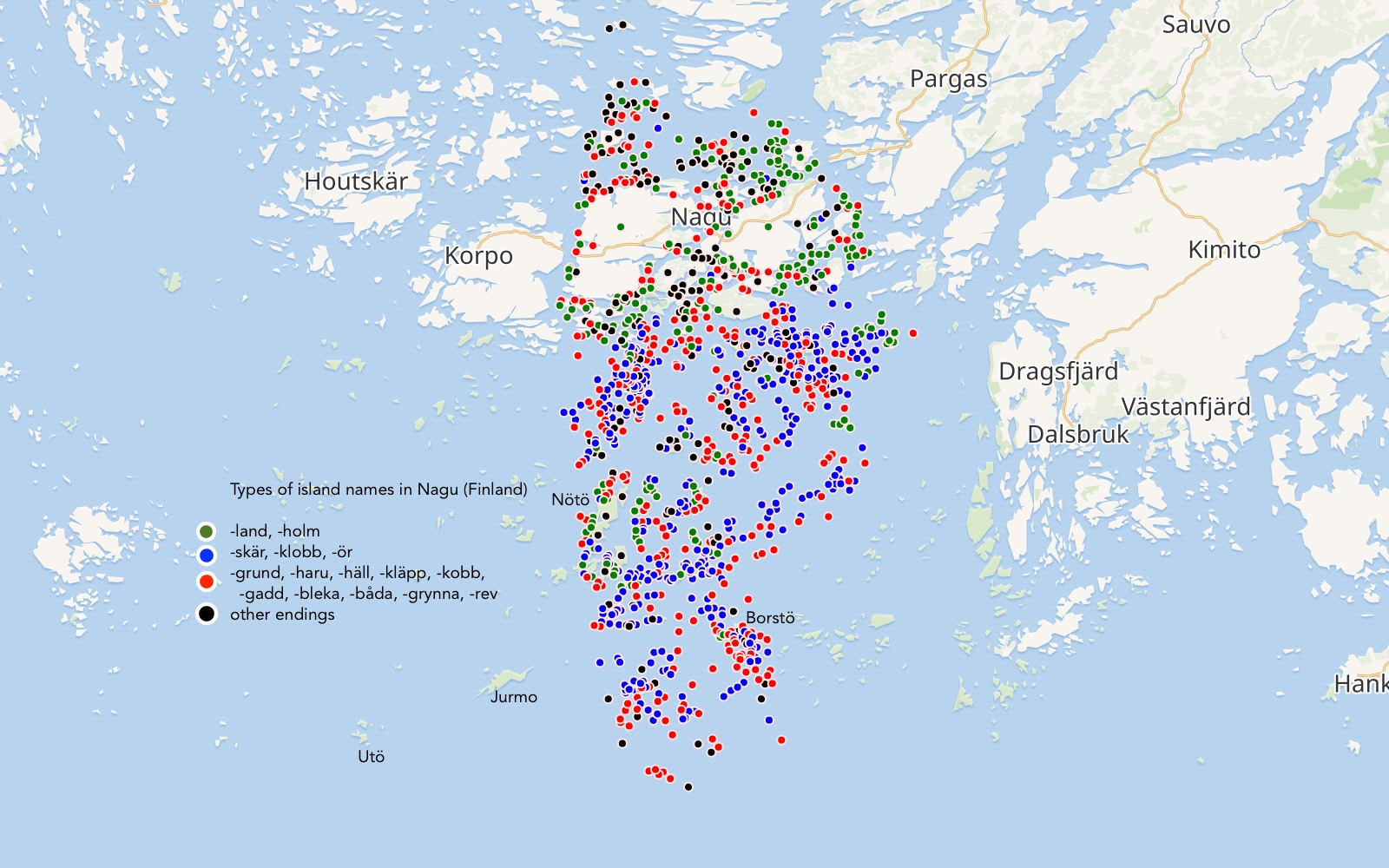
- Islands in Nagu, color coded by name suffix – -holm(en), -skär(et) etc.
- Author: Kurt Zilliacus
- Original title: Skärgårdsnamn
- Language: Swedish
- Series: Skrifter utgivna av Svenska litteratursällskapet i Finland
- Release number: 558
- Subject: Archipelago Names in Finland
- Genre: non-fiction
- Published: 1989
- Publisher: Society of Swedish Literature in Finland
- Publication place: Finland
- Pages: 264
- ISBN: 951-9018-54-9

Skärgårdsnamn (lit. Archipelago Names), is a Finnish Swedish-language book on around one hundred thousand Swedish place names in Finland's archipelagos, written by toponymy researcher Kurt Zilliacus, published in 1989.

== Description ==
The book summarizes the results of twenty years of research of place names in the archipelagos of the Baltic Sea belonging to Finland. Zilliacus led the toponymy research at the Institute for the Languages of Finland's Swedish name archive.

The research area includes Finland's large coastal archipelagos, which during recorded history mainly had a Swedish population, and their place names thus consisted mostly of Swedish names and name forms, with a few loanwords from Finnish. The book states that during eight centuries the Swedish-speaking population in the Archipelago Sea and along the coasts of Nyland and Ostrobothnia established around a hundred thousand place Swedish names that are still known and in official use.

The book provides an overview of the origin and frequency of place names. The book is divided into three main chapters: Names of islands (islands, islets, skerries, shallows, etc.), Names of land locations (headlands, bays, beaches, straits) and Culture-related names (fishing and hunting, harbors and shipping).

=== Island names ===
Zilliacus describes the typical geography for island names in size order: Around islands and islets (öar and holmar) are smaller skerries (skär, klobbar and örar), that are surrounded by rocks and shallows (grund, harur, hällar, kläppar, kobbar and blekor, bådar, grynnor and rev).

For islands and shallows alone there are over 50 place name suffixes. The most usual suffix types are -ö (thousands in Finland's achipelago), -holm (islet, over 5500), -skär (skerry, 4000), -hara (550), -klobb (1300), -ör (3300), -både (1200), -grund (7000), -hälla (900), -kläpp (1200), -kobbe (1300), -grynna (1300), -rev (reef, 450) and -sten (stone, 650). Loan-names from Finnish are -saari/-sar (hundreds), -luoto/-lot (180), and -kari (hundreds).

Although the names often reflect the character of the islands, they are not always correct due to factors such as the impact of tectonic uplift on the sea level. What had been an island in the 19th century was perhaps a collection of rocks 500 years earlier. A Hufvudstadsbladet article states that there are islands with the suffix -skär (skerry) that are large and forested, while other are barren and rocky, and thus better fit the meaning of skär as per Svenska Akademiens ordbok, the Swedish-language dictionary.
