= Salt Lake, Hawaii =

Neighborhood of Honolulu, Hawaii, United States

Salt Lake
- Neighborhood
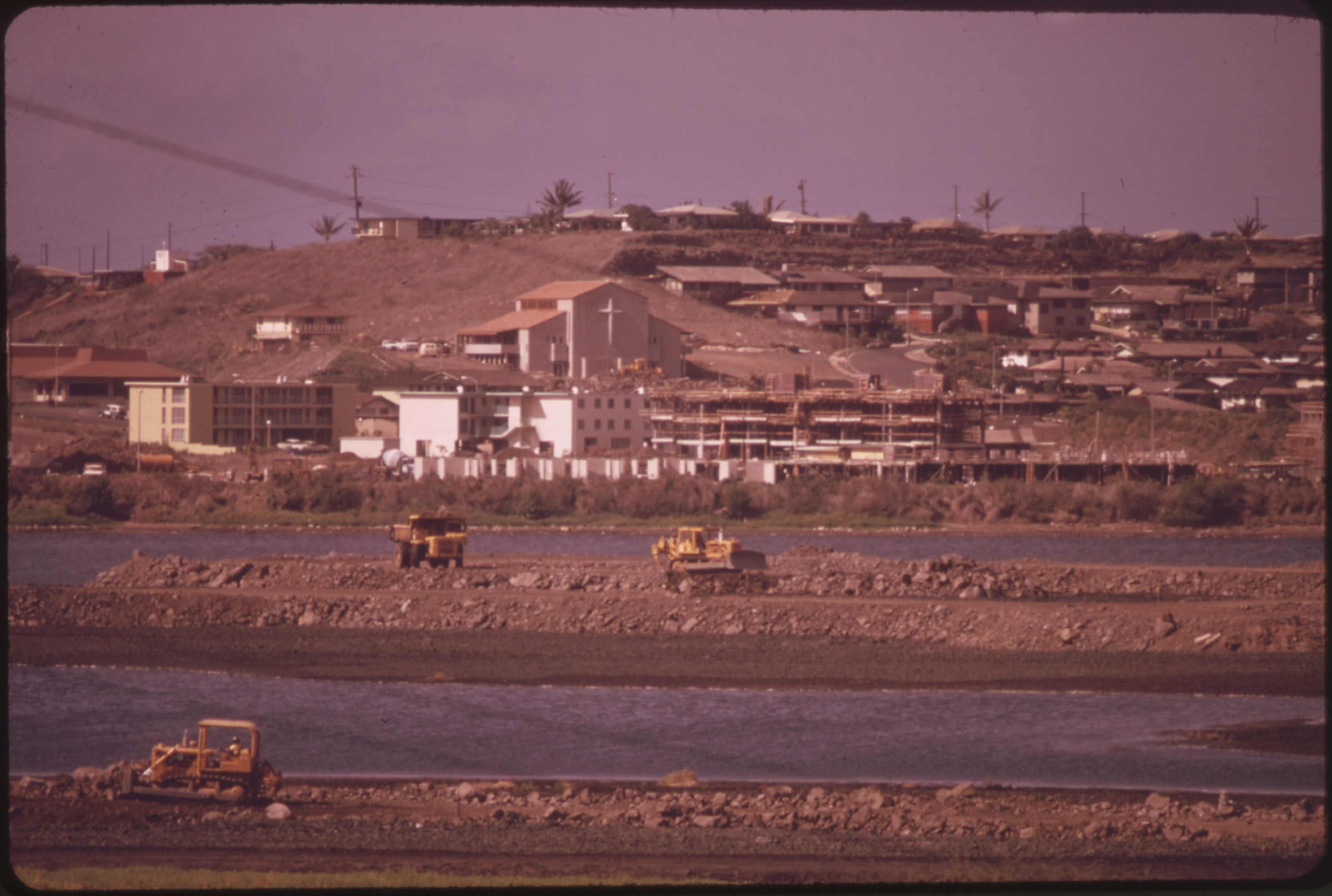
- Salt Lake while in development
- Interactive map of Salt Lake
- Location within Hawaii
- Coordinates: 21°21′18″N 157°54′28″W
- Country: United States
- State: Hawaii
- Established: 1960s
- Postal code: 96818

Salt Lake, also known as Āliamanu after a nearby crater, or Āliapa‘akai ("salt shallow" in Hawaiian), is a neighborhood of Honolulu, Hawaii on the island of O‘ahu. The Salt Lake community was developed in the 1960s during a construction boom, providing residents with an expansive view of downtown Honolulu and the sugarcane plantations of the central plain of O‘ahu. It is a community of high-rise condominiums, mid-rise town-dwellings, and houses snaking around the remnants of a now freshwater lake.

The U.S. Postal Code for Salt Lake is 96818. Salt Lake is a part of the 15th District of the Hawaii Senate, currently represented by State Senator Glenn Wakai and the 32nd District of the Hawaii House of Representatives, currently represented by Linda Ichiyama. It is also a part of Council District VII of the City and County of Honolulu, currently represented by Radiant Cordero.

== Geography and history ==
The Salt Lake community is built in the larger and easternmost of three overlapping, low profile, tuff cones or volcanic craters: Makalapa, Āliamanu and Āliapa‘akai. A lake, at one time 1.5 km across (20 ha) but very shallow, formed in the bowl of Āliapa‘akai fed by freshwater springs or possibly seawater seepages (Alexander, 1926 in Maciolek, 1982). Because the lake had no outlet, water loss was largely by evaporation, concentrating salts. The lake was regularly so salty that salt deposits formed around the shore, hence the name "Āliapa‘akai" from ālia paʻa kai or "sea encrusting shallows". Natives extracted these deposits to their advantage for personal consumption, and later for trade to Euro-American fur traders who procured the salt as a needed item in preserving their sea otter pelts.

In 1910, an artesian well was dug to bring the water level higher (and salt content lower) for use as a mullet fish pond; a tunnel, dug through the southeast rim of the crater, controlled the water level and provided an outlet (Macdonald, Abbott, and Peterson. 1983). This act, and later construction of a larger drainage outlet, eventually removed the salt from Salt Lake.

An ahupuaʻa in ancient Hawaii was a land division that stretched from a mountain to the sea. The area called Moanalua eventually became the property of the estate of Samuel M. Damon. Before him, it belonged to the House of Kamehameha. Damon was involved with the Provisional Government of Hawaii that took power after the overthrow of the Kingdom of Hawaii and abdication of Queen Liliʻuokalani. Damon later became one of the first trustees of the Kamehameha Schools with his business partner philanthropist Charles Reed Bishop. The Damon estate sold some of the land to commercial and residential developers in 1956. After statehood, Governor of Hawaii John A. Burns promoted the development as a modernization project. In 1966 the lake was filled in except for a pond in the Honolulu Country Club golf course at 21°21′18″N 157°54′28″W.

=== Roadways ===
Salt Lake's growth was mainly attributed to the ease (in those days) with which residents could travel to and from downtown Honolulu and Waikīkī, where many worked. Salt Lake's main street is Salt Lake Boulevard, running the length of the community, from Moanalua High School to Aloha Stadium, connecting Puuloa Road (Hawaii Route 66) and Kamehameha Highway (Hawaii Route 99). Its major arteries are Ala Ilima Street, Likini Street, Ala Lilikoi Street and Ala Napunani Street. Most of Salt Lake's residential streets are named after native flora and fauna. For example, the ‘ilima is the official flower of the City & County of Honolulu.

Highways and freeways passing close by Salt Lake include the Queen Lili'uokalani Freeway (no exits or entrances), Moanalua Freeway (Exit 2 – Ala Napunani; Exit 3 – Puuloa

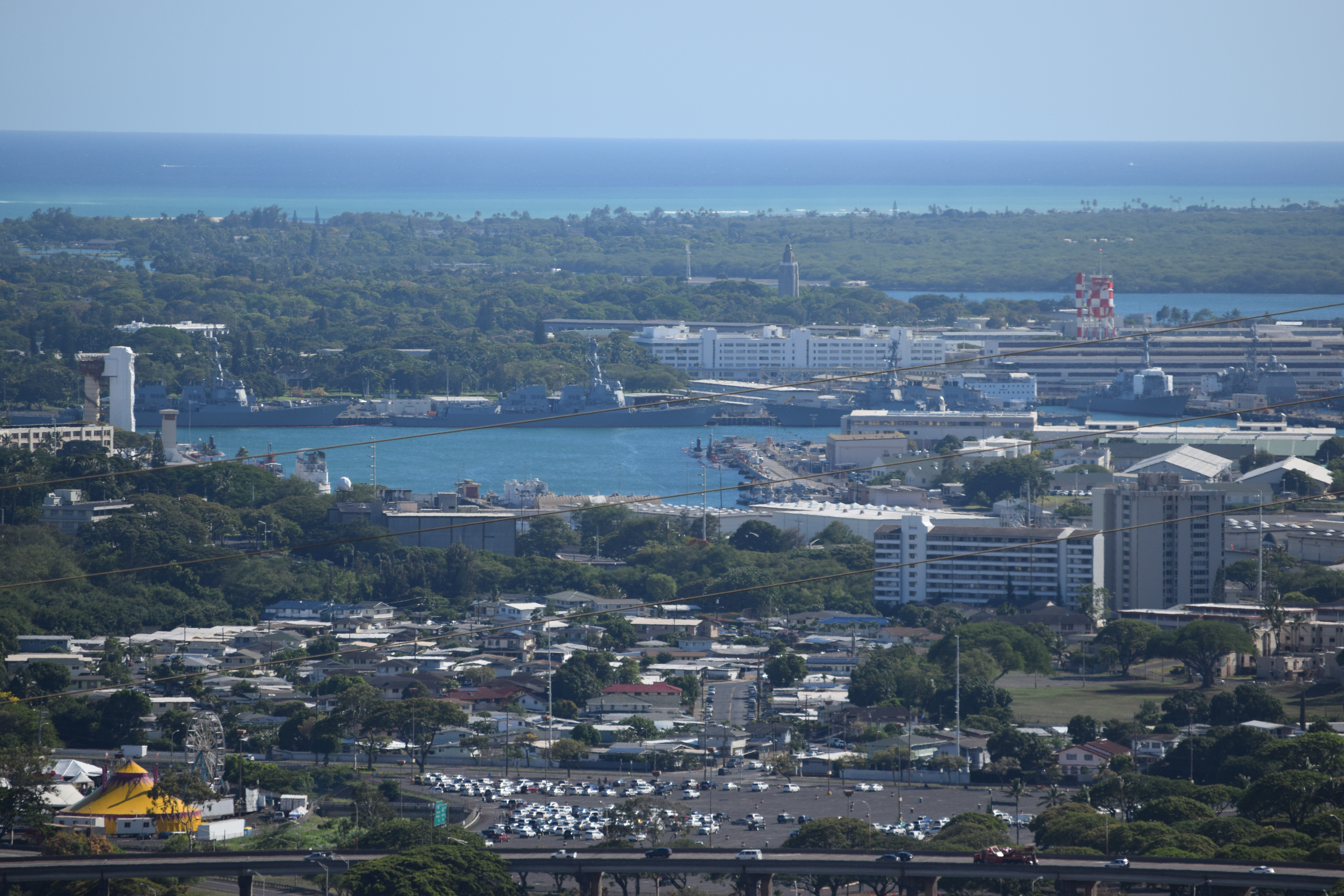
Salt Lake is home to officers of the military and their families. The community is surrounded by various military installations including the headquarters of the United States Indo-Pacific Command.

Road), and Nimitz Highway (State Route 92).

=== Military ===
Salt Lake is almost surrounded by military installations. Nearby Fort Shafter is the headquarters of the United States Army Pacific. Hickam Air Force Base is headquarters of the United States Pacific Air Forces. Pearl Harbor is headquarters of the United States Pacific Fleet. United States Indo-Pacific Command is to the north of Salt Lake at Camp H. M. Smith. Tripler Army Medical Center, visible on the heights to the northeast, is the principal U.S. military medical facility for Asia and the Pacific Basin. Coast Artillery Battery Tiernon, which mounted 2 X 3" guns, was located at Salt Lake for the protection of Pearl Harbor.

=== Airport ===
Although not regarded as part of Salt Lake, the Honolulu International Airport is very close, just to the south. The area surrounding the airport is often referred to as the airport district, a commercial and retail region built up along Nimitz Highway. Located there are office buildings, the main United States Postal Service center in the state, and Ke'ehi Lagoon.

== Community ==
A 2003 special feature of the Honolulu Star-Bulletin classified Salt Lake as affluent upper-middle class with equal distribution of European Americans and second and third generations of Filipino Americans and Japanese Americans. Korean American families have also been making their presence known most recently. There are under 30,000 people living in Salt Lake. Based on surveys compiled by the University of Hawaiʻi, residents are composed of mostly Honolulu professionals and military officers choosing to live off base. The neighborhood community is home to the families of officers and enlisted servicemen from the Air Force, Army, Coast Guard and Navy.

According to the 2000 report of the United States Census Bureau, Salt Lake ranked eighth of all the neighborhood communities in Hawai‘i in terms of median annual household income. It ranked second in median home values, then $875,000. Waikīkī was highest.

=== Education ===
Moanalua High School was opened in 1972 in the newly developed community. It was dubbed by The Honolulu Advertiser as the Private School of Public Schools. This compares it to ʻIolani School and Punahou School. Also serving the community are Radford High School, Aliamanu Elementary School and Aliamanu Middle School, formerly known as Aliamanu Intermediate School until 1997. Salt Lake Elementary School hugs the slopes of the Aliamanu crater. There are two schools serving the Roman Catholic Diocese of Honolulu, Holy Family Catholic Academy and the Saint Philomena Early Learning Center at Saint Philomena Church.

=== Commercial center ===
The commercial center of Salt Lake is Salt Lake Shopping Center, bound by Ala Ilima Street, Ala Lilikoi Street and Salt Lake Boulevard. Its anchor tenants are a Safeway grocery store, a Longs Drugs store and the only McDonald's in the region. In the 1980s, Mayor of Honolulu Frank Fasi established a mobile satellite city hall at Salt Lake Shopping Center to provide city services for residents without having to travel into City Hall. Salt Lake Shopping Center at one time was home to the Salt Lake Moanalua branch of the Hawaii State Public Library System until it moved to the campus of Aliamanu Elementary and Middle Schools.

=== Parks ===
Salt Lake is considered a green neighborhood community, endowed with large stretches of park lands. The largest of the parks is Salt Lake District Park renovated in 2003. The park has hiking trails around the slopes of Āliamanu and Āliapa‘akai craters. Salt Lake District Park has playing fields, basketball and tennis courts, multipurpose buildings and a gymnasium operated by the City & County of Honolulu. A 50-meter swimming pool is the newest addition.

Smaller parks in the midst of high-rise condominiums include Salt Lake Municipal Park, which hosts the People's Market each Saturday morning. Established by former Mayor Frank Fasi, the People's Market allows Salt Lake residents to purchase fresh produce and fish from independent local producers. Hoa Aloha Park on Ala Ilima Street is the site of weekend soccer games.

=== Community events ===
Salt Lake is home to various public annual events:

- Menehune Classic is held in the fall, opening the competitive marching band season. One of the most important music festivals in Honolulu, various high school marching bands perform at the Moanalua High School football field showing off skill and precision. Moanalua High School is home to one of the preeminent marching bands in the state, having performed throughout the world.
- Winter Craft Fair is held each December as entrepreneurs gather on the campus of Moanalua High School to sell their unique goods and fresh, hot food. A similar craft fair is held each spring.

== Sources ==
- Macdonald, Gordon A., Agatin T. Abbott, and Frank L. Peterson. 1983. Volcanoes in the Sea, 2nd edition. University of Hawaiʻi Press, Honolulu. 517 pages.
- Maciolek, J. A. 1983. Lakes and lake-like waters of the Hawaiian Archipelago. Occ. Papers B. P. Bishop Museum, XXV(1): pages 1–14.
