= Hannu Soikkanen =

Finnish historian (1930–2020)

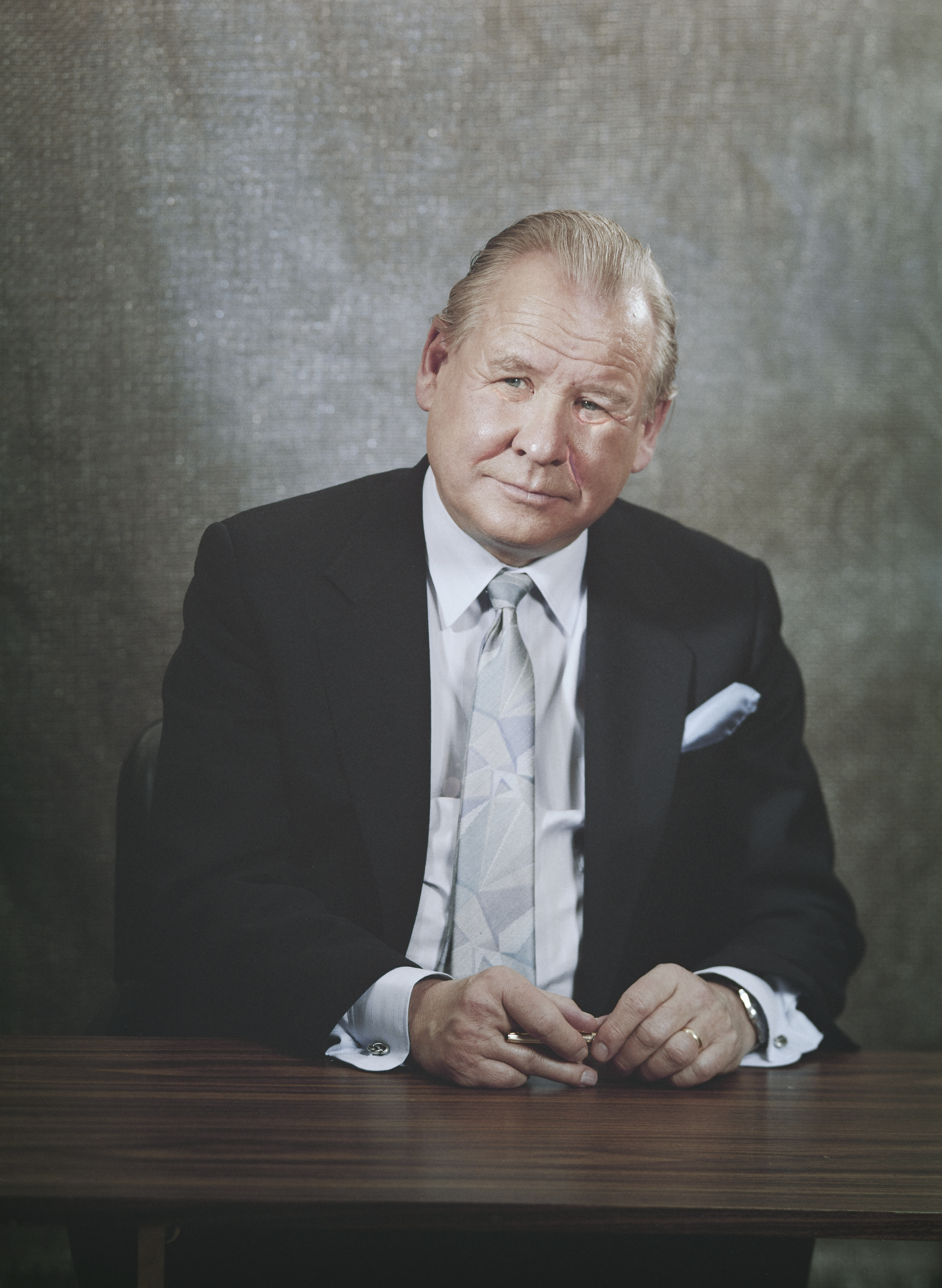
Hannu Veli Soikkanen

Hannu Veli Soikkanen (4 August 1930 – 9 May 2020) was a Finnish historian. Soikkanen was active in the study of Finland's history 1962–1966 at the University of Turku, and 1967–76 in economic and social history. Between 1976 and 1993 he was a professor in social history at Helsinki University.

== Biography ==
Hannu Veli Soikkanen was born on 4 August 1930 in Sippola. He earned his PhD in 1954, then went on to study the working class movement and the social democratic party's history, and also the communal self-governments history in Finland. Amongst his works are Sosialismin tulo Suomeen (1961), which is about the coming of socialism to Finland, Kunnallinen itsehallinto kansanvallan perusteena (1966), about the communes, Kansalaissota dokumentteina (1967–69), a selection of sources to the Finnish Civil War 1918, Luovutetun Karjalan työväenliikkeen historia (1970), about the Karelian working class movement and Kohti kansanvaltaa 1-3 (1975–1991), which treats the social democratic party's history up to 1952. He has also published local historical works such as Varkauden historia (1963) and Sulkavan historia II (2002, with Paavo Seppänen). Soikkanen died in Helsinki on 9 May 2020, at the age of 89.

== Sources ==
- Uppslagsverket Finland, 4 (2006)
