= Foundation (nonprofit) =

Type of nonprofit organization

A foundation (also referred to as a charitable foundation) is a type of nonprofit organization or charitable trust that usually provides funding and support to other charitable organizations through grants, while also potentially participating directly in charitable activities. Foundations encompass public charitable foundations, like community foundations, and private foundations, which are often endowed by an individual or family. Nevertheless, the term "foundation" might also be adopted by organizations not primarily engaged in public grantmaking.

== Description ==
Legal entities existing under the status of "foundations" have a wide diversity of structures and purposes. Nevertheless, there are some common structural elements.

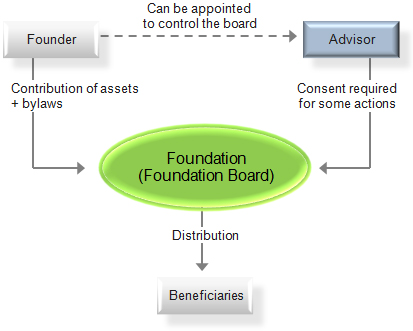
Chart of a foundation

- Legal requirements followed for establishment
- Purpose of the foundation
- Economic activity
- Accountability and auditing provisions
- Provisions for the amendment of the statutes or articles of incorporation
- Provisions for the dissolution of the entity
- Tax status of corporate and private donors
- Tax status of the foundation

Some of the above must be, in most jurisdictions, expressed in the document of establishment. Others may be provided by the supervising authority at each particular jurisdiction.

== Europe ==
There is no commonly accepted legal definition across Europe for a foundation. There was a proposal for a European Foundation Statute, a legal form that would create a legal definition recognised across all EU Member States. However, this proposal was withdrawn in 2015 following its failure to pass through COREPER 1.

== Foundations in civil law ==
The term "foundation", in general, is used to describe a distinct legal entity. Foundations as legal structures (legal entities) and/or legal persons (legal personality) may have a diversity of forms and may follow varying regulations depending on the jurisdiction where they are created. Foundations are often set up for charitable purposes, family patrimony and collective purposes which can include education or research.

In some jurisdictions, a foundation may acquire its legal personality when it is entered in a public registry, while in other countries a foundation may acquire legal personality by the mere action of creation through a required document. Unlike a company, foundations have no shareholders, though they may have a board, an assembly and voting members. A foundation may hold assets in its own name for the purposes set out in its constitutive documents, and its administration and operation are carried out in accordance with its statutes or articles of association rather than fiduciary principles. The foundation has a distinct patrimony independent of its founder.

=== Finland ===
In Finland, foundations (Finnish: säätiö, Swedish: stiftelse) are regulated by the Finnish Patent and Registration Office and have the four following characteristics:

- They are set up to manage property donated for a particular purpose.
- This purpose is determined when establishing the foundation.
- Foundations have neither owners, shareholders, nor members.
- A board of trustees ensures that the foundation operates appropriately, and is responsible for ensuring that the investments by the foundation are secure and profitable.

Foundations are considered legal persons in Finland. The Foundations Act in 2015 dramatically updated the laws regarding foundations.

=== France ===
There are not many foundations in comparison to the rest of Europe. In practice public administration requires at least €1 million necessary. State representatives have a mandatory seat in the board.

=== Germany ===
German regulations allow the creation of any foundation for public or private purposes in keeping with the concept of a gemeinwohlkonforme Allzweckstiftung ("general-purpose foundation compatible with the common good"). A foundation should not have commercial activities as its main purpose, but they are permitted if they serve the main purpose of the foundation. There is no minimum starting capital, although in practice at least €50,000 is considered necessary.

A German foundation can either be charitable or serve a private interest. Charitable foundations enjoy tax exemptions. If they engage in commercial activities, only the commercially active part of the entity is taxed. A family foundation serving private interests is taxed like any other legal entity. There is no central register for German foundations.

Only charitable foundations are subject to supervision by state authorities. Family foundations are not supervised after establishment. All forms of foundations can be dissolved, however, if they pursue anti-constitutional aims. Foundations are supervised by local authorities within each state (Bundesland) because each state has exclusive legislative power over the laws governing foundations.

In contrast to many other countries, German law allows a tax-sheltered charitable foundation to distribute up to one-third of its profit to the founder and his next of kin, if they are needy, or to maintain the founder's grave. These benefits are subject to taxation.

As of 2008, there are about 15,000 foundations in Germany, about 85% of them charitable foundations. More than 250 charitable German foundations have existed for more than 500 years; the oldest dates back to 1509. There are also large German corporations owned by foundations, including Bertelsmann, Bosch, Carl Zeiss AG and Lidl. Foundations are the main providers of private scholarships to German students.

=== Italy ===
In Italy, a foundation is a private non-profit and autonomous organization, its assets must be dedicated to a purpose established by the founder. The founder cannot receive any benefits from the foundation or have reverted the initial assets. The private foundations or civil code foundations are under the section about non commercial entities of the first book of the Civil Code of Law of 1942. Article 16 CC establishes that the foundation's statutes must contain its name, purpose, assets, domicile, administrative organs and regulations, and how the grants will be distributed. The founder must write a declaration of intention including a purpose and endow assets for such purpose. This document can be in the form of a notarized deed or a will. To obtain legal personality, the foundation must enroll in the legal register of each prefettura (local authority) or some cases the regional authority. There are several nuances in requirements according to each foundation's purpose and area of activity.

=== Netherlands ===
Non-profit foundations are termed as stichting in the Netherlands which are regulated by Dutch law.

=== Portugal ===
A foundation (Fundação) in Portugal is regulated by Law 150/2015, with the exception of religious foundations, which are regulated by the Religious Freedom Law. Foundations may be private, wholly public (created and managed exclusively by public bodies), or public but with private management (created by public entities and optionally also private entities, but whose management is dominated by private entities). Foundations may only be operational after being recognized by the Prime Minister of Portugal.

Foundations must designate and pursue at least one of twenty-five public benefit goals defined by law. They must also have enough assets to pursue those goals. They may not benefit the founders or any other restricted group, but the general public.

Portuguese foundations may voluntarily associate themselves via the Portuguese Foundation Centre (CPF – Centro Português de Fundações), that was founded in 1993 by the Eng. António de Almeida Foundation, the Calouste Gulbenkian Foundation and the Oriente Foundation.

=== Spain ===
Foundations in Spain are organizations founded with the purpose of not seeking profit and serving the general needs of the public. Such foundations may be founded by private individuals or by the public. These foundations have an independent legal personality separate from their founders. Foundations serve the general needs of the public with a patrimony that funds public services and may not be distributed to the founders' benefit.

=== Sweden ===
A foundation in Sweden (Swedish: stiftelse) is a legal entity without an owner. It is formed by a letter of donation from a founder donating funds or assets to be administered for a specific purpose. When the purpose is for the public benefit, a foundation may enjoy favorable tax treatment. A foundation may have diverse purposes, including but not limited to public benefit, humanitarian or cultural purposes, religious, collective, familiar, or the simple passive administration of funds. Normally, the supervision of a foundation is done by the county government where the foundation has its domicile, however, large foundations must be registered by the county administrative board (CAB), which must also supervise the administration of the foundation. The main legal instruments governing foundations in Sweden are the Foundation Act (1994:1220) and the Regulation for Foundations (1995:1280).

=== Switzerland ===
A foundation needs to be registered with the company register.

== Foundations in common law ==
=== Canada ===
Under Canadian law, registered charities may be designated as charitable organizations, public foundations, or private foundations. The designation depends on factors such as the charity's structure, funding sources, and mode of operation. Charities receive notification of their designation from the Canada Revenue Agency (CRA) upon registration. A charity with only one director or trustee is automatically designated as a private foundation. To be designated as a charitable organization or public foundation, more than half of the directors, trustees, or officials must be at arm's length. The CRA applies specific criteria to determine the designation, including the charity's purposes, activities, income allocation, and relationships with officials and donors.

=== Ireland ===
The law does not prescribe any particular form for a foundation in Ireland. Most commonly, foundations are companies limited by guarantees or trusts. A foundation can obtain a charity registration number from the Revenue Commissioners for obtaining tax relief as far as they can be considered under the law on charity, however, charitable status does not exist in Ireland. The definition usually applied is that from the Pemsel Case of English jurisprudence (1891) and the Irish Income Tax Act 1967. Trusts have no legal personality and companies acquire their legal status through the Company law and the required documents of incorporation. Foundations are not required to register with any public authority.

=== United Kingdom ===
In the UK, the word "foundation" is sometimes used in the title of a charity, as in the British Heart Foundation and the Fairtrade Foundation. Despite this, the term is not generally used in English law, and (unlike in civil law systems) the term has no precise meaning. Instead, the concept of charitable trust is in use (for example, the Wellcome Trust).

The States of Jersey are considering introducing civil law type foundations into its law. A consultation paper presenting a general discussion on foundations was brought forth to the Jersey government concerning this possibility. It was adopted by the states of Jersey on 22 October 2008 through the Foundations (Jersey) Law 200.

=== United States ===
In the United States, many philanthropic and charitable organizations (such as the Bill & Melinda Gates Foundation) are considered to be foundations. However, the Internal Revenue Code distinguishes between private foundations (usually endowed by an individual, family, or corporation) and public charities (community foundations or other nonprofit groups that raise money from the general public). While they offer donors more control over their charitable giving, private foundations have more restrictions and fewer tax benefits than public charities.

== International networks ==
At an international level there are a series of networks and associations of foundations, among them Council on Foundations, EFC (European Foundation Centre), WINGS (Worldwide Initiatives for Grantmaker Support). Those organization also have a role in supporting research on foundations.

== See also ==
- Wikipedia articles on individual foundations
- Private foundation
- Benefit corporation
- Charitable trust
- Community organization
- Community organizing
- Financial endowment
- International nongovernmental organization
- List of charitable foundations
- List of wealthiest charitable foundations
- Nongovernmental organization
- Program evaluation
- Think tank

== Further listening ==
- Joan Roelofs, The Invisible Hand of Corporate Capitalism, Recorded at Hampshire College, April 18, 2007.
