= Maria Sohlberg =

Swedish composer

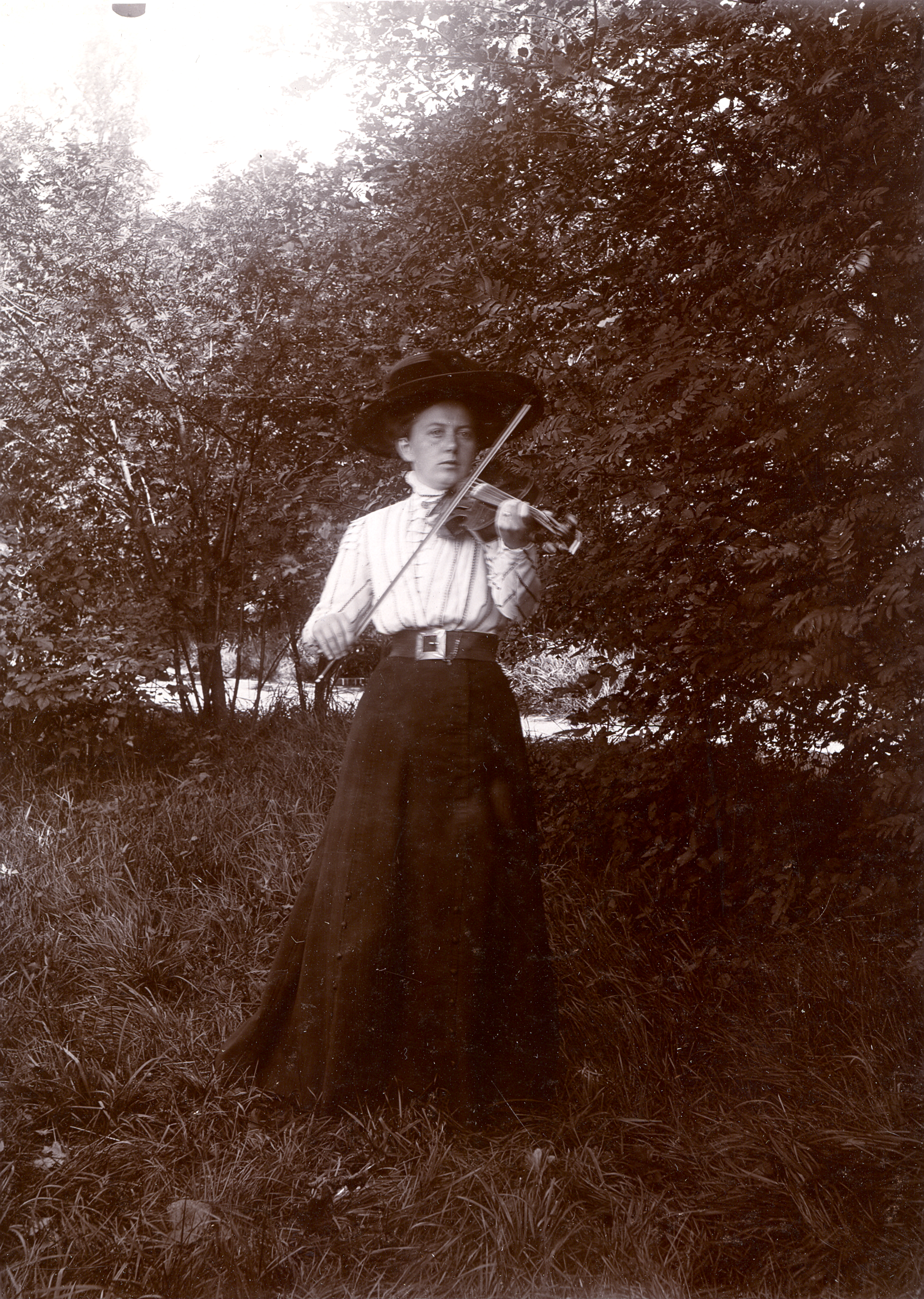
Maria Sohlberg - SMV - MM 0621

Maria Sohlberg (1886–1973), was a Swedish spelman, fiddler and composer.

Sohlberg was one of few female spelman-musicians, a traditional form of music which was rarely played by women.

Sohlberg was one of only two women of 67 spelman delegates at the first Congress of Spelman in Sweden, Riksspelmansstämma, in Stockholm in 1910, and the only woman spelman who played the fiddle.

Maria Sohlberg also composed her own compositions, and fifteen of her songs are preserved.
