= Soderman =

Soderman may refer to:

- Randy Soderman (born 1974), American retired soccer player, brother of Rick Soderman
- Rick Soderman (born 1970), American retired soccer player
- William A. Soderman (1912–1980), United States Army soldier awarded the Medal of Honor
  - USNS Soderman (T-AKR-299), a United States Navy cargo ship named after the soldier
  - USNS Soderman (T-AKR-317), a United States Navy cargo ship named after the soldier
- Söderman, a Swedish surname, including a list of people
