= Āliamanu Crater =

Volcanic tuff cone

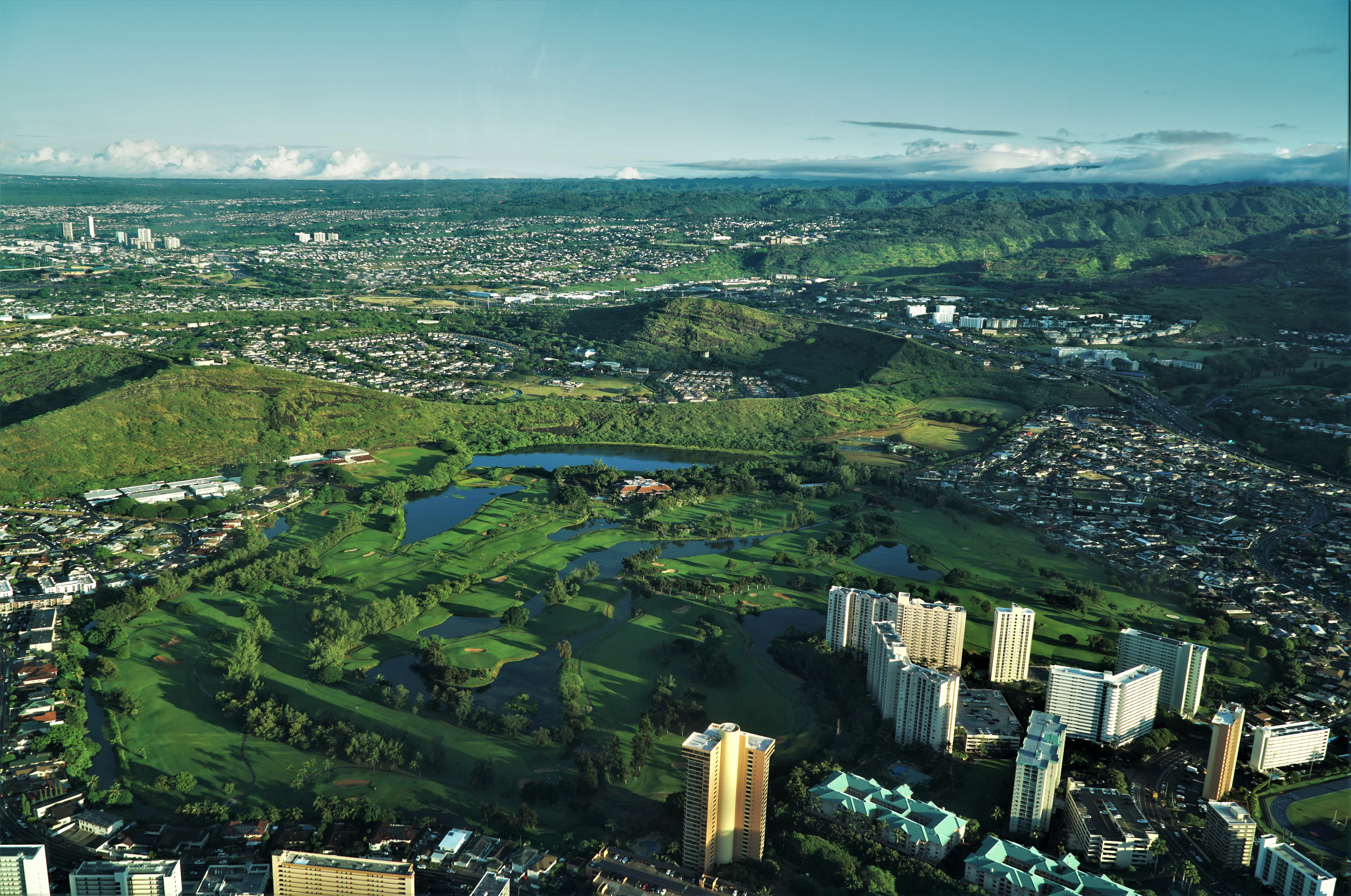
- Aerial view of Salt Lake (Āliapa‘akai) with Āliamanu Crater directly above

Highest point
- Elevation: 760 ft (230 m)
- Coordinates: 21°21′42″N 157°54′54″W

Geography
- Location within Hawaii
- Location: Salt Lake, Hawaii, United States
- Parent range: Hawaiian Islands

Geology
- Mountain type: Tuff cone
- Volcanic arc: Hawaiian-Emperor seamount chain

Āliamanu Crater (from Hawaiian: ālia manu "bird shallow" or "bird pond"), also known as Leilono Crater or North Crater, is a volcanic tuff cone in the Salt Lake neighborhood of Honolulu, Hawaii.

It has an elevation of 760 feet, towering the nearby Āliapa‘akai and Makalapa craters.

== History ==
The first geological description of Aliamanu was done by 19th century geologist James Dwight Dana.

In the early 20th century, the US military constructed a military base within the crater now known as the Aliamanu Military Reserve. The area was also used for underground ammunition storage.

== Geology ==
Āliamanu was one of the many tuff craters formed during the Honolulu Volcanics, a series of eruptions in southeastern Oahu.

== Legends ==
The Ancient hawaiians believed the upper rim of Aliamanu crater to be the location of Leilono, a site said to contain the entrance to the otherworld (Pō).

Legends also record the Hawaiian goddesses Pele and Hiʻiaka using the crater as a habitat.
