= Schildts =

Finnish book publisher

Schildts Förlags Ab
- Founder: Holger Schildt
- Successor: Schildts & Söderströms
- Country of origin: Finland

Schildts Förlags Ab (Note: Not to be confused with Bohlin & Co, which after 1928 was called Holger Schildts Förlags AB.) was a Finland-Swedish book publisher in Finland. The publisher published textbooks as well as fiction and non-fiction. The head office was in Helsingfors (Finnish: Helsinki) and there was a branch located in Vasa (Vaasa). The publisher was owned by Svenska Folkskolans Vänner. On 1 February 2012, Schildts and the other significant Finland-Swedish publisher Söderströms merged into one publishing house, Schildts & Söderströms.

After an apprenticeship at his uncle's bookstore, Holger Schildt founded a publishing house in Borgå (Porvoo) in 1913, which was reorganized into Holger Schildts Förlags AB in 1919. In 1991, the publishing house merged with Editum, which published textbooks. Among the publisher's fiction writers, Tove Jansson is internationally known; her original Moomin series was published by the company. In addition to Swedish-language since 1987 it has also published Finnish-language literature, mainly translations but also original Finnish titles later on. A Finnish editorial office was established in 1996. Schildts was a partner in Förlagssystem Finland and Alfabeta Bokförlag in Sweden.

The publisher's annual output was 30–40 titles for the general editorial staff, some 30 textbooks, 20–30 Finnish books, and partial editions from Sweden. The range included fiction, nonfiction, children's books and encyclopedias, including the encyclopedia Uppslagsverket Finland. In nonfiction, Schildts focused on cultural history in a broad sense. The proportion of nonfiction, novels and poetry was around 40–40–20, but varied from year to year. Typically between two and five debut authors were published each year, while around 150 first-time manuscripts were received.
