= Ann-Marie Ivars =

Swedish-speaking Finn writer

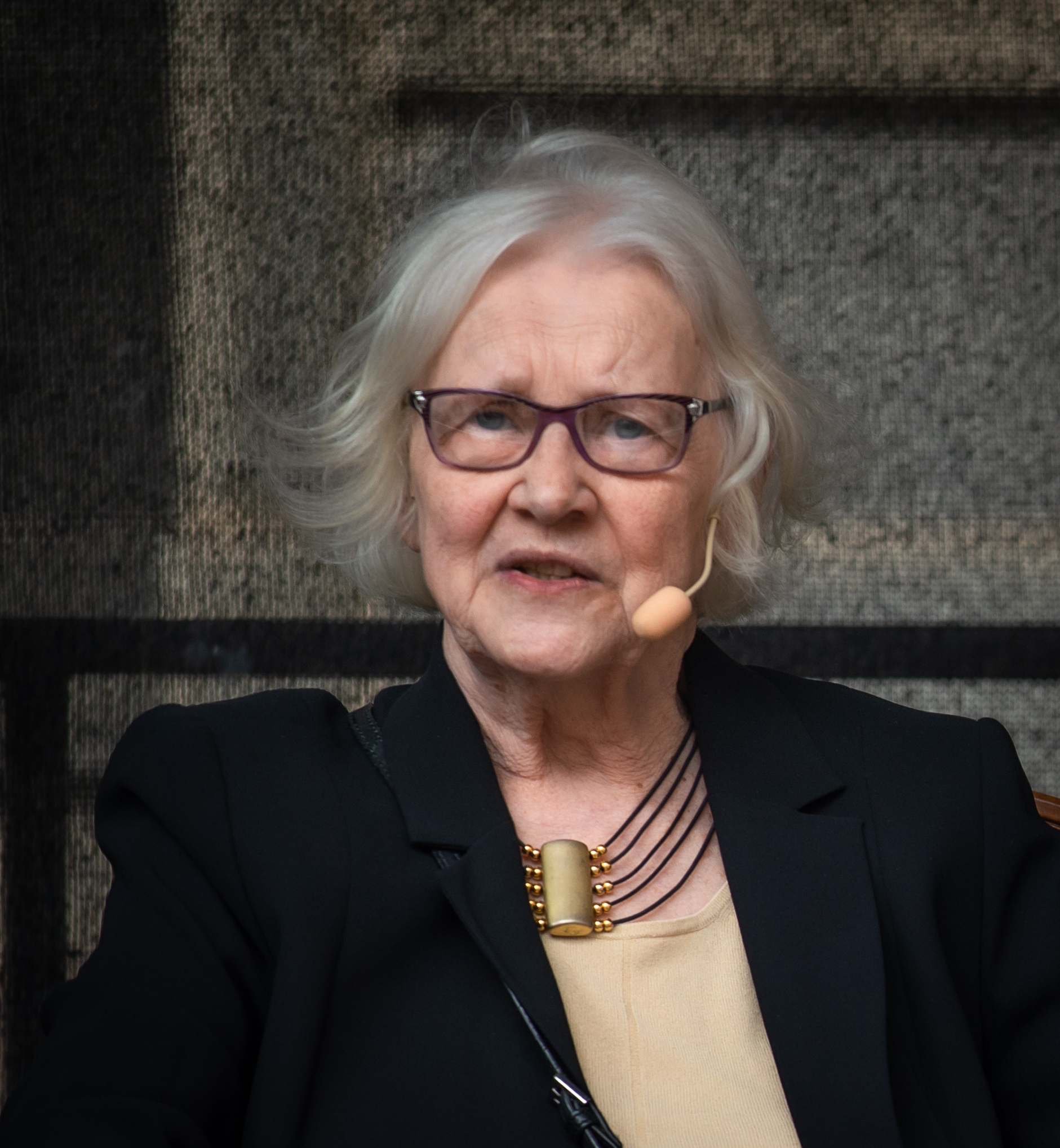
Ann-Marie Ivars in 2021

Ann-Marie Ivars was a Swedish-speaking Finnish writer, with focus on studies of the Swedish dialects in Finland.

== Urban Colloquial Swedish in Finland ==
Urban Colloquial Swedish in Finland is a sociolinguistically oriented project, financed by the Academy of Finland from 1990 to 1995. The aim of the project has been to "describe the local language of a number of towns with a Swedish-speaking population, and to analyze the forces behind the rise and the preservation of local urban varieties". The main results of the project are a dissertation (unpublished), "Morfologisk variation i finlandssvenska stadsmål" ("Morphological variation in Finland Swedish urban colloquial language") by Marie-Charlotte Gullmets (1994), and a monograph, "Stad och bygd" ("Town and rural surroundings") by Ann-Marie Ivars (1996). In 1994–1995 the funding was Mk320,000. The leader of the project was Professor Ann-Marie Ivars.

== Uppslagsverket Finland ==
Ivars has also been a member of the editorial board of Uppslagsverket Finland, a Swedish-language encyclopedia covering Finnish, and particularly Finland-Swedish subjects.
