= Uppslagsverket Finland =

Swedish-language Finnish encyclopedia

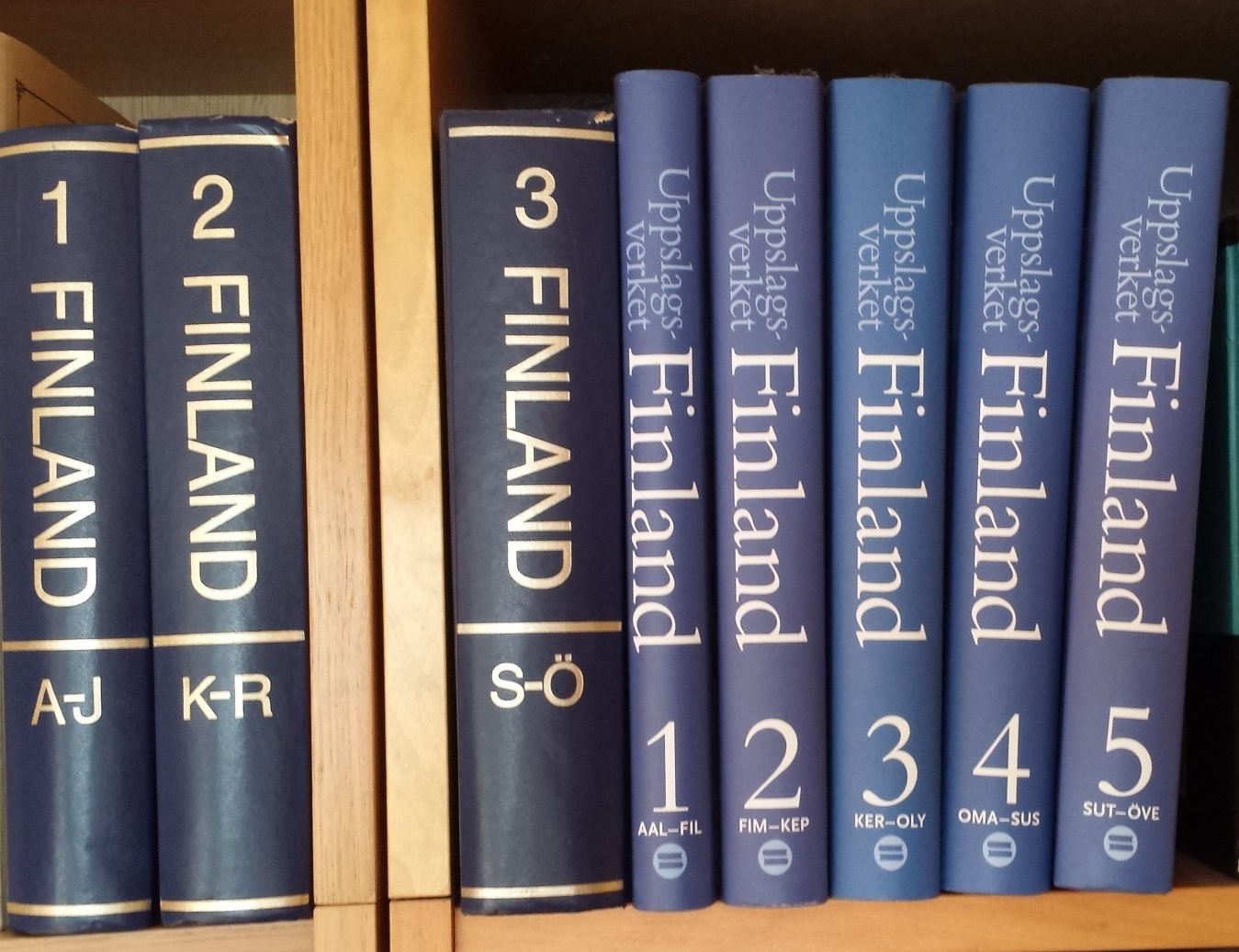
- Printed editions of the encyclopaedia.
- Editors: Henrik Ekberg et alii
- Language: Swedish
- Genre: Encyclopedia
- Publisher: Schildts
- Publication date: 1982–1985; 2003–2007 (2nd edition)
- Publication place: Finland
- ISBN: 9789515002679
- Website: uppslagsverket.fi

Uppslagsverket Finland ('Encyclopedia Finland') is a Swedish-language encyclopedia from Finland with a focus on Svenskfinland and Finland-Swedish subjects.

The encyclopedia is published by initiative of an association dedicated to this task, Föreningen finlandssvenska uppslagsverk ('the Finland-Swedish Encyclopedia Association'). The initiative to the publication was taken in 1969, and the first edition was published in three volumes in 1982 to 1985.

A second edition was published by Schildts in five volumes during 2003 to 2007.

In 2009, the encyclopedia was made freely available online, with funding from the educational association Svenska Folkskolans Vänner (SFV).

== History ==
The encyclopedia was initiated in 1969, and work began in July of the same year. The starting point was a perceived lack of attention to Swedish Finland in both encyclopedias written in Finnish and encyclopedias published in Sweden.

To carry out the project, Föreningen finlandssvenska uppslagsverk ('the Finland-Swedish Encyclopedia Association') was formed, which also received support from several Finland-Swedish foundations and eventually from the Finnish state. The largest financial contribution was made by Svenska Folkskolans Vänner (SFV) and Schildts, which also acted as publisher.

== Paper edition ==
The first edition was published in three volumes between 1982 and 1985, as the largest publishing venture in Swedish in Finland to date. The volumes were each about 700 pages long, and contained a total of about 9,000 articles. By its own admission, the encyclopedia was a sales success, with distribution both in Swedish-speaking Finland and outside of the country.

After a number of years, however, the need for a new edition arose to cover developments in Swedish Finland. A second edition was published by Schildts in five volumes between 2003 and 2007, with a total of more than 12,000 articles. The financing was again mainly provided by SFV, and SFV noted a production cost of 10 million euros.

The second edition of Uppslagsverket Finland experienced some sales difficulties, similar to encyclopedias in book form in many other countries at the time.

== Internet launch ==
In 2009, the encyclopedia was made available online for free. There are no subscriptions or passwords for the online edition or advertisements on the website. SFV was mainly responsible for the internet launch, while Schildts was responsible for updating the content and involved a number of experts.

In 2012, the two Finland-Swedish publishers Schildts and Söderström & Co merged to form Schildts & Söderströms. As a result of the merger, Uppslagsverket Finland was taken over in its entirety by SFV.

The article content, except for the majority of the images, may be reused under the Creative Commons free license CC-BY-SA 4.0.

At the time of its launch, Uppslagsverket Finland was located at the domain address www.uvf.fi. Since then, it has moved to www.uppslagsverket.fi, which has meant that links from Wikipedia have had to be reformatted.

== Editorial staff ==
=== Editors ===
The editor-in-chief of both printed editions was Henrik Ekberg, and the chairman of the editorial board during production was Erik Allardt.

Sigbritt Backman was editor-in-chief of the online edition from autumn 2009 to autumn 2010, and then Johan Lindberg took over the task until spring 2012. The editor in charge since 1 June 2012 is Rabbe Sandelin.

At the time of the internet launch, it was noted that the responsibility for updating the encyclopedia was handled by two full-time editors; however, at the beginning of 2016, it was noted that Uppslagsverket Finland is not being actively updated. Readers are asked to contact the editorial team if anything needs updating.

=== Editorial board ===
In addition to the permanent editorial staff, the editorial board has been joined by some 20 Finland-Swedish subject experts.

In February 2016, the following persons were listed as members of the editorial board of Uppslagsverket Finland:

- Kristian Donner, zoologist
- Torsten Edgren, archaeologist
- Henrik Ekberg, editor
- Håkan Eklund, editor
- Patrick Eriksson, architect
- Mikael Finell, historian
- René Gothóni, religious scholar
- Carl-Adam Haeggström, botanist
- Peter Holmberg, physicist
- Lena Huldén, historian
- Ann-Marie Ivars, linguist
- Henrik Knif, historian
- Gunhard Kock, editor
- Mikael Korhonen, historian
- Christer Kuvaja, historian
- Tua Kyrklund, information officer
- Mats Liljeroos, music critic
- Joachim Mickwitz, historian
- Jessica Parland-von Essen, historian
- Tom Petterson, medical doctor
- Henry Rask, historian
- Rabbe Sandelin, editor
- Tom Söderman, ambassador
- Gustaf Widén, cultural journalist

== Bibliography ==
=== First edition ===
1. Uppslagsverket Finland 1: A–J (1982), ISBN 951-50-0267-2
2. Uppslagsverket Finland 2: K–R (1983), ISBN 951-50-0296-6
3. Uppslagsverket Finland 3: S–Ö (1985), ISBN 951-50-0331-8

=== Second edition ===
1. Uppslagsverket Finland 1: Aal–Fil (2003), ISBN 951-50-1356-9
2. Uppslagsverket Finland 2: Fim–Kep (2004), ISBN 951-50-1369-0
3. Uppslagsverket Finland 3: Ker–Oly (2005), ISBN 951-50-1370-4
4. Uppslagsverket Finland 4: Oma–Sus (2006), ISBN 951-50-1371-2
5. Uppslagsverket Finland 5: Sut–Öve (2007), ISBN 951-50-1372-0

== See also ==
- Biografiskt lexikon för Finland
