= Svenska folkskolans vänner =

Finnish non-governmental organization

- Formation: 1882
- Legal status: Association
- Headquarters: Helsinki, Finland
- Official language: Swedish
- Chair: Wivan Nygård-Fagerudd
- Chancellor: Johan Aura
- Affiliations: EFC
- Staff: 19
- Website: https://www.sfv.fi/sv/hem/

Svenska folkskolans vänner r.f. (abbreviated SFV) is a Finland-Swedish association aiming to support the schooling of the Swedish-speaking minority in Finland. It is considered one among the most important institutions in Svenskfinland.

Since the introduction of compulsory education in Finland in 1921, the association's main task has been to promote education, culture and free learning in Swedish in Finland. Each year, SFV also awards prizes, scholarships and medals, as well as grants in the sectors of education, culture and libraries, and liberal education. The association also maintains Swedish folk high schools and vocational training within the framework of Axxell Utbildning Ab.

== History ==
The association was founded in 1882 by Vilhelm Grefberg, a physician. In the 1880s, Finland's language policy became more Finnish-centered. This led to the founding of SFV in order to guard the interests of the Swedish-speaking minority. This manifested itself in the founding of Swedish-speaking schools throughout the country (until 1917 part of the Russian Empire). The association published magazines, organised events and raised funds as well as tried to show the Russian authorities that they did not want to lose their mother tongue and go to Finnish-speaking schools or become Russian-speakers. The first secretary of the association was Axel Lille.

According to its mission, SFV's activity consists of three main things:

- Awarding grants and scholarships
- Maintaining educational programs and publishing houses
- Publishing its own works

SFV is the seventh largest owner (with 7.88% of the shares) of Veritas, a Finnish pension insurance company. The association also is the biggest owner of Axxell Utbildning Ab, a Swedish-language vocational school operating in nine municipalities.

Until 2012, the association owned Schildts publishing house, and after a publishing merger in 2012, it is the second-largest owner of the Finnish-Swedish publishing house Schildts & Söderströms, which it owns together with Finlands Svenska Lärarförbund. SFV also maintains Svenska studiecentralen ('the Swedish Study Centre'), which has its origins in the SFV Lecture Bureau, founded in 1919. From 1998 to 2015, SFV also ran Svenska produktionsskolan ('the Swedish Production School', Sveps) in Helsinki and Föregångarna in Vaasa, both of which were transferred to Folkhälsan Utbildning Ab on 1 August 2015.

The seat of SFV is located in Helsinki but it has side operations in both Vaasa and Turku. The association is a member of the European Foundation Centre. As of 2017 the association's chair is Wivan Nygård-Fagerudd.

== Publications ==
Since 1886, the association has published an annual calendar, and since 1922 a member magazine, Svenskbygden, called SFV-magasinet since 2015. Four issues are published per year. Svenska folkskolans vänner sponsors the online version of the encyclopedia Uppslagsverket Finland, launched in 2009, which can thus be offered free of charge to readers.

== Awards and grants ==
In 2023, the SFV awarded a total of more than 2.2 million euros in grants, scholarships and awards. One of the association's biggest awards is Kulturpriset ('the Culture Award'), which is awarded from the Signe and Ane Gyllenberg Fund. The award is worth 15,000 euros. The 2018 Kulturpris went to Anna-Maria Helsing.

In 2019 SFV gave a grant of 20,000 euros to Projekt Fredrika, which aims to make the Finland-Swedish culture in Finland more visible on Wikipedia.
