= Söderman =

Söderman is a Swedish surname.

== Geographical distribution ==
As of 2014, 78.3% of all known bearers of the surname Söderman were residents of Sweden (frequency 1:4,500) and 20.0% of Finland (1:9,816).

In Sweden, the frequency of the surname was higher than national average (1:4,500) in the following counties:

1. Gävleborg County (1:2,000)
2. Uppsala County (1:2,082)
3. Stockholm County (1:2,550)
4. Jämtland County (1:2,672)
5. Västmanland County (1:3,016)
6. Västernorrland County (1:3,088)
7. Värmland County (1:3,963)
8. Västerbotten County (1:4,481)

In Finland, the frequency of the surname was higher than national average (1:9,816) in the following regions:

1. Ostrobothnia (1:772)
2. Åland (1:873)
3. Southwest Finland (1:4,241)
4. Satakunta (1:9,280)

== People ==
- August Söderman (1832–1876), Swedish composer
- Karl Söderman (1863–1911), Finnish engineer and businessman
- Harry Söderman (1902–1956), Swedish police officer and criminalist
- Walter Söderman, Swedish ice hockey player
- Tom Söderman (1936–2015), Finnish diplomat and journalist
- Jacob Söderman (born 1938), Finnish politician
- Mikael Söderman, Swedish football manager
- Ulf Söderman (born 1963), Swedish athlete

== See also ==
- Soderman (disambiguation), including a list of people with the surname
