= Emma Irene Åström =

Finnish teacher (1847–1934)

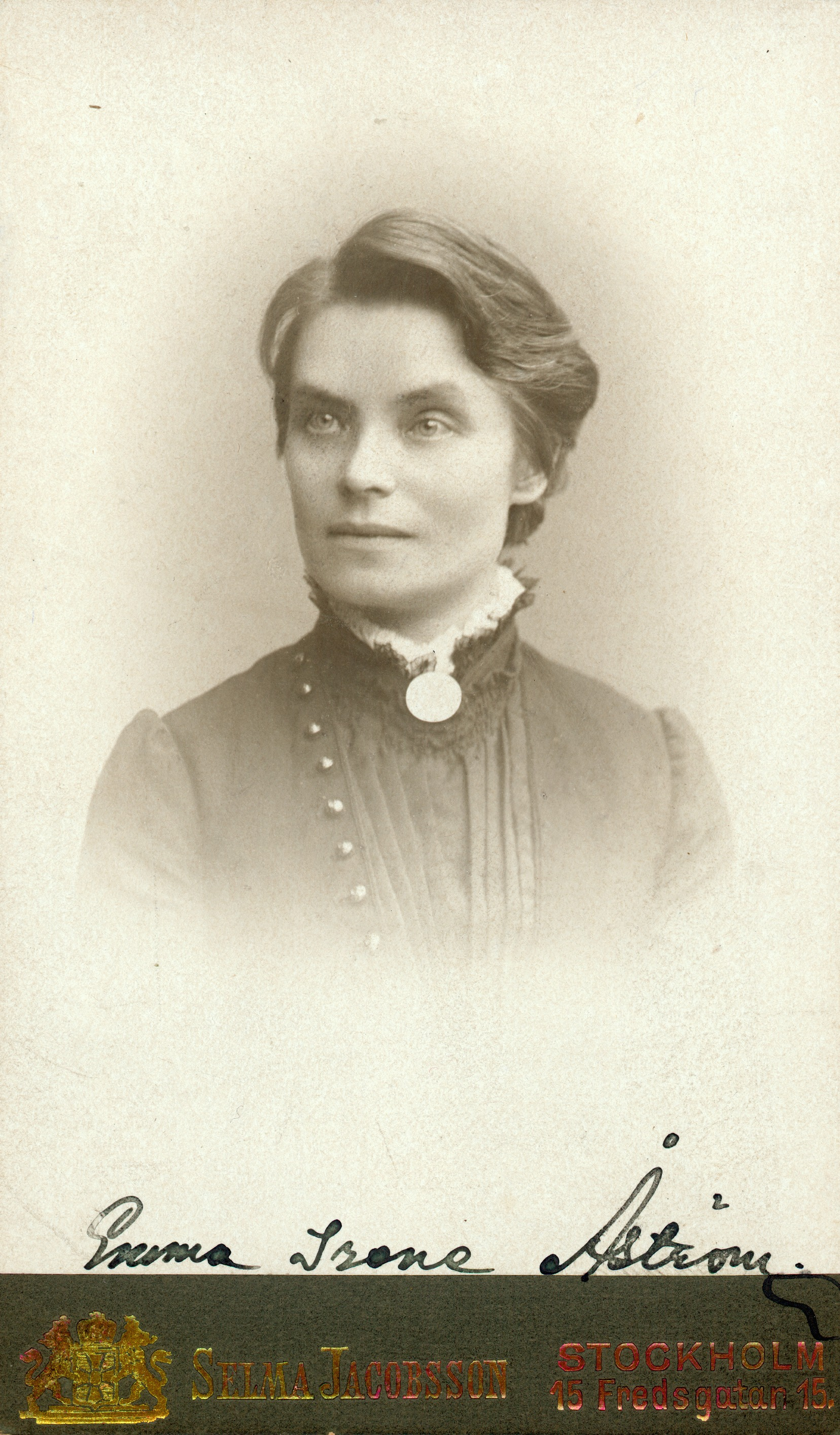
Åström in the 1880s or 1890s

Emma Irene Åström (27 April 1847 – 3 July 1934) was a Finnish teacher and Finland's first female university graduate.

== Early life ==
Åström was born in 1847 in Taivassalo, in the Turku and Pori Province of the Grand Duchy of Finland. Her parents were Justiina Jakobsson, a servant, and Carl Åström, a surveyor. She was the oldest of five children. In 1853, the family moved to Åland, a Swedish-speaking region of Finland, where Emma Åström was raised to speak Swedish and attended a school in Finström.

== Education ==
She was sent to the Jyväskylä Teachers' College in 1865 with the persuasion of local clergy members, and the college's director, Uno Cygnaeus, served as her unofficial guardian. Encouraged by Ernst Bonsdorff, the school's mathematics teacher, Åström decided to apply to a Finnish university. Although Cygnaeus initially refused to support the idea, he arranged, through his colleague Cassie von Kothen, for Åström to study at the University of Helsinki.

Although a place had been secured for Åström at the University of Helsinki after her graduation from Jyväskylä Teachers' College in 1873, her father's death in 1874 forced her to postpone her university studies. She accepted a teaching position at Ekenäs Teachers' College to earn money to support her family. Two years later she returned to university and graduated with a master's degree in philosophy in 1882, making her the first woman in Finland to receive a university degree.

== Career ==
After graduating, Åström taught at the German school in Helsinki from 1882 to 1886. In 1886, Åström returned to Ekenäs Teachers' College, where she worked as a Lector of Swedish, Finnish, and history until 1912. From 1913 to 1924, she taught at a co-educational school and at a mission school in Ekenäs. In 1927, she was awarded an honorary Doctor of Philosophy degree from the University of Helsinki, becoming the first Finnish woman to receive an honorary degree. Although she aspired to return to university for further studies, she "abandon[ed] the thought" since she was obliged to support her family financially.

== Death ==
Åström died in Tammisaari on 3 July 1934.

== Legacy ==
After graduating from university, Åström became an icon, not only for the feminist movement in Finland at the time, but also for Finland's Swedish-speaking population. She was the subject of poems written by Swedish-speaking author Zachris Topelius and the feminist writer Adelaïde Ehrnrooth. Topelius is also said to have modelled a character in his novel Planetarnes skyddslingar (Protégés of the Planets) after her. Despite this, Åström once said: "There is no point in calling me a pioneer, because I have never consciously been one." A biography, Emma Irene Åström, Finlands första kvinnliga filosofie magister, was written by Margit Åström and published in 1967.

== See also ==
- Maria Tschetschulin

== Publications ==
- Elämäni ja ystäväni. Muistelmateos (My Life and My Friends. A Memoir), edited by Elsa Enäjärvi-Haavio, 1933.
- Mitt liv och mina vänner (My Life and My Friends), 1934.
- Margit Åström (1967). Emma Irene Åström, Finlands första kvinnliga filosofie magister. Skrifter utgivna av Svenska litteratursällskapet i Finland (in Swedish). Helsinki: Society of Swedish Literature in Finland. ISBN 978-951-583-388-4. Wikidata Q113528457.
