= Hugo Bergroth =

Finnish philologist and language planner

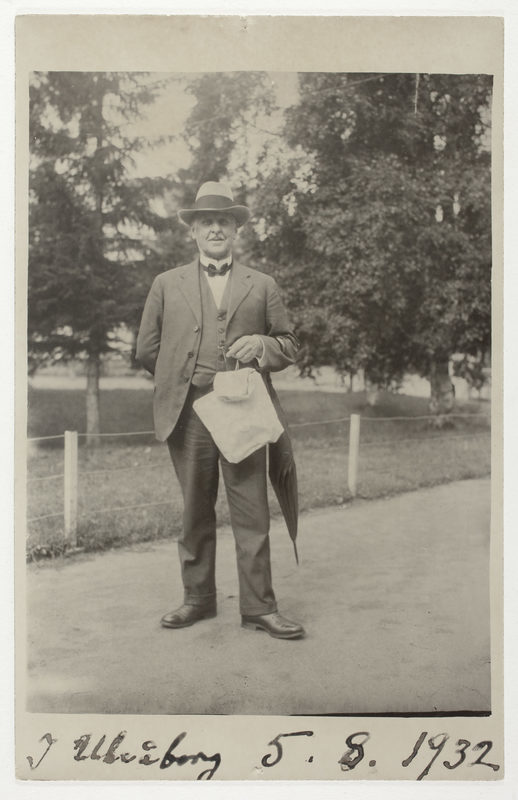
- Hugo Bergroth in 1932
- Born: Karl Hugo Bergroth; 18 May 1866; Helsinki, Grand Duchy of Finland
- Died: 1 April 1937 (aged 70); Helsinki, Finland
- Occupations: Philologist, language planner
- Employer: University of Helsinki
- Known for: Finlandssvenska (1917)

Karl Hugo Bergroth (18 May 1866 – 1 April 1937) was a Finnish philologist and language planner. He served as lecturer in Swedish at the University of Helsinki for over forty years and devoted his career to preserving Finland Swedish as part of standard Swedish. His principal work, Finlandssvenska (1917), remains one of the most comprehensive documentations of Finland-Swedish deviations from the Swedish spoken in Sweden. He was the brother of entomologist Ernst Evald Bergroth.

== Early life and education ==
Bergroth's father, Julius Efraim Bergroth, was headmaster of the Swedish Normal Lyceum in Helsinki and later chief inspector at the National Board of Education. His mother, Charlotte Christina Barcker, was a sea captain's daughter from Jakobstad. Through her, Bergroth developed an interest in music and a well-trained musical ear, which proved useful in his later work on pronunciation and which he enjoyed as an amateur violinist.

Bergroth matriculated from the Swedish Normal Lyceum in 1884 and obtained his Bachelor of Philosophy degree at the University of Helsinki in 1888, with coursework in Swedish language and literature, Latin literature, aesthetics and modern literature, Greek literature, and botany. Shortly afterwards he joined the Swedish Dialect Society in Helsinki and undertook journeys to the Åland Islands, where he recorded dialects, songs with words and melodies, and other folkloristic material. He intended to use these recordings for a doctoral dissertation, but abandoned the plan after Anton Karsten published a dissertation on the dialect of Kökar in autumn 1891 with largely similar material.

In the spring term of 1890, Bergroth studied at Uppsala University, where he came into contact with several leading Nordic philologists, among them Adolf Noreen. He maintained his connections to Sweden through research visits to Lund in 1910, 1911, and 1912, and to Uppsala in 1914.

During his student years, Bergroth was employed as an amanuensis at the Helsinki University Library from 1886 and became a regular amanuensis in 1890.

== Career ==
Bergroth was appointed lecturer in Swedish at the University of Helsinki in 1893 and held the position until his retirement in 1934. As a lecturer, he taught, among others, future mother-tongue teachers and law students, personally assessed student essays, and held exercises in correcting Finland-Swedish texts. From 1892 to 1907 he simultaneously served as librarian at the Helsinki City Library.

Already in the 1890s, Bergroth's interest in language planning appeared in reviews and shorter articles. He also engaged in the spelling reform debate, taking the side of the so-called nystavningen (new spelling); for a spelling reform meeting in Stockholm in 1892 he wrote a paper that was read aloud by Ivar A. Heikel since Bergroth could not attend.

Bergroth recognised early on that Swedish in Finland was developing in a direction that risked isolating it from Swedish as spoken in Sweden. His life's work became counteracting this trend. In the early 1910s he published a series of articles in the calendar of Svenska folkskolans vänner (the Society of Swedish Popular Education in Finland) (1910–1913) on differences between Swedish in Finland and in Sweden. Together with the pamphlet Etthundra i det finländsk-svenska skriftspråket (1912) and the printed lecture Våra provinsialismer (1915), these articles can be seen as preparatory work for his principal book.

=== Finlandssvenska (1917) ===
On 6 November 1917 – the anniversary of Gustavus Adolphus's death, already celebrated as Finland-Swedish Heritage Day – Bergroth signed the preface to his book Finlandssvenska. Handledning till undvikande av provinsialismer i tal och skrift ("Finland Swedish: A guide to avoiding provincialisms in speech and writing"), exactly one month before the Finnish Declaration of Independence. The book constitutes the most comprehensive and well-structured documentation of Finland-Swedish deviations from standard Swedish. It covers pronunciation, morphology, syntax, and vocabulary.

Regarding pronunciation, Bergroth acknowledged that Finland Swedes could never learn the prosody of Sweden Swedish, and he considered attempts to imitate individual Sweden-Swedish speech sounds would make their speech "ridiculously affected". He did, however, advocate a more "energetic" pronunciation and argued that Finland Swedes should follow the Sweden-Swedish system at the phonemic level. He objected, for instance, to the Finland-Swedish merger of long ä and long e in pairs such as väva / veva and mäta / meta, as well as to the tendency to pronounce vowels short in stressed open syllables in common words such as hela, mina, and föreställa – contrary to the general Swedish quantity rule.

A revised second edition of Finlandssvenska appeared in 1928. Already in 1918, Bergroth published Högsvenska (Standard Swedish in English), an abridged version intended for school use, which after his death was edited by Björn Pettersson and continued to be reissued into the 1970s. In 1924 he published Svensk uttalslära ("Swedish pronunciation"), focusing on the differences between Finland-Swedish and standard Swedish phonetics.

=== Stage language ===
Bergroth also played the decisive role in establishing a cultivated Finland-Swedish stage language. The question became pressing in 1915 when the Swedish Theatre was "nationalised", meaning it began employing Finland-Swedish actors. Bergroth, a member of the theatre's board, wrote a detailed memorandum on the principles for a Swedish stage language for Finland. The starting point was that the theatre should use a form of language that could serve as the Finland-Swedish linguistic ideal. Bergroth served as language advisor and language instructor at the theatre from 1916 to 1921.

== Honours and appointments ==
Bergroth was awarded an honorary doctorate in philosophy by Lund University in 1918 and received the title of professor in 1919. In 1935 he was elected an honorary member of the Society of Swedish Literature in Finland.

He served, among other roles, as a member of the board of Svenska folkskolans vänner (1895–1910), member of the board of the Society of Swedish Literature in Finland (1912–1921 and 1923–1935), member of the board of the Swedish Theatre (1913–1936), and vice chairman of its directorate (1917–1936).

== Selected works ==
- Etthundra i det finländsk-svenska skriftspråket, särskilt tidningsspråket, förekommande provinsialismer (1912)
- Våra provinsialismer (1915)
- Finlandssvenska. Handledning till undvikande av provinsialismer i tal och skrift (1917; 2nd ed. 1928)
- Högsvenska. Kortfattad hjälpreda vid undervisningen i modersmålet (1918)
- Om kvantitetsförhållandena i den bildade finlandssvenskan (1922)
- Om konsonantljuden i den bildade finlandssvenskan (1922)
- Om vokalljuden i den bildade finlandssvenskan (1924)
- Svensk uttalslära med särskilt beaktande av skiljaktigheterna mellan det finländska och det högsvenska ljudskicket (1924)

== Legacy ==
The Hugo Bergroth Society was founded in Helsinki in 1992 with 18 regular members. The Hugo Bergroth Prize was established in 1993; its first recipient was radio editor Ann-Kristin Schevelew.

== Personal life ==
Bergroth married Maria Elisabeth (Elsa) Fabritius in the summer of 1893. The couple had three children.

According to Rolf Pipping's 1958 essay on Bergroth, his students described him as a strict, thorough, and conscientious teacher, but also as a modest, warm-hearted, and kind person.
