= Hugo Pipping =

Finland Swede linguist (1864–1944)

Knut Hugo Pipping
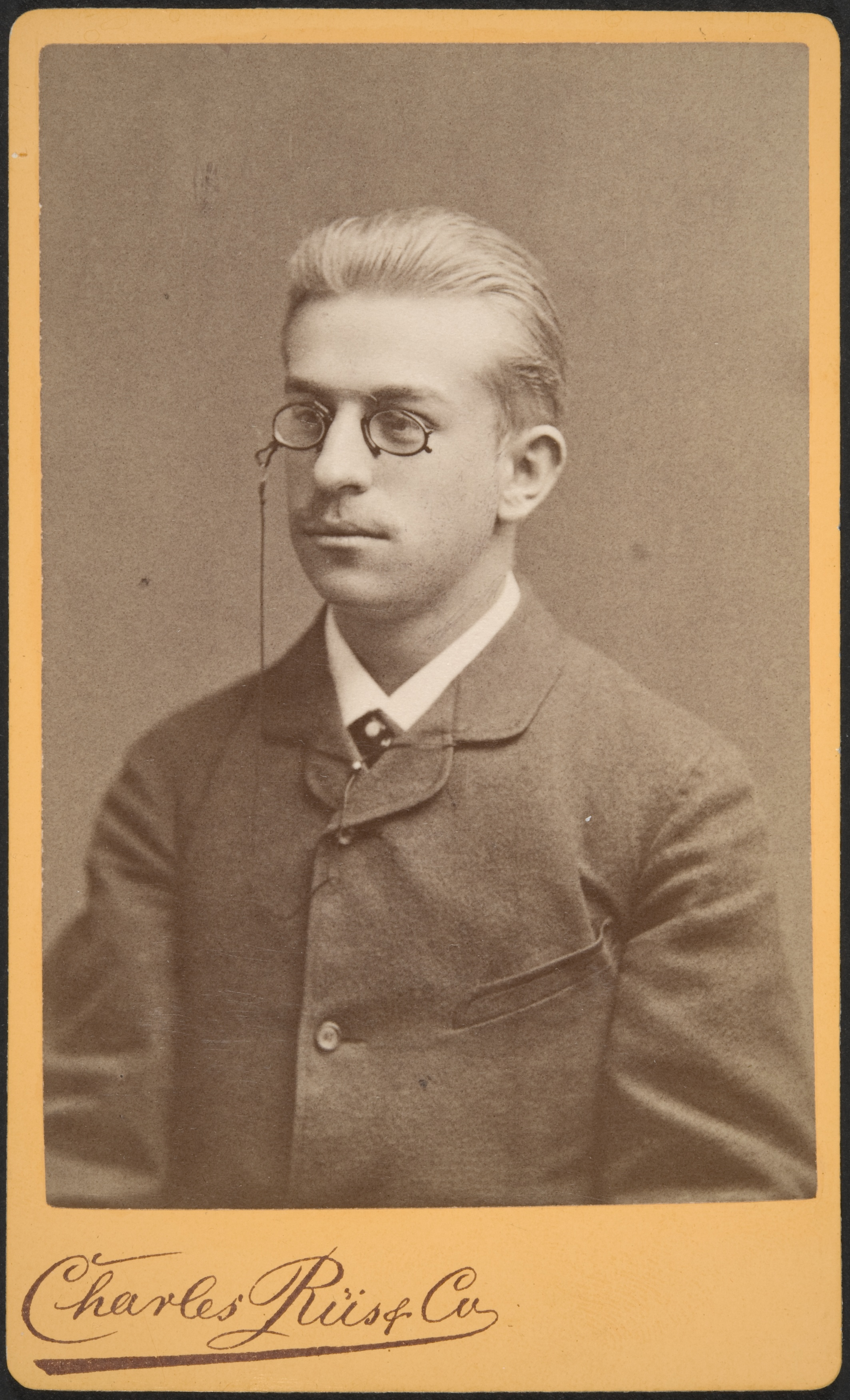
- Hugo Pipping in the early 1890s
- Born: November 5, 1864; Tavastehus, Grand Duchy of Finland
- Died: July 31, 1944 (aged 79); Turku, Finland
- Occupations: Linguist, professor

Knut Hugo Pipping (5 November 1864 – 31 July 1944) was a Finland Swede linguist who introduced experimental acoustic phonetics to the Nordic countries and later held the chair of Nordic philology at the University of Helsinki from 1908 until his retirement in 1932. A trained phonetician who turned in mid-career to philology, he is remembered both for very early instrumental work on the acoustic properties of vowels and for studies in the language history of Old Gutnish and Old Swedish.

Pipping belonged to an academic Swedish-speaking family long established in Finland. He was a grandson of the university rector and senator Fredrik Wilhelm Pipping, a brother of the writer Aline Pipping, and the father of the literary scholar Rolf Pipping and the economist Hugo E. Pipping.

== Early life and education ==
Pipping's birthplace, Tavastehus (Finnish: Hämeenlinna), reflected a passing posting of his father Knut Theodor Pipping, the district engineer responsible for building the railway between Helsinki and Hämeenlinna. His mother was Aline Standertskjöld. The family soon returned to Helsinki, where he was raised within a large extended Pipping household. According to his biographers he was a consistently top-ranking pupil with a marked early talent for music and the piano.

Pipping matriculated in 1882 and enrolled at the Imperial Alexander University in Helsinki, then the only university in the Grand Duchy of Finland. He initially read Latin, with additional study in Sanskrit, French and, later, English, Russian and Greek; his Candidate of Philosophy degree (1886) combined philosophy, Sanskrit and comparative linguistics, Roman literature, and Finnish, Russian and Nordic history. His original plan was to write a doctorate in sociology and psychology, and to that end he spent the spring of 1887 in London.

== Turn to phonetics ==
Pipping shifted course on his return from London. The Helsinki professor of physiology, Konrad Hällsten, urged him to study the new experimental acoustic methods under the German physiologist Viktor Hensen in Kiel. Before leaving for Kiel he married, in 1888, Anna Westermarck — a sister of the social anthropologist Edvard Westermarck, who became a lifelong friend. In Kiel Pipping collected the experimental data on the timbre of sung vowels that formed the basis of his doctoral dissertation, Zur Klangfarbe der gesungenen Vocale, defended in Helsinki in 1890.

The work was favourably received in both Germany and the Nordic countries, and in 1891 Pipping was appointed docent of phonetics at the University of Helsinki — the first such appointment at any Nordic university. Lectures he subsequently delivered in Uppsala on Hensen's methods brought him into close contact with the Swedish philological community, contacts that would shape the rest of his career.

== Scholarly contributions ==
=== Acoustic phonetics ===
Pipping's phonetic work broke with the articulatory tradition then dominant in continental Europe by focusing on the acoustic signal and on auditory perception rather than on the configuration of the speech organs. Using Hensen's instrumentation, he aimed at objective measurement of speech sounds and held that sounds produced by different articulations could nonetheless coincide for the listener. His series of papers on vowel quality and timbre — including Über die Theorie der Vocale (1894) and Zur Phonetik der finnischen Sprache (1899) — appeared in Finnish, Nordic, German and French scholarly venues.

A short article from 1893 on the educated pronunciation of Swedish in Finland is generally regarded as the earliest scientific description of Finland-Swedish. Pipping's wife Anna contributed substantially to the laboratory work behind his analyses.

A frequently cited aspect of his phonetic thought is what he termed substitutionsfrändskap ("substitutional affinity"), a notion formulated as early as 1901 to describe the relationship between sounds that the ear treats as equivalent even when their acoustic realisations differ. The concept has been seen by later commentators as an early anticipation of the structural phoneme of twentieth-century linguistics.

=== Nordic philology ===
From around the turn of the century, Pipping increasingly directed his attention to historical linguistics and to philology in the manuscript tradition, without abandoning his phonetic interests. His Gotländska studier (1901) combined an edition of the oldest manuscript of the Guta Law with observations on Old Gutnish orthography, inflection and umlaut, and was followed by further Gotlandic studies and by a major series of articles on Old Swedish legal language. Other notable works include Guta lag och Guta saga jämte ordbok (1905–07), a study of the vocabulary of the older Westrogothic law (1913), a paper on the inscription of the Rök runestone (1919), and his synthesis Inledning till studiet av de nordiska språkens ljudlära ("Introduction to the historical phonology of the Nordic languages", 1922), which introduced a new terminology into the field.

Methodologically Pipping remained committed to the historical-comparative paradigm dominant in nineteenth-century Indo-European linguistics, but the phonetician's sensibility — particularly an interest in how synchronic sound systems shape sound change — runs through his philological writing. His former student Arnold Nordling later observed that Pipping's argumentation could at times take elaborately speculative turns; Pipping himself defended bold conjectures as a legitimate, even necessary, motor of philological inquiry.

== Career between Uppsala, Gothenburg and Helsinki ==
The death of A. O. Freudenthal's incumbency at the Helsinki chair of Swedish prompted Freudenthal himself, in 1897, to advise Pipping to retrain at Uppsala University in order to be eligible to succeed him. Pipping spent extended periods in Uppsala from then onwards, qualifying formally for a Swedish-language professorship in 1902 and forming close ties with the leading Swedish philologists of the day — connections he kept up for the rest of his life and which were said to underlie his strong attachment to Sweden as a cultural reference point for Finland's Swedish-speaking community.

In 1903 he was nevertheless appointed in Sweden rather than Finland, taking up a docentship in Nordic languages and phonetics at Gothenburg University College (Göteborgs högskola, now University of Gothenburg), which he held until 1908. He was elected extraordinary professor of Swedish language and literature at Helsinki in 1907, competing against Oskar Fredrik Hultman and Herman Vendell. When the chair was restructured in 1908 it became the ordinary professorship of Nordic philology — the first of that name at the university — and Pipping held it until his retirement in 1932.

== Language policy and public life ==
Pipping represented the Estate of Nobility at the 1897 session of the Diet of Finland, the four-estate parliament of the Grand Duchy, where his positions on questions such as religious freedom and women's access to teaching posts have been characterised as relatively liberal. His political outlook hardened during the radicalisation of Fennoman nationalism in the years that followed, and after the reform of 1906 replaced the Diet with a unicameral parliament he ceased to take part in formal politics.

Within the university, however, he was a leading voice for the Swedish-speaking minority during the bitter language conflicts of the 1910s, supporting a division of teaching and of student nations along linguistic lines. He was also involved in the planning that led to the foundation of Åbo Akademi (now Åbo Akademi University, Finland's only Swedish-language university), arguing strongly for a robust place for the humanities, and he later chaired the delegation of the foundation that supported the institution. In 1901 he served briefly as curator (head) of Nylands Nation, the Helsinki student nation for students from the Uusimaa region.

Pipping took an active part in the public language debates of the period, including the orthographic controversies of the late nineteenth century, the question of which variety of Swedish should be used on the Helsinki stage (he argued for the standard variety used in Sweden, on the grounds that this would preserve the wider Swedish-language cultural community), and the discussion provoked by Hugo Bergroth's 1917 book Finlandssvenska about the distinctiveness and future of Finland-Swedish.

== Honours and societies ==
Pipping was elected to the Finnish Society of Sciences and Letters, to foreign membership of the Royal Society of Arts and Sciences in Gothenburg, and to corresponding membership of the Royal Swedish Academy of Letters, History and Antiquities. His phonetic work brought him honorary membership of several international learned societies, among them the International Society of Experimental Phonetics (1930).

He sat on the board of the Society of Swedish Literature in Finland from 1903 (with an interruption) and chaired it from 1922 to 1924, editing from 1910 the society's series Studier i nordisk filologi. He was subsequently made an honorary member of the society. A Festschrift containing contributions from 59 Finnish and foreign scholars was presented to him on his sixtieth birthday in 1924.

== Later years and death ==
Pipping withdrew gradually from academic life from the late 1920s onwards. The European crisis of the 1930s and the Second World War weighed heavily on him, although he maintained personal contacts with German colleagues despite his stated dislike of the Nazi regime. After his Helsinki home was severely damaged in an air raid he was taken in by friends. He died in Turku on 31 July 1944.
