= Biografiskt lexikon för Finland =

Swedish-language Finnish biographical dictionary

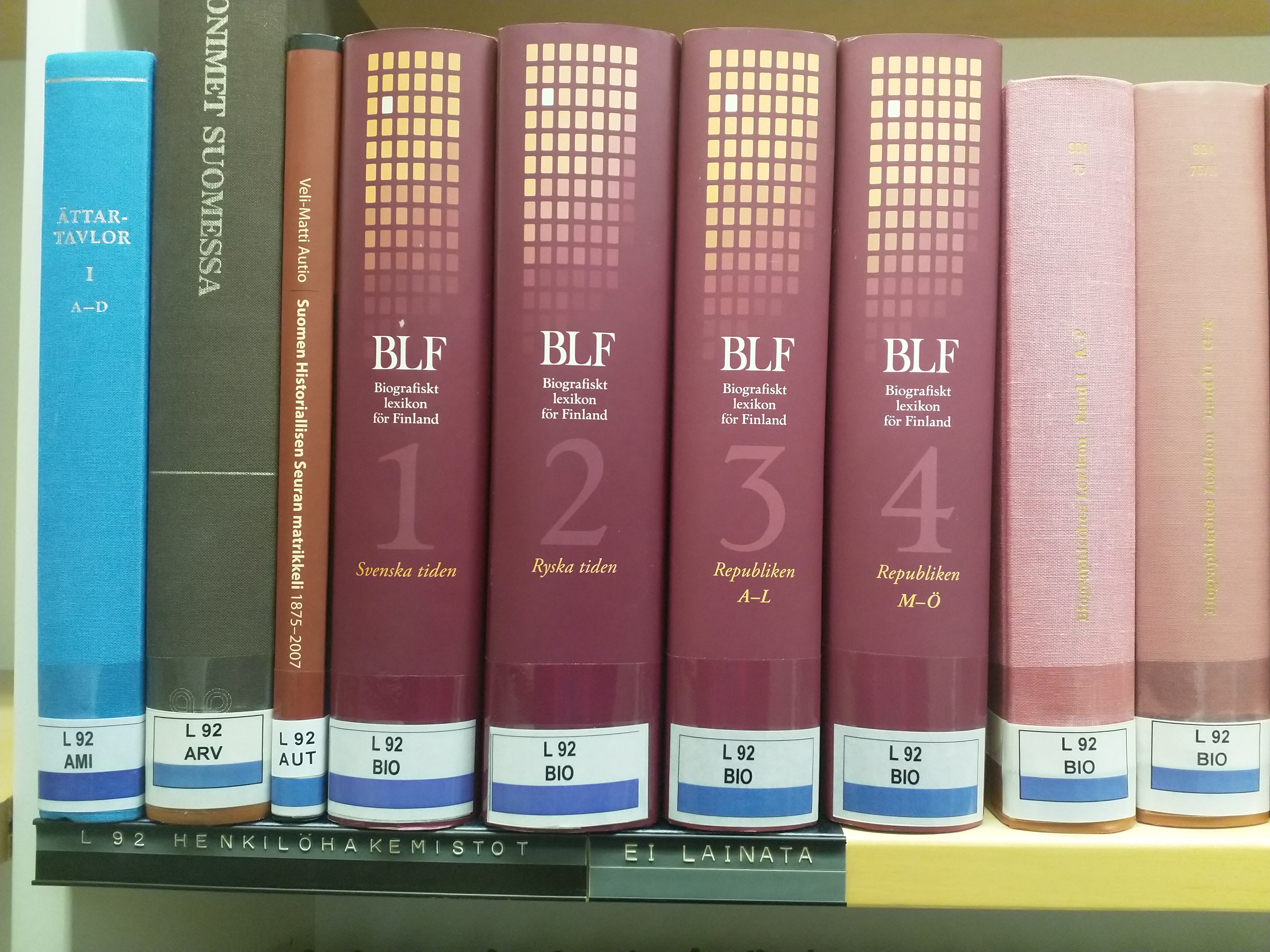
- Editor: Henrik Knif
- Language: Swedish
- Subject: Biography
- Publisher: Society of Swedish Literature in Finland and Atlantis
- Publication date: 2008–2011
- Publication place: Finland
- Pages: 3730
- ISBN: 978-951-583-166-8
- OCLC: 890606399
- Website: https://www.blf.fi

The Biografiskt lexikon för Finland (Biographical Dictionary of Finland, BLF) is a Finnish Swedish-language biographical dictionary that was published between 2008–2011.

In Finland, Suomen kansallisbiografia ('the National Biography of Finland') was published between 2003–2007 in ten volumes, edited by historian and professor Matti Klinge. In 2008, the Society of Swedish Literature in Finland began publishing a corresponding Swedish-language national biographical dictionary, Biografiskt lexikon för Finland. The editorial board is chaired by professor Henrik Meinander and the chief editor is associate professor Henrik Knif.

The BLF is partly based on the content of the Finnish-language Suomen kansallisbiografia, from which articles are translated, but it also contains original articles – primarily about people connected to the Swedish-speaking culture in Finland – which have in turn been partly translated into Suomen kansallisbiografia. In addition to biographies of people born in Finland, it also contains those of foreign-born explorers who made Finland known abroad, as well as leading commanders of foreign or occupying powers who had a major influence on domestic affairs. In terms of the selection of persons, Suomen kansallisbiografia and Biografiskt lexikon för Finland may deal with the same persons as in the Swedish Svenskt biografiskt lexikon, but from a Finnish perspective.

The dictionary is divided into three eras: volume one, the Swedish era; volume two, the Russian era; and volumes three and four, the Republic era. The printed work was published jointly by the Society of Swedish Literature in Finland and the Swedish publisher Atlantis in 2008–2011. Since 2014, all articles have been freely available on its website.

== See also ==
- Uppslagsverket Finland
