= Sohlberg =

Sohlberg is a surname. Notable people with the surname include:

- Harald Sohlberg (1869–1935), Norwegian painter
- Hedvig Sohlberg (1858-1937), Finnish politician, educator, temperance reformer
- Kristian Sohlberg (born 1978), Finnish rally driver
- Tutu Sohlberg (born 1941), Finnish equestrian
- Ernst Bertil Sohlberg (1891–1969) Finnish Diplomat
- Noam Sohlberg (born 1962) Israeli Judge
