= Carl Axel Nordman =

Finnish archaeologist and museum director (1892–1972)

- Born: 28 January 1892; Helsinki, Grand Duchy of Finland
- Died: 27 February 1972 (aged 80); Helsinki, Finland
- Occupations: Archaeologist, art historian, museum director
- Employer: National Board of Antiquities
- Known for: State Archaeologist of Finland 1936–1959; medieval sculpture in Finland
- Spouse: Elin Karen Louise Müller (m. 1915)

Carl Axel Nordman (28 January 1892 – 27 February 1972) was a Finnish archaeologist, art historian and museum professional, widely regarded as one of Finland's most versatile scholars in his field. He served as State Archaeologist — the highest post at the National Board of Antiquities — from 1936 to 1959.

== Biography ==
=== Education and early career ===
Nordman grew up in Helsinki in a civil servant family with roots in Swedish-speaking Ostrobothnia and southern Finnish manor house culture. After graduating in 1909 he chose archaeology as his field of study at the University of Helsinki, also studying literature, history and Latin.

Towards the end of his studies he spent an extended period in Denmark, a visit that proved decisive for his life. He became acquainted with Sophus Müller, the renowned director of the National Museum of Denmark, who became a lasting support for his scholarly work. Nordman married Müller's daughter Elin and spent several years working in Copenhagen. He completed his doctorate in 1919 with a dissertation on passage grave culture in Denmark and was appointed docent in prehistoric archaeology at the University of Helsinki in 1921.

=== Career at the National Board of Antiquities ===
Nordman joined the Archaeological Commission (later the National Board of Antiquities) and rose through the posts of extraordinary amanuensis, intendent of the Coin Cabinet, head of the Historical Department and finally State Archaeologist, appointed in 1936 and serving until his retirement in 1959.

He led the institution through the difficult years of the Second World War. When the collections had to be evacuated, Nordman personally transported the National Museum's most valuable treasures to Stockholm for safekeeping. He also proposed an organised collection of war-related museum material at the front, and National Museum staff participated in the evacuation of museums from the ceded territories.

Among his most significant postwar achievements was the initiative to found the Folk Culture Archive at the Swedish Literature Society in Finland, tasked with documenting the Swedish-speaking folk culture of Finland. He also played an important role in the restoration of major architectural monuments including Turku Castle, Häme Castle and Olavinlinna, and used his authority to prevent the demolition of the war-damaged Guards' Barracks in Helsinki.

=== Research ===
Nordman's scholarly career followed the trajectory of his institutional roles. He began as a Stone Age researcher, moved on to the Iron Age, and devoted his later years to medieval art. His best-known work, Medeltida skulptur i Finland (Medieval Sculpture in Finland, 1965), is the standard reference work in its field. His research on the needlework of the nuns of Naantali Convent and his posthumously published book on medieval decorative arts in Finland have also retained their value, as has his study of the Iron Age in Karelia.

== Bibliography ==
- Studier öfver gånggriftkulturen i Danmark (1918)
- Anglo-Saxon Coins Found in Finland (1921)
- Karelska järnåldersstudier (1924)
- The Megalithic Culture of Northern Europe (1935)
- Medeltida skulptur i Finland (1965)
- Archaeology in Finland before 1920 (1968)
- Finlands medeltida konsthantverk (1980, posthumous)
