= Ernst Bertil Sohlberg =

Finnish diplomat

Ernst Bertil Sohlberg (June 4, 1891, in Hamina – 1969) was a Finnish diplomat.

== Early life ==
Sohlberg's parents were Colonel Fredrik Andreas Sohlberg (1864-1916) and Bertha Viktoria Richter (1864-1921). He graduated in 1908 and studied at the University of Helsinki, graduating as a Bachelor of Law in 1916. Sohlberg received the rank of Master in Law in 1919.

== Career ==
Sohlberg worked for the Foreign Service beginning in 1919. He served as secretary of the Ministry for Foreign Affairs in 1919, as Secretary of State in Copenhagen starting 1920 and in Berlin beginning in 1925, and as Foreign Secretary of the Foreign Ministry since 1929. He received the title of Counselor in 1930. Sohlberg then served as a Counselor in Paris from 1931-1935 and in The Hague from 1935-1939 and as Consul General in Alexandria beginning in 1939.

He entered non-active status in 1942, taking over posts in the Foreign Service.

He served as Chargé d'Affaires in Bratislava in Slovakia in 1944. He served as deputy head of the Ministry for Foreign Affairs from 1946–1949, Head of the Legal Department from 1949-1952 as Counselor in London since 1949 and in Bucharest beginning in 1952.

== Personal life ==
In 1916 Sohlberg married Gerda Ingeborg Rosenius (born 1893)
