= European Foundation Centre =

The European Foundation Centre (EFC) was an international membership association of foundations and corporate funders, based in Philanthropy House, Brussels, Belgium. The organisation was created in 1989 by seven non-profit organisations, in order to support the philanthropic sector in Europe. The organisation ceased to exist in 2022 as the result of a merger with the Donors and Foundations Network in Europe, to form the new Philanthropy Europe Association (Philea).

The European Foundation Centre was one of the leading supporters of the European Commission's failed proposal, the European Foundation Statute. First proposed in 2012, the call for a foundation statute had been supported by the EFC since 2010. The legislative proposal was withdrawn in 2015 following its failure to pass through COREPER 1.
