= Zilliacus =

Zilliacus is a Finland-Swedish surname that may refer to

- Benedict Zilliacus (1921–2013), Finnish journalist, author, scriptwriter and translator
- Bruno Zilliacus (1877–1926), Finnish athlete
- Jutta Zilliacus (1925–2026), Finnish-Estonian journalist, author and politician
- Konni Zilliacus (senior) (1855–1924), Finnish politician, author and independence activist
- Konni Zilliacus (1894–1967), Finnish-born British politician
- Linda Zilliacus (née Gyllenberg, born 1977), Finnish actress
- Thomas Zilliacus (born 1956), Finnish businessman
- Tobias Zilliacus (born 1971), Finnish actor
