= Tom Söderman =

Finnish diplomat and journalist

Tom-Christian Leander Söderman (3 April 1936 in Helsinki – 14 April 2015 in Helsinki) was a Finnish diplomat and journalist.

From 1956 to 1959 and from 1960 to 1961 Söderman was a reporter of the Finnish News Agency and from 1961 to 1963 he was a reporter of Finnish Broadcasting Company. He moved to a Diplomatic career and worked in Stockholm in 1963-1967 as a contributing Press Stance and in 1971-1975 as the corresponding Press Stance. As a press council, Söderman worked from 1975 to 1977 in Stockholm and from 1977 to 1984 in London.

In Stockholm, he sought to present opinions during the Cold War to support Finland's foreign policy. Söderman was the press officer of the Ministry for Foreign Affairs in 1985–1988, the Consul General of Gothenburg in 1988–1993 and the Ambassador to Reykjavík in 1993–2000.

After his diplomatic career, Söderman worked as a freelance writer. He regularly wrote columns on Swedish Utrikesbloggen and cultural newspapers to Nya Argus. Together with Camilla Lindberg he wrote the book Röster från Rosala (Schildt, 2007).
