= European Foundation Project =

European Commission charitable activities proposal

As a European Commission proposal, the European Foundation Statute was a legal framework for non-profit foundations, which would have been additional and complementary to existing national legislations in constituent States. The European Foundation would have been legally recognised in all European Union member states, and would have operated under the same set of conditions across the European Union.

== Purpose ==
Proponents of a European Foundation statute pointed out that foundations and their funders are increasingly working across borders, but that a number of legal and administrative barriers are hampering new foundation initiatives in Europe and the current work of existing foundations.

The statute was proposed to offer an appropriate legal tool to perform and increase foundations work and operations across Europe, while reducing costly administrative burden.

== Status ==
On 8 February 2012, the European Commission presented a proposal on a European Foundation Statute. This proposal has been shared with the Council of Ministers, representing the governments of the 27 member states for review and approval, as well as to the European Parliament for its consent.

The European Parliament pledged support to European statutes for foundations, as well as associations and mutual societies, with the signatures by a majority of its members of a written declaration in February 2011.

The European Economic and Social Committee (EESC), the EU's official advisory body on social and economic matters, passed an opinion backing the statute, drafted by Mall Hellam, by a large majority on 28 April 2010.

The campaign to implement the European Foundation Statute was led by the European Foundation Centre and the Donors and Foundations Networks in Europe (DAFNE).

In January 2015, the Commission confirmed its withdrawal of the legislative proposal for the European Foundation Statute in its 2015 work programme following its failure to pass through COREPER 1.
