= Shallow (underwater relief) =

Shallow is an elevation of the bottom in the sea, river, lake, which impedes navigation. It is a type of an underwater relief where the depth of the water is low compared to that of the surrounding points.

Usually formed by sand or pebble deposits, can also be of volcanic origin or the result of human or animal activities.

Stranded near the shore of a reservoir or watercourse is called a shoal; the shallow ocean area adjacent to the mainland is the continental shelf.

Shallows can be permanently hidden under water or appear on the surface of the water periodically (for example, during low tide in the seas, changes in the water level in rivers from water content) in the form of islands, sediments, side streams, spits, etc.

On river shoals, if possible, to cross the river on foot, or by land transport, arrange fords.

== See also ==
- Spit (landform)
- Rapids
- Reef
- Ocean bank

== Bibliography ==
- Guery, Jean-Louis (2010). Marées, vents et courantsen 150 photos et illustrations (in French). Paris: Voiles et voiliers (Paris). p. 81. ISBN 978-2-916083-43-8.
- Jean-Jacques Delannoy, Philip Deline, René Lhénaff, Géographie physique: aspects et dynamique du géosystème terrestre, De Boeck Superieur, 2016, p. 634.
- Jean Merrien (1958). Dictionnaire de la mer le langage des marins, la pratique de la voile. R. Laffont. pp. XIV-647. Republished in 2001 then in 2014 under the title Dictionnaire de la mer: savoir-faire, traditions, vocabulaires-techniques, Omnibus, XXIV-861 p., ISBN 978-2-258-11327-5
- Vergé-Franceschi, Michel (2002). Dictionnaire d'Histoire maritime (in French). Paris: éditions Robert Laffont. p. 1508. ISBN 2-221-08751-8. 2-221-09744-0.
