= Ivan Belov =

Ivan Belov may refer to:

- Ivan Belov (captain) (1906–1944), Soviet officer and naval captain
- Ivan Belov (commander) (1893–1938), Soviet Komandarm 1st rank
