= Lauttasaari water tower =

Former water tower in Helsinki, Finland

Coordinates: 60°09′46″N 24°53′01″E

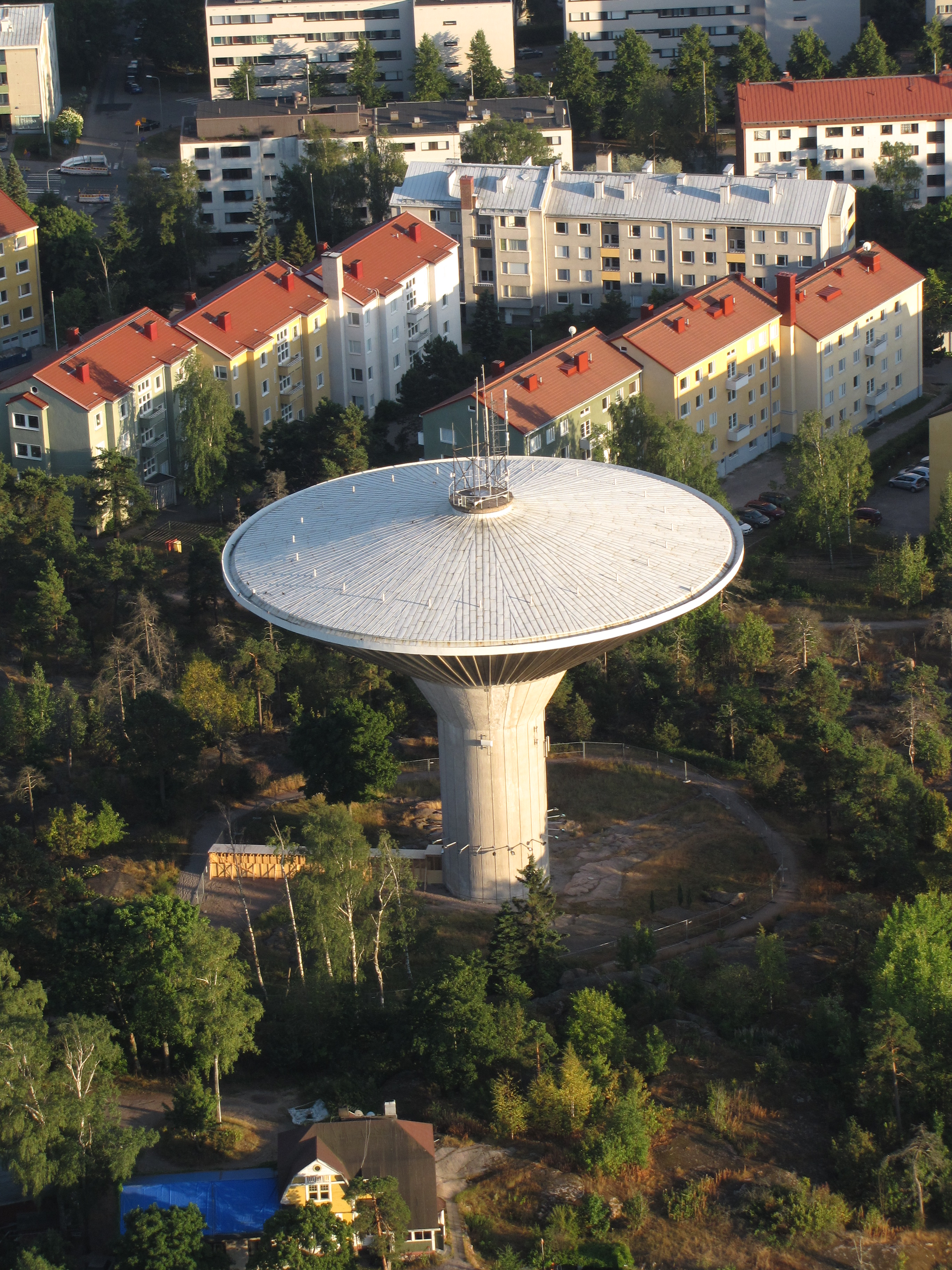
The Lauttasaari water tower in 2010.

The Lauttasaari water tower was a water tower in Lauttasaari, Helsinki, Finland from 1958 to 2015. Its volume was 4400 cubic metres, its height was 34 metres and the diameter of the upper water container was 42 metres. The water tower was decommissioned in 1996 and dismantled from October to November 2015.

== General ==
The Lauttasaari water tower was located on top of the Kotkavuori hill in Lauttasaari. It was built in 1958. As soon as the tower was completed it became a local landmark, and later a kind of symbol of Lauttasaari. The tower was the first mushroom-shaped water tower in Finland, and because of this, it was regarded as an architecturally and historically significant building. Several other mushroom-shaped water towers have later been built in Finland.

== History ==
The solid red circle marks the actual location of the water tower, the hollow red circles mark the alternative options. The old undersea water pipes are shown in dark blue, the common undersea pipe in light blue, the water pipe leading to the tower in green and the church in yellow.

Lauttasaari was connected to the Helsinki waterworks in 1936 by building a 150 millimetre pipe from Salmisaari. Water distribution to the apartments in Lauttasaari was started in the same year. At first the distribution network only reached Lauttasaarentie and its surroundings. As habitation grew denser the need of water increased considerably, and the capacity of the water network was increased in 1939, when a 200 millimetre pipe was built over the bay, next to the Lauttasaari bridge. From the 1950s, Lauttasaari started becoming a proper district, and the number of apartment buildings increased rapidly. In 1951 an additional 300 millimetre pipe was built. The water was taken from the Alppila water towers at the time.

In the 1950s large pressure differences in the Lauttasaari area waterworks became a problem. On days of large water consumption the pressure at the Lauttasaarentie pump station was not enough to bring water to the uppermost apartments in Vattuniemi and on Isokaari. The solution was to build a new water tower in the Lauttasaari area.

=== Planning ===
In 1955, the Helsinki waterworks made a three-year plan for improving the water distribution in the districts newly annexed to Helsinki, which sought funding for expanding the water network in Lauttasaari and building a water tower. The plan had a proposal of 80 million markka for building a water tower. As well as the water network, the plan included a new water pipe from Salmisaari to Lauttasaari and excavating a tunnel needed by the water tower. The plan was accepted in spring 1957. The construction council started design of the water tower in autumn 1956.

The main designer for the tower was the architect Ossi Leppämäki. The construction plans for the tower were made by engineer Paavo Simula, who designed several different alternatives for a Lauttasaari water tower together with architects from the construction council. At the time, the usual type of water tower was a cylindrical container supported by pillars. As well as this option, an option for a conical container, new to Finland at the time, was investigated. These two options did not differ greatly in cost. The advantage for a conical container was smaller change to the level of the water, which would make the pressure in the pipe more stable than in a cylindrical container of the same size. An additional consideration was that a sleeker conical water tower would fit the Lauttasaari environment better. At the time, the only other conical water tower in Finland was a small tower of 250 cubical metres built in Halikko in 1951.

=== Location ===
The waterworks suggest Myllykallio as the location for the new water tower to the construction bureau in April 1956, as it is the highest spot in Lauttasaari. After negotiations with the zoning department it was found that as the Lauttasaari church was being built at the end of Tallbergin puistotie, the water tower would have to be placed at least 70 metres north of the Myllykallio cliffs for zoning reasons, so it would have been constructed about seven metres lower than planned.

In summer 1956 the waterworks suggested Kotkavuori as the new location for the water tower. The proposal said that the effect the Lauttasaari church had on the zoning plan was that Kotkavuori was an equal option for the location as Myllykallio, as both had the same height of 27 metres from sea level in the spots reserved for the water tower. However, had the tower been located in Myllykallio, it would have cost 20 million markka more, as the location was further away from Salmisaari than Kotkavuori.

The Länsiväylä highway was being planned at the same time as the water tower. One of the three options for the location of the highway would have been at tunnel from Kotkavuori to Salmisaari, exactly at the location of the planned water tower. The tunnel plan was abandoned, as it would have required excavation at a depth of 50 metres, which would have made it over two kilometres long and very expensive to carry out. In the end, the Länsiväylä highway was built to pass Kotkavuori to the north.

=== Construction ===
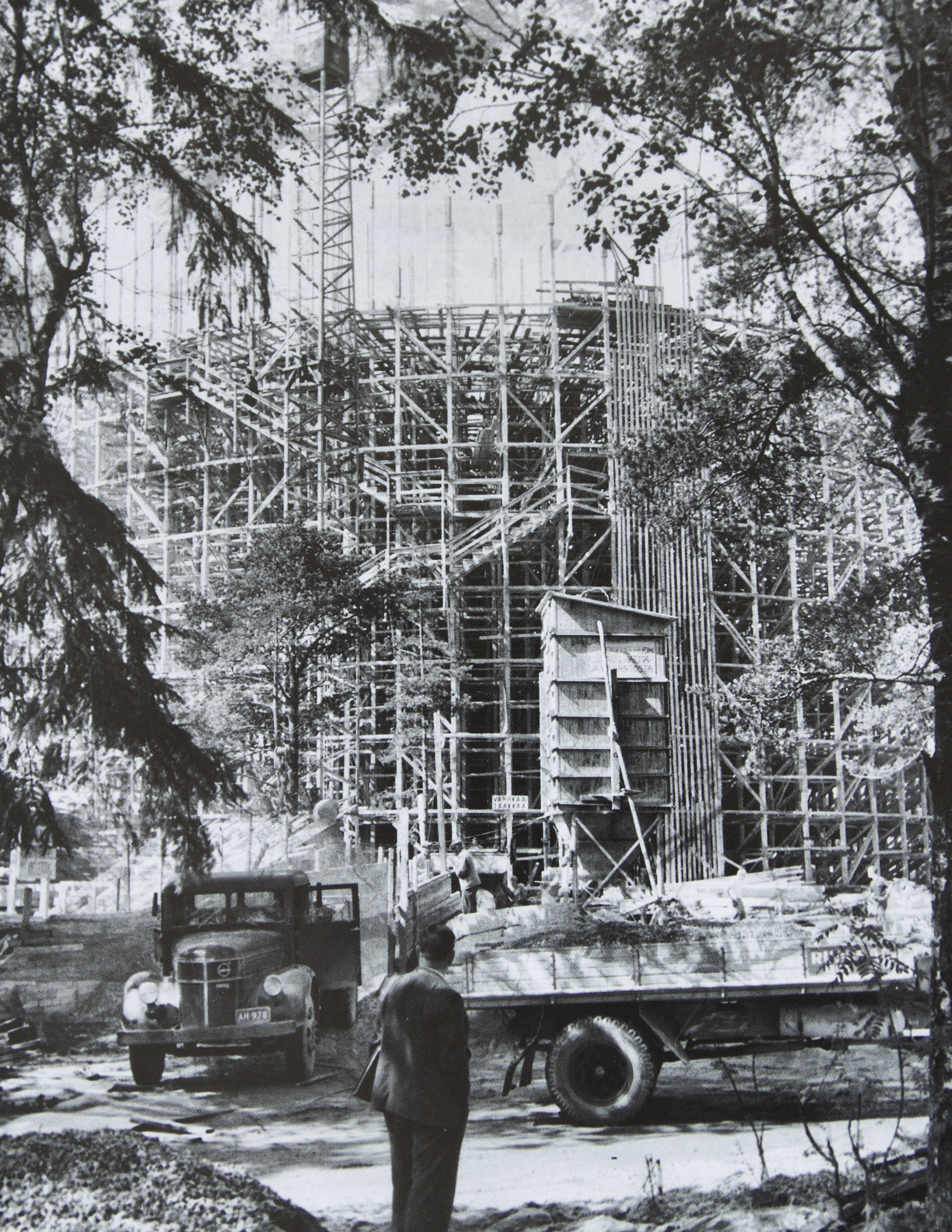
Construction of the Lauttasaari water tower in 1958.

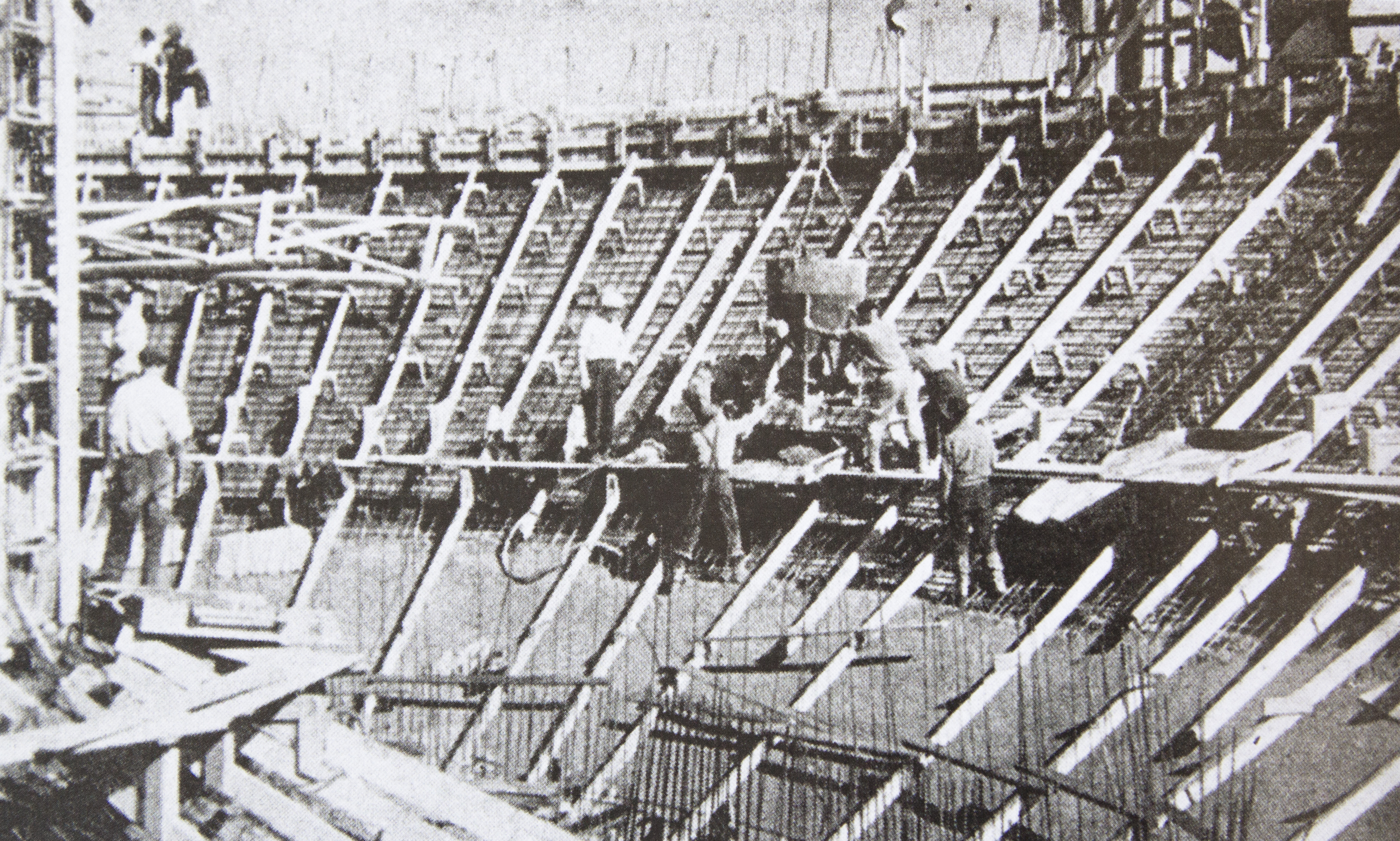
The water container under construction.

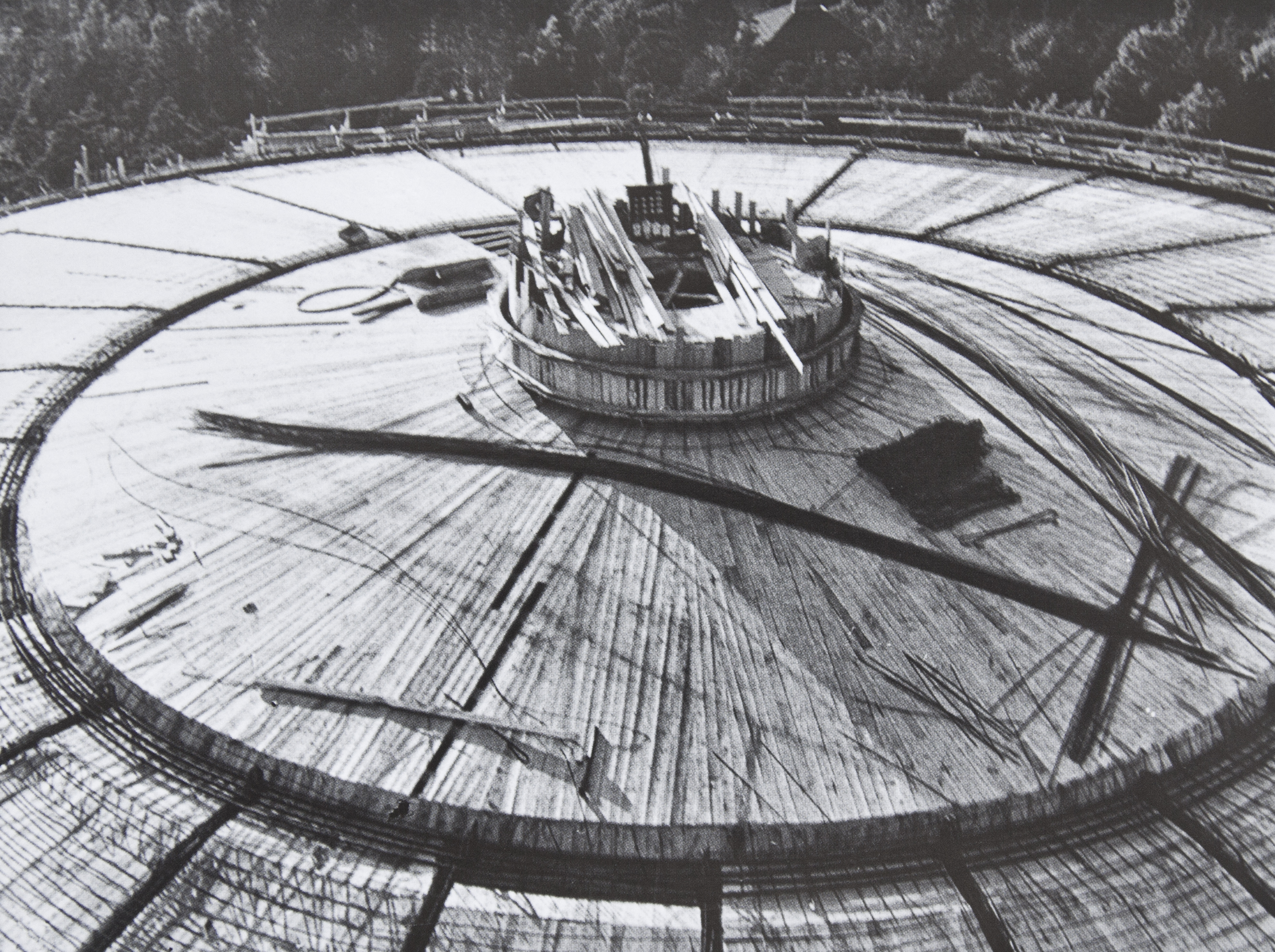
The roof of the tower under construction.

The City Council of Helsinki approved the main design drawings for the Lauttasaari water tower in March 1958. A so-called partial work grant was reserved in the city budget for the construction of the water tower, the water pipe and the undersea pipe. The bidding contest for the construction of the water tower was originally won by Oy Concrete Ab with a price of 59.65 million markka and the contest for tensing the water container by A-Betoni Oy with 6.93 million markka. Concrete had to increase their offer later on. The board did not accept their requirement for the increased cost of the construction and rejected the offer. Construction of the water tower was given to YIT for a price of 64 million markka. The water technics connected to the water tower was implemented by the Helsinki waterworks, which also acted as construction supervisor.

During planning the construction, an alternative where the water container would be built on the ground and later lifted on top of the tower on a shaft was also considered. This alternative proved more expensive, and in the end wooden molds and scaffolding were used in the construction. The scaffolding was planned so that the wood would last as long as possible and could be reused.

Construction was started in early April 1958 and the tower was topped out on 26 September 1958. The casting of the tower took about 100 tonnes of iron and 450 cubic metres of special concrete mass. The tower was first filled with water in October, when it underwent a so-called tightness test. The tower was officially taken into use on 13 November 1958. After this, reinforcing elements were placed on the outer surface of the tower and construction was finally complete in February 1959.

=== Water pipes ===
==== Undersea feeding pipe ====
Before the construction of the water tower there had been three smaller water pipes from Salmisaari to Lauttasaari. After the new water tower was built, the old water pipes did not have enough capacity any more, so a decision was made to build a new 24-inch main feeding pipe.

The construction job of the new feeder pipe was given to YIT and it cost 11.7 million markka. Construction was started in July 1957 by building ground supports, at which the ends of the feeder pipe come out of the ground. New special water pipes brought from Germany were later lowered onto the seabed, floated onto their place with pontoons. The problems with water receiving and pressure differences in Lauttasaari went away when the new water tower was complete and the area got a new feeder pipe. The undersea pipes were renewed in 1971. The current main water pipe goes from Salmisaari to Lauttasaari via a multi-purpose tunnel completed in 2000.

==== Feeding of water to the water tower ====
A new water tunnel from the seashore to the water tower was built in 1958. The construction company was Pyyhtiä & Karppinen Oy, and the tunnel cost 33.85 million markka.

The tunnel was built at Melojantie 2 up to the intersection between Koillisväylä and Klaarantie, at which it passes Kotkavuori and ends at Taivaanvuohentie. A separate branch pipe branches off from the feeder pipe in an undersea tunnel at Kotkavuori. A vertical underground shaft from the tunnel has been built at the same spot, with stairs leading up to the water tower. The Kotkavuori tunnel has entrances from Melojantie and at the Ekonomitalo buildings.

== The water tower as a structure ==
Cross-section of the Lauttasaari water tower: 1. shaft and stairs to the water tunnel, 2. front door, 3. hole in the middle of the tower for supply lifting, 4. central room and support beams, 5. support ring, 6. inner water container, 7. outer water container, 8. air condition pipes, 9. roof platform.

=== The structure of the tower ===
Kotkavuori is located 27 metres above sea level. The height of the water tower was 34 metres, so its roof was located 61 metres above sea level. The diameter of the water container was 42 metres at the widest point. On top of the shaft of the tower were 24 support beams at a 60-degree angle, with a 15.8 metre wide support ring on top of them. The purpose of the beams and ring was to support the water container and to ensure that the structure did not suffer damage due to changes in outdoor temperature or the shape of the concrete shell.

The total volume of the water container was 4530 cubic metres. It was divided into two parts, so that the container could be cleaned without interrupting the water supply. The volume of the inner container was 1080 cubic metres and that of the outer container was 3450 cubic metres. The height of the water surface in both containers was 57 metres above sea level, and the depth of the water in the containers was about seven metres. The water pipes were equipped with automatics that would cut off the water intake when the container was full.

The outer shell and support ring of the tower were pre-tensed concrete to prevent tensions and subsequent damage in the structure. The pre-tension was done in accordance to the Dywidag system, where the tension steel has a diameter of 26 mm. The Lauttasaari water tower was the first water tower in Finland to use pre-tensed concrete. The concrete walls were 25 cm thick. The outer walls and the support ring were cast without interruption, to prevent folds from appearing between the structures and to ensure water-tightness. The work was done in three shifts and took four days in total. The roof of the tower was built from copper.

The thermal insulation was done by adding protective elements representing mushroom gills to the outer walls, with three-centimetre thick cork disks inside them. The roof was insulated with mineral wool, and the shaft and support beams were insulated with chalk-containing LECA brick. The eaves of the roof were heated with resistance wires to prevent falling icicles from forming.

The water in the Lauttasaari water tower was drawn from the Ilmala water tower. As well as Lauttasaari, the pressure area of the tower included Kaskisaari and Lehtisaari.

=== Later and proposed use ===
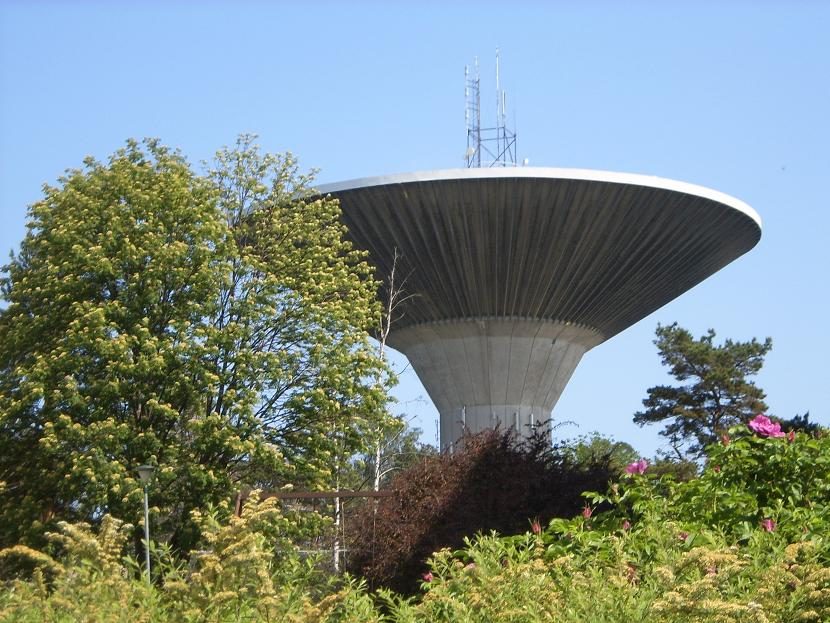
The water tower in 2006.

The water tower was taken out of use in 1996, and since worked mainly as a pedestal for the antennas on top of the roof of the tower. In May 1982 a grid was built on top of the tower, on which two large link antennas were positioned for the use of the defence forces and the frontier guard. Later many new antennas and support stations were built into the tower, and the data equipment needed by them was placed in the interior of the tower. The tower later included antennas needed for the traffic light and passenger information system for the Helsinki public transport radio network and the Helsinki bus line 550.

In December 2000 the Helsinki water works had its 125th anniversary, and a living light artwork named Water Flower by the Dutch artist Harry Hollands was placed on the tower. Before the dismantling of the tower, its lighting had been switched off for years, because the lights had started failing and should have been replaced. According to a report made by Helsingin Energia, replacing the lights would have cost tens of thousands of euros.

The construction bureau made a condition report of the tower in 2008. This report showed that in terms of construction technics, the building was partly in adequate shape. Most of the repairs would have been needed to the outer concrete structure. Repairing the tower and making it safe for use would have cost about 3.3 million euro. This estimate did not include any repair inside the tower. The tower was later fenced off as its concrete facade was deemed as dangerous.

=== Public use ===
Even before the water tower was built, the Lauttasaari foundation wanted the tower to have a viewing point open to the public on top of it, but the city of Helsinki did not agree to this. The city's statement showed that the tower was not suitable for an open observation tower, as it would require building protective structures and full-time security staff. The bureau thought that the concrete platform surrounded by a railing on top of the tower could be used as a temporary viewpoint. When the first Helsinki Day was celebrated on 12 June 1959, the Lauttasaari water tower was open to the public and was a huge success.

The Lauttasaari foundation made several proposals to the Helsinki waterworks in the 1960s to open the tower as a public observation tower. The waterworks agreed to occasional events to allow getting to see views from the tower. There were public events on Helsinki Day from 1959 to 1962 and on Lauttasaari Day in 1965. In 1965 the foundation made a proposal to the waterworks to use the tower as a general observation tower. This would have required improving the safety of the tower and building an elevator inside it. Thus the waterworks sought permission from the city council to make these changes. In May 1966 representatives from the council estimated the suitability of the water tower as a public observation tower. The result was that the tower was not suitable for a public observation tower, as this had not been taken into account during construction of the tower and the cost of building an elevator and improving the stairs would have been too high. After a break of over forty years the waterworks and the Lauttasaari society opened the tower to the public in May 2008 to celebrate the 50th anniversary of the tower and in September 2009 on Lauttasaari Day.

The observation platform on top of the tower was quite small, which placed a limit on the size of the groups visiting the tower. The stairs to the observation platform were winding and difficult to climb. For the tower to be opened permanently to the public, personal safety would have had to be taken into account. The railings, stairs, exits and lighting would have had to be designed to fulfil the requirements for public safety.

=== The Lauttasaari water tower in the media ===
The Lauttasaari magazine started a column called "Tornista katsoen" ("As seen from the tower") in 1977, which was a reference to the Lauttasaari water tower. The icon for the column was a humorous image of a man looking at the sky from top of a disproportionally tall water tower. In the same year the magazine changed its logo text, with a drawing representing Lauttasaari at the right edge of the text, where the church tower and water tower stood out from the rest of the island as much taller buildings than the rest.

The Lauttasaari magazine had a habit of making April Fools' jokes from the tower especially if the magazine happened to be published on April Fools' Day. In April 1979 the magazine published a headline "Vesitorni kaatuu!" ("The water tower is falling down!"), which said the thawing ground and vibrations from passing traffic had caused the tower to list precariously and would fall down without emergency action.

The Lauttasaari water tower was also present in the 2011 TV series Suojele minua! ("Protect me!") shown on Yle Teema.

=== Dismantling ===
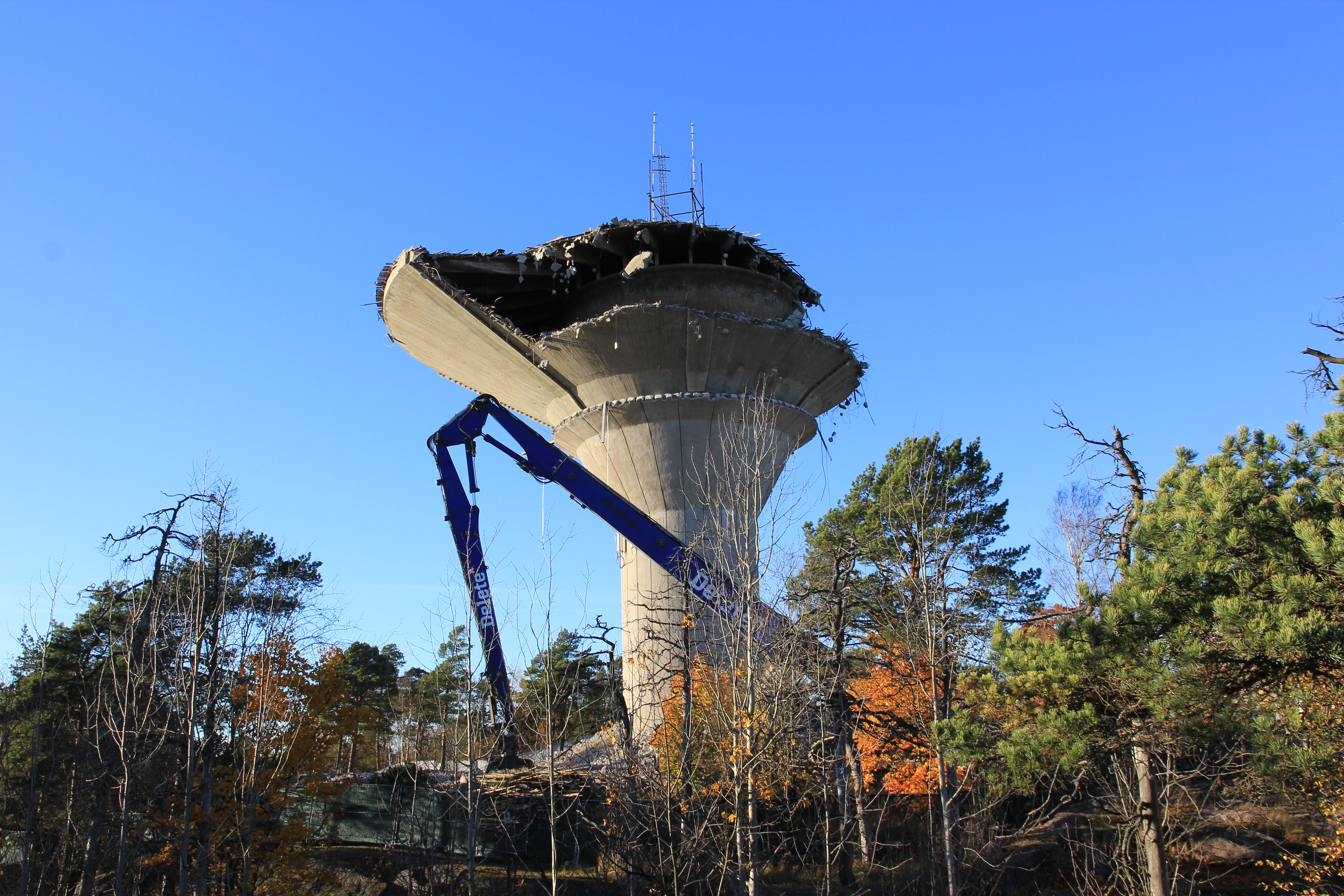
Dismantling the Lauttasaari water tower in October 2015.

After its decommission, new uses for the water tower were sought for a long time. The city of Helsinki was ready to give up the building it had no use for any more, and several entities were interested in the water tower, with plans to convert it into a café, a testing area for rescue equipment, a memorial, or residential apartments. There were no spaces in the water tower that could be converted into apartments, as the conversion work would have been expensive and would probably have required building a new floor.

As well as the actual conversion work, there would have been costs for renovating the tower. The interior of the tower was in pretty good shape except for the original electricity works, but the exterior was badly in need of repair. Plain steel reinforcement was sticking out of the concrete shell of the tower, and bits of concrete had fallen down from it. The foot and middle part of the shaft were also in bad shape.

Further challenges to finding new use for the tower came from its location on the Kotkavuori hill, in the middle of a park on the end of narrow streets lined with apartments. Thus the tower could not be used for anything requiring heavy traffic in the area. Converting the tower into apartments would also have required changing the zoning plan.

The building board made its first suggestion about dismantling the tower in August 2010. Reasons included the poor condition of the tower and the danger it posed to the environment. The city council of Helsinki decided to dismantle the tower in September 2013. No acceptable offer to buy the tower had been received. The dismantling was planned to happen by breaking the concrete into small pieces from March to April 2014. Dismantling the tower started in October 2015 and was completed in November in the same year.
