= Matkalla Porkkalaan =

Matkalla Porkkalaan is a Finnish play. It was written about Ivan Belov and the events before his death in 1944 in the Lauttasaari and was performed in 2006.
