= Hellmaninkupu =

Island in Helsinki, Finland

- Hellmaninkupu on a sunny day

- Location within Helsinki
- Other names: Hellmanskobben, Hellmansgrundet

Geography
- Location: Helsinki, Gulf of Finland
- Coordinates: 60°7′39.00″N 24°50′15.00″E
- Highest elevation: 2 m (7 ft)

Administration
- Finland

Hellmaninkupu (Swedish: Hellmanskobben or Hellmansgrundet) is a small island in Helsinki, Finland. It is located approximately 3.5 kilometres south of Lauttasaari. The highest point is about 2 metres above the sea level.

In Swedish, the island is known as Hellmangrundet or Hellmanskobben.
