= Lauttasaari metro station =

Helsinki Metro station

Lauttasaari Drumsö
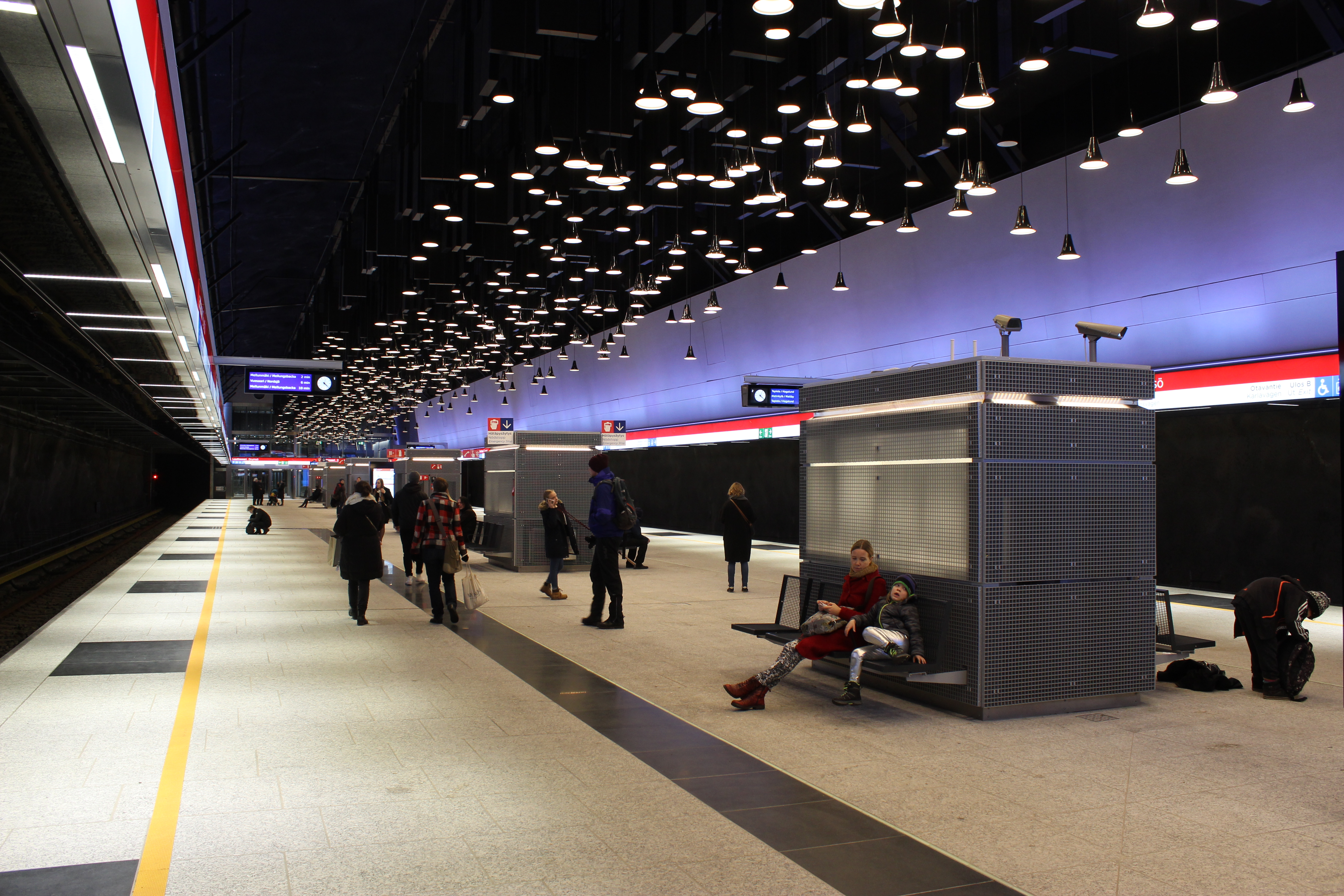
- The Lauttasaari metro station in November 2017.

General information
- Location: Gyldénintie 2a, Helsinki
- Coordinates: 60°09.56′N 24°52.72′E
- System: Helsinki Metro station
- Owner: HKL
- Platforms: Island platform
- Tracks: 2
- Connections: HSL buses 20, 21, 21B, 112N, 115A, 555

Construction
- Structure type: Deep single-vault
- Depth: 30 metres (98 ft)
- Accessible: Yes

Other information
- Fare zone: A

History
- Opened: 18 November 2017

Passengers
- 24,500 daily

Services
Preceding station	Helsinki Metro	Following station
Koivusaari towards Kivenlahti	M1	Ruoholahti towards Vuosaari
Koivusaari towards Tapiola	M2	Ruoholahti towards Mellunmäki
Location

Lauttasaari metro station (Finnish: Lauttasaaren metroasema, Swedish: Drumsös metrostation) is an underground station on the Helsinki Metro. Lauttasaari is a part of the Länsimetro extension. It serves the neighborhood of Lauttasaari in Helsinki. Lauttasaari is served by both lines M1 and M2. There are two entrances to the station, one from the shopping centre Lauttis and one from Gyldénintie street. The station is located 1,6 kilometres east from Koivusaari metro station and 2,2 kilometres west from Ruoholahti metro station.
