= Lauttis =

Shopping centre in Finland

Coordinates: 60.1602°N 24.8816°E

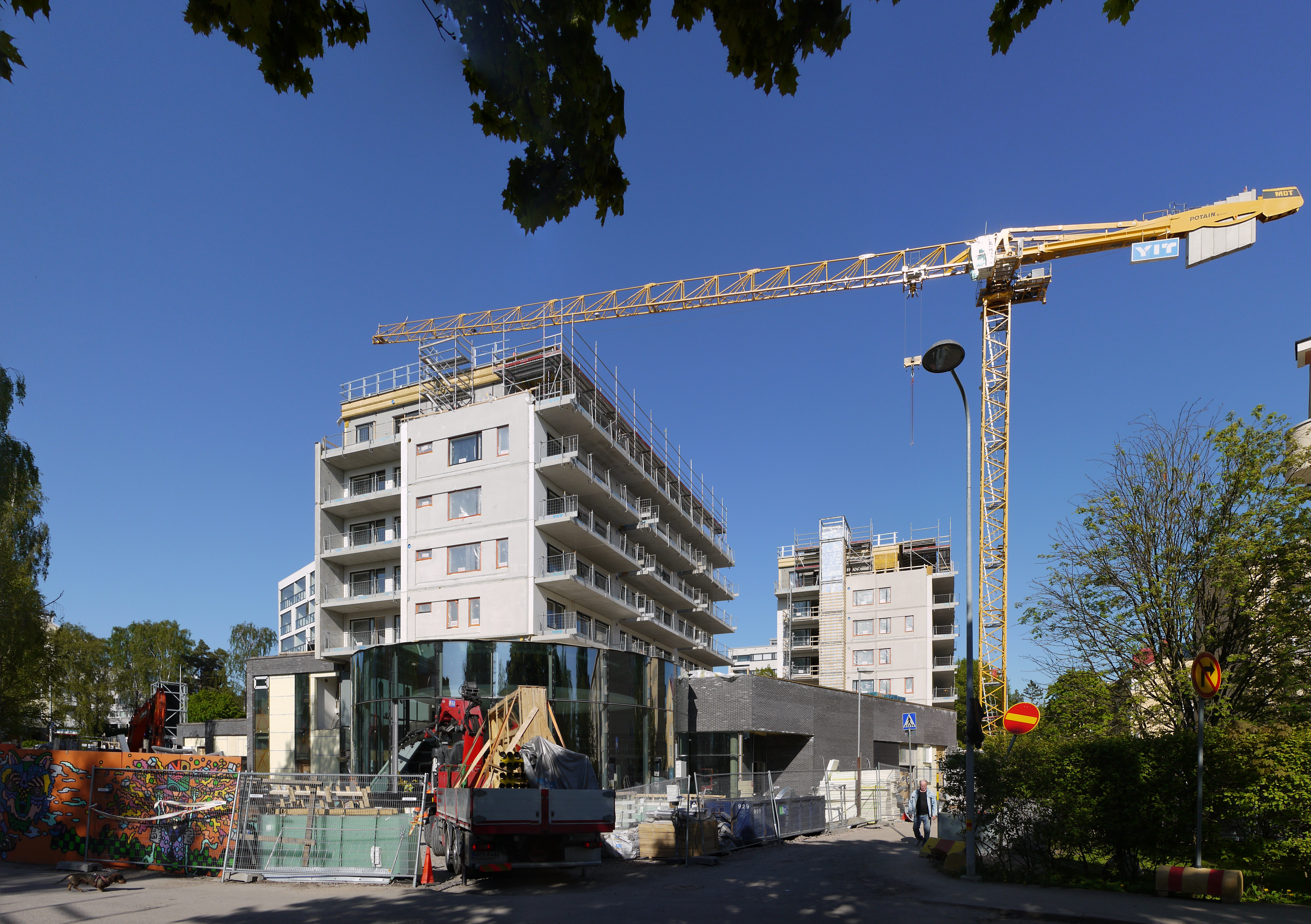
Lauttis under construction in May 2016.

Lauttis is a shopping centre in Lauttasaari, Helsinki, Finland. It was opened on 1 December 2016.

Lauttis is a so-called hybrid building, where the same building houses a parking lot, a shopping centre and apartments. Lauttis has about 6000 m^{2} of business space and about 10000 m^{2} of apartments.

== Businesses and services ==
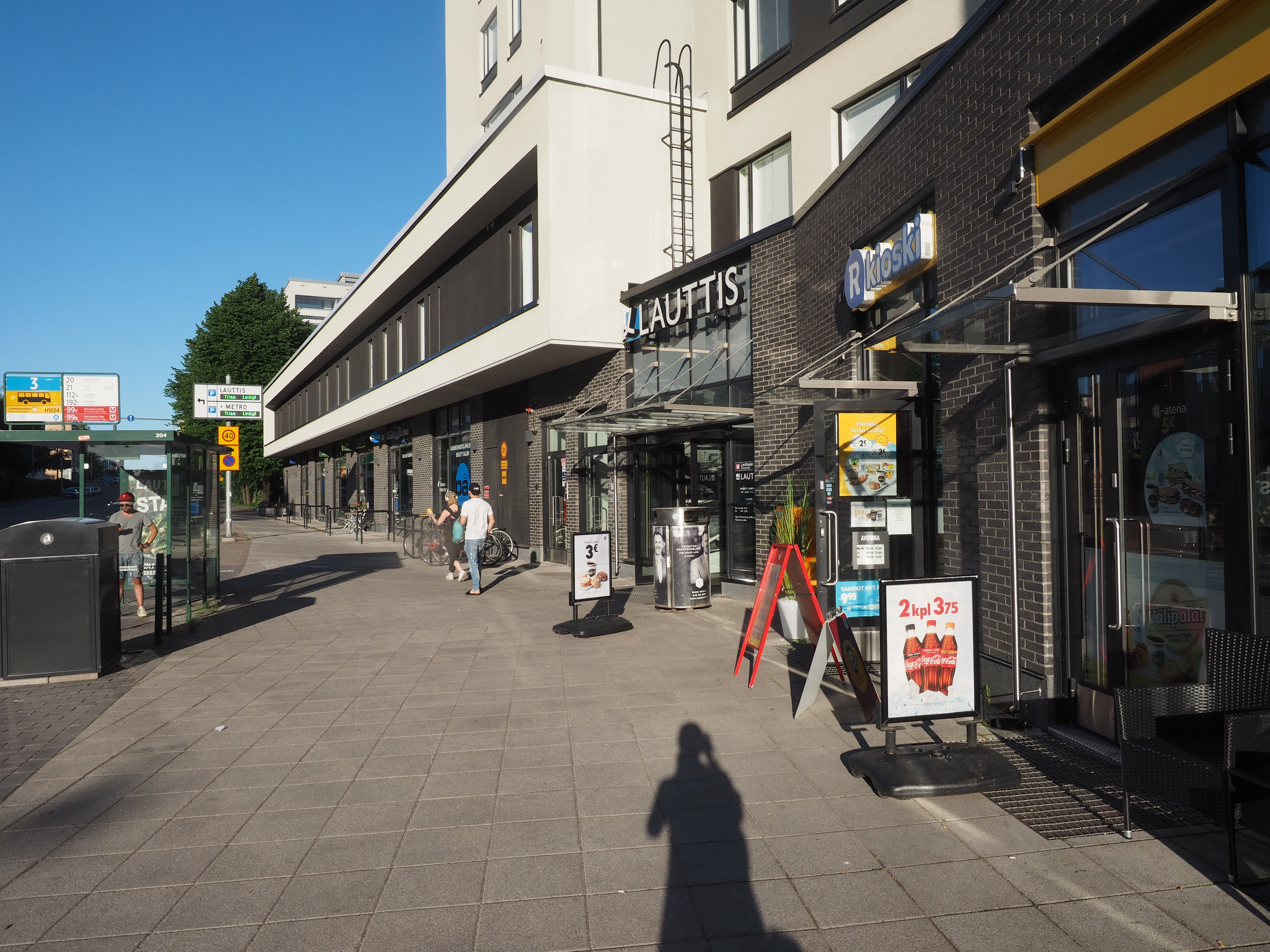
The main entrance to the Lauttis shopping centre.

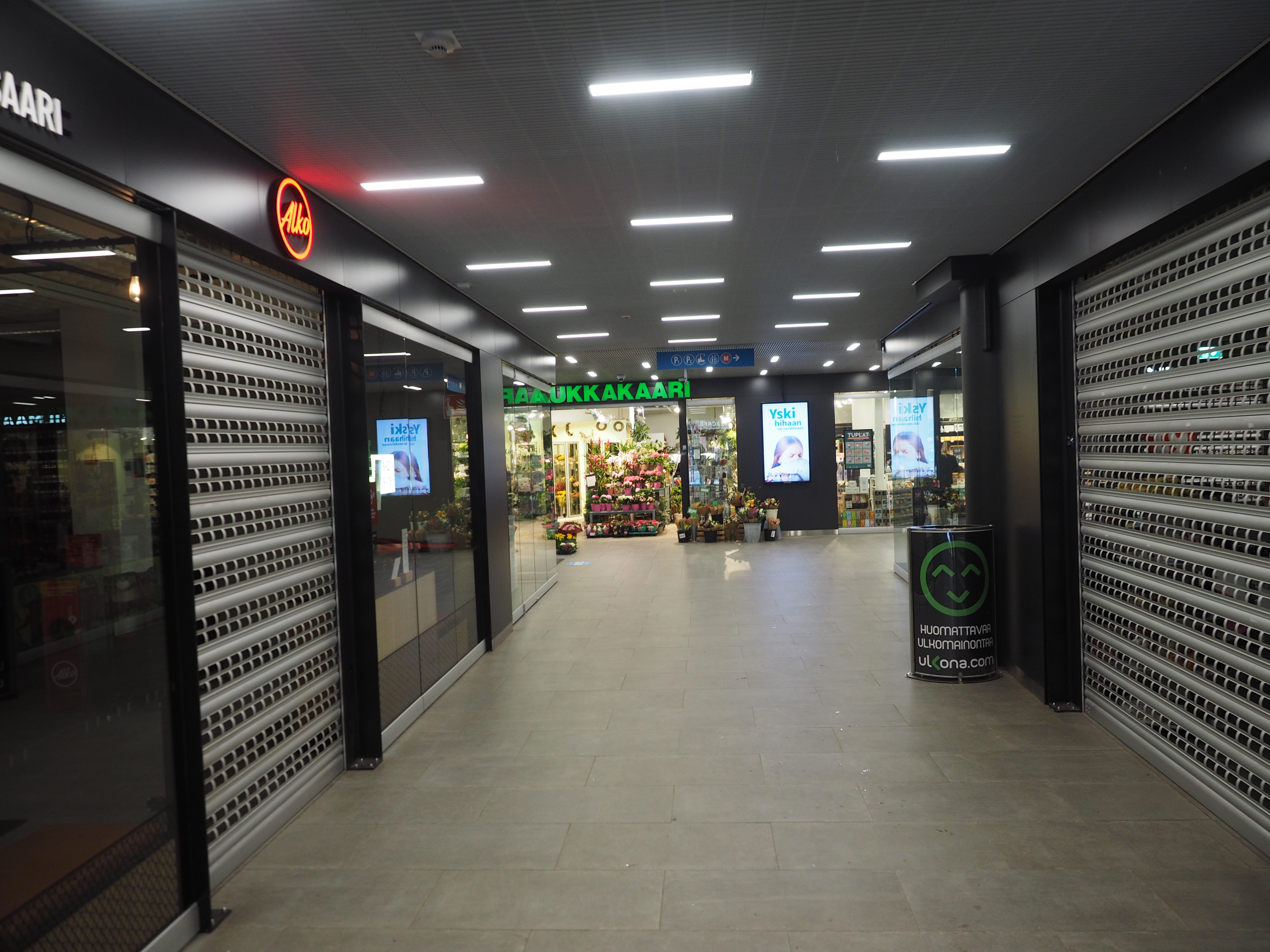
Interior of the Lauttis shopping centre.

The shopping centre has a total of 25 businesses and has a direct connection to the Lauttasaari metro station.

Lauttis includes the food stores K-Supermarket and S-Market, as well as Alko, a pharmacy, the rewarded restaurant Pizzeria Luca, Hanko Sushi, Salaattibaari, Wayne's cafe, Espresso House, a Jungle Juice bar and the Fazer bakery Gateau. The shopping centre also includes the nature product shop Life, the INFO book store, a post office, a Nordea bank office, Erkkeri real estate management, a Kukkakaari flower shop, R-kioski, Filmtown, and the optician shops Instrumentarium and Silmäasema. The list of businesses can be seen on the shopping centre's web page.

The post services of Lauttasaari were moved to the INFO book store in the shopping centre, which replaced Posti's own shop located on Gyldénintie.

140 apartments were built on top of the shopping centre, which were completed in late 2016 and early 2017. A 230-space underground parking lot was also built in connection to the shopping centre. The designer and developer of the parking lot was YIT. The Lauttis area was developed in accordance to YIT's "Kaupunki kylässä" concept.

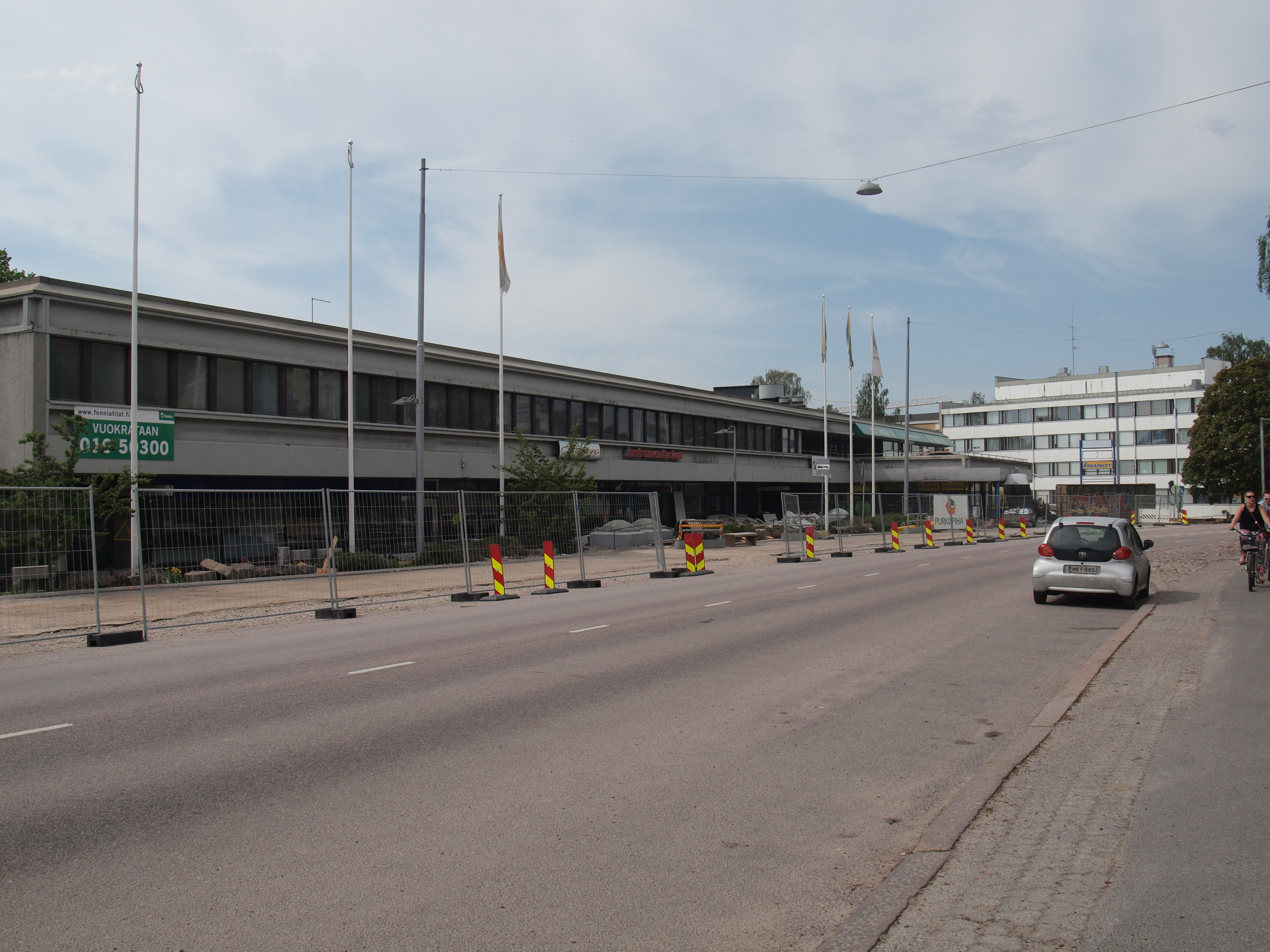
The old Lauttasaari shopping centre in May 2014, after it had been shut down for demolition.

Lauttis was built in place of the old Lauttasaari shopping centre, which was demolished in 2014. K-Supermarket, S-Market, Alko, Instrumentarium and R-kioski were also present in the old shopping centre.

== Environmental certificate ==
The Lauttis shopping centre has been awarded a gold-level LEED gold environmental certificate because of its solution of building heating and modern solutions for control of heating, cooling and lighting.

== Naming competition ==
The name "Lauttis" has a long history dating back to the 1920s. The name "Lauttis" was chosen as the winner of a naming competition held by YIT. Most of the entries were variations of the name Lauttasaari. There were almost 800 entries.

There were four finalists, of which Lauttis received the most votes. 35% of voters supported Lauttis. The naming competition started in the farewell event for the old shopping centre in 2013. At the Lauttasaari days in the next autumn the finalists were revealed, allowing the people to vote for their own favourite.

The name Lauttis is short and compact, and clearly tells people where they are. The old familiar nickname "Laru" for Lauttasaari still remains in use as a nickname for the island as a whole.
