= Koivusaari metro station =

Helsinki Metro station

Coordinates: 60.1636°N 24.8542°E

Koivusaari Björkholmen
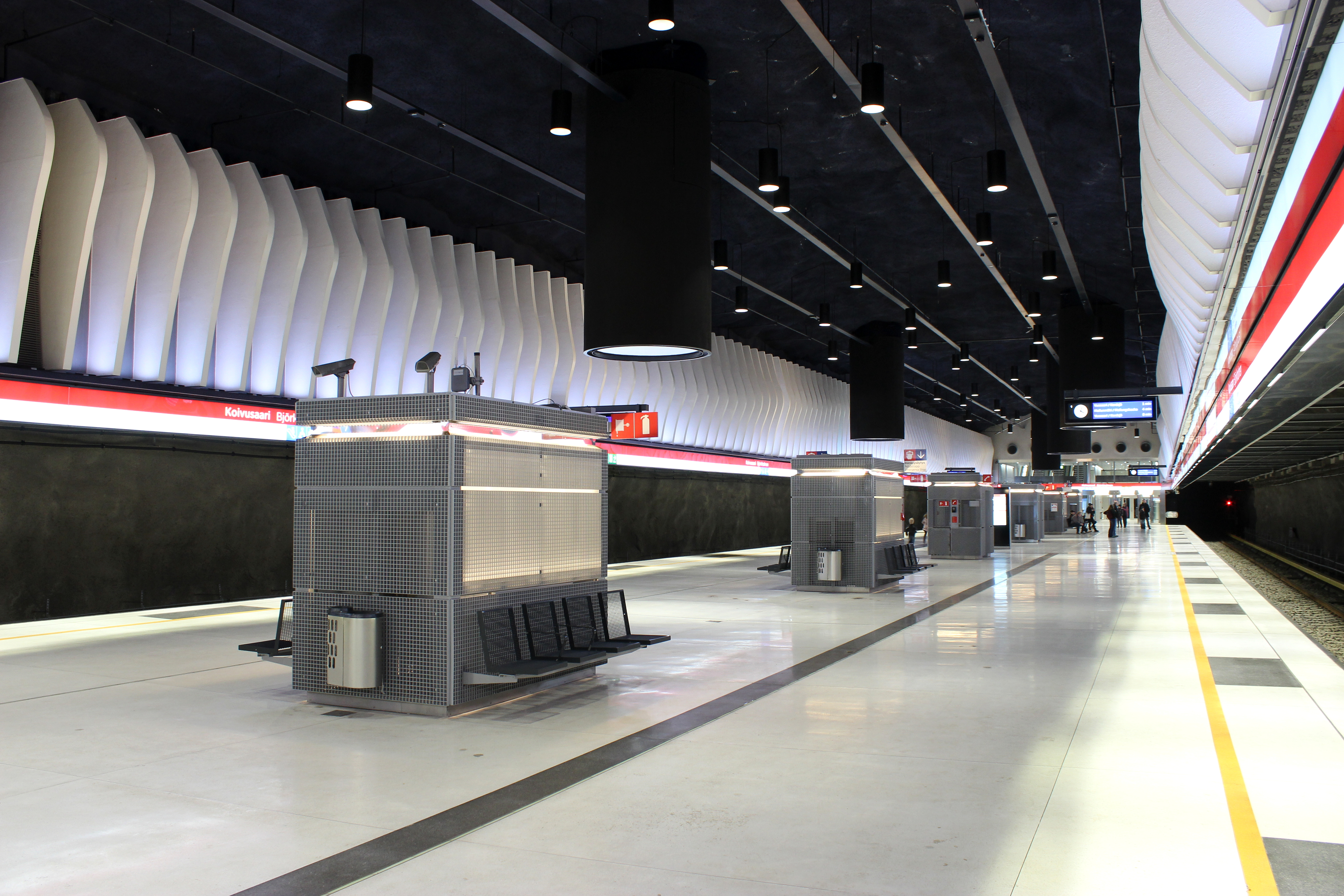
- The Koivusaari metro station in November 2017.

General information
- Location: Sotkatie 12, Helsinki
- System: Helsinki Metro station
- Owner: HKL
- Platforms: island platform
- Tracks: 2
- Connections: HSL buses 21N, 22, 22B, 104, 112N, 192T, 192V

Construction
- Structure type: Deep single-vault
- Depth: 33 metres (108 ft)
- Accessible: Yes

Other information
- Fare zone: A

History
- Opened: 18 November 2017

Passengers
- 4,200 daily

Services
| Preceding station | Helsinki Metro | Following station |
|---|---|---|
| Keilaniemi towards Kivenlahti | M1 | Lauttasaari towards Vuosaari |
| Keilaniemi towards Tapiola | M2 | Lauttasaari towards Mellunmäki |
Location

Koivusaari metro station (Finnish: Koivusaaren metroasema, Swedish: Björkholmens metrostation) is an underwater station on the Länsimetro extension of the Helsinki Metro, in the Otaniemi district of Espoo, Finland.

Although the metro station is named after Koivusaari, the westernmost island in Helsinki, it is actually located on the extreme western edge of the Lauttasaari island. It is located 2.3 kilometres east from Keilaniemi metro station and 1.6 kilometres west from Lauttasaari metro station.

The eastern entrance to Koivusaari metro station is located on Sotkatie in Lauttasaari. The western entrance, on the island of Koivusaari itself, had not been taken into use when the Länsimetro was completed. It is waiting until land use in the area has developed enough.

== History ==
Koivusaari metro station opened in 2017 as part of the Länsimetro extension, and is currently the only metro station in the world located under the sea. The station has 76-metre-long (249 ft) escalators and funicular-style elevators. It is the westernmost metro station in Helsinki. The following station to the west, Keilaniemi, is located in Espoo.

The escalators at Koivusaari metro station are the longest in the entire country in Finland. On weekdays Koivusaari metro station is visited by 4,600 passengers per day on average, which is the lowest number among all stations of Länsimetro and the entire Helsinki Metro.

Koivusaari metro station was temporarily closed for refurbishment – to fix cracks found in the concrete floor of the station – on 1 June 2020 and reopened in August.

== Gallery ==
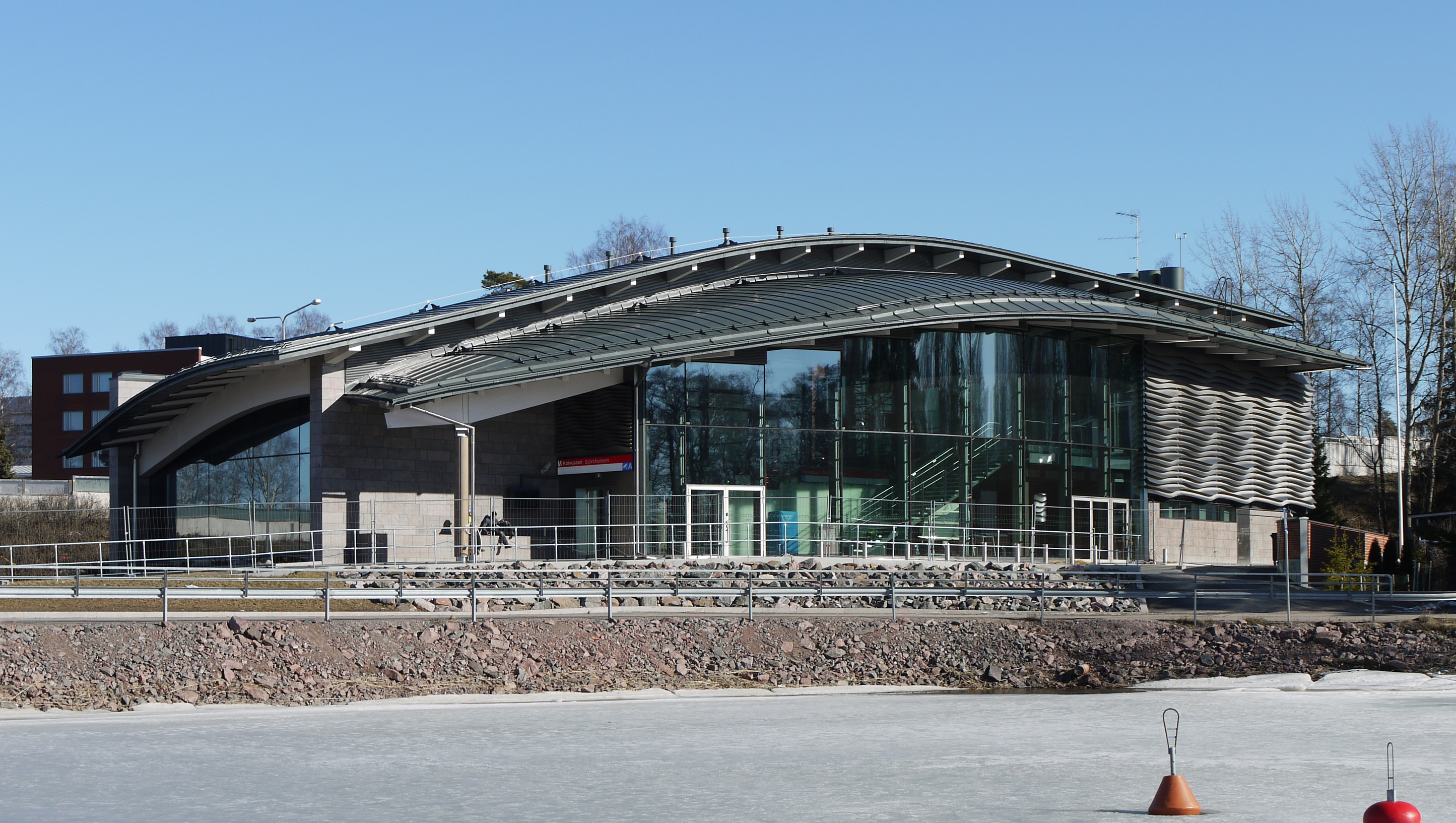
The eastern entrance to Koivusaari metro station

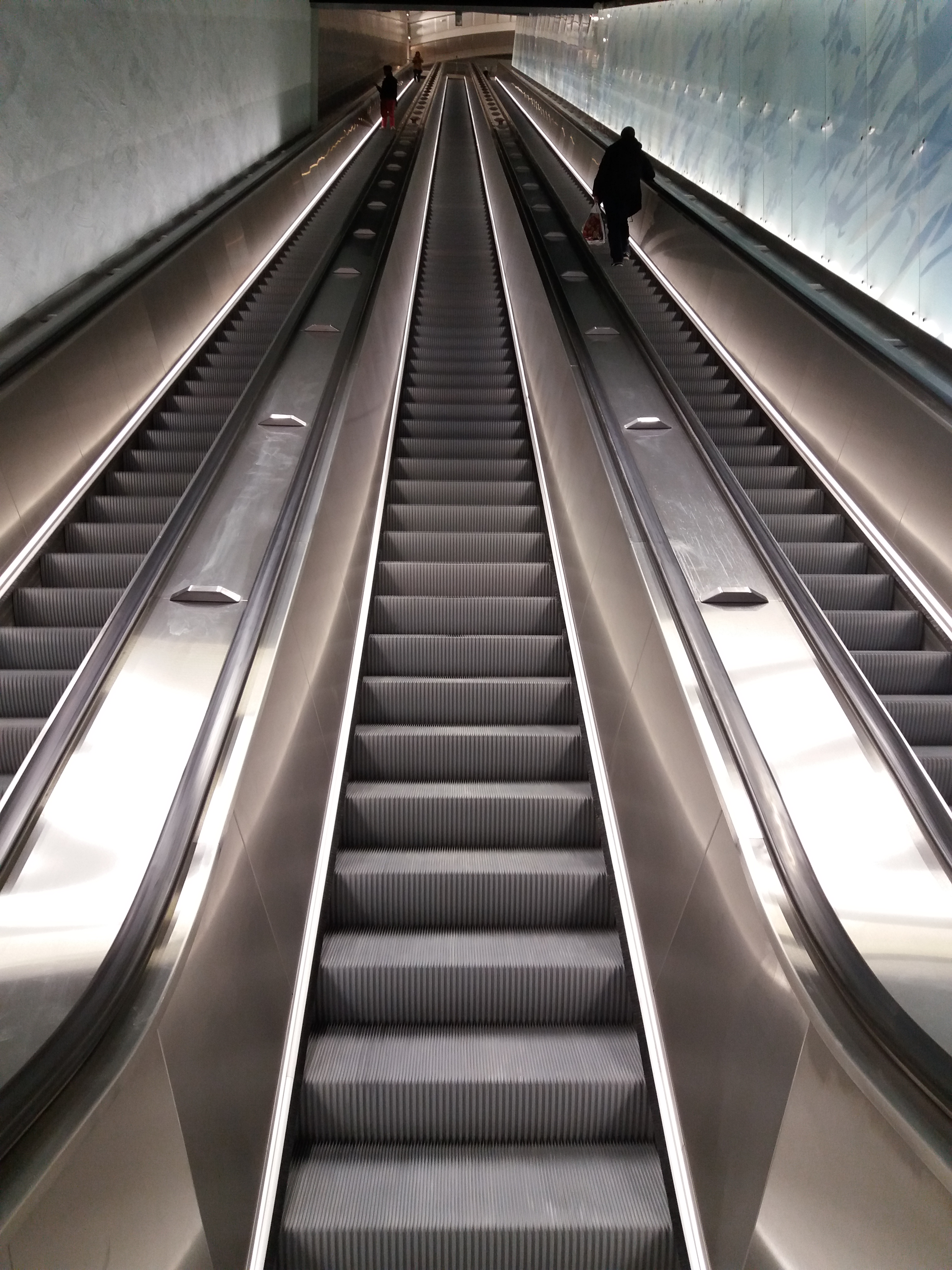
The longest escalators in Finland

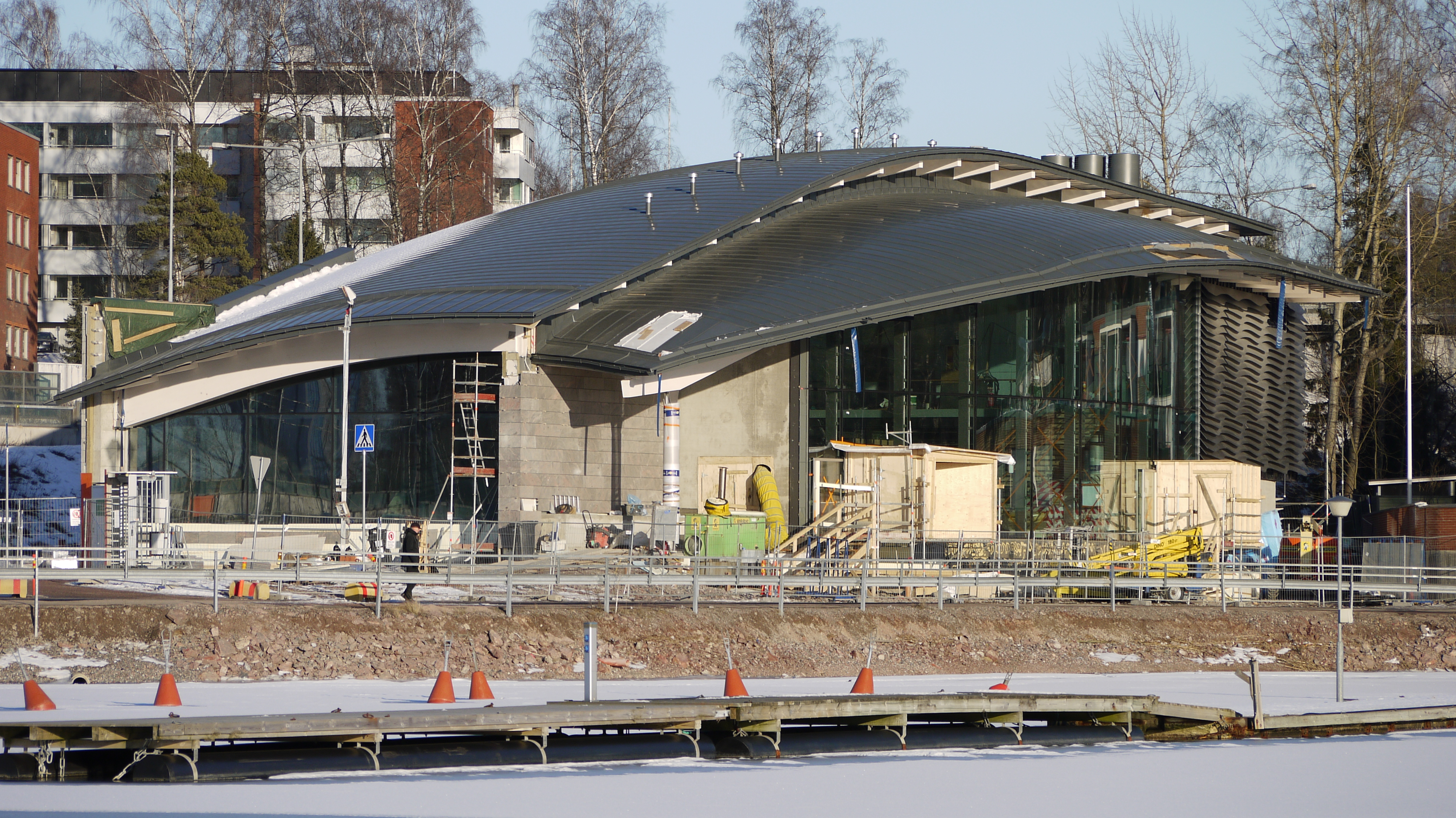
The eastern entrance to the metro station in February 2016

The ticket hall at the Koivusaari metro station
