= Johanna Nordblad =

Finnish freediver

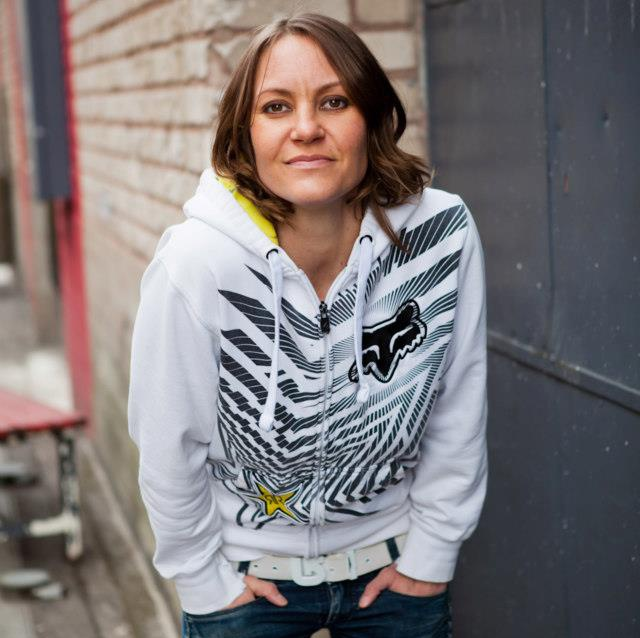

Johanna Nordblad (born 1975) is a Finnish designer, ice diver and freediver.

== Professional career ==
Prior to ice diving, Nordblad started her freediving career in 2000 and has since been competing in the World Championships with the world's best freedivers. In 2004, she broke the female record in freediving with fins (dynamic), swimming 158 metres in 6m 39s. Nordblad also was the Finnish team captain and coach for the men's national freediving team, preparing them for the 2014 World cup in Italy. Her current record in dynamic freediving is 192 m from the 2013 World Championships in Belgrade, Serbia. She also achieved a static breath hold of 6 min 35 sec at the 2015 World Championships in Turku, Finland.

Nordblad had a cycling accident in 2010 in which she broke her leg. She started cold-water treatment (ice therapy) in 2013 upon the recommendation of her doctor. She began freediving under the Arctic ice in the 2000s. In 2015, she broke the Guinness World Record for females on March 14, 2015, diving for 50 metres under the ice in 2 °C cold water of Lake Päijänne, while only wearing a swimsuit and mask. On the 18th of March 2021 Nordblad set a new under ice swimming record by diving 103 metres in Lake Ollori under 60 cm thick ice without fins or wetsuit which was certified by CMAS. Her journey leading up to her world record attempt, which was interrupted by the COVID-19 pandemic, is documented in the Netflix film 'Hold Your Breath: the Ice Dive'.

Nordblad has a history in marketing. She has worked full-time in digital media, printing products, and graphic design. Johanna Nordblad and her sister Elina Manninen, a professional photographer, own the company Greenwater Production. The sisters have produced a variety of lifestyle, adventure and sports related picture books (‘I’m Ok –Freediving’, ‘Paris –Street’, ‘Underwater Picture Book’, ‘Freediving Serbia’, and ‘Helsinki Finland’), as well as short films that capture Johanna's underwater experiences. Since 2017, Nordblad is the Art and Creative Director of the company.

Besides the documentaries from Greenwater Production, Nordblad's diving adventures also appear in the short film Nowness that starred Johanna and Green Water Production co-produced, directed by Ian Derry. National Geographic shared the film on its Facebook page in 2015 and it has since then gone viral.

== Personal life ==
Nordblad resides with her son Kasper on Lauttasaari Island, Helsinki, Finland.
