= Ivan Belov (captain) =

Soviet officer and naval captain

- Born: Ivan Mikhailovich Belo; 1906
- Died: November 3, 1944 (aged 37–38)
- Allegiance: Soviet Union
- Branch: Soviet Navy
- Conflicts: Second World War

Ivan Mikhailovich Belov (1906–1944) was a Soviet officer and naval captain. He was a victim of the Helsinki Lauttasaari incident on November 3, 1944. He is the main subject of a Finnish play, Matkalla Porkkalaan.

== See also ==
- List of unsolved murders (1900–1979)
