= Ruoholahti metro station =

Helsinki Metro station

Ruoholahti Gräsviken
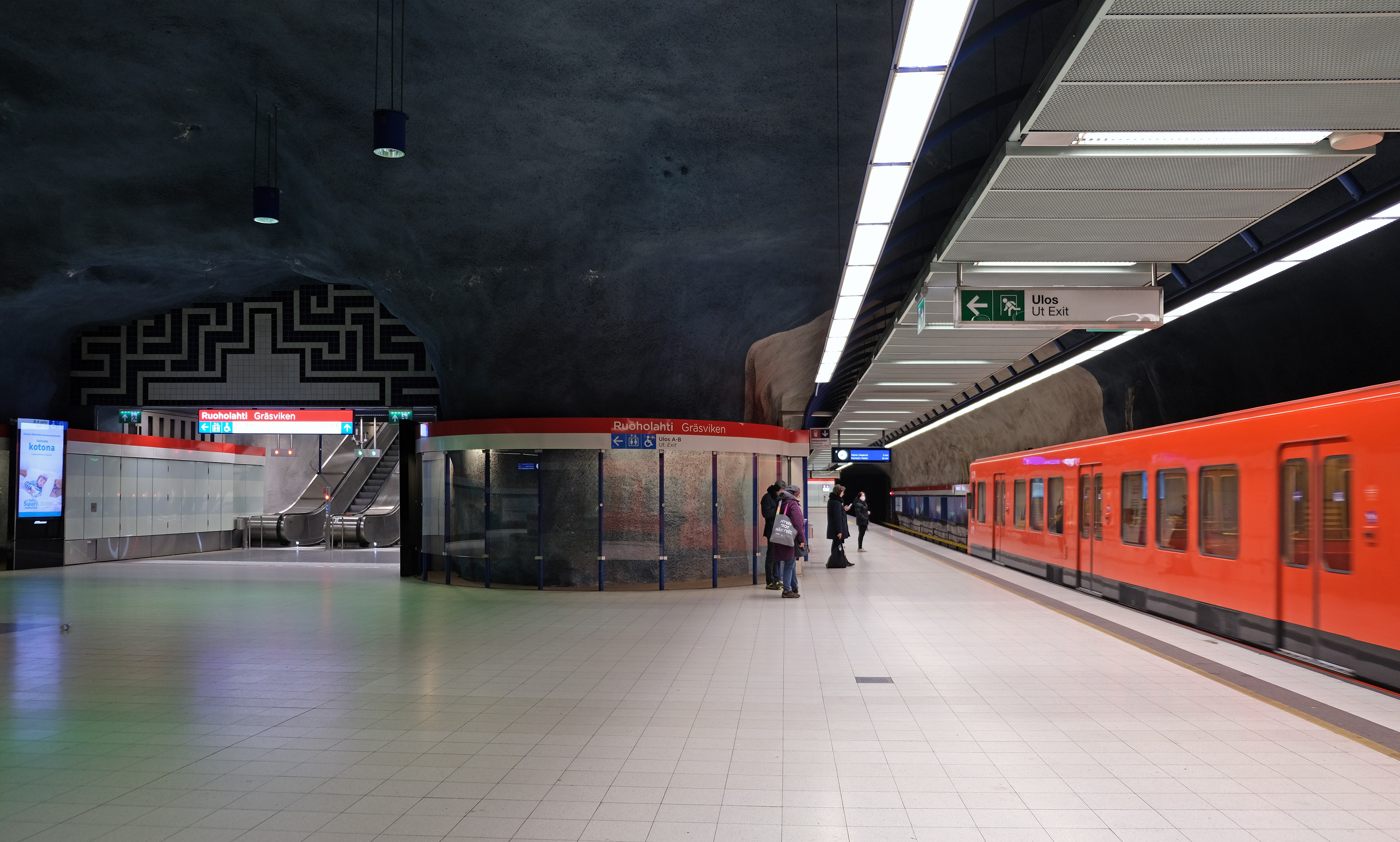
- The Ruoholahti metro station

General information
- Location: Itämerenkatu 14, Helsinki
- Coordinates: 60°09′47″N 024°54′52″E
- System: Helsinki Metro station
- Owner: HKL
- Platforms: island platform
- Tracks: 2
- Connections: Helsinki tram line 8 Helsinki buses 15 20 20N

Construction
- Structure type: Underground
- Depth: 26 metres (85 ft)
- Parking: 140
- Cycle facilities: 72
- Accessible: Yes

Other information
- Fare zone: A

History
- Opened: 16 August 1993

Passengers
- 32,500 daily

Services
Preceding station	Helsinki Metro	Following station
Lauttasaari towards Kivenlahti	M1	Kamppi towards Vuosaari
Lauttasaari towards Tapiola	M2	Kamppi towards Mellunmäki
Location

Ruoholahti metro station (Finnish: Ruoholahden metroasema, Swedish: Gräsvikens metrostation - "Grassy Bay") is a station on the Helsinki Metro. There are 72 bicycle and 140 car parking spaces at Ruoholahti. It serves the district of Ruoholahti in central Helsinki. Ruoholahti is served by both lines M1 and M2. It was the western endpoint of the metropolitan line for over 24 years until the 1st phase of the western phase was completed and the undergrounds of Matinkylä started on 18 November 2017.

The station was opened on 16 August 1993 and was designed by Jouko Kontio and Seppo Kilpiä. Ruoholahti is located 1.2 kilometers western of Kamppi and 2.2 kilometres eastern of Lauttasaari.

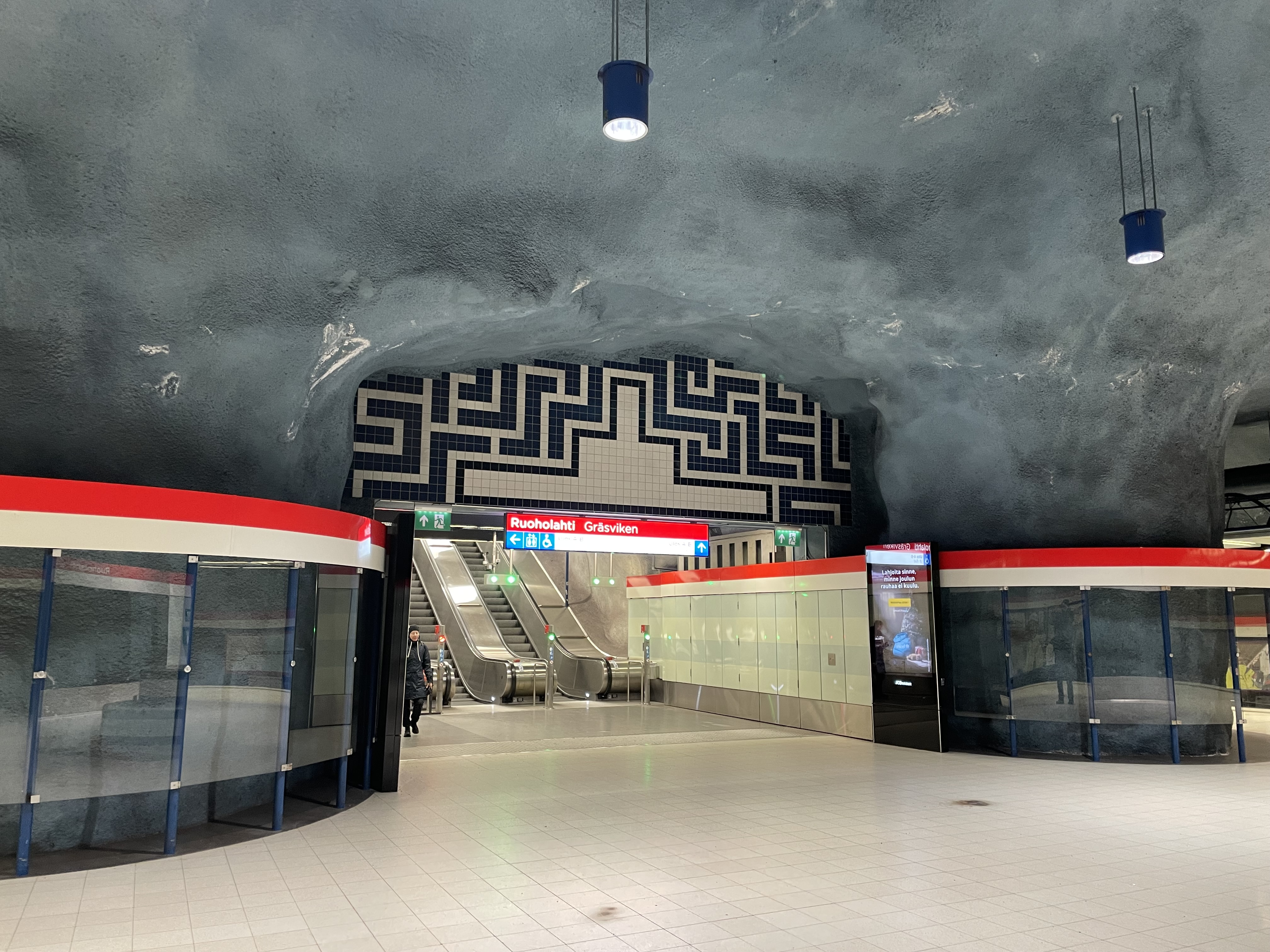
Escalators and the platform at Ruoholahti station

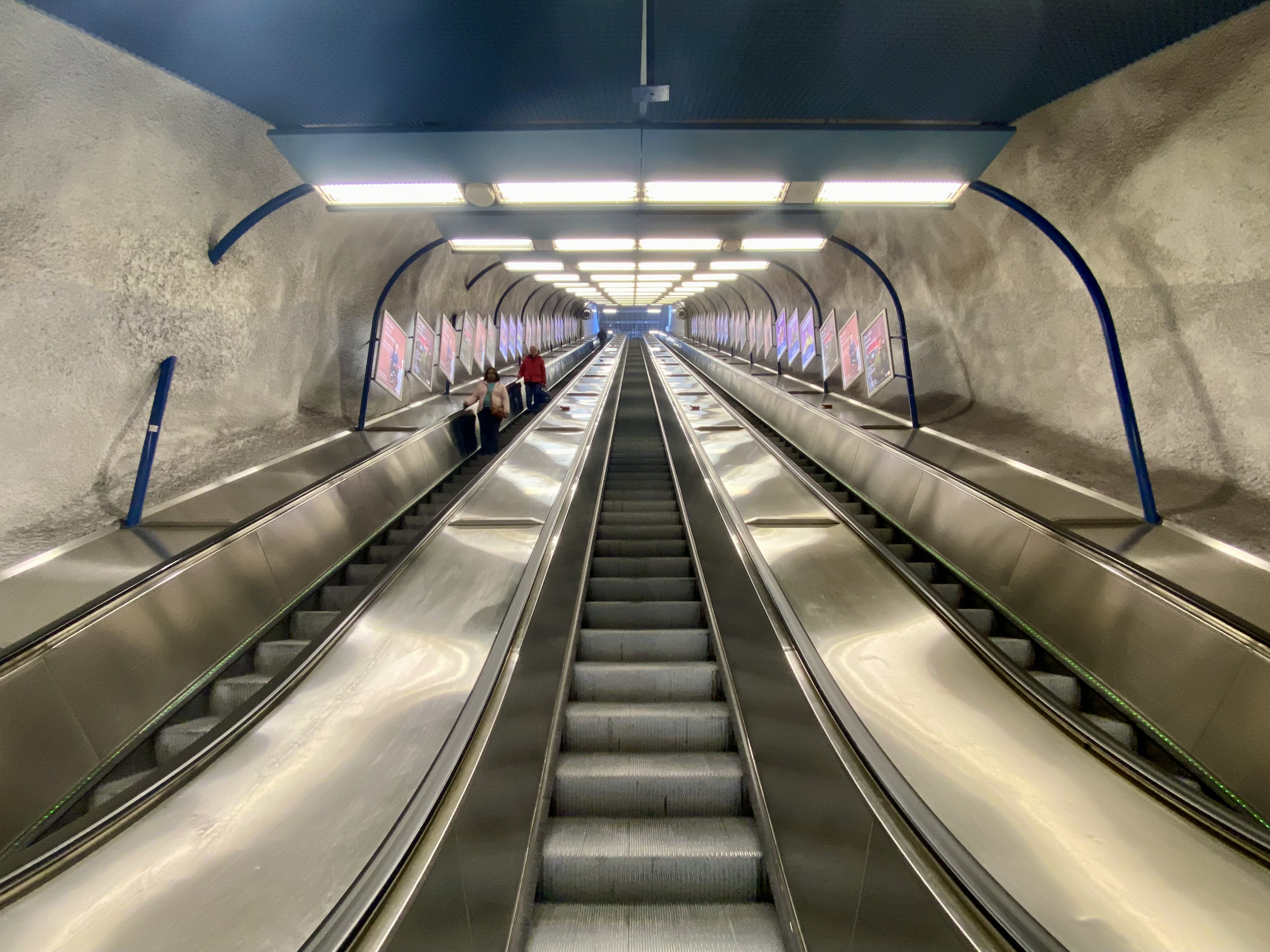
Metro station escalators

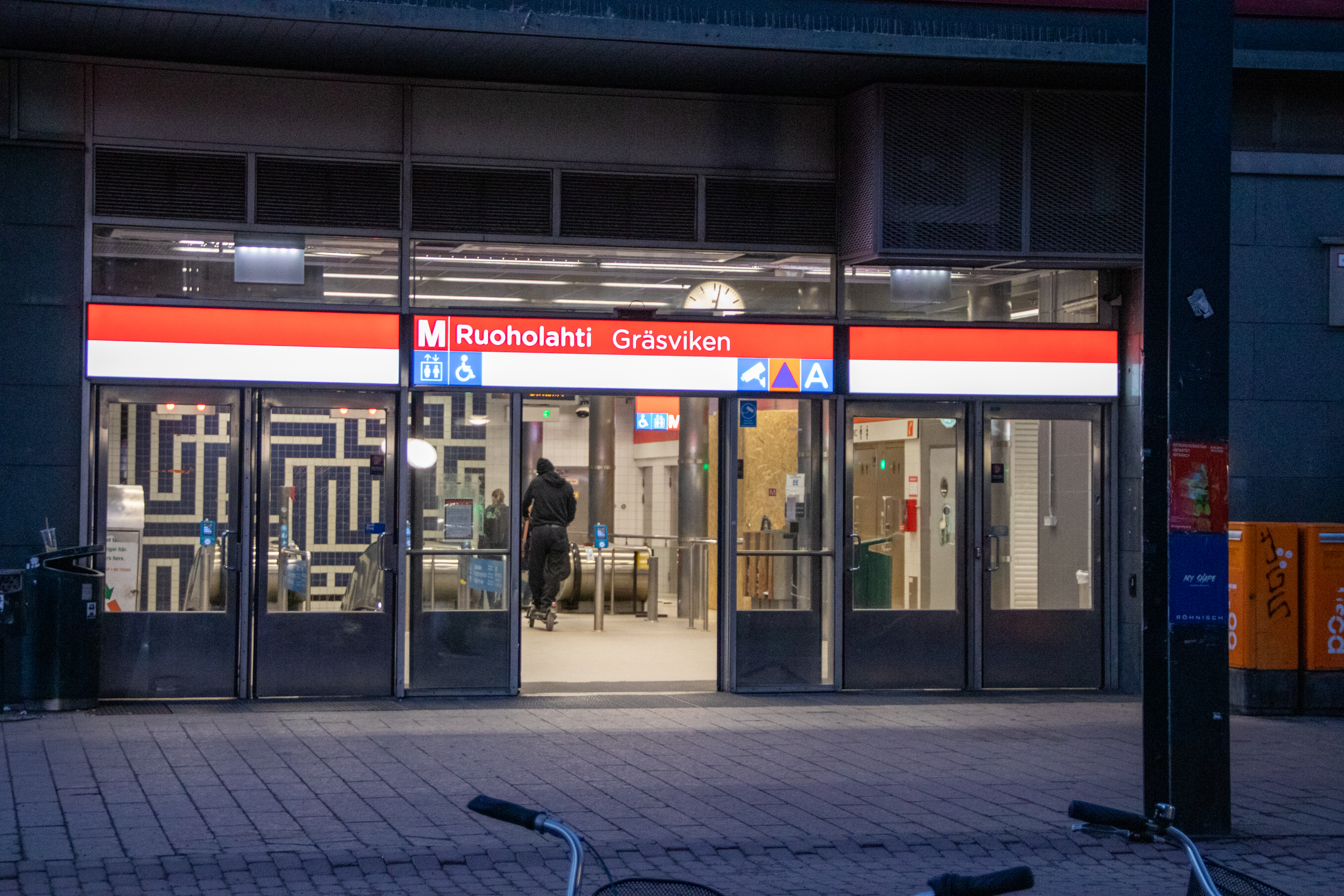
Metro station entrance
