= Lauttasaari bridge =

Road bridge in Helsinki, Finland

Coordinates: 60°09′39.6″N 24°53′45.6″E

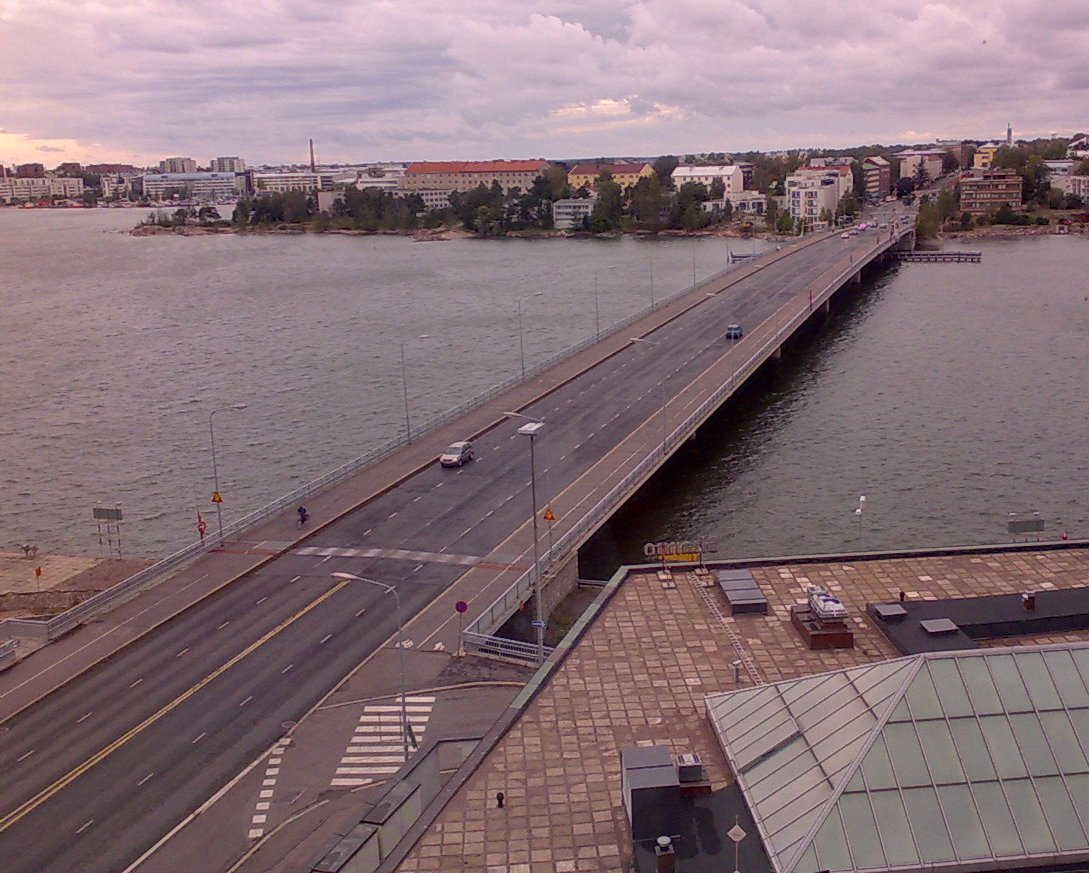
The Lauttasaari bridge seen from the Helsinki Court House.

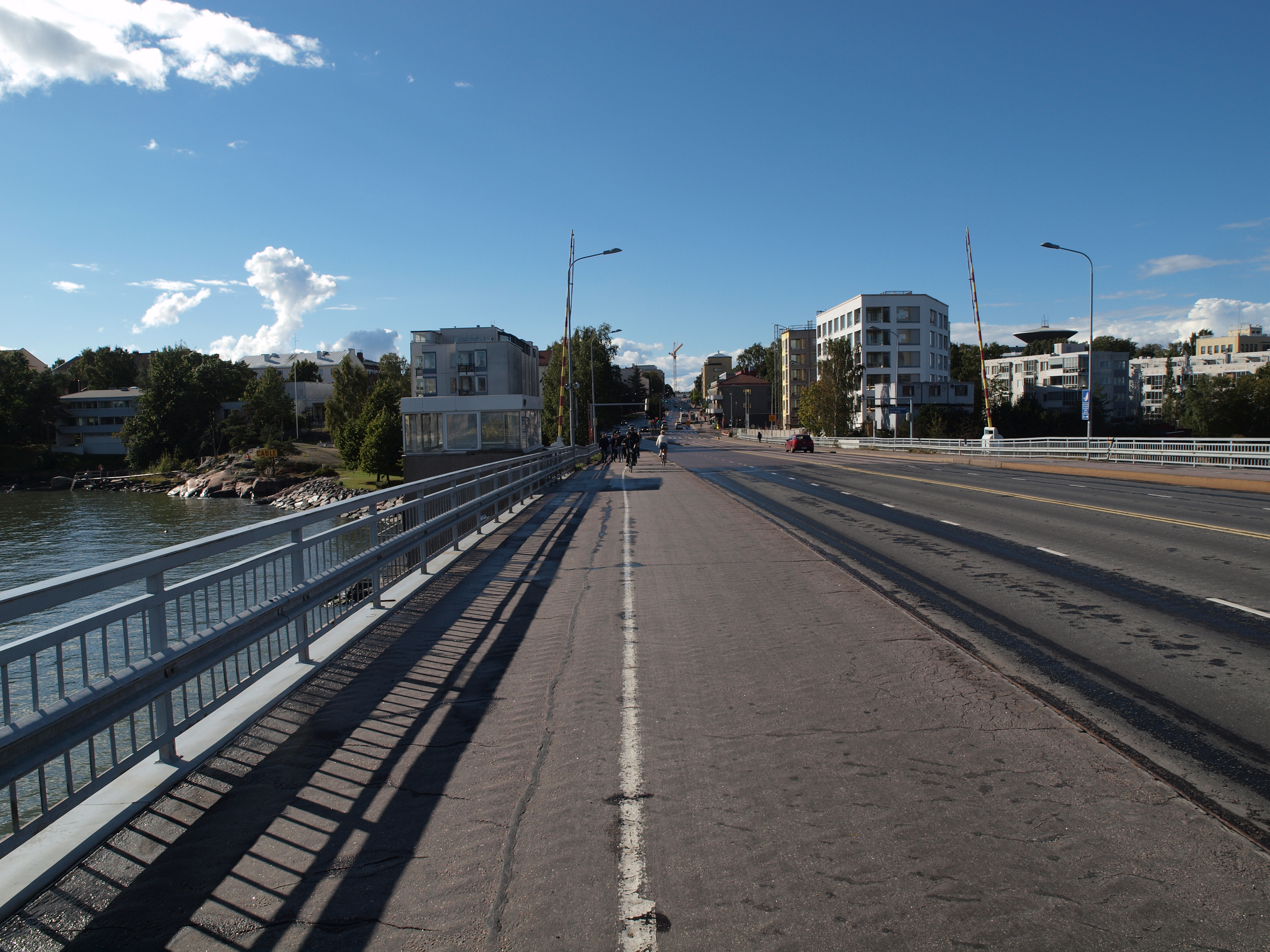
A view along the bridge.

The Lauttasaari bridge (Finnish: Lauttasaaren silta, Swedish: Drumsö bro) is a bridge in Helsinki, Finland, over the Lauttasaarensalmi strait. The bridge connects the island of Lauttasaari to mainland Helsinki. The mainland end is in Salmisaari in the Ruoholahti district, with the Porkkalankatu street leading to the city centre. In Lauttasaari, the street Lauttasaarentie leads west from the bridge.

The current bridge was built in late December 1969. The bridge is 317 metres long and 23.5 metres wide, made of reinforced concrete, and its span is 56.6 metres.

The bridge is an openable bascule bridge, but nowadays it is only opened on rare exceptional occasions. Formerly it used to be opened regularly to allow large cargo ships to transport coal to the pier of the Salmisaari power plant underneath it. Nowadays the coal harbour of the plant has been moved to the south of the bridge, where the coal is transported to a larger storage space underneath the plant, built in 2004, via an underground tunnel.

The bridge has also become a popular spot for fishing Baltic herring.

== Old bridge ==
The first Lauttasaari bridge was built in 1935. At the same time, the Jorvaksentie road leading west of Lauttasaari, predecessor of the Länsiväylä highway, was built. Before the bridge there had been a ferry at the same time since 1914. The octagonal building Mutterikioski building was built to serve the ferry passengers. The building currently servers as a café. The ferry connection is also related to the island's name, as Lauttasaari means "ferry island" in Finnish.

As the population of Lauttasaari grew in the 1950s with further construction and new residential districts such as Tapiola were built in southern Espoo, the old bridge soon became too narrow. Large traffic jams appeared on both sides of the bridge. The situation eased significantly when the Lapinlahti bridge, part of Länsiväylä, was built north of the bridge in 1965.

The old Lauttasaari bridge was dismantled in the winter from 1967 to 1968 and construction of the new bridge started soon afterwards. It was completed in late December 1969. There was a temporary wooden pedestrian bridge to the north of the bridge during its construction.
