= Lauttasaari =

Island in Helsinki, Finland

Coordinates: 60°09′36″N 24°52′12″E

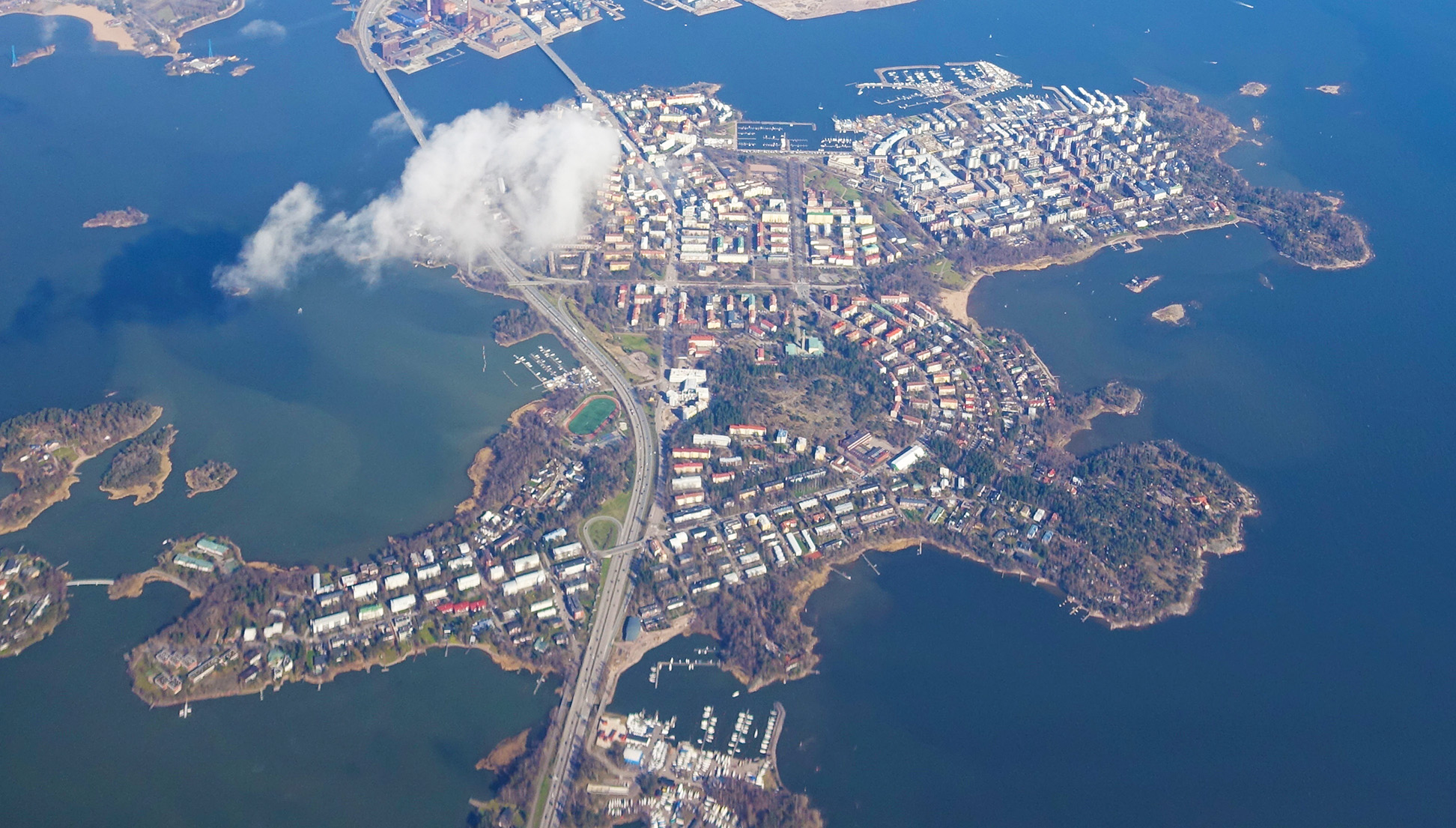
Aerial view of Lauttasaari

Lauttasaari in Helsinki area

Lauttasaari (Finnish: [ˈlɑu̯tːɑˌsɑːri]; Swedish: Drumsö) is an island in Helsinki, Finland, about 3 kilometres (1.9 mi) west of the city centre. Together with some surrounding unpopulated small islands, Lauttasaari is also a district of Helsinki. With 23,226 residents as of 2017, the island is Finland's second largest by population, after Fasta Åland. Its land area is 3.85 km^{2}.

Lauttasaari is primarily a residential area but also contains services, including several marinas and canoe clubs. Although close to the city centre, Lauttasaari has not been entirely built up. Notably, almost the entire shoreline remains in public use, with footpaths, beaches, playgrounds, patches of forest, and rocky outcrops.

The name Lauttasaari literally means "ferry island", although nowadays, the island is connected to the rest of Helsinki and to the city of Espoo by bridges, causeways, and the Helsinki metro, which has two stations in the district. The island has two postal codes: 00200 and 00210.

Lauttasaari map

== Etymology ==
The island of Lauttasaari has probably been a recreational area for the Finns even before the Middle Ages and it has had a Finnish name. This name was abandoned when a Swedish colonist built a house on the island. Some of the Swedish place names have preserved original Finnish place names, such as Lemisholm and Porovik.

The name of the island is first mentioned in 1540 (486 years ago) as Drommensöö, in 1543 as Drommensby and in 1556 as Dromansöö and Dromssöö, which has led to its current name Drumsö. The name has traditionally been seen as coming from the Swedish language nickname Drumber meaning a fat and clumsy person.

In the 2000s it was proposed that the name is based on the Gaelic-Saxon word drum meaning a moraine hill (cf. the geological term drumlin). Thus the name would come from the Vikings on the shores of Finland.

The Finnish name Lauttasaari was taken into use in 1919 and refers to the ferry traffic between the island and mainland Helsinki at the time. The steam ferry Drumsö owned by Julius Tallberg was in traffic between Ruoholahti and Lauttasaari from 1914 to 1936. After the bridge was completed the ferry was lengthened at a dock, and in 1941 it was transferred to a new service as a Korkeasaari ferry. In 1945 the ship was donated as war reparations to the Soviet Union.

== History ==
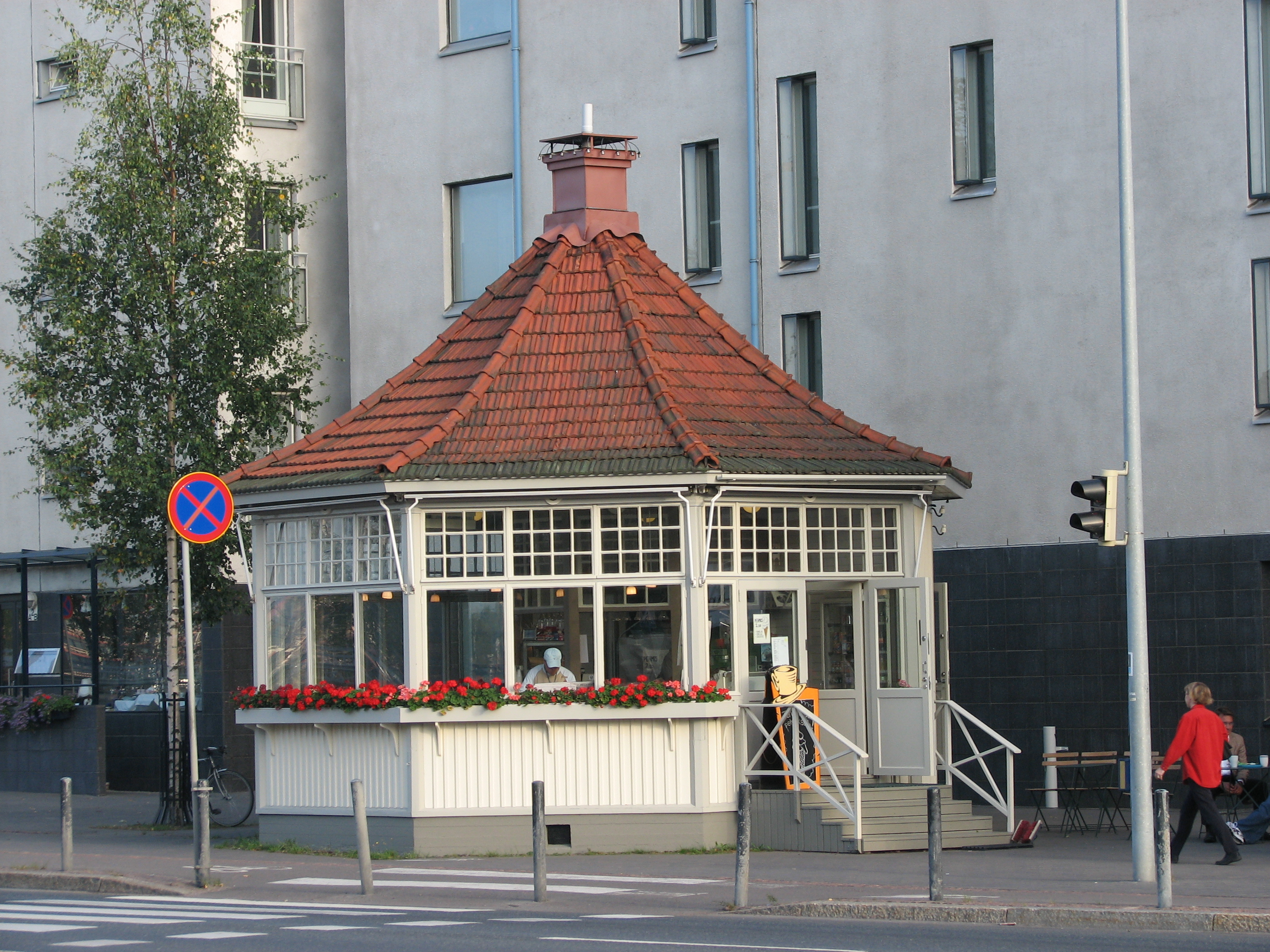
Mutteri café in Lauttasaari.

There used to be two farms in Lauttasaari, Heikas and Bertas. In 1650 Queen Christina donated the island to the city of Helsinki, but this donation was revoked during the Great Reduction and the farms were returned to private ownership. They were later combined into the Lauttasaari manor, whose current main building was commissioned by Claes Wilhelm Gyldén in 1837.

The southernmost part of Lauttasaari was taken into the use of the Russian military during the Crimean War. No garrison was founded in Lauttasaari, but fortifications and ammunition depots of the coastal artillery were built on the island. After Finland became independent the areas was owned by the state of Finland, but as the Finnish Defence Forces had no use for the area, in 1927 it was transferred to the city of Helsinki, which founded a folkpark in the area.

During the Winter War and the Continuation War an anti-aircraft battery against the bombing of Helsinki was situated on Myllykallio in Lauttasaari. During the Continuation War the battery was armed with six heavy anti-aircraft cannons. One of these cannons was revealed as a memorial monument on Myllykallio on 12 June 1980. The leading battery of the southwestern sector was located in Veijarivuorenniemi in Lauttasaari, of which one cannon has been preserved on site as a memorial monument.

=== Julius Tallberg era and early building plans ===
The pace of the development of Lauttasaari has been set by traffic connections. In the early 20th century the island was only inhabited by farms and villas. In 1911 Julius Tallberg bought the Lauttasaari manor for 750 thousand Finnish markka, whose lands covered about half of the island. Tallberg tried to sell the lands to the city of Helsinki, but as the city did not expect its lands to spread to the island, the deal failed. Tallberg started developing the island by himself and hired Birger Brunila to make a building plan. According to the plan, the island would be mostly built as a villa town, but it took over 20 years before this plan was put to action. Tallberg founded a marine spa and a café named Drumsö Casino on the island. From 1913 to 1917 the island was also served by a horse-drawn tram, trafficking from the ferry pier at the start of the current Lauttasaarentie street to Katajaharjunniemi.

According to Eliel Saarinen's 1918 Pro Helsingfors plan a large part of Lauttasaari would be designated as a harbour area, with a train connection from the Leppävaara railway station at the current sites of Ring I and Länsiväylä. Nothing ever became of this plan.

=== Municipal history ===
In 1919 Lauttasaari and Munkkiniemi were separated from the rural municipality of Helsinki to form the municipality of Huopalahti (Hoplax). In 1917 Lauttasaari had been formed as a tightly populated community. Together with the rest of Huopalahti, Lauttasaari was annexed to the city of Helsinki on 1 January 1946. The congregation of Lauttasaari had been annexed to Helsinki already a few years earlier, to the northern Finnish-speaking and the northern Swedish-speaking congregations in Helsinki in 1939.

=== The significance of the Lauttasaari bridge to the development of the island ===
When the Lauttasaari bridge was completed in 1935 the island underwent great changes. Birger Brunila's 1913 plan was finally put the action and the first apartment buildings were built on the fields of the manor. At the same time, a new main street Jorvaksentie was built as a westward extension of the main street Lauttasaarentie running all the way through the island. The current zoning plan of the island is mostly based on Brunila's original plan, although a few of the building blocks designed at the time have been left as parks, and the construction of the Länsiväylä highway has required significant changes to the zoning plans of the western and northern parts of the island.

== Largest peninsulas ==
=== Vattuniemi ===
Vattuniemi is an area in the southern part of the island of Lauttasaari. Vattuniemi was built in the 1940s and 1950s as an industrial area, with diverse corporate activity such as the factory of Suomen Tupakka ("Finnish Tobacco") which ceased activities in 1995. Other former factories in the area include the Hellberg radio factory (Oy Radio E Hellberg Ab), the wood veneer factory of Mahogany Oy and the glue factory of Eri Oy. The area has also included the head offices of Helkama and Lääketukku.

There are still numerous businesses in the Vattuniemi industrial area, such as Solar Films. Since the 1970s the Vattuniemi area has changed significantly. The change has continued strongly in the 21st century. Many industrial and office buildings in the area have been dismantled and replaced with apartment buildings. This has caused the population of Vattuniemi to quickly increase, and the number of jobs to decrease. The selection of services in the area has grown, and it includes grocery stores (S-Market, K-Supermarket, Lidl), numerous restaurants, cafés, health clubs and specialist stores concentrating on boating supplies especially along the street Veneentekijäntie.

=== Katajaharju ===
Katajaharju is a peninsula in the northwestern part of Lauttasaari, and it is now considered a part of the Myllykallio area.

Katajaharju is located entirely to the north of the Länsiväylä highway. The houses on the shore areas of Katajaharju are terraced houses or detached houses with large lots. The buildings in the middle part of the peninsula mostly consist of apartment buildings built in the 1960s.

Katajaharju is connected to the island of Kaskisaari via a walking bridge.

== Greenspaces and refreshment ==
The largest greenspace in Lauttasaari is the former military area of the Veijarivuori park in the southernmost part of the island, also known as "Ryssänkari". The highest cliff on the island, Myllykallio, is also a greenspace with great views in various directions.

The island has two public beaches, of which the so-called Kasinonranta beach is located in the Merikylpylä park and the Veijarivuori beach is located at the southern tip of the island.

The island also has numerous marinas in its eastern, western and northern parts.

== Buildings and architecture ==
=== Public buildings ===
Public buildings built in the 1950s include the Lauttasaari church and the Lauttasaari school, which consists of two buildings (the Pajalahti school and the Myllykallio school), There is also a Swedish-language elementary school (Drumsö lågstadieskola) which was built in 1949.

The Lauttasaari church was inaugurated on 20 September 1958. It was designed by the professor Keijo Petäjä, living in Lauttasaari. The bell tower of the church was taken into use in autumn 1957. The basic repairs of the church are estimated to be complete in spring 2022 after a year and a half of renovations. Until then the Finnish and Swedish speaking congregations of Lauttasaari work at a temporary location in the former premises of the Nokia Oyj research centre in Vattuniemi.

The Lauttasaari water tower was built in 1958 and was dismantled in late 2015.

The current building of the Lauttasaaren Yhteiskoulu school was taken into use in 1968. The building was last expanded in 2019 with an expansion including spaces for physical exercise.

Lauttasaari also has a community health center, a swimming pool, a sports field and a library.

=== Other buildings ===
The Lauttasaari manor building, currently owned by the Kone Foundation, is located in Lauttasaari.

Many of the apartment buildings built in 1950s along the Isokaari street were designed by Else Aropaltio.

== Inhabitants and apartments ==
Of the inhabitants in Lauttasaari, 79.0% are Finnish-speaking, 13.6% are Swedish-speaking and 7.4% speak another language. Of the population over 25 years old 70.6% have a higher education diploma (as of 31 December 2018).

Most of the residential buildings in Lauttasaari are apartment buildings. The median size of apartments in Lauttasaari is 63.3 square metres. Most apartments have two bedrooms. Most of the apartments were built in the 1950s and 1960s; apartment construction in the area diminished in the 1970s, until new apartments started being built especially in the Vattuniemi area in the 2000s. 35.7% of the apartments in Lauttasaari are rental apartments. In 2019 the median price for apartments in the postal code area 00200 was 6102 euro per square metre and in the Vattuniemi postal code area 5976 euro, when the median in the city of Helsinki was 4323 euro.

== Transportation ==
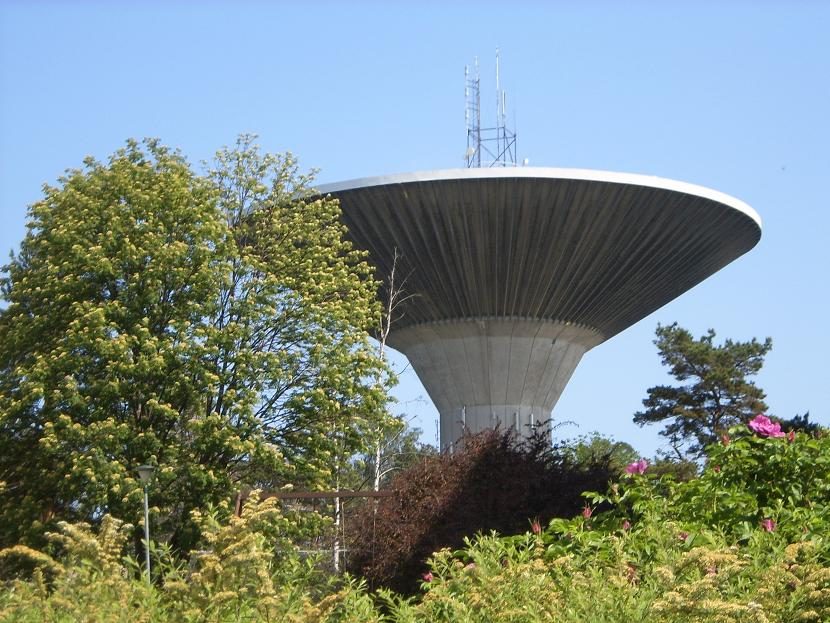
The Lauttasaari water tower was a visible landmark.

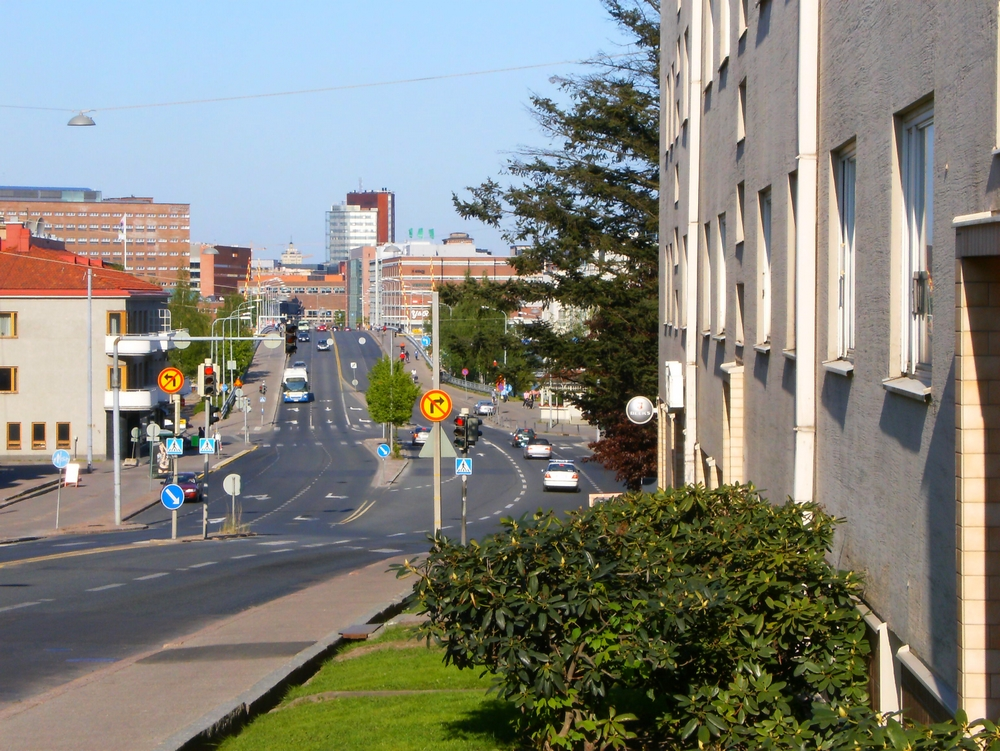
The Lauttasaari bridge.

=== Connection to the mainland ===
There are two bridges connecting Lauttasaari to mainland Helsinki. The Lauttasaari bridge leads from Ruoholahti to Lauttasaarentie, and the Lapinlahti bridge is part of the Länsiväylä highway leading west from Helsinki, located to the north of the Lauttasaari bridge and built in the 1960s. Upon completion the Lapinlahti bridge was the longest bridge in Helsinki at the time. Before the Länsiväylä highway was built the street Lauttasaarentie was part of the main road leading west from Helsinki. The street Jorvaksentie, the predecessor of Länsiväylä, started from its western end.

In the 1950s the original Lauttasaari bridge from 1935 was seen as far too narrow, and it was dismantled in 1967, two years after the highway bridge to the north of it had been completed. The current four-lane Lauttasaari bridge was built in place of the dismantled bridge.

=== Public transport ===
==== Metro ====
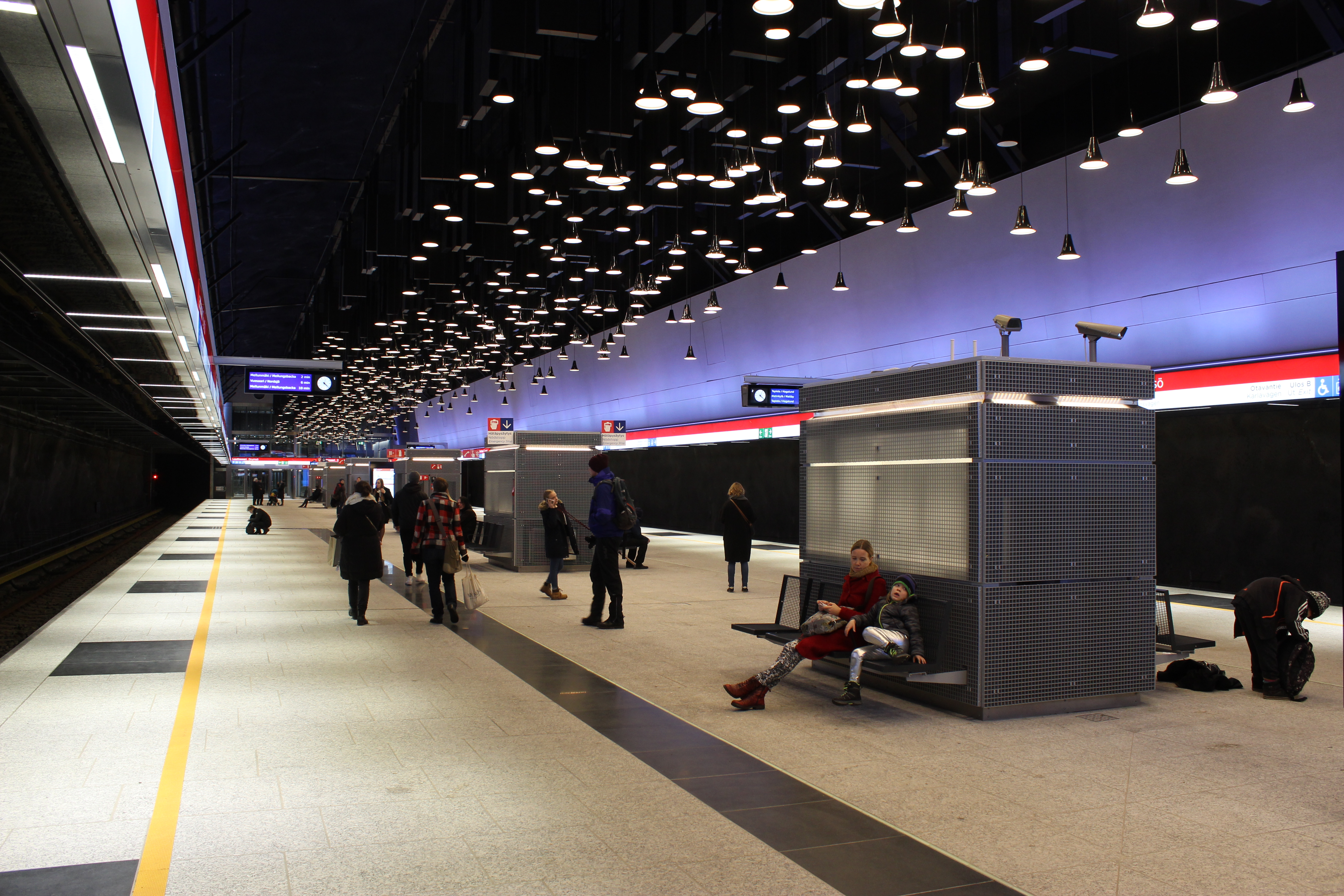
Lauttasaari metro station

The Helsinki metro has two stations in the district, the Lauttasaari and the Koivusaari stations. The Lauttasaari metro station is served by two entrances: one in the Lauttis shopping centre, and one on Gyldenintie.

==== Bus ====
All the internal bus routes – 20, 21, and 21B – connect with at least one of the metro stations, and the routes 20 and 21 continue to the city centre. The bus routes 115A and 555 start at the centre of the island. Route 115A runs via Tapiola to Mankkaa in Espoo, and route 555 runs via Espoo to Martinlaakso in the city of Vantaa. Lauttasaari is also served by night bus routes 20N and 112N from the city centre.

=== Car ===
The Länsiväylä (also the National road 51) motorway that links central Helsinki with Espoo passes through Lauttasaari, and has two interchanges on the island. Espoo's side starts in the Westend district. Going towards the city center of Helsinki, the Länsiväylä will run along the Lauttasaari Bridge, which was built in late December 1969. The bridge is 317 metres long and 23.5 metres wide, made of reinforced concrete, and its span is 56.6 metres.

== Organisational activity ==
Lauttasaari is an organisationally active district. This is evident from the influential, politically independent local Lauttasaari Society.

A local voluntary fire brigade was founded in 1916 by the initiative of postman Emil Wathén with financial support from Julius Tallberg, for which Tallberg donated the building lot and building supplies for its own fire brigade house. This classic wooden fire brigade house with a hose tower was in service until 1965 when it was dismantled and was replaced with the current fire brigade house built from stone.

A noteworthy aspect of the fire brigade's history is that the artist Ola Fogelberg, nicknamed "Fogeli", living in Lauttasaari served as its chief for several years. His portrait still remains on the wall of the fire brigade house along with the portraits of other chiefs and honorary members. His term as chief ended at the start of the Winter War.

=== The hunt of "Nastamuumio" ===
For a couple of decades, an unknown person has been causing trouble for cyclists on Lauttasaari by sprinkling thumb tacks on the street, whom the media calls the "Nastamuumio" (lit. 'Tack Mummy', a pun on "Mustanaamio" (lit. 'Black Mask'), the Finnish name for the comics character The Phantom). Attempts have been made to solve the case, even using a private investigator, but with poor results. Information from the public is still being sought to track down the "Nastamuumio".

== Future ==
The population of Lauttasaari at the end of the 2020s was estimated to be 24,797 inhabitants.

The amount of traffic in Lauttasaari is going to increase, as the number of visitors to the Lauttasaari metro station and the Koivusaari metro station are projected to reach 30 thousand people per day in total.

== Lauttasaarentie and Lauttis ==
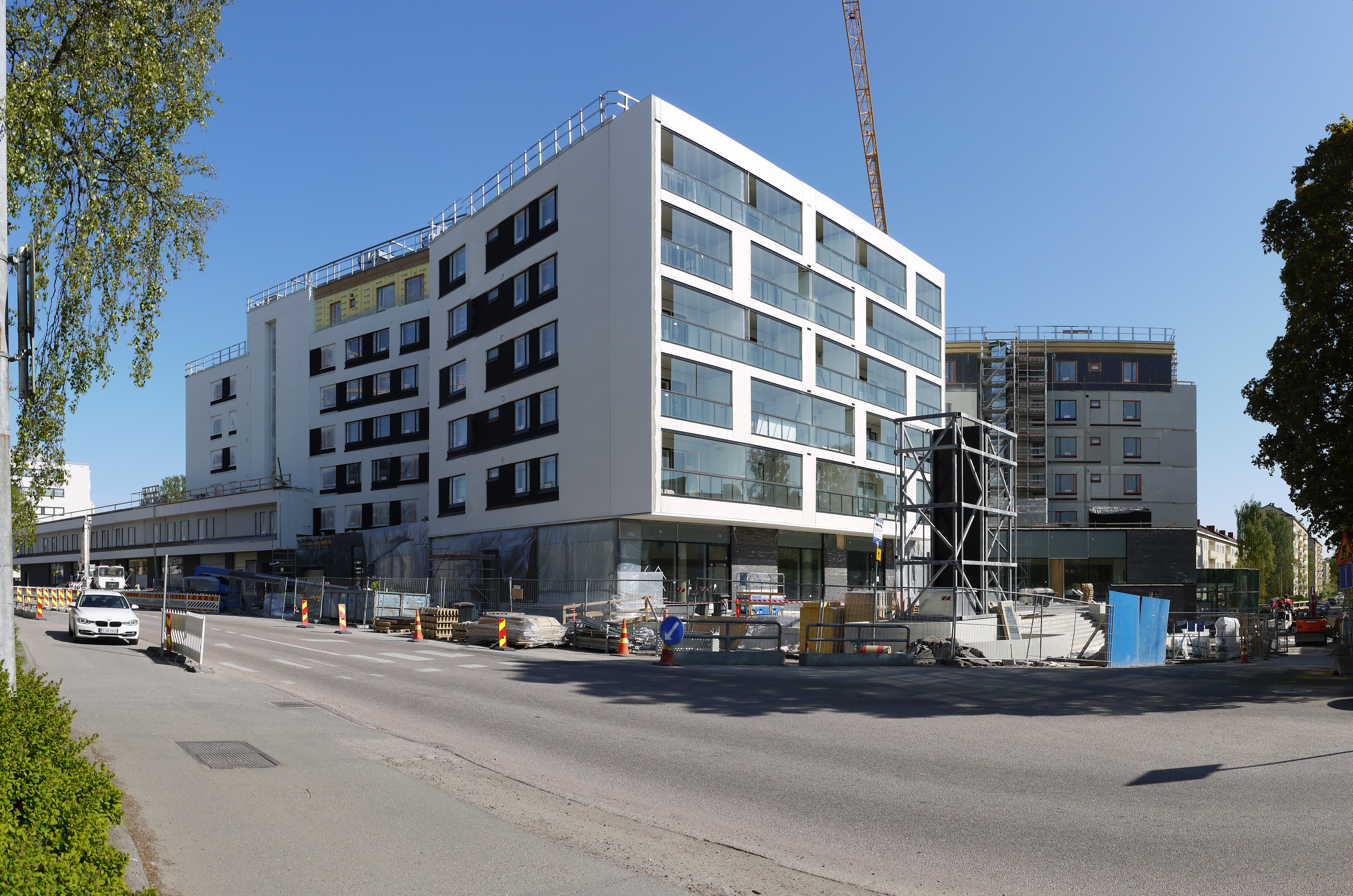
New apartment buildings and the shopping centre Lauttis in 2016.

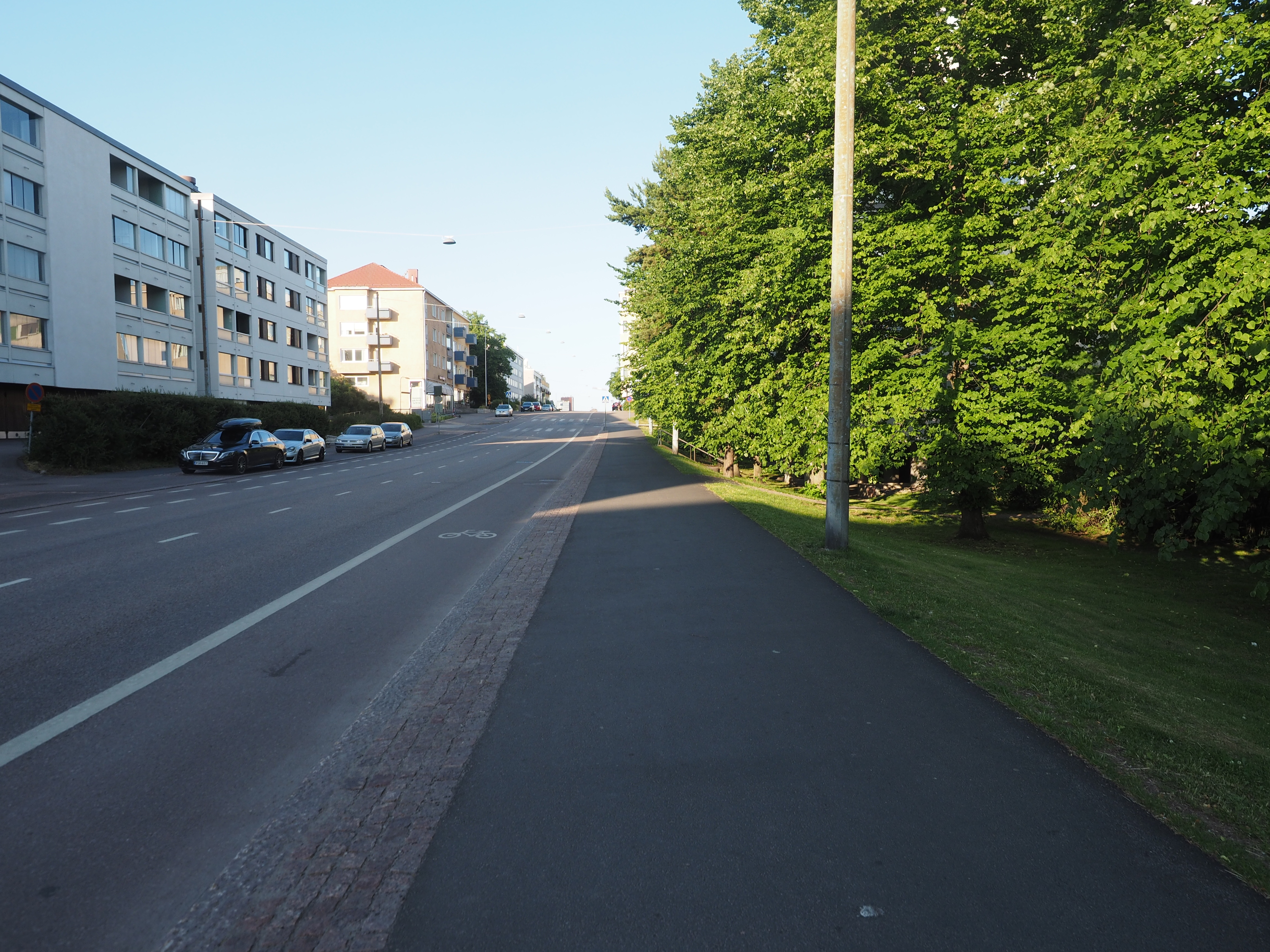
Lauttasaarentie

Lauttasaarentie is the main thoroughfare in Lauttasaari, home to many residents, and the location of the shopping mall Lauttis, which also serves as one of the entrances to the Lauttasaari metro station. The shopping mall is the commercial centre of the island, and near its geographical centre.

== Subdistricts ==
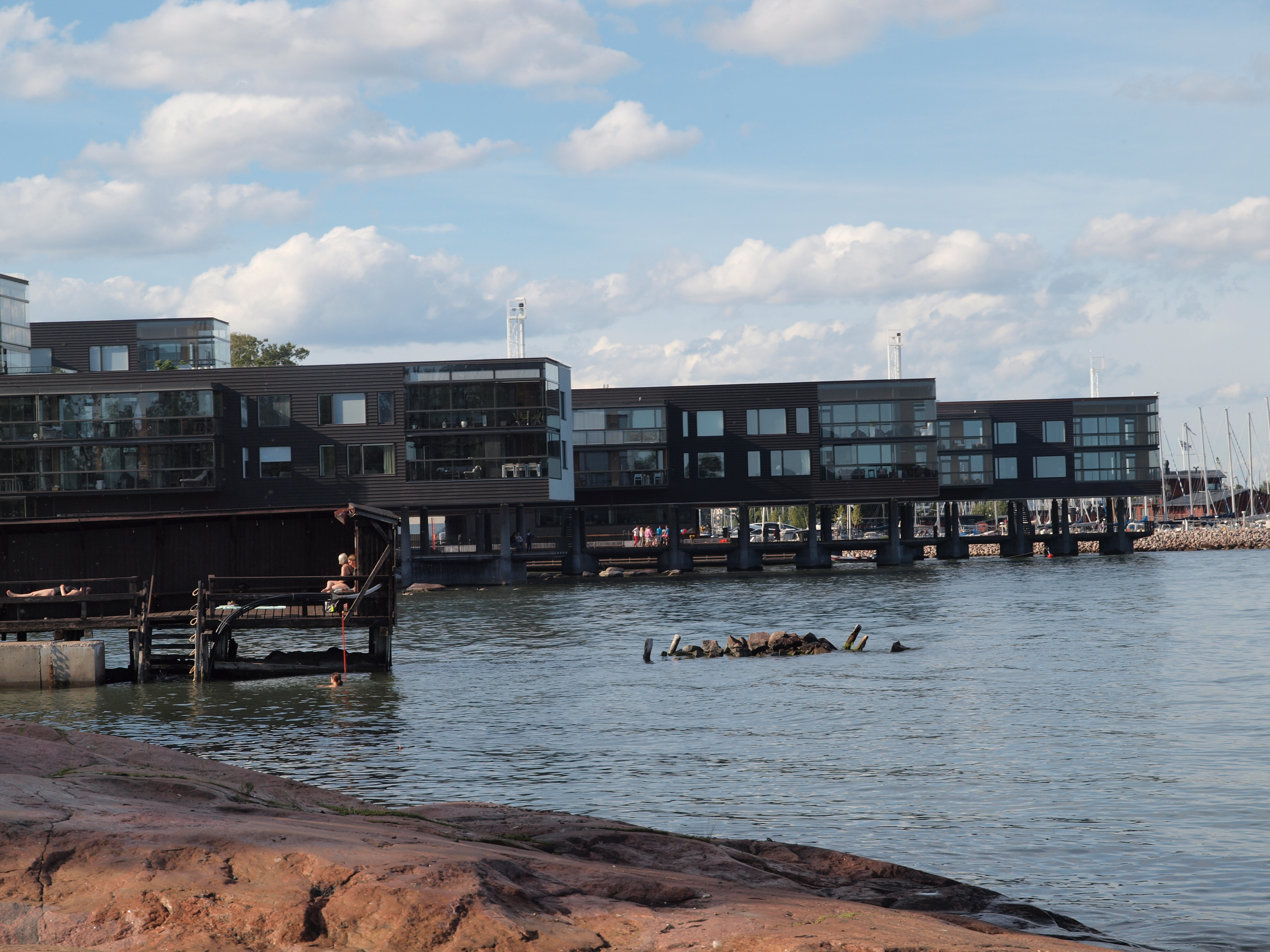
Apartment houses built partially above the sea on the southern shore of Lauttasaari.

The district of Lauttasaari is divided into four subdistricts.

=== Koivusaari ===
The subdistrict of Koivusaari is a separate island, separated from Lauttasaari by a narrow channel. It had no residents as of 2017. Its postal code is 00200. The Koivusaari metro station was built in anticipation of extending the island by land fill and constructing residential buildings on it.

=== Kotkavuori ===
The subdistrict of Kotkavuori comprises the northeastern part of the island, nearest Helsinki city centre. The housing is mainly apartment buildings. The subdistrict has one of the two main hills of the island, where the iconic Lauttasaari water tower was located in 1958–2015.

Kotkavuori had 8,117 residents as of 2017. Its postal code is 00200.

=== Myllykallio ===
The subdistrict of Myllykallio comprises the western part of the island. The housing is mainly apartment buildings. The subdistrict has one of the two main hills of the island.

The area of Katajaharju is the part of Myllykallio on the north side of Länsiväylä motorway. The housing is mainly private residential houses.

Myllykallio had 7,066 residents as of 2017. Its postal code is 00200.

=== Vattuniemi ===
The subdistrict of Vattuniemi comprises the southern part of the island. The area was built up in the 1950s as an industrial zone. Since 2000, there has been a significant change in the makeup of the area, and several office and industrial facilities have been demolished, with apartments being built to replace them. Currently, the median price of residential property is relatively high, causing the residential makeup to consist of the young and affluent. The main streets are Särkiniementie on the western side of the area, and Vattuniemenkatu on the eastern side.

Vattuniemi had 8,043 residents as of 2017. Its postal code is 00210.

== Notable residents ==
- Zahra Abdulla (1966–), politician
- Ilkka Kuusisto (1933–2025), composer and manager of the Finnish National Opera
- Johanna Nordblad (1975–), designer, ice diver, and freediver
- Spede Pasanen (1930–2001), comedian, director, and inventor
- Sirpa Asko-Seljavaara (1939–), politician

== See also ==
- Ruoholahti
