= Liberalism in Europe =

Liberalism in Europe is a political movement that supports a broad tradition of individual liberties and constitutionally-limited and democratically accountable government. These European derivatives of classical liberalism are found in centrist movements and parties, as well as some parties on the centre-left and the centre-right.

Most liberalism in Europe is conservative or classical whilst European social liberalism and progressivism is rooted in classical radicalism, a left-wing classical liberal idea. Liberalism in Europe is broadly divided into two groups: "social" (or "left-") and "conservative" (or "right-"). This differs from the USA's method of dividing liberalism into "modern" (simply liberal) and "classical" (or libertarian, albeit there is some disagreement), although the two groups are very similar to their European counterparts.

== Liberal practices ==
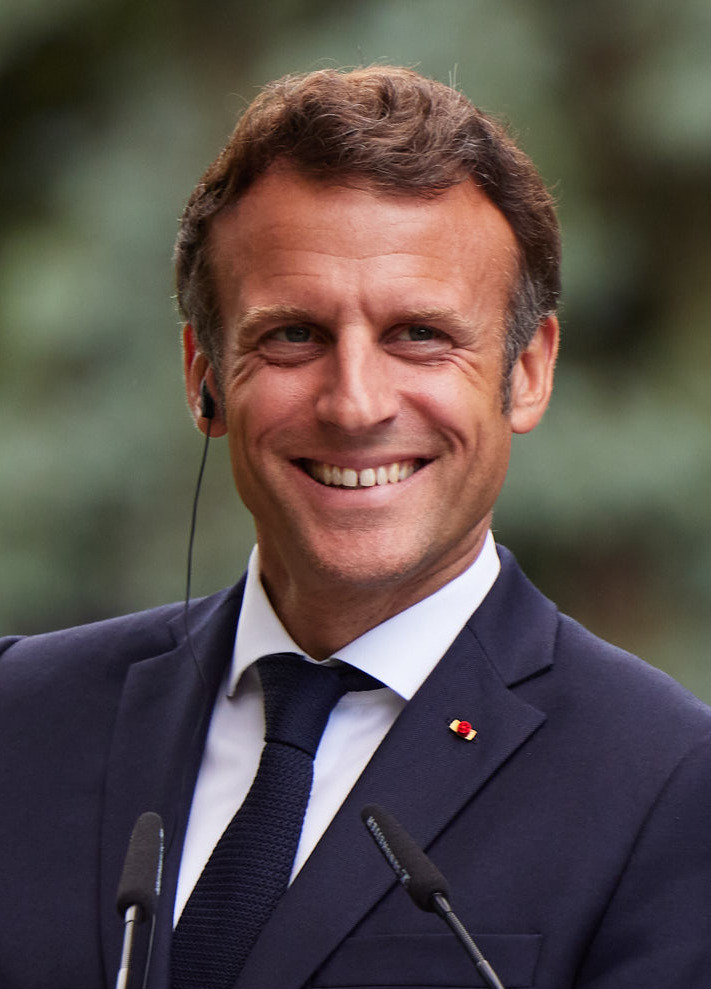
Emmanuel Macron, President of France since 2017, is often described as the strongest advocate for liberalism in Europe.

Liberal political parties have specific policies, which the social scientist can either read from party manifestos, or infer from actual actions and laws passed by ostensibly liberal parties. The sources listed below serve to illustrate some of the current liberal attitudes in Europe:

- the policies of liberal parties in government, including those in coalition arrangements (taking into mind that coalition partners make compromises), since they show what liberals are prepared to accept, as well as the policies of liberal parties in opposition;
- the positions of the Alliance of Liberals and Democrats for Europe faction in the European Parliament, as well as the Electoral Manifestos of the European Liberal Democrat and Reform Party;
- the forum of Germany's Free Democratic Party, which is relatively unmoderated, and illustrates grassroots liberal concerns. Sites of other Liberal parties, such as Britain's Liberal Democrats, or the Netherlands' Democrats 66, are more heavily moderated and therefore more representative for the policy of liberal parties;
- the Belgian website/think tank Liberales.be, which has longer essays on new liberal policies;
- the views and policies of the Open Society Institute, since they explicitly claim to derive from the principles of the major liberal philosopher Karl Popper;
- the Lisbon Strategy of the European Union, since it is strongly supported by the liberal parties, and sets out a vision of a future Europe.

Additionally, liberal value preferences can be inferred from the liberalisation programmes and policies of the International Monetary Fund and the World Bank. The liberalism visible in these sources emphasizes in comparison with other ideologies more belief in individual development as a motor for society and the state providing a social safety net. The liberal policies differ from country to country and from party to party.

== Ideology ==
European liberalism is largely divided into classical (in practical terms, liberalism as it is applied to the economy), social, and conservative. Liberalism in the European context is distinct from liberalism in the United States. In the United States, people who are called liberals generally advocate for a larger government, some forms of protectionism, and more economic interventionism, and are sometimes also called social democrats, or even leftists. In contrast, European liberals usually favor limited government, free trade, and adhere to economic liberalism.

In the context of European politics, a liberal (when the word is used without a modifier) is generally understood to refer to a classical liberal, who may be either centre-left or centre-right. As a result, a European classical liberal usually refers to a centre-right person with prominent economically liberal tendencies; Germany's Free Democratic Party, for example, follows classical liberalism in this sense. Under one interpretation, a European mainstream conservative liberal (a proponent of ordoliberalism or Christian democracy) usually has weaker economically liberal tendencies than a social liberal; however, some consider classical liberals (economic liberals) to also be conservative liberals.

=== European Union ===
European liberalists tend to support the European Union. One example is Emmanuel Macron, the incumbent president of France, who campaigned against Marine Le Pen, a candidate from the far-right, nationalist, and Eurosceptic party known as the National Rally. Some prominent European liberalists, such as Guy Verhofstadt (former Prime Minister of Belgium), Viviane Reading (current Vice-President of the European Commission), and Matteo Renzi (former Prime Minister of Italy), are proponents of a future federalisation of the European Union.

=== Social issues ===
Among European liberals, classical liberals and social liberals support cultural liberalism, for example LGBT rights issues including same-sex marriage, legalization of some drugs, opening immigration, etc., while most conservative liberals, including ordoliberals, Christian democrats, and some agrarians, take a moderate-to-conservative stance on cultural issues. For example, Finland's Centre Party, a Nordic agrarian party, follows conservative liberalism in this sense.

== Parties ==
=== Government ===
| Country | Symbol | Parties | Head of state Head of government | Upper/ Lower house | Founded | Leader/Founder | Former party | European/ International affliction | Ideology/ Political position |
|---|---|---|---|---|---|---|---|---|---|
| Belgium | | Open Flemish Liberals and Democrats Flemish Open Vlaamse Liberalen en Democraten | Prime Minister Alexander De Croo | Chamber of Representatives (Lower House) 12 / 87 Senate (Upper House) 5 / 60 Coalition: Open Vld; MR; sp.a; PS; CD&V; Ecolo; Groen | 1992 (VLD) 2007 (Open VLD) | Leader Egbert Lachaert | Preceded by Party for Freedom and Progress | European Renew Europe Alliance of Liberals and Democrats for Europe (ALDE) International Liberal International (LI) | Ideology Liberalism (Belgium) Conservative liberalism Pro-Europeanism Political position Centre-right |
| Belgium | | Reformist Movement French Mouvement Réformateur | N/A | Chamber of Representatives (Lower House) 14 / 87 Senate (Upper House) 8 / 60 Coalition: Open Vld; MR; sp.a; PS; CD&V; Ecolo; Groen | 21 March 2002 | Leader Georges-Louis Bouchez | Preceded by Liberal Reformist Party Citizens' Movement for Change | European Renew Europe Alliance of Liberals and Democrats for Europe (ALDE) International Liberal International (LI) | Ideology Liberalism (Belgium) Pro-Europeanism Political position Centre-right |
| Croatia | | Croatian People's Party – Liberal Democrats (HNS – LD) Croatian Hrvatska narodna stranka – Liberalni demokrati (HNS – LD) | N/A | Sabor 1 / 151 Coalition Croatian Democratic Union Independent Democratic Serb Party with support from HSLS, HDS, HDSSB, HNS, Reformists, Democratic Union of Hungarians, Kali Sara, Union of Albanians and Independents | 13 October 1990 | Leader Predrag Štromar Founder Savka Dabčević-Kučar | Preceded by Coalition of People's Accord | Regional Liberal South East European Network European Renew Europe Alliance of Liberals and Democrats for Europe (ALDE) | Ideology Social liberalism Pro-Europeanism Political position Centre to centre-left |
| Finland | | Centre Party Finnish Suomen Keskusta, Kesk Swedish Centern i Finland | Deputy Prime Minister Annika Saarikko | Parliament 31 / 200 European Parliament 2 / 14 Coalition Social Democratic Party Centre Party Green League Left Alliance Swedish People's Party | 1906 | Leader Annika Saarikko | Preceded by Annika Saarikko | European Renew Europe International Liberal International (LI) | Ideology Agrarianism Economic interventionism Conservative liberalism Political position Centre |
| Finland | | Swedish People's Party of Finland Swedish Svenska folkpartiet i Finland Finnish Suomen ruotsalainen kansanpuolue | N/A | Parliament 10 / 200 European Parliament 1 / 14 Coalition Social Democratic Party Centre Party Green League Left Alliance Swedish People's Party | 1906 | Leader Anna-Maja Henriksson Founder Axel Lille Axel Olof Freudenthal | Preceded by Svecoman movement | European Renew Europe Alliance of Liberals and Democrats for Europe (ALDE) International Liberal International (LI) | Ideology Swedish-speaking minority interests Liberalism (Finland) Pro-Europeanism Political position Centre |
| France | | La République En Marche! | President Emmanuel Macron Prime Minister Jean Castex | National Assembly (Lower House) 280 / 577 Senate (Upper House) 23 / 348 European Parliament 11 / 79 Coalition LREM MoDem MR Agir TDP | 6 April 2016 | Leader Stanislas Guerini Founder Emmanuel Macron | | European Renew Europe | Ideology Liberalism (France) Classical liberalism Pro-Europeanism Political position Centre |
| France | | Agir | Minister of Europe and Foreign Affairs Franck Riester | National Assembly (Lower House) 11 / 577 Senate (Upper House) 6 / 348 European Parliament 1 / 79 Coalition LREM MoDem MR Agir TDP | 6 April 2016 | Leader Franck Riester | | European Renew Europe | Ideology Conservative liberalism Christian democracy Pro-Europeanism Political position Centre-right |
| Germany | | Free Democratic Party | Secretary of the Treasury Christian Lindner | Bundestag 92 / 736 State Parliaments 134 / 1,884 European Parliament 5 / 95 Coalition SPD Grüne FPD | 6 April 2016 | Chairman Christian Lindner General Secretary Volker Wissing | | European Renew Europe | Ideology Liberalism (Germany) Classical liberalism Conservative liberalism Pro-Europeanism Political position Centre to centre-right |
| Italy | | Go Italy Italian; Forza Italia | N/A | Chamber of Deputies (Lower House) 79 / 630 Senate of the Republic (Upper House) 50 / 315 European Parliament 9 / 76 | 16 November 2013 | Leader Silvio Berlusconi Founder Silvio Berlusconi | | European European People's Party (EPP) | Ideology Liberalism (Italy) Liberal conservatism Conservative liberalism Berlusconism Political position Centre-right |
| Portugal | | Liberal Initiative Portuguese; Iniciativa Liberal | N/A | Parliament 8 / 230 | 13 December 2017 | Leader João Cotrim de Figueiredo Founder Alexandre Krauss; Bruno Horta Soares; Rodrigo Dias Saraiva (and others) | | European Alliance of Liberals and Democrats for Europe Party (ALDE) | Ideology Liberalism (Portugal) Classical liberalism Right-libertarianism Pro-Europeanism Political position Centre-right |

== See also ==
- Liberalism by country for discussion of individual states of Europe
- Classical liberalism (mainly economic liberalism)
- Conservative liberalism (right-liberalism)
  - Liberal conservatism
- Social liberalism (left-liberalism)
  - Liberal socialism
- Libertarianism
- Ordoliberalism
- Radicalism (historical)
