= Swedish Party =

Swedish Party Svenska partiet
- Founded: 1880s
- Dissolved: 1906
- Succeeded by: Swedish People's Party of Finland
- Newspaper: Nya Pressen
- Ideology: Svecomania; Constitutionalism; Conservatism

The Swedish Party (Swedish: Svenska partiet; Finnish: Ruotsalainen puolue) was a political grouping in the Grand Duchy of Finland, the autonomous province of the Russian Empire that later became independent Finland. It took shape during the 1880s to defend the position of the Swedish language against the Fennoman movement, and was the predecessor of the Swedish People's Party, founded in 1906.

Finland had been part of Sweden until 1809, and Swedish remained the language of government, the courts and higher education even though Swedish speakers were a minority: in 1880 they numbered 294,000, or 14.3 per cent of the population. The party operated in the Diet of Finland, where the four estates – nobility, clergy, burghers and peasants – met and voted separately. The Swedish Party had the upper hand among the nobility and the burghers, while the Finnish Party dominated the clergy and the peasantry.

The party was never founded at any meeting and long had no programme, chairman, field organisation or party discipline; it was a tendency held together by a common stand on the language question. Its organ was the newspaper Nya Pressen, started in 1882. The Parliament Act of 1906 abolished representation by estate and replaced the Diet with a unicameral parliament elected by universal suffrage. Because the party's whole position rested on the estates, it reorganised the same year as the Swedish People's Party.

== Background ==
=== The language question in the Diet ===
Members of the burgher estate at the Diet of 1863–64. The burghers were one of the two estates the party came to control.

The Diet of Finland was summoned in 1863 for the first time in 54 years, since the Diet of Porvoo of 1809. In the same year the Language Decree, issued by Emperor Alexander II without the Diet's involvement, promised that Finnish would be given equal standing with Swedish as a language of administration within twenty years, and language became the Diet's great point of contention. A Finnish party formed there, and the Swedish-minded answered with a political grouping of their own.

Neither grouping was a membership organisation in the modern sense; both were loosely held tendencies. A party could have supporters in several estates, and a single estate could contain more than one tendency. Because the estates voted separately, however, policy was decided by which party commanded a majority in which estate.

=== The "Vikings" ===
The philologist Axel Olof Freudenthal in 1877, photographed by Daniel Nyblin.

The party grew out of the Swedish nationalist movement, later known as svecomania, which from about 1860 gathered around the philologist Axel Olof Freudenthal and the newspapers Folkwännen and Wikingen – whence the group was called the "Viking party". Freudenthal's thesis was that language, not social class, determined nationality: Finland held two nationalities, one Finnish and one Swedish. The Swedish-speaking official elite took the opposite view, seeing a single Finnish nationality in which the upper class happened to speak Swedish and the common people Finnish. The Vikings were students who stood close to the Swedish-speaking rural population and had not been won over by the upper class's cultural Fennomania; for them it came more naturally to celebrate the language than the state. A similar generational shift was taking place among the Fennomans, whose first generation came from Swedish-speaking educated families and was succeeded by students from Finnish-speaking farming homes. The Vikings accordingly counted the Swedish-speaking peasantry as their own and devoted themselves to its dialects and to popular education.

The movement gained a foothold in the House of Nobility as well when V. M. von Born, R. A. Wrede and Kasten Antell began their work in the noble estate at the Diet of 1877–1878, pursuing a Swedish-minded policy with the newspaper Östra Nyland as their mouthpiece. The Swedish Party grew out of this Viking party. In 1882 its organ Nya Pressen was started, with Axel Lille as editor-in-chief; Lille went on to represent the party at every session of the Diet from 1885 to 1900.

== Political position ==
=== The liberals join ===
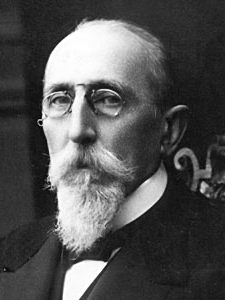
Leo Mechelin, who helped draft the liberals' programme of 1880.

During the 1880s the liberals around the newspaper Helsingfors Dagblad also made their way into the Swedish Party. Their programme of 1880, which Leo Mechelin helped to draft, regarded the people of Finland as a single whole and made bilingualism its ideal: Finnish and Swedish were to be used side by side, and anyone seeking public office ought to learn both. No separate liberal party ever established itself. After the attempt to consolidate as a linguistically neutral party failed in the early 1880s, most liberals in time went over to the Swedish Party. They came not for the sake of the language but to preserve Swedish culture in Finland and the country's ties westward. They gave the hitherto insignificant Viking party weight, authority and resources, but they also thinned out its national ideology and drew it further into the defence of Finland's constitution.

=== Suffrage in the burgher estate ===
The franchise in the burgher estate became the party's most sensitive question. So long as both the nobility and the burghers were Swedish-minded, the Diet was in balance, two estates against two. Were the franchise in the burgher estate extended to less prosperous townspeople, that estate would turn Finnish-minded and the Finnish-minded would command three estates against one, enough to carry their will in all essential matters. The Swedish Party therefore opposed the reform.

That opposition earned the party a reputation as a party of the upper class. After the February Manifesto of 1899 the language question receded before the struggle against Russification, in which the Swedish speakers stood in the front rank. Nya Pressen, which had pursued a consistent legalist line, was suppressed for good at the end of June 1900, and Axel Lille went into exile in Sweden in 1902.

== Party meeting of 1896 ==
Criticism of the party's want of a policy of its own was voiced as early as 1895, when Axel Lille called for a general party meeting on the grounds that the party had no positive programme and that its stance had been purely defensive. The meeting was held at the Helsinki fire brigade house on 10–11 January 1896 and drew 741 participants. It also became the first open conflict between the Swedish-speaking educated class and the rural population. It appointed a delegation to handle the franchise question, which became the party's first lasting organ.

== Reorganisation as the Swedish People's Party ==
Axel Lille photographed in 1906 by Herman Hamnqvist, the year he became the first chairman of the Swedish People's Party.

The general strike of 1905, part of the wider revolution in the empire, opened the way to a unicameral parliament elected by universal suffrage, and the party was poorly equipped for mass politics. At a party meeting in the Nyland Nation building in Helsinki on 20–21 May 1906 it reorganised itself as the Swedish People's Party, with Axel Lille as its first chairman. The new party addressed all Swedish speakers regardless of class or place of residence, rather than only the estate representatives in the Diet.

In the first election to the unicameral parliament in 1907 the Swedish People's Party won 24 of the 200 seats, behind the Social Democrats (80), the Old Finns of the Finnish Party (59) and the Young Finns (26).

== Sources ==
- Engman, Max (2016). Språkfrågan: finlandssvenskhetens uppkomst 1812–1922 (in Swedish). Helsinki / Stockholm: Society of Swedish Literature in Finland / Atlantis. ISBN 978-951-583-354-9.
- Hårdstedt, Martin (2024). Finlands svenska historia (in Swedish). Helsinki / Stockholm: Society of Swedish Literature in Finland / Natur & Kultur. ISBN 978-951-583-627-4.
- Klinge, Matti (1996). Finlands historia 3: Kejsartiden (in Swedish). Espoo: Schildts.
- Meinander, Henrik (2020). Finlands historia (in Swedish). Stockholm: Lind & Co. ISBN 978-91-7903-362-0.
