= Alexander Slotte =

Finland-Swedish writer (1861–1927)

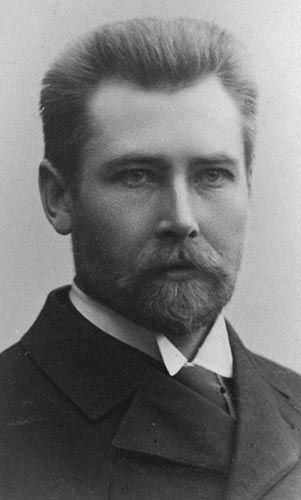
- Born: Mathias Alexander Slotte; 7 April 1861; Nedervetil, Grand Duchy of Finland
- Died: 3 April 1927 (aged 65); Helsinki, Finland
- Occupations: Schoolteacher; Playwright; Poet; Theatre critic
- Writing career
- Language: Swedish
- Notable works: Den stora islossningen (1910); Sånger och syner (1918)

Mathias Alexander Slotte (7 April 1861 – 3 April 1927) was a Finland-Swedish writer, playwright, poet and theatre critic. Working for nearly four decades as a primary-school teacher in Helsinki, he also became one of the central figures in early 20th-century Finland-Swedish theatre and a contributor to the literary criticism of Hufvudstadsbladet. He is best remembered for his poems set to folk melodies, several of which — among them Slumrande toner and Plocka vill jag skogsviol — became part of the established song repertoire of the Finland-Swedish community.

== Early life and education ==
Slotte was born in Nedervetil, a Swedish-speaking parish in Ostrobothnia, the son of farmer and parliamentary speaker Carl Johan Slotte. His older brother Karl Fredrik Slotte later became a noted physicist. At twelve he was sent to school in Gamlakarleby, graduating in 1878, and continued his studies in Åbo, where contact with classmates with literary interests turned his attention toward writing.

He passed his matriculation examination in 1882 and enrolled at the University of Helsinki, initially intending to study theology at his father's wish. After several years of attending lectures across a range of subjects — including Latin, philosophy and aesthetics — without producing examination results, he lost his father's financial support.

== Career ==
=== Teaching and editorial work ===
From 1888 Slotte was employed as a primary-school teacher by the city of Helsinki, a post he would hold for the rest of his working life, most of it at a school on Nikolaigatan (now Snellmansgatan). He also taught at the central school of the Art Society between 1890 and 1893. From 1906 he served as secretary of the General Crafts Society of Finland (Finlands allmänna slöjdförening), which worked to revive traditional Finnish handicraft through courses, competitions and reports; the present-day organisation Finska handarbetets vänner is a direct continuation of this work.

Alongside his teaching, Slotte was literary and theatre critic at the Swedish-language Helsinki daily Hufvudstadsbladet from 1890 to 1907.

=== Theatre ===
Slotte was drawn to the stage early in his career. After further studies in Germany and Denmark in 1886, he attended the drama school of the Swedish Theatre in Helsinki in 1886–1887. He made his acting debut in Edvard Brandes's En förlovning, which he had himself translated, and was favourably reviewed; he did not, however, establish a lasting career on stage.

He returned to a leading role in theatre at the turn of the century, when the Folkteatern (Swedish Folk Theatre) was founded in 1899 with the aim of bringing Finland-Swedish theatre to a broader audience. Between 1902 and 1904 Slotte served as its stage director and deputy head, and also taught at the institution's drama school. He was one of the principal advocates of a distinct Finland-Swedish theatre performed by domestic actors.

== Writing ==
=== Plays ===
Slotte made his literary debut with the play En svag stackare (1892). His historical and dramatic works include Halfdan skald (1896), set during the Viking age, and the marital drama Bengt Sved (1898). His best-known stage work is Den stora islossningen ("The Great Ice Break-Up"), which premiered at the Swedish Theatre in Helsinki on 15 November 1910. Set in his native region of Ostrobothnia in the early 20th century, the play addresses anxieties about the erosion of Swedish-speaking culture in the face of industrialisation, socialist movements and Finnish migration into formerly Swedish-speaking agrarian communities. Reviews praised the characterisation while criticising the political portrayal as schematic.

In 1908 Slotte won the dramatic competition of the cultural society Brage, writing under the pseudonym Sebastian Friis, with the folk play Nej ta hålen nan målar min stugå rö!, composed in the Gamlakarleby dialect.

=== Poetry and folk songs ===
Slotte joined the cultural society Brage in 1907 and remained an active member for two decades, serving on its board and from 1914 as director of its dramatic section. Through Brage he began a long collaboration with the society's chairman, the musicologist Otto Andersson, who set a large number of his poems to music. Together they shaped a body of song that became significant in the formation of Finland-Swedish cultural identity.

The 1913 booklet Toner från stugor och stigar, containing fifteen poems written to traditional folk melodies — nine by Slotte and the remainder by Ernst V. Knape and Jonatan Reuter — became influential in establishing a Finland-Swedish song repertoire. His collected poems appeared in 1918 as Sånger och syner. Among the songs that gained a lasting place in the Finland-Swedish community is "Slumrande toner", originally written as the rallying song of Brage and based on the principles set out in the society's statutes.

=== Prose ===
Slotte also wrote prose set in his native Ostrobothnia. The story collections Karlebybor och andra noveller (1912) and Solskensfolk och andra berättelser (1923) belong to the tradition of Finland-Swedish regional fiction and were published in several editions.

== Reception and legacy ==
Slotte was widely celebrated in his own time. In 1919 a tribute evening organised by Brage at the Swedish Theatre in Helsinki sold out despite raised ticket prices, and his songs continued to be performed, recorded and arranged throughout the 20th and into the early 21st century. Recordings of several of his poems are made available by the Swedish digital archive Litteraturbanken.

His personal archive is held by the Society of Swedish Literature in Finland.

== Selected works ==
Drama

- En svag stackare (1892)
- Halfdan skald (1896)
- Nej ta hålen nan målar min stugå rö! (1909), as Sebastian Friis
- Den stora islossningen (1912)
- Utvandrarne (1922)

Poetry

- Toner från stugor och stigar (1913), with Ernst V. Knape and Jonatan Reuter
- Bröllopssvit (1916)
- Sånger och syner (1918)

Prose

- Karlebybor och andra noveller (1912)
- Solskensfolk och andra berättelser (1923)
