= Håkan Andersson =

Håkan Andersson may refer to:

- Håkan Andersson (ice hockey) (born 1965), Director of European Scouting for the Detroit Red Wings professional ice hockey team
- Håkan Andersson (motorcyclist) (born 1945), Swedish former motocross World Champion
- Håkan Andersson (professor) (born 1940), Finland-Swedish professor of pedagogy
