= Ethnogenesis =

Development of ethnic identity

Ethnogenesis (from Ancient Greek ἔθνος (éthnos) 'group of people, nation' and γένεσις (génesis) 'beginning, coming into being'; pl. ethnogeneses) is the formation and development of an ethnic group. This can originate by group self-identification or by outside identification.

The term ethnogenesis was originally a mid-19th-century neologism that was later introduced into 20th-century academic anthropology. In that context, it refers to the observable phenomenon of the emergence of new social groups that are identified as having a cohesive identity, i.e., an "ethnic group" in anthropological terms. Relevant social sciences not only observe this phenomenon but also search for explanations for its causes. The term ethnogeny is also used as a variant of ethnogenesis.

== Passive or active ethnogenesis ==
Ethnogenesis can occur passively or actively.

A passive ethnogenesis is an unintended outcome, which involves the spontaneous emergence of various markers of group identity through processes such as the group's interaction with unique elements of their physical environment, cultural divisions (such as dialect and religious denomination), migrations and other processes. A founding myth of some kind may emerge as part of this process.

Active ethnogenesis is the deliberate, direct planning and engineering of a separate identity. However, it is clear that active ethnogenesis may augment passive ethnogenesis. Active ethnogenesis is usually inspired by emergent political issues, such as a perceived, long-term, structural economic imbalance between regions or a perceived discrimination against elements of local culture (e.g., as a result of the promotion of a single dialect as a standard language at the national level). With regard to the latter, since the late-18th century, such attempts have often been related to the promotion (or demotion) of a particular dialect; nascent nationalists, as well as proponents and opponents of a process of nation-building, have often attempted to establish a particular dialect (or group of dialects) as a separate language, encompassing a "national literature", out of which a founding myth may be extracted and promoted.

In the 19th and 20th centuries, societies challenged by the obsolescence of those narratives that previously afforded them coherence have fallen back on ethnic or racial narratives to maintain or reaffirm their collective identity or polis.

== Language revival ==
Language has been a critical asset for authenticating ethnic identities. The process of reviving an antique ethnic identity often poses an immediate language challenge, as obsolescent languages lack expressions for contemporary experiences.

In the 1990s, proponents of ethnic revivals in Europe included those from the Celtic fringes in Wales and nationalists in the Basque Country. Activists' attempts since the 1970s to revive the Occitan language in Southern France are a similar example.

Similarly, in the 19th century, the Fennoman movement in the Grand Duchy of Finland aimed to raise the Finnish language from peasant status to an official national language, which had been solely Swedish for some time. The Fennomans also founded the Finnish Party to pursue their nationalist aims. The publication in 1835 of the Finnish national epic, Kalevala, was a founding stone of Finnish nationalism and ethnogenesis. Finnish was recognized as an official language of Finland only in 1892. Fennomans were opposed by the Svecomans, headed by Axel Olof Freudenthal (1836–1911). He supported continuing the use of Swedish as the official language; it had been a minority language used by the educated elite in government and administration. In line with contemporary scientific racism theories, Freudenthal believed that Finland had two races, one speaking Swedish and the other Finnish. The Svecomans claimed that the Swedish Germanic race was superior to the majority Finnish people.

In the late 19th and early 20th century, Hebrew underwent a revival from a liturgical language to a vernacular language with native speakers. This process began first with Eliezer Ben-Yehuda and the creation of the Ben-Yehuda Dictionary and later facilitated by Jewish immigration to Ottoman Palestine during the waves of migration known as the First- and Second Aliyot. Modern Hebrew was made one of three official languages in Mandatory Palestine, and later one of two official languages in Israel (Arabic being the other). In addition to the modernization of the language, many Jewish immigrants changed their names to ones that originate from Hebrew or align with Hebrew phonology, a process known as Hebraization This indicates that Hebrew revival was both an ethnogenic and linguistic phenomenon.

In Ireland, the revival of the Irish language and the creation of Irish national literature was part of the reclamation of an Irish identity beginning at the end of the 19th century.

Since its independence from the Netherlands in 1830, language has been an important but divisive political force in Belgium between the Dutch and Germanic Flemings and Franco-Celtic Walloons. Switzerland has four national languages—German, French, Italian, and Romansh—each concentrated in four regions of the country. The Alemannic German-speaking (die Deutschschweizer) region is in the north and east, the French-speaking (Romandie) region in the west, the Italian/Lombard (la Svizzera italiana) region in the south, and the small Romansh-speaking population in the south-eastern corner of the country in the Canton of Graubünden.

== Specific cases ==
=== Ancient Greeks ===
Anthony D. Smith notes that, in general, there is a lack of evidence that hampers the assessment of the existence of nations or nationalisms in antiquity. The two cases where more evidence exists are those of ancient Greece and Israel. In Ancient Greece, cultural rather than political unity is observed. Yet, there were ethnic divisions within the wider Hellenic ethnic community, mainly between Ionians, Aeolians, Boeotians, and Dorians. These groups were further divided into city-states. Smith postulates that there is no more than a semblance of nationalism in ancient Greece. Jonathan M. Hall's work Ethnic Identity in Greek Antiquity (1997) was acclaimed as the first full-length modern study on Ancient Greek ethnicity. According to Hall, Ancient Greek ethnic identity was much based on kinship, descent and genealogy, which was reflected in elaborate genealogy myths. In his view, genealogy is the most fundamental way any population defines itself as an ethnic group. There was a change in the way Greeks constructed their ethnic identity in the Persian Wars period (first half of 5th century BC). Before that (archaic period), Greeks tended to connect themselves through genealogical assimilation. After the Persian invasion, they began defining themselves against the enemy they perceived as the barbarian “other”. An indication of this disposition is the Athenians' speech to their allies in 480 BC, mentioning that all Hellenes are bound with the homaimon ("same blood"), homoglosson ("same language"), and common religious practices. Hall believes that Hellenic identity was envisaged in the 6th century BC as being ethnic in character. Cultural forms of identification emerged in the 5th century, and there is evidence that by the 4th century, this identity was conceived more in cultural terms.

=== American ===
==== Americans in the United States ====
In the 2015 Community Survey of the United States Census, 7.2% of the population identified as having American ancestry, mainly people whose ancestors migrated from Europe after the 1400s to the southeastern United States. Larger percentages from similarly long-established families identified as German Americans, English Americans, or Irish Americans, leaving the distinction between "American" and specific European ethnicity largely as a matter of personal preference.

==== African Americans in the United States ====
The ethnogenesis of African Americans begins with slavery, specifically in the US. Between 1492 and 1880, 2 to 5.5 million Native Americans were enslaved in the Americas in addition to 12.5 million African slaves. The concept of race began to emerge during the mid-17th century as a justification for the enslavement of Africans in colonial America. Later, scientists developed theories to uphold the system of forced labor.

American society evolved into a two-caste system, with two broad classes: white and non-white, citizen and non-citizen (or semi-citizen). Non-white, non/semi-citizens were regarded as "Black" or "Negro" as a general term, regardless of their known ethnic/cultural background.

The lives and identities of African Americans have been shaped by systems of race and slavery, resulting in a unique culture and experience. Cultural aspects like music, food, literature, inventions, dances, and other concepts prominently stem from the combined experience of enslaved African American people and free African Americans who were still subject to racist laws in the United States.

Ethnicity is not solely based on race. However, due to the race-based history, system, and lifestyle of American society, African Americans tend to prefer to identify racially, rather than ethnically. This racialized identity has created the common misconception that African Americans are virtually a mono-racial African-descendant ethnic group in the United States. Still, the genetic architecture of African Americans is distinct from that of non-American Africans. This is consistent with the history of Africans, Europeans, and Native Americans intermixing during the transatlantic slave trade and race being a social construct created in the United States. Black American ethnicity stems from the unique ethnogenesis of their ancestors. This distinct cultural heritage, forged through generations of shared experience in the United States, differs from that of Black immigrants and their descendants, who, despite being racialized as Black in America, retain their own distinct cultural and ethnic identities. Though both might be racially categorized as "Black," an African immigrant and a Black American have distinct ethnic identities. The immigrant's roots are in their specific African nation, while Black Americans' ethnicity stems from the unique US experiences of slavery, Jim Crow, and the Civil Rights Movement, shaping a distinct culture with its own music, food, and traditions. This blurring of identities has led to misunderstandings and misrepresentations of Black Americans by those who, while also Black, do not share their specific ethnic background (Barack Obama, Kamala Harris, etc.)

Despite typically carrying segments of DNA shaped by contributions from peoples of Indigenous America, Europe, Africa, and the Americas, the genetics of African Americans can span across more than several continents. Within the African American population, there are no mono-ethnic backgrounds from outside of the U.S., and mono-racial backgrounds are in the minority.

=== Goths ===
Herwig Wolfram offers "a radically new explanation of the circumstances under which the Goths were settled in Gaul, Spain and Italy". Since "they dissolved at their downfall into a myth accessible to everyone" at the head of a long history of attempts to lay claim to a "Gothic" tradition, the ethnogenesis by which disparate bands came to self-identify as "Goths" is of wide interest and application. The problem is in extracting a historical ethnography from sources that are resolutely Latin and Roman-oriented.

=== Indigenous peoples of southwestern North America ===
Clayton Anderson observed that with the arrival of the Spanish in southwestern North America, the Native Americans of the Jumano cultural sphere underwent social changes partly as a reaction, which spurred their ethnogenesis. Ethnogenesis in the Texas Plains and along the coast occurred in two forms. One way involved a disadvantaged group being assimilated into a more dominant group that they identified with, while the other way involved the modification and reinvention of cultural institutions. Nancy Hickerson argued that the disintegration of 17th-century Jumano, caused in part by the widespread deaths from introduced diseases, was followed by their reintegration as Kiowa. External stresses that produced ethnogenetic shifts preceded the arrival of the Spanish and their horse culture. Drought cycles had previously forced non-kin groups to either band together or disband and mobilize. Intertribal hostilities forced weaker groups to align with stronger ones.

=== Indigenous peoples of southeastern North America ===
From 1539 to 1543, a Spanish expedition led by Hernando de Soto departed Cuba for Florida and the American Southeast. Although asked to practice restraint, Soto led 600 men on a violent rampage through present-day Florida, Georgia, South Carolina, North Carolina, Tennessee, Alabama, Mississippi, Arkansas, and East Texas. Frustrated with not finding gold or silver in the areas suspected to contain such valuable materials, they destroyed villages and decimated native populations. Despite his death in 1542, Soto's men continued their expedition until 1543 when about half of their original force reached Mexico. Their actions introduced European diseases that further weakened native populations. The population collapse forced natives to relocate from their cities into the countryside, where smaller villages and new political structures developed, replacing the older chiefdom models of tribal governance. By 1700, the major tribal settlements Soto and his men had encountered were no more. Smaller tribes began to form loose confederations of smaller, more autonomous villages. From that blending of many tribes, ethnogenesis led to the emergence of new ethnic groups and identities for the consolidated natives who had managed to survive the incursion of European people, animals, and diseases. After 1700, most North American Indian "tribes" were relatively new composite groups formed by these remnant peoples who were trying to cope with epidemic illnesses brought by and clashes with the Europeans who were exploring the area.

=== Indigenous peoples on the Canadian prairies ===
European encroachment caused significant demographic shifts in the size and geographic distribution of the indigenous communities, leading to a rise in mortality rates due to conflict and disease. Some Aboriginal groups were destroyed, while new groups emerged from the cultural interface of pre-existing groups. One example of this ethnogenesis is the Métis people.

=== Italian ===
During the Middle Ages in Italy, the Italo-Dalmatian languages differentiated from Latin, leading to the distinction of Italians from neighboring ethnic groups within the former Roman Empire. Over time, ethnological and linguistic differences between regional groups also developed, from the Lombardians of the North to the Sicilians of the South. Mountainous terrain allowed the development of relatively isolated communities and numerous dialects and languages before Italian unification in the 19th century.

=== Jewish ===
In classical antiquity, Jewish, Greek, and Roman authors frequently referred to the Jewish people as an ethnos, one of the numerous ethne that lived in the Greco-Roman world. Van Maaren demonstrates why ancient Jews may be regarded as an ethnic group in current terms by using the six characteristics that co-ethnics share as established by Hutchinson and Smith:

- (1) the usage of several ethnonyms to refer to the Jewish ethnos, including "Jews", "Israel" and "Hebrews";
- (2) Jews believed they shared a common ancestor as descendants of patriarch Jacob/Israel, and the Hasmonean dynasty (which controlled Judea between 140 and 37 BCE) employed the perceived common descent from Abraham to broaden definitions of Jewishness in their era;
- (3) historical events and heroes narrated in the Hebrew Bible and later scriptures served as a fundamental collection of shared memories of the past, and their community reading at synagogues helped instill the collective Jewish identity;
- (4) a shared culture including the religion of Judaism, worship of the God of Israel, Sabbath observance, kashrut, and the symbolic significance of the Hebrew language, even for Jews who did not speak it at the time;
- (5) a connection to the Land of Israel, Judaea or Palaestina, as their homeland to both local Jews and those residing abroad;
- (6) a sense of solidarity between Jews, on the part of at least some sections of the ethnic group as shown, for example, during the Jewish-Roman wars.

=== Moldovan ===
The separate Moldovan ethnic identification was promoted under Soviet rule when the Soviet Union established an autonomous Moldavian Autonomous Soviet Socialist Republic in 1924. This republic was situated between the Dniester and Southern Bug rivers (Transnistria), distinct from the Ukrainian SSR. Scholar Charles King concluded that this action was partly support for Soviet propaganda and help for a potential communist revolution in Romania. Initially, people of Moldovan ethnicity supported territorial claims to the regions of Bessarabia and Northern Bukovina, which were part of Romania at the time. The claims were based on the fact that the territory of eastern Bessarabia with Chisinau had belonged to the Russian Empire between 1812 and 1918. After having been part of the Romanian Principality of Moldova for 500 years, Russia was awarded the East of Moldova as compensation for its losses during the Napoleonic Wars. This marked the beginning of the 100 years of Russian history in East Moldova. After the Soviet occupation of the two territories in 1940, potential reunification claims were offset by the Moldavian Soviet Socialist Republic. When the Moldavian ASSR was established, Chișinău was named its capital, a role it continued to play even after the formation of the Moldavian SSR in 1940.

The recognition of Moldovans as a separate ethnicity, distinct from Romanians, remains today a controversial subject. On one hand, the Moldovan Parliament adopted "The Concept on National Policy of the Republic of Moldova" in 2003. This document states that Moldovans and Romanians are two distinct peoples and speak two different languages. It also acknowledges that Romanians form an ethnic minority in Moldova, and it asserts that the Republic of Moldova is the legitimate successor to the Principality of Moldavia. On the other hand, Moldovans are only recognized as a distinct ethnic group by former Soviet states.

Moreover, in Romania, people from Wallachia and Transylvania call the Romanians inhabiting western Moldavia, now part of Romania, as Moldovans. People in Romanian Moldova call themselves Moldovans, as subethnic denomination, and Romanians, as ethnic denomination (like Kentish and English for English people living in Kent). Romanians from Romania call the Romanians of the Republic of Moldova Bessarabians, as identification inside the subethnic group, Moldovans as subethnic group and Romanians as ethnic group. The subethnic groups referred to here are historically connected to independent Principalities. The Principality of Moldavia/Moldova founded in 1349 had various extensions between 1349 and 1859 and comprised Bucovina and Bessarabia as regional subdivisions. That way, Romanians of southern Bukovina (today part of Romania and formerly part of the historical Moldova) are called Bukovinians, Moldovans and Romanians.

In the 2004 Moldovan Census, of the 3,383,332 people living in Moldova, 16.5% (558,508) chose Romanian as their mother tongue, and 60% chose Moldovan. While 40% of all urban Romanian/Moldovan speakers indicated Romanian as their mother tongue, in the countryside, barely one out of seven Romanian/Moldovan speakers indicated Romanian as their mother tongue.

=== Palestinian ===
Prior to the dissolution of the Ottoman Empire, the term "Palestinian" referred to any resident of the region of Palestine, regardless of their ethnic, cultural, linguistic, or religious affiliation. Similarly, during the League of Nations Mandate of Palestine, the term referred to a citizen as defined in the 1925 Citizenship Order. Starting in the late 19th century, Arabic-speaking people of Palestine began referring to themselves as "Arab" or by the endonym "Palestinian Arab" when referencing their specific subgroup.

Following the foundation of the State of Israel, the Jews of the former Mandatory Palestine and the Arabs who received Israeli citizenship developed a distinct national identity. Consequently, the meaning of the word shifted to a demonym referring to the Arabs who did not receive citizenship in Israel, Jordan (West Bank residents), or Egypt (Gaza residents).

=== Singaporean ===
In Singapore, most of its country's policies have been focused on the cohesion of its citizens into a united Singaporean national identity. Singapore's cultural norms, psyche, and traditions have led to the classification of "Singaporean" as a unique ethnocultural and socio-ethnic group that is distinct from its neighboring countries.

In 2013, Singapore's Prime Minister Lee Hsien Loong stated that "apart from numbers, that a strong Singapore core is also about the spirit of Singapore, who we are, what ideals we believe in and what ties bind us together as one people." According to a 2017 survey by the Institute of Policy Studies, 49% of Singaporeans identify with both Singaporeans and their ethnic identity equally, while 35% would exclusively identify as "Singaporeans."

== Historical scholarship ==
Within the historical profession, the term "ethnogenesis" has been borrowed as a neologism to explain the origins and evolution of so-called barbarian ethnic cultures, stripped of its metaphoric connotations drawn from biology, of "natural" birth and growth. That view is closely associated with the Austrian historian Herwig Wolfram and his followers, who argued that such ethnicity was not a matter of genuine genetic descent ("tribes").

Rather, using Reinhard Wenskus' term Traditionskerne ("nuclei of tradition"), ethnogenesis arose from small groups of aristocratic warriors carrying ethnic traditions from place to place and generation to generation. Followers would coalesce or disband around these nuclei of tradition; ethnicities were available to those who wanted to participate in them with no requirement of being born into a "tribe". Thus, questions of race and place of origin became secondary.

Proponents of ethnogenesis may claim it is the only alternative to the sort of ethnocentric and nationalist scholarship that is commonly seen in disputes over the origins of many ancient peoples such as the Franks, Goths, and Huns. It has also been used as an alternative to the Near East's "race history" that had supported Phoenicianism and claims to the antiquity of the Assyrian people, including their various names.

=== Frontiers and military service ===
Some historians have explored how the conscription and exploitation of frontier populations for military service during episodes of civil war has directly fueled processes of ethnogenesis. Using the Han dynasty and Late Roman Empire as case studies, one scholar found that, as emperors, usurpers, and aspirants to imperial power vied for dominance, they drew disproportionately on minority groups inhabiting the empires' inner and outer frontiers to supply troops and material needed for military superiority. These patterns of extraction and militarization not only deepened the marginalization of these communities but also accelerated the formation of distinct ethnic identities.

== See also ==
- Lev Gumilev (1912–1992), founder of the passionarity theory of ethnogenesis
- Historiography and nationalism
- Nation-building
- Y-DNA haplogroups by ethnic group
- The Decline of the West – Spengler's account (1918–1923) of the rise and fall of civilisations
