= Svecoman movement =

19th-century Swedish nationalist movement in Finland

The Svecoman movement or svecomania (Swedish: svekomani; an adherent was a svekoman, Swedish pronunciation: [sveːkʊˈmɑːn], Finland Swedish: [sveːkuˈmɑːn]) was a Suecophile or pro-Swedish nationalist movement in the 19th-century Grand Duchy of Finland. It took shape from about 1860 in opposition to the Fennoman movement, which held that Finnish should replace Swedish as the language of government, the courts, the schools and educated life. Against the Fennoman view that Finland was a single nation which happened to have a Swedish-speaking upper class, the Svecomans argued that the country contained two nationalities, one Finnish and one Swedish, and that the Swedish-speakers — some one seventh of the population, and by no means only the elite — were entitled to remain what they were.

The movement grew out of the student world of the Imperial Alexander University in Helsinki, around the philologist Axel Olof Freudenthal, and its supporters became known as "the Vikings" after one of their newspapers. Where earlier defenders of Swedish had spoken for a governing class, the Svecomans turned to the Swedish-speaking farmers and fishermen of the coast, whose dialects, place names and customs they set out to record and whose schooling they set out to fund. Out of these circles came the Swedish Party and its newspaper Nya Pressen (1882), the popular-education society Svenska folkskolans vänner (1882) and the Society of Swedish Literature in Finland (1885).

Russian officials treated Swedish-mindedness as disloyalty. In Russian usage svekoman came to denote a political rather than a linguistic position, and from the 1890s the word was common in the imperial press as a term of abuse. When the four estates were replaced in 1906 by a parliament elected by universal suffrage, the Swedish Party reorganised itself as the Swedish People's Party. The Svecoman claim that the Swedish-speaking farmers and the Swedish-speaking educated class formed one people is the movement's lasting legacy. Its more radical descendants — East Swedishness and the demand for Swedish territorial self-government — belong to the years around Finnish independence in 1917 and had faded again by the 1920s.

== Terminology ==
The names svecomania and fennomania were both built on the suffix -mania, and the word svekoman came into general use around 1900 as a name for supporters of the Swedish nationality movement. Historians have gone on using both terms, though not universally: Max Engman avoided them because he did not share "the idea that nationalism was a disease or a derangement", and wrote of political actors instead as "Swedish-minded" (Swedish svensksinnad, Finnish ruotsinmielinen), matched by "Finnish-minded" for the other camp.

== Background ==
Finland had belonged to Sweden from the Middle Ages until the Finnish War of 1808–1809, when it was ceded to Russia and became an autonomous grand duchy within the Russian Empire. In a manifesto of June 1808 the emperor had promised that the population would keep its Swedish laws, including representation by estates, and he confirmed that undertaking at the Diet of Porvoo in March 1809. Swedish law and Swedish administration therefore stayed in force, and Swedish remained the language of government, the courts and higher education, although more than 85 per cent of the population spoke only Finnish. Swedish kept that dominant position until the beginning of the 20th century, even though only one seventh of the population had it as a first language.

Swedish-speakers were a minority, and they fell into two very different groups: the small educated class that ran the country, and a much larger farming and fishing population along the southern and western coasts. In 1880 they numbered 294,000, or 14.3 per cent of the population, a share that had been roughly stable for decades. For most of the century the two groups had little to do with one another. The upper class understood itself as the leadership of a Finnish nation and was willing in principle to give up Swedish for a laborious assimilation into the Finnish-speaking majority — and expected the Swedish-speaking countryside to follow it there. In practice the change came late: Swedish remained the home and working language of the administrative and academic elite until the 1880s, and the language of most higher education until the 1870s.

The Fennoman programme received its sharpest formulation from the philosopher Johan Vilhelm Snellman, whose thesis was "one nation, one language". It was given official effect by the language rescript that Emperor Alexander II — who ruled the country as its grand duke — issued in 1863, which laid down that Finnish was to be made equal to Swedish as a language of administration within twenty years, a deadline that was later extended. In the same year the emperor summoned the Diet of Finland for the first time in fifty-four years. From then on the Diet met regularly, and until the reform of 1906 it remained the arena of Finnish politics: four separate estates of nobility, clergy, burghers and peasants, chosen on a franchise that reached only a propertied minority.

Because the struggle was above all about the educated class and its language, the decisive institution was the grammar school that led to the university. That was where the future elite was trained, and it was the only route by which a thorough change of language could be brought about. As the Swedish-minded paper Wikingen put it in 1874, whoever controlled the schools controlled the future.

Nor could Finland's Swedish-speakers look to Sweden for a way out. The Crimean War of 1853–1856, in which British and French squadrons attacked the Finnish coast and briefly occupied Åland, ended Finland's position as a Swedish irredenta: the Finns had shown themselves reasonably content under the emperor, and with the collapse of political Scandinavianism in 1864 the idea of a reunion with Sweden disappeared from the agenda of Swedish politics.

== Origins: Freudenthal and the Vikings ==
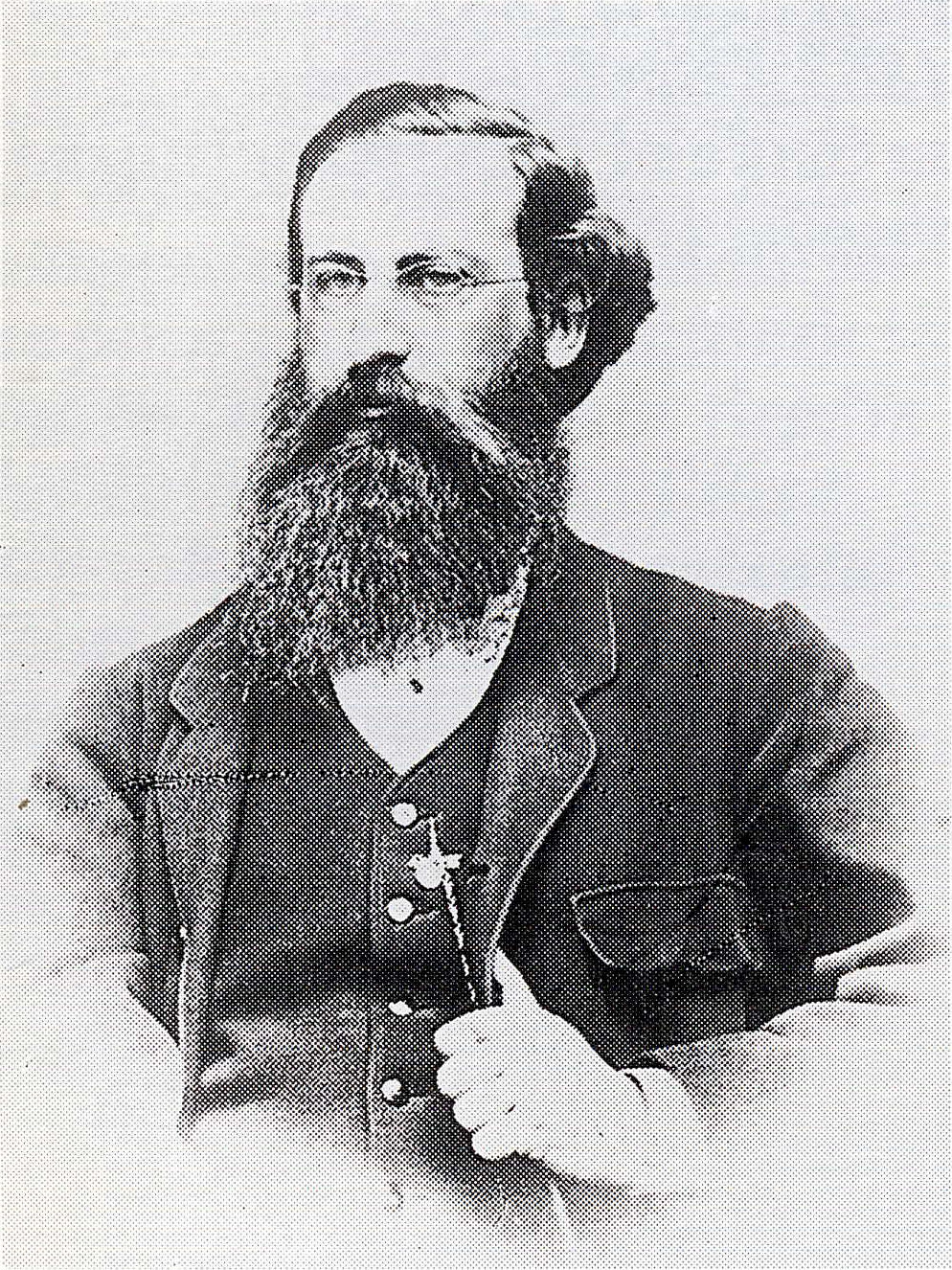
Axel Olof Freudenthal in the early 1870s. He was called the father of the Swedish nationality movement in Finland.

The beginning of Swedish nationalism in Finland is usually dated to debates in Nylands Nation — the student society for men from the province of Nyland — in 1859–1860, when Axel Olof Freudenthal (1836–1911) argued almost alone that educated young men should not help to Finnicise the Swedish-speaking population of their own province. The group that formed around him gathered around the newspapers Folkwännen — founded in 1861 and taken over by Freudenthal's supporters in 1869 — and Wikingen (1870–1874). The group was nicknamed "the Vikings" or "the Viking party". It drew on academic circles in Nyland with close ties to the landowning peasantry and to the burghers of the towns. Like the early Fennomans, the Vikings recruited chiefly among students, and they set themselves deliberately against the aristocratic outlook of the senior civil servants.

For Freudenthal and those who followed him, language was the primary test of nationality, and Finland therefore contained two nationalities, a Finnish and a Swedish one. The senior officials, by contrast, recognised only one Finnish nationality, whose upper class happened to speak Swedish. In keeping with the racial science of the period the two nationalities were also described as separate races, and the movement's scholarship emphasised what was archaic and Germanic, tying the Swedes of Finland to ancient western, Nordic and Swedish roots.

In the school question this produced a distinct position. Where the Fennomans wanted the language of a school to follow the language of its district — in practice a demand for Finnish — Wikingen insisted that it should follow the mother tongue of the pupils themselves, if necessary through parallel classes, and opposed bilingual schools altogether. The argument was framed as a right of the individual pupil, which was at the same time a shrewd defence of the small and exposed Swedish-speaking minorities of the interior.

Freudenthal was not the first to notice the Swedish-speaking countryside: Otto Höijer, Anders Svedberg and Fredrik Cygnaeus had all written in 1858–1860 about the educated class's neglect of it and contempt for it. What was new was the political conclusion drawn from it, since the rural population was now treated as the core of a nationality and tied directly to the Swedish-speaking elite. Students travelled into the Swedish-speaking districts of Nyland and Ostrobothnia to collect dialects, place names, songs and customs. Freudenthal founded a society for the study of Finland's Swedish dialects in 1874, wrote the first descriptions of the dialects of Närpes and Vörå, and from 1878 held the university's first chair of Swedish language and literature. The same taste for a Nordic past shaped the movement's self-image. On Freudenthal's proposal Nylands Nation began collecting money for a house of its own. It was inaugurated in 1883, built in a freely conceived Old Norse style and containing a "chieftain's hall". Finnish-minded critics called the project separatist and isolationist.

== Rural and cultural Swedishness ==
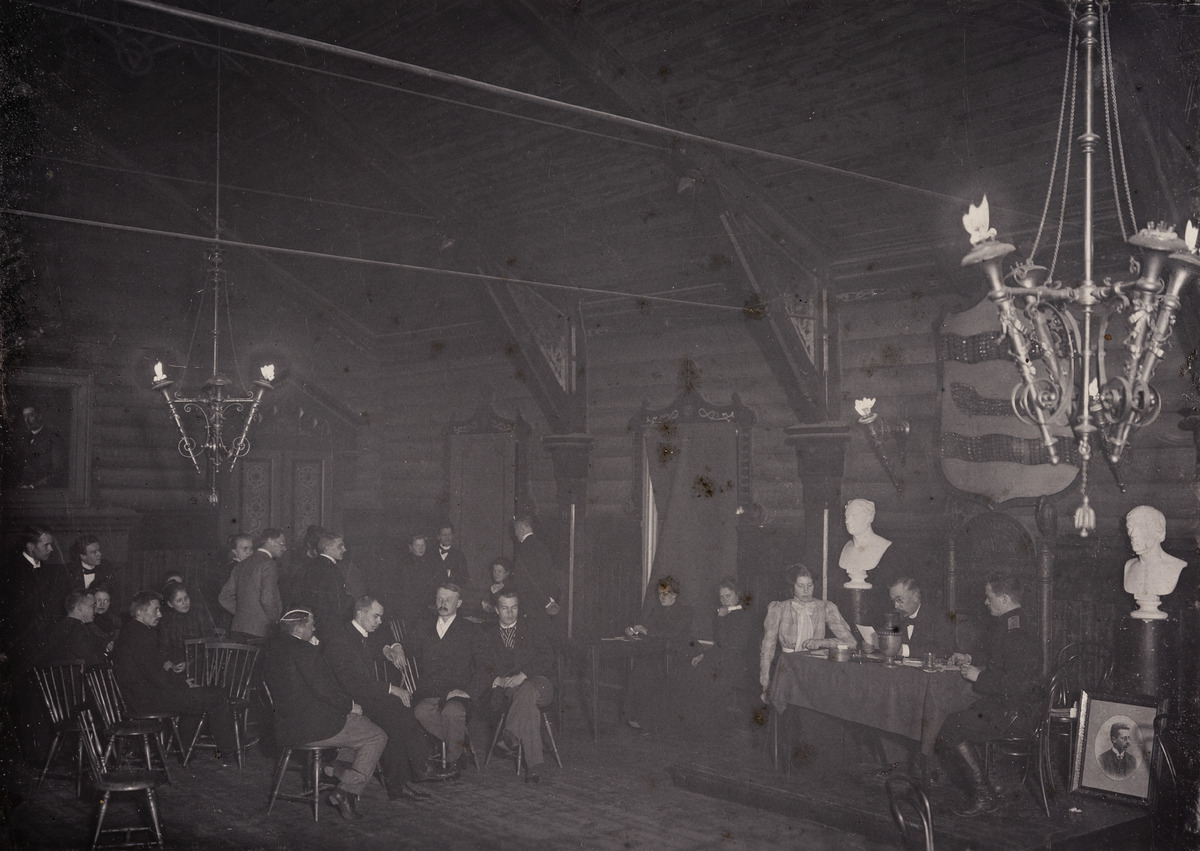
A meeting of Nylands Nation in the Old Norse "chieftain's hall" of its student house, probably 1899

Swedish-mindedness was never a single doctrine. Historians distinguish two strands. "Rural Swedishness" (bygdesvenskhet), associated with Freudenthal, emphasised a Finland-Swedish people rooted in the Swedish-speaking countryside. "Cultural Swedishness" (kultursvenskhet), associated with the professor of aesthetics Carl Gustaf Estlander, emphasised instead the Swedish inheritance in Finland's social institutions, culture and literature — a heritage shared across the language boundary, and in that view a reason for the whole country to keep Swedish rather than a reason to constitute a separate people.

== Organisations and the Swedish Party ==
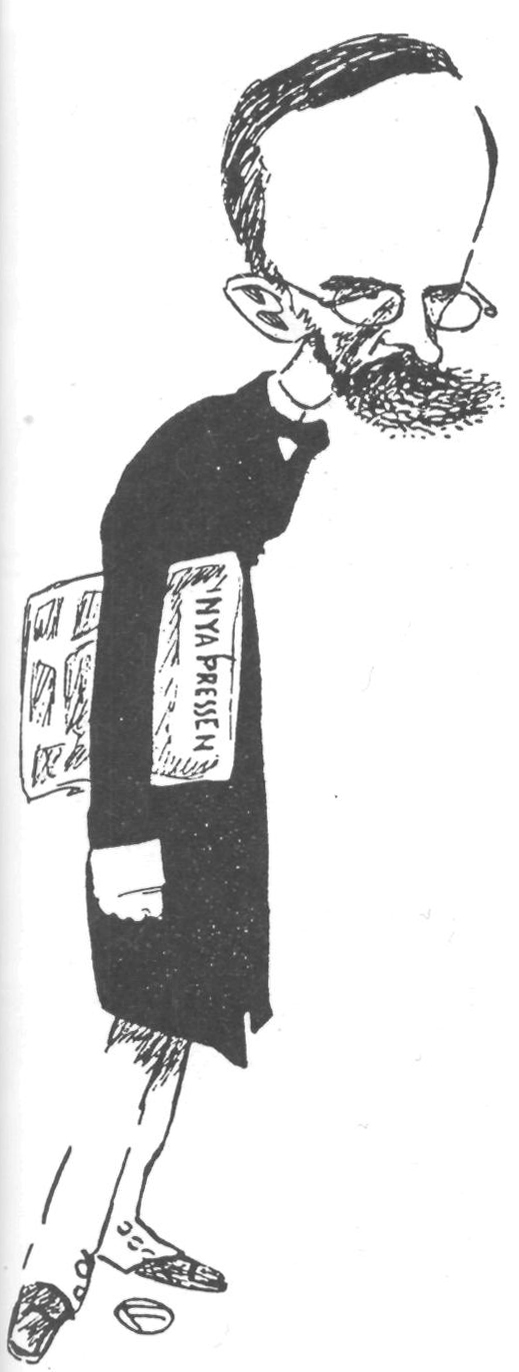
Axel Lille with his newspaper Nya Pressen, around 1900

Both strands took part in building the institutions of Swedish Finland. When Estlander set out to found a Swedish counterpart to the Finnish Literature Society of 1831 he went to Freudenthal and to the newspaperman Axel Lille, which has been read as a sign that he wanted the broadest possible base for the plan; the Society of Swedish Literature in Finland was founded on Runeberg Day, 5 February 1885. The Vikings' interest in popular education produced Svenska folkskolans vänner ("Friends of the Swedish Elementary School") in 1882, which funded Swedish-language schools and folk high schools, answering similar Fennoman efforts on the Finnish side.

The Swedish Party grew directly out of the Viking group, and in 1882 Axel Lille founded Nya Pressen as its organ. During the 1880s the party dominated the noble and burgher estates of the Diet, while the Finnish Party rested on the two socially more homogeneous estates of the clergy and the peasantry. Swedish-mindedness was not the only course open to the Swedish-speaking elite: through the 1860s and 1870s the liberals dominated it, and as late as 1880 Leo Mechelin dismissed Freudenthal's followers as "a small faction of Swedish zealots" and denied that the liberals had any special tie to the Swedish-speaking countryside. The liberal alternative nevertheless faded, and the Swedish Party was strengthened, and at the same time diluted, when many liberals joined it: they came not because they considered themselves members of a Swedish nationality, but because they wanted to preserve Finland's Swedish cultural form and its links westwards.

For a long time the party had no programme, no chairman, no field organisation and no party discipline, and the first general Swedish party meeting was held only in 1896. Its 741 participants came overwhelmingly from Helsinki and the rest of Nyland, and overwhelmingly from the educated class; only 69 were farmers or workers. The meeting nonetheless produced the first large political confrontation between the Swedish-speaking educated class and the countryside, whose speakers complained of advancing Finnicisation and of the gulf between the classes, and it prepared the ground for the change into a popular party in 1906.

== Russification ==
The Russian government had long looked more kindly on Finnish than on Swedish. It credited neither the Finnish language with much potential as a bearer of high culture nor the Finns with state-building capacity, and expected that once Swedish had been neutralised Finnish would settle into a modest place behind the empire's only remaining language of culture, Russian. From the 1860s Russian newspapers were already describing Finland's liberals as a "Swedish party" of Helsinki separatists.

The word acquired a fixed political meaning under Fyodor Heiden, governor-general from 1881, who used it in the memoranda setting out his programme. For Heiden a svekoman was not simply a Swedish-speaker but anyone hostile to the Finnish language, and therefore a political rather than a linguistic creature; from his writings the term passed into the Russian newspapers, where it became common in the 1890s. It was in the 1880s, too, that the government began to see "Svecoman" intrigues and plots everywhere and drew the short-sighted conclusion that Finland's problems could be cured by eliminating the Svecoman upper class and its Young Finn allies.

That view hardened during the Russian integration policy launched by the February Manifesto of 1899. Nya Pressen was suppressed in 1900 and did not reappear until 1906. The scale of the opposition took Saint Petersburg by surprise: the gendarmerie reported that the governor-general was powerless against a secret resistance party, and that the "ultra-Swedish" Nya Pressen was conducting an orchestra made up of the Senate, part of the Diet, the civil service and "the entire Swedish-speaking intelligentsia". By the 1900s the government's opponents were being labelled by colour as well: alongside the "red Fennomans" stood the "red Svecomans", and Nikolay Bobrikov counted Nya Pressen among the reddest papers in Finland. In practice the language question receded while constitutional questions stood in the foreground, and Swedish-speakers were in the front rank of the legal struggle for Finland's autonomy.

== 1906 and the Swedish People's Party ==
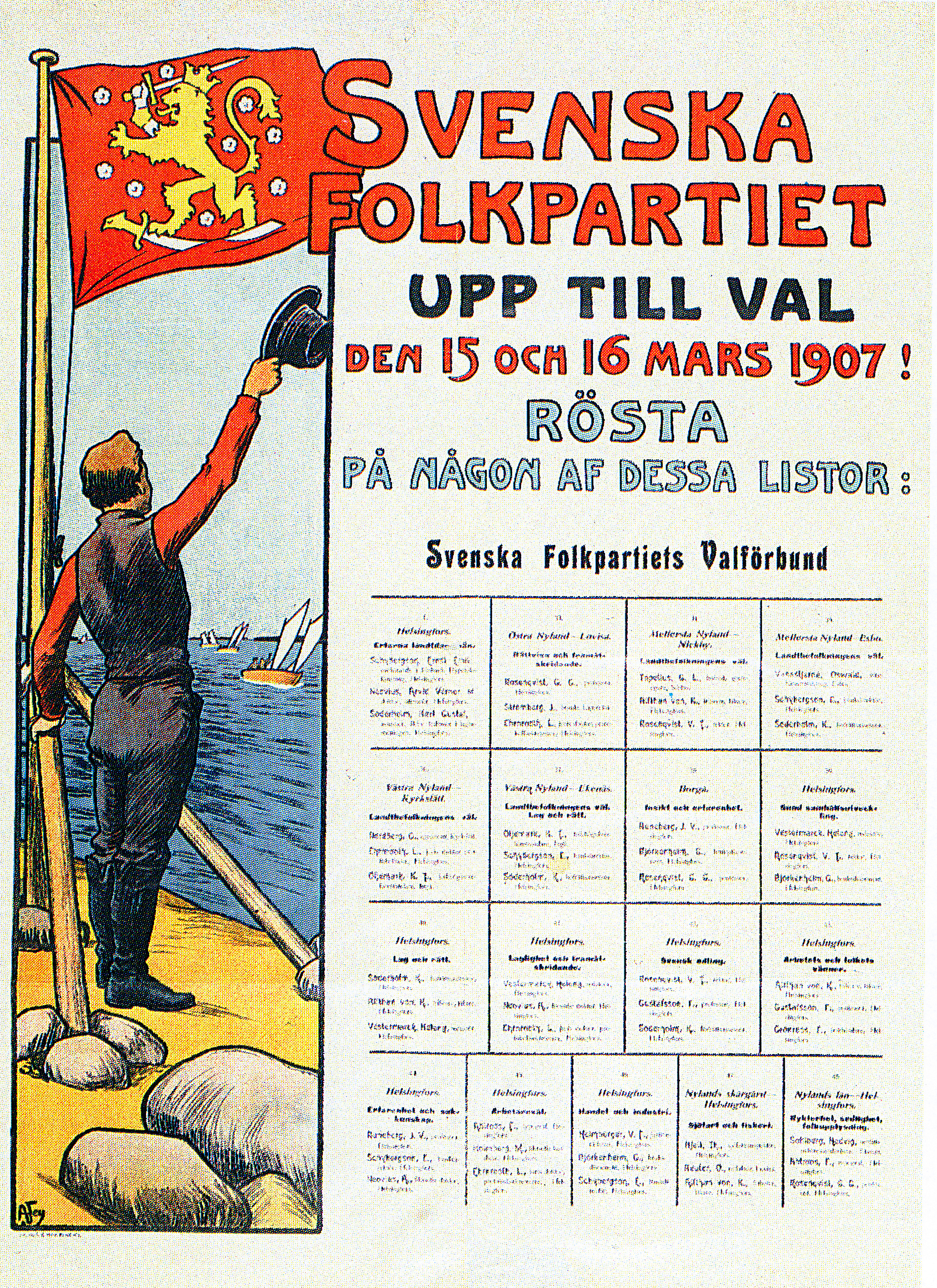
"The man with the flag", drawn by Alex Federley for the Swedish People's Party before the first single-chamber parliamentary election in 1907

The general strike of autumn 1905 forced the suspension of the integration policy and opened the way to reform. In 1906 the Diet of the four estates was replaced by a single-chamber parliament elected by universal and equal suffrage; the electorate grew roughly tenfold, from 126,000 to 1.3 million, and women in Finland were the first in Europe to gain both the vote and the right to stand for election. That changed the terms of Swedish politics. Until 1906 the resources of the Swedish-speaking elite — tradition, education and capital — together with the structure of the four-estate Diet had been enough to hold a political balance between Swedish and Finnish; only when universal suffrage made the Finnish-speaking preponderance visible did the Swedish side have to think in terms of numbers.

The Swedish Party accordingly reconstituted itself in 1906 as the Swedish People's Party. Its founding appeal promised a "constitutional, liberal and popular" party whose chief task was to defend the rights of the country's Swedish-speaking population: universal suffrage, wider powers for the legislature, freedom of religion, trade and association, equality for women, and, in the language question, the right to be heard and to receive documents in one's own language, Swedish and Finnish as the country's official languages, and mother-tongue instruction in state schools. The first single-chamber election, in 1907, showed that the Swedish-speaking population had indeed been mobilised. Compared with the old Swedish Party the new one marked a shift from a language party to a nationality party: Swedishness broadened from a question about the language of officials and schools into one covering everything that concerned the Swedish-speaking population.

== Legacy ==
The movement's harder edges outlived it. Racial arguments, sporadic in the 19th century, became common in the 1910s. The student volume Svenskt i Finland (1914) is usually taken as the breakthrough of racial thinking on the Swedish side, and the student leader Artur Eklund derived the Swedish contribution to Finland directly from "Germanic racial characteristics". Out of this radical wing of rural Swedishness came the East Swedishness of the years around independence, which held the Swedish-speaking population to be a nationality of its own rather than a language group within the Finnish nation; those positions never won much support inside the Swedish People's Party and died away during the 1920s. They also produced a Finland-Swedish self-government movement, which proposed Swedish provinces or "cantons" with the widest possible autonomy, driven above all by fear of Finnicisation and by a dark picture of the Finnish alternative — as was the contemporary Åland movement. Neither obtained what it asked for. No Swedish self-governing province was created on the mainland, and in June 1921 the League of Nations ruled that the Åland Islands would remain Finnish on condition that Finland guarantee their Swedish language and their military neutrality — an outcome the Ålanders, who had wanted union with Sweden, were not satisfied with, but which gave the islands the territorial autonomy the mainland movement never won.

What did last was the Svecomans' first and simplest claim: that the Swedish-speaking farmers of the coast and what remained of the Swedish-speaking educated class belonged together. That idea became the core of the Swedish People's Party, and for this reason 1906 has been given as the birth year of the Swedish-language popular movement in Finland.

== See also ==
- Ethnogenesis
- Finland's language strife
- Kagal — the passive-resistance organisation of 1901–1905
- Nation-building
