= Jan-Magnus Jansson =

Finnish politician

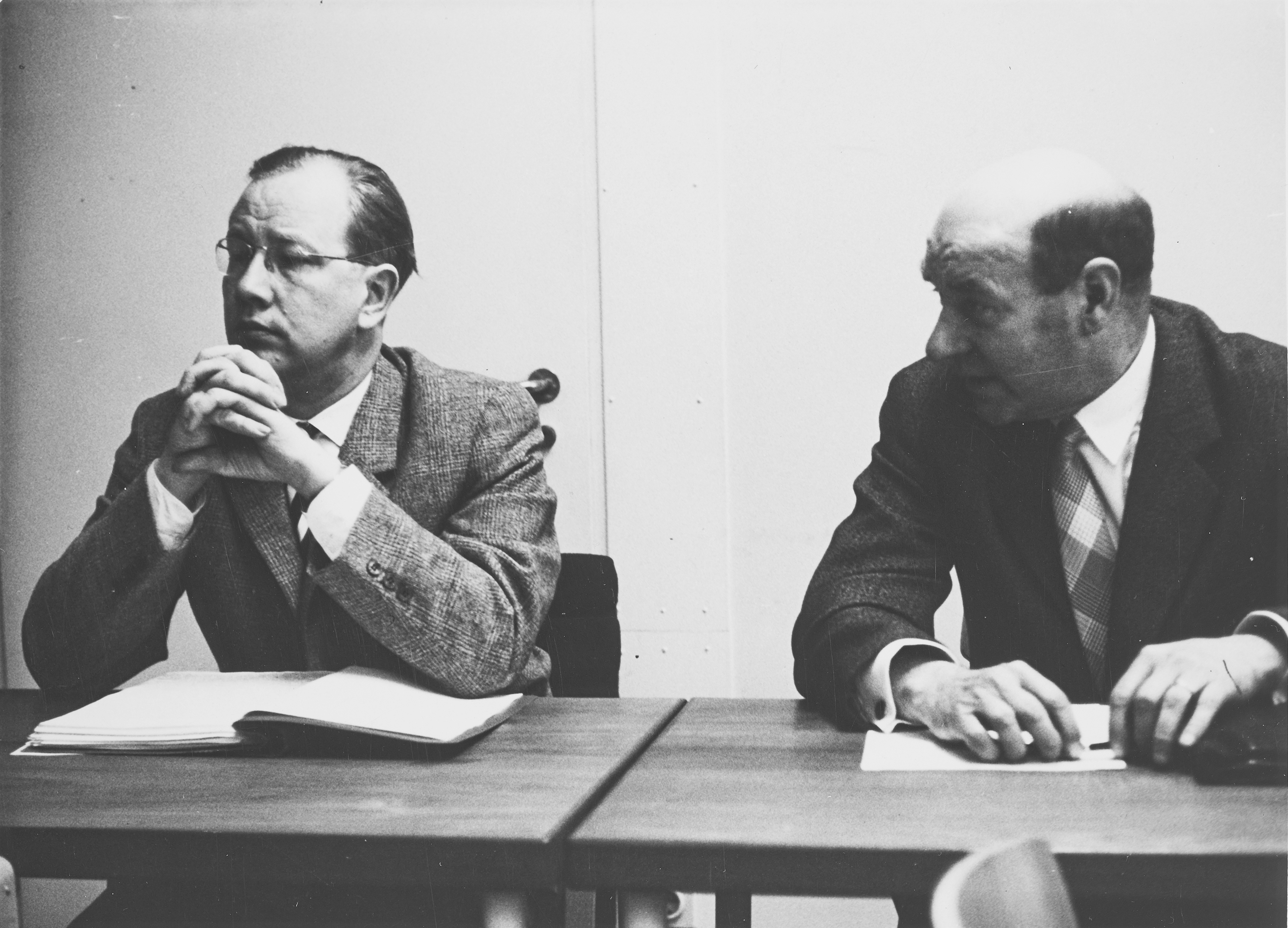
Professors Jan-Magnus Jansson and L. A. Puntila from the University of Helsinki in 1960.

Jan-Magnus Jansson (24 January 1922 in Helsinki – 29 November 2003) was a Finland-Swedish politician and member of the Swedish People's Party.

== Biography ==
=== Education and academic career ===
Jansson studied at Svenska normallyceum i Helsingfors, graduating in 1939, and then at the University of Helsinki, where he earned a Bachelor of Arts in 1946 and a Licentiate of Political Science in 1951. Jansson was named docent of general political science in 1952. He later worked as a Professor of Political Science at the University of Helsinki 1954–1974 and as a dean of the Faculty of Political Science 1971–1972. He was also chancellor for the Åbo Akademi University 1985–1991.

Jansson was appointed an honorary doctor of law at the University of Helsinki in 1990 and an honorary doctor of political science at Åbo Akademi University in 1993.

=== Political career ===
Jansson was a member of Nyliberala studentförbundet 1954–1957 and active in Valtiotieteellinen yhdistys – Statsvetenskapliga föreningen, first as a member and vice chairman, then as chairman in 1956.

Jansson was vice-chairman of the Swedish People's Party (SPP) 1964–1966, and chairman from 1966–1973. Jansson was a minister of trade and industry in Kalevi Sorsa's first government (1 January 1973 - 30 September 1974). Jansson was a presidential elector in 1962, and his party's presidential candidate in the 1982 elections, receiving 11 electoral votes.

Jansson also held several positions as chairman of many parliamentary committees. He became a member of the State Peace and Conflict Research Commission in 1966, the Finnish UNESCO Commission in 1969, the Nordic Commission for International Policy in 1973, the Committee for Emigrant Cooperation in 1977, the State Archipelago Delegation in 1975, the Constitutional Revision Committee in 1982 and the Åland Committee in 1981.

As a politician, Jansson gave his full support to the so-called Paasikivi-Kekkonen doctrine, something he had already supported during his studies. Jansson established himself as an expert in defense and security policy issues. As party chairman, Jansson worked for active cooperation with the Center and the Liberals. In the 1990s, he was against the Finland's membership of European Union which actively threatened the neutrality of Finland's foreign policy.

=== Literary career ===
Jansson was an editor for the magazine Nya Argus from 1947 to 1974, serving as its editor-in-chief from 1959 to 1966. He was also the editor-in-chief of Hufvudstadsbladet from 1974 to 1987.

From 1952, Jansson was a board member of the Society of Swedish Literature in Finland. He wrote several books, for instance about the Finnish Constitution. In total, he published around 2 500 publications, including books, anthology contributions, articles, poems and short stories. His publications include his 1950 academic dissertation on Hans Kelsen's theory of the state, Grundlagsutskottets funktioner vid riksdagarna 1939—1952 (1954), and the political science textbook Politikens teori (1969). Among his poetry collections are Morgon och uppbrott (1944) and Enskild (1952).

== Private life ==
Janssons parents were Gösta Jansson and Anna Elisabeth Kuhlefelt. Jansson was married three times: to Kerstin Edgren from 1948 to 1970, to Marita Brandt from 1970 to 1975, and to Siv Dahlin from 1976.

He is buried in the Hietaniemi Cemetery in Helsinki.

Party political offices
Preceded by Lars Erik Taxell	Chairman of the Swedish People's Party; 1966–1973	Succeeded by Kristian Gestrin
