= Svenska Kvinnoförbundet =

Women's Organisation of the Swedish People's Party in Finland Svenska kvinnoförbundet
- Chairperson: Pia Sundell
- Secretary-General: Agneta Udd-Saarela
- Founded: 1907
- Headquarters: Simonkatu 8 A, Helsinki, Finland
- Ideology: Liberalism; Liberal feminism
- Mother party: Swedish People's Party

Website
- https://www.kvinnoforbundet.fi/sv/startsida/

Svenska Kvinnoförbundet (English: Women's Organisation of the Swedish People's Party in Finland; literally Swedish (-speaking) Women's Federation) is the women's wing of the Swedish People's Party of Finland. The federation was founded in 1907 and has around 2,500 members. The federation consists of 28 local organisations throughout the Swedish-speaking areas of Finland, traditionally known as Svenskfinland.

The organisation is a unifying political forum for Finland-Swedish women who want to work for an equal Finland and defines itself as liberal feminist. It arranges seminars and discussions, shares experiences, takes political initiatives and lobbies at both the national and local political level to highlight the gender perspective in the public debate.

It is at the grassroots level, in local chapters, that much of the activity takes place. The board of directors is the leading body that makes decisions and sets the guidelines for the activities. The board is assisted by various committees and working groups. Anita Westerholm was elected president of the organisation in September 2020.

In June 2020, the organisation launched its own podcast about the everyday lives of women and girls.
