= Lars Erik Taxell =

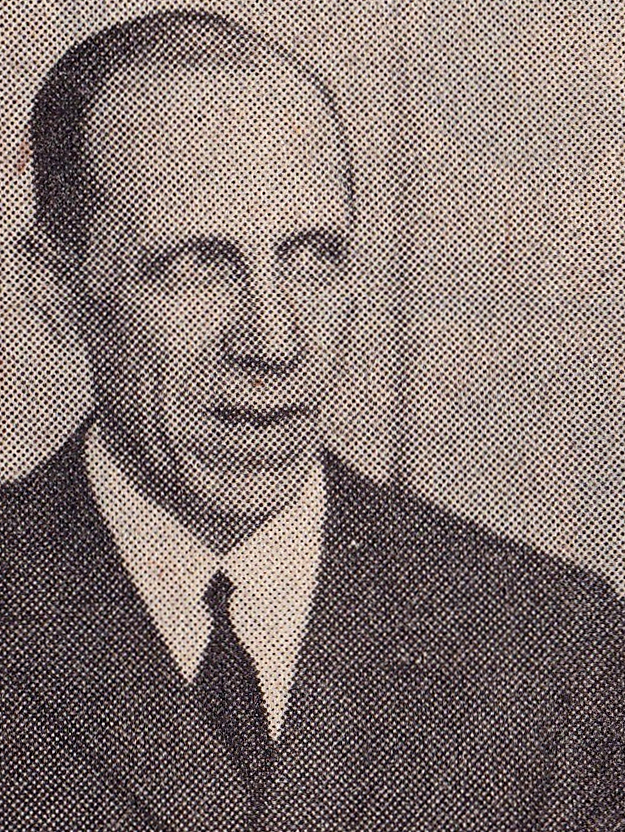
Lars Erik Taxell

Lars Erik Taxell (6 April 1913 – 7 October 2013), was a Finnish legal scholar and politician. He was the leader of the Swedish People's Party of Finland in 1956–1966. He was also the Rector of the Åbo Akademi University in Turku, Finland, in the 1950s and its chancellor in the 1980s.

Taxell was born in Vaasa, in the Grand Duchy of Finland in 1913. He studied law at the University of Helsinki. He earned a PhD in law in 1946, on the fundamental question of the relationship between democracy and the rule of law. In 1948–1976, he was a professor of private law and jurisprudence at the Åbo Akademi. His extensive scientific contributions were mainly in the areas of corporate law and contract law, later also in issues related to law and democracy. Taxell was the first Finnish person to be awarded the Nordic Lawyer Prize in 1984. He served as Chancellor of Åbo Akademi University in 1981–1984, in the early years of Åbo Akademi having become a state university. In 1975 Taxell became an honorary doctor at the Faculty of law at Stockholm University.

In 1956, Taxell succeeded Ernst von Born as the leader of the Swedish People's Party, the Swedish-speaking minority and mainly liberal party in Finland. This was a position he held until 1966, when he was succeeded by Jan-Magnus Jansson. He had a central role in the agreement whereby the Finnish government in 1981 took over the financial responsibility for the private university Åbo Akademi, while the Åbo Akademi Foundation maintained its independent status. Taxell died in 2013 at the age of 100, in Åbo, Finland.

Party political offices
Preceded by Ernst von Born	Chairman of the Swedish People's Party; 1956–1966	Succeeded by Jan-Magnus Jansson
