= Axel Lille =

Finland-Swedish journalist and politician (1848–1921)

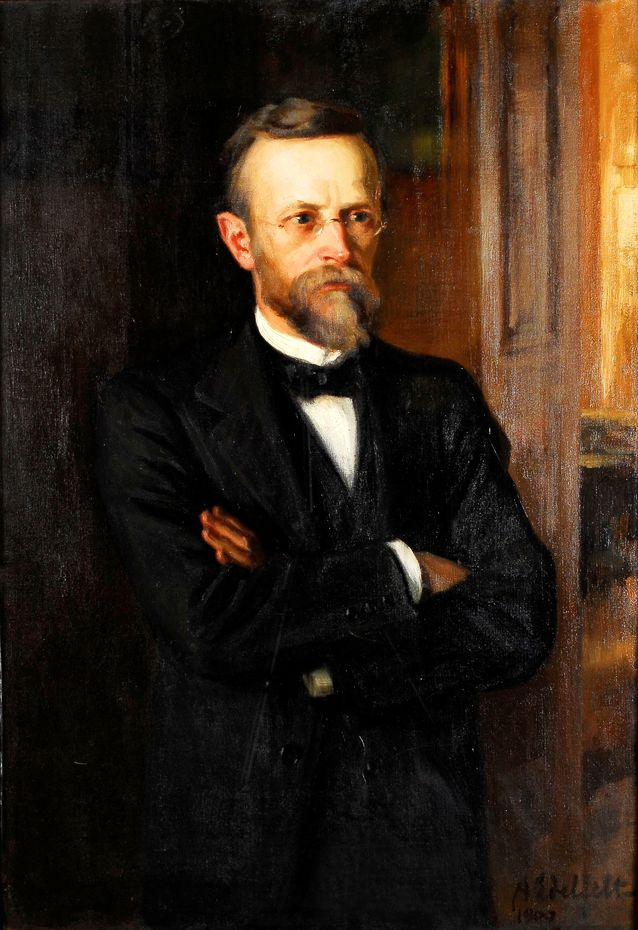
- Axel Lille

Chairman of the Swedish People's Party
- In office 1906–1917
- Preceded by: Office established
- Succeeded by: Eric von Rettig

Member of the Parliament of Finland
- In office 1916–1917

Personal details
- Born: Axel Johan Lille; 28 March 1848 Helsinki, Grand Duchy of Finland
- Died: 28 June 1921 (aged 73) Helsinki, Finland
- Party: Swedish People's Party
- Spouses: Maria Charlotta Waenerberg (m. 1882); Sigrid Aina Wilhelmina Cronstedt (m. 1890)
- Children: Martha Lille
- Parents: Bengt Olof Lille (father); Ida Gustava Waenerberg (mother)
- Education: University of Helsinki
- Occupation: Journalist, lawyer, politician

Axel Johan Lille (28 March 1848 – 28 June 1921) was a Finland-Swedish journalist, lawyer and politician. He was a founder of the Swedish People's Party (Svenska folkpartiet, SFP) and its first chairman from 1906 to 1917. As editor-in-chief of Nya Pressen from 1883 to 1900 and again from 1906 to 1917, he made the newspaper a leading voice for the Finland-Swedish minority and one of the foremost constitutionalist organs during the Russification period under Russian imperial rule. After Nya Pressen was shut down by the censors in 1900, Lille lived in exile in Sweden from 1902 to 1905. He served as a member of the Diet of Finland for the Burgher Estate in every Diet between 1885 and 1900, and was elected to the Parliament of Finland in 1916. Under his chairmanship, the SFP in the spring of 1917 became the first Finnish political party to publicly call for Finland's independence.

== Biography ==
=== Early life and studies ===
Lille's parents were Bengt Olof Lille and Ida Gustava Waenerberg. He graduated from the Helsingfors privatlyceum in 1866, and in the same year he joined the illegal Nyländska nationen, which was legalized two years later as the Nyländska avdelningen. He contributed to the branch's newspaper, Nylands Dragon, and also published the humor magazine Myggan. In 1879, Lille succeeded Professor A. O. Freudenthal as curator of Nyländska avdelningen, a position he held until 1888. He belonged to the circle of Finland-Swedish students who gathered around Freudenthal, an association that would shape his political outlook throughout his career.

He graduated with a Bachelor of Arts degree in 1872, a Master of Arts degree in 1873, and a Candidate of Laws degree in 1879, majoring in economic law. He was then enrolled as a junior clerk at the Turku Court of Appeal. He received his doctorate in 1882 after defending his thesis Försäkringsväsendet, dess historiska utveckling och nationalekonomiska betydelse.

=== Journalism and Nya Pressen ===
Lille began his career as a journalist in 1870 as one of the founders and publishers of the newspaper Wikingen. In 1873 he was the responsible publisher of Wiborgsbladet.

In 1882, Lille was one of the co-founders of Nya Pressen, a newspaper intended to serve as a leading organ for Finland-Swedish cultural and educational interests. The following year he became its editor-in-chief. Under his leadership, Nya Pressen grew into one of the country's leading newspapers, with nationwide circulation. After the liberal Helsingfors Dagblad was squeezed out of the market between the Finnish-nationalist and Swedish-nationalist camps, Nya Pressen became one of the principal organs of the Finland-Swedish movement. Its circulation rose from some 1,500 copies in its first year to 4,500 by 1888, and exceeded 10,000 during the height of the Russification crisis around 1899.

After Nikolay Bobrikov became Governor-General, Lille fought vigorously in Nya Pressen for the defense of the constitution, until the newspaper was closed down in 1900. He was then editor-in-chief of the newspaper Dagligt allehanda, which was founded instead, until it was also closed down in 1901.

=== Exile and return ===
At Nyländska avdelningen's annual celebration in 1902, Lille gave a speech in which he publicly raised the idea of Finland's separation from Russia, which contributed to his decision to leave the country. In 1902, he moved to Stockholm, where he worked as a publicist at Stockholms-Tidningen, and became a Swedish citizen in 1903. His voluntary exile drew criticism back in Finland, including from several Finland-Swedish constitutionalists who accused him of betrayal and desertion. In 1905, after the general strike and the November Manifesto, he returned to Finland, where he again became editor of Nya Pressen, which was re-established in early 1906.

=== Swedish People's Party and the Diet ===
Before the revival of Nya Pressen, Lille drew up a program for the newspaper which also served as a platform for the political unification of the Finland-Swedish movement; it was published in December 1905. The idea of a unified Swedish-language party had occupied Lille for some time: as early as 1896, he had convened a general party meeting in Helsinki, attended by 741 party members. In 1906, he actively advocated for the formation of a new progressive and liberal party with an extensive reform program. A new meeting was held in May of that year at Nyländska avdelningen's house on Kaserngatan in Helsinki. As a result of the meeting, it was agreed to create a new Swedish-language party, the Swedish People's Party (Svenska folkpartiet, SFP). The name was Lille's suggestion, but had been officially proposed by bank director Emil Schybergson at the meeting.

During this meeting, a party program was also agreed upon, and at Lille's suggestion, social issues were also removed from the program, and thus the different factions were able to agree on the program, despite differences of opinion. Lille became the party's first chairman.

Lille served as a member of the Diet of Finland for the Burgher Estate in 1885 and 1888 for Kokkola and in 1891, 1894, 1897, 1899 and 1900 for Helsinki.

In 1907, Lille was elected chairman of the Finlands svenska publicistförbund (Swedish-language press association of Finland), of which he had also been the initiator. He held this position for ten years.

Lille remained as editor-in-chief of Nya Pressen (which in the meantime had merged with Dagens Tidning to form Dagens Press) until 1917. He resigned from the chairmanship of the Swedish People's Party the same year, disappointed that the party's politics had not developed in the direction he had hoped. That same year he was elected as a member of the Parliament of Finland. In the spring of 1917, following the February Revolution in Russia, Lille was the driving force behind a statement from the SFP in which the party, as the first of the Finnish political parties, explicitly demanded Finland's independence.

=== Later years ===
Having stepped down from both the party leadership and the editorship in 1917, Lille devoted his final years to public commentary, business and writing. After the end of the Civil War in 1918, he was appointed Finland's press representative in Stockholm and managed to win sympathy in wide circles for the Finnish points of view, but was soon recalled by the Finnish authorities.

Lille was also a member of the Städernas i Finland brandstodsbolag, whose board he had been on since 1882, as chairman 1886–1902 and 1906–1916. In 1917, he was elected secretary of the Städernas i Finland brandstodsbolag, and in 1918 he served for a short time as managing director of the Fennia Insurance Company.

In the years 1918–1921, Lille made contributions both as a historian and a national opinion-former. In June 1918, he published the pamphlet Till den svenska arbetaren, in which he summarized the causes of the civil war that had struck the country. The following year, he published a collection of essays in which he described his contributions as a Finnish press representative in Sweden. His greatest work is considered to be Den svenska nationalitetens i Finland samlingsrörelse, a monograph of over a thousand pages that he published in 1921. During his last years, Lille also made his debut as a playwright with the play Lyckans galoscher (1920), which was performed both at the Åbo Svenska Teater and at the Swedish Theatre in Helsinki in 1920–1921. Despite his declining health, he also worked as a correspondent in the capital for Åbo Underrättelser. With his death in 1921, Lille was the last of the prominent Finland-Swedish public figures of the late 19th and early 20th centuries, a group that also included A. O. Freudenthal, Leo Mechelin and Carl Gustaf Estlander.

=== Private life ===
Lille married Maria Charlotta Waenerberg in 1882 and Sigrid Aina Wilhelmina Cronstedt in 1890. In his second marriage he had a daughter, journalist Martha Lille.

== Bibliography ==
- Rätt är rätt: Folkskådespel i fyra akter och en tablå (1877)
- Tvenne dramatiska teckningar ur folklifvet (1878)
- Anders Chydenius i förhållande till samtida nationalekonomer (1882)
- Försäkringsväsendet, dess historiska utveckling och nationalekonomiska betydelse (1882)
- Nationalitetsprincipen och dess tillämpning på förhållandena i Finland (1882)
- On the validity of the fundamental laws of Finland (1892)
- Nannas dosa (1897)
- Björnsons ryska bref bedömda i Finland (1903)
- Framtidsuppgifter (1918)
- Ett halvt år såsom Finlands pressrepresentant i Sverige (1919)
- Språkstriden i Finland (1920)
- Den svenska nationalitetens i Finland samlingsrörelse : Anteckningar (1921)
- Lyckans galoscher: Lustspel i tre akter (1921)

== Literature ==
- Svenskt i Finland (1914)
- Axel Lille. En levnadsteckning (1931, by Max Hanemann)
- Svenska Folkpartiet. Bakgrund, tillblivelse och utveckling till 1917 (1956, by Göran von Bonsdorff)
- Min far i närbild. En minnesteckning över Axel Lille baserad på hans brev (1965, by Martha Lille)

Party political offices
First	Leader of the Swedish People's Party; 1906–1917	Succeeded by Eric von Rettig
