= Håkan Andersson (professor) =

Finnish professor (born 1940)

Lars Paul Håkan Andersson, born 14 March 1940 in Jakobstad, is a Finland-Swedish professor of pedagogy. He was acting professor 1974–1984 at the Faculty of Education at Åbo Akademi University in Vaasa and professor there 1984–2003. He was principal of the University of Ostrobothnia (which later switched names to simply Åbo Akademi) 1995–1998. From 2000 to 2010 he was chairman of the Society of Swedish Literature in Finland. He is known for his long-standing commitment to the Swedish language and culture in Finland.

Andersson's parents were Paul Andersson and Siri Isomaa. Andersson graduated from Jakobstads samlyceum in 1959 and then began studies in history and pedagogy at Åbo Akademi University. He graduated with a Bachelor of Arts there in 1966 and a Licentiate of Arts in 1970. He worked as a senior lecturer in history at Jakobstads samlyceum in 1966–1967 and then became an assistant in pedagogy at Åbo Akademi University. In 1979 he completed his thesis, Kampen om det förflutna. Studier i historieundervisningens målfrågor i Finland 1843–1917.

Andersson has made a large contribution to the Society of Swedish Literature in Finland. He was elected to the board in 1980, became vice-chairman in 1992 and chairman from 2000–2010. During this time, Andersson has strived for expansion, visibility and commitment to Swedish in Finland, for example by emphasizing the importance of relevant research and through the publication of literature.

Andersson married Katarina Wilkman in 1969. In 2010, the couple established a foundation, Håkan och Katarina Anderssons fond, whose purpose is to "encourage and support the art of speaking and language proficiency in Swedish in Finland."

== Bibliography ==
- Finlandssvenskt forsknings- och utvecklingsarbete (1973)
- Kampen om det förflutna (1979)
- Föredrag och inlägg i pedagogiska frågor (1981)
- Projektorganiserade studier inom universitetsutbildningen (1981)
- Svenska läroverket i Jakobstad 1904–1979 (1983)
- Bedömning av undervisningsförmågan. Studier i handlednings- och bedömningsprocesser inom lärarutbildningen (1984)
- Skollärarföreningen i Vasa 1848–1852 (1988)
- Kampen om lärohusen. Studier kring statsmakt och föräldrarätt i nordisk skolutveckling (tillsammans med andra, 1994)
- Österbotten och lärdomen (2007)
