= Swedish Literature Bank =

Swedish non-profit organization

Logo

The Swedish Literature Bank is a non-profit organisation whose objective is making classic Swedish literature and literary criticism freely available in digital editions. It is a collaboration between the Swedish Academy, the National Library of Sweden, the Royal Swedish Academy of Letters, History and Antiquities, the Swedish Language Bank at the University of Gothenburg, the Swedish Society for Belles-Lettres, and the Society of Swedish Literature in Finland.

The Swedish Literature Bank publishes Swedish literary classics from the Middle Ages on, including "minor classics" and major historical and religious works, in four digital formats: searchable e-text, facsimiles of the original edition, PDF files and EPUB files. The texts are based either on the first edition or on a subsequent scholarly edition. Authoritative presentations of authors and genres are also provided.

The initiative began after a suggestion by Sven Lindqvist in the early 2000s. The Swedish Academy held a seminar exploring the idea in 2002, and in 2004 a two-year pilot project began with funding from the Bank of Sweden Tercentenary Foundation. The project foundation was then organised in 2006. Starting at a time of rapid expansion of Swedish higher education institutions, the project was designed to address the problem of the many new Swedish colleges needing to set up libraries with expensive older literature, and to make older Swedish literature freely available anywhere in the world. In contrast to the older Project Runeberg, where anyone can help proofread the scans, the Literature Bank texts are proofread by scholars. They are chosen by an editorial committee, around certain themes such as works by female writers, older crime fiction and science fiction, and from suggestions by the public. The project has been described as "a Swedish mini-variant of Google Library".
