= Liberalism and centrism in Finland =

This article gives an overview of liberalism and centrism in Finland. It is limited to liberal and centrist parties with substantial support, mainly proved by having had a representation in parliament. The sign ⇒ means a reference to another party in that scheme. For inclusion in this scheme it is not necessary so that parties labeled themselves as a liberal party.

Liberalism was a major force in Finland since 1894. After independence the current gradually decreased. A major other force, agrarianism, choose in 1965 to develop itself into a more centrist current. The liberal character of the Finnish Center (Suomen Keskusta), member of LI and ELDR, is based on liberal ideas like decentralization, peasant-like freedom and progressivism. The Swedish minority party Swedish People's Party (Svenska Folkpartiet i Finland) is also a member of LI, ELDR. The original liberal current is now organized in the Liberals (Liberaalit), a very small extra-parliamentary party. At the autonomous island of Åland the Liberals for Åland (Liberalerna på Åland) are a dominant force.

== The timeline ==
=== Liberal Club / Liberal Party ===
- 1877: Liberals formed the Liberal Club (Liberaalinen Klubi), renamed in 1880 Liberal Party (Liberaalinen Puolue)
- 1882: The Liberal Party disappeared

=== From Young Finnish Party to Liberals ===
- 1894: Constitutionalist fennomans organized into the Young Finnish faction within the Finnish Party (Nuorsuomalainen Puolue)
- 1905: The Young Finnish Party secedes from the Finnish Party.
- 1918: The Republican factions of the two Finnish parties reorganise into the Progressive Party (Kansallinen Edistyspuolue)
- 1951: The Progressive Party falls apart into the Finnish People's Party (Suomen Kansanpuolue) and the ⇒ Free-minded League (Vapaamielisten liitto)
- 1965: The People's Party and the ⇒ Free-minded League reunite into the Liberal People's Party (Liberaalinen Kansanpuolue)
- 1982: The Liberal People's Party associated itself with the ⇒ Centre Party, whilst some liberal youth activists join the Greens.
- 1983: The Liberal People's Party loses all of seats in the Parliament for the first time.
- 1986: The Liberal People's Party disassociated itself from the ⇒ Centre Party
- 1991: The Liberal People's Party returns to parliament with one MP.
- 1995: The Liberal People's Party loses its only MP.
- 2000: The Liberal People's Party renames itself Liberals (Liberaalit)
- 2007: Removed from the party registry after failing to get a seat in two consecutive parliamentary elections

=== Swedish People's Party ===
- 1906: Liberal svekomans formed the present-day Swedish People's Party in Finland (Svenska Folkpartiet i Finland)
- 1919: Republicans formed the Liberal Swedish Party (Svensk Vänster)
- 1951: Liberal Swedish Party merged with SFP

=== People's Party ===
- 1917: Progressive liberals formed the People's Party (Kansanpuolue)
- 1918: The People's Party merged into the ⇒ National Progressive Party

=== Free-minded League ===
- 1951: The ⇒ National Progressive Party fell apart and the Free-minded League (Vapaamielisten Liitto) is formed
- 1965: The League merged with the ⇒ Finnish People's Party into the ⇒ Liberal People's Party

=== Centre Party / Finnish Centre ===
Centrists

- 1965: The agrarian Agrarian League (Maalaisliitto) reorganised itself into the Centre Party (Keskustapuolue).
- 1988: The Centre Party is renamed Finnish Centre (Suomen Keskusta)

=== Liberal Party – Freedom to Choose ===
- 2015: Liberal Party - Freedom to Choose is formed.
- 2023: Liberal Party publishes #LeikattavaaLöytyy shadow budget to balance the national budget.

=== Åland ===
==== Liberals for Åland ====
- 1967: Liberals organised itself into the Centrist Liberals (Mittenliberalerna)
- 1971: The Centrist Liberals are renamed Electoral Union Liberal Assembly (Valforbundet Liberal Samling)
- 1978: VLS and ⇒ LoS–Liberals merged into the Liberals for Åland (Liberalerna på Åland)

==== Centre Party ====
- 1967: The Rural and Archipelago Electoral Union (Landsbygdens och Skargardens Valforbund) was founded
- 1975: The LoS–Liberals (LoS–Liberalerna) seceded from the Rural and Archipelago Electoral Union
- 1976: The Rural and Archipelago Electoral Union is renamed Åland Centre (Åländska Centern)
- 1978: VLS and ⇒ LoS–Liberals merged into the ⇒ Liberals for Åland

== Liberal and centrist leaders ==
- Kansallinen Edistyspuolue: Kaarlo Juho Ståhlberg
- Maalaisliitto/Keskustapuolue: Urho Kekkonen
- Keskusta: Esko Aho - Anneli Jäätteenmäki - Matti Vanhanen - Mari Kiviniemi - Juha Sipilä
- Svenska Folkpartiet: Ole Norrback - Jan-Erik Enestam - Stefan Wallin - Carl Haglund

== Liberal thinkers ==
In the Contributions to liberal theory the following Finnish thinker is included:

- Santeri Alkio (Finland, 1862–1930)
- Anders Chydenius (Finland, 1729–1803)

== See also ==
- History of Finland
- Politics of Finland
- List of political parties in Finland
