= Carl Gustaf Estlander =

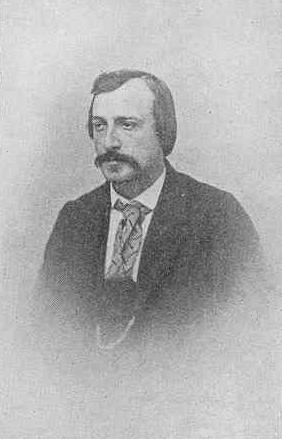
- Carl Gustaf Estlander
- Born: January 31, 1834; Lappfjärd, Finland
- Died: August 28, 1910 (aged 76); Helsinki, Finland
- Occupations: Professor, cultural politician, publicist
- Known for: Co-founder of the Society of Swedish Literature in Finland; driving force behind the Ateneum

Carl Gustaf Estlander (31 January 1834 – 28 August 1910) was a Finland-Swedish professor of aesthetics and modern literature at the University of Helsinki, cultural politician and publicist. He was one of the founders of the Society of Swedish Literature in Finland and a leading proponent of the so-called cultural Swedish (kultursvenska) line in the Finnish language conflict of the latter half of the 19th century. As chairman of the Finnish Art Society and a driving force behind the establishment of the Ateneum, he played a decisive role in building Finland's art and cultural institutions.

== Biography ==
Estlander was born into an educated clerical family in Lappfjärd, Ostrobothnia. His father, Jakob Jonas Estlander, was the local vicar. Carl Gustaf was the brother of Jakob August Estlander and father of Bernhard Estlander. He was a second cousin of Yrjö Koskinen.

=== Academic career ===
Estlander enrolled at the University of Helsinki in 1850 and studied history, philology and aesthetics, graduating as a candidate of philosophy in 1856 and as master (primus) in 1857. He earned his doctorate in 1858 with a dissertation on Richard the Lionheart in history and poetry, and qualified as a docent in 1859 with a study of the folk legends of Robin Hood. In 1859–1860 he travelled to Denmark, Germany, Belgium and France to study art. He was appointed docent in aesthetics and modern literature in 1860 and took his doctor's degree in the historico-philological faculty the same year. In 1863–1865 he undertook a further research journey, with public funding, to Denmark, Germany, France, England, Italy and Spain to study the fine arts and medieval literature, including the Tristan legend and the Ossianic traditions.

In spring 1866 he gave a series of popular lectures on the history of the fine arts in Helsinki, and in 1867 published in Stockholm the six-hundred-page History of the Fine Arts from the End of the Previous Century to Our Days, the fruit of his extensive studies. When Fredrik Cygnaeus retired as professor emeritus in 1867, Estlander was appointed to act in his place, and in 1868, following a dissertation on Provençal literature, he was appointed full professor of aesthetics and modern literature. He was granted the title of councillor of chancery in 1891 and councillor of state in 1898, the same year he was elevated to the nobility and retired from his professorship.

=== Language politics and the cultural Swedish line ===
Estlander was the leading theorist of the so-called cultural Swedish (Swedish: kultursvenska) line in the Finnish language conflict. His position rested on the idea that the Finnish nation was a bilingual community, bound together by shared historical experience and legal tradition rather than by linguistic or ethnic homogeneity. He opposed both Johan Vilhelm Snellman's Hegelian vision of a monolingual nation and Axel Olof Freudenthal's narrower regional Swedish identity, arguing instead that the Swedish cultural heritage was an indispensable part of the entire nation's culture.

Estlander gave Johan Ludvig Runeberg a programmatic central role as the symbol of the undivided, bilingual nation. His scholarly work Runebergs skaldskap (1902), a critical commentary to the standard edition of Runeberg's collected works, carried political significance beyond its literary-historical value by presenting the poet's work as a living patriotic symbol. His essay "Min ställning i språkfrågan" ("My position in the language question"), published in Finsk Tidskrift in 1887, provoked fierce polemics from his Fennoman opponents while earning him warm recognition from his own camp.

In 1885 he was one of the founders of the Society of Swedish Literature in Finland, serving as chairman of its board until 1897 and thereafter as honorary chairman. He saw to it that the society was founded the day after the unveiling of the Runeberg monument in Helsinki in March 1885, thereby marking its patriotic character.

=== Art politics and institution building ===
Estlander served the development of Finnish art as secretary of the Finnish Art Society in 1869–1876 and as its chairman in 1878–1896. In 1871 he founded a craft school in Helsinki on his own initiative, having observed during his European study tours that Finland compared poorly with the other Nordic countries in arts and crafts education. He was a driving force in the decade-long process that led to the establishment of the Ateneum art museum; the building, designed by Theodor Höijer, was inaugurated in 1887 and at Estlander's suggestion was adorned with the motto Concordia res parvae crescunt (Through concord small things grow).

He also worked actively to promote the applied arts and crafts industry, and was one of the founders of the Association for Arts and Crafts in Finland, serving as its vice chairman in 1876–1882.

=== Publishing ===
Estlander became a publicist early in his career. In summer 1856 he deputised for Zacharias Topelius as editor of Helsingfors Tidningar, and in 1862–1863 he was a member of the editorial board of Helsingfors Dagblad, in whose founding he had also participated. His greatest significance as a publicist, however, lies in his role as editor (until 1886) of Finsk Tidskrift (Finnish Journal for Literature, Science, Art and Politics), whose first issue appeared in October 1876. He made the journal a central organ for literary work in Swedish in Finland and contributed to it extensively as an author and critic. He opposed the naturalism then emerging in Nordic literature with considerable sharpness, while equally condemning the content-poor rhetoric of the Romantic epigones.

== Legacy ==
Estlander was a fellow of the Royal Society of Arts and Sciences in Gothenburg (1878), an honorary member of the Royal Academy of Fine Arts in Stockholm (1885), and a fellow of the Royal Society of Sciences in Uppsala (1890), the Royal Swedish Academy of Letters, History and Antiquities (1904) and the Royal Swedish Academy of Sciences (1907). A medal was struck in his honour at his 70th birthday in 1904. His grave monument with portrait bust at the Hietaniemi Cemetery in Helsinki was executed by Walter Runeberg and erected by the Society of Swedish Literature in Finland.

== Selected works ==
- De bildande konsternas historia ifrån slutet af förra århundradet intill våra dagar (History of the Fine Arts, Stockholm, 1867; new ed. 1925)
- Bidrag till den provencaliska litteraturens historia (1868)
- Vid konstflitens härdar i Tyskland, Österrike, Schweiz och Belgien (1875)
- J. L. Runebergs estetiska åsigter (1887)
- Hippolyte Flandrin, hans lefnad och verk (1890)
- Vitterhetens utveckling hos de nyare folken i medeltiden (1900)
- Runebergs skaldskap (1902)
- Från flydda tider (1905)
