= Eric von Rettig =

Finnish business executive and politician (1867–1937)

von Rettig in 1927

Eric Walter von Rettig (26 January 1867 – 20 July 1937) was a Finnish business executive and politician, born in Gävle. He was a member of the Diet of Finland in 1900, from 1904 to 1905 and from 1905 to 1906 and of the Parliament of Finland from 1917 to 1919, representing the Swedish People's Party of Finland. He was the chairman of the Swedish People's Party of Finland from 1917 to 1934. He was a presidential elector in the 1925 and 1925 presidential elections.
