= Swedish People's Party of Finland =

Finnish political party

Swedish People's Party of Finland Svenska folkpartiet i Finland (Swedish) Suomen ruotsalainen kansanpuolue (Finnish)
- Abbreviation: Swedish: SFP; Finnish: RKP, R
- Chairperson: Anders Adlercreutz
- Secretary: Fredrik Guseff
- Parliamentary group leader: Otto Andersson (Member of the Finnish Parliament)
- Deputy chairs: Ramieza Mahdi; Cecilia Ehrnrooth; Sandra Bergqvist
- Chair of the party council: Eva Biaudet
- Founded: 1906
- Headquarters: Simonkatu 8A, 00100 Helsinki, Finland
- Newspaper: Medborgarbladet
- Think tank: Ajatushautomo Agenda
- Student wing: Liberala Studerande LSK
- Youth wing: Svensk Ungdom
- Women's wing: Svenska Kvinnoförbundet
- Seniors' wing: Förbundet Svenska Seniorer i Finland
- Membership (2025): ▼24,000
- Ideology: Swedish-speaking minority interests; Liberalism
- Political position: Centre to centre-right
- European affiliation: Alliance of Liberals and Democrats for Europe
- European Parliament group: Renew Europe
- International affiliation: Liberal International
- Nordic affiliation: Centre Group
- Colours: Blue (official); Red; Black; Light yellow
- Eduskunta (Note: Including the Åland Coalition representative, who sits with the SFP group): 10 / 200 (5%)
- European Parliament: 1 / 15 (7%)
- Municipalities: 452 / 8,586
- County seats: 71 / 1,379

Website
- sfp.fi

The Swedish People's Party of Finland (SPP; Swedish: Svenska folkpartiet i Finland, SFP; Finnish: Suomen ruotsalainen kansanpuolue, RKP) is a Finnish political party founded in 1906. Its primary aim is to represent the interests of the minority Swedish-speaking population of Finland. The party is currently a participant of the Government of Petteri Orpo, holding the posts of Minister of Education and Minister for European Affairs and Ownership Steering, along with the post of Minister of Youth, Sport and Physical Activity until 13 June 2025.

An ethnic catch-all party, its main election issue since its inception has been the Swedish-speaking Finns' right to their own language while maintaining the position of Swedish as an official language in Finland. Ideologically, it is liberal, social-liberal, centrist, and pro-European. The party has been in government from 1979 to 2015 and again from 2019, with one or two ministerial portfolios in government, and has collaborated with parties across the left–right political spectrum in parliament.

The fact that the winning party in Finland has usually needed the support from the party to form a coalition government has meant that the SPP has been able to affect the politics of Finland on a larger scale than the party's actual size would suggest. The continued position of Swedish as one of two official languages in Finland in the face of a steady erosion of the Swedish speakers' share of the Finnish population from 12% at independence compared to 5% today, as well as the preservation of the Swedish-speaking minority's right to engage in Swedish culture, are two examples of the party's influence in Finnish politics. The party is a member of the Liberal International, the Alliance of Liberals and Democrats for Europe, and Renew Europe. The youth organisation of the party is called Svensk Ungdom (Swedish Youth).

== History and electorate ==
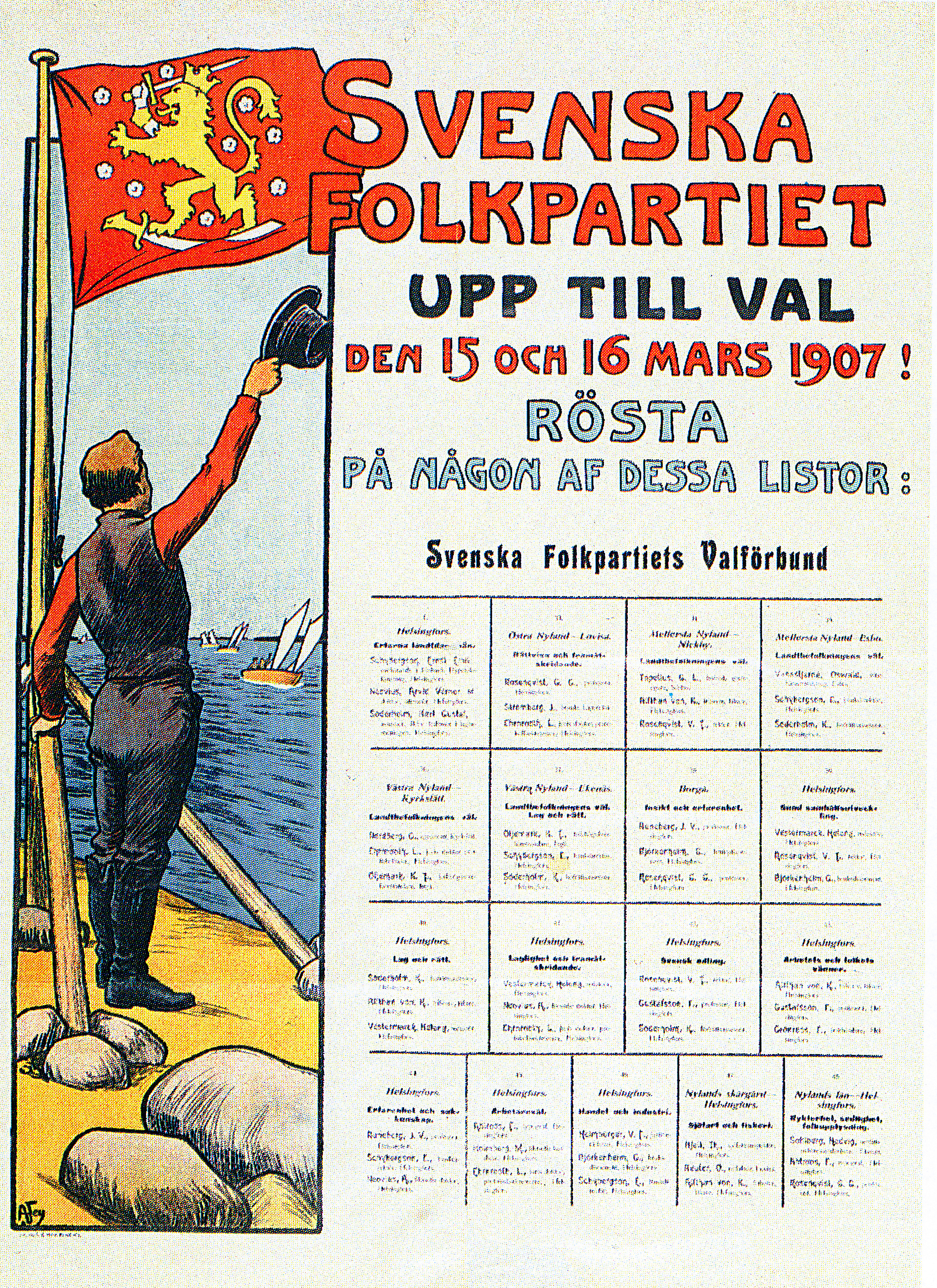
Swedish People's Party election poster from 1907, with ”the man with the flag”, that after this was used as party emblem for over 50 years. Designed by Alex Federley.

The Swedish Party (1870–1906), a parliamentary elite party based on members in the Diet of Finland, is the historical predecessor of the Swedish People's Party of Finland. It was a part of the Svecoman movement and its main policy was opposition of the Fennoman movement.

Unlike Fennomans, who were largely liberal on matters other than the language question, the Svecoman were conservative. Axel Lille and Axel Olof Freudenthal are often considered as the main "founding fathers" of the movement. Most members of the Liberal Party joined the Swedish Party in the 1880s, after the Liberals ceased to exist as a distinct party. The Swedish People's Party of Finland was founded in the 1906 party congress of the Swedish Party, making it one of the oldest parties in Finland. The first leader of the Swedish People's Party was Axel Lille.

The current leader of the party is Anders Adlercreutz. In the Parliament of Finland the representative for Åland is usually included in SPP's parliamentary group, regardless of his/her party affiliation; parties on Åland are separate from those on the mainland, but their common interest in Swedish-language issues gives them much in common with the Swedish People's Party group in national politics.

The party receives its main electoral support from the Swedish speaking minority, which makes up about 5.5% of Finland's population. During its history, the party has suffered slow but steady decline in adherence, following the decline of the percentage of Swedish-speaking population. In 1907, the party received 12% of national votes; after World War II, it received 7% of the vote; and in the 2011 parliamentary election, it received 4.3% of the votes (and nine MPs). In municipal elections, it holds large majorities in municipalities with a Swedish-speaking majority.

Despite its position as one of the minor political parties in the Finnish parliament, it has frequently been one of the partners forming the governing coalition cabinets. Since 1956, the year when Urho Kekkonen was elected President, the party has been nearly continuously in the government. It has been part of all coalitions with the significant exception of Paasio's first cabinet (1966–68), which included only socialists (Social Democratic Party (SDP), the split SDP faction Social Democratic Union of Workers and Smallholders and Finnish People's Democratic League) and the Centre Party.

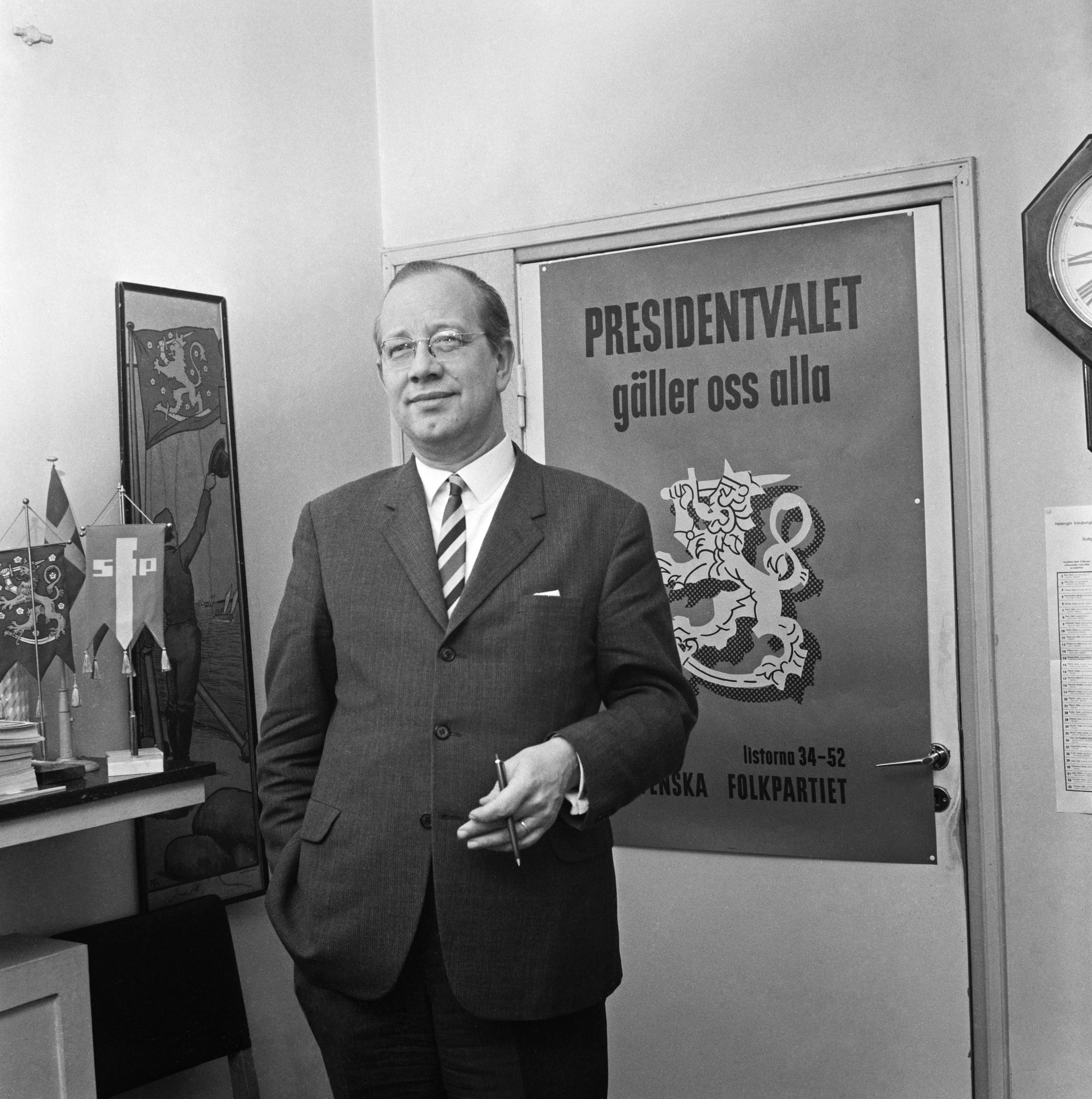
Chairman of the Swedish People’s Party of Finland Jan-Magnus Jansson from 1966 to 1973.

Short periods of rule by single-party minority governments, Miettunen cabinet (1961–62, Centre) and Paasio's second government (1972, SDP) and of nonpartisan caretaker governments have also interrupted its stay in the government. For this reason, the SPP is often criticized for being a single-issue party that allegedly accepts nearly all other policies as long as its own vital interest, the status of the Swedish language is maintained.

However, although Vanhanen's first cabinet made Swedish a voluntary subject in the upper secondary schools' matriculation exam, the SPP remained in the government. In contrast, the Greens left the previous government after a new nuclear power plant was decided in 2002.

The SPP's long continuous participation in the Finnish cabinets came to an end in following the 2015 parliamentary election when it was left out of the Sipilä Cabinet. In June 2019, the SPP returned to government with two ministerial positions in the Rinne Cabinet, the Minister of Justice and the Minister for Nordic Cooperation and Equality.

Recently, the SPP has emphasized the liberal part of its programme, attempting to woo voters outside its traditional Swedish-speaking electorate. In 2010, the party added the word Suomen ("of Finland") to its official Finnish name.

== Election results ==
=== Parliament of Finland ===
Election	Votes	%	Seats	+/-	Government
1907	112,267	12.60	24 / 200		Opposition
1908	103,146	12.74	24 / 200	Steady	Opposition
1909	104,191	12.31	25 / 200	▲1	Opposition
1910	107,121	13.53	26 / 200	▲1	Opposition
1911	106,810	13.31	26 / 200	Steady	Opposition
1913	94,672	13.07	25 / 200	▼1	Opposition
1916	93,555	11.76	21 / 200	▼4	Opposition
1917	108,190	10.90	21 / 200	Steady	Coalition
1919	116,582	12.13	22 / 200	▲1	Coalition (1919)
1919	116,582	12.13	22 / 200	▲1	Opposition (1919-1920)
1919	116,582	12.13	22 / 200	▲1	Coalition (1920-1921)
1919	116,582	12.13	22 / 200	▲1	Opposition (1921-1922)
1922	107,414	12.41	25 / 200	▲3	Opposition
1924	105,733	12.03	23 / 200	▼2	Coalition (1924-1925)
1924	105,733	12.03	23 / 200	▼2	Opposition (1925-1927)
1927	111,005	12.20	24 / 200	▲1	Opposition
1929	108,886	11.45	23 / 200	▼1	Opposition
1930	113,318	10.03	20 / 200	▼3	Coalition
1933	115,433	10.42	21 / 200	▲1	Coalition
1936	131,440	11.20	21 / 200	Steady	Opposition (1936-1937)
1936	131,440	11.20	21 / 200	Steady	Coalition (1937-1939)
1939	124,720	9.61	18 / 200	▼3	Coalition
1945	134,106	7.90	14 / 200	▼4	Coalition
1948	137,981	7.34	13 / 200	▼1	Opposition (1948-1950)
1948	137,981	7.34	13 / 200	▼1	Coalition (1950-1951)
1951	130,524	7.20	14 / 200	▲1	Coalition
1954	135,768	6.76	12 / 200	▼2	Coalition (1954)
1954	135,768	6.76	12 / 200	▼2	Opposition (1954-1956)
1954	135,768	6.76	12 / 200	▼2	Coalition (1956-1958)
1958	126,365	6.50	13 / 200	▲1	Coalition (1958-1961)
1958	126,365	6.50	13 / 200	▲1	Opposition (1961-1962)
1962	140,689	6.11	13 / 200	Steady	Coalition
1966	134,832	5.69	11 / 200	▼2	Coalition
1970	135,465	5.34	11 / 200	Steady	Coalition
1972	130,407	5.06	9 / 200	▼2	Opposition (1972)
1972	130,407	5.06	9 / 200	▼2	Coalition (1972-1975)
1975	128,211	4.66	9 / 200	Steady	Coalition
1979	122,418	4.23	9 / 200	Steady	Coalition
1983	137,423	4.61	10 / 200	▲1	Coalition
1987	152,597	5.30	12 / 200	▲2	Coalition
1991	149,476	5.48	11 / 200	▼1	Coalition
1995	142,874	5.14	11 / 200	Steady	Coalition
1999	137,330	5.12	11 / 200	Steady	Coalition
2003	128,824	4.61	8 / 200	▼3	Coalition
2007	126,520	4.57	9 / 200	▲1	Coalition
2011	125,785	4.28	9 / 200	Steady	Coalition
2015	144,802	4.88	9 / 200	Steady	Opposition
2019	139,640	4.53	9 / 200	Steady	Coalition
2023	133,318	4.31	9 / 200	Steady	Coalition

=== European Parliament ===
Election	Votes	%	Seats	+/–	EP Group
1996	129,425	5.75 (#6)	1 / 16	New	ELDR
1999	84,153	6.77 (#6)	1 / 16	0	ELDR
2004	94,421	5.70 (#6)	1 / 14	0	ALDE
2009	101,453	6.09 (#6)	1 / 13	0	ALDE
2014	116,747	6.76 (#7)	1 / 13	0	ALDE
2019	116,033	6.34 (#7)	1 / 13	0	RE
2024	112,245	6.14 (#7)	1 / 15	0	RE

=== Presidential elections ===
Election	Candidate	1st round		2nd round		Result
Election	Candidate	Votes	%	Votes	%	Result
1994	Elisabeth Rehn	702,211	22.0 (#2)	1,476,294	46.1 (#2)	Lost
2000	Elisabeth Rehn	241,877	7.9 (#4)			Lost
2006	Henrik Lax	48,703	1.6 (#7)			Lost
2012	Eva Biaudet	82,598	2.7 (#7)			Lost
2018	Nils Torvalds	44,776	1.5 (#8)			Lost
2024	Did not contest					

== Political positions ==
The Swedish language is one of the two official languages of Finland. The SPP has as its main purpose the protection and strengthening of the position of the Swedish language in Finland.

The Swedish People's Party of Finland has the most eclectic profile of any of the political parties in Finland. Its members and supporters chiefly include:

- Fishermen and farmers from the Swedish-speaking coastal areas.
- Small-town dwellers from the adjacent Swedish-speaking and bilingual towns.
- A significant part of the Swedish-speaking population of Finland.
- Left-leaning middle class people.
- Liberals in general, who currently have no representation of their own in the Parliament of Finland, and who as such benefit from the predominantly liberal values of the SPP.

Although the SPP represents a small minority of Finland, having Swedish as a mother tongue is not much of a political handicap in and of itself. Several times, Swedish speaking presidential candidates have gathered considerable support, although not necessarily as candidates for the Swedish People's Party of Finland:

- In 1944, the Swedish-Finnish Carl G. E. Mannerheim, a hero of Finnish independence, became Finland's 6th president.
- In 1956, the Swedish-speaking Social Democrat Karl-August Fagerholm got one less electoral vote than needed to be elected, leading to the election of Agrarian Urho Kekkonen.
- In 1994, the SPP's candidate Elisabeth Rehn was defeated by the Social Democrat candidate Martti Ahtisaari, also with a narrow margin (53.9% to 46.1%).
- In 2024, the NCP's candidate Alexander Stubb was elected as the 13th president of Finland.

The SPP supported Finland's accession bid to NATO.

== List of party leaders ==
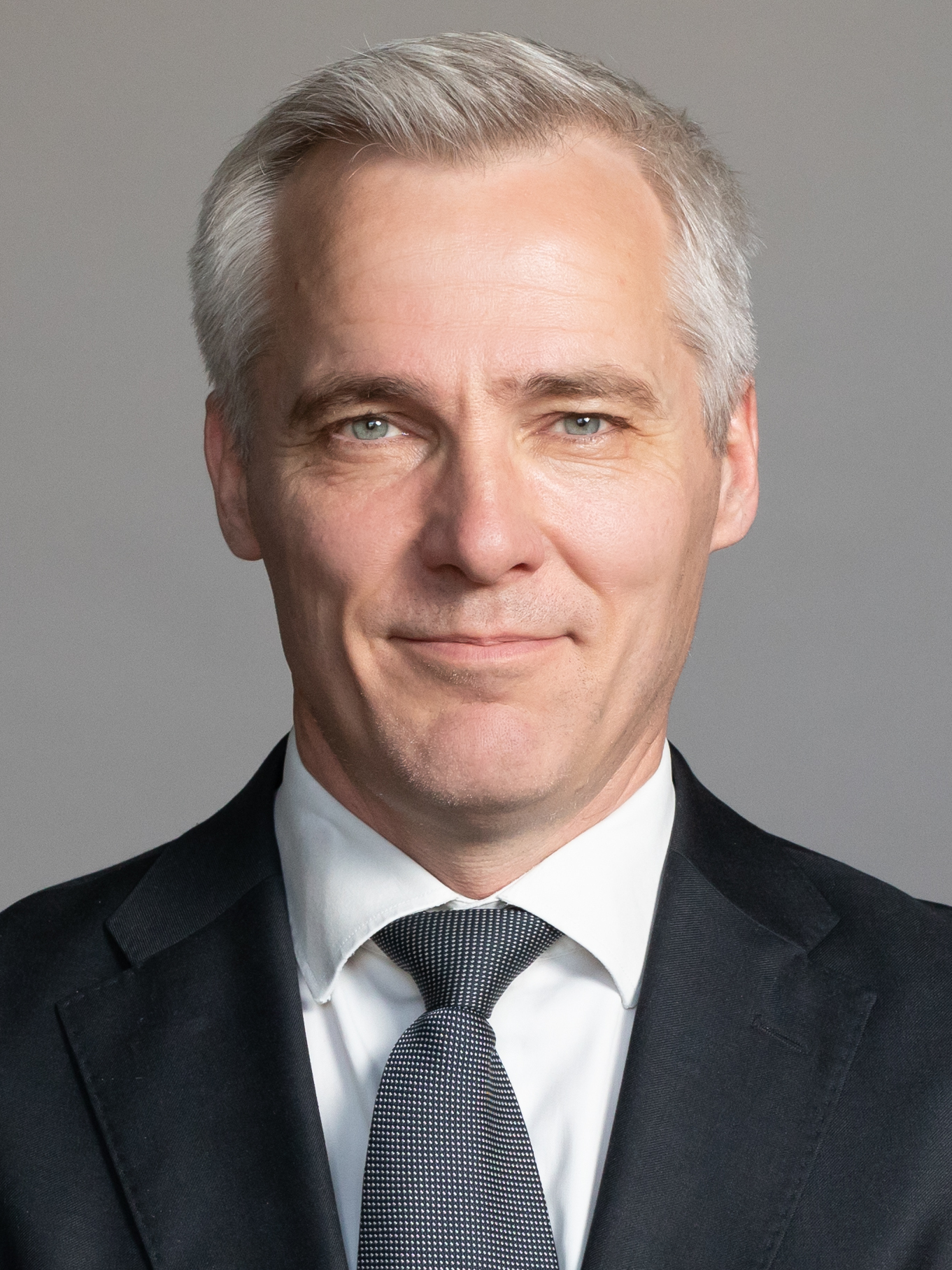
The current party chairperson, Anders Adlercreutz.

- Axel Lille (1906–1917)
- Eric von Rettig (1917–1934)
- Ernst von Born (1934–1945)
- Ralf Törngren (1945–1955)
- Ernst von Born (1955–1956)
- Lars Erik Taxell (1956–1966)
- Jan-Magnus Jansson (1966–1973)
- Kristian Gestrin (1973–1974)
- Carl Olof Tallgren (1974–1977)
- Pär Stenbäck (1977–1985)
- Christoffer Taxell (1985–1990)
- Ole Norrback (1990–1998)
- Jan-Erik Enestam (1998–2006)
- Stefan Wallin (2006–2012)
- Carl Haglund (2012–2016)
- Anna-Maja Henriksson (2016–2024)
- Anders Adlercreutz (2024–present)

== See also ==
1960 municipal elections poster: "Choose Swedish".

- Liberal parties by country
- Liberal democracy
- Liberalism and centrism in Finland
- Finland's language strife
- Swedish Assembly of Finland
- Svecoman movement
- Fennoman movement
- Rolf Witting
- Axel Olof Freudenthal
