= Axel Olof Freudenthal =

Finnish philologist (1836–1911)

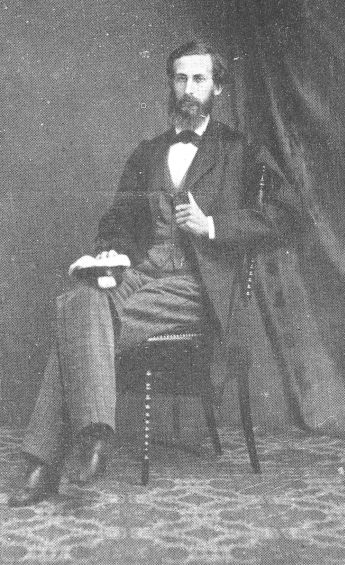
- Born: 12 December 1836; Siuntio, Grand Duchy of Finland
- Died: 2 June 1911 (aged 74); Helsinki, Grand Duchy of Finland
- Occupations: Philologist, professor
- Employer: University of Helsinki
- Known for: Founder of the Swedish nationality movement in Finland

Axel Olof Freudenthal (12 December 1836 – 2 June 1911) was a Finland-Swedish philologist and the first Professor of Swedish language and literature at the University of Helsinki, a position he held from 1878 to 1904. He is considered the founder of the Swedish nationality movement in Finland, which arose in the late 1850s as a reaction against the growing Fennoman movement. Freudenthal was also among the founders of the Society of Swedish Literature in Finland and the Swedish People's School Association.

== Early life and education ==
Freudenthal was born in Siuntio (Sjundeå), Grand Duchy of Finland, to parents who had moved from Sweden, and grew up at Pickala manor in Sjundeå. His family was partly of German descent. His father Gabriel Freudenthal had previously worked as a pharmacist in Åbo, and after his death in 1845 the family moved to Helsinki, where Freudenthal attended the Helsingfors lyceum and passed his matriculation examination in 1854. He then enrolled at the University of Helsinki, graduating with a bachelor's degree in 1859 and a master's degree in 1860. In 1886, Freudenthal married the teacher Edla Lovisa Winberg.

== Swedish nationality movement ==
At the University of Helsinki, where the struggle between the Fennomans and the Svecomans was intensifying, Freudenthal became a strong proponent of the Swedish language in Finland, and subsequently developed the theory that the Swedish-speaking population constituted a separate nationality. Against Johan Vilhelm Snellman's Fennoman slogan "One people – one language", Freudenthal advanced his central idea "One people – two languages", arguing that the people of Finland comprised two distinct nationalities, one Finnish and one Swedish.

On 2 May 1858, in a discussion at a student meeting, Freudenthal predicted that Finland would eventually become the fourth independent state of Scandinavia, and that the Swedish-speaking population would then serve as a mediating link between the Scandinavians and the Finns. In contrast to earlier expressions of Swedishness in Finland, which emphasised the role of language, Freudenthal placed greater weight on descent as the foundation of nationality. This theory strongly opposed any form of Finnicization, which it regarded as turning away from Western civilization, and even as a form of Russification.

== Academic career ==
Freudenthal defended his doctoral dissertation on the Old Norse poem Vellekla by Einar Skålaglam in 1865, and was appointed docent in Old Norse language and antiquities in 1866. During the summer of 1860 he undertook, with two companions, a three-month walking tour through all the parishes of Nyland, examining ancient monuments, recording folklore, and collecting rare plants. He repeated the journey the following year and later conducted a similar expedition in the Swedish-speaking parts of Ostrobothnia. These expeditions awakened his interest in the rural Swedish-speaking population and its dialects.

In 1877, Freudenthal was awarded an honorary doctorate by Uppsala University. The proposal to establish a chair in Swedish language — the first of its kind in Finland — met with strong opposition at the Diet in 1872, but was eventually approved. After serving for several years as acting professor, Freudenthal was appointed the first ordinary holder of the chair in 1878, an appointment based on his study Über den Närpesdialect, published the same year. He published Svensk rättskrifningslära (Swedish Orthography) in 1881, a dictionary of Estonian Swedish dialects together with Herman Vendell in 1887, and a study of the Vörå dialect in 1889. He held the professorship until the summer of 1904, when he retired at the age of 67.

== Civic engagement ==
Freudenthal's position within the Nyland Nation student association became increasingly dominant during the 1860s. He was elected its first curator in 1868, a post he held until 1880, when he was made an honorary member; he was later elected the association's inspector.

Freudenthal was among the founders of the Society of Swedish Literature in Finland, serving on its board from 1885 to 1908 and as its vice-chairman from 1885 to 1894. In this context, he represented a more popular, rural form of Swedishness — known as bygdesvenskhet (folk Swedishness) — in contrast to the more elitist kultursvenskhet (cultural Swedishness) represented by the society's first chairman, Carl Gustaf Estlander. He was also a founder of the Swedish People's School Association in 1882 and a member of its directorate.

== Racial theories ==
In its more extreme aspects, Freudenthal's theory of Swedish nationality connected language, nationality and race in a way that claimed supremacy of Swedes over Finns, paralleling other contemporary theories of Aryan supremacy.

== Legacy ==
His life's work was documented by Arvid Mörne in the book Axel Olof Freudenthal och den finlandssvenska nationalitetstanken (1927). In May 1913, the Swedish-speaking students of Nyland erected a memorial on Freudenthal's grave at the Old Lutheran Cemetery in Helsinki. Designed by the architect Birger Brunila, the granite monument takes the form of a bautasten inscribed with an Old Norse dragon design and the words få skola födas bättre än han ("few shall be born better than him").

The Swedish People's Party in Finland considers Freudenthal to be their spiritual father, and it issues an award named after him, the Axel Olof Freudenthal Medal. Many Silver and Bronze medals have been given to individuals since 1937, but only one Gold medal has been issued - to Elisabeth Rehn in 1994. However, the party has not issued the medal since 2007 due to external criticism of Freudenthal's racial views. To date, no Freudenthal Medal recipient has renounced the award.
