= Society of Swedish Literature in Finland =

Scholarly organization

- Abbreviation: SLS
- Formation: 1885
- Type: Learned society
- Headquarters: Kruununhaka, Helsinki, Finland
- President: Henrik Meinander
- Website: www.sls.fi

The Society of Swedish Literature in Finland (Swedish: Svenska litteratursällskapet i Finland r.f.; abbr. SLS) is a scholarly society for the collection, archiving and dissemination of knowledge about Finland-Swedish culture. SLS publishes scholarly literature, maintains archives and libraries, funds research and awards literary and scholarly prizes and scholarships. SLS's activity is made possible by private donations. SLS is one of the largest managers of private charitable funds in Finland.

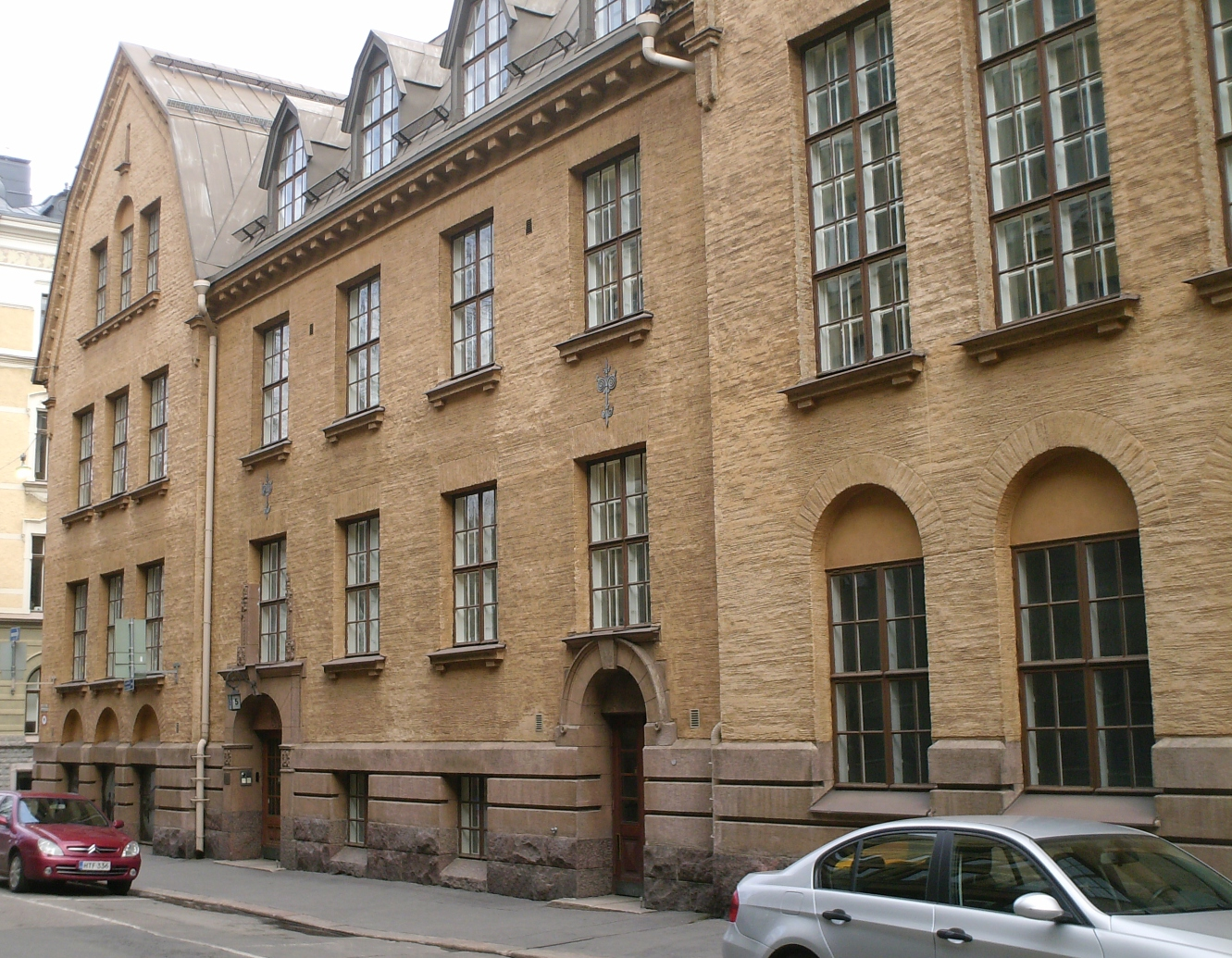
Headquarters of the Society of Swedish Literature in Finland in Helsingfors (Helsinki); the same building also hosts the publisher Schildts & Söderströms; photo: Markus Lång

== Publisher of scholarly literature ==
=== Current major releases ===
- The Biografiskt Lexikon för Finland (Biographical Dictionary of Finland) was published between 2008 and 2011 and contains over 1600 biographies of persons in Finnish history, primarily those connected to Swedish-speaking Finland, as well as content translated from the Finnish-language Suomen kansallisbiografia.
- Zacharias Topelius (1818–1898) was a poet, short story writer, newspaper editor, social activist and professor of history. His extensive writings are a literary monument to nineteenth century Finland. The critical and annotated Zacharias Topelius Skrifter is the first complete edition of his works. It is being published digitally and is freely available. Selected writings will also be issued in print.
