= Länsiviitta =

Finnish shopping centre

Coordinates: 60°09′46.1″N 24°46′33.8″E

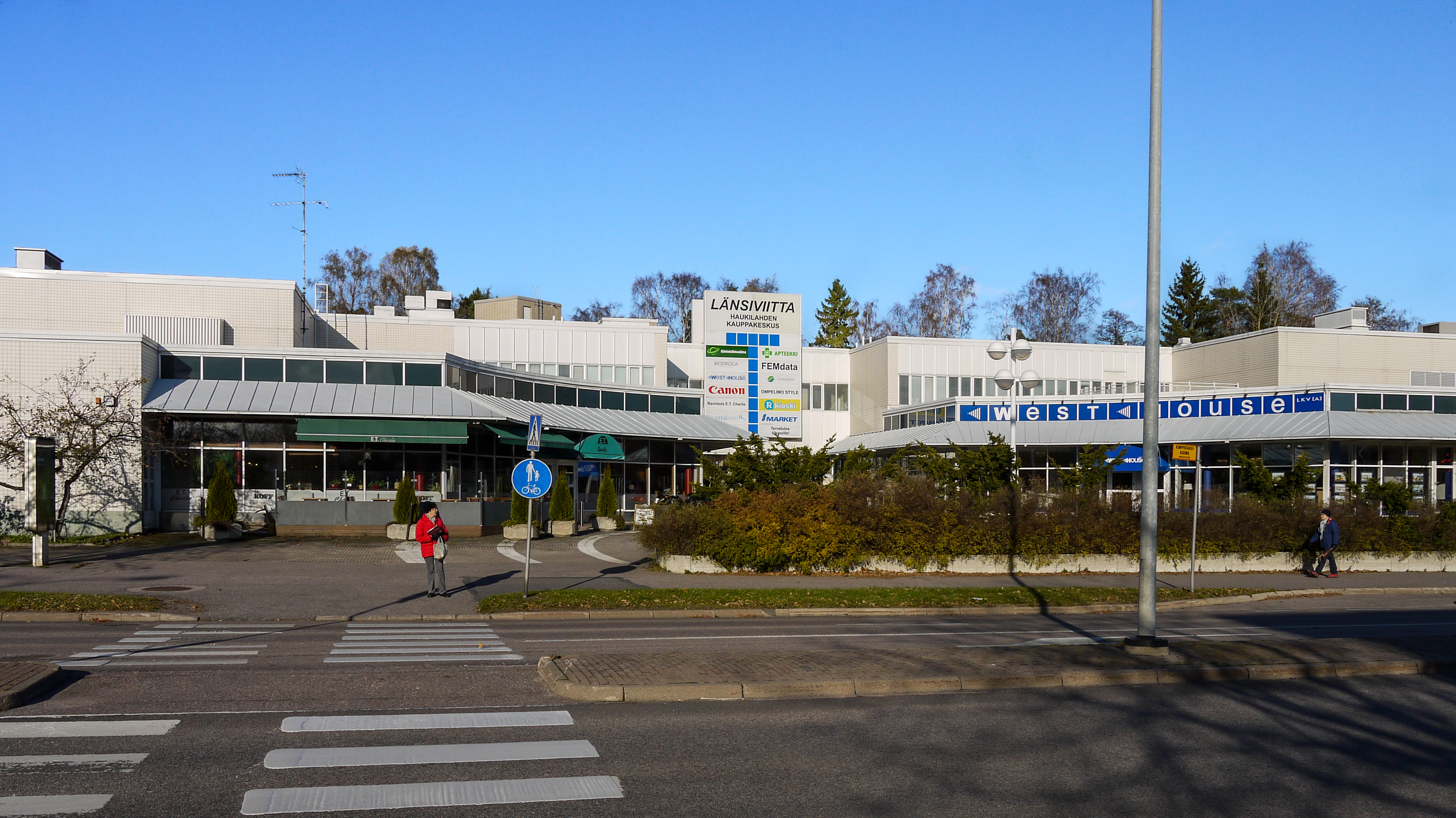
The Länsiviitta shopping centre.

Länsiviitta (Finnish for "west cardinal mark") is a shopping centre in Haukilahti, Espoo, Finland. The shopping centre was opened in 1990, replacing the SPAR and Alepa grocery stores that formerly stood at the site.

The Länsiviitta shopping centre is in two separate parts forming a symmetrical whole. The main entrance way to the shopping centre is from between the parts, with separate entrance to the western and eastern buildings.

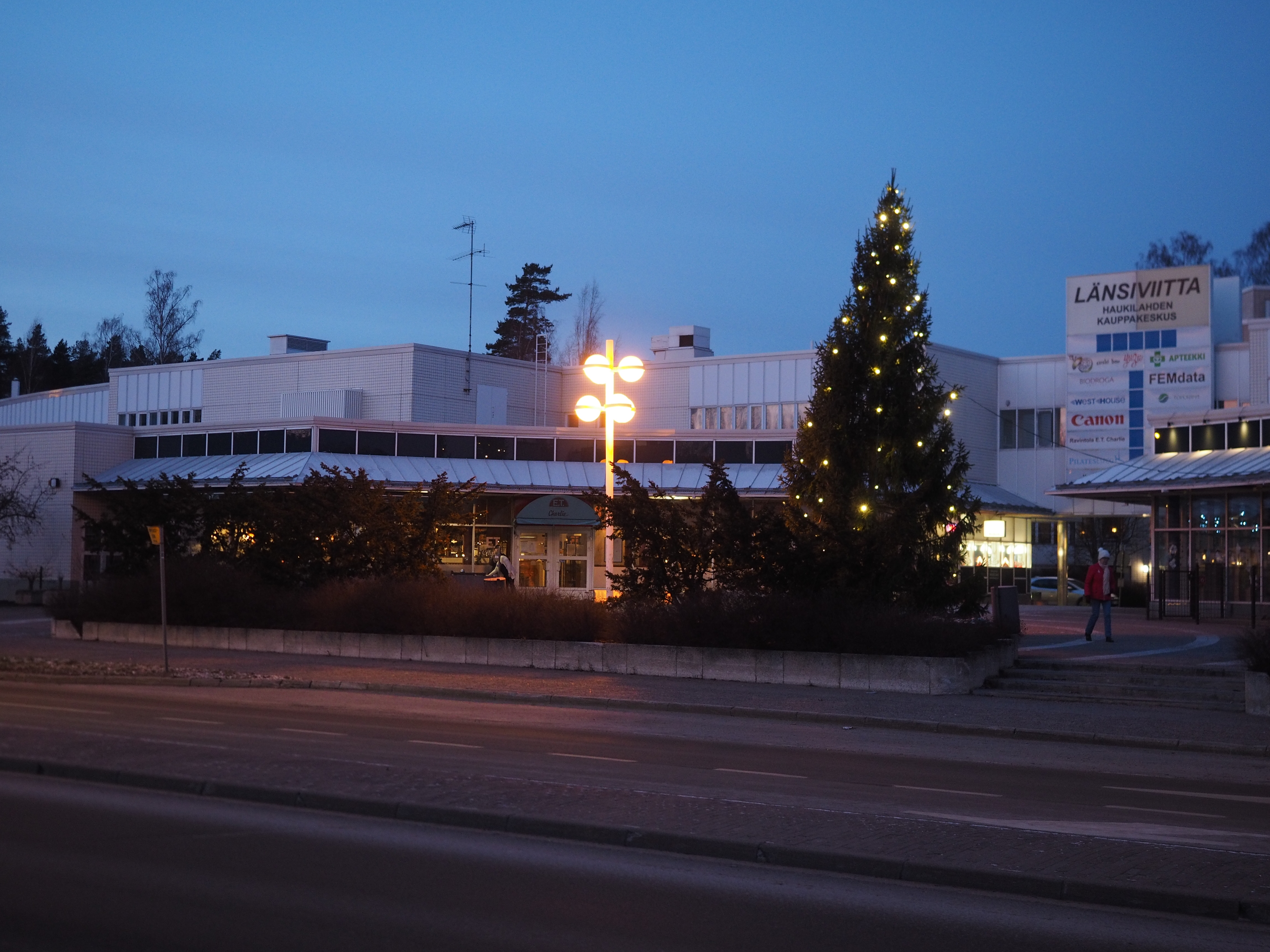
Restaurant E.T. Charlie on a December evening.

The western building hosts an S-market grocery store and restaurants E.T. Charlie and Tokka Pizza. The eastern building hosts a kindergarten.
