= Haukilahti water tower =

Water tower in Espoo, Finland

Coordinates: 60°9′41″N 24°45′54″E

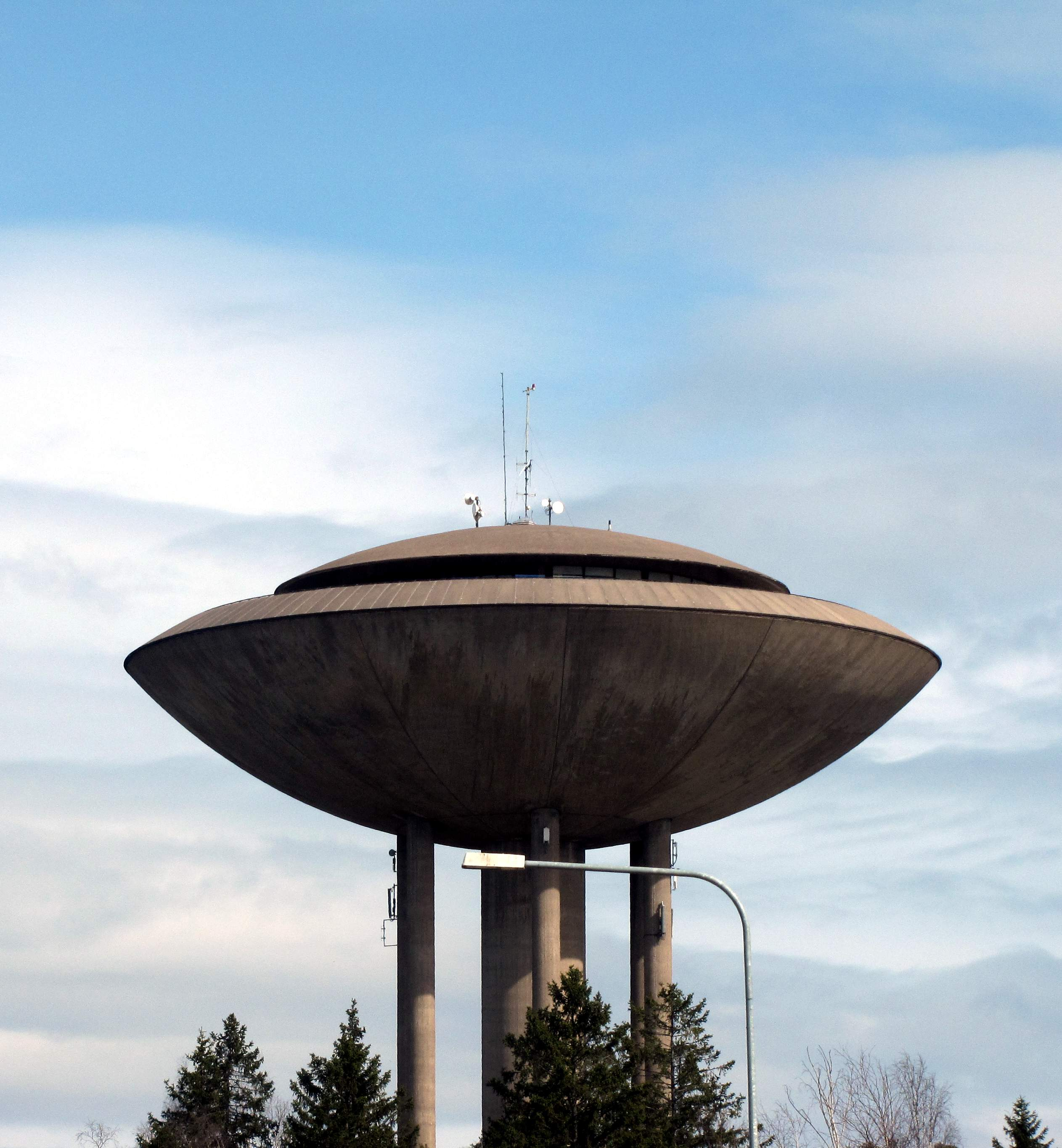
The Haukilahti water tower

The Haukilahti water tower is located in Haukilahti in southern Espoo, Finland. The water tower was built in 1968 and is owned by the Espoo waterworks. The diameter of the tower is 45.3 m and it has two water containers—one inside the other—with a total volume of 4100 m^{3}. The height of the tower is 45.3 m and from sea level 76.3 m.

The tower was designed by architect Erkko Virkkunen and engineer Ilmari Hyppänen.

The top part of the water tower houses a restaurant called Haikaranpesä ("Stork's nest"). A scene of the Finnish film Musta jää was filmed in the restaurant.

The water tower is considered a landmark in southern Espoo. The widow of architect Erkko Virkkunen has said that the futuristic appearance of the water tower was inspired by the animated series The Jetsons. The upper part of the tower resembles a flying saucer. It has also been compared to the Space Needle in Seattle, United States. Construction of the water tower was the first time a technique where concrete elements built on the ground were hydraulically pulled upwards was used in Finland.

== History ==
=== Planning and construction ===
Planning the Haukilahti water tower started in the mid 1960s when construction in southern Espoo was in its most intense growth phase. The tower was designed in conjunction with another water tower in Mäkkylä, which was later cancelled due to planning of the Otaniemi water tower starting. Challenging parts of the design included the concrete spherical cap shaped water containers, whose calculations were done by computer, which was rare in Finland at the time. The capacity of the tower was planned for a community of 40 thousand inhabitants. The council of the Espoo market town accepted the sketches for the tower in April 1966, and the tower would receive the required construction permit despite a construction ban enacted in mid May. A lot of 3360 square metres had been received from the Gäddvik estate for the site of the tower. The final construction permit was achieved in November 1966, and construction started in March 1967.

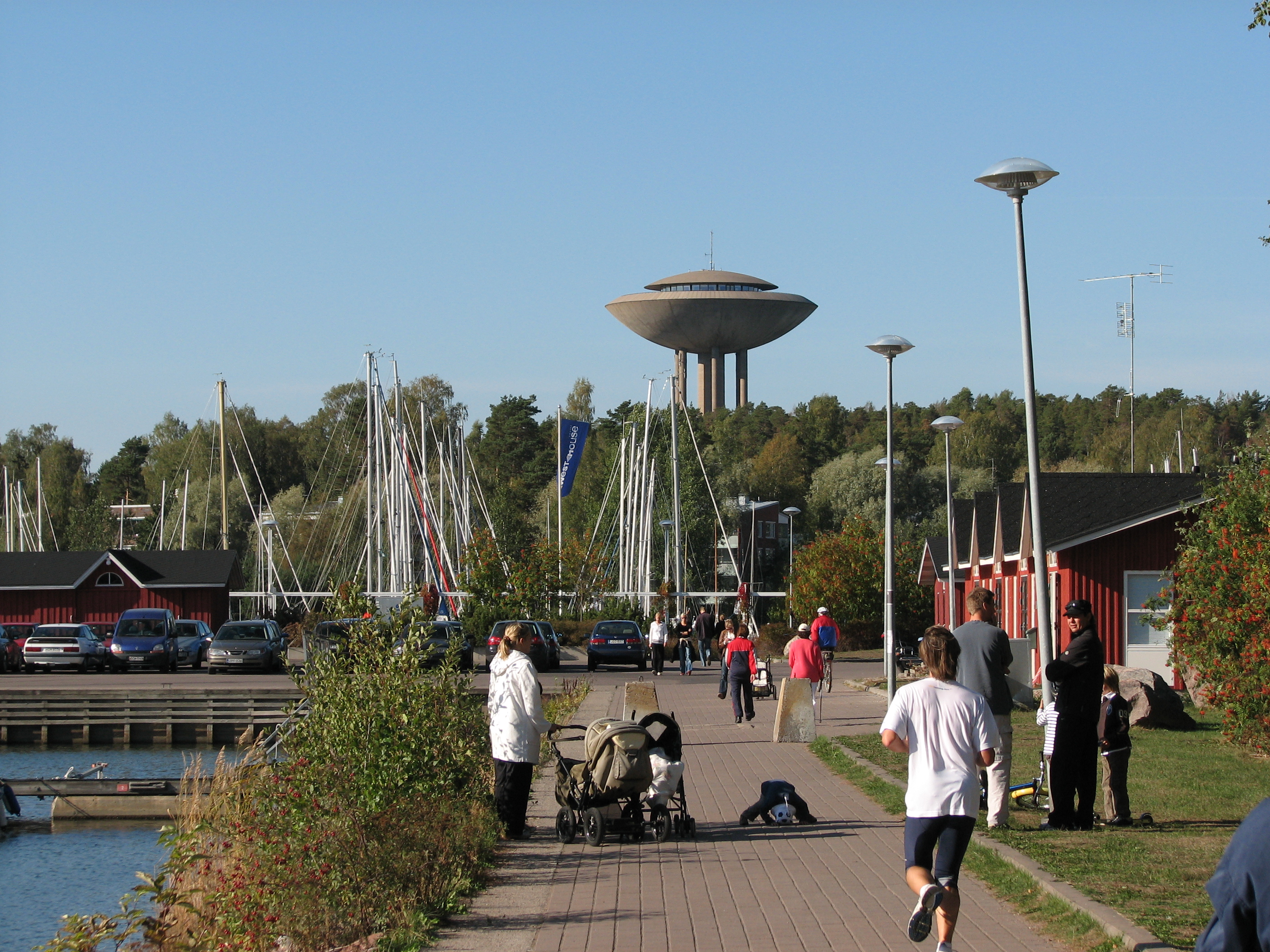
A view of Mellsten harbour, with the Haukilahti water tower in the background

The tower was constructed in an unusual manner where a central pillar 5.7 metres in diameter and six support pillars 1.5 metres in diameter were first cast to their full length, after which the lower caps of the container were cast on the ground and then lifted on top of the pillars with hydraulic lifts. The lower part of the water container consisted of two spherical caps, of which the first had a diameter of 40 metres and weighed 1230 tonnes. The second lower cap, with a diameter of 45 metres was built in the same manner, and it functions as heat insulation and a facade for the container. The chosen manner of construction cut down on the number of scaffolds needed and minimised the work safety risks during construction. The inner cap was a solid concrete construction, whereas the outer cap was a so-called "sandwich" construction, where a foam rubber disc has been inserted between two concrete shells as insulation. The Haukilahti water tower was one of the first buildings in Finland to use foam rubber as insulation on a large scale.

The second lifting phase took place in January, when the cold weather created additional problems. The main construction company in the project, Vesipojat Oy, went bankrupt at the same time, and construction of the tower was first continued by the engineering company Vesi-Pekka Oy, and the work was completed by the construction company Tuomas Savolainen. After the lifting phase a concrete lid was cast onto the tower, on top of which a lookout restaurant with a hundred seats with its own terrace was built. The tower, which had cost almost three million Finnish markka was finally taken into use in September 1968.

=== Use ===
The tower was originally intended to serve the areas of Haukilahti, Westend, Tapiola, Matinkylä, Olari, Niittykumpu and Laajalahti. Once the Otaniemi water tower was completed the area was concentrated more to the southern and western areas. From the 1960s to the early 1980s the incoming water to the tower came from the Bodom and Dämman water sources, but after the Päijänne Water Tunnel was completed in 1982 it became the principal water source for the tower. The overall volume of the water container is 4100 cubic metres, and it consists of two separate containers of 1200 and 2900 cubic metres.

A lookout café or restaurant was planned into the tower since the beginning. A deal was made to rent the top part of the tower for restaurant use with Elanto in September 1968, but nothing became of this plan. The space was rented in March 1969 by the entrepreneur couple Tauno and Lydia Roiha, who managed their restaurant up to the early 2000s, when the ownership of the restaurant passed to a new generation and was taken up by Markku Roiha. Up to 1987 the restaurant held so-called "disco nights", but the restaurant has since profiled itself more as a catering restaurant and a lunch venue for corporate clients.

=== Renovation and current state ===
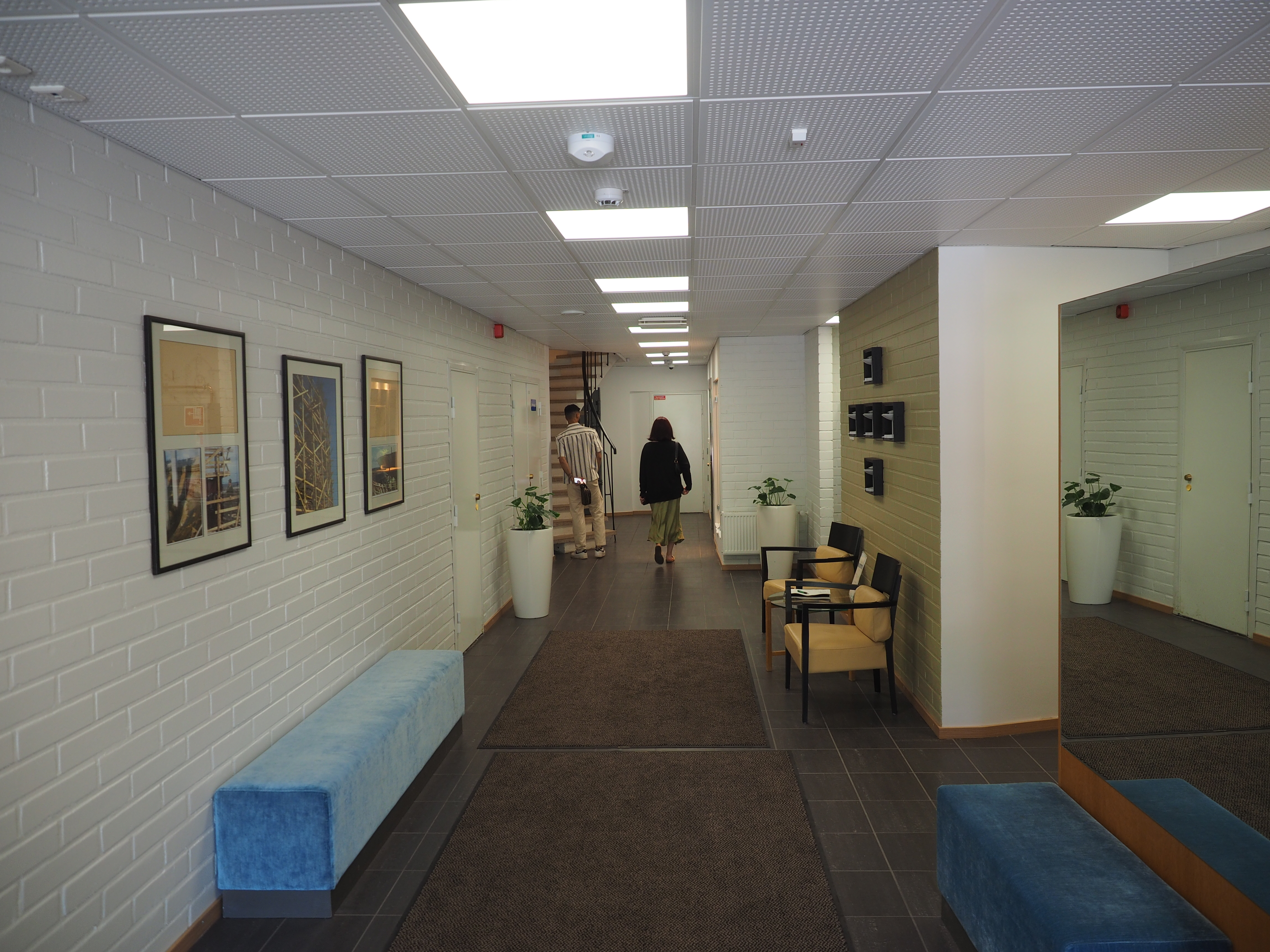
Public access to the water tower is via an elevator that only stops at two floors: the ground floor and at the restaurant at the top of the tower.

Architectural plans for the renovation of the tower were drawn up by architect Pirjo Kovanen just before she retired, since she worked at the Virkkunen architecture bureau during the design of the tower. The structures of the tower were thoroughly examined and a repair estimate was made based on the examination.

Renovation of the tower started in June 2011 and was completed by October 2012. During the renovation, the northern cap was rebuilt as prestressed concrete. The 144 concrete shell elements of the tower were taken down and rebuilt, and the concrete water containers were cleaned and resurfaced. The cost of the renovation was 4.6 million euros. The renovation was done taking care to preserve the history and original structure of the tower under supervision of the Finnish Heritage Agency, as the tower is an architecturally and locally significant building.

The Haukilahti water tower was still seen as a usable and necessary part of the waterworks of Espoo in the 2010s. It served the needs of 70,000 inhabitants in 2013 and is the only water tower in the Helsinki capital region open to the public.
