= Haukilahti =

Haukilahti Gäddvik
- District of Espoo
- Location of Haukilahti within Espoo
- Coordinates: 60.163°N 24.775°E
- Country: Finland
- Municipality: Espoo
- Region: Uusimaa
- Sub-region: Greater Helsinki
- Main District: Suur-Tapiola
- Inner District(s): Haukilahti

Area
  - Total: 3.2 km^{2} (1.2 sq mi)

Population (2015)
  - Total: 5,745
  - Density: 1,800/km^{2} (4,600/sq mi)

Languages
  - Finnish: 80.3 %
  - Swedish: 17.2 %
  - Other: 2.5 %
- Jobs: 860

Haukilahti (Swedish: Gäddvik) is a neighbourhood in Espoo, Finland. It is located on the seashore of the Gulf of Finland in the southern part of the city.

Haukilahti is quiet and has many forested areas and parks. Right across the road from the main residential area is the Toppelund forest, beyond which lies the seashore.

The Finnish name "Haukilahti" and the Swedish name "Gäddvik" both translate to "bay of pikes", referring to the narrow bay at the mouth of the Gräsaån stream.

The modern history of Haukilahti starts from the 16th century, but most of the development to its current state happened in the decades after World War II, when many new detached houses and apartment buildings were built in the area. After the war, Haukilahti grew from a small vacation spot for Helsinkians into a suburb of six thousand inhabitants, which also caused its main income to change from agriculture to services and trade.

== Name ==
The name Haukilahti apparently comes from the Gäddviken bay used for fishing pikes. Earlier spellings of the village include Geddeuik (1540) and Geddewijk (151). The area received the Finnish name Haukilahti in the 1960s. The name pair Haukilahti - Gäddvik has been the official name of the district since 1976.

== Geography ==
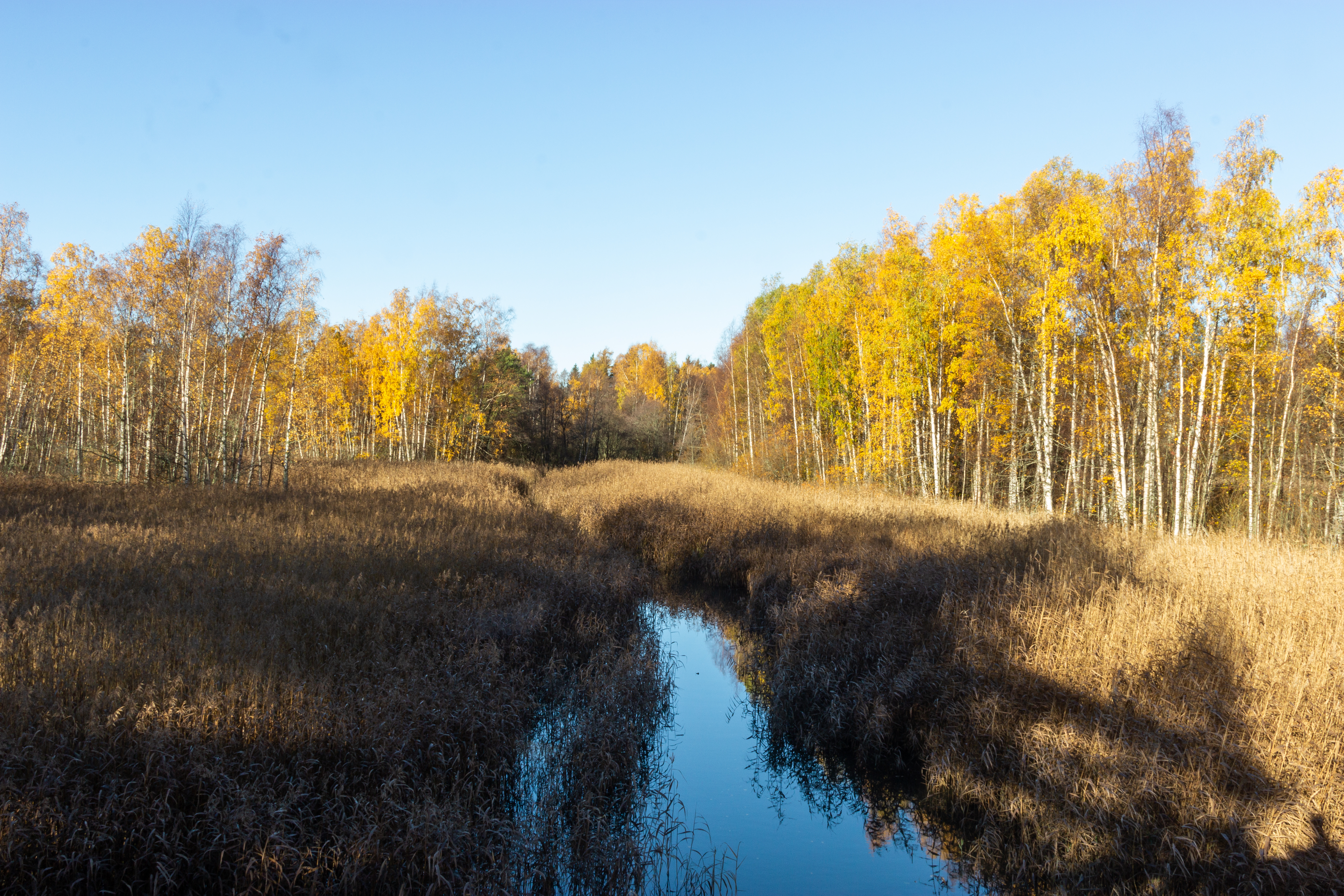
The Gräsanoja stream runs into the Haukilahti boat harbour.

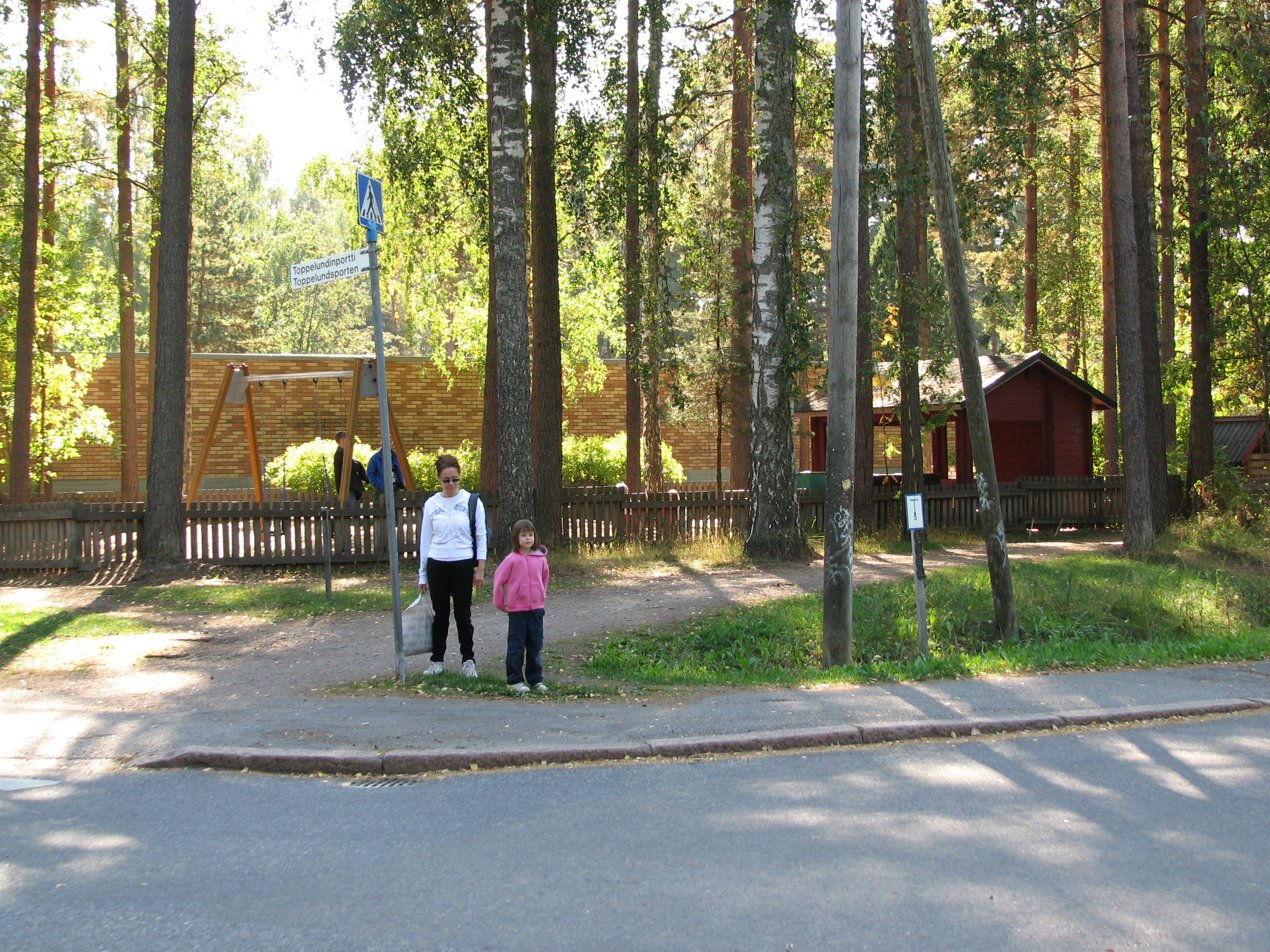
As a mainly residential district, Haukilahti offers many parks and playgrounds.

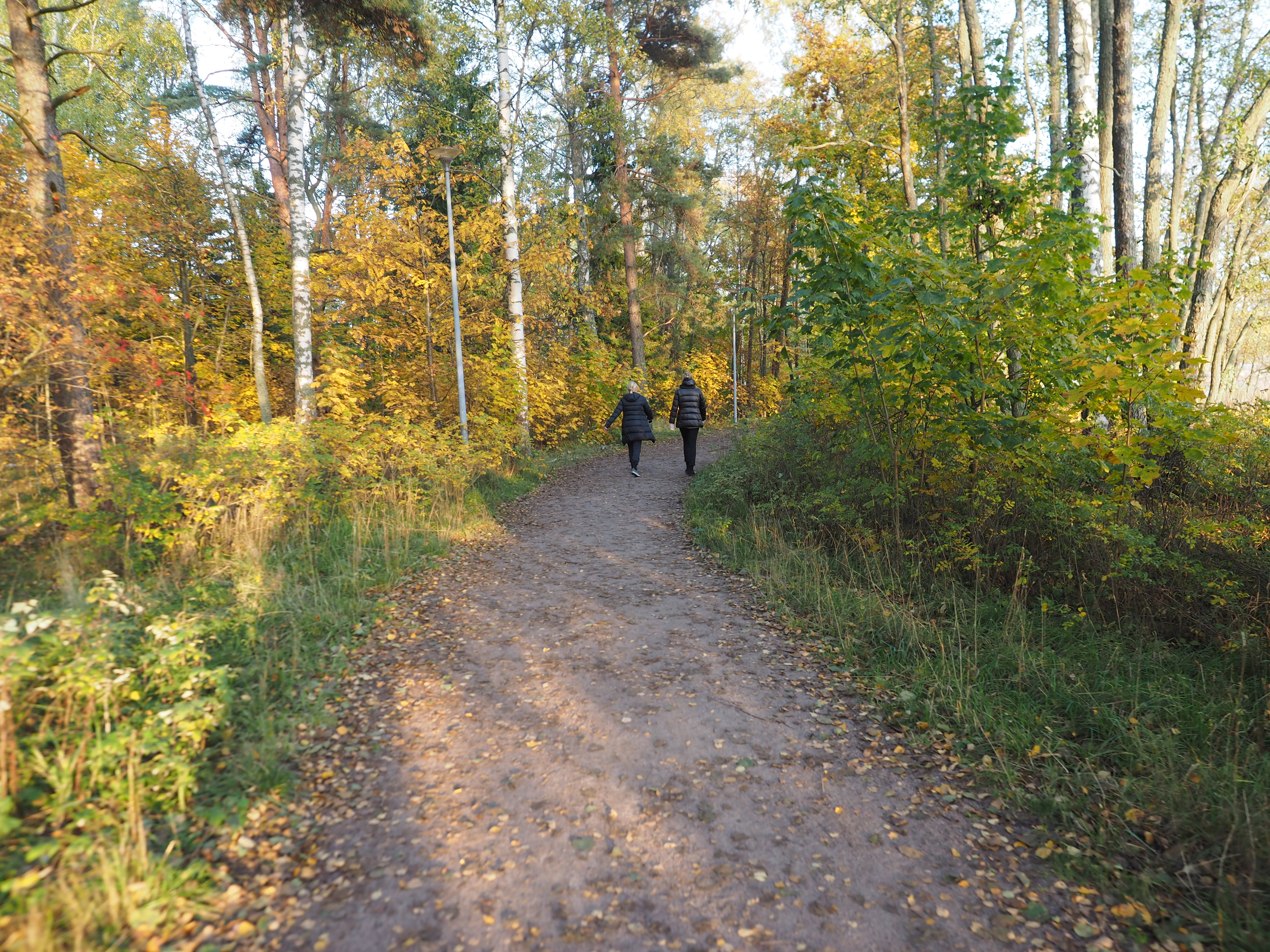
The Toppelund forest is located near the sea shore in Haukilahti.

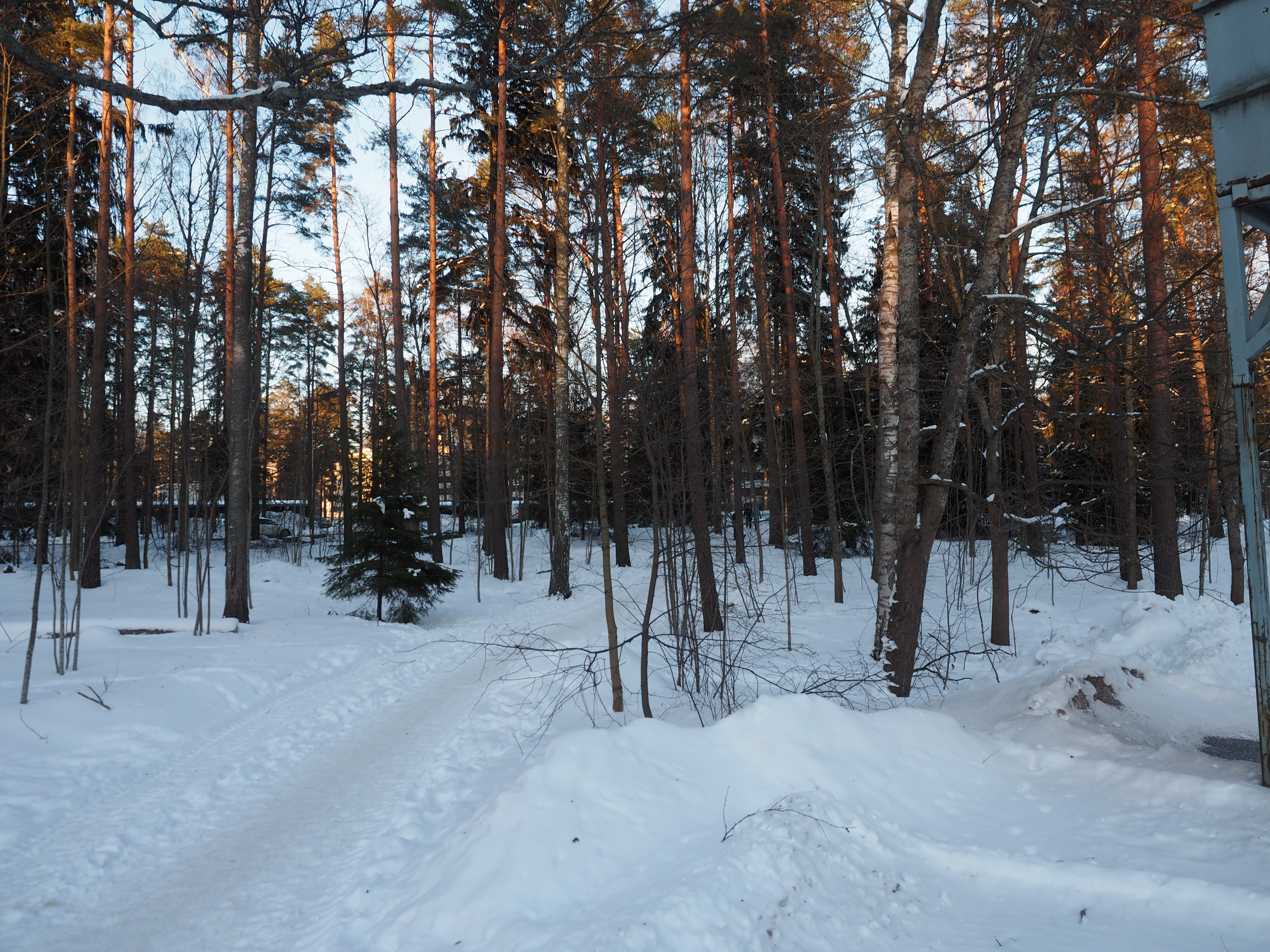
A forest in Haukilahti in winter.

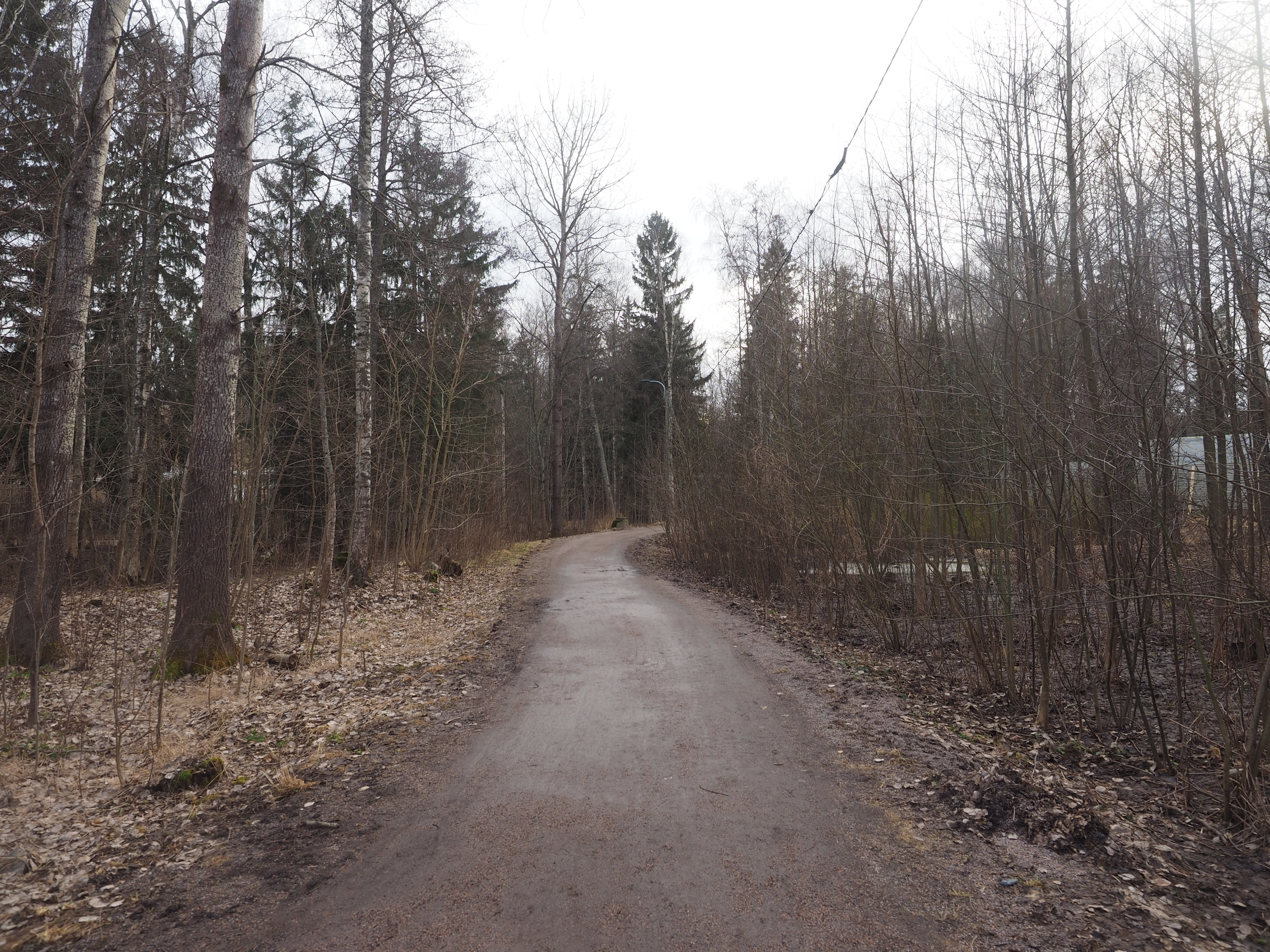
An unpaved street through a forest connects Haukilahti with the neighbouring district of Westend.

The area of Haukilahti is about 3.2 square kilometres. Haukilahti is located between the districts of Westend in the east, Matinkylä in the west and Niittykumpu in the north. To the south of Haukilahti is Miessaarenselkä, part of the Gulf of Finland, which got its name from Miessaari island. The stream Gräsanoja (Gräsaån in Swedish) forms the border between Haukilahti and Matinkylä, and it opens into the Haukilahti harbour.

Haukilahti is surrounded by a line of cliffs 20 to 30 metres high (Hauenkallio, Telamäki, Rajakallio, Pitkänkallio). There are lower areas between these cliffs (5 to 15 metres above sea level). The lowest parts of Haukilahti are located at Telaniitty and Pattistenpuisto, which is a former part of the Haukilahti bay later reclaimed by land. The terrain of the Haukilahti area is nowadays dominated by clay in the lower areas and cliffs in the higher areas, with a thin layer of plant litter covering some of them.

Buildings in Haukilahti are a mixture of apartment blocks and lower houses: detached and row houses. The apartment blocks are by roads Mellstenin rantatie and Haukilahdenkatu, on hills Pitkänkallionmäki and Hauenkallionmäki and near border to Westend. In 2012, there were 2854 homes in Haukilahti, 54 of which were built before 1960, majority or 1386 during 1960–1969, 673 in 1970-1979 and roughly 680 after 1979.

The apartment buildings in Haukilahti are located west of the boat harbour on Mellstenin rantatie, on the highest spots of Pitkänkallionmäki and Hauenkallionmäki, and along Haukilahdenkatu and the border to Westend. There are terraced houses on the northern part of the former Toppelund manor area, on the Telamäki and Pattistenpuisto areas and around Pitkänkallionmäki. The business buildings in the area are along Haukilahdenkatu.

== History ==
=== First inhabitants ===
The first signs of human habitation in Haukilahti are the Bronze Age graves on the Hauenkallio cliff near the Haukilahti water tower. At the time Haukilahti was an island with cliffs and swamps. The village of Gäddvik was first mentioned in a geography book from 1544, where it was marked as belonging to the medieval socken of Espoo, Finnoviken. Gäddvik is missing from the books from 1560 to 1756, when Estonian peasants moved into the area. A 1774 map representing the lands of the Gräsa manor shows six croft houses in the Haukilahti area.

=== From Russian rule to before World War II ===
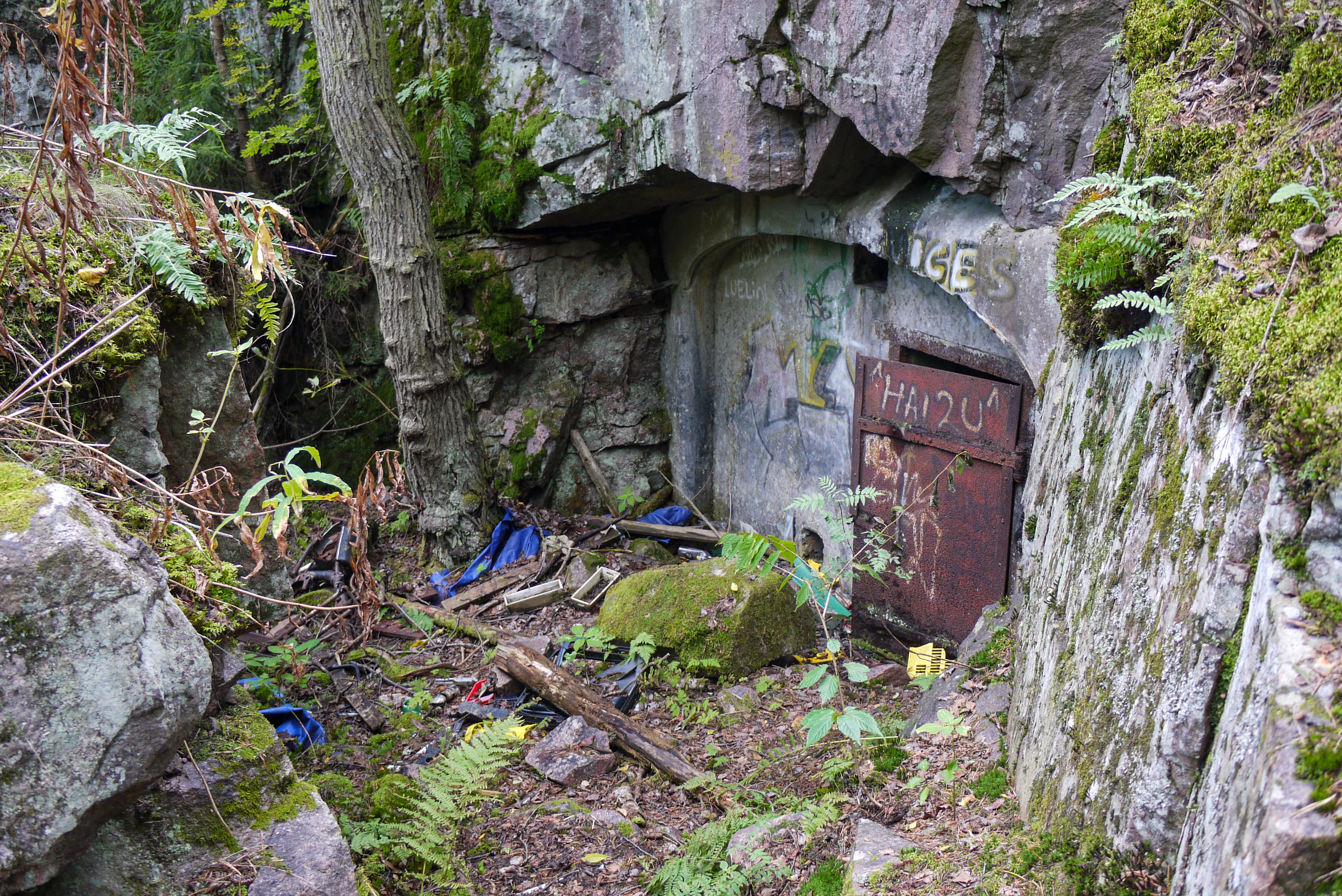
Entrance to base XXXIV of Krepost Sveaborg near Länsiväylä, later used as a landfill.

Wealthy Helsinkians started to found villas in Haukilahti in the late 19th century. 29 lots were separated from the lands of the Gräsa manor by 1917. This lot plan, completed in 1924, is still visible in the local zoning plan.

The military outpost XXXIV (34) of Krepost Sveaborg built by Imperial Russia is also located in Toppelundinpuisto in Haukilahti. Fortifying the outpost started during World War I in spring 1916. The outpost was never used in battle, and the fortifications remain partly incomplete as the Russians withdrew from Finland after Finnish independence in spring 1918.

Development of Haukilahti stayed slower than that of the rest of Espoo for a long time, as there were no fast connections to there from Helsinki or from elsewhere in Espoo. Up to the 1930s Haukilahti could only be accessed by ship, but the situation changed when the Finnish state decided to build the Jorvaksentie highway (now known as Länsiväylä) in 1932 to combat unemployment in areas west of Helsinki. The new highway made the trip to Helsinki significantly shorter and hastened the development of the area.

=== World War II ===
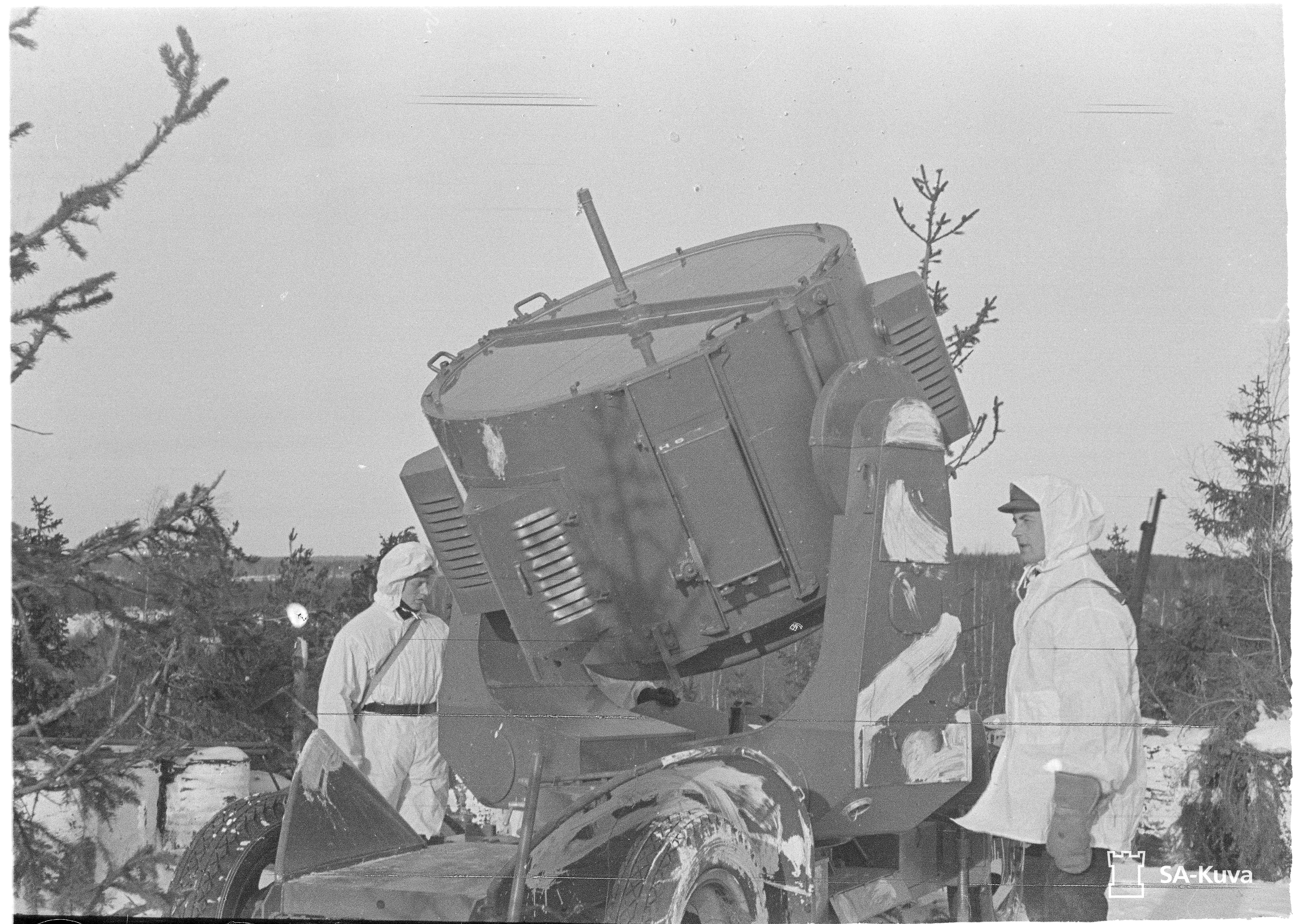
A Strömberg searchlight on top of the Pitkänkallionmäki hill in Haukilahti in February 1940.

During the Winter War, a lighting battery division of the Helsinki anti-aircraft troops was based in Haukilahti, with the intention to light up Soviet bombers invading Helsinki during the dark. The division started operations on 13 October 1939 when it had received its equipment. The Lotta canteen of the division was discontinued after the Moscow Peace Treaty in late March 1940 and the troops were sent home on 5 April. The lighting battery resumed operations at the start of the Continuation War on 12 July 1941 after general mobilisation. The Pitkänkallionmäki battery participated in combating the bombing of Helsinki. Female Lottas were responsible for the battery from late July 1944 until 15 October 1944 when the battery was finally discontinued.

=== After the war ===
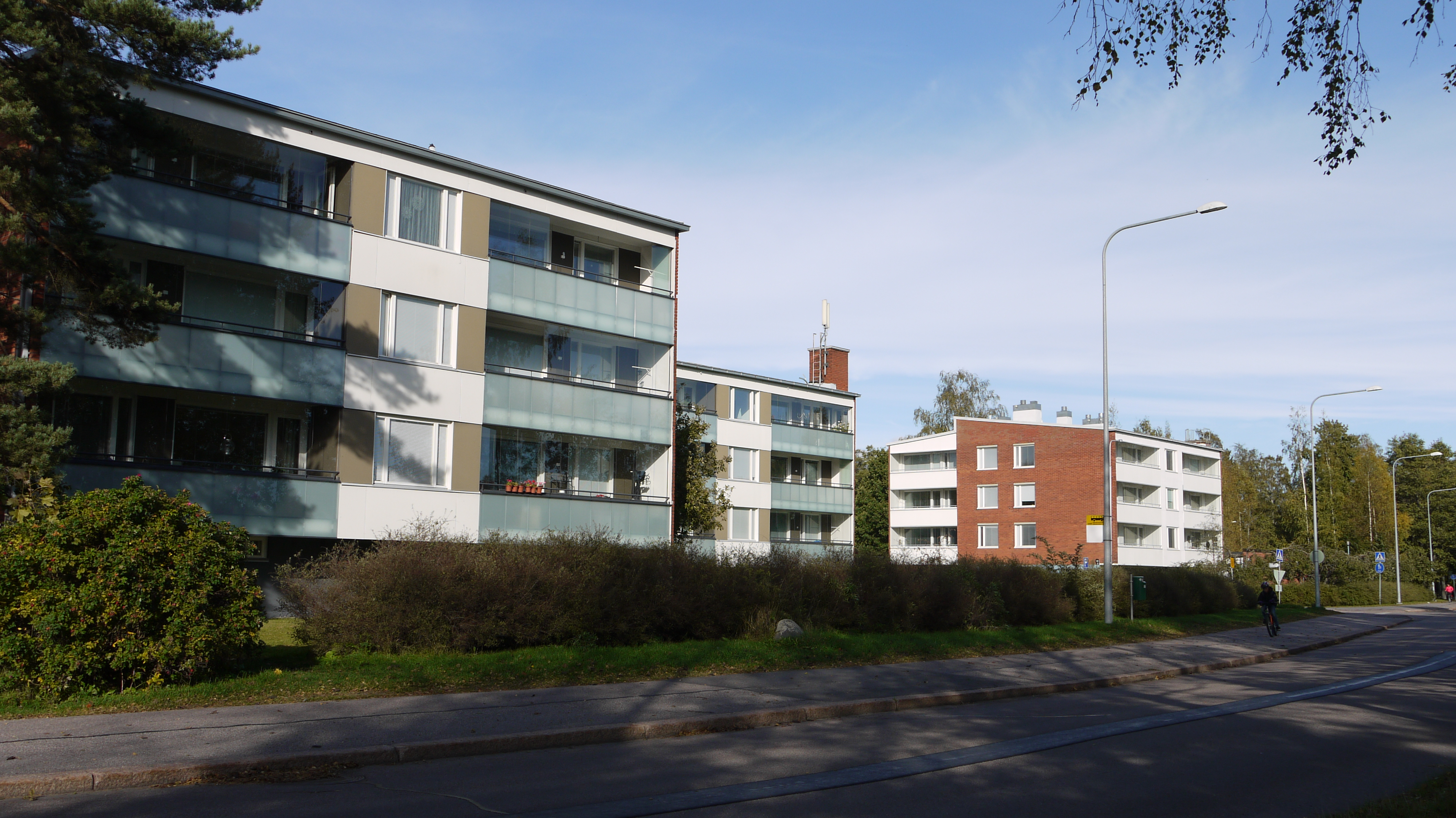
Apartment buildings near the Haukilahti beach built in the 1960s.

Haukilahti got many more detached houses after World War II as evacuees from the Karelian Republic were settled in Finland. Lots from the area now known as Salakkatie were separated for the use of veterans.

Many new buildings were built in Haukilahti by the 1950s as connections to the area improved. The 1957 zoning map shows new detached house areas in northern Haukilahti. The roads in the area were still pretty basic, there were few buildings in southern Haukilahti and use of land was pretty inefficient. There were no apartment or terraced houses. The beaches of Haukilahti were mainly populated with villas. The Uusimaa provincial government decided on a ban on buildings in Haukilahti on 4 May 1950 to be able to create a new zoning plan. Some buildings were still being built with exception permits.

In the 1960s population increased along Jorvaksentie. Still in the early 1960s there was a farm, a fishing installation and villas near the beach, and Jorvaksentie was the only connection from Haukilahti to Westend. Construction of the area happened in the 1960s at the pace of one terraced house per year. Construction in the area increased when Espoo became a market town in 1963. The municipal zoning monopoly was born in Espoo in 1966 when zoning rights were transferred from the provincial government to the municipality. Because of this, all areas in Espoo got a functional zoning plan and a sketch for the plan in Haukilahti was made in January 1964. Construction during the zoning plan continued with exception permits. Many of the roads had already been marked at their present locations in the sketch.

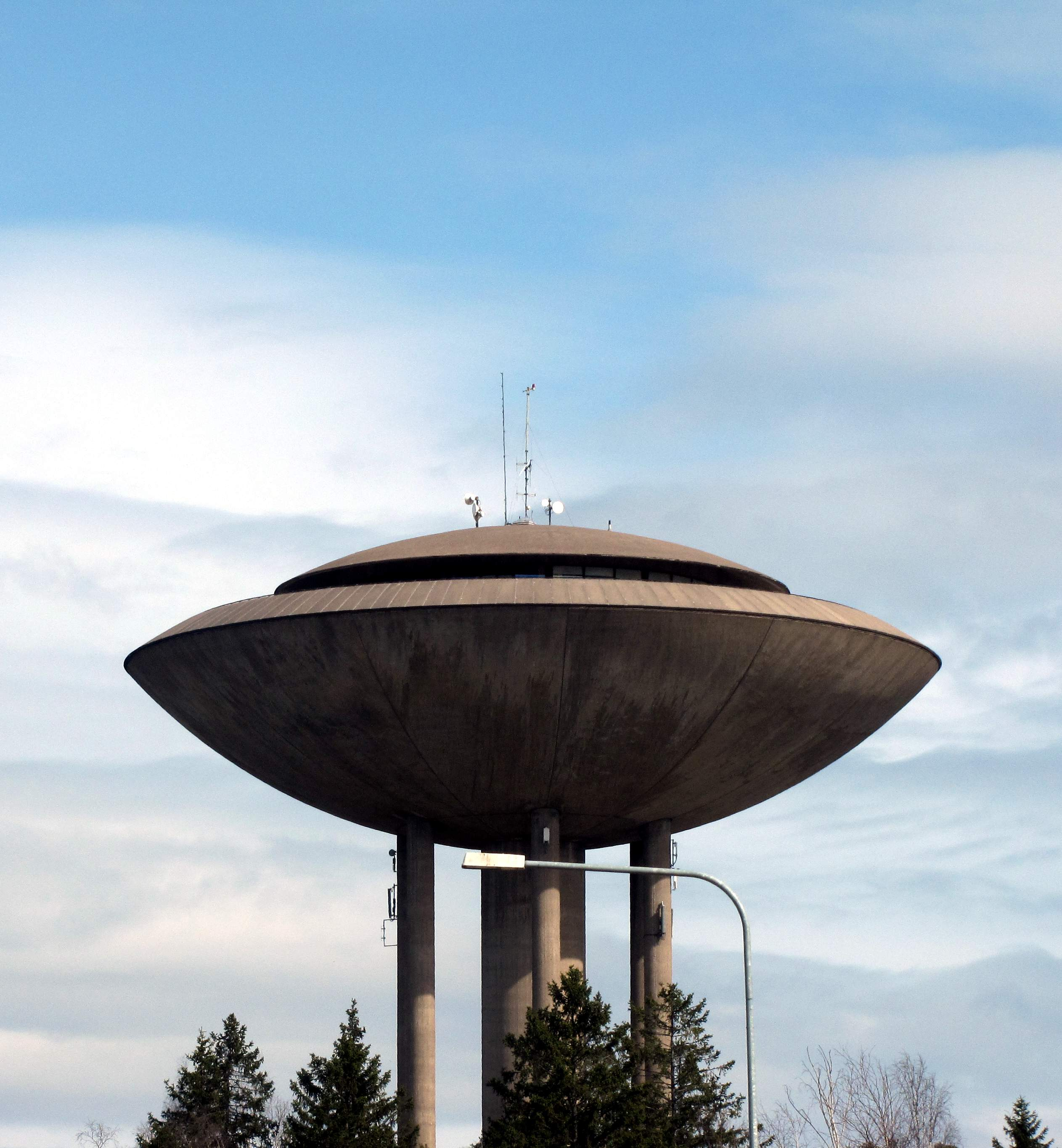
The Haukilahti water tower, with its distinctive water container resembling a flying saucer, was taken into use in September 1968.

Construction was at its fastest from 1963 to 1967. Buildings in the area increased 30-fold during the 1960s and Haukilahti got 1300 new apartments. Many of the new buildings were apartment buildings and terraced houses. The Haukilahti water tower, now a landmark of the area, was taken into use in September 1968. Architects designing buildings in Haukilahti included Matti Aaltonen, Jaakko Laapotti and Toivo Korhonen.

=== From the 1970s to today ===
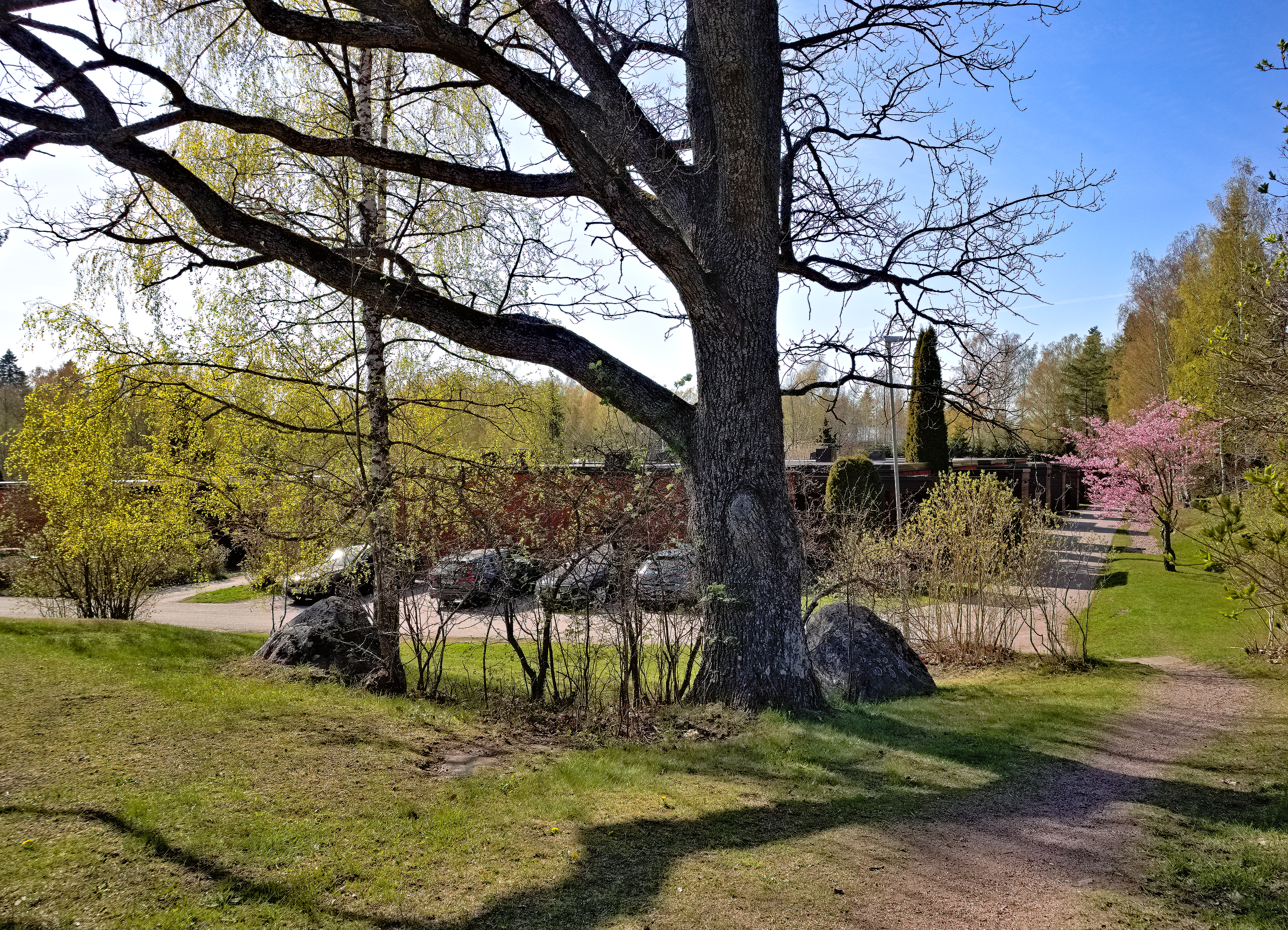
Most of Haukilahti consists of low detached houses.

The central areas in Haukilahti had already been built by the 1970s. The first zoning plan of the area came into force on 6 May 1974 when the Ministry of the Interior approved it. The plan mostly enforced the situation of the construction that had already been completed. The same 1974 zoning plan was mostly still in force in the 2000s in the Haukilahti area; changes have been mostly so-called "postage stamp zoning plans" consisting of one or two lots. Construction slowed down, and there were only 674 new apartments in the 1970s and 411 in the 1980s. The Toppelund school, the Simpukka all-activity centre, the Haukilahti library and kindergarten were built on the northern end of the former Toppelund lot.

The depression during the early 1990s and lack of planned construction ground depleted building new apartments, and there were only half as many apartments built in the 1990s than in the 1980s. The shopping centre Länsiviitta and the Toppelund kindergarten near the sea shore were built in the 1990s. There were less than 100 new buildings in the 2000s, which was mostly due to depletion of planned ground.

There was no significant increase in constructing new buildings in Haukilahti in the 2010s, as the intention was to build only 32 new residential buildings in the area during the next decade. The city of Espoo made a new zoning plan in May 2016 for a new residential area on the Mellstenintie side edge of the Toppelundinpuisto park. The plan was materialised smaller than planned, with the area within construction rights being about half of what was planned.

== Services ==
In 2013 there were about 1037 jobs in the Haukilahti area. The biggest employers were healthcare and social services (144 jobs), wholesale and retail sales (175 jobs) and professional, scientific and technical activity (116 jobs).

=== Education, youth and senior services ===
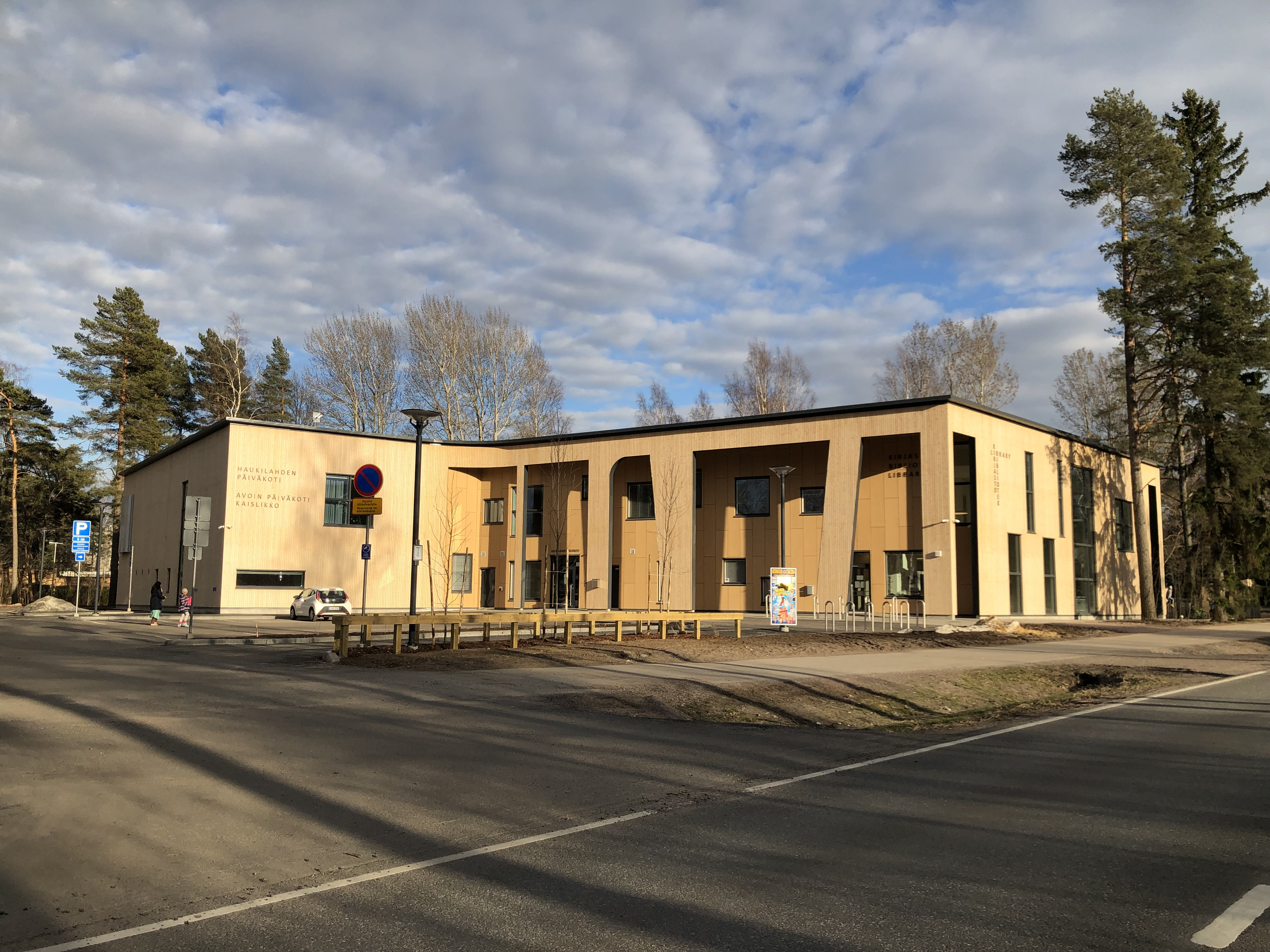
The new building of the kindergarten and library in Haukilahti.

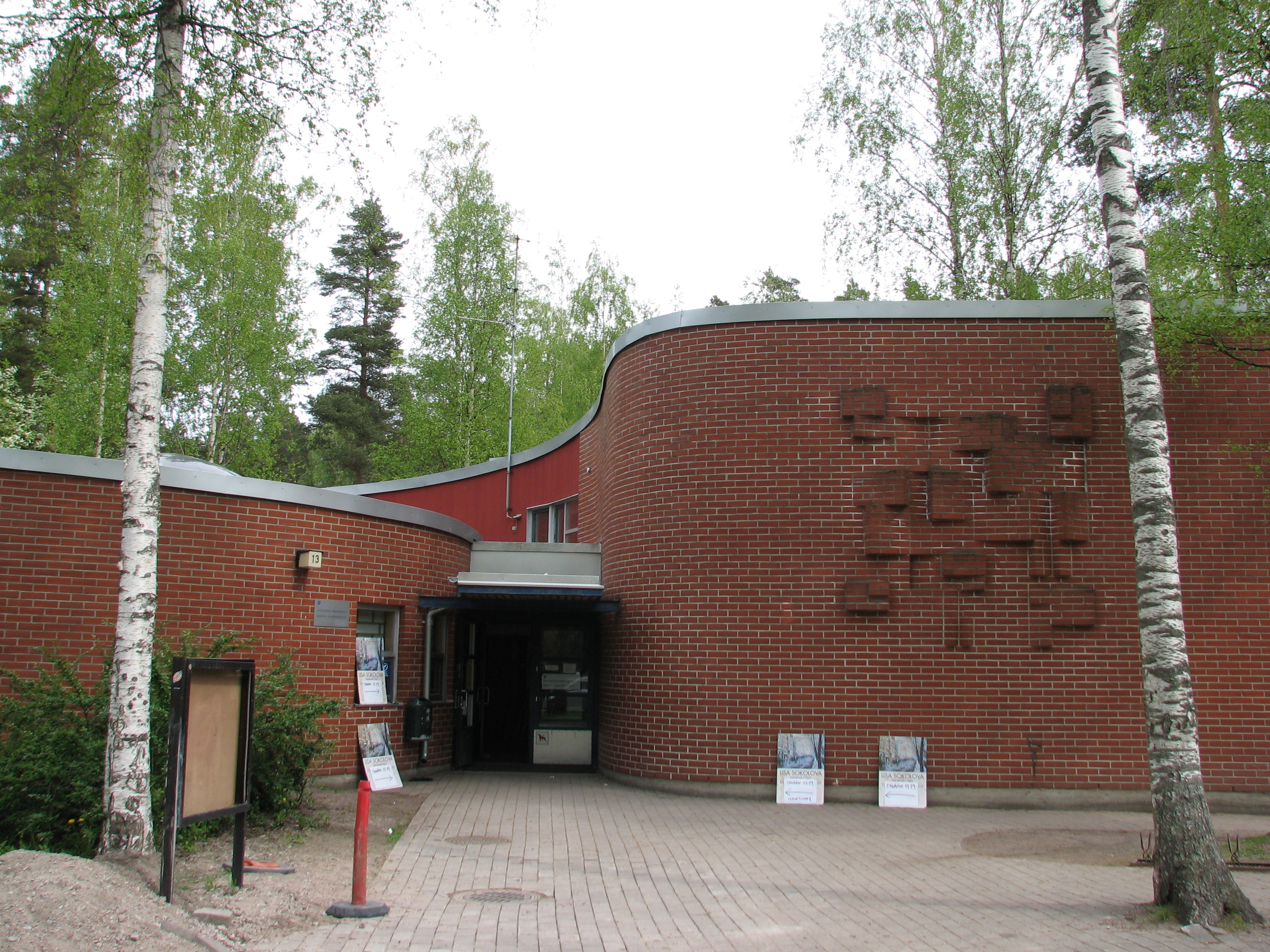
Simpukka ("clam", named after its shape) is a youth and cultural house in Haukilahti.

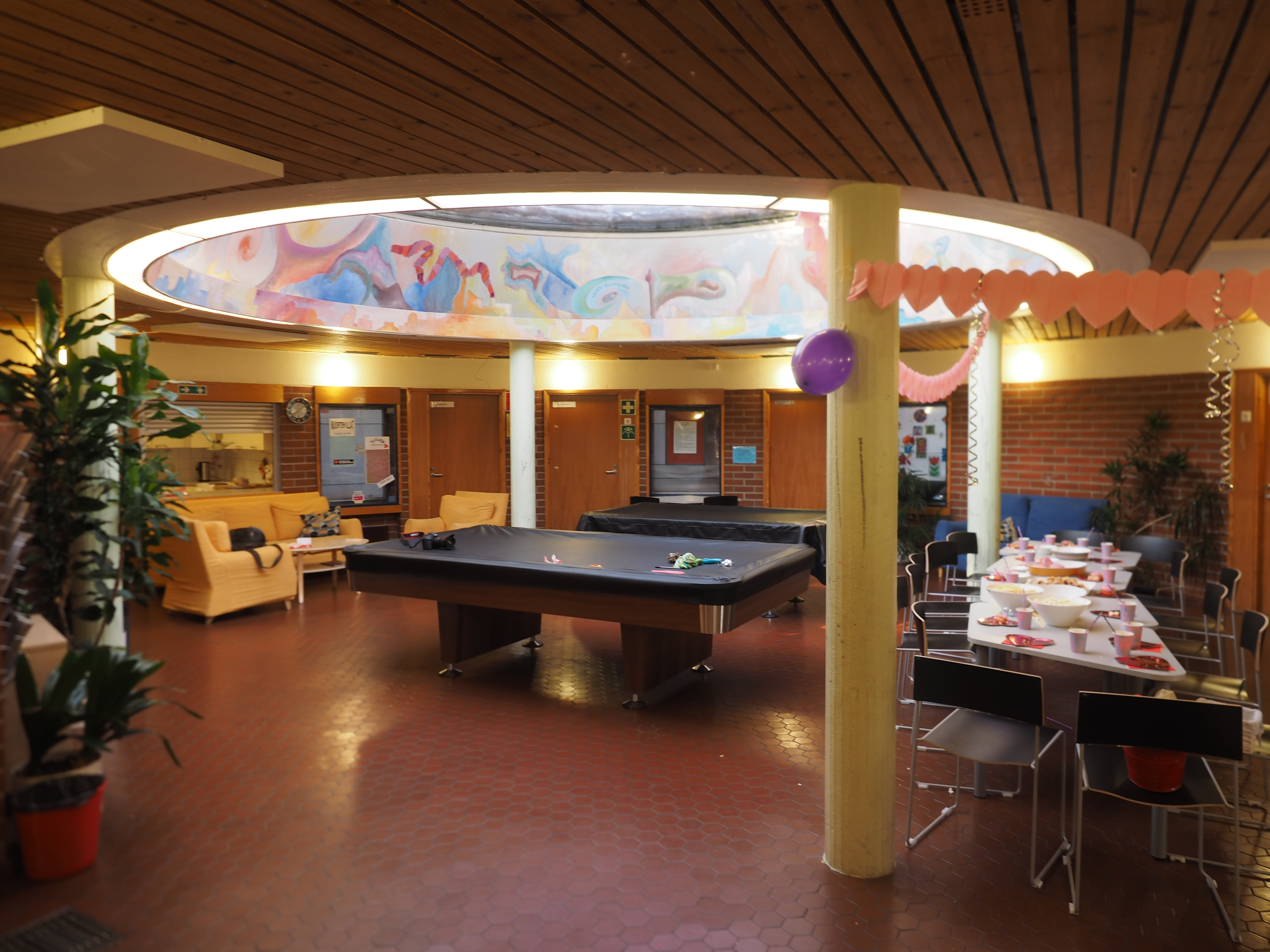
Interior of the Simpukka cultural house.

Haukilahti has two Finnish-language kindergartens run by the city of Espoo (Haukilahti and Toppelund kindergartens) as well as a private Swedish-language kindergarten founded in 1990, with a service contract with the city of Espoo. The original building of the Haukilahti kindergarten was dismantled in autumn 2017 because of mildew problems, and a new two-story kindergarten was built in its place. The new premises increased the number of places for children to 147. A French-language kindergarten was founded in Haukilahti in 1995, but it later moved to Kruununhaka in the neighbouring city of Helsinki.

There have been two primary schools in Haukilahti, the Toppelund School founded in 1985 and the Haukilahti School. The Haukilahti gymnasium used to be in the same premises as the Haukilahti school, but it moved to the Aalto University campus in Otaniemi in autumn 2016, keeping its original name.

The Haukitalo building, maintained by the city of Espoo, is located in the centre of Haukilahti near the Länsiviitta shopping centre. The building serves as a meeting place for senior citizens in the area. Activities organised for senior citizens in Haukitalo include various exercise and wellness activities. Haukitalo also has a municipal dentistry clinic, and the building has been used for public education in Espoo. The building also hosts a lunch restaurant.

Between the primary school and the kindergarten is a red-brick building whose spiralling shape resembles a mollusc. The building, popularly called "Simpukka" (Finnish for "clam") mostly serves as an all-activity centre for the youth. Haukilahti also has a library, whose continuation has been up to debate between the library staff and the city of Espoo. The library had been in the same premises as the Toppelund school, but later moved into the same premises as the new kindergarten during New Year between 2018 and 2019. Near Pitkänkallionmäki is a private senior citizens' home Opri and Oleksi maintained by Esperi Care, with 16 inhabitant places.

=== Outdoor exercise ===
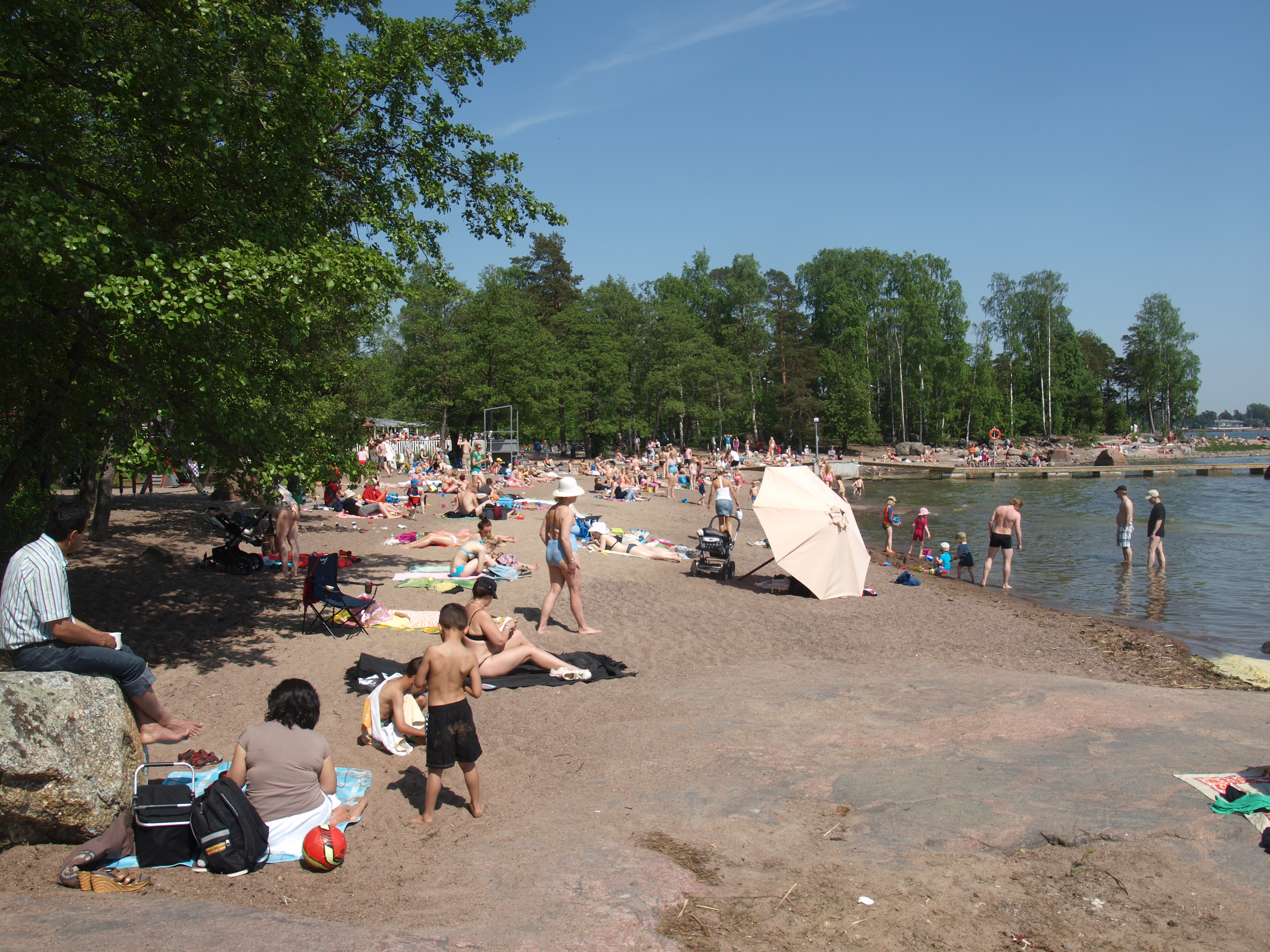
People sunbathing on the Mellsten beach, the larger one of the two beaches in Haukilahti.

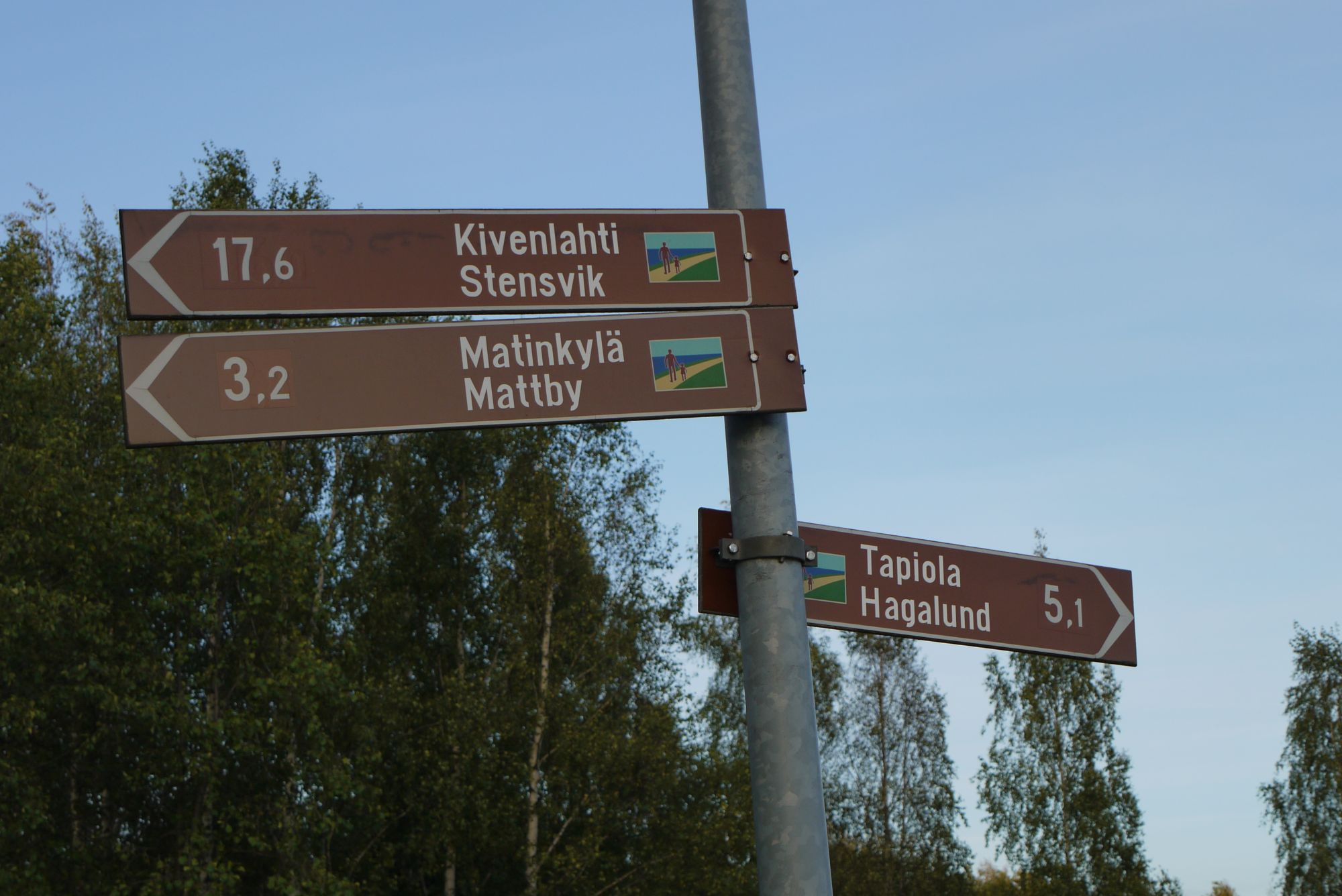
Signs on the Rantaraitti hiking trail at the Haukilahti harbour, pointing to Kivenlahti and Matinkylä in the west and Tapiola in the east.

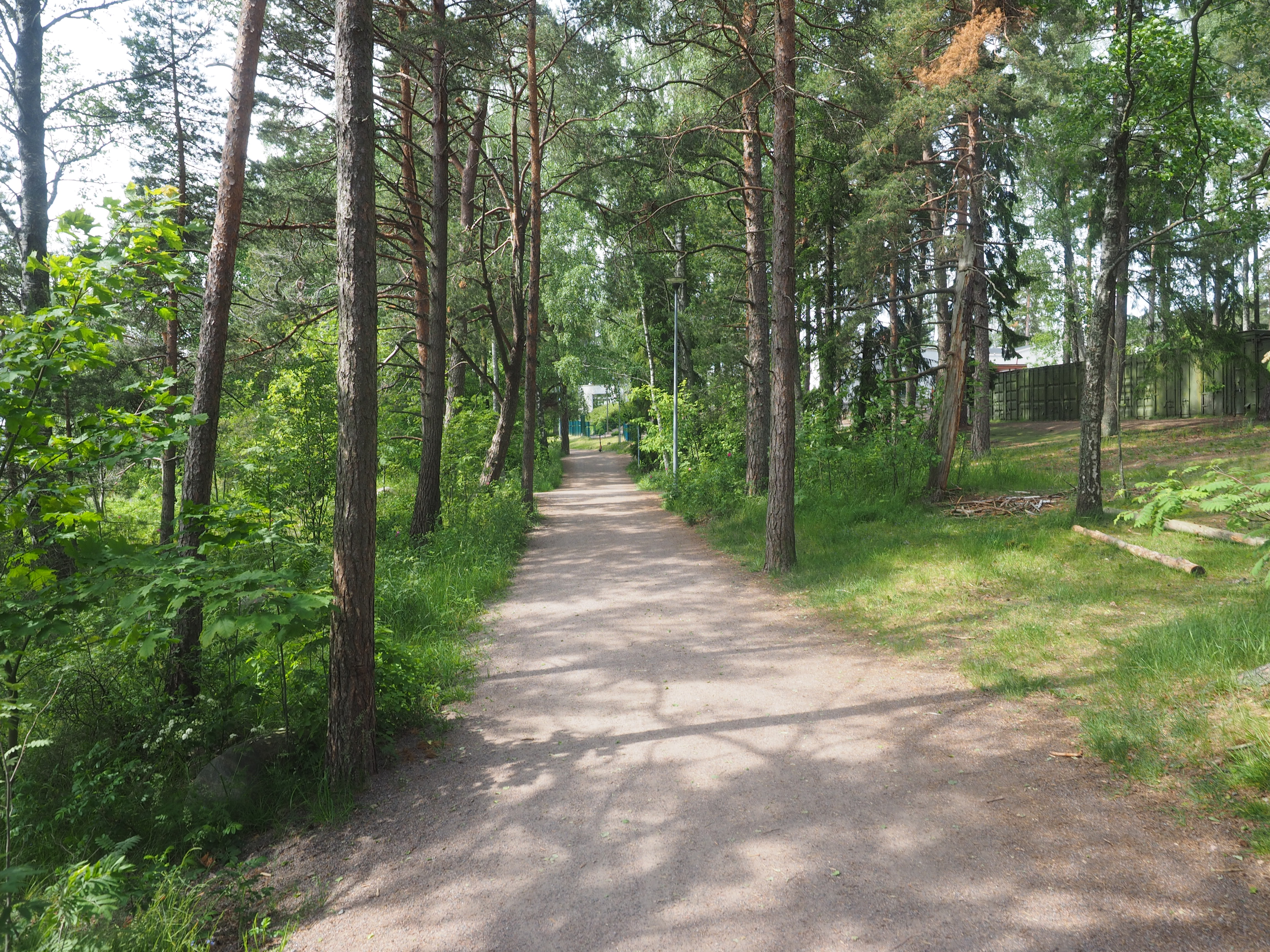
A view of the Rantaraitti hiking trail in June.

The city of Espoo maintains a public hiking trail called Rantaraitti which goes through the Haukilahti coast as well as a running track of 800 metres on Hauenkallio built in the early 1980s.

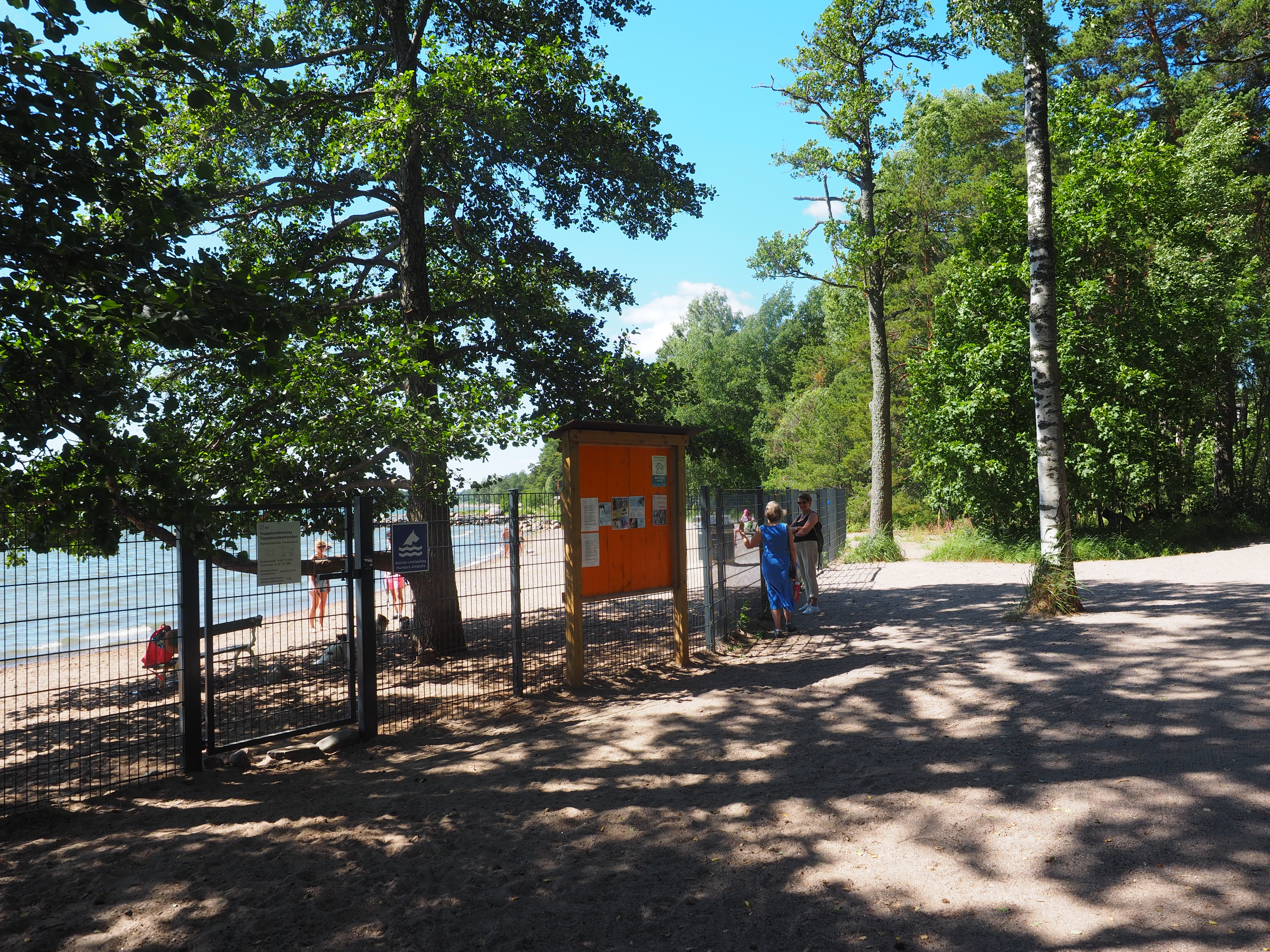
Dogs are allowed to swim in a section of the beach between the Toppelund and Mellsten public beaches.

There are two public beaches in Haukilahti. The eastern beach, in the Toppelund area, is smaller and quieter, and usually only visited by Haukilahtians. The western beach, in the Mellsten area, is larger and more popular. In 2015, readers of local newspaper voted it was the best beach in Espoo. It has been named by students from the Helsinki University of Technology as the best beach for windsurfing in the entire capital area, and has a direct connection to the Mellsten harbour, which is home to 637 boats and four yacht clubs, and includes two seaside cafés. Dogs are allowed to swim in a section of the beach.

There are several different sports fields in Haukilahti. General sports fields include the fields of Pattistenpuisto, the Toppelund school and the Haukilahti school, as well as the Haukilahti field "Sandika" located on an old ground excavation site. These vary in surface materials: Pattistenpuisto has sand and grass fields, whereas the Haukilahti school field and Sandika are sand only. The Toppelund field has an artificial turf surface, which the football club HooGee installed with sponsorship funding in summer 2018. There are basketball fields on the western end of the Toppelund school field, in Pattistenpuisto and on the northern end of Sandika. There is also a sand-surfaced volleyball field in Pattistenpuisto, a beach volleyball field on the Mellsten beach and a petanque field in Lahnapuisto. In winter, the fields of the Toppelund and Haukilahti schools, as well as Sandika, are frozen into skating rinks.

=== Commercial services ===
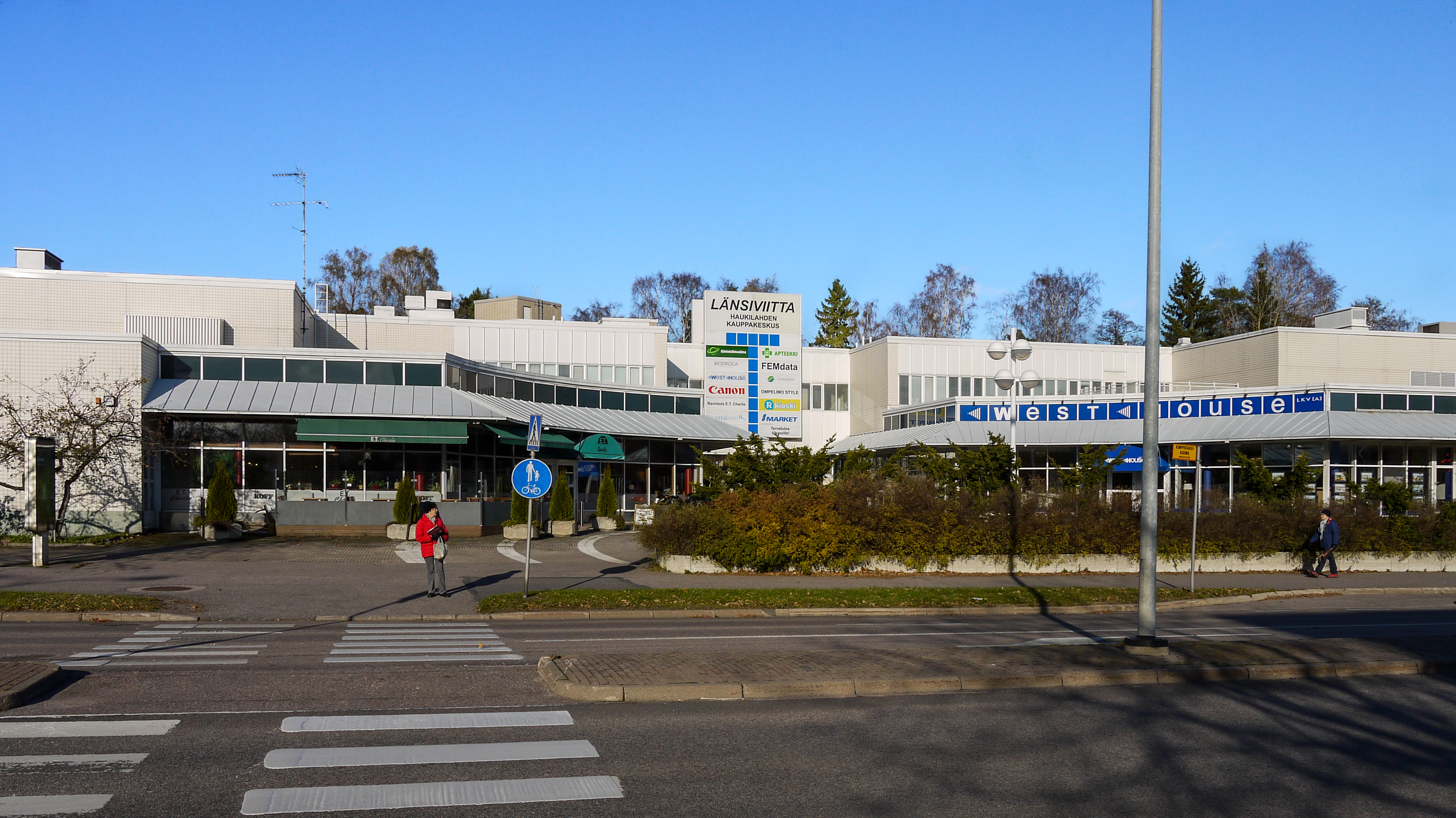
Shopping centre Länsiviitta.

The shopping centre Länsiviitta was opened in Haukilahti in 1990. The shopping centre includes an S-market grocery store at the premises of the former Alepa and Spar stores. To the north of the shopping centre is Haukilahti's old shopping centre, which has hosted a Kotipizza restaurant and restaurant Rioni serving Georgian cuisine.

The grocery store K-Market Sorsakivi was opened in Haukilahti in 1968. There is also a SOL laundry service on the same premises.

At the top of Haukilahti's most prominent landmark, the Haukilahti water tower, at 76 metres above ground, is a panorama restaurant. The 1978 office building near Haukilahdensolmu hosted the office of Norilsk Nickel in 2018. The building also hosted an office of the Talvivaara mining company before the company went bankrupt in 2018. The building is nowadays known as the AHTI Business Park and has previously served as the head office of the company Datasaab-Valmet.

=== Haukilahti Society ===
The local association of Haukilahti, the Haukilahti Society (Finnish: Haukilahden Seura, Swedish: Gäddvikssällskapet) was founded between 1964 and 1965, when the district was changing from a small villa resort to a residential suburb. The society was active up to the 1970s but as key persons died activity waned for several years. Activity was resurrected by the early 1980s, and the society has organised various kinds of activity in the area, such as public events and inhabitant activity. It has also given scholarships to nearby schools, published the Haukilahden Viesti magazine and had an effect on the zoning and construction plans in the area. Nowadays the Haukilahti Society is part of the union of local associations in Espoo and of the Finnish home area union. Membership of the society has ranged from one hundred to two hundred.

=== Religious activity ===
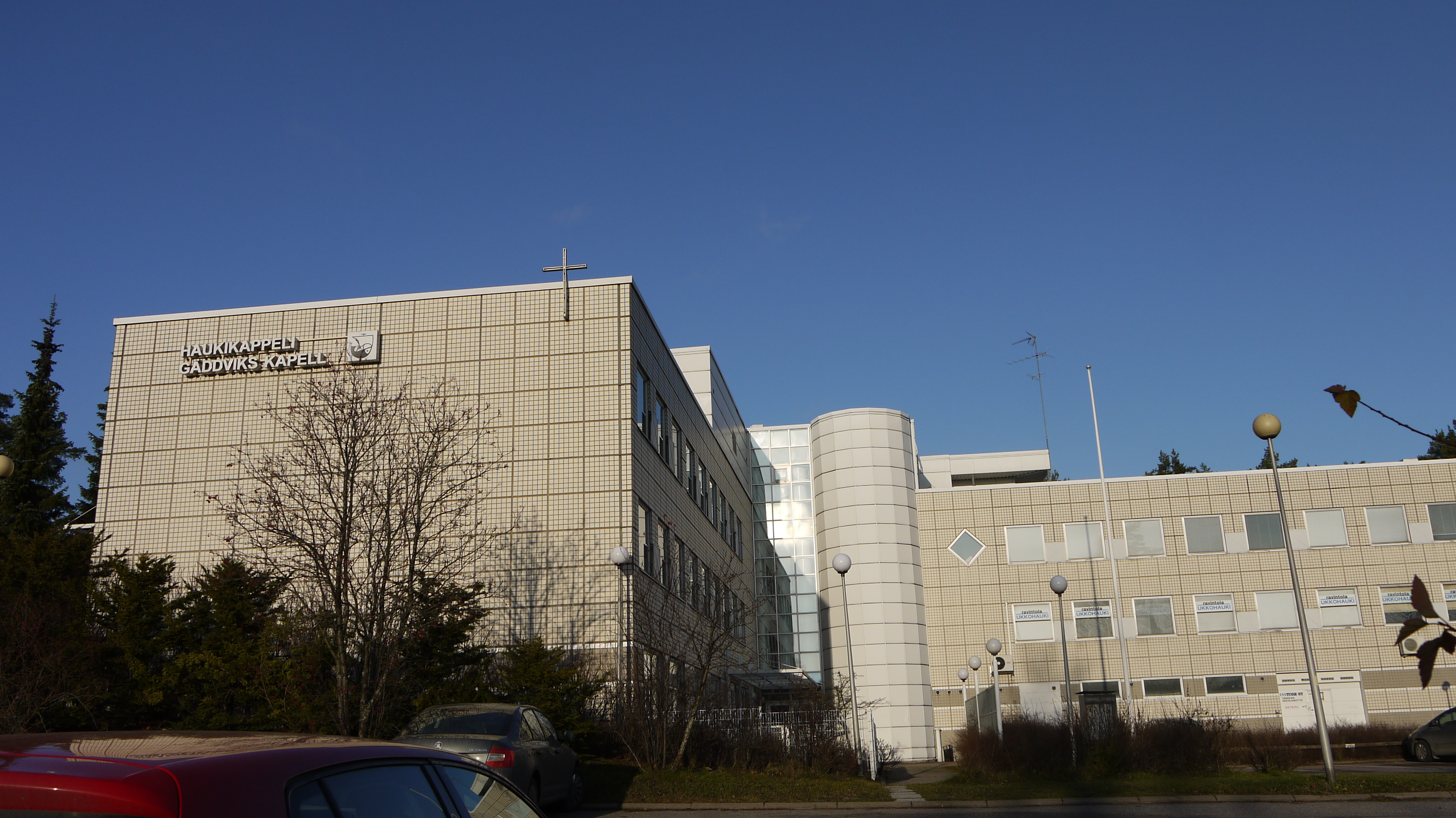
The Haukikappeli chapel was located in an office building next to the Länsiviitta shopping centre from 1991 to 2016.

Haukilahti belongs to the Diocese of Olari, which is part of the Union of Dioceses in Espoo. There were 4029 households belonging to the Diocese of Olari in the Haukilahti-Niittykumpu area, which comprised 27 percent of the member households of the diocese.

The Diocese of Olari maintained the Haukikappeli chapel near the Länsiviitta shopping centre, inaugurated on 15 September 1991, which provided events for baptism and marriage and to some extent also funerals. There were a hundred seating places in Haukikappeli. The Diocese of Olari sold the chapel and the last mass was held in the chapel in spring 2016. A new apartment building was built in the place of Haukikappeli.

== Transport ==
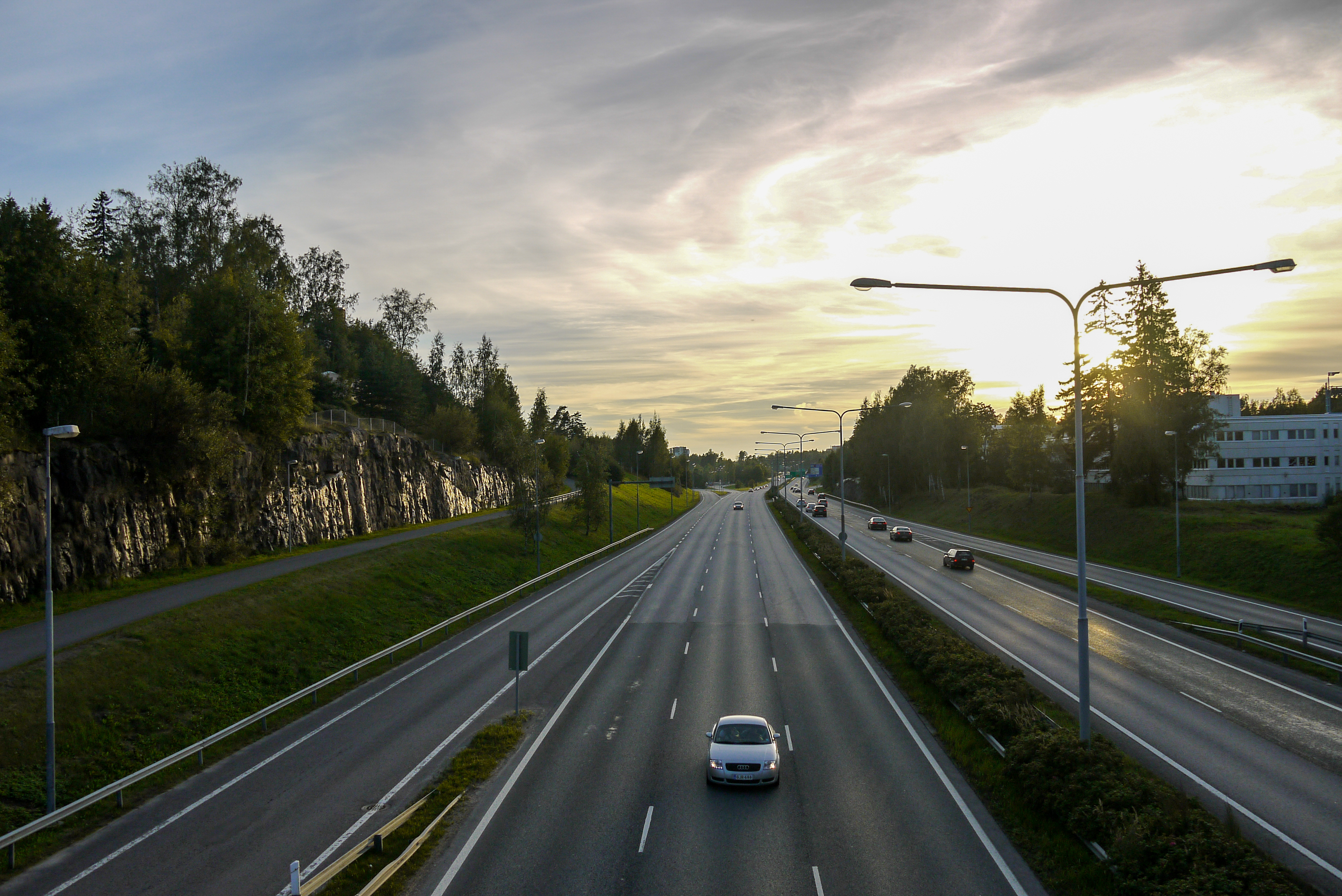
A view of Länsiväylä at Haukilahdensolmu.

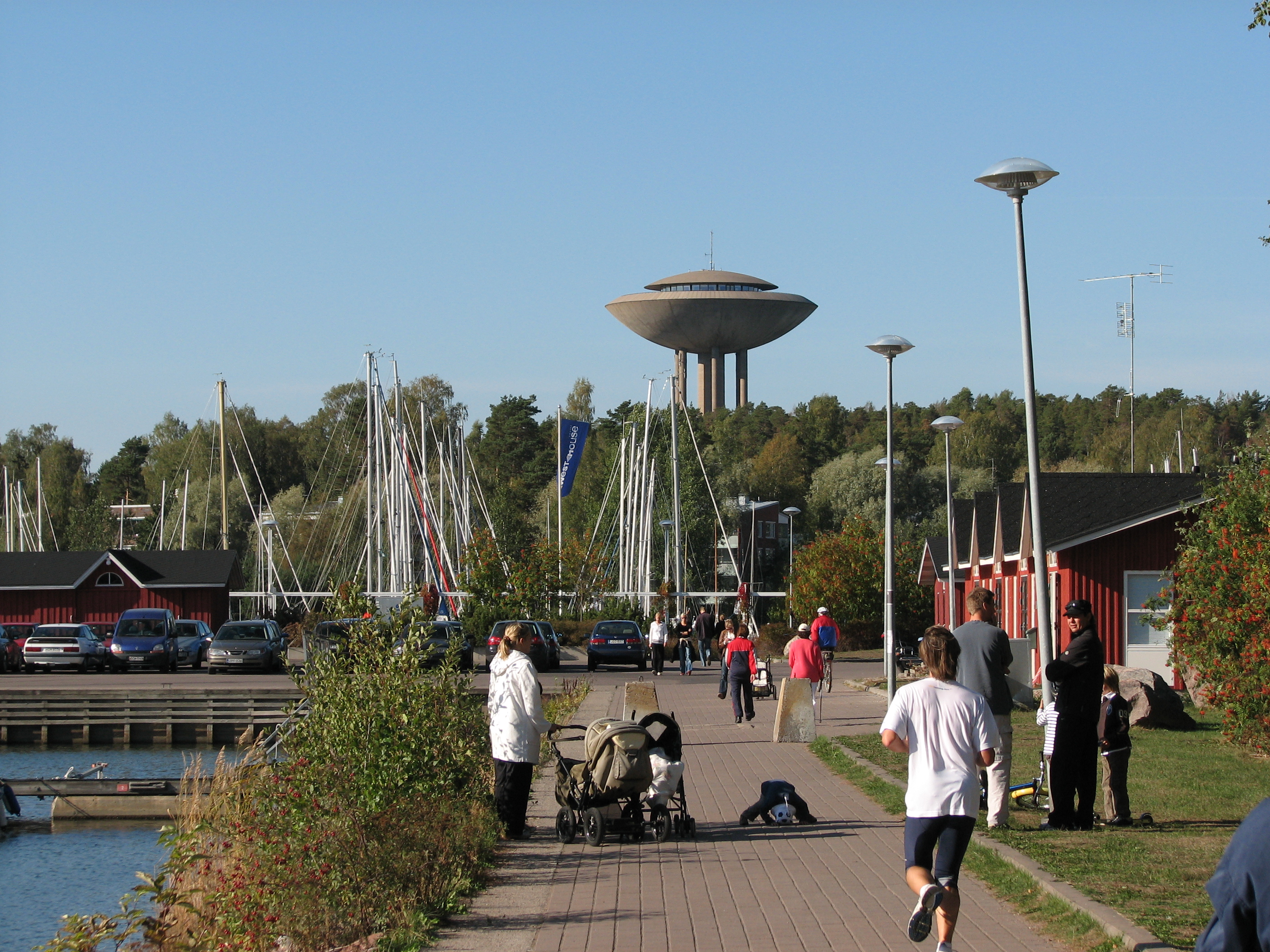
The Mellsten boat harbour is popular among boat owners.

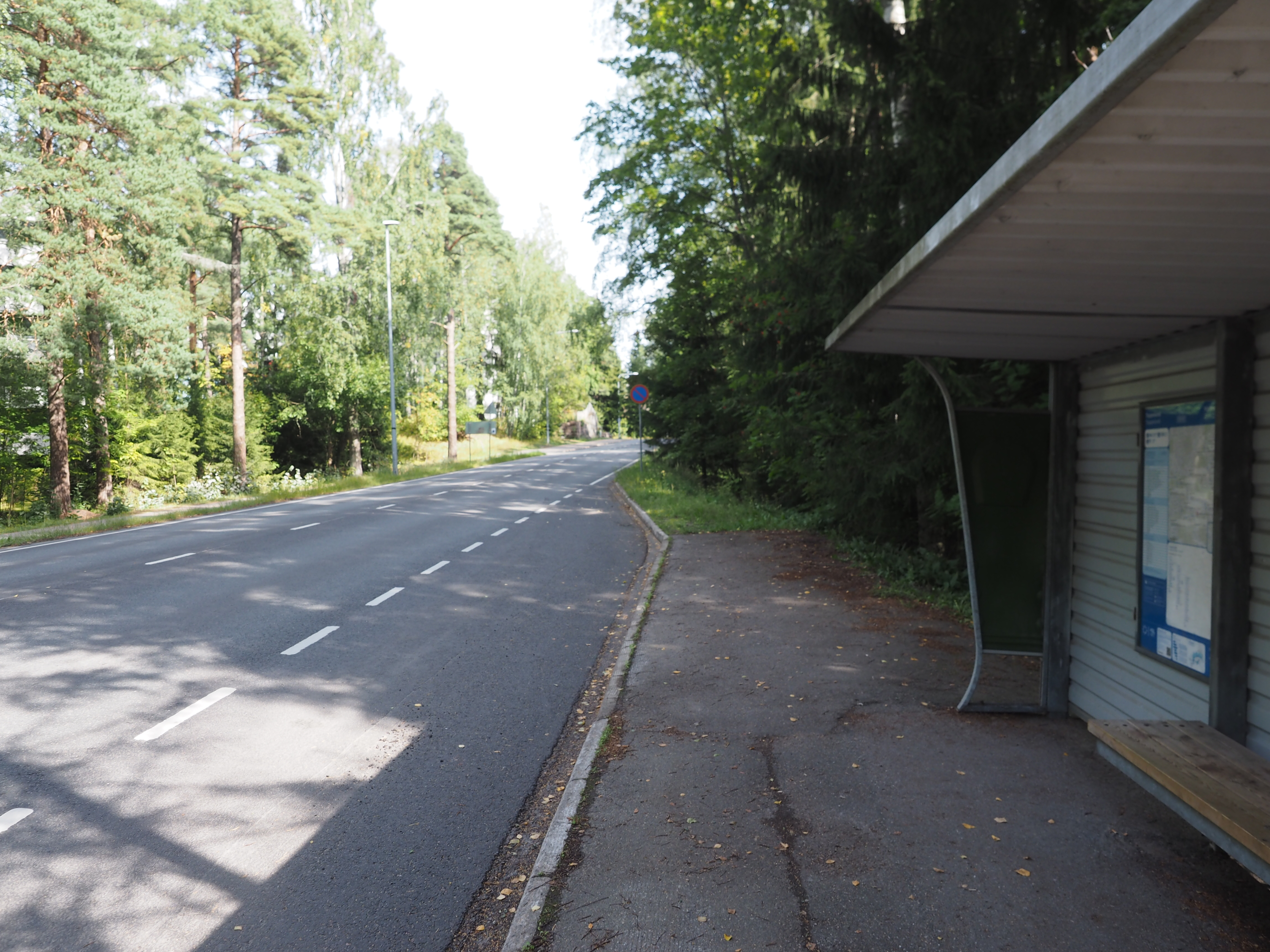
A bus stop on the street Toppelundintie in Haukilahti, serving eastbound bus lines 105 to Lauttasaari and 111 to Otaniemi.

Haukilahti is served by the following bus lines of the Helsinki Regional Transport Authority:

- 105: Lauttasaari (M) - Westend - Haukilahti
- 111: Otaniemi - Tapiola (M) - Westend - Matinkylä (M) - Hyljelahti
- 112: Tapiola (M) - Niittykumpu - Haukilahti - Matinkylä (M)
- 112N: Kamppi - Lauttasaari (M) - Westend - Matinkylä (M) - Friisilä

"(M)" denotes a bus stop near a Helsinki Metro station.

Haukilahti does not have a metro station of its own, but it is located approximately halfway between the Tapiola and Niittykumpu metro stations, slightly to the south of the metro line.

The Länsiväylä highway allows good car and bus traffic connections from Haukilahti to Helsinki in the east and Kirkkonummi in the west. The street network in Haukilahti has not seen significant development since the 1964 zoning plan save for changes in street names. The main ways for traffic are still Haukilahdenkatu, Toppelundintie and Hauenkalliontie as specified in the zoning plan. The main entrance way to the area is Haukilahdenkatu, joining the Länsiväylä highway at Haukilahdensolmu.

There is a boat harbour in Haukilahti with 637 boat places (170 belonging to the city of Espoo) and 324 car places. There are four boat clubs operating at the harbour: Haukilahden venekerho, Espoon merenkävijät, Mellstenin venekerho and Matinkylän venekerho. From early June to early September the harbour has an archipelago ship traffic connection to the nearby outdoor island of Iso Vasikkasaari.

== See also ==
- Districts of Espoo
- Haukilahti water tower
