= Otaniemi water tower =

Finnish water tower

Coordinates: 60.1812°N 24.8199°E

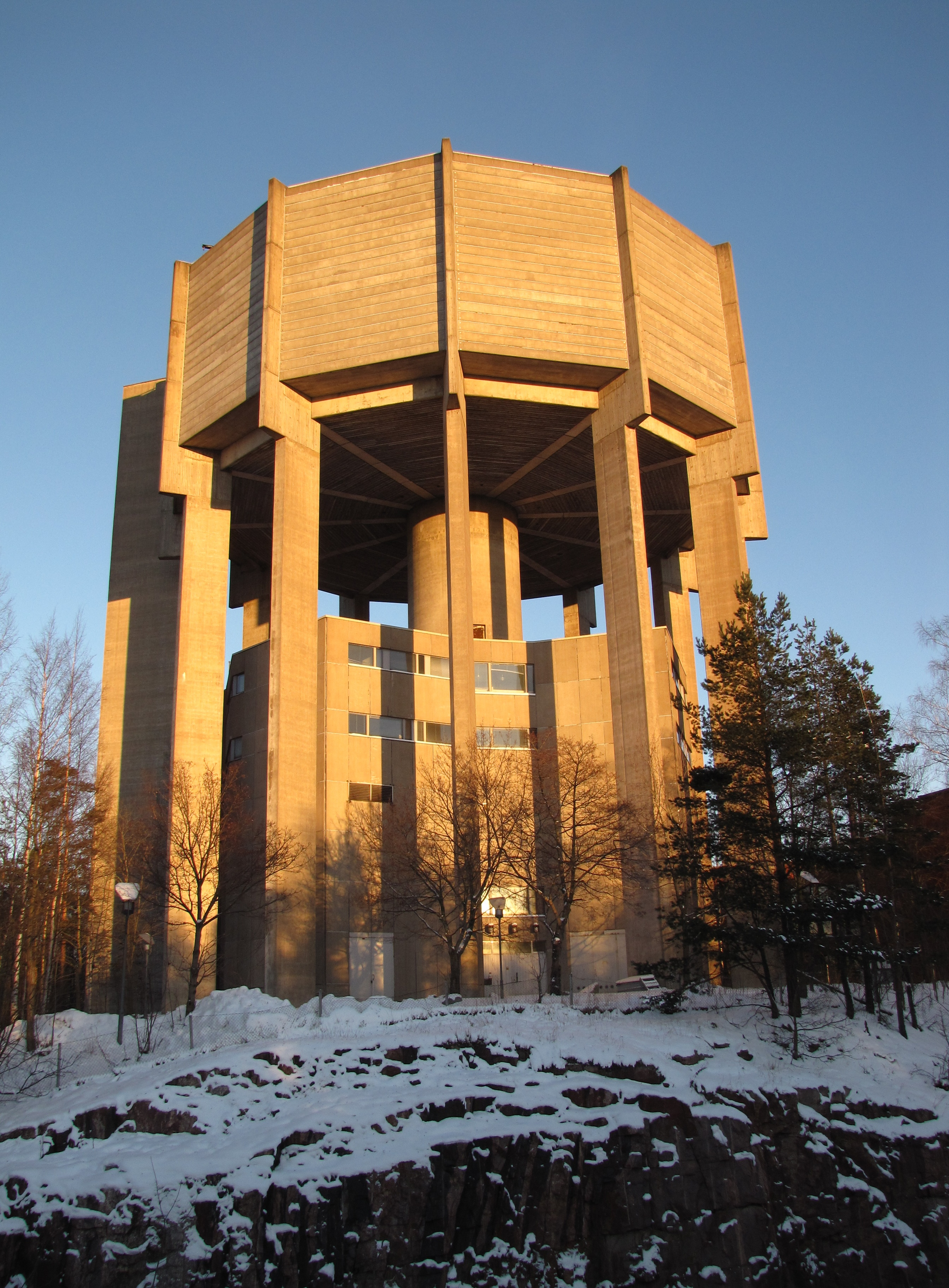
Otaniemi water tower in 2010

The Otaniemi water tower is a structure designed by the well-known Finnish architect Alvar Aalto in 1971. The water tower is located in Otaniemi area, Espoo, Finland. The total capacity of the tower is 6000 m³. It rises to a height of 45 meters. It is Otaniemi's principal landmark, and consists of two stacked elements - the water storage tank and a free-form, five-story building constructed underneath containing the technical spaces and offices.
