= Alepa =

Finnish grocery store chain

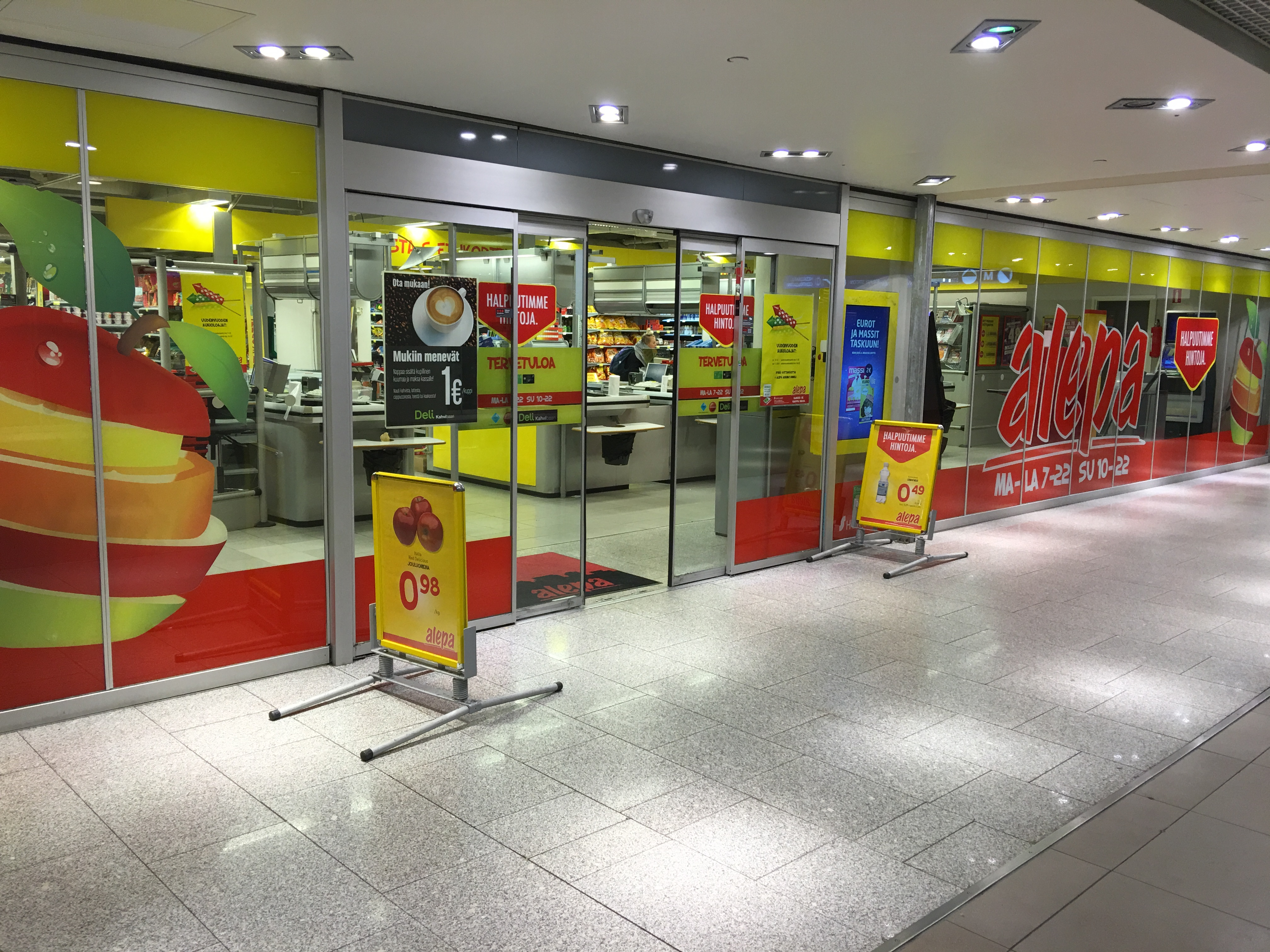
Alepa in Citycenter mall, Helsinki; unit since defunct.

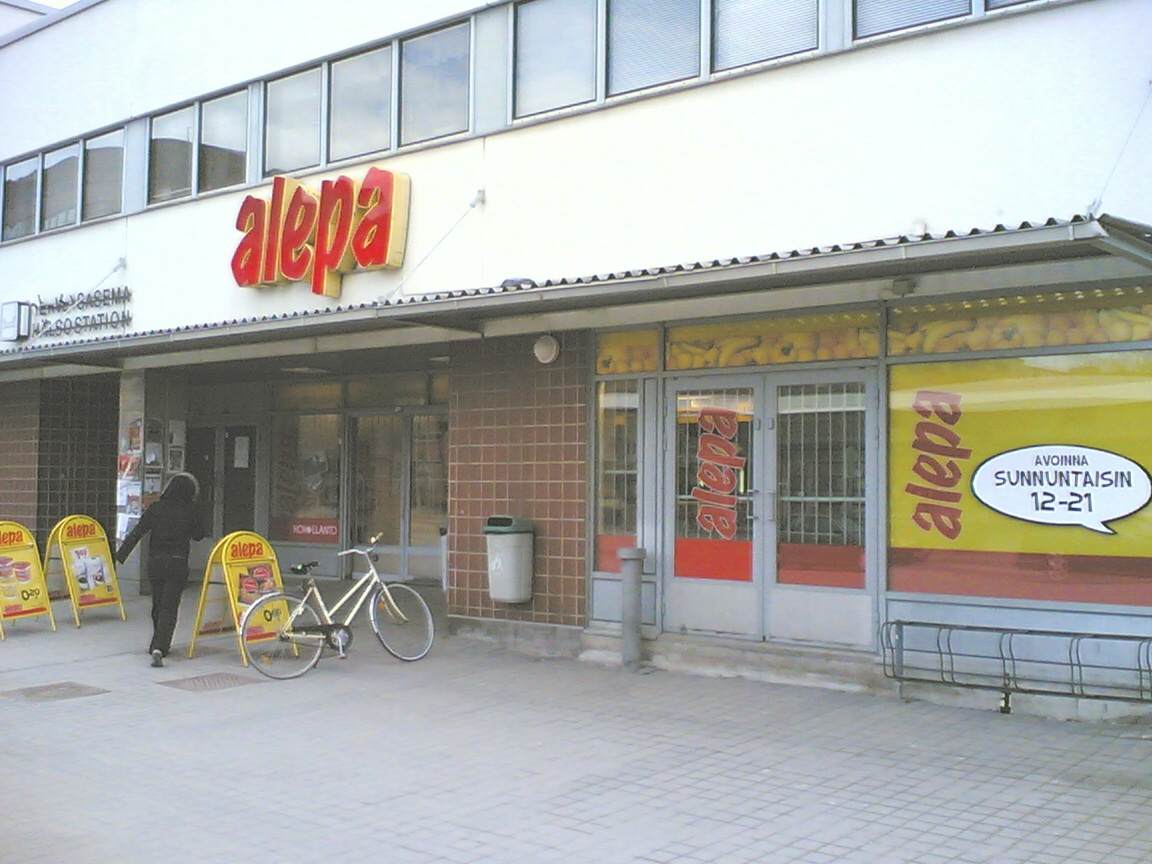
Alepa in Pukinmäki, Helsinki

Alepa is a grocery shop chain in the Greater Helsinki region of Finland. It is currently owned by HOK-Elanto, a part of the nationwide cooperative S Group. Alepa was founded in 1918, when Edvard Pajunen and his wife founded a shop in Sörnäinen, Helsinki.

The original name of Alepa was Alennushalli Pajunen (Pajunen's Discount Hall), named after the founder. The Pajunen family sold the chain to HOK in 1987.

As of May 2017, the chain includes 112 stores in Helsinki, Espoo, Vantaa, Hyvinkää, Kerava, Klaukkala, Järvenpää and Tuusula. Outside of this region, the S Group uses the brand Sale for similar stores.
