= Pär Stenbäck =

Finnish politician

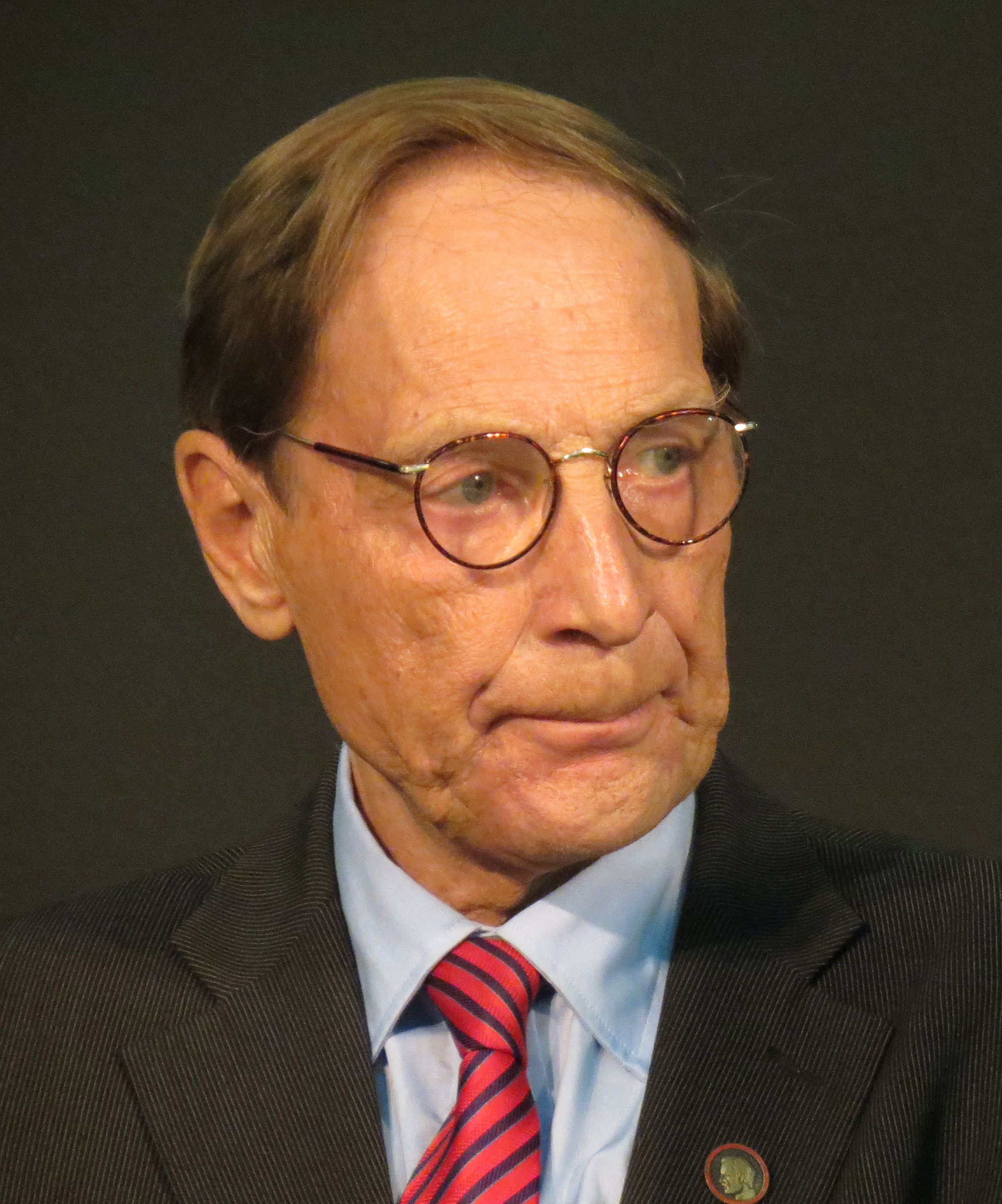

Secretary General of the Nordic Council of Ministers
- In office 1992–1997

general secretary for the International Federation of the Red Cross and Red Crescent Societies
- In office 1988–1992

Party Leader of the Swedish People's Party
- In office 1977–1985

Minister of Foreign Affairs
- In office 1982–1983

Minister of Education
- In office 1979–1982

Member of the Finnish Parliament
- In office 1970–1985

Personal details
- Born: 12 August 1941 (age 85) Porvoo
- Party: Swedish People's Party
- Education: University of Helsinki
- Occupation: journalist and politician

Pär Stenbäck (born 12 August 1941 in Porvoo) is a Finland-Swedish politician and debater. Stenbäck was elected to the Finnish parliament at the age of 28 and functioned as the party chairman for the Swedish People's Party 1977–1985. He was Minister of Education and then Foreign Minister in two governments, 1979–1983. This was followed by significant roles within the International Red Cross, International Youth Foundation, the Nordic Council of Ministers, the Swedish Cultural Foundation in Finland and several other organisations.

== Career ==
Stenbäck is the son of Mikael Stenbäck och Rakel Granholm. He graduated from Borgå lyceum in 1960 and then studied political science at Helsinki University, student politics and journalism. He had assignments at Nya Pressen and Borgåbladet, worked as the editor of Studentbladet, and then held editorial tasks at Nya Argus, Ulkopolitiikka and worked as a journalist for YLE from 1964 to 1967. On the political side of things he was involved in Nyliberala studentförbundet and Svensk Ungdom, the youth wing of the Swedish People's Party of Finland, whose election campaigns he also took part in. In 1973 he graduated with a master's degree in political science.

Stenbäck has been a member of the city council of Espoo, and also the Finnish parliament (1970–1985). He was the Minister of Education (1979 to 1982), Minister of Foreign Affairs (1982 to 1983) and Party Leader of the Swedish People's Party (1977 to 1985). He received an Honorary Minister title in 1999.

Pär Stenbäck was director of the Hanasaari Swedish-Finnish cultural centre, which he had helped to create, from 1974 to 1985. He has also been the general secretary for the International Federation of the Red Cross and Red Crescent Societies (IFRC) in Geneva from 1988 to 1992.

Between 1992 and 1997 he functioned as the Secretary General of the Nordic Council of Ministers in Copenhagen. In 1991, he took part in the founding of the International Youth Foundation (IYF), now situated in Baltimore, as a director 1991–1996, thereafter as VP for Europe until 2005. In 1995, he became a founding board member of the International Crisis Group. In 2001, together with ambassador Karl-Erik Norrman, he founded the European Cultural Parliament, where he is the Chairman of the Senate. In the same year, he founded the Finnish Children and Youth Foundation and acted as its board chair until 2012. In June 2017, he founded the foreign policy association Nya Utrikespolitiska Samfundet.

In 1970, Stenbäck married Sissel Lund.

== Publications ==
Stenbäck has published two books depicting his career in politics and in the Red Cross/Red Crescent movement (2007 and 2009). He is a regular columnist in the daily Hufvudstadsbladet (Helsinki).

- 2021, All världens vägar, Reflektioner på distans ISBN 9789527224434
- 2018, Demokrati under hot? ISBN 9789525864861
- 2009, Kriser och katastrofer: politik och humanitärt arbete ISBN 9789515018908
- 2007, När världen öppnade sig: en sextiotalskrönika ISBN 9789515016935

== Awards and recognition ==
- 1982, The Grandcross of Order of the Falcon, Iceland
- 1983, Commander of the Order of the Lion of Finland
- 1991, Commander of the Order of the White Rose of Finland
- 1999, Honorary Minister title in Finland
- 2009, Henry Dunant Medal, International Red Cross/Red Crescent
- 2012, Swedish Academy Finland Prize
- Order of Francisco de Miranda
- Order of the Dannebrog
- Commander Grand Cross of the Order of the Polar Star
- Grand Cross of the Order of St. Olav
