= Ernst von Born =

Finnish politician (1885–1956)

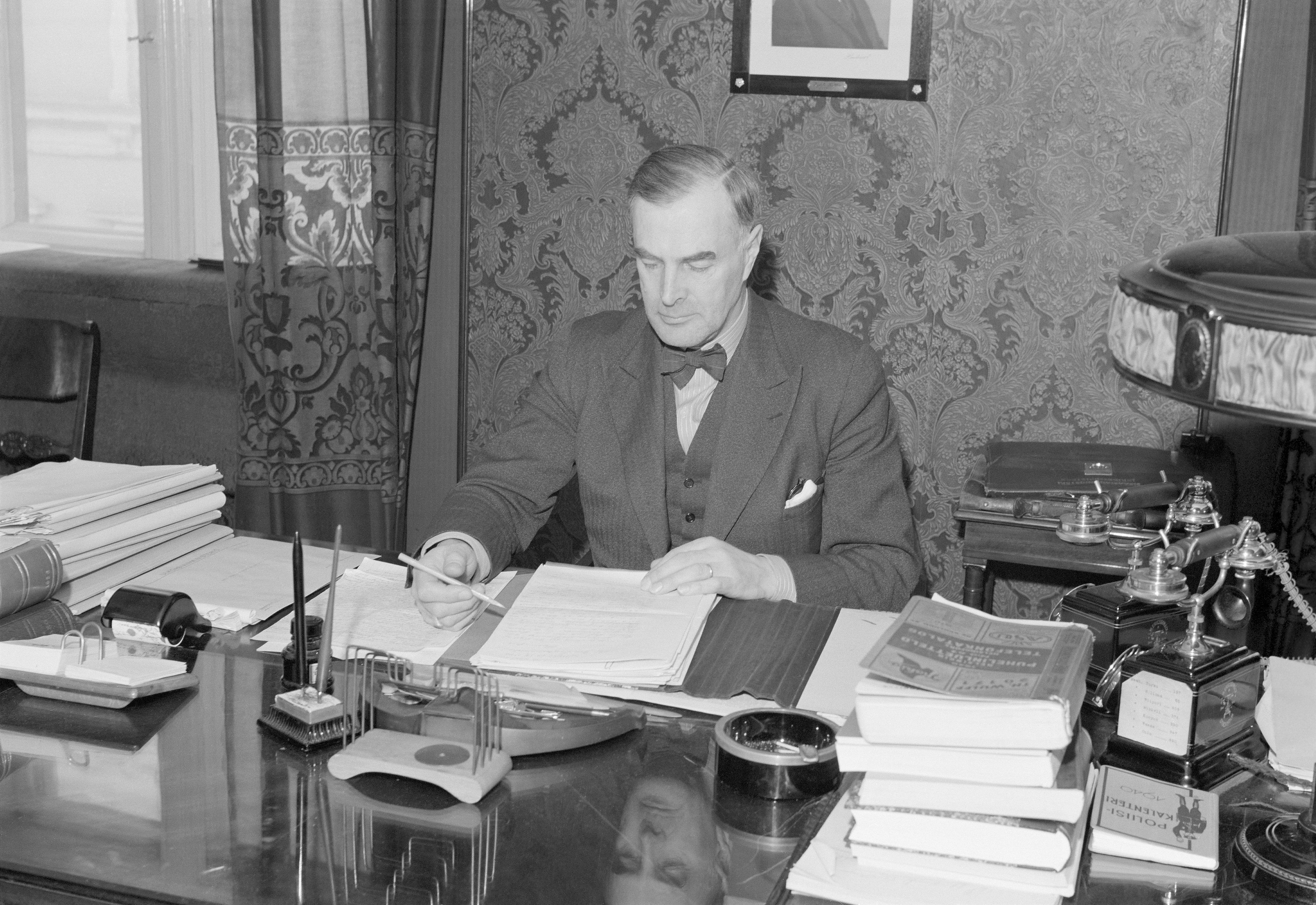
Baron Ernst von Born

Baron Ernst Viktor Lorentz von Born (24 August 1885, Pernå, Grand Duchy of Finland - 7 July 1956) was a Finnish lawyer, farmer and politician.

He was a member of the Parliament of Finland from 1919 to 1954, representing the Swedish People's Party of Finland, and served as the party's chairman from 1934 to 1945 and again from 1955 to 1956. He held several ministerial posts, including Minister of the Interior from March 1931 to December 1932 and from December 1939 to May 1941, and Minister of Justice from August to November 1944. During the peace negotiations in Moscow in September 1944, he served as acting Prime Minister after Prime Minister Antti Hackzell suffered a stroke.

During the Continuation War, he was one of the signatories of the "Petition of the Thirty-three", which was presented to President Ryti by members of the Peace opposition on 20 August 1943.

== Biography ==
Ernst von Born was the son of Viktor Magnus von Born and Hulda Augusta, née Berndtson, daughter of Fredrik Berndtson. In the spring of 1900, the family moved to Helsinki and he began the fifth grade of the Svenska Normallyceum. He graduated in 1904 and started studying law the same year at the University of Helsinki. He graduated with a law degree in 1909, practiced law at the Turku Court of Appeal and received the title of varatuomari in 1912, and worked as a practicing lawyer until 1913.

In 1913, he was also the police mayor of Helsinki and was convicted in this position for violating the so-called Equality Act and spent three months in Kresty Prison in Petrograd in 1915. The following year he took over the ancestral estate of Stor-Sarvlax in Pernå, where he was chairman of the municipal council and the municipal assembly from 1918 to 1945.

During the Civil War, von Born was active in the White Guard movement and participated on the side of the Whites. In March 1918, he joined the Thesleff Jäger Battalion, led by Lieutenant Colonel Wilhelm Thesleff.

=== Political career ===
As Minister of the Interior during the turbulent years of 1931–1932, he vigorously maintained legal order against the Lapua movement. He was elected as an elector in all interwar electoral elections, i.e. in 1925, 1931 and 1937. He served again as Minister of the Interior in 1939–1941 and from October to November 1944.

In 1944, serving as Minister of Justice, von Born joined the peace faction within the government during the Continuation War and was among the signatories of the Petition of the Thirty-three, presented to President Ryti on 20 August 1943. When Prime Minister Antti Hackzell suffered a stroke during the peace negotiations in Moscow in September, von Born, who was the oldest in the government, had to step in as acting Prime Minister for two weeks, when he was given the main responsibility for these peace negotiations. The last thing he did in his role as Minister of Justice was to grant amnesty to 700 people who had been convicted or imprisoned for treason.

Ernst von Born was also a prominent defender of Swedish culture in Finland. In 1932–1935 he was chairman of the Swedish People's Party parliamentary group and in 1934–1945 and 1955–1956 the party's chairman. He was also chairman of the Swedish Assembly of Finland in 1944 and 1951. In 1933 he served as a corresponding member of the Sweden-based National Association for the Preservation of Swedishness Abroad. He also published numerous writings on the language question in Finland and left informative memoirs.

In 1954, von Born was awarded an honorary doctorate in law by the University of Helsinki.

=== Other roles ===
von Born held several other prominent positions, serving as chairman of the Nyland and Tavastehus County Agricultural Society from 1926 to 1956, and of the Union of Swedish Rural Municipalities in Finland and the Union of Swedish Agricultural Societies in Finland from 1937. He was a member of the board of Östra Nylands Newspaper and Printing Company Ltd from 1938, and its chairman from 1946.

Von Born married the actress Alix Ellen Toivi von Born, née Selin (1895–1976), in 1918. After his death, she bequeathed the Storsarvlax estate to Svenska Kulturfonden.

== Bibliografi ==
- Den svenska nationaliteten i Finland (ertillsammans med G. Nikander, 1921)
- ”Lex Kallio” (1923)
- Den nuvarande språklagstiftningen i Finland (1924)
- Aktuella svenskhetsfrågor (1927)
- Svensk riksdagspolitik (1931)
- Kring presidentvalet (1937)
- Levnadsminnen (1954).

== Awards ==
- Order of the Cross of Liberty, 2nd Class
- Commander of the Order of the Polar Star
- First Class Commander of the Order of the White Rose of Finland
- First Class Commander of the Order of Vasa
- Commander of the Order of Vasa
- Commander of the Order of the White Rose of Finland
- Grand Cross of the Order of the Lion of Finland
- Order of the Cross of Liberty, 4th Class
- Commanders Grand Cross of the Order of the Polar Star
