= Hanasaari =

Hanasaari can refer to the following places in Finland:

- Hanasaari, Helsinki, a neighbourhood and a former island in Helsinki
- Hanasaari Power Plant, a coal power plant located in the neighbourhood of Hanasalmi in Helsinki
- Hanasaari, Espoo, an island and a neighbourhood in the district of Westend in Espoo
- Hanasaari Swedish-Finnish cultural centre, a cultural centre located in the neighbourhood of Hanasaari in Espoo
