= Tvijälp =

Island in Espoo, Finland

Coordinates: 60°9′21.60″N 24°48′16.40″E

Tvijälp is one of the outdoor islands in Espoo, Finland. It is located in the Linholmsfjärden sea area a couple of kilometres east from the Haukilahti boat harbour. Tvijälp belongs to the district of Westend; there is a strait within 200 metres wide between the island and mainland Westend.

The surface area of Tvijälp is about 13.4 hectares. On the eastern part of the island is a narrow bay growing with club-rush, giving the island a "C" shape. The middle part of Tvijälp on the isthmus west of the bay is low ground. The northern part consists of hills growing with coniferous forests, about ten metres above sea level. The southern part has cliffs over fifteen metres high. There are beach meadows all over the island. There are remnants of former fishing culture in the nature of Tvijälp.

Tvijälp belongs to the eastern archipelago of Espoo. To the northeast is Småholm and two the southwest is Varsasaari. Further out to the southeast is Vehkasaari and to the east is Korkeasaari. The island of Koivusaari in Helsinki with its boat harbour and metro station is located about two kilometres north-northeast of Tvijälp. The Hanasaari Swedish-Finnish cultural centre is located about a kilometre and a half northeast from Tvijälp.

The former name of Tvijälp was Tvigölpe. In archaic Swedish the prefix tvi means "double" and gölpe means a shallow bay.

There is another island named Tvijälp in the Suvisaaristo archipelago about seven kilometres west of Tvijälp in Westend.
