= Elsa von Born =

Finland-Swedish female author

Elsa Maria von Born, born June 20, 1879, in Storsarvlax, died December 4, 1956, in Helsinki, was a Finland-Swedish author.

== Biography ==
Elsa von Born was the second oldest daughter of Viktor Magnus von Born and Hulda Augusta Berndtson, who had seven daughters and two sons. She graduated from the Private Swedish Girls' School in Helsinki in 1898. Between 1901 and 1924 she was married to Gustav Adolf Silfverhjelm. In the 1920s and 1930s, more precisely from 1927 to 1931, she undertook study trips to Italy, which she made known in Finland through lectures and newspaper articles. The book Italian Impressions (1936) is based on memories from this time.

Elsa von Born's actual debut as a writer occurred in 1931 with the memoir Nio syskon på landet, which depicts Finnish-Swedish manor life. She worked as a freelance writer and was vice-chairman of the Finnish PEN club from 1935 to 1937 and from 1938 to 1945. Among her other works are Långöfolket (1937), stories of the East Nyland archipelago from the Prohibition era, Beauty and Heart (1941), portraits of famous women from earlier times (among them Rosina Lavonius, Ebba Lavonius, Ellan de la Chapelle, modern Hulda von Born and Emelie Antell), and books about Borgå and Pernå.

== Bibliography ==
- Det var en gång ... : nio syskons äventyr på landet. Helsinki: Söderström. 1945. SELIBR 2573466.
- Ett dramatiskt kvinnoöde från Napoleons tidevarv: hertiginnan d'Abrantès. Helsinki: Söderström. 1942. SELIBR 2573467.
- Ebba Charlotta Lovisa Prinsessa zu Solms-Braunfels, född Lavonius. Helsinki. 1928. SELIBR 2573468.
- Fruntimmersföreningen i Helsingfors r.f. 100 år. Helsinki. 1948. SELIBR 2573469.
- Italienska intryck. Helsinki: Söderström. 1936. SELIBR 2573470.
- Det levande Borgå. Helsinki: Söderström. 1946. SELIBR 1831100.
- Långöfolket. Helsinki: Söderström. 1937. SELIBR 1575365.
- Nio syskon på landet. Helsinki: Söderström. 1931. SELIBR 2286710.
- Pernåboken (in Finnish). Helsinki: Söderström. 1949. SELIBR 1684120.
- Skönhet och hjärta. Helsinki: Söderström. 1941. SELIBR 2573471.
