= Varsasaari =

Island in Finland

Coordinates: 60°9′5″N 24°48′00″E

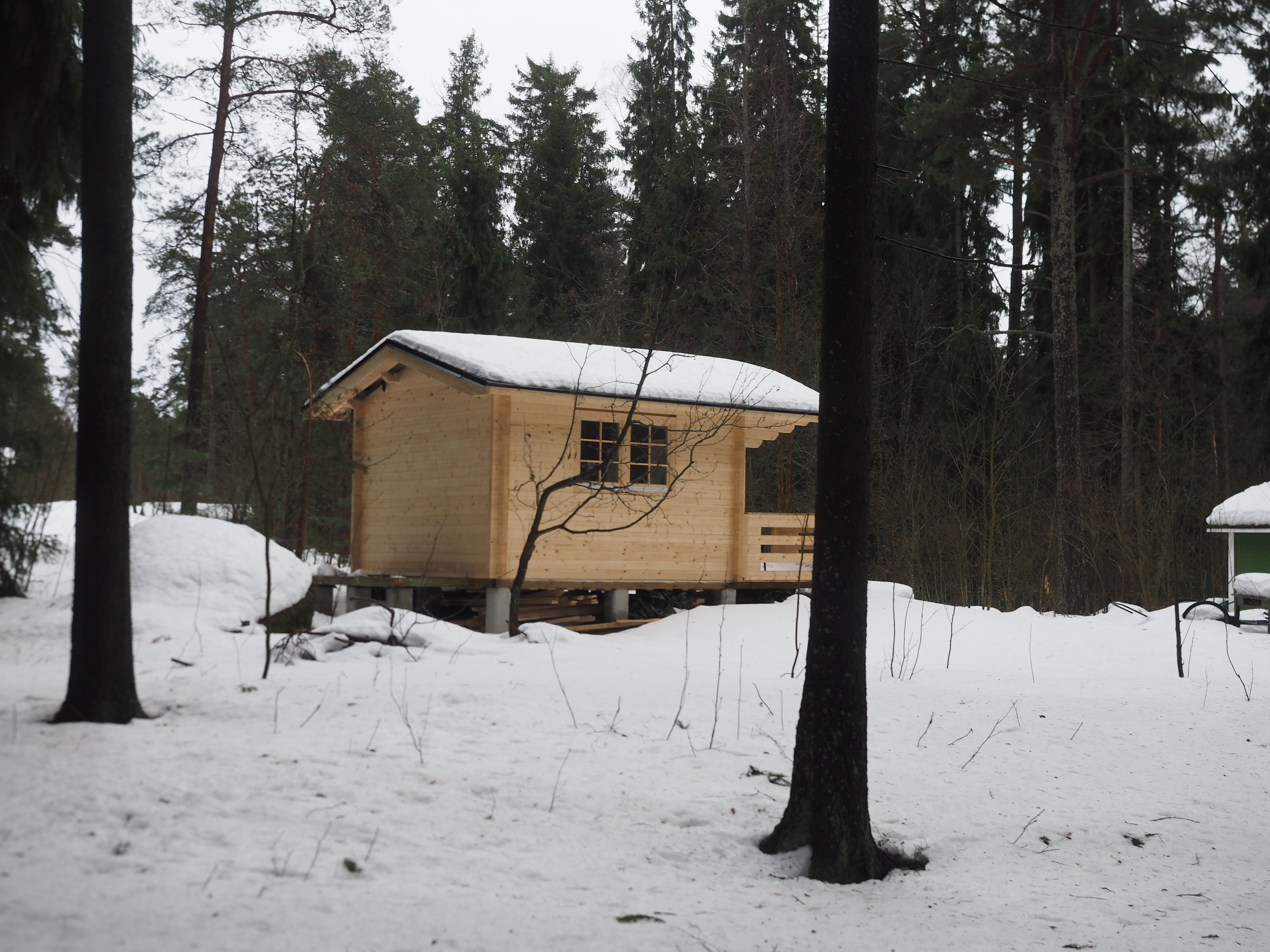
A summer cabin in Varsasaari in winter.

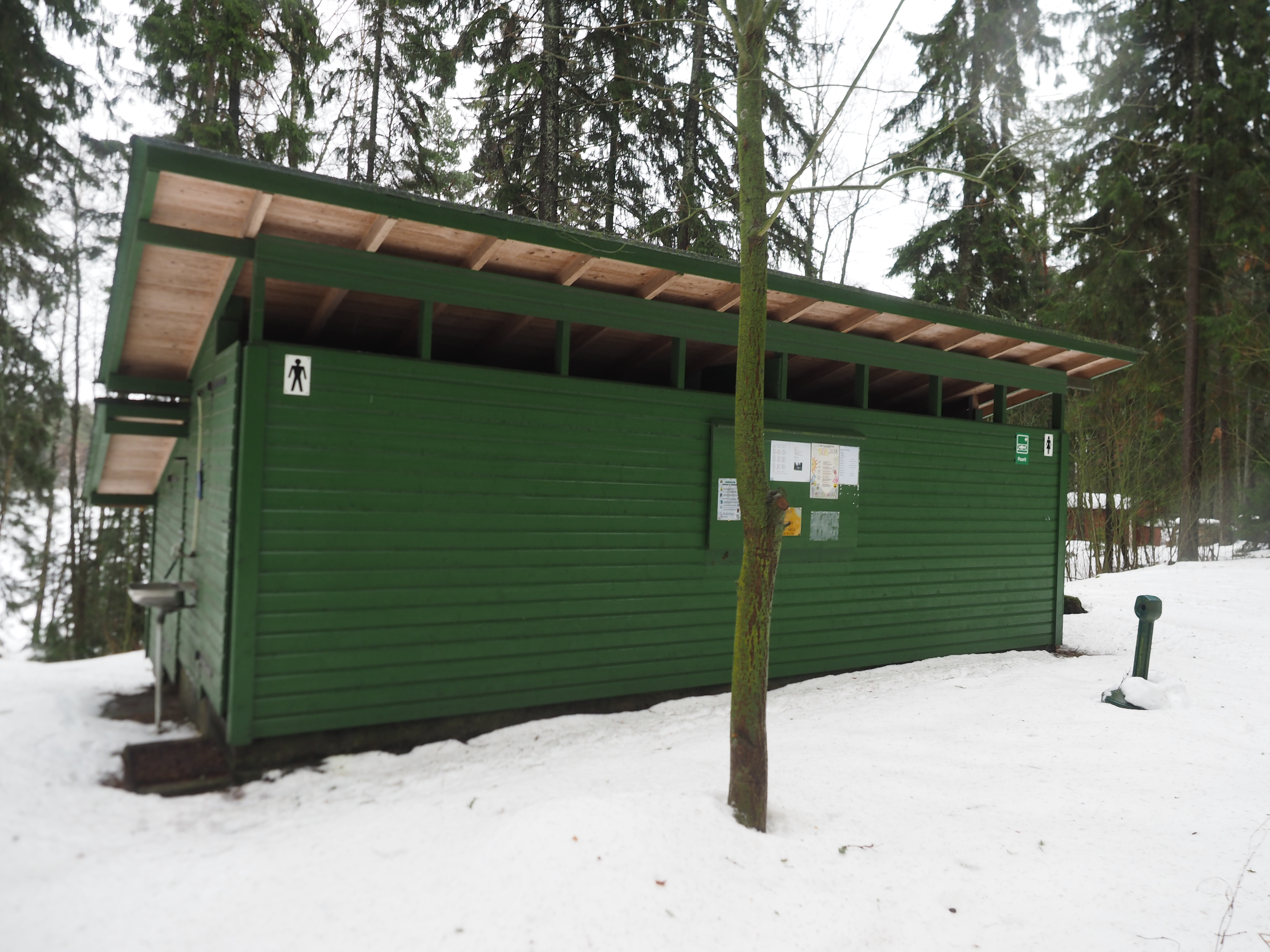
A public toilet in Varsasaari in winter.

Varsasaari (Swedish: Fölisholmen, both meaning "foal island") is an island in the eastern archipelago of Espoo, Finland, mostly used for villas. It is located on the northern part of the Miessaarenselkä strait about a kilometre and a half east of the Haukilahti boat harbour. Varsasaari belongs to the district of Westend, there is a strait two hundred metres wide between the island and mainland Westend.

Varsasaari is owned by the city of Helsinki and it is a public refreshment area. The island is quite tightly built with summer cabins, about 250 in total. Varsasaari is governed by the Varsasaari association, which is responsible for maintaining the island.

On the western shore of Varsasaari is a southwest-facing sandy beach about 170 metres long.

The northern neighbour island of Varsasaari is Tvijälp. In the east are the islands of Vehkasaari and Korkeasaari. Slightly further in the southwest and south are the islands of Iso Vasikkasaari, Miessaari and Stora Ådholmen.
