= Lars Gabriel von Haartman =

Finnish statesman and administrator

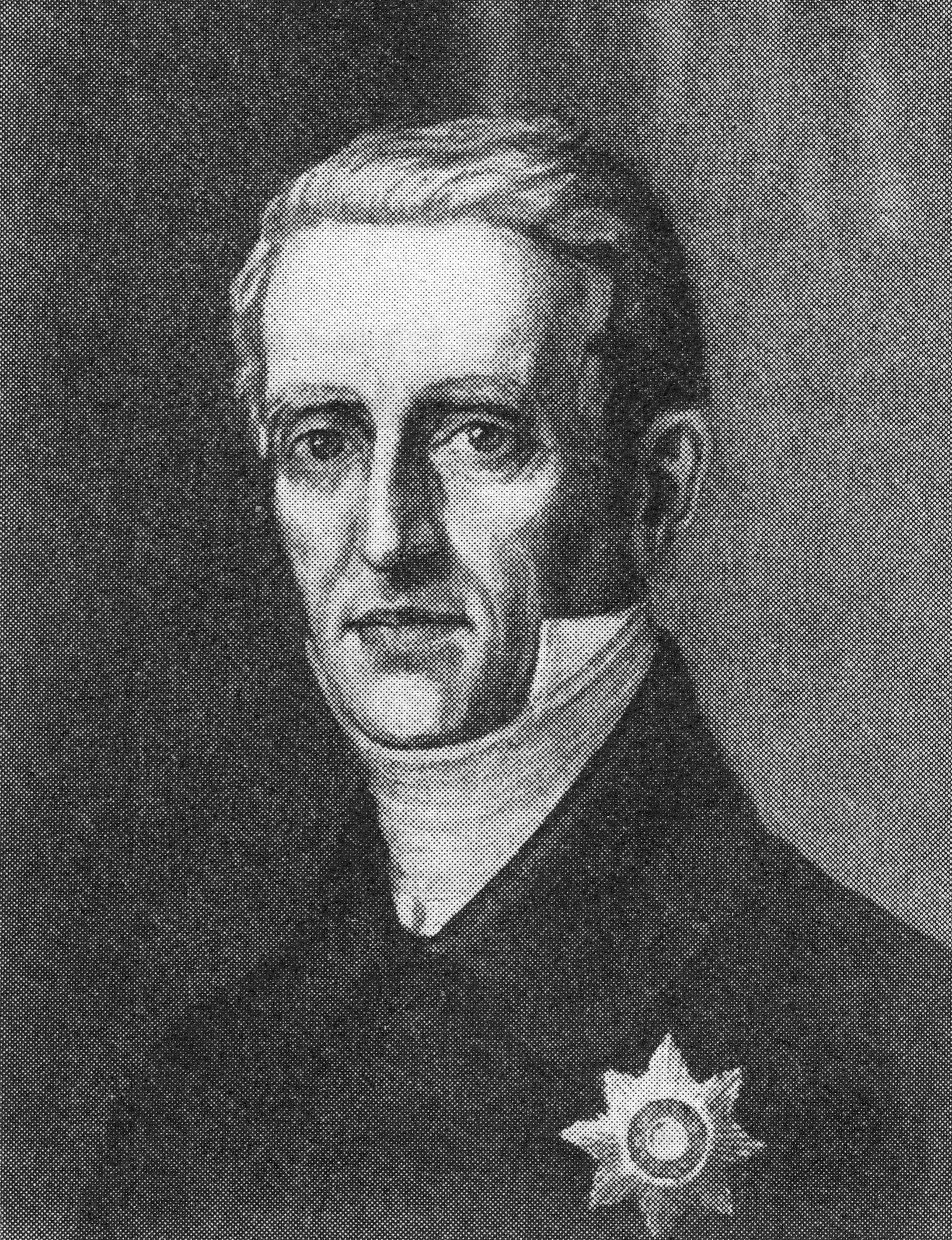
- Born: 23 September 1789; Turku, Kingdom of Sweden
- Died: 16 December 1859 (aged 70); Lempisaari, Askainen, Grand Duchy of Finland
- Occupations: Statesman, administrator
- Relatives: Carl Daniel von Haartman (brother)

Lars Gabriel von Haartman (23 September 1789 – 16 December 1859) was a Finnish statesman and administrator who served in the Finnish Senate under Russian rule. As head of the finance department from 1840 to 1858, he was the dominant figure in Finnish economic administration during the reign of Nicholas I.

== Biography ==
Lars Gabriel von Haartman, who was a Swedish-speaking Finn, was the son of Gabriel Erik von Haartman, professor of medicine at the Royal Academy of Turku, who was ennobled in 1810 in recognition of his loyalty to the Russian conquest of Finland. Lars joined the Ministry of foreign affairs of Russia at a young age, and already in 1811 he became an official of the committee on Finnish Affairs and remained in St. Petersburg until 1827. For reasons of health he was granted leave of absence in 1827 and spent nearly three years abroad, visiting industrial establishments, hospitals, prisons and canals in several countries – among them Sweden, Denmark, and Italy – knowledge that would later prove useful in Finland.

Haartman's first spouse from 1820 was Gustava Maria Sofia Mannerheim, daughter of Count Carl Erik Mannerheim. She died in 1822 and from 1831 he was married to Eva Wilhelmina Charlotta (Minette) Mannerheim, the sister of his first wife. The couple adopted Victor von Haartman in 1837, after the boy had been left an orphan. The couple also had two children of their own: a daughter in 1840 and a son in 1844. The landowner, Reichstag Carl August Gabriel von Haartman (1844–1927) was the son of Lars Gabriel von Haartman from his second marriage.

In 1830 Haartman was appointed to the Finnish Senate and in 1831 became governor of Turku and Pori County, a post he held until 1840. He was appointed head of the finance department in 1840 and vice-chairman of the economic division of the Senate from 1841 until his resignation in 1858.

Among the central measures of his tenure were the currency reform of 1840–1843, which replaced Swedish banknotes with the silver rouble as the sole legal tender in Finland — earning him the nickname Silverlasse — and the completion of the Saimaa Canal in 1856, which he championed not only for its economic benefits but as a means of redirecting Finnish trade away from Sweden and towards Russia. From 1841 he also held the authority to grant confidential reductions in customs duties, the so-called secret tariff, contributing to a substantial rise in state revenues. He repeatedly defended the Bank of Finland against pressure from Governor-General Menshikov, a stance that strained their working relationship over time.

In political terms Haartman held strongly conservative views. He was sceptical of the Fennoman movement and doubted the viability of Finnish as a language of culture. It has been established that the reform programme proclaimed by Alexander II during his Helsinki visit in 1856 had in substance been composed by Haartman himself. He was raised to the rank of baron in 1849. His fierce temper, aggravated by gout, earned him the nickname His Frightfulness among contemporaries.

Lars Gabriel von Haartman died on 16 December 1859 at his estate Lempisaari in Askainen.
