= Västra Nyland =

Newspaper in Finland

- Type: newspaper published 2 times per week
- Format: Tabloid
- Owner: Foreningen Konstsamfundet Association
- Publisher: KSF Media
- Editor: Tommy Westerlund
- Founded: 1881
- Language: Swedish
- Headquarters: Ekenäs
- Website: www.vastranyland.fi

Västra Nyland is a regional Swedish-language newspaper in Finland. The name of the newspaper translates into "The western part of the Nyland region (of Finland)", this region also being the area where the newspaper is circulated. The newspaper is informally called Västis.

== History and profile ==
Västra Nyland was founded in 1881 by Theodor Neovius, and the first edition was published on 7 October the same year. The owner of the paper was a few families. Then Foreningen Konstsamfundet Association became the majority owner of it of which the headquarters is located in Ekenäs. The paper is published two times per week.

Västra Nyland is published in tabloid format and has been published by the KSF Media since 2008. The company also publishes Hufvudstadsbladet, Östra Nyland, Hangötidningen, Borgåbladet and Loviisan Sanomat. The paper has a liberal stance and has no political affiliation.

In 1996, the circulation of Västra Nyland was 10,823 copies. It was 10,033 copies in 2012.

The newspaper is a member of MIDAS (European Association of Daily Newspapers in Minority and Regional Languages).
