= Espoo outdoor islands =

Islands in Espoo, Finland

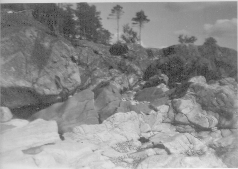
Cliffs formed by the sea on the southern shore of Kaparen.

The Espoo outdoor islands are territories owned by the city of Espoo, Finland, which are suitable for hiking, and some of which are suitable for overnight camping.

The city of Espoo has twelve outdoor islands. There are public boat connections to Iso Vasikkasaari and to the outer islands of Stora Herrö, Rövaren and Gåsgrund. The M/S Aurora departs from Otaniemi and the M/S Tuulikki from Kivenlahti.

It is possible to land with one's own boat in Knapperskär, Kaparen, Rövargrundet, Fölisholmen and Tvijälp in Westend. Knapperskär and Fölisholmen are suitable for overnight tenting, and the islands have barbecue facilities and dry toilets. There is a small cabin built by the local hunting society on Knapperskär, which is normally not open to the public.

== Stora Herrö ==
The southern edge of the 44.3 hectare Stora Herrö is on the side of Kirkkonummi. The northeastern point of the island is owned by Espoo and is suitable for outdoor hiking. The forest is partly dense, and blueberry shoots descend as mats over the hills. In autumn the island has lingonberry and mushrooms.

The island has a viewing tower, where the lights of Tallinn, Estonia can be seen in good weather. The sauna is rented to societies and organisations. There is a possibility for tenting, a cooking area with firewood and a toilet. There are attaching hooks for personal boats and a beach with fine sand.

== Iso Vasikkasaari ==
The nature of Iso Vasikkasaari is diverse and strong. A public transport boat stops at the quay on the island. Except for the northwestern corner the entire island is suitable for hiking. Perhaps the most unusual building in Espoo is located on private property: a villa built in the style of a temple for Poseidon, commissioned by banker Abel Landén for his son-in-law, professor of the Greek language Ivar Heikel in the late 19th century. The shores of the island are circled with meadows, which are the most diverse on the southern part of the island. There is an old fisherman's building on the island, currently serving as a kiosk. Tenting is forbidden on the island. In summertime there is a restaurant Gula Villan on the island.

== Gåsgrund ==
Gåsgrund is about nine hectares in area, and has more cliffs than Stora Herrö. There is a possibility for tenting and cooking facilities with firewood, a toilet and a sauna free for public use. On the southeastern shore there are attaching hooks for boats on the concrete quay. A public transport boat stops on the island.

== Rövaren ==
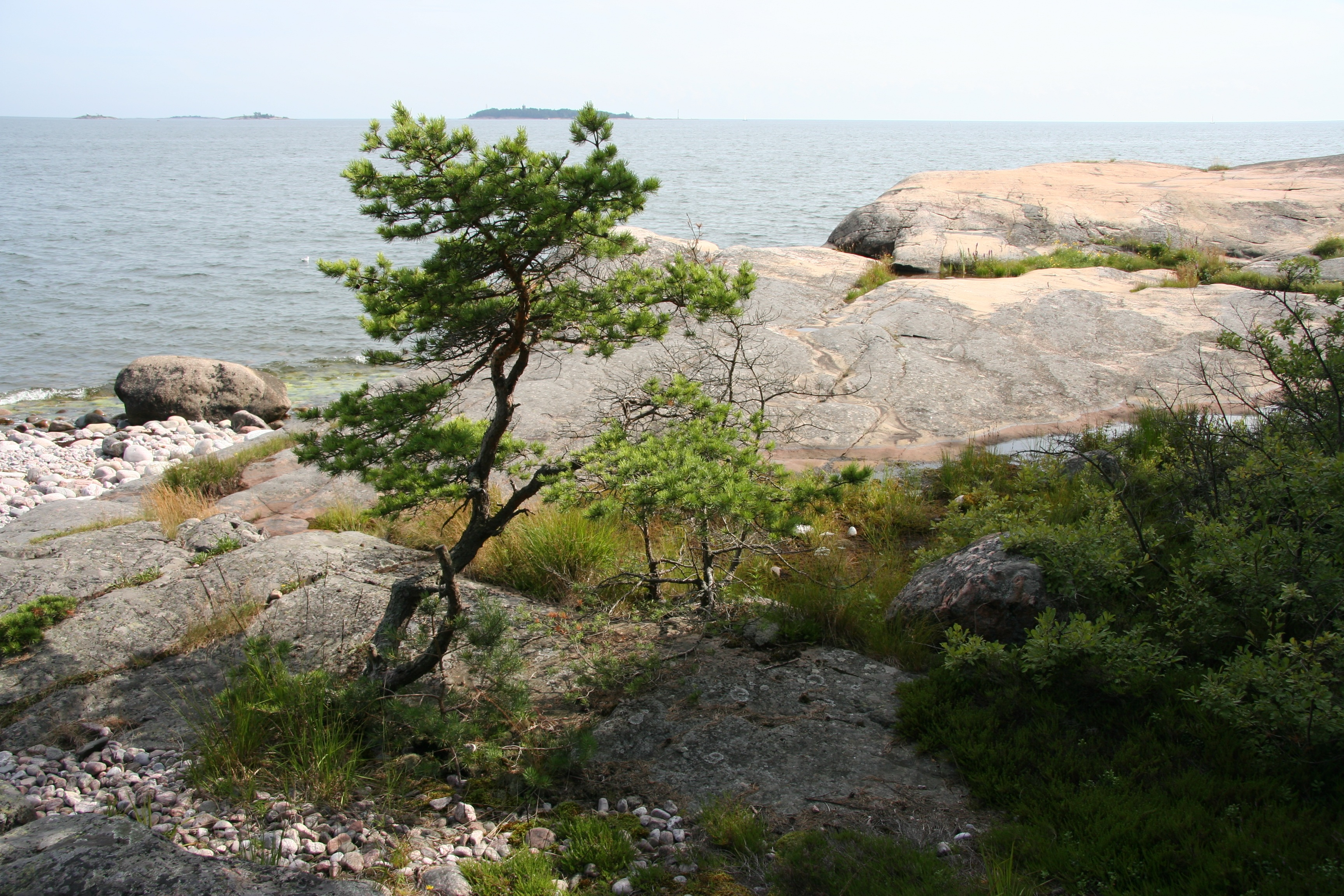
Landscape of Rövaren.

Rövaren is about nine hectares in area. The highest cliff is about ten metres high and offers a view to the ship routes. The island has some barbecue facilities and tenting is allowed. The cliffs on the southern shore provide a selection of rock formations caused by the Ice Age and later autumn storms.

== Kaparen ==
Kaparen is a four-hectare outdoor island located in front of Espoo.

== Bylandet ==
Bylandet is a refreshment area owned by Espoo in Kirkkonummi, in front of Porkkala.
