= Viktor Magnus von Born =

Finnish politician (1851–1917)

Baron Viktor Magnus von Born
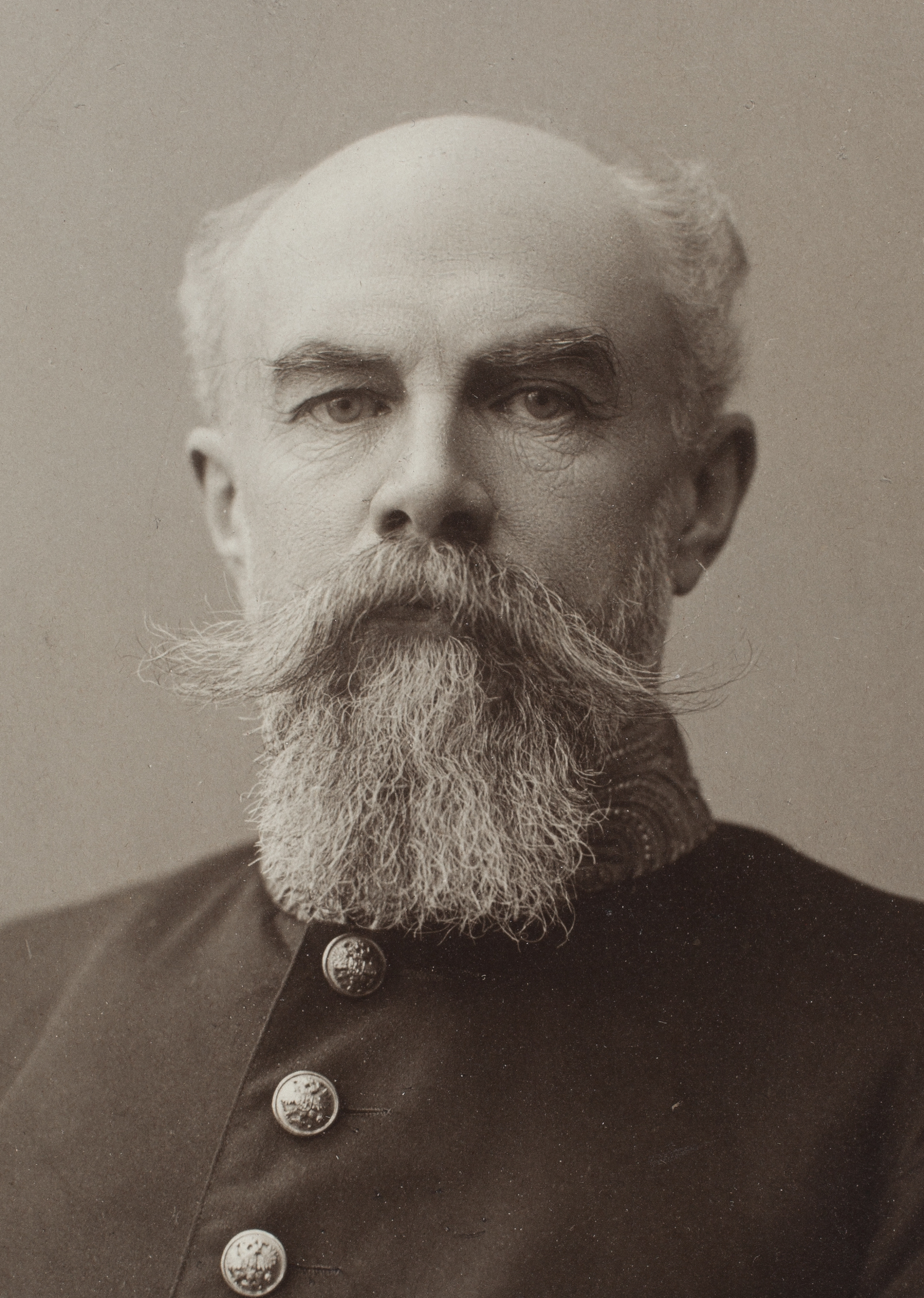
- Baron Viktor Magnus von Born in 1906
- Born: 8 October 1851; Helsinki, Grand Duchy of Finland, Russian Empire (now Finland)
- Died: 15 September 1917 (aged 65); Pernaja, Grand Duchy of Finland, Russian Republic
- Education: Helsinki University
- Occupations: Politician, writer
- Political party: Swedish People's Party of Finland
- Children: Ernst von Born

Baron Viktor Magnus von Born (8 October 1851, Helsinki - 15 September 1917) was a Finnish lawyer, farmer and politician. He was a member of the Diet of Finland from 1877 to 1878 and from 1885 to 1906 and of the Parliament of Finland from 1910 to 1913, representing the Swedish People's Party of Finland (SFP). He was the last Lord Marshal of the Diet of Finland in from 1905 to 1906.

== Biography ==
=== Early years ===
After obtaining his law degree in 1873, von Born worked as a court trainee, secretary of the House of Nobility, and committee secretary at the Helsinki City Council, as well as a city councillor in Helsinki 1878–1879.

He then devoted himself to managing the large estate of Sarvlax, which he inherited from his father in 1878, and his mother's estate Gammelbacka in Porvoo. Von Born served as treasurer and was active in the Eastern Uusimaa Agricultural Guild 1884–1896. He also worked 1888–1900 as an auditor at the Bank of Finland as a representative of the noble estate.

=== Political Career and Resistance to Russification ===
As the head of the von Born family, he made his political debut at the Diet of 1877–78, where he attracted attention with passionate contributions on the question of universal military conscription, which he energetically opposed being introduced in Finland. The reason for his opposition was his fundamental conviction in individual freedom and that the state should respect it. He also attracted attention when, on a couple of occasions, he dissented from the Speaker of the Diet, his father, on the question of the rights of the Finnish language and the Diet's right to examine the state of public finances.

Von Born soon became one of the most significant figures among the nobility and knighthood and also the entire Diet. During the so-called years of oppression, he emerged as one of Nikolay Bobrikov's most consistent and determined opponents. He was one of the leaders of the so-called constitutional struggle over Finland's position with Russia, including as an organiser of conscription strikes. Von Born believed that the only way to resolve the conflict over conscription was to abolish universal military service entirely and instead field recruited troops. In addition to this, he wrote in the illegal magazine Fria Ord, and in February 1899 he took the initiative to establish a "compensation fund" to assist civil servants who had been dismissed for refusing to carry out administrative decrees issued outside the normal Finnish legislative process.

Before the years of oppression, von Born had also been part of a small group from the nobility and burgher estate who in 1891 opposed the so-called Postal Manifesto, which had placed the Finnish postal service under the Russian Ministry of the Interior.

Due to his activities, he was urged in the spring of 1903 to leave the country or risk being taken to Russia. He moved with his family to Sweden and continued his resistance to Russian rule from a villa in Djursholm. Through his second wife, he had good contacts in Sweden. With the help of his cousin Ebba Lavonius, who had become a German princess upon marrying Albrecht zu Solms-Braunfels, von Born attempted to approach the Russian imperial court during a visit to Darmstadt. Von Born participated in international advocacy work on behalf of Finland and was also in contact with the Russian opposition.

In his capacity as a member of the Diet, he was able to return in the autumn of 1904 following a summons to an ordinary session of the Diet. After the general strike of October–November 1905, he was appointed Lord Marshal at the last estate-based Diet in the history of Sweden and Finland (in this capacity he delivered, among other things, the nobility's farewell address in the Finnish House of Nobility).

Von Born also served 1910–13 as a member of the new unicameral Diet, in which he belonged to the Swedish People's Party group. He was, however, never a member of the party.

=== Municipal Politics in Pernå ===
In Pernå, von Born served as chairman of the municipal assembly 1885–1914 and as the first chairman of the municipal council 1910–1914. As a local politician, he had a significant influence on, among other things, municipal administration, social services and education, as well as the restoration of Pernå Church.

=== Other Activities ===
Together with Kasten Antell and Arvid Nyberg, he founded the newspaper Östra Nyland in Loviisa in 1881. He also contributed to the newspapers Wikingen, Nya Pressen and Finsk tidskrift.

He was chairman of the Finnish Husbandry Society 1907–1913.

== Ideology and political views ==
Von Born called himself a conservative, which was reflected among other things in his views on landowners' rights and taxation. At the same time, however, he also advocated for women's equality, freedom of religion, and matters related to strengthening the Diet's legal standing in relation to the executive power. In 1885, von Born was involved in petitioning for a freedom of the press act.

Regarding the language question in Finland, von Born initially held an extremely pro-Swedish stance. In the pamphlet Det svenska partiet he defends the prevailing linguistic conditions and the system of representation. Von Born did, however, criticise the pro-Finnish clergy, which he considered to be an absurd historical anomaly within the estate representation. He also opposed the Fennomania that was favoured by the government. Later, however, he came to accept full equality between the two domestic languages.

Municipal self-governance was something von Born strongly supported. During the Russification period, von Born had early on drawn a connection between municipal self-governance and the constitutional struggle. He was also an advocate of municipal cooperation, which was reflected among other things in one of his first speeches at the Diet, in which he argued for county-level representation.

== Personal life ==
von Born was the son of the senator and chamberlain Baron Johan August von Born and Fanny von Haartman, daughter of the physician Carl Daniel von Haartman. Von Born was married three times: Hulda Augusta Berndtson in 1876 until her death 1891, then Clara Henny Helena Grafström in 1893. In 1908 he married Ellan (Anna Elise) Edelfelt, born de la Chapelle, widow of painter Albert Edelfelt. He was the father of Ernst von Born.

== Bibliography ==
- Det svenska partiet (1887)
- Beskrifning och historia om Sarvlax egendom i Perno socken (1887)
- Beskrifning och historia om Gammelbacka egendom i Borgå socken (1895)
- I värnepliktsfrågan (1898)
- Om lega af jord på landet eller den så kallade torparlagen, utgifven på föranstaltande af Nylands och Tavastehus läns Landtbrukssällskap (1903)

== Gallery ==
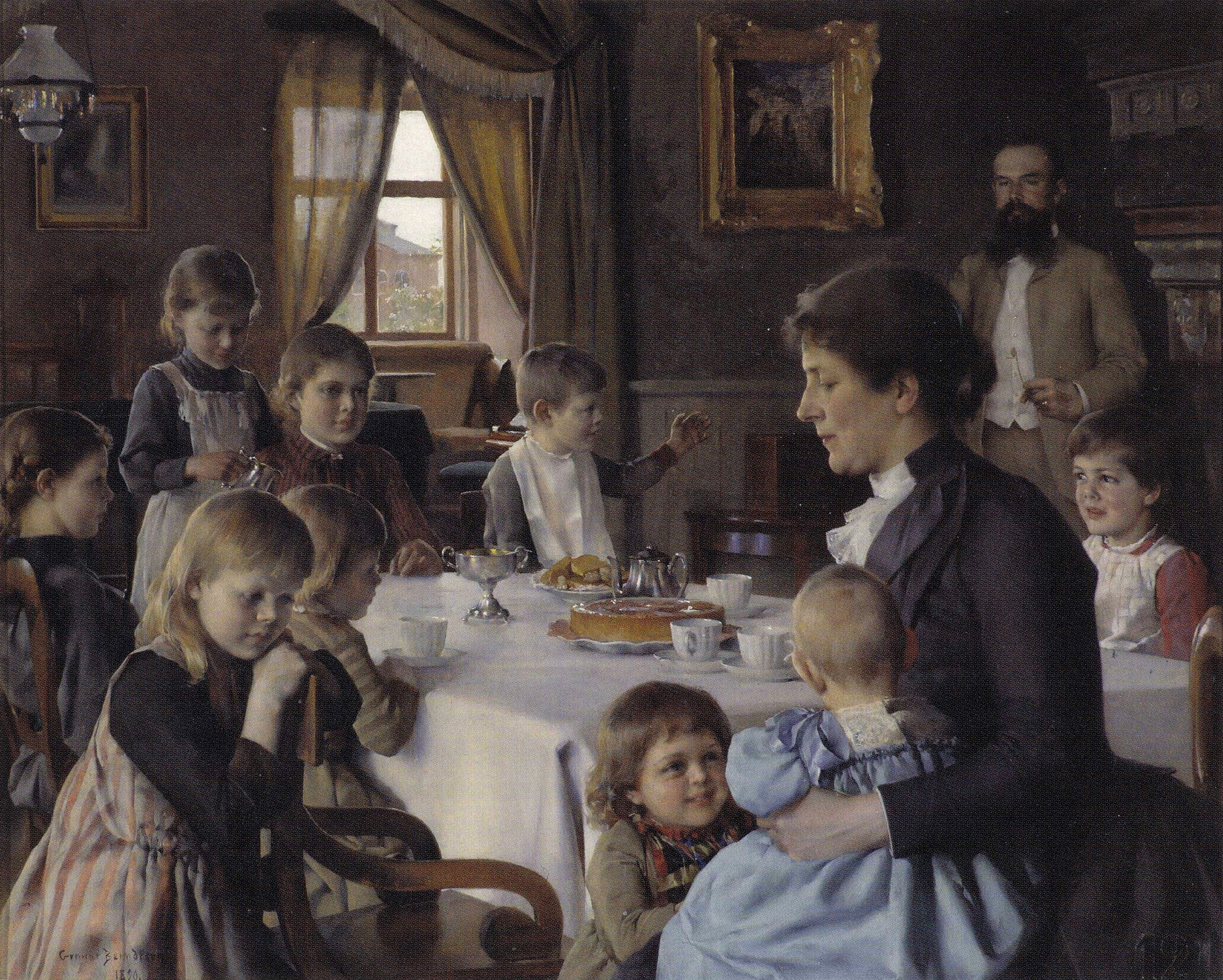
von Born Family, Gunnar Berndtson, 1890

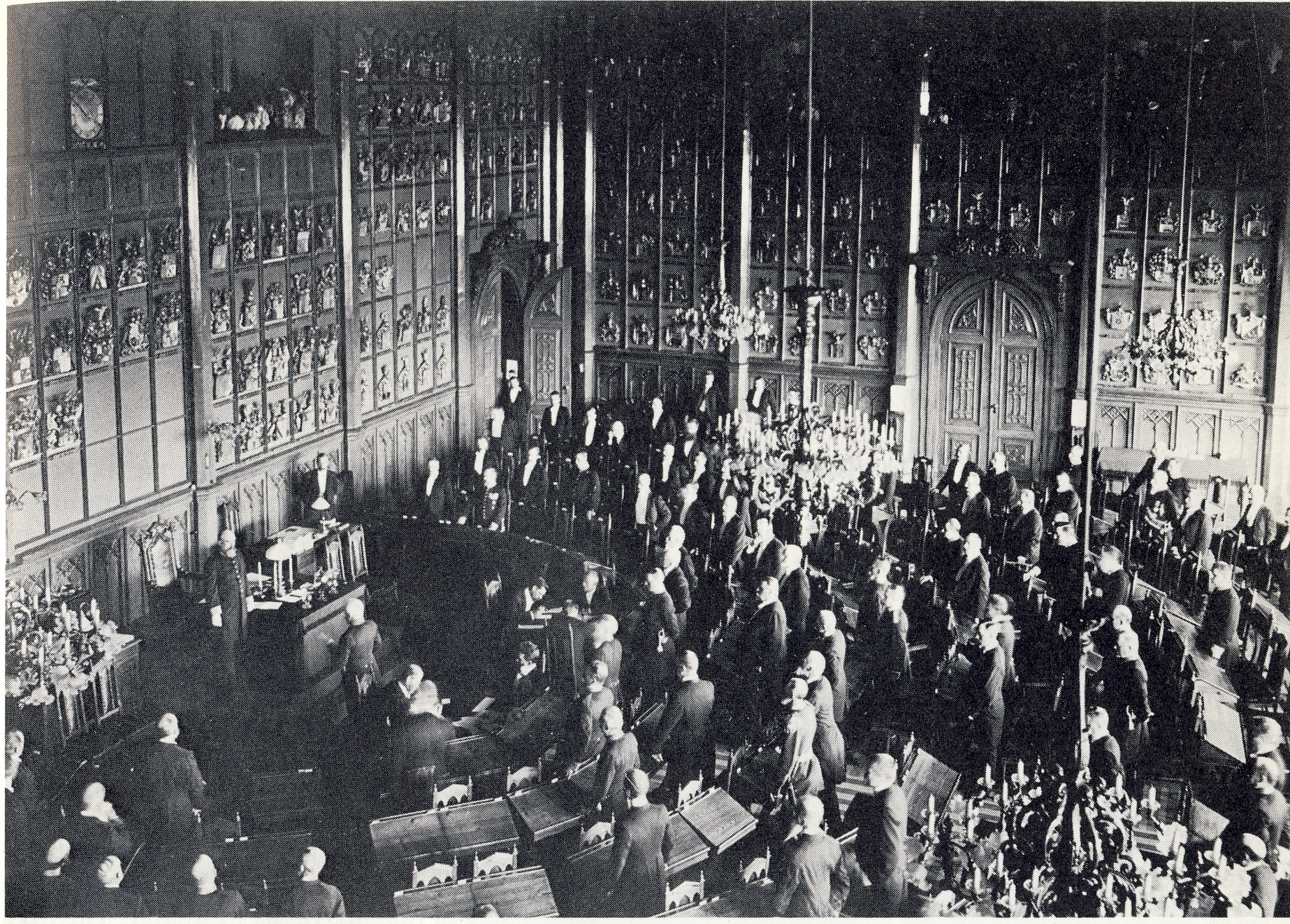
Speaking at the last meeting of the Finnish noble estate at Ritarihuone in 1906

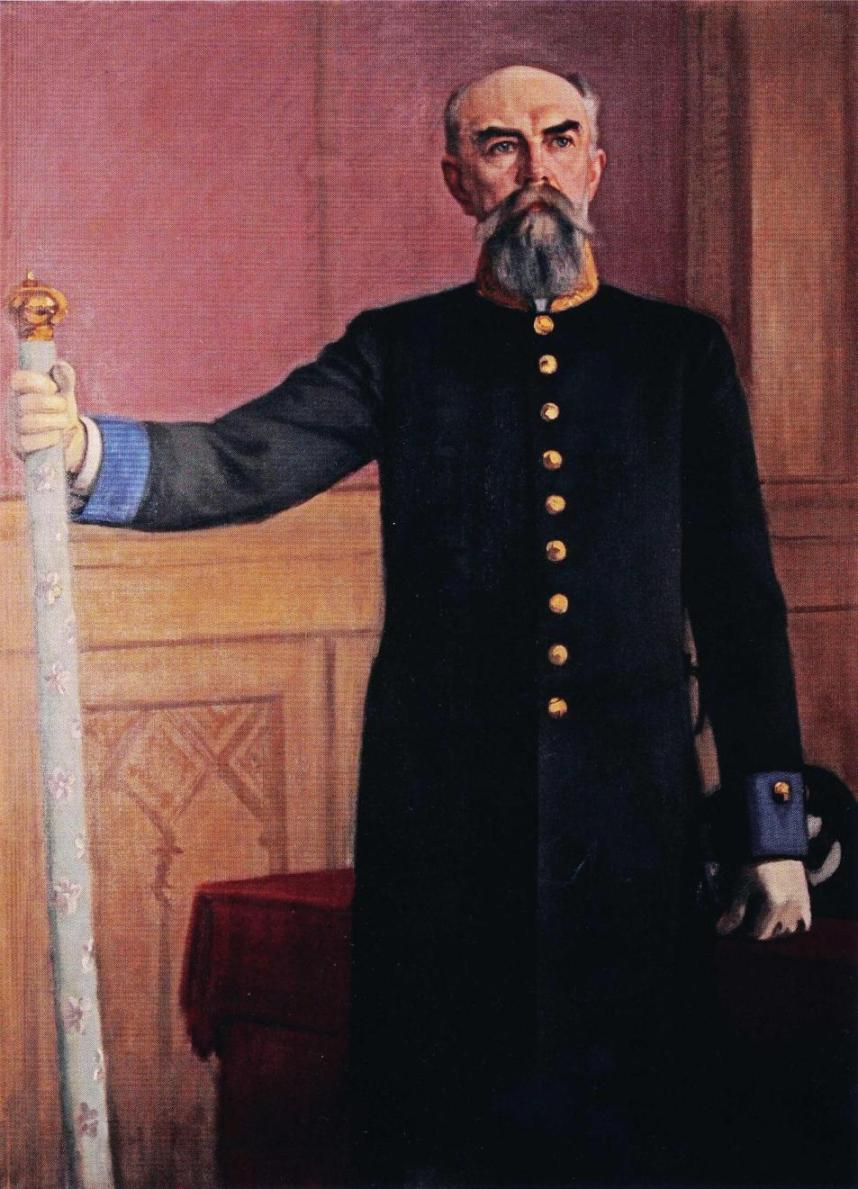
Portrait by Eero Järnefelt, 1907

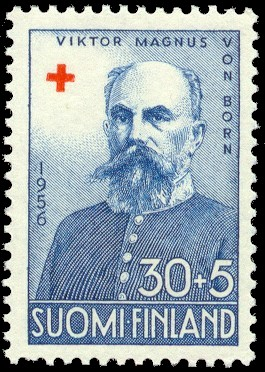
Postage stamp from 1956
