= Borgåbladet =

Former newspaper in Finland

- Type: Newspaper
- Owner(s): Konstsamfundet, Bonnier News
- Publisher: KSF Media
- Editor-in-chief: Helén Kurri (2024-)
- Founded: 1860
- Language: Swedish
- Headquarters: Porvoo, Finland
- Website: https://www.bbl.fi/

Borgåbladet is a Swedish-language newspaper that is published two times a week from the town of Porvoo (Swedish: Borgå) in Finland. It is the third oldest newspaper in Finland. The editor-in-chief has been Helén Kurri since 2024.

== History and profile ==
Borgåbladet was founded in 1860. The paper, published in Swedish, was owned by a foundation, Konstsamfundet. Its publisher is the KSF Media which also publishes Västra Nyland and Hufvudstadsbladet. KSF Media also published Östra Nyland, Hangötidningen and Loviisan Sanomat. In June 2024 Konstsamfundet announced that it is selling a major part of KSF Media to Swedish Bonnier News. Bonnier News became the majority shareholder of KSF Media with 51% of shares owned.

Borgåbladet was originally published five times per week with its headquarters in Porvoo.

The circulation of Borgåbladet was 9,020 copies in 1996. The paper had a circulation of 7,798 copies in 2010 and 7,523 copies in 2011.

In January 2015, Borgåbladet and Östra Nyland were amalgamated into the new newspaper Östnyland. In April 2024 Östnyland announced that it has changed its name back to Borgåbladet.

== See also ==
- List of Swedish-language newspapers
