= Iso Vasikkasaari =

Island in Espoo, Finland

Coordinates: 60°8′24″N 24°45′40″E

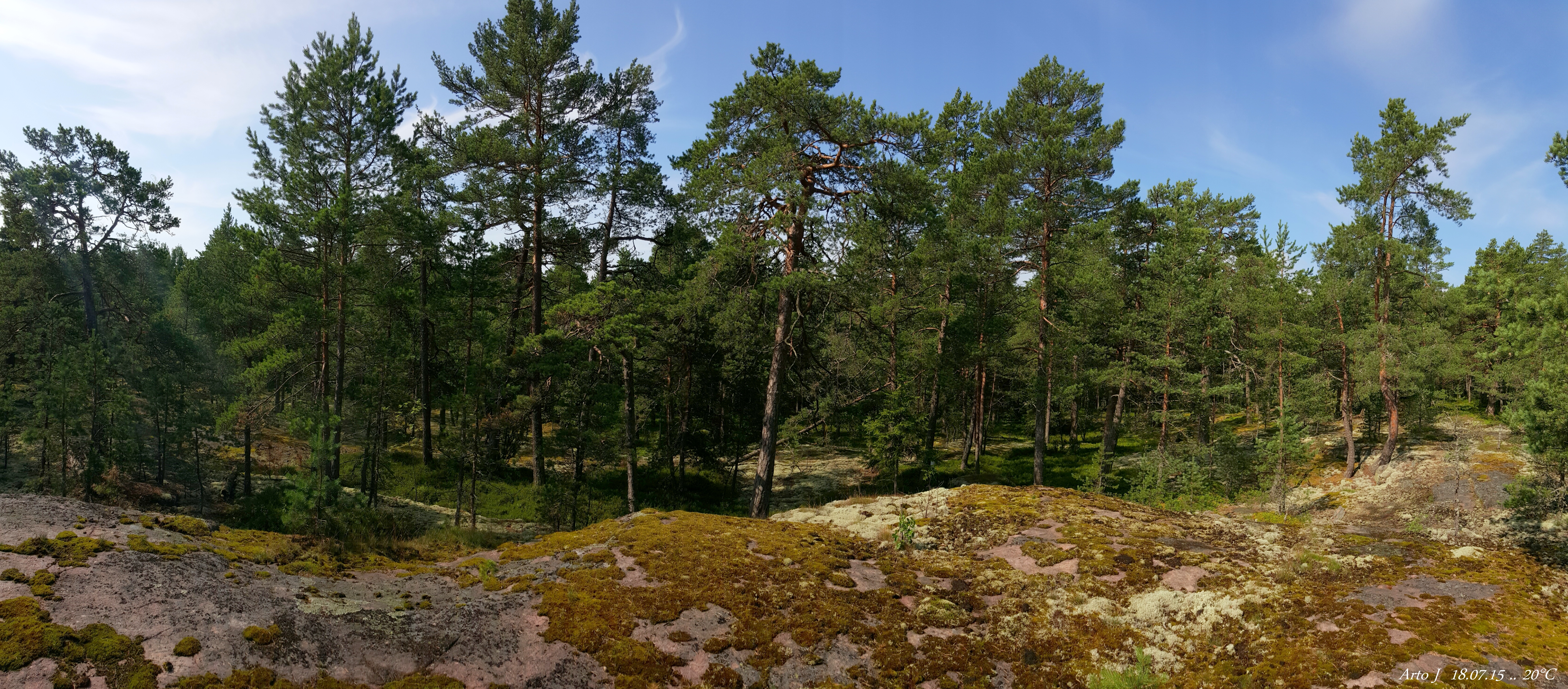
Nature on Iso Vasikkasaari.

Iso Vasikkasaari is one of the outdoor islands in Espoo, Finland. It is located about a kilometre east-southeast from the Nuottaniemi boat harbour in Matinkylä. The island is officially part of Matinkylä, the shortest distance between the island and the continent is less than half a kilometre. A distinctive feature of the island is its local nomenclature related to ancient Greece that is located in private area of the island. Visitors can reach the island by scheduled public boats from harbours in Haukilahti, Nokkala and Suomenoja during summer season (May-September) - schedules and timetables are updated at Visit Espoo official tourist information website.

== Geography ==
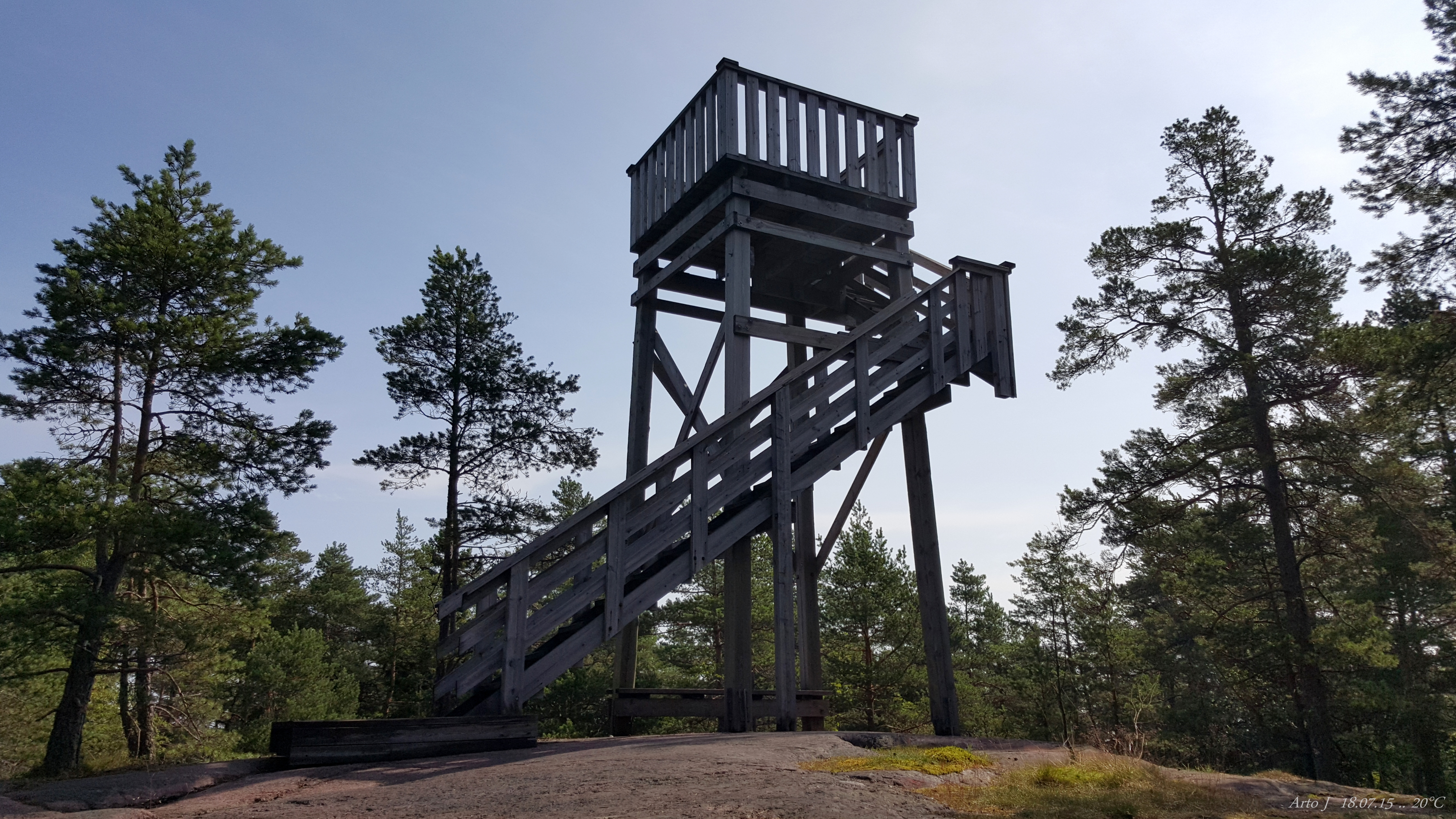
The wooden viewing tower on Iso Vasikkasaari.

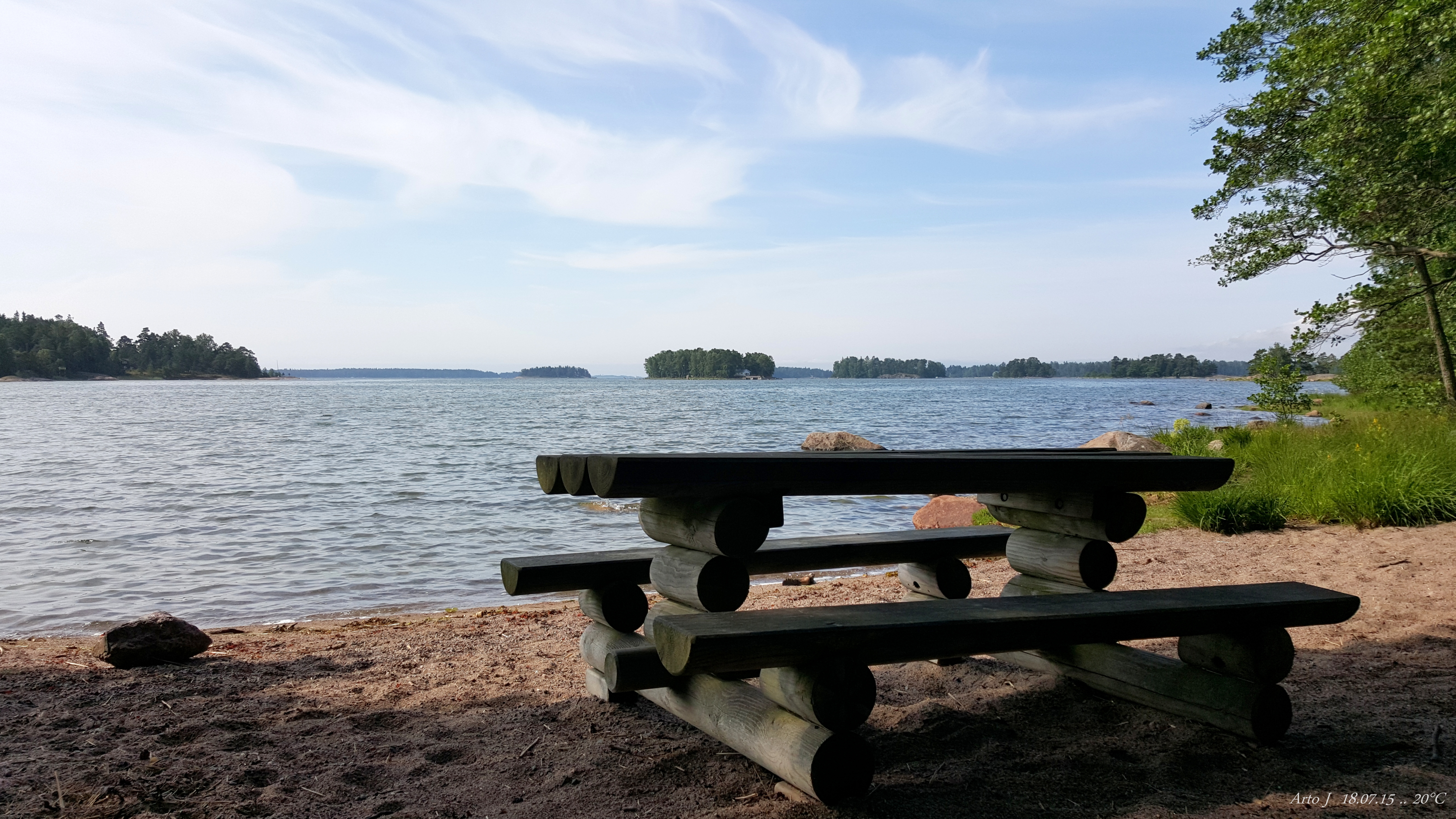
A view of a beach on the island.

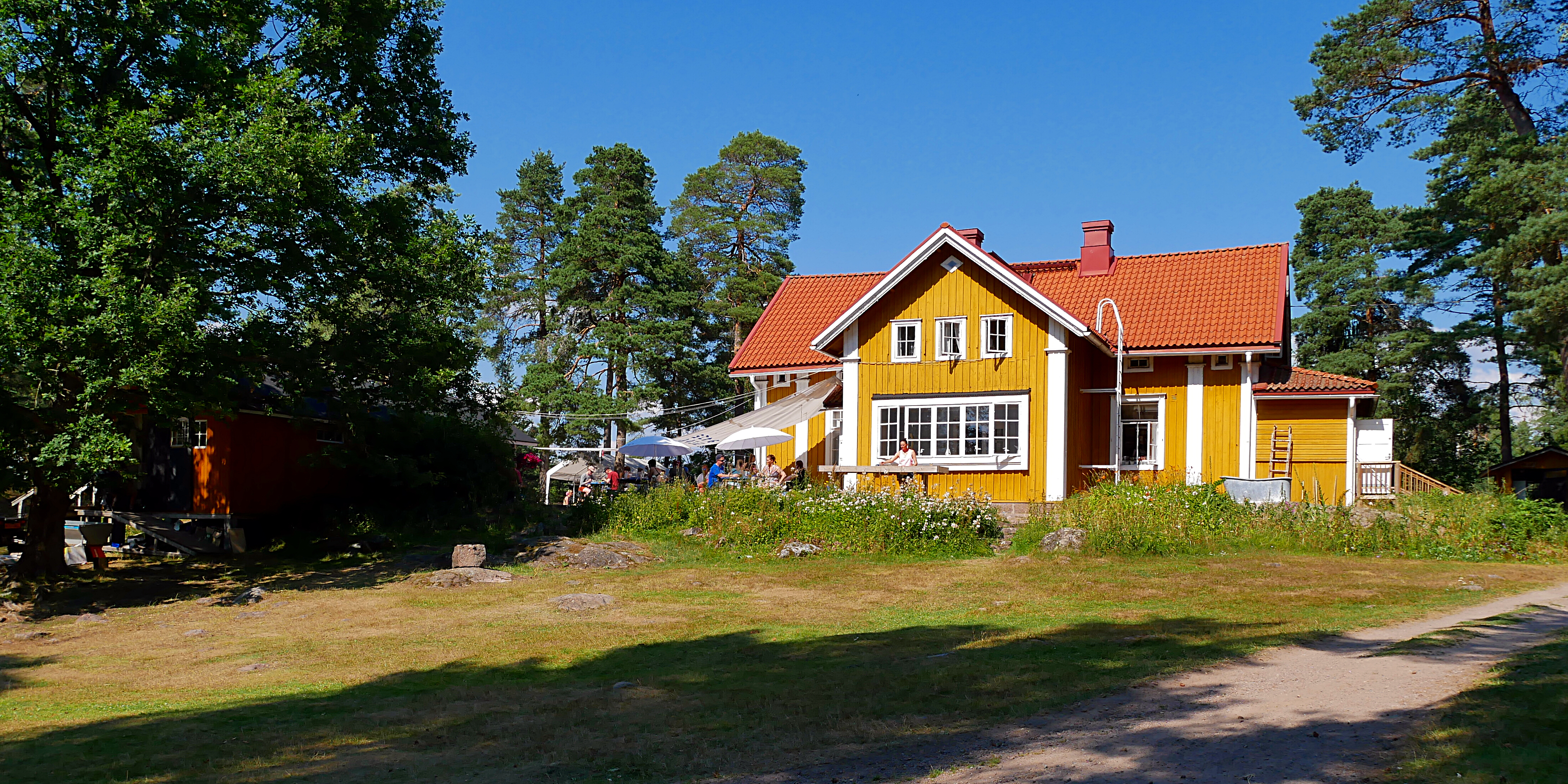
Restaurant Gula villan.

The surface area of Iso Vasikkasaari is about 24 hectares. Except for a private property lot at its northwestern corner, the island is a public outdoor area. The northern part of the island is quite cultured, while the southern part is mostly natural. The nature on the island is quite vivid. Its coast is surrounded by grass and meadows. There are alders growing on the coasts, and going inland on the southern part of the island goes via a hill growing with spruces up to cliffs with lichens on them, growing with pines.

The highest points of Iso Vasikkasaari are over 15 metres above sea level. There is a small grassy field in the middle of the island, east of which is a small public sandy beach at the mouth of the Bastuviken bay. West of this grassy field is an ingrown bay, with a house named Salamis located on its northwestern part. The grassy field is only a few metres above sea level, as is the entire northern part of the island, so the hills of over ten metres in height in the southern part had been islets long before the lowlands in the northern part rose up from the sea.

Iso Vasikkasaari is part of Espoo's inner archipelago. There are two small islands to its north: Buguholm and Pitkäsaari. The island of Pieni Vasikkasaari, known in Swedish as Lilla Kalvholmen, is located to the west of Iso Vasikkasaari. The islands are separated by a narrow strait known as Pavelsons hålet. The name probably comes from an unknown Estonian person named Pavelson. Pieni Vasikkasaari is mostly used for villas. About three hundred metres south-southeast of Iso Vasikkasaari is the island of Pukkisaari. The Norrströmen strait between the islands is named from the Pukkisaari point of view. To the west of the Vasikkasaari islands is the island of Alholmen and a small group of islands known as Kalvholmsklackarna.

== Cultural influences and history ==
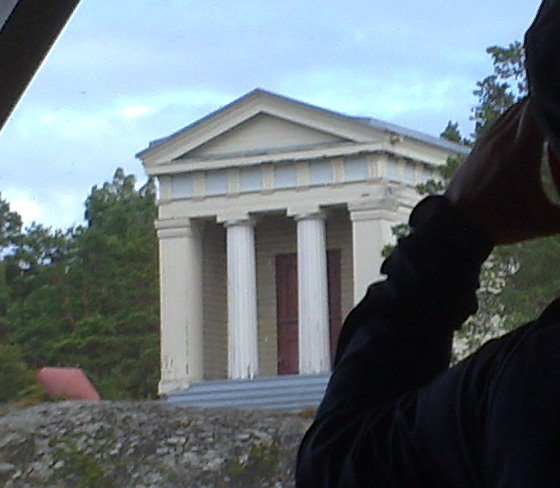
The private villa commissioned by Abdel Landén in the Greek Revival architectural style.

There is a private property lot on the northwestern corner of Iso Vasikkasaari, containing probably the most interesting building in the Espoo archipelago: a villa commissioned by the banker Abel Landén in 1897, with its architecture resembling a temple to Poseidon. There is a quay for public transport boats on the Temppelisalmi coast on the northwestern part of the island. On the western coast there is a former fishing cottage, Gula Villan, currently serving as a restaurant in summer time. There is also a small wooden viewing tower on the island.

There has been fishing population on Iso Vasikkasaari since the late 18th century. Landén bought the island in 1878. It was customary at the time for wealthy people to come to villa islands in early summer along with their servants. There was active social life on the islands. Most of Iso Vasikkasaari was sold to the Nygren family in the early 1920s.

Iso Vasikkasaari is also known as Vasikkasaari and Kalvholmen. The earliest name is Kalvholmen, which has been in use since the 16th century. The name of the island comes from calf ("kalv" in Swedish) pastures. The name of the Salamis islet comes from the late 19th century, inspired by ancient Greek history. The islet is named after the much larger Salamis Island on the Aegean sea.
