= Hanasaari, Espoo =

Island in Espoo, Finland

Coordinates: 60°09.8′N 24°50.1′E

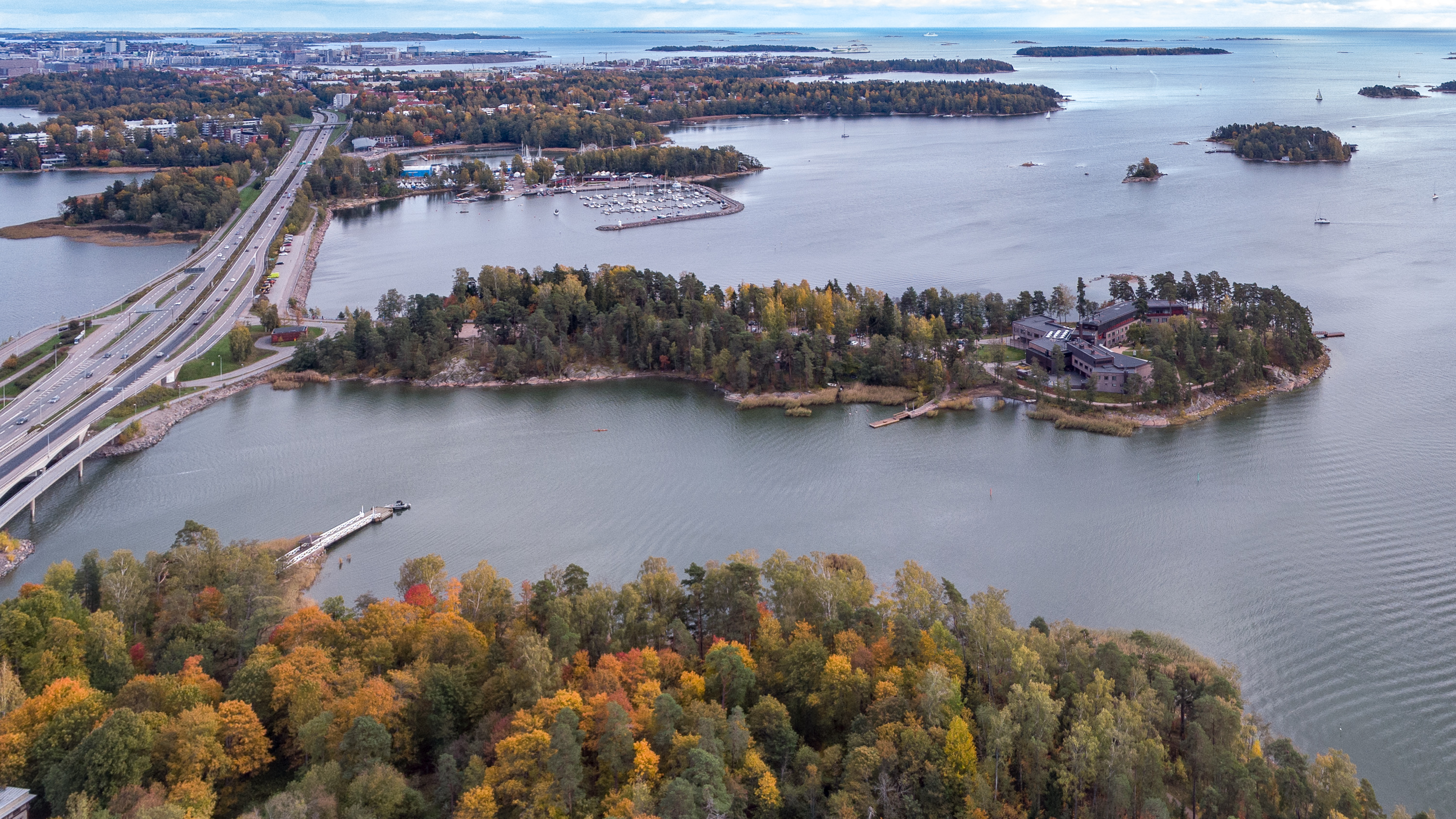
Hanasaari (in the middle) from the air.

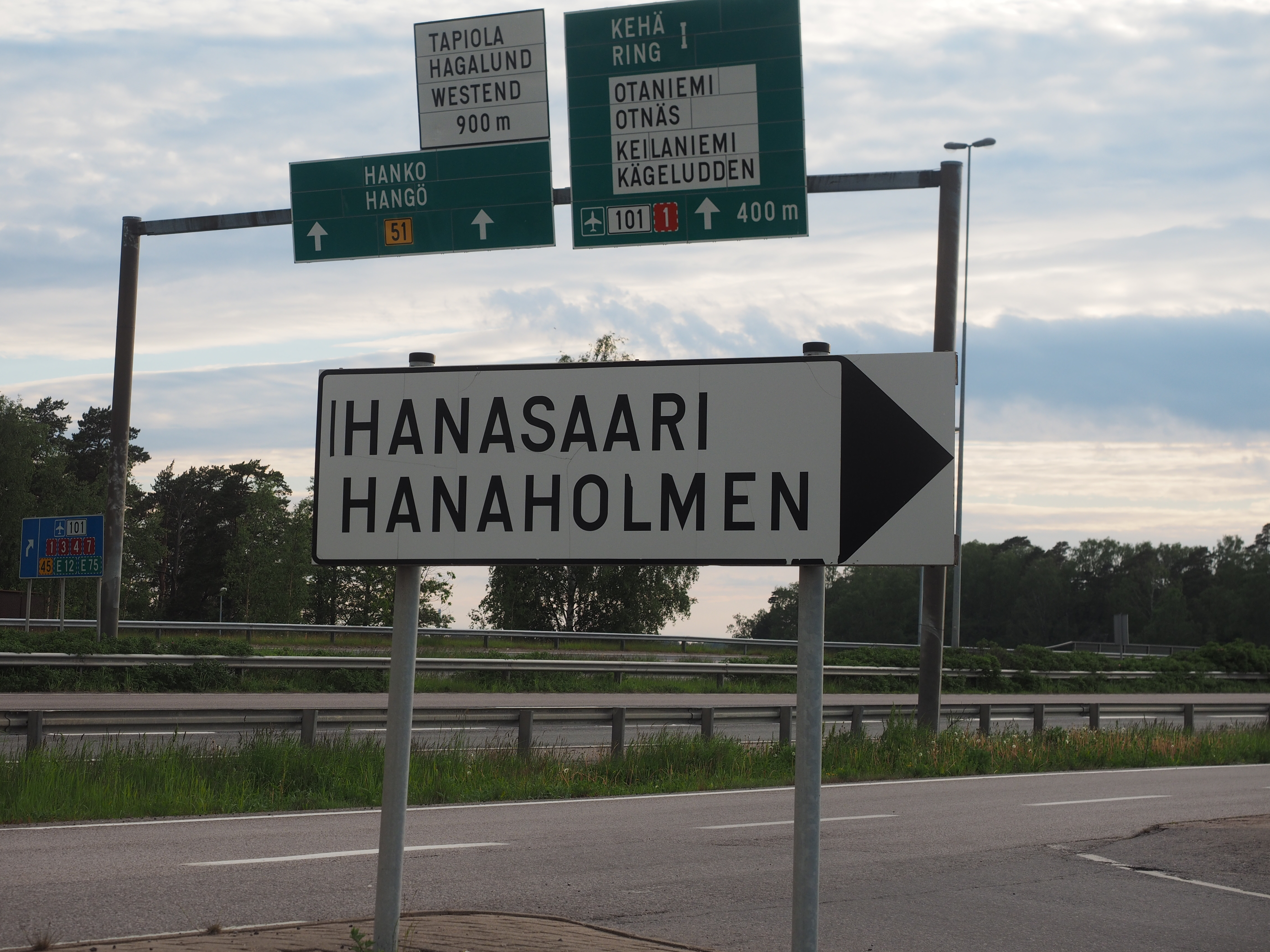
A road sign pointing to Hanasaari, with the name vandalised as "Ihanasaari" (meaning "lovely island" in Finnish).

Hanasaari (Swedish: Hanaholmen) is an island in Espoo, Finland, in the district of Westend, between Lauttasaari and Keilaniemi. The Hanasaari Swedish-Finnish cultural centre with its own hotel is located on the island. This centre was built with the money that Sweden loaned to Finland during World War II and later decided not to collect back. The cultural centre was opened in 1975.

There is a connection from Länsiväylä to the island. The city council of Espoo was worried about the traffic to Hanasaari when the Koivusaari metro station right next to the island, on the Helsinki side, was taken into use.
