= Carl Daniel von Haartman =

Finnish physician (1792–1877)

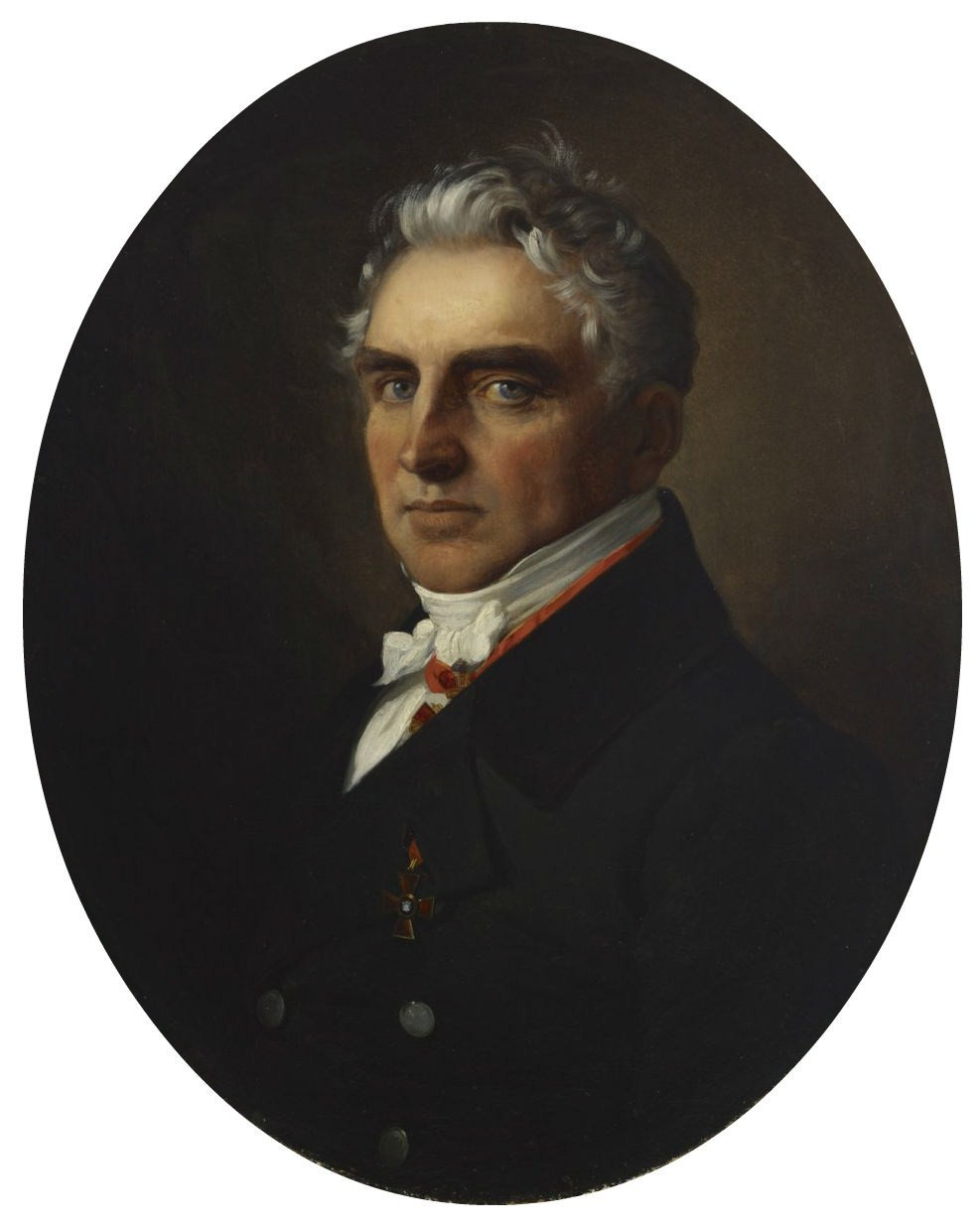
- Born: 5 May 1792; Turku, Kingdom of Sweden
- Died: 15 August 1877 (aged 85); Grand Duchy of Finland
- Occupation: Gynaecologist
- Spouses: Maria Helena Rosina Franzén; Juliana Sofia Ramsay; Emilia Theodora Westzynthius
- Relatives: Lars Gabriel von Haartman (brother)

Carl Daniel von Haartman (5 May 1792 – 15 August 1877) was a Finnish medical doctor and gynaecologist.

Von Haartman was born in Turku, Finland, then part of the Kingdom of Sweden. His father, Gabriel Erik von Haartman (1757–1815), was a physician and statesman. Von Haartman's mother, Fredrika Lovisa von Mell, was the daughter of Lars Henrik von Mell.

Von Haartman served as general director for the Finnish Medicinal Government Agency 1833–1855.

In the 1840s, he published the racially biased Försök att bestämma den genuina racen af de i Finland boende folk, som tala finska ("Acta Societatis scientiarum Fennicæ", in 1845).
