= Östra Nyland =

Former newspaper in Finland

- Owner: KSF Media
- Founder: Viktor Magnus von Born
- Editor: Camilla Berggren
- Founded: 1881
- Ceased publication: 2015
- Language: Swedish
- Headquarters: Loviisa, Finland
- Website: on.fi

Östra Nyland (meaning "Eastern Nyland" in English) was a Swedish-language newspaper published in Loviisa in Finland.

== History and profile ==
The newspaper was founded in 1881, and it was the world's easternmost Swedish-language newspaper. The paper was owned and published by KSF Media which also publishes Hufvudstadsbladet, Västra Nyland, Hangötidningen, Borgåbladet and Loviisan Sanomat.

Östra Nyland was published three times a week and its headquarters were in Loviisa. The last editor of the paper was Camilla Berggren.

In 1995 Östra Nyland had a circulation of 4,377 copies. The circulation of the paper was 3,533 copies in 2012.

In January 2015, Östra Nyland and Borgåbladet were amalgamated into the new newspaper Östnyland.
