= Hufvudstadsbladet =

Swedish-language newspaper in Finland

- Hufvudstadsbladet front page, 10 June 2011
- Type: Daily newspaper
- Format: Compact
- Owner(s): Föreningen Konstsamfundet Association
- Publisher: KSF Media
- Editor: Kalle Silfverberg (since 2023)
- Founded: 1864; 161 years ago
- Language: Swedish
- Headquarters: Helsinki
- Circulation: 36,719 (2014)
- Website: www.hbl.fi

Hufvudstadsbladet (abbr. HBL) is the highest-circulation Swedish-language newspaper in Finland. Its headquarters is located in Helsinki, the capital of Finland. The name of the newspaper translates approximately into "Journal of the Capital", hufvudstad (modern spelling huvudstad) being the 19th-century Swedish spelling for capital. The newspaper is informally also called Husis or Höblan.

== History and profile ==
Hufvudstadsbladet was founded by in 1864, and the first edition was published on 5 December the same year. The founder was August Schauman. During the late 19th century, the paper was the highest-circulation newspaper in Finland.

In 1920 the company Hufvudstadsbladets Förlag och Tryckeri AB was founded to operate the newspaper. The company's principal owner and chief executive officer was Amos Anderson, who would also serve as editor-in-chief of the newspaper between 1922 and 1936. Konstsamfundet (approx. The Art Foundation), founded by Andersson in 1940, took over ownership of Hufvudstadsbladet in 1945, and has wholly owned the newspaper since. Anna Kaila Snellman, a contributor of the paper, visited Italy in the late 1930s as a guest of the Fascist government, and the paper was asked by the Italians to publish articles in favor of the Fascist rule.

Hufvudstadsbladet has an independent and liberal stance. It is owned by Foreningen Konstsamfundet Association and is published by the KSF Media Group. The group also publishes Västra Nyland, Östra Nyland, Hangötidningen, Borgåbladet and Loviisan Sanomat.

One of the significant interviews published in Hufvudstadsbladet was with the Swedish Prime Minister Olof Palme in December 1984. In response to a question Palme stated that Swedish people would choose the Social Democratic Party in the next election because it represented the traditional policy of neutrality unlike the other parties in Sweden. His remarks caused tension in Sweden, and the Swedish paper, Svenska Dagbladet, republished the interview and argued that Olof Palme should resign due to his answer.

In the Spring of 2004 Hufvudstadsbladet changed its format from broadsheet to tabloid. In the same year it became Finland's tenth highest circulating newspaper.

In 2006 Hufvudstadsbladet was named Europe's Best Newspaper and awarded European Newspaper Award in the category of local paper plus.

A weekly supplement called Vision (television and radio programming information) was distributed with the newspaper on Thursdays. From August 2006 to May 2010 HBL also published a full-colour weekly magazine called Volt with focus on lifestyle, features and photography. During its existence Volt was awarded more than 30 design prizes, much thanks to the visionary skills of AD Jesper Vuori.

In January 2014 Hufvudstadsbladet started a digital evening edition, HBL Kväll, which is updated daily at 4 pm.

The newspaper is a member of MIDAS (European Association of Daily Newspapers in Minority and Regional Languages).

== Circulation ==
In 1900 Hufvudstadsbladet had a circulation of 17,500 copies. However, in the 1920s its circulation fell behind Helsingin Sanomat and the gap between them continued in favor of the latter.

In 1996 the circulation of Hufvudstadsbladet was 59,206 copies. The paper had a circulation of 36,719 copies in 2014.
