= Svenska Kulturfonden =

Finnish foundation promoting the Swedish language

Svenska kulturfonden, or officially Stiftelsen för utbildning och kultur på svenska i Finland sr., is a Finnish foundation founded to promote Swedish language, Swedish-speaking culture in Finland and education. The core mission of the foundation is to promote Finland as a bilingual country by contributing financial aid to things such as arts and non-profit organisations that in turn promote the Swedish-speaking culture and Swedish language in Finland.

Mikaela Nylander has been the chairperson of the foundation since February 2020. Svenska Kulturfonden was founded in 1908 (118 years ago) and as of today functions as an umbrella organization for around 490 individual foundations. The foundation's owner is Svenska litteratursällskapet i Finland, that manages the foundation's properties and assets, and it is very close to the Swedish People's Party. The party is the founder of Svenska Kulturfonden and nominates the board of the foundation.

The foundation's contributions amount to approx. 36 million euros annually and it receives close to 8000 applications. In March 2020 the foundation launched a new type of grant for artists hit by the COVID-19 pandemic.
