= Hanasaari Swedish-Finnish cultural centre =

Cultural centre in Hanasaari, Espoo, Finland

Coordinates: 60°09′50.2″N 24°50′11.5″E

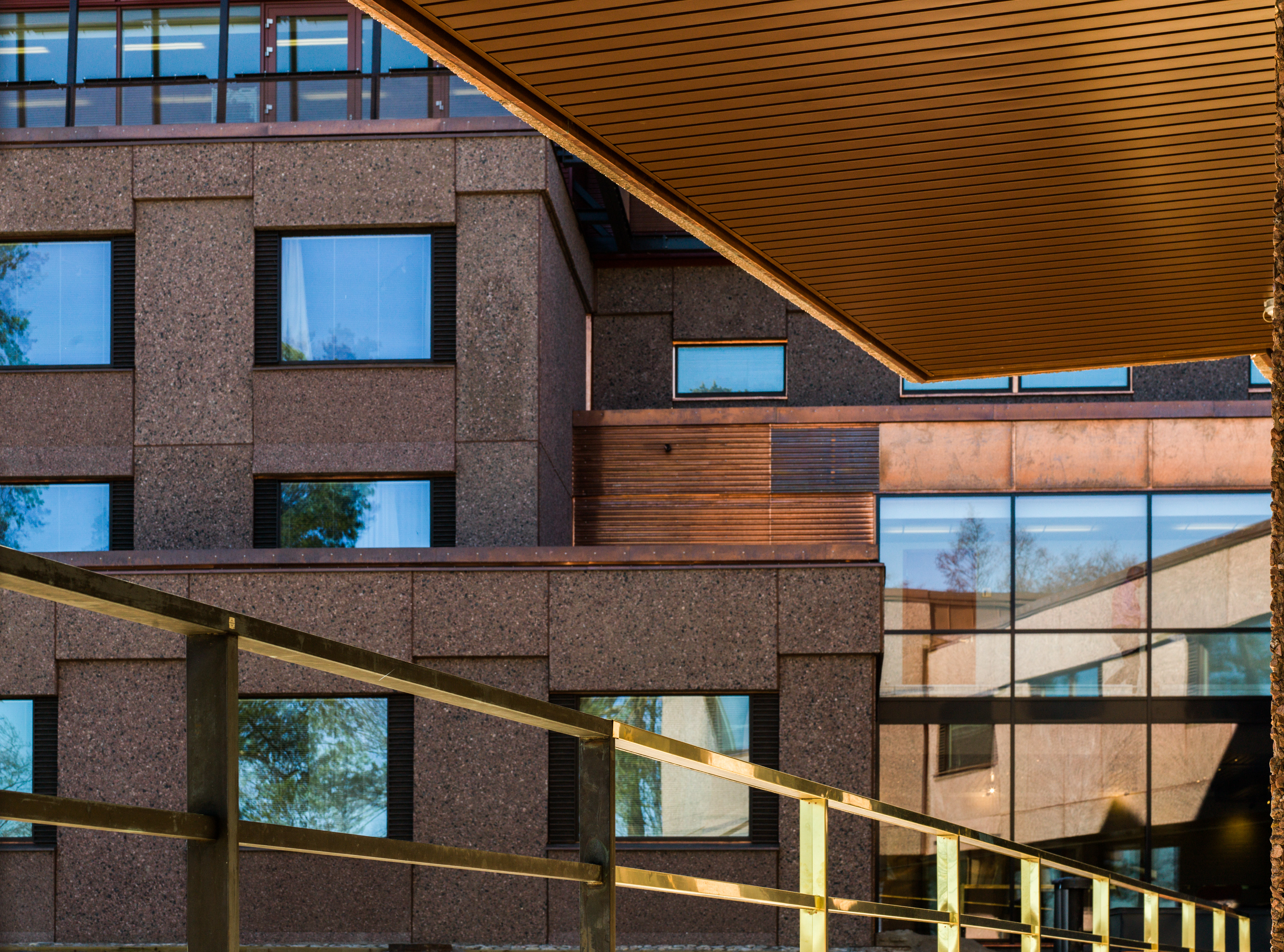
Exterior of the cultural centre.

The Hanasaari Swedish-Finnish cultural centre (Finnish: Hanasaari - ruotsalais-suomalainen kulttuurikeskus, Swedish: Hanaholmens Kulturcentrum för Sverige och Finland) is a cultural centre in Hanasaari, Espoo, Finland, owned by the Finnish state and maintained by the Finnish-Swedish culture fund. As well as the cultural centre, Hanasaari has a hotel, conference spaces and a restaurant. Gunvar Kronman has worked as the director of the cultural centre since 2003.

== Function ==
The function of Hanasaari is to propagate the cooperation between Finland and Sweden in the areas of culture, education, society and business. It functions as a provoker of societal discussion and offers a place for international cooperation. It is visited by tens of thousands of visitors every year.

== Hanasaari in a nutshell ==
The Hanasaari cultural centre functions under supervision of the Finnish-Swedish culture fund. The cultural centre has two areas of function: program activities and conference hotel. The administrative premises of the culture fund are also located in Hanasaari.

The Hanasaari cultural centre also supervises the functions of bilateral culture fund activity towards Norway, Denmark and Iceland.

The activity of the cultural centre is supervised by a board of directors elected for a three-year term, of which five members are from Sweden and five from Finland. Of the Finnish members, one is the chairman of the board, appointed by the Finnish Minister of Culture; other members are appointed by the Finnish-Swedish culture fund. The chairman of the board from 2013 to 2015 was Member of Parliament Kimmo Sasi.

The Hanasaari cultural centre was inaugurated by King of Sweden Carl XVI Gustaf and President of Finland Urho Kekkonen on 1 June 1975. The architect of the building was Veikko Malmio and the interior was designed by professor Yrjö Sotamaa. King Carl XVI Gustaf and President of Finland Sauli Niinistö reinaugurated the building after its renovation on 1 June 2017 with Queen of Denmark Margrethe II, King of Norway Harald V and President of Iceland Guðni Thorlacius Jóhannesson in attendance as part of the 100th anniversary of independent Finland.

== Chairmen of the board and directors of the Hanasaari cultural centre ==
Chairmen of the board

- Kalervo Siikala 1973 - 1993
- Mirja Saari 1994 - 2003
- Esko Aho 2004 - 2008
- Kimmo Sasi 2009 - present

Directors

- Pär Stenbäck 1974 - 1985
- Ann Sandelin 1985 - 1990
- Anna-Maija Marttinen 1991 - 2003
- Gunvor Kronman 2003 - present

== Hanasaari in figures ==
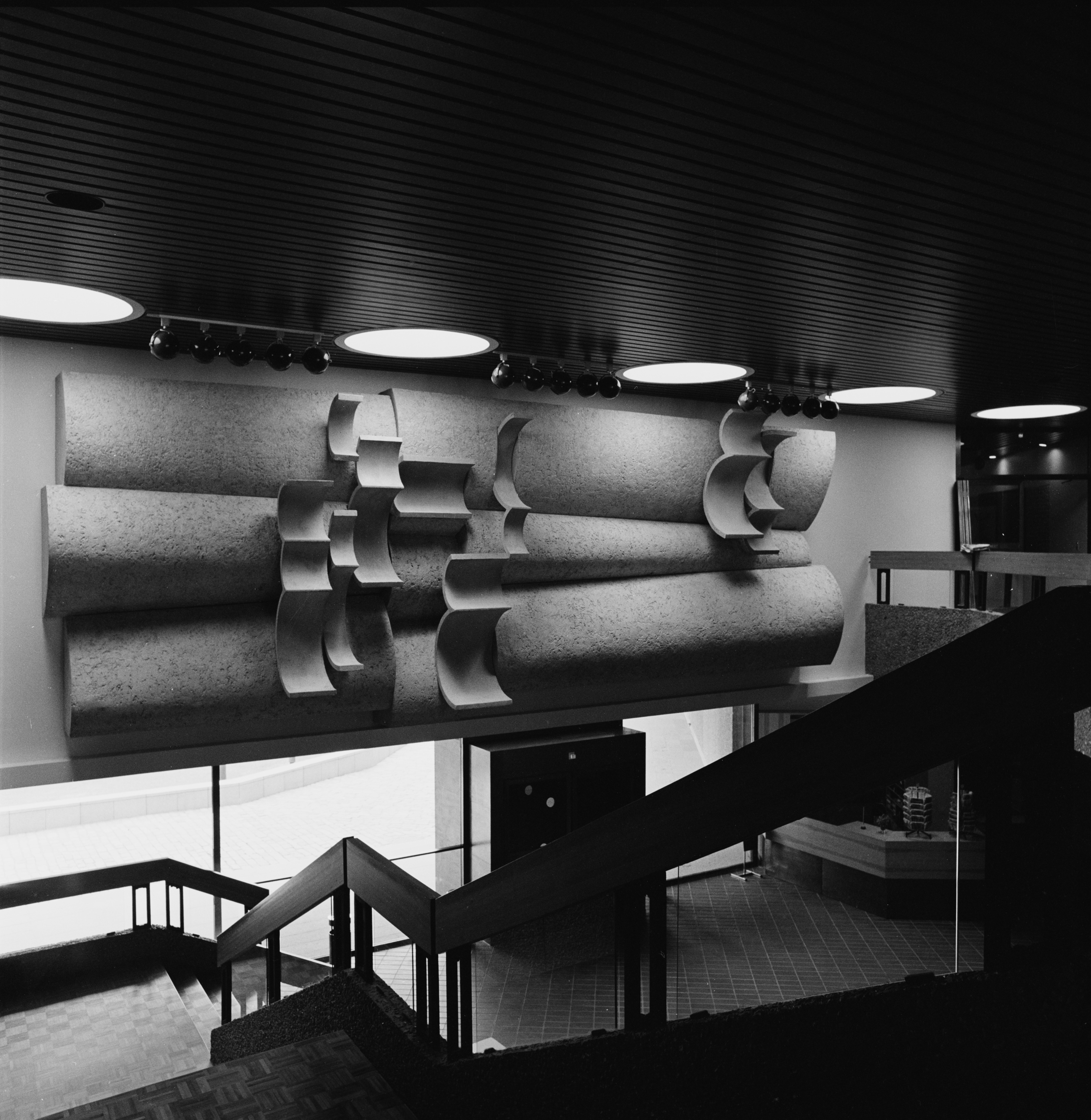
The relief Vuorovaikutus ("Interaction") by Heikki Häiväoja at the main lobby of the building.

- 100 own events, with 14 thousand participants per year
- 60 thousand conference and hotel guests per year
- about 60 employees
- conference rooms from 2 to 231 people
- 66 hotel rooms
- 2 suites
- restaurant with 240 places, summer terrace
- 1.2 km of own coastline
- 244 artworks
