= Order of precedence in Finland =

Relative preeminence of officials for ceremonial purposes

The Finnish order of precedence is a nominal and symbolic hierarchy of important positions within the government of Finland. It has no legal standing, it does not reflect the Finnish presidential line of succession or the co-equal status of the branches of government under the constitution, and is only used to indicate ceremonial protocol.

1. President of the Republic Alexander Stubb
2. Retired Presidents of the Republic in order of term:
  1. President Tarja Halonen
  2. President Sauli Niinistö
3. Speaker of the Parliament Jussi Halla-aho
4. Prime Minister Petteri Orpo
5. Other ministers of the Finnish Government in order of minister experience
  1. Deputy Prime Minister, Minister of Finance Riikka Purra
  2. Minister of Defence Antti Häkkänen
  3. Minister of Agriculture and Forestry Sari Essayah
  4. Minister for Foreign Affairs Elina Valtonen
  5. Minister of Justice Leena Meri
  6. Minister for Foreign Trade and Development Ville Tavio
  7. Minister of Education Anders Adlercreutz
  8. Minister of Climate and the Environment Sari Multala
  9. Minister of Transport and Communications Lulu Ranne
  10. Minister of Local and Regional Government Anna-Kaisa Ikonen
  11. Minister of the Interior Mari Rantanen
  12. Minister of Social Affairs and Health Wille Rydman
  13. Minister for European Affairs and Ownership Steering Joakim Strand
  14. Minister of Science and Culture Mari-Leena Talvitie
  15. Minister of Employment Matias Marttinen
  16. Minister of Economic Affairs Sakari Puisto
  17. Minister of Youth, Sport and Physical Activity Mika Poutala
  18. Minister of Social Security Karoliina Partanen
6. President of the Supreme Court Tatu Leppänen
7. President of the Supreme Administrative Court Kari Kuusiniemi
8. Chief of Defence Janne Jaakkola
9. Chancellor of Justice Tuomas Pöysti
10. Archbishop of Turku Tapio Luoma
11. Chancellor of the Order of the Cross of Liberty Ari Puheloinen
12. Chancellor of the Order of the White Rose of Finland and the Order of the Lion of Finland Jussi Nuorteva
13. Chancellor of the University of Helsinki Kaarle Hämeri
