= 2021 Finns Party leadership election =

- 13–14 August 2021
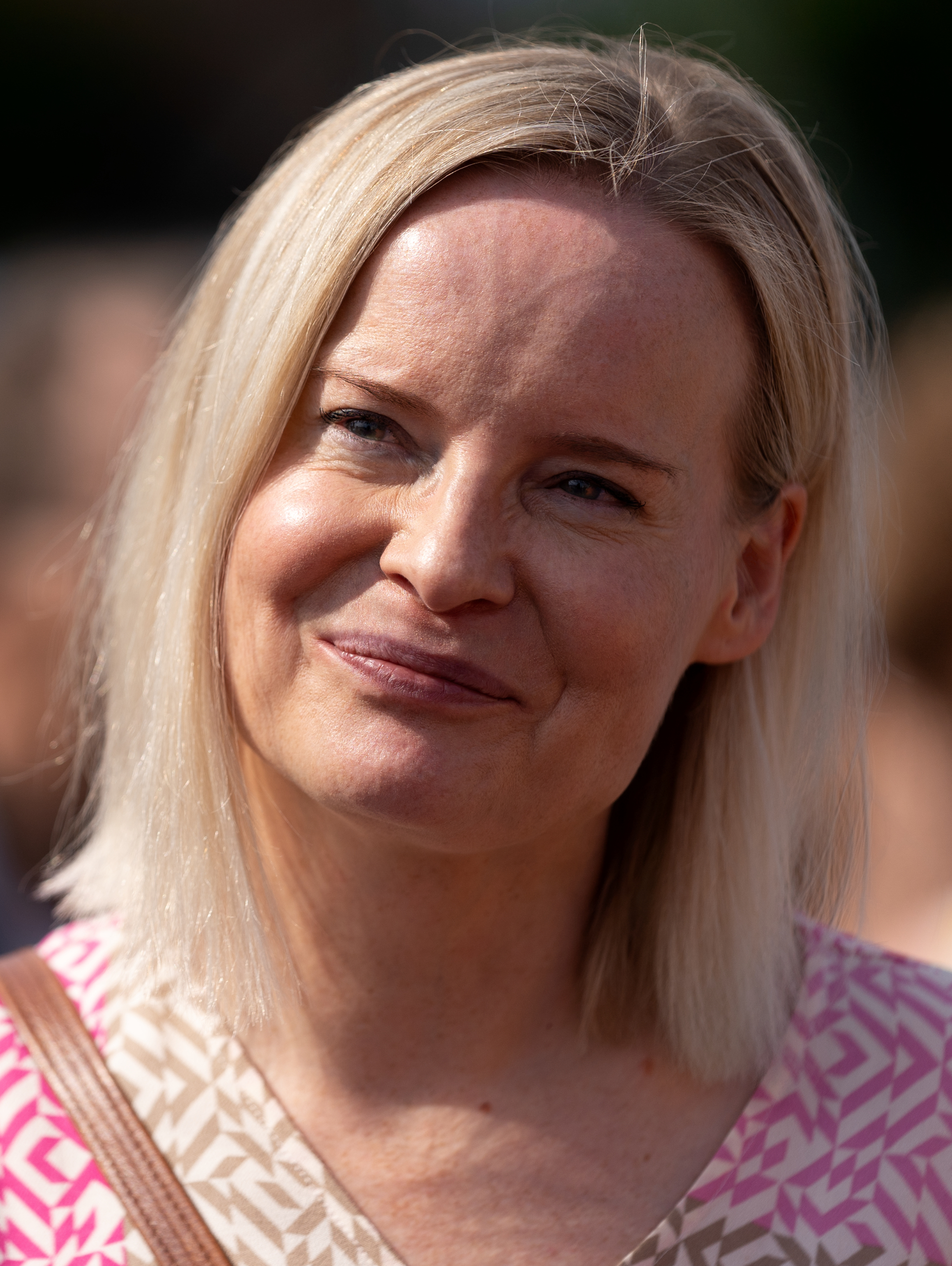

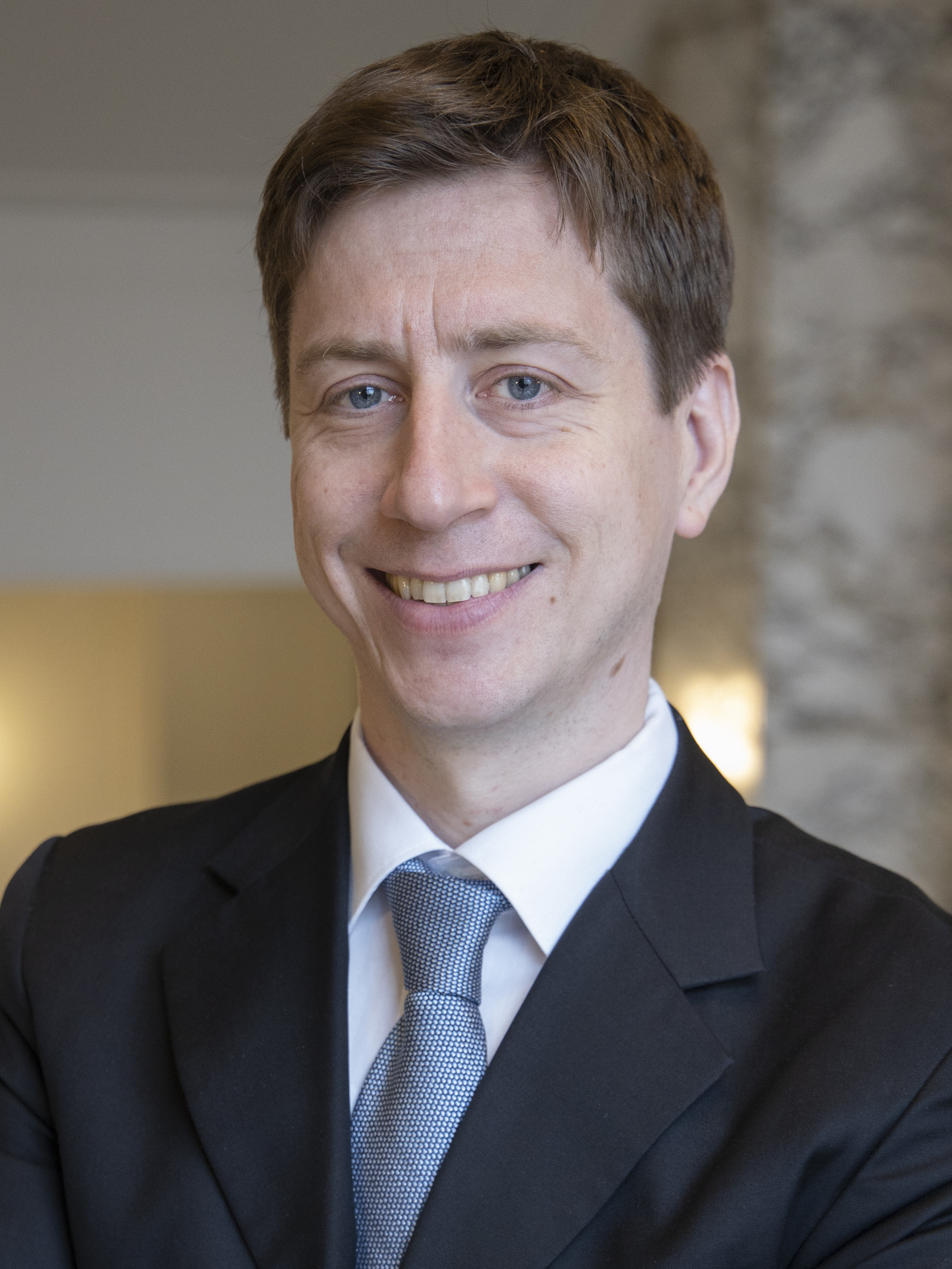

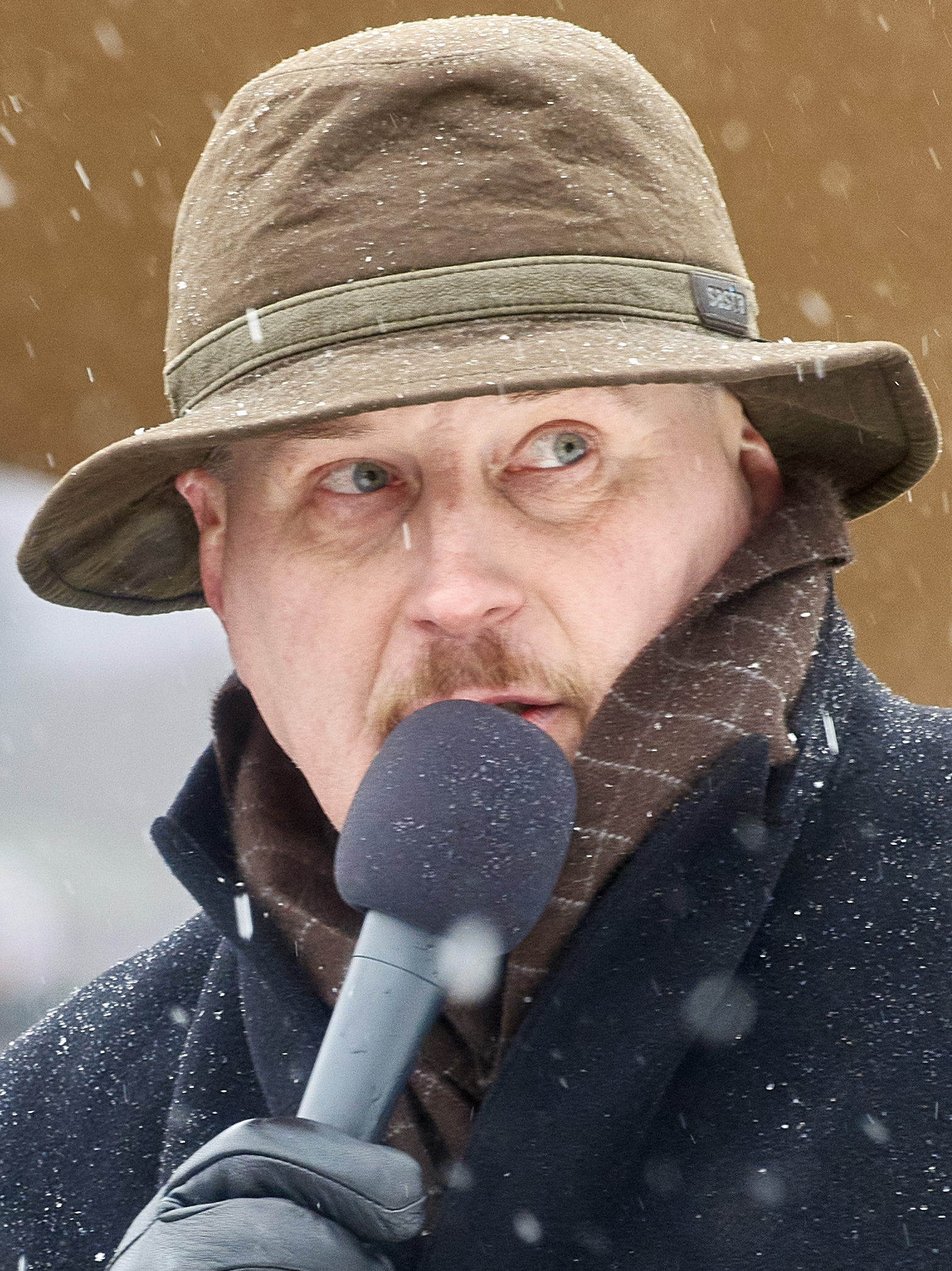
Candidate	Riikka Purra	Sakari Puisto	Ossi Tiihonen
Popular vote	774	252	181
Percentage	63.76%	20.76%	14.91%
Previous leader of the Finns Party
Jussi Halla-aho
Elected leader of the Finns Party
Riikka Purra

The 2021 Finns Party leadership election (Finnish: Perussuomalaisten puheenjohtajavaalit 2021) was held in Jyväskylä, Finland, on 14 August 2021. All members of the party who had paid their subscription were allowed to vote in the election.

In June 2021, the incumbent party chair, Jussi Halla-aho, who had led the party since 2017, informed that he would not run for re-election as chairman of the party, but would continue his role in parliament and his municipality.

Riikka Purra won the election in the first round, with more than 60% of the vote, avoiding a runoff.

== Candidates ==
- Riikka Purra, MP for Uusimaa
- Sakari Puisto, MP for Pirkanmaa
- Ossi Tiihonen, councillor in Lohja
- Kristiina Ilmarinen, MP candidate for Varsinais-Suomi in 2019, and economist based in Salo

== Opinion polls ==
Poll source	Survey dates					
Poll source	Survey dates	Riikka Purra	Sakari Puisto	Juho Eerola	Vilhelm Junnila	Undecided
Yle poll	17 July 2021	65%	16%	2%	2%	

== Results ==
Riikka Purra was elected party leader, earning 63.76% of valid votes. A few months after the election, in December 2021, Ossi Tiihonen left the Finns and applied to join Power Belongs to the People.

Candidate	Votes	%
Riikka Purra	774	63.76%
Sakari Puisto	252	20.76%
Ossi Tiihonen	181	14.91%
Kristiina Ilmarinen	7	0.58%
Total valid votes	1,214	100.00
Invalid/blank votes	88	6.76
Total votes cast	1,302	100.00

== See also ==
- 2017 Finns Party leadership election
- Politics of Finland
