= Orpo cabinet =

77th cabinet of Finland

Orpo Cabinet
- 77th Cabinet of Finland

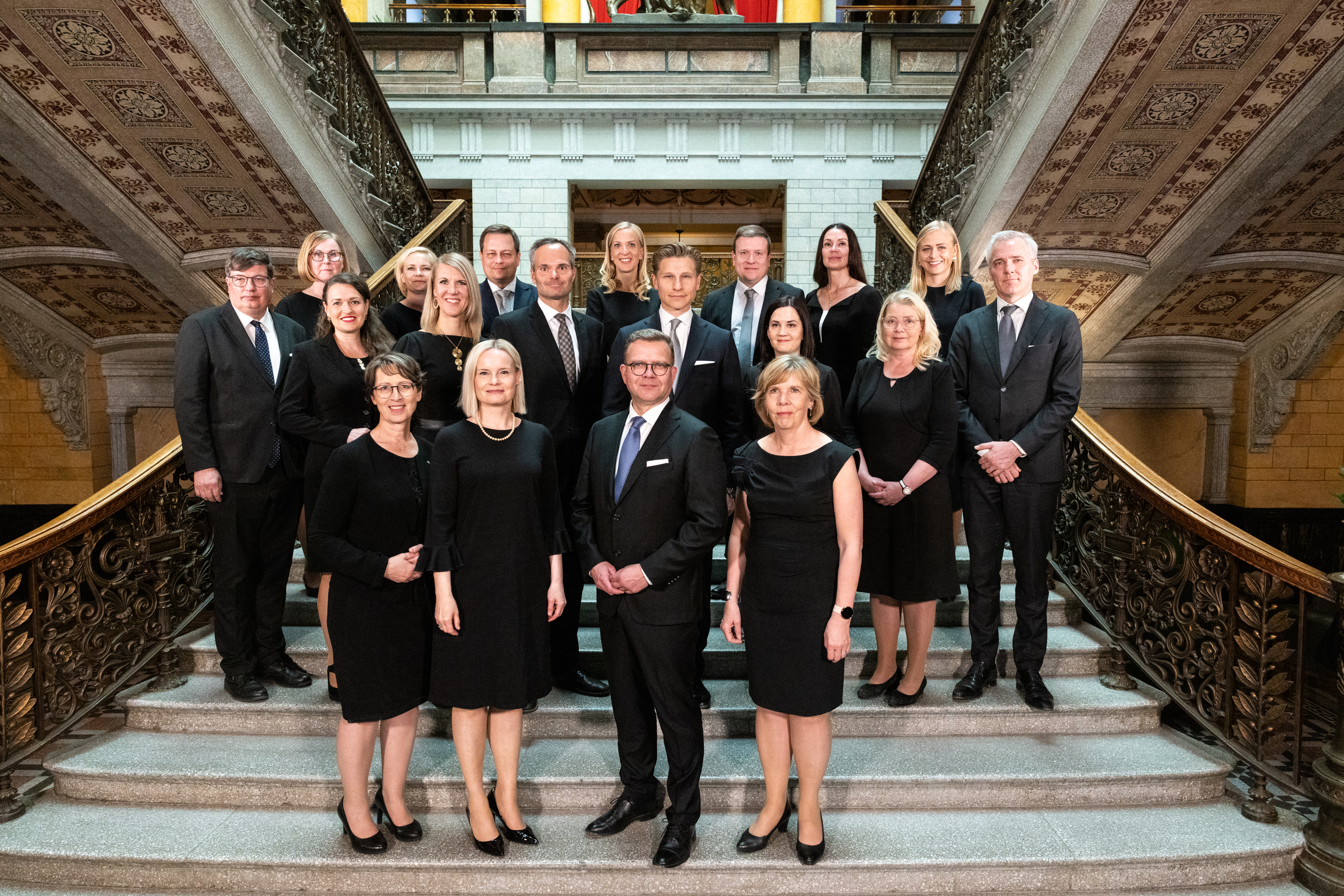
- Date formed: 20 June 2023

People and organisations
- Head of state: Sauli Niinistö; Alexander Stubb
- Head of government: Petteri Orpo
- No. of ministers: 19
- Member parties: National Coalition Party; Finns Party; Swedish People's Party; Christian Democrats
- Status in legislature: Majority coalition
- Opposition parties: Social Democratic Party; Centre Party; Left Alliance; Green League; Movement Now

History
- Election: 2023
- Predecessor: Marin cabinet

Finnish prime minister Petteri Orpo sitting in his office in 2025

The Orpo cabinet is the 77th government of Finland. It was formed following the 2023 Finnish parliamentary election and succeeds the Marin cabinet led by the Social Democrats and was formally appointed by President Sauli Niinistö on 20 June 2023. The cabinet is headed by Petteri Orpo and is a coalition between the National Coalition Party, Finns Party, the Swedish People's Party, and the Christian Democrats.

== Ministers ==
Out of the total 19 ministerial posts, eight ministers are from the National Coalition, seven from the Finns, two from the Swedish People's Party, and two from the Christian Democrats.

| Portfolio | Minister | Took office | Left office | Party |
|---|---|---|---|---|
| Prime Minister | Petteri Orpo | 20 June 2023 | Incumbent | National Coalition |
| Deputy Prime Minister | Riikka Purra | 20 June 2023 | Incumbent | Finns |
| Minister of Finance | Riikka Purra | 20 June 2023 | Incumbent | Finns |
| Minister of Education | Anna-Maja Henriksson | 20 June 2023 | 5 July 2024 | RKP |
| Minister of Education | Anders Adlercreutz | 5 July 2024 | Incumbent | RKP |
| Minister of Agriculture and Forestry | Sari Essayah | 20 June 2023 | Incumbent | KD |
| Minister of Defence | Antti Häkkänen | 20 June 2023 | Incumbent | National Coalition |
| Minister for Development Cooperation and Foreign Trade | Ville Tavio | 20 June 2023 | Incumbent | Finns |
| Minister of Economic Affairs | Vilhelm Junnila | 20 June 2023 | 6 July 2023 | Finns |
| Minister of Economic Affairs | Wille Rydman | 6 July 2023 | 13 June 2025 | Finns |
| Minister of Economic Affairs | Sakari Puisto | 13 June 2025 | Incumbent | Finns |
| Minister of Employment | Arto Satonen | 20 June 2023 | 6 May 2025 | National Coalition |
| Minister of Employment | Matias Marttinen | 6 May 2025 | Incumbent | National Coalition |
| Minister of Climate and the Environment | Kai Mykkänen | 20 June 2023 | 24 January 2025 | National Coalition |
| Minister of Climate and the Environment | Sari Multala | 24 January 2025 | Incumbent | National Coalition |
| Minister of European Affairs and Ownership Steering | Anders Adlercreutz | 20 June 2023 | 5 July 2024 | RKP |
| Minister of European Affairs and Ownership Steering | Joakim Strand | 5 July 2024 | Incumbent | RKP |
| Minister for Foreign Affairs | Elina Valtonen | 20 June 2023 | Incumbent | National Coalition |
| Minister of the Interior | Mari Rantanen | 20 June 2023 | Incumbent | Finns |
| Minister of Justice | Leena Meri | 20 June 2023 | Incumbent | Finns |
| Minister of Local and Regional Government | Anna-Kaisa Ikonen | 20 June 2023 | Incumbent | National Coalition |
| Minister of Science and Culture | Sari Multala | 20 June 2023 | 24 January 2025 | National Coalition |
| Minister of Science and Culture | Mari-Leena Talvitie | 24 January 2025 | Incumbent | National Coalition |
| Minister of Social Affairs and Health | Kaisa Juuso | 20 June 2023 | 20 February 2026 | Finns |
| Minister of Social Affairs and Health | Wille Rydman | 20 February 2026 | Incumbent | Finns |
| Minister of Social Security | Sanni Grahn-Laasonen | 20 June 2023 | 16 June 2026 | National Coalition |
| Minister of Social Security | Karoliina Partanen | 16 June 2026 | Incumbent | National Coalition |
| Minister of Transport and Communications | Lulu Ranne | 20 June 2023 | Incumbent | Finns |
| Minister of Youth, Sport and Physical Activity | Sandra Bergqvist | 20 June 2023 | 13 June 2025 | RKP |
| Minister of Youth, Sport and Physical Activity | Mika Poutala | 13 June 2025 | Incumbent | KD |

== Program ==
Under the coalition deal, the Government has plans to tighten the rules for getting permanent residence and citizenship. Orpo Cabinet is aiming for 100,000 new people to become part of the workforce through, among other things, social security reforms and labor market reforms. The goal is, for example, to reduce the power of trade unions. The government increases funding for research and development and plans investments in rail traffic. In addition, the program aims to tighten Finland's criminal policy.

Riikka Purra, the chair of the Finns Party, justified the party's joining the coalition government by saying that the government program tightens immigration policy and changes Finland's climate policy to be more realistic. Anna-Maja Henriksson, chair of the Swedish People's Party, emphasized that the government will not weaken the position of the Swedish language in Finland. During the government program negotiations, the Swedish People's Party was at odds with the Finns Party on many issues, and Henriksson admitted that it is surprising that the party ended up in the same government as the Finns Party.

Before being elected, the National Coalition Party (NCP) campaigned on balancing public finances. They promised to avoid tax increases on work, arguing instead for spending cuts and structural reforms to boost employment. However, the austerity program implemented faced challenges. The government increased significantly the general value added tax rate from 24% to 25.5% in September 2024, making it the second-highest standard VAT rate in the EU, while the reduced VAT was dropped from 14% to 13.5%. They simultaneously implemented income tax reductions for low- and middle-income earners and committed to lowering the corporate tax rate to 18% by 2027. Despite all these measures, the budget deficit remained high, projected at approximately €12.2 billion for 2025, largely due to increased interest payments and defense spending.

== Controversies ==
=== Junnila's resignation ===
On 27 June 2023, the Green League, Left Alliance, and Social Democratic Party decided to propose a vote of no confidence against Vilhelm Junnila due to his connections to far-right extremism. On 28 June, the Centre Party announced their support for the vote of no confidence. Ahead of the vote, the leader of the Swedish People's Party, Anna-Maja Henriksson, suggested that the Finns could replace Junnila with another person. The suggestion was declined by Riikka Purra, the leader of Finns Party. She had threatened to dissolve the government in a private meeting between the governing political parties' leaders, if Junnila had failed to pass the vote.

In the vote held by the parliament on 28 June 2023, 95 Members of Parliament voted in favor of Junnila, while 86 voted against. Three MPs abstained from voting, and 15 were absent. The vote created a division within the government, as seven MPs of the government coalition partner, the Swedish People's Party, voted against Junnila, and three abstained. Purra commented afterwards that the Swedish People's Party's decision to vote against their minister had "wounded the government" and that similar conduct could not continue in the future.

After the vote, there were further controversies on Junnila's past actions, including his past motion that Finland should promote contraception and "climate abortions" in "the underdeveloped societies of Africa" in order to battle curbing population growth and enhance living conditions on the African continent. The motion was deemed outrageous by another coalition partner, the anti-abortion Christian Democrats. On 30 June 2023, Junnila announced that he would resign. He was succeeded by Wille Rydman on 6 July 2023. Rydman himself became the subject of controversy in July, after private messages were published in which he repeatedly used racist language.

=== Controversy regarding anti-immigration and racist rhetoric ===
In June 2023, it was widely noted in the media that the Minister of the Interior Mari Rantanen, Minister of Justice Leena Meri, Minister for Development Cooperation and Foreign Trade Ville Tavio and Minister of Finance Riikka Purra had repeatedly suggested in parliament and on social media that ethnic Finns were being demographically replaced in Finland through large-scale immigration by the political elite. For example, Rantanen had often used the hashtag: #väestönvaihto (a Finnish equivalent of the Great Replacement) on Twitter. Ahead of the 2023 Finnish parliamentary election, she had also written a brief about her candidacy on her own website in which she remarked on immigration as such: "we must not be so blue-eyed (a Finnish term for "naive") that soon we won't be blue-eyed any longer (a common feature of the ethnic Finnish people)".

According to researcher Niko Pyrhönen, the use of the term "väestönvaihto" is not an accident, but a very conscious choice, as there are countless other expressions that could be used to talk about the changing population of Finland. The Finnish Security and Intelligence Service considers the Great Replacement conspiracy theory one of the most noteworthy ideological motivators of far-right terrorism.

After a heated discussion on social media, Purra, Meri and Rantanen stated on Twitter that they don't believe in conspiracy theories, stating that they only "…believe in the statistics". Prime Minister Orpo commented the controversy by saying that the usage of the word "väestönvaihto" was not enough to shake his confidence in any minister and instead called for more understanding of the context in which the word had been said in.

=== Harassment of journalists ===
On 2 July 2023, Ida Erämaa, journalist of Iltalehti, published a column, in which she criticized the Finns Party politicians for trying to prevent the media from writing about the party's connections to right-wing extremism. Afterwards, Erämaa was subjected to a large-scale harassment campaign on social media, with many comments focusing on Erämaa's persona and private life. Among the bunch were certain politicians from the governing parties, including MPs Sebastian Tynkkynen, Wille Rydman from the Finns and Tere Sammallahti from the NCP. Erämaa was supported by the Union of Journalists in Finland and the Association of Editors, among others, who urged the politicians of the Finns and National Coalition Party to respect the freedom of the press.

On 6 July, the Council of Europe's Commissioner for Human Rights, Dunja Mijatović, released a statement in which she called on the Finnish authorities "…to clearly condemn the smear campaign and any violent online threats made against journalist Ida Erämaa, to investigate the incident and provide any assistance that she may need”.

=== Purra's writings ===
In July 2023, Purra's online comments written prior to her political career, on Jussi Halla-aho's Scripta blog in January–October 2008, emerged in the news media. In the comments, using the username riikka, she frequently used derogatory language and slurs about immigrants, Romanis, ethnic minorities and sexual minorities. In one comment, she wrote: "Anyone feel like spitting on beggars and beating [N-word] [sic] children today in Helsinki?" In another, she referred to "Turkish monkeys".

Purra originally refused to confirm whether she was the user behind the nickname. However, after the comments were condemned by some representatives from the governing parties and President Sauli Niinistö called for the government to adopt a clear zero-tolerance stance on racism, Purra apologized for the comments, she, however, said in a press conference that she has no intention of resigning from her position. She also stated in the same press conference that she does not regret the actions that she made in the past. Soon after, Purra's newer writings from 2019 started to circulate on social media, in which she referred to women in the burqa as "unrecognizable black bags" in the context of criticizing the clothing practice as dehumanizing and misogynistic. Prime Minister Orpo called an excerpt from the writings unacceptable, but considered that Purra's earlier apology for her writings in 2008 was enough. Orpo later clarified that he considers her writings to be an advocation for women's rights.

By 13 July 2023, all opposition parties had demanded that Speaker of the Parliament Jussi Halla-aho recall parliament from summer break to hold a motion of no confidence for Purra. On 15 July 2023, Halla-aho responded by stating that the matter wasn't urgent enough to facilitate a recalling of parliament.

According to a survey conducted 14–19 July 2023, 47% of Finland's populace thought that Purra should resign, while 40% didn't.

=== Anti-racism announcement and training ===
In response to the racism scandals, the government issued an anti-racism announcement in August 2023, outlining 23 measures to promote equality and combat discrimination. The measures included an anti-racism campaign, which was published in August 2024, though the Finns Party declined to join. In September 2024, the government published an action programme to combat racism and promote equality. In June 2025, ministers attended mandatory anti-racism training. Finns Party ministers expressed skepticism toward the training, and the party's vice chair, Teemu Keskisarja, dismissed both the campaign and the training, framing them as part of a "culture war".

=== STEA grant controversy ===
==== Dispute over STEA grants ====
On 15 June, 2026, minister of health and social security Wille Rydman of the Finns Party made a decision on the new criteria for STEA grants, a type of government grants for nonprofit organizations in the health and welfare sector. In doing so he broke convention by failing to consult other parties of the government coalition. His unilateral actions were immediately condemned by minister Anna-Kaisa Ikonen of the coalition leader NCP and Anders Adlercreutz , leader of the junior government party SFP. Sources from inside the cabinet also told the media that there were concerns about the apparent targeting of cuts at sexual and gender minorities. Minister Rydman declined to comment on the matter.

On 16 June, prime minister Orpo stated that the government would meet together to reconsider the criteria and affirmed that Rydman's actions were not in line with expected practises. However, minister Mari Rantanen of the Finns party expressed support for Rydman's decision both in terms of procedure and substance while leader of the Christian Democrats Sari Essayah gave her support to the substance of the decision. On the 17th Rydman stated, in direct opposition to the prime minister, that his decision would remain and that there is nothing to be negotiated before the making of the final grant decisions.

On 18 June, the opposition Left Alliance treathened Rydman with a motion of no confidence that was then made on Monday 22nd by Left Alliance MP Anna-Kaisa Pekonen. The motion of no confidence was made on the grounds that the decision unfairly targeted minorities and suppressed the ability of citizens to voice their opinions. On the 22nd the prime minister also announced that on the 23rd the government would decide on whether to have the criteria reconsidered. Leader of the Finns party and deputy prime minister Riikka Purra opposed this stating that all ministers of the party would vote against the proposal of the prime minister after unsuccessful negotiations over the weekend. Rydman also affirmed that the criteria would not be changed and questioned the complaints of coalition partners.

The government voted on 23 June to return the criteria to preparation by civil servants in an expedited manner and to if necessary alter Rydman's decision by amending the government degree related to the grants. The vote in the cabinet was 10 for and 7 against the proposal of the prime minister with the Finns party standing behind Rydman. Riikka Purra expressed doubt whether, after the events of a confidence vote in parliament, such a degree could be negotiated.

==== Escalation to the brink of a government crisis ====
The controversy escalated to the brink of a crisis on 23 June in the aftermath of the cabinet vote when all 10 members of parliament for the SFP abstained in the 88-74 confidence vote for Rydman. Despite this he was able to retain office. Riikka Purra stated that there are remaining legal questions related to the cabinet vote and that the abstensions of the SFP had essentially swepped the rug from under the prime minister. Multiple members or parliament and ministers for the party echoed her opinion expressing infuriation and questioning the concept of abstaining from confidence. The prime minister expressed disappointment in the SFP while Adlercreutz said that the party wanted to express the severity of the situation without collapsing the government. Adlercreutz has described the vote decision as being about a question of coalition principles instead of one decision or organisation. However, the prime minister has said that the disagreements are actually not very extensive. He has said that the crisis is unwarranted.

Experts stated to media outlet MTV that the power struggle is extraordinary. They expressed that restoration of order and the continuation of the government may require resignatition from Rydman, but that on the other hand it is in the interest of the parties that the coalition continues governing. Media outlets have proceeded to describe the situation as an early stage government crisis, something which the opposition and even Rydman have echoed. However as of the 24th politicians have not taken up the idea of a full blown government crisis.

== Opinion polling ==
In June 2023, 49% of Finns predicted that the government would not be able to finish its four-year term, while 28% said that it would. In July 2023, the percentage of those who predicted that the government would not be able to finish its term rose to 56%, while 23% thought that it would finish its term. Furthermore, 32% respondents thought that the government should resign immediately, while 52% thought that it shouldn't.

According to a survey conducted in August 2023, 23.6% of Finns were satisfied with the activities of the Orpo Cabinet, while 61.7% were not.

Despite the above-mentioned opinion polls, the support of the two largest government parties, the National Coalition Party and the Finns Party, has remained stable after the elections. For example, in Yle's poll in February 2024, the National Coalition was the most popular party with 22.4% supporting it, the Social Democrats the second most popular with 20.4% support, and the Finns Party the third most popular with 20.0% support. This has been considered a sign in various op-eds that the opposition is unable to offer and convey a decent enough alternative to the government's policy.

The Finns Party polled 5% points lower in July 2024, with only 15.6% support remaining.

| Preceded by Sanna Marin's cabinet | Petteri Orpo's cabinet 2023 — | Succeeded by Incumbent |
