= Orpo =

Orpo may refer to:

- Ordnungspolizei, the uniformed police force in Nazi Germany 1936–1945
- Petteri Orpo (born 1969), Finnish politician
