= Riikka Purra =

Finnish politician (born 1977)

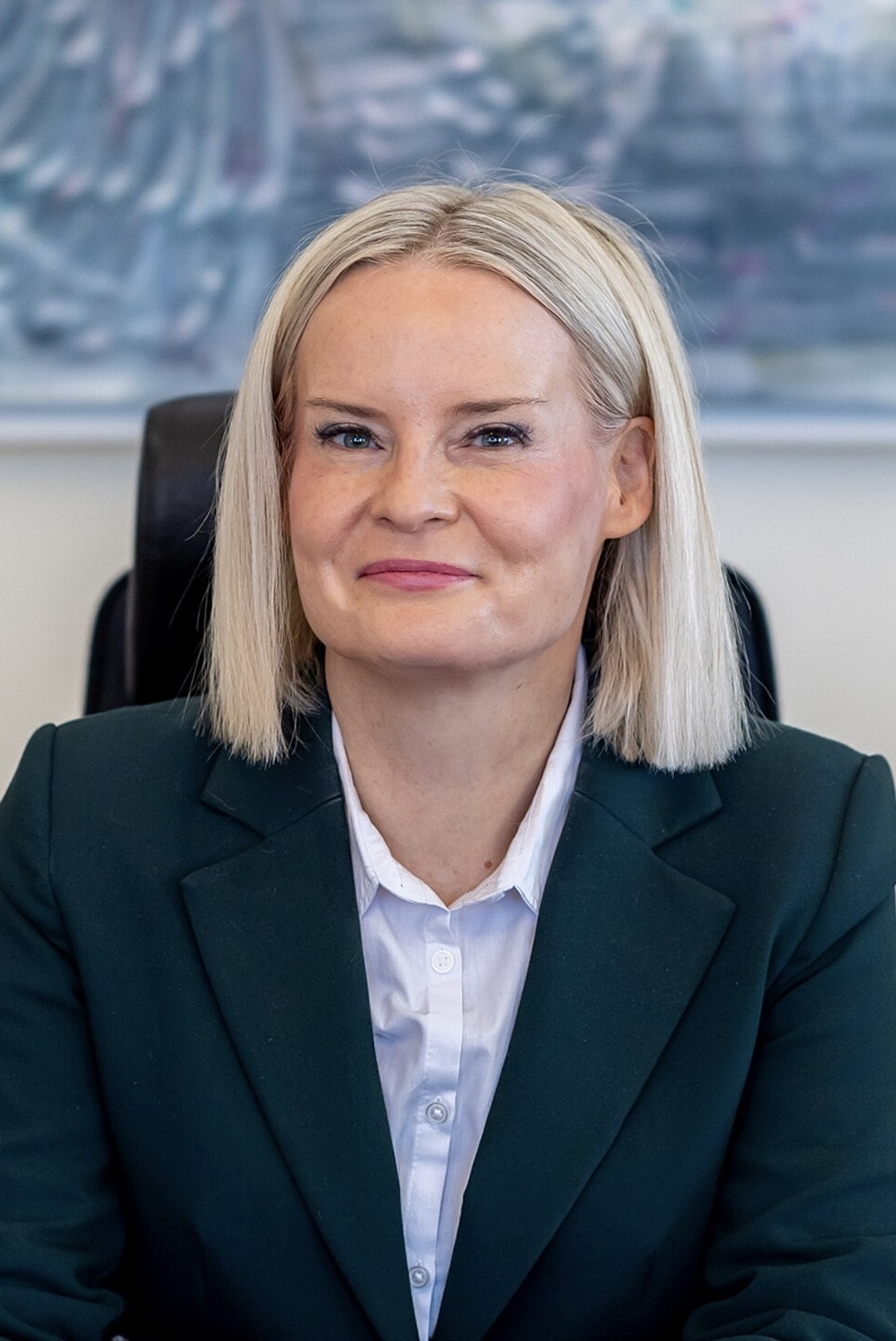
- Purra in 2026

37th Deputy Prime Minister of Finland
- Incumbent
- Assumed office 20 June 2023
- Prime Minister: Petteri Orpo
- Preceded by: Annika Saarikko

Minister of Finance
- Incumbent
- Assumed office 20 June 2023
- Prime Minister: Petteri Orpo
- Preceded by: Annika Saarikko

Leader of the Finns Party
- Incumbent
- Assumed office 14 August 2021
- Preceded by: Jussi Halla-aho

Member of Parliament for Uusimaa
- Incumbent
- Assumed office 17 April 2019

Personal details
- Born: 13 June 1977 (age 49) Pirkkala, Finland
- Party: Finns Party
- Spouse: Mikko Välimaa
- Children: 2
- Education: University of Turku

Riikka Katriina Purra (Note: Finnish pronunciation: [ˈriːkːɑ ˈkɑtriːnɑ ˈpurːɑ]) (born 13 June 1977) is a Finnish politician, serving as the Deputy Prime Minister of Finland, and Finance Minister, since 2023. She is also a member of the Parliament of Finland for the Finns Party for the Uusimaa constituency. In August 2021 she was elected the new leader of the party, after Jussi Halla-aho.

== Political career ==
In 2016, Purra joined the Finns Party as a political planner. She served as a campaign manager for the presidential candidate Laura Huhtasaari in the 2018 Finnish presidential election. In June 2019 she was elected as a Member of Parliament from the constituency of Uusimaa with 5,960 votes, and became the first deputy leader of the Finns party.

In March 2021, she criticised the government for overspending, when a 3 billion euro support package for municipalities was formed during the COVID-19 pandemic in Finland.

In July 2021, Purra announced she would be running for the Finns Party leadership, aiming to become the first woman to lead the party. She declared that the party would never participate in a government where it would not be able to significantly change Finnish immigration policy. She was elected leader of the party on 14 August 2021, at the party meeting in Seinäjoki.

Purra says that she wants to fight "harmful" immigration from developing countries and is in favour of a policy of economic austerity. Purra has said that in her youth she was sexually harassed by immigrant men in her hometown of Tampere, which has influenced her opinions on immigration policy.

== Controversies ==
=== Early July 2023 ===
On 5 July 2023, Purra announced the nomination of Wille Rydman as the new Minister of Economic Affairs. The decision was controversial. Before the nomination MP Rydman had been a member of the Finns Party only for a half a year, representing before that prime minister Petteri Orpo's NCP. Rydman was in 2022 subjected to allegations of sexual misconduct by a number of women from his earlier life. The allegations lead NCP leader Orpo to practically denounce Rydman.

Rydman's nomination was due to the unexpected resignation of the previous economic affairs minister, Vilhelm Junnila, who stepped down after just ten days in office. Junnila's departure was triggered by a scandal involving his alleged association with far-right groups, leading to a no-confidence motion. The swift downfall of Junnila created a turbulent political climate, intensifying the scrutiny and attention surrounding Rydman's appointment.

=== Middle July 2023 ===
On 10 July, Purra's online comments written in 2008 prior to her political career to Jussi Halla-aho's Scripta blog emerged in the media. In the comments, using the username riikka, she frequently used the word "neekeri" and used otherwise racist and derogatory language such as "mocha dick" and "Turkish monkey" while describing being sexually harassed in public by men of immigrant background. She wrote about a confrontation on a suburban train with a group of young immigrants: "If they gave me a gun, there'd be bodies on a commuter train, you see." On one post she asked if anyone in the "Netsit" (Note: "Netsit" is a nickname for anti-immigration netizens which is also a play on the Finnish word for Nazis, natsit.) community was up for "spitting on beggars and beating nigger children today in Helsinki?" Additionally, she described "the sound darker males make when they pass you by" as "not whistling (that would be too obvious) but a hiss between the teeth," adding, "The more eager Abdullah is, the more saliva comes with it."

Purra originally refused to confirm whether she was behind the nickname and also said that she had no intention of resigning or regretting her past actions. However, after the comments were condemned by some representatives from the ruling parties and President Sauli Niinistö had called for the government to adopt a clear zero-tolerance stance on racism, Purra apologized for the comments. Purra also stated that some of the expressions used were inside humor.

Soon after, Purra's newer writings from 2019 started to circulate in social media, in which she referred to women in burqa as "unrecognizable black sacks only recognizable as human by the small humans they're usually pulling after themselves" in context of criticizing the clothing practice as dehumanizing. Prime Minister Orpo called an excerpt from the writings unacceptable, but considered that Purra's earlier apology was enough. Orpo later clarified that he considers the writings to advocate for women's rights.

By 13 July 2023, all opposition parties had demanded that Speaker of the Parliament Jussi Halla-aho, who belongs to the same party as Purra Riikka, would recall parliament from summer break to hold a vote of confidence in Purra. On 15 July, Halla-aho responded by stating that the matter was not urgent enough to recall parliament.

==== Impact and repercussions ====
The controversies received significant global media attention, connecting far-right extremism, Nazism and racism associations to the government. Finnish business sector expressed worries about the impact of the racism debate in Finland, which could potentially harm its international reputation that had already faced negative publicity because of the Junnila case. Main concerns of CEO Jaakko Hirvola from Technology Industries of Finland and CEO Mikael Pentikäinen from Yrittäjät, a national advocacy organisation of small and medium-sized enterprises were export opportunities, and Finland's appeal as an investment destination and a welcoming place for employees.

Editor in chief of Tekniikka&Talous Harri Junttila called the Finns Party reactionary and accused it of destroying Finnish export sector competitiveness.

Professor in communication studies Anu Kantola from the University of Helsinki voiced concern about Finland potentially being associated with Eastern European conservative states. She highlighted that the controversies surrounding ministers in Orpo's recent government, involving racism and far-right connections, offer a compelling narrative for international media. In her view, this narrative contradicts Finland's previous liberal image and has the potential to portray the country negatively.

In contrast, Purra received strong support from her party and Prime Minister Orpo. According to a survey by Helsingin Sanomat involving party district leaders, every leader contacted expressed the view that Purra's actions did not warrant criticism. Marko Mustonen, chairman of the Finns Party's Kainuu district, believed the media's reporting to be an attempt to disrupt the government. He summarized the sentiment shared by many district leaders, stating: "The support for Purra remains strong and unwavering. Riikka is a good person, a good minister, and a strong and capable leader." The Helsingin Sanomat survey reached out to twelve party district chairmen out of sixteen.

According to a survey conducted between 14 and 19 July 2023, 47% thought that Purra should resign, while 40% thought that she should not.

== Personal life ==
Purra is married and has two children. Purra lives with her family in Kirkkonummi, where the local association belongs to the Finns Party. She says her views on immigration were affected after she was sexually harassed in her early teens by persons with a refugee background, while she was living in Tampere. She became interested in immigration policy when she read Jussi Halla-aho's blog Scripta and participated in discussions on Internet forums. Purra is a vegetarian.

Purra has a master's degree in political science and she has dropped her PhD studies on international politics at the University of Turku. She worked as a teacher and researcher before entering politics.

== Notes ==
Political offices
Preceded by Annika Saarikko	Minister of Finance; 2023–present	Incumbent
