= Minister of Economic Affairs (Finland) =

Finnish minister

The Minister of Economic Affairs (Finnish: elinkeinoministeri, Swedish: näringsminister) is one of the Finnish Government's ministerial positions. Along with the Minister of Employment the Minister of Economic Affairs is located within the Ministry of Economic Affairs and Employment.

The Orpo Cabinet's incumbent Minister of Economic Affairs is Sakari Puisto of the Finns Party.

== Ministers ==
No.	Portrait	Minister	Took office	Left office	Time in office	Party	Cabinet
1	Mauri Pekkarinen	Mauri Pekkarinen (born 1947)	1 January 2008	22 June 2011	3 years, 172 days	Centre	Vanhanen II; Kiviniemi
2	Jyri Häkämies	Jyri Häkämies (born 1961)	22 June 2011	16 November 2012	1 year, 147 days	National Coalition	Katainen
3	Jan Vapaavuori	Jan Vapaavuori (born 1965)	16 November 2012	29 May 2015	2 years, 194 days	National Coalition	Katainen; Stubb
4	Olli Rehn	Olli Rehn (born 1962)	29 May 2015	29 December 2016	1 year, 214 days	Centre	Sipilä
5	Mika Lintilä	Mika Lintilä (born 1966)	29 December 2016	6 June 2019	2 years, 159 days	Centre	Sipilä
6	Katri Kulmuni	Katri Kulmuni (born 1987)	6 June 2019	10 December 2019	187 days	Centre	Rinne
(5)	Mika Lintilä	Mika Lintilä (born 1966)	10 December 2019	20 June 2023	3 years, 192 days	Centre	Marin
7	Vilhelm Junnila	Vilhelm Junnila (born 1982)	20 June 2023	6 July 2023	16 days	Finns	Orpo
8	Wille Rydman	Wille Rydman (born 1986)	6 July 2023	13 June 2025	3 years, 40 days	Finns	Orpo
9	Sakari Puisto	Sakari Puisto (born 1976)	13 June 2025	Incumbent	1 year, 63 days	Finns	Orpo
