= Mari Rantanen =

Finnish politician (born 1976)

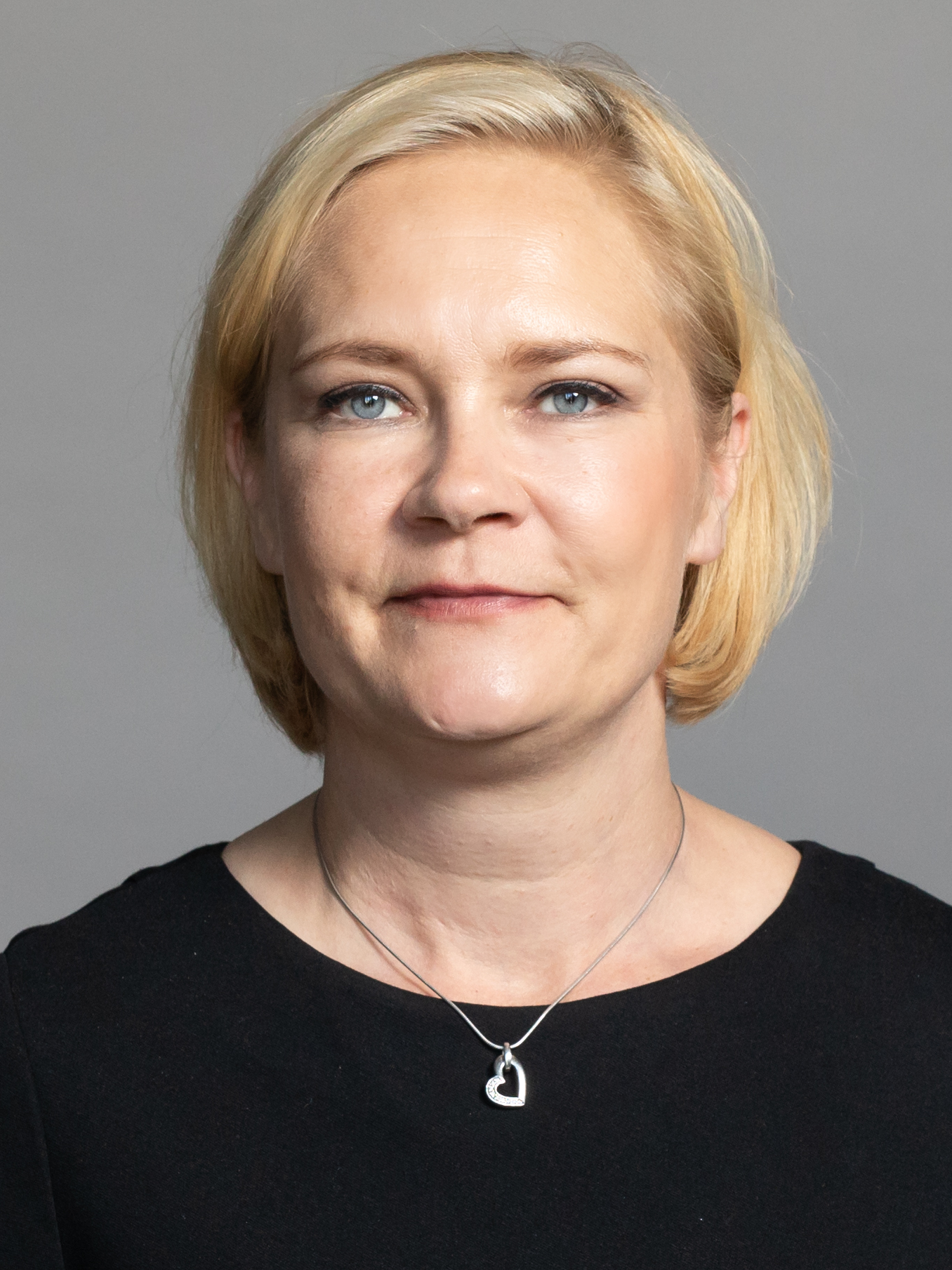
- Rantanen in 2023

Member of the Finnish Parliament for Helsinki
- Incumbent
- Assumed office 17 April 2019

Minister of the Interior
- Incumbent
- Assumed office 20 June 2023
- Prime Minister: Petteri Orpo
- Preceded by: Krista Mikkonen

Personal details
- Born: 29 March 1976 (age 50)
- Party: Finns Party

Mari Rantanen (born 29 March 1976) is a Finnish politician of the Finns Party currently serving in the Parliament of Finland for the Helsinki constituency. As a Member of Parliament, she has served as a member of the Committee on Legal Affairs in 2019-2022. Rantanen was elected Chairman of the Committee on Administrative Affairs in November 2022. Before her political career, Rantanen worked as a nurse and as a police officer.

In June 2023, she was appointed Minister of the Interior in the Orpo Cabinet.

In June 2025, she attempted to become the first vice chairman of the Finns party but lost to Teemu Keskisarja in the vote.

== Controversies ==
After her appointment, Rantanen's past remarks came under scrutiny, as she had continuously written about the Great Replacement, even using the hashtag #väestönvaihto (Finnish for the Great Replacement) repeatedly on Twitter. After the story was published, Rantanen stated on Twitter that she did not believe in conspiracies, adding that the demographic pressure on Europe and the resulting demographic change shown by statistics is a fact. Prime Minister Petteri Orpo defended her in an interview, stating that he evaluates ministers based on how they perform their jobs and their adherence to the principles of the government programme. In its 2020 Yearbook, the Finnish Security Police have identified the great replacement theory as one of the notable ideological drivers of far-right terrorism. It also noted that views based on the replacement theory have been highlighted in a number of far-right terrorist attacks.

Ahead of the 2023 Finnish parliamentary election, Rantanen wrote a candidate brief on her website regarding Immigration to Finland, remarking: "we must not be so blue-eyed (a Finnish term for "naive") that soon we will not be blue-eyed (a feature often associated with white people)".

In an interview with Iltalehti, Rantanen was asked what she meant by no longer being blue-eyed, and she replied: "I mean exactly what it says." She denied referring to racial theories and maintained that she "believed in statistics" regarding demographics. She pointed to demographic changes in Sweden, suggesting that Finland should try to avoid similar trends before abruptly ending the interview.

In 2016, amidst the European migrant crisis, Rantanen wrote on social media that the boats of asylum seekers crossing the Mediterranean Sea should be stopped or otherwise "there will be a war". She also liked a comment that stated that refugees should be left to drown and another that called refugees parasites.The Interior Minister commented on his actions on Twitter on after STT reported on the tampering. Iltalehti has found and seen the post with comments on Facebook.

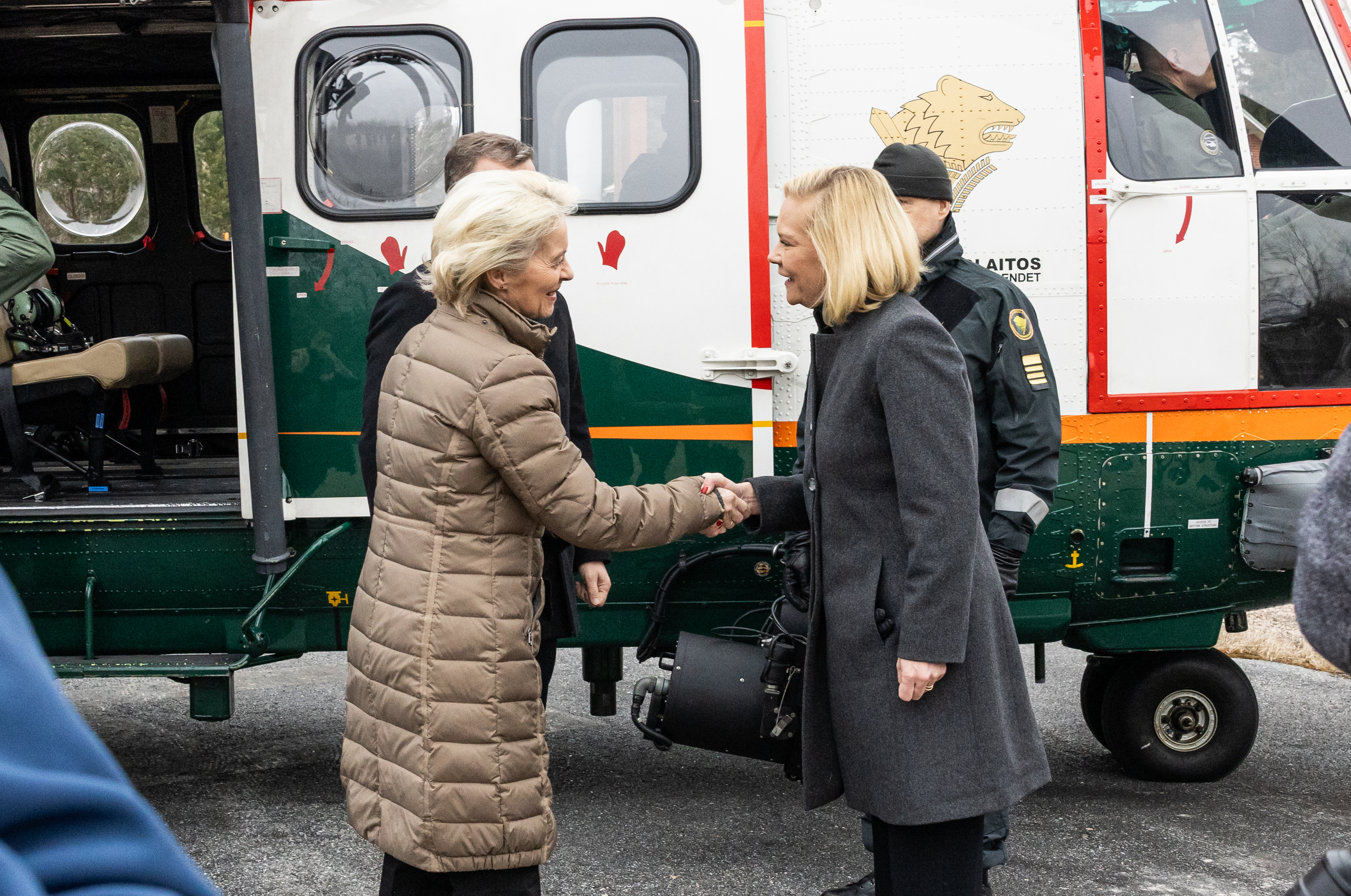
Rantanen and European Commission President Ursula von der Leyen visiting the Lappeenranta and Imatra border crossings on 19 April 2024.

- I have written a lot about politics over the years and I may have inadvertently liked a post whose content I did not agree with. I am a nurse and a police officer. People in distress at sea, or in any distress, will be helped, always," Rantanen writes.

Following the Russian invasion of Ukraine, Rantanen emphasized that Finland supports Kyiv through military materiel, civilian aid, and the provision of temporary protection to individuals fleeing the conflict. In June 2026, during a meeting of the European Union's Justice and Home Affairs Council, she represented Finland and voiced support for extending the Temporary Protection Directive, an EU emergency mechanism granting immediate collective protection to displaced persons. However, she indicated that targeted restrictions should be considered for specific demographics, notably military-age Ukrainian men, to avoid undermining Kyiv's mobilization capacity amidst the Ukrainian conscription crisis. Additionally, Rantanen called for stricter visa policies toward Russian citizens in response to the ongoing invasion.
