= Katri Kulmuni =

Finnish politician (born 1987)

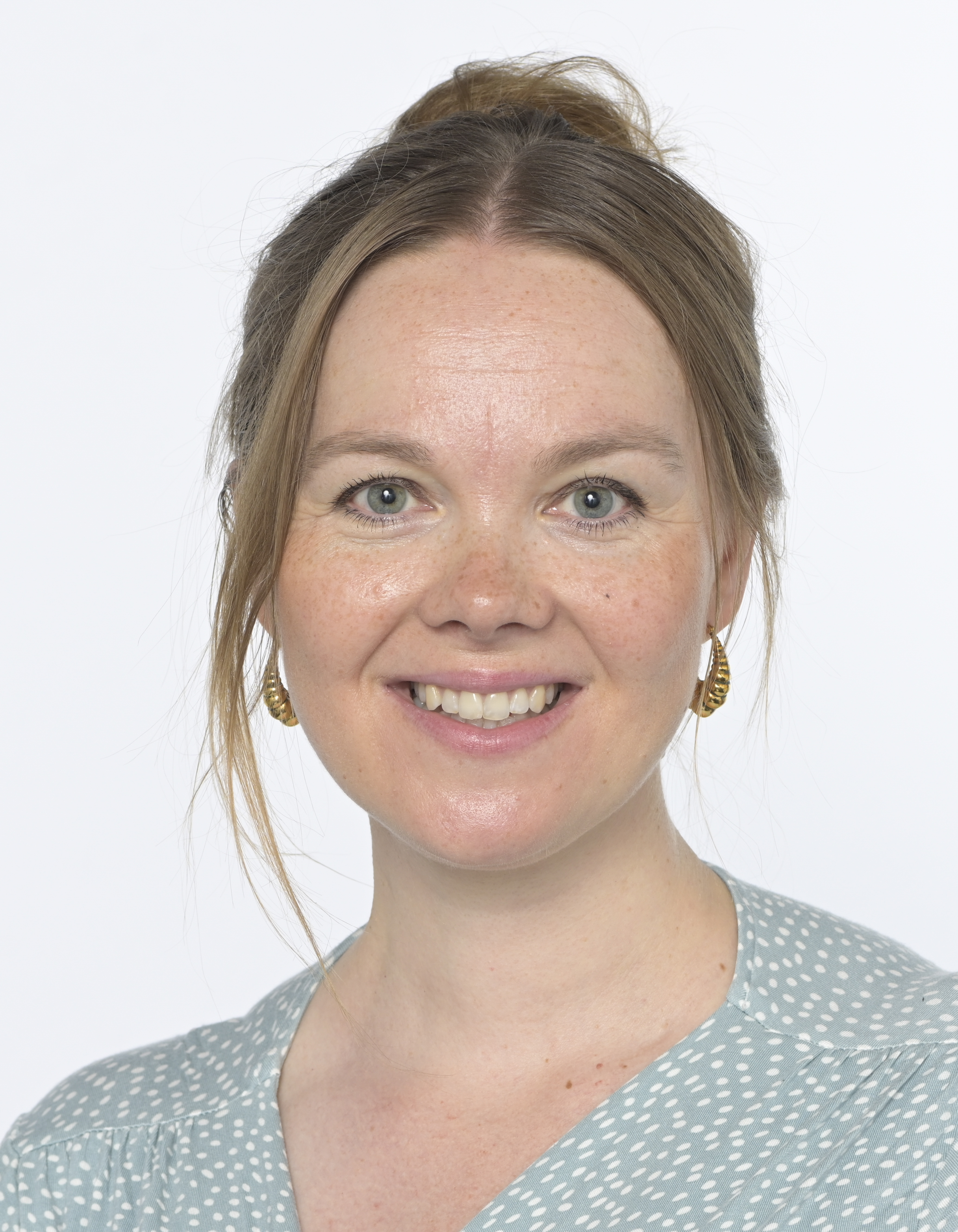
- Kulmuni in 2024

Member of the European Parliament
- Incumbent
- Assumed office 16 July 2024
- Constituency: Finland

34th Deputy Prime Minister of Finland
- In office 12 September 2019 – 9 June 2020
- Prime Minister: Antti Rinne; Sanna Marin
- Preceded by: Mika Lintilä
- Succeeded by: Matti Vanhanen

Minister of Finance
- In office 10 December 2019 – 9 June 2020
- Prime Minister: Sanna Marin
- Preceded by: Mika Lintilä
- Succeeded by: Matti Vanhanen

Minister of Economic Affairs
- In office 6 June 2019 – 10 December 2019
- Prime Minister: Antti Rinne
- Preceded by: Mika Lintilä
- Succeeded by: Mika Lintilä

Leader of the Centre Party
- In office 7 September 2019 – 5 September 2020
- Preceded by: Juha Sipilä
- Succeeded by: Annika Saarikko

Member of the Finnish Parliament for Lapland
- In office 22 April 2015 – 16 July 2024
- Succeeded by: Mika Riipi

Personal details
- Born: Katri Briitta Ilona Kulmuni; 4 September 1987 (age 39) Tornio, Lapland, Finland
- Party: Centre
- Spouse: Jyrki Peisa
- Education: University of Lapland (MSS)
- Website: katrikulmuni.fi

Katri Briitta Ilona Kulmuni (born 4 September 1987) is a Finnish politician who served as the 35th deputy prime minister of Finland and the leader of the Centre Party between 2019 and 2020. A member of the Centre Party, she was a Member of Parliament from 2015 to 2024. In the 2024 European Parliament election, she was elected to the European Parliament.

== Early life and education ==
Katri Kulmuni's childhood home is on an old family farm where the Kulmuni family has lived since the 15th century. Her father is a rural small business owner and her mother a special education teacher. Kulmuni's hometown Tornio is close to the Finnish-Swedish border, and Kulmuni attended comprehensive school in Haparanda, Sweden, at the joint language school of Tornio and Haparanda. Kulmuni studied also at The European University at Saint Petersburg. Kulmuni graduated from the University of Lapland in 2018 with a Master of Social Science degree. Kulmuni speaks five languages: Finnish, Swedish, English, French and Russian. Her fluency in languages attracted attention during her time as a minister.

Katri Kulmuni is married to lawyer Jyrki Peisa, who works as Director at the Finnish Forest Industries. They have three children.

== Political career ==
Kulmuni joined the Centre Party at the age of 18. She began her political career in local politics in Tornio in the 2008 municipal elections, although she was not yet elected to the city council. She served as a member of the Tornio Youth and Culture Committee from 2009 to 2012. In the 2012 municipal elections, she received the most votes in Tornio, as well as in the 2017 and 2021 municipal elections. Kulmuni chaired the Tornio city council from 2013 to 2019. From December 2010 to June 2011, Kulmuni worked as Press Assistant to Minister for Foreign Trade and Development Paavo Väyrynen.

Kulmuni was elected to the Parliament of Finland in 2015 for the Lapland constituency and reelected in 2019 and 2023. After the 2019 elections, she was named the Minister of Economic Affairs in Antti Rinne's cabinet.

Kulmuni was elected deputy chairperson of the Centre Party in 2016. On 7 September 2019, Kulmuni defeated Antti Kaikkonen in the leadership election of the Centre Party. Five days later, she succeeded Mika Lintilä as the Deputy Prime Minister of Finland. After the collapse of the Rinne Cabinet, Kulmuni became Minister of Finance in the Marin Cabinet.

On 5 June 2020, Kulmuni resigned as Minister of Finance and Deputy Prime Minister after it was revealed that she had been given media training at the cost of 56,203 euros, which was billed to her two ministries. Two days before the resignation announcement, she told media that she would repay the cost. On 8 June, former Prime Minister Matti Vanhanen was elected to succeed Kulmuni as Minister of Finance. Subsequently, Kulmuni justified her resignation by saying that she had to bear overall responsibility for what happened when she learned that the training service was unreasonably expensive. "I didn't want the party to suffer because of this either, and I left my ministerial position. As far as I am concerned, the matter was fortunately closed a long time ago. I also paid the training bills from my own funds, even though there was no legal obligation to do so," Kulmuni wrote in summer 2024.

On 5 September 2020, Annika Saarikko replaced Kulmuni as the Leader of the Centre Party.

=== After 2020 ===
In the 2022 county elections, Kulmuni was elected to the regional council of the wellbeing services county of Lapland. She received highest number of personal votes cast in the constituency of Lapland.

Kulmuni announced on 14 February 2024 that she will stand as a candidate in the 2024 European Parliament elections. Kulmuni said that in the European Parliament she would like to focus especially on natural resource issues, opposing excessive EU regulation of Finland's natural resources. She also opposed increasing joint and several debt mechanisms. Besides, Kulmuni justified her candidacy by her willingness to restore the lost support of the Centre Party. Kulmuni received 67,028 votes and was elected to the European Parliament. Of all candidates, she received the most votes in the constituencies of Oulu and Lapland. A week before election day, Kulmuni gave birth to her second child.

In the European Parliament Kulmuni was elected to the European Parliament Committee on the Environment, Public Health and Food Safety. Kulmuni said that she was satisfied with her seat on the committee, because the committee deals with issues related to Finnish forests and forestry, among other things.

Kulmuni has named the first female Minister of Education in Finland, Kerttu Saalasti as her political role model. In her statements Kulmuni has emphasized decentralization as the Centre Party's most important ideology.

== Other activities ==
=== Finnish organizations ===
- The UN Association of Finland, Chairperson (2016–2017)
- The Finnish 4H Federation, Member of the Committee (2016–)

=== European Union organizations ===
- European Investment Bank (EIB), Ex-Officio Member of the Board of Governors (2019–2020)
- European Stability Mechanism (ESM), Member of the Board of Governors (2019–2020)

=== International organizations ===
- Asian Infrastructure Investment Bank (AIIB), Ex-Officio Member of the Board of Governors (2019–2020)
- European Bank for Reconstruction and Development (EBRD), Ex-Officio Member of the Board of Governors (2019–2020)
- Nordic Investment Bank (NIB), Ex-Officio Member of the Board of Governors (2019–2020)
- World Bank, Ex-Officio Member of the Board of Governors (2019–2020)

== Controversy ==
Shortly after her 2019 appointment as finance minister, Kulmuni caused controversy when she posted an informal Instagram poll on whether the government should allow Finnish women with links to Islamic State to return from Syria, or just their children. She deleted the post and apologized after criticism by Human Rights Watch.

It was claimed in the Finnish press that Prime Minister Sanna Marin did not get along well with Katri Kulmuni and called her a nuisance. Kulmuni later said that cooperation in Marin Cabinet did not go well and that she had supported a stricter economic policy.

Political offices
| Preceded by Mika Lintilä | Minister of Finance; 2019–2020 | Succeeded by Matti Vanhanen |
Party political offices
| Preceded by Juha Sipilä | Leader of the Centre Party; 2019–2020 | Succeeded by Annika Saarikko |
