= Sakari Puisto =

Finnish politician (born 1976)

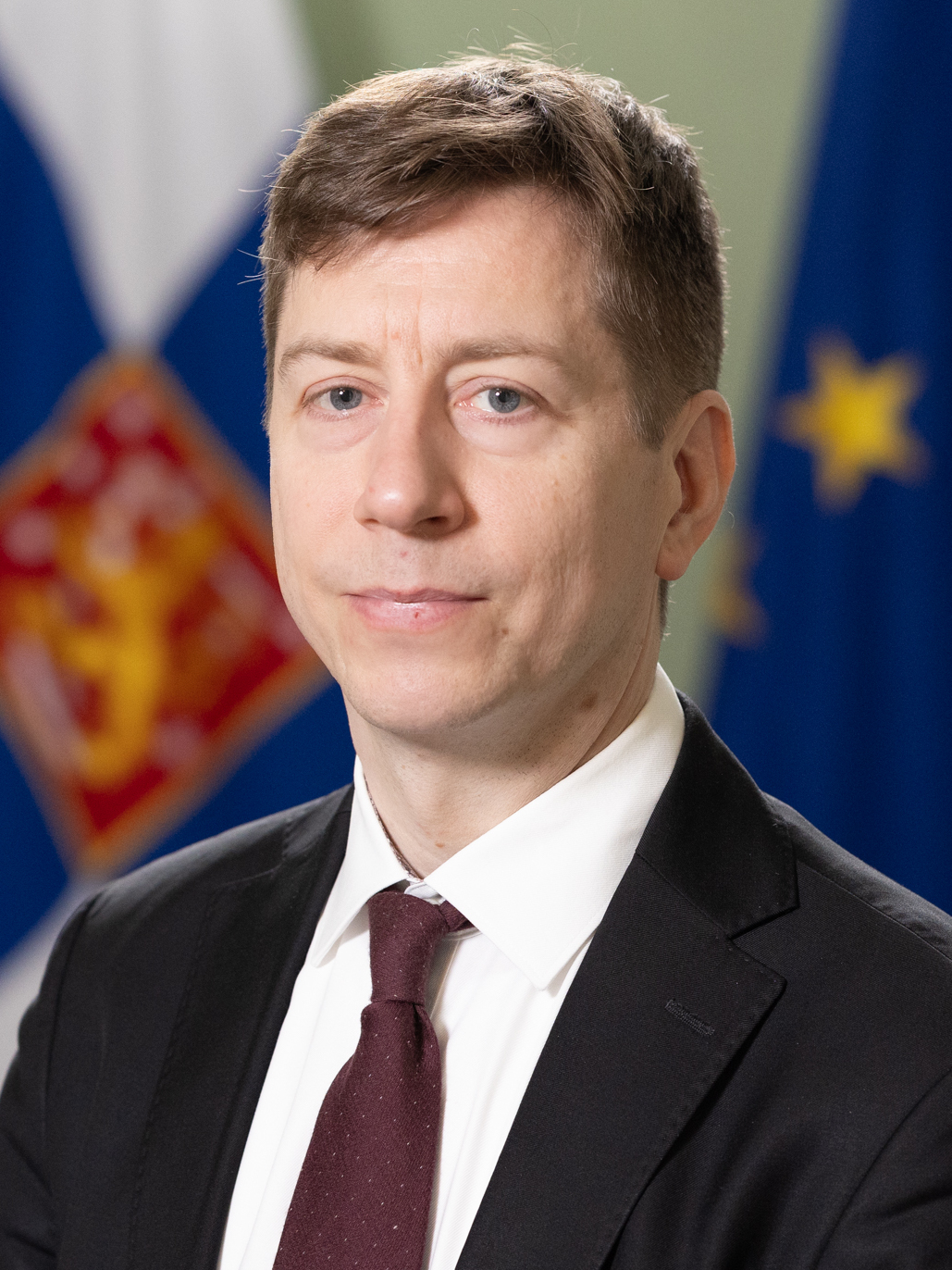
- Puisto in 2025

Minister of Economic Affairs
- Incumbent
- Assumed office 13 June 2025
- Prime Minister: Petteri Orpo
- Preceded by: Wille Rydman

Member of Parliament for Pirkanmaa
- Incumbent
- Assumed office 17 April 2019

Personal details
- Born: 19 December 1976 (age 49) Tampere, Pirkanmaa, Finland
- Party: Finns Party
- Education: University of Cambridge
- Website: sakaripuisto.fi

Sakari Rainer Puisto (born 19 December 1976 in Tampere) is a Finnish politician serving as Minister of Economic Affairs, representing the Finns Party. He was a candidate of the Finns Party in European Parliament elections in 2014 and in parliamentary elections in 2015 and 2019. In spring 2015, he participated in the government negotiations. He worked as a Senior Adviser to former Minister of Employment Jari Lindström in the Ministry of Economic Affairs and Employment of Finland. During this time, he especially focused on the asylum seeker crisis as well as education and innovation policy, in addition to economic affairs and employment policy. In 2019, he was a candidate of the Finns Party in Pirkanmaa constituency and was elected to the Parliament.

In 1995, Puisto graduated from Sampo upper secondary school in Tampere. After his military service, he moved to Britain to study physical sciences in Cambridge University. In 2004, he obtained a Ph.D. degree from Cambridge University. After that, he worked for local companies in South China ‒ in Shenzhen and Hong Kong. Puisto has been a visiting scholar in Cambridge University.

In July 2021, Puisto announced he would run for the leader of the Finns Party after Jussi Halla-aho announced he would not seek another term. He eventually lost the election to Riikka Purra.

On 13 June 2025, he was appointed Minister of Economic Affairs in the Orpo Cabinet.

== Memberships in committees ==
- Commerce Committee (chair) 19 April 2023 – 13 June 2025
- Foreign Affairs Committee (deputy member) 18 June 2019 – 13 June 2025
- Speaker's Council (member) 19 April 2023 – 13 June 2025
- Forum for International Affairs (member) 27 June 2019 – 13 June 2025
- The Parliamentary Supervisory Council of the Bank of Finland (member) 28 June 2023 – 13 June 2025

In addition, he is the Chair of the Finnish Parliamentary Friendship Group of Lithuania since 2019.

== Elections ==
=== European Parliament elections ===
- 2014: 2,684 votes (not elected)

=== Parliamentary elections ===
- 2015: 2,762 votes (Pirkanmaa constituency; not elected)
- 2019: 4,837 votes (Pirkanmaa constituency; elected)
- 2023: 6,592 votes (Pirkanmaa constituency; elected)

=== Municipal elections ===
- 2017: 508 votes (Tampere; elected)
- 2021: 1 431 votes (Tampere; elected)
- 2025: 608 votes (Tampere; elected)
