= Mika Lintilä =

Finnish politician

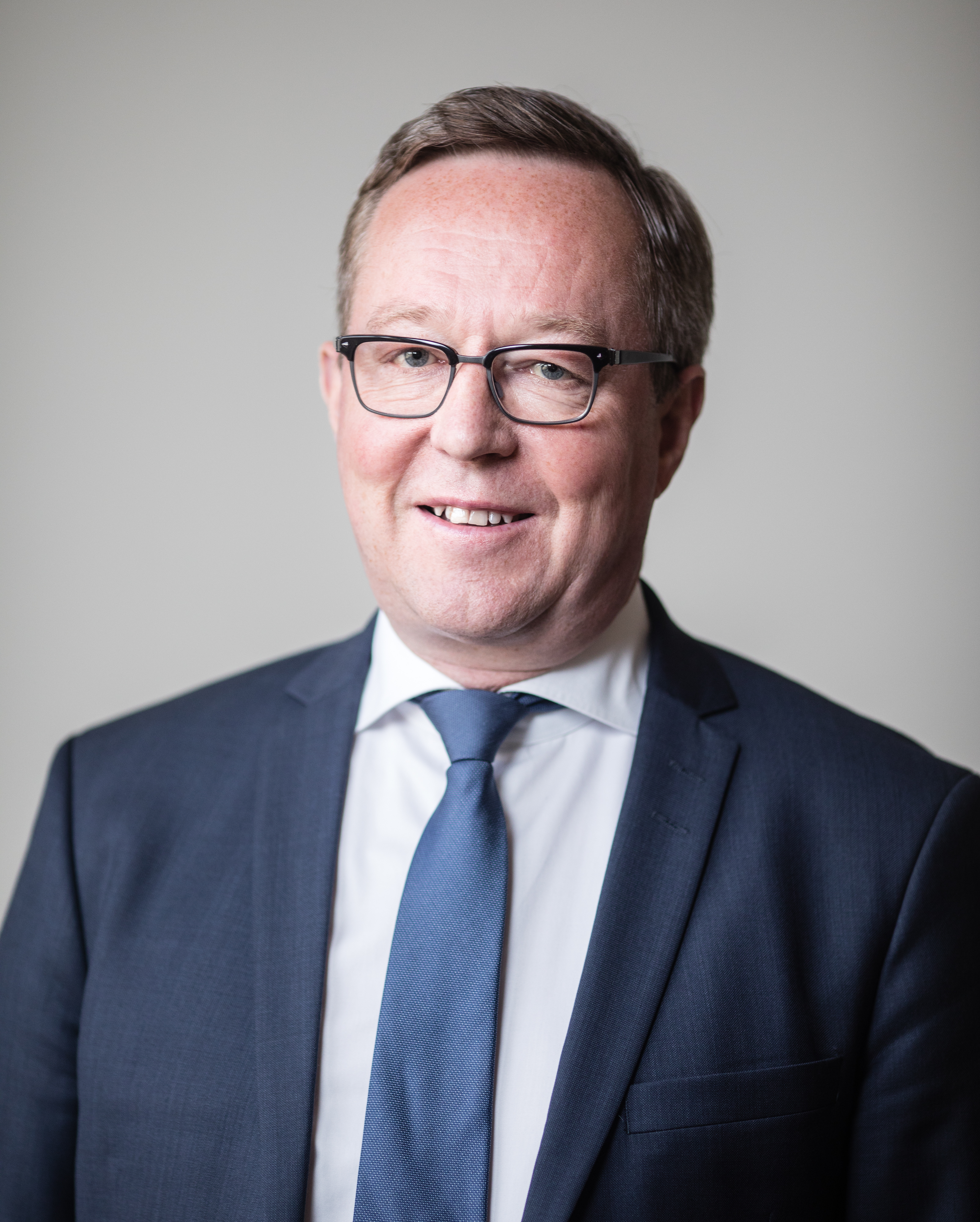

33rd Deputy Prime Minister of Finland
- In office 6 June 2019 – 12 September 2019
- Prime Minister: Antti Rinne
- Preceded by: Petteri Orpo
- Succeeded by: Katri Kulmuni

Minister of Finance
- In office 6 June 2019 – 10 December 2019
- Prime Minister: Antti Rinne
- Preceded by: Petteri Orpo
- Succeeded by: Katri Kulmuni

Minister of Economic Affairs
- In office 10 December 2019 – 20 June 2023
- Prime Minister: Sanna Marin
- Preceded by: Katri Kulmuni
- Succeeded by: Vilhelm Junnila
- In office 29 December 2016 – 6 June 2019
- Prime Minister: Juha Sipilä
- Preceded by: Olli Rehn
- Succeeded by: Katri Kulmuni

Member of the Finnish Parliament for Vaasa
- Incumbent
- Assumed office 24 March 1999

Personal details
- Born: 15 April 1966 (age 60) Toholampi, Finland
- Party: Centre
- Education: Tampere University
- Website: www.mikalintila.fi

Mika Tapani Lintilä (born 15 April 1966) is a Finnish politician who served as Minister of Economic Affairs from 2019 to 2023. A member of the Centre Party, he has been a Member of Parliament (MP) since 1999. Lintilä has formerly served as Minister of Economic Affairs in the Sipilä Cabinet from 2016 to 2019 and as Minister of Finance and Deputy Prime Minister of Finland in the Rinne Cabinet in 2019.

== Early life and education ==
Lintilä is the son of the Centre Party MP Aaro Lintilä. He holds a Bachelor of Administrative Sciences from the University of Tampere.

== Political career ==
=== Member of the Finnish Parliament, 1999–present ===
Lintilä has been serving as a member of the Finnish Parliament since the 1999 elections. He has since served on a variety of committees, including the following:

- Commerce Committee (member) 7 April 1999 – 18 March 2003
- Committee for the Future (deputy member) 23 April 1999 – 29 February 2000, (deputy member) 3 March 2000 – 15 March 2002, (member) 19 March 2002 – 18 March 2003, (deputy member) 3 April 2007 – 2 May 2007, (member) 5 May 2015 – 8 June 2015
- Finance Committee (deputy member) 28 November 2000 – 4 September 2001, (deputy member) 2 April 2003 – 25 April 2003, (member) 29 April 2003 – 20 March 2007, (member) 3 May 2007 – 19 April 2011, (deputy member) 3 May 2011 – 29 June 2011, (member) 30 June 2011 – 21 April 2015
- Administration Committee (deputy member) 2 April 2003 – 8 September 2006, (deputy member) 5 May 2015 – 8 June 2015
- Subcommittee for Administration and Control (member) 8 April 2003 – 20 March 2007
- Tax Subcommittee (member) 8 April 2003 – 20 March 2007, (Chair) 4 May 2007 – 19 April 2011, (member) 1 September 2011 – 21 April 2015
- Subcommittee for Education and Science (additional member) 8 April 2003 – 5 May 2003, (member) 6 May 2003 – 20 March 2007
- Sub-committee for Employment and the Economy (member) 4 May 2007 – 19 April 2011, (member) 1 September 2011 – 21 April 2015
- Social Affairs and Health Committee (member) 3 May 2011 – 29 June 2011
- Audit Committee (member) 30 June 2011 – 21 April 2015
- Transport and Communications Committee (member) 5 May 2015 – 8 June 2015
- Electors (member) 6 April 1999 – 29 February 2000
- Parliamentary Auditors (deputy member) 1 January 2000 – 31 December 2007
- Administrative Council of the Finnish Broadcasting Company (member) 14 April 2000 – 2 May 2007, (Chair) 30 November 2004 – 2 May 2007
- Parliamentary State Auditors (deputy member) 1 January 2004 – 20 March 2007
- Parliamentary Supervisory Council (member) 3 May 2007 – 29 June 2011
- Commissioners to the Government Guarantee Fund (member) 30 June 2011 – 12 March 2015, (vice chair) 21 September 2011 – 12 March 2015
- Finance Committee (member) 9 June 2015 – present
- Subcommittee for Administration and Security (member) 11 September 2015 – present
- Tax Subcommittee (Chair) 11 September 2015 – present
- Commerce Committee (member) 9 June 2015 – present

In addition to his committee assignments, Lintilä has been a deputy member of the Finnish Delegation to the Nordic Council (since 1999) and a full member of the delegation to the Inter-Parliamentary Union (since 2015).

=== Minister of Economic Affairs, 2016–2019 ===
On 27 October 2016, Lintilä was elected within the Centre Party to follow Olli Rehn as a Minister of Economic Affairs starting 29 December 2016.

During his time in office, Finland's center-right government sold stakes in oil refiner and biofuel company Neste while also strengthening national influence over the telecom network gear maker Nokia.

=== Minister of Finance, 2019 ===
Following the 2019 national elections, the Centre Party named Mika Lintilä as its candidate for the post of finance minister in the newly formed, centre-left coalition government led by Prime Minister Antti Rinne of the Social Democrats. In this capacity, he chaired the meetings of the Economic and Financial Affairs Council when Finland held the rotating presidency of the Council of the European Union in 2019.

After the collapse of the Rinne Cabinet, the leader of the Center Party Katri Kulmuni took the seat of the Minister of Finance in the following Marin Cabinet, while Lintilä was given the portfolio of the Minister of Economic Affairs.

== Other activities ==
=== European Union organizations ===
- European Investment Bank (EIB), Ex-Officio Member of the Board of Governors (2019)
- European Stability Mechanism (ESM), Member of the Board of Governors (2019)

=== International organizations ===
- Asian Infrastructure Investment Bank (AIIB), Ex-Officio Member of the Board of Governors (2019)
- European Bank for Reconstruction and Development (EBRD), Ex-Officio Member of the Board of Governors (2019)
- Nordic Investment Bank (NIB), Ex-Officio Member of the Board of Governors (2019)
- Multilateral Investment Guarantee Agency (MIGA), World Bank Group, Ex-Officio Member of the Board of Governors (since 2017)
- World Bank, Ex-Officio Member of the Board of Governors (since 2017)

=== Finnish organizations ===
- Yle, Member of the Administrative Council (2011–2019)
- Bank of Finland, Deputy Member of the Board of Auditors (2004-2006)

== Political positions ==
In response to the 2019 Amazon rainforest wildfires, Lintilä demanded publicly that the European Union should block imports of beef from Brazil, and also consider a suspension of soybeans import to put pressure on the government of President Jair Bolsonaro to counter the fires.

== Honors ==
- Order of the White Rose of Finland (Finland, 2019)
- Order of the Lion of Finland (Finland, 2007)

Political offices
Preceded by Petteri Orpo	Minister of Finance; 2019	Succeeded by Katri Kulmuni
