= Wille Rydman =

Finnish politician (born 1986)

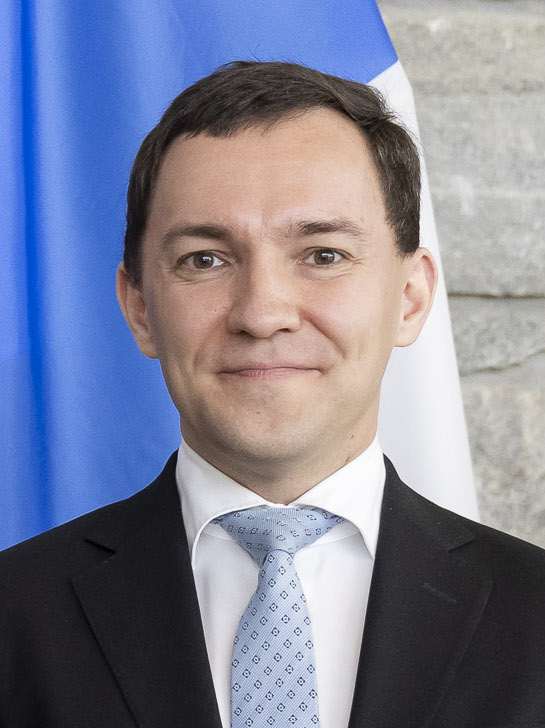
- Rydman in 2024

Minister of Social Affairs and Health
- Incumbent
- Assumed office 20 February 2026
- Prime Minister: Petteri Orpo
- Preceded by: Kaisa Juuso

Minister of Economic Affairs
- In office 6 July 2023 – 13 June 2025
- Prime Minister: Petteri Orpo
- Preceded by: Vilhelm Junnila
- Succeeded by: Sakari Puisto

Member of Parliament for Helsinki
- Incumbent
- Assumed office 22 April 2015

Personal details
- Born: 2 January 1986 (age 40) Helsinki, Uusimaa, Finland
- Party: Finns Party (since 2023)
- Other political affiliations: National Coalition Party (until 2023)
- Education: University of Helsinki
- Website: willerydman.fi

Wille-Werner Rydman (born 2 January 1986) is a Finnish politician currently serving in the Parliament of Finland, representing the constituency of Helsinki. He represents the Finns Party, and formerly the National Coalition Party. Rydman was elected to the parliament in 2015, gaining 4,524 votes in the elections. He has also been a member of the City Council of Helsinki since 2012. He received a Masters of Social Sciences from the University of Helsinki in 2008, after which he worked as a parliamentary assistant. On 6 July 2023, Rydman was appointed Minister of Economic Affairs in the Orpo cabinet.

== Political views ==
Helsingin Sanomat named Rydman as one of the most right-wing members of parliament elected in 2015. Rydman describes himself as a conservative.

== Life outside of politics ==
Rydman has always taken interest in music, especially classical music, and his grandfather is composer and music teacher Kari Rydman As a child he was a member in the Cantores Minores boys' choir. He studied music theory in the Sibelius Academy and in The Helsinki Conservatory of Music, playing the concert flute. He has also served as chairman of the Helsinki Philharmonic Orchestra and as a board member of the Finnish National Opera and Ballet.

After finishing secondary school in the Normal Lyceum of Helsinki, and then his military service, he went to the University of Helsinki, receiving his Masters of Social Sciences degree in 2008. He completing his studies in two years. In November 2010, his national romanticist symphony Aino – Sinfoninen runo kalevalaisesta legendasta was first performed by the Tampere Academic Symphony Orchestra in Kouvola.

== Controversies ==
=== 2022 sexual harassment scandal ===
In June 2022, Helsingin Sanomat published an article in which Rydman was accused of grooming and sexually harassing young women and underage girls, while taking advantage of his status as a politician. In the article, some of the women described Rydman's use of violence and offers of alcohol even to those underage. Rydman vehemently denied the claims. After the publication of the story, the National Bureau of Investigation started a preliminary investigation into Rydman. However, no charges were brought against him. After the article was published, the leader of the National Coalition Party, Petteri Orpo, stated that there was a lack of trust towards Rydman. Rydman subsequently left the NCP and joined the Finns Party. The Helsinki Police Department launched a preliminary investigation into the Helsingin Sanomat article as Rydman accused the newspaper of aggravated defamation.

In February 2023, Rydman published a book Salaisuus jota ei ollut ("The Secret That Did Not Exist"), in which he told his own view of the course of events. After the release, the National Bureau of Investigation made a request to the Helsinki Police Department for an investigation of the book in order to find out whether the book contained any confidential information. According to Iltalehti, Rydman has included confidential and classified information from the preliminary investigation inside of the book . After the preliminary investigation, the Helsinki Police Department stated that a trial or sentence would be unreasonable or purposeless, considering the consequences of the act for the suspect.

=== 2023 racist text messages scandal ===
Shortly after being named Minister of Economic Affairs in 2023, as the Finns Party ministers in the Orpo cabinet faced several controversies, Helsingin Sanomat published a series of text messages Rydman had sent to his then-partner Amanda Blick in 2016 in which he used racist language. Rydman had been a 30-year-old Member of Parliament during this time. In the messages Rydman juxtaposes himself with the Nazis and attacks immigrants with racist language. In one message, when Blick had told Rydman how she would like a Hebrew name for her child, "such as Immanuel", Rydman answered: "We Nazis don't really like those kinds of kike things." In another, Rydman is complaining about Germany letting its Nazi architecture deteriorate. In additional racist messages Rydman calls people from the Middle East "monkeys" and "desert monkeys". While pondering about the heritability of his brown eyes, Rydman established: "Even if I bred with a pitch-black Nigerian nigger the child would still have a 26% chance of having green eyes."

In response to the messages, Rydman stated that he would consider taking legal action against the newspaper for publishing the private messages, on the other hand, Prime Minister Petteri Orpo stated that the messages were "inappropriate" but that "the government's work is what needs to be taken care of."

Yaron Nadbornik, President of the Central Council of Jewish Communities in Finland, expressed support for Rydman and called him a "friend of the community".

Blick, a lawyer and NCP member, was one of the women interviewed for the June 2022 Helsingin Sanomat article. She had also made a report to police in 2017 regarding Rydman’s behaviour. Rydman, meanwhile, called Blick's report "harassment" and accused her of organising a group to defame him.

=== Rydman's comments ===
In an interview with NCP online media Verkkouutiset on 3 August, Rydman considered it self-evident that the whole Orpo's government adhered to people's constitutional rights. He didn't want to comment further the private messages published by HS, saying he didn't want to normalise the use of private exchange in journalism or in public discourse. He however found it strange that in the 31 July article the newspaper used the same source and journalist, who both already were under crime investigation concerning the previous 2022 article. Rydman said the term "racism" had suffered from inflation because its profilicated usage in certain hands, which had caused the meaning of the term get blurred and making it difficult to have public [political] discourse. The media he accused of trying to hamstring the new government by driving a wedge between the coalition parties and continuously casting doubt on its cohesion and functionality.

=== Stance of Helsingin Sanomat ===
On 27 July 2023, HS editor Laura Saarikoski defended the usage of private text messages in articles about Rydman. According to her, it was of an exceptional significance, and there were no prohibitions to publishing information that could affect the assessment of an influential person's actions in duty. Saarikoski also commented on using the same journalist in each article to discuss his actions, stating that the ongoing criminal investigation should not have an effect on the newspaper's or its employees' decisions that prevent them from covering Wille Rydman in a negative light. She disclaimed Rydman's accusations against the newspaper's June 2022 article, stating, ″HS has not acquired any new information that would put into question the article's content or the accounts of the women interviewed.″
