= Technology Industries of Finland =

Technology Industries of Finland (Finnish: Teknologiateollisuus ry., Swedish: Teknologiindustrin) is the trade association for Finnish technology industry sector. It is a member organisation to the Confederation of Finnish Industries EK.

According to TIF its member companies covered over 50% of the value of Finnish total export in 2023. The companies employed 338,000 persons.
