= Vilhelm Junnila =

Finnish politician (born 1982)

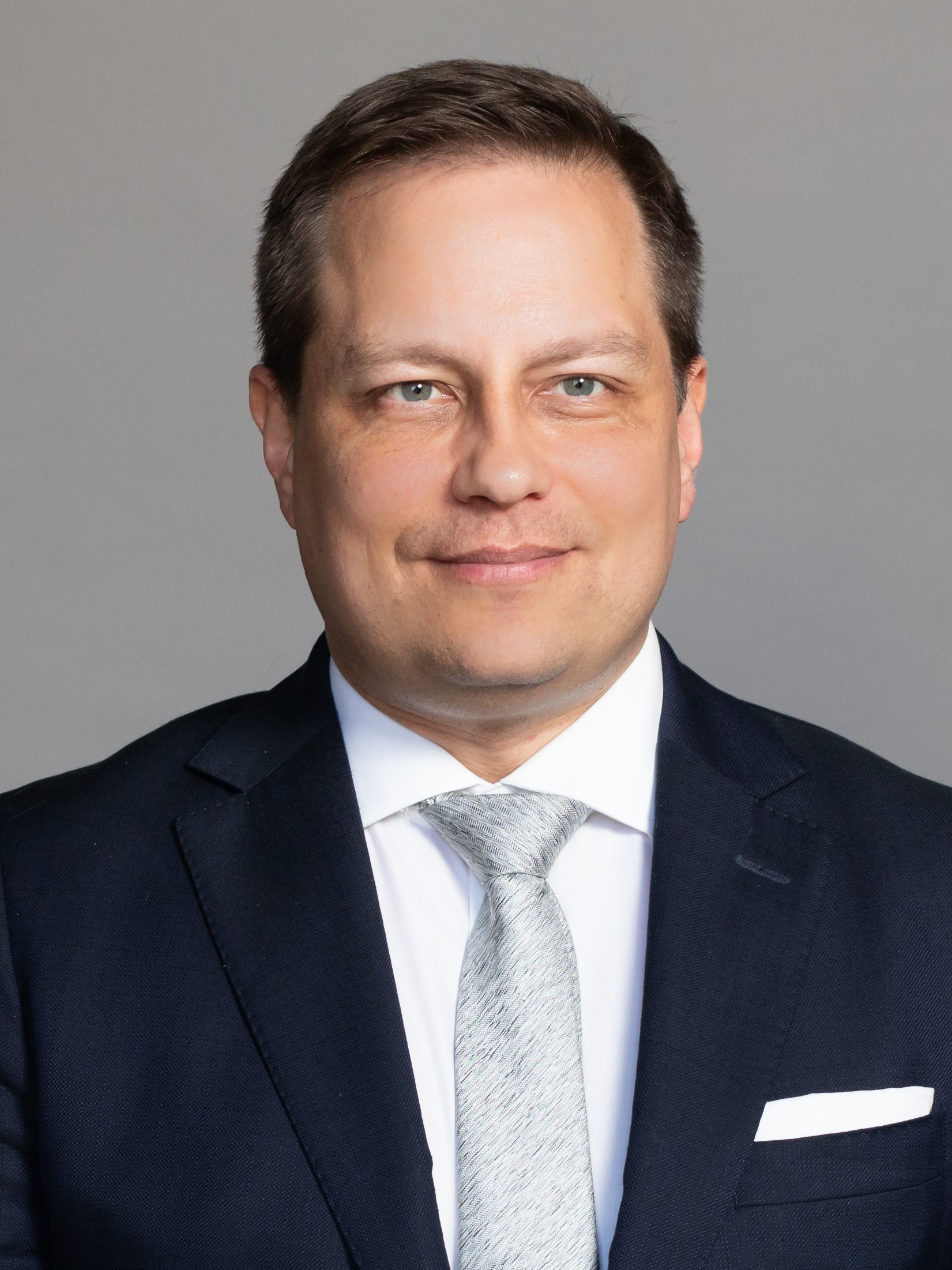
- Junnila in 2023

Minister of Economic Affairs
- In office 20 June 2023 – 6 July 2023
- Prime Minister: Petteri Orpo
- Preceded by: Mika Lintilä
- Succeeded by: Wille Rydman

Member of Parliament for Finland Proper
- Incumbent
- Assumed office 17 April 2019

Personal details
- Born: 6 March 1982 (age 44) Naantali, Southwest Finland, Finland
- Party: Finns Party

Lassi Vilhelm Junnila (born 6 March 1982 in Naantali) is a Finnish politician currently serving in the Parliament of Finland, representing the constituency of Finland Proper. He is a member of the Finns Party. He is currently a member in three committees: the Constitutional Law Committee (vice chairperson), the Foreign Affairs Committee and the Intelligence Oversight Committee. He is also a member in the Finnish delegation to the OSCE Parliamentary Assembly and Finns Party parliamentary group´s vice chairperson.

He was elected to the parliament in 2019 with 10,788 personal votes. In 2023 elections he was elected again with 8303 votes. Junnila is also a member of the Naantali City Council.

In June 2023, he was appointed Minister of Economic Affairs in the Orpo Cabinet. After appointment, Junnila's past actions and potential connections to neo-Nazi organizations became a subject of heated discussion. On 30 June, Junnila announced that he would resign, making his term as a government minister one of the shortest in the political history of Finland since Lennart Oesch, who served as deputy Minister of Internal Affairs for 12 days in 1932. Junnila was succeeded by Wille Rydman as Minister of Economic Affairs on 6 July.

According to an aide, Junnila has previously worked at Fortum Oil and Gas and Neste Oil in IT, at the insulation and scaffolding company Arma Oy, and at smaller companies.

== Political views ==
In between 2019 and 2022, Junnila made four budgetary motions in order to support Veljesapu-Perinneyhdistys, a Finnish organization that cherishes the heritage of the Finnish volunteers in the Waffen-SS. Junnila wrote in his motion, that the support would be "for the promotion of balanced historical research".

In November 2021, Junnila suggested in the Parliament that Finland should promote contraception and "climate abortions" – which he defined as "measures targeted to the population" – in "the underdeveloped societies of Africa" in order to curb population growth and enhance living conditions in Africa. The suggestion was heavily criticized by the former Minister of the Interior Päivi Räsänen, who called it horrendous to suggest that so-called "climate abortions" should be targeted at specific ethnic groups.

In December 2021, Junnila joined to make a statement together with eight other parliament members who condemned Veronika Honkasalo's initiative to boycott Israel's import products. The statement claimed that Honkasalo's suggestion was anti-semitic.

== Alleged neo-Nazi connections ==
After his ministerial position was announced, Junnila's alleged connections to neo-Nazi networks were widely discussed in social media.

=== Memorial event ===
In 2019, Junnila was the featured speaker at a memorial to the victims of the 2017 Turku attack, 188 Kukkavirta, organized by the far-right umbrella organization Coalition of Nationalists (Finnish: Kansallismielisten liittouma) consisting of the vigilante Soldiers of Odin and Nordic Resistance Movement militiassince banned in Finland. According to Junnila, he has no relationship with the coalition. After heated public discussion, Junnila apologized for his conduct and said that he would not take part in far-right events in the future.

=== Campaign remarks ===
In the 2019 Finnish parliamentary election Junnila was randomly assigned the candidate number 88. He then used the far-right symbol 14/88 during his 2019 campaign. He connected his candidate number, 88, with the day of the election, the 14th, to use the phrase "On the 14th, 88" (Finnish: "14. päivänä 88") in his campaign advertising and candidate brief. 14/88 is another popular white supremacist slogan, with the 14 referring to the "Fourteen Words" coined by the white supremacist David Lane ("We must secure the existence of our people and a future for white children.") Yle quoted author Mikko Porvali as saying that Junnila would have been aware what this sequence of numbers meant.

In the run-up to the 2023 election, Junnila spoke at an event where he congratulated another candidate of his party for receiving the number 88, called it a "winning card" and added: "The 88 of course refers to two letters H, about which we'll say no more." (Finnish: ”Tämä 88 viittaa tietenkin kahteen H-kirjaimeen, josta ei sen enempää puhuta.”) Using the number "88" to mean "HH" as shorthand for "Heil Hitler" is a common white supremacist symbol. His remarks were met with a round of laughter and one shout of "Heil Hitler!" (followed by a quieter "sorry.")

=== Other ===
Junnila commented on a photo circulating on social media, allegedly a Facebook photo posted by Junnila to his aide in 2014, that depicts a snowman holding a hangman's noose and with a head resembling a Ku Klux Klan hood, with a caption wishing for a white Christmas as being part of a parodied clip from the 2004 film Downfall ridiculing the person responsible for the snowman.

Junnila's campaign slogan in the 2015 election was "kaasua", which on social media was referred to operating a gas chamber. However, the campaign meant pressing the gas pedal to get rid of the car tax on new vehicles.

== Vote of no confidence and resignation ==
On 27 June, the Green League, Left Alliance, and Social Democratic Party proposed a motion of no confidence against Junnila. Green Party MP Hanna Holopainen presented the motion, stating that Junnila's communication with far-right movements "appears to be continuous and close" and that "Minister Junnila's connections to far-right movements are not an isolated incident, a misunderstanding, or simply bad humor, but rather repeated, systematic, and comradely communication". The last major opposition party, the Centre Party, announced their support the following day.

Junnila survived the motion with a vote of 95-86 on 28 June, with three abstentions and 15 absences. The vote created divisions within the Orpo Cabinet, the newly appointed Government of Finland, with seven of the ten MPs of the government coalition partner, the Swedish People's Party, voting against Junnila and three abstaining. Notably, Ben Zyskowicz, the only Jewish MP, whose father survived Nazi concentration camps and whose government coalition party National Coalition supported Junnila, bucked the process to avoid giving his vote of confidence to Junnila. He was present in the chamber but refrained from voting, and his vote was marked as absent.

Junnila resigned two days later, stating that "For the continuation of the government and the reputation of Finland, I see that it is impossible for me to continue as a minister in a satisfactory way."
