= Petteri Orpo =

Prime Minister of Finland since 2023

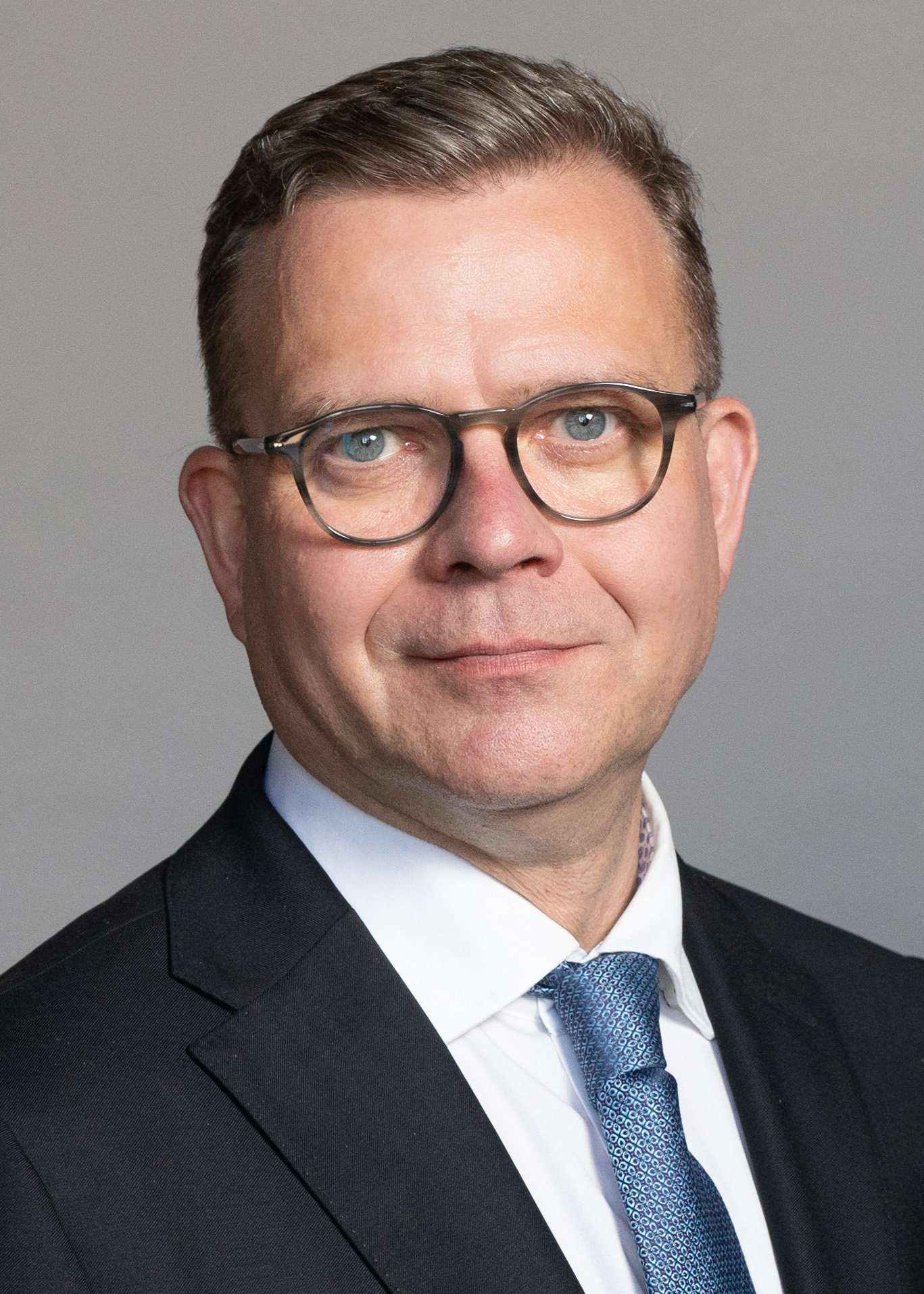
- Official portrait, 2023

47th Prime Minister of Finland
- Incumbent
- Assumed office 20 June 2023
- President: Sauli Niinistö; Alexander Stubb
- Deputy: Riikka Purra
- Preceded by: Sanna Marin

Speaker of the Parliament of Finland
- In office 12 April 2023 – 20 June 2023
- Preceded by: Matti Vanhanen
- Succeeded by: Jussi Halla-aho

Deputy Prime Minister of Finland
- In office 28 June 2017 – 6 June 2019
- Prime Minister: Juha Sipilä
- Preceded by: Timo Soini
- Succeeded by: Mika Lintilä
Ministerial positions
Minister of Finance
In office 22 June 2016 – 6 June 2019
Prime Minister	Juha Sipilä
Preceded by	Alexander Stubb
Succeeded by	Mika Lintilä
Minister of the Interior
In office 29 May 2015 – 22 June 2016
Prime Minister	Juha Sipilä
Preceded by	Päivi Räsänen
Succeeded by	Paula Risikko
Minister of Agriculture and Forestry
In office 24 June 2014 – 29 May 2015
Prime Minister	Alexander Stubb
Preceded by	Jari Koskinen
Succeeded by	Kimmo Tiilikainen

Leader of the National Coalition Party
- Incumbent
- Assumed office 11 June 2016
- Preceded by: Alexander Stubb

Member of the Finnish Parliament for Finland Proper
- Incumbent
- Assumed office 21 March 2007

Personal details
- Born: Antti Petteri Orpo; 3 November 1969 (age 56) Köyliö, Satakunta, Finland
- Party: National Coalition
- Spouse: Niina Kanniainen-Orpo
- Children: 2
- Education: University of Turku (MA)

Antti Petteri Orpo (Note: Finnish pronunciation: [ˈɑntːi ˈpetːeri ˈorpo]) (born 3 November 1969) is a Finnish politician currently serving as the prime minister of Finland since 2023. He has also been the leader of the National Coalition Party since 2016 and briefly served as speaker of the Parliament of Finland after the 2023 parliamentary election.

He served as Deputy Prime Minister of Finland from 2017 to 2019, Minister of Finance from 2016 to 2019, Minister of the Interior from 2015 to 2016 and Minister of Agriculture and Forestry from 2014 to 2015. On 2 April 2023, Orpo's National Coalition Party won the 2023 parliamentary election with a plurality of 20.8% of the vote and 48 seats. Orpo garnered over 17,000 votes in his district.

== Early life and education ==
Antti Petteri Orpo was born on 3 November 1969 in Köyliö, Finland. His father, Hannu Orpo, was a politician and member of the National Coalition Party. Orpo is a member of the centre-right National Coalition Party. He passed the Finnish matriculation exams and graduated from Säkylän seudun lukio. Later Orpo earned a master's degree in political science from the University of Turku. Orpo attended Finland's mandatory national armed service and became a reserve officer. His current reserve rank is captain.

== Political career ==
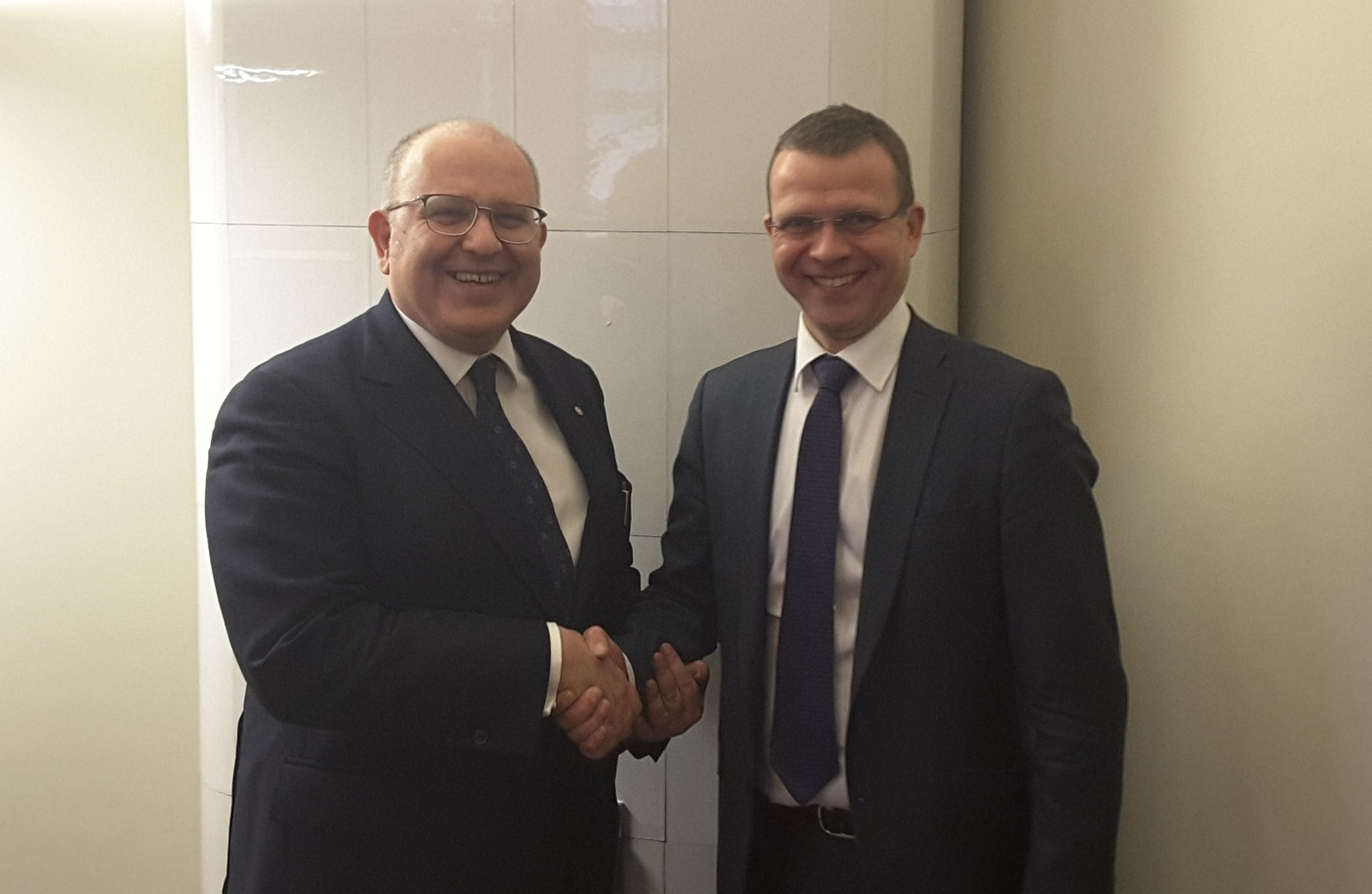
Orpo with Greek Alternate Foreign Minister Nikos Xydakis in February 2016

=== Minister of the Interior ===
During his tenure as Minister of the Interior, Orpo received support for his handling of the 2015 migration crisis from coalition partners in the anti-immigration Finns Party, as well as from opposition lawmakers.

=== Minister of Finance ===
In May 2016, Orpo announced that he would challenge the chair of the National Coalition Party and incumbent Minister of Finance Alexander Stubb in June's party conference. At the time, Orpo joined second-term parliamentarian Elina Valtonen in seeking to replace Stubb. In contrast to polyglot and outspoken Stubb, Orpo was widely seen as a careful consensus-seeker with little experience of international politics. Orpo received 441,4 votes against Stubb's 361 and was thus elected as the new chair for the party. Orpo soon announced that he would take Stubb's seat as the Minister of Finance. He was officially appointed as the Minister of Finance on 22 June 2016.

In June 2017, Prime Minister Juha Sipilä and Orpo announced said they could not cooperate with their parties' third coalition partner, the Finns Party, anymore, citing differences in core values and in the immigration and EU policies. For both Sipilä and Orpo, at stake were major healthcare and local government reform, which were key to their plan to balance public finances.

In addition to his national political roles, Orpo co-chaired (alongside Valdis Dombrovskis) the EPP Economic and Financial Affairs Ministers Meeting, which gathers the centre-right European People's Party (EPP) ministers ahead of meetings of the Economic and Financial Affairs Council (ECOFIN).

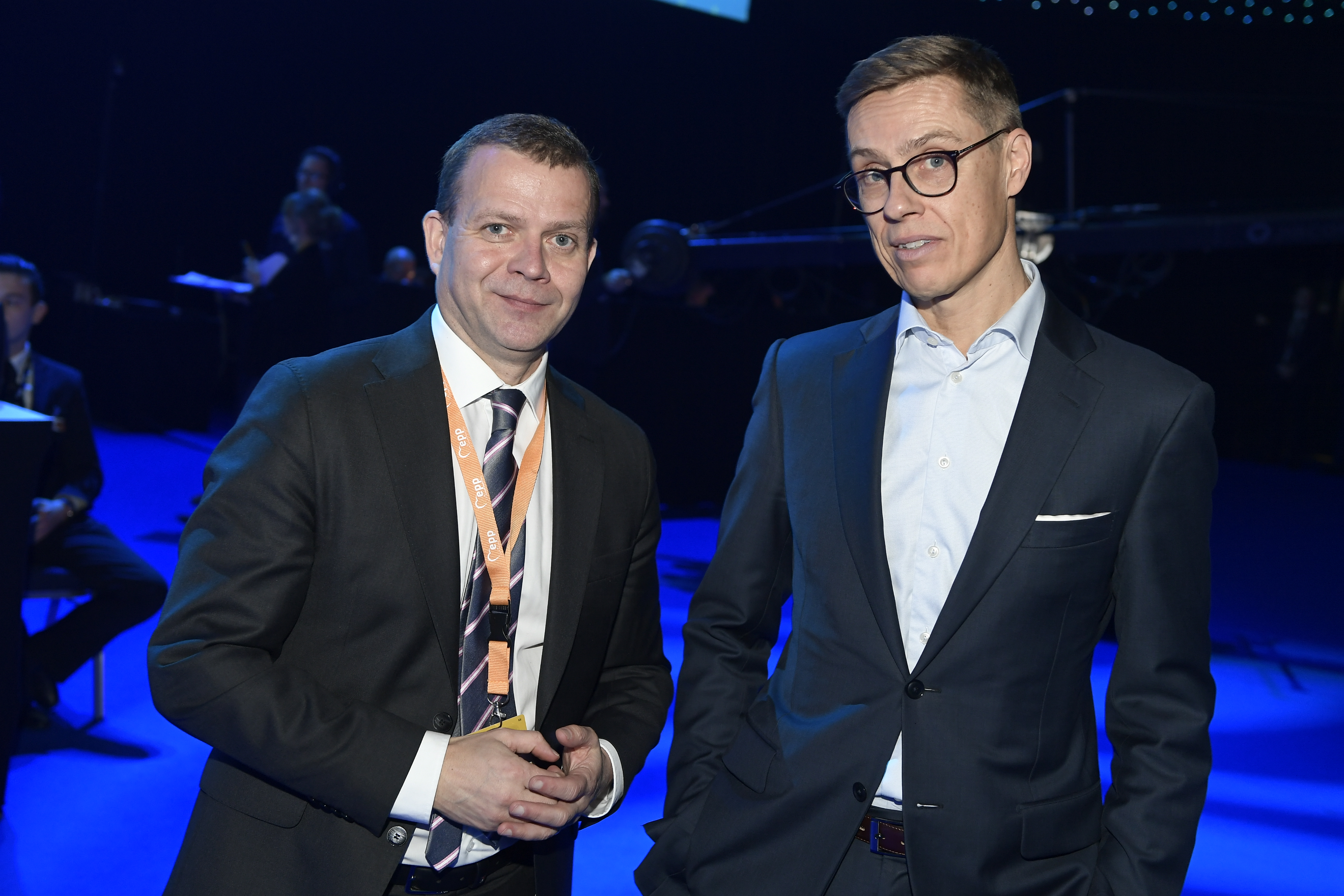
Petteri Orpo with Alexander Stubb (2019)

=== Opposition politics ===
In December 2019 Orpo attempted a vote of no-confidence in the incumbent government. This would then cause new elections, which Orpo hoped on winning. The incumbent government was accused of malpractice in responding to problems in the labor market. Later, Prime Minister Antti Rinne resigned, and Kulmuni publicly refused to join the National Coalition Party's plan of premature elections.

=== Chairman of the Defence Committee 2022 ===
When the chairman of the Defence Committee of the Parliament Ilkka Kanerva died in the spring of 2022, the National Coalition Party parliamentary group nominated Orpo as his successor. The chairman of the National Coalition Party parliamentary group Kai Mykkänen announced that the party wanted its chairman to be centrally involved in Finland's NATO process and that Orpo would act as the chairman of the committee specifically during the NATO membership process. The fact that the party chairman also served as the chairman of the committee was considered exceptional. Orpo was elected as a member of the committee on 22 April 2022 and the committee elected him as its chairman on 26 April. Orpo told the target schedule that the NATO process would be completed by the summer, after which another National Coalition Party MP would be elected to the position. On September 9, 2022, Orpo stepped down as chairman of the committee and was succeeded by Antti Häkkänen.

=== Prime Minister of Finland (2023–present) ===
==== 2023 parliamentary elections ====
On 2 April 2023, Orpo's National Coalition Party won the 2023 Finnish parliamentary election. The party had led the polls since mid-2021 and finished first, with 20.8% of the votes and 48 seats in the parliament, increasing their total by 10 seats. This was the party's third highest result in its history. Orpo began government formation talks when the new parliament and President convened the week after Easter and named him as the lead negotiator.

Orpo campaigned on a platform of reducing Finland's government debt and the yearly budget deficit as well as reducing income taxes. He defines himself as a "fiscal conservative."

Orpo was elected by parliamentary groups as the Speaker of the Parliament of Finland on 12 April on a temporary basis until a new government is formed.

On 27 April, it was announced that Orpo would begin final negotiations with the Finns Party, the Swedish People's Party and the Christian Democrats to form a coalition government. This coalition of parties was confirmed on 15 June, with the government formation, including the names of its ministers, announced on 17 June. His party received eight cabinet posts, the Finns Party seven (including the Ministries of Finance, the Interior and Justice), while the Swedish People's Party and the Christian Democrats shared the remaining five. It is Finland's most right-wing government since the end of the Second World War; indeed, it is one of the few occasions since the return of peace that one side of the Finnish political spectrum has been able to form a government on its own.

==== Tenure ====
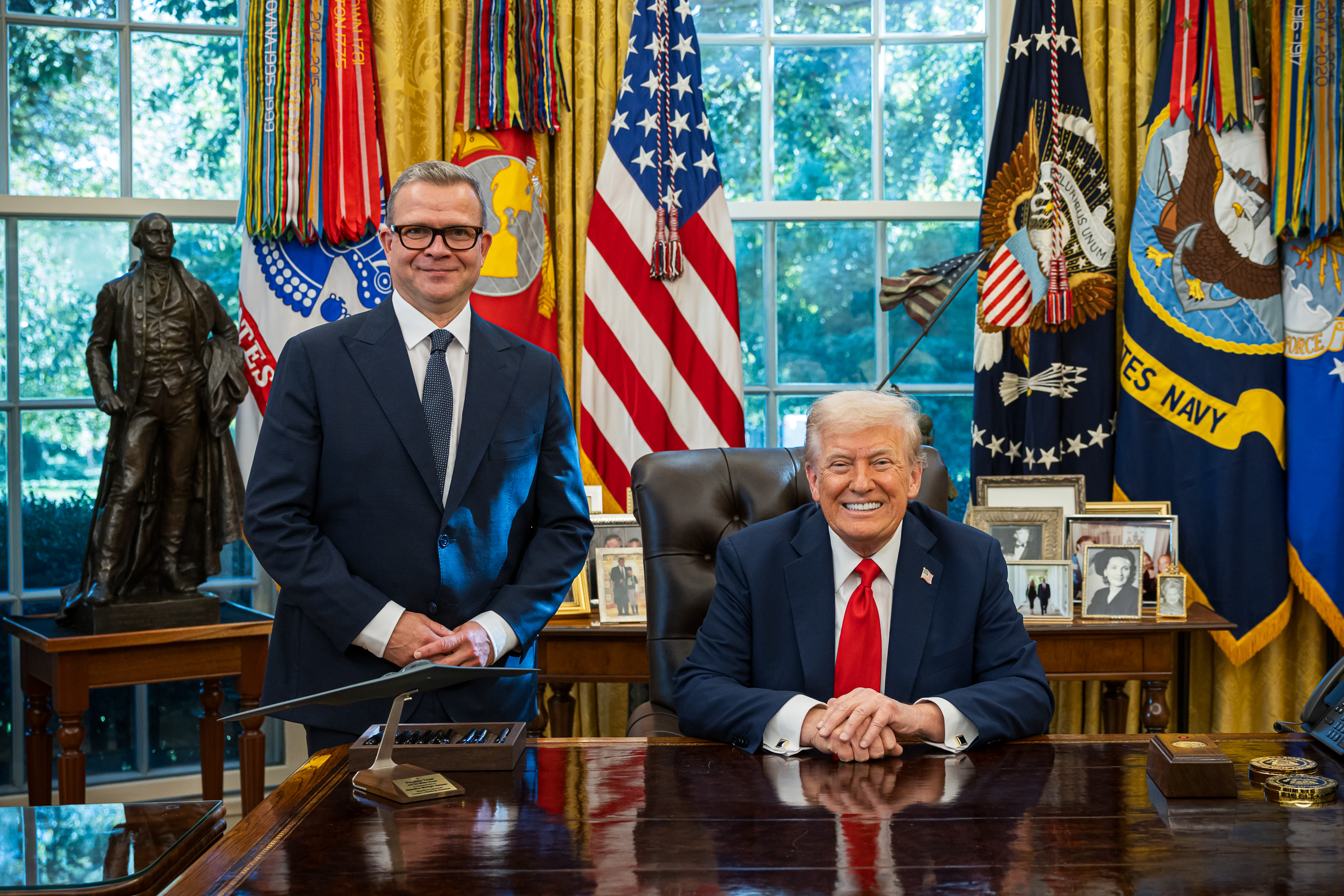
Orpo with US President Donald Trump, 9 October 2025

Orpo became Prime Minister of Finland on 20 June 2023. The government's roadmap makes cutting public spending a priority. Petteri Orpo announced a €6 billion cut in the state budget, stating that the greatest danger threatening Finland was "the debt crisis" (it stands at 74% of GDP), and reforms, some of which "are going to hurt".

The coalition is betting on unprecedented cuts in social benefits. For example, the conditions for receiving unemployment benefit will be tightened, a one-day waiting period will be introduced at the start of sick leave, and access to housing benefit will be restricted. In addition, the right to strike will be restricted and a fine introduced for unauthorized work stoppages. The government agreement also provides for easier redundancies and the use of fixed-term contracts, while increasing investment in vocational training.

These announcements were welcomed by employers, who see in the program the reforms they have been "demanding for decades", but the unions denounced "an attack on employees". While the center-left and left-wing parties also denounced a "difficult program, especially for people on low and middle incomes" (Sanna Marin) and "the most anti-worker government in Finnish history" (Li Andersson), Finns Party leader Riikka Purra declared that she "saw no divergence between the interests of employers and employees".

With regard to immigration, reception conditions will be restricted. Asylum will no longer be granted on a temporary basis, and six full years' residence in Finland will be required to apply for a permanent residence permit. Family reunification and access to naturalization will be restricted. In addition, the country will only accept 500 refugees per year under the relocation scheme, compared with 1,050 at present. Immigrant workers will no longer have the same privileges as permanent residents, and will have to leave the country within three months of being laid off.

During the first month of his cabinet, there were numerous scandals regarding past writings by the Finns Party ministers, including the Deputy Prime Minister Riikka Purra. The scandal around Nazi-connected joking and potential connections to neo-Nazi organisations of Minister of Economic Affairs Vilhelm Junnila led to him resigning. Orpo's Cabinet's party Swedish People's Party of Finland have criticized Orpo for too weak leadership during the Junnila scandal. Orpo's leadership among the various controversies was also questioned and criticized widely in Finnish and international media. In March 2024 Orpo stated in Politico that the Finns are not a far-right party anymore in his opinion. After Orpo opened an anti racist campaign of his cabinet in August 2024 Deputy Prime Minister Purra stated the Finns Party likely do not participate as a party and added "better immigration policy" as an example of her anti-racist deeds.

He condemned Hamas' actions during the Gaza war and expressed his support to Israel and its right to self-defense. The Orpo cabin has approved the two-state solution as solution of the Israeli–Palestinian conflict. In August 2025 Orpo stated that the two-state solution will be realized when all Western and Arab countries are committed to supporting the existence of both the Palestinian and Israeli states.

Although in 2019 Orpo was co-founder of Coalition of Finance Ministers for Climate Action his cabinet's Finance Minister Riikka Purra stated in January 2024 that climate matters are not responsibility of the Finance Minister.

In 2024, Orpo condemned racist attacks made against Daniela Owusu, a Finnish-Ghanaian woman who was elected to serve as Saint Lucy for the national Saint Lucy's Day celebrations, and issued a formal apology to Owusu.

After the US strikes on Iranian nuclear sites in June 2025, Orpo said, "it is important for Finland that Iran does not develop a nuclear weapon and that no new nuclear-weapon state emerges in the world."

In December 2025, Miss Finland at the time, Sarah Dzafce, was reported to have made racist remarks on social media directed against East Asians. Members of parliament endorsed these views, and Orpo issued statements that appeared to shield them. At first Orpo called remarks "chidish" but not "racist". After the comments spread widely in East Asia, Orpo apologized for them. Orpo cabinet's Debuty Prime Minister party Finns first deputy chair Teemu Keskisarja has commented that there is no point in apologizing for the eye-stretching photos.

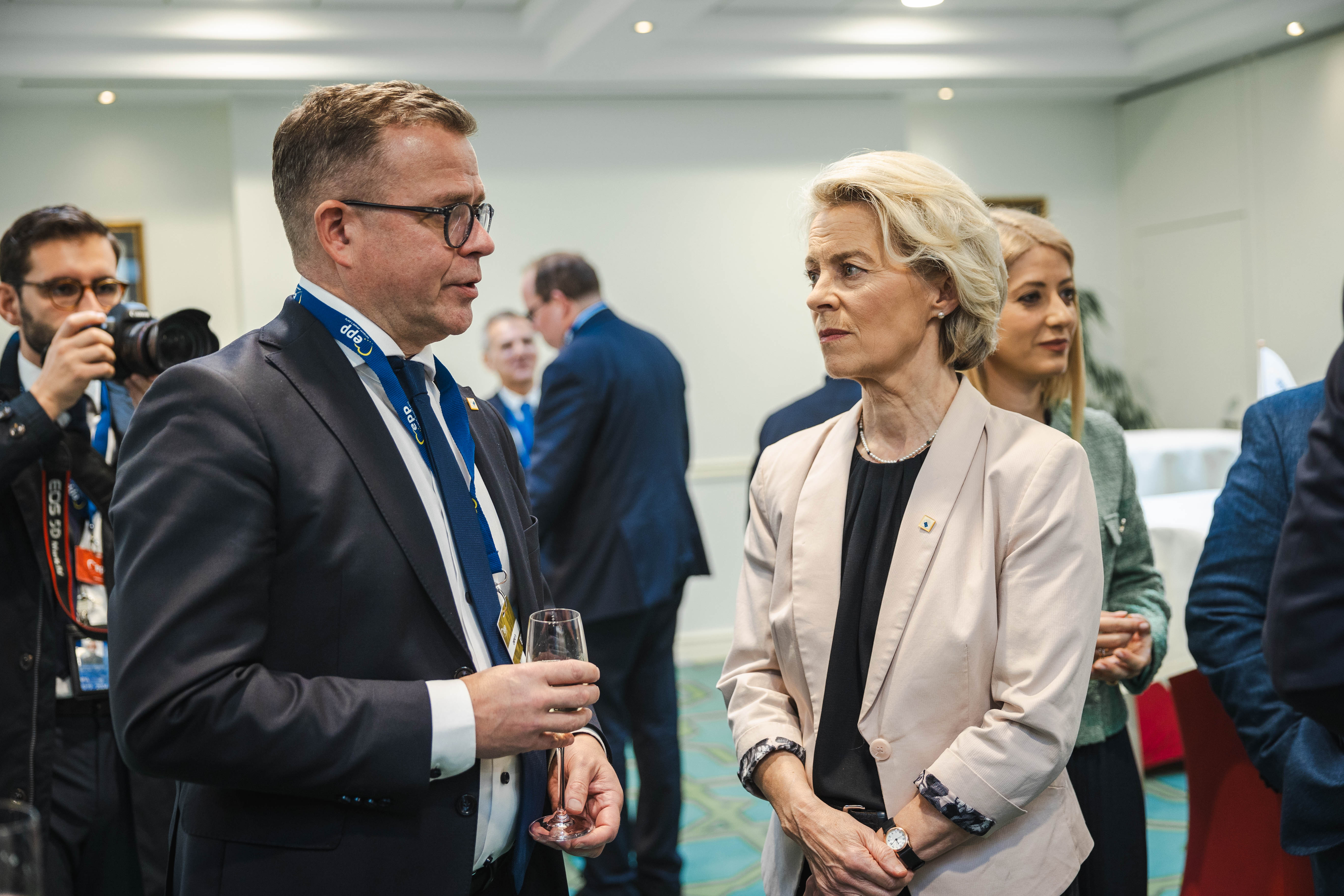
Orpo with President of the European Commission Ursula von der Leyen, at an EPP summit on 29 June 2023

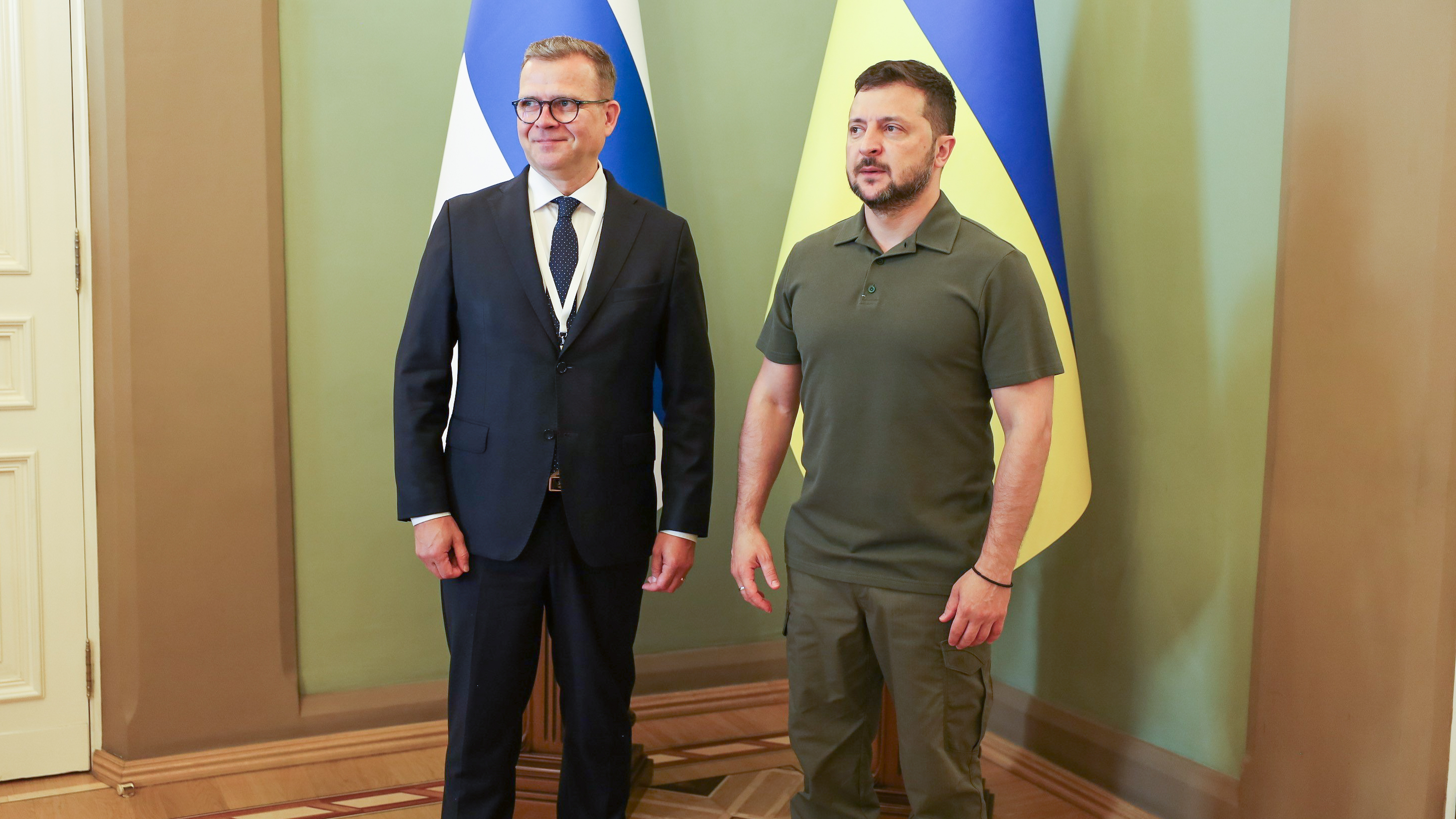
Orpo with Ukrainian President Volodymyr Zelenskyy, 23 August 2023

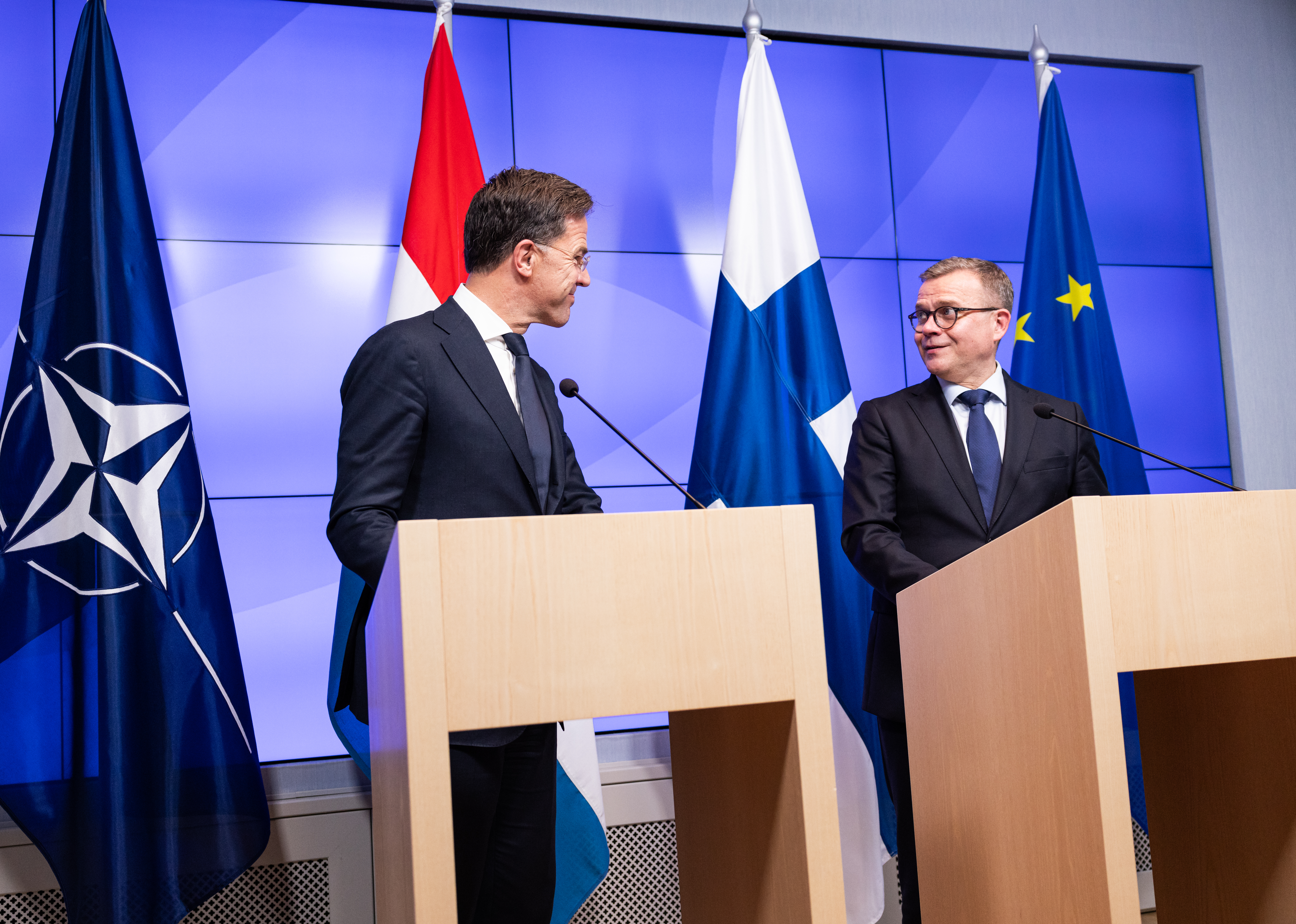
Orpo with Mark Rutte in 2024

Orpo with President of the European Council António Costa in 2025

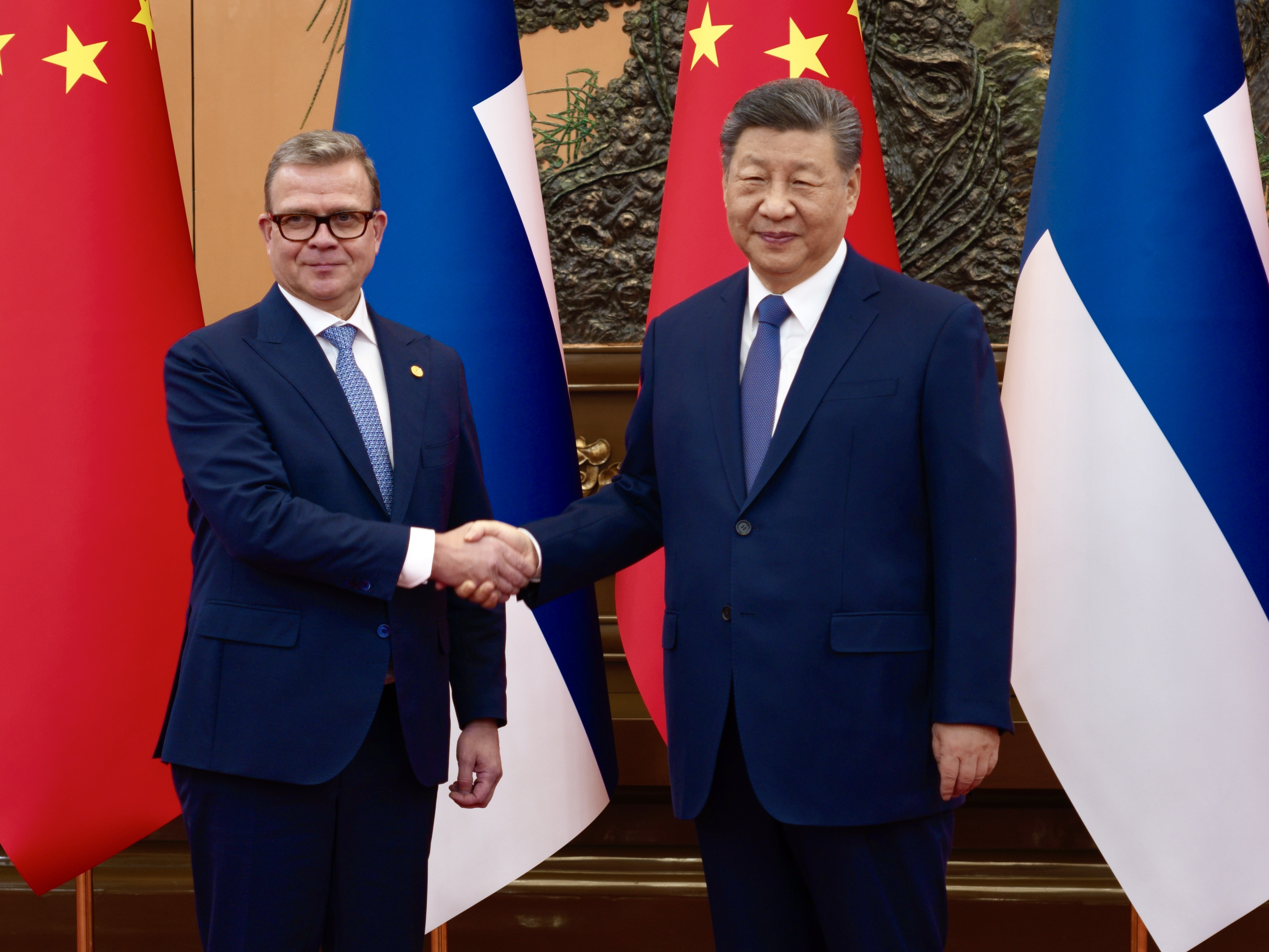
Orpo with Chinese leader Xi Jinping in Beijing, China, 27 January 2026

== Personal life ==
Orpo is known for his limited ability to speak English, unlike the majority of the population in Finland and Sweden.

== Other activities ==
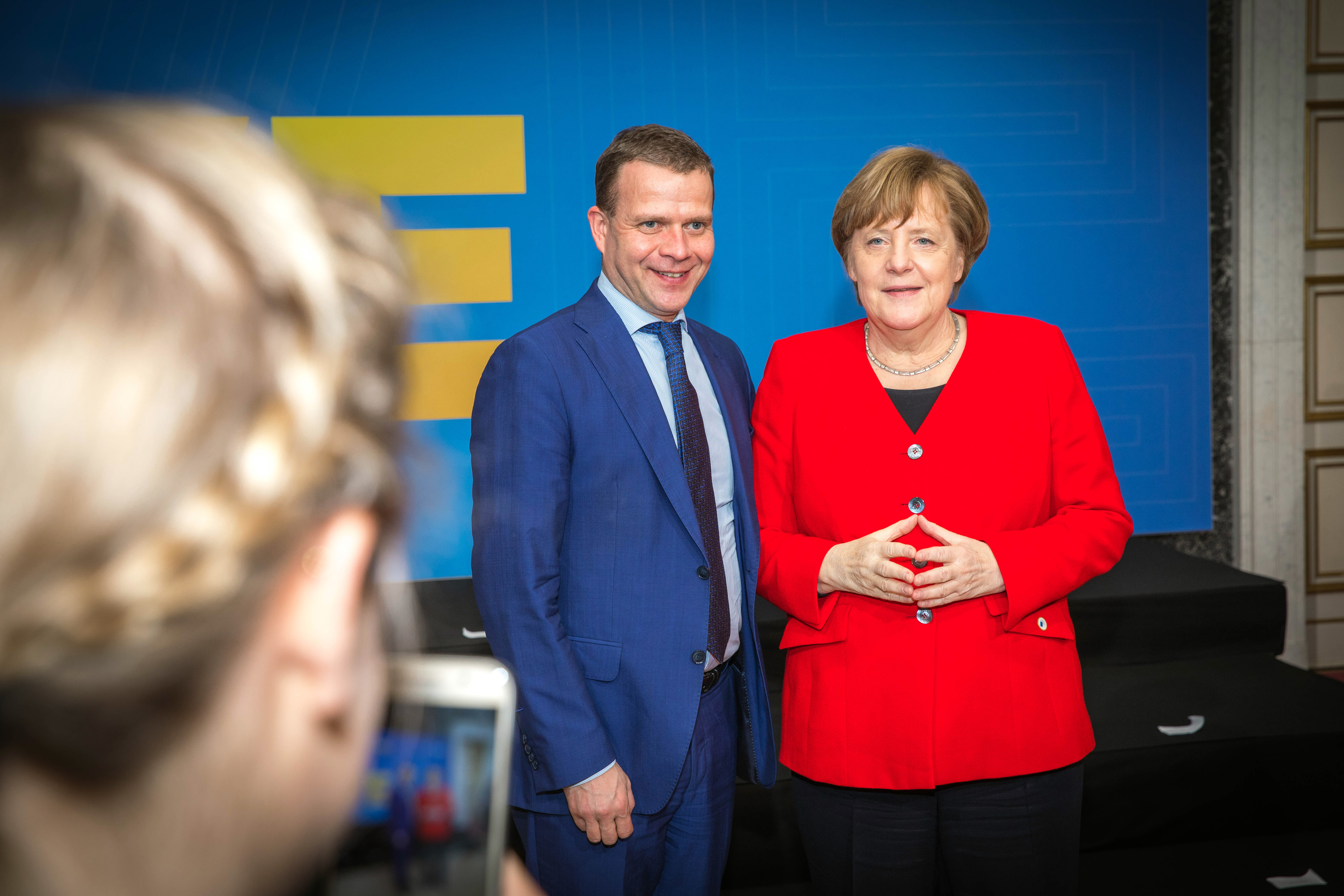
Orpo with Chancellor of Germany Angela Merkel, in EPP Summit in Brussels, 21 March 2019

=== European Union organizations ===
- European Investment Bank (EIB), Ex-Officio Member of the Board of Governors (2016–2019)
- European Stability Mechanism (ESM), Member of the Board of Governors (2016–2019)

=== International organizations ===
- Asian Infrastructure Investment Bank (AIIB), Ex-Officio Member of the Board of Governors (2016–2019)
- European Bank for Reconstruction and Development (EBRD), Ex-Officio Member of the Board of Governors (2016–2019)
- Joint World Bank-IMF Development Committee, Member (2018–2019)
- Multilateral Investment Guarantee Agency (MIGA), World Bank Group, Ex-Officio Member of the Board of Governors (2016–2019)
- Nordic Investment Bank (NIB), Ex-Officio Member of the Board of Governors (2016–2019)
- World Bank, Ex-Officio Member of the Board of Governors (2016–2019)

== Honors and awards ==
- Order of the White Rose of Finland (Finland, 2016)
- Military merit medal (Finland)
- Medal of Merit in silver, of the Finnish Sports (Finland, 2022)
- Order of Merit of the Republic of Poland (Poland, 2015)
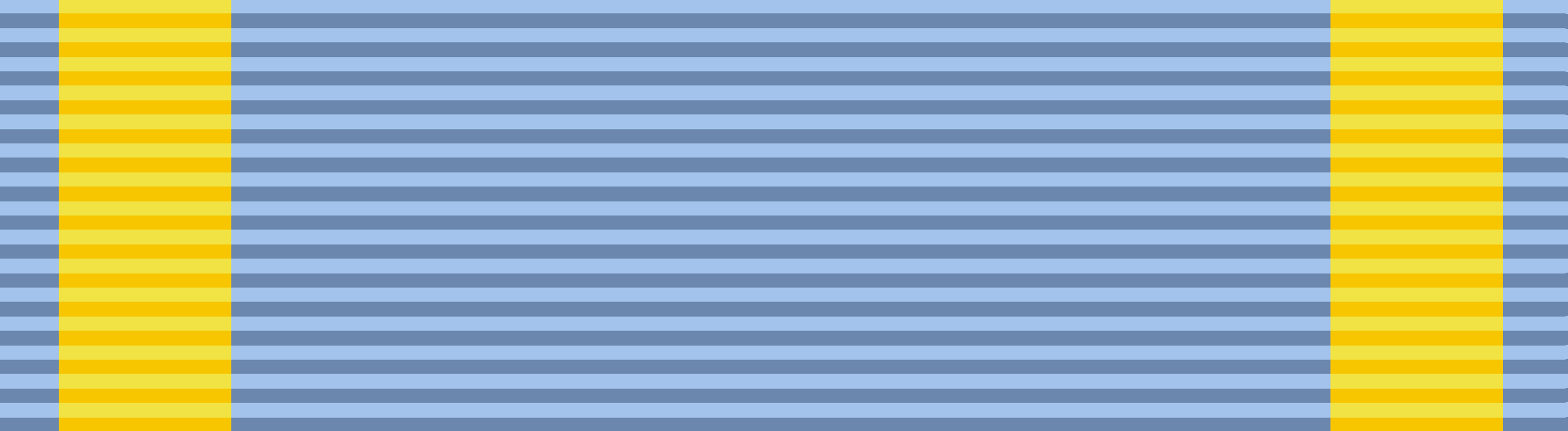
- Order of Prince Yaroslav the Wise (Ukraine, 2026)

== See also ==
- List of current heads of state and government
- List of heads of the executive by approval rating

== Notes ==
Political offices
Preceded by Jari Koskinen	Minister of Agriculture and Forestry; 2014–2015	Succeeded by Kimmo Tiilikainen
Preceded by Päivi Räsänen	Minister of the Interior; 2015–2016	Succeeded by Paula Risikko
Preceded by Alexander Stubb	Minister of Finance; 2016–2019	Succeeded by Mika Lintilä
Preceded by Timo Soini	Deputy Prime Minister of Finland; 2017–2019	Succeeded by Mika Lintilä
Preceded by Matti Vanhanen	Speaker of the Parliament of Finland; 2023	Succeeded by Jussi Halla-aho
Preceded by Sanna Marin	Prime Minister of Finland; 2023–present	Incumbent
Party political offices
Preceded by Alexander Stubb	Leader of the National Coalition Party; 2016–present	Incumbent
Order of precedence
Preceded by Jussi Halla-aho as Speaker of the Parliament	Order of precedence of Finland; Prime Minister	Succeeded by Tatu Leppänen as President of the Supreme Court
