= Rinne cabinet =

75th cabinet of Finland

Rinne's Cabinet
- 75th Cabinet of Finland

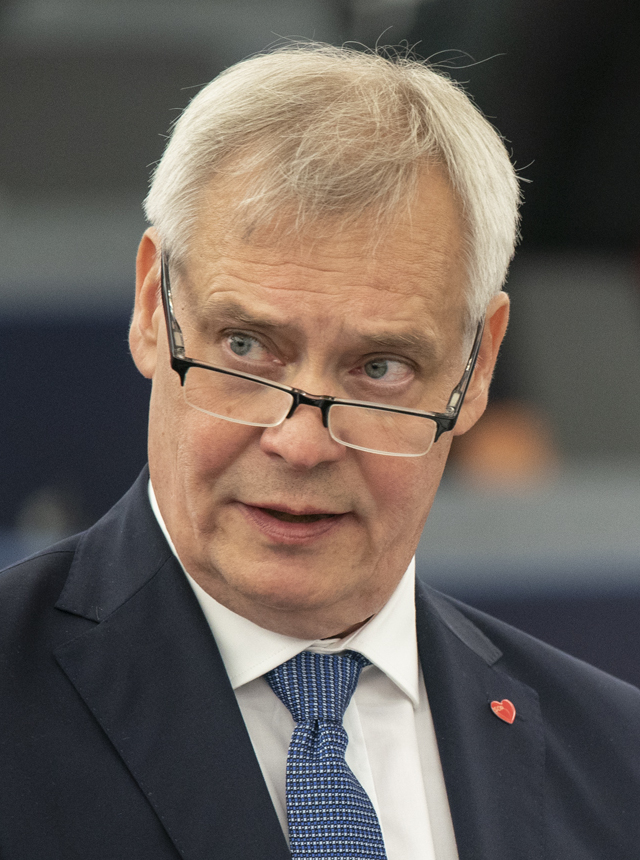
- Date formed: 6 June 2019
- Date dissolved: 10 December 2019

People and organisations
- Head of state: Sauli Niinistö
- Head of government: Antti Rinne
- No. of ministers: 19
- Member parties: Social Democratic Party; Centre Party; Green League; Left Alliance; Swedish People's Party
- Status in legislature: Majority government (coalition)
- Opposition party: Finns Party; National Coalition Party; Christian Democrats

History
- Election: 2019 parliamentary election
- Incoming formation: Social Democratic Party; Centre Party; Green League; Left Alliance; Swedish People's Party
- Predecessor: Sipilä Cabinet
- Successor: Marin Cabinet

The cabinet of Antti Rinne was the 75th government of Finland. It was formed following the parliamentary election of 2019 and was formally appointed by President Sauli Niinistö on 6 June 2019. The cabinet consisted of a coalition formed by the Social Democratic Party, the Centre Party, the Green League, the Left Alliance, and the Swedish People's Party. The cabinet's Prime Minister was Antti Rinne.

This government was the first centre-left coalition to lead Finland since the Lipponen II Cabinet in 2003. The Rinne coalition had a total of 117 seats (58.5%) in the 200-seat parliament.

Rinne announced the resignation of his government due to mishandling a postal strike on 3 December 2019. It continued its term as a caretaker government until a new government, the Marin Cabinet, was formed.

== Ministers ==
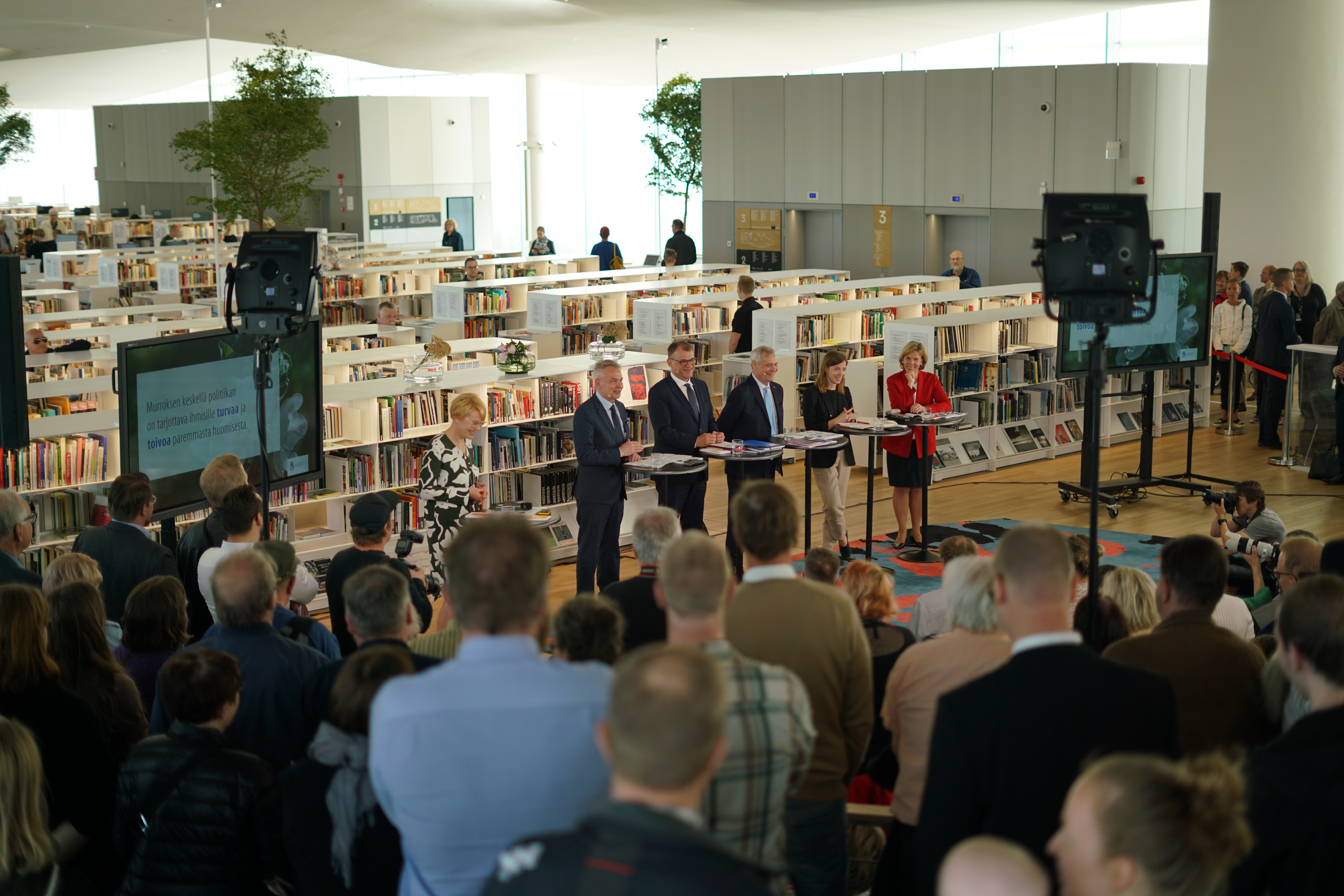
Rinne Cabinet announcing their Government Programme at Oodi, June 2019

The Rinne cabinet comprised 19 ministers: seven ministers from the Social Democratic Party, five ministers from the Centre Party, three from the Green League, and two each from the Left Alliance and the Swedish People's Party.

The constitution requires ministers to be "honest and competent". The nomination of Centre's Antti Kaikkonen as the Minister of Defence drew considerable controversy due to his previous conviction from political corruption. Historically, the interpretation of the "honest and competent" clause has been permissive: the most salient example would be Aarre Simonen, who was also successfully appointed in 1966 despite his conviction in 1961, also from corruption. Rinne had the question checked with the Chancellor of Justice and Kaikkonen was cleared to proceed. The motivation was that there had already been two elections in between where Kaikkonen had been re-elected, and Kaikkonen had been law-abiding since.

Cabinet members
Portfolio	Minister	Took office	Left office	Party
Prime Minister	Antti Rinne	6 June 2019	10 December 2019	SDP
Minister deputising for the Prime Minister	Mika Lintilä	6 June 2019	12 September 2019	Centre
Minister deputising for the Prime Minister	Katri Kulmuni	12 September 2019	10 December 2019	Centre
Minister of Finance	Mika Lintilä	6 June 2019	10 December 2019	Centre
Minister for Foreign Affairs	Pekka Haavisto	6 June 2019	10 December 2019	Green
Minister of the Interior	Maria Ohisalo	6 June 2019	10 December 2019	Green
Minister for Development Cooperation and Foreign Trade	Ville Skinnari	6 June 2019	10 December 2019	SDP
Minister of Justice	Anna-Maja Henriksson	6 June 2019	10 December 2019	RKP
Minister of Employment	Timo Harakka	6 June 2019	10 December 2019	SDP
Minister of Defence	Antti Kaikkonen	6 June 2019	10 December 2019	Centre
Minister of Local Government and Ownership Steering	Sirpa Paatero	6 June 2019	29 november 2019	SDP
Minister of Transport and Communications	Sanna Marin	6 June 2019	10 December 2019	SDP
Minister of Education	Li Andersson	6 June 2019	10 December 2019	Left Alliance
Minister of Science and Culture	Annika Saarikko	6 June 2019	9 August 2019	Centre
Minister of Science and Culture	Hanna Kosonen	9 August 2019	10 December 2019	Centre
Minister for European Affairs	Tytti Tuppurainen	6 June 2019	10 December 2019	SDP
Minister of the Environment and Climate Change	Krista Mikkonen	6 June 2019	10 December 2019	Green
Minister of Agriculture and Forestry	Jari Leppä	6 June 2019	10 December 2019	Centre
Minister of Economic Affairs	Katri Kulmuni	6 June 2019	10 December 2019	Centre
Minister of Social Affairs and Health	Aino-Kaisa Pekonen	6 June 2019	10 December 2019	Left Alliance
Minister of Family Affairs and Social Services	Krista Kiuru	6 June 2019	10 December 2019	SDP
Minister of Nordic Cooperation and Equality	Thomas Blomqvist	6 June 2019	10 December 2019	RKP

== See also ==
- Finland postal strike controversy 2019

Preceded by Juha Sipilä's cabinet	Antti Rinne's cabinet 6 June 2019 — 10 December 2019	Succeeded by Sanna Marin's cabinet
