= Marin cabinet =

76th cabinet of Finland

Marin’s Cabinet
- 76th Cabinet of Finland

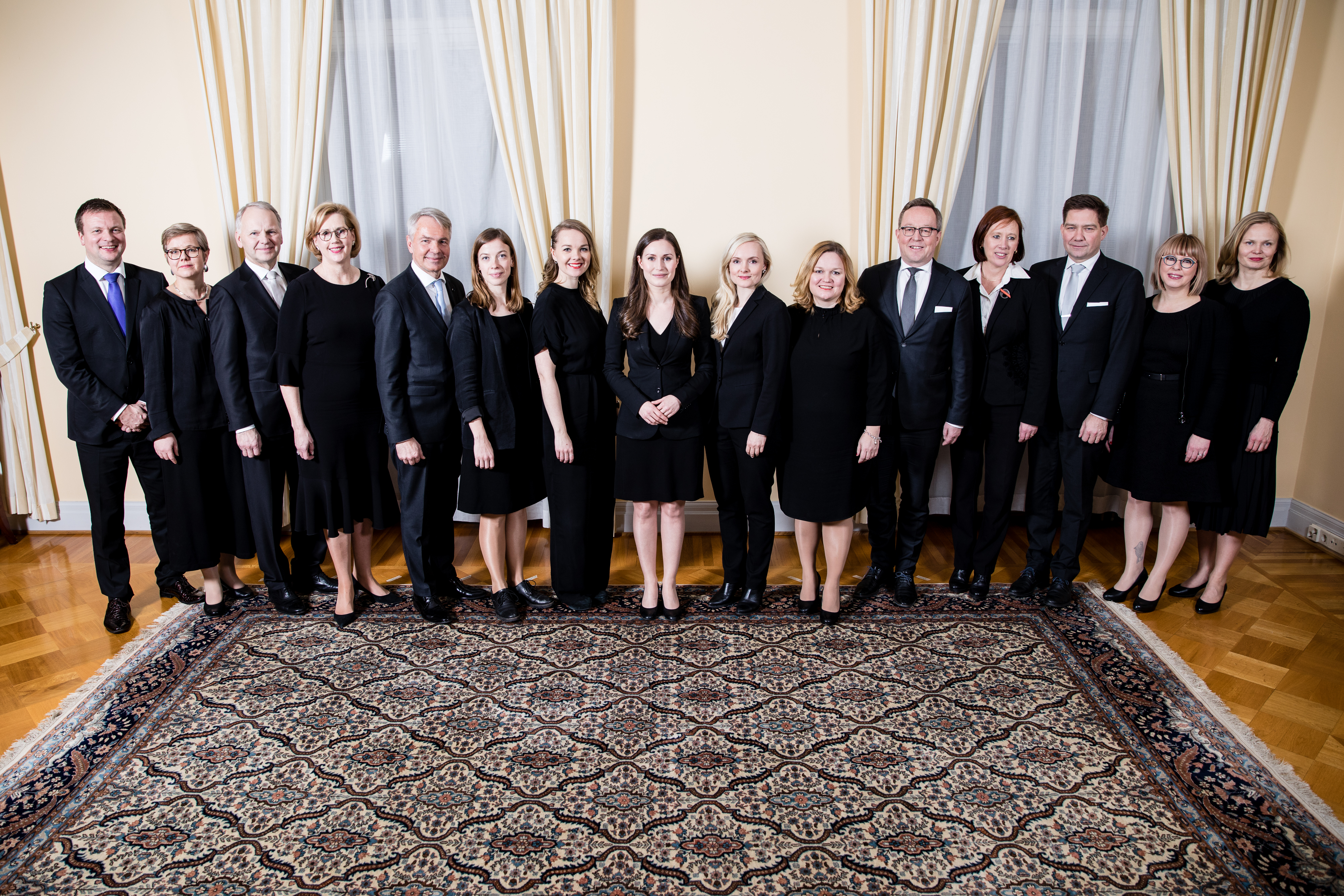
- Date formed: 10 December 2019
- Date dissolved: 20 June 2023

People and organisations
- Head of state: Sauli Niinistö
- Head of government: Sanna Marin
- No. of ministers: 19
- Member parties: Social Democratic Party; Centre Party; Green League; Left Alliance; Swedish People's Party
- Status in legislature: Majority government (coalition)
- Opposition parties: Finns Party; National Coalition Party; Christian Democrats; Movement Now; Power Belongs to the People

History
- Incoming formation: National Coalition Party; Finns Party; Swedish People's Party; Christian Democrats
- Election: 2019
- Predecessor: Rinne Cabinet
- Successor: Orpo Cabinet

The cabinet of Sanna Marin was the 76th government of Finland. It was formed following the collapse of the Rinne Cabinet and officially took office on 10 December 2019. The cabinet headed by Sanna Marin consisted of a coalition formed by the Social Democratic Party, the Centre Party, the Green League, the Left Alliance, and the Swedish People's Party.

== Ministers ==
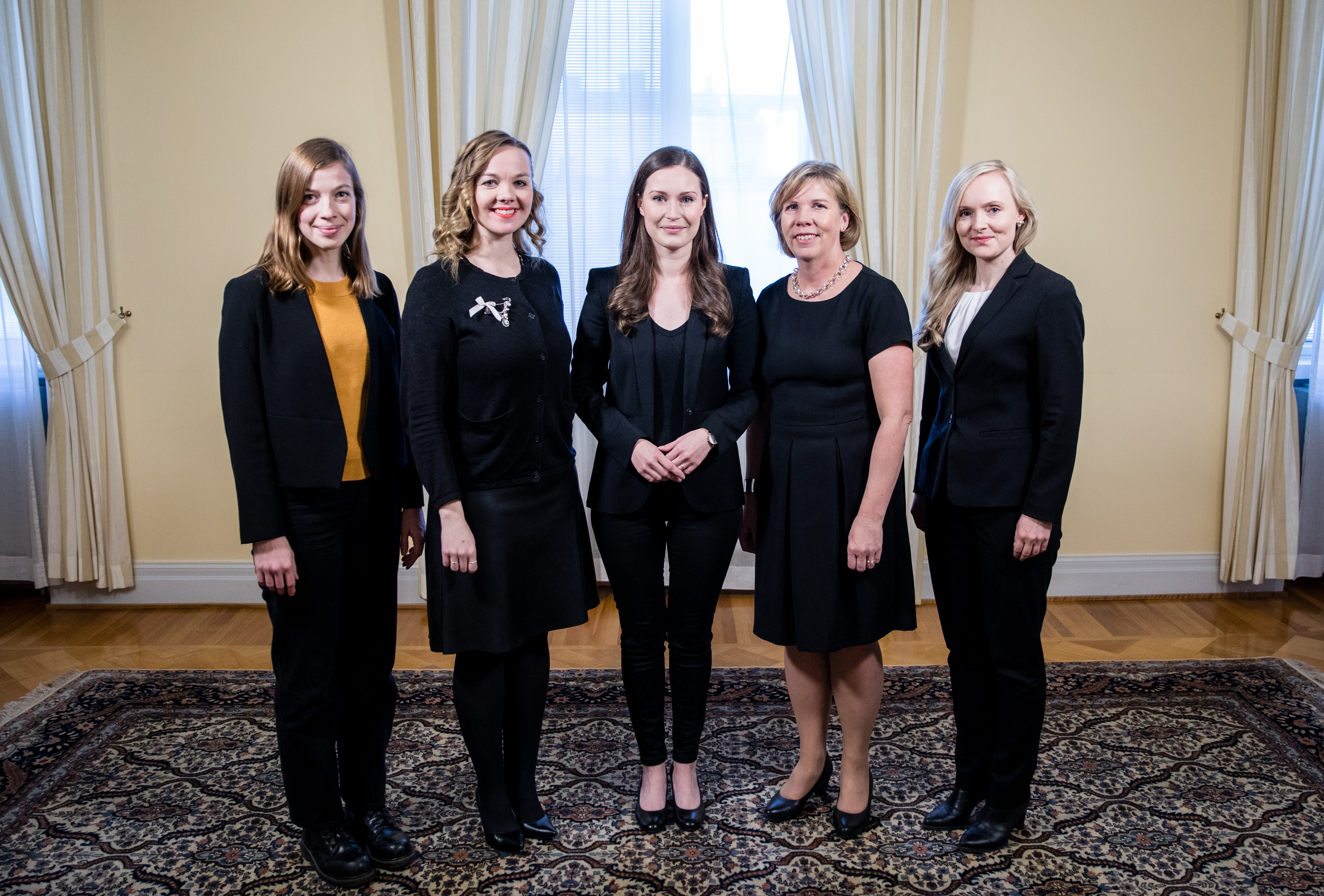
The five party leaders of the Marin Cabinet on 19 December 2019: Andersson, Kulmuni, Marin, Henriksson and Ohisalo

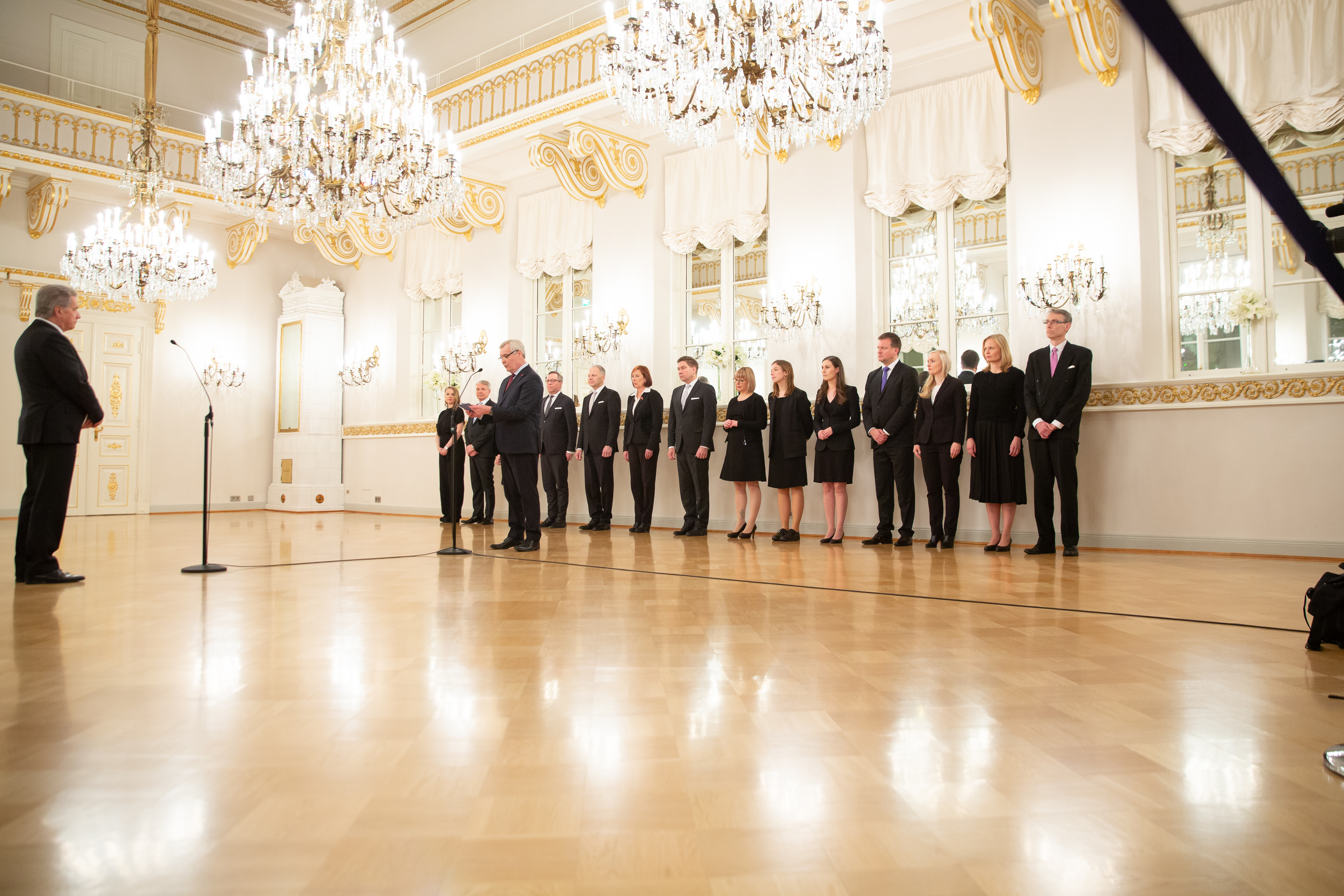
The full cabinet on 10 December 2019 as Rinne resigns

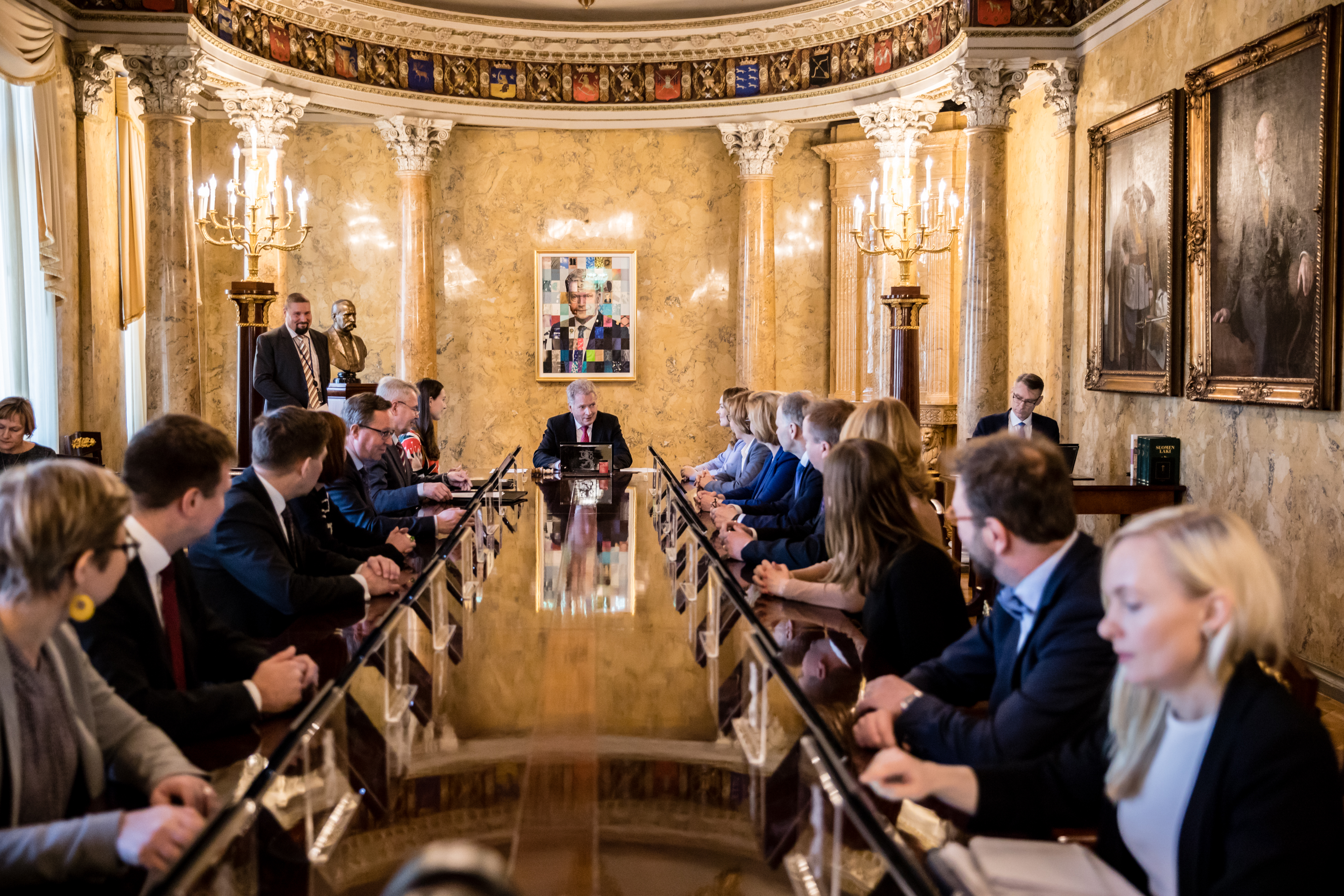
From the table is President Sauli Niinistö

There were a total of 19 ministers in Marin's cabinet: seven ministers from the Social Democratic Party, five from the Centre Party, three from the Green League, and two each from the Left Alliance and Swedish People's Party.

The composition mostly resembled that of the preceding Rinne Cabinet, although the former prime minister, Antti Rinne, did not have a position in the new government. The leader of the Centre Party, Katri Kulmuni, exchanged her Rinne-era portfolio as the Minister of Economic Affairs for the combined position of the Minister of Finance and the Minister deputising for the Prime Minister, switching places with Mika Lintilä. The latter portfolio carries significant veto power over government finances, and its holder is effectively the government's second-in-command. This transfer solidified Kulmuni's position as the leader of the Centre Party – a position which she had assumed only three months before the formation of Marin's government. Sirpa Paatero, the Social Democratic minister previously responsible for local government and ownership steering, was readmitted into the government despite her resignation from the Rinne Cabinet just days before. Ownership steering responsibilities were given to Tytti Tuppurainen, the Minister of European Affairs. SDP's Tuula Haatainen, the only new minister in Marin's government, took over as the Minister of Employment from Timo Harakka, and Harakka was given Sanna Marin's former portfolio of the Minister of Transport and Communications. All other portfolios were unchanged. The portfolio assignments as of July 2021 were:

Portfolio	Minister	Took office	Left office	Party
Prime Minister	Sanna Marin	10 December 2019	20 June 2023	SDP
Minister deputising for the Prime Minister	Katri Kulmuni	10 December 2019	9 June 2020	Centre
Minister deputising for the Prime Minister	Matti Vanhanen	9 June 2020	10 September 2020	Centre
Minister deputising for the Prime Minister	Annika Saarikko	10 September 2020	20 June 2023	Centre
Minister of Finance	Katri Kulmuni	10 December 2019	9 June 2020	Centre
Minister of Finance	Matti Vanhanen	9 June 2020	27 May 2021	Centre
Minister of Finance	Annika Saarikko	27 May 2021	20 June 2023	Centre
Minister of the Interior	Maria Ohisalo	10 December 2019	19 November 2021	Green
Minister of the Interior	Krista Mikkonen	19 November 2021	20 June 2023	Green
Minister of Education	Li Andersson	10 December 2019	17 December 2020	Left Alliance
Minister of Education	Jussi Saramo	17 December 2020	29 June 2021	Left Alliance
Minister of Education	Li Andersson	29 June 2021	20 June 2023	Left Alliance
Minister of Justice	Anna-Maja Henriksson	10 December 2019	20 June 2023	RKP
Minister for Foreign Affairs	Pekka Haavisto	10 December 2019	20 June 2023	Green
Minister for Development Cooperation and Foreign Trade	Ville Skinnari	10 December 2019	20 June 2023	SDP
Minister of Employment	Tuula Haatainen	10 December 2019	20 June 2023	SDP
Minister of Defence	Antti Kaikkonen	10 December 2019	5 January 2023	Centre
Minister of Defence	Mikko Savola	5 January 2023	28 February 2023	Centre
Minister of Defence	Antti Kaikkonen	28 February 2023	20 June 2023	Centre
Minister of European Affairs and Ownership Steering	Tytti Tuppurainen	10 December 2019	20 June 2023	SDP
Minister of Local Government	Sirpa Paatero	10 December 2019	20 June 2023	SDP
Minister of Transport and Communications	Timo Harakka	10 December 2019	20 June 2023	SDP
Minister of Science and Culture	Hanna Kosonen	10 December 2019	6 August 2020	Centre
Minister of Science and Culture	Annika Saarikko	6 August 2020	27 May 2021	Centre
Minister of Science and Culture	Antti Kurvinen	27 May 2021	29 April 2022	Centre
Minister of Science and Culture	Petri Honkonen	29 April 2022	20 June 2023	Centre
Minister of the Environment and Climate Change	Krista Mikkonen	10 December 2019	19 November 2021	Green
Minister of the Environment and Climate Change	Emma Kari	19 November 2021	7 June 2022	Green
Minister of the Environment and Climate Change	Maria Ohisalo	7 June 2022	20 June 2023	Green
Minister of Agriculture and Forestry	Jari Leppä	10 December 2019	29 April 2022	Centre
Minister of Agriculture and Forestry	Antti Kurvinen	29 April 2022	20 June 2023	Centre
Minister of Economic Affairs	Mika Lintilä	10 December 2019	20 June 2023	Centre
Minister of Social Affairs and Health	Aino-Kaisa Pekonen	10 December 2019	29 June 2021	Left Alliance
Minister of Social Affairs and Health	Hanna Sarkkinen	29 June 2021	20 June 2023	Left Alliance
Minister of Family Affairs and Social Services	Krista Kiuru	10 December 2019	4 February 2022	SDP
Minister of Family Affairs and Social Services	Aki Lindén	4 February 2022	6 October 2022	SDP
Minister of Family Affairs and Social Services	Krista Kiuru	6 October 2022	20 June 2023	SDP
Minister of Nordic Cooperation and Equality	Thomas Blomqvist	10 December 2019	20 June 2023	RKP

== Controversies ==
=== Gender balance ===
When the Marin Cabinet was formed, professor Anne Holli, a political scientist at the University of Helsinki, pointed out that the cabinet was deviating from the principle of gender equality, specifically the Finnish convention of each gender being represented by at least 40% of ministers: with 12 of the 19 ministers women, men accounted for only 37%. Prime Minister Marin responded to the criticism by explaining that with five parties in the coalition, and each party responsible for their own ministerial nominations, it was not always possible to coordinate things to the extent of ensuring gender balance.

=== Repatriation of Al-Hawl refugees ===
On 11 December 2019, all opposition parties filed a motion leading to a vote of no-confidence over repatriation of Finnish women and children from the Syrian Al-Hawl refugee camp. The motion followed criticism over the evasive statements on the issue by the government and the accusations that the Minister of Foreign Affairs Pekka Haavisto had supplied inaccurate information to the Parliament. Haavisto had rejected assertions that detailed plans existed to bring Finnish citizens home, while Finnish national broadcasting company Yle broke news about official documents stating otherwise. Haavisto was also accused of pushing through a plan to bring the children back to Finland without their mothers' consent by sidelining a top ministry official in the process.

On 14 December 2019, Iltalehti released results of a survey in which 53% of people deemed Haavisto's actions wrong, while 32% saw them correct and 16% were unsure.

On 18 December 2019, the parliament voted 110–79 in favor of Haavisto's confidence. On the following day, 10 MPs filed a notion to the Constitutional Law Committee to request an inspection into the actions of Haavisto. On 19 February 2020, the Constitutional Law Committee announced that it was requesting the Prosecutor General to start a preliminary investigation into Haavisto's actions.

Minister of Finance Katri Kulmuni was further criticized over an Instagram poll, in which she asked whether to evacuate "children only" or "children and mothers" from the camp. After the post was panned by the public and representatives of human rights organizations, Kulmuni deleted the poll and apologized.

=== Katri Kulmuni's resignation ===
Katri Kulmuni was found to have misappropriated funds by buying training and consulting services for herself and billing two ministries for this. As a result, Kulmuni resigned and was replaced by Matti Vanhanen.

== Politics ==
=== Citizens' initiatives ===
The Marin Cabinet initiated a citizens' initiative for the implementation of an aviation tax in February 2020.

The Ministry of Finance studied the taxation of capital gains from Finland in emigration. In February 2020, the tax was implemented e.g. in Denmark, Norway and the Netherlands.

Preceded by Antti Rinne's cabinet	Sanna Marin's cabinet 10 December 2019 — 20 June 2023	Succeeded by Petteri Orpo's cabinet
