= Ville Skinnari =

Finnish politician and ice hockey player

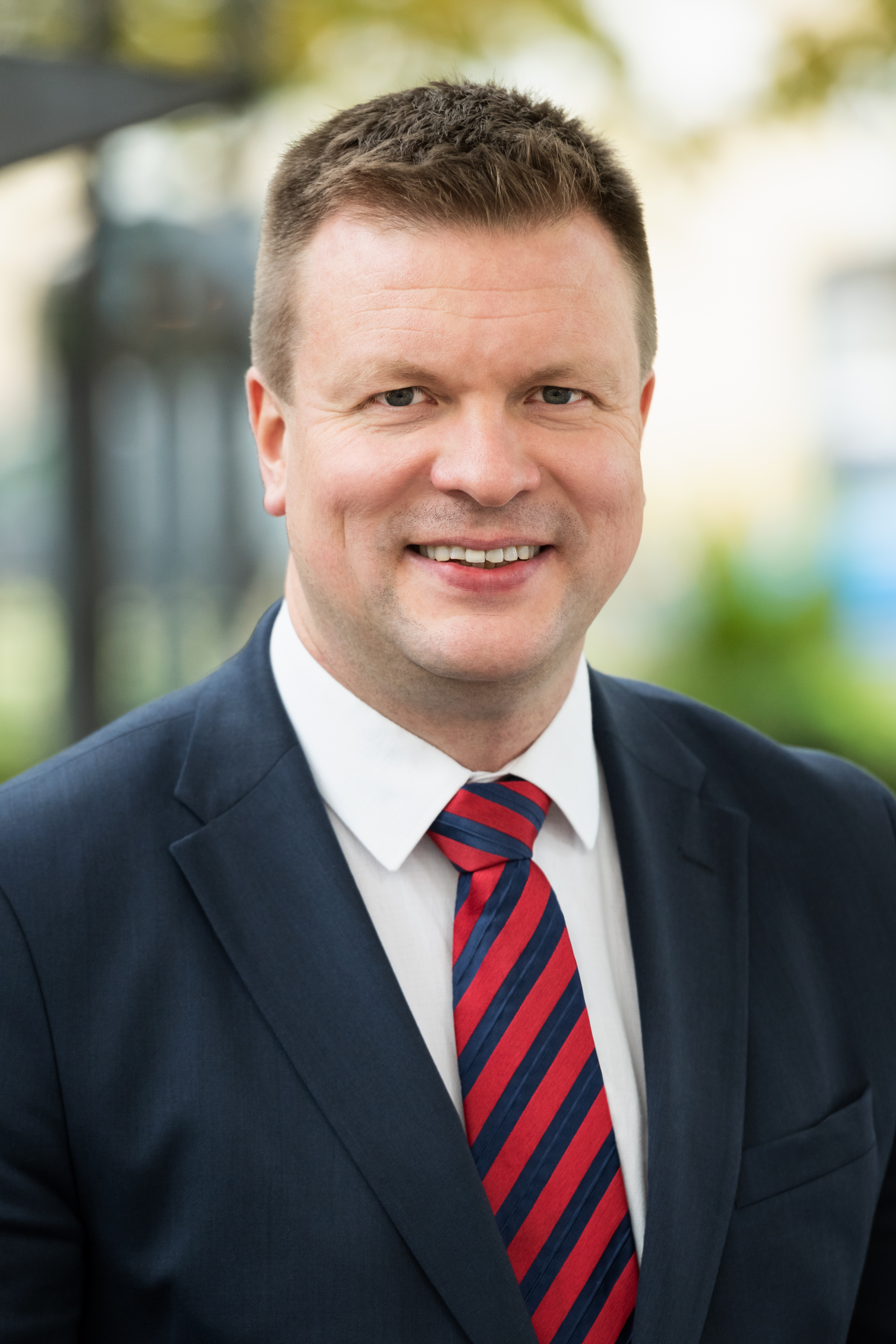
- Skinnari in 2019

Minister for Development Cooperation and Foreign Trade
- In office 6 June 2019 – 20 June 2023
- Prime Minister: Antti Rinne; Sanna Marin
- Preceded by: Anne-Mari Virolainen
- Succeeded by: Ville Tavio

Personal details
- Born: 21 February 1974 (age 52) Lahti, Päijät-Häme, Finland
- Party: Social Democratic Party

Ville Skinnari (born 21 February 1974) is a Finnish politician of the Social Democratic Party who has been serving as Minister for Development Cooperation and Foreign Trade in the cabinet of Prime Minister Antti Rinne and then in the cabinet of Prime Minister Sanna Marin from 2019 to 2023.

== Early career ==
Skinnari is a former professional ice hockey player who played in the Finnish Elite League for the club Reipas Lahti, in the Netherlands for the club Dordrecht Lions, and for the Coventry club Solihull Blaze in the British National League.

Before devoting his work to politics full time, Ville Skinnari has worked in various international positions in the field of international relations, business development, legal affairs, and trade, including a Helsinki based Attorney Office Lexia Ltd., technology start up in London, Japanese trading house Marubeni in Tokyo as well as working with Nokia Mobile Phone’s service business development as a subcontractor. Mr. Skinnari has also worked as a freelance journalist. From 1995 until 1999, Skinnari worked as a freelance journalist in Japan, the Netherlands, and the United Kingdom.

He completed his military service at the Finnish Military Sports School (1993) and achieved the rank of Second Lieutenant in 2016.

== Political career ==
Skinnari was elected to the Finnish Parliament for the Social Democratic Party in 2015, from the constituency of Häme (Tavastia). In 2019 he was re-elected to the parliament for the term 2019–2023.

Is his first season 2015-2019 his parliamentary roles included Memberships in the Economic Committee, the Constitutional Committee and the Nordic Council. He also acted as a Chair of the Parliament's Friendship Groups for Japan, Gulf Region and Central Asia.

Skinnari was appointed Minister for Development Cooperation and Foreign Trade in the cabinet of Prime Minister Antti Rinne in 2019. After the collapse of the cabinet in December 2019, Skinnari continued in the same position in the following Marin Cabinet.

Currently in the Finnish Parliament, he is a member of Member of the Foreign Affairs Committee, Member of the Constitutional Committee and a Deputy member of the Grand Committee (EU-affairs). Mr. Skinnari is also a Member of the OSCE Parliamentary Assembly. He also acts as a Chair of the Parliament's Friendship Groups for Gulf Region, China and Central Asia.

Mr. Skinnari has also been an active speaker at the international level, participating in various conferences and summits after leaving his position as a minister in 2023.

== Other activities ==
=== International organizations ===
- World Bank, Ex-Officio Alternate Member of the Board of Governors (since 2019)
- OECD/UNDP Tax Inspectors Without Borders (TIWB), Member of the Governing Board (since 2019)

=== Non-profit organizations ===
- Finnish Federation for Recreational Fishing, Chair (2017–2019)
- Hockey Unlimited, Member of the Board (2014–2019)
- Lahti Energia Oy, Vice-Chair of the Board (2013–2017)
- Chair of the School Meal Coalition with the World Food Programme (WFP) 2021-2023
