= 2017 Social Democratic Party of Finland leadership election =

- 4 February 2017
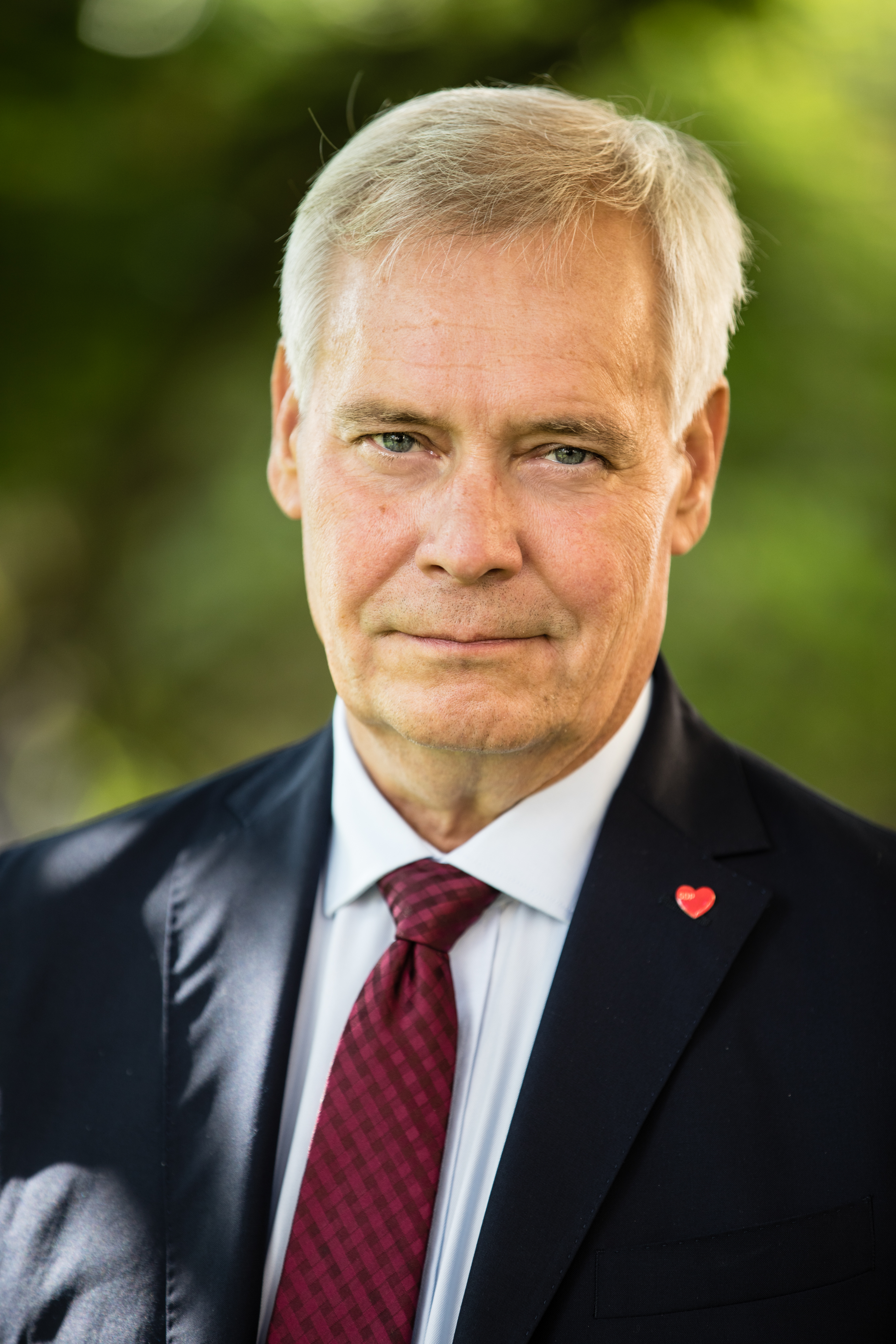

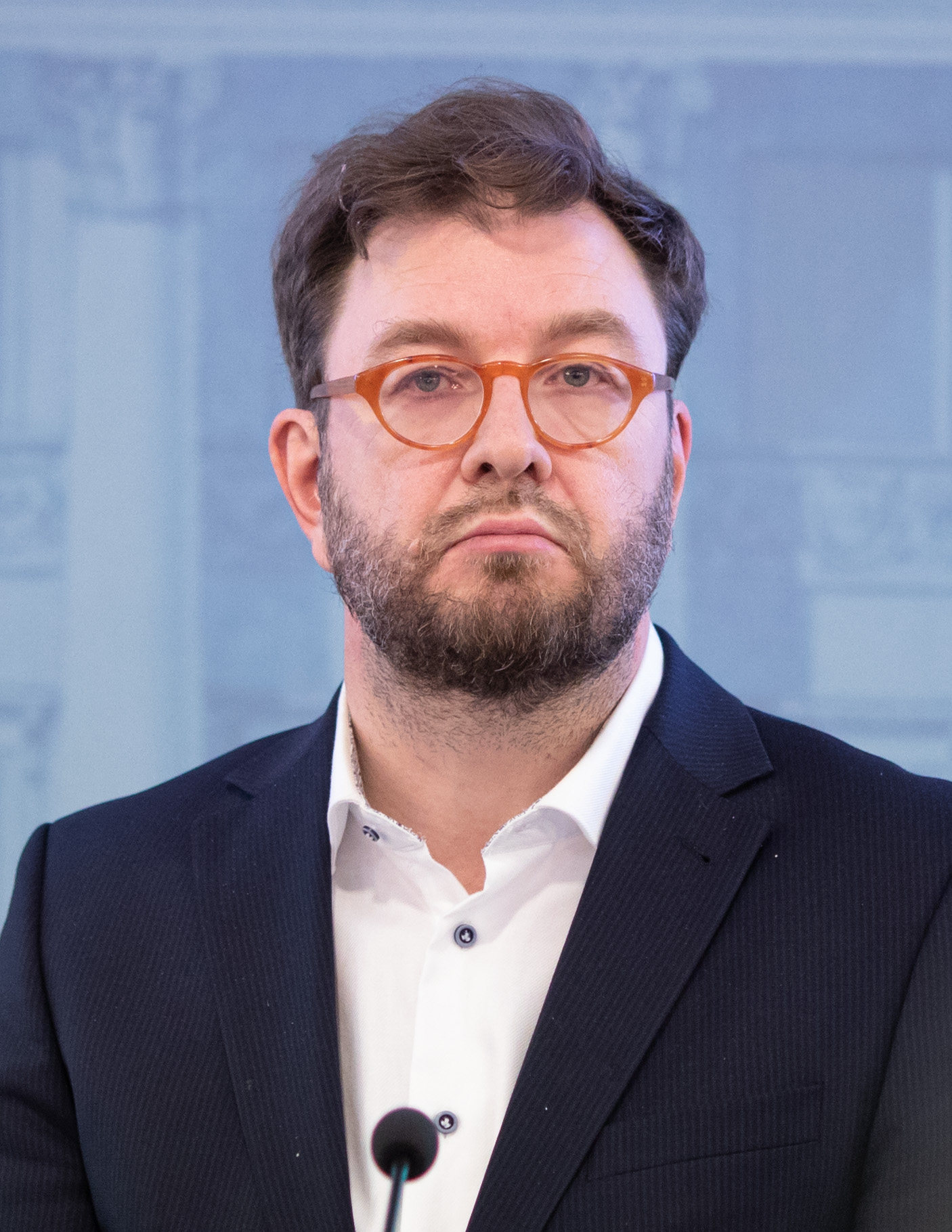

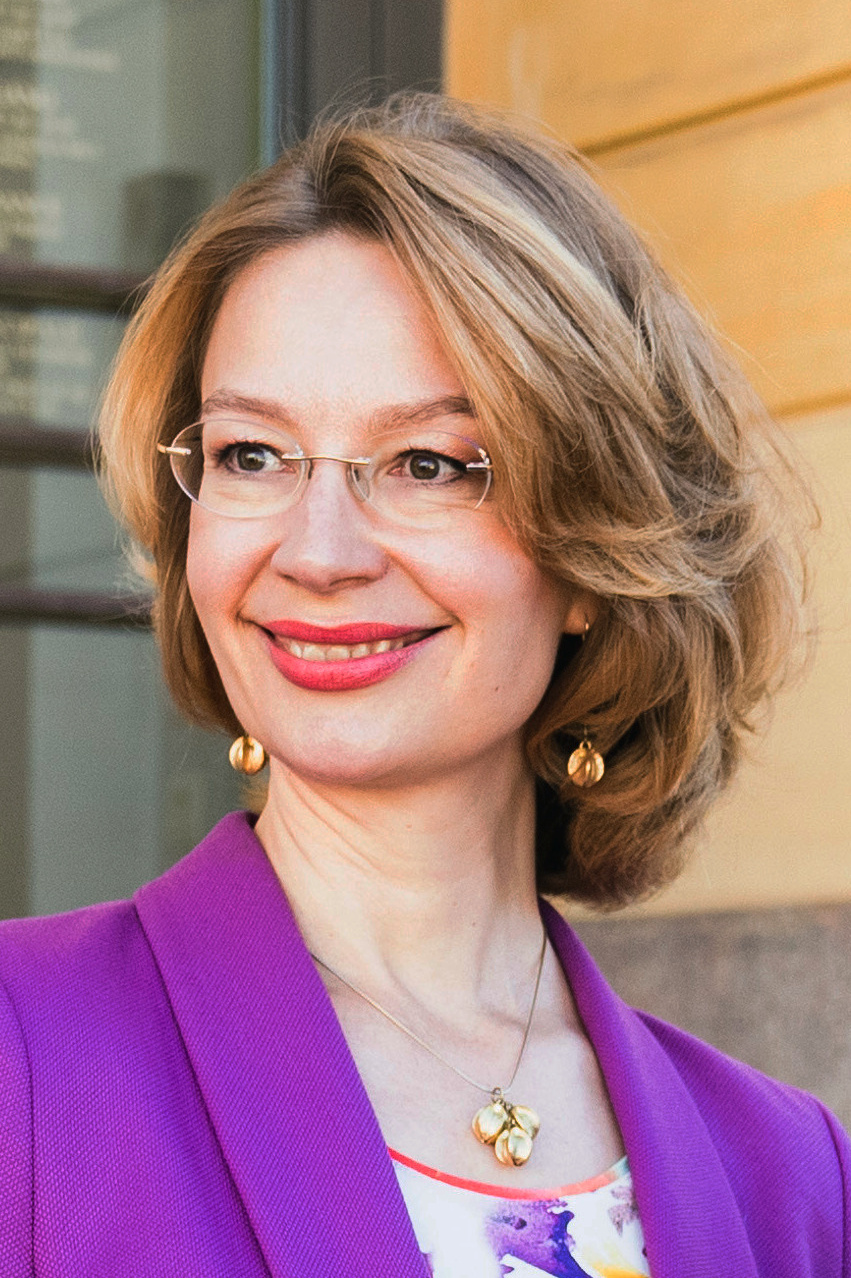
Candidate	Antti Rinne	Timo Harakka	Tytti Tuppurainen
Popular vote	281	159	55
Percentage	56.8%	32.1%	11.1%
Previous leader of the Social Democratic Party
Jutta Urpilainen
Elected leader of the Social Democratic Party
Antti Rinne

The 2017 Social Democratic Party of Finland leadership election was held on 4 February 2017. 495 voting attendees of the 45th Social Democratic party convention, held in Lahti, elected the incumbent chair Antti Rinne for a second term as the chair of Social Democratic Party. MP Timo Harakka finished second and MP Tytti Tuppurainen finished third.

== Results ==
Candidate	Votes	%
Antti Rinne	281	56.8
Timo Harakka	159	32.1
Tytti Tuppurainen	55	11.1
Source: Toivonen
