= Minister for Nordic Cooperation and Equality (Finland) =

The Minister for Nordic Cooperation and Equality (Finnish: Pohjoismaisen yhteistyön ja tasa-arvon ministeri, Swedish: Minister för nordiskt samarbete och jämställdhet) is one of the nineteen portfolios of Finland's incumbent Marin Cabinet. The position is one of three ministerial portfolios comprising the Ministry for Foreign Affairs.

== History ==
To date, there has been one Minister for Nordic Cooperation and Equality, the incumbent Thomas Blomqvist of the Swedish People's Party of Finland (SFP/RKP). In the five-party coalition government formation which forms the basis for the incumbent Marin government, as well as its predecessor, the Rinne government, the position of the Minister for Nordic Cooperation and Equality has been one of two portfolios held by SFP/RKP. The other position held by the party is that of the Minister of Justice. Before the government negotiations held after the 2019 Finnish parliamentary election, the task of Nordic Cooperation has been held as an additional portfolio, assumed by other ministers. For example, in the Sipilä government, the portfolio was held by the Minister of Transport and Communications.
