= Thomas Blomqvist =

Finnish politician

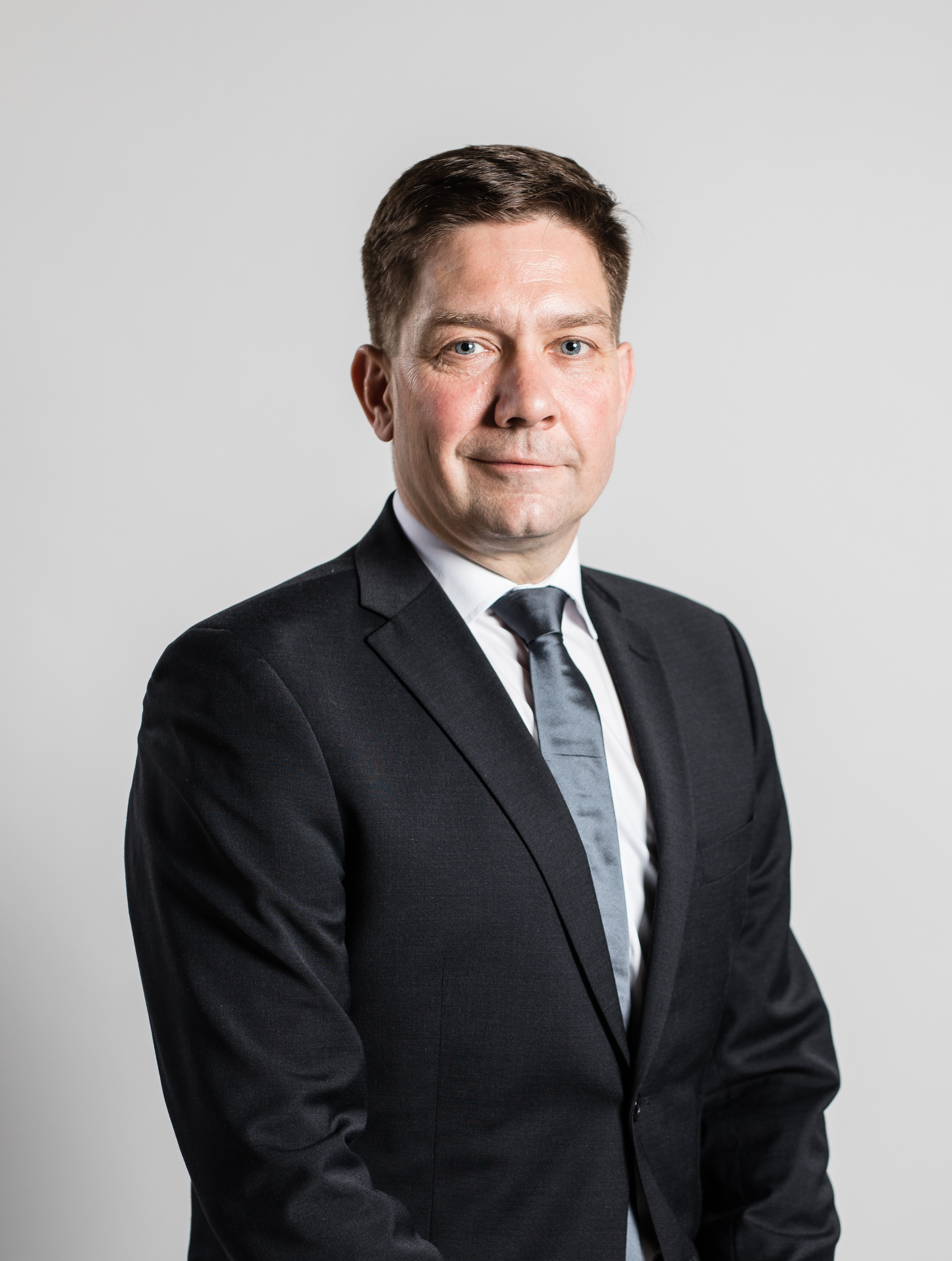
- Blomqvist in 2019

Minister for Nordic Cooperation and Equality
- In office 6 June 2019 – 20 June 2023
- Prime Minister: Antti Rinne; Sanna Marin
- Preceded by: Timo Soini
- Succeeded by: Anna-Maja Henriksson

Personal details
- Born: 15 January 1965 (age 61) Ekenäs, Uusimaa, Finland
- Party: Swedish People's Party
- Occupation: Farmer, entrepreneur
- Website: https://www.thomasblomqvist.fi

Thomas Blomqvist (born 15 January 1965) is a Finnish politician, born in Ekenäs in current Raseborg. Before entering to the national politics he worked as a farmer and an entrepreneur.

Blomqvist was elected to the municipal council of Ekenäs in 1993. In 2009 he was elected to the municipal council of Raseborg (to which Ekenäs had joined) and has held his position ever since.

He was elected to the Finnish Parliament for the Swedish People's Party in 2007, from the constituency of Uusimaa. In 2019 he was re-elected to the parliament for the term 2019–2023. He was appointed Minister for Nordic Cooperation Antti Rinne's cabinet in 2019. After the collapse of the cabinet in December 2019, Blomqvist continued in the same position in the following Marin Cabinet. He was not re-elected in 2023.

Blomqvist is married and the couple has three children.

== Honors ==
- Order of the White Rose of Finland (Finland, 2022)
- Order of the Falcon (Iceland, 2022)
