= Posti Group =

Finnish national postal company

Posti Group Corporation
- Native name: Finnish: Posti Group Oyj; Swedish: Posti Group Abp
- Type: Julkinen osakeyhtiö
- Traded as: Nasdaq Helsinki: POSTI
- Industry: Postal service, logistics, financial process automation
- Founded: 6 September 1638; 388 years ago
- Headquarters: Helsinki, Finland
- Revenue: €1.521 billion (2024)
- Owner: Government of Finland
- Number of employees: 20,316 (2017 on average)
- Website: posti.com

Posti Group Oyj (previously Suomen Posti during 1994–2007 and Itella during 2007–2015), trading internationally as Posti Group Corporation, is the main Finnish postal service delivering mail and parcels in Finland. With roughly two thirds of the company's shares, the State of Finland is the largest shareholder of Posti. Posti has a universal service obligation that entails weekday deliveries of letters in all of Finland's municipalities. Posti's head office is located in Pohjois-Pasila in Helsinki. Posti's history spans nearly 400 years.

Posti's net sales in 2024 were EUR 1,521 million. Posti has 20,300 employees. Of the net sales, approximately 96% comes from businesses and organizations. The company's key customer sectors are commerce, services and media.

As of 2015, the group is headed by Heikki Malinen, and Arto Markku Pohjola is Chairman of the Board of Directors. The company has operations in ten countries: Finland, Sweden, Norway, Estonia, Latvia, Lithuania, Poland, Germany, Switzerland and United States. Åland Post is the independent postal operator for the Åland Islands.

Posti Group's shares were listed on the Nasdaq Helsinki stock exchange on 10 October, 2025 after an initial public offering. As of 15 October, 2025, the Finnish state retains an ownership stake of 66.65%.

== Operations ==
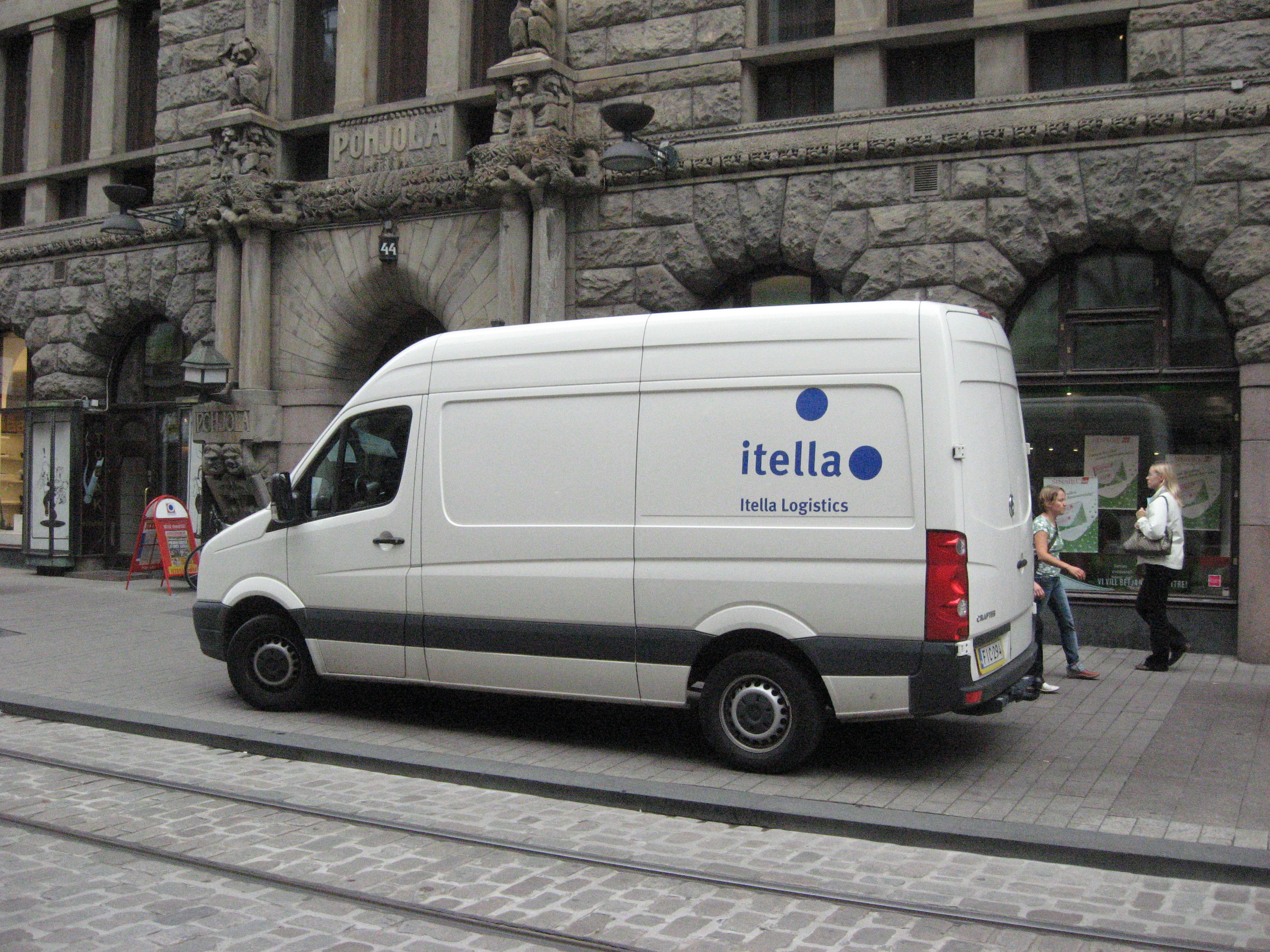
An Itella Logistics van

Postal Services handles the delivery of letters, direct mail, and newspapers and magazines in Finland through its subsidiary Posti Oy. Delivery personnel also offer check-in and assistance services for the elderly, and in 2016 ran a pilot program offering lawn mowing. Home services help public and private home care providers be more efficient and flexible in producing their services

Parcel and Logistics Services offers parcel and e-commerce services, transport services, international road, air, sea and rail freight services, warehousing or supplementary services and customs clearance services.

== Historical background ==
- On 6 September 1638, Governor-General Per Brahe the Younger established postal services in Finland, part of the Kingdom of Sweden at the time.
  - The Posti headquarters in Helsinki (Postintaival) have their main auditorium named after Brahe and his portrait by David Beck.
- In 1811, a central postal administration was established within the postal services of autonomous Finland.
- In 1845, postal service for parcels began.
- In 1856, stamps were introduced. (Finland began issuing its own national stamps in autumn 1917, before independence was declared on 6 December 1917.)
- In 1858, home delivery of letters and newspapers began.
- Posti was one of the first institutions to hire women as employees, doing so since the 1860s.
- In 1927, the Telegraph was merged with the Finnish Post (Posti).

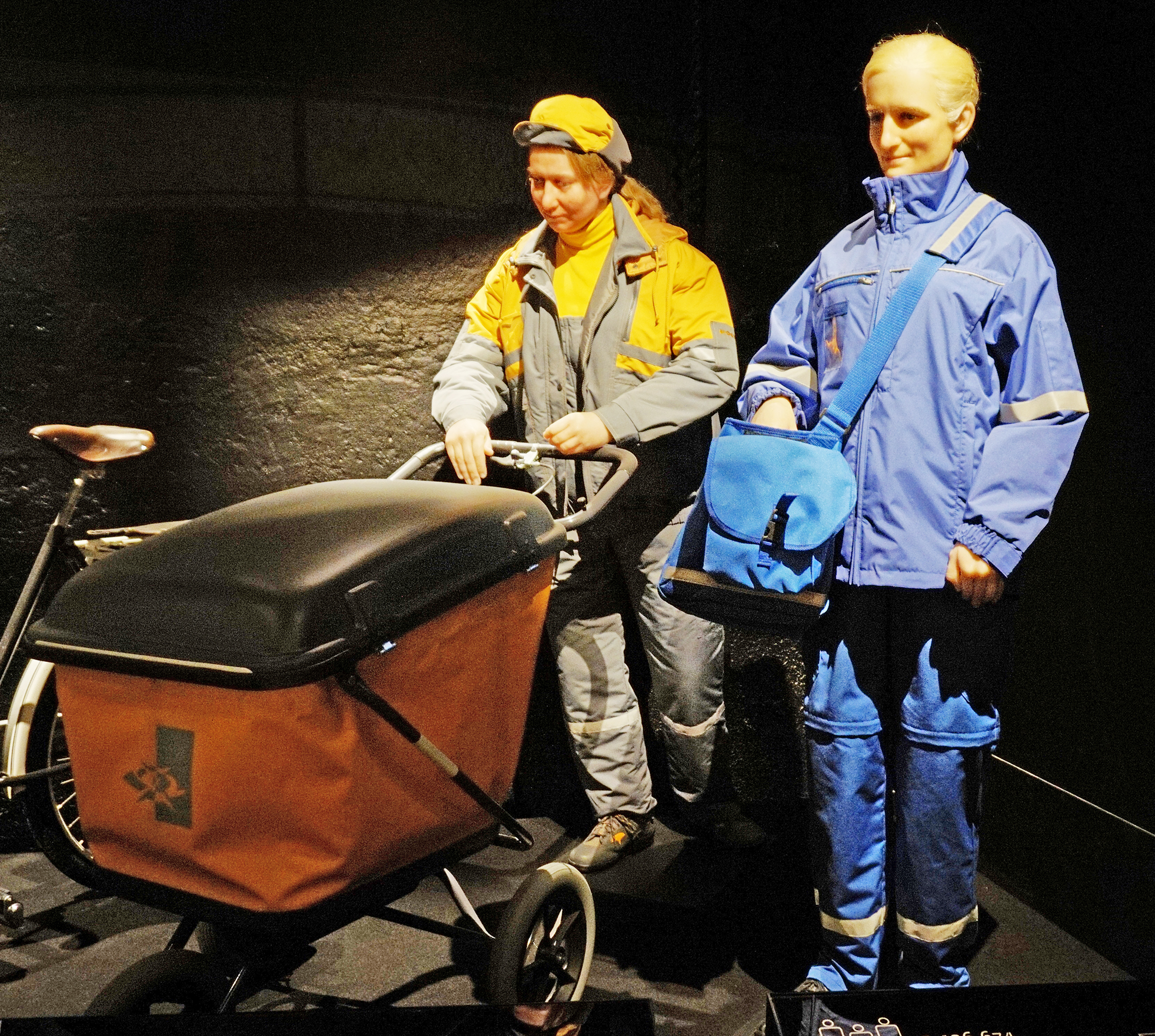
Messenger uniforms

- In 1981, Post and Telegraph was renamed Post and Telecommunications.
- In 1990, Posti-Tele became a state-owned enterprise no longer dependent on the state budget.
- In 1994, Post and Telecommunications became Suomen PT Oy, with the subsidiaries Finland Post Corporation, providing postal services, and Telecom Finland Oy (later Sonera Oy), engaged in telecommunications.
- In 1998, Suomen PT Group was demerged. Finland Post Corporation and Sonera Oy became state-owned enterprises.
- In 2001, Finland Post became a public company (as Finland Post Corporation).
- On 1 June 2007, the company's name was changed to Itella Corporation. The group's more diversified and internationalised business operations were the reason for the change of name.
- In 2008, Itella acquired in Russia the logistics company NLC (National Logistic Company) and Connexions company, specialising in direct marketing services. In Poland Itella acquired BusinessPoint S.A., specialising in printing and document management.
- In 2011, Finnish postal services have been transferred to a new company, Itella Posti Oy.
- In 2011, Itella Information acquired OpusCapita, Itella Information acquired OpusCapita expanding services to cash flow automation.
- Itella Bank started as a deposit bank in the beginning of 2012.
- In 2013, Itella divested the entire share capital of Itella Bank Ltd to Finnish Savings Bank Group.
- In 2013, Itella Information was renamed OpusCapita. It operates as a subgroup of Itella Group.

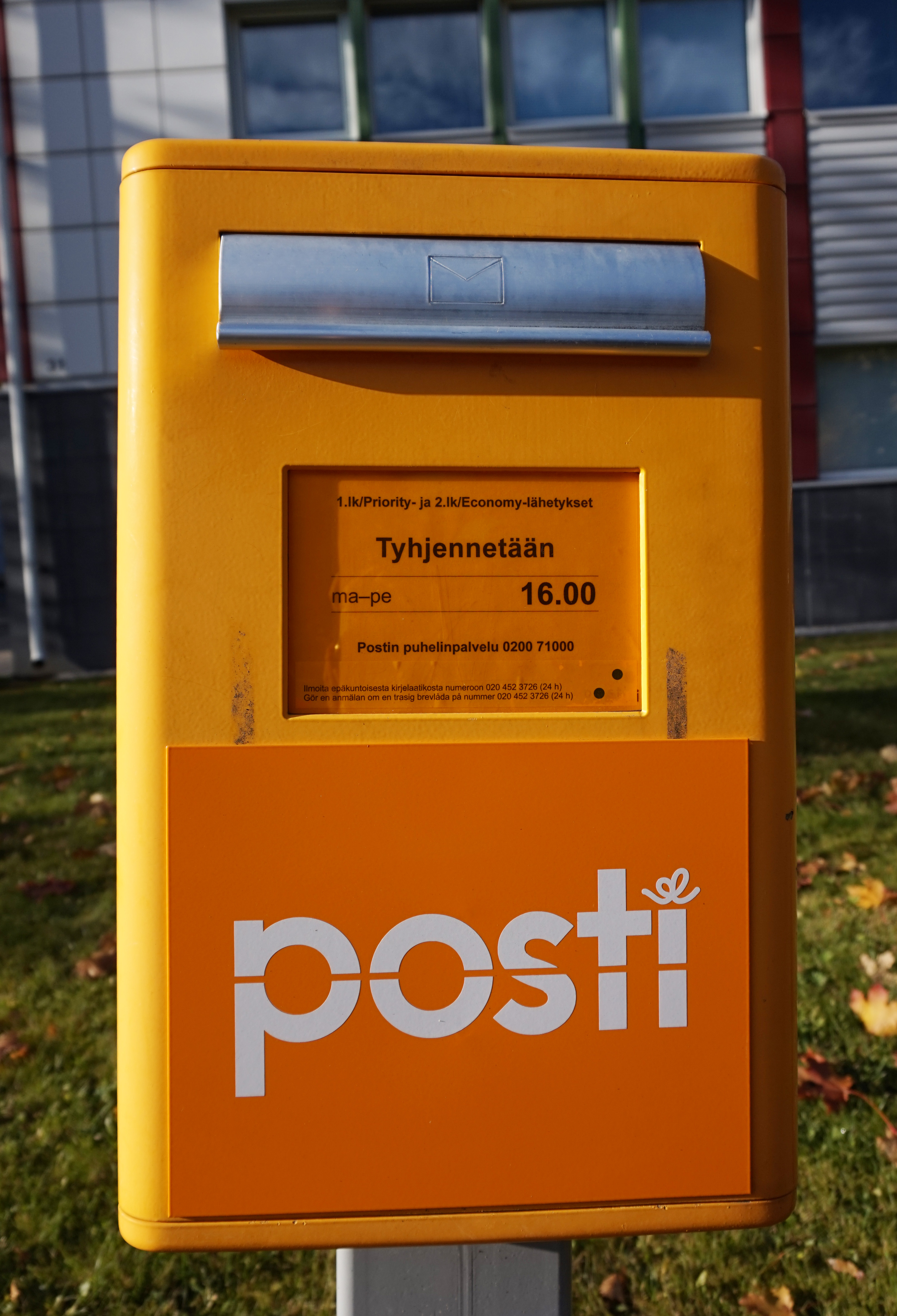
Posti mailbox in Jyväskylä

- On 1 January 2015, Itella Oyj changed its name to Posti Group Oyj. Subsidiaries Itella Posti Oy and Itella Logistics Oy were merged and renamed to Posti Oy.
- In 2015, Posti sold its Scandinavian road freight business operations to the Danish Nordic Transport Group (NTG).
- Posti launched the first municipal cooperation within Posti's new home services with the South Karelia Social and Health Care District Eksote.
- Posti acquired Kuljetus Kovalainen and Veine, a company specializing in temperature-regulated logistics.
- Posti Group divested OpusCapita to Providence Equity in 2019.

== Postal Services ==
Former Posti logo

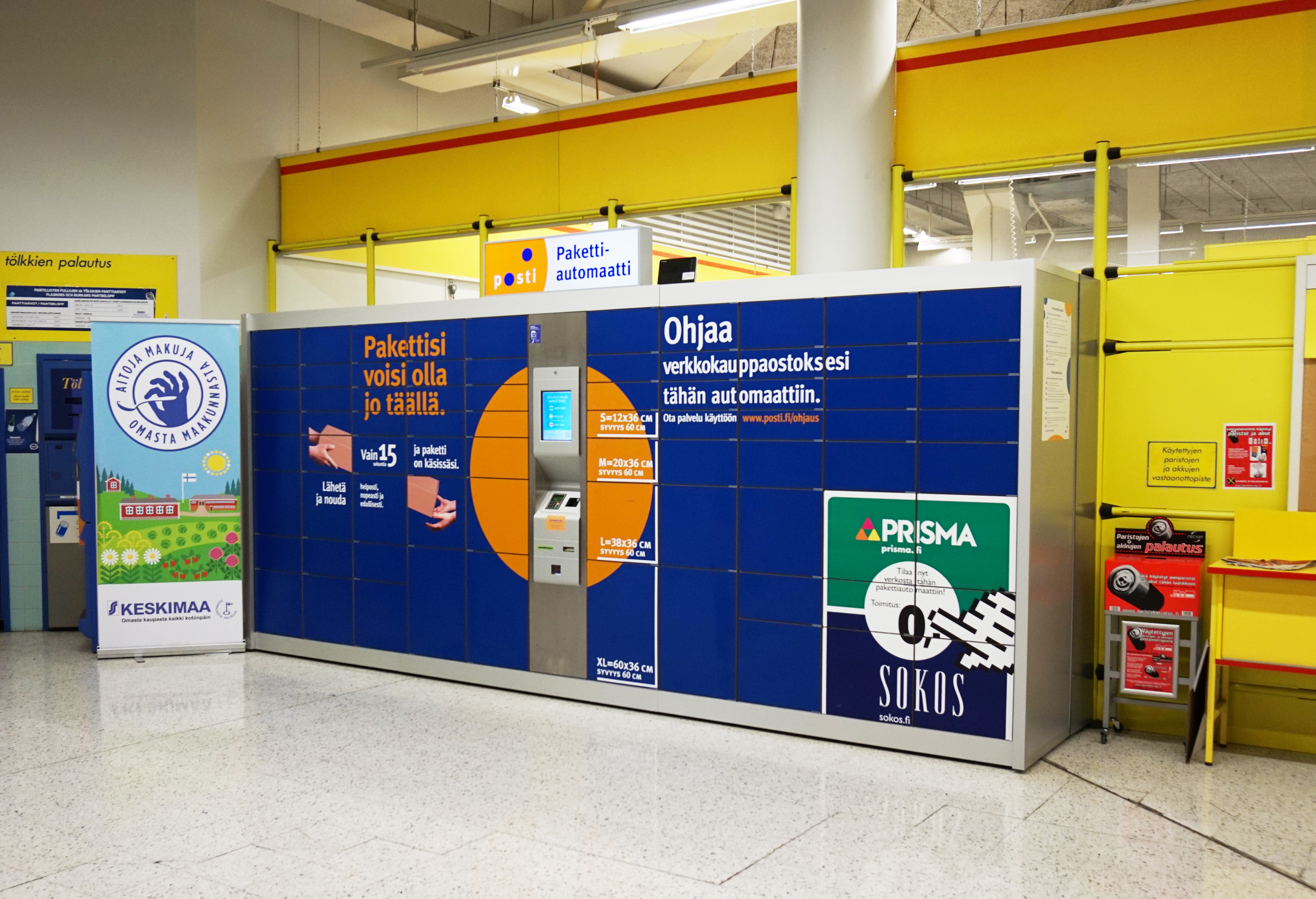
Posti's parcel machine

Domestic postal services were centralized in Posti Oy. Posti has more than 1,400 service points: post offices, of which most are in conjunction with companies run by local entrepreneurs, Parcel Points, and pick-up outlets. There are SmartPOST automatic parcel terminals also in Estonia.

As of February 2011, Finland will be the first country in the world to receive all letters, publications, packages and direct advertisements through carbon-neutral delivery by Posti. This does not involve any extra fees to the customers.

Posti Group is solely responsible for providing postal services. In its current form, the Post Act entered into force in 2011. By virtue of this act, postal services must be provided on a permanent basis and for reasonable prices to all users, throughout the country. In each municipality there must be at least one outlet providing postal services.

The responsibility for the general steering and development of postal services belongs to the Ministry of Transport and Communications. Also the Finnish Communications Regulatory Authority, acting under this ministry, participates in the development of postal services. Among its tasks are monitoring to ensure that the Act on Postal Services and its regulations and provisions are complied with, as well as handling customer feedback.

The basic mail delivery is open to competition and some companies are starting to deliver business letters in populated areas.

== International operations ==
In 2016, Posti established a network of pickup points in the Baltic countries. In 2020, Posti bought the Swedish logistics company Aditro Logistics.

- Estonia: SmartPosti Eesti
- Finland: Posti
- Latvia: SmartPosti Latvija
- Lithuania: SmartPosti Lietuva
- Sweden: Posti

== Wages ==
According to Taloussanomat, Posti Group CEO Heikki Malinen compensation increased 65% in four years to €990,000 in 2019. Heikki Malinen resigned on 2 October 2019.

A strike stopped letters and packets delivery in Finland and from abroad on 11–27 November 2019. The Posti management wanted to reduce salaries 30–50%. The Rinne government denied wage dumping. The minister in charge, Sirpa Paatero, resigned on 29 November 2019.

== Revenue ==
According to Finnish Television New MOT Posti made during 2008–2015 over €170 million losses in logistic business when traditional postal services made €500 million profit. Since 2016 Posti does not specify the logistics financial values of company.
