= Tytti Tuppurainen =

Finnish politician (born 1976)

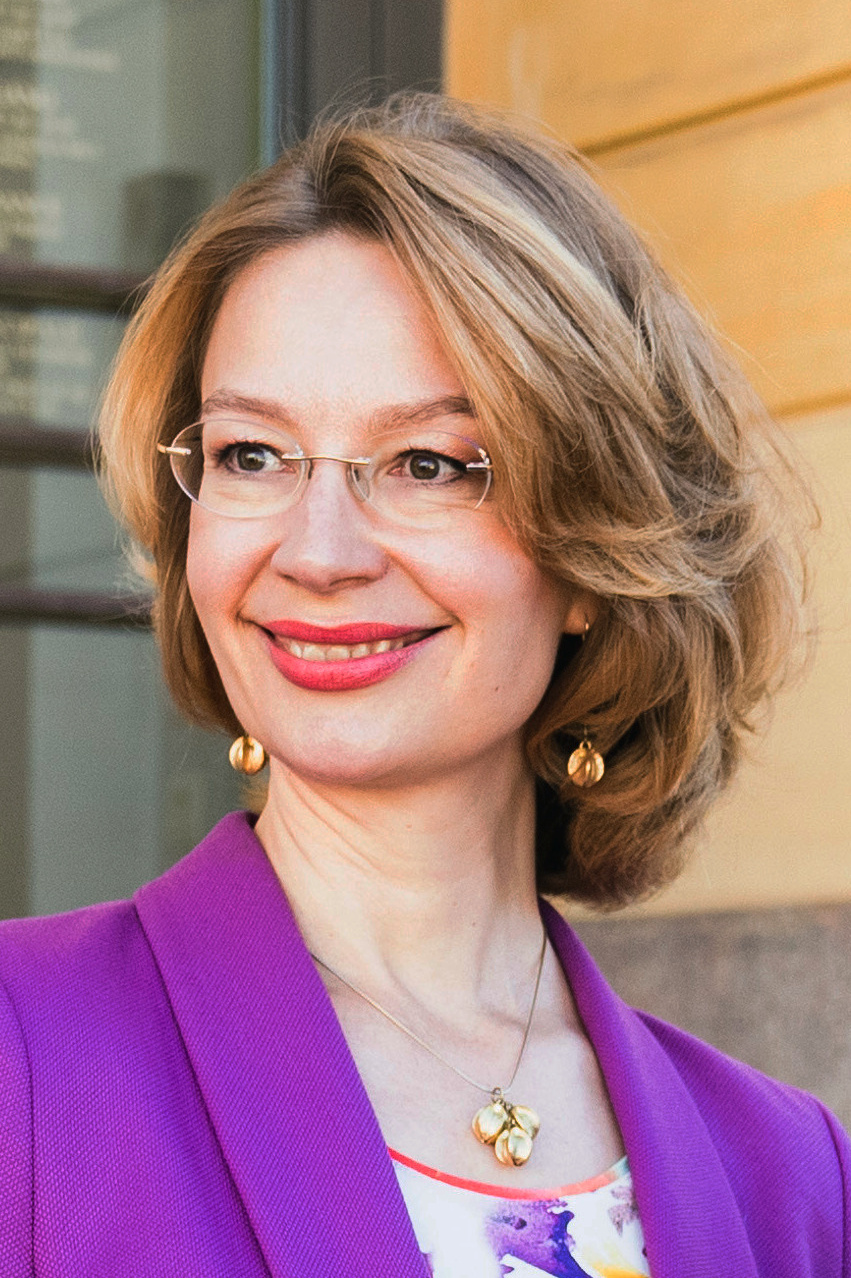
- Tuppurainen in 2019

Minister of European Affairs and Ownership Steering
- In office 10 December 2019 – 20 June 2023
- Prime Minister: Sanna Marin
- Preceded by: Herself (European Affairs); Sirpa Paatero (Ownership Steering)
- Succeeded by: Anders Adlercreutz

Minister for European Affairs
- In office 6 June 2019 – 10 December 2019
- Prime Minister: Antti Rinne
- Preceded by: Sampo Terho
- Succeeded by: Herself

Personal details
- Born: 18 February 1976 (age 50) Oulu, North Ostrobothnia, Finland
- Party: Social Democratic Party

Tytti Tuppurainen (born 18 February 1976) is a Finnish politician.

Born in Oulu, Tuppurainen was elected to the Finnish Parliament for the Social Democratic Party in 2011, from the constituency of Oulu. In 2019 she was re-elected to the parliament for the term 2019–2023.

Tuppurainen was appointed Minister for European Affairs in the cabinet of Prime Minister Antti Rinne in 2019. When Finland held the rotating presidency of the Council of the European Union, she led talks with member states over its budget for the years 2021–2027.

After the collapse of the Rinne Cabinet in December 2019, Tuppurainen continued in the subsequent Marin Cabinet, in which she had "Ownership Steering" added to her ministerial portfolio. This refers to the policy for government-owned companies. During her tenure she oversaw the €6 billion loss of Uniper from Fortum, which is majority state-owned.

== Honours ==
- Order of the White Rose of Finland (Finland, 2022)
