= 2019 Finnish postal strike =

Labor disputes in Finland

- Date: 2019
- Location: Finland
- Type: Protest, Strike
- Cause: Attempt to transfer 700 postal workers to different contracts
- Outcome: Downfall of the Rinne Cabinet; Sanna Marin becomes Prime Minister of Finland

The 2019 Finnish postal strike was a series of strikes and protests that resulted in the resignation of Prime Minister Antti Rinne and his cabinet. In November 2019, Rinne and local government minister Sirpa Paatero were accused of giving misinformation, specifically about the transfer of work-contracts of 700 Posti (Finland's state owned postal service) package handlers, which would result in lower pay. The strike led to a one-day sympathy strike by Finland's transport sector, which gradually escalated into a general strike by multiple trade unions. It ultimately led to the resignation of Prime Minister Rinne, when the Centre Party withdrew its support from his cabinet.

== Background ==
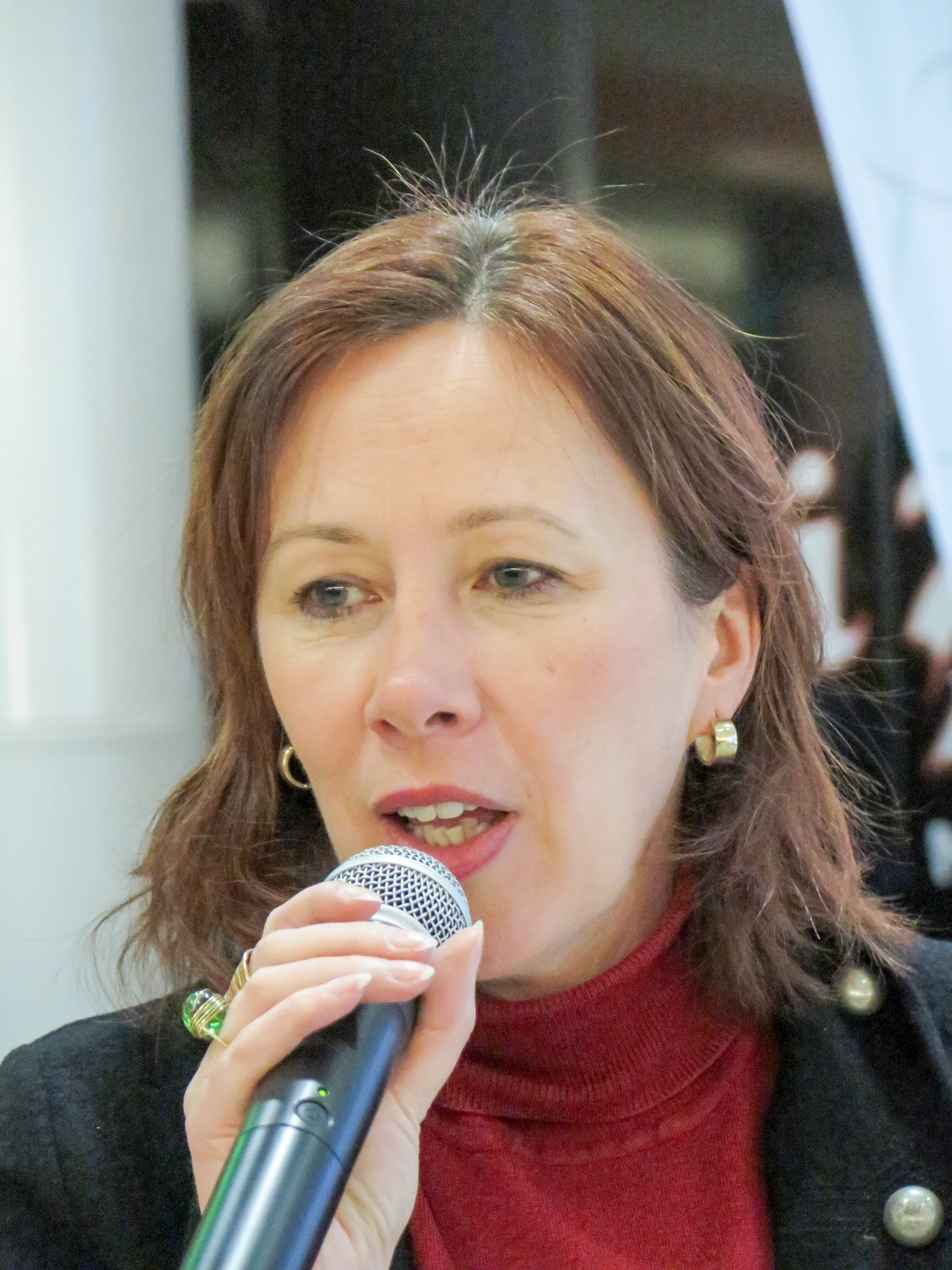
Sirpa Paatero who did not prevent Posti from cutting the pay of around 700 workers

Labor unions in Finland have been traditionally strong, but they have been angered by the competitiveness pact, which increased working hours three days a year without pay rise between 2016 and 2019. The deal was negotiated in 2019, to help Finland recover from recession. The center-left government, elected in 2019, was considered more favorable to employee concerns.

== The strike ==
In response, the postal and logistics union went into strike on November 11. 14 days later, solidarity protests from unions in other industries shut the nation down. Despite disruption in daily lives, 60 percent of Finns supported the move. Two days later, the postal workers reached an agreement with the government. Both parties settled that the 700 workers will return to the previous collective employee-employer agreement, and workers will return to their work.

== Aftermath ==
In wake of the crisis, the Center Party said that it had lost confidence in Rinne, and Rinne handed over his resignation to president Sauli Niinistö. Sanna Marin, a Social Democratic Party member, was appointed prime minister following his resignation.
