= Ville Tavio =

Finnish politician

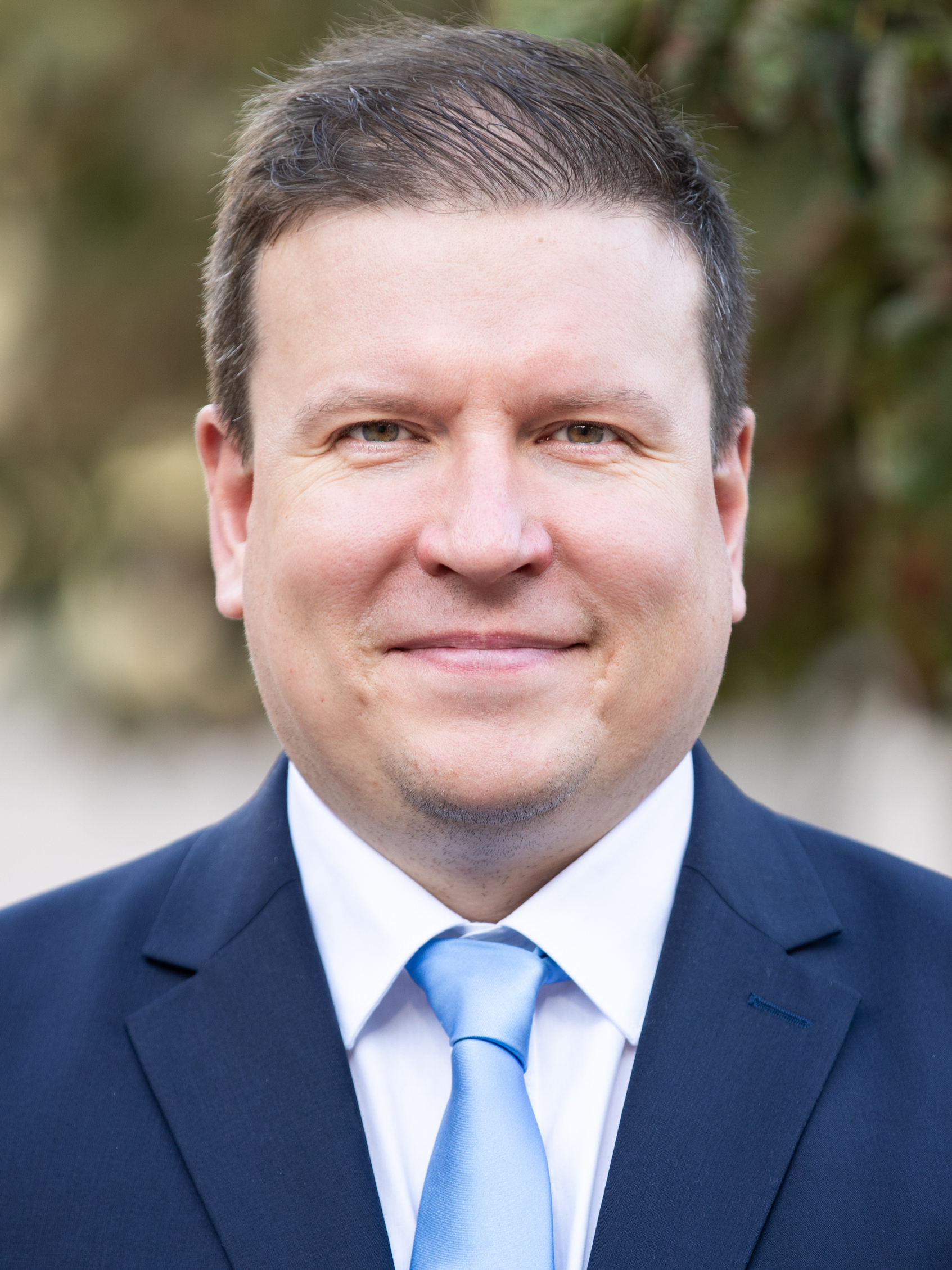
- Tavio in 2023

Minister for Development Cooperation and Foreign Trade
- Incumbent
- Assumed office 20 June 2023
- Prime Minister: Petteri Orpo
- Preceded by: Ville Skinnari

Chairperson of the Finns Party Parliamentary Group
- Incumbent
- Assumed office 23 April 2019
- Preceded by: Leena Meri

Member of the Finnish Parliament for Finland Proper
- Incumbent
- Assumed office 22 April 2015

Personal details
- Born: Ville Tapani Tavio; 25 June 1984 (age 41) Lappeenranta, South Karelia, Finland
- Party: Finns Party
- Website: Official website

Ville Tapani Tavio (born June 25, 1984) is a Finnish politician and member of the Parliament of Finland (MP). He became the chairperson of the Finns Party Parliamentary Group in April 2019. He has been Minister for Development Cooperation and Foreign Trade since June 2023.

== Education ==
After upper secondary school graduation, Tavio enrolled in the University of Turku and received LL.M. degree in 2012. He has been an exchange student at the Prince of Songkla University in Thailand in 2010.

== Political career ==
Tavio joined the Finns Party in 2012. He was first elected to the Turku City Council in October 2012 and to the Parliament of Finland in April 2015.

In June 2023, he was appointed Minister for Development Cooperation and Foreign Trade in the Orpo Cabinet.

== Controversies ==
After his appointment in June 2023, Tavio's past remarks came under scrutiny, as he had continuously claimed in the Parliament that ethnic Finns are being demographically replaced with non-white peoples, thus referring to the Great Replacement. Finnish Security Intelligence Service considers that the Great Replacement is one of the noteworthy ideological motivations of far-right terrorism.

Tavio has also written that, if living in the Wild West, "climate-crazed" president of the European Commission, Ursula von der Leyen would have been "kicked out of the country and dipped in oil and feathers". These writings circulated widely in German media after Tavio's appointment.
