= Jari Leppä =

Finnish politician

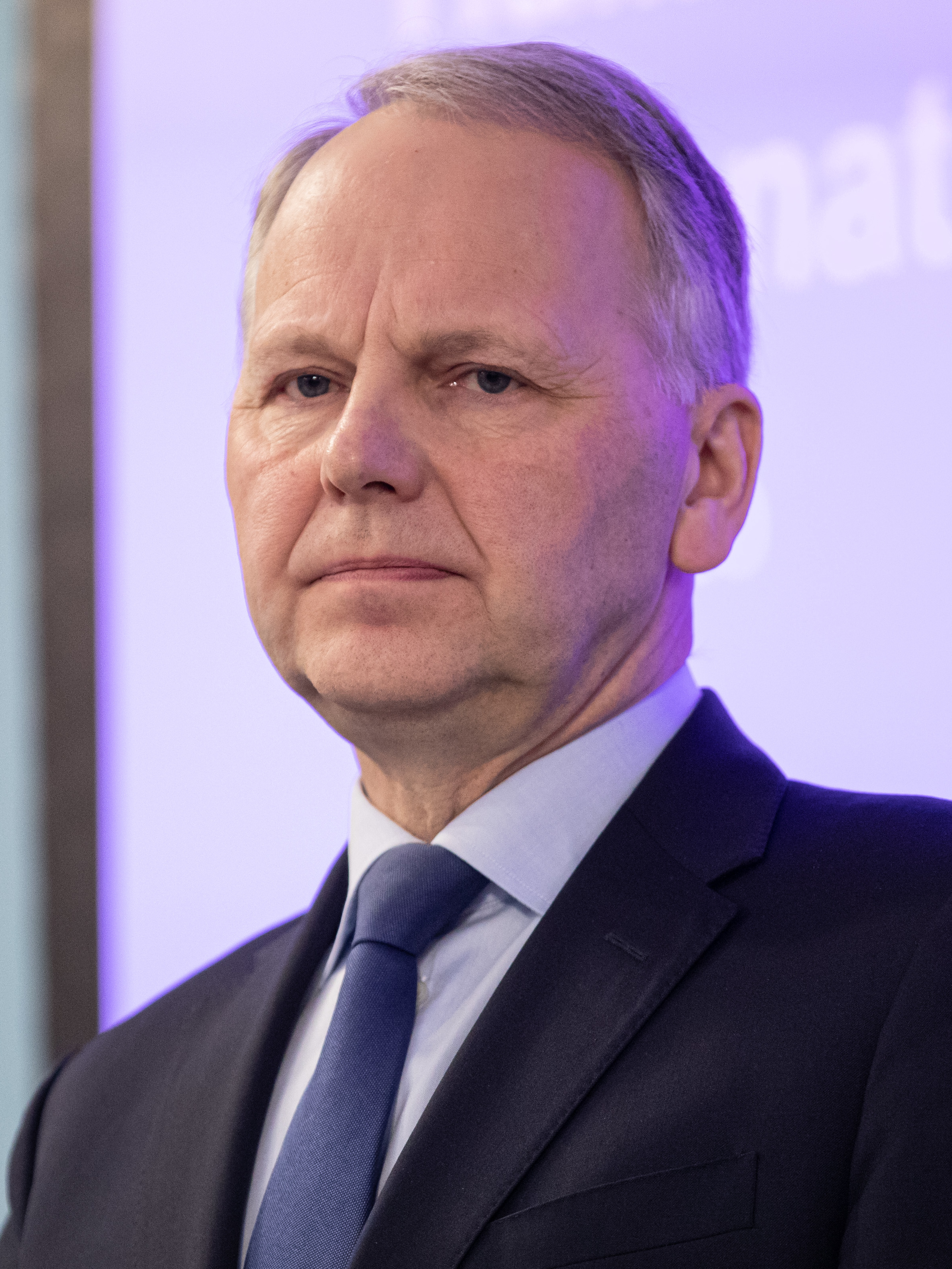
- Leppä in 2020

Minister of Agriculture
- In office 5 May 2017 – 29 April 2022
- Prime Minister: Juha Sipilä; Antti Rinne; Sanna Marin
- Preceded by: Kimmo Tiilikainen
- Succeeded by: Antti Kurvinen

Member of the Finnish Parliament
- Incumbent
- Assumed office 24 March 1999
- Constituency: Southeast Finland

Personal details
- Born: Jari Juhani Leppä; 24 June 1959 (age 66) Pertunmaa, Finland
- Party: Centre
- Spouse: Katriina Leppä
- Website: www.jarileppa.fi

Jari Juhani Leppä (born 24 June 1959 in Pertunmaa, Finland) is a Finnish politician, representing the Centre Party. He has served as a Member of Parliament since 1999 and Minister of Agriculture from 2017 until his resignation on 29 April 2022.
