= 2019 Finnish parliamentary election =

- 14 April 2019

All 200 seats in Parliament 101 seats needed for a majority
- Registered: 4,510,040
- Turnout: 72.8% (▲2.7 pp)
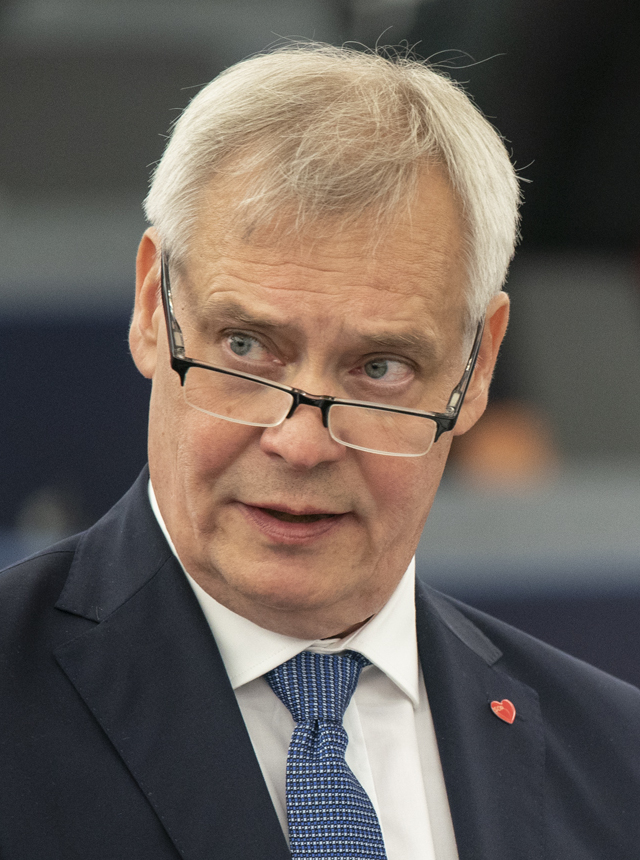

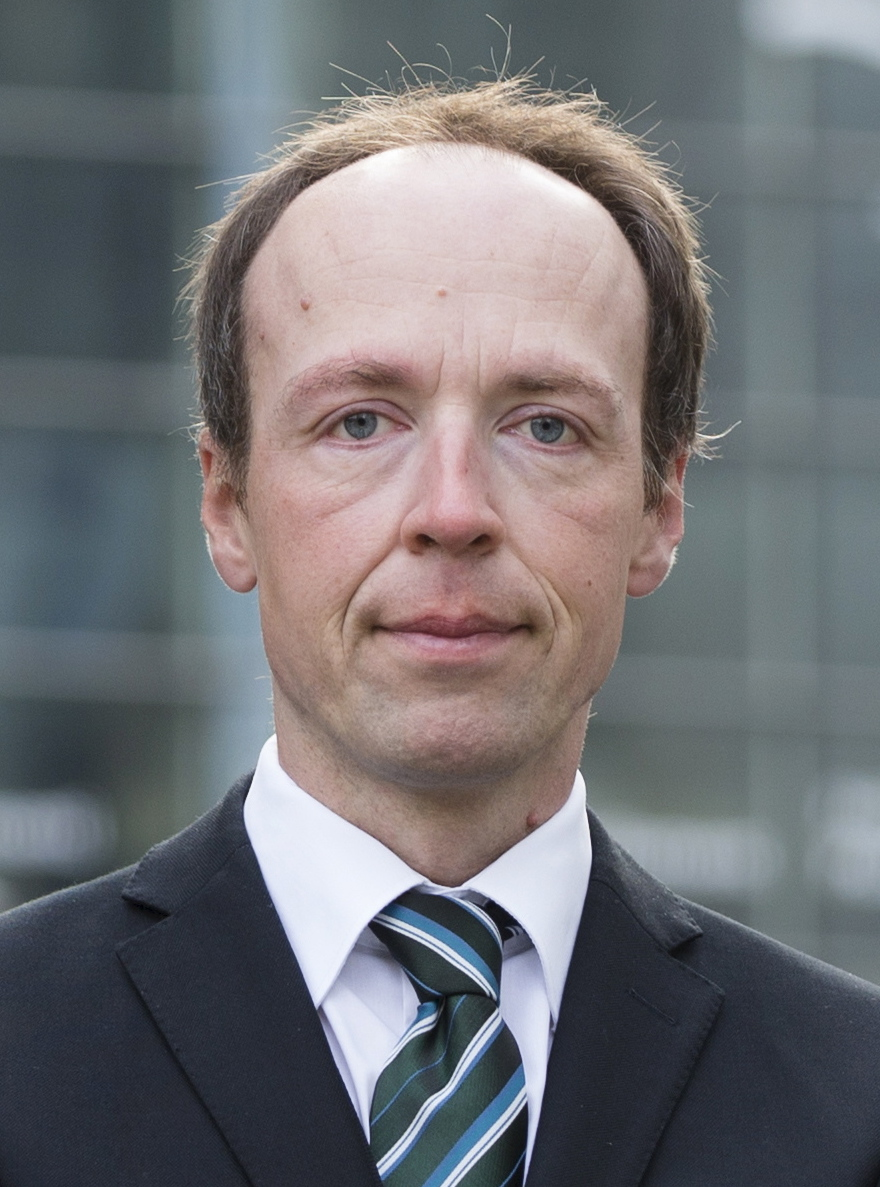

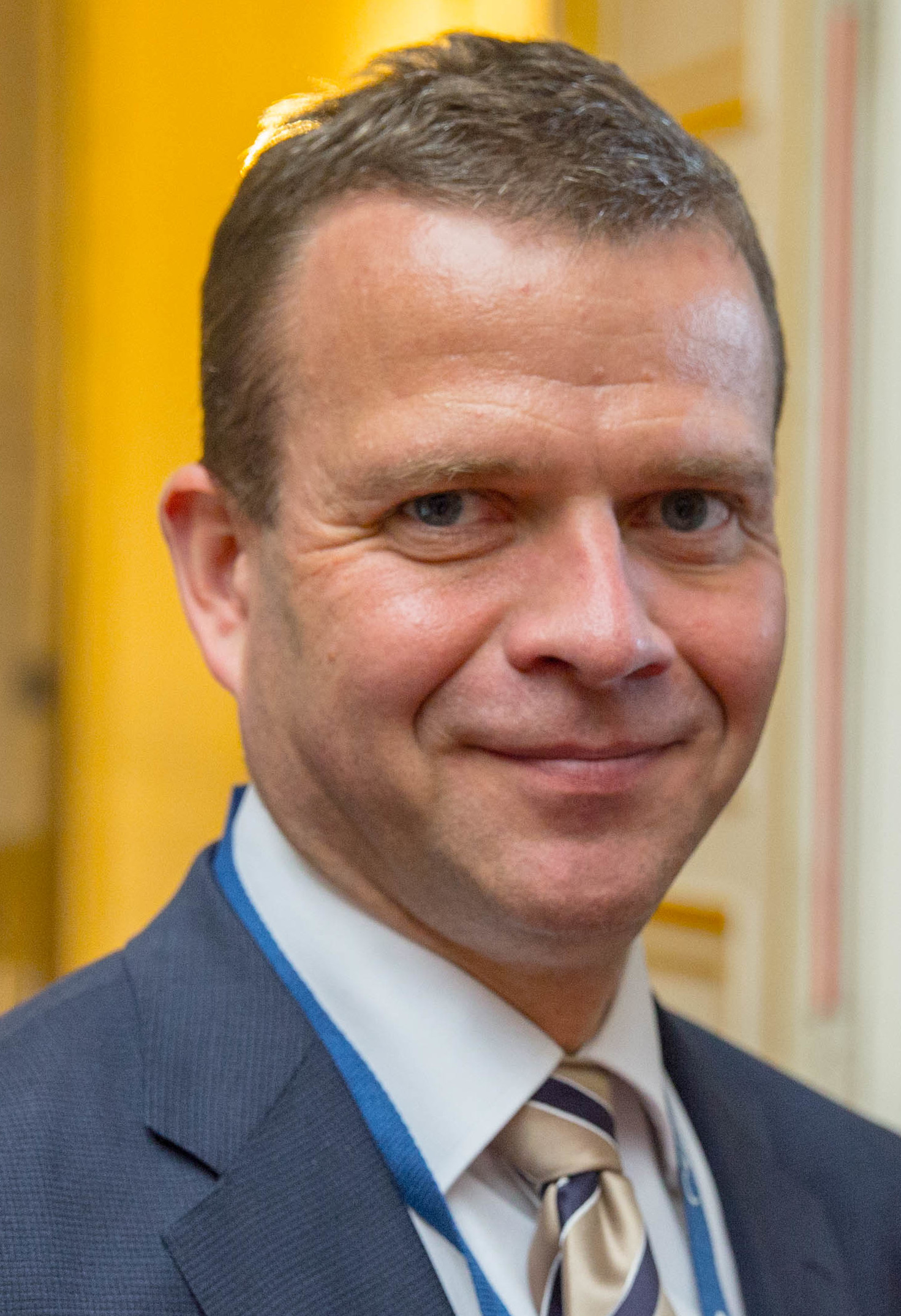

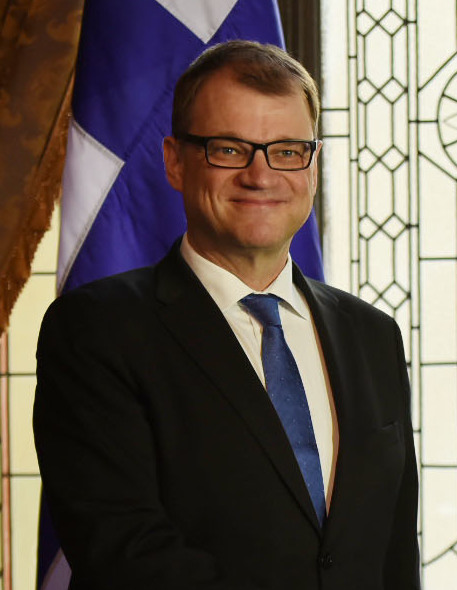

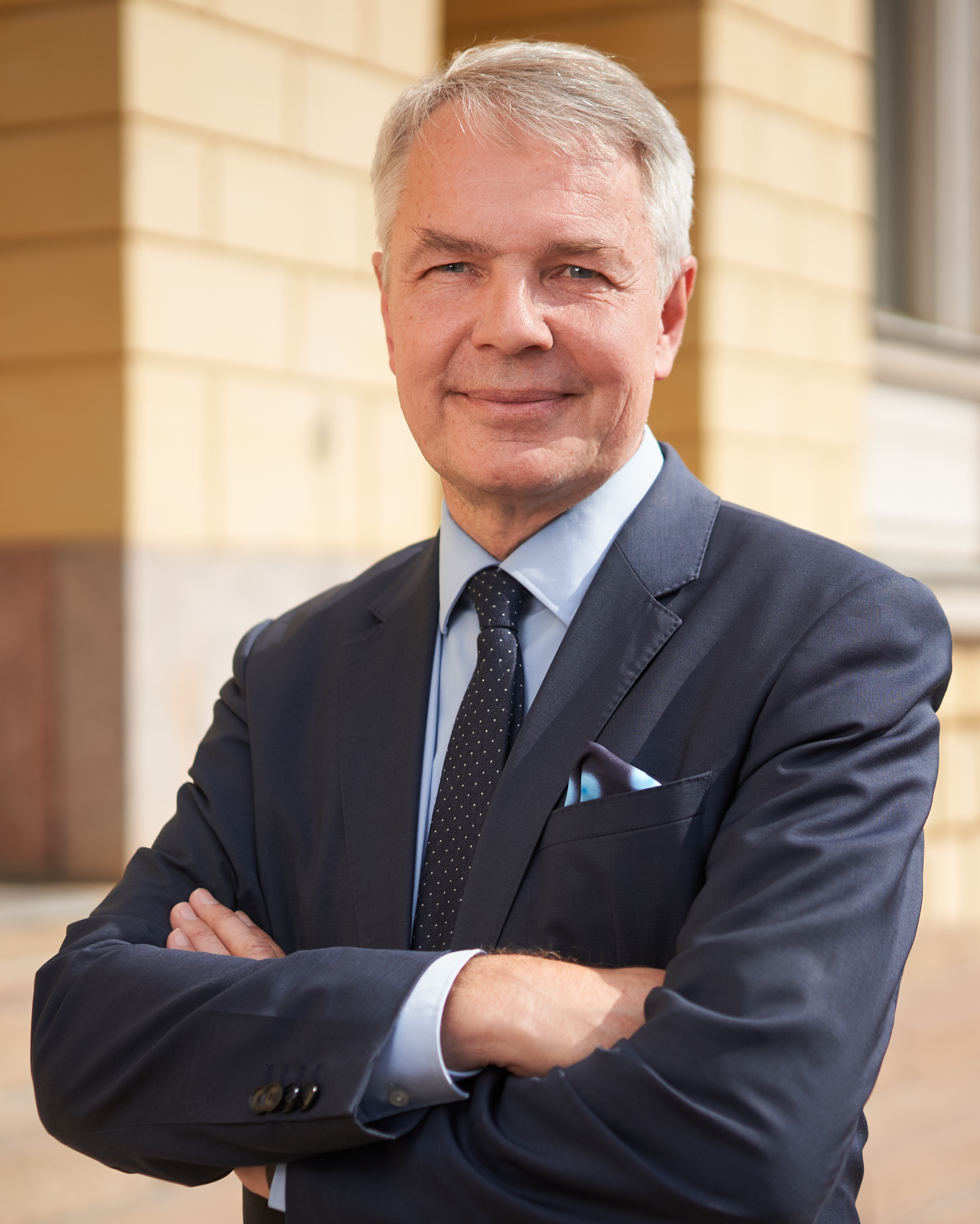

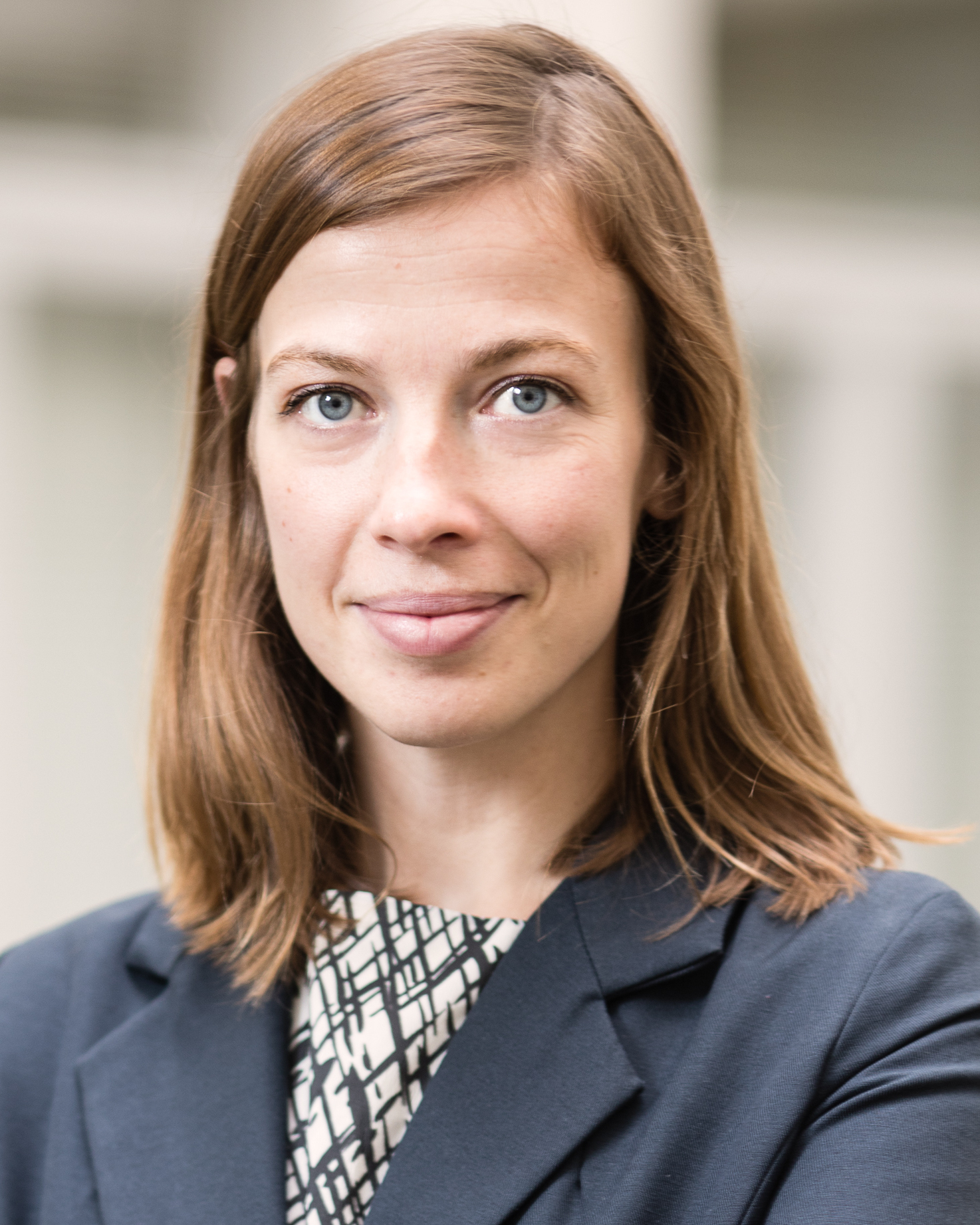

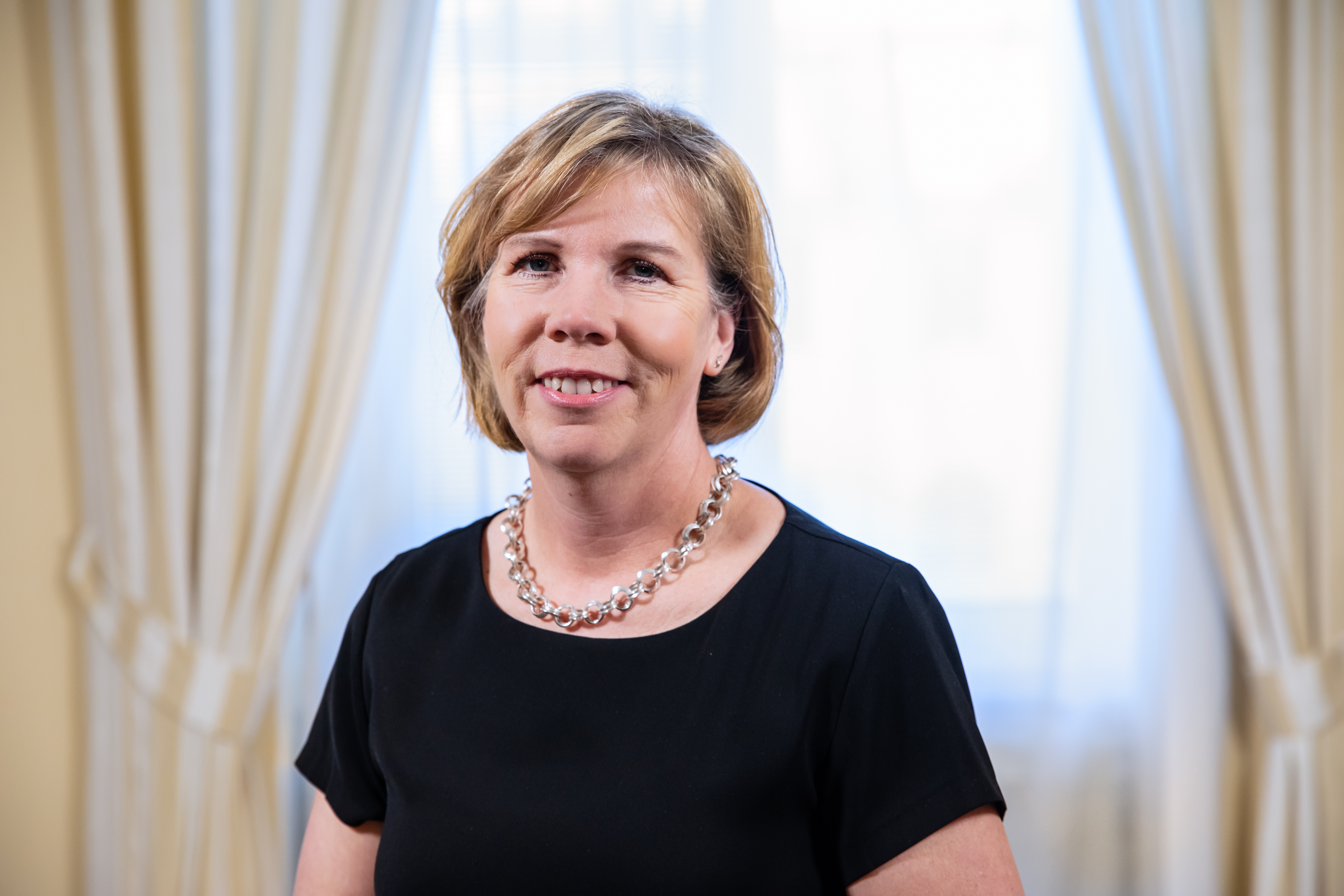

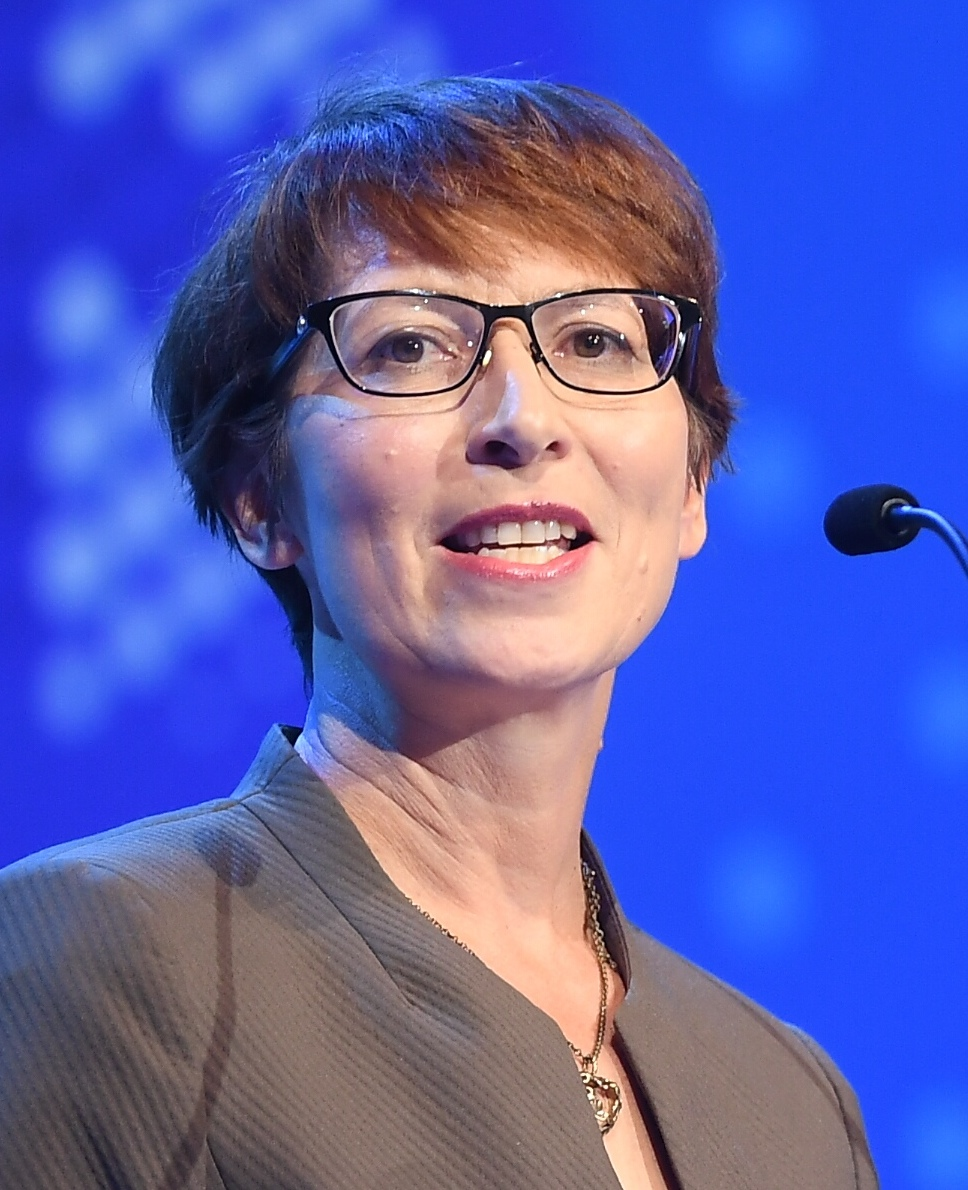

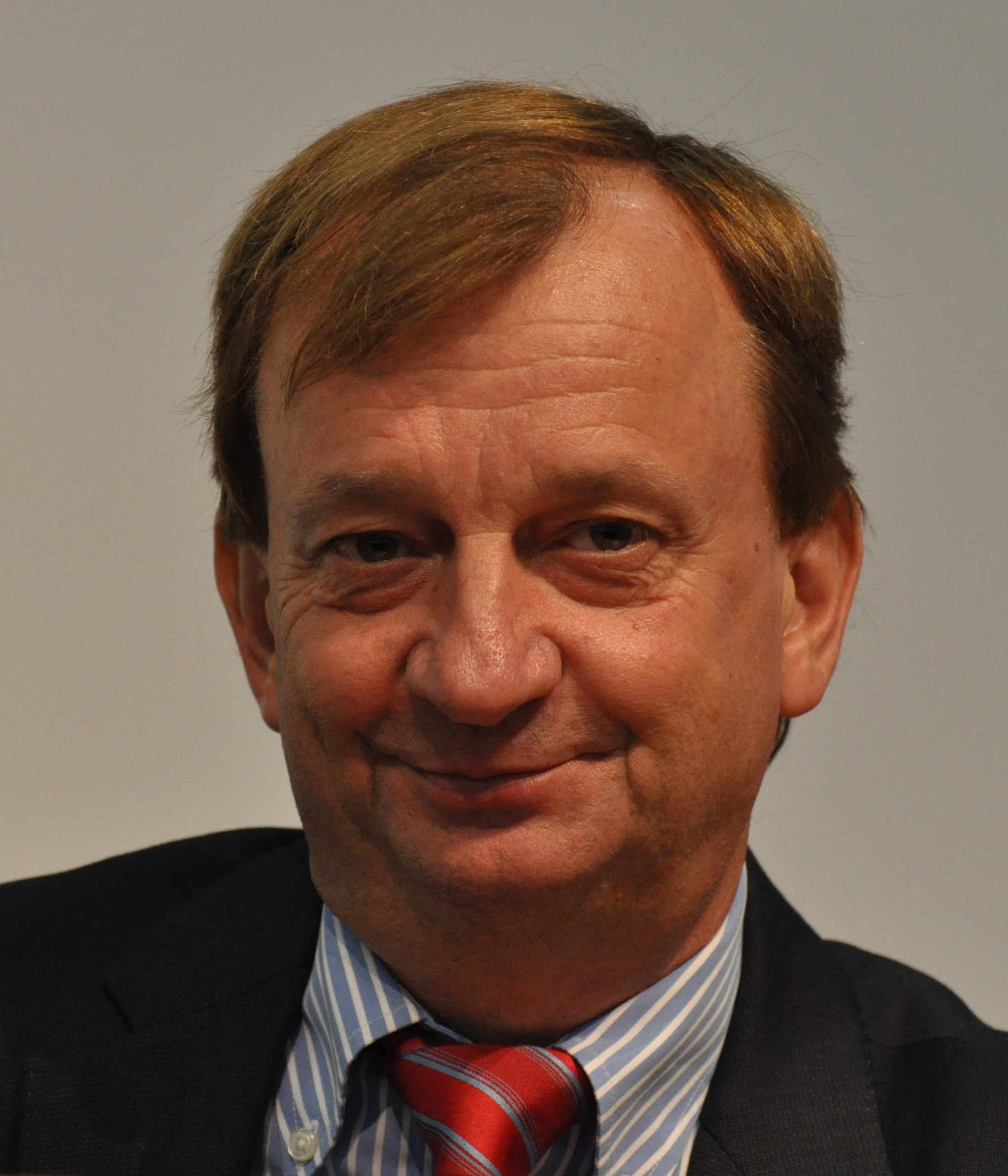
	First party	Second party	Third party
Leader	Antti Rinne	Jussi Halla-aho	Petteri Orpo
Party	SDP	Finns	National Coalition
Last election	34 seats, 16.5%	38 seats, 17.7%	37 seats, 18.2%
Seats won	40	39	38
Seat change	▲6	▲1	▲1
Popular vote	546,471	538,805	523,957
Percentage	17.7%	17.5%	17.0%
Swing	▲1.2pp	▼0.2pp	▼1.2pp
	Fourth party	Fifth party	Sixth party
Leader	Juha Sipilä	Pekka Haavisto	Li Andersson
Party	Centre	Green	Left Alliance
Last election	49 seats, 21.1%	15 seats, 8.5%	12 seats, 7.1%
Seats won	31	20	16
Seat change	▼18	▲5	▲4
Popular vote	423,920	354,194	251,808
Percentage	13.8%	11.5%	8.2%
Swing	▼7.3pp	▲3.0pp	▲1.1pp
	Seventh party	Eighth party	Ninth party
Leader	Anna-Maja Henriksson	Sari Essayah	Harry Harkimo
Party	RKP	KD	Liik
Last election	9 seats, 4.9%	5 seats, 3.5%	–
Seats won	9	5	1
Seat change	0	0	New
Popular vote	139,640	120,144	69,427
Percentage	4.5%	3.9%	2.3%
Swing	▼0.4pp	▲0.4pp	New
- Results by constituency
Prime Minister before election
Juha Sipilä
Centre
Prime Minister after election
Antti Rinne
SDP

Parliamentary elections were held in Finland on 14 April 2019. For the first time, no party received more than 20% of the vote. The Centre Party, which had been the largest party following the 2015 elections, dropped to fourth place, losing 18 seats and recording its lowest vote share since 1917. The Social Democratic Party saw the biggest gains, winning six more seats and narrowly becoming the largest party for the first time since 1999. The Green League and the Left Alliance also gained five and four seats respectively.

The Finns Party and the National Coalition Party gained one seat each, with the Finns Party recovering the seats it had lost in the previous parliament when 21 of its MPs left to form Blue Reform, which failed to win a seat. The Swedish People's Party and the Christian Democrats retained all of their seats that they had won in the previous elections. The Åland Coalition retained their seat in Åland, whilst Harry Harkimo, a former National Coalition MP who founded Movement Now twelve months earlier, was reelected in his constituency, thus giving his own movement its first elected MP.

Social Democratic Party leader Antti Rinne subsequently formed a coalition government with the Centre Party, Green League, Left Alliance and Swedish People's Party. Due to the Centre Party's devastating defeat, outgoing party leader and Prime Minister Juha Sipilä consequently announced that he would continue as the chairman only until the party's next convention in September 2019.

== Background ==
The incumbent government was formed by a three party center-right coalition, composed of the Centre Party, Finns Party and National Coalition Party. On 28 May 2015, the parliament elected Juha Sipilä as prime minister by a vote of 128–62.

=== 2017 government crisis ===
On 10 June 2017, the Finns Party elected Jussi Halla-aho as the new leader of the party, after the long-time leader Timo Soini had decided to step down. Following the talks among the three coalition leaders, Sipilä and Minister of Finance Petteri Orpo announced that they would no longer cooperate in a coalition government with the Finns Party. The collapse of government was averted on 13 June when twenty MPs defected from the Finns Party's parliamentary group, forming what would eventually become the Blue Reform party. One MP (Kike Elomaa) later returned to the Finns Party and another (Kaj Turunen) defected to National Coalition Party, leaving the Blue Reform with 18 and Finns Party with 17 MPs. Veera Ruoho furthermore defected to the National Coalition. Sipilä's government retained a majority in the Parliament as the Blue Reform continued as a member of the coalition and the Finns Party was moved to the opposition.

On 8 March 2019, prime minister Sipilä resigned. However, that same day president Sauli Niinistö reappointed him as head of a caretaker government. According to Sipilä, his government collapsed because of the failure to reach agreement on the controversial health care reform. But several Finnish political analysts (Thomas Karv, Teivo Teivainen) interpreted his resignation as a strategic move that could give the coalition parties, Sipilä's Centre Party in particular, more freedom during the election campaign. Thus, the Centre Party might be able to revive itself in the polls, in which the party was lagging behind the Social Democrats.

== Campaign ==
After the Oulu child sexual exploitation scandal, support for the anti-immigration Finns Party surged from around 9% in late 2018 to 17.5% by the election.

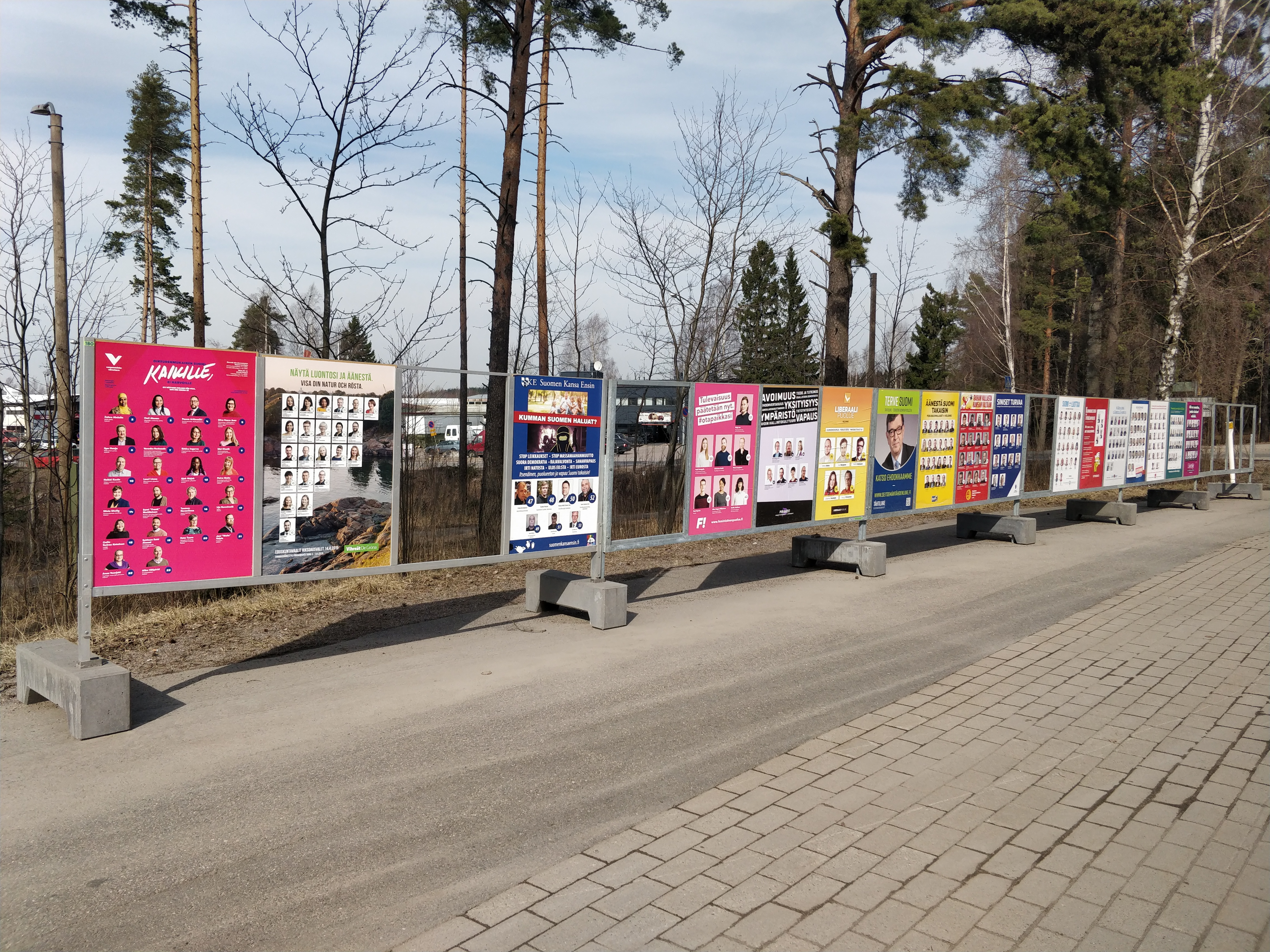
2019 Finnish parliamentary election, candidate Posters

The Social Democrats proposed raising taxes to fund the country's welfare system.

The election saw "an unusual level of aggression on the campaign trail", especially considering "attacks on politicians are rare in Finland". In late March, a man struck Left Alliance candidate Suldaan Said Ahmed in the chest while calling him an infidel and pedophile a day after a man wearing logos of far-right anti-immigrant group Soldiers of Odin attempted to attack Foreign Minister Timo Soini of the Blue Party.

== Electoral system ==
The 200 members of the Eduskunta were elected using proportional representation in 13 multi-member constituencies, with seats allocated according to the D'Hondt method. The number of elected representatives is proportional to the population in the district six months prior to the elections. Åland has single member electoral district and its own party system. Compared to the previous election in 2015, one seat was reallocated from Savo-Karelia to Uusimaa.

Electoral district	Seats
01 Helsinki	22
02 Uusimaa	36
03 Finland Proper	17
04 Satakunta	8
05 Åland	1
06 Häme	14
07 Pirkanmaa	19
08 Southeast Finland	17
09 Savo-Karelia	15
10 Vaasa	16
11 Central Finland	10
12 Oulu	18
13 Lapland	7

== Opinion polls ==
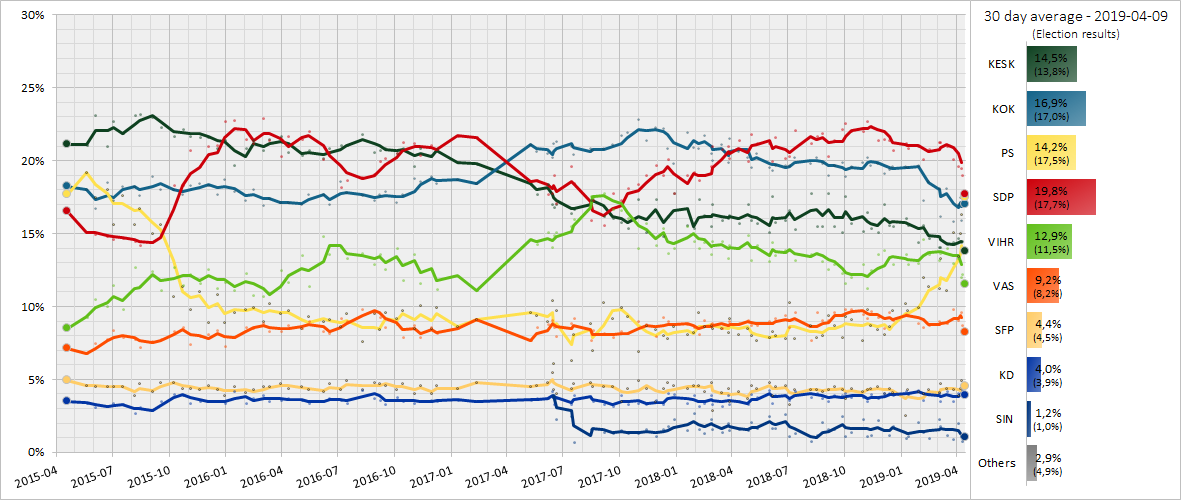

== Results ==
Parties' vote share in each constituency

Voter turnout was 72%, the highest since 1987. The highest turnout was in the Helsinki constituency, where the turnout was 78%. The lowest was in Savo-Karelia constituency at 67% and Åland constituency at 60%. Women had a slightly higher turnout of 74% compared for men who had a turnout of 71%.

Party	Votes	%	Seats	+/–
Social Democratic Party	546,471	17.73	40	+6
Finns Party	538,805	17.48	39	+1
National Coalition Party	523,957	17.00	38	+1
Centre Party	423,920	13.76	31	–18
Green League	354,194	11.49	20	+5
Left Alliance	251,808	8.17	16	+4
Swedish People's Party	139,640	4.53	9	0
Christian Democrats	120,144	3.90	5	0
Movement Now	69,427	2.25	1	New
Blue Reform	29,943	0.97	0	New
Pirate Party	19,032	0.62	0	0
For Åland (C–L–M–S–ÅF)	11,640	0.38	1	0
Seven Star Movement	11,366	0.37	0	New
Citizens' Party	7,645	0.25	0	New
Feminist Party	6,662	0.22	0	New
Liberal Party – Freedom to Choose	5,014	0.16	0	New
Communist Party	4,305	0.14	0	0
Animal Justice Party	3,378	0.11	0	New
Independence Party	2,444	0.08	0	0
Finnish People First	2,366	0.08	0	New
Communist Workers' Party – For Peace and Socialism	1,240	0.04	0	0
Aito suomalainen yhteislista	589	0.02	0	New
Reform List	525	0.02	0	New
Alternative for Åland (ÅD)	358	0.01	0	–
Rehtiliike yhteislista	344	0.01	0	New
Yhteislista Jaana ja Leo	87	0.00	0	New
Independents	6,612	0.21	0	0
Total	3,081,916	100.00	200	0
Valid votes	3,081,916	99.42		
Invalid/blank votes	17,844	0.58		
Total votes	3,099,760	100.00		
Registered voters/turnout	4,510,040	68.73		
Source: Vaalit

== Government formation ==
During election debates, the Social Democrats, the National Coalition Party, Green League, Left Alliance, and the Swedish People's Party stated that they were interested in joining a coalition that does not include the Finns Party. Despite being ruled-out by five parties, Finns Party chairman Jussi Halla-aho said that all parties should show responsibility when forming a coalition. He said the most responsible way to form a coalition is to include the Finns Party.

Two weeks later, SDP chairman Antti Rinne, who was expected to lead the government, sent a questionnaire to each of the other parties, to assess their positions on various topics such as basic income, collective bargaining, climate change or health care reform. Based on the answers and initial talks with all parties, Rinne announced that he would negotiate forming a government with Centre Party, Green League, Left Alliance and Swedish People's Party. The negotiations were ultimately successful, and the Rinne Cabinet was formally inaugurated on 6 June.
