= Minister for Development Cooperation and Foreign Trade (Finland) =

Finnish cabinet position

The Minister for Development Cooperation and Foreign Trade (Finnish: kehitysyhteistyö- ja ulkomaankauppaministeri, Swedish: utvecklings- och utrikeshandelsminister, formerly Minister for Foreign Trade and Development) is one of the 19 ministerial portfolios represented in the Finnish Government. The Minister for Development Cooperation and Foreign Trade is one of the Ministry for Foreign Affairs' three ministerial positions; the other two are the Minister for Foreign Affairs and the Minister for Nordic Cooperation. The incumbent Minister for Development Cooperation and Foreign Trade for the Orpo Cabinet is Ville Tavio of the Finns Party.
