= Antti Rinne =

Prime Minister of Finland in 2019

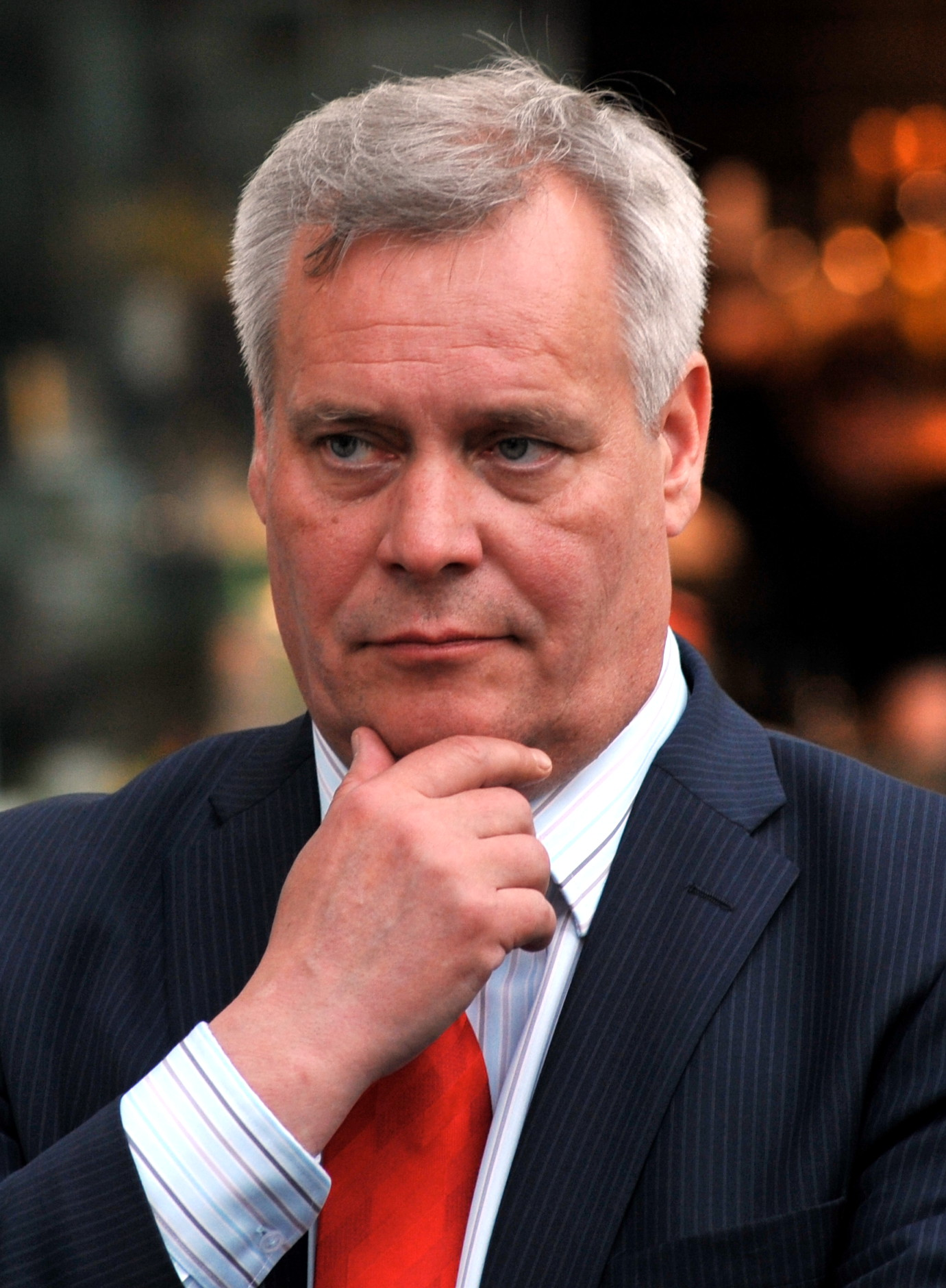
- Rinne in 2019

45th Prime Minister of Finland
- In office 6 June 2019 – 10 December 2019
- President: Sauli Niinistö
- Deputy: Mika Lintilä; Katri Kulmuni
- Preceded by: Juha Sipilä
- Succeeded by: Sanna Marin

Deputy Prime Minister of Finland
- In office 6 June 2014 – 29 May 2015
- Prime Minister: Jyrki Katainen; Alexander Stubb
- Preceded by: Jutta Urpilainen
- Succeeded by: Timo Soini

Speaker of the Parliament of Finland
- In office 24 April 2019 – 5 June 2019
- Preceded by: Paula Risikko
- Succeeded by: Matti Vanhanen

Deputy Speaker of the Parliament of Finland
- In office 11 December 2019 – 16 December 2020
- Speaker: Matti Vanhanen; Anu Vehviläinen
- Preceded by: Tuula Haatainen
- Succeeded by: Tarja Filatov

Minister of Finance
- In office 6 June 2014 – 29 May 2015
- Prime Minister: Jyrki Katainen; Alexander Stubb
- Preceded by: Jutta Urpilainen
- Succeeded by: Alexander Stubb

Leader of the Social Democratic Party
- In office 9 May 2014 – 22 August 2020
- Preceded by: Jutta Urpilainen
- Succeeded by: Sanna Marin

Personal details
- Born: 3 November 1962 (age 63) Helsinki, Uusimaa, Finland
- Party: Social Democratic
- Spouse: Heta Ravolainen
- Education: University of Helsinki

Antti Juhani Rinne (Note: Finnish pronunciation: [ˈɑntːi ˈjuhɑni ˈrinːe]) (born 3 November 1962) is a Finnish politician who served as speaker of the Parliament of Finland from April to June 2019 and Prime Minister of Finland from June to December 2019. He led the Social Democratic Party from 2014 until 2020. In August 2023, he was hired as the General Secretary of SAMAK for a three-year term.

== Biography ==
A lawyer by profession, Rinne holds a Candidate of Law degree from the University of Helsinki. He served as chair of the Union of Private Sector Professionals (ERTO) from 2002 to 2005, the Union of Salaried Employees from 2005 to 2010, as well as Trade Union Pro from 2010 to 2014.

== Political activities ==
Rinne was elected chairman of the Social Democratic Party of Finland (SDP) on 9 May 2014, defeating Jutta Urpilainen. In 2017, he was elected for a second term as chair of the Social Democratic Party.

He was Minister of Finance and Deputy Prime Minister of Finland between 2014 and 2015 and has been a Member of Parliament since 2015 until 2023. In the 2019 parliamentary election, Rinne led the Social Democrats to victory and served as Speaker of Parliament before being appointed Prime Minister on 6 June 2019.

=== Rinne cabinet ===
Rinne and his cabinet resigned on 3 December 2019, when the Centre Party withdrew its support due to the 2019 Finnish postal strike. President Sauli Niinistö asked him to continue with a caretaker government until a new government was appointed. On 10 December 2019, Sanna Marin was appointed as Prime Minister of Finland.

On 11 December 2019, Rinne was elected as the First Deputy Speaker of the Parliament, replacing Tuula Haatainen, who was then named as the Minister of Employment in the Marin Cabinet.

Rinne ran in the 2023 Finnish parliamentary election, but was not re-elected. In August 2023, Rinne was hired as the General Secretary of SAMAK for a three-year term.

== Controversies ==
In 2017, Antti Rinne provoked some controversy by encouraging Finns to reproduce.

Antti Rinne was convicted of organizing an illegal strike with the trade union Pro against the forest industry. The conviction was upheld by an appellate court with an additional decision at the end of 2018 which also ordered Rinne to pay fines and legal costs to Metsäteollisuus, and advocacy group for the forest industry.

Rinne had to resign from an ACP (Automotive, Cargo and Ports worker's union, Finnish: AKT) lawyer position, because he had charged twice for the same work-related commute. According to him, it had been the result of negligence and amounted to only about FIM 1,000 (€200). In 2005, the President of the ACP stated in an interview with the Suomen Kuvalehti that it was actually FIM 10,000 (€2,000).

In a second court case discussed, Rinne was the manager of a housing company in Lohja, Finland. The Suomen Kuvalehti reported that he had failed to return the receipts for the year and had paid for his own telephone bill from the housing company's bank account. FIM 25,000 (€5,000) of damages were claimed from him by the housing company.

In 2022, Rinne applied for the position of Mayor of Lohja. Rinne's party has had a long history of governing Lohja, but 2022’s election results shifted the city council to the right. The city council started deciding on the next mayor in May 2022. The mayor's selection group was led by Joona Räsänen, but he recused himself, as Rinne is his godparent.

== Recognitions ==
Rinne was awarded the Swedish Assembly of Finland medal of merit in 2024.

== Notes ==
Party political offices
Preceded by Jutta Urpilainen	Leader of the Social Democratic Party; 2014–2020	Succeeded by Sanna Marin
Political offices
Preceded by Jutta Urpilainen	Deputy Prime Minister of Finland; 2014–2015	Succeeded by Timo Soini
Preceded by Jutta Urpilainen	Minister of Finance; 2014–2015	Succeeded by Alexander Stubb
Preceded by Juha Sipilä	Prime Minister of Finland; 6 June – 10 December 2019	Succeeded by Sanna Marin
