= Sanna Marin =

Prime Minister of Finland from 2019 to 2023

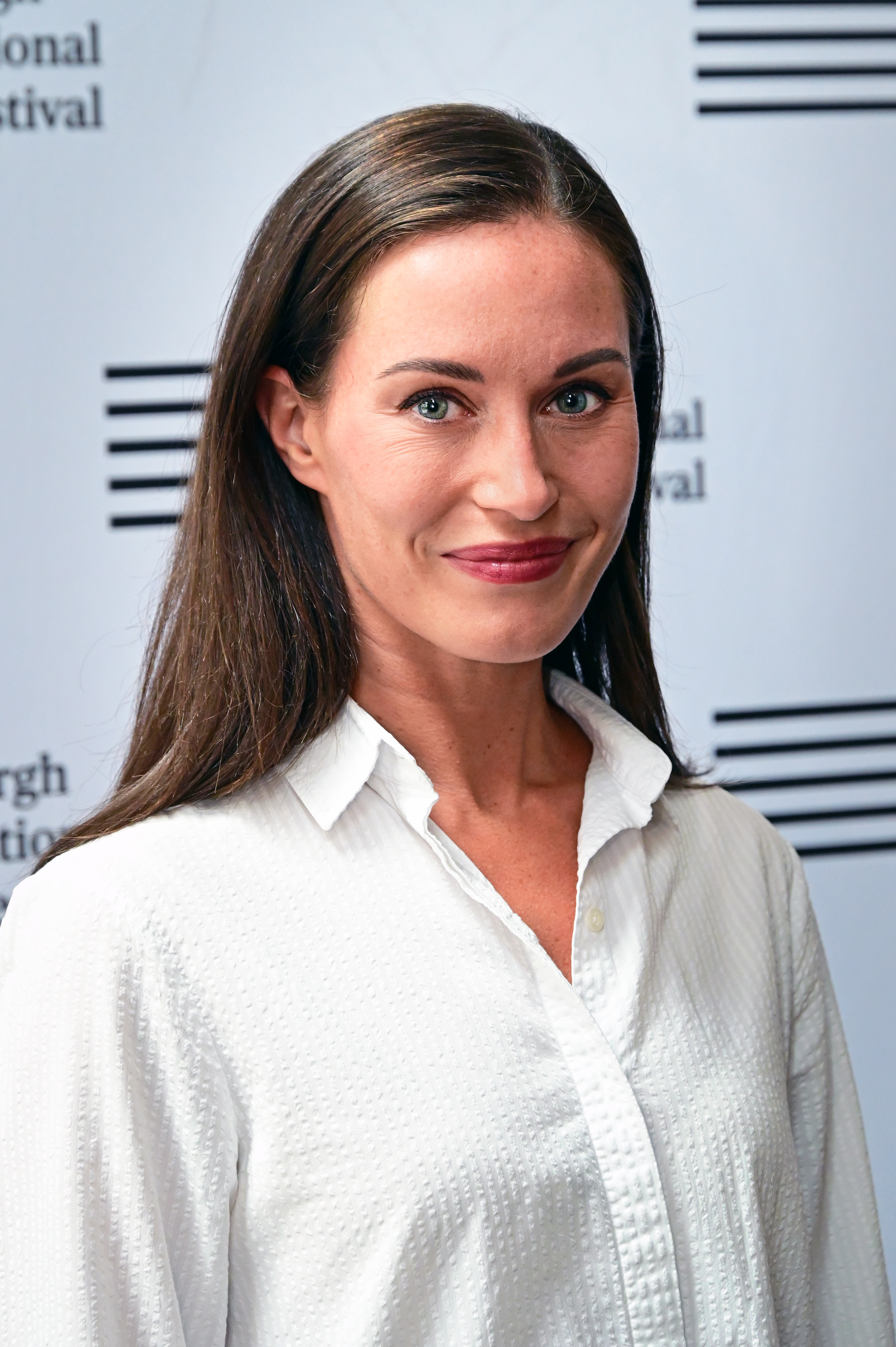
- Marin in 2026

46th Prime Minister of Finland
- In office 10 December 2019 – 20 June 2023
- President: Sauli Niinistö
- Deputy: Katri Kulmuni; Matti Vanhanen; Annika Saarikko
- Preceded by: Antti Rinne
- Succeeded by: Petteri Orpo

Leader of the Social Democratic Party
- In office 23 August 2020 – 1 September 2023
- Preceded by: Antti Rinne
- Succeeded by: Antti Lindtman

Minister of Transport and Communications
- In office 6 June 2019 – 10 December 2019
- Prime Minister: Antti Rinne
- Preceded by: Anu Vehviläinen
- Succeeded by: Timo Harakka

Member of the Finnish Parliament
- In office 22 April 2015 – 12 September 2023
- Constituency: Pirkanmaa

Personal details
- Born: Sanna Mirella Marin; 16 November 1985 (age 41) Helsinki, Finland
- Party: Social Democratic
- Spouse: Markus Räikkönen (m. 2020; div. 2023)
- Children: 1
- Education: University of Tampere

Sanna Mirella Marin (Note: Finnish pronunciation: [ˈsɑnːɑ ˈmirelːɑ ˈmɑriːn]) (born 16 November 1985) is a Finnish politician who served as prime minister of Finland from 2019 to 2023 and as the leader of the Social Democratic Party of Finland (SDP) from 2020 to 2023. She was a Member of Parliament from 2015 to 2023. She was re-elected as member of parliament in April 2023 but resigned to become a strategic adviser on political leaders' reform programmes in the Tony Blair Institute in September 2023.

Marin was born in Helsinki but as a child moved with her mother to Tampere, where she later graduated from the University of Tampere. She joined the Social Democratic Youth in 2006, later serving as its vice president from 2010 to 2012. She served as a member of the City Council of Tampere and was later elected member of Parliament. Following Antti Rinne's resignation in the wake of the postal strike controversy, Marin was selected as prime minister on 8 December 2019. Taking office at the age of 34, she was the youngest person to hold the office in Finnish history.

As prime minister, Marin led the response to the COVID-19 pandemic by invoking a state of emergency. She condemned the 2022 Russian invasion of Ukraine and has been a vocal supporter of Ukraine. Together with president Sauli Niinistö, she announced that Finland would apply for NATO membership in May 2022; Finland successfully joined NATO in April 2023. In the 2023 parliamentary election, her party lost its status as the largest party, coming in as third in vote and seat share, and she was succeeded as prime minister by Petteri Orpo of the National Coalition Party. She was the leader of the SDP until September 2023, when she retired from Finnish politics.

== Early life and education ==
Sanna Mirella Marin was born on 16 November 1985 in Helsinki. She also lived in Espoo and Pirkkala before moving to Tampere. Her parents separated when she was very young; the family faced financial problems and Marin's father, Lauri Marin, struggled with alcoholism. After her biological parents separated, Marin was brought up by her mother and her mother's female partner.

Marin graduated from the Pirkkala High School (Pirkkalan Yhteislukio) in 2004 at the age of 19, becoming the first person in her immediate family to graduate from high school. In her youth she worked in a bakery and as a cashier, among other jobs, later being enrolled at the University of Tampere from 2007 to 2017. She obtained her bachelor's and master's degree in administrative science in 2012 and 2017, respectively, majoring in municipal and regional governance. She was the first person in her family to attend university.

== Early political career ==
Marin's political career was described by the BBC as "beginning at the age of 20", in the years following her high school graduation and beginning her affiliation with the Social Democratic Youth. Marin joined the Social Democratic Youth in 2006 and served as its first director from 2010 to 2012.

In 2008, she ran unsuccessfully for election to the City Council of Tampere, but stood again and was elected in the 2012 elections. She became chairwoman of the City Council within months, serving from 2013 to 2017. In 2017, she was re-elected to the City Council. She first gained prominence after video clips of her chairing contentious meetings were shared on YouTube.

Marin was elected second deputy chairman of the SDP in 2014. In 2015, she was elected to the Finnish Parliament as an MP from the electoral district of Pirkanmaa. Four years later, she was re-elected. On 6 June 2019, she became Minister of Transport and Communications. On 23 August 2020, Marin was elected chair of the SDP, succeeding Antti Rinne.

== Prime Minister of Finland (2019–2023) ==
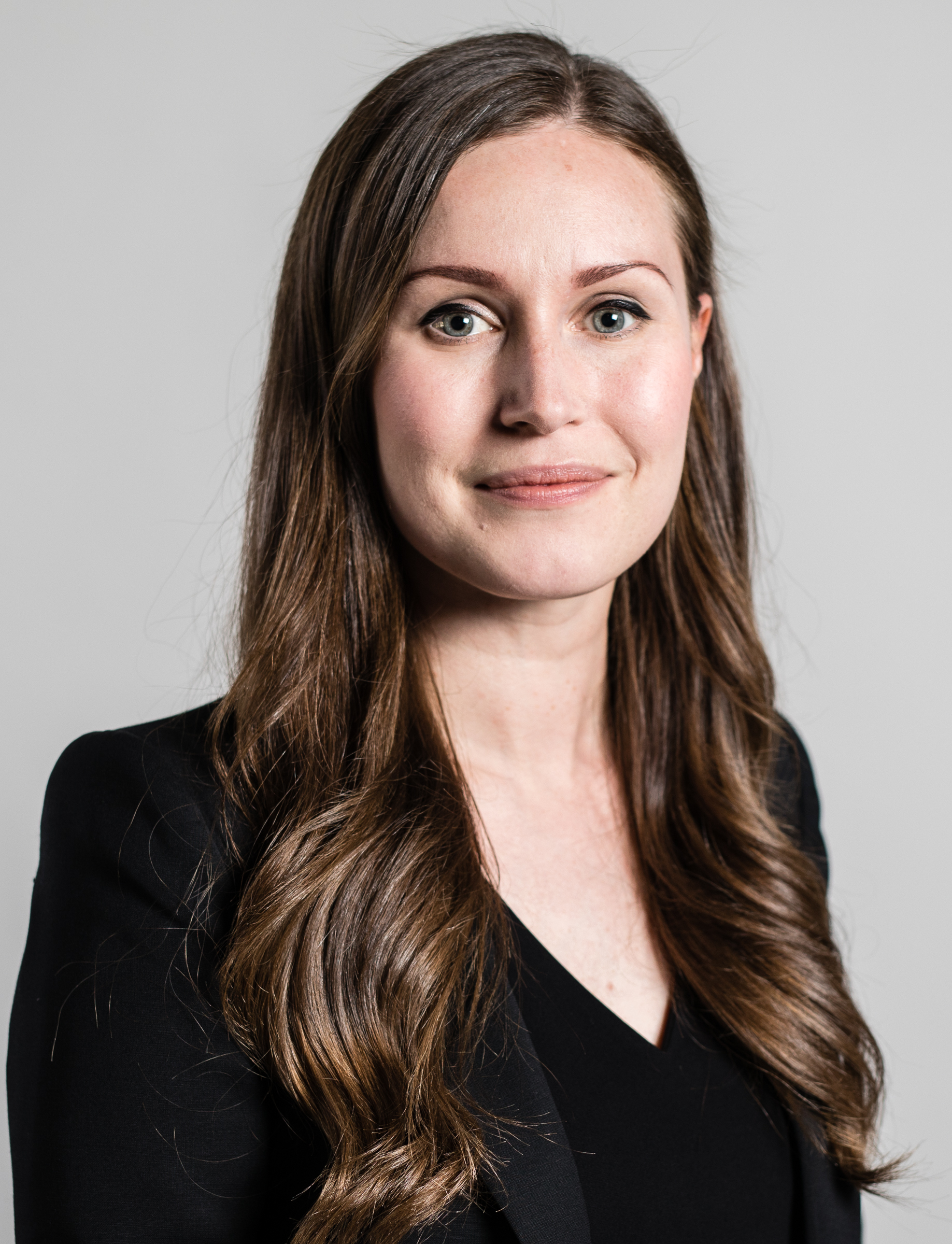
- Premiership of Sanna Marin; 10 December 2019 – 20 June 2023
- Prime Minister: Sanna Marin
- Cabinet: Marin Cabinet
- Party: Social Democratic
- Appointed by: Sauli Niinistö
- Seat: Kesäranta
- Seal of the Prime Minister

In December 2019, Marin was nominated by the SDP to succeed Antti Rinne as the prime minister of Finland, but Rinne formally remained party leader until June 2020. In a narrow vote, Marin prevailed over Antti Lindtman. A majority of the ministers in her five-party cabinet were women, numbering 12 out of 19 at the time of the cabinet's formation. She is the third and longest-serving female head of government in Finland, after Anneli Jäätteenmäki and Mari Kiviniemi.

Upon her confirmation by the Finnish parliament at the age of 34, she became Finland's youngest-ever Prime Minister, making her the then youngest serving head of government until Sebastian Kurz regained that description in January 2020.

During the global COVID-19 pandemic in 2020, the Marin Cabinet invoked a state of emergency in Finland to alleviate the epidemic, in connection with which, among other things, the Uusimaa region was temporarily isolated from the rest of Finland. When Swedish prime minister Stefan Löfven could not attend a European Council meeting in October 2020 because of his mother's funeral, Marin stepped in to represent Sweden. In return, Marin asked Löfven to represent Finland at a council meeting later that month.

Marin's SDP came third in the 2023 Finnish parliamentary election. She announced that she would resign as leader of SDP at the party congress, to be held in autumn. She was succeeded by Petteri Orpo as prime minister of Finland on 20 June 2023.

=== Foreign policy ===
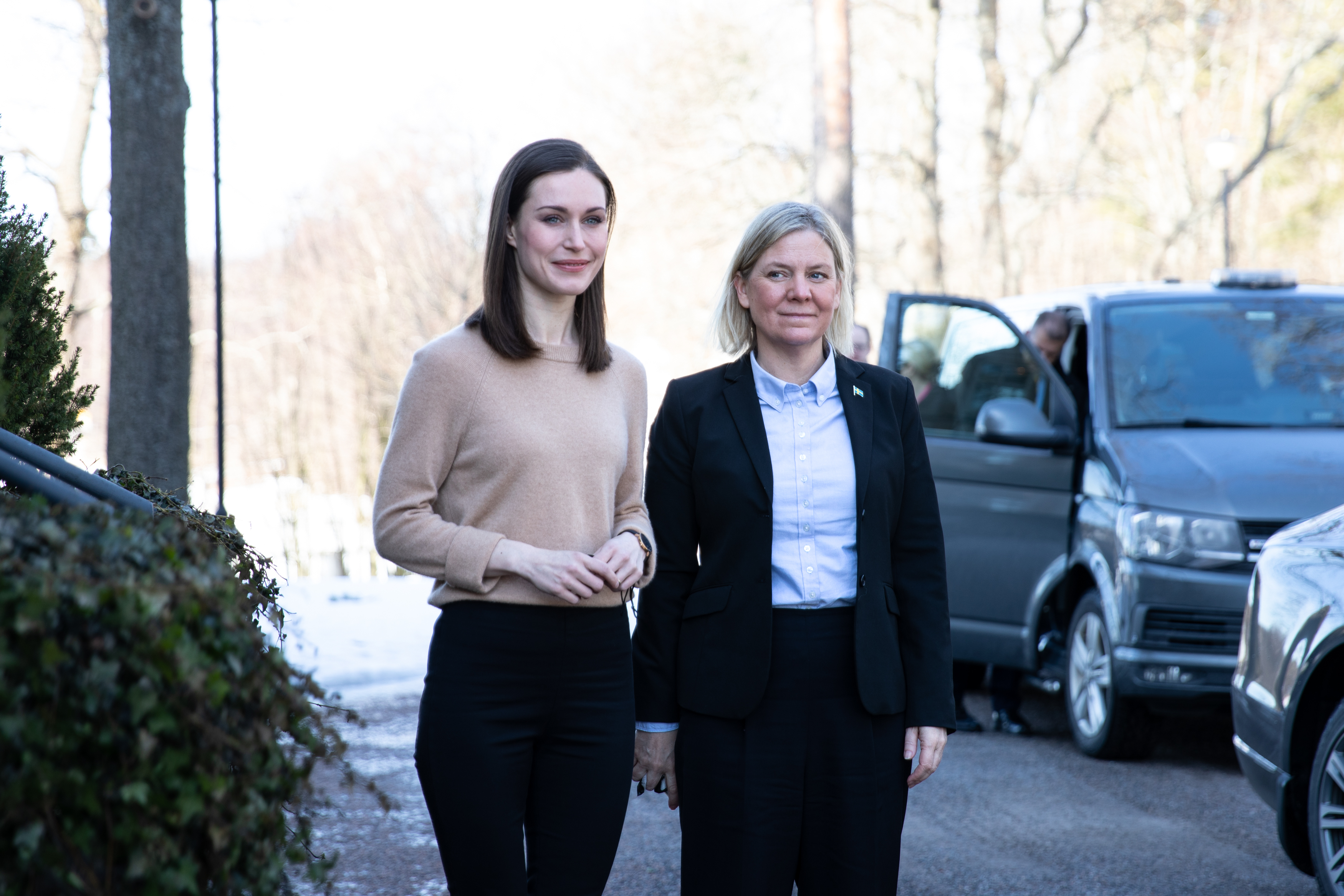
Marin and Swedish Prime Minister Magdalena Andersson during talks about potential NATO memberships for Finland and Sweden in the spring of 2022

In March 2021, Marin condemned the persecution of ethnic Uyghurs in the Chinese province of Xinjiang. She emphasised that "trade or the economy is not a reason to ignore these atrocities".

=== Russian invasion of Ukraine ===
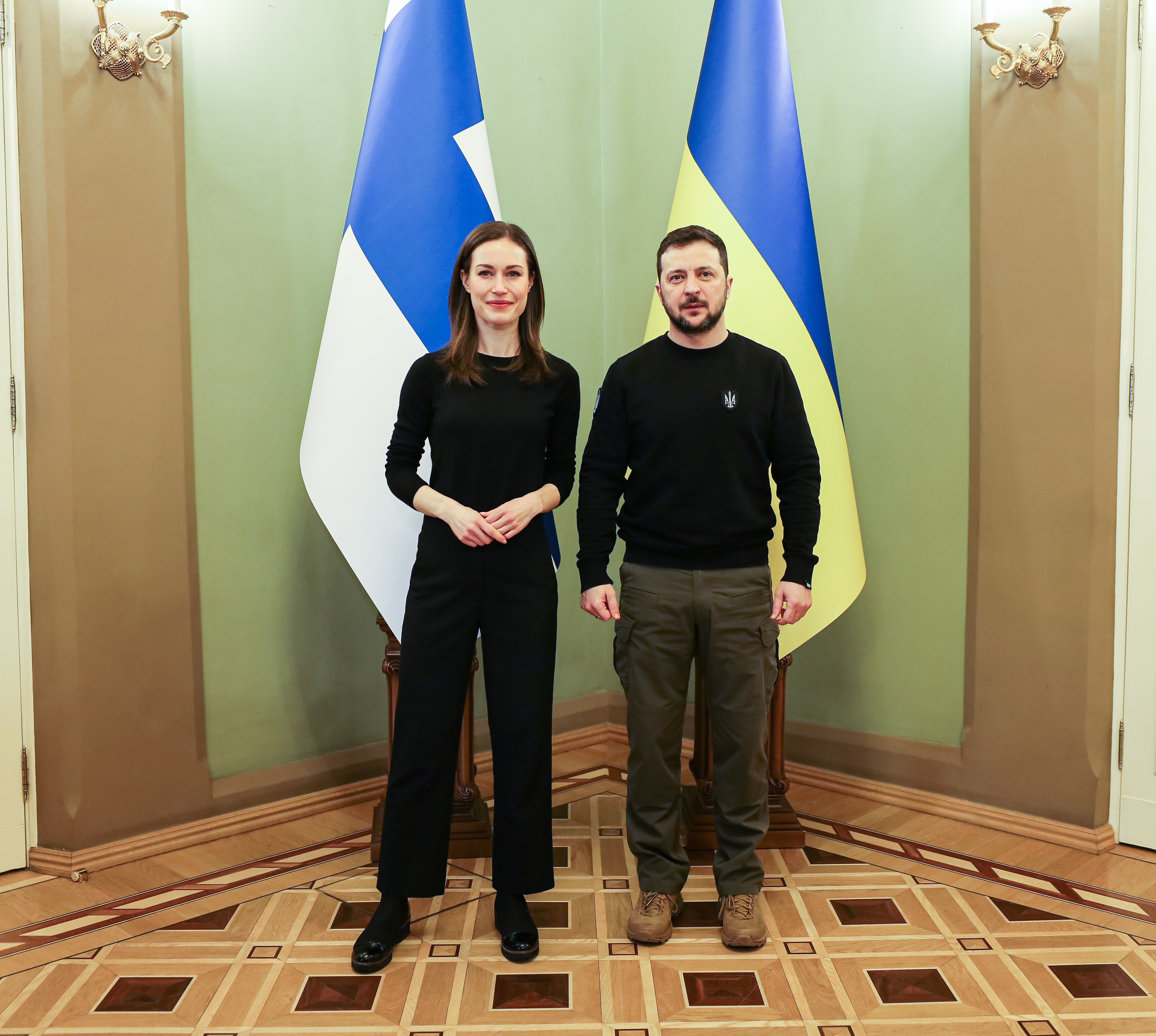
Marin and Ukrainian President Volodymyr Zelenskyy on 10 March 2023

On 24 February 2022, Russian president Vladimir Putin ordered the invasion of Ukraine. On 25 February, a Russian Foreign Ministry spokesperson threatened Finland and Sweden with "military and political consequences" if they attempted to join NATO, which neither were then actively seeking. Both countries had attended an emergency NATO summit as members of NATO's Partnership for Peace and both had condemned the invasion and had provided assistance to Ukraine.

In February, following the 2022 Russian invasion of Ukraine, Marin commented on Finland's potential membership, observing: "It is also now clear that the debate on NATO membership in Finland will change", while noting that a Finnish application to NATO would require widespread political and public support.

In March 2022, she said the EU needed to end its dependency on Russian oil, adding that "we have these very tough economic sanctions on the one hand, and on the other hand we are financing the Russian war by buying oil, natural gas and other fossil fuels from Russia."

On 4 March 2022, President of Finland Sauli Niinistö visited Washington, D.C. to meet with President Joe Biden and a number of other U.S. politicians and security personnel. In a press conference with Finnish media, Niinistö said that in the meeting the presidents discussed the Russian invasion of Ukraine and its impact on European and Finnish security. Furthermore, they agreed on deepening Finnish-US security co-operation and bilateral relations. On 26 May 2022, Marin went to Kyiv at the invitation of Ukrainian prime minister Denys Shmyhal, where she met President Volodymyr Zelenskyy and visited the war-torn cities of Irpin and Bucha. On 26 May 2022, Marin also signed a bilateral framework agreement on the rebuilding of Ukraine's education with Ukrainian prime minister Denys Shmyhal. On 31 May, she welcomed a deal agreed by all EU leaders to ban more than 90% of Russian oil imports by the end of the year, voting for it in the European Council.

In late November and early December 2022, Marin visited New Zealand and Australia, becoming the first Finnish prime minister to visit the two countries. She met with New Zealand prime minister Jacinda Ardern and Australian prime minister Anthony Albanese, and covered several issues including bilateral trade relations, the global economic situation, the Russian invasion of Ukraine and climate change mitigation.

On 10 March 2022, Marin said Finland could discuss transferring F/A-18 Hornets to Ukraine, subject to international cooperation, training requirements and Finland's own security situation. Finnish president Sauli Niinistö denied any discussions over the issue. The Finnish defence minister Antti Kaikkonen said that the Hornets would be required for the foreseeable future. Marin re-iterated her call for a fighter aircraft discussion as "the next big question" after main battle tanks, stating that Ukraine's defense against Russia requires heavier weaponry. She emphasized that Finland has no position on the issue yet.

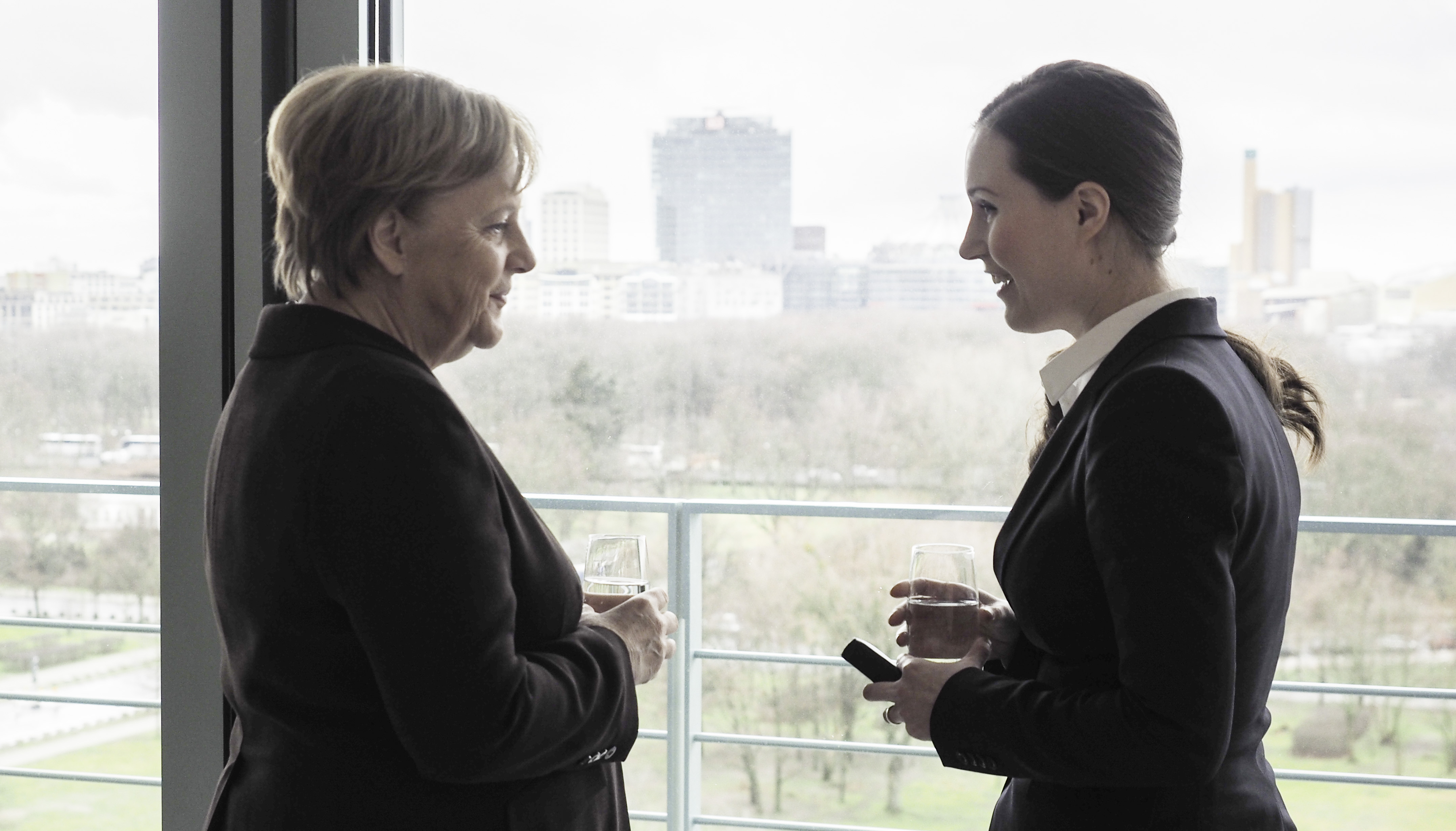
Marin and German Chancellor Angela Merkel on 19 February 2020

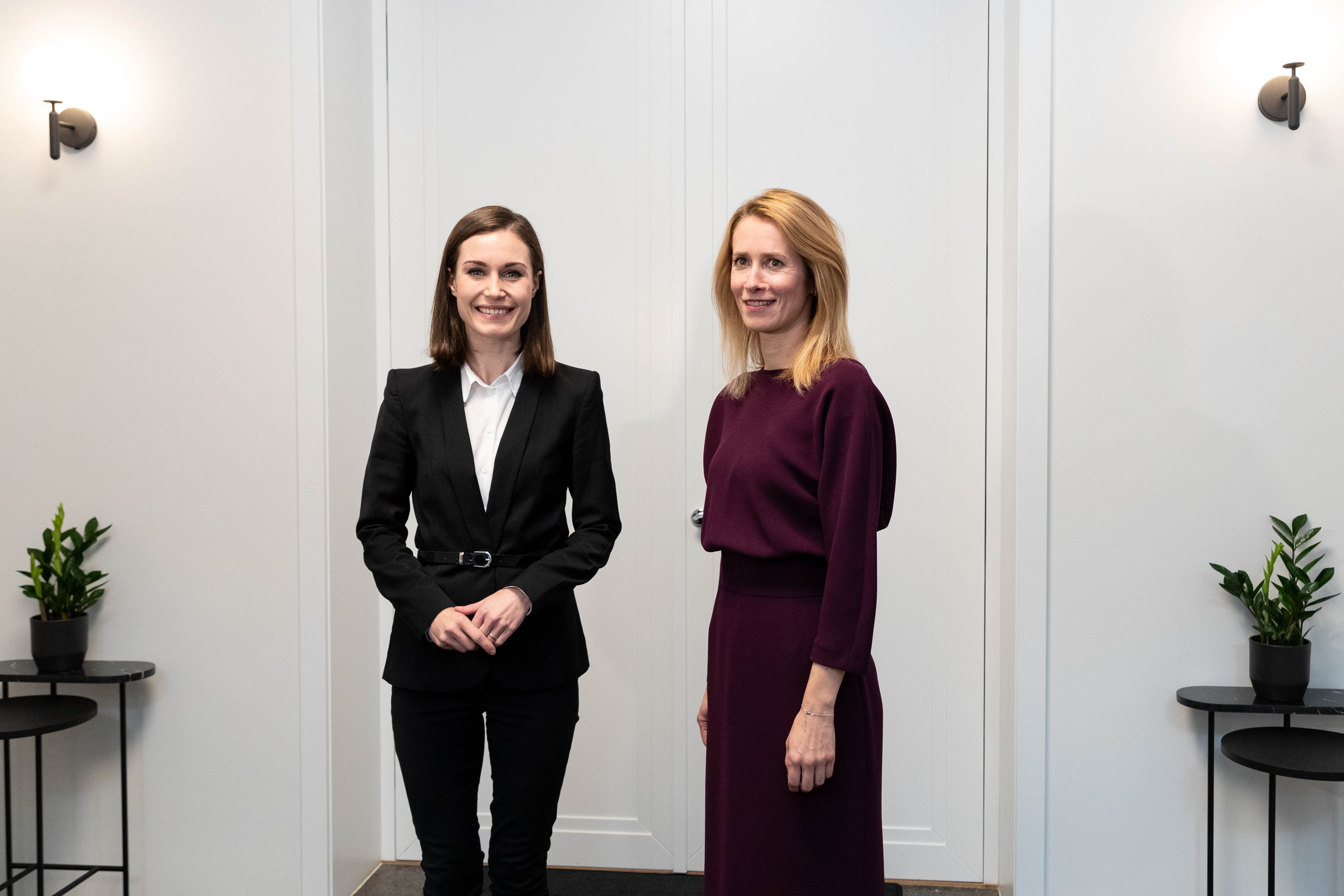
Marin and Estonian Prime Minister Kaja Kallas on 4 October 2021

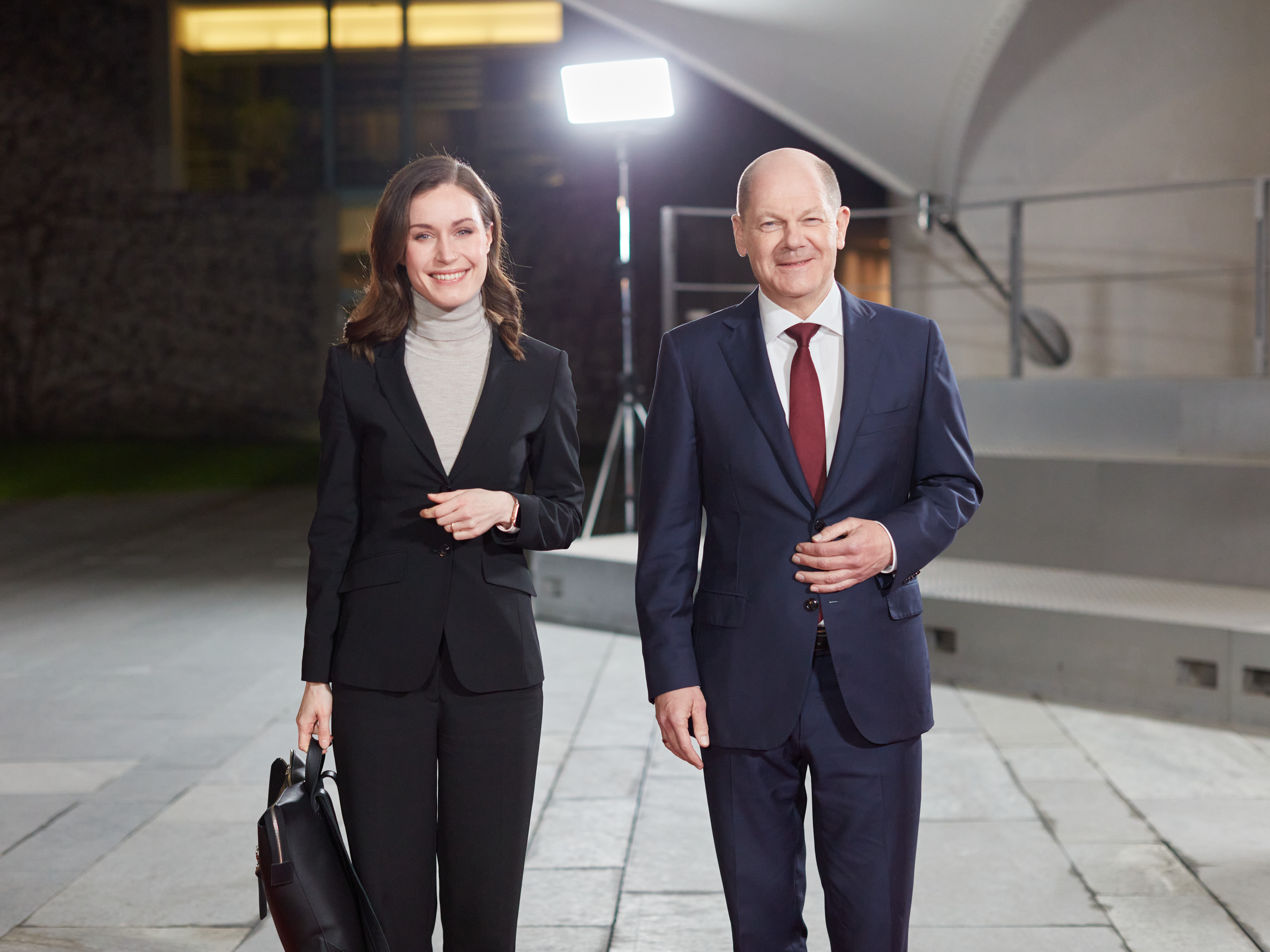
Marin and German Chancellor Olaf Scholz on 16 March 2022

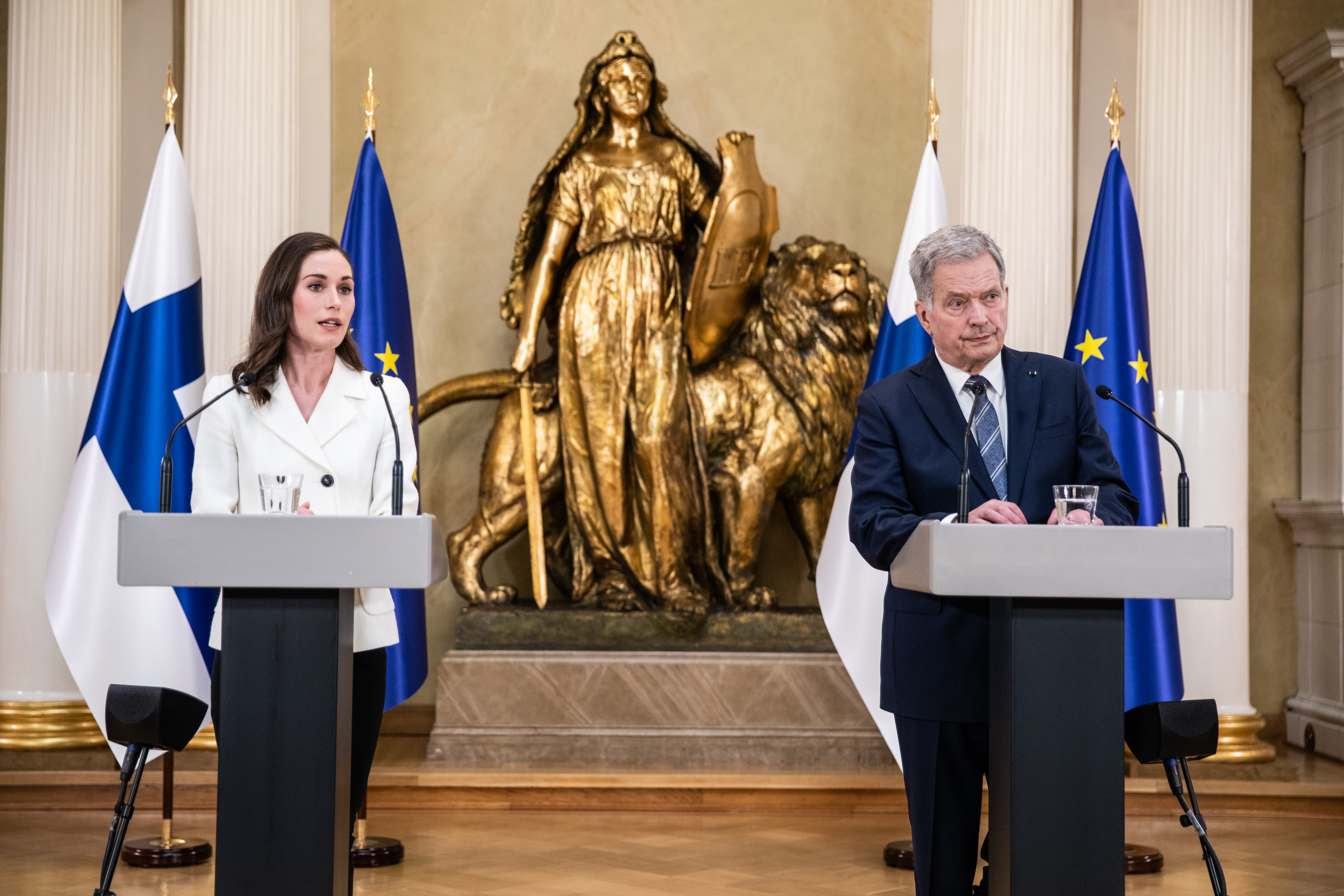
Marin and President Sauli Niinistö at the press conference announcing Finland's intent to apply to NATO on 15 May 2022

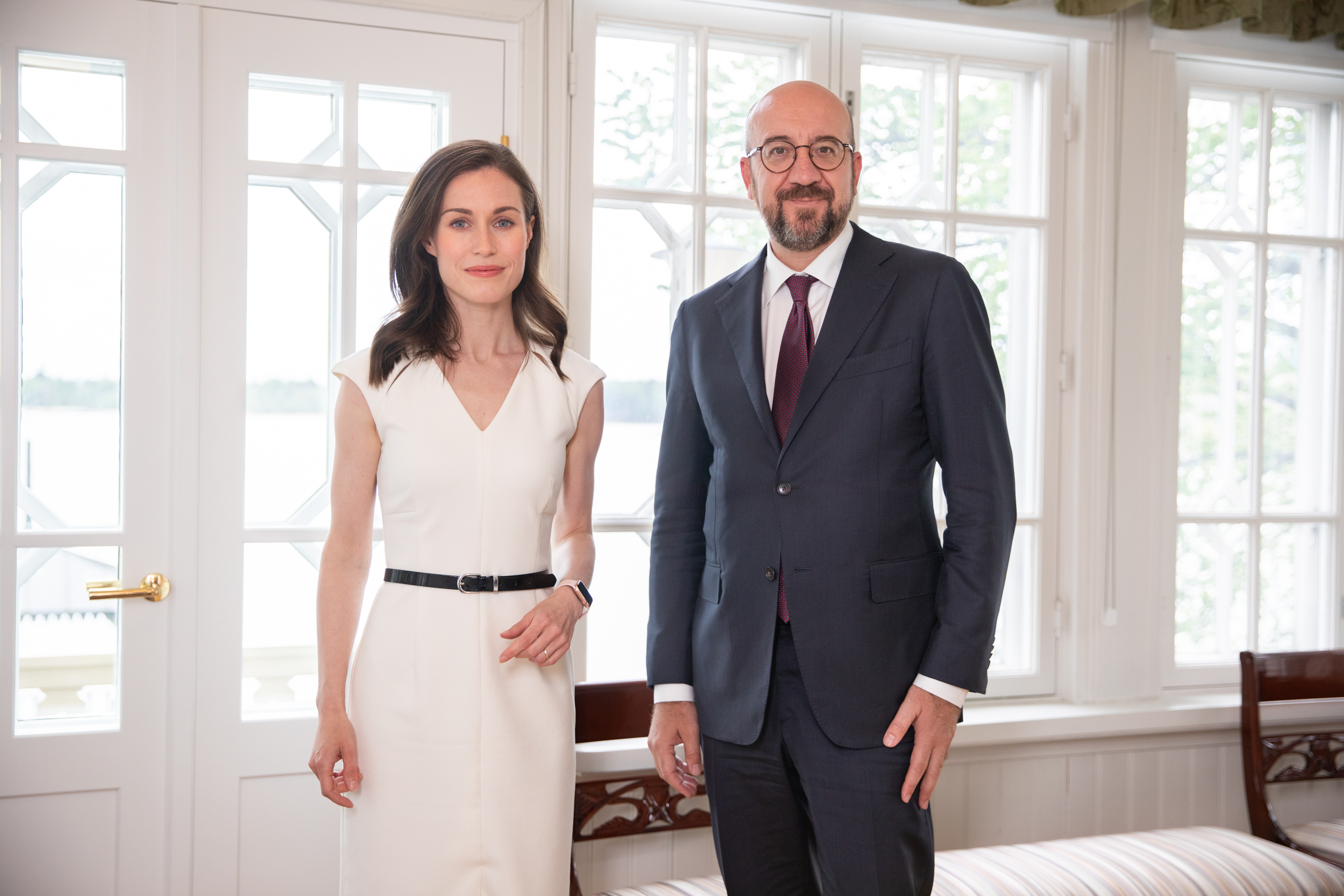
Marin and President of the European Council Charles Michel on 25 May 2022

=== Accession of Finland to NATO ===
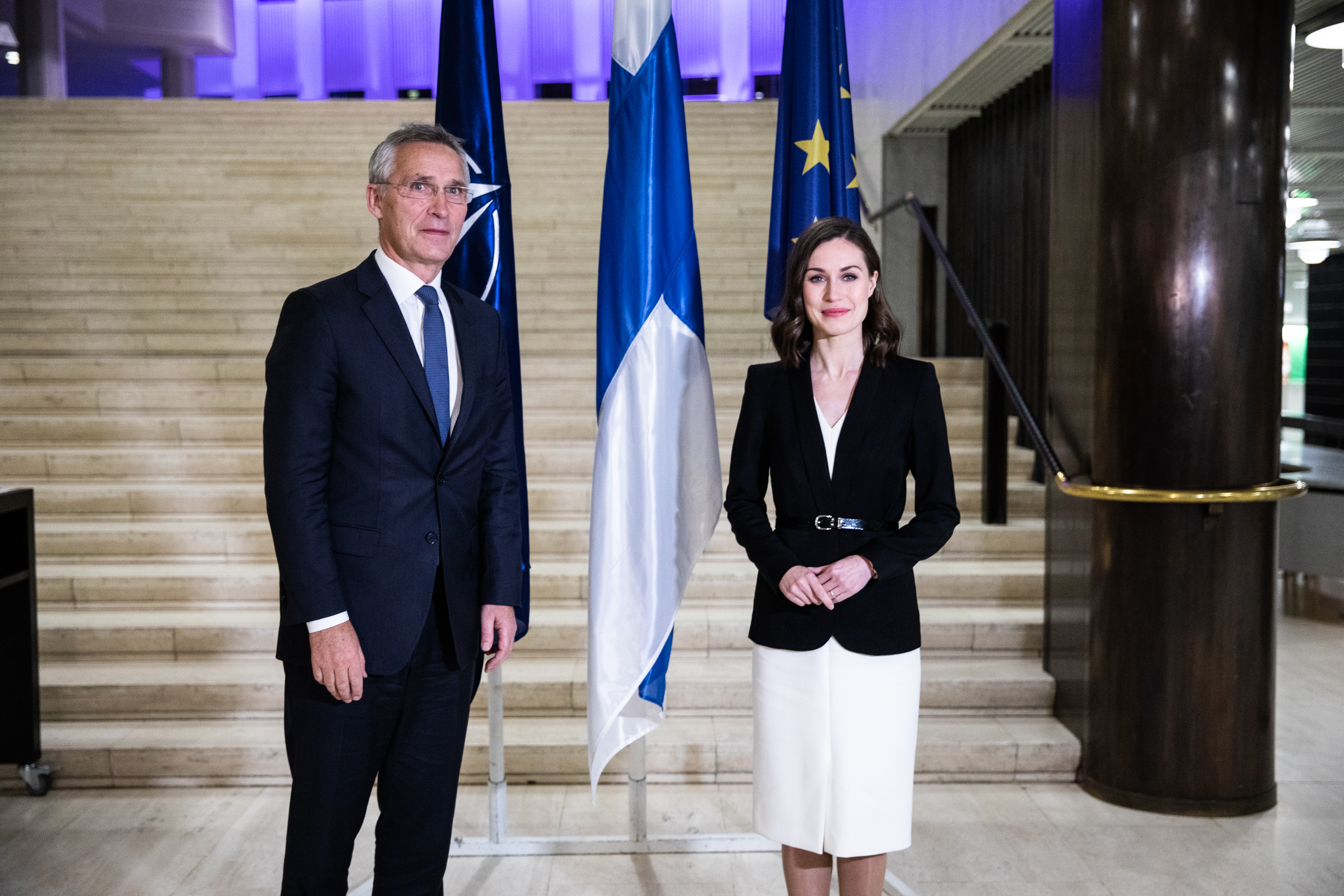
Marin and NATO Secretary General Jens Stoltenberg on 25 October 2021

Sanna Marin's attitude, as the vice chairman of SDP, was negative towards Finland joining NATO and pro-NATO statement by Finnish defence minister Carl Haglund after Russia conquered Crimea in 2014. That time the attitude for Finland to join NATO was negative, both among the government and majority of the citizens. Marin's attitude changed along with foreign political trends. During her year address at the beginning of 2022, in response to Russian aggression at the Russo-Ukrainian border, Marin stated that Finland had the right to join NATO if it wanted to, and should consider this option. This statement was responded to by some Russian media outlets with the phrase: "Moscow was stabbed in the back". On 12 May 2022, ten weeks after the beginning of the invasion, President Niinistö and Prime Minister Marin in a joint statement said that "Finland must apply for NATO membership without delay" as such membership "would strengthen Finland's security". On 15 May 2022, Niinistö and Marin announced that Finland would apply for NATO membership, and on 17 May the Finnish parliament approved the proposal in a vote of 188–8. On 16 May 2022, Marin underlined that they are always ready for dialogue with Turkey regarding NATO membership and that the problem will be resolved as soon as possible. Marin said she was surprised by Turkey's opposition to Finland's NATO membership. Finland and Sweden applied for NATO membership on 18 May 2022. On the same day, Turkey formally blocked the start of accession negotiations for Finland and Sweden. Finland and Sweden signed a trilateral memorandum with Turkey at the NATO summit held in Madrid on 28 June 2022, to address Turkey's security concerns. On the same day, Turkey agreed to support the accession bids of Finland and Sweden. She said her country did not want permanent NATO bases or nuclear weapons on its territory. During Marin's term as prime minister, Finland became a member of NATO on 4 April 2023.

=== Trendi photoshoot ===
In October 2020, an interview of Marin in the Finnish lifestyle magazine Trendi about her job and its expectations was illustrated by a photograph in which she wore a low-cut trouser suit with no shirt underneath. It generated much public debate when others accused her of demeaning her office, while others admired and defended her by accusing critics of sexism.

=== Spending ===
On 25 May 2021, Finnish media reported that Marin and her family were spending about €300 per month on groceries with public funds as a part of the prime minister's tax-free housing benefits in the official residence, Kesäranta. The legality of the customary arrangement that had been in place for decades was questioned since the rules on the residential benefits did not explicitly mention food provisions. However, previous prime ministers have not necessarily used residential benefits at all, and to this extent only one other social democratic prime minister. Later, the amount spent was found to be €850 per month, not the €300 first thought. Marin and her family had used around €14,363.20 on catering services in the form of breakfast provisions and cold evening meals in the prime minister's official residence between January 2020 and May 2021, equivalent to €845 per month. She stated that she did not know the limit, and she also did not know that residential benefits must be declared in taxes, which is routine in Finland for ordinary taxpayers. It turned out that civil servants in the Prime Minister's Office (VNK) handled the payments and Marin was not informed of the running costs of the residential perk. Marin's family have resided in the Kesäranta residence unusually much for a prime minister due to the restrictions and practicalities during the pandemic. Marin has since then repaid her family's meal expenses to the Finnish state. With the controversy over spending on groceries, Marin had to dispel speculation that public money had also been spent on her wedding, saying that she and her husband "paid for all our wedding expenses ourselves". The Office of the Chancellor of Justice cleared Marin of illegalities in its legal opinion in December 2022, and stated that she had the right to trust the civil servants whom the Office rebuked for unlawful actions.

=== Actions during the COVID-19 pandemic ===
In early December 2021, Marin visited a night club in Helsinki with some friends; earlier that day she had been in contact with Finland's foreign minister, who subsequently tested positive for COVID-19, thus exposing the prime minister to the infection. Marin was informed of this and advised by an Undersecretary of State that she did not need to self-isolate, as she was fully vaccinated. Later that night two text messages were sent to Marin's governmental work phone alerting her that she should self-isolate after all. However, Marin didn't receive the messages because she was only carrying her parliamentary work phone, even though according to the instructions of the Government, reachability is precisely the duty of the minister; the governmental work phone has different security restrictions for its usage. Apparently there was a failure to check whether she had received the update, and therefore no messages to her parliamentary phone. The phone camera video of Marin in the night club published by the magazine that broke the story, Seiska, shows Marin on the dance floor checking her smartwatch for messages.

According to Marin, she had been told that going out in public was permitted due to her having been fully vaccinated. The next day she received information that this was not the case, so she explained missing the updated advice and apologised for her poor judgment on Facebook. Two complaints about Marin's behaviour were filed to the Chancellor of Justice, who subsequently exonerated her. Prominent members of the Centre Party, a partner in Marin's five-party coalition government, alleged that Marin had lied to them by altering her explanations of the events; however, they did not provide evidence of where this occurred.

=== Private party videos ===
In August 2022, leaked videos of Marin partying and dancing in an apartment in Helsinki became public, and went viral. In response to what Marin called "serious allegations in the public domain" regarding drug use, she voluntarily took a drug test on 19 August "for [her] own legal protection [and] to clear up any doubts" and tested negative. There was further controversy after a picture two of Marin's friends had taken in bathing room by themselves during a party in the prime minister's official residence was posted in their social media post showing them kissing topless with a "Finland" text covering their breasts. Marin apologised for the picture and called it "not appropriate".

=== Sámi rights legislation ===
In October 2022, Marin apologised to the Indigenous Sámi people for the delays in the reform of the Sámi human rights legislation. The legislation has been in the making for three parliamentary terms without success. In Marin's cabinet, the law has been repeatedly blocked by the Centre Party. Marin stated that she would bring the legislation for a parliamentary vote even without Centre Party support. In November, ministers voted 11–3 to send the legislation to the Finnish Parliament. On 24 February 2023, the constitutional law committee voted 9–7 to suspend work on the bill, preventing the legislation from being passed before the 2023 Finnish parliamentary election. In the committee vote, the Centre Party voted with the conservative opposition to block the Sámi Parliament Act. In an interview on Ykkösaamu, Marin expressed her disappointment in the bill's failure.

=== 2023 election ===
On 2 April 2023, Marin conceded defeat to her center-right rivals, the National Coalition, led by Petteri Orpo, as her party came in third in the 2023 Finnish parliamentary election, behind Orpo's NCP and the nationalists Finns, led by Riikka Purra. Despite her party falling to third place, the SDP still managed to pick up three seats in the election and increased its overall vote share. Marin was re-elected with a Pirkanmaa district record of 35,623 votes.

== Post–premiership (2023–present) ==
On 5 April 2023, Marin announced that she would resign as the leader of the Social Democratic Party at the next party congress in the autumn. She was succeeded by Antti Lindtman on 1 September 2023.

In June 2023, Marin founded a company MA/PI Oy. In addition to public speaking, the company's industries include publishing and consulting. In July, Marin was listed as a speaker on the lists of the US-based Harry Walker Agency, which arranges "keynote and motivational speakers" for international events.

In August 2023, Marin asked Jutta Urpilainen to be Social Democratic Party's candidate for the 2024 presidential election of Finland.

On 7 September 2023, Marin announced her intention to resign as an MP and take up a position as a strategic advisor at the Tony Blair Institute for Global Change. On 12 September 2023 her application for resignation from the Finnish Parliament was approved.

On 28 September 2023, it was reported that she had signed with talent agency Range Media Partners for film, TV, audio and brand collaborations.

In January 2024, Marin started working in a new steering committee International Task Force on Security and Euro-Atlantic Integration of Ukraine. According to a statement released by the Ukrainian president's office, the steering committee's primary objective is to develop a strategy for Ukraine's closer engagement with the Euro-Atlantic security area. The group is led by its founders Andriy Yermak, Chief of Staff of the president of Ukraine and former Nato Secretary-General Anders Fogh Rasmussen. In addition to them, 15 former European and North American heads of state, diplomats and officers (including Boris Johnson and Hillary Clinton) are members of the group.

Marin appeared on 18 August 2026 as one of the speakers together with former first minister of Scotland Nicola Sturgeon at the Edinburgh International Book Festival. The event was entitled "How to lead a country".

== Personal life ==
Marin describes herself as coming from a "rainbow family", as she was raised by two female parents.

Marin has a daughter born in 2018 with her former partner, TPV football player Markus Räikkönen. In August 2020, Marin and Räikkönen, who works in communications, married at the prime minister's official residence, Kesäranta. Their permanent residence was in the Kaleva district of Tampere, but during the COVID-19 pandemic, they resided at Kesäranta. The couple filed for divorce in May 2023, after 19 years together.

Marin is a vegetarian.

== Awards and reception ==
Marin was on the list of the BBC's 100 Women announced on 23 November 2020. On 9 December 2020, she was selected by Forbes to rank 85th on the list of The World's 100 Most Powerful Women. In 2020 she became a Young Global Leader of the World Economic Forum. Marin was selected for the cover of Time magazine's "Time100 Next" theme issue, which showcases one hundred influential leaders from around the world. In the December 2022 Financial Times selected Marin on the 25 most influential women list.

The French magazine Marie Claire ranked Marin as one of the most influential women in its "1st Annual Power List". The German newspaper Bild has praised Marin as the "coolest politician in the world". In 2022, The Australian Broadcasting Corporation said Marin was an icon of progressive leadership.

Domestically, Marin received the Grand Cross of the Order of the White Rose of Finland. As Finland's prime minister Marin was awarded a Doctor of Humane Letters, honoris causa at New York University.

On 22 October 2024, she was awarded Sweden's 'Commander Grand Cross of the Royal Order of the Polar Star' (KmstkNO).

On 22 January 2026, Zelenskyy awarded the former prime minister of Finland, Sanna Marin, an honorary medal. Marin received the Order of Princess Olga, 1st Class, as recognition from the Ukrainian state.

== Notes ==
Party political offices
Preceded by Antti Rinne	Leader of the Social Democratic Party; 2020–2023	Succeeded by Antti Lindtman
Political offices
Preceded by Anu Vehviläinen	Minister of Transport and Communications; 2019	Succeeded by Timo Harakka
Preceded by Antti Rinne	Prime Minister of Finland; 2019–2023	Succeeded by Petteri Orpo
Diplomatic posts
Preceded by Antti Rinne	Presidency of the Council of the European Union; 10 December 2019 – 1 January 2020	Succeeded by Andrej Plenković
