= Kesäranta =

Kesäranta Villa Bjälbo
- Kesäranta is the residence of the Prime Minister of Finland.

- Location within Helsinki (mainland)

General information
- Status: In use
- Type: Official residence
- Location: Kesärannantie 1; 00250 Helsinki, Helsinki, Finland
- Coordinates: 60.184544°N 24.906152°E
- Current tenants: Prime Minister of Finland
- Completed: 1873
- Inaugurated: 1904
- Owner: Finnish Government

Technical details
- Floor count: 2

Website
- valtioneuvosto.fi/en

Kesäranta (lit. 'summer shore', Swedish: Villa Bjälbo) is the official residence of the Prime Minister of Finland, located in Helsinki in the neighborhood of Meilahti, overlooking Seurasaarenselkä.

The residence is owned by the Finnish Government through Senate Properties. The Meilahti neighborhood where Kesäranta is located is a zone of prohibited airspace.

== History ==
=== Pre-government ownership ===
Kesäranta was built in 1873 as the summer villa of architect Frans Ludvig Calonius, under the Swedish name, Bjälbo. At the time of its construction, Meilahti lay outside the boundaries of Helsinki. Initially, Kesäranta was a two-storey wooden villa, but in 1887, after it was acquired by Carl Robert Ignatius, a cashier at the Bank of Finland, the building was altered to the designs of Elia Heikel, who added a 20-metre tower and a bayside veranda to the building.

=== Finland's Governor-General's residence ===
In 1904, Kesäranta was purchased by the State to serve as the summer residence of the Governor-General of Finland. Architect Jac Ahrenberg was commissioned to make the necessary changes to the building and its furnishings. A new kitchen wing was attached to the main building and a glazed veranda was built on to the side of the building facing the sea. The villa served as the summer residence of Governor-Generals Obolenski, Gerhard, Boeckmann, and Seyn.

=== Kesäranta during Finnish independence ===
Following Finland's declaration of its independence in 1917 and the Finnish Civil War in 1918, the German general Rüdiger von der Goltz lived in Kesäranta briefly. Carl Gustaf Emil Mannerheim also used Kesäranta as an occasional residence during his term as Regent, or Protector of State, from 1918 to 1919.

Since 1919, Kesäranta has served as the Prime Minister's official residence.

In the summertime, the government holds its informal evening sessions at Kesäranta. These take place on Wednesday evenings and date back to the 1930s, when Prime Minister Aimo Cajander adopted the practice of inviting ministers to Kesäranta to discuss and prepare matters to be handled in the Government plenary session on Thursday.

A thorough renovation of the main building took place first in the 1950s and again in the 1980s. The main building was restored to look as it did in the beginning of the century, including the rebuilding of the tower and the veranda, which had been removed in the 1950s. The courtyard of Kesäranta includes a seaside sauna, a maintenance building, a guard's house, a pavilion, a jetty, and a tennis court.

In 2017, a blue sign reading "100" was installed on the yard of Kesäranta to commemorate the centennial year of Finnish independence.

== Prime ministers who have resided in Kesäranta ==
- Aimo Cajander
- Jukka Rangell
- Edwin Linkomies
- Urho Kekkonen
- Mauno Koivisto
- Esko Aho
- Paavo Lipponen
- Matti Vanhanen
- Mari Kiviniemi
- Sanna Marin
- Petteri Orpo

== Gallery ==
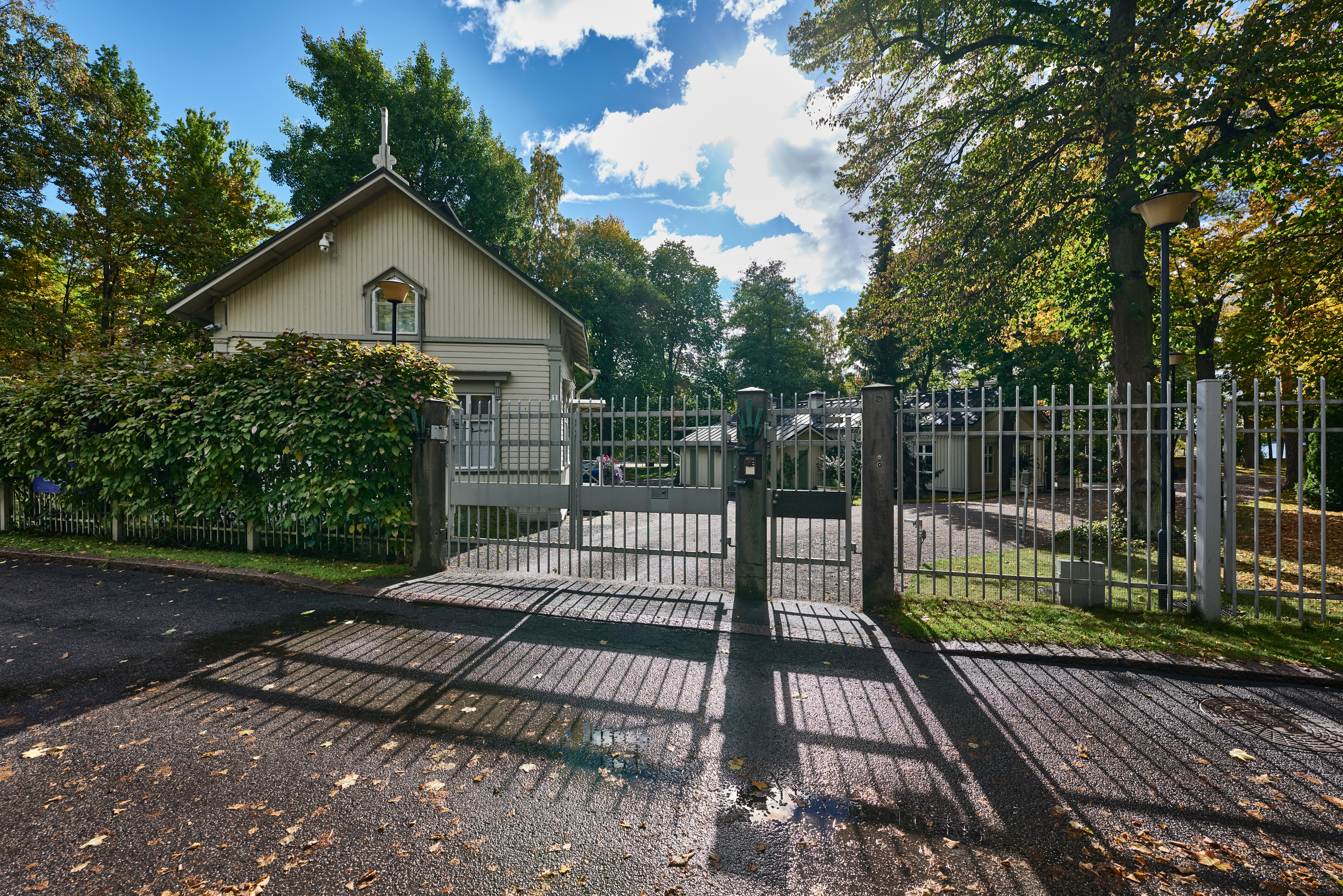
Gateway to Kesäranta

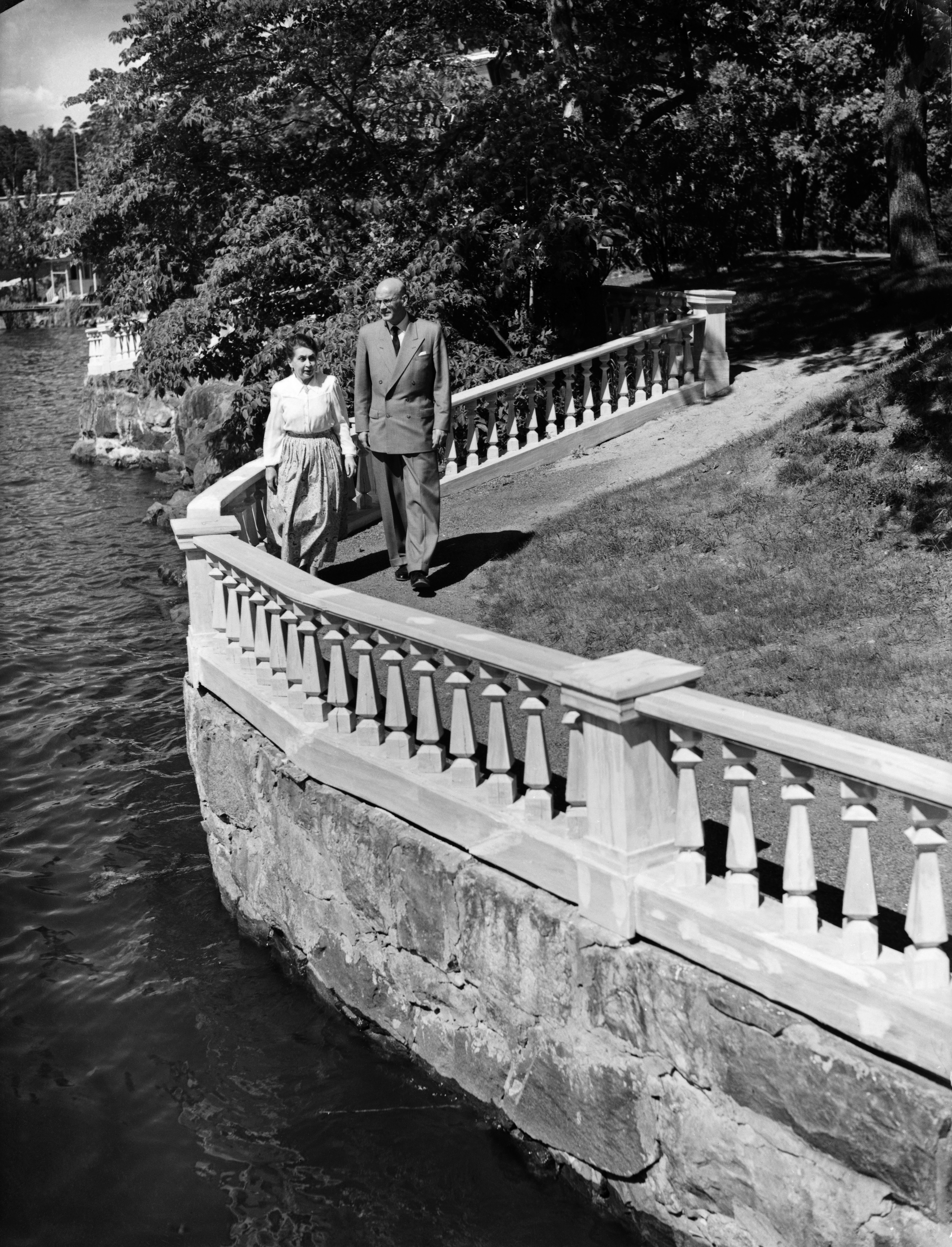
Urho Kekkonen with his wife Sylvi Kekkonen together in Kesäranta 1952

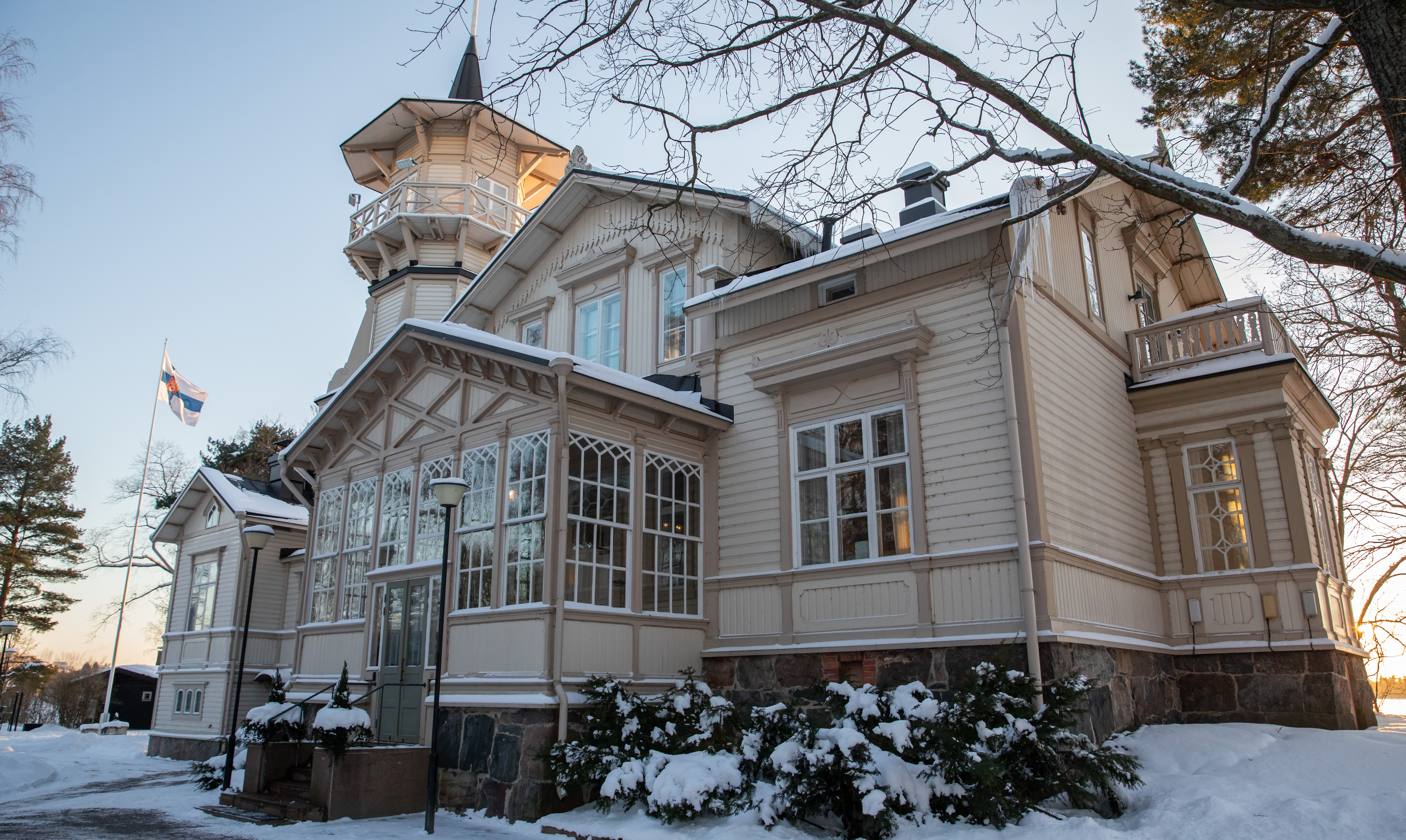
Kesäranta's main entrance

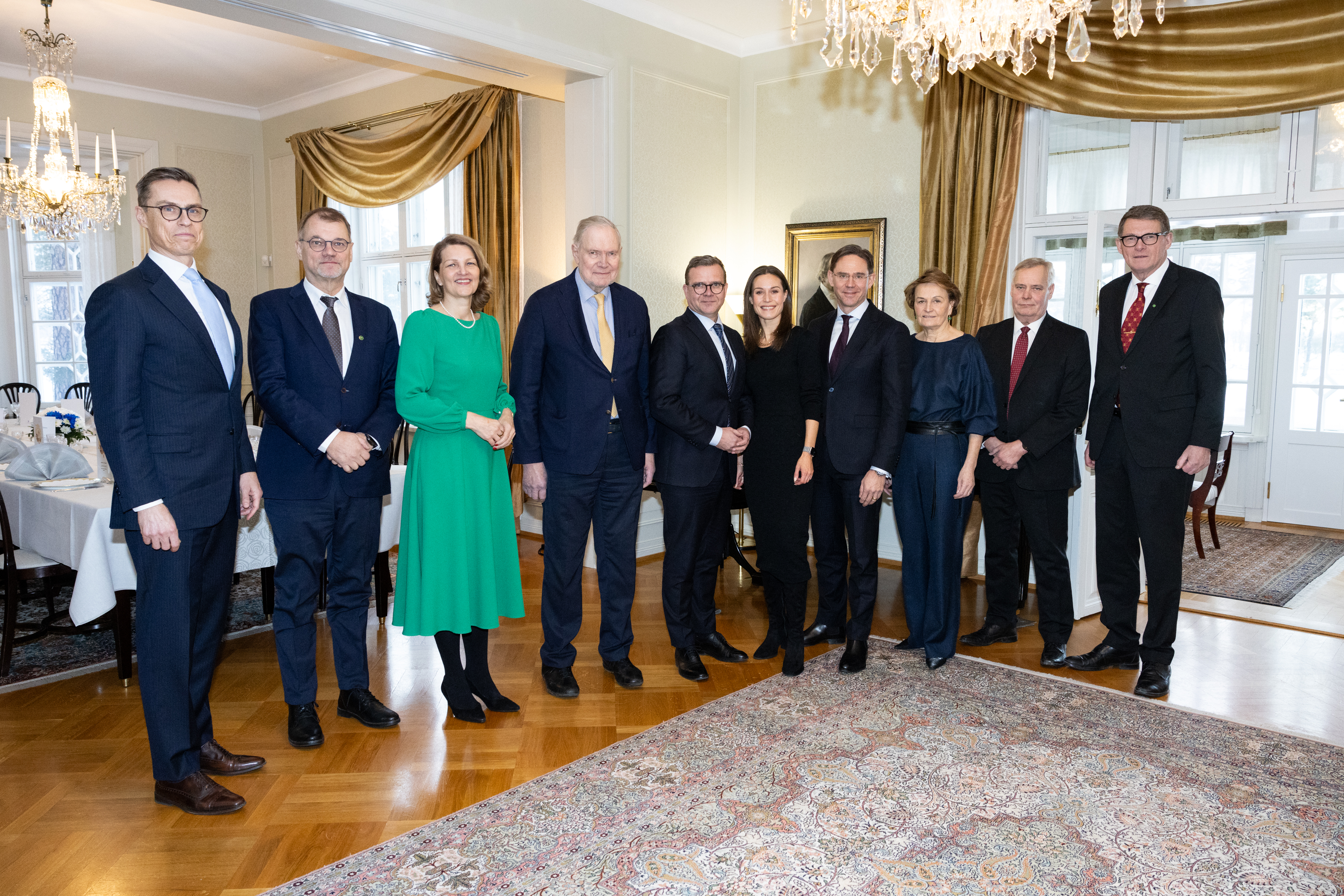
Finnish prime ministers from different eras

Kesäranta's Backyard

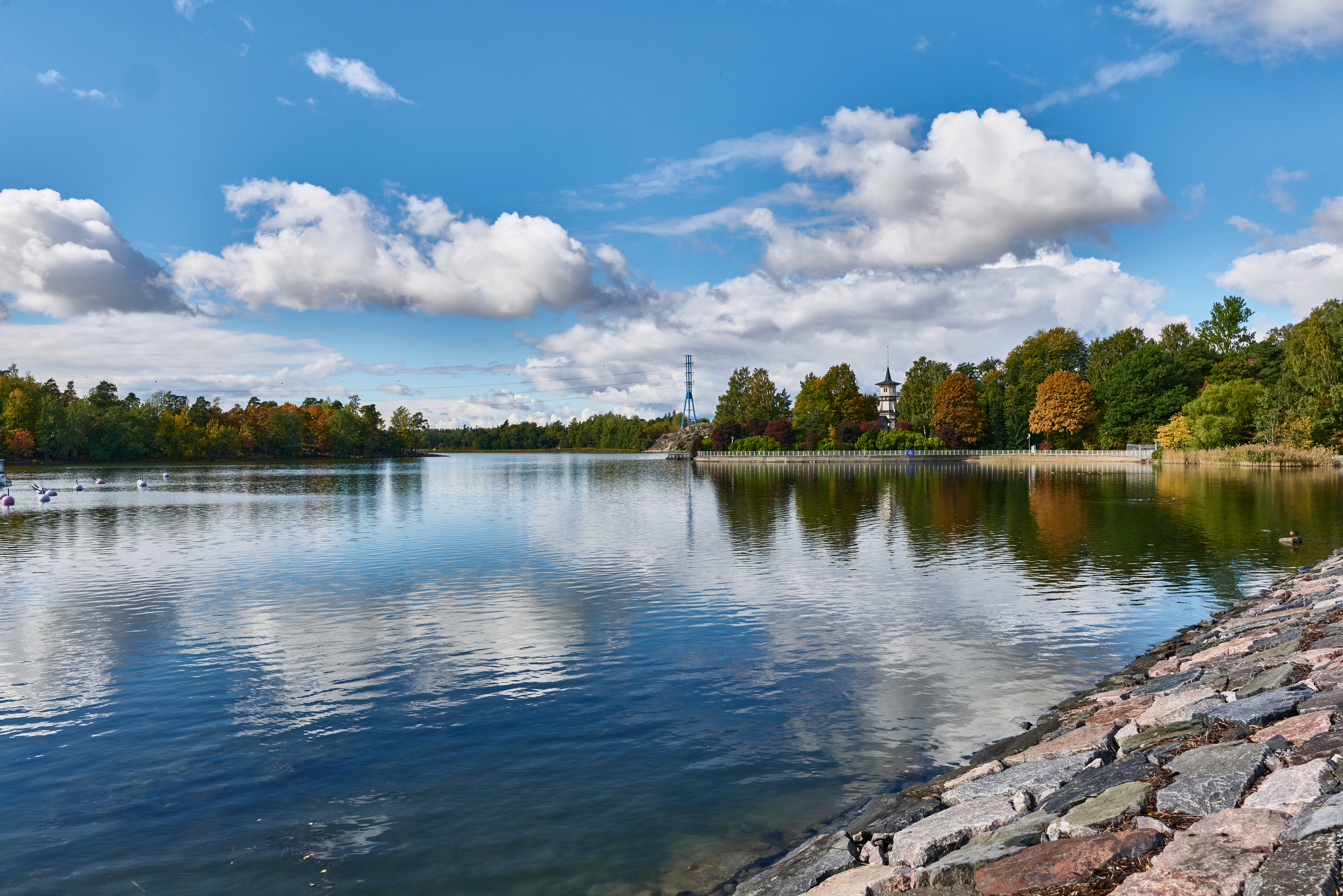
Waterfront of kesäranta

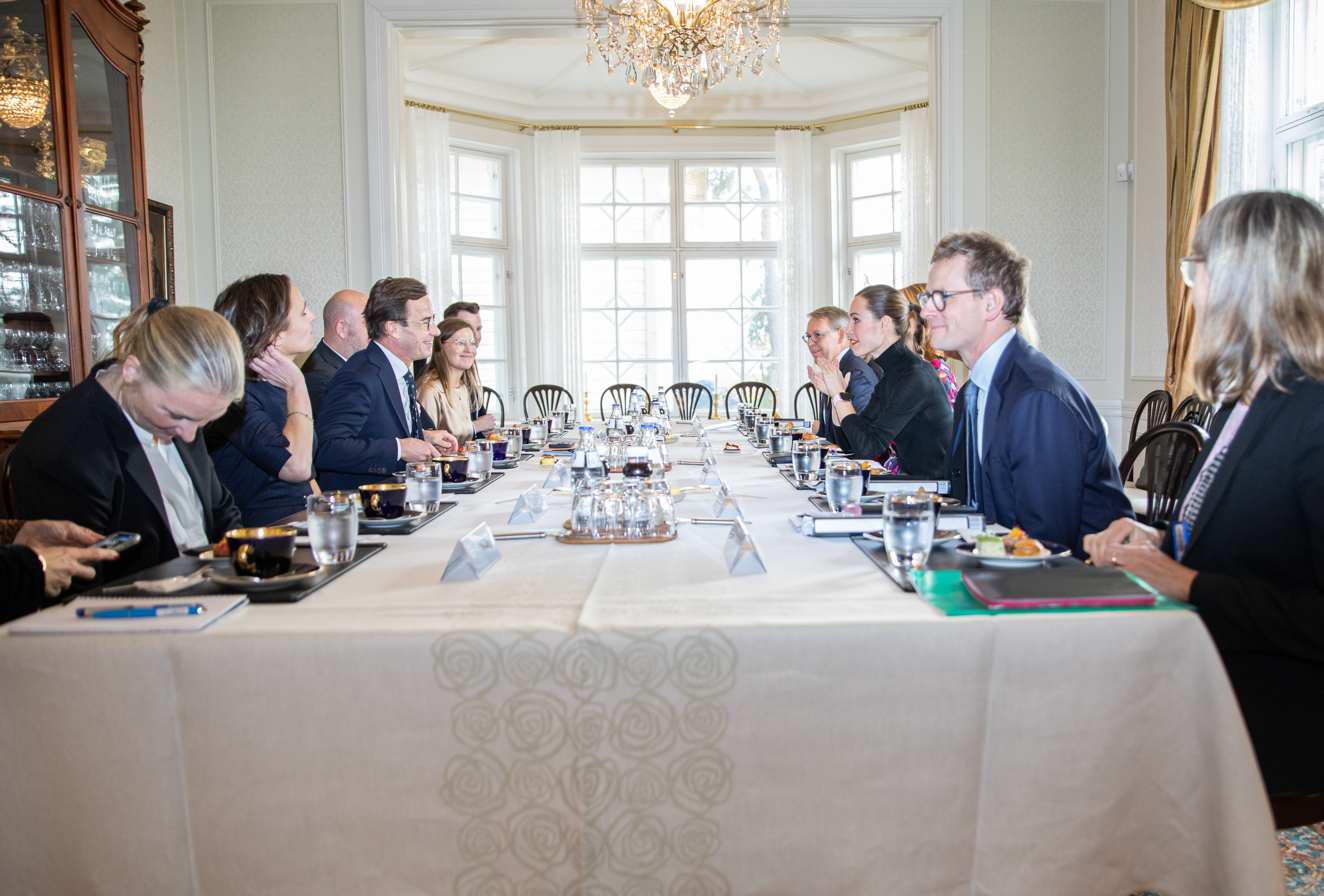
Prime Minister of Finland Sanna Marin and Prime Minister of Sweden Ulf Kristersson held negotiations in Kesäranta 2022

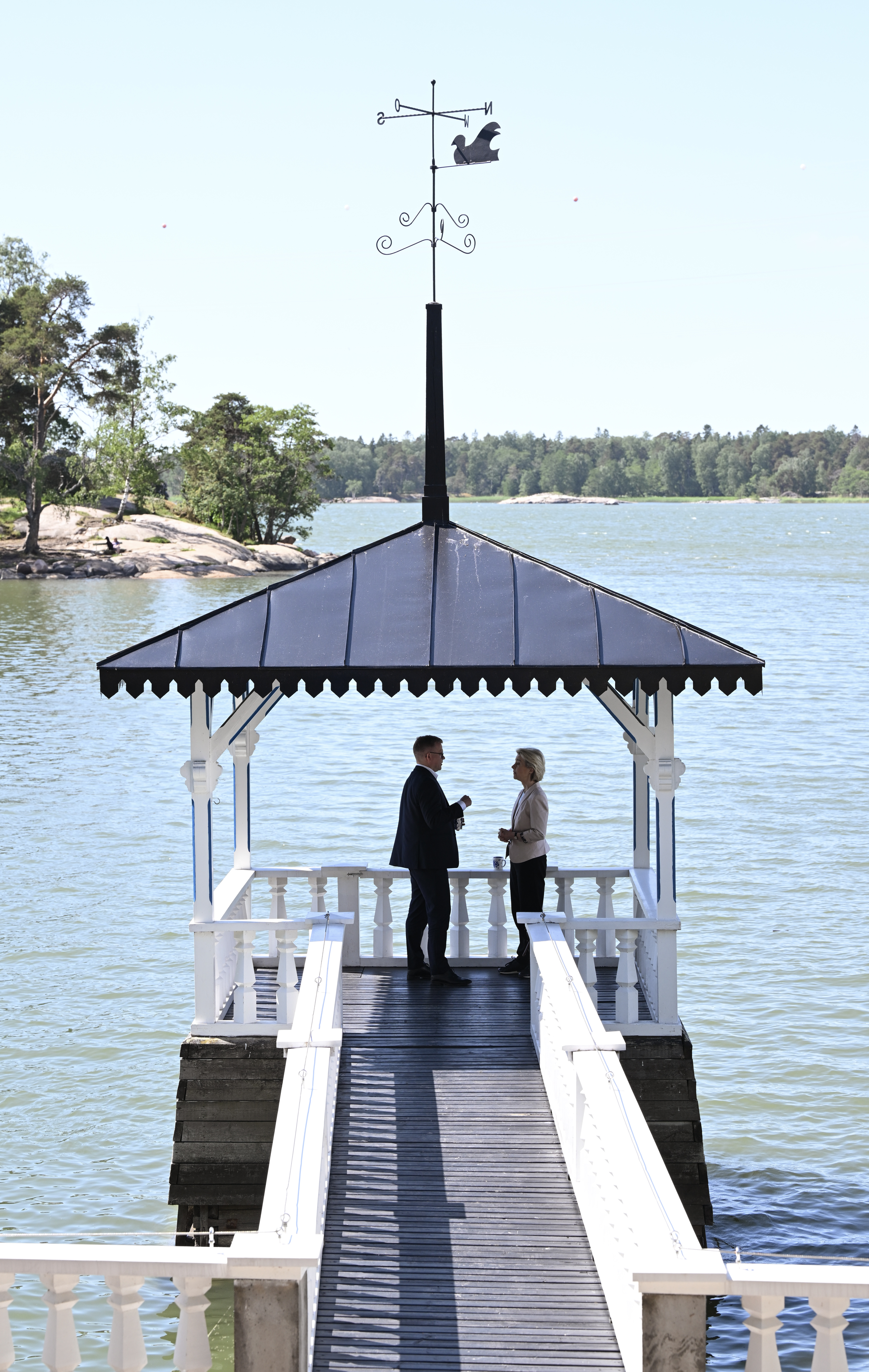
Negotiations between President of the European Commission Ursula von der Leyen and Prime Minister of Finland Petteri Orpo

== See also ==
- Kultaranta
- Mäntyniemi
- Tamminiemi
- Prime Minister of Finland
- Finnish Government
- Politics of Finland
