= Antti Lindtman =

Finnish politician (born 1982)

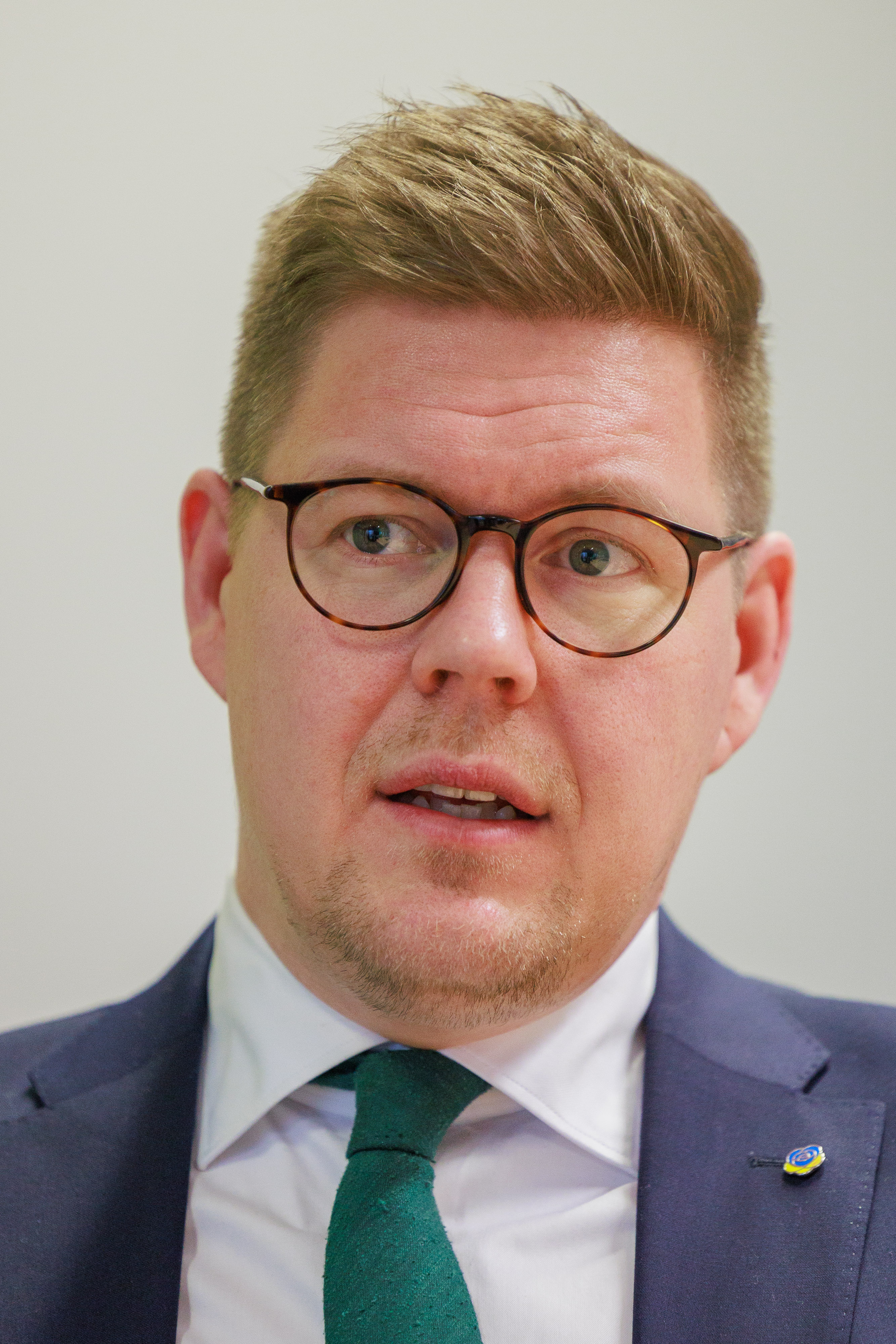
- Antti Lindtman in 2023

Leader of the Social Democratic Party
- Incumbent
- Assumed office 1 September 2023
- Preceded by: Sanna Marin

Member of the Parliament of Finland
- Incumbent
- Assumed office 17 April 2011
- Constituency: Uusimaa

Personal details
- Born: Antti Ilmari Lindtman; 11 August 1982 (age 44) Vantaa, Finland
- Party: Social Democratic
- Spouse: Kaija Helena Stormbom (m. 2011)
- Children: 1
- Education: University of Helsinki (2013–2016)
- Website: https://anttilindtman.fi/

Antti Ilmari Lindtman (born 11 August 1982) is a Finnish politician who has served as leader of the Social Democratic Party (SDP) since September 2023. He was the chairman of the city council of Vantaa from 2009 to 2023 and has been a member of the Parliament of Finland for Uusimaa since April 2011. In April 2015, he was elected as the chairman of the Social Democratic Parliamentary Group.

== Political career ==
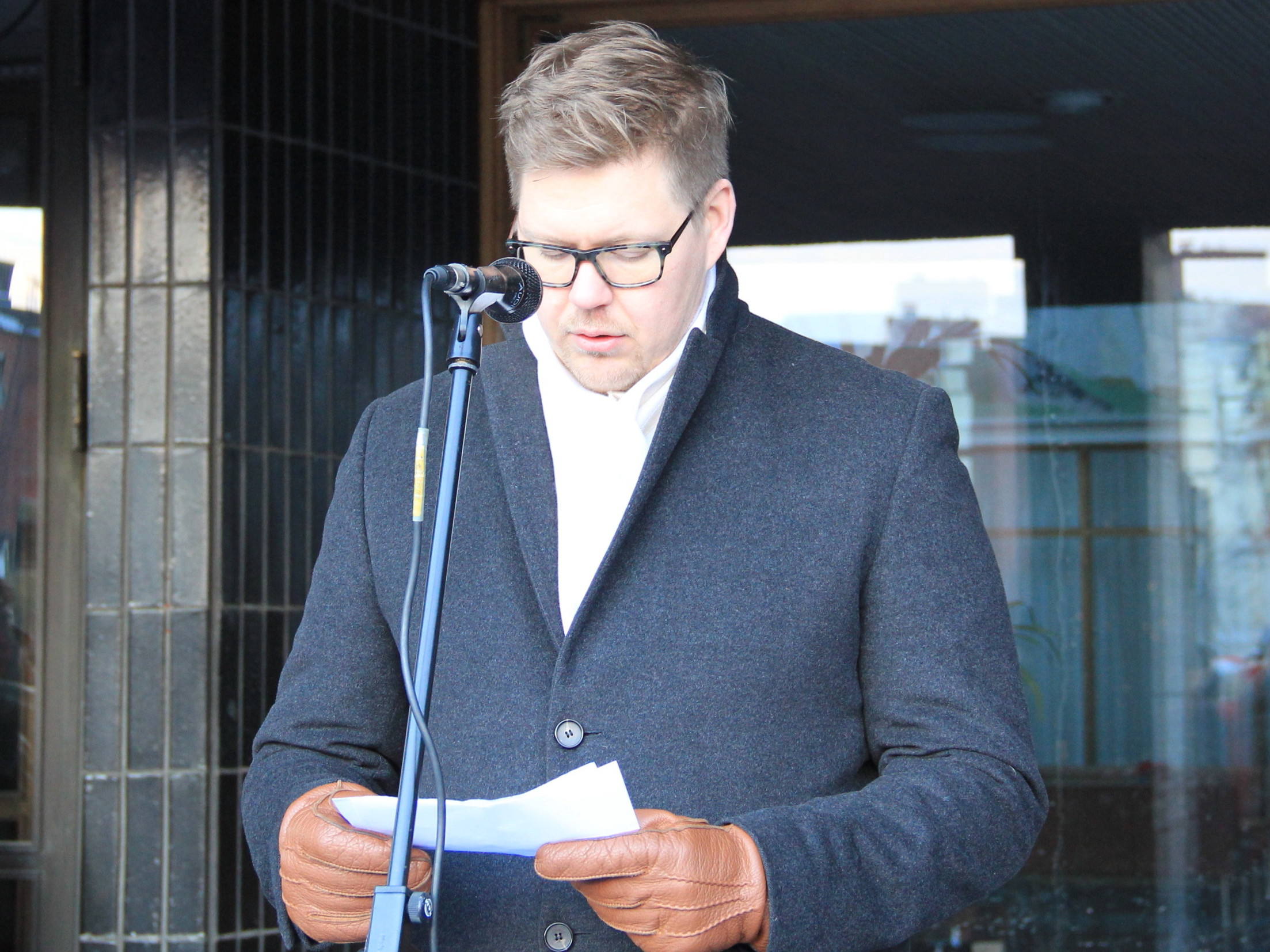
Lindtman reading the declaration of Christmas Peace in 2018 as Chairman of the Vantaa City Council

Lindtmann was first elected to the Finnish parliament at the 2011 election for Uusimaa. He has been re-elected since. Lindtman came out in support of the legislative reforms that arose from the Oulu child sexual exploitation scandal, where adult men that had come to Finland to seek asylum were discovered to have been grooming and subsequently sexually abusing and raping girls under the age of 15.

Lindtman came in second in a vote to replace Social Democratic Party’s leader Antti Rinne in December 2019 after his resignation, narrowly losing to Transportation Minister Sanna Marin. Following the resignation of Marin after the 2023 election, Lindtman was elected to replace her as Social Democratic leader at a party meeting in Jyväskylä on 1 September 2023.

== Controversies ==
In October 2016, it was found out that Lindtman had handed secret lists to the speaker and deputy speakers of the Parliament of Finland in which he had suggested which MPs from the SDP should get turns to speak in plenary sessions. The speakers had been under the impression that the lists were the result of an internal agreement of the parliamentary group, whereas Lindtman had made the decision alone and without informing anyone else. The practice had continued for at least a year. The revelation led to heavy criticism of Lindtman's actions by the members of the parliamentary group, after which Lindtman apologized for his actions.

In September 2023, when Lindtman got elected chair of the SDP, a scandal broke out due to him in his adolescent years, posing near four other naked young adults, nude, wearing a pointed hat in the style of a christmas elf, covered by a balaclava and with an airsoft gun in hand, while two others were doing a Nazi salute in the same picture. Because of this, Lindtman was accused of being a Nazi. He responded by stating that the image had been taken during his time in a high school film group by the name of "Team Paha" (in English: Team Bad) in a Pikkujoulu party while they were messing around and firmly denied the allegation of being a neo-Nazi.
