= Prime Minister of Finland =

Head of government

Prime Minister of Republic of Finland
- Suomen pääministeri (Finnish); Finlands statsminister (Swedish)
- Logo used by the Prime Minister’s Office

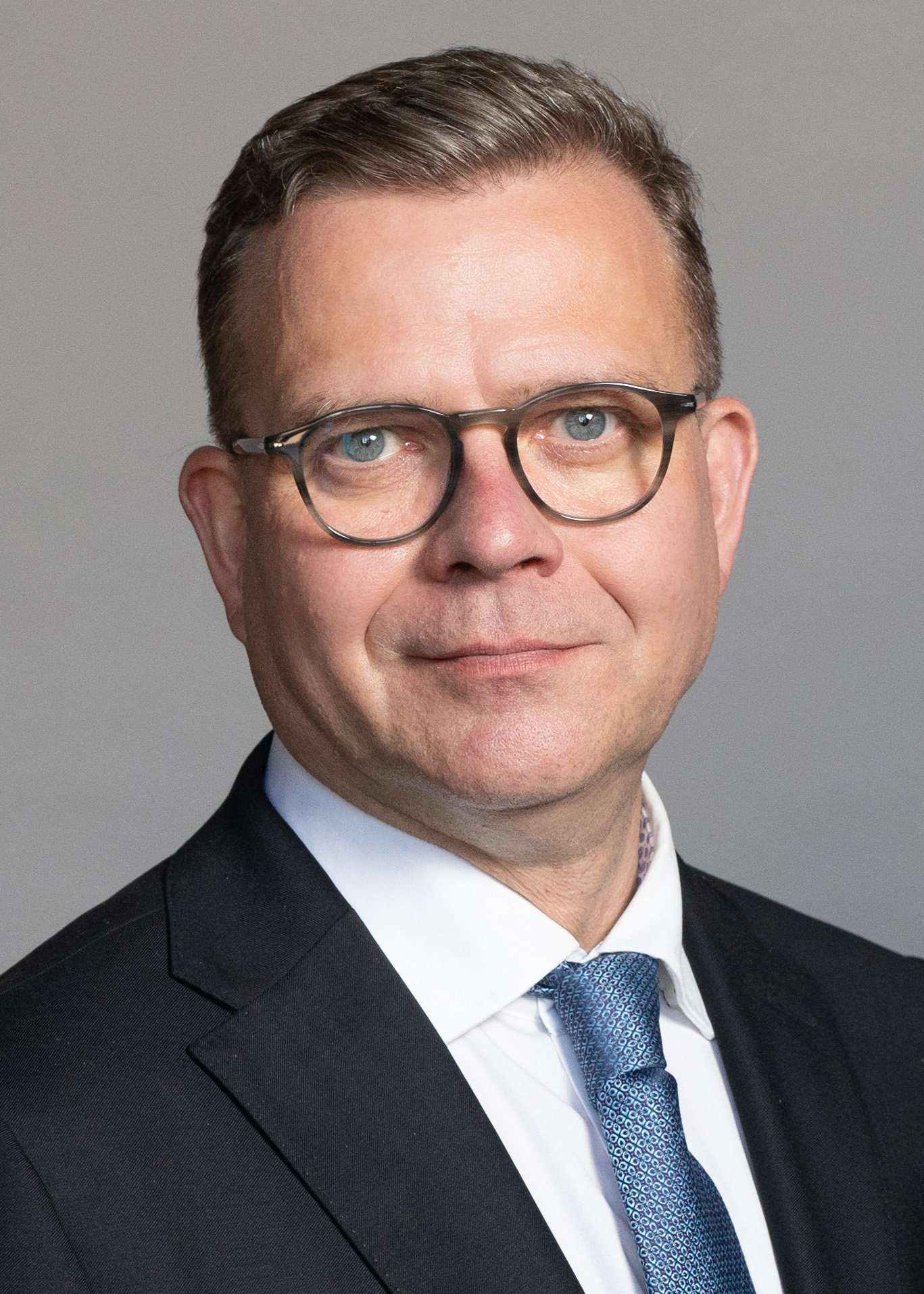
- Incumbent; Petteri Orpo since 20 June 2023
- Executive branch of the Finnish Government; Prime Minister's Office
- Style: Prime Minister (informal); His Excellency (diplomatic)
- Type: Head of government
- Member of: Cabinet of Finland; European Council
- Residence: Kesäranta
- Appointer: President
- Term length: Four years, renewable
- Precursor: Vice-Chairman of the Economic Division of the Senate of Finland
- Formation: 27 November 1917; 108 years ago
- First holder: Pehr Evind Svinhufvud
- Salary: €202,350 annually
- Website: valtioneuvosto.fi/en/ministers/-/min/orpo/prime-minister

The prime minister of Finland (Finnish: Suomen pääministeri, literally "head minister"; Swedish: Finlands statsminister, literally "state minister") is the leader of the Finnish Government. The prime minister and their cabinet exercise executive authority in the state. The prime minister is formally ranked third in the protocol after the president of Finland and the speaker of the Parliament but is in practice the most powerful office-holder. Finland's first prime minister, Pehr Evind Svinhufvud (also later the 3rd president of Finland), was appointed on 27 November 1917, just a few days before the country declared its independence.

The incumbent prime minister is Petteri Orpo of the National Coalition Party. Orpo was sworn in on 20 June 2023.

== History ==
In 1918, the Senate of Finland was transformed into the Government of Finland, and the position of vice-chairman of the Economic Division was transformed into that of the prime minister. Kesäranta, located in the westerly Meilahti subdivision of Helsinki, has been the official residence of the prime minister of Finland since 1919.

Since its independence in 1917, Finland has had 72 cabinets. The longest lasting have been the two cabinets of prime minister Paavo Lipponen (Lipponen I and Lipponen II), both lasting the entire parliamentary term, or 1,464 days.

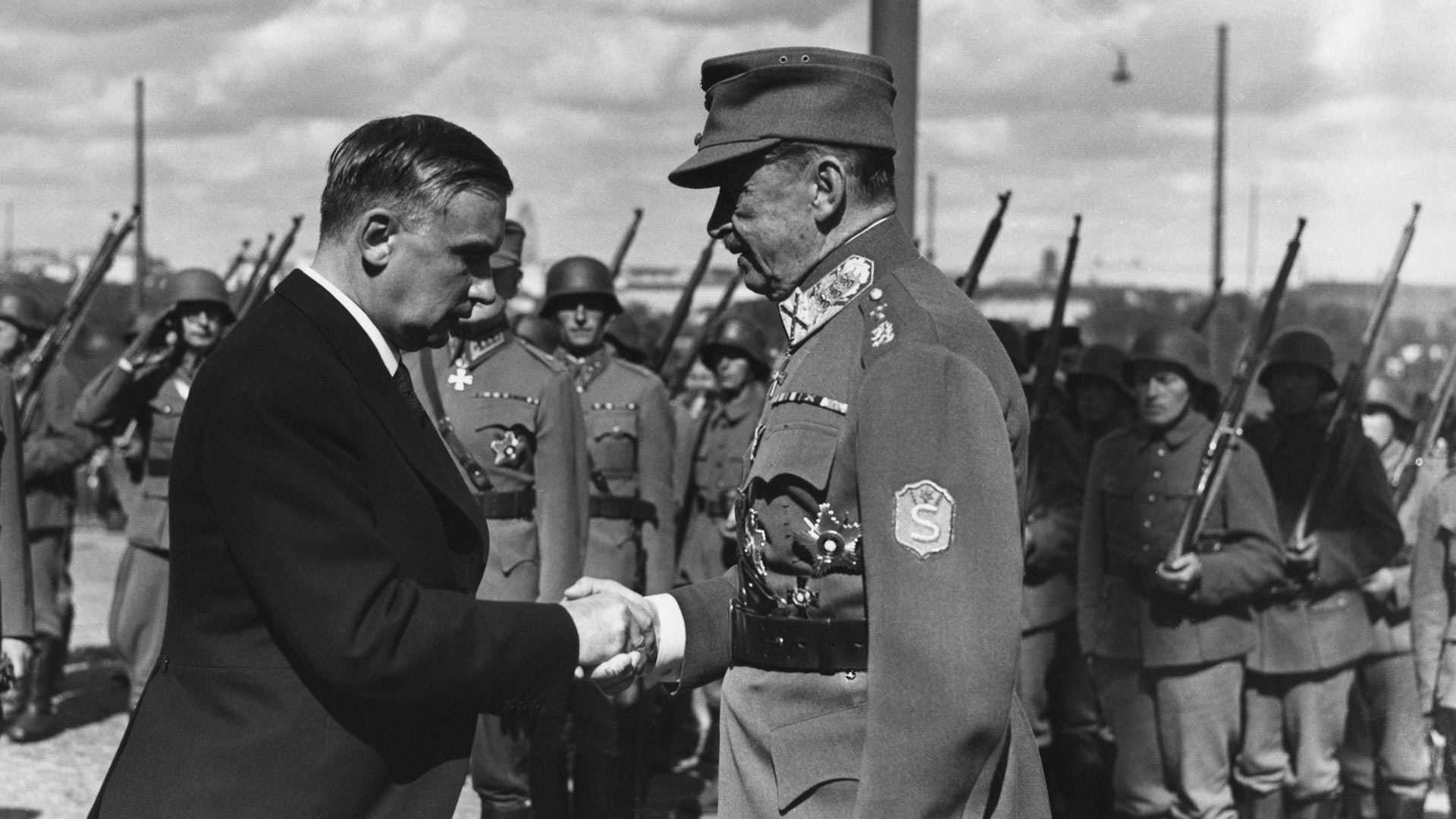
Prime Minister Edwin Linkomies and Carl Gustaf Emil Mannerheim in 1943

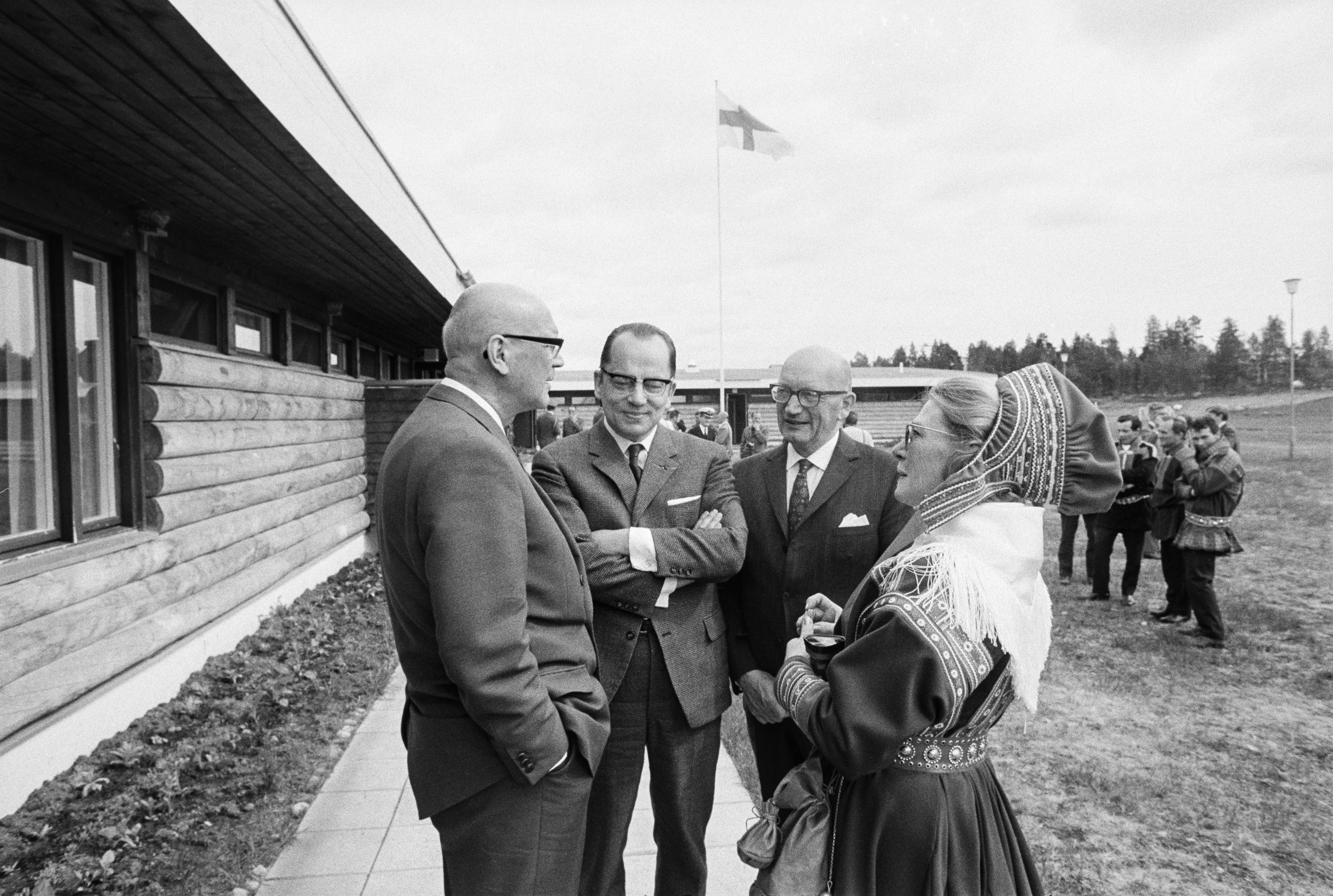
President Kekkonen with Ahti Karjalainen and Martti Miettunen in Lapland 1969.

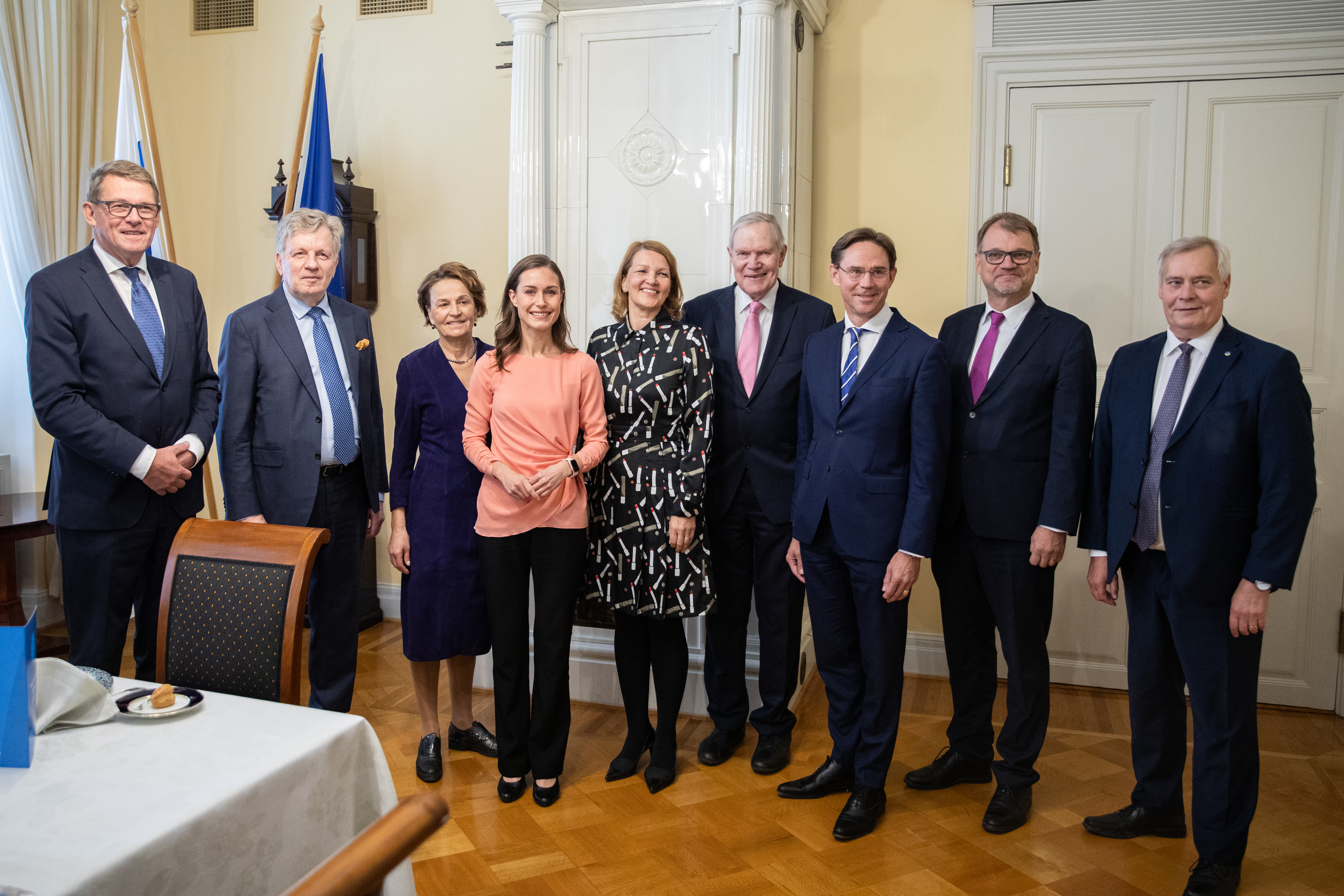
Celebratory lunch of Finland's Prime Ministers on 27 September 2022

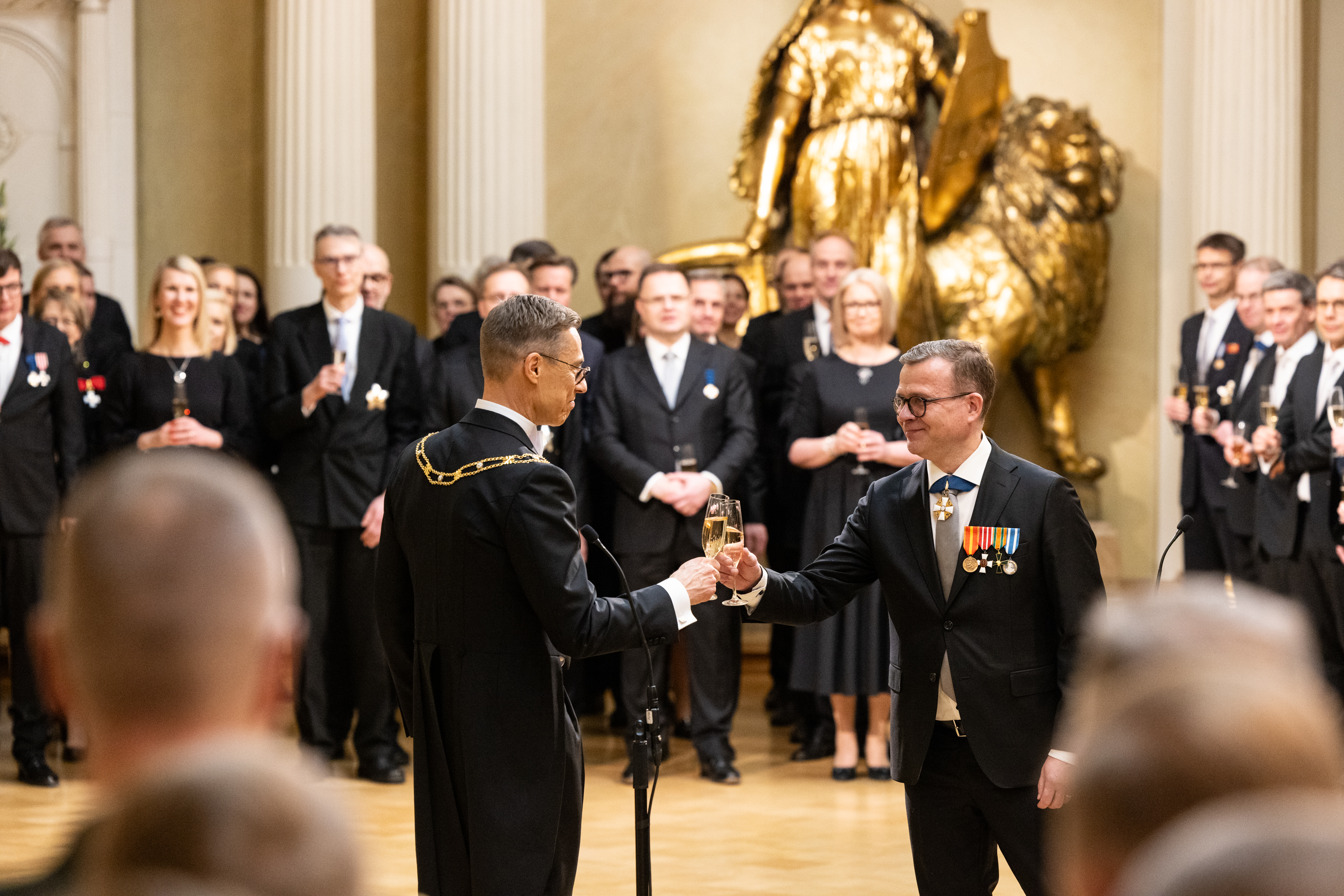
President Stubb with Prime Minister Petteri Orpo in 2024

Kesäranta, the official residence of the Prime Minister of Finland, in Meilahti, Helsinki

== Appointment ==
The prime minister's appointment follows the parliamentary election, which are scheduled to be held once every four years.

Under the provisions of the Constitution of Finland, the president nominates a prime minister after the parties in the parliament have negotiated the distribution of seats in the new cabinet and the government's programme. The parliament must ratify the nominated prime minister with an absolute majority in a confidence vote without other candidates. If the nominee doesn't receive sufficient support, a new round of negotiations and a second nomination by the President follows. If the second nominee also fails to gain an absolute majority, a third vote is held, in which any member of parliament can nominate a candidate; in this round a plurality is sufficient for election.

The above procedure was first used to elect Anneli Jäätteenmäki to the premiership in 2003. Previously it was assumed that the president would nominate the candidate who, in a third round of voting, would have gained a relative majority, this usually being the leader of the party with the largest seat share in parliament. Before the 2000 constitution was enacted, full formal powers to appoint the prime minister and the rest of the government had been the privilege of the president, who was free to diverge from parliamentary principles, although the ministers appointed had to have the confidence of the parliament.

Formally, the prime minister nominates the remaining members of the government, who are then, with the consent of Parliament, appointed by the president. In practice, the seats are divided between parties during the negotiations to form the government, so that the prime minister candidate must take into account the opinions of the participating parties and cannot nominate or remove whoever they wish.

== Salary and benefits ==
The prime minister's salary is €12,173 per month. In addition, the prime minister receives half of the parliamentary salary. The full parliamentary salary is, as of 1 May 2011, at least €6,335 a month, so the Finnish prime minister receives at least €14,842 per month in total. The salary is subject to income tax.

The prime minister is entitled to 30 vacation days during each calendar year. The maintenance, staff and services of Kesäranta, the official residence, are paid for by the government. The prime minister's benefits do not include free meals or meal allowance.

The prime minister has transportation and security services at their disposal at all times.

== See also ==
- Deputy Prime Minister of Finland
- Finnish Government
