= Sipilä cabinet =

74th government of Finland

Sipilä's Cabinet
- 74th Cabinet of Finland

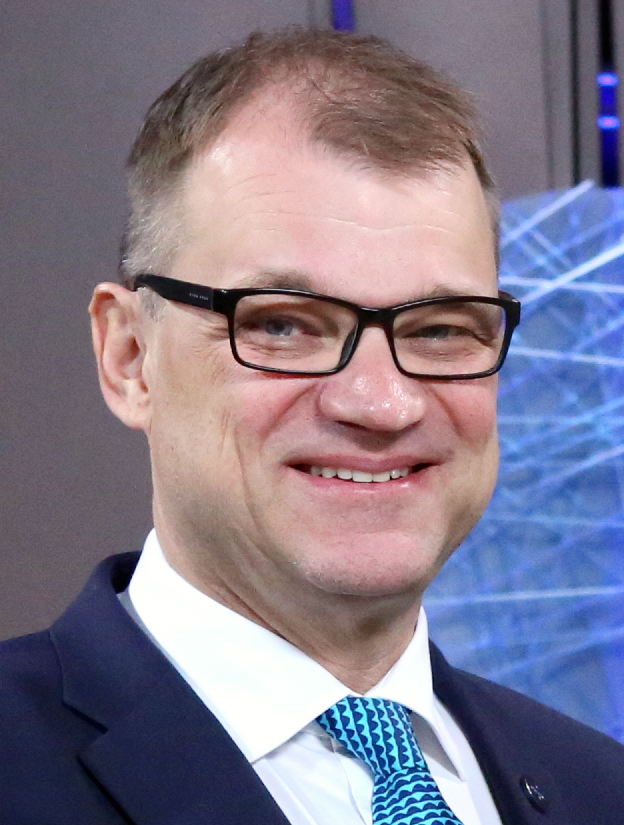
- Date formed: 29 May 2015
- Date dissolved: 8 March 2019 (continued on caretaker basis until 6 June 2019)

People and organisations
- Head of state: Sauli Niinistö
- Head of government: Juha Sipilä
- No. of ministers: 14 (2015–2017); 17 (2017–2019)
- Member parties: Since 13 June 2017; Centre Party; National Coalition Party; Finns Party (2015–2017); Blue Reform (2017–2019)
- Status in legislature: Majority government (coalition)

History
- Election: 2015 parliamentary election
- Budget: €55,774 billion (2018)
- Predecessor: Stubb Cabinet
- Successor: Rinne Cabinet

Finnish prime minister Juha Sipilä in 2017

The cabinet of Juha Sipilä was the 74th government of Finland, from 2015 to 2019. It was formed following the parliamentary election of 2015 and formally appointed by President Sauli Niinistö on 29 May 2015. From June 2017, the cabinet consisted of a coalition formed by the Centre Party, Blue Reform and the National Coalition Party. The cabinet's Prime Minister was Juha Sipilä.

Following the parliamentary election of 2015 and cabinet discussions, a coalition government consisting of the three largest centre-right parties – the Centre Party, the National Coalition Party, and the Finns Party – was formed. Centre returned to lead the government after four years in opposition. This was the first time that a right-wing populist party, namely the Finns Party, had participated in a Finnish government and the first time since 1979 that the Swedish People's Party was left out. The center-right coalition had a total of 124 seats (62%) in the 200-seat parliament when it started. On 22 June 2016, Finns Party MP Maria Tolppanen joined the Social Democratic Party, which decreased the government's share to 123 seats.

As a result of the 2017 Finns Party leadership election, Jussi Halla-aho became the party's leader. On 12 June 2017, Sipilä and Orpo declared that they did not see grounds for continued co-operation with the Finns Party, effectively announcing the imminent dissolution of the Sipilä Cabinet. They cited disagreements in the parties' value bases, as well as Halla-aho's newfound leadership of his party from Brussels as obstacles for maintaining the three-party coalition. On the following day, 13 June 2017, a group split from the Finns Party forming a new parliamentary group called Blue Reform (initially New Alternative), and declared a willingness to continue in the cabinet. As a result, Blue Reform took the Finns Party's place in the cabinet and the cabinet continued with the same ministers as before, with the Finns Party entering opposition. After the split, the total number of seats held by the government changed a few times due to the shifting allegiance of some Finns Party MPs, but ultimately was settled to 106 seats, of which one is the speaker of the parliament, and as a result is unable to vote.

The Sipilä cabinet was the most male-dominated government in contemporary Finnish history. It consisted of 17 ministers, of which twelve were men and five women.

On 8 March 2019 it was announced that Sipilä had asked permission from President of Finland Sauli Niinistö to dissolve the cabinet and that Niinistö had accepted. The Cabinet was dissolved that day but was requested to continue on a caretaker basis until a new government was formed.

== Ministers ==
At the start of its tenure, there were a total of 14 ministers in Sipilä's cabinet: six ministers from the Centre Party and four ministers each from the National Coalition Party and the Finns Party. In April 2017, following concerns that some ministers have too much responsibility to serve their job properly, the government decided to split some of the portfolios. As a result, the work load of certain ministers decreased and each party received one additional minister position, resulting in a total number of 17 ministers in the government.

On 13 June 2017, the five ministerial portfolios belonging to the Finns Party were granted to Blue Reform.

Portfolio	Minister	Took office	Left office	Party
Prime Minister	Juha Sipilä	29 May 2015	6 June 2019	Centre
Minister deputising for the Prime Minister	Timo Soini	29 May 2015	28 June 2017	Finns
Minister deputising for the Prime Minister	Petteri Orpo	28 June 2017	6 June 2019	National Coalition
Minister for Foreign Affairs	Timo Soini	29 May 2015	6 June 2019	Sin.
Minister for Foreign Trade and Development	Lenita Toivakka	29 May 2015	22 June 2016	National Coalition
Minister for Foreign Trade and Development	Kai Mykkänen	22 June 2016	6 February 2018	National Coalition
Minister for Foreign Trade and Development	Anne-Mari Virolainen	6 February 2018	6 June 2019	National Coalition
Minister of Justice and Employment	Jari Lindström	29 May 2015	5 May 2017	Finns
Minister of Justice	Antti Häkkänen	5 May 2017	6 June 2019	National Coalition
Minister of Employment	Jari Lindström	29 May 2015	6 June 2019	Sin.
Minister of the Interior	Petteri Orpo	29 May 2015	22 June 2016	National Coalition
Minister of the Interior	Paula Risikko	22 June 2016	6 February 2018	National Coalition
Minister of the Interior	Kai Mykkänen	6 February 2018	6 June 2019	National Coalition
Minister of Defence	Jussi Niinistö	29 May 2015	6 June 2019	Sin.
Minister of Finance	Alexander Stubb	29 May 2015	22 June 2016	National Coalition
Minister of Finance	Petteri Orpo	22 June 2016	6 June 2019	National Coalition
Minister of Local Government and Public Reforms	Anu Vehviläinen	29 May 2015	29 May 2019	Centre
Minister of Local Government and Transport	Anu Vehviläinen	29 May 2019	6 June 2019	Centre
Minister of Education	Sanni Grahn-Laasonen	29 May 2015	6 June 2019	National Coalition
Minister for European Affairs, Culture and Sport	Sampo Terho	5 May 2017	6 June 2019	Sin.
Minister of Agriculture and Forestry	Jari Leppä	5 May 2017	6 June 2019	Centre
Minister of Transport and Communications	Anne Berner	29 May 2015	29 May 2019	Centre
Minister of Economic Affairs	Olli Rehn	29 May 2015	29 December 2016	Centre
Minister of Economic Affairs	Mika Lintilä	29 December 2016	6 June 2019	Centre
Minister of Social Affairs and Health	Hanna Mäntylä	29 May 2015	25 August 2016	Finns
Minister of Social Affairs and Health	Pirkko Mattila	25 August 2016	6 June 2019	Sin.
Minister of Family Affairs and Social Services	Juha Rehula	29 May 2015	10 July 2017	Centre
Minister of Family Affairs and Social Services	Annika Saarikko	10 July 2017	6 June 2019	Centre
Minister for Housing, Energy and the Environment	Kimmo Tiilikainen	5 May 2017	6 June 2019	Centre

== Policy ==
=== Energy ===
In September 2016, Minister of Economic Affairs Olli Rehn (kesk.) announced his support for enacting an energy subsidy to serve heavy industry's use of oil and coal as a compensatory measure for the expenses arising from the EU's Emissions Trading System. The subsidy would cover about 100 industrial facilities, with the biggest beneficiary being the forestry industry.

=== Economy ===
Sipilä's government has struggled with Finland's poor economic performance, caused according to Paul Krugman and others by the constraints of its eurozone membership and aftershocks from the European debt crisis, but also by the decline of the paper industry, the fall of Nokia and a diminution in exports to Russia. Its attempts to address the problems through policies of cuts to government spending and reducing labour costs have been controversial, particularly those in relation to education spending that have been seen as threatening to Finland's successful public education system. These austerity measures have partly been implemented due to pressure from the European Commission, which has urged Finland to improve its adherence to the Stability and Growth Pact and reform its labour market to improve competitiveness. On 22 July 2015, Sipilä announced the government's commitment to the reduction of Finnish wage costs by 5% by 2019, an internal devaluation caused by Finland's loss of the ability to devalue its currency to boost competitiveness. After a protracted negotiation, the "competitiveness contract" (Finnish: kilpailykykysopimus) was eventually agreed upon in summer 2016, with a coverage of 90% of wage earners and an estimated effect of 4.2% on the cost of labor. In 2017, according to Bank of Finland and SAK economists, the contract proved to be largely successful, with a significant improvement in competitiveness, a 3% growth rate, reduced unemployment, and increased exports.

There have been protests against the government's austerity measures.

=== Development aid ===
Finnish development aid in 2017 was 0.41% of GDP. Sipilä government reduced Finnish support. The reference states Sweden and Norway support was over 1% in 2013.

=== Tax avoidance ===
In 4/2018 Sipilä government reported objective to end the tax planning agreement with Portugal. In 2/2018 the European parliament planned an inquiry into financial crime, tax evasion and tax avoidance including Portugal.

In 2017 Sipilä government reduced sanction of tax evasions from 5% to 2-3 % of fault tax declaration amount of funds. Annual Finnish tax losses in 2017-2016 were over 10 million euros from Caruna electrical grid company in Finland based on interest exemption. In 2017 Caruna turn over was €145 million and tax rate 4% (€6 million). In 2017 Caruna paid its stakeholders 8,17 % interest (77 million) while market loans were 1.5–3 % interest.

According to Finnwatch the planned ownership registers (hallintarekisteri) allows anonym ownership of companies and is a risk for money laundering, insider trading and tax evasion. Despite the critics law was approved in 2018.

== Controversies ==
=== Wrongful claims in proposal to allow indirect securities holding ===
In December 2015, Minister of Finance Alexander Stubb claimed that 90% of civil servants consulted supported a controversial law proposal concerning securities holding, while only 10% had done so. 2 out of 21 experts asked to give their opinion were in favor of the idea. If passed, the proposed legislation would have made it easier to hide one's ownership of securities. Stubb has apologized for his mistake to the parliament. The proposal was later withdrawn by the government.

=== Minister’s tax planning usage in the EU ===
Foreign Trade and Development Minister Lenita Toivakka has connections to a company that has, in turn, established a Belgian holding company. Toivakka accused Social Democratic MP Timo Harakka of lying in front of the parliament when he said that the family business of Minister Toivakka had set up the holding company in Belgium for tax planning purposes. Toivakka later had to apologize and admit that some of her previous statements were misleading, although she admitted to no wrongdoing. She resigned from her ministerial post in 2016 due to the controversy.

=== Katera Steel bid with Terrafame ===
Katera Steel, a company in which Juha Sipilä's two sons hold a 5% share each, won a public bid from the state-owned Terrafame mining company one month before the Prime Minister approved a €100 million public funding for the Talvivaara mine. The winning bid had no connection to new funding for keeping the mine running, as the order would have been executed even in the case of the mine shutting down. The office of the Chancellor of Justice received more than ten complaints about a possible conflict of interest on Sipilä's part. On 1 February 2017, the parliamentary ombudsman ruled in favour of the Prime Minister and found no conflicts of interest in the matter. The ombudsman's report stated in that Sipilä's children did not get any special benefit from the decision to grant Terrafame additional government funds.

=== #Sipilägate ===
In January and February 2017, three journalists, Jussi Eronen, Salla Vuorikoski and Susanne Päivärinta, resigned from the public broadcaster Yle based on disagreements with the editor-in-chief Atte Jääskeläinen on the matter of journalistic integrity. The case concerning Prime Minister Juha Sipilä has been named as one. The Council for the Mass Media in Finland (JSN) ruled that Sipilä had curbed freedom of speech when he bombarded journalists with emails complaining about the story. Finland's media watchdog gave Yle a reprimand over its reporting of a potential conflict of interest in Prime Minister Juha Sipilä's handling of the state-owned mine Terrafame. The council found that Yle changed tack after Sipilä made contact, killing follow-up stories and changing others.

=== Chempolis ===
During an official trade promotion trip to India organized by Team Finland in February 2016, a conflict of interest arose from the inclusion of Chempolis, a company in which the Prime Minister's grown up children hold a 5% stake. Following the trade promotion trip, Chempolis announced a €110 million export contract from an Indian oil company. The Finnish Chancellor of Justice received four separate complaints from private citizens regarding the Prime Minister's role in promoting Chempolis in India. Deputy Chancellor of Justice Risto Hiekkataipale has stated that the Prime Minister did not act improperly in regard to Chempolis. According to the office, Sipilä had not acted impartially by including his relatives' business in the trip program.

=== Constitutional issues ===
According to the Chancellor of Justice of Finland in December 2016, the Sipilä cabinet's law proposals have had major constitutional problems. The Chancellor of Justice criticized the government for attempting to hastily push through a host of new laws, some of which were found to be unconstitutional.

None of the cabinet's ministers have a degree in law.

According to Helsingin Sanomat, the constitutional problems in the Sipilä government's conduct have included the following:

- The government aimed to release the crime of tax evasion from legal consequences.
- The government aimed to raise public funds with twice-higher fines; the intention of the fines was not found to go towards financing the state's expenses.
- The government aimed to create work obligations (unfree labor) and obligatory interviews for unemployed persons by commercial companies.
- The government aimed to reduce the inheritance tax.

=== Terrafame sale to Trafigura ===
The Sipilä cabinet agreed to sell a share of the state-owned mining company Terrafame to multinational commodity trading firm Trafigura. Trafigura made an investment worth 75 million euros to own a 15.5% share in Terrafame. The move has been criticized due to Trafigura's connections to tax havens, as well as the Minister of Economic Affairs Mika Lintilä's (kesk.) close involvement in the efforts to attract a private investor to the project.

=== Electric bike subsidy ===
On March 13, 2018, the Ministry of Transport and Communications announced that starting on July 1, 2018, a subsidy of €400 would be granted to any Finnish citizen purchasing an electric bicycle. Minister of Transport and Communications Anne Berner (C) proposed the subsidy as an incentive to raise the combined modal share of bicycle- and walking-based commuting to 30% nationwide.

On March 21, 2018, Minister of Finance Petteri Orpo (kok.) told Demokraatti that he had only heard about the LVM plan through the press and that he would not support the initiative. Blue Reform chairperson Simon Elo deemed the LVM proposal as fillarikommunismia, (lit. "bike communism"). Berner declared that the ministry would continue to pursue the program's launch, substituting the €400 flat rate with a percentage-based model similar to those in practice in Norway and Sweden.

=== Fortum ===
Fortum is a Finnish state-owned energy company. Sipilä Cabinet approved in 2018 Fortum to buy 47.4% of Uniper shares with €3.7 billion. In 2019 Fortum owned 49,99% of Uniper in 2019. Russian competition authorities have denied Fortum to buy a higher share of company. Uniper operates in the EU countries Germany, Sweden, Netherlands, Belgium, Hungary, France and has offices in the United States, Azerbaijan, Singapore, Russia, the United Kingdom, and the United Arab Emirates. Investment included foreign nuclear power and coal energy and investment in view of human rights controversial economies of Russia, Azerbaijan, Singapore, and the United Arab Emirates. Sipilä cabinet agreed with it.

=== Appointments ===
Minister of Justice Antti Häkkänen (National Coalition Party) selected as his minister helping officer Mr. Tapani Häkkinen. Häkkinen resigned in April 2018 based on corruption investigation. In February 2019 suspicions were forwarded from police to prosecutor. The complex investigation concerns among others real estate and land deals and bribe claims and companies Forma-Futura, HOK-Elanto and Seepsula in Vantaa.

== See also ==
- Finnish Government
- Politics of Finland

Preceded by Alexander Stubb's cabinet	Juha Sipilä's cabinet 29 May 2015 — 6 June 2019	Succeeded by Antti Rinne's cabinet
