= Ministry of Finance (Finland) =

Government ministry of Finland

- Finnish: Valtiovarainministeriö; Swedish: Finansministeriet
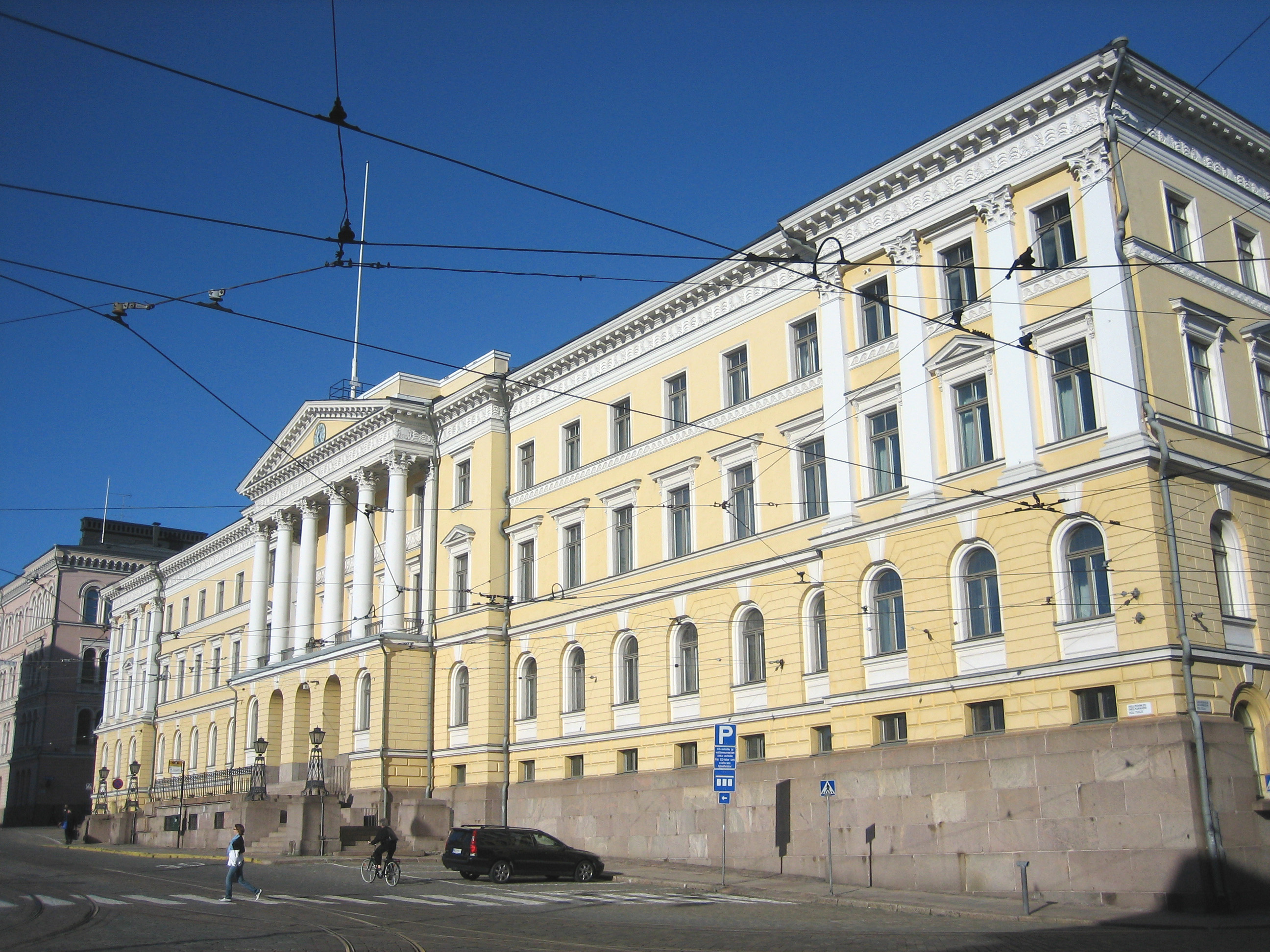
- The Ministry of Finance located at the Government Palace

Ministry overview
- Formed: August 1809 (as the Economic Division of the Finnish Governing Council)
- Jurisdiction: Finnish Government
- Annual budget: €17.195 billion (2018)
- Ministers responsible: Riikka Purra, Minister of Finance; Anna-Kaisa Ikonen, Minister of Local Government
- Ministry executive: Juha Majanen, Permanent Secretary
- Child agencies: Finnish Customs; Financial Stability Authority; Valtori; VATT; Population Register Centre; AVI; Register Offices; Shared Services Center; Statistics Finland; Tax Administration; Treasury
- Website: vm.fi

The Ministry of Finance (FM, Finnish: Valtiovarainministeriö [ˈʋɑltioˌʋɑrɑi̯nˌministeriø], Swedish: Finansministeriet) is one of the 12 ministries which comprise the Finnish Government. The FM prepares the Government's economic and financial policy as well as the state budget, and acts as a tax policy expert. The ministry indirectly employs about 12,000 people through its administrative branch. About 360 people are employed by the ministry itself.

The FM is headed by Finland's Minister of Finance, Riikka Purra, holding the office since 20 June 2023. The ministry's most senior public official is Permanent Secretary Martti Hetemäki.

For 2018, the FM's budget is €17,194,849,000.

== History ==
Along with the Ministry of Justice, the FM is one of the two oldest ministries in Finland. Finland’s fiscal autonomy started in the Diet of Porvoo in 1809, when the Emperor of Russia and Grand Duke of Finland Alexander I solemnly declared that all taxes levied in autonomous Grand Duchy of Finland would be used solely to meet the nation’s own needs. The predecessor of Ministry of Finance was called the Economic Division of The Governing Council. It was founded to manage the civil administrative and economic affairs of the country.
