= Anu Vehviläinen =

Finnish politician (born 1963)

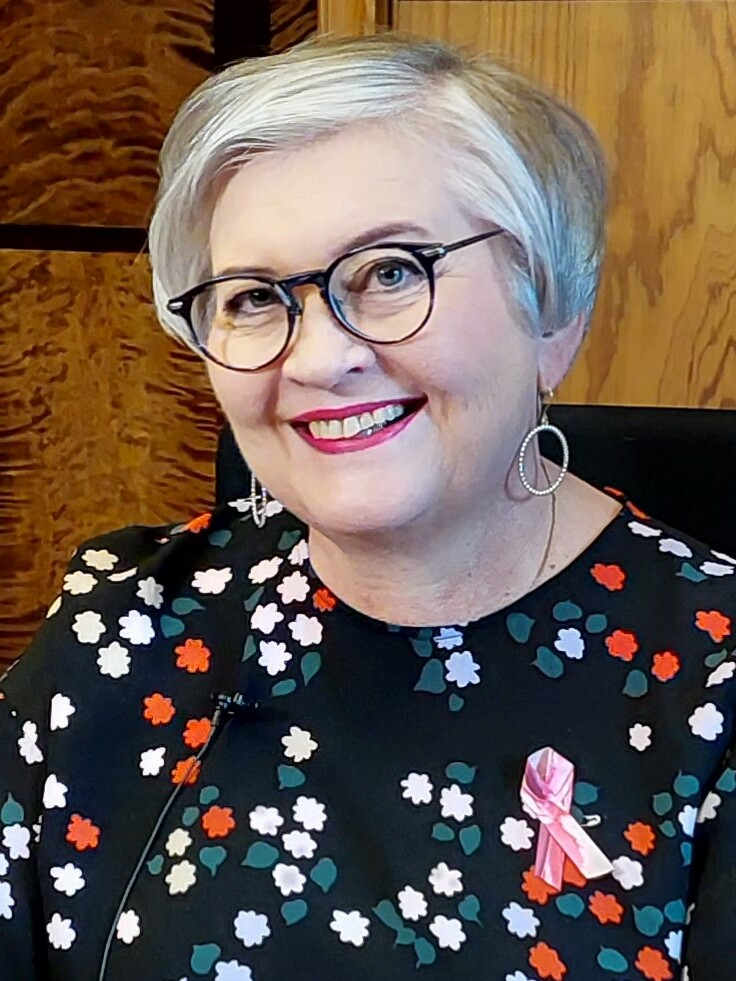
- Vehviläinen in 2021

Speaker of the Parliament of Finland
- In office 9 June 2020 – 1 February 2022
- Deputy: Antti Rinne; Juho Eerola
- Preceded by: Matti Vanhanen
- Succeeded by: Matti Vanhanen

Minister of Local Government and Public Reforms
- In office 29 May 2015 – 6 June 2019
- Prime Minister: Juha Sipilä
- Preceded by: Paula Risikko
- Succeeded by: Sirpa Paatero

Minister of Transport and Communications
- In office 29 May 2019 – 6 June 2019
- Prime Minister: Juha Sipilä
- Preceded by: Anne Berner
- Succeeded by: Sanna Marin
- In office 19 April 2007 – 22 June 2011
- Prime Minister: Matti Vanhanen; Mari Kiviniemi
- Preceded by: Susanna Huovinen
- Succeeded by: Merja Kyllönen

Personal details
- Born: Anu Helena Vehviläinen; 9 September 1963 (age 62) Leppävirta, Finland
- Party: Centre
- Spouse: Timo Hiltunen (1999–2011)

Anu Helena Vehviläinen (born 9 September 1963) is a Finnish politician for the Centre Party who served as Speaker of the Finnish Parliament from 2020 to 2022. She has previously held various cabinet positions, including Finland's Minister of Local Government and Public Reforms in the Sipilä Cabinet from 2015 to 2019; Minister of Transport from May to June 2019; and Minister of Transport in the Vanhanen II and Kiviniemi cabinets from 2007 to 2011.

== Early life and education ==
Vehviläinen was born in Leppävirta. She has a master's degree in Philosophy and is preparing a doctorate degree at the University of Joensuu.

== Political career ==
During his time in parliament, Vehviläinen served on the Committee on Education (1995–1999) and the Committee on Social Affairs and Health (2011–2015, 2019–2020), among others.

From 2015 to 2019, Vehviläinen served as Minister of Local Government and Public Reforms in the cabinet of Prime Minister Juha Sipilä.

In 2020, Vehviläinen was appointed Speaker of the Finnish Parliament after Matti Vanhanen had been appointed Minister of Finance in the Marin Cabinet.

== Other activities ==
- Finnish Innovation Fund (SITRA), Member of the Board (since 2020)

== Honors ==
- Order of the Lion of Finland (Finland, 2022)

Political offices
Preceded by Matti Vanhanen	Speaker of the Parliament of Finland; 2020–2022	Succeeded by Matti Vanhanen
