= Sirpa Paatero =

Finnish politician (born 1964)

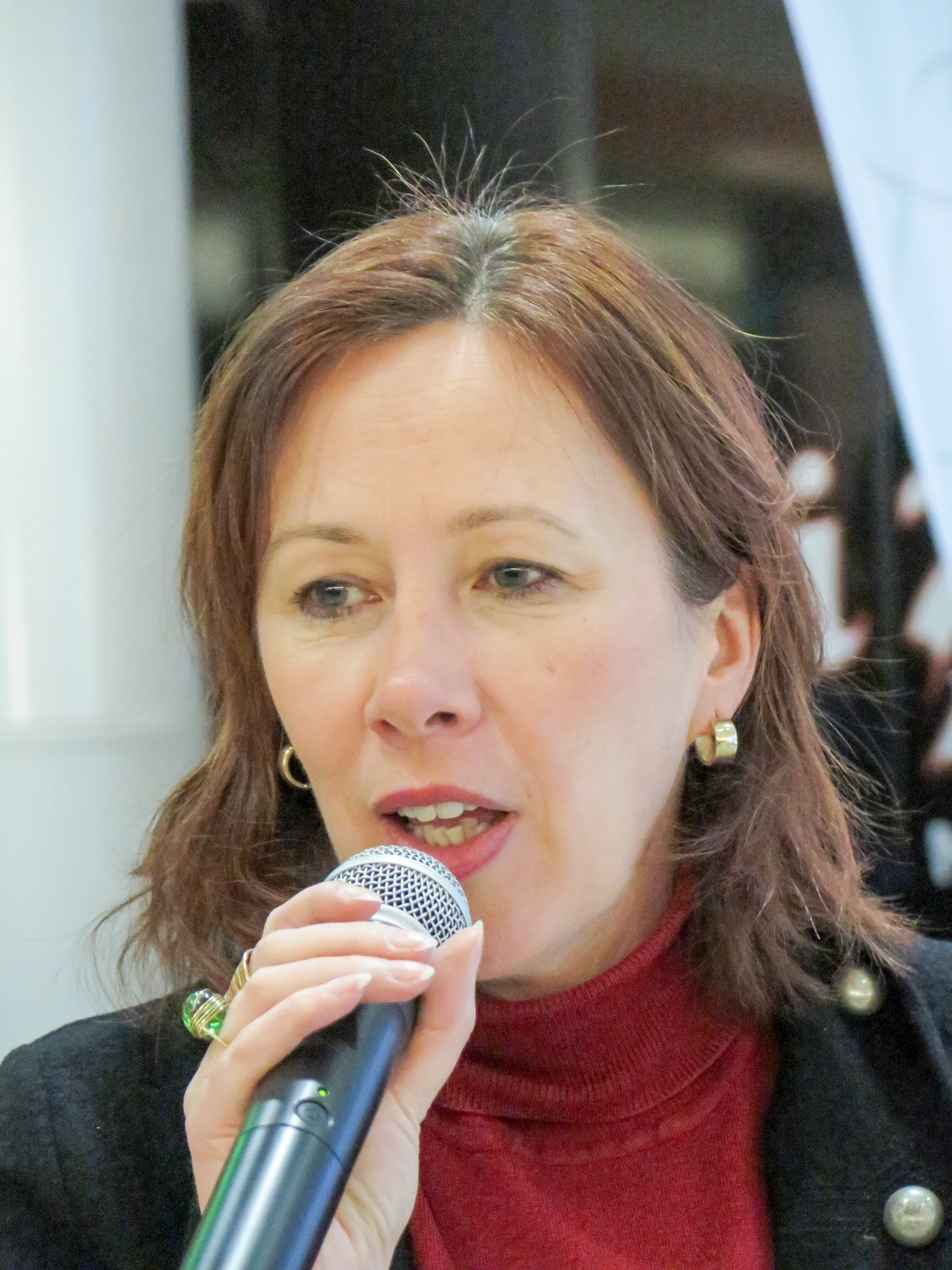

Minister of Local Government
- In office 10 December 2019 – 20 June 2023
- Prime Minister: Sanna Marin
- Preceded by: Anu Vehviläinen
- Succeeded by: Anna-Kaisa Ikonen

Minister of Local Government and Ownership Steering
- In office 6 June 2019 – 10 December 2019
- Prime Minister: Antti Rinne
- Preceded by: Anu Vehviläinen (local government); Mika Lintilä (ownership steering)
- Succeeded by: Tytti Tuppurainen (ownership steering)

Minister for International Development
- In office 26 September 2014 – 29 May 2015
- Prime Minister: Alexander Stubb
- Preceded by: Pekka Haavisto
- Succeeded by: Lenita Toivakka

Personal details
- Born: 9 September 1964 (age 61) Karhula, Kymenlaakso, Finland
- Party: Social Democratic

Sirpa Paatero (born 9 September 1964) is a Finnish politician of the Social Democratic Party (SDP) who served as Minister of Local Government in the government of Prime Minister Sanna Marin from 2019 to 2023.

== Political career ==
In parliament, Paatero served on the Commerce Committee (2006–2014), the Defence Committee (2007–2009, 2015–2019), the Sub-Committee on Employment and Economy Affairs (2011–2014) and the Sub-Committee on Taxes (2012–2014), among others.

Paatero served as the Minister for International Development in Prime Minister Alexander Stubb's cabinet (2014–2015) and again in Antti Rinne's cabinet in 2019. She offered her resignation from the Rinne cabinet in November 2019 after failing to act to prevent state-owned postal services from cutting the pay of around 700 workers.

Paatero is also the chairman of the Finnish Workers' Sports Federation.
