= Lenita Toivakka =

Finnish politician (born 1961)

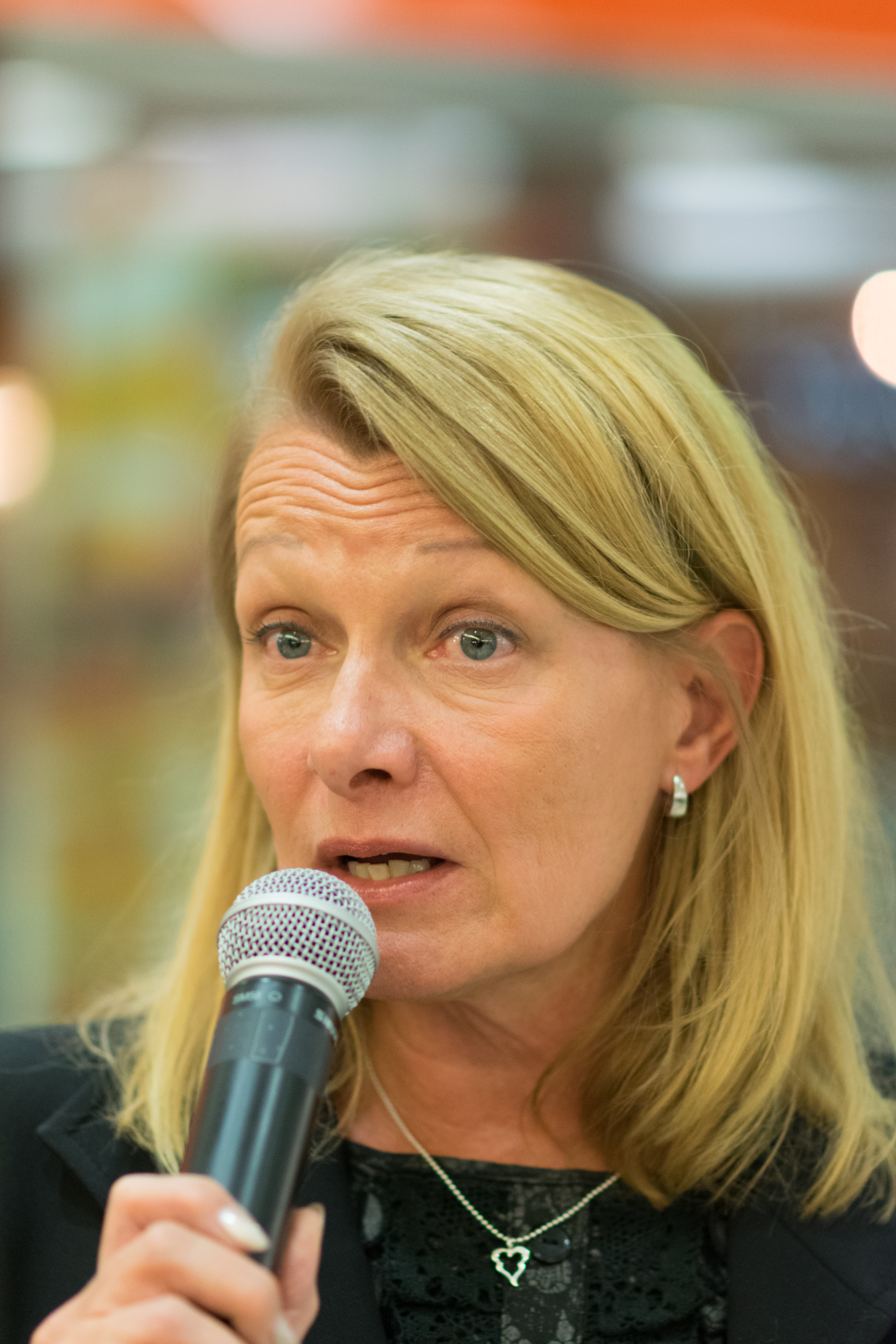

Minister for Foreign Trade and Development
- In office 29 May 2015 – 22 June 2016
- Prime Minister: Juha Sipilä
- Preceded by: Sirpa Paatero
- Succeeded by: Kai Mykkänen

Minister for European Affairs and Foreign Trade
- In office 24 June 2014 – 28 May 2015
- Prime Minister: Alexander Stubb
- Preceded by: Alexander Stubb
- Succeeded by: Timo Soini

Personal details
- Born: 28 September 1961 (age 64) Helsinki, Finland
- Party: National Coalition Party
- Spouse: Jukka Toivakka

Lenita Anneli Toivakka (born 28 September 1961 in Helsinki) is a Finnish politician and a member of National Coalition Party.

== Political career ==
Toivakka is the former Minister for European Affairs and Foreign Trade and Minister for Foreign Trade and Development serving in both in Alexander Stubb's cabinet and Juha Sipilä's cabinet. During her time in office, Finland’s government decided to slash development assistance by 43 percent in 2015. She also served as member of the World Bank Group’s (WBG) Advisory Council on Gender and Development.

On 21 June 2016, Toivakka announced that she would resign due to the tax shelter methods used by her family company and the resulting negative publicity to the party. She was followed by Kai Mykkänen.

== Other activities ==
- Finnish Institute of International Affairs (FIIA), Member of the Board

Political offices
Preceded by Alexander Stubb	Minister for European Affairs and Foreign Trade; 2014–2015	Succeeded by Timo Soini
Preceded by Sirpa Paatero	Minister for Foreign Trade and Development; 2015–2016	Succeeded by Kai Mykkänen
