= Kai Mykkänen =

Finnish politician

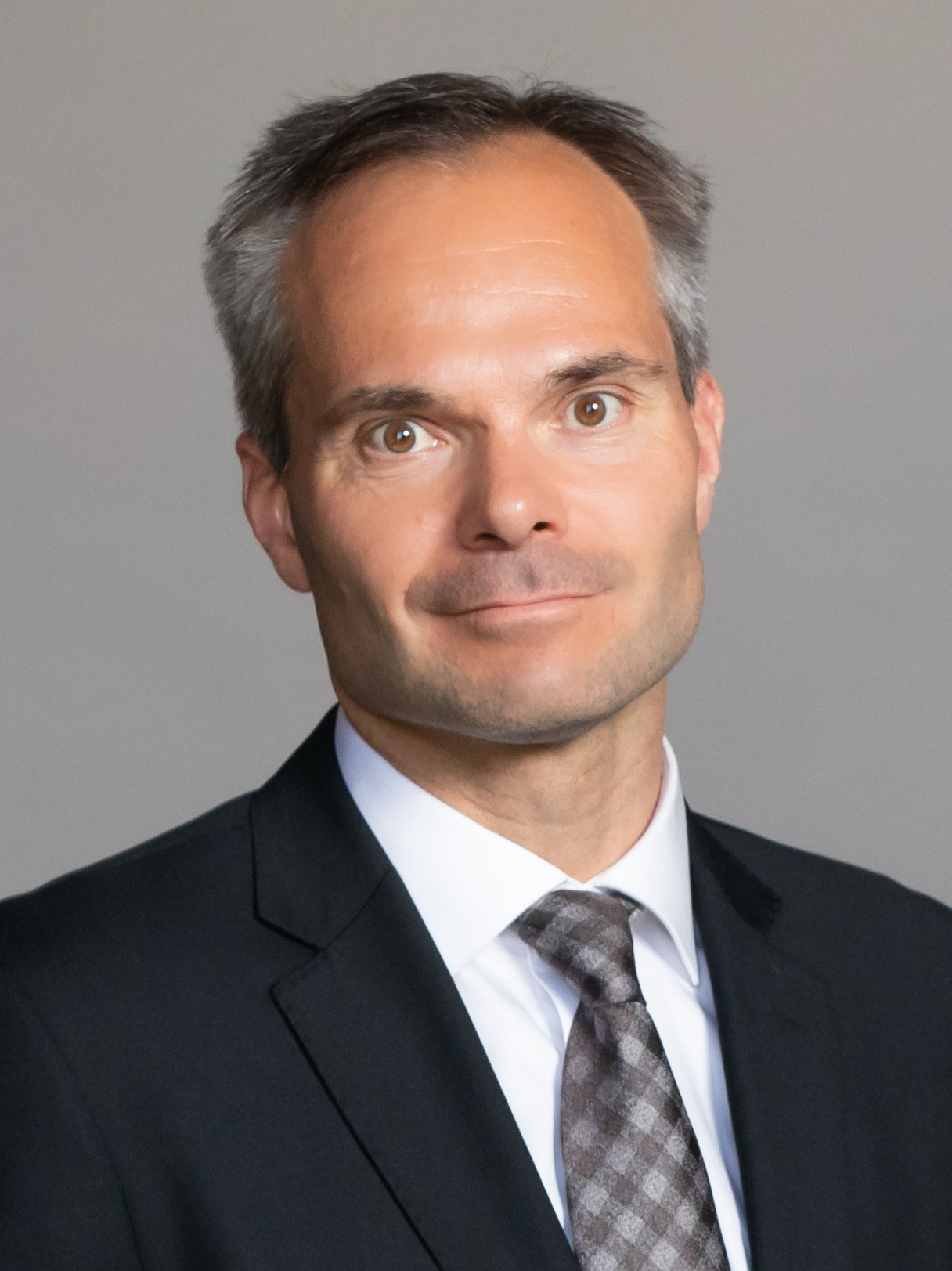
- Mykkänen in 2023

Minister of the Environment and Climate Change
- In office 20 June 2023 – 24 January 2025
- Prime Minister: Petteri Orpo
- Preceded by: Maria Ohisalo
- Succeeded by: Sari Multala

Minister of the Interior
- In office 12 February 2018 – 6 June 2019
- Prime Minister: Juha Sipilä
- Preceded by: Paula Risikko
- Succeeded by: Maria Ohisalo

Minister for Foreign Trade and Development
- In office 22 June 2016 – 12 February 2018
- Prime Minister: Juha Sipilä
- Preceded by: Lenita Toivakka
- Succeeded by: Anne-Mari Virolainen

Member of the Finnish Parliament for Uusimaa
- Incumbent
- Assumed office 22 April 2015

Personal details
- Born: 31 July 1979 (age 47) Espoo, Uusimaa, Finland
- Party: National Coalition Party
- Education: University of Helsinki

Kai Aslak Mykkänen (born 31 July 1979) is a Finnish politician who currently serves as Mayor of Espoo. He served as Minister of the Environment and Climate Change. He is a former Minister of the Interior and represents the National Coalition Party in the Uusimaa electoral district.

== Early life ==
Mykkänen was born in Espoo to the journalist and politician Jouni Mykkänen and Maria Mykkänen (née Sokolow). He is of Russian descent through his mother, who is a daughter of Russian emigrants. His home language was mainly Finnish, but he also speaks fluent Russian. He has worked three years in Russia.

== Political career ==
Mykkänen was the chairman of the Coalition Party Youth League 2000–2001. He was a member of the City Council of Espoo 2001–2008.

Mykkänen was elected to the Parliament of Finland in the 2015 election with 5,260 votes. He was a member of the Environment Committee and Grand Committee from 2015 until 2016.

On 22 June 2016, Mykkänen was appointed as the Minister for Foreign Trade and Development in the cabinet of Prime Minister Juha Sipilä after Lenita Toivakka's resignation. On 6 February 2018, Mykkänen shifted his portfolio in order to replace Paula Risikko as the Minister of the Interior. In this capacity, he also co-chaired the Justice and Home Affairs Ministers Meeting of the European People's Party (EPP), alongside Esteban González Pons.

In June 2023, he was appointed Minister of the Environment and Climate Change in the Orpo Cabinet.

Mykkänen will succeed Jukka Mäkelä as city manager of Espoo on 1 February 2025 when Mäkelä will go on retirement.

== Other activities ==
- World Bank, Ex-Officio Alternate Member of the Board of Governors (2016-2018)

== Political positions ==
As Minister of the Interior, Mykkänen proposed in 2018 to increase Europe's quota refugee system ten-fold, for the EU to receive 250,000 new asylum seekers per year instead of the current 25,000. When the Oulu child sexual exploitation scandal broke out, Mykkänen said these things shouldn't be occurring in Finland and called for immigrants residing at reception centres to be educated.

== Personal life ==
Mykkänen has two children with his wife Anna.

Political offices
Preceded by Maria Ohisalo	Minister of the Environment and Climate Change; 2023–present	Incumbent
Preceded by Paula Risikko	Minister of the Interior; 2018–2019	Succeeded by Maria Ohisalo
Preceded by Lenita Toivakka	Minister for Foreign Trade and Development; 2016–2018	Succeeded by Anne-Mari Virolainen
