= Minister of the Environment, Energy and Housing =

The Minister of the Environment, Energy and Housing (Finnish: asunto-, energia- ja ympäristöministeri, Swedish: bostads-, energi- och miljöminister) was one of the ministerial portfolios which comprised the Sipilä Cabinet. The responsibilities of the Minister of the Environment, the Minister for Housing, and the Minister of Energy were combined in the portfolio. The position was located within the Ministry of the Environment.

The holder of the portfolio for the Sipilä Cabinet was Kimmo Tiilikainen of the Centre Party.
