= Anne-Mari Virolainen =

Finnish politician

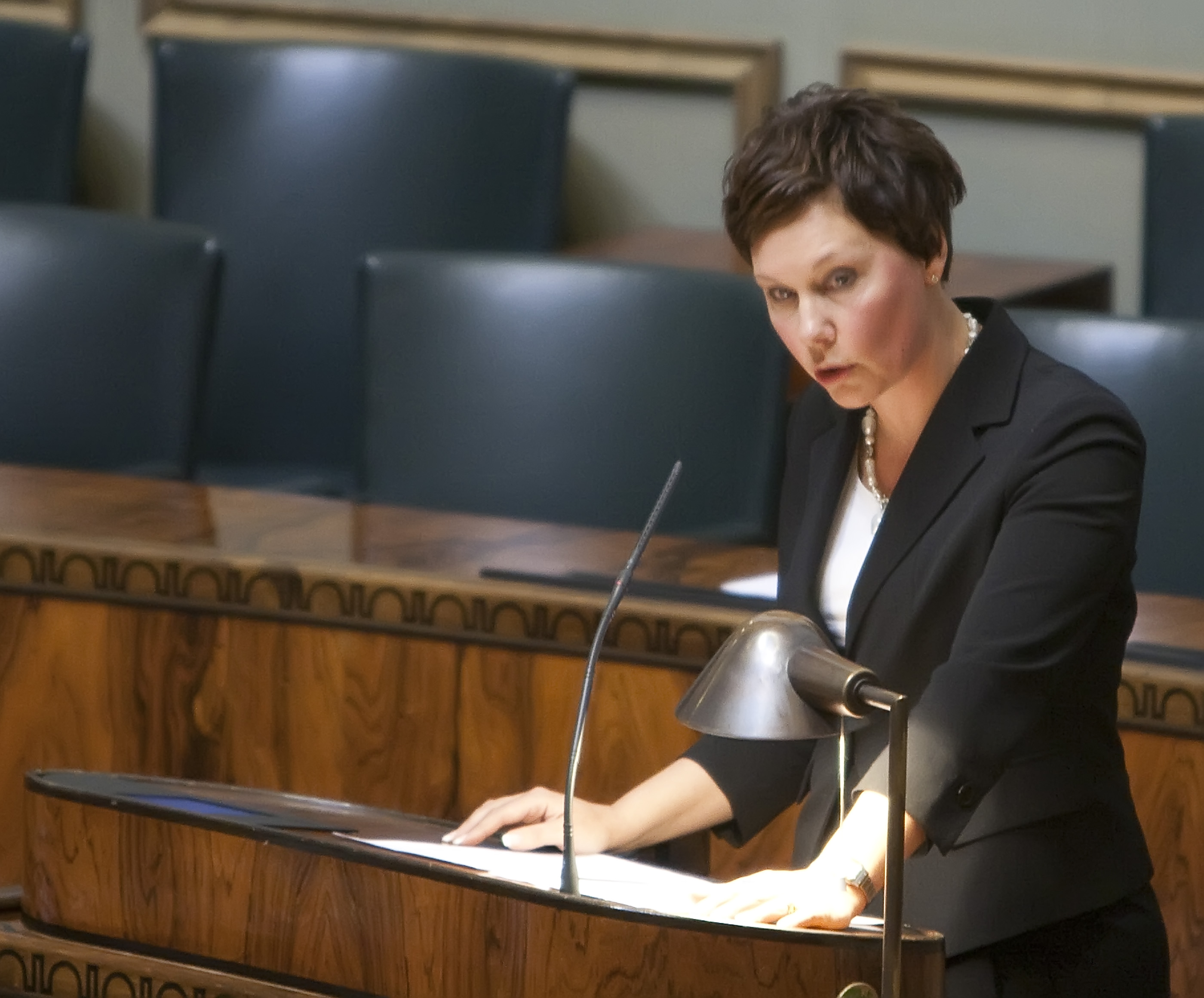

Minister for Foreign Trade and Development
- In office 12 February 2018 – 6 June 2019
- Prime Minister: Juha Sipilä
- Preceded by: Kai Mykkänen
- Succeeded by: Ville Skinnari

Personal details
- Born: 5 December 1965 (age 60) Turku, Southwest Finland, Finland
- Party: National Coalition Party
- Spouse: Petri Virolainen

Anne-Mari Virolainen (born 5 December 1965) is a Finnish politician of the National Coalition Party who has been a member of the Parliament of Finland since 2007, representing Finland Proper.

== Early life and career ==
Virolainen was born in Turku. She graduated from Turku School of Economics as Master of Economics in 1990. She has worked as an executive in Telia InfoMedia, Sonera and ICT Turku.

== Political career ==
Virolainen chaired the municipal council of Lieto from 2005 to 2012. She has been elected to the Parliament four times: with 6,812 votes in 2007, with 10,041 votes in 2011, with 7,169 votes in 2015 and with 7,246 votes in 2019. She served as vice president of the National Coalition Party from 2010 to 2016. Since 2015, Virolainen has chaired the Grand Committee of the Parliament.

On 6 February 2018, after a reshuffle of the ministerial portfolios by the National Coalition party, Virolainen took over as the Minister for Foreign Trade and Development in the Sipilä Cabinet.

== Personal life ==
Virolainen resides in Lieto. She is married to Docent Petri Virolainen with whom she has three children, the oldest of which died in 2005 due to the rare Jansky–Bielschowsky disease.

Political offices
Preceded by Kai Mykkänen	Minister for Foreign Trade and Development; 2018–2019	Succeeded by Ville Skinnari
