= Population Register Centre =

Government agency of Finland

- Finnish: Väestörekisterikeskus

Agency overview
- Formed: 1969
- Headquarters: Helsinki, Finland
- Employees: Approx. 210
- Parent agency: Ministry of Finance
- Website: www.vrk.fi

The Population Register Centre (Finnish: Väestörekisterikeskus, VRK) is a Finnish government agency, which provides demographic information services for Finnish citizens, public administrations, businesses and communities, as well as polling services for elections. The VRK was established in 1969, and is under direct control of Finnish Ministry of Finance.

In 2020, the Population Register Centre, the local register offices (maistraatit) and the Development and Steering Unit for the Local Register Offices (maistraattien ohjaus- ja kehittämisyksikkö) operating under the Regional State Administrative Agency for Eastern Finland were merged into the Digital and Population Data Services Agency (Digi- ja väestötietovirasto, DVV).
