= Anna-Kaisa Ikonen =

Finnish politician (born 1977)

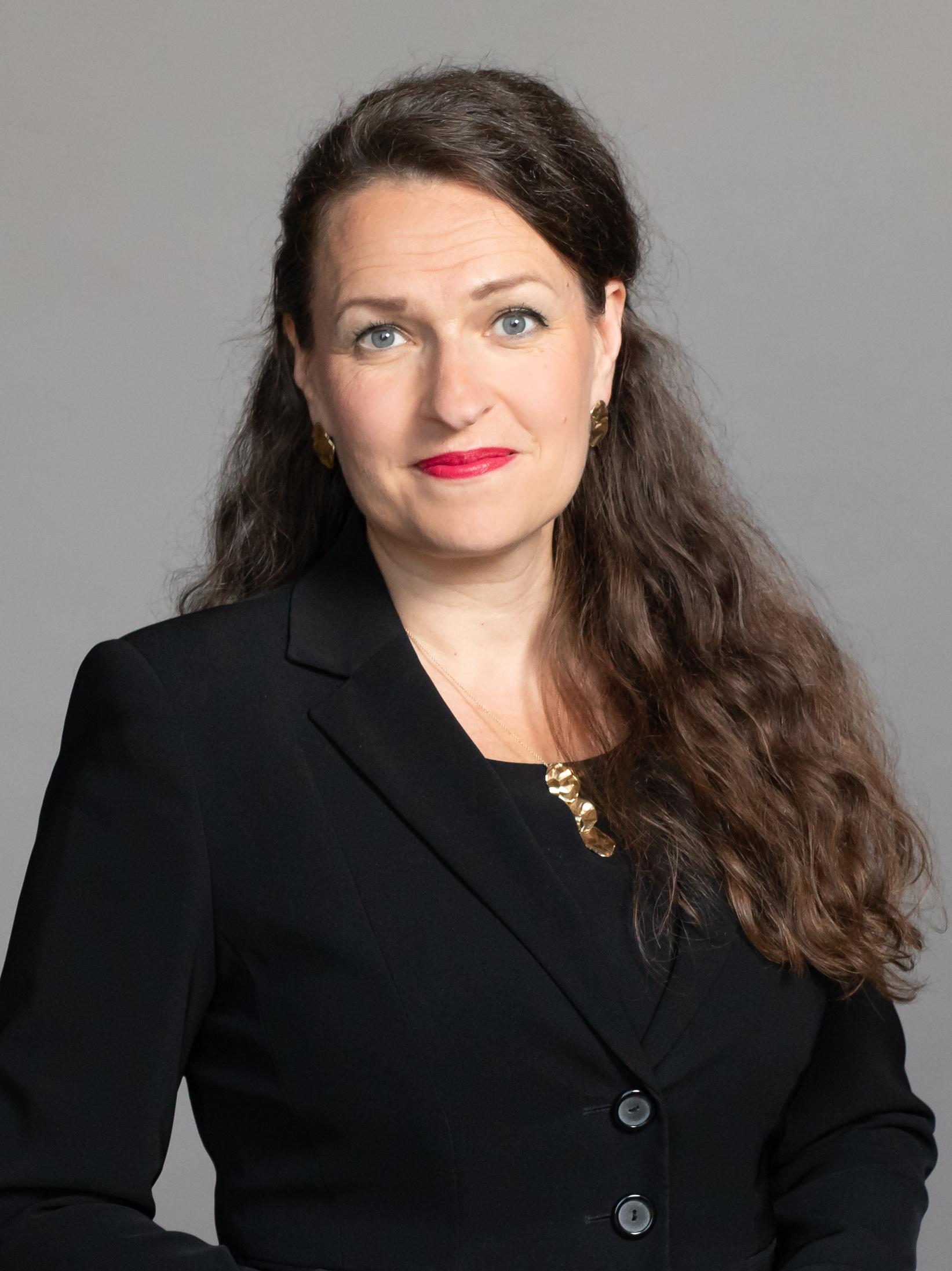
- Ikonen in 2023

Minister of Local and Regional Government
- Incumbent
- Assumed office 20 June 2023
- Prime Minister: Petteri Orpo
- Preceded by: Sirpa Paatero

Member of the Finnish Parliament for Pirkanmaa
- Incumbent
- Assumed office 17 April 2019
- Parliamentary group: National Coalition Party

Personal details
- Born: Anna-Kaisa Ikonen; 4 April 1977 (age 49) Tampere, Häme Province, Finland
- Party: National Coalition Party
- Education: University of Tampere
- Occupation: Professor of practice
- Website: https://www.anna-kaisaikonen.fi/

Anna-Kaisa Ikonen (born 4 April 1977) is a Finnish politician currently serving in the Parliament of Finland representing the National Coalition Party from the Pirkanmaa constituency. She served as the mayor of Tampere between 2013 and 2017 and won the city council election in 2021.

In June 2023, she was appointed Minister of Local and Regional Government in the Orpo Cabinet.
