= Minister of Justice and Employment =

The Minister of Justice and Employment used to be a ministerial position inside of the Finnish Government. The portfolio has since been divided into the following:

- Minister of Justice (Finland)
- Minister of Employment (Finland)
