= Anne Berner =

Finnish politician and business executive

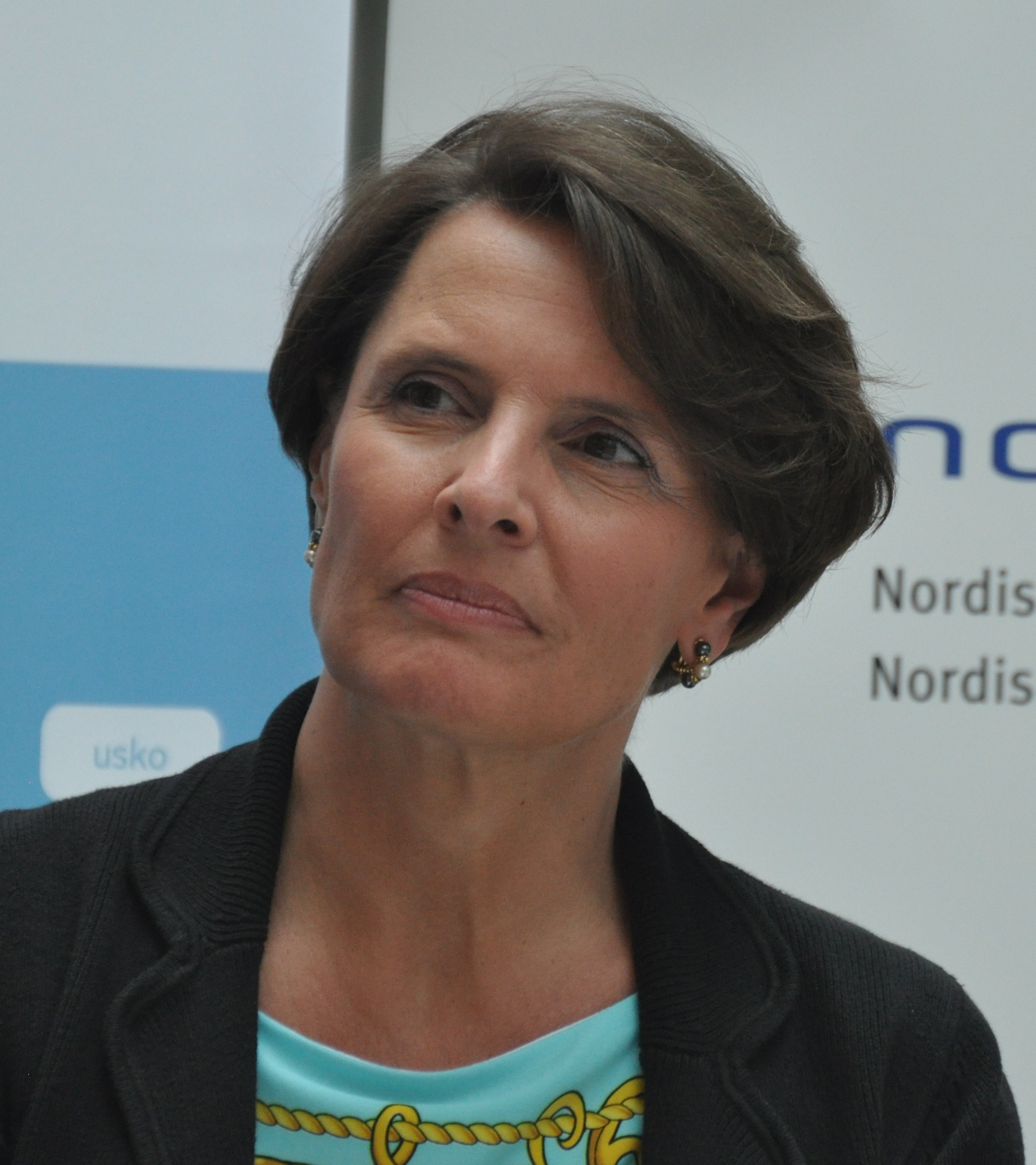
- Berner in 2015

Minister of Transport and Communications
- In office 29 May 2015 – 29 May 2019
- Prime Minister: Juha Sipilä
- Preceded by: Paula Risikko
- Succeeded by: Anu Vehviläinen

Personal details
- Born: Anne-Catherine Berner; 16 January 1964 (age 62) Helsinki, Finland
- Citizenship: Finland; Switzerland
- Spouse: Pekka Karkkolainen
- Children: 3
- Education: Hanken School of Economics
- Awards: Prix Veuve Clicquot

Anne-Catherine Berner (born 16 January 1964) is a Finnish business executive, board professional, and the former Minister of Transport and Communications. In 2015, Berner was elected Member of the Finnish Parliament from the electoral district of Uusimaa as a non-attached candidate representing the Centre Party. Born in Helsinki into a Swiss family, Berner uses Swiss German as her mother tongue within the family, and is fluent in Finnish, Swedish, German, English and French. Berner became a dual citizen of Switzerland and Finland after acquiring Finnish citizenship in 2015.

Berner has a long career leading Vallila Interior, a family-owned interior design company.

Before her career in the Finnish Parliament, Berner was known for leading the New Children's Hospital 2017 project and for chairing the board of the New Children's Hospital Foundation. Berner was also familiar through appearances in the television show Dragons' Den of Finland and Sweden.

== Early life ==
Berner was born in Helsinki to a Swiss family. She was the first of four children. She spent her childhood in Helsinki and attended a German school for twelve years. Berner's background was modest, living in a small apartment and sharing the same room with her three brothers. Berner had an interest in medicine at a young age when she became acquainted with the pathological institute as a summer worker. She got her apprenticeship from Zurich Medical University but returned to Finland after her mother became ill. Obligations to take care of the mother first and later to the family company, made Berner settle in Finland.

She completed a Master of Science in Economics at the Hanken School of Economics.

== Career in business and philanthropy ==
In 1986, Berner first received a fixed-term work permit to work at her family company, Vallila Silkkitehdas Osakeyhtiö. She was the ninth employee of the company, whose turnover at that time was FIM 22 million. Berner has stated that, at the beginning of her family business career, she traveled 70,000 kilometers a year to sell fabrics to architects.

In 1989 she became the managing director of Vallila Interior, succeeding her father Rudolf Berner. She became chair of the company in 2012. During her time as CEO, Vallila grew in size from about 10 people to more than 140 employees in 2014.

=== Vallila Interior CEO ===
In 1986, Berner started a new project design business through Vallila Interior Contracting Oy and three years later, in 1989, she became CEO of the company at the age of 25. The parent company was renamed Vallila Interior and, under Berner's leadership, the company was given contracts for public buildings. The company carried also out decorations for cruisers, including the curtains of all cabins of the Oasis cruise ship built at STX's Turku shipyard. In 2008, Berner was responsible for furnishing the three SOK-owned hotels in St. Petersburg. In Russia, Vallila Interior has implemented hotel and restaurant projects since 1992.

In the early 2000s, Vallila's subsidiaries, Keha Oy, Decohouse Oy and Vallila Interior Contracting Oy, merged under the name of Vallila Interior. Berner re-launched Vallila's textile design. Vallila launched its own textile collection in 2007, and during the 2010s, the Vallila brand became a well-known home textile brand in Finland.

=== The New Children's Hospital in Helsinki ===
Before entering politics, Berner was best known as the public face and leader of a charity project to build a new children's hospital in Helsinki. The new children's hospital was formally scheduled for completion in 2017, in time to commemorate the centenary of Finnish independence. Berner serves on the hospital's support association, support foundation as chair from 2012 to present.

Berner created a funding organization in 2013, and construction of the hospital began in 2014. The hospital opened in 2018.

=== Nadija Foundation ===
Berner is the founder and chair of the Nadija Foundation, whose goal is to provide rehabilitation and care for Ukrainian children affected by war. Berner began work toward this project after the 2022 Russian invasion of Ukraine.

The foundation's goals include a physical children's hospital in Lviv, a virtual hospital providing online therapy, and a research institute to study what does and does not work in helping children affected by PTSD. The estimated fundraising goal as 150 million euros ($164 million), of which 900,000 euros had been collected by the end of 2023.

== Media appearances ==
Berner has participated as a venture capitalist on Finland's and Sweden's versions of the television show Dragons' Den: in 2013 she participated in the Finnish version, Leijonan luola, while in 2014 she participated in the Swedish version, Draknästet.

== Political career ==
Berner was elected into the Finnish Parliament for Uusimaa in 2015 as a nonpartisan candidate for the Centre Party of Finland. She was then appointed to the Sipilä's government, as the Minister of Transport and Communications in May 2015. Upon appointment to the government, she took the Centre Party membership. Berner's duties also included acting as the minister for Nordic Cooperation and the minister for Åland Island affairs.

Berner's political views has been described as influenced by classical liberalism, with a strong belief in the value of entrepreneurship and responsible ownership. Berner stated that she would only serve for four years in public office—one Finnish parliament election cycle.

=== Minister of Transport and Communications ===
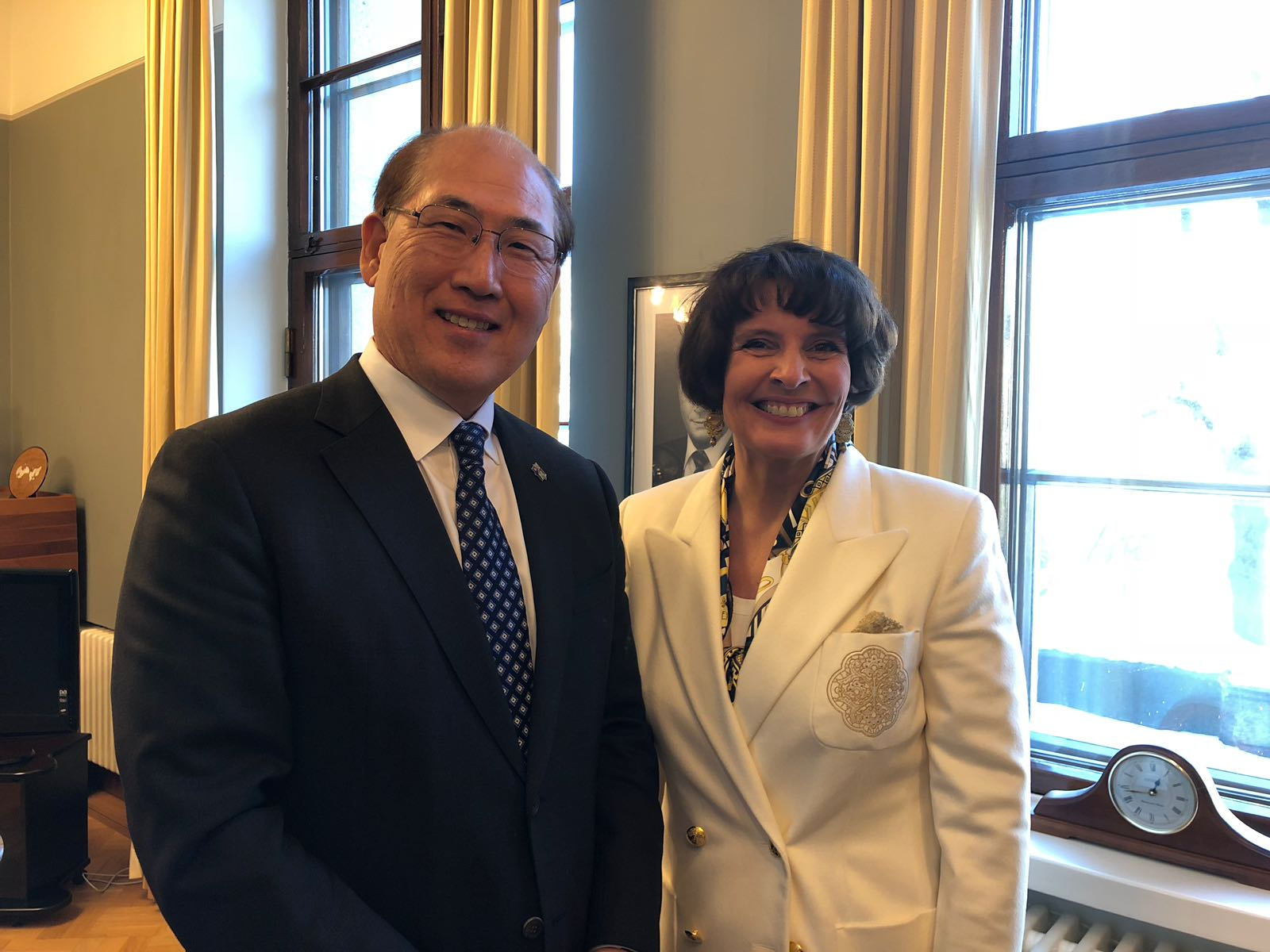
Kitack Lim with Berner in 2018

During her ministerial term, the organisation of the Ministry of Transport and Communications and the entire branch of government was reformed to address to the changes in transport and communications.

One of her key political projects was a comprehensive legislative reform regulating the transport sector market, brought under one umbrella in the Transport Services Act. The Act combines legislation on transport markets and creates conditions for digitalisation and new business models in transport, including, among other things, seamless, multimodal travel chains. The reform entered into force on 1 July 2018.

The Act on Transport Services has been praised as forward-looking and modern. It has been recognised internationally and it received The GSMA Government Leadership Award in 2019. The Act on Transport Services lays the foundation for transport as a service. It approaches transport services from the point of view of smooth travel chains. The Act is the first of its kind in the world. The act has also received its share of criticism after being enacted, for example from the Taxi Union of Finland who blame the Ministry of Transport and Communications of leaving them with problems mostly created by the act.

Berner's responsibilities in Sipilä's Government included deregulation, which was one of the Government's key projects. The Postal Act, the Driving Licence Act, the Road Traffic Act, the Highways Act, the Private Roads Act, and the Vehicle Inspection Act have also been revised during the Government term. The efficiency of transport has been improved and studies have been made relating to the introduction of passenger cars with speed limiters and the revision of regulation concerning snowmobiles. Revisions made to the Code for Information Society and Communications Services and licences regulation have relaxed especially the regulation of television and radio broadcasting. A new Rail Transport Act and an overall reform of the Waterborne Transport Act are also under preparation.

During her term in the Government, Minister Berner did actively promote work against climate change, and pushed for making Finland's transport sector carbon-free by 2045.

Berner has been actively involved in the FinEst Link initiative, which aims to develop mobility between Helsinki and Tallinn; the project looks into the economic preconditions and impact of the proposed Helsinki–Tallinn railway tunnel, for instance.

Berner stated in 2016 that she hoped that after 20 years she would be remembered as a person who made far-reaching, brave decisions, which led to wide-ranging benefits to Finland.

On May 29, 2019, Berner was released from her position as minister, due to her duties at the board of directors of SEB Group starting in June 2019. She was succeeded by Anu Vehviläinen.

== Memberships ==
Berner has had a long career as a board professional on several publicly listed Finnish and international companies, such as Soprano plc, Kährs Holding AB, the mutual pension insurance company Ilmarinen, the financial group SEB, and the pharmaceutical group Grifols.

Berner's organizational career include chairing the Finnish Family Firms Association 2005–2008, the Association for Finnish Work as chairman between 2010–2013 and 2013–2015, and the European Family Businesses 2011–2015 as member of the board.

== Awards and honors ==
In 2006, Berner received the Prix Veuve Clicquot as the Finnish businesswoman of the year. The Finnish Businessmen's Association named her in 2009 as the businessman of the year. In 2014, Berner was given the order of Commander of the Order of the Lion of Finland by the President of the Republic.

== Controversies ==
=== Board seat in Luxembourg ===
In August 2015, YLE reported that Berner would have acted as a member of a Luxembourg tax haven company's board of directors. The Luxemburg-based investment fund Triton is the current owner of Swedish flooring manufacturer Kährs. Berner has told that she was serving on the board of Hartwall Capital in 2012, when Upoflor was merged with the Swedish company Kährs. Berner continued after the merger on the board of Kährs Ltd. Berner has had no ownership in neither company, and has paid payroll taxes on any compensations in Finland. Berner resigned from the position upon election to the parliament.

=== Vallila Interior ===
According to Finnwatch Minister Berner owned company Vallila Interior’s Indian subcontractor employees report illegally low wages and forced overtime work. Berner owns ca 30% of Vallila Collection. Before being minister in 2015, she owned more than 60% of the firm, but subsequently handed over about half to her sons.
