= Minister of Local Government and Ownership Steering (Finland) =

Government portfolio in Finland

The Minister of Local Government and Ownership Steering (Finnish: kunta- ja omistajaohjausministeri, Swedish: kommun- och ägarstyrningsminister, formerly Minister of Local Government and Public Reforms) is one of the Finnish Government's 19 ministerial portfolios. Administratively, the portfolio is located within the Ministry of Finance. The ministerial position is responsible for Finland's municipal and regional government operations, the public sector's ICT, the financial control of government assets, and the Ministry of Finance's statistical functions.

The incumbent Minister of Local Government and Ownership Steering for the Orpo Cabinet is Anna-Kaisa Ikonen of the National Coalition Party.

== See also ==
- Ministry of Finance (Finland)
- Politics of Finland
