= Green League =

Finnish political party

Green League Vihreä liitto (Finnish) Gröna förbundet (Swedish) Ruoná lihttu (Northern Sami) Ruánáá litto (Inari Sami) Ruânn lett (Skolt Sami)
- Abbreviation: Vihr
- Chairperson: Sofia Virta
- Secretary: Anna Moring
- Parliamentary group leader: Oras Tynkkynen
- Deputy chairs: Allu Pyhälammi, Jenni Pitko and Shawn Huff
- Chair of the party council: Heidi Aaltonen
- Founded: 28 February 1987; 39 years ago
- Legalised: 1988; 38 years ago
- Headquarters: Mannerheimintie 15b A, 00260 Helsinki
- Think tank: Ajatuspaja Visio
- Women's wing: Vihreät Naiset
- Youth and student wing: Federation of Green Youth and Students
- Membership (2024): ▲9,000
- Ideology: Green politics
- Political position: Centre-left
- European affiliation: European Green Party
- European Parliament group: Greens–European Free Alliance
- International affiliation: Global Greens
- Nordic affiliation: Centre Group
- Colors: Dark green
- Slogan: Neljän vuodenajan puolesta ('For the four seasons')
- Eduskunta: 13 / 200
- European Parliament: 2 / 15
- Municipalities: 418 / 8,586
- County seats: 107 / 1,379

Website
- vihreat.fi

The Green League, (Note: Finnish: Vihreä liitto [ˈʋihreæ ˈliːtːo], Vihr; Swedish: Gröna förbundet [ˈɡrøːnɑ fœrˈbʉndet]; Northern Sami: Ruoná lihttu; Inari Sami: Ruánáá litto; Skolt Sami: Ruânn lett) shortened to the Greens, (Note: Finnish: Vihreät; Swedish: de Gröna) is a green political party in Finland. Ideologically, the Green League is positioned on the centre-left of the political spectrum.

Originally split on whether Finland should join the European Union, the Green League adopted a pro-European stance. It was the first Finnish party in favor of the federalisation of the European Union. The Green League is among the midsized political parties in Finland. The Greens hold thirteen of the 200 seats in the Finnish Parliament and two of Finland's 15 European Parliament seats. The party is a member of the Global Greens and the European Green Party; its MEPs sit in the Greens–European Free Alliance group in the European Parliament.

Founded in 1987, the party absorbed a number of green organizations and their members, electing its first MPs in the 1987 Finnish parliamentary election. The party won ten seats in the 1991 election. Despite small losses in the 1995 election, Pekka Haavisto joined Paavo Lipponen's first cabinet, which was composed of a "rainbow" coalition. This made the Green League the first green party to form a national cabinet. The party remained in government until 2002 when it resigned in opposition to nuclear power. The party slowly rose in popularity between 1995 and 2007, winning a total of 15 seats, and joined the centre-led Vanhanen II cabinet. In the 2011 election, the party suffered significant losses, dropping to ten seats, but remained in government. In 2015, the party recovered its losses, returning to 15 seats. In the 2019 election, the party achieved by far its best-ever result, winning 20 seats and 11.5% of the vote. They became the fifth-largest party in parliament and the third biggest member of the Rinne cabinet.

After the 2017 municipal elections, the Green League was the fourth-largest party with 534 seats. They gained 211 more seats since the 2012 Finnish municipal elections. Since June 2023, the party's leader and chairperson has been Sofia Virta. From 2015 to 2019, the party was in opposition. It provided harsh criticism regarding the policies of the conservative Sipilä cabinet on financial support for economically well-off companies, Fortum's purchase of Uniper, and the expedited process of constitution-changing surveillance laws.

== History ==
=== Founding ===
The Green League was founded on 28 February 1987 and was registered as a political party the next year. Political activity had begun already in the early 1980s, when environmental activists, feminists, disillusioned young politicians from the marginalized Liberal People's Party and other active groups began to campaign on green issues in Finland. In 1995, it was the first European green party to be part of a state-level cabinet.

The party was founded as a popular movement, which explains its name's descriptor, liitto, "league". Initially, there was much resistance within the movement against founding a political party, motivated by Robert Michels' iron law of oligarchy, which claims that movements inevitably degenerate into oligarchies when they create a formal organization. When initially founded, membership figures could not be established with certainty because people could join more than one of the nine geographic and affinity groups established, could also be members of other political parties, and the party's council included representatives from non-party organisations: estimates of membership around this time ranged from 700 to 1,000. The party still stresses openness and democratic decision-making, even if the Finnish word, "liitto", has been dropped from the party's website and advertisements, the word still remains in its official and registered name.

=== Origins (1976–1982) ===
One of the early forerunners of green electoral activity in Finland was the Helsinki Movement, which stood in Helsinki's municipal elections in 1976 on an anti-urban sprawl platform, winning 1,700 votes - 0.7 percent of the total, but not winning any seats.

In the late 1970s the milieu within which Finnish political ecology would develop grew, with contacts between environmentalist, anti-nuclear, peace and human rights activists increasing, culminating in the Koijärvi Movement in 1979-1980 against the draining of Lake Koijärvi, an important bird habitat in southern Finland. Although the movement, which radicalised from using legal channels to embracing civil disobedience, was unsuccessful, it has been credited as the birthplace of Finnish green politics. In 1980 the Alternative Helsinki list, the successor to the Helsinki Movement, contested the Helsinki municipal elections stressing urban sprawl, urban planning and traffic as key issues, scoring 1.7 percent of the vote and electing Amnesty International activist Ville Komsi to the city council. In 1982 the first of several national conferences of ecological and radical left activists was held to coordinate the work of the movement.

=== Early activities (1983–1994) ===
The first two parliamentary representatives were elected even before the registration, in the 1983 parliamentary election, namely Komsi and disability activist Kalle Könkkölä. These were the first independent representatives in the Finnish Parliament. Green candidates stood in seven of the 14 electoral districts and scored 40,000 votes, 1.5 percent of the total, achieving 3.3 percent in Uusimaa and 4.5 percent in Helsinki. The Green conference in Jyväskylä that year developed policy and considered the role of extra-parliamentary action in the movement.

In the following year's municipal elections, 350 Green candidates stood in 69 of the 461 municipalities, winning 2.8 percent of the nationwide vote, six percent in constituencies where they stood, and a total of 101 councillors. 11 percent of the vote was achieved in Espoo and the Green presence on Helsinki city council was increased to seven seats. That year's Green conference in Oulu led to the agreement of four principles to underpin policies known as the Oulu theses. The 1986 Green conference in Espoo, held in the wake of the Chernobyl disaster, agreed to oppose the construction of a fifth Finnish nuclear power plant. In 1987 the number of seats rose to four, however the result was seen as a disappointment, with the party polling between six and ten percent but only winning four percent of the vote at the polls. Some observers blamed the party's lack of discipline as being off-putting to voters, and credited a strong TV debate performance by MP Pekka Haavisto for limiting damage to the Green vote.

In 1991 the party won a total of ten seats.

About half of the party's members were against Finland joining the European Union in 1994. Later, polls showed that most Greens were anti-Eurozone. The party heads declined to fight against euro-adoption.

=== As part of the Lipponen Cabinets (1995–2003) ===
In the 1995 election, the Green League received a total of nine seats out of 200. The party joined the coalition cabinet led by the Social Democratic Party, and Pekka Haavisto became the Minister of the Environment, thus becoming the first green minister in Europe.

The Green League received 7.3% of the vote, and gained two additional seats in the 1999 election, raising the total to 11. The Greens continued in the next coalition cabinet, but resigned in protest on 26 May 2002, after the cabinet's decision to allow the construction of a new nuclear plant was accepted by the parliament.

=== Growth to mainstream appeal (2003–present) ===
In 2003, the Green League received 8.0% of the vote, receiving a total of 14 seats. They increased their seats to 15 in the 2007 election while receiving 8.5% of the vote. In the 2011 election, the party lost five seats.

In the 2009 European Parliament elections, the Greens gained two of the thirteen Finnish seats in the European Parliament, which were occupied by Satu Hassi and Heidi Hautala.

At the municipal level, the Greens are an important force in the politics of the main cities of Finland. In the municipal election of 2008 the Greens received 8.9% of the vote; the vote share was considerably higher in Helsinki, where the Greens became the second-largest party with 23.2% of the vote. In several other cities, the Greens achieved the position of the third-largest party. The Greens are weaker in rural area and especially in municipalities that experience high levels of outward migration.

By the 2017 Green League party congress, Niinistö had served three full two-year terms as the chairman and stepped down according to the rules of the party. In the following leadership election, there were six candidates running for party chairman, of whom MP Touko Aalto won the election.

Soon after Aalto's election, the popularity of the Green League surged in the polls and raised briefly as the second most popular party in the country. However, in September 2017 the poll numbers turned into a downward slope, which continued until autumn 2018. After taking a month of sick leave due to exhaustion in September 2018, Aalto soon announced that he was resigning from his post, citing depression and fatigue.

In November 2018, the Green League decided to choose a temporary chairman to lead the party into the 2019 parliamentary elections and until the next party convention. In the leadership election, former chairman Pekka Haavisto was once again elected as chairman.

In June 2019, Haavisto stepped down as the chairman of the party. Maria Ohisalo was the only candidate in the leadership election and was thus elected as chairman in the city of Pori.

In the 2023 parliamentary election, Ohisalo was re-elected with 6,937 votes. However, as the Greens suffered an election defeat, Ohisalo announced that she would not seek another term as chairman. In June 2023, she was replaced by Sofia Virta.

== Ideology and policies ==
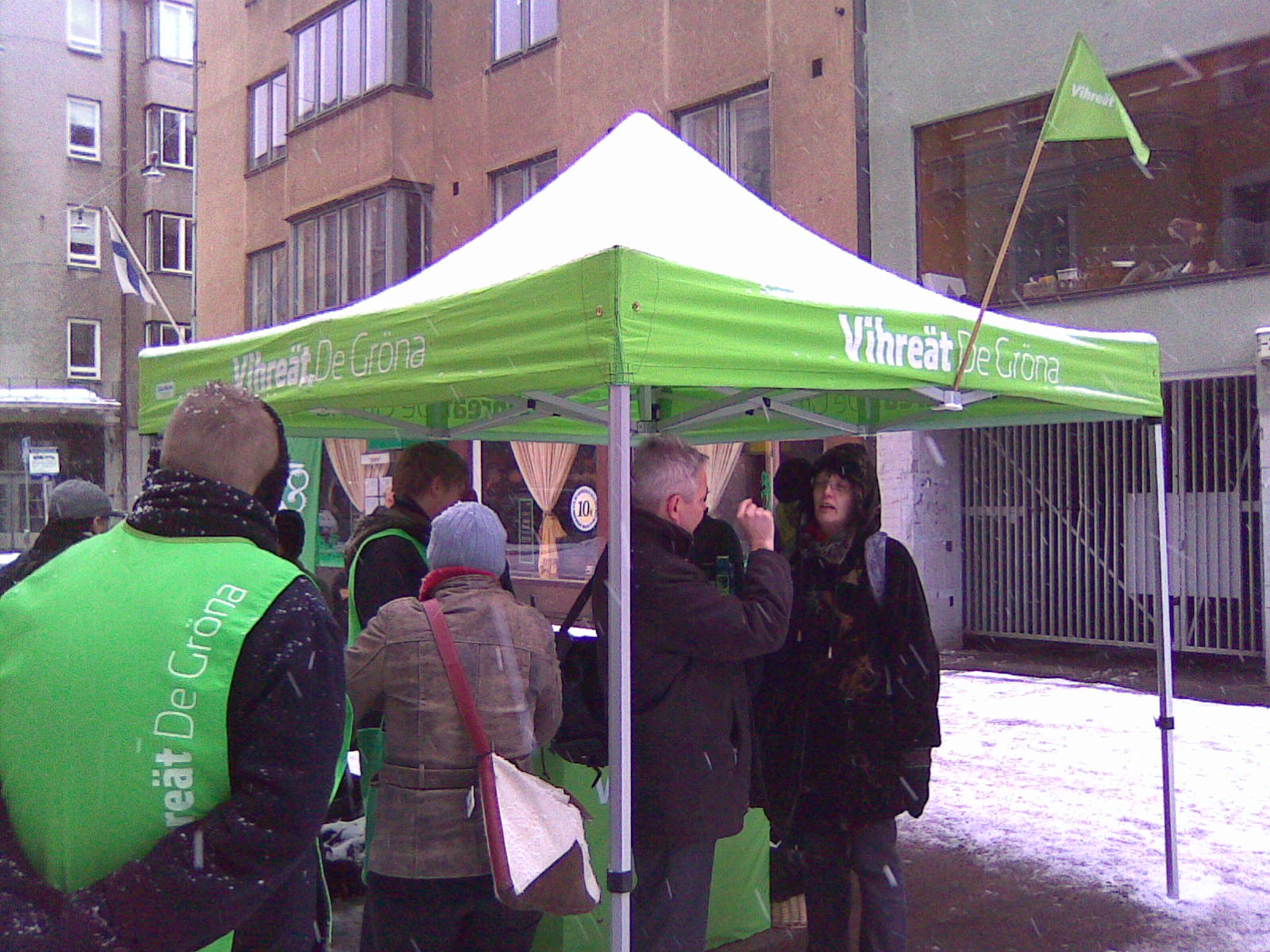
An election canvassing tent for the Greens on Iso Roobertinkatu in Helsinki in 2011.

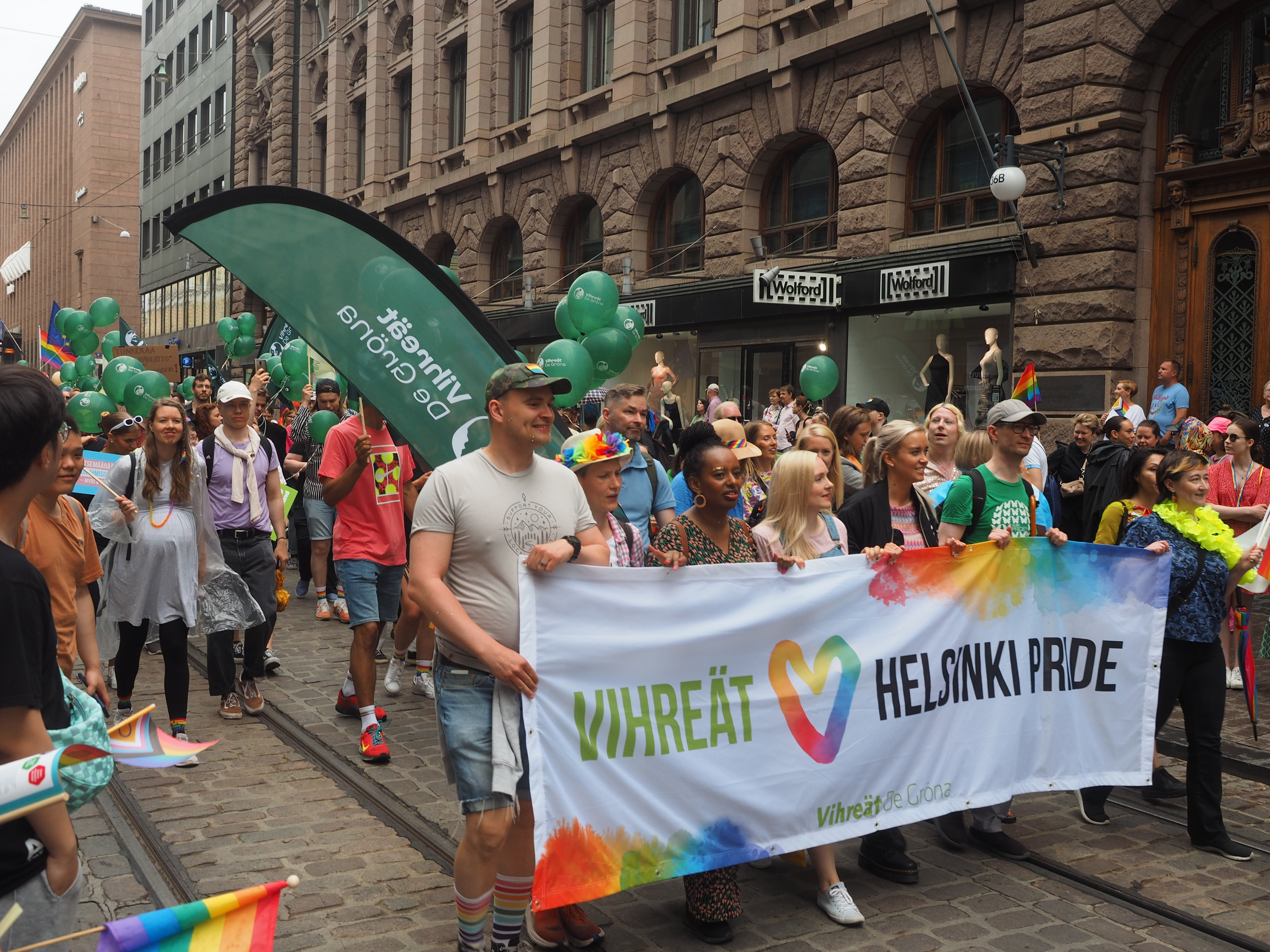
Members of the Finnish Green League party at the Helsinki Pride 2023 parade.

The Green League is no longer a protest party, nor an alternative movement. Some Green candidates reject classifying the party as either left-wing or right-wing. Economic opinions of the members range between left and right. However, members of the party on average place their party left of the Social Democratic Party and right of the Left Alliance.

The party is one of the strongest proponents for same-sex marriage. The party is also distinct in its opposition against universal male conscription and wants to opt for a gender-neutral, selective version. The eventual goal of the Greens is voluntary military service.

In 2015, the party included universal basic income (UBI) as a proposal in their platform. In February 2019, the party announced that it wanted to introduce a €300 universal basic income in the 2019 to 2023 parliamentary term, before transitioning to a €600 tax-free UBI during the following 2023 to 2027 parliamentary term.

In the spring of 2018, the party proposed lowering the voting age to 15.

The party stated in December 2018 that it supports investing €10 billion in Finland's railway infrastructure and improving rail connections in the country, including building high-speed rail connections.

In September 2021, the party voted to pass an internal motion supporting the legalisation and regulation of cannabis in Finland. It thus became the first party in Finland's Parliament to publicly state support for cannabis being legalised in the country.

As of 2022, the party is in favour of nuclear power.

In 2023, the party was described by Al Jazeera as, "environmentalists that prioritise welfare and equality".

The party is pro-EU and supports Finland's NATO membership.

== Election results ==
=== Parliamentary elections ===
Election	Votes	%	Seats	+/-	Government
1983	43,754	1.47	2 / 200		Opposition
1987	115,988	4.03	4 / 200	▲2	Opposition
1991	185,894	6.82	10 / 200	▲6	Opposition
1995	181,198	6.52	9 / 200	▼1	Coalition
1999	194,846	7.27	11 / 200	▲2	Coalition (1999–2002)
1999	194,846	7.27	11 / 200	▲2	Opposition (2002–2003)
2003	223,846	8.01	14 / 200	▲3	Opposition
2007	234,429	8.46	15 / 200	▲1	Coalition
2011	213,172	7.25	10 / 200	▼5	Coalition (2011–2014)
2011	213,172	7.25	10 / 200	▼5	Opposition (2014–2015)
2015	253,102	8.53	15 / 200	▲5	Opposition
2019	354,194	11.49	20 / 200	▲5	Coalition
2023	217,426	7.03	13 / 200	▼7	Opposition

=== Municipal elections ===
Election	Councillors	Votes	%
1984	101	76,441	2.8
1988	94	61,581	2.3
1992	343	184,787	6.9
1996	292	149,334	6.3
2000	338	171,707	7.7
2004	313	175,933	7.4
2008	370	228,277	8.9
2012	323	213,100	8.5
2017	534	320,235	12.5
2021	433	259,104	10.6
2025	418	254,172	10.5

=== European Parliament elections ===
Election	Votes	%	Seats	+/–	EP Group
1996	170,670	7.59 (#5)	1 / 16	New	G
1999	166,786	13.43 (#4)	2 / 16	▲1	G/EFA
2004	172,844	10.43 (#4)	1 / 14	▼1	G/EFA
2009	206,439	12.40 (#4)	2 / 13	▲1	G/EFA
2014	160,967	9.33 (#5)	1 / 13	▼1	G/EFA
2019	292,892	16.00 (#2)	3 / 14	▲2	G/EFA
2024	206,332	11.28 (#5)	2 / 15	▼1	G/EFA

=== Presidential elections ===
Parliamentarian and former MEP Heidi Hautala was a candidate in the presidential elections in 2000 and 2006, taking approximately a 3.5% share of votes in the first round in each. Pekka Haavisto was the first Green candidate in the 2012 election to enter the second round. Haavisto got an 18.8% share of votes in the first round, and lost to centre-right Sauli Niinistö in the second round held on 5 February.

Election	Candidate	1st round		2nd round		Result
Election	Candidate	Votes	%	Votes	%	Result
2000	Heidi Hautala	100,740	3.29 (#5)			Lost
2006	Heidi Hautala	105,248	3.49 (#4)			Lost
2012	Pekka Haavisto	574,275	18.76 (#2)	1,077,425	37.41 (#2)	Lost
2018	Pekka Haavisto	370,823	12.40 (#2)			Lost
2024	Pekka Haavisto (Note: Formally ran as independent.)	836,357	25.80 (#2)	1,476,548	48.38 (#2)	Lost

== Politicians ==
=== List of party chairpersons ===
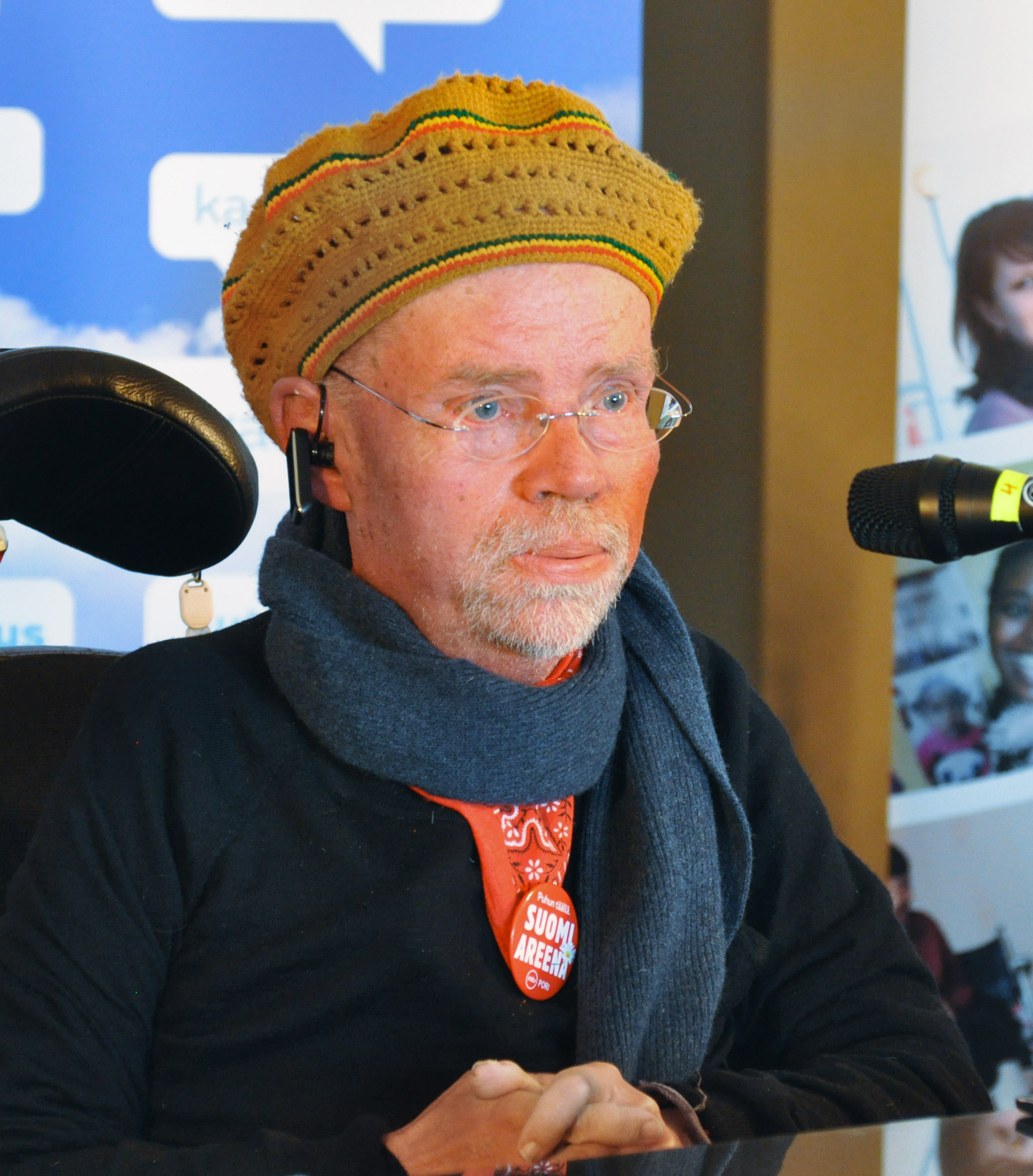
Kalle Könkkölä
(1987)

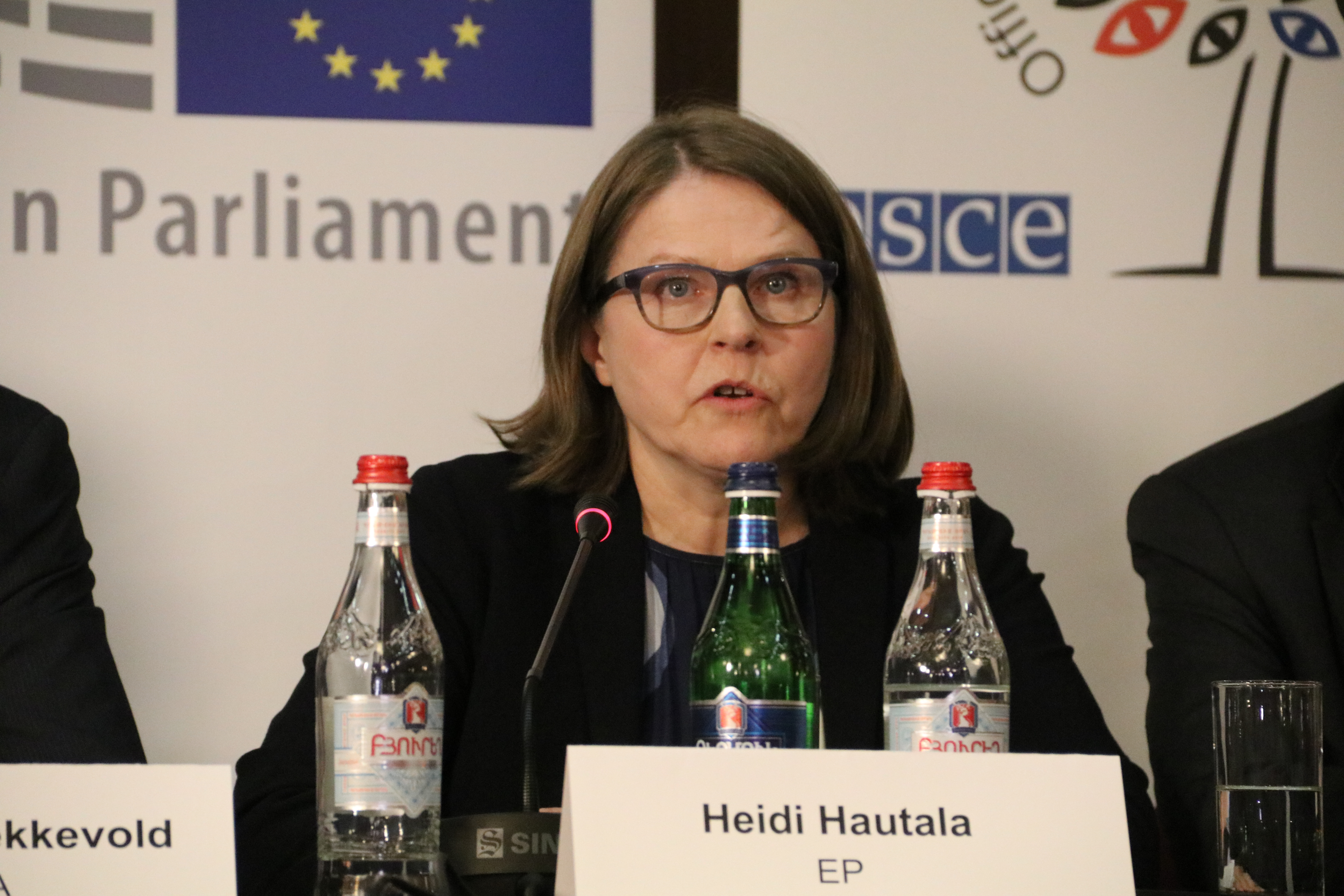
Heidi Hautala
(1987–1991)

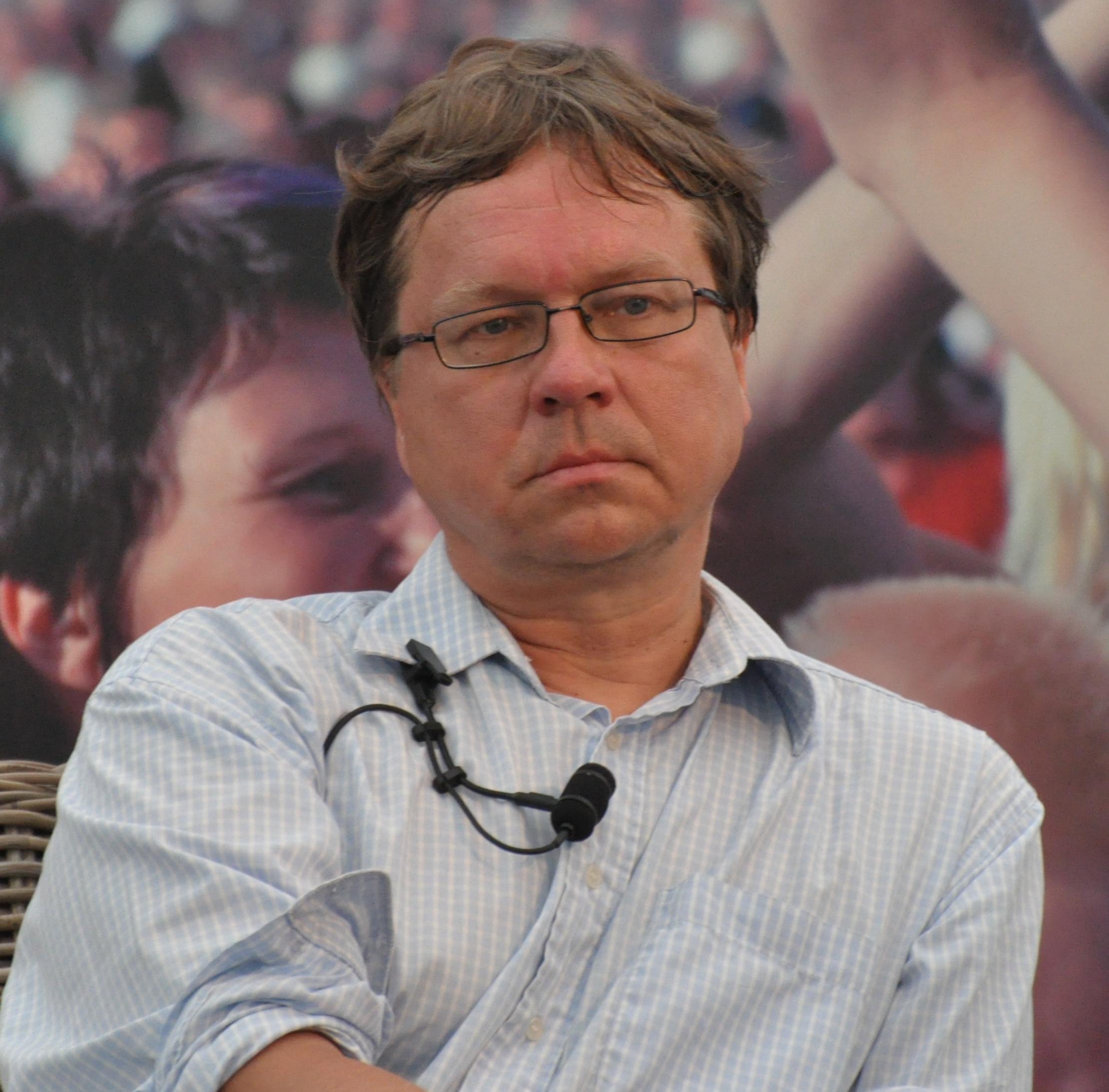
Pekka Sauri
(1991–1993)

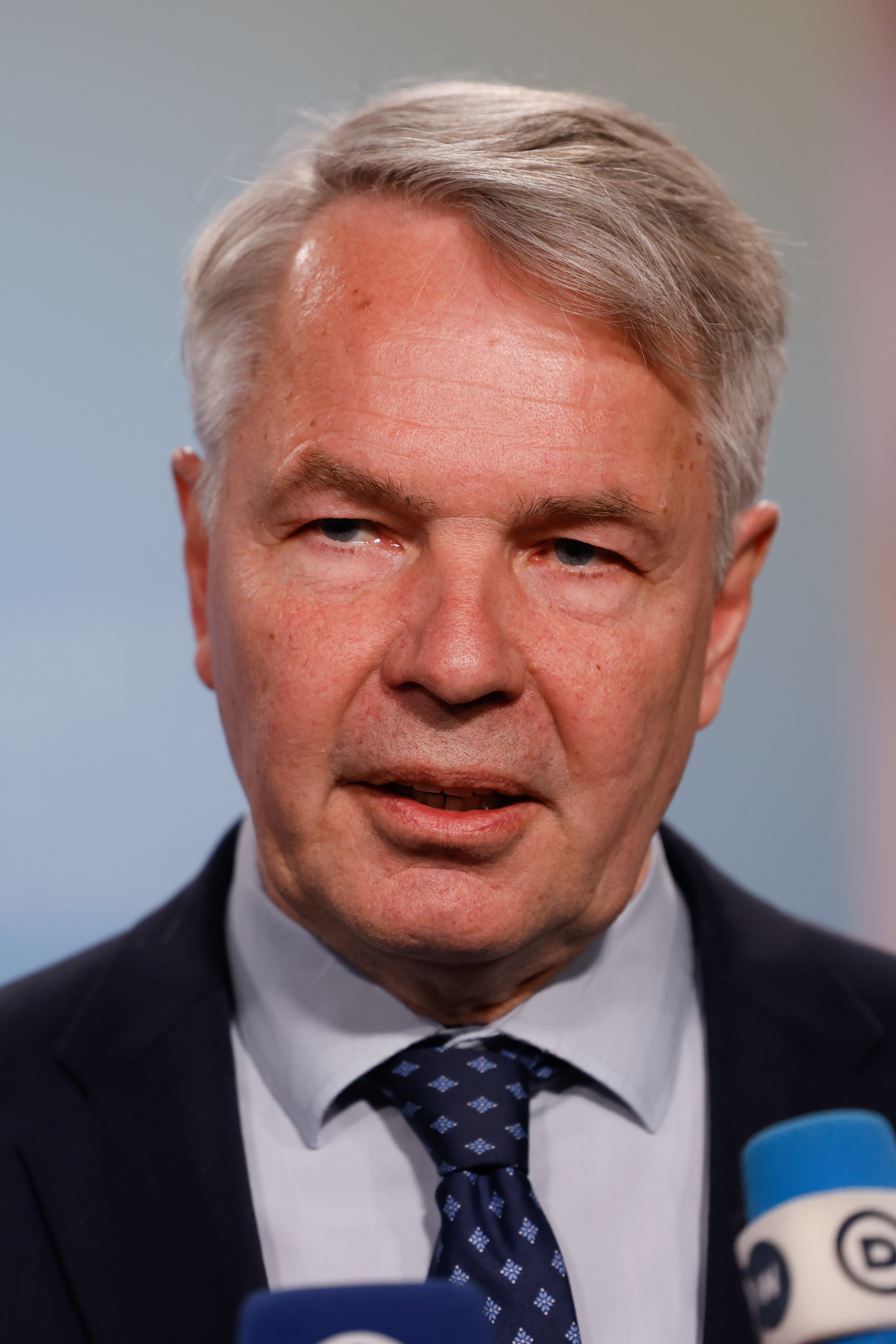
Pekka Haavisto
(1993–1995, 2018–2019)

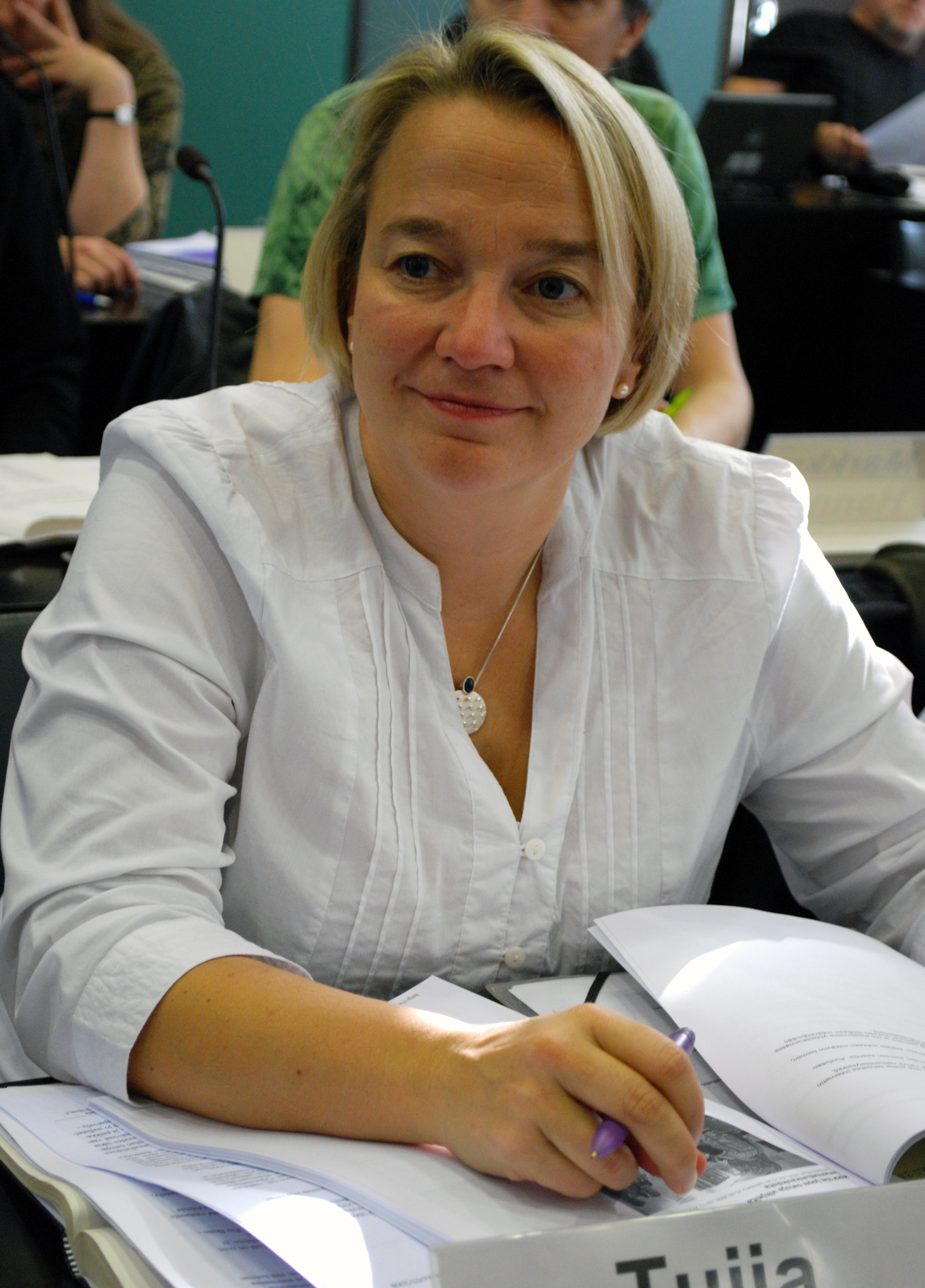
Tuija Brax
(1995–1997)

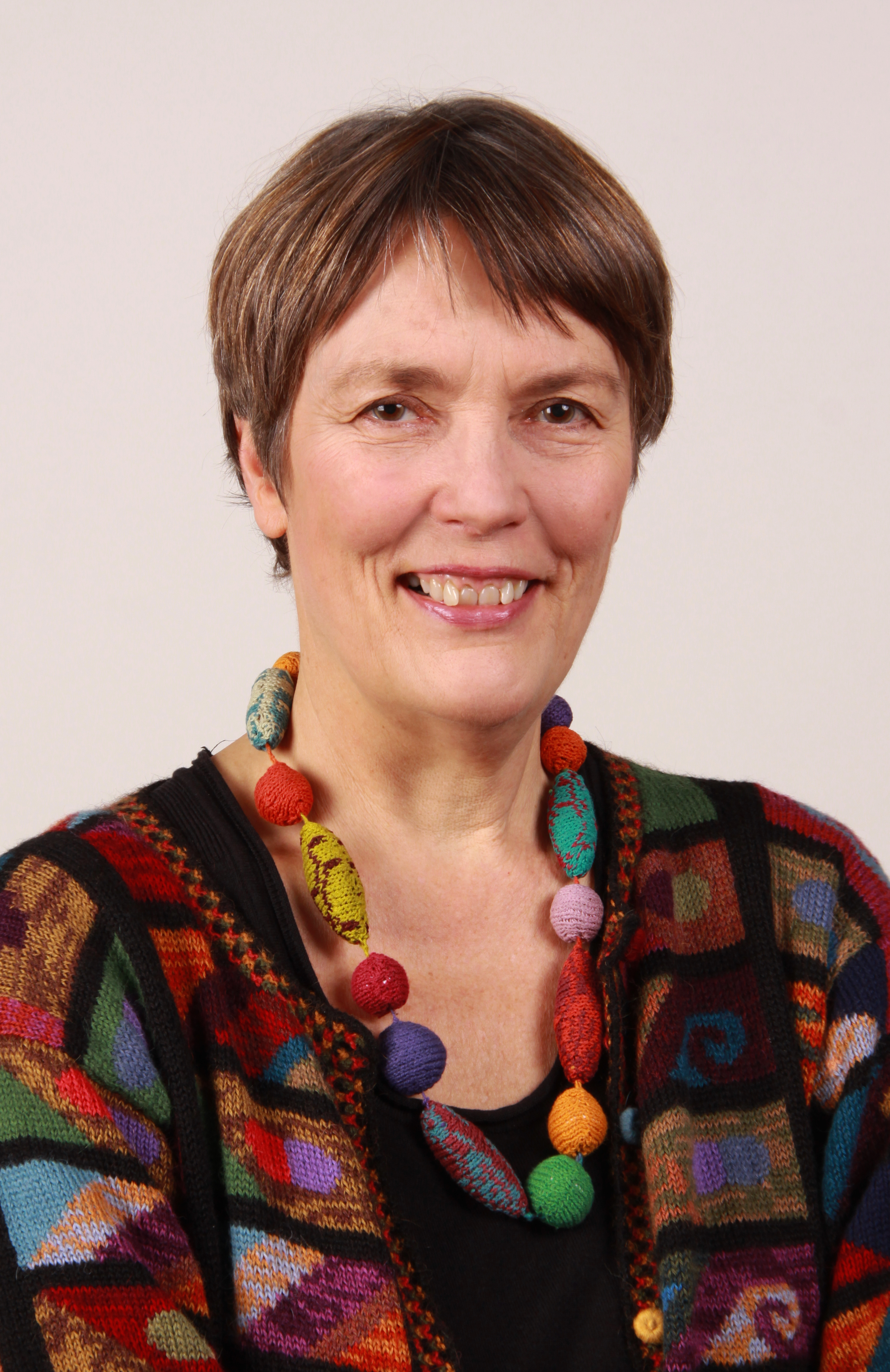
Satu Hassi
(1997–2001)

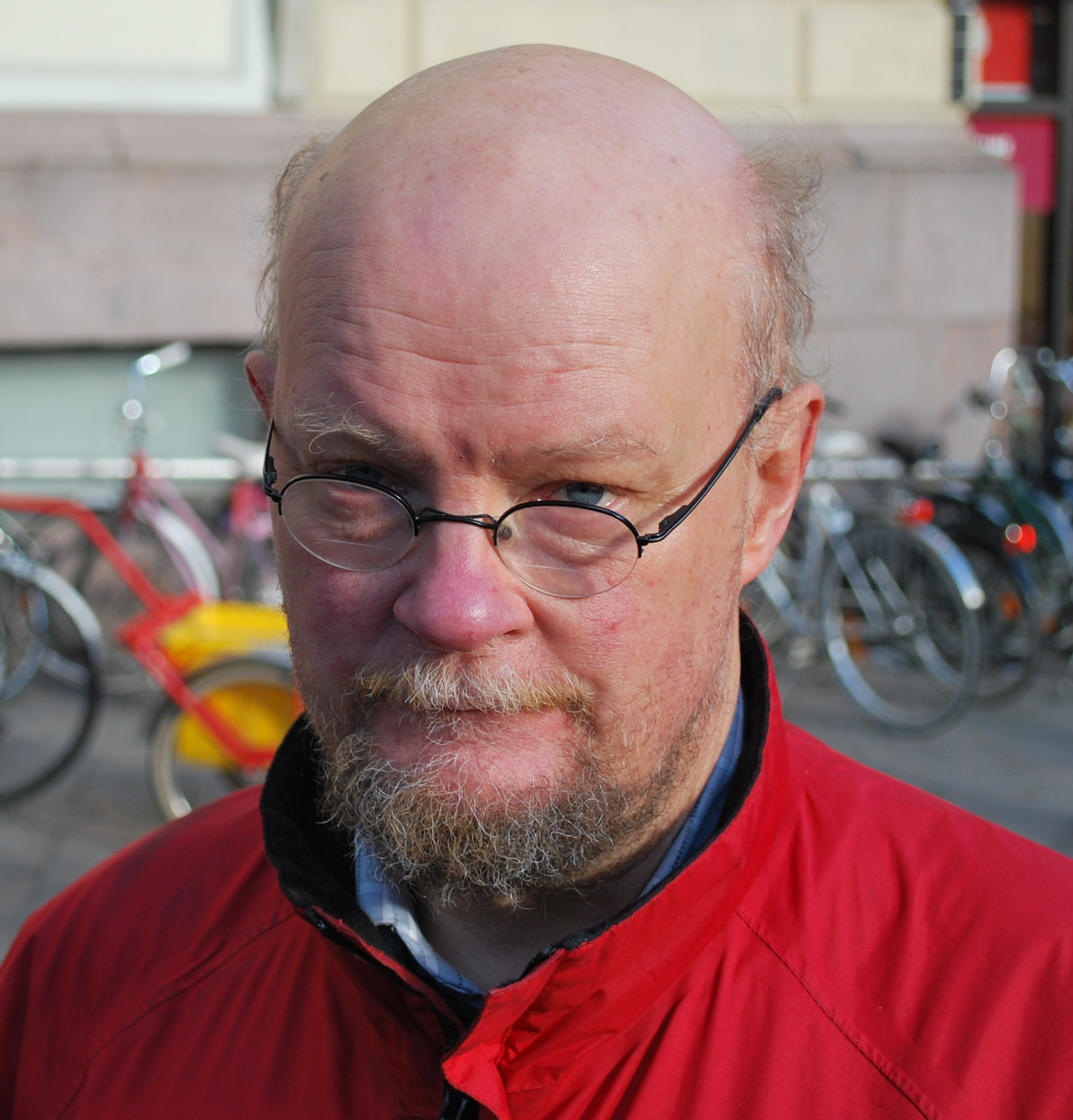
Osmo Soininvaara
(2001–2005)

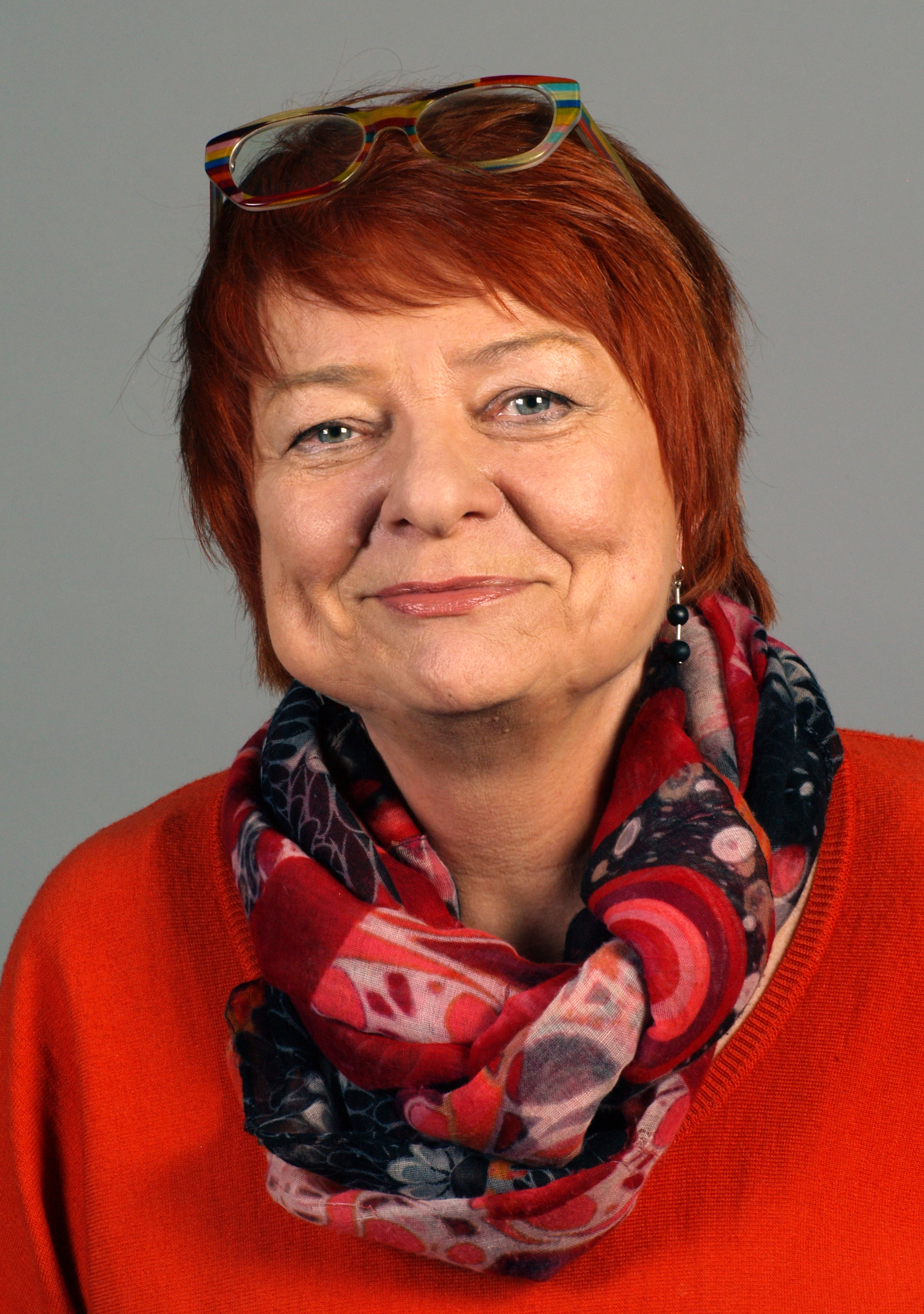
Tarja Cronberg
(2005–2009)

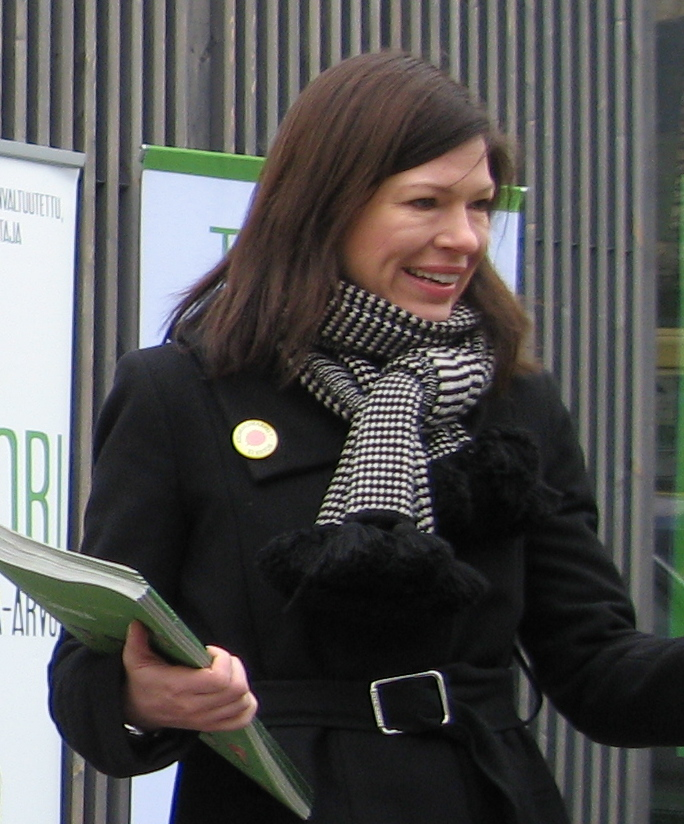
Anni Sinnemäki
(2009–2011)

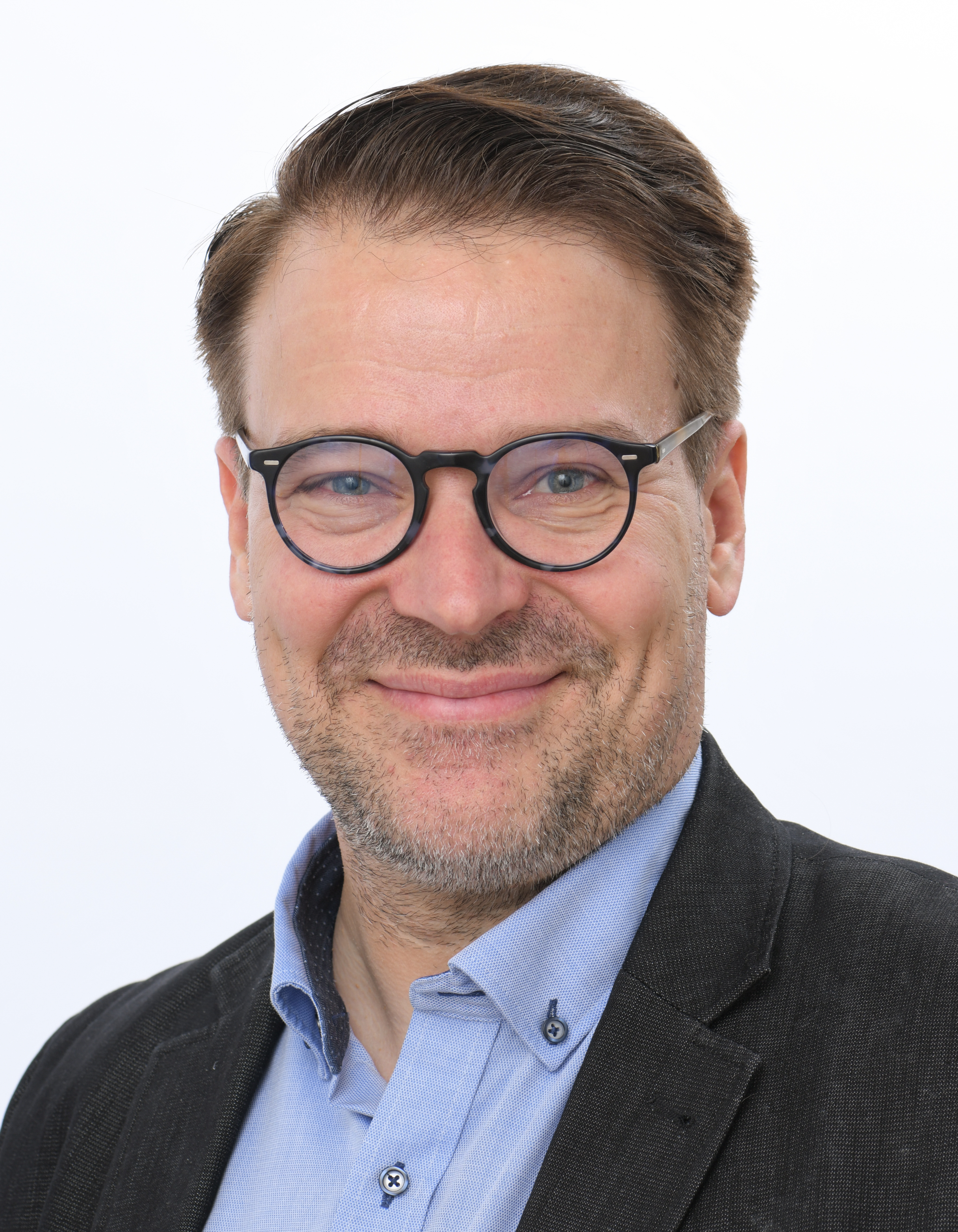
Ville Niinistö
(2011–2017)

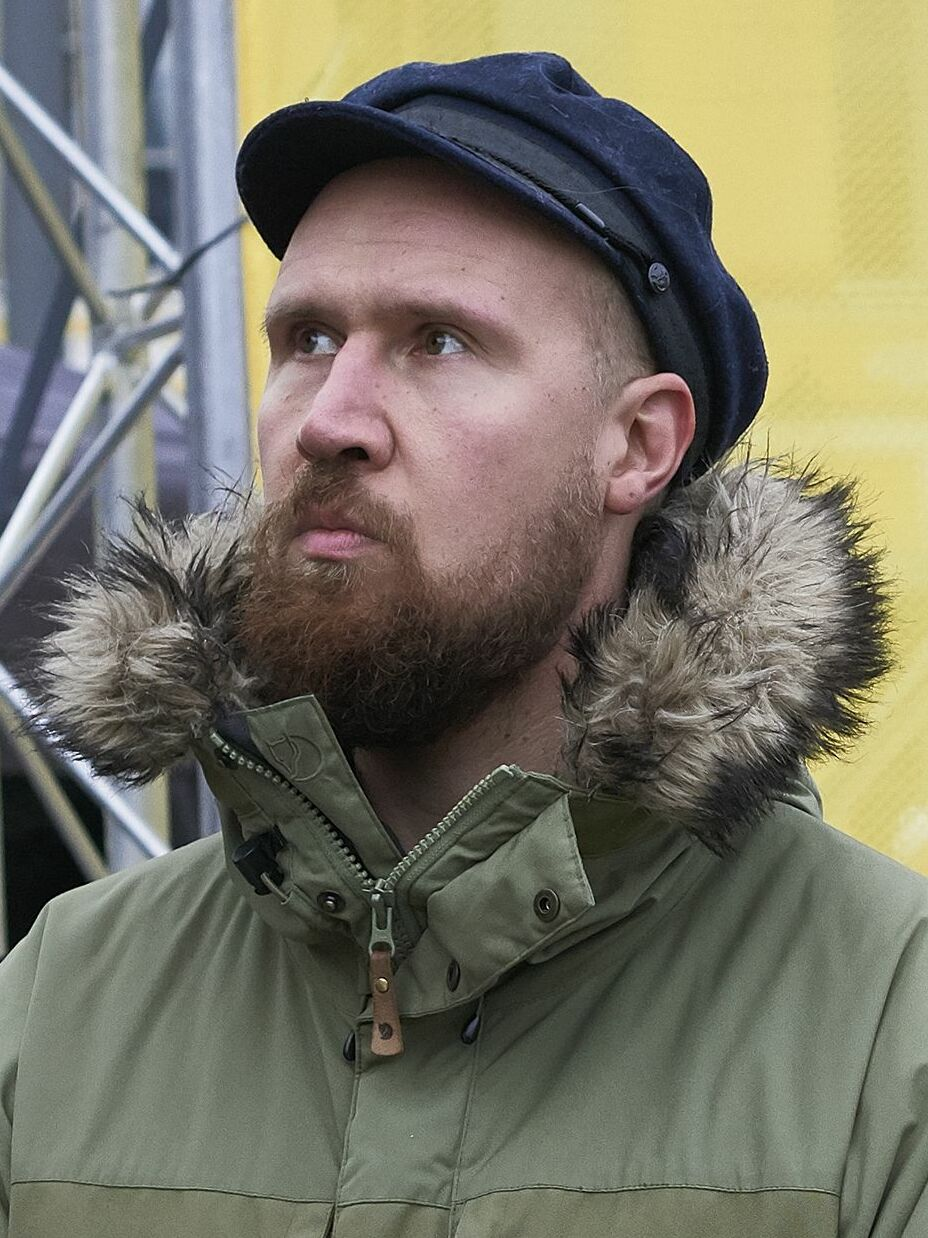
Touko Aalto
(2017–2018)

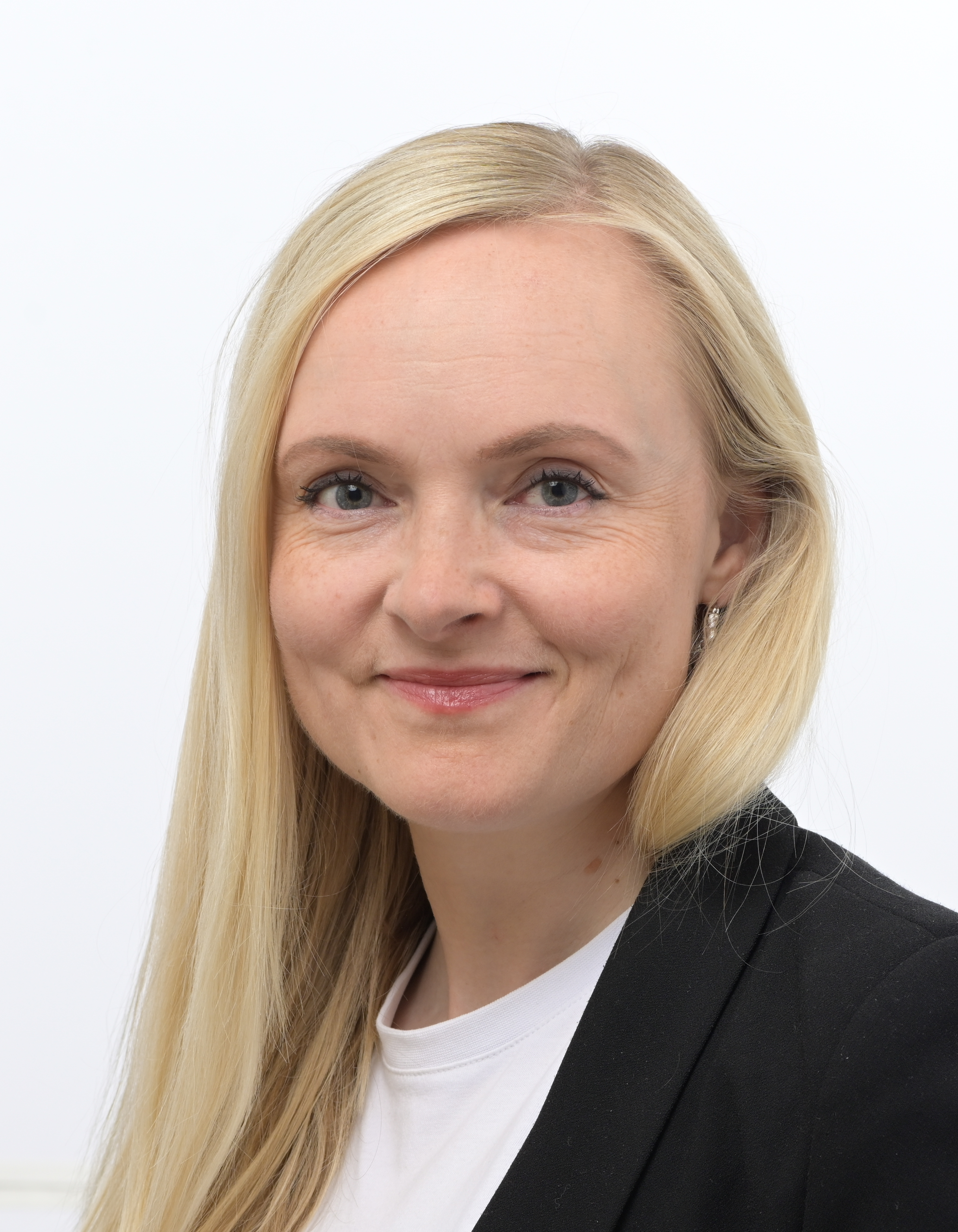
Maria Ohisalo
(2019–2023)

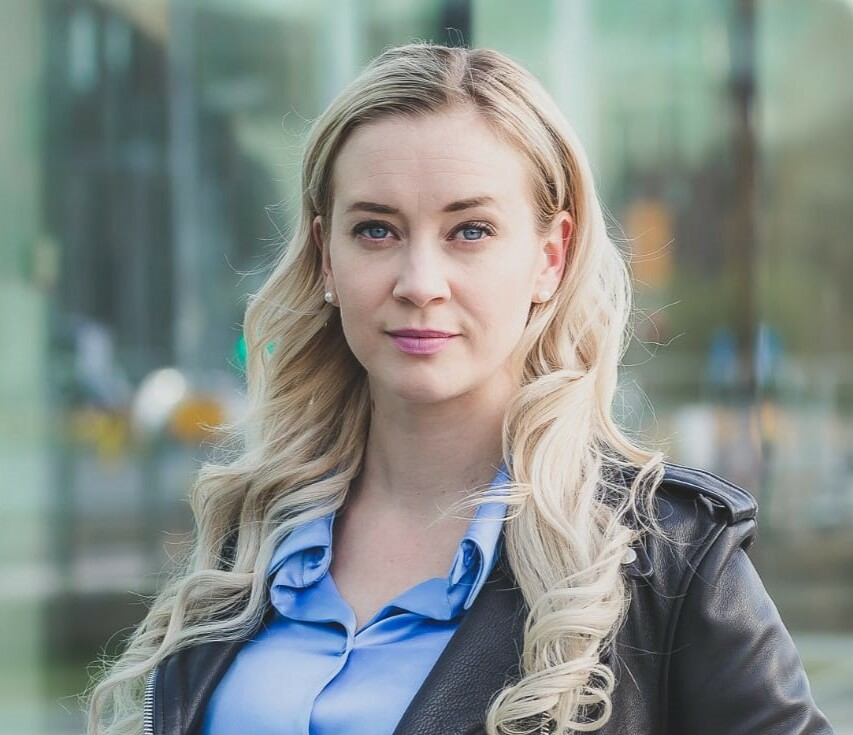
Sofia Virta
(2023–present)

=== Members of parliament from 2019–2023 ===
The following 20 Greens politicians were elected to the Finnish Parliament in the 2019 parliamentary election. 16 out of 20 members are first-timers. 17 of the members are women.

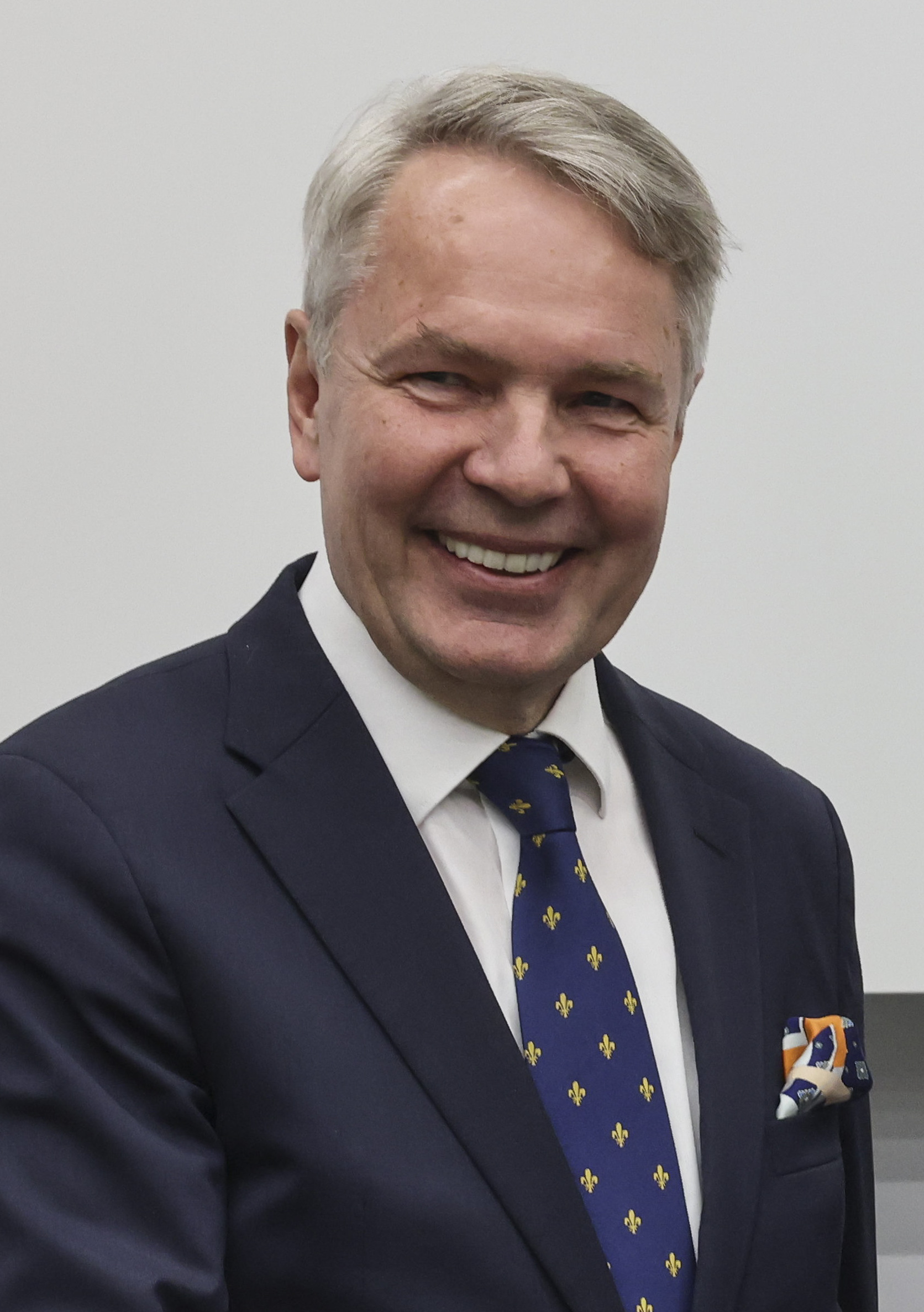
Pekka Haavisto
(Minister for Foreign Affairs)

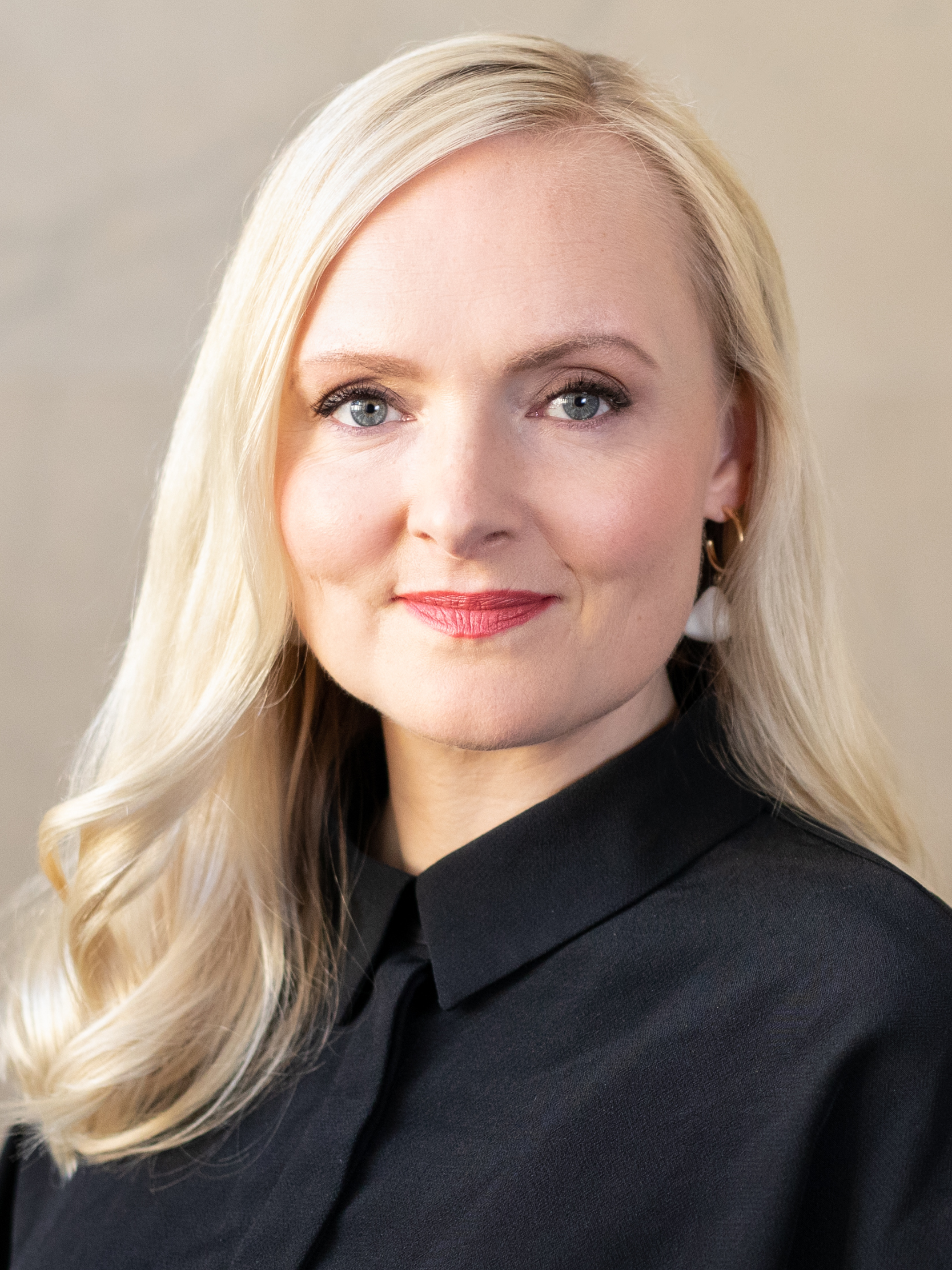
Maria Ohisalo
(Minister of the Interior)
(New)

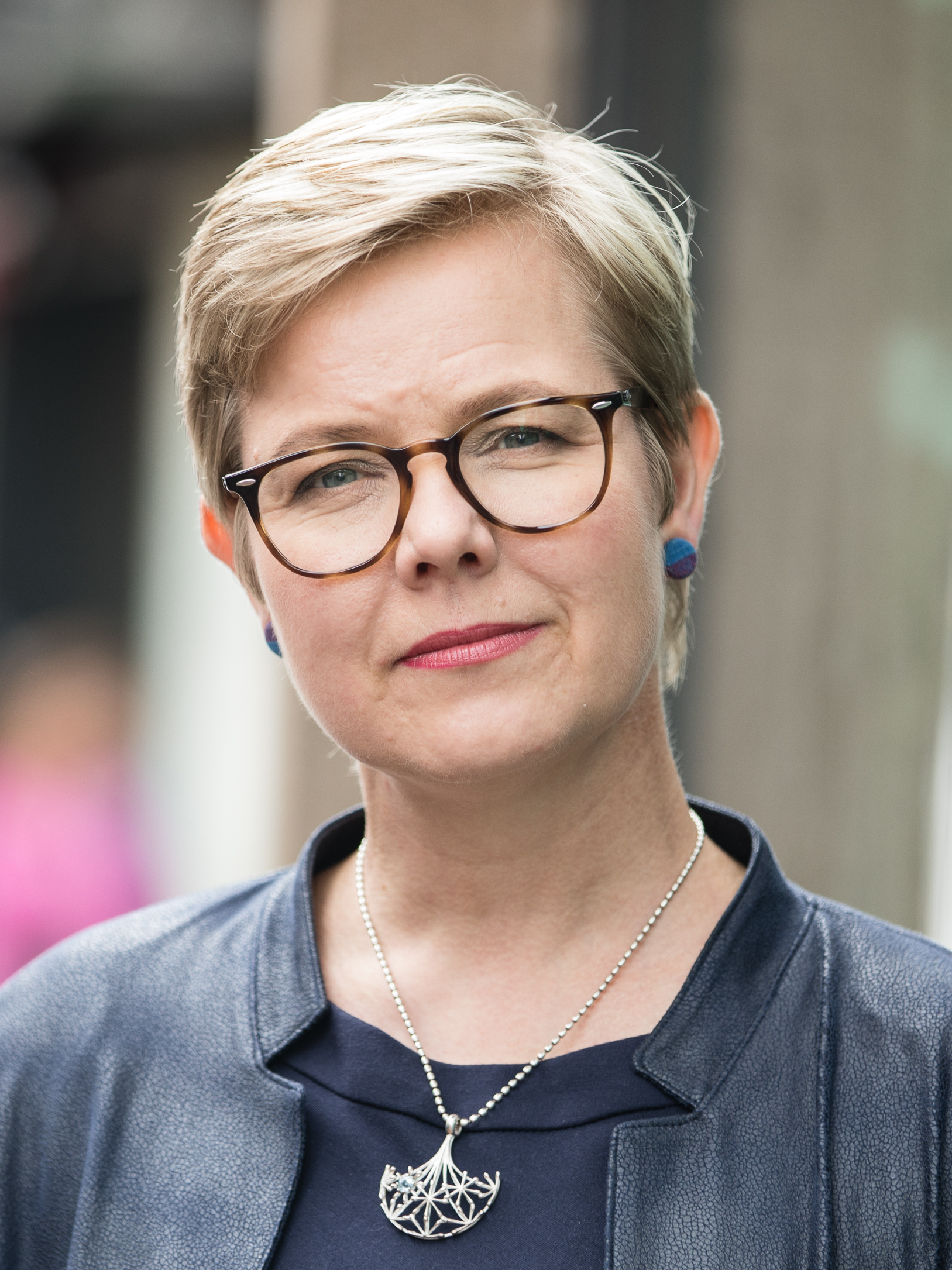
Krista Mikkonen
(Minister of the Environment and Climate Change)

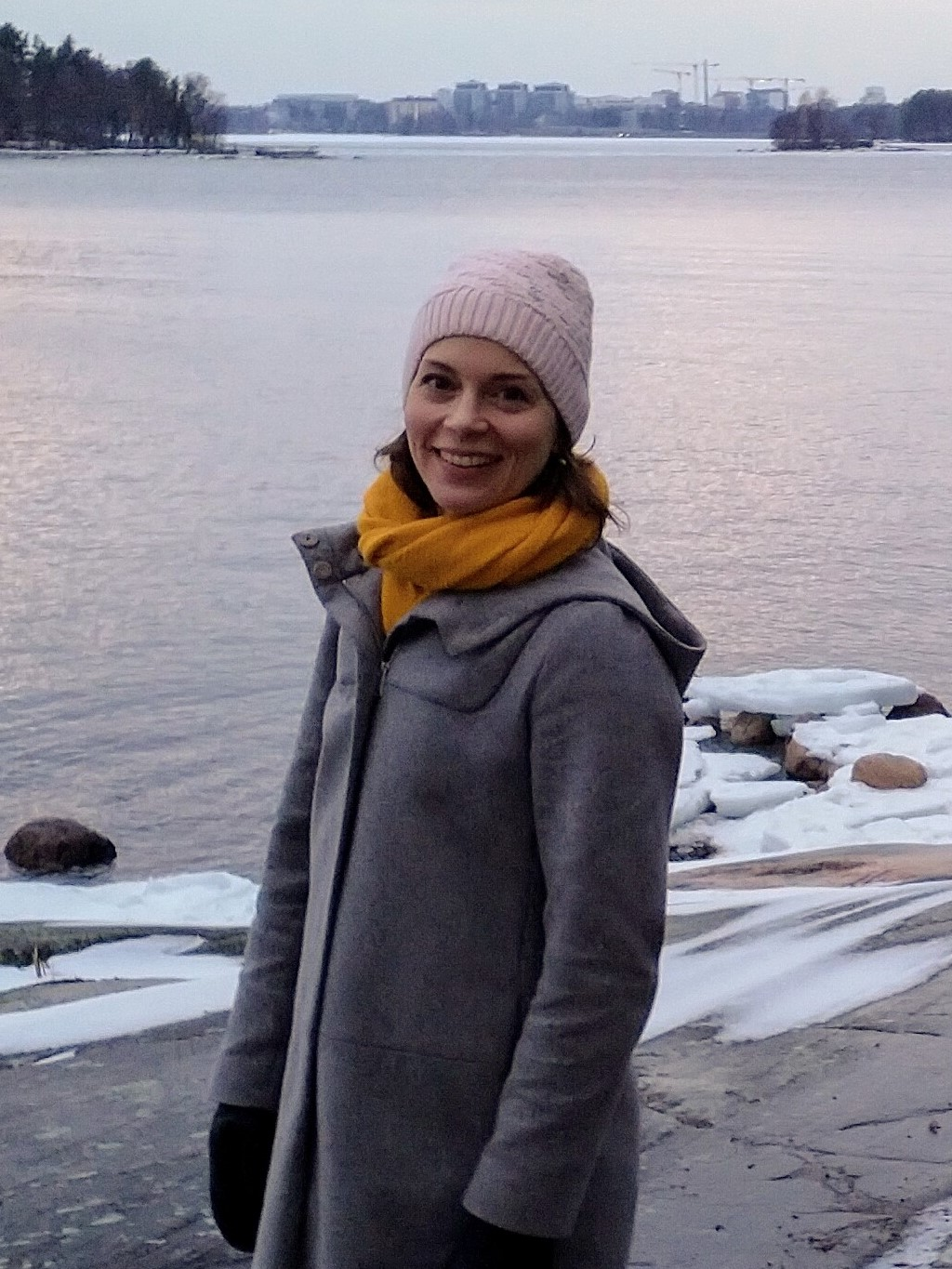
Mari Holopainen
(New)

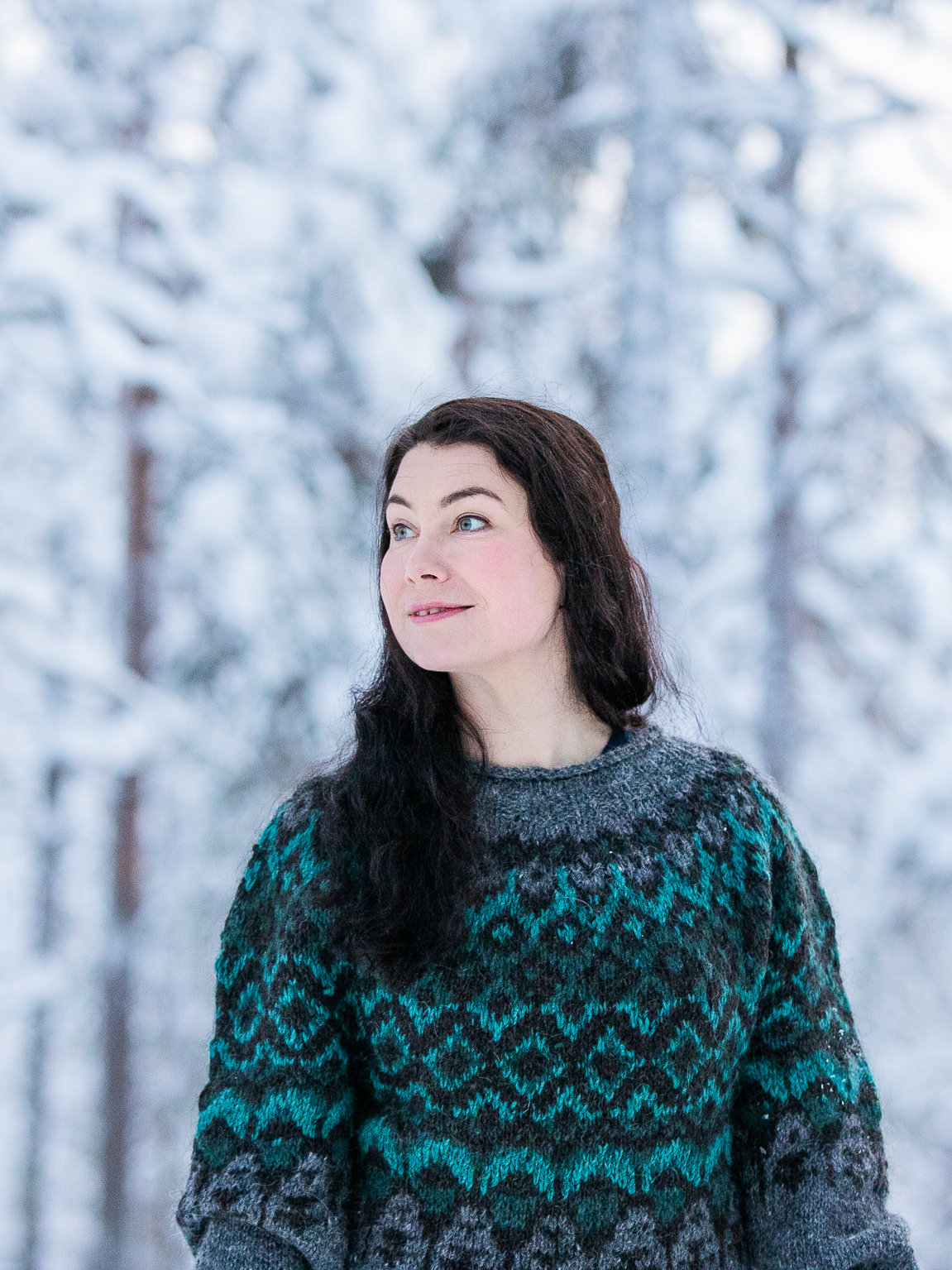
Emma Kari

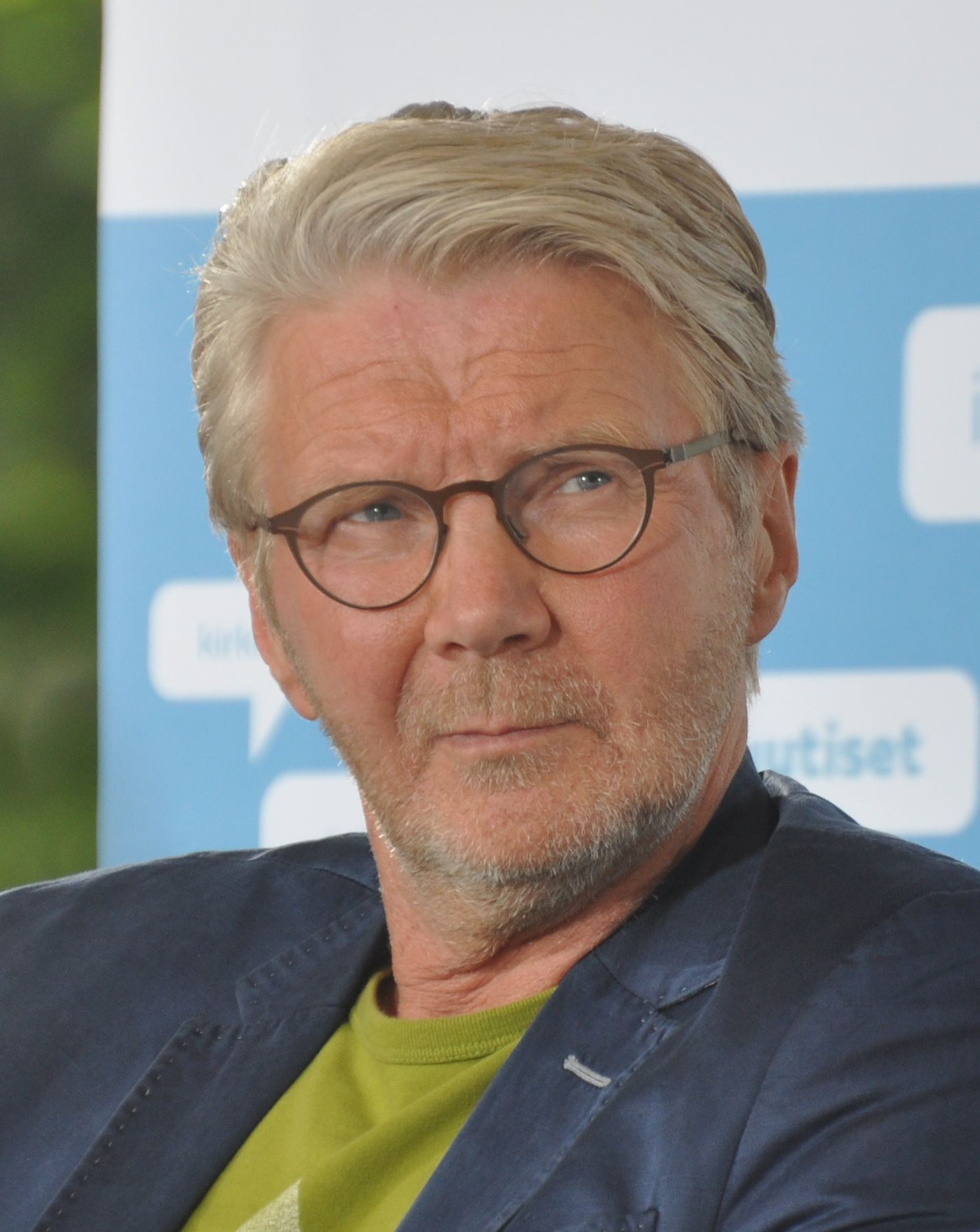
Pirkka-Pekka Petelius
(New)

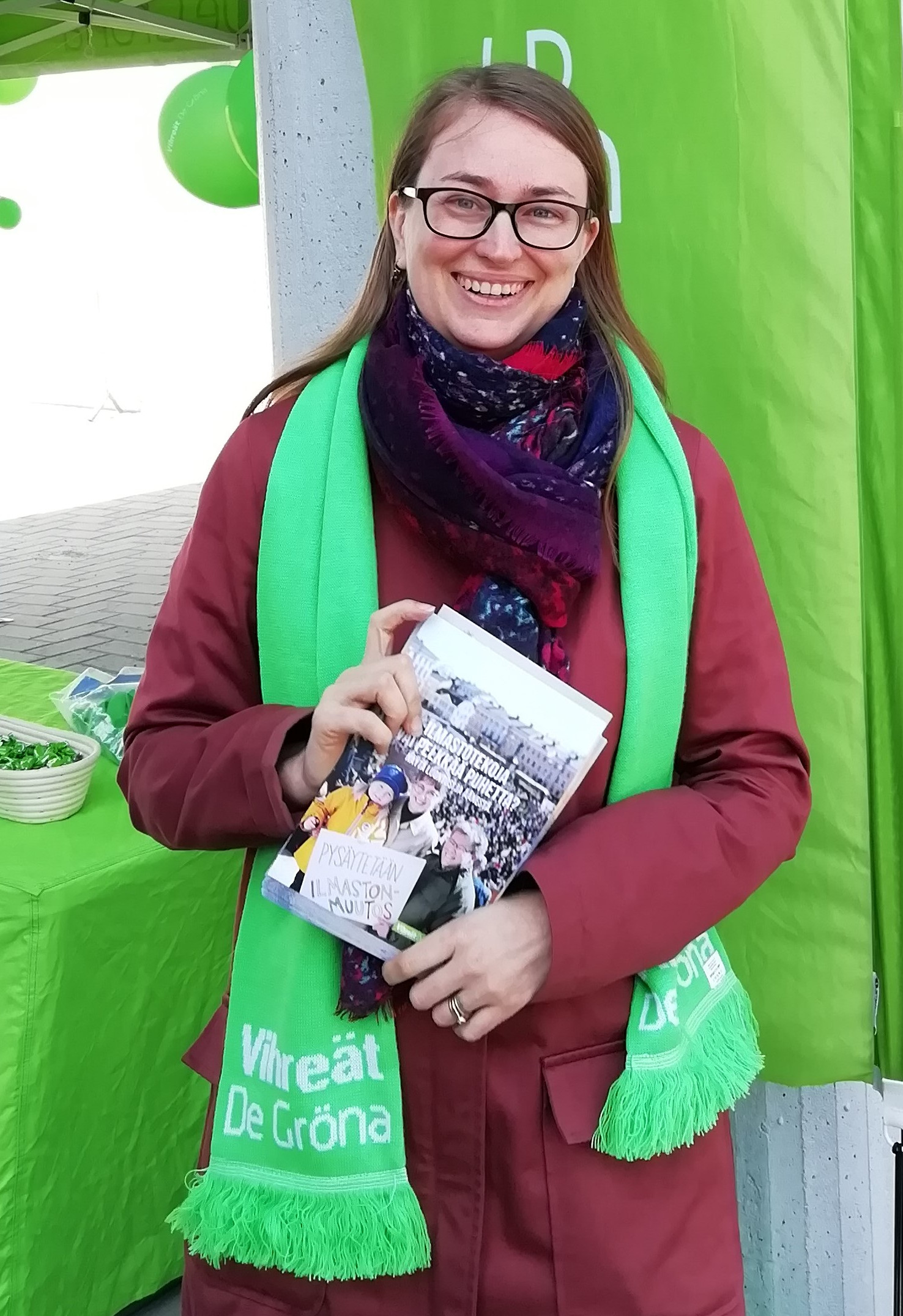
Inka Hopsu
(New)

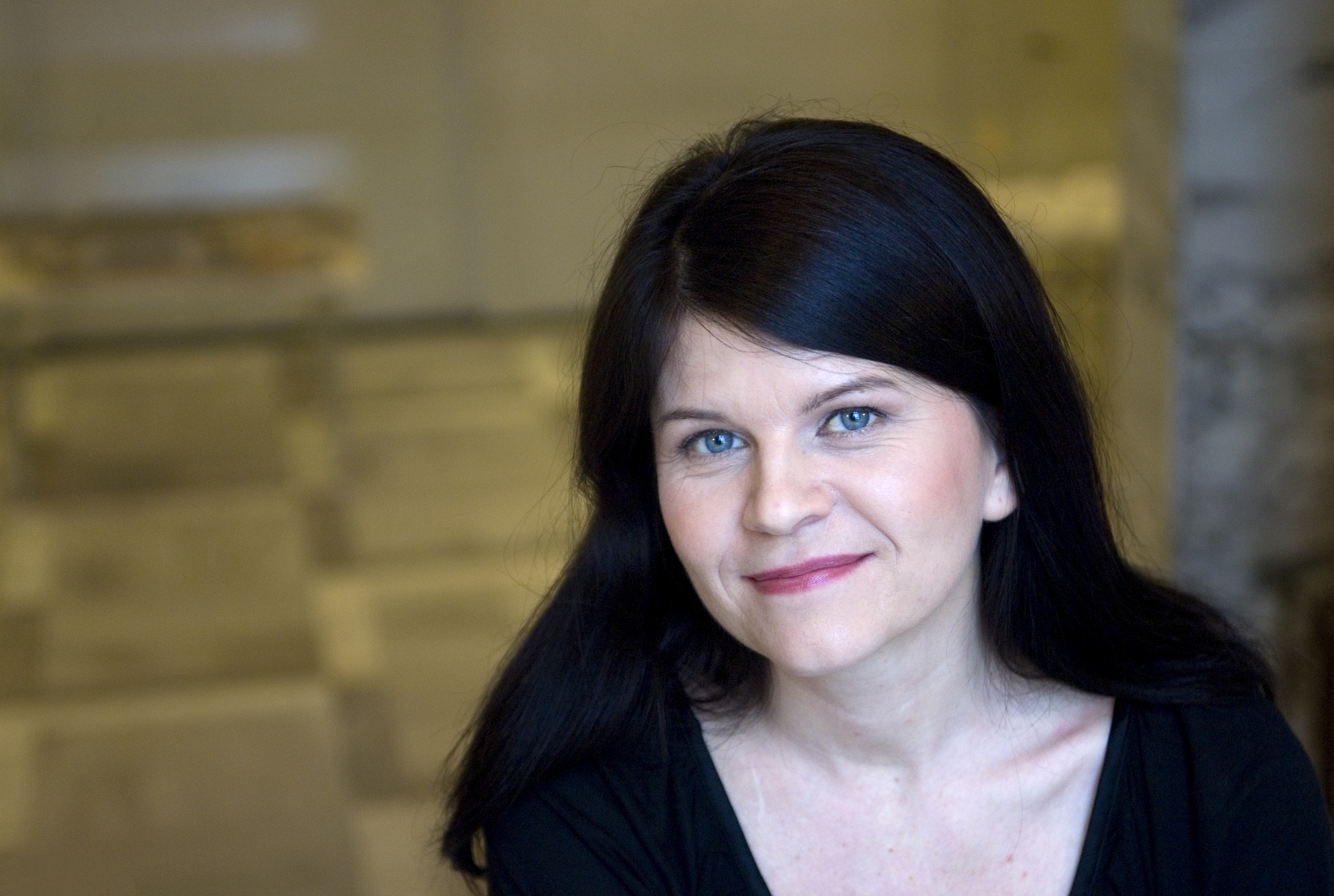
Outi Alanko-Kahiluoto

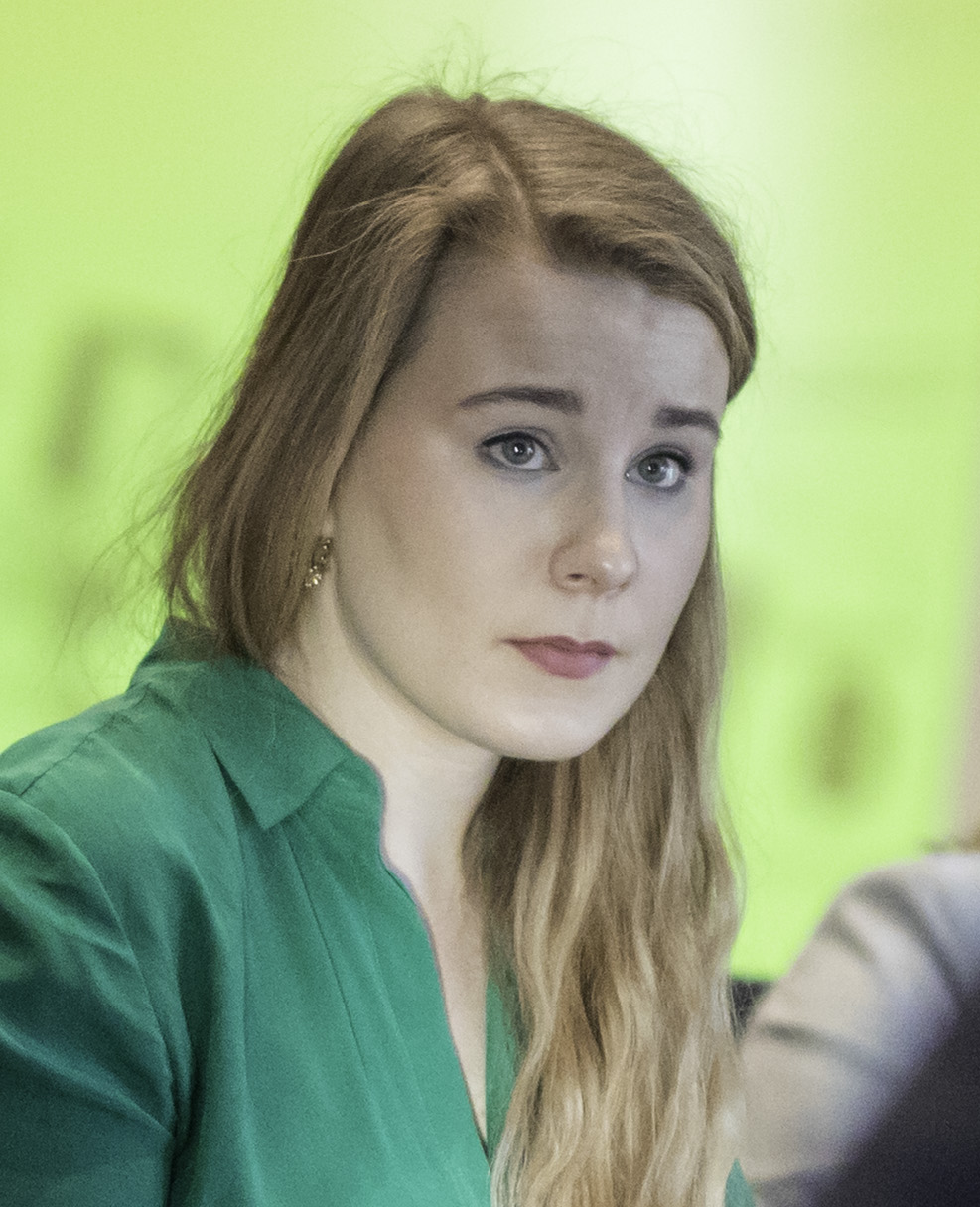
Iiris Suomela
(New)

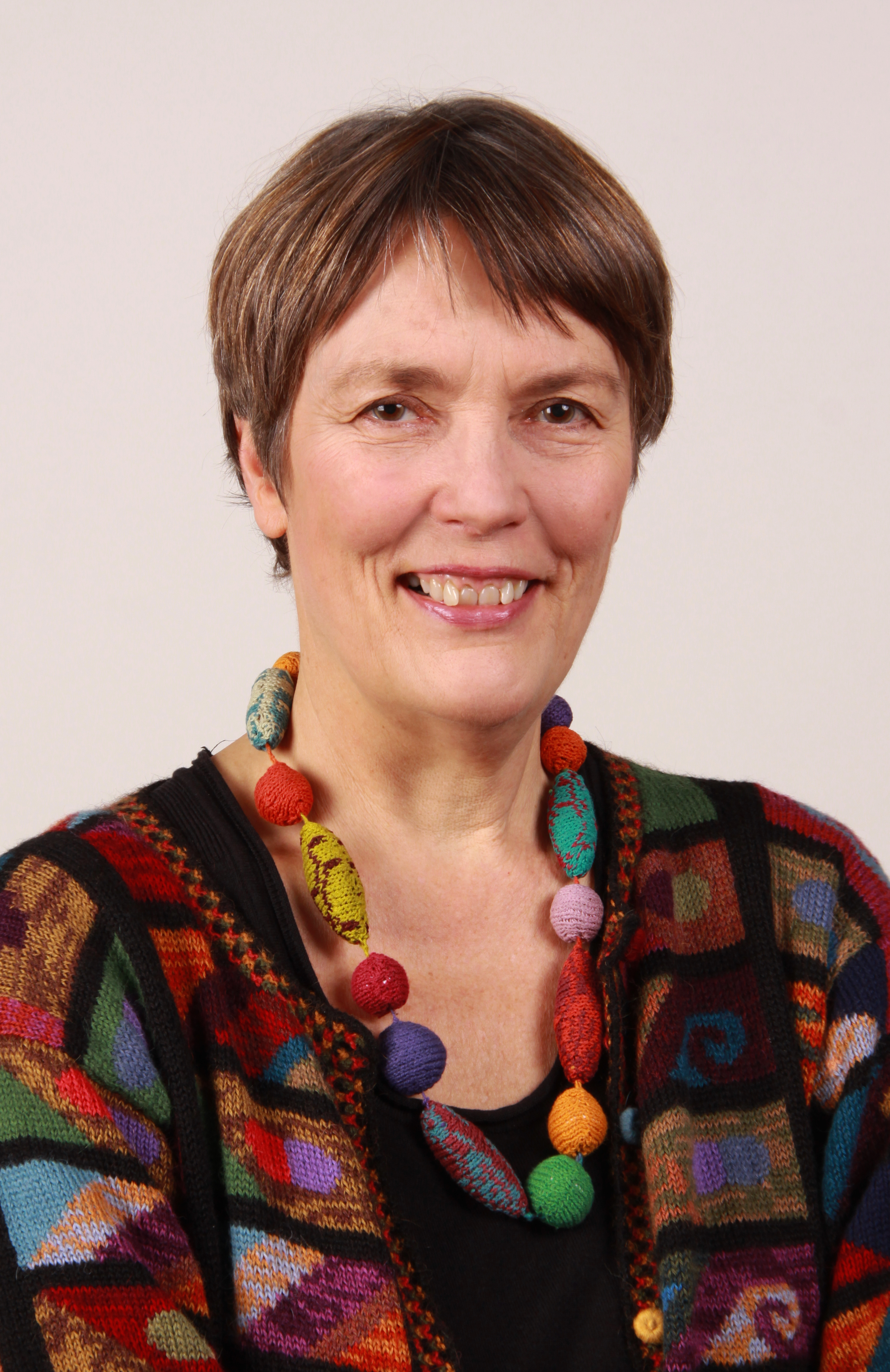
Satu Hassi

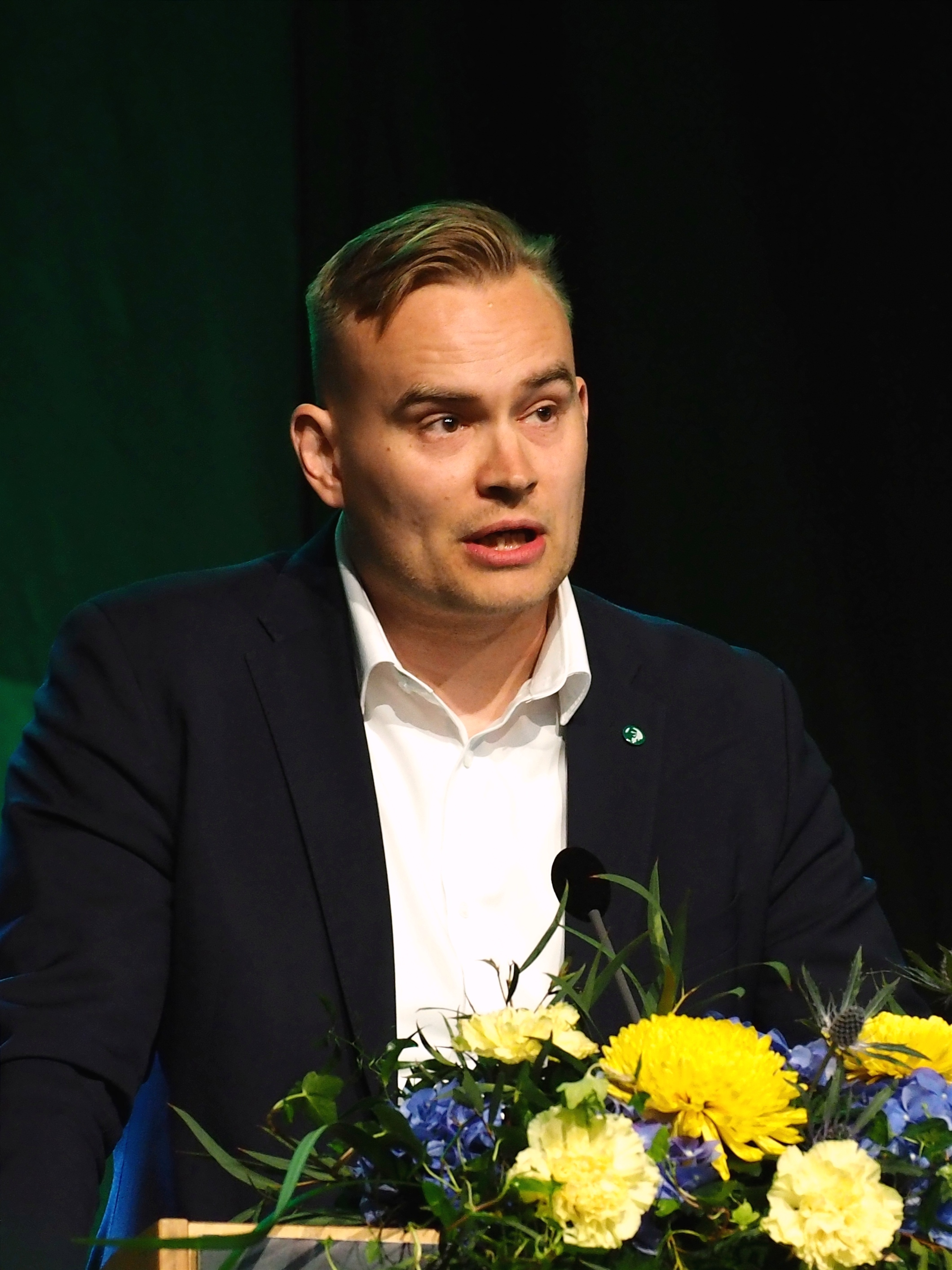
Atte Harjanne
(New)

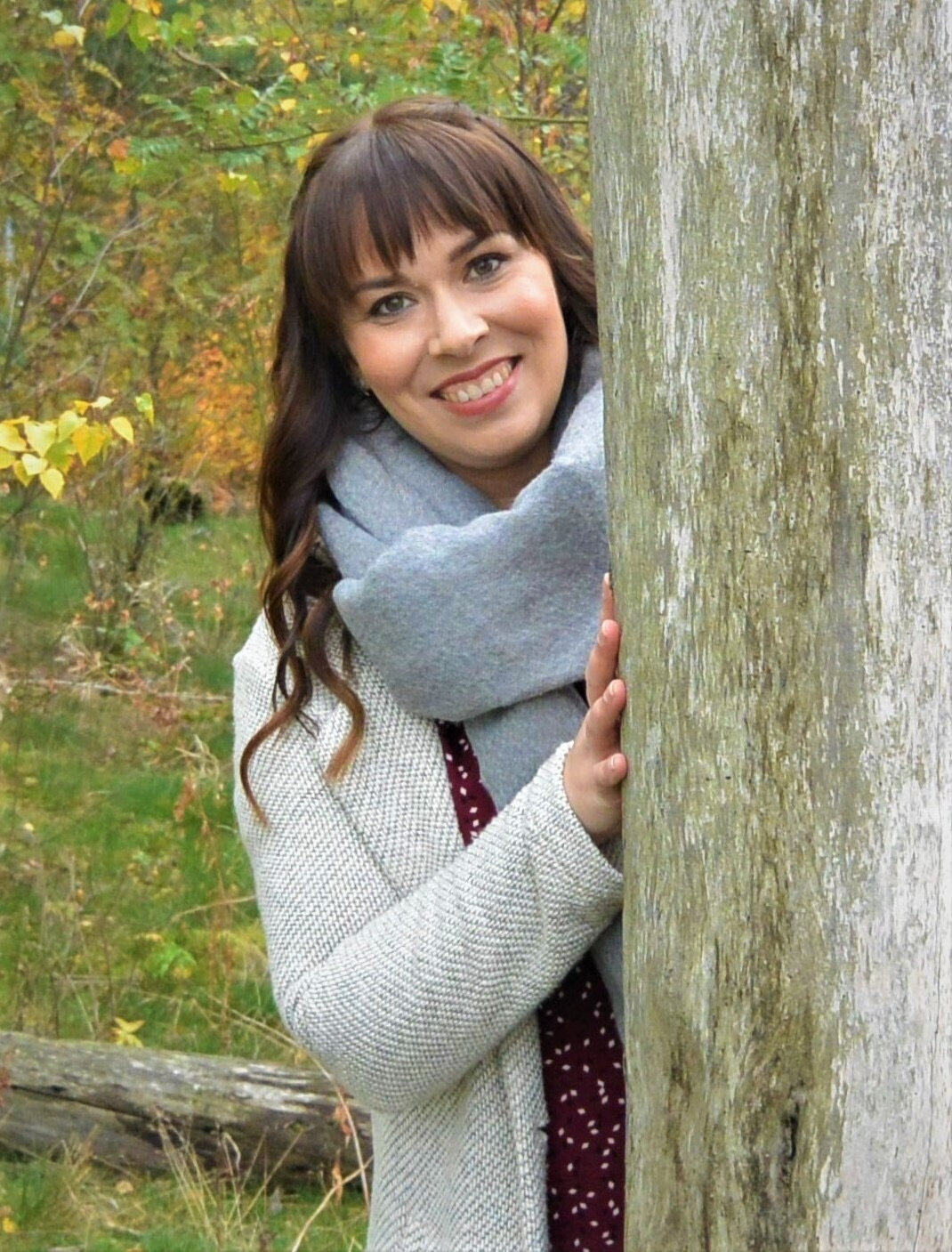
Noora Koponen
(New)

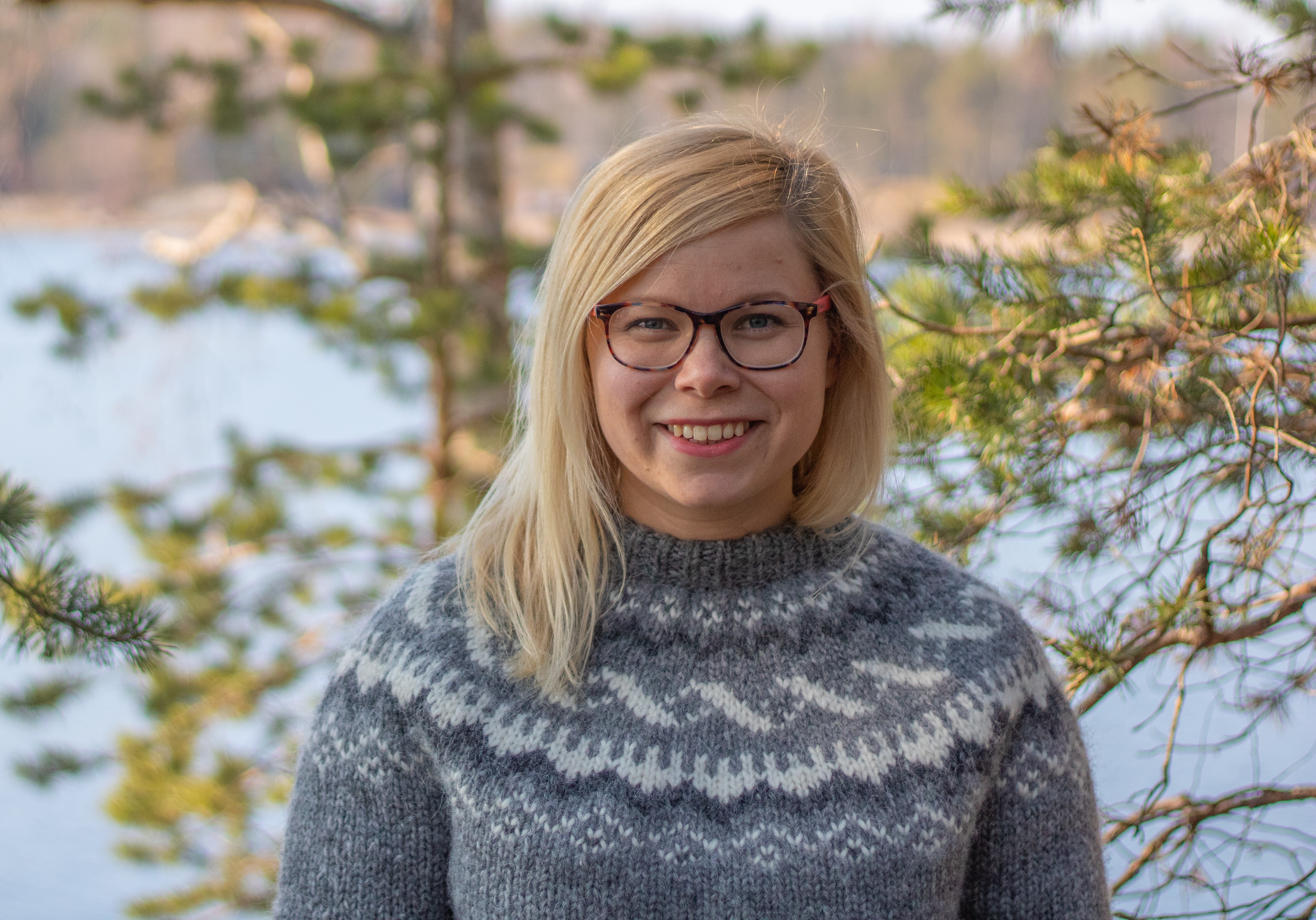
Saara Hyrkkö
(New)

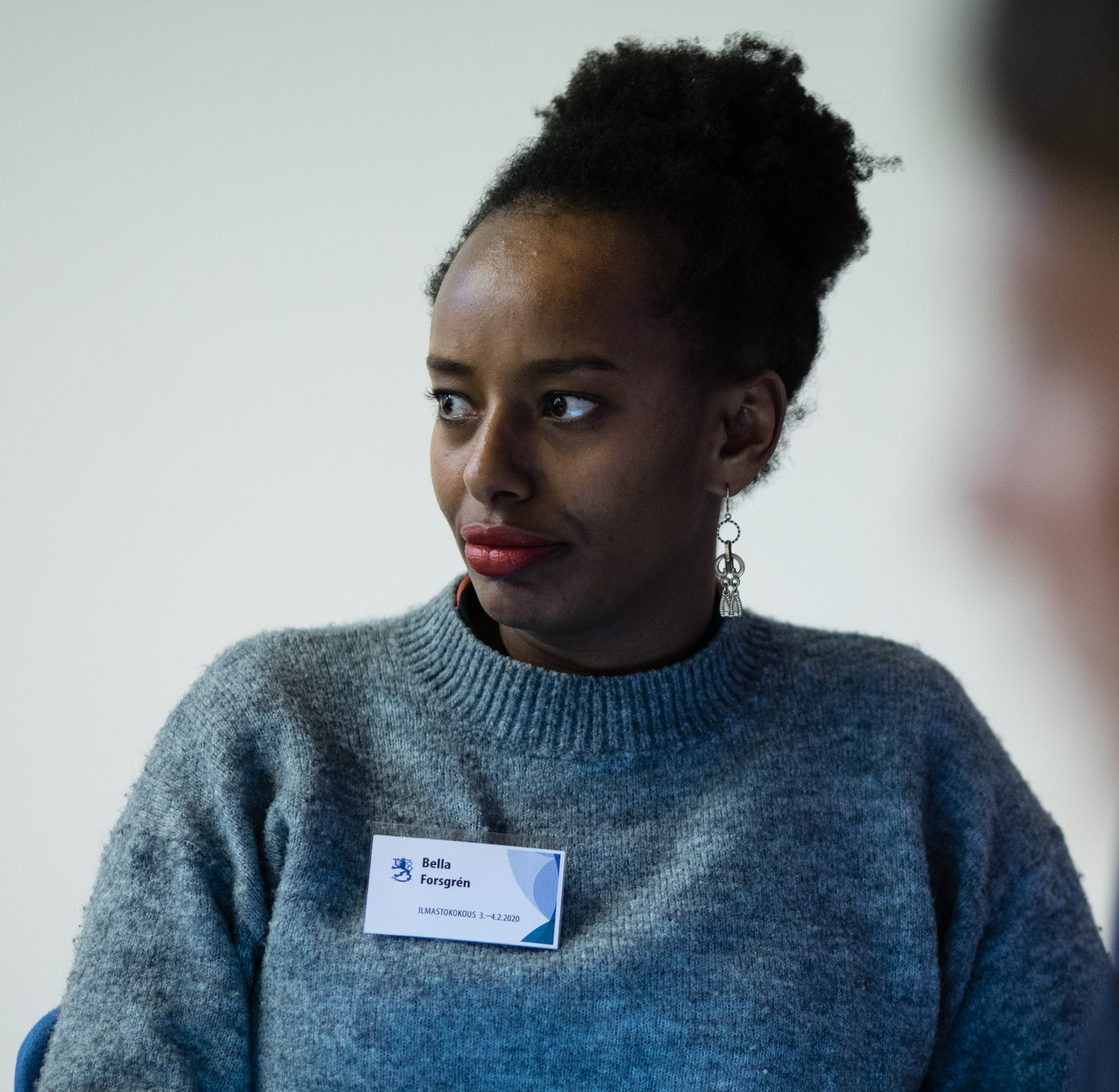
Bella Forsgrén
(New)

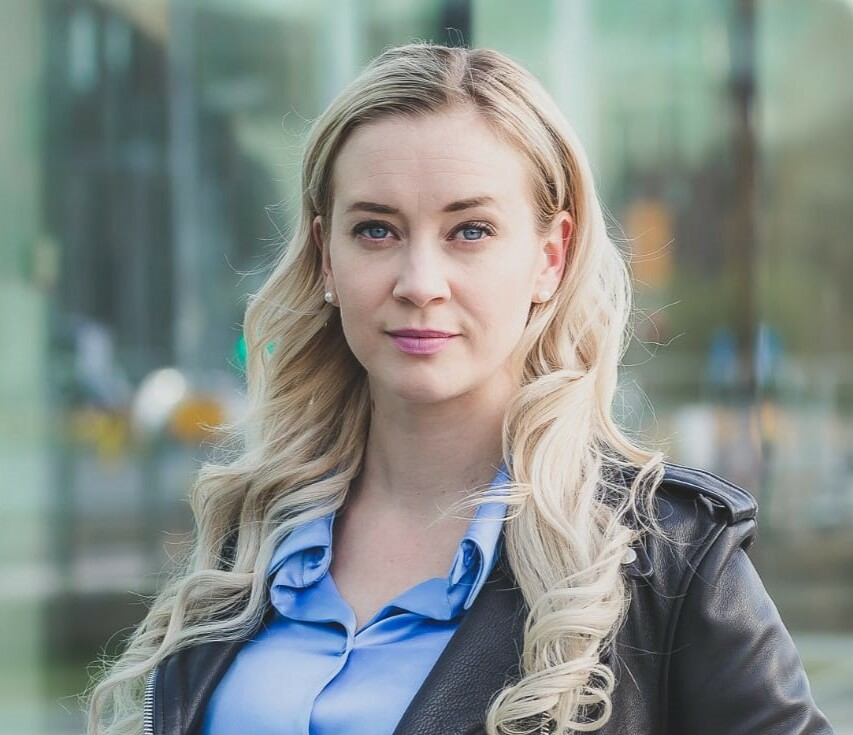
Sofia Virta
(New)

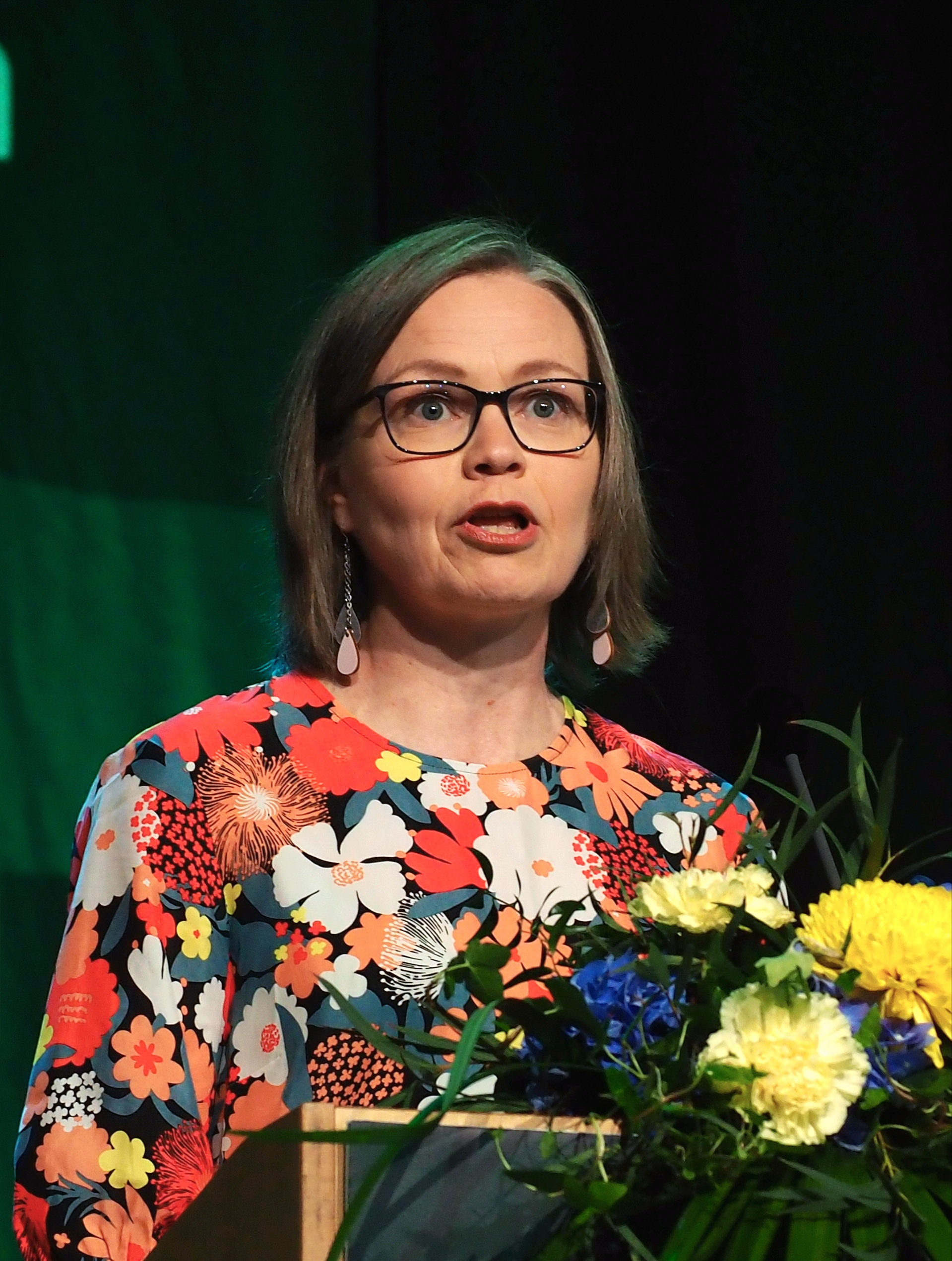
Tiina Elo
(New)

Jenni Pitko
(New)

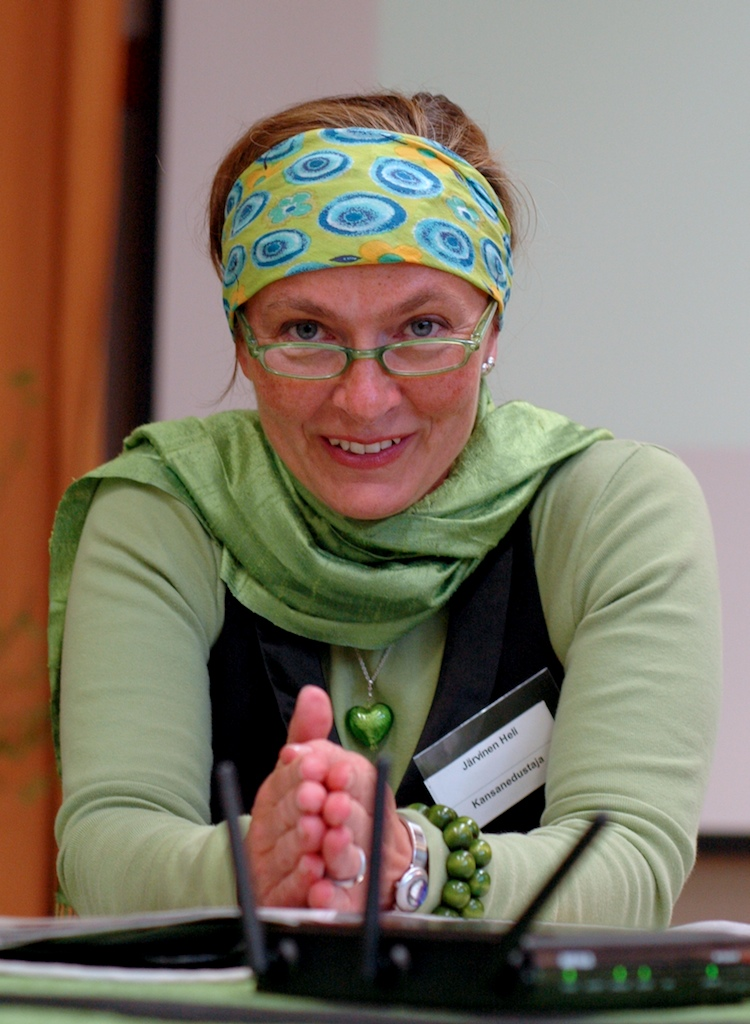
Heli Järvinen

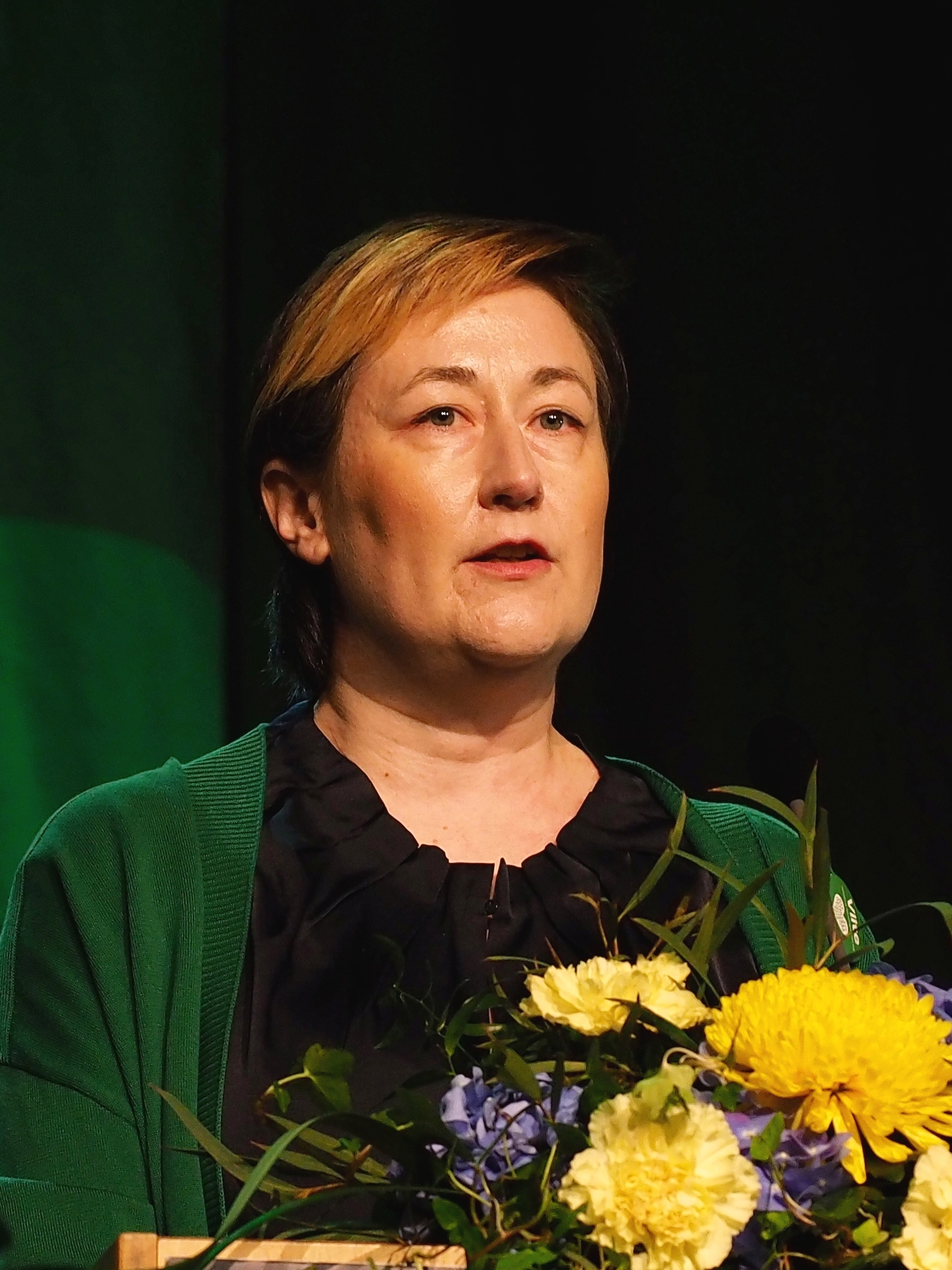
Hanna Holopainen
(New)

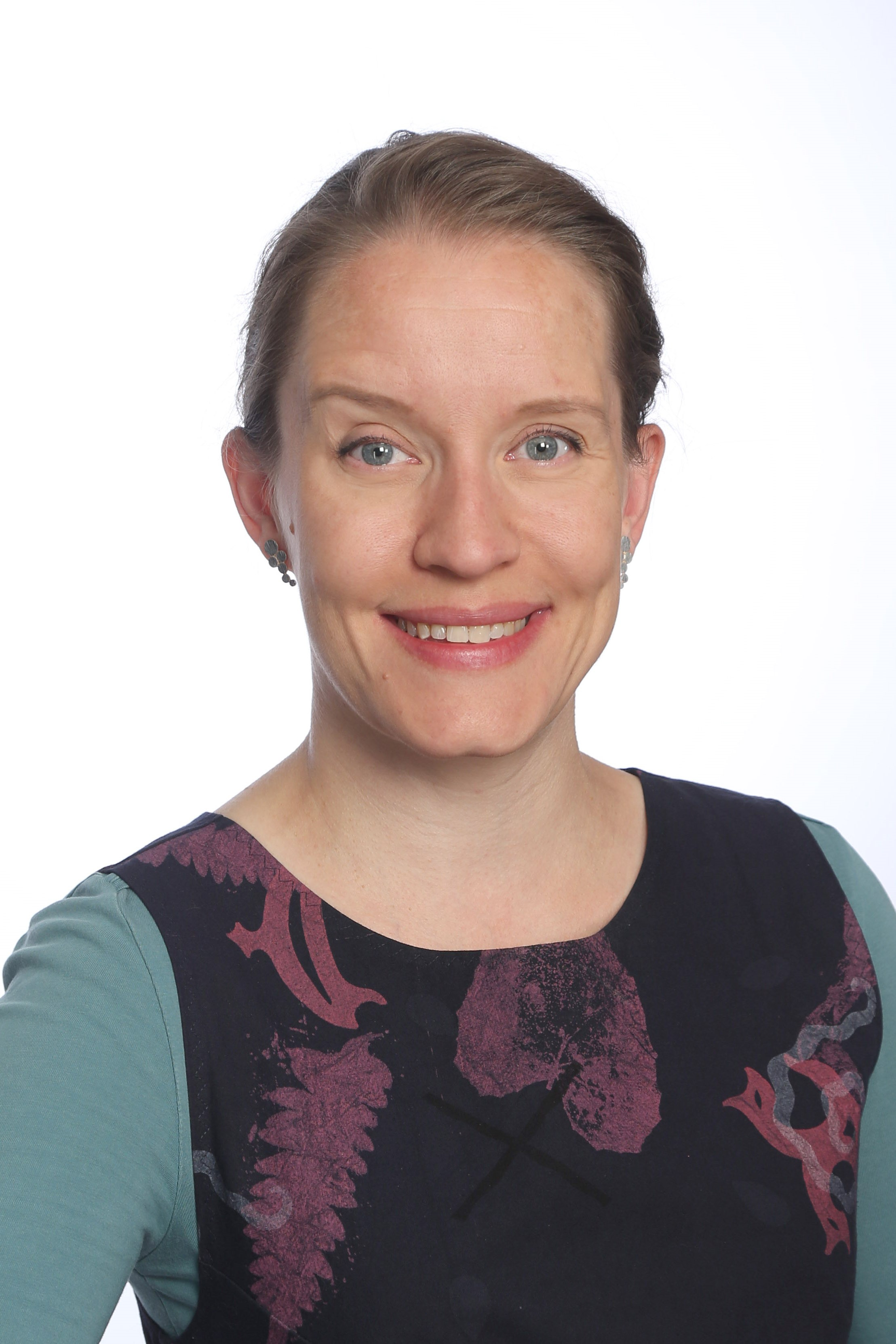
Mirka Soinikoski
(New)

=== Current members of the European Parliament ===
Since 2024, the Green League has been represented by two MEPs in the European Parliament.

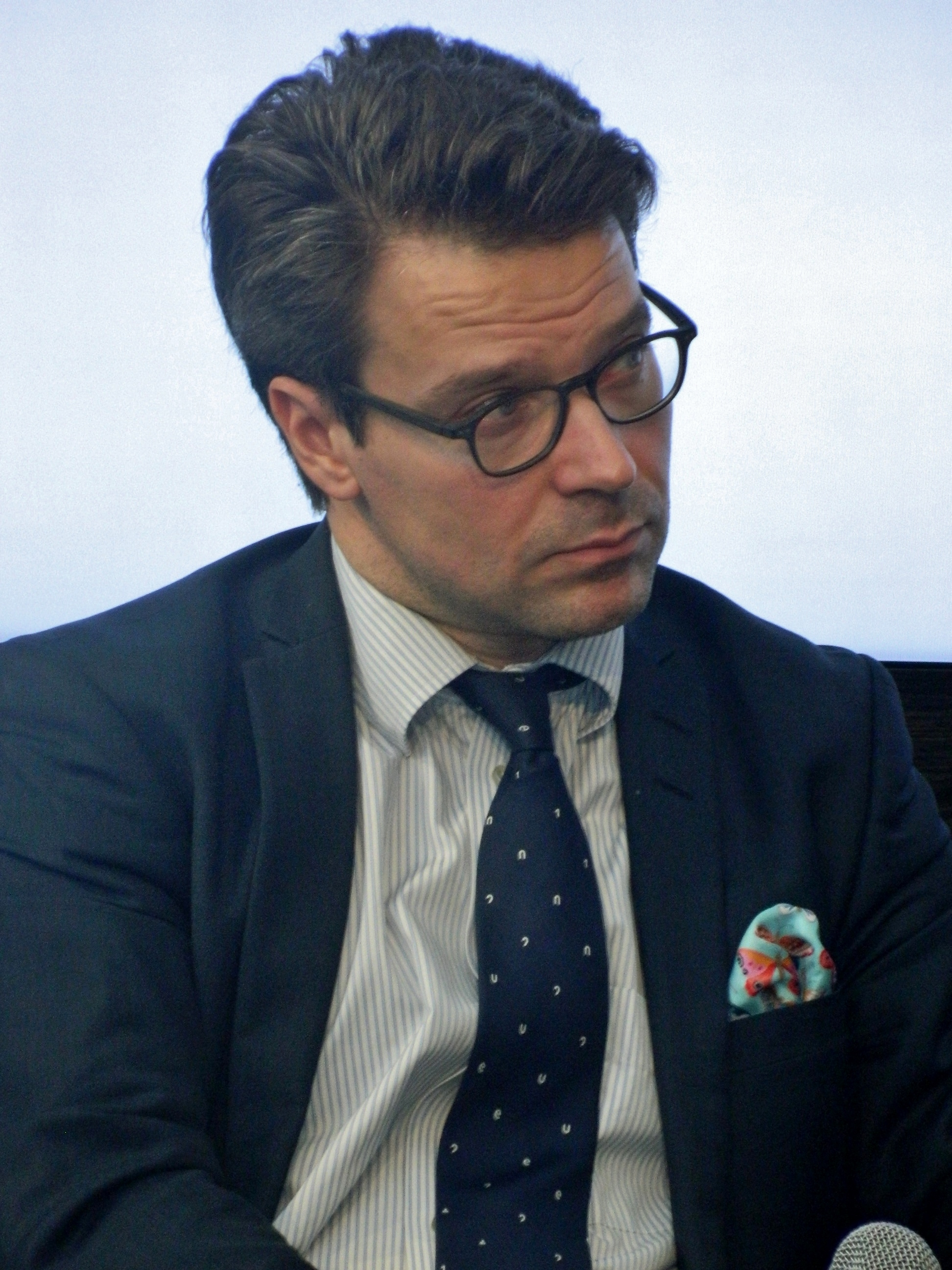
Ville Niinistö

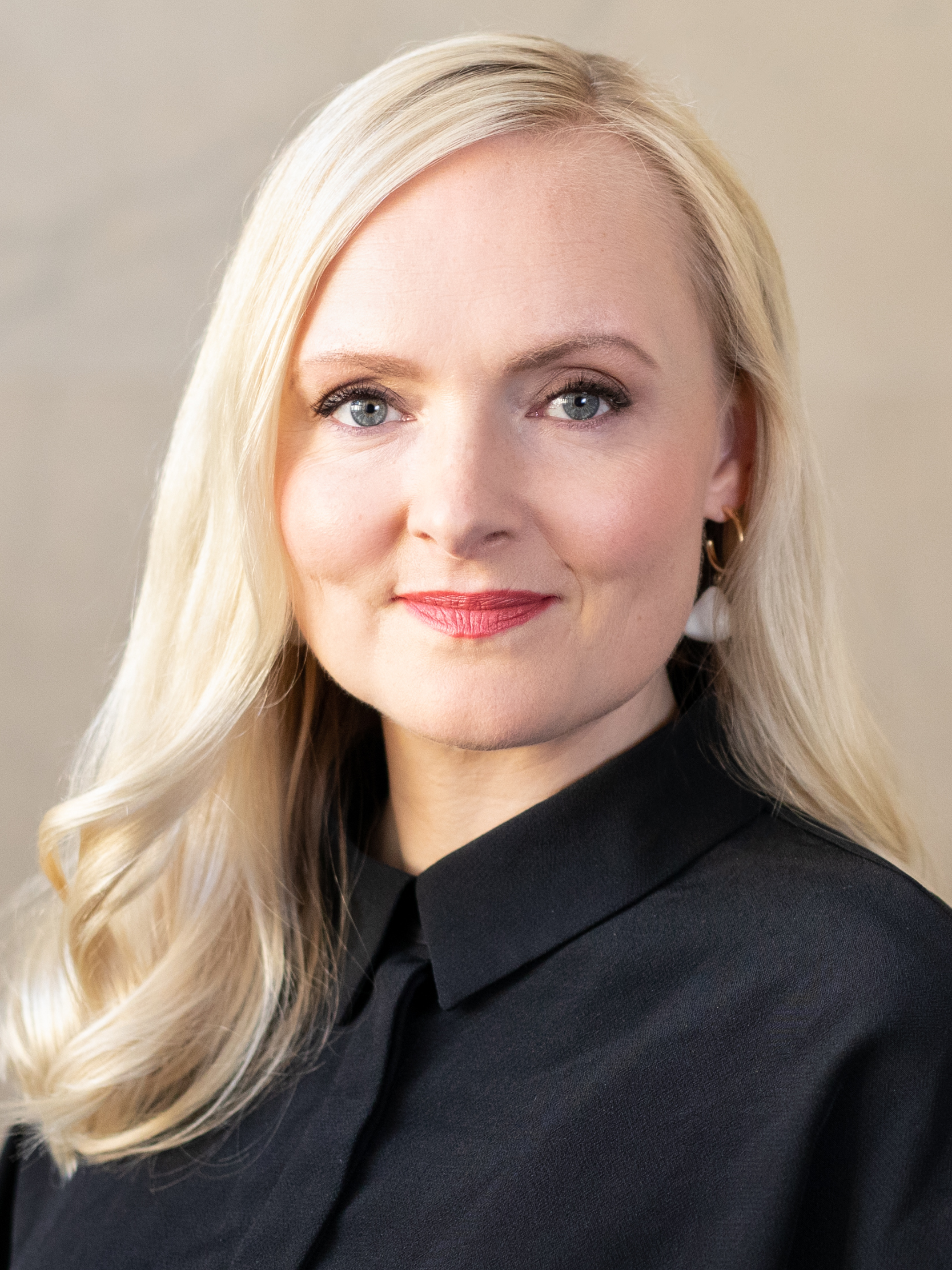
Maria Ohisalo

== See also ==
- Green politics
- List of environmental organizations
- Pentti Linkola
- Kirjava "Puolue" – Elonkehän Puolesta
- Universal basic income in the Nordic countries
