= Saara Hyrkkö =

Finnish politician (born 1987)

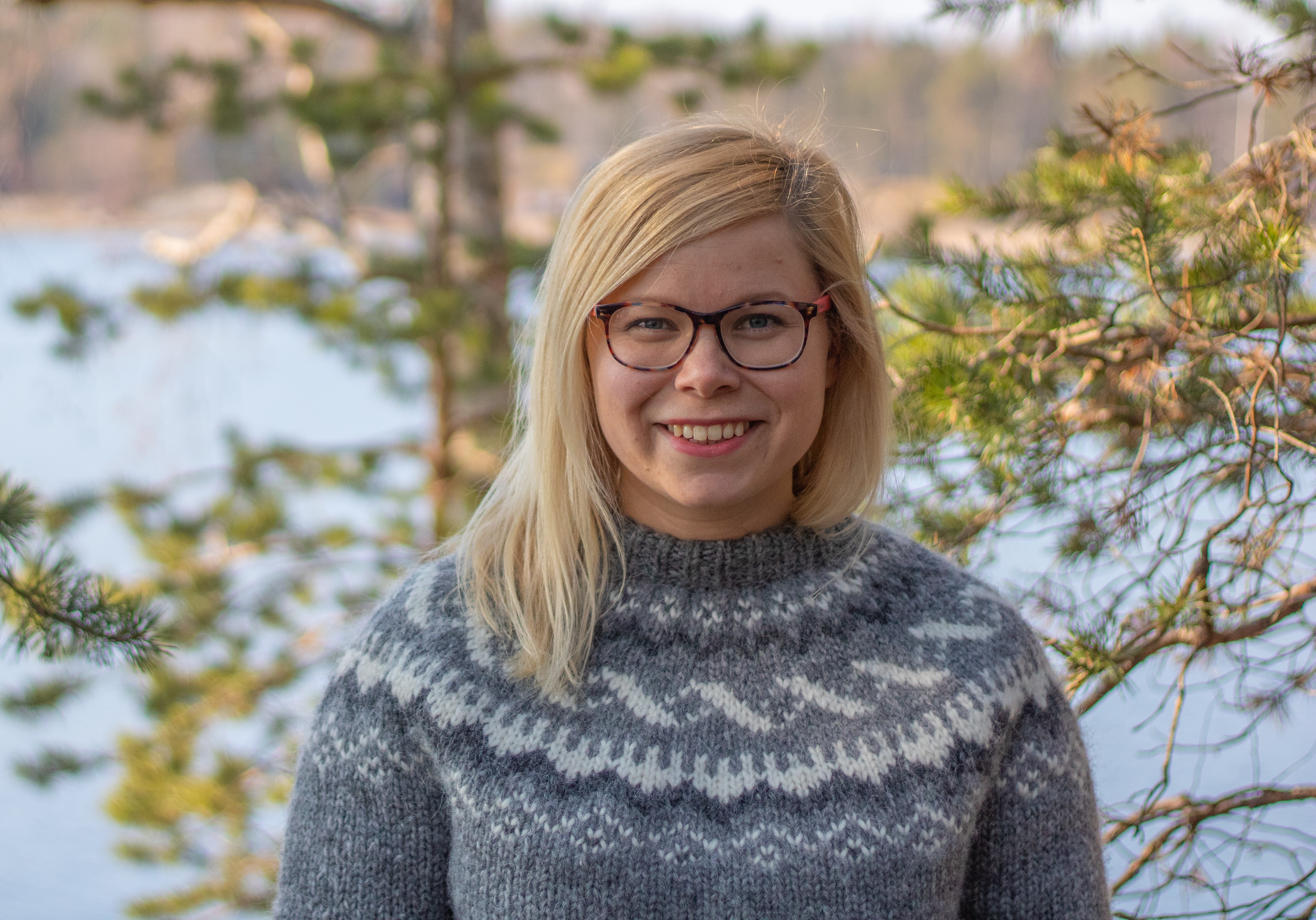
- Saara Hyrkkö in 2019

Member of the Finnish Parliament for Uusimaa

Personal details
- Born: 26 August 1987 (age 38) Helsinki, Uusimaa, Finland
- Party: Green League
- Occupation: Politician

Saara Inkeri Hyrkkö (born 26 August 1987 in Helsinki) is a Finnish politician currently serving in the Parliament of Finland for the Green League at the Uusimaa constituency.
