= Inka Hopsu =

Finnish politician (born 1976)

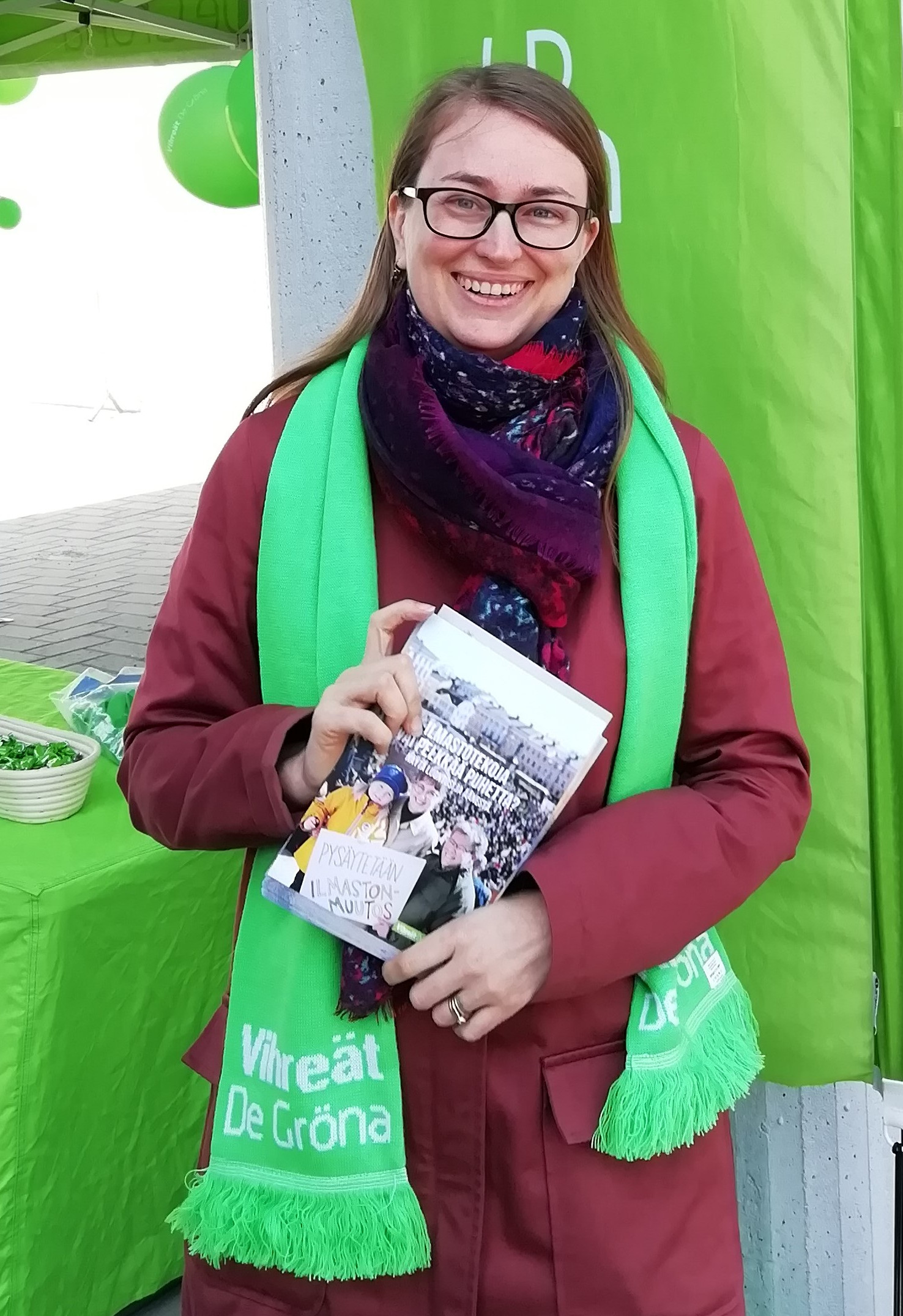

Member of the Finnish Parliament for Uusimaa
- Incumbent
- Assumed office 17 April 2019

Personal details
- Born: 25 September 1976 (age 49) Espoo, Uusimaa, Finland
- Party: Green League
- Occupation: Politician

Inka Inari Hopsu (born 25 September 1976 in Espoo) is a Finnish politician currently serving in the Parliament of Finland for the Green League at the Uusimaa constituency.
