= Opinion polling for the 2027 Finnish parliamentary election =

In the run-up to the 2027 Finnish parliamentary election, various organisations carried out opinion polling to gauge voting intentions in Finland. Results of such polls are displayed in this list. The date range for these opinion polls are from the 2023 Finnish parliamentary election, held on 2 April, to the present day.

== Political polling in Finland ==
The political polling industry in Finland can be generally considered reliable. The absolute total raw error in the 2021 election ranged between 6.7 and 8.5 points, representing a relatively low error rate compared to the European average of 13.0. Pollster watchdog Europe Elects reviewed reports about Tietoykkönen, Åbo Akademi, Taloustutkimus, and Verian and found no documented conflict of interest.

== National opinion polls ==
=== Vote share ===
==== 2026 ====
Dates conducted	Polling firm	Sample size	KOK	PS	SDP	KESK	VAS	VIHR	SFP	KD	LIIK	Others	Lead	Gov.	Opp.
20 Oct–11 Nov 2026	Verian	4,128	15.6	15.4	23.0	13.5	12.0	9.1	4.0	3.0	2.4	2.0	7.4	38	60
12 Oct–3 Nov 2026	Taloustutkimus	2,170	15.4	16.7	22.9	12.2	12.6	8.6	4.1	3.5	2.1	1.9	6.2	39.7	58.4
15 Sep–19 Oct 2026	Verian	4,076	16.2	15.3	23.3	13.8	11.6	8.6	4.0	2.8	2.4	2.0	7.1	38.3	59.7
7 Sep–5 Oct 2026	Taloustutkimus	2,807	16.3	16.5	22.7	12.6	12.4	8.3	3.6	3.4	2.1	1.9	6.2	39.8	58.1
18 Aug–14 Sep 2026	Verian	3,078	16.5	15.0	23.4	13.6	11.6	8.6	4.1	3.0	2.2	2.0	6.9	38.6	59.4
10 Aug–1 Sep 2026	Taloustutkimus	2,502	17.0	16.3	22.6	13.5	11.7	8.2	3.6	3.4	1.9	1.8	5.6	40.3	57.9
14 Jul–17 Aug 2026	Verian	2,946	16.5	14.6	23.8	13.7	11.3	8.8	4.0	3.0	2.3	2.0	7.3	38.1	59.9
6 Jul–3 Aug 2026	Taloustutkimus	2,125	17.0	15.6	23.8	12.7	10.3	9.0	3.7	3.5	2.2	2.2	6.8	39.8	58
15 Jun–13 Jul 2026	Verian	3,512	16.7	14.2	23.8	13.7	11.5	8.8	4.0	3.1	2.1	2.1	7.1	38	59.9
4–30 Jun 2026	Taloustutkimus	2,433	17.4	14.5	23.2	13.6	11.4	8.6	3.8	3.4	1.3	2.8	5.8	39.1	58.1
18 May–15 Jun 2026	Verian	4,080	17.4	13.6	24.1	13.6	11.2	9.0	3.9	3.1	2.1	2.0	6.7	38	60
11 May–1 Jun 2026	Taloustutkimus	2,224	18.3	13.8	23.0	14.1	11.2	8.3	3.9	3.4	1.7	2.3	4.7	39.4	58.3
21 Apr–18 May 2026	Verian	4,120	17.3	13.4	24.3	13.6	11.0	9.1	3.8	3.3	2.0	2.2	7.0	37.8	60
13 Apr–5 May 2026	Taloustutkimus	2,378	17.6	13.9	23.7	14.2	10.9	9.1	3.2	4.0	1.7	1.7	6.1	38.7	59.6
18 Mar–20 Apr 2026	Verian	4,340	17.6	13.3	24.6	13.7	10.6	9.2	4.0	3.1	1.9	2.0	7.0	38	60
4 Mar–7 Apr 2026	Taloustutkimus	2,543	17.4	13.5	24.1	14.5	11.3	8.7	3.8	3.2	1.0	2.5	6.7	37.9	59.6
17 Feb–16 Mar 2026	Verian	4,048	17.8	13.4	24.8	13.7	10.4	8.9	4.0	3.2	1.8	2.0	7.0	38.4	59.6
9 Feb–3 Mar 2026	Taloustutkimus	2,402	17.9	14.9	25.0	13.2	11.0	8.2	3.4	3.3	1.0	2.1	7.1	39.5	58.4
20 Jan–16 Feb 2026	Verian	4,072	17.9	13.0	25.1	14.1	10.4	8.5	4.0	3.3	1.7	2.0	7.2	38.2	59.8
12 Jan–3 Feb 2026	Taloustutkimus	2,402	18.8	13.3	25.0	14.3	11.1	7.9	3.8	3.4	1.0	1.4	6.2	39.3	59.3
5 Dec 2025–19 Jan 2026	Verian	4,050	18.4	13.4	25.0	14.3	10.0	8.3	4.0	3.0	1.5	2.1	6.6	38.8	59.1
2 Apr 2023	2023 election	–	20.82	20.06	19.95	11.29	7.06	7.04	4.31	4.22	2.44	2.81	0.76	49.41	47.78

==== 2025 ====
Dates conducted	Polling firm	Sample size	KOK	PS	SDP	KESK	VAS	VIHR	SFP	KD	LIIK	Others	Lead	Gov.	Opp.
8 Dec 2025–2 Jan 2026	Taloustutkimus	2,024	19.6	15.1	23.9	13.5	10.7	8.4	3.2	3.1	0.7	1.8	4.3	41	57.2
17 Nov–14 Dec 2025	Verian	4,075	18.0	13.1	25.3	14.8	9.5	8.6	4.0	3.0	1.7	2.0	7.3	38.1	59.9
10 Nov–2 Dec 2025	Taloustutkimus	2,407	18.7	14.2	24.7	13.9	10.2	7.6	3.8	3.4	1.5	2.0	6.0	40.1	57.9
13 Oct–16 Nov 2025	Verian	3,971	18.3	13.4	24.7	15.3	9.1	8.5	4.0	3.1	1.6	2.0	6.4	38.8	59.2
6 Oct–4 Nov 2025	Taloustutkimus	2,520	19.0	14.6	25.4	13.8	9.5	7.3	3.9	3.5	1.3	1.7	6.4	41	57.3
15 Sep–12 Oct 2025	Verian	3,598	18.2	12.8	24.8	15.7	9.4	8.8	3.8	3.0	1.5	2.0	6.6	37.8	60.2
3–30 Sep 2025	Taloustutkimus	2,383	18.6	14.9	24.9	14.3	9.6	7.5	4.1	3.5	1.2	1.4	6.3	41.1	57.5
18 Aug–14 Sep 2025	Verian	3,793	18.4	11.4	25.3	16.1	9.7	8.6	4.0	3.1	1.3	2.1	6.9	36.9	61
11 Aug–2 Sep 2025	Taloustutkimus	2,266	19.2	12.8	25.8	14.7	9.5	7.7	3.5	3.9	0.8	2.1	6.6	39.4	58.5
15 Jul–17 Aug 2025	Verian	3,012	18.8	11.0	25.2	16.3	10.0	8.3	4.0	3.2	1.2	2.0	6.4	37	61
7 Jul–5 Aug 2025	Taloustutkimus	2,844	19.1	12.3	24.7	15.1	10.1	8.6	3.9	3.5	0.9	1.8	5.6	38.8	59.4
16 Jun–14 Jul 2025	Verian	3,016	19.8	10.6	25.4	15.7	9.8	8.0	4.1	3.3	1.2	2.1	5.6	37.8	60.1
9–30 Jun 2025	Taloustutkimus	2,421	20.8	11.8	25.1	13.9	9.8	7.6	4.0	4.0	1.2	1.8	4.3	40.6	57.6
19 May–16 Jun 2025	Verian	4,083	19.8	10.0	25.2	15.7	10.0	8.2	4.4	3.1	1.3	2.3	5.4	37.3	60.4
12 May–2 Jun 2025	Taloustutkimus	2,401	21.5	10.8	25.1	14.1	9.5	8.7	3.7	3.7	0.9	2.0	3.6	39.7	58.3
16 Apr–18 May 2025	Verian	3,770	19.9	10.5	25.3	15.3	10.1	7.9	4.1	3.3	1.2	2.4	5.4	37.8	59.8
14 Apr–6 May 2025	Taloustutkimus	2,422	20.2	11.4	25.3	15.6	9.4	7.9	3.9	3.5	0.9	1.9	5.1	39	59.1
13 April 2025	2025 county elections and municipal elections are held.														
10 Mar–7 Apr 2025	Taloustutkimus	2,478	19.6	15.4	23.4	14.2	9.0	8.8	3.8	3.8	0.8	1.2	3.8	42.6	56.2
18 Feb–16 Mar 2025	Verian	3,224	19.3	14.2	24.2	13.2	9.4	7.8	4.1	3.4	2.0	2.4	4.9	41	56.6
10 Feb–4 Mar 2025	Taloustutkimus	2,519	20.0	15.4	22.8	13.7	8.5	7.8	3.9	4.7	1.0	2.2	2.8	44	53.8
21 Jan–16 Feb 2025	Verian	3,849	19.1	14.3	24.5	13.2	9.1	8.1	3.7	3.6	1.9	2.5	5.4	40.7	56.8
13 Jan–3 Feb 2025	Taloustutkimus	2,604	19.9	15.0	24.4	13.4	9.2	8.5	3.6	3.0	1.1	1.9	4.5	41.5	56.6
2 Apr 2023	2023 election	–	20.82	20.06	19.95	11.29	7.06	7.04	4.31	4.22	2.44	2.81	0.76	49.41	47.78

==== 2024 ====
Dates conducted	Polling firm	Sample size	KOK	PS	SDP	KESK	VAS	VIHR	SFP	KD	LIIK	Others	Lead	Gov.	Opp.
9 Dec 2024–7 Jan 2025	Taloustutkimus	2,533	20.0	14.9	23.2	13.1	8.9	8.3	3.9	3.9	1.5	2.3	3.2	42.7	55
18 Nov–13 Dec 2024	Verian	2,418	19.5	15.7	24.0	12.1	8.5	7.8	3.8	3.9	2.5	2.2	4.5	42.9	54.9
6 Nov–3 Dec 2024	Taloustutkimus	2,572	18.8	15.1	24.0	13.1	8.8	8.2	3.3	4.0	2.3	2.4	5.2	41.2	56.4
14 Oct–15 Nov 2024	Verian	2,622	19.8	16.3	22.5	12.2	9.1	7.8	3.9	3.9	2.4	2.1	2.7	43.9	54
7 Oct–5 Nov 2024	Taloustutkimus	2,383	18.8	15.7	24.3	13.1	9.3	8.0	4.0	3.5	1.1	2.2	5.5	42	55.8
19 Oct 2024	Minja Koskela is elected leader of the Left Alliance														
16 Sep–11 Oct 2024	Verian	2,432	19.4	16.1	22.8	12.5	8.6	8.0	4.2	4.0	2.2	2.2	3.4	43.7	54.1
4 Sep–1 Oct 2024	Taloustutkimus	2,600	20.0	16.7	22.6	13.2	9.3	7.6	3.9	3.4	1.4	1.9	2.6	44	54.1
19 Aug–13 Sep 2024	Verian	2,416	20.6	15.6	22.0	12.0	8.9	8.3	4.2	4.1	1.8	2.5	1.4	44.5	53
12 Aug–3 Sep 2024	Taloustutkimus	2,308	21.9	16.7	22.3	10.8	9.3	8.2	3.6	4.1	1.6	1.5	0.4	46.3	52.2
15 Jul–16 Aug 2024	Verian	2,542	20.2	15.0	20.9	12.9	10.1	8.0	4.3	4.2	2.2	2.2	0.7	43.7	54.1
8 Jul–6 Aug 2024	Taloustutkimus	2,497	21.6	15.9	20.4	11.9	10.9	8.9	3.6	3.7	1.0	2.1	1.2	44.8	53.1
17 Jun–12 Jul 2024	Verian	2,388	20.8	15.6	20.8	11.8	10.0	8.2	4.6	3.8	2.2	2.2	0.0	44.8	53
7 Jun–2 Jul 2024	Taloustutkimus	2,481	21.2	15.3	20.1	12.2	11.6	8.3	3.9	3.7	1.9	1.8	1.1	44.1	54.1
16 Jun 2024	Anders Adlercreutz is elected leader of the Swedish People's Party														
15 Jun 2024	Antti Kaikkonen is elected leader of the Centre Party														
20 May–14 Jun 2024	Verian	2,412	20.0	14.9	21.2	12.2	9.9	8.4	4.5	4.3	2.3	2.3	1.2	43.7	54
8 May–4 Jun 2024	Taloustutkimus	2,452	22.3	14.8	23.0	11.5	9.5	8.0	3.7	3.7	0.8	2.7	0.7	44.5	52.8
15 Apr–17 May 2024	Verian	2,484	19.9	16.2	22.7	12.1	9.0	7.8	3.4	4.2	2.2	2.5	2.8	43.7	53.8
3 Apr–7 May 2024	Taloustutkimus	2,490	21.3	15.6	24.4	11.5	8.8	7.7	3.4	4.0	1.8	1.5	3.1	44.3	54.2
18 Mar–12 Apr 2024	Verian	2,226	19.9	17.8	21.6	11.3	9.3	8.1	3.8	4.1	2.0	2.1	1.7	45.6	52.3
11 Mar–2 Apr 2024	Taloustutkimus	2,613	20.6	17.4	21.7	12.0	9.5	8.3	3.4	3.6	1.7	1.8	1.1	45	53.2
19 Feb–15 Mar 2024	Verian	2,426	20.7	18.9	19.6	11.7	9.0	8.1	3.8	3.9	2.3	2.0	1.1	47.3	50.7
12 Feb–5 Mar 2024	Taloustutkimus	2,428	21.6	18.0	19.8	12.2	9.0	8.9	3.7	3.1	1.9	1.8	1.8	47.3	51.8
15 Jan–16 Feb 2024	Verian	2,740	21.3	19.6	19.6	11.1	8.9	8.1	3.6	4.1	1.7	2.0	1.7	48.6	49.4
3 Jan–6 Feb 2024	Taloustutkimus	2,662	22.4	20.0	20.4	10.8	8.5	8.2	3.4	3.6	1.4	1.3	2.0	49.4	49.3
2 Apr 2023	2023 election	–	20.82	20.06	19.95	11.29	7.06	7.04	4.31	4.22	2.44	2.81	0.76	49.41	47.78

==== 2023 ====
Dates conducted	Polling firm	Sample size	KOK	PS	SDP	KESK	VAS	VIHR	SFP	KD	LIIK	Others	Lead	Gov.	Opp.
29 Nov 2023–2 Jan 2024	Taloustutkimus	2,581	22.9	17.6	21.0	10.1	8.6	7.7	3.9	4.1	2.1	2.0	1.9	48.5	49.5
6 Nov–10 Dec 2023	Kantar Public	2,622	21.4	17.9	20.8	9.9	9.1	8.5	4.1	4.0	2.2	2.1	0.6	47.4	50.5
1 Nov–28 Nov 2023	Taloustutkimus	2,535	22.6	17.0	22.3	10.5	8.6	8.4	3.5	3.6	1.9	1.6	0.3	46.7	51.7
9 Oct–3 Nov 2023	Kantar Public	2,388	20.6	17.2	21.5	10.2	9.1	8.8	4.1	3.9	2.1	2.5	0.9	45.8	51.7
4–31 Oct 2023	Taloustutkimus	2,395	20.2	17.3	23.5	10.4	8.5	8.7	4.2	3.4	2.2	1.6	3.3	45.1	53.3
11 Sep–6 Oct 2023	Kantar Public	2,428	21.0	18.0	20.7	10.1	9.1	8.4	4.2	4.0	1.8	2.7	0.3	47.2	50.1
6 Sep–3 Oct 2023	Taloustutkimus	2,490	21.5	17.5	20.8	10.7	9.8	9.1	4.0	3.7	1.2	1.7	0.7	46.7	51.6
14 Aug–8 Sep 2023	Kantar Public	2,456	21.0	18.4	21.6	9.8	8.3	8.6	4.2	4.1	1.8	2.2	0.6	47.7	50.1
2 Aug–5 Sep 2023	Taloustutkimus	2,459	21.2	18.5	21.4	11.5	8.0	7.7	4.4	4.0	1.3	2.0	0.2	48.1	49.9
1 Sep 2023	Antti Lindtman is elected leader of the Social Democratic Party														
17 Jul–11 Aug 2023	Kantar Public	2,460	21.4	19.0	21.5	9.5	8.0	8.1	4.4	3.7	2.0	2.4	0.1	48.5	49.1
5 Jul–1 Aug 2023	Taloustutkimus	2,509	19.8	19.2	22.8	10.7	8.5	8.0	3.9	4.0	1.4	1.7	3.0	46.9	51.4
19 Jun–15 Jul 2023	Kantar Public	2,486	22.0	19.8	19.4	9.8	8.1	8.0	4.5	3.9	2.1	2.4	2.2	50.2	47.4
12 Jun–4 Jul 2023	Taloustutkimus	2,468	22.1	20.2	20.6	10.0	7.8	8.6	4.1	3.8	1.2	1.6	1.5	50.2	48.2
20 Jun 2023	Jussi Halla-aho is elected Speaker of the Parliament of Finland														
20 Jun 2023	The Orpo Cabinet (composed of KOK, PS, SFP and KD) is sworn in and Petteri Orpo becomes the 47th Prime Minister of Finland														
15 May–15 June 2023	Kantar Public	2,754	21.3	20.9	19.2	10.2	8.0	7.7	4.4	4.0	2.0	2.3	0.4	50.6	47.1
10 Jun 2023	Sofia Virta becomes the new leader of the Green League														
3 May–6 Jun 2023	Taloustutkimus	2,533	22.5	21.0	19.6	9.7	7.5	7.3	4.5	4.0	1.7	2.2	1.5	48.6	49.2
3 Apr–12 May 2023	Kantar Public	2,860	21.4	21.0	19.0	10.1	7.8	7.7	4.5	4.1	1.9	2.5	0.4	49.1	48.4
3 Apr–2 May 2023	Taloustutkimus	2,594	21.6	20.6	19.9	10.2	7.5	7.5	4.3	4.1	2.0	2.3	1.0	49.2	48.5
12 Apr 2023	Petteri Orpo becomes Speaker of the Parliament of Finland														
2 Apr 2023	2023 election	–	20.82	20.06	19.95	11.29	7.06	7.04	4.31	4.22	2.44	2.81	0.76	49.41	47.78

== Sub-national opinion polls ==
=== By electoral district ===
==== Varsinais-Suomi ====
Dates conducted	Polling firm	Sample size	KOK	PS	SDP	KESK	VAS	VIHR	SFP	KD	LIIK	Others	Lead	Gov.	Opp.
April 2026	Iro Research	TBA	19.3	15.9	21.7	10.8	12.8	7.6	4.3	3.1	2.7	1.8	2.4	42.6	55.6
2 Apr 2023	2023 election	–	23.0	20.0	18.1	8.4	11.6	7.0	4.9	2.8	2.3	1.8	3.0	50.7	47.4

== See also ==
- Opinion polling for the 2019 Finnish parliamentary election
- Opinion polling for the 2023 Finnish parliamentary election
