= Iiris Suomela =

Finnish politician (born 1994)

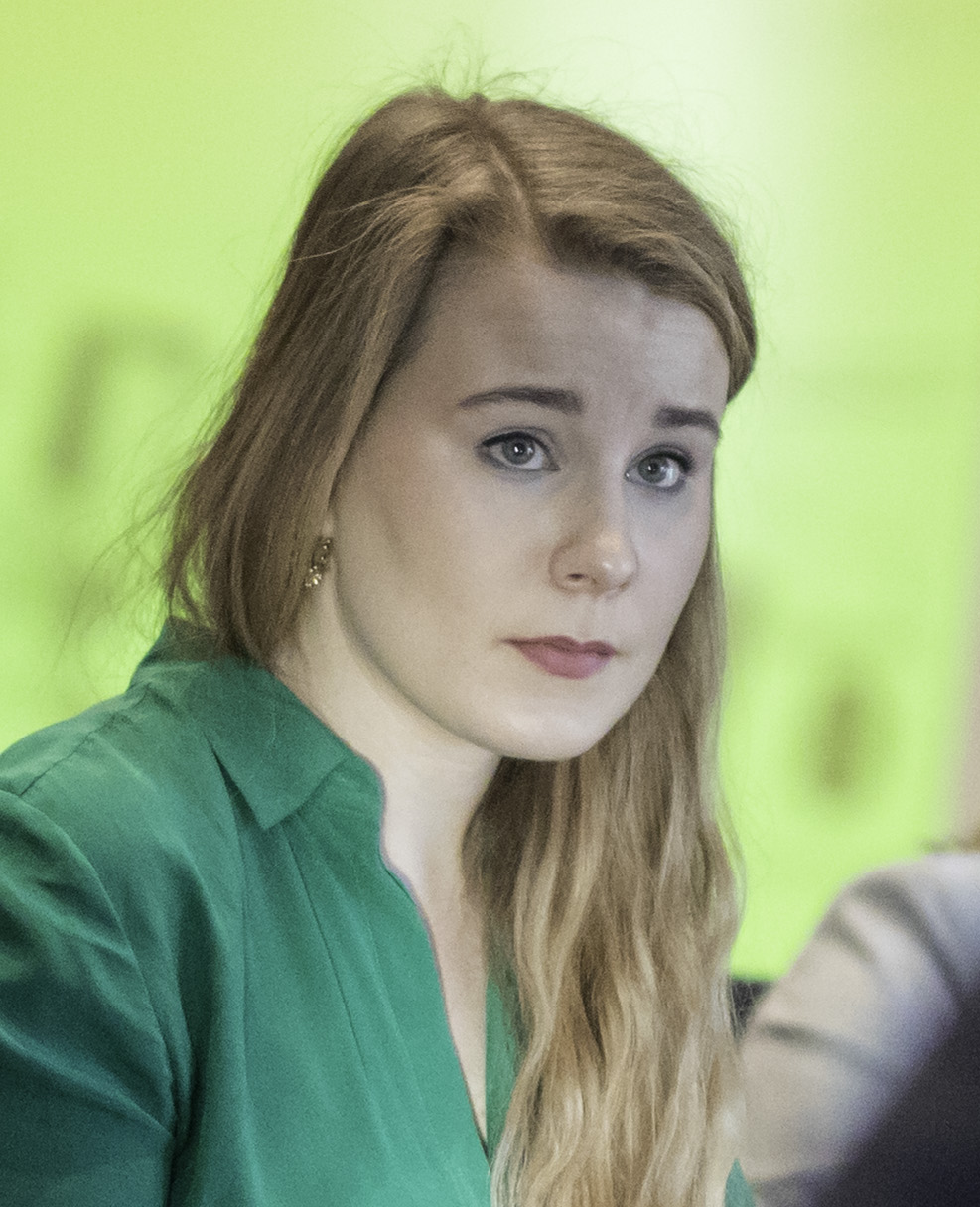
- Suomela in 2020

Member of the Finnish Parliament for Pirkanmaa

Personal details
- Born: 1 May 1994 (age 32) Tampere, Finland
- Party: Green League
- Children: 1

Iiris Suomela (born 1 May 1994) is a Finnish politician who formerly served in the Parliament of Finland for the Green League at the Pirkanmaa constituency. She was a member of the Grand Committee and the Finance Committee. She has also formerly been vice chairperson for Tampere city council, and a Member of the Board of Directors of University of Tampere.

While the elected temporarily leader of the Green League, Maria Ohisalo, was on parental leave during first half of 2022, Suomela was the acting chairperson of the party. Suomela led the party into country's first county elections in January 2022, in which the Green League was among the biggest losers, as health and social care tend to be topics that do not attract younger voters who make up a major part of Green League's supporters.

== Early life and education ==
Suomela was born in Tampere. She did her International Baccaulerate in Atlantic College, which is located in Wales and is part of the United World Colleges network. Soon after, she started her master's degree studies in sociology in University of Tampere.

== Political career ==
Suomela is an environmentalist and human rights advocate. She was one of two founders of the Suostumus2018 campaign whose goal was to rewrite the Finnish penal code regarding sexual assault so that lack of consent would be sufficient to convict an assaulter (whereas previously there had to be e.g. a threat of violence). The parliament approved the law in its new form in June 2022.

Suomela was elected Member of Parliament in the 2019 parliamentary elections from the Pirkanmaa constituency with 4,873 votes. In the same year, Suomela was also a candidate for the European Parliament but was not elected.

In the parliamentary election 2023, Suomela failed to get reelected but said she's planning to run in the next election. After her mandate as an MP expired, she resumed her studies at the University of Tampere.

== Personal life and family ==
Suomela's partner is entrepreneur and former politician Matti Parpala. They had a child in November 2020.
