= Opinion polling for the 2023 Finnish parliamentary election =

In the run-up to the 2023 Finnish parliamentary election, various organisations carried out opinion polling to gauge voting intentions in Finland. Results of such polls are displayed in this list.

The date range for these opinion polls are from the 2019 Finnish parliamentary election, held on 14 April, to the election which was held on 2 April 2023.

== Opinion polls ==
=== Graphical summary ===
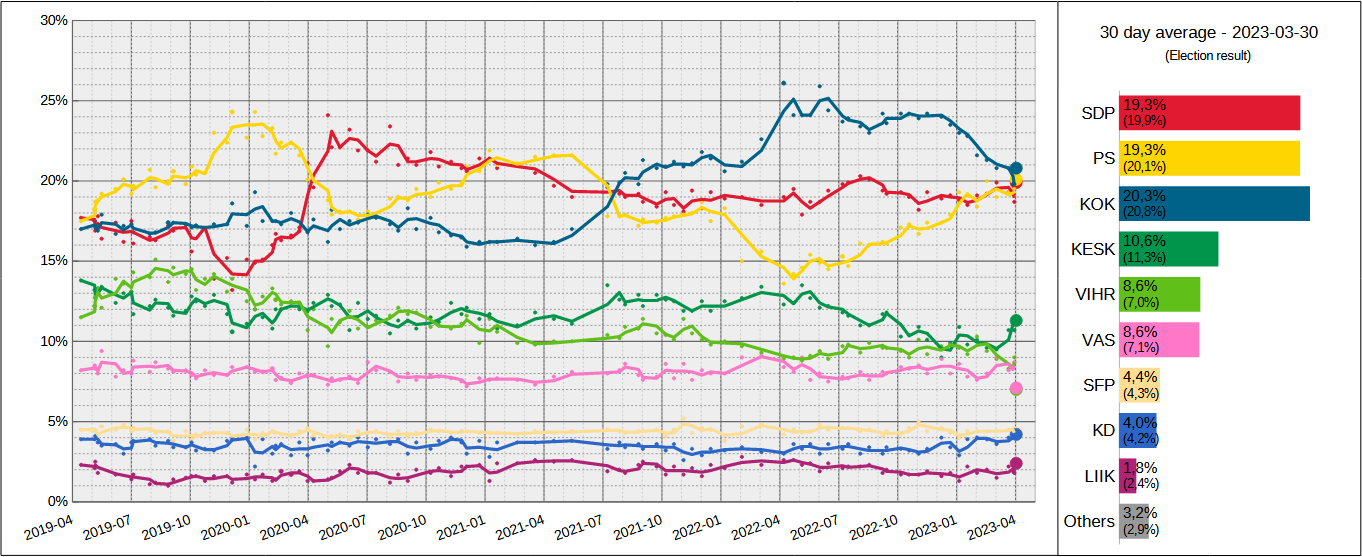

=== Vote share ===
Polling firm	Fieldwork date	Sample size	SDP	PS	KOK	KESK	VIHR	VAS	SFP	KD	LIIK	Others	Lead	Gov.	Opp.
2023 election	2 Apr 2023	–	19.9	20.1	20.8	11.3	7.0	7.1	4.3	4.2	2.4	2.9	0.7	49.6	47.6
Taloustutkimus	1–28 Mar 2023	2,533	18.7	19.5	19.8	10.7	9.0	8.7	4.1	4.4	1.8	3.3	0.3	51.2	45.5
Kantar Public	9–23 Mar 2023	2,002	19.2	19.2	19.8	11.4	8.4	8.3	4.5	4.0	1.9	3.3	0.6	51.8	44.9
Kantar Public	13 Feb–17 Mar 2023	2,584	19.3	19.3	20.8	10.7	8.3	8.2	4.5	4.0	2.2	2.7	1.5	51	46.3
Taloustutkimus	6–28 Feb 2023	2,459	19.9	19.0	20.8	9.5	8.9	9.0	4.4	3.6	1.5	3.4	0.9	51.7	44.9
Kantar Public	16 Jan–10 Feb 2023	2,412	19.2	20.0	21.3	9.6	9.4	8.0	4.4	3.9	2.0	2.2	1.3	50.6	47.2
Taloustutkimus	9 Jan–31 Jan 2023	2,466	19.1	18.4	21.6	10.1	10.3	7.6	4.4	4.0	1.8	2.7	2.5	51.5	45.8
Kantar Public	19 Dec 2022–13 Jan 2023	2,420	18.5	19.1	22.8	9.8	9.2	7.8	4.4	3.9	2.2	2.3	3.7	49.7	48
Taloustutkimus	7 Dec 2022–3 Jan 2023	2,953	18.8	19.3	23.0	10.9	9.6	8.6	4.0	2.9	1.3	1.6	3.7	51.9	46.5
Kantar Public	14 Nov–16 Dec 2022	2,512	19.1	17.9	23.5	9.9	9.8	8.0	4.3	3.4	1.8	2.3	4.4	51.1	46.6
Taloustutkimus	7 Nov–5 Dec 2022	2,709	18.9	17.4	24.0	9.0	9.7	8.9	4.6	4.0	1.6	1.9	5.1	51.1	47
Kantar Public	17 Oct–11 Nov 2022	2,416	19.3	17.4	24.2	10.1	9.2	8.0	4.4	3.3	1.9	2.2	4.9	51	46.8
Taloustutkimus	10 Oct–1 Nov 2022	2,502	18.2	16.7	23.9	10.9	10.1	8.5	5.0	3.0	1.7	2.0	5.7	52.7	45.3
Kantar Public	12 Sep–14 Oct 2022	2,462	19.0	17.3	24.2	10.4	9.0	8.3	4.6	3.2	1.7	2.3	5.2	51.3	46.4
Taloustutkimus	8 Sep–4 Oct 2022	2,714	19.3	17.1	24.2	10.3	9.4	8.4	4.2	3.3	1.7	2.1	4.9	51.6	46.3
Kantar Public	15 Aug–11 Sep 2022	2,460	19.2	16.1	23.6	11.8	9.6	8.0	4.4	3.4	2.0	1.9	4.4	53	45.1
Taloustutkimus	8 Aug–6 Sep 2022	2,973	19.4	16.2	24.2	11.7	9.6	8.1	4.1	3.0	1.8	1.9	4.8	52.9	45.2
Kantar Public	18 Jul–12 Aug 2022	2,586	20.1	16.0	23.0	11.0	9.9	7.6	4.5	3.4	2.3	2.2	2.9	53.1	44.7
Taloustutkimus	6 Jul–2 Aug 2022	2,831	20.3	16.1	23.4	11.0	9.3	8.1	4.4	3.0	2.2	2.2	3.1	53.1	44.7
Kantar TNS	13 Jun–12 Jul 2022	2,460	19.9	14.7	23.9	11.6	9.8	7.7	4.6	3.6	2.2	2.0	4.0	53.6	44.4
Taloustutkimus	6 Jun–5 Jul 2022	2,348	19.8	15.3	23.7	11.8	9.7	7.8	4.6	3.3	2.1	1.9	3.9	53.7	44.4
Kantar TNS	16 May–10 Jun 2022	2,442	19.4	14.5	24.4	12.2	8.9	7.5	4.5	3.6	2.4	2.6	5.0	52.5	44.9
Taloustutkimus	4–31 May 2022	2,899	18.7	14.9	25.9	12.1	9.4	8.0	4.8	3.0	1.9	1.3	7.2	53	45.7
Kantar TNS	18 Apr–13 May 2022	2,420	18.7	15.4	24.1	12.7	9.1	7.6	4.4	3.6	2.4	2.0	5.4	52.5	45.5
Taloustutkimus	7 Apr–3 May 2022	2,657	17.9	14.6	24.1	13.5	8.8	9.0	4.3	3.3	2.3	2.2	6.2	53.5	44.3
Kantar TNS	14 Mar–13 Apr 2022	2,612	19.5	14.2	24.1	12.4	9.0	8.1	4.5	3.6	2.6	2.0	4.6	53.5	44.5
Taloustutkimus	2 Mar–5 Apr 2022	2,740	19.0	13.6	26.1	12.3	8.9	8.4	4.2	3.0	2.6	1.9	7.1	52.8	45.3
	24 Feb 2022		Beginning of Russian invasion of Ukraine												
Kantar TNS	14 Feb–11 Mar 2022	2,382	18.9	14.7	22.5	13.2	9.2	8.5	4.4	3.3	2.7	2.6 (Note: VKK with 1.1%)	3.6	54.2	43.2
Taloustutkimus	2 Feb–1 Mar 2022	2,727	18.5	15.6	22.6	13.4	9.3	9.1	4.8	3.1	2.3	1.3	4.1	55.1	43.6
Kantar TNS	17 Jan–11 Feb 2022	2,390	19.1	15.4	21.9	14.0	9.3	8.2	4.3	3.3	2.5	2.0	2.8	54.9	43.1
Taloustutkimus	9 Jan–1 Feb 2022	2,727	19.0	15.0	21.2	12.7	9.7	9.0	4.7	3.4	2.8	2.5 (Note: VKK with 0.5%)	2.2	55.1	42.4
County elections	23 Jan 2022	-	19.3	11.1	21.6	19.2	7.4	8.0	4.9	4.2	1.8	2.4 (Note: VKK with 1.3%)	2.3	58.8	41.2
Taloustutkimus	1 Dec 2021–4 Jan 2022	2,245	18.9	18.3	20.6	12.5	10.0	8.0	3.8	3.2	2.1	2.6	1.7	53.2	44.2
Kantar TNS	16 Nov–10 Dec 2021	2,384	19.3	17.5	21.4	11.9	9.8	8.0	4.5	3.3	2.3	2.0	2.1	53.5	44.5
Taloustutkimus	3 Nov–30 Nov 2021	2,411	18.3	18.7	21.8	12.5	10.1	8.2	4.6	2.9	1.6	1.3	3.1	53.7	45
Kantar TNS	18 Oct–15 Nov 2021	2,402	19.4	18.0	21.1	11.9	10.5	7.6	4.3	3.3	2.1	1.8	1.7	53.7	44.5
Taloustutkimus	6 Oct–2 Nov 2021	2,535	18.1	17.9	20.9	11.9	11.4	8.6	5.2	2.6	1.7	1.7	2.8	55.2	43.1
Kantar TNS	18 Sep–15 Oct 2021	2,392	18.5	17.8	21.2	12.5	10.1	7.7	4.5	3.6	2.2	1.9	2.7	53.3	44.8
Taloustutkimus	1 Sep–5 Oct 2021	2,538	19.3	17.7	20.9	12.6	10.4	8.6	4.1	3.2	1.7	1.5	1.6	55	43.5
Kantar TNS	23 Aug–17 Sep 2021	2,384	18.4	17.4	20.8	12.9	10.5	7.8	4.5	3.6	2.2	1.9	2.4	54.1	44
Taloustutkimus	4–31 Aug 2021	2,369	18.7	17.6	21.3	12.2	11.4	7.6	4.4	3.3	2.5	1.0	2.6	54.3	44.7
Kantar TNS	26 Jul–20 Aug 2021	2,466	19.2	17.2	19.8	12.9	10.8	7.9	4.4	3.6	2.3	1.9	0.6	55.2	42.9
Taloustutkimus	12 Jul–3 Aug 2021	2,386	19.0	17.9	20.5	12.3	10.9	8.6	4.3	3.4	1.8	1.3	1.5	55.1	43.6
Kantar TNS	21 Jun–20 Jul 2021	2,512	19.2	17.8	19.9	12.6	10.2	8.2	4.4	3.7	2.0	2.0	0.7	54.6	43.4
Taloustutkimus	14 Jun–6 Jul 2021	2,634	19.6	17.8	19.8	13.5	10.4	8.0	4.5	3.3	1.9	1.2	0.2	56	42.8
Local elections	13 Jun 2021	-	17.7	14.5	21.4	14.9	10.6	7.9	5.0	3.6	1.6	2.8	3.4	56.1	41.1
Kantar TNS	12 Apr–7 May 2021	2,456	19.0	21.6	17.0	11.1	10.0	8.1	4.4	3.8	2.6	2.4	2.6	52.6	45
Kantar TNS	15 Mar–9 Apr 2021	2,462	19.7	21.6	16.2	11.4	10.0	7.8	4.3	3.8	2.5	2.7	1.9	53.2	44.1
Kantar TNS	15 Feb–12 Mar 2021	2,462	20.5	21.5	16.0	11.8	9.8	7.3	4.4	3.7	2.6	2.4	1.0	53.8	43.8
Kantar TNS	18 Jan–12 Feb 2021	2,480	21.0	21.1	16.4	11.0	9.9	7.6	4.2	3.7	2.4	2.7	0.1	53.7	43.6
Kantar TNS	21 Dec 2020–15 Jan 2021	2,610	20.8	21.0	16.2	10.8	10.6	7.7	4.3	3.7	2.4	2.5	0.2	54.2	43.3
Taloustutkimus	2 Dec 2020–5 Jan 2021	2,221	21.4	21.9	16.2	11.7	11.4	7.6	4.3	2.8	1.3	1.4	0.5	56.4	42.2
Kantar TNS	23 Nov–18 Dec 2020	2,614	21.4	20.6	16.2	11.4	9.9	7.7	4.3	3.8	2.3	2.4	0.8	54.7	42.9
Taloustutkimus	9 Nov–1 Dec 2020	2,707	20.6	20.9	15.9	12.1	11.6	7.2	4.4	3.0	2.2	2.1	0.3	55.9	42
Kantar TNS	19 Oct–20 Nov 2020	2,620	20.8	19.9	16.5	11.7	11.1	7.5	4.4	3.7	2.2	2.2	0.9	55.5	42.3
Taloustutkimus	12 Oct–3 Nov 2020	2,457	21.2	19.5	16.6	12.4	10.8	7.7	4.3	4.0	1.6	1.9	1.7	56.4	41.7
Kantar TNS	14 Sep–16 Oct 2020	2,683	20.9	19.9	16.8	11.2	11.0	7.8	4.4	3.8	2.1	2.1	1.0	55.3	42.6
Taloustutkimus	7 Sep–6 Oct 2020	2,284	21.8	19.0	17.7	11.5	10.9	7.9	4.5	3.3	1.8	1.6	2.8	56.6	41.8
Kantar TNS	17 Aug–12 Sep 2020	2,486	21.0	19.5	17.0	10.8	11.8	7.6	4.3	3.7	2.0	2.3	1.5	55.5	42.2
Taloustutkimus	10 Aug–1 Sep 2020	2,442	21.4	18.8	18.3	11.3	11.7	8.0	4.1	3.0	1.3	2.1	2.6	56.5	41.4
Kantar TNS	13 Jul–14 Aug 2020	2,612	21.0	19.0	16.9	11.3	12.1	7.5	4.4	3.9	1.7	2.2	2.0	56.3	41.5
Taloustutkimus	6 Jul–4 Aug 2020	2,435	23.4	18.9	17.3	10.5	11.6	8.1	4.0	3.6	1.2	1.4	4.5	57.6	41
Kantar TNS	15 Jun–10 Jul 2020	2,168	21.2	17.9	17.7	11.6	11.3	8.2	4.4	3.9	1.8	2.0	3.3	56.7	41.3
Taloustutkimus	3 Jun–30 Jun 2020	2,451	21.9	18.1	17.9	11.4	10.9	8.7	4.3	3.4	1.8	1.6	3.8	57.2	41.2
Kantar TNS	18 May–14 Jun 2020	2,144	21.9	17.6	17.4	12.4	10.8	7.4	4.4	4.0	1.8	2.3	4.3	56.9	40.8
Taloustutkimus	11 May–2 Jun 2020	2,447	23.2	18.1	17.5	10.7	11.9	7.8	3.9	3.5	2.3	1.1	5.1	57.5	41.4
Kantar TNS	20 Apr–14 May 2020	2,214	22.1	18.1	17.0	12.3	11.2	7.6	4.2	3.7	1.9	1.9	4.0	57.4	40.7
Taloustutkimus	14 Apr–5 May 2020	2,448	22.1	17.9	18.2	12.2	11.4	7.7	4.1	3.7	1.5	1.2	3.9	57.5	41.3
Tietoykkönen	14–29 Apr 2020	1,500	24.1	18.8	16.2	12.9	9.7	7.3	4.0	3.2	1.4	2.4	5.3	58	39.6
Kantar TNS	16 Mar–15 Apr 2020	2,360	20.4	20.2	16.8	12.6	11.2	7.4	4.2	3.5	2.0	1.7	0.2	55.8	42.5
Taloustutkimus	4 Mar–7 Apr 2020	3,921	19.6	20.0	17.6	12.4	12.0	7.9	4.1	3.9	1.3	1.2	0.4	56	42.8
Tietoykkönen	20–27 Mar 2020	1,200	21.1	20.1	16.8	11.9	10.7	7.8	4.6	2.9	1.3	2.8	1.0	56.1	41.1
Kantar TNS	15 Feb–13 Mar 2020	2,234	17.1	21.6	16.9	12.0	12.4	8.0	4.4	3.7	1.9	2.0	4.5	53.9	44.1
Taloustutkimus	5 Feb–3 Mar 2020	3,409	16.6	22.4	18.0	12.4	12.5	7.4	4.1	2.9	1.7	2.0	4.4	53	45
Kantar TNS	19 Jan–14 Feb 2020	2,204	16.3	22.4	17.3	12.0	12.3	7.7	4.2	3.6	1.9	2.3	5.1	52.5	45.2
Tietoykkönen	21 Jan–10 Feb 2020	1,500	16.7	21.7	17.5	12.0	12.6	7.6	4.3	3.5	1.4	2.7	4.2	53.2	44.1
Taloustutkimus	13 Jan–4 Feb 2020	2,944	16.0	23.3	17.5	10.8	13.3	8.3	4.4	3.0	1.3	2.1	5.8	52.8	45.1
Kantar TNS	23 Dec 2019–17 Jan 2020	2,218	15.1	22.8	17.5	11.5	12.8	8.3	4.3	3.9	1.7	2.1	5.3	52	45.9
Taloustutkimus	9 Dec 2019–8 Jan 2020	1,461	14.9	24.3	19.3	12.0	12.0	8.1	3.9	2.2	1.4	1.9	5.0	50.9	47.2
Kantar TNS	25 Nov–20 Dec 2019	2,226	15.1	22.7	17.2	11.1	12.5	8.4	4.5	4.0	1.7	2.8	5.5	51.6	45.6
Taloustutkimus	11 Nov–3 Dec 2019	2,944	13.2	24.3	18.6	10.6	13.9	8.4	3.9	3.9	1.2	2.0	5.7	50	48
Kantar TNS	24 Oct–21 Nov 2019	2,314	15.2	22.4	17.3	11.7	13.1	7.9	4.3	3.8	1.6	2.7	5.1	52.2	45.1
Taloustutkimus	20 Oct–5 Nov 2019	2,397	13.9	23.0	17.3	12.9	14.2	7.9	4.3	3.2	1.6	1.6	5.7	53.2	45.1
Kantar TNS	23 Sep–21 Oct 2019	2,186	17.0	20.5	17.0	12.2	13.9	8.2	4.3	3.3	1.3	2.3	3.5	55.6	42.1
Tietoykkönen	17 Sep–8 Oct 2019	1,500	17.2	20.4	17.2	12.5	13.2	7.7	4.2	3.2	1.6	2.8	3.2	54.8	42.4
Taloustutkimus	9 Sep–1 Oct 2019	2,446	15.6	20.9	17.1	12.8	14.5	7.9	3.9	3.7	1.6	2.0	3.8	54.7	43.3
Kantar TNS	26 Aug–22 Sep 2019	2,236	17.3	19.8	17.3	11.9	14.2	8.2	4.4	3.4	1.5	2.0	2.5	56	42
Taloustutkimus	12 Aug–3 Sep 2019	2,440	16.9	20.6	17.4	11.6	14.6	8.1	3.8	3.4	1.4	2.2	3.2	55	42.8
Kantar TNS	29 Jul–23 Aug 2019	2,235	17.2	20.0	17.4	12.1	13.7	8.3	4.4	3.8	1.0	2.1	2.6	55.7	42.2
Taloustutkimus	8 Jul–6 Aug 2019	2,451	16.3	19.6	16.8	12.6	15.1	8.7	4.3	3.5	1.2	1.9	2.8	57	41.1
Kantar TNS	1–27 Jul 2019	2,248	16.5	20.7	16.7	12.2	14.0	8.1	4.5	3.9	1.1	2.3	4.0	55.3	42.4
Taloustutkimus	5 Jun–2 Jul 2019	2,446	16.1	19.7	16.8	11.7	14.3	8.8	4.6	3.8	1.7	2.5	2.9	55.5	42
Kantar TNS	3–28 Jun 2019	2,326	17.5	19.2	17.3	13.1	13.1	8.0	4.4	3.7	1.4	2.3	1.7	56.1	41.6
Tietoykkönen	4–14 Jun 2019	1,510	16.2	20.1	17.2	13.0	13.6	8.2	4.8	3.0	–	3.9	2.9	55.8	40.3
Taloustutkimus	13 May–4 Jun 2019	2,436	17.4	19.5	16.7	12.4	13.9	7.8	4.5	3.6	1.7	2.5	2.1	–	–
Kantar TNS	6 May–2 Jun 2019	2,314	17.5	18.2	17.5	13.2	12.2	8.5	4.5	3.9	2.1	2.4	0.7	–	–
EP election	26 May 2019	-	14.6	13.8	20.8	13.5	16.0	6.9	6.3	4.9	–	3.1	4.8	–	–
Tietoykkönen	3–14 May 2019	1,508	16.4	19.2	17.9	13.4	12.1	9.4	4.7	3.5	–	3.4	1.3	–	–
Taloustutkimus	15 Apr–7 May 2019	1,961	17.8	18.8	16.9	13.3	13.3	8.0	4.0	3.7	1.7	2.5	1.0	–	–
Kantar TNS	16 Apr–3 May 2019	1,505	16.9	18.7	17.1	12.7	12.8	8.3	4.4	4.1	2.5	2.0 (Note: SIN with 0.5%)	1.6	–	–
2019 election	14 Apr 2019	–	17.7	17.5	17.0	13.8	11.5	8.2	4.5	3.9	2.3	3.7	0.2	–	–

=== First time voters poll ===
Polling firm	Fieldwork date	Sample size	SDP	PS	KOK	KESK	VIHR	VAS	SFP	KD	LIIK	Others	No preference	Lead	Gov.	Opp.
Kantar Public	20 Jan – 7 Feb 2023	624	13	28	9	7	11	6	1	1	1	1	24	15	38	39

== By electoral district ==
=== Helsinki ===
Polling firm	Fieldwork date	Sample size	SDP	PS	KOK	KESK	VIHR	VAS	SFP	KD	LIIK	Others	Lead	Gov.	Opp.
Taloustutkimus	13 – 25 Mar 2023	1,726	20.8	13.0	22.2	-	15.4	14.2	5.2	-	2.2	6.9 (Note: KD's and KESK's alliance with 3.9%)	1.4	-	-
Tietoykkönen	6 – 14 Mar 2023	1,000	16.7	12.1	24.1	1.5	16.2	14.6	5.2	2.4	3.5	3.7	7.4	54.2	42.1
Tietoykkönen	30 Jan – 13 Feb 2023	1,000	14.8	11.2	25.5	1.7	18.8	14.3	4.8	3.0	1.6	4.3	6.7	54.4	41.3
2019 election	14 Apr 2019	–	13.6	12.3	21.8	2.9	23.5	11.1	5.3	1.9	3.5	4.1	1.7	–	–

=== Häme ===
Polling firm	Fieldwork date	Sample size	SDP	PS	KOK	KESK	VIHR	VAS	SFP	KD	LIIK	Others	Lead	Gov.	Opp.
Tietoykkönen	Feb 2023	TBA	23.1	24.7	21.4	8.2	6.8	6.7	–	5.1	–	4.0	1.6	44.8	51.2
2019 election	14 Apr 2019	–	24.0	21.0	19.2	10.2	8.4	7.4	0.2	5.7	1.6	2.5	3.0	–	–

=== Kaakkois-Suomi ===
Polling firm	Fieldwork date	Sample size	SDP	PS	KOK	KESK	VIHR	VAS	SFP	KD	LIIK	Others	Lead	Gov.	Opp.
Tietoykkönen	Feb 2023	TBA	22.5	21.6	21.6	13.4	6.0	4.9	–	3.9	2.3	3.8	0.9	46.8	49.4
2019 election	14 Apr 2019	–	24.4	18.9	18.1	16.6	9.4	4.2	–	4.4	1.6	2.3	5.5	–	–

=== Keski-Suomi ===
Polling firm	Fieldwork date	Sample size	SDP	PS	KOK	KESK	VIHR	VAS	SFP	KD	LIIK	Others	Lead	Gov.	Opp.
Tietoykkönen	2–10 Jan 2023	1,000	19.9	21.2	17.4	15.4	10.4	8.4	–	4.2	–	3.1	1.3	54.1	42.8
2019 election	14 Apr 2019	–	18.9	18.0	12.8	19.8	11.4	8.2	–	5.7	2.8	2.4	0.9	–	–

=== Pirkanmaa ===
Polling firm	Fieldwork date	Sample size	SDP	PS	KOK	KESK	VIHR	VAS	SFP	KD	LIIK	Others	Lead	Gov.	Opp.
2023 election	2 April 2023	–	25.9	20.2	21.5	7.1	7.5	6.9	0.3	5.5	2.6	2.7	4.4	47.7	49.8
Taloustutkimus	3–7 Mar 2023	1,097	23.5	20.4	17.8	7.5	9.7	10.4	0.3	5.9	1.6	2.8	3.1	51.4	45.7
2019 election	14 Apr 2019	–	22.1	17.3	18.5	8.9	12.4	8.1	0.1	5.7	2.4	4.4	3.6	–	–

=== Satakunta ===
Polling firm	Fieldwork date	Sample size	SDP	PS	KOK	KESK	VIHR	VAS	SFP	KD	LIIK	Others	Lead	Gov.	Opp.
Norstat Finland	TBA	TBA	20.0	31.9	14.0	14.6	3.8	10.4	–	3.2	–	2.1	11.9	48.8	49.1
2019 election	14 Apr 2019	–	25.2	24.1	14.1	16.7	6.0	10.0	0.1	2.7	–	0.9	1.1	–	–

=== Savo-Karjala ===
Polling firm	Fieldwork date	Sample size	SDP	PS	KOK	KESK	VIHR	VAS	SFP	KD	LIIK	Others	Lead	Gov.	Opp.
Tietoykkönen	2 Apr 2023	–	19.1	20.0	16.4	19.7	5.7	5.5	0.1	9.8	2.1	1.8	0.3	50	48.3
Tietoykkönen	7–22 Feb 2023	1,000	17.4	22.9	17.1	18.4	6.2	7.9	–	6.0	1.7	2.4	4.5	49.9	47.7
2019 election	14 Apr 2019	–	17.3	18.1	12.5	22.8	9.6	7.2	–	7.8	1.5	3.2	4.7	–	–

=== Uusimaa ===
Polling firm	Fieldwork date	Sample size	SDP	PS	KOK	KESK	VIHR	VAS	SFP	KD	LIIK	Others	Lead	Gov.	Opp.
Taloustutkimus	13–25 Mar 2023	1,726	20.5	18.3	24.7	4.6	9.6	5.6	7.6	2.6	2.3	4.2	4.2	47.9	47.9
Tietoykkönen	8–15 Mar 2023	1,200	18.5	21.1	22.3	5.0	9.3	5.6	7.2	3.5	3.3	4.2 (Note: LIB with 1.7%)	1.2	45.6	50.2
Tietoykkönen	1–14 Feb 2023	761	19.0	18.3	25.0	4.6	10.5	6.3	8.8	1.8	2.6	3.1	6.7	49.2	47.7
2019 election	14 Apr 2019	–	17.8	15.9	20.9	6.5	13.5	4.8	8.1	2.7	4.5	4.3	6.0	–	–

=== Varsinais-Suomi ===
Polling firm	Fieldwork date	Sample size	SDP	PS	KOK	KESK	VIHR	VAS	SFP	KD	LIIK	Others	Lead	Gov.	Opp.
2023 election	2 Apr 2023	–	18.1	20.0	23.0	8.4	7.0	11.6	4.9	2.8	2.4	1.9	3.0	50	47.7
Taloustutkimus	TBA	TBA	19.8	20.4	20.7	8.1	8.0	10.8	5.7	3.0	2.0	1.5	0.3	52.4	46.1
2019 election	14 Apr 2019	–	17.8	19.1	18.9	10.8	9.2	12.8	5.5	1.9	1.9	2.1	0.2	–	–

== See also ==
- Opinion polling for the 2019 Finnish parliamentary election
- Opinion polling for the 2015 Finnish parliamentary election
