= Anna Kontula =

Finnish sociologist and politician (born 1977)

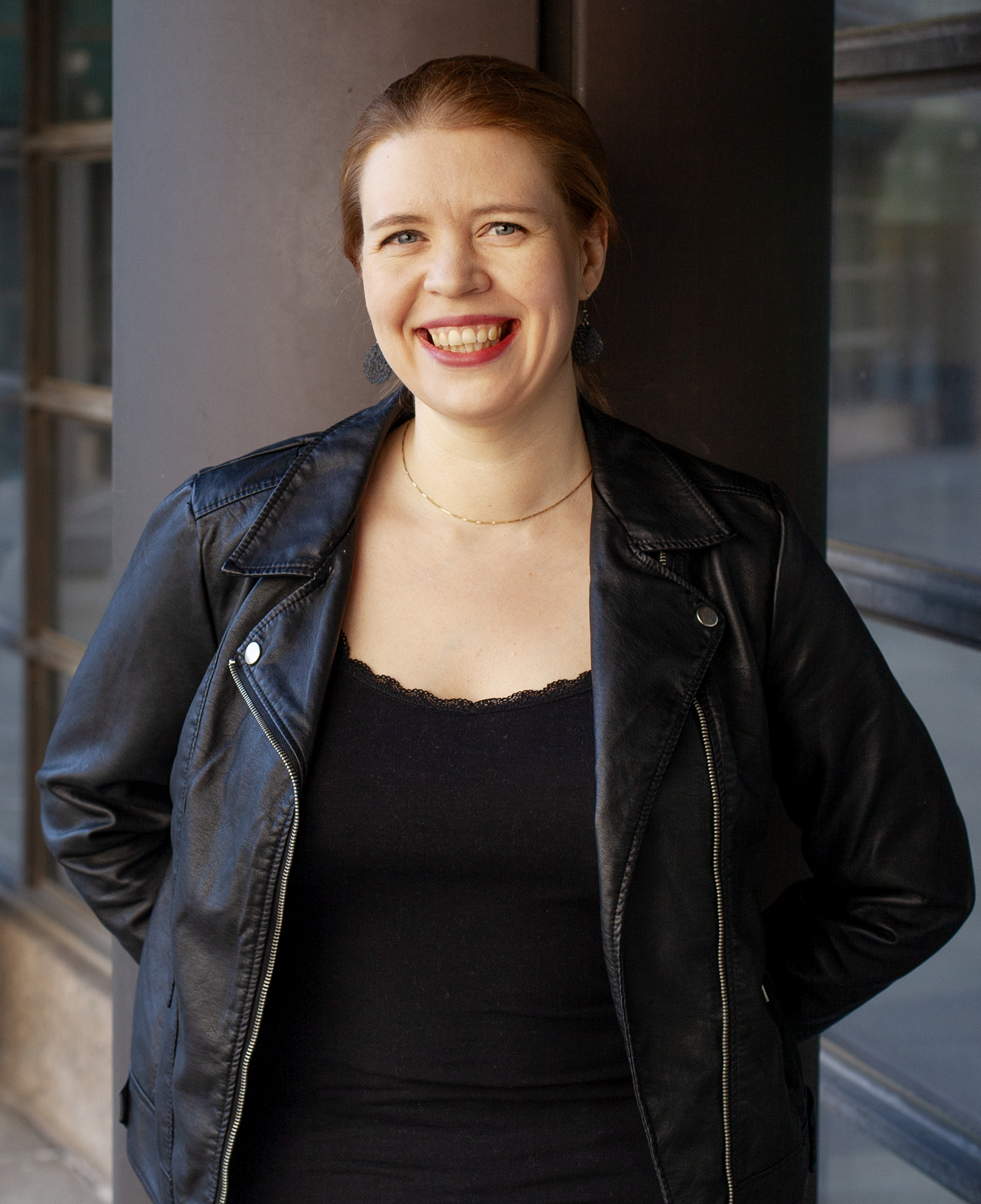
- Kontula in 2018

Member of the Finnish Parliament for Pirkanmaa
- Incumbent
- Assumed office 20 April 2011
- Parliamentary group: Left Alliance

Personal details
- Born: Anna Liisa Kontula; 30 March 1977 (age 49) Pori, Turku and Pori Province, Finland
- Party: Left Alliance
- Education: University of Tampere (Master of Political Science)
- Occupation: Researcher
- Website: http://annakontula.fi/

Anna Liisa Kontula (born 30 March 1977) is a Finnish sociologist and member of Parliament since 2011. In her work as a researcher, Kontula addressed the topic of sex work in Finland. On the same issue, she is the author of numerous articles Finnish and international journals, including a report on sex work in Finland. After her doctoral thesis, she focused on studying undocumented work in the construction industry.

Kontula's involvement in politics particularly concerned the sex workers' rights movement and included trade union and non-governmental organization activities, among others social programmes. She was part of Sitra's Future Makers group and of the working group on human trafficking established by the Ministry of Labour, as well as in drafting the follow-up report.

In addition to her research, Kontula is a columnist and blogger, whose interests include feminism, gender, and immigration policies, the transformation of working life, and the future of the trade union movement. During her tenure in the Finnish Parliament, she described herself as a communist, was critical of NATO, and took pro-Palestinian views, which resulted in her arrest in Israel during a 2020 demonstration to highlight the humanitarian crisis in the Gaza Strip. Until 2017, she was also a member of the city council of Tampere, where she was first elected in 2004 at the start of her political career. In 2023, she announced she would not run in the 2027 Finnish parliamentary election.

== Early life and career ==
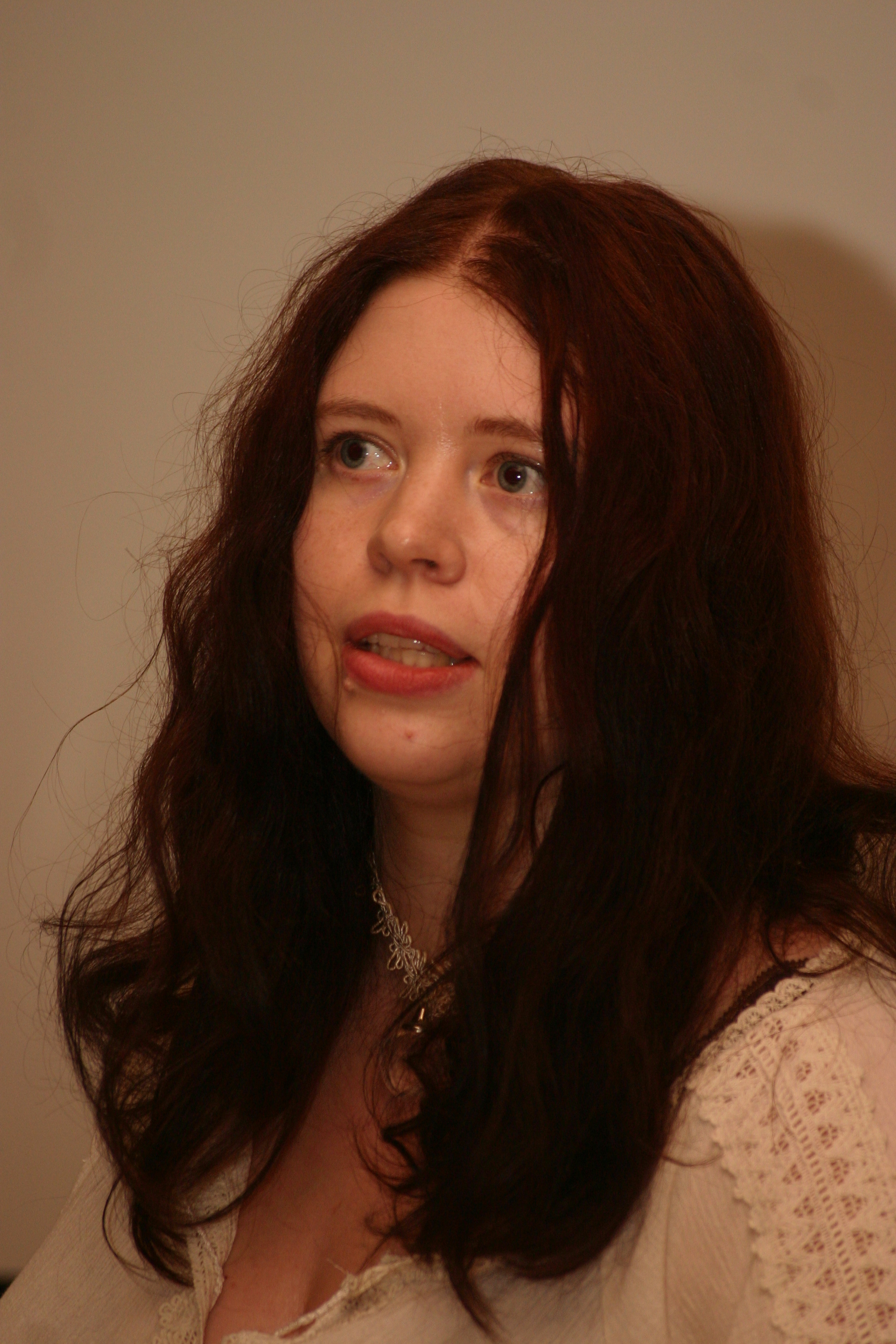
Kuntula in 2007

Kontula was born on 30 March 1977 in Pori, Satakunta, Finland. She completed her master's thesis in 2002 concerning the student movement of the 1970s and later also completed multiple research projects on prostitution in Finland, such as a 2008 report published by the University of Tampere and her PhD thesis. Her work included evaluating the criminalization of prostitution and violence toward women.

A 2003 and 2008 sociologist graduate (Master's and PhD) from the University of Tampere, Kuntola researched many subjects, including among other topics the evaluation of work restrictions, cultural norms, and perceptions, such as attitudes towards breastfeeding in public, aging construction workers, and the impact of racism in the workplace and in housing. She served as the vice chairman of the Sex Industry Association, and was involved in many organizations dealing with social activism during her school years. Kontula, who has studied prostitution, supports a system in which procuring and human trafficking are criminalized but buying and selling sex are not. According to Kontula, she herself worked as a prostitute at the age of 16. Her 2009 pamphlet Tästä äiti varoitti herätti runsaasti mielenkiintoa (This Is What My Mother Warned About), which was published by Like, attracted significant interest.

== Political career ==
In 2004, Kontula was elected in the municipal elections to the Tampere City Council. In 2008, she was elected again, On both the 2008 and the 2012 elections, Kontula had the second-largest number of votes of any Left Alliance candidate. Kontula was first elected to the Finnish Parliament on 20 April 2011, representing the Pirkanmaa constituency from the Left Alliance. She became a member of the Committee for the Future and the Employment and Equality Committee, and previously served on the Constitutional Law Committee and the Employment and Equality Committee.

In 2019, Kontula declared herself the only communist in the Finnish Parliament and predicted that the capitalist economic system would collapse. On 13 January 2020, Kontula was arrested along with other members of an international group of human rights activists near the Gaza Strip in Israel for trying to pass through a border fence. She said the group's aim was to bring attention to the humanitarian crisis in Gaza by crossing the border between Israel and Gaza. Taneli Hämäläinen, Kontula's parliamentary assistant, said on the next day that Kontula had been released after more than ten hours in custody and that the Israeli authorities had tried to press her to sign a statement that acknowledged the charges against her, such as obstructing the investigation and jeopardizing public safety; however, she refused to sign the document. In April 2023, Kontula announced that she would not run for re-election. Having opposed Finland's NATO membership, she also said it would have been better "if we had not applied", arguing that Finland's membership process showed the fragility of NATO's unanimity. Between 4 and 6 September 2024, she became a member of the Presidential Council, member of the Administrative Committee, member and chairman of the Future Committee, member of Yleisradio Oy's Supervisory Board, and member of the Forum for International Affairs.

== Personal life ==
Kontula enjoys cooking, caring for turtles, dancing, and children's culture.

== Selected works ==
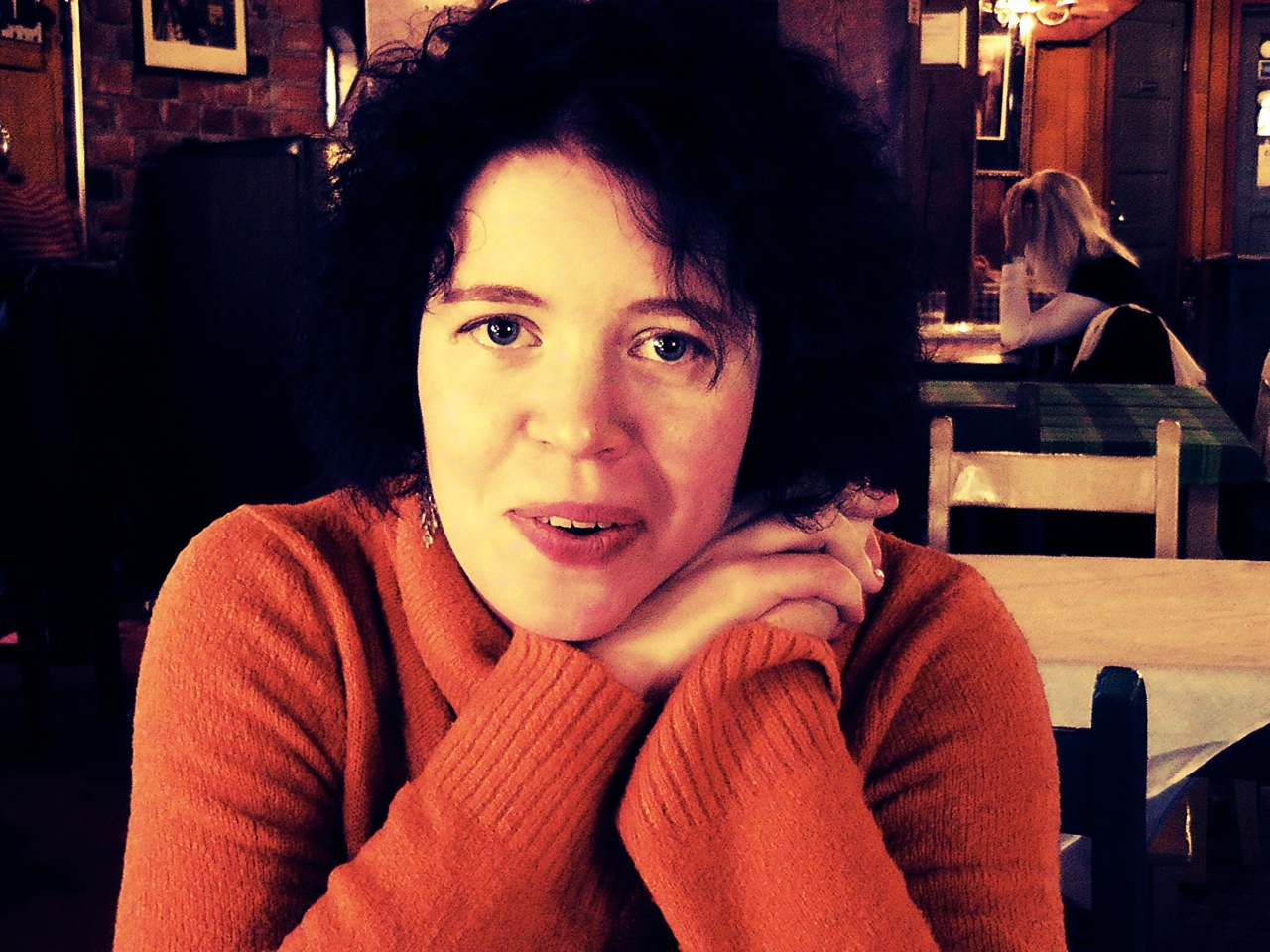
Kontula in 2010

- — (2002). Kuollut muttei kuopattu: taistolaisuus ja miten sitä muistetaan (Master's thesis) (in Finnish). Tampere: University of Tampere.
- — (2005). Prostituutio Suomessa (in Finnish). Helsinki: Sexpo-säätiö. ISBN 951-95548-4-X.
- — (2008). Punainen eksodus (PhD thesis) (in Finnish). Helsinki: Like.
- — (2008). "The Sex Worker and Her Pleasure". The Sex Worker and Her Pleasure. 56 (4): 605–620. doi:10.1177/0011392108090944.
- — (2008). Punainen eksodus: tutkimus seksityöstä Suomessa (in Finnish). Helsinki: Like. ISBN 978-952-01-0212-8.
- — (2009). Tästä äiti varoitti: herätti runsaasti mielenkiintoa (in Finnish). Helsinki: Like. ISBN 978-952-01-0299-9.
- — (2009). Countering Trafficking in Moldova. Chisinau: International Organization for Migration.
- — (2010). Näkymätön kylä: Siirtotyöläisten asemasta Suomessa (in Finnish). Helsinki: Like. ISBN 978-952-01-0522-8.
- — (2012). Mistä ei voi puhua (in Finnish). Helsinki: Like. ISBN 978-952-264-183-0.
- — (2014). Kirjeitä oikealle (in Finnish). Helsinki: Into. ISBN 978-952-264-271-4.
