= 2027 Finnish parliamentary election =

- 18 April 2027

All 200 seats in the Parliament of Finland 101 seats needed for a majority
- Opinion polls
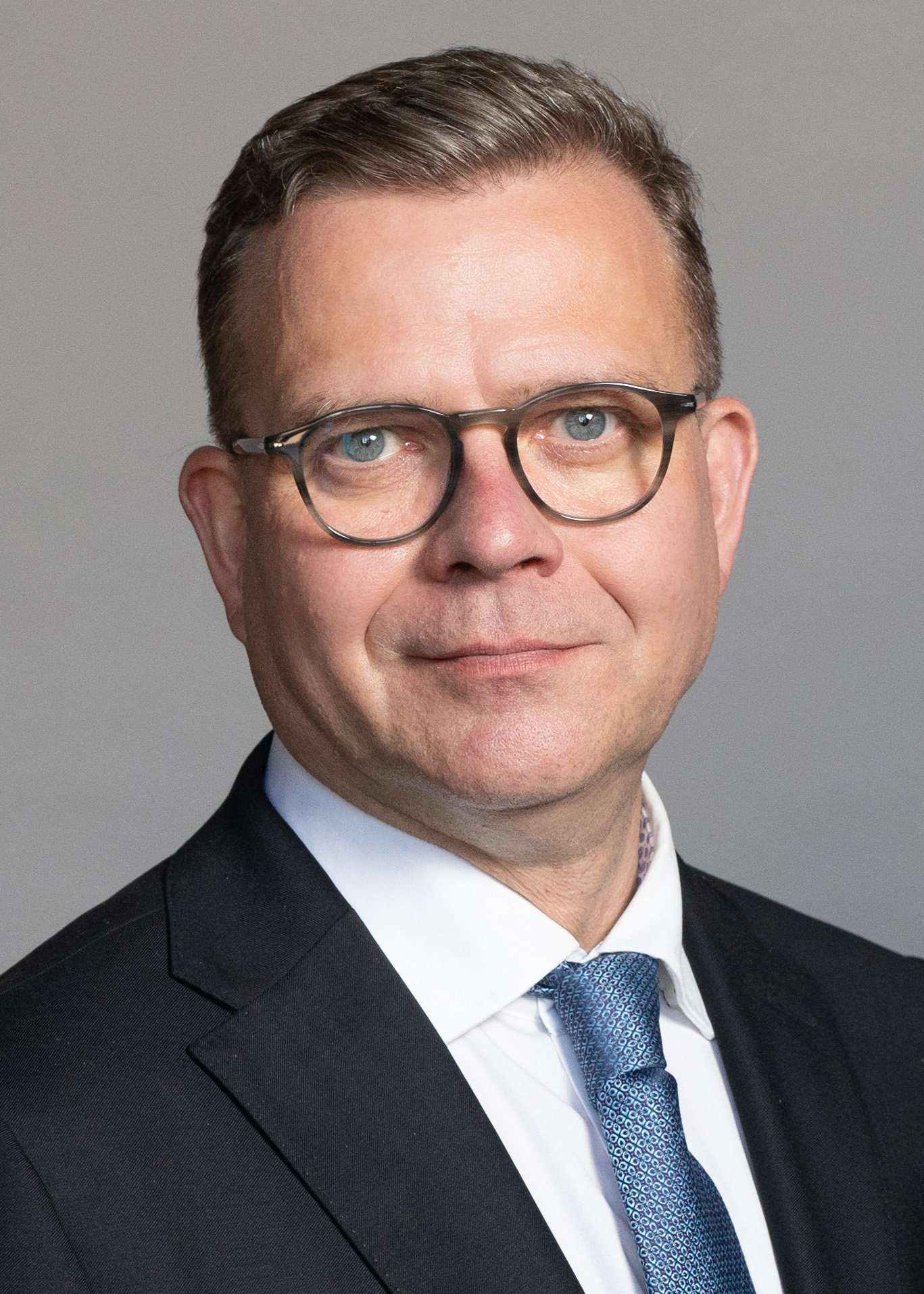

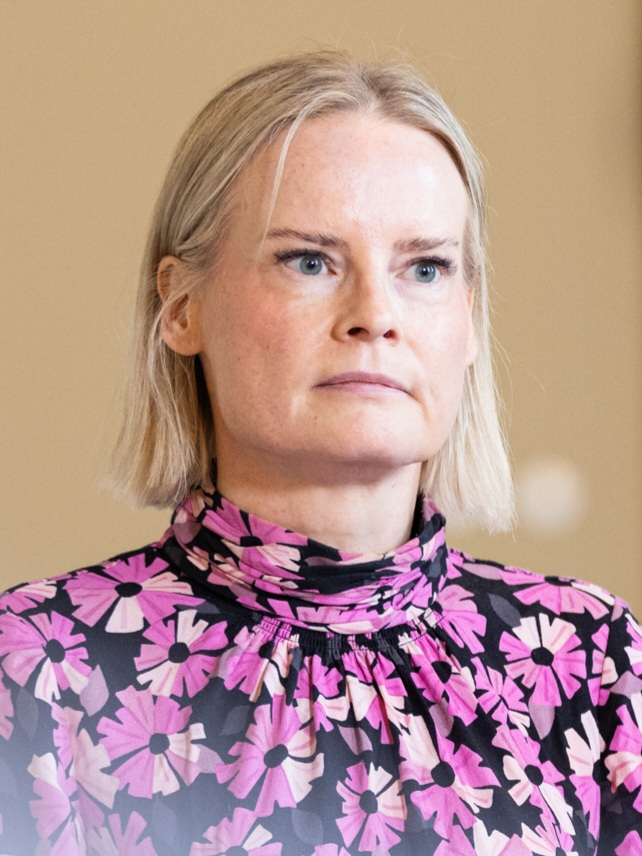

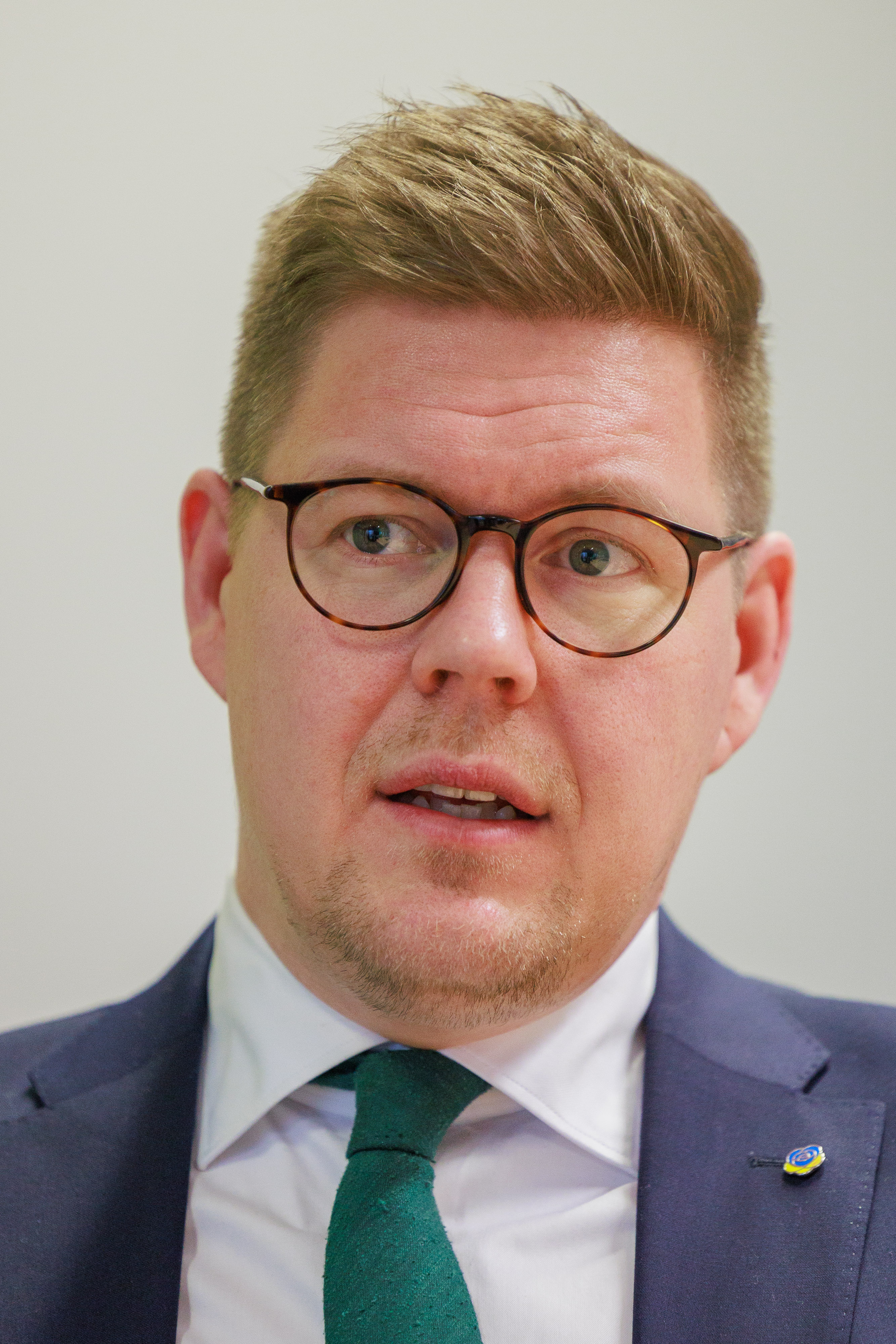

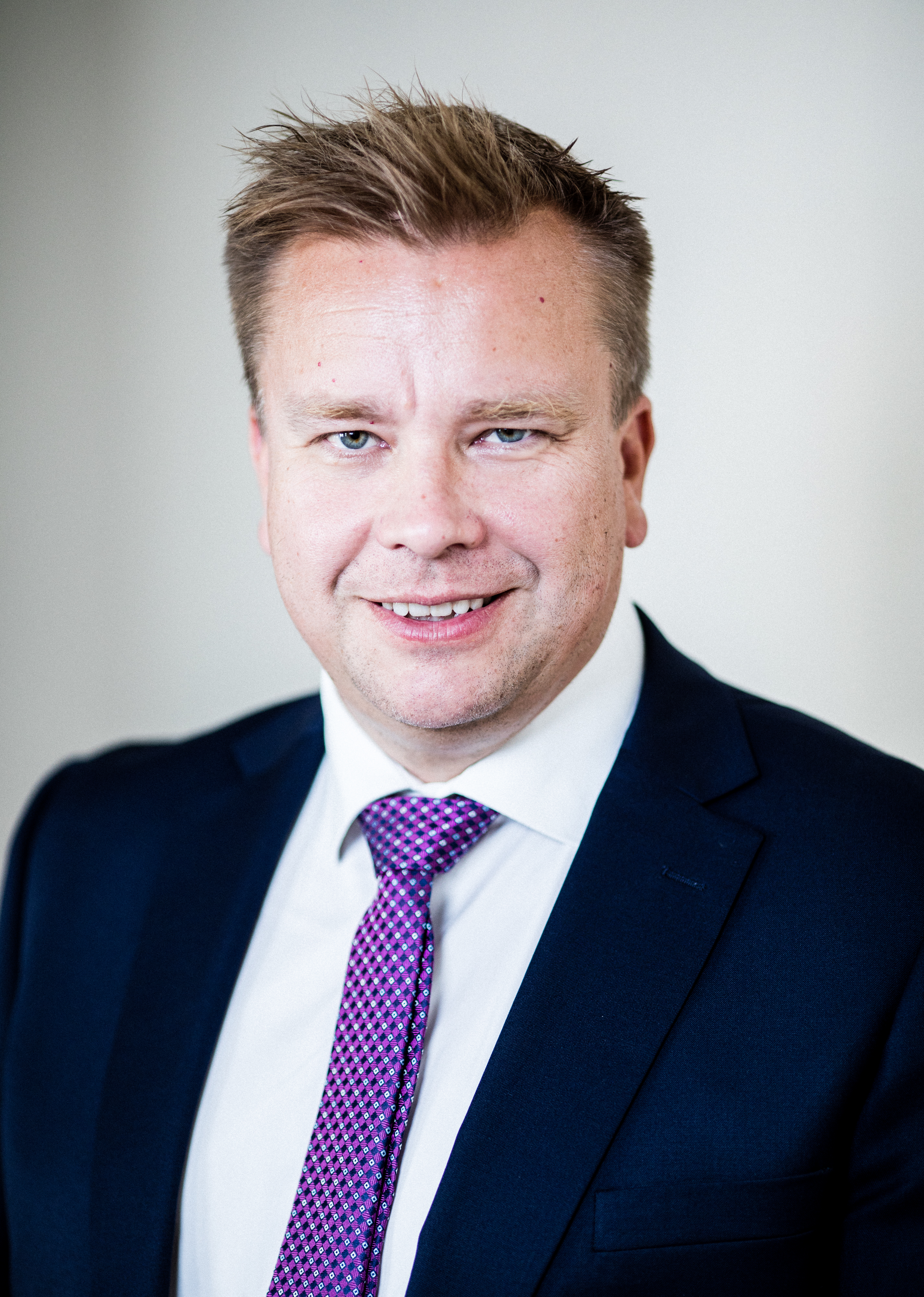

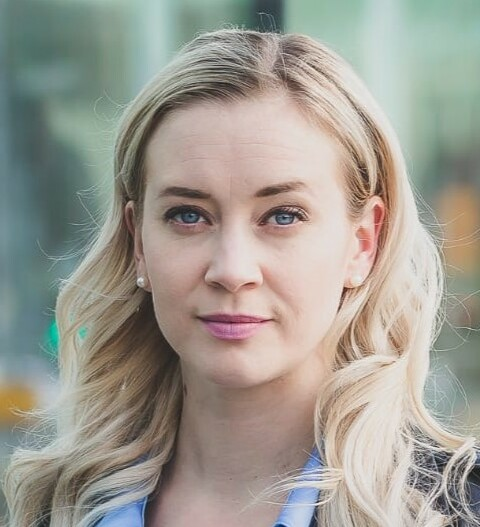

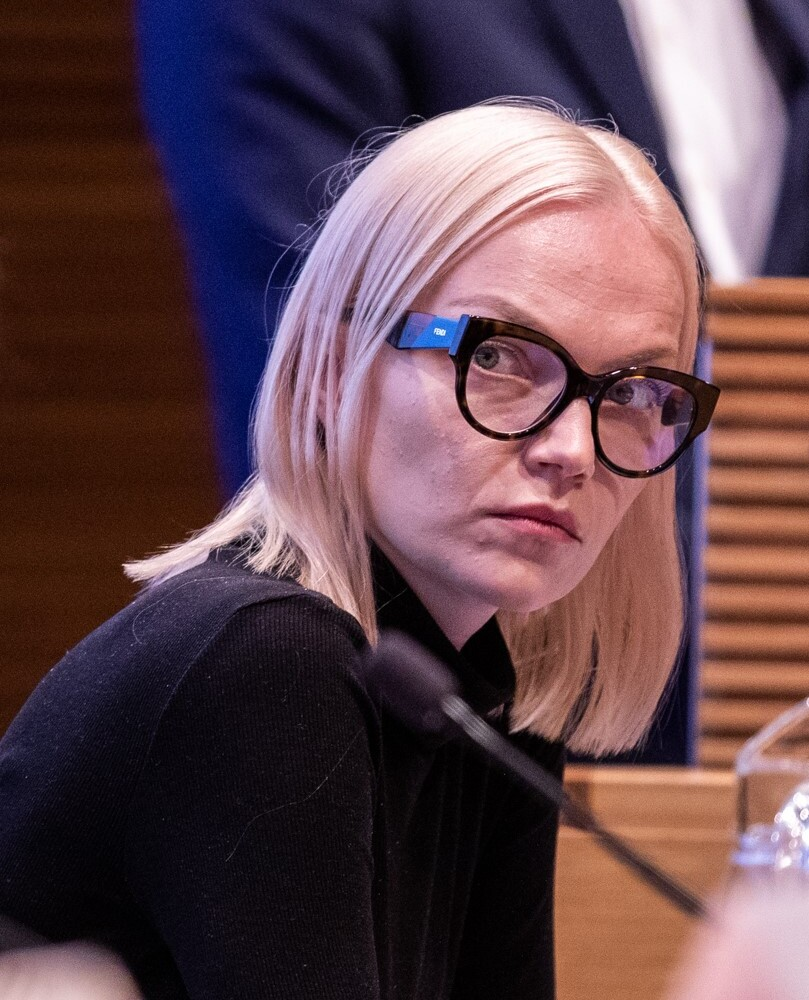

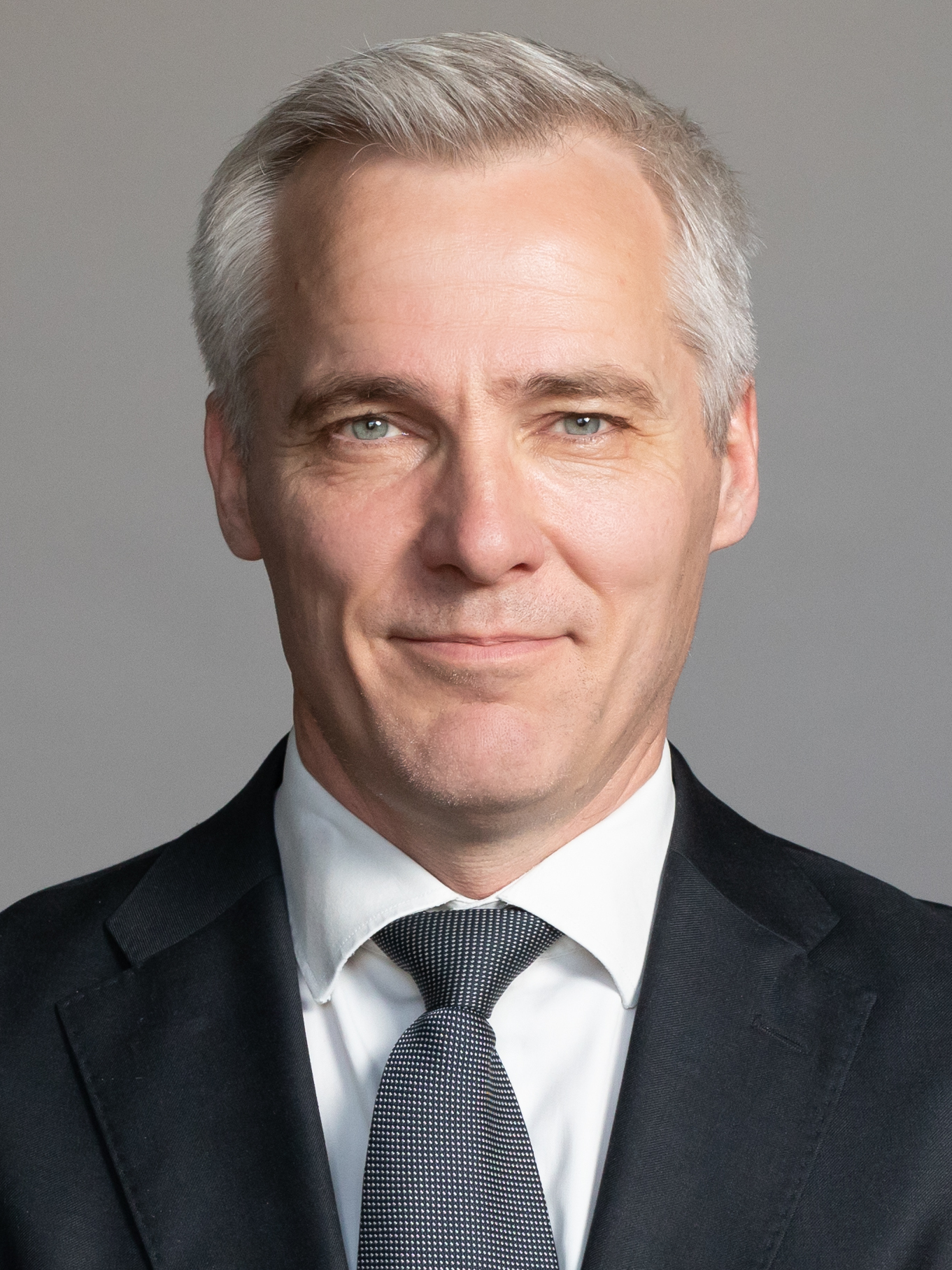

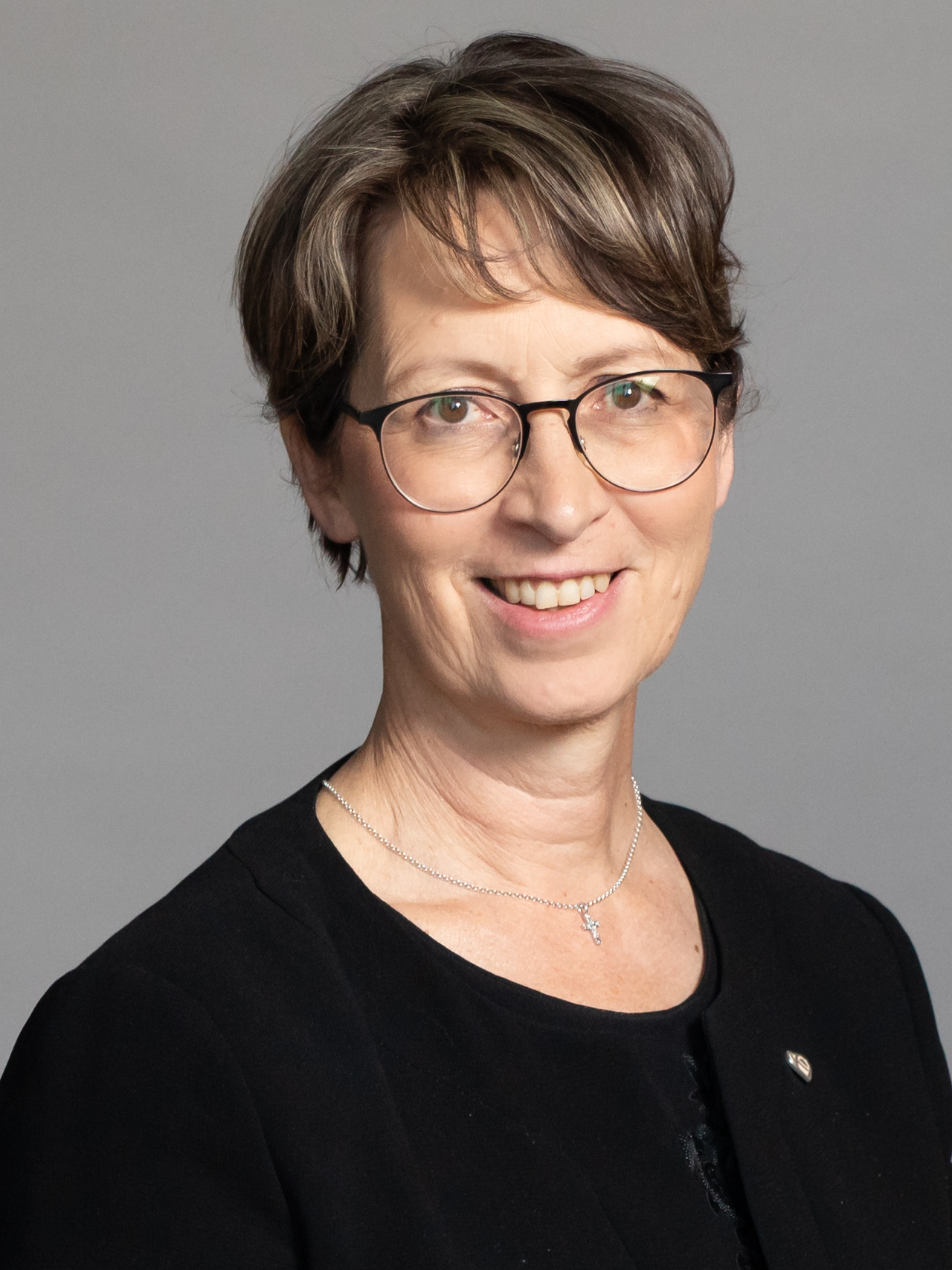

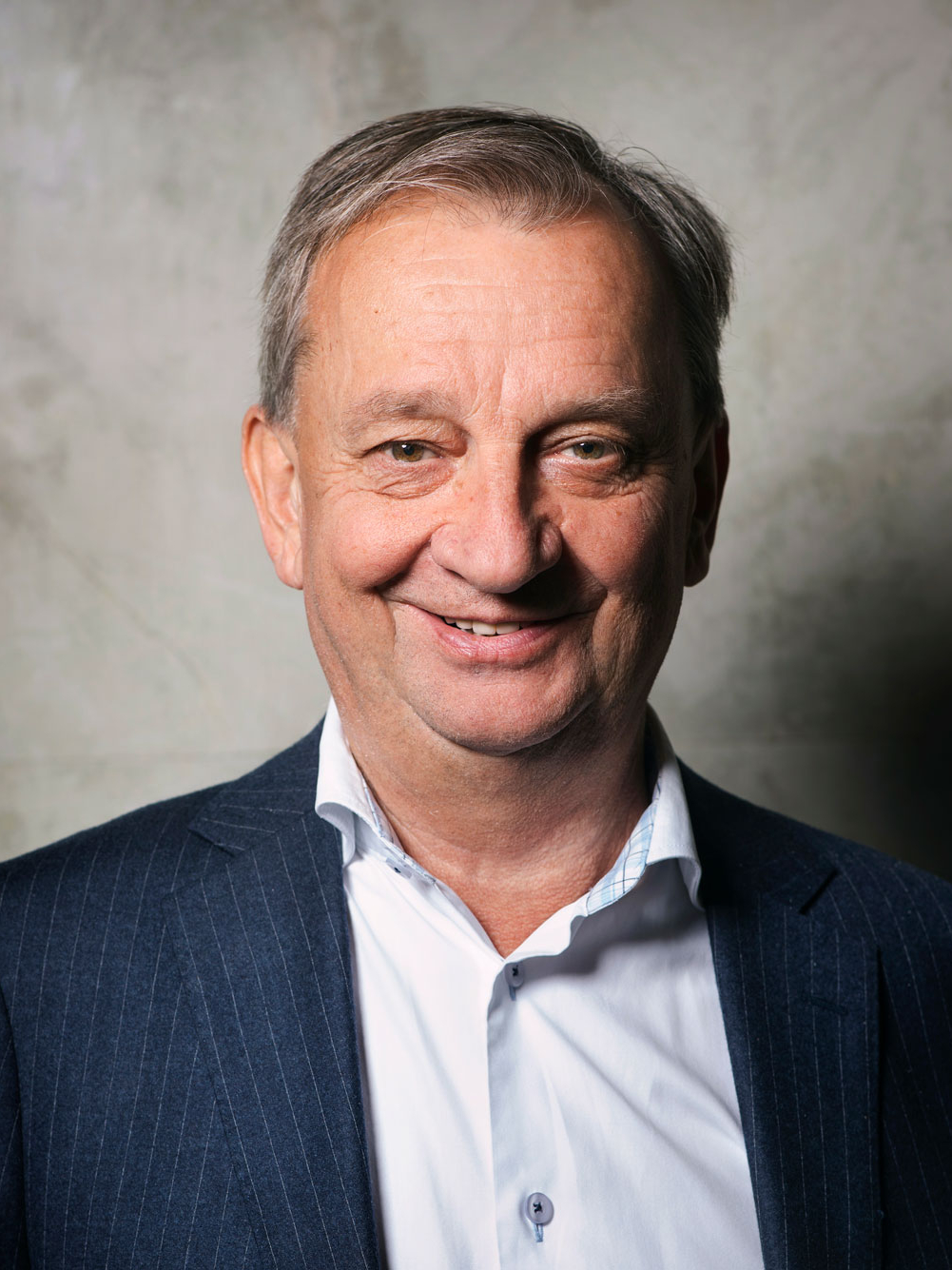
Leader	Petteri Orpo	Riikka Purra	Antti Lindtman
Party	National Coalition	Finns	SDP
Last election	20.8%, 48 seats	20.1%, 46 seats	19.9%, 43 seats
Current seats	48	45	43
Leader	Antti Kaikkonen	Sofia Virta	Minja Koskela
Party	Centre	Green	Left Alliance
Last election	11.3%, 23 seats	7.0%, 13 seats	7.1%, 11 seats
Current seats	23	13	11
Leader	Anders Adlercreutz	Sari Essayah	Harry Harkimo
Party	RKP	KD	Liik
Last election	4.3%, 9 seats	4.2%, 5 seats	2.4%, 1 seat
Current seats	9	5	1
Incumbent Prime Minister
Petteri Orpo
National Coalition

Parliamentary elections will be held in Finland on 18 April 2027 to elect members of parliament for the 2027–2031 term. It will be the first parliamentary election in Finland since the country acceded to NATO on 4 April 2023, ending 75 years of military non-alignment for the country.

== Electoral system ==
The 200 members of the Parliament of Finland (Eduskunta) are elected using open list proportional representation in 13 multi-member constituencies, with seats allocated according to the D'Hondt method. The number of elected representatives is proportional to the population in the district six months prior to the elections. Åland has a single member electoral district and its own party system.

== Members of Parliament standing down ==
=== Left Alliance ===
- Anna Kontula

=== Social Democratic Party ===
- Sanna Marin (resigned in September 2023)
