= Opinion polling for the 2015 Finnish parliamentary election =

In the run up to the 2015 Finnish legislative election, various organisations carried out opinion polling to gauge voting intention in Finland. Results of such polls are displayed in this article.

The date range for these opinion polls are from the previous general election, held on 17 April 2011, to the day the next election was held, on 19 April 2015.

== Graphical summary ==
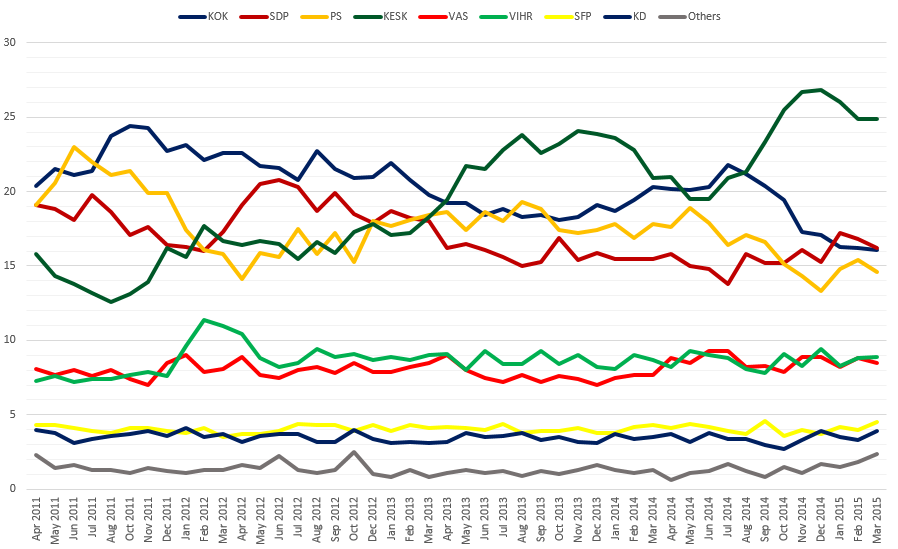
Taloustutkimus opinion polling since 2011 election.

== Poll results ==
Poll results are listed in the table below in reverse chronological order, showing the most recent first. The highest percentage figure in each poll is displayed in bold, and the background shaded in the leading party's colour. In the instance that there is a tie, then no figure is shaded. The table uses the date the survey's fieldwork was done, as opposed to the date of publication. However, if that date is unknown, the date of publication will be given instead.

| Date | Polling Firm | KOK | SDP | PS | KESK | VAS | VIHR | SFP | KD | Others | Lead |
|---|---|---|---|---|---|---|---|---|---|---|---|
| 23 Mar–15 Apr | Taloustutkimus | 16.9 | 15.1 | 16.7 | **24.0** | 8.3 | 8.8 | 4.6 | 3.5 | 2.0 | 7.1 |
| 8 Apr–12 Apr | TNS Gallup | 17.0 | 17.0 | 16.2 | **23.0** | 8.5 | 8.1 | 4.6 | 3.7 | 1.9 | 6.0 |
| 27 Mar–1 Apr | Tietoykkönen | 16.2 | 17.0 | 16.6 | **23.5** | 8.4 | 8.1 | 4.3 | 4.1 | 1.8 | 6.5 |
| 25 Feb–19 Mar | Taloustutkimus | 16.1 | 16.2 | 14.6 | **24.9** | 8.5 | 8.9 | 4.5 | 3.9 | 2.4 | 8.7 |
| 16 Feb–12 Mar | TNS Gallup | 16.8 | 16.9 | 15.2 | **24.7** | 8.4 | 8.6 | 4.2 | 3.3 | 1.9 | 7.8 |
| 5–11 Mar | Tietoykkönen | 17.3 | 16.4 | 16.8 | **23.5** | 8.3 | 8.2 | 4.1 | 3.6 | 1.7 | 6.2 |
| 2–24 Feb | Taloustutkimus | 16.2 | 16.8 | 15.4 | **24.9** | 8.8 | 8.8 | 4.0 | 3.3 | 1.8 | 8.1 |
| 19 Jan–12 Feb | TNS Gallup | 16.9 | 17.1 | 14.1 | **26.2** | 8.5 | 8.3 | 4.2 | 3.2 | 1.5 | 9.3 |
| 28 Jan-3 Feb | Tietoykkönen | 17.8 | 16.5 | 15.3 | **25.4** | 8.2 | 7.8 | 4.0 | 3.6 | 1.4 | 7.6 |
| 29 Dec–27 Jan | Taloustutkimus | 16.3 | 17.2 | 14.8 | **26.0** | 8.2 | 8.3 | 4.2 | 3.5 | 1.5 | 8.8 |
| 15 Dec–15 Jan | TNS Gallup | 17.2 | 16.5 | 14.5 | **25.9** | 8.8 | 8.4 | 4.1 | 3.3 | 1.3 | 8.7 |
2014
| 3–27 Dec | Taloustutkimus | 17.1 | 15.3 | 13.3 | **26.8** | 8.9 | 9.4 | 3.7 | 3.9 | 1.7 | 9.7 |
| 17 Nov-12 Dec | TNS Gallup | 16.7 | 16.9 | 14.2 | **26.1** | 8.1 | 8.9 | 4.2 | 3.5 | 1.4 | 9.2 |
| 3 Nov-2 Dec | Taloustutkimus | 17.3 | 16.1 | 14.3 | **26.7** | 8.9 | 8.3 | 4.0 | 3.3 | 1.1 | 9.4 |
| 23 Nov-26 Nov | Tietoykkönen | 17.7 | 15.8 | 15.7 | **26.6** | 8.4 | 8.1 | 3.1 | 2.9 | 1.7 | 8.9 |
| 21 Nov | TNS Gallup | 17.4 | 16.4 | 16.2 | **24.5** | 8.0 | 8.3 | 4.3 | 3.6 | 1.3 | 7.1 |
| 30 Sep-28 Oct | Taloustutkimus | 19.4 | 15.2 | 15.1 | **25.5** | 7.9 | 9.1 | 3.6 | 2.7 | 1.5 | 6.1 |
| 22 Sep-16 Oct | TNS Gallup | 19.4 | 16.2 | 16.1 | **22.3** | 8.7 | 8.2 | 4.2 | 3.6 | 1.3 | 2.9 |
| 10 Oct-16 Oct | Tietoykkönen | 18.5 | 15.1 | 16.5 | **23.4** | 8.0 | 8.9 | 4.2 | 3.8 | 1.6 | 4.9 |
| 2 Sep-25 Sep | Taloustutkimus | 20.4 | 15.2 | 16.6 | **23.3** | 8.3 | 7.8 | 4.6 | 3.0 | 0.8 | 2.9 |
| 21 Aug-26 Aug | Tietoykkönen | 20.8 | 14.7 | 16.0 | **21.3** | 9.9 | 8.4 | 4.1 | 3.1 | 1.7 | 0.5 |
| 5 Aug-28 Aug | Taloustutkimus | 21.2 | 15.8 | 17.1 | **21.3** | 8.2 | 8.1 | 3.7 | 3.4 | 1.2 | 0.1 |
| 15 Jul–12 Aug | TNS Gallup | **22.1** | 14.9 | 15.9 | 19.9 | 9.3 | 8.7 | 4.5 | 3.4 | 1.3 | 2.2 |
| 1 Jul-30 Jul | Taloustutkimus | **21.8** | 13.8 | 16.4 | 20.9 | 9.3 | 8.8 | 3.9 | 3.4 | 1.7 | 0.9 |
| 2 Jun–25 Jun | Taloustutkimus | **20.3** | 14.8 | 17.9 | 19.5 | 9.3 | 9.0 | 4.2 | 3.8 | 1.2 | 0.8 |
| 26 May–11 Jun | TNS Gallup | **20.5** | 14.9 | 17.2 | 20.3 | 9.0 | 8.5 | 4.4 | 3.9 | 1.3 | 0.2 |
| 5–27 May | Taloustutkimus | **20.1** | 15.0 | 18.9 | 19.5 | 8.5 | 9.3 | 4.4 | 3.2 | 1.1 | 0.6 |
| 2–29 Apr | Taloustutkimus | 20.2 | 15.8 | 17.6 | **21.0** | 8.8 | 8.2 | 4.1 | 3.7 | 0.6 | 0.8 |
| 5 Mar–1 Apr | Taloustutkimus | 20.3 | 15.5 | 17.8 | **20.9** | 7.7 | 8.7 | 4.3 | 3.5 | 1.3 | 0.6 |
| 25 Feb–22 Mar | TNS Gallup | 19.5 | 16.3 | 17.2 | **21.5** | 7.5 | 8.9 | 4.3 | 3.5 | 1.3 | 2.0 |
| 3 Feb–4 Mar | Taloustutkimus | 19.4 | 15.5 | 16.9 | **22.8** | 7.7 | 9.0 | 4.2 | 3.4 | 1.1 | 3.4 |
| 13 Jan–8 Feb | TNS Gallup | 19.2 | 16.2 | 17.0 | **22.4** | 7.6 | 8.5 | 4.2 | 3.5 | 1.4 | 3.2 |
| 1–28 Jan | Taloustutkimus | 18.7 | 15.5 | 17.8 | **23.6** | 7.5 | 8.1 | 3.8 | 3.7 | 1.3 | 4.9 |
2013
| 27 Nov–23 Dec | Taloustutkimus | 19.1 | 15.9 | 17.4 | **23.9** | 7.0 | 8.2 | 3.8 | 3.1 | 1.6 | 4.8 |
| 19 Dec | TNS Gallup | 18.0 | 16.7 | 17.5 | **23.0** | 7.9 | 7.9 | 4.4 | 3.3 | 1.3 | 5.0 |
| 30 Oct–26 Nov | Taloustutkimus | 18.3 | 15.4 | 17.2 | **24.1** | 7.4 | 9.0 | 4.1 | 3.2 | 1.3 | 5.8 |
| 7–29 Oct | Taloustutkimus | 18.1 | 16.9 | 17.4 | **23.2** | 7.6 | 8.4 | 3.9 | 3.5 | 1.0 | 5.1 |
| 23 Oct | TNS Gallup | 18.2 | 16.2 | 18.9 | **21.8** | 7.7 | 8.3 | 4.4 | 3.4 | 1.1 | 2.9 |
| 9 Sep–2 Oct | Taloustutkimus | 18.4 | 15.3 | 18.8 | **22.6** | 7.2 | 9.3 | 3.9 | 3.3 | 1.2 | 3.8 |
| 6 Aug–4 Sep | Taloustutkimus | 18.3 | 15.0 | 19.3 | **23.8** | 7.7 | 8.4 | 3.8 | 2.8 | 0.9 | 4.5 |
| 15 Aug | TNS Gallup | 18.7 | 16.3 | 18.7 | **21.9** | 7.3 | 8.2 | 4.2 | 3.5 | 1.2 | 3.2 |
| 2–31 Jul | Taloustutkimus | 18.8 | 15.6 | 18.0 | **22.8** | 7.2 | 8.4 | 4.4 | 3.6 | 1.2 | 4.0 |
| 29 May–26 Jun | Taloustutkimus | 18.4 | 16.1 | 18.6 | **21.5** | 7.5 | 9.3 | 4.0 | 3.5 | 1.1 | 2.9 |
| 29 Apr–28 May | Taloustutkimus | 19.2 | 16.5 | 17.4 | **21.7** | 8.0 | 8.0 | 4.1 | 3.8 | 1.3 | 2.5 |
| 4–25 Apr | Taloustutkimus | 19.2 | 16.2 | 18.6 | **19.4** | 9.0 | 9.1 | 4.2 | 3.2 | 1.1 | 0.2 |
| 11–27 Mar | Taloustutkimus | **19.8** | 18.0 | 18.4 | 18.3 | 8.5 | 9.0 | 4.1 | 3.1 | 0.8 | 1.4 |
| 11 Feb–7 Mar | Taloustutkimus | **20.8** | 18.2 | 18.1 | 17.2 | 8.2 | 8.7 | 4.3 | 3.2 | 1.3 | 2.6 |
| 7–29 Jan | Taloustutkimus | **21.9** | 18.7 | 17.7 | 17.1 | 7.9 | 8.9 | 3.9 | 3.1 | 0.8 | 3.2 |
2012
| 3–27 Dec | Taloustutkimus | **21.0** | 17.9 | 18.0 | 17.8 | 7.9 | 8.7 | 4.3 | 3.4 | 1.0 | 3.0 |
| 1–24 Oct | Taloustutkimus | **20.9** | 18.5 | 15.3 | 17.3 | 8.5 | 9.1 | 3.9 | 4.0 | 2.5 | 2.4 |
| 3–19 Sep | Taloustutkimus | **21.5** | 19.9 | 17.2 | 15.9 | 7.8 | 8.9 | 4.3 | 3.2 | 1.3 | 1.6 |
| 7–29 Aug | Taloustutkimus | **22.7** | 18.7 | 15.8 | 16.6 | 8.2 | 9.4 | 4.3 | 3.2 | 1.1 | 4.0 |
| 3 Jul–1 Aug | Taloustutkimus | **20.8** | 20.3 | 17.5 | 15.5 | 8.0 | 8.5 | 4.4 | 3.7 | 1.3 | 0.5 |
| 4–27 Jun | Taloustutkimus | **21.6** | 20.8 | 15.6 | 16.5 | 7.5 | 8.2 | 3.9 | 3.7 | 2.2 | 0.8 |
| 7–31 May | Taloustutkimus | **21.7** | 20.5 | 15.9 | 16.7 | 7.7 | 8.8 | 3.7 | 3.6 | 1.4 | 1.2 |
| 3–26 Apr | Taloustutkimus | **22.6** | 19.1 | 14.1 | 16.4 | 8.9 | 10.4 | 3.7 | 3.2 | 1.6 | 3.5 |
| 5–29 Mar | Taloustutkimus | **22.6** | 17.3 | 15.8 | 16.7 | 8.1 | 11.0 | 3.5 | 3.7 | 1.3 | 5.3 |
| 30 Jan–23 Feb | Taloustutkimus | **22.1** | 16.0 | 16.1 | 17.7 | 7.9 | 11.4 | 4.1 | 3.5 | 1.3 | 4.4 |
| 2–26 Jan | Taloustutkimus | **23.1** | 16.3 | 17.4 | 15.6 | 9.0 | 9.6 | 3.8 | 4.1 | 1.1 | 5.8 |
2011
| 7–28 Dec | Taloustutkimus | **22.7** | 16.4 | 19.9 | 16.2 | 8.5 | 7.6 | 3.9 | 3.6 | 1.2 | 2.8 |
| 9–17 Nov | Taloustutkimus | **24.3** | 17.6 | 19.9 | 13.9 | 7.0 | 7.9 | 4.1 | 3.9 | 1.4 | 4.4 |
| 10 Oct–3 Nov | Taloustutkimus | **24.4** | 17.1 | 21.4 | 13.1 | 7.4 | 7.7 | 4.1 | 3.7 | 1.1 | 3.0 |
| 15 Aug–13 Sep | Taloustutkimus | **23.7** | 18.6 | 21.1 | 12.6 | 8.0 | 7.4 | 3.8 | 3.6 | 1.3 | 2.6 |
| 5 Jul–10 Aug | Taloustutkimus | 21.4 | 19.8 | **22.0** | 13.2 | 7.6 | 7.4 | 3.9 | 3.4 | 1.3 | 0.6 |
| 6–29 Jun | Taloustutkimus | 21.1 | 18.1 | **23.0** | 13.8 | 8.0 | 7.2 | 4.1 | 3.1 | 1.6 | 1.9 |
| 9–31 May | Taloustutkimus | **21.5** | 18.8 | 20.6 | 14.3 | 7.7 | 7.6 | 4.3 | 3.8 | 1.4 | 0.9 |
| **17 Apr 2011** | **Election Results** | **20.4** | **19.1** | **19.1** | **15.8** | **8.1** | **7.3** | **4.3** | **4.0** | **2.3** | **1.3** |

=== Seats ===
Opinion polls showing seat projections are displayed in the table below. The highest seat figures in each polling survey have their background shaded in the leading party's colour. In the instance that there is a tie, then no figure is shaded. 101 seats are required for an absolute majority in the Finnish Parliament.

101 seats needed for majority
| Date | Polling Firm | KOK | SDP | PS | KESK | VAS | VIHR | SFP | KD | Others |
|---|---|---|---|---|---|---|---|---|---|---|
| 19 Apr 2015 | ScenariPolitici (Note: Counted by ScenariPolitici, but based on various polls by different polling firms. Åland's MP is the other.) | 36 | 34 | 35 | 51 | 15 | 15 | 8 | 5 | 1 |
| 21 Mar 2015 | Accuscore (Note: Counted by Accuscore, but based on various polls by different polling firms. Åland's MP is the other.) | 34 | 35 | 36 | 53 | 16 | 14 | 9 | 2 | 1 |
| 3 Nov 2014–19 Mar 2015 | Taloustutkimus (Note: Not a single poll, but based on five separate Taloustutkimus polls. Åland's MP is the other.) | 33 | 35 | 31 | 56 | 17 | 15 | 8 | 4 | 1 |
| 14 Mar 2015 | Accuscore | 34 | 34 | 36 | 55 | 16 | 14 | 8 | 2 | 1 |
| 26 Feb 2015 | Accuscore | 34 | 34 | 36 | 56 | 16 | 14 | 8 | 1 | 1 |
| 21 Feb 2015 | Accuscore | 35 | 34 | 35 | 57 | 15 | 14 | 8 | 1 | 1 |
| 23 Jan 2015 | Accuscore | 35 | 33 | 36 | 56 | 15 | 15 | 8 | 1 | 1 |
| 2 Jun–2 Dec 2014 | Taloustutkimus | 42 | 31 | 37 | 50 | 17 | 12 | 8 | 2 | 1 |
