= 2017 Green League leadership election =

Political party leadership election in Finland

The Finnish Green League leadership election, 2017 was held on in 2017 to elect the new chair of the Green League. All members of the party who have paid their subscription were allowed to vote in the election via mail, and although the voting process was not legally binding, the party had agreed to respect its results in the official selection process in party conference on 17 June 2017. Record number of 5,778 votes, 5,769 of them valid, were given by the members. Instant run-off voting was used in the advisory election.

There were six candidates running for party chair; Touko Aalto, Mika Flöjt, Emma Kari, Krista Mikkonen, Maria Ohisalo and Olli-Poika Parviainen. The incumbent party chair Ville Niinistö, who had led the party since 2011, was not running for party leadership anymore, after having served the maximum number of years permitted by the rules of the party.

The election was won by Touko Aalto. He received 2,046 first-preference votes, 35.5% of all first-preferences. In the decisive fifth round, he received 3,489 votes (62.3% of all votes) against Emma Kari's 2,111 votes.
