= Könkkölä =

Könkkölä is a surname. Notable people with the surname include:

- Kalle Könkkölä (1950–2018), Finnish politician and human rights activist
- Marius Könkkölä (born 2003), Finnish footballer
