= Sauri =

Sauri may be:

- Sauri language, a Papuan language
- Magali Sauri, French ice skater
- Pekka Sauri, Finnish politician
- Casa Sauri, hotel in Puerto Rico
