= Pekka Haavisto =

Finnish politician (born 1958)

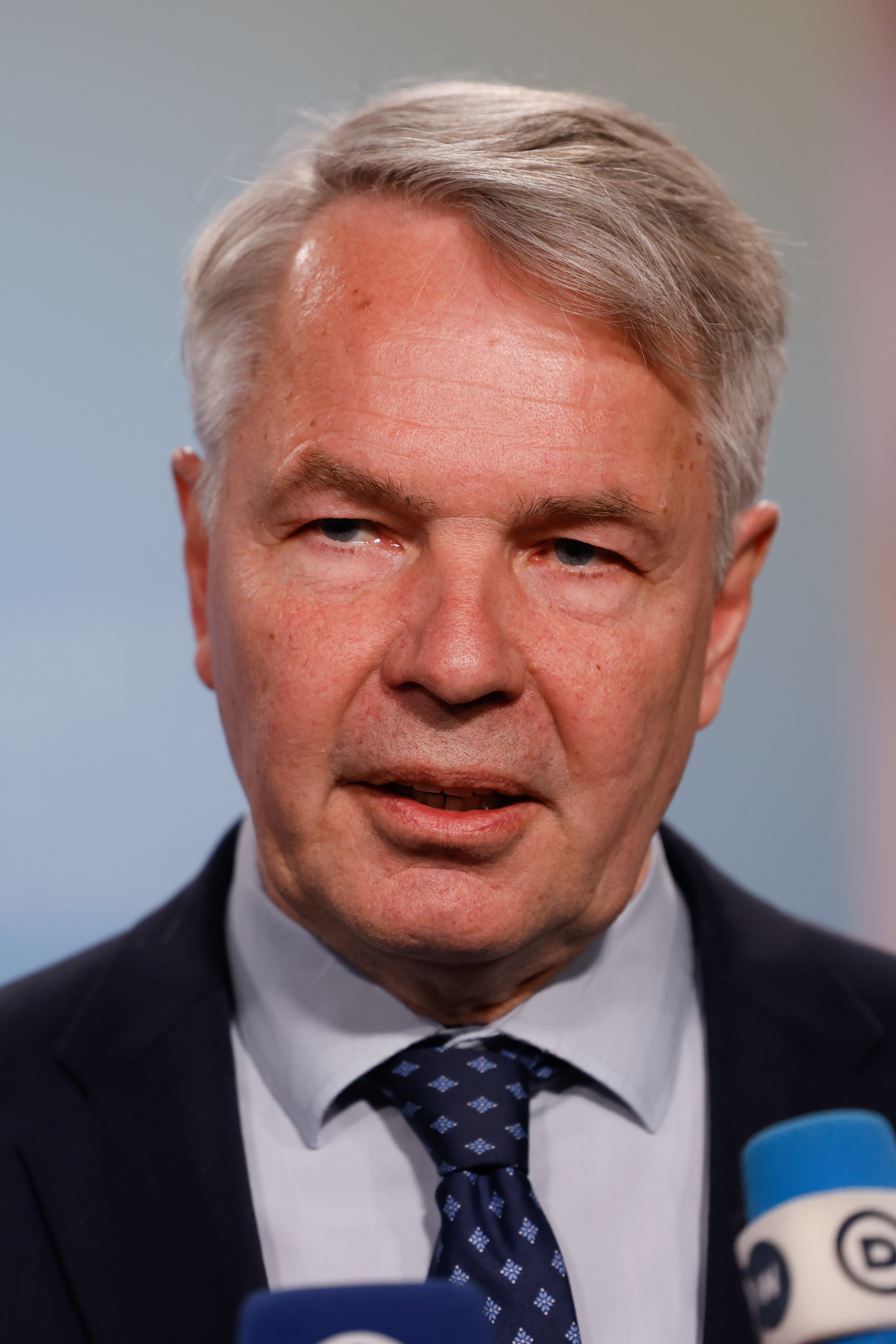
- Haavisto in 2023

Member of the Finnish Parliament for Helsinki
- Incumbent
- Assumed office 21 March 2007
- In office 21 March 1987 – 23 March 1995

Minister for Foreign Affairs
- In office 6 June 2019 – 20 June 2023
- Prime Minister: Antti Rinne; Sanna Marin
- Preceded by: Timo Soini
- Succeeded by: Elina Valtonen

Minister of the Environment
- In office 13 April 1995 – 15 April 1999
- Prime Minister: Paavo Lipponen
- Preceded by: Sirpa Pietikäinen
- Succeeded by: Satu Hassi

Minister for International Development
- In office 11 October 2013 – 26 September 2014
- Prime Minister: Jyrki Katainen; Alexander Stubb
- Preceded by: Heidi Hautala
- Succeeded by: Sirpa Paatero

Personal details
- Born: Pekka Olavi Haavisto; 23 March 1958 (age 68) Helsinki, Uusimaa, Finland
- Party: Green League
- Domestic partner: Nexar Antonio Flores (2002–present)
- Occupation: Politician
- Website: www.pekkahaavisto.com

Pekka Olavi Haavisto (Finnish: [ˈpekːɑ ˈolɑʋi ˈhɑːʋisto]; born 23 March 1958) is a Finnish politician of the Green League who served as the Minister for Foreign Affairs from 2019 to 2023.

Haavisto returned to the Finnish Parliament in the Finnish parliamentary election of March 2007 after an absence of 12 years and was re-elected in 2011, 2015, and 2019. Between April 1995 and April 1999 he was the Minister of Environment in the Lipponen I Cabinet. In October 2013 he was appointed as the Minister for International Development after Heidi Hautala resigned from the job. He has also been a member of the Helsinki City Council.

Haavisto finished second in the Finnish presidential elections in 2012, 2018 and 2024; twice to Sauli Niinistö and finally to Alexander Stubb. Haavisto became the first openly gay candidate to run for the presidency of Finland.

== Political career ==
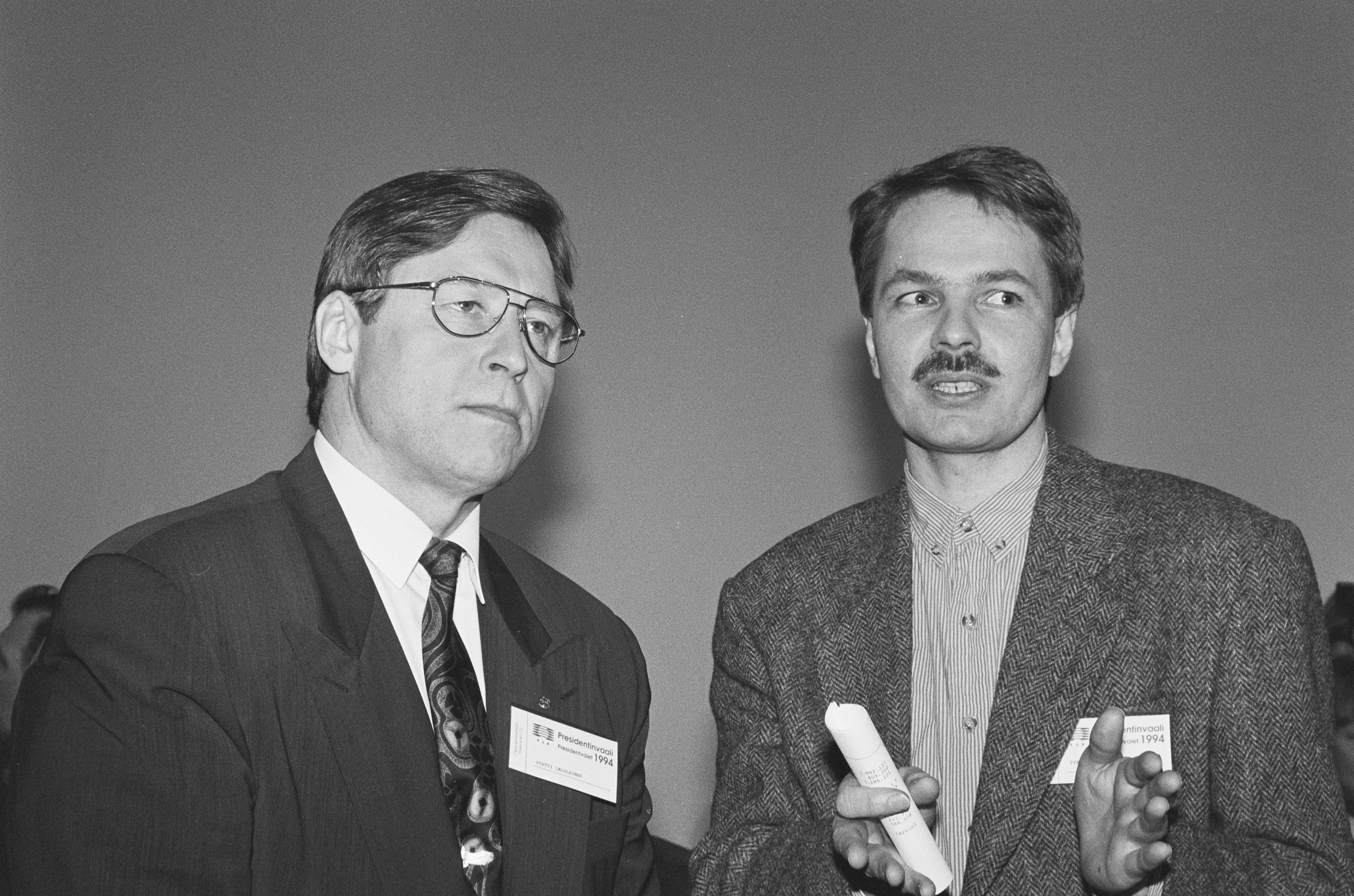
Pertti Salolainen and Pekka Haavisto in 1994

Haavisto was a member of the Parliament of Finland from 1987 to 1995. He was the chairperson of the Green League from 1993 to 1995. He served as the Minister of the Environment in Paavo Lipponen's first cabinet between 1995 and 1999. He was the first European cabinet minister representing a Green party.

From 1999 to 2005, Haavisto worked for the United Nations in various tasks. He led the United Nations Environment Programme (UNEP) research groups in Kosovo, Afghanistan, Iraq, Liberia, Palestine and Sudan. He also coordinated the UN investigation in the effects of depleted uranium in Kosovo, Montenegro, Serbia and Bosnia and Herzegovina. Haavisto also represented the UNEP in the investigations in the Baia Mare mining accident in Romania. In 2005 he was appointed as the special representative of the European Union in Sudan where he participated in the Darfur peace talks.

In 2007 and 2011 Haavisto was re-elected to Parliament by the electoral district of Helsinki.

=== Presidential election 2012 ===
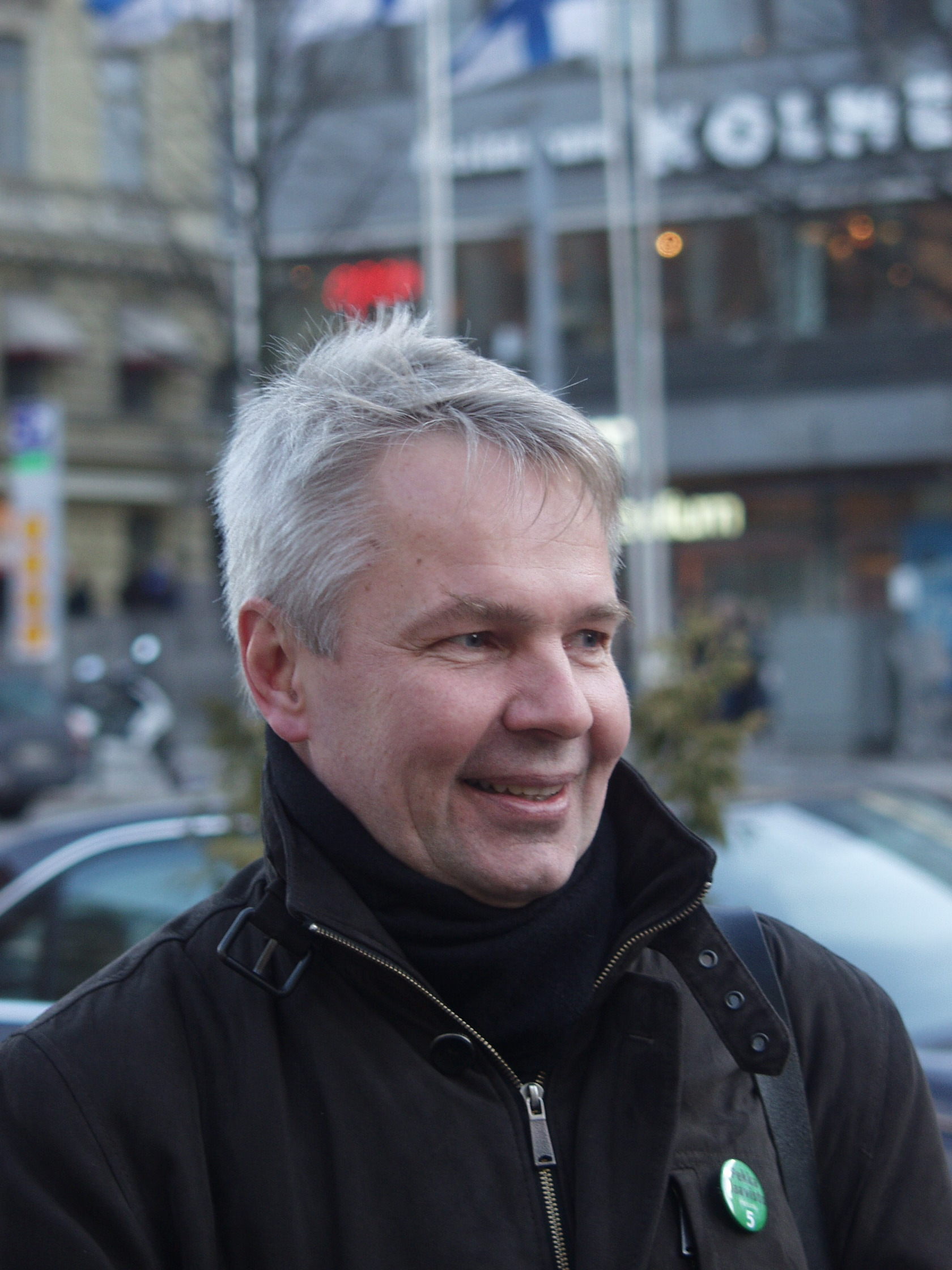
Pekka Haavisto in 2011.

In 2011, Haavisto was nominated as the Green League candidate for the Finnish presidential election of 2012. In the first round of the election on 22 January 2012, he finished second with 18.8 percent of the votes. In the run-off on 5 February, he garnered more than one million votes (37.4 percent), coming second to National Coalition Party candidate, former Finance Minister Sauli Niinistö. Haavisto was the first openly gay candidate and the first male candidate to have served in civil service instead of the military service to make it to the second round of a presidential election in Finland.

=== Presidential election 2018 ===
In February 2017, Haavisto announced that he would reprise his candidacy in the 2018 presidential election. The decision came after Haavisto had been approached multiple times by the Green League. In the election, Haavisto placed second with 12.4% of the votes, while President Niinistö went on to secure his second term with a majority of votes.

=== Return as chairman ===
In October 2018, the chairman of the Green League Touko Aalto announced that he was resigning from his post, citing depression and fatigue. The decision prompted an immediate leadership election, with the goal to elect a temporary chairman to lead the party into the 2019 parliamentary elections and until the next party convention. As many members of the party called for more prominent and experienced politicians to take part in the election, Haavisto announced his candidacy. On 4 November 2018, he defeated MP Outi Alanko-Kahiluoto in the leadership election and became temporary chairman.

In June 2019, Haavisto stepped down as the chairman of the party. He was succeeded by Maria Ohisalo.

=== Minister of Foreign Affairs, 2019–2023 ===
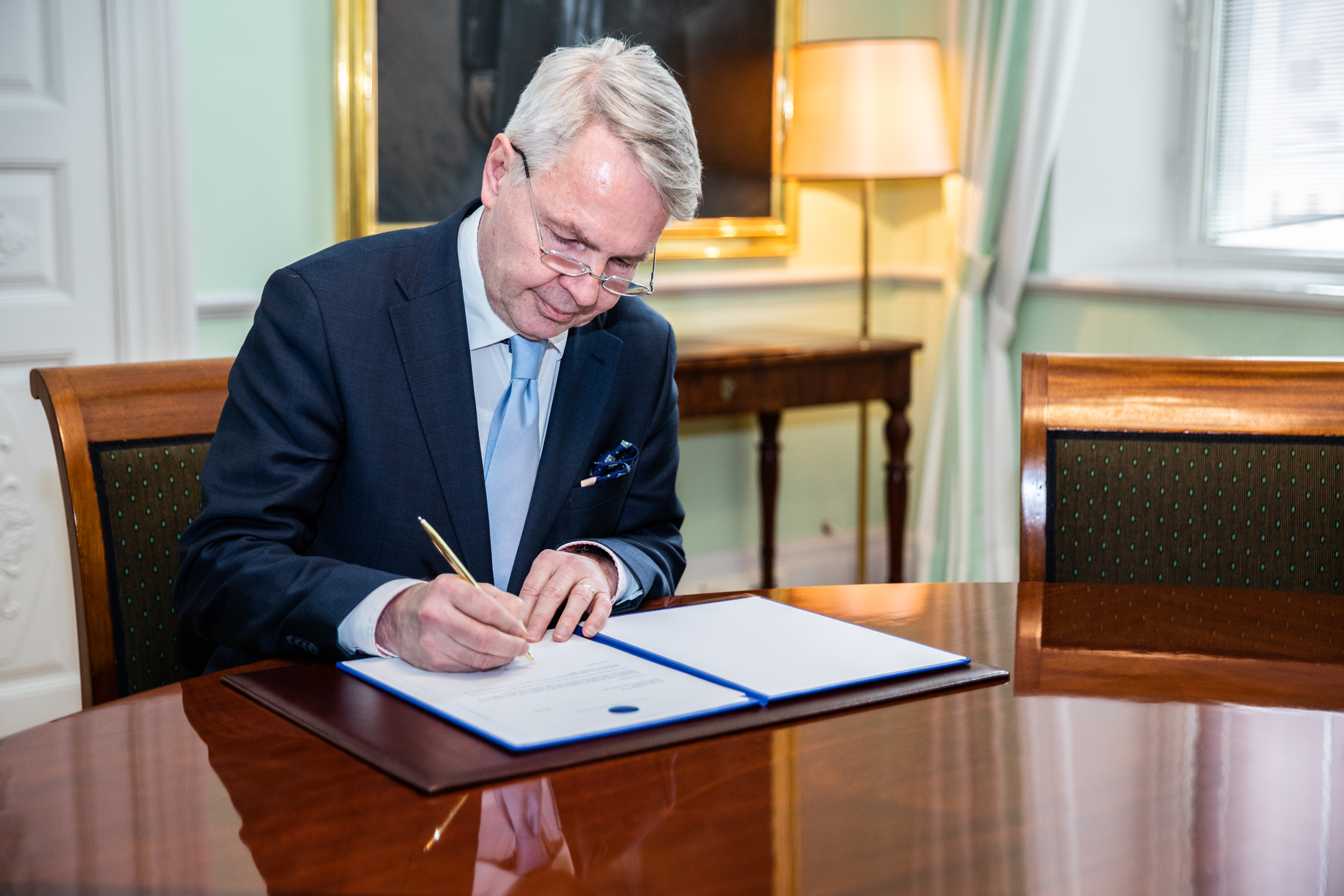
Haavisto signing Finland's application for NATO membership in 2022

Following their best ever result in the 2019 national elections and after becoming part of the incoming governing coalition under the leadership of Prime Minister Antti Rinne, the Green League named Haavisto as the next foreign minister. In this capacity, he chaired the meetings of the Foreign Affairs Council during Finland's rotating presidency of the Council of the European Union in 2019.

In 2019, Haavisto called for the EU to intensify efforts on improving relations with Russia in the face of international conflict, transatlantic tensions and Brexit.

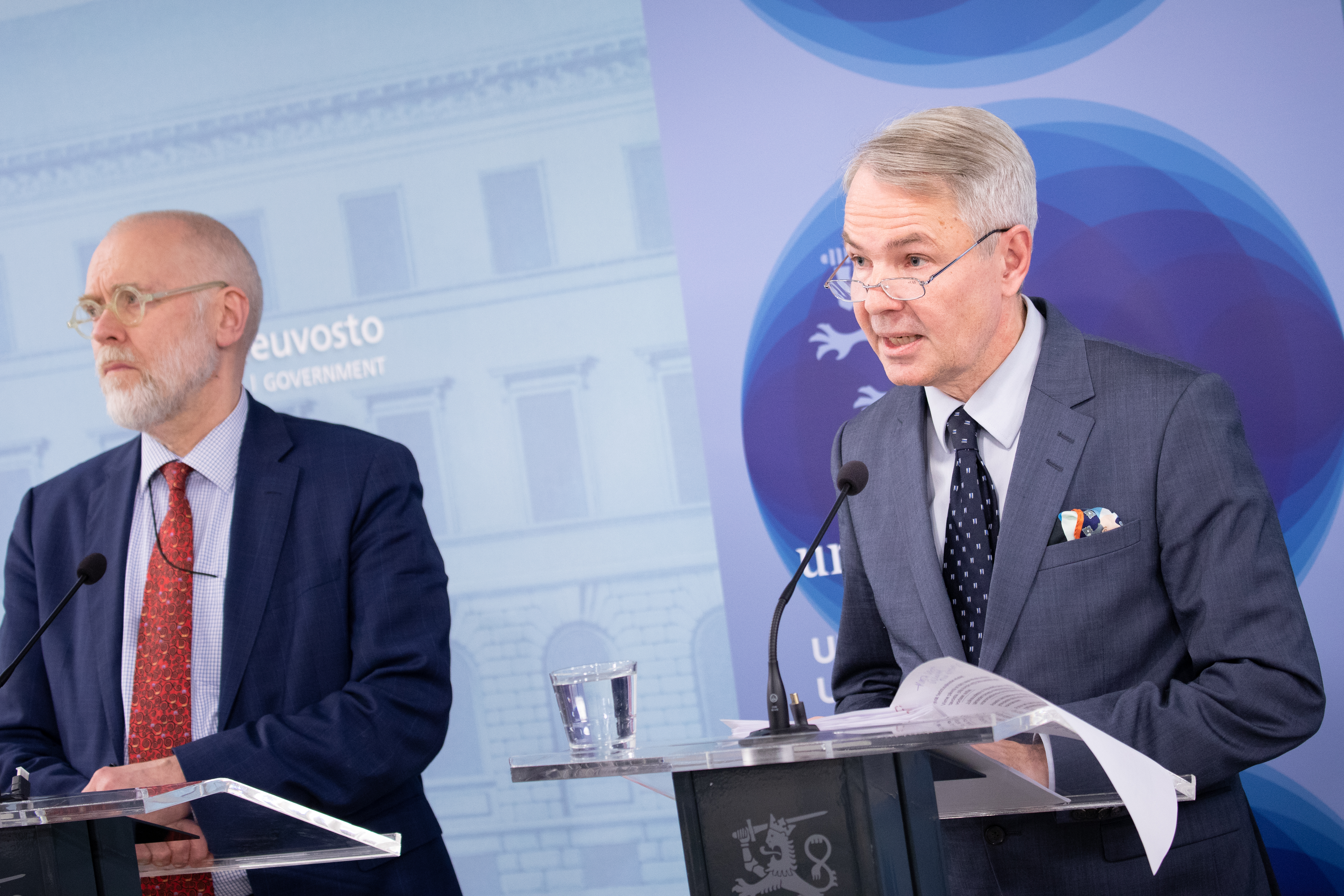
Haavisto's press conference about the situation in al-Hawl in 2019.

In December 2020, the Parliament's Constitutional Law Committee found that Haavisto, who had pushed for Finnish children from the al-Hawl refugee camp in northern Syria to be brought to Finland quickly in late 2019, had broken Finnish law by trying to replace a foreign ministry official who refused to act after a difference of opinion over the exact repatriation proceedings. The events were leaked to the press causing a political crisis. Haavisto quickly reverted his decision to demote the official and offered him the same position as earlier. The Committee declared it had not found reason to bring criminal charges against the foreign minister, due to the minister's higher than usual prosecution threshold required by the constitution, but specified that Haavisto had operated in contravention to the Administration Law and the Foreign Relations Act. Two Green League MPs published a dissenting opinion and advocated for a softer verdict, causing controversy in the Committee. In Parliament, Haavisto received the Parliament's support in a 101-68 interpellation vote. Haavisto's decision to return the refugees received the Parliament's support on a 110-79 interpellation vote.

In February and March 2021, Haavisto was under criminal investigation for an alleged Highway Code violation in December 2020. The complaint originated from a video recorded by a reporter for the gossip magazine Seiska, which included commentary that Haavisto had not stopped for two pedestrian crossings. The prosecutor who reviewed the video evidence decided not to press charges, citing construction work that had disabled the first crossing and created an unclear situation for the other.

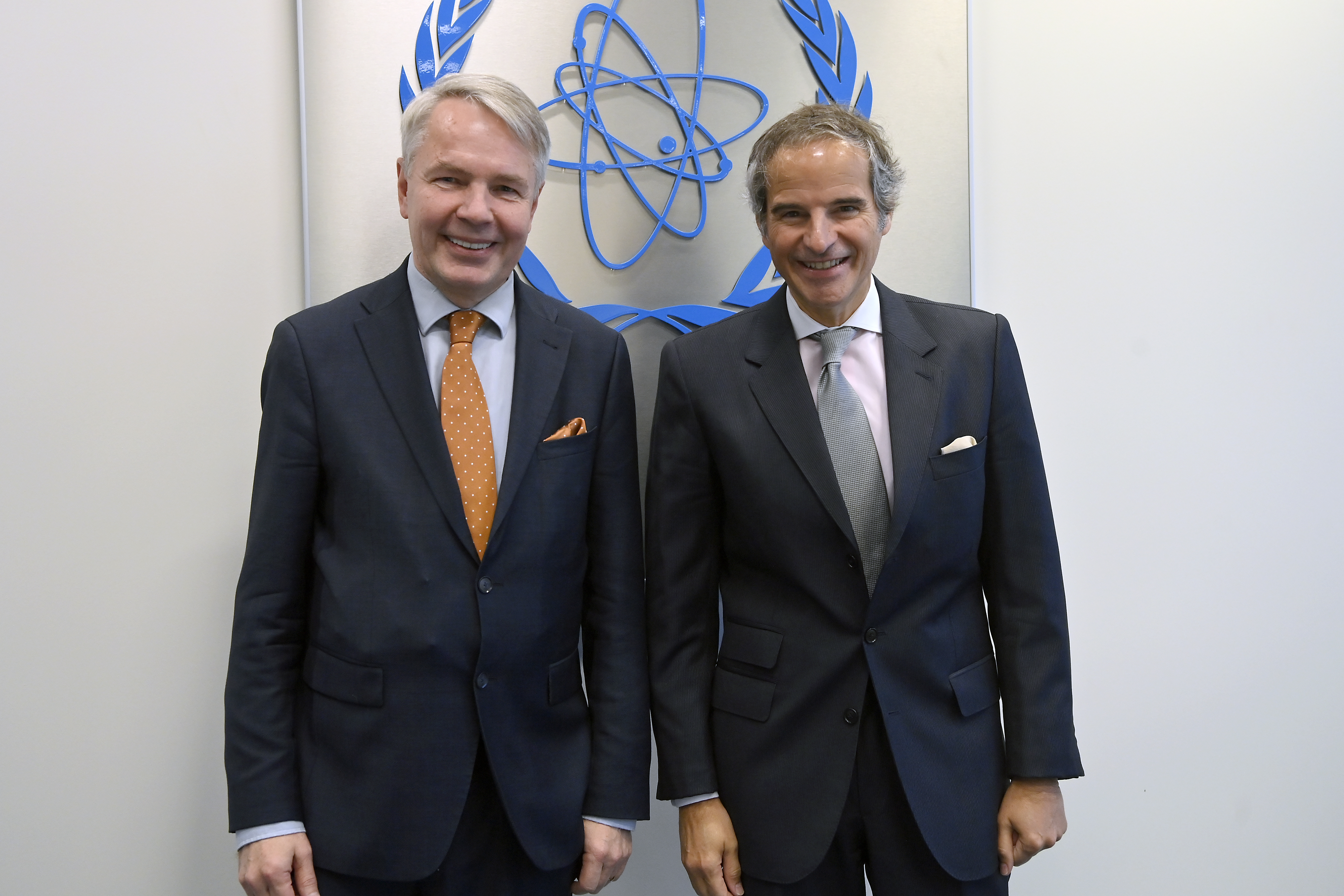
Haavisto meets with IAEA Director General, Rafael Mariano Grossi during his official visit at the Agency headquarters in Vienna, Austria. 1 November 2022.

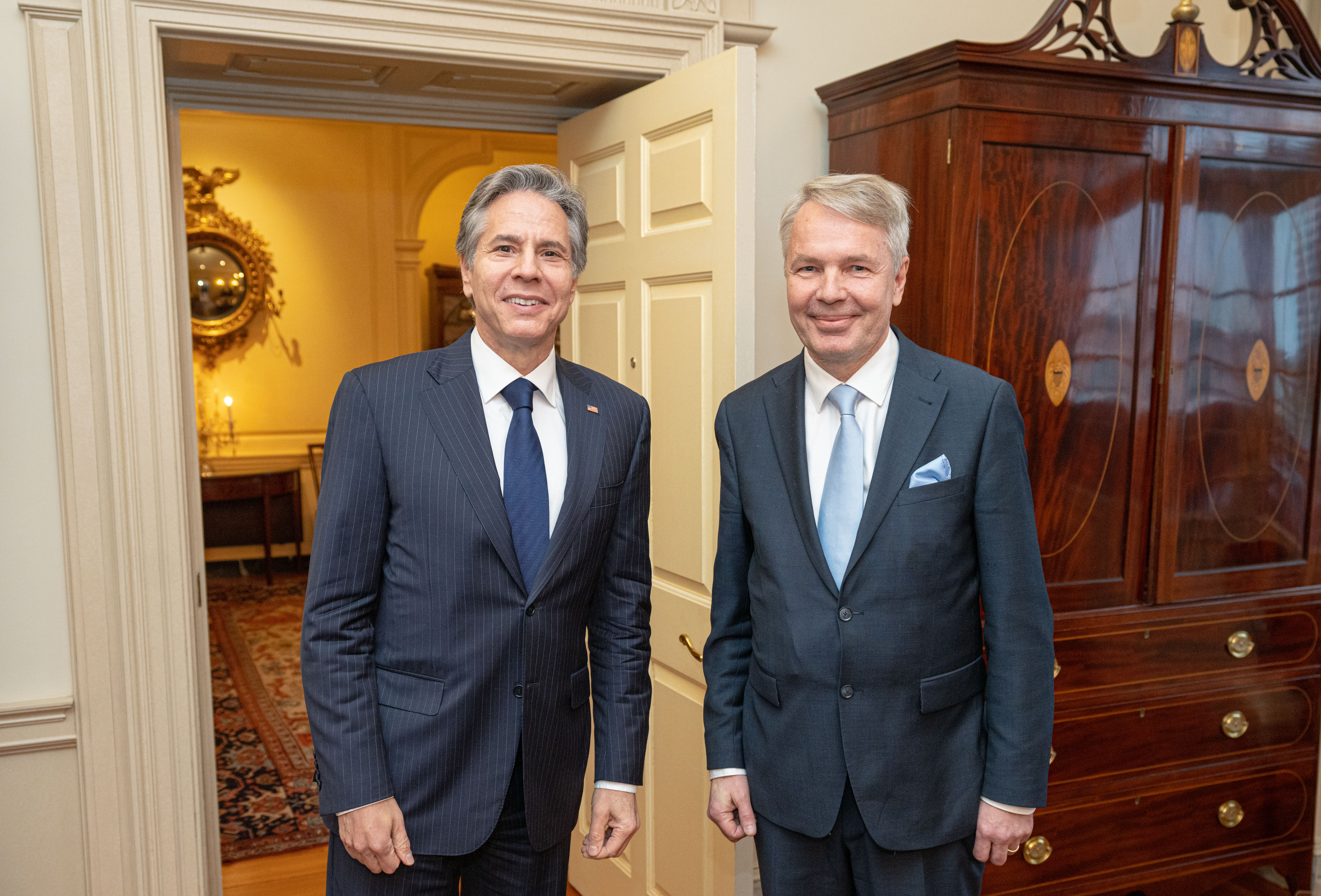
Haavisto meets with U.S. Secretary of State Antony J. Blinken in Washington in May 2022.

Haavisto was appointed EU's special envoy to Ethiopia during the Tigray War. In February 2021, Haavisto stated that violence and suffering in Ethiopia was "out of control" and could cause a large refugee crisis. In June 2021, he briefed the European Parliament on the conflict. Haavisto warned of a possible ethnic cleansing of Tigrayans, stating that Ethiopia's leaders in closed-door talks said "they are going to wipe out the Tigrayans for 100 years." Ethiopia's foreign ministry dismissed Haavisto's comments as "ludicrous" and a "hallucination of sorts or a lapse in memory of some kind." Haavisto stated that Ethiopian criticism will have no effect on his work as envoy and referred to an upcoming UN human rights report on the situation.

On 17 May 2022, Haavisto signed Finland's application to join NATO. Haavisto visited Kyiv in November, stating that "Finland strongly condemns Russia's illegal invasion of Ukraine. We will continue our firm support to Ukraine as long as necessary."

=== 2024 presidential election ===
In June 2023, Haavisto announced that he would reprise his candidacy in the 2024 Finnish presidential election as an independent candidate. Haavisto finished second in the first round of voting held on 18 January 2024 and later lost to Alexander Stubb in the runoff on 11 February 2024. Stubb officially took office as the 13th President of Finland on 1 March 2024.

== Other activities ==
- International Crisis Group (ICG), Member of the Board of Trustees (since 2024)
- European Council on Foreign Relations (ECFR), Member (since 2021)
- European Institute of Peace (EIP), Chairman of the Board of Governors (since 2016)
- United Nations Personal Envoy for Sudan (since 2026)

== Personal life ==
After completing the matriculation examination of the upper secondary school, Haavisto began studying social sciences at the University of Helsinki. He dropped the studies after a year and did not complete the degree. As a young man he chose civil service over military service in the Defence Forces.

Haavisto is openly gay. Although his homosexuality was an open secret during the 1990s, his sexual orientation wasn't public until 2002, when he entered in a registered partnership with Nexar Antonio Flores, an Ecuadorian man born in Esmeraldas in 1978. They have been together since 1997 when they met in a Bogotá night club.

According to the ranking of the Finnish Ulkopolitiikka magazine in 2009, Haavisto was internationally the 5th most influential person in Finland.

== Honors ==
=== National ===
- Finland: Order of the Lion of Finland (2022)
- Finland: Military merit medal (2008)

=== Foreign ===
- Sweden: Commander Grand Cross of the Royal Order of the Polar Star (22 October 2024) (KmstkNO)
- France: Legion of Honour (2019)

Party political offices
Preceded by Pekka Sauri	Chairperson of the Green League; 1993–1995	Succeeded by Tuija Brax
Preceded by Touko Aalto	Chairperson of the Green League; 2018–2019	Succeeded by Maria Ohisalo
Political offices
Preceded by Sirpa Pietikäinen	Minister of Environment; 1995–1999	Succeeded by Satu Hassi
Preceded by Heidi Hautala	Minister for International Development; 2013–2014	Succeeded by Sirpa Paatero
Preceded by Timo Soini	Minister for Foreign Affairs; 2019–2023	Succeeded by Elina Valtonen
