= Ville Niinistö =

Finnish politician (born 1976)

Ville Niinistö MEP
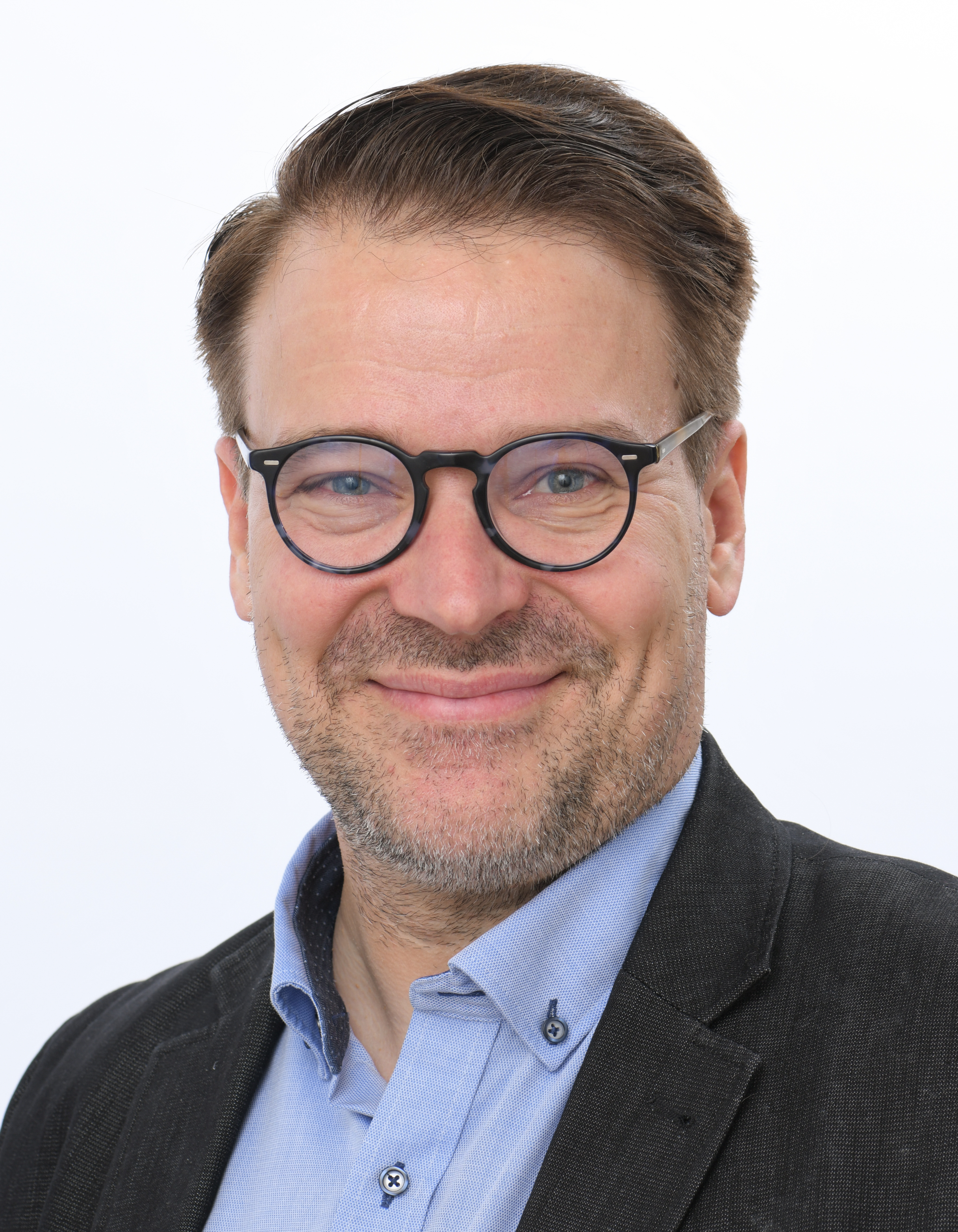

Member of the European Parliament
- Incumbent
- Assumed office 5 July 2019
- Constituency: Finland

Minister of the Environment
- In office 22 June 2011 – 25 September 2014
- Prime Minister: Jyrki Katainen; Alexander Stubb
- Preceded by: Paula Lehtomäki
- Succeeded by: Sanni Grahn-Laasonen

Chair of the Green League
- In office 11 June 2011 – 17 June 2017
- Preceded by: Anni Sinnemäki
- Succeeded by: Touko Aalto

Member of the Finnish Parliament for Finland Proper
- In office 18 March 2007 – 16 April 2019

Personal details
- Born: 30 July 1976 (age 50) Turku, Finland
- Party: Green League
- Spouse: Maria Wetterstrand (m. 2004; div. 2012)
- Children: 2
- Relatives: Sauli Niinistö (uncle)
- Education: University of Turku

Ville Niinistö presenting himself in a video produced by Heinrich Böll Foundation/Green European Foundation.

Ville Matti Niinistö (born 30 July 1976) is a Finnish politician who has been serving as a Member of the European Parliament since 2019. He is a former member of parliament, former chairperson of the Green League and served as Minister of the Environment from 2011 to 2014, and a member of the city council of Turku.

== Early life and education ==
Niinistö has a master's degree in political science from the University of Turku. Before being elected to the parliament in 2007 he worked as a doctorate student in political history (Finnish foreign policy) at the University of Turku in Finland.

== Political career ==
=== Career in national politics ===
Niinistö first became a member of the Finnish Parliament in the 2007 elections.

From 2011 until 2014, Niinistö served as Minister of the Environment in the governments of successive Prime Ministers Jyrki Katainen and Alexander Stubb. During his time in office, Niinistö reignited a long-running debate about Finland's relationship with Russia in 2014 by saying his own government's decision to approve a Russian-built nuclear reactor invoked "a sense of Finlandization". Shortly after, he quit in protest at the project, accusing the government of favouring Russia. As a consequence, his Green League equally quit the five-party Finnish coalition government.

By 2017 Green League party congress, Niinistö had served two full terms as the chairman and stepped down according to the rules of the party. He was followed by MP Touko Aalto, who won the leadership election on 17 June 2017. In October 2018, Niinistö announced that he would not seek another term in the parliament in the 2019 election.

=== Member of the European Parliament, 2019–present ===
Since becoming a Member of the European Parliament, Niinistö has been serving on the European Parliament Committee on Industry, Research and Energy, where he is his parliamentary group's coordinator.

In addition to his committee assignments, Niinistö is part of the European Parliament Intergroup on Climate Change, Biodiversity and Sustainable Development, the European Parliament Intergroup on Seas, Rivers, Islands and Coastal Areas, the European Parliament Intergroup on Small and Medium-Sized Enterprises (SMEs), and of the European Parliament Intergroup on the Welfare and Conservation of Animals.

== Other activities ==
- Finnvera, Member of the supervisory board (since 2016)

== Personal life ==
Niinistö is the nephew of Sauli Niinistö, the former president of Finland. He was married to Maria Wetterstrand, former spokesperson of the Swedish Green Party; they separated in 2012. They have a son, Elias, who was born in 2004, and a daughter, Linnea, born 2007. In his free time Niinistö enjoys reading, role-playing games, and football.

In 2013 it was revealed that he drove his Swedish wife's car with Swedish number plates in Finland on minor occasions, while she was absent. The Finnish customs imposed a €4800 tax on him. The Finnish tax code does not allow Finnish citizens to drive a foreign car in Finland without it being thus considered an imported car and therefore under Finnish car tax.
