= Nexar Antonio Flores =

Ecuadorian-Finnish artist (born 1978)

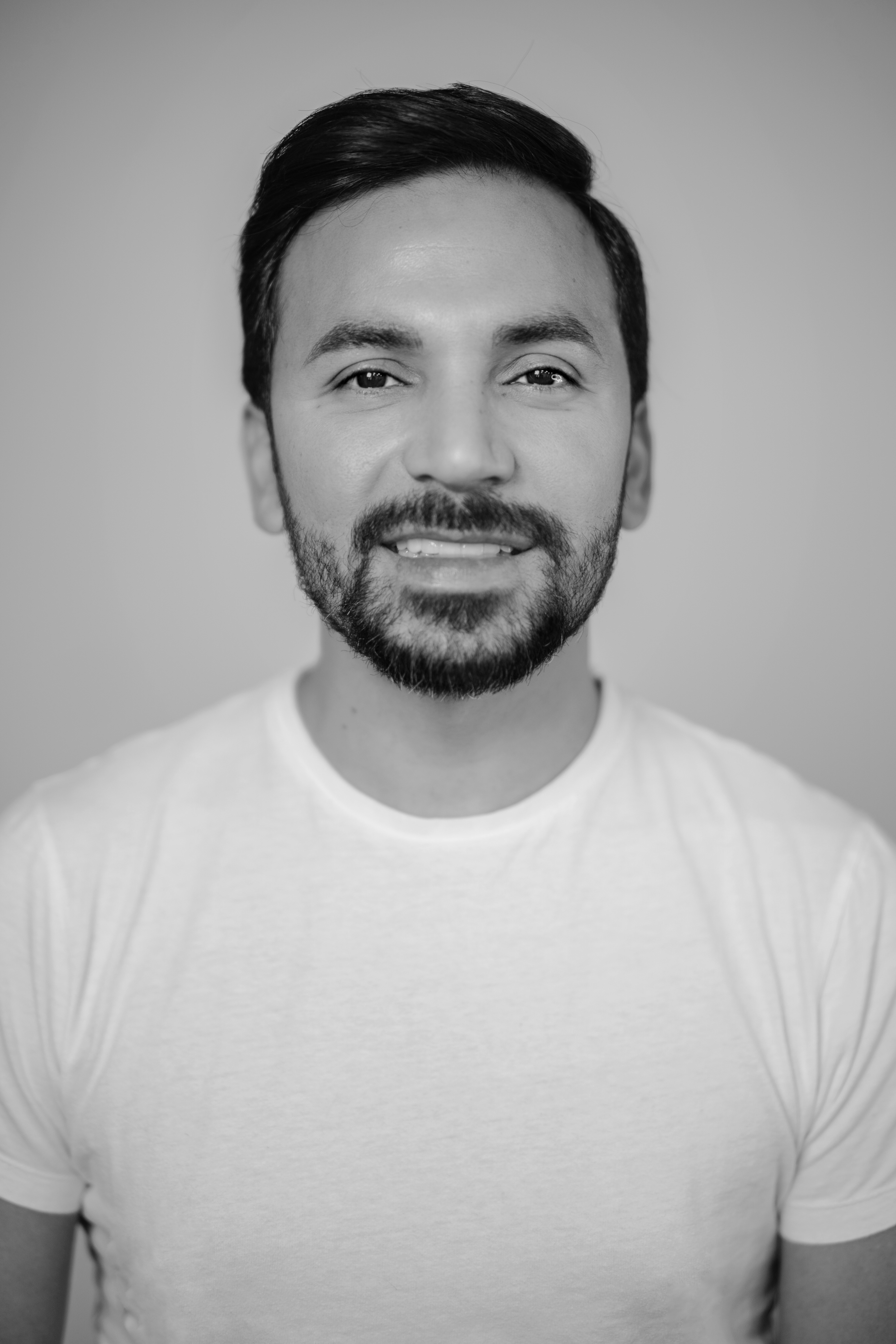
- Born: 28 July 1978 (age 47); Esmeraldas, Esmeraldas Province, Ecuador
- Citizenship: Ecuador; Finland
- Occupations: Fashion stylist; make-up artist
- Partner: Pekka Haavisto (2002–present)

Nexar Antonio Flores (born 28 July 1978) is an Ecuadorian and Finnish fashion stylist and make-up artist who is the partner of Finnish presidential candidate and former Minister for Foreign Affairs Pekka Haavisto.

== Early life and youth ==
Flores was born on 28 July 1978, in Esmeraldas, in the province of the same name of Ecuador. At the age of 16, Flores came out as gay to his parents, moving with an aunt in Quito soon after that due to lack of understanding and acceptance by his parents over his sexual orientation. In the capital, Flores began studying to become a certified public accountant. However, he never worked in that field, instead working at a bar in Quito while pursuing other studies in hairdressing and beauty. In 1996, Flores moved away from Ecuador, first living in Panama before settling in Bogotá, Colombia, where he worked as an assistant beautician at a salon.

== Relationship with Haavisto ==
Flores and Haavisto met in 1997 at a nightclub in Bogotá, during a vacation trip made by Haavisto, who was then the Finnish Minister of the Environment. Shortly afterwards, Flores returned to Ecuador, where he improved ties with his family. In December 1997, Haavisto visited Flores in Ecuador and spent the holidays with him and his family.

In May 1998, Flores travelled to Finland and decided to remain there to live with Haavisto. In Europe, he learned Finnish (previously communicating with Haavisto in English), and acquired certifications as a flight attendant from Ryanair UK in London, and one in graphic design from Omnia Media in Helsinki. Additionally, Flores worked as a stylist and makeup artist in a series production for Paramount+ in Germany and others for Netflix.

The couple registered their union in 2002, later living in Switzerland and Belgium while Haavisto held positions representing the Finnish government. They returned to Finland in 2011 when Haavisto sought the presidency in the 2012 presidential election. Haavisto was the first openly gay politician to run for president in Finland. He ran again for that position in 2018 and in the 2024 election, coming in second place in all three occasions.

In an interview with an Ecuadorian newspaper, Flores said in January 2024, that being a gay man may have been an issue in the 2012 election, but he added that Finnish society developed a more open mind in the years that followed. Conversely, a study by the University of Helsinki found in the lead-up to the 2024 election that a third of voters in Finland would not vote for a gay politician.

== Personal life ==
Flores has stated that he suffered from homophobia in Ecuador, where he said that people thought that being gay meant that "(you) want to be a woman." He also stated that in Ecuadorian society people used to think that being gay made it impossible to be a soldier, a doctor, a businessman or a politician. Flores compared homophobia in his native Ecuador with Finland, saying that a gay man is at risk of being assaulted in Ecuador while same-sex couples walk hand in hand in Finland.

He has appeared in reality shows like the Finnish version of I'm a Celebrity...Get Me Out of Here!, whose filming took place in Argentina, and reached the second place in Tanssii tähtien kanssa. In 2023, Flores was a contestant in Farmi Suomi, the Finnish version of The Farm. He has also taken part in UNICEF missions to Mauritania and other countries in North Africa.

In February 2024, Flores spoke about the Ecuadorian security crisis, expressing concern at the growing violence. He also said that while President Daniel Noboa had a vision for the country, he (Flores) thought that Noboa would not last long in power, adding that changes in Ecuador could take generations.

Flores speaks several languages and owns a beauty salon in Helsinki.
