= Elina Valtonen =

Finnish politician (born 1981)

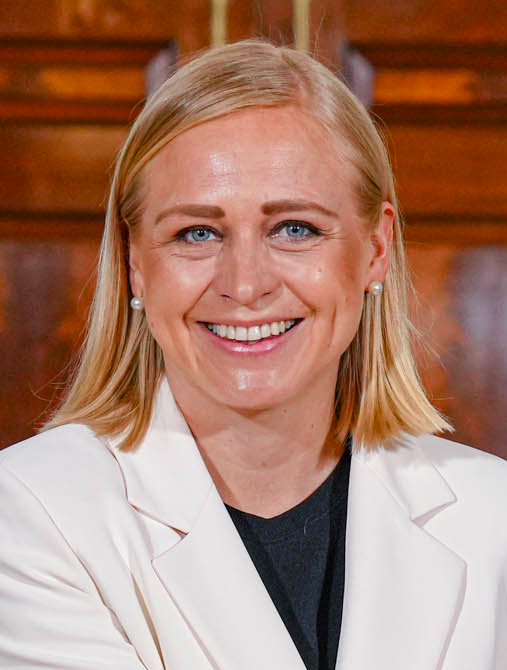
- Valtonen in 2026

Minister for Foreign Affairs
- Incumbent
- Assumed office 20 June 2023
- Prime Minister: Petteri Orpo
- Preceded by: Pekka Haavisto

Member of the Finnish Parliament for Helsinki
- Incumbent
- Assumed office 4 July 2014

Personal details
- Born: Elina Maria Valtonen; 23 October 1981 (age 44) Helsinki, Finland
- Party: National Coalition Party
- Education: Helsinki University of Technology; Helsinki School of Economics
- Website: elinavaltonen.fi

Elina Maria Valtonen (formerly Lepomäki; born 23 October 1981) is a Finnish politician who has served as Minister for Foreign Affairs under Prime Minister Petteri Orpo since 2023. A member of the National Coalition Party (NCP), she has represented the constituency of Uusimaa in the Parliament of Finland since 2014. In the 2021 municipal election she won the second-highest number of votes in Helsinki and was elected a member of its city council.

== Education ==
Valtonen holds a master's degree in both technology and financial economics from the Helsinki University of Technology and Helsinki School of Economics. She is a shareholder in several technology start-ups; she chaired the board of the pro free-market think tank Libera from 2015 to 2021.

== Career ==
Prior to entering politics in 2014, Valtonen spent 10 years in investment banking, as a director at Royal Bank of Scotland and as a senior analyst at Nordea. She has developed a model for transforming the welfare state into a digital sharing economy, called the Life Account. In 2018, she participated in a Bilderberg Meeting in Turin.

In April 2016, Valtonen announced her candidacy for the leadership of the National Coalition Party. In the first round of the leadership election on 11 June 2016 she received 15% of the vote and thus failed to be elected. In September 2020, Valtonen was elected as a new deputy chair of the National Coalition Party.

In the parliamentary elections of 2023, Valtonen raised the largest election campaign budget, 179,000 euros. Her biggest funders were Chaim Poju Zabludowicz and Björn Wahlroos.

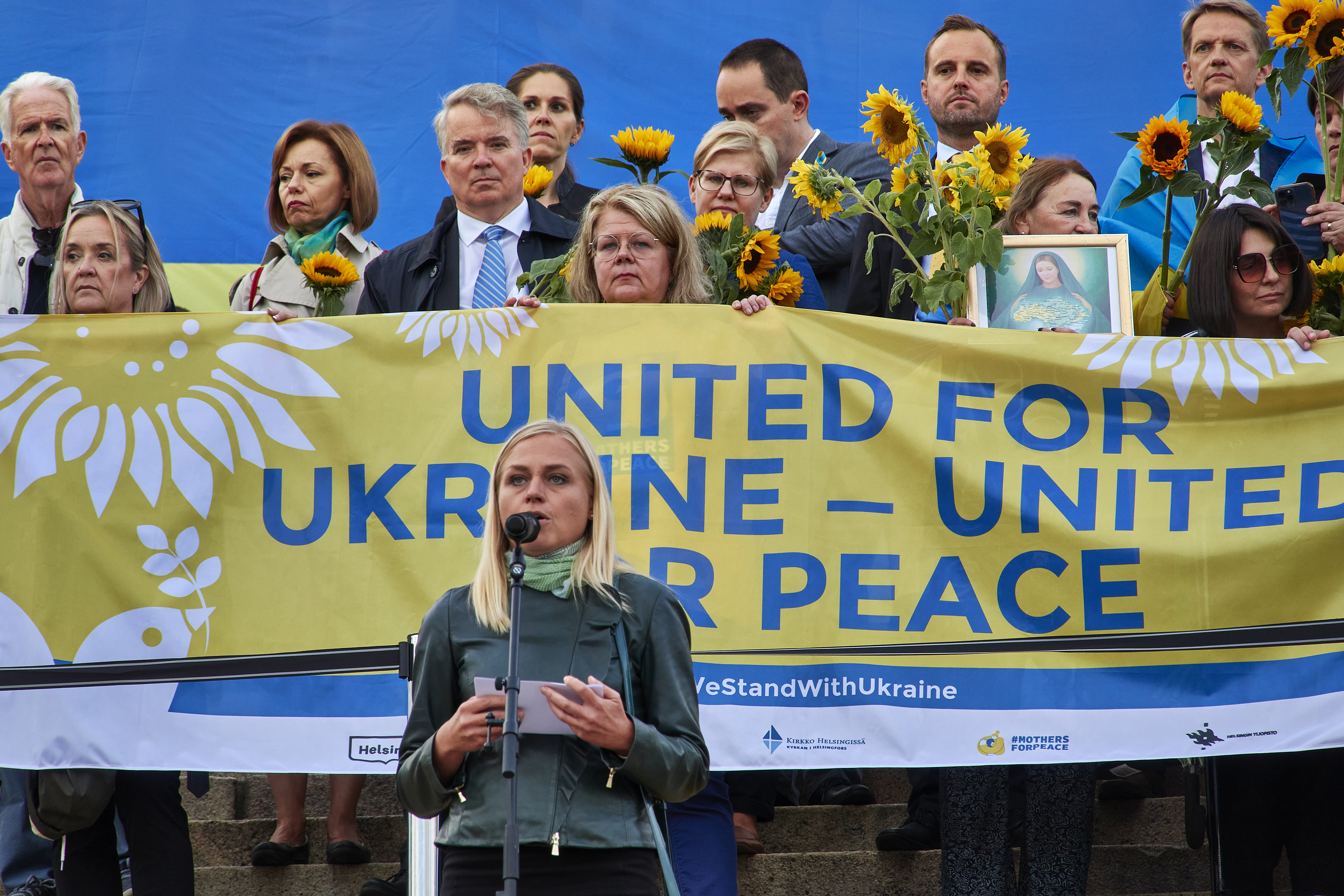
Elina Valtonen on 24 August 2023

=== Minister of Foreign Affairs ===
In June 2023, she was appointed Minister for Foreign Affairs in the Orpo Cabinet.

In January 2024, 79 Finnish diplomats signed a letter to Valtonen, criticising the official response to the Israeli attacks on Gaza.

Valtonen and her Nordic counterparts signed a joint letter in late October 2024 condemning Israel's planned bill that would seek to ban the UNRWA from operating in the country and in effect the Palestinian areas. Furthermore, they urged the Knesset to reconsider passing the bill.

Elina Valtonen and Johann Wadephul in Helsinki (July 2026

In October 2025, Valtonen visited Tbilisi, Georgia, in her capacity as OSCE Chairperson-in-Office, amid mass protests outside the Georgian Parliament. She briefly met with demonstrators. The visit occurred in the context of ongoing unrest over the controversial foreign agents law and growing criticism of the Georgian Dream government's perceived antidemocratic and anti-Western policies, which raised international concern about Georgia's democratic trajectory, as well as allegations of electoral fraud in the 2024 Georgian parliamentary election, drawing international attention to concerns about democratic backsliding in Georgia.

== Writing ==
Valtonen has co-authored several reports on economics and the society such as "The Future of the Euro – The alternatives for Finland" (2014) and "The Life Account – A Social Security Reform" (2013).

== Other activities ==
- European Council on Foreign Relations (ECFR), Member of the Council (since 2023)

== Personal life ==
In September 2020, Valtonen filed for divorce from Jukka Lepomäki; in April 2021 she announced that she had changed her surname back to her maiden name.

== Honours ==
- Sweden: Royal Order of the Polar Star, Commander Grand Cross (23 April 2024)

Political offices
Preceded by Pekka Haavisto	Minister for Foreign Affairs; 2023–present	Incumbent
