= Heidi Hautala =

Finnish politician (born 1955)

Heidi Hautala MEP
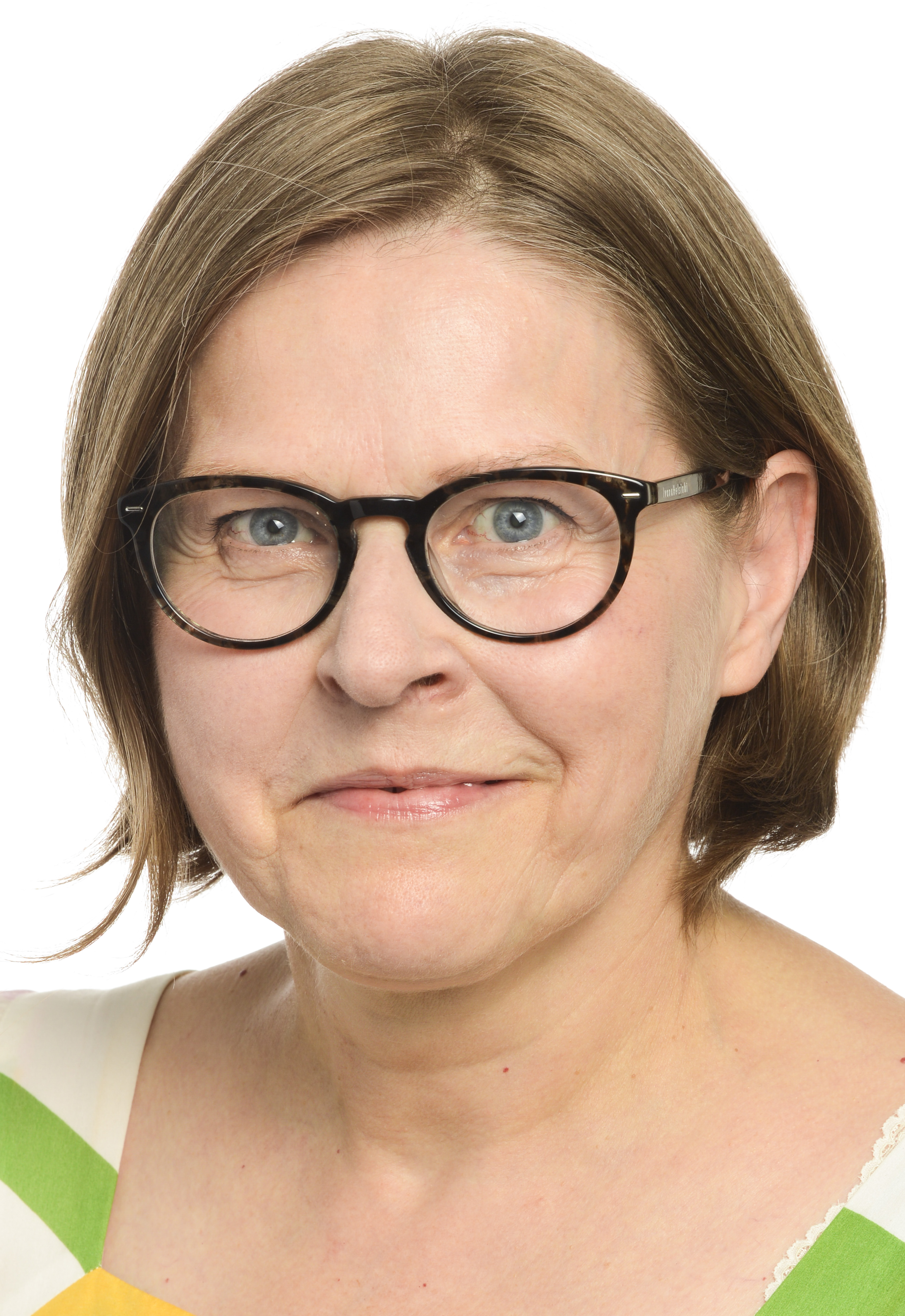

Vice-President of the European Parliament
- In office 26 October 2017 – 16 July 2024
- President: Antonio Tajani; David Sassoli; Roberta Metsola

Member of the European Parliament
- Incumbent
- Assumed office 1 July 2014
- In office 14 July 2009 – 21 June 2011
- In office 1 January 1995 – 25 March 2003
- Constituency: Finland

Minister for International Development
- In office 22 June 2011 – 16 October 2013
- Prime Minister: Jyrki Katainen
- Preceded by: Paavo Väyrynen
- Succeeded by: Pekka Haavisto

Chair of the Finnish Green Party
- In office 1 March 1987 – 19 May 1991
- Preceded by: Kalle Könkkölä
- Succeeded by: Pekka Sauri

Member of the Finnish Parliament
- In office 16 March 2003 – 14 July 2009
- In office 5 March 1991 – 19 March 1995
- Constituency: Central Finland

Personal details
- Born: Heidi Anneli Hautala; 14 November 1955 (age 70) Oulu, Finland
- Party: Green League
- Other political affiliations: European Green Party
- Education: University of Helsinki
- Website: www.heidihautala.fi

Heidi Anneli Hautala (born 14 November 1955) is a Finnish politician and Member of the European Parliament (MEP) from Finland. She is a member of the Green League, part of the European Green Party.

She is currently a Member of the European Parliament for the fifth time. Previously she held the post from 1995 to 2003 and 2009 to 2011 when she chaired the Subcommittee on Human Rights 2009–2011. She has been the Vice-President of the European Parliament since 2017. She served as minister for international development and ownership steering issues in Jyrki Katainen's cabinet.

== Early life and education ==
Hautala was born in the northern Finnish city of Oulu in 1955. Her father was a high-ranking war-hero who later went on to become one of the region’s most powerful bankers.

Hautala holds a master's degree in horticulture. She speaks Finnish, English, Swedish, German, French and some Russian.

== Political career ==
=== Beginnings in national politics ===
Hautala was the leader of the Finnish Green Party from 1987 to 1991, and a presidential candidate in 2000 and 2006. She was a member of the national parliament from 1991 to 1995.

=== Member of the European Parliament, 1995–2003 ===
After Finland joined the European Union (EU) in 1995, Hautala was elected to the European Parliament. Between 1998 and 1999, she served as chair of the Committee on Women's Rights. She later led the Greens–European Free Alliance in the European Parliament from 1999 to 2002, alongside Paul Lannoye.

After less than two years on the assembly’s environment committee, Hautala was chosen to steer a proposal for a Fuel Quality Directive through the parliament.

As a member of the Committee on Legal Affairs between 1999 and 2003, Hautala participated in the negotiations to increase openness in the EU. In 2001, she successfully took the Council of the European Union to the European Court of Justice over access to a document on arms export rules. The Court ruled that the ministers should have considered publishing at least part of the document. The so-called "Hautala case" set a precedent in European law for access to documents. In 2002, Hautala led a campaign for the European Parliament to set up a public register of members’ assistants.

Between 2002 and 2003, Hautala was the president of the European Parliament Intergroup on Public Health.

=== Member of the Finnish Parliament, 2003–2009 ===
Hautala returned to the national Parliament in the elections of 2003.

Hautala was the chair of the Administrative Council of Neste Oil, a Finnish oil refining and marketing company producing mainly transportation fuels and other refined petroleum products. She works closely with EU affairs as a member of the Grand Committee. In addition, she chaired the Green parliamentary group and was the Chair of the Legal Affairs Committee in the Finnish Parliament. Also she was a member of the Parliament's Speaker's Council, as well as the chair of the National Equality Commission (TANE). She advocates environmental responsibility, openness in politics, and global justice.

In the first round of the 2006 election, Hautala finished fourth of the eight candidates with a vote share of 3.5% (105,248 votes).

=== Member of the European Parliament, 2009–2011 ===
In 2009, Hautala was re-elected to the European Parliament, where she served as chair of the Subcommittee on Human Rights and as member of the Committee on Foreign Affairs.

Hautal became well known for promoting transparency in the EU after winning the case against the Council on access to documents on arm trade, known as the Hautala Case T-14/98.

Hautala is a signatory of the 2010 Declaration on Crimes of Communism, a patron of its preceding conference, and was a member of the Reconciliation of European Histories Group as an MEP.

=== Minister of international development and state ownership steering 2011-2013 ===
Hautala was nominated the minister of international development and state ownership to Jyrki Katainen's government in 2011. In 2013 it emerged Hautala had hired cleaning lady and repair work without taking care of the employer payments. She agreed to pay the contributions and apologised for her actions, and resigned from the ministerial working group against the informal economy. Later, she promoted the service Palkkaus.fi service that was inspired by her: the service intends to make it easy for private employers to handle all the employer payments through a website.

==== Arctic Shipping case and resignation ====
Hautala resigned from her development and state ownership steering minister position in October 2013 amidst of allegations of abuse of power.

In a protest against Arctic ice drilling a year earlier, members of Greenpeace boarded without authorization on the multipurpose icebreakers Fennica and Nordica operated by the state-owned company Arctia Shipping under contract to the Royal Dutch Shell. Hautala's office had recommended that the company withdraw its criminal complaint against Greenpeace, and threatened to fire the management in case that they disobliged. When Iltalehti first broke the story, Hautala initially offered a different account of the events, denying that her office had pressured the company. She eventually stated that she could no longer work as a minister, because she had been inaccurate and remembered things incorrectly.

Hautala had also made comments in an open support of Greenpeace activists detained in Russia under piracy charges, criticising Russia of "disproportionately tough measures" against the members of the NGO.

In February 2014 the Chancellor of Justice Jaakko Jonkka stated, that neither Hautala nor the head of the state ownership steering unit of the government acted unlawfully when preventing the filing criminal charges a case against Greenpeace.

Later, former activists of the Finnish Seafarers' Union admitted they started the Arctia Shipping case with the help of Finns Party's Matti Putkonen. Hautala considered having been a target of the union activists because of lay offs due to sectoral reforms.

=== Member of the European Parliament, 2014–2019 ===
Hautala returned to the European Parliament following the 2014 elections. She has since been a member of the Committee on Development, Committee on Legal Affairs and Committee on International Trade as well as substitute member of the Committee on Budgets. She also served as vice-chair of the Greens–European Free Alliance, under the leadership of Rebecca Harms and Philippe Lamberts from 1 July 2014 to 14 November 2017. She was also a co-president of the Euronest Parliamentary Assembly, and the chair of European Parliament delegation to the Euronest from 4 September 2014 to 1 February 2017.

In addition to her committee assignment, Hautala served as co-chair of the Working group on Reproductive Health, HIV/AIDS, and Development in the European Parliament. She was also a member of the European Parliament Intergroup on Western Sahara, several international delegations and the European Parliament Intergroup on the Welfare and Conservation of Animals.

In 2016, Hautala was appointed by Erik Solheim, the Chairman of the Development Assistance Committee, to serve on the High Level Panel on the Future of the Development Assistance Committee under the leadership of Mary Robinson. On development, Hautala has proposed that sexual and reproductive health and rights and a gender action plan be core elements of the development policy in light of the Sustainable Development Goals. She has opposed using development policy mechanisms as a basis for military intervention under EU umbrella, denouncing a weak legal basis for the move.

On trade, Hautala has proposed to curb the global trade of illegal timber to prevent deforestation, asked the European Commission to introduce legislation to establish human rights due diligence requirements for multinational EU companies to respect human rights and prevent incidents such as Rana Plaza. and presented a shadow EU Action Plan on Responsible Business Conduct, to increase business accountability and responsibility, avoid that globalisation produce a race to the bottom and stop supply chains which deliver profits from human rights violations, such as an estimated $150 billion a year from forced labour.

In October 2017, Hautala was appointed as the Vice President of the European Parliament until summer 2019, becoming the third Finn to hold the position. In this capacity, she was also a member of the Democracy Support and Election Coordination Group (DEG), which oversees the Parliament’s election observation missions.

Results of her parliamentary activity include several reports of which she was in charge as rapporteur and which have been approved by a very large majority, including:

- a regulation to establish a fund of over 300 M€, within the 2021-27 budget of the European Union, for "the further development of a European area of justice based on the rule of law, including independence and impartiality of the judiciary, on mutual recognition, mutual trust and judicial cooperation, thereby also strengthening democracy rule of law and fundamental rights";
- a non-legislative resolution recommending that any trade agreement with Vietnam avoid encouraging environmental damage such as deforestation (connected to the export of illegal timber from illegal logging);
- a resolution on the management of forests in developing countries containing a number of recommendations on Forest and land governance, Responsible supply chains and financing, Policy coherence for development, Forest criminality, trade issues;
- the 2014 report on monitoring the application of EU law;
- several reports on cases of requested parliamentary immunity and on the accession of states to the Child Abduction Convention.

In March 2019, Hautala won another lawsuit for transparency, case T-329/17 Hautala and others v EFSA: the General Court annulled «the decision of the European Food Safety Authority (EFSA) of 14 March 2017, in so far as EFSA refused access to the parts "material, experimental conditions and methods" and "results and discussion" of 12 carcinogenicity studies on the active substance glyphosate». The lawsuit was filed in 2017, following a long controversy around the glyphosate re-authorisation process and the so-called Monsanto Papers, after which EFSA refused to release a number of documents including 75 unpublished studies because «disclosure of the other parts of the studies could undermine the commercial interests of their owners». The court established «that the protection of those commercial interests may not be invoked to preclude the disclosure of that information» by EU institutions, as the public interest prevails.

For the then upcoming Finnish semester, Hautala in 2019 proposed the promotion of health and well-being as an overall objective under which to work on matters such as global warming, air pollution and energy efficiency of buildings.

Hautala was ranked as one of the 15 most influential MEPs in the 2014-19 legislature by VoteWatch, as measured by the positions held, the number of reports and opinions and the votes won, weighed by perceived importance and normalized by average influence of their country.

=== Member of the European Parliament, 2019–present ===
Hautala got re-elected to the European Parliament. She serves this term as a Member of the Committee on International Trade (INTA) and of the Subcommittee on Human Rights (DROI). She also serve as a Substitute Member of the Committee on Legal Affairs (JURI). In addition, Hautala participates as a Member in the Delegation for relations with the countries of Southeast Asia and the Association of Southeast Asian Nations ASEAN (Brunei, Cambodia, Indonesia, Laos, Malesia, Myanmar, the Philippines, Singapore, Thailand and Vietnam), as a Substitute Member in the Delegation to the EU-Russia Parliamentary Cooperation Committee and as a Substitute Member in the Delegation to the EU-Armenia Parliamentary Partnership Committee, the EU-Azerbaijan Parliamentary Cooperation Committee and the EU-Georgia Parliamentary Association Committee.

Hautala was elected as Vice-President of the European Parliament in October 2017 and re-elected to this office in 2019.

The main themes in her work are human rights, openness, global justice and environmentally responsible legislation. She is also the founder of the European Parliament working group for Responsible Business Conduct, which involves a number of stakeholders and MEPs from different political groups.

In September 2022, Hautala was the recipient of the People's Choice: Outstanding Achievement in Public Service Award at The Parliament Magazine's annual MEP Awards

== Other activities ==
- EastWest Institute, Member of the Parliamentarians Network for Conflict Prevention
- European Council on Foreign Relations (ECFR), member
- Green European Foundation, President (since 2008)
- Crisis Management Initiative, member of the Executive Bureau (2006-2010)
- Finnish League for Human Rights, member of the Board (2007-2009)
- Finnish-Russian Civic Forum, chair (2006-2010)
- Service Centre for Development Cooperation (KEPA), chair (2002-2007)
- German "Förderverein" of the Caucasian Chamber Orchestra, advisory board

== Political positions ==
So when Heidi Hautala, a Green MP and former environment minister [sic], blasted declining democratic standards in Vladimir Putin's Russia, the sense of shock in Helsinki was palpable. .... The nervous reaction to Ms Hautala's remarks has provided a faint echo of the self-censorship of the Soviet era, when the term "Finlandisation" was coined to describe countries that quietly tailored their politics and policies to suit Moscow. "The mindset has not totally changed. It's still there in the back of our heads," said Lasse Lehtinen, a Finnish MEP. Ms Hautala's worries were well founded, he added. "There is a general, growing feeling of unease about Russia for the past two years or so. We don't say it, but we think it."

— The Guardian article: "Putin's shadow falls over Finland", 2011

In 2008, Hautala published the book "Venäjä-teesit. Vakaus vai vapaus" about Russia. In 2015, news media reported that she was included in a Russian blacklist of prominent people from the European Union who are not allowed to enter the country.

== Personal life ==
Hautala has a son from her relationship with a Finnish artist Jan Olof Mallander. Hautala has also been in a relationship with a German researcher Carlo Jordan, and was considered close to Russian film director Andrei Nekrasov, a vocal critic of Putin before beginning to produce Russian-friendly propaganda.

Hautala introduced Nekrasov to Bill Browder, whose interview excerpts were used in Nekrasov's film The Magnitsky Act – Behind the Scenes. Despite the pro-Kremlin narrative of the film, Hautala promoted it. She subsequently voted for a motion calling on a restricted use of the EU Magnitsky act to direct participation, ruling out sanctions for any one in directly responsible.

== Books written ==
- Hautala, Heidi (2008). Venäjä-teesit - Vakaus vai vapaus? (in Finnish). Tammi. ISBN 978-9-51-314245-2.

Party political offices
| Preceded by Kalle Könkkölä | Chairperson of the Green League; 1987–1991 | Succeeded by Pekka Sauri |
