= Sofia Virta =

Finnish politician

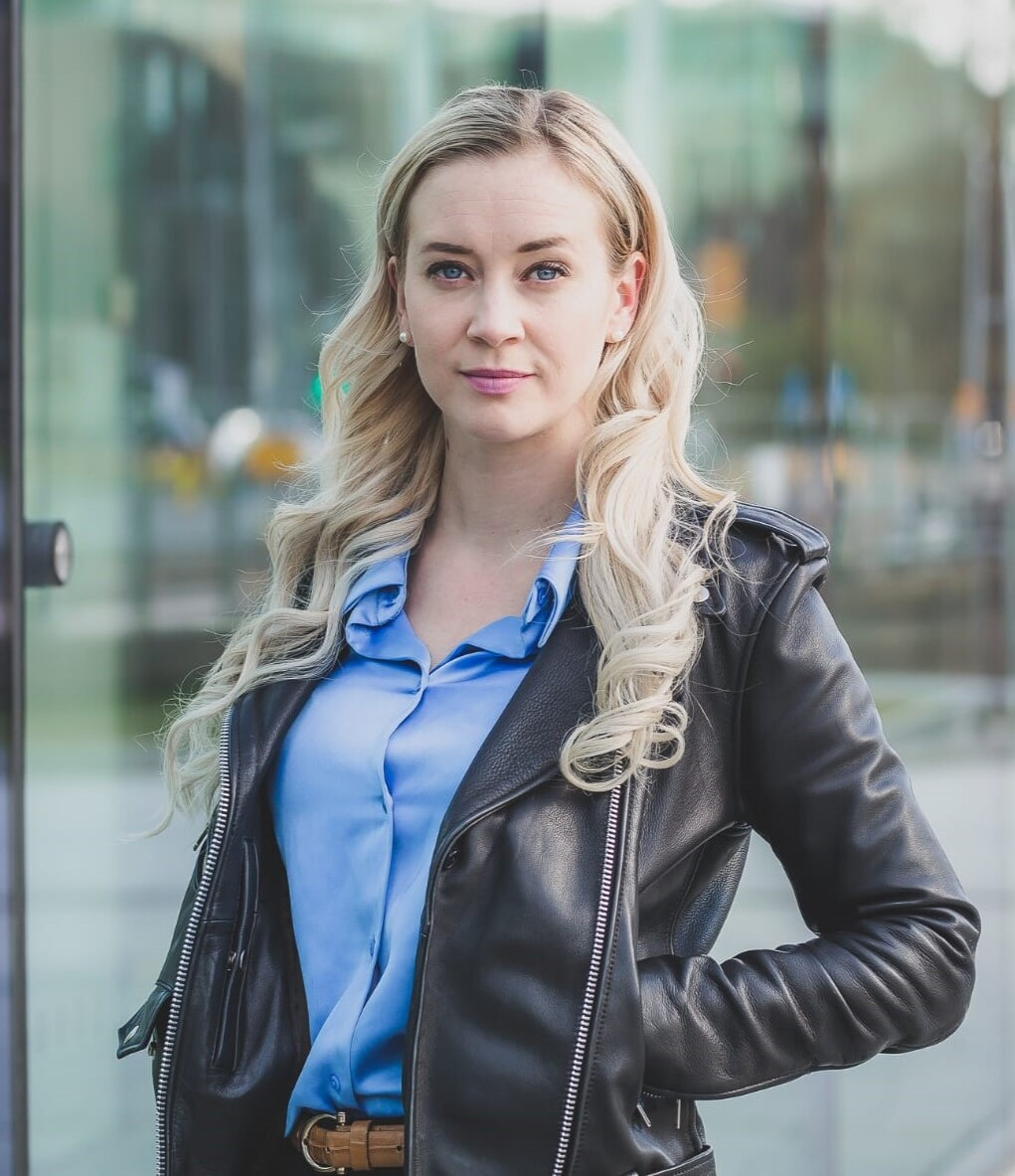
- Sofia Virta in 2023

Chair of the Green League
- Incumbent
- Assumed office 10 June 2023
- Preceded by: Maria Ohisalo

Member of Parliament for Varsinais-Suomi
- Incumbent
- Assumed office 17 April 2019

Personal details
- Born: 21 June 1990 (age 35) Kaarina, Southwest Finland, Finland
- Party: Green League
- Profession: Master of Education, entrepreneur
- Website: https://www.eduskunta.fi/EN/kansanedustajat/Pages/1411.aspx

Sofia Marjanna Virta (born 21 June 1990) is a Finnish politician of the Green League currently serving as a member of the Parliament of Finland for the Varsinais-Suomi constituency since 2019, as well as the current chairman of the Green League since 10 June 2023.

== Political career ==
In the spring 2017 municipal elections, Virta became a member of the Kaarina city council; she was re-elected in the 2021 elections.

In the spring 2019 parliamentary elections, she became a member of the Parliament of Finland.

In the beginning of 2022, she was elected to the Varsinais-Suomi regional council, where she serves as the chairman of the Green League.

== Present memberships in committees ==
Social Affairs and Health Committee (member) 18.06.2019–

Committee for the Future (deputy member) 18.06.2019–

Employment and Equality Committee (member) 18.06.2019–

Parliamentary Trustees of the Social Insurance Institution of Finland (deputy member) 18.06.2019–

Political offices
Preceded by Maria Ohisalo	Chairman of the Green League; 2023–present	Incumbent
