= Jan Olof Mallander =

Jan Olof (JO) Mallander, born 25 December 1944 in Helsinki, is a Finnish visual artist, musician, performance poet and art critic. His parents were economist Per Olof Mallander and bookkeeper Meri Lindblad. He married politician Heidi Hautala in 1979.

== Biography ==
He became a student in 1965 and studied in 1967 at the Fria konstskolan and 1967–1968 at the Helsinki University Drawing Room, and exhibited for the first time in 1969. He is one of the pioneers of conceptual art in Finland and has become known to the public primarily through his exhibitions and his critical work. Among his sculptures are his early so-called paper sculptures and large brick installations, which he has made both indoors and outdoors since 1983, and the endless WANG drawing, which was exhibited at the Moderna Museet in Stockholm in 1980. His early classic works include the EP album Extended Play from 1968, which consists of a repeated series of the word "Kekkonen" read out by a vote teller.

Mallander has worked as an art critic in various newspapers and magazines since 1968 and published poetry collections. Between 1968 and 1980 he worked as an art critic for Hufvudstadsbladet and between 1971 and 1972 for Dagens Nyheter. He also worked as a freelance journalist for Yle 1967–1969, Uusi Suomi and Taide. Mallander founded the cultural magazines Iiris (1968–1971), Vargen (1971–1972), Uuden Ajan Aura (1976–1982) and Suomi (1982–1988).

As a musician, he debuted in the underground band Sperm. Mallander co-founded Skördemännen and the following year the gallery Cheap Thrills, for which he was curator from 1971 to 1977. There, he arranged exhibitions with Skördemännen and introduced a number of new representatives of the young avant-garde, not least Olli Lyytikäinen. Mallander was also deeply involved in Buddhism for a long time. He has worked as curator for many exhibitions both in Finland and internationally.

A retrospective exhibition of his art was held in Tampere in 1986. Jan-Olof Mallander is represented at, among others, Skissernas museum.

== Selected bibliography ==
- Out. Borgä 1969, 1969
- The paperive ice cream. Kansio, 1973
- Kama Lettra, 1975
- The reading drama, 1975
- 1131 right, 1976
- "Poem Collection 1976", 1976
- Poem collection 1978. (In the beginning a decision was made), 1978

=== Translations ===
- Translation into Swedish of texts in Kimmo Kaivanto, 1982
