= Krista Mikkonen =

Finnish politician (born 1972)

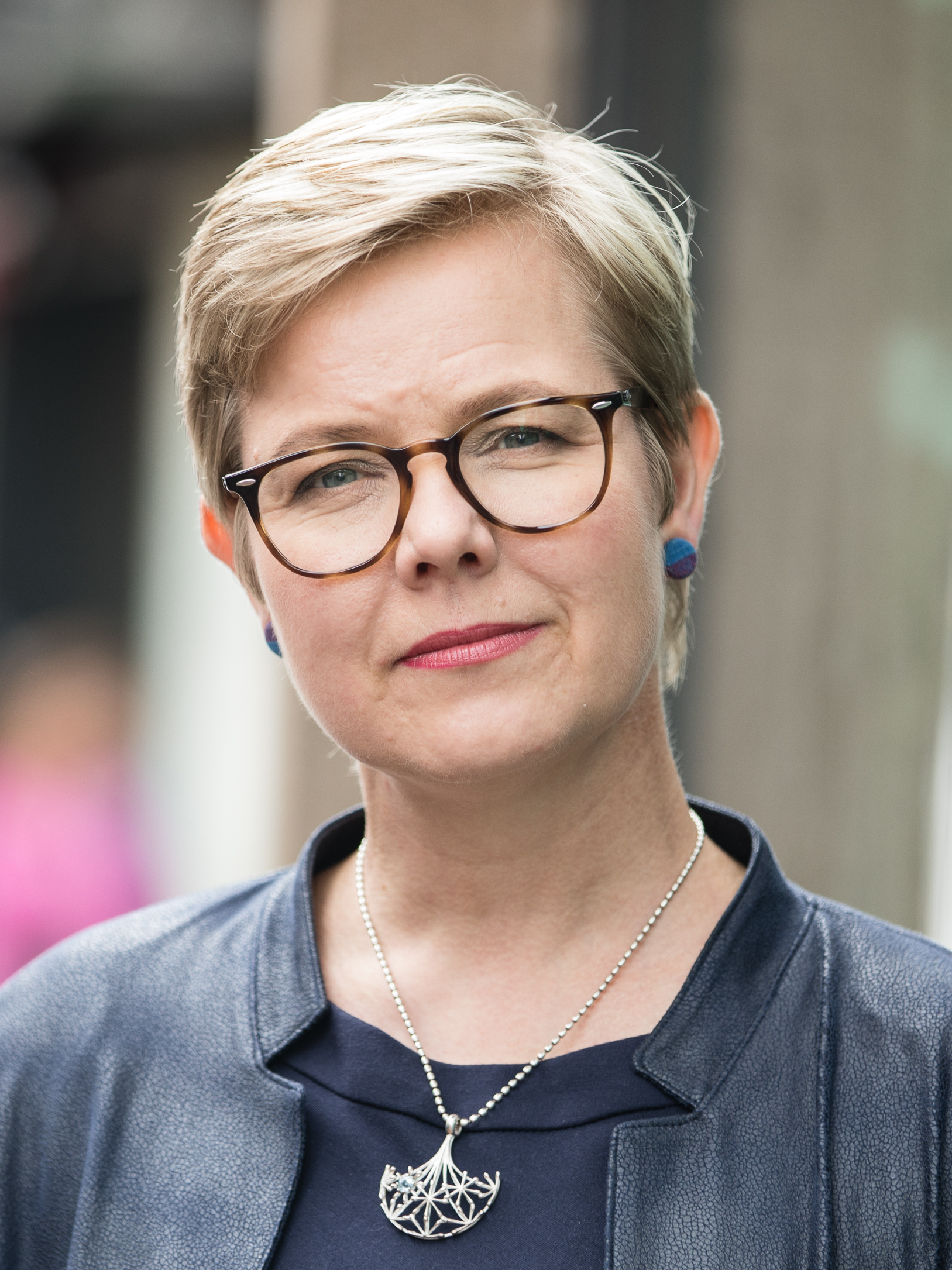
- Mikkonen in 2019

Minister of the Interior
- In office 19 November 2021 – 20 June 2023
- Prime Minister: Sanna Marin
- Preceded by: Maria Ohisalo
- Succeeded by: Mari Rantanen

Minister of the Environment and Climate Change
- In office 6 June 2019 – 19 November 2021
- Prime Minister: Antti Rinne; Sanna Marin
- Preceded by: Kimmo Tiilikainen
- Succeeded by: Emma Kari

Member of the Finnish Parliament
- Incumbent
- Assumed office 22 April 2015
- Constituency: Savo-Karelia

Personal details
- Born: Krista Johanna Mikkonen; 15 November 1972 (age 53) Hamina, Kymenlaakso, Finland
- Party: Green League
- Education: University of Joensuu

Krista Johanna Mikkonen (born 15 November 1972 in Hamina, Finland) is a Finnish politician of the Green League, a member of parliament, and Finland's Minister of the Interior. She lives in Joensuu but spent her childhood in Koria. She was first elected to the Finnish Parliament in the 2015 parliamentary election for the Savo-Karelia constituency. Between 2016 and 2019, Mikkonen was the chairman of the Green League parliamentary group. Mikkonen graduated with a Master of Philosophy degree from the University of Joensuu (present day University of Eastern Finland) in North Karelia in 2003.

Mikkonen was elected as a Member of the Finnish Parliament in the 2015 parliamentary elections with 4624 votes and re-elected in 2019 with 6204 votes. Her constituency is Savonia-Karelia. She had previously been nominated in three parliamentary elections in 1999, 2007 and 2011 in the constituency of North Karelia.

== Other activities ==
Mikkonen was also a member of the advisory board of the National Audit Office of Finland (NAOF) between 2017 and 2019.

Political offices
| Preceded by Maria Ohisalo | Minister of the Interior; 2021–present | Incumbent |
