= Emma Kari =

Finnish politician (born 1983)

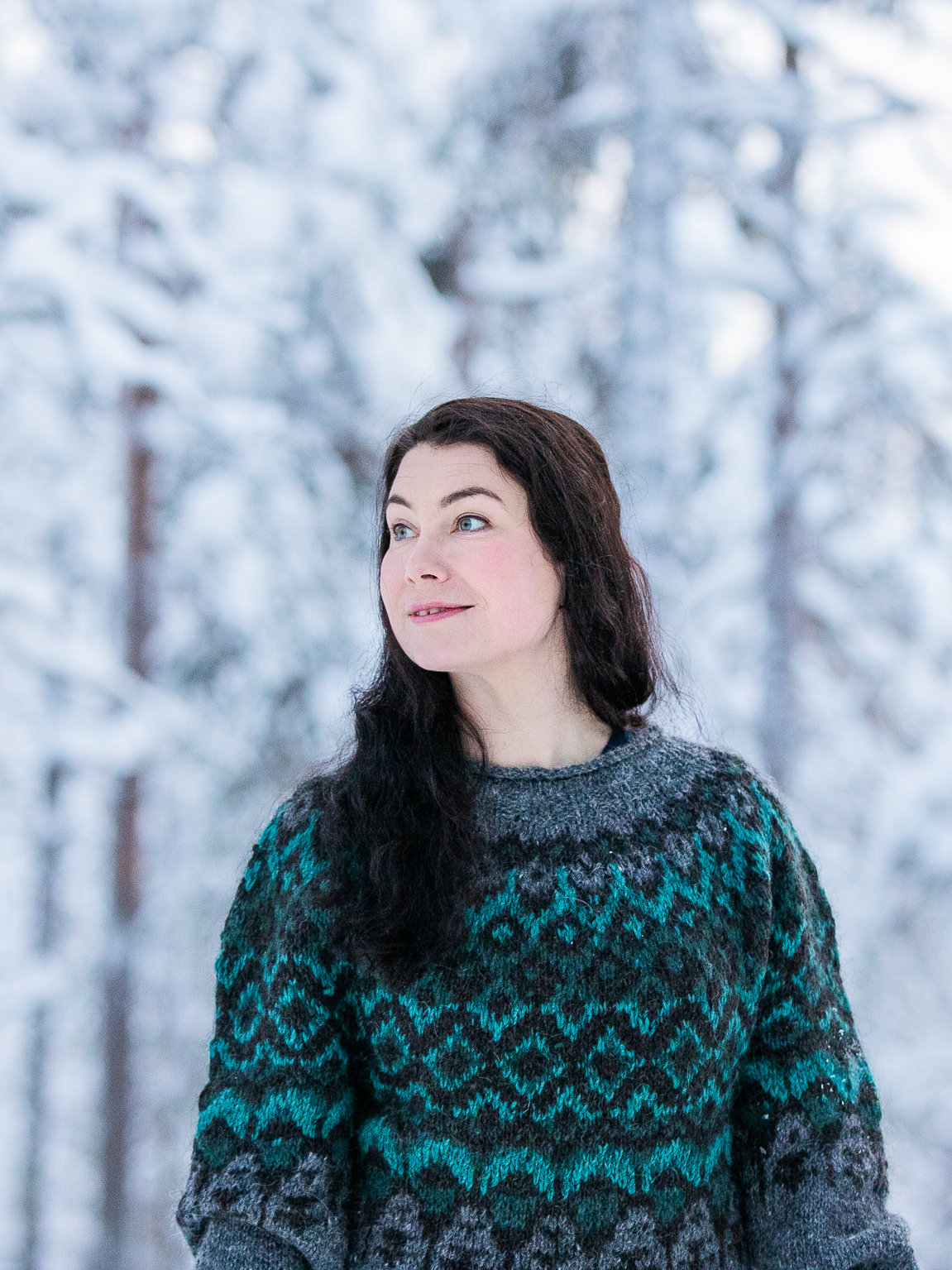
- Emma Kari in 2022

Minister of the Environment and Climate Change
- In office 19 November 2021 – 7 June 2022
- Prime Minister: Sanna Marin
- Preceded by: Krista Mikkonen
- Succeeded by: Maria Ohisalo

Member of the Finnish Parliament
- Incumbent
- Assumed office 22 April 2015
- Constituency: Helsinki

Personal details
- Born: Emma Karoliina Kari; 15 May 1983 (age 42) Espoo, Uusimaa, Finland
- Party: Green League

Emma Karoliina Kari (born 15 May 1983 in Espoo) is a Finnish politician of the Green League. She was elected to the Parliament of Finland in the 2015 parliamentary election with a vote total of 4,647. Kari has served in the City Council of Helsinki since 2008.

Emma Kari and Kukka Ranta have written a book titled Kalavale that addresses the consequences of commercial fishing.
