= Maria Ohisalo =

Finnish politician (born 1985)

Maria Ohisalo MEP
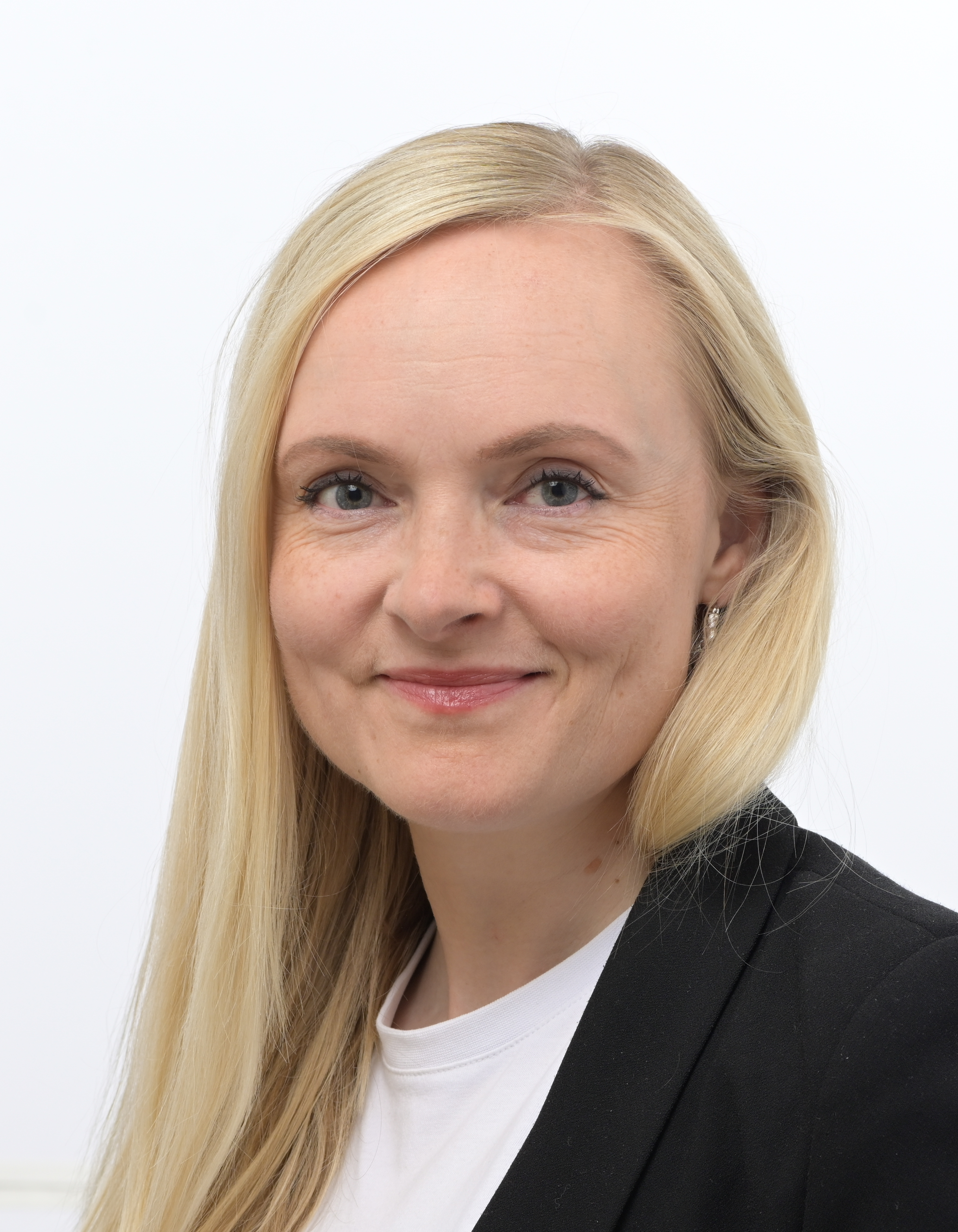
- Ohisalo in 2024

Minister of the Environment and Climate Change
- In office 7 June 2022 – 20 June 2023
- Prime Minister: Sanna Marin
- Preceded by: Emma Kari
- Succeeded by: Kai Mykkänen

Minister of the Interior
- In office 6 June 2019 – 19 November 2021
- Prime Minister: Antti Rinne; Sanna Marin
- Preceded by: Kai Mykkänen
- Succeeded by: Krista Mikkonen

Member of the Finnish Parliament for Helsinki
- In office 17 April 2019 – 15 July 2024

Member of the European Parliament
- Incumbent
- Assumed office 16 July 2024
- Constituency: Finland

Chairman of the Green League
- In office 15 June 2019 – 10 June 2023
- Preceded by: Pekka Haavisto
- Succeeded by: Sofia Virta

Personal details
- Born: 8 March 1985 (age 41) Helsinki, Uusimaa, Finland
- Party: Green League
- Spouse: Miika Johansson
- Children: 1
- Education: University of Helsinki (BSSc, MSSc); University of Eastern Finland (SScD)

Maria Karoliina Ohisalo (born 8 March 1985) is a Finnish politician and researcher who served as Minister of the Interior between 2019 and 2021. The former chairman of the Green League, she has been a Member of Parliament since 2019.

Ohisalo served as the Green League's interim chairman after Touko Aalto stepped down in September 2018. She was the only candidate in the Green League leadership election that was held in June 2019. She co-chaired the Union of Green Youth and Students from 2013 to 2014 and has been a member of the Helsinki City Council since 2017 and an MP since 2019.

== Early life and studies ==
Ohisalo was born in 1985 in Vesala in eastern Helsinki. She lived her childhood in poverty in the suburbs of Helsinki, as her parents were often unemployed, and she spent one year in a shelter. Her father's alcohol problem led to the separation of her parents. Her mother, however, continued her studies and worked in the evenings and on weekends. Ohisalo was already active in football and athletics at a young age.

Ohisalo graduated from the Mäkelänrinne Sports High School in 2004 and received a master's degree in social science from the University of Helsinki in 2011.

In 2017, Ohisalo defended her doctorate in sociology at the University of Eastern Finland's Department of Social Sciences. For her doctoral work, she studied food aid and long-term homelessness at the Socca Social Expertise Center in the Helsinki Metropolitan Area, under the auspices of the Helsinki City Social and Health Agency. During her studies from 2014 to 2017, Ohisalo was a member of the Federation of Higher Education Students in Social Sciences.

She worked as a researcher at the Y Foundation.

== Political career ==
Maria Ohisalo spoke at the Oulu Party Conference of the Greens in 2015.

Ohisalo joined the Green League in 2008.

In 2010, Ohisalo was elected a member of the Kallio parochial church council (Evangelical Lutheran Church of Finland), but she resigned when she moved away from the area in October 2011.

Ohisalo has been a member of the Green Union Social and Health Policy Programming Group from 2010 to 2011.

Ohisalo was chairman of the International Affairs Working Group of the Federation of Green Youth and Students in 2011. In 2012, she was a member of the board of the organization and responsible for international affairs.

In 2012, Ohisalo was chairman of the Youth Working Group on the Future of Nordic Cooperation in the Ministry of Foreign Affairs. She was also a member of the board of directors of the Nordic Youth League in 2012.

In the 2012 Helsinki municipal elections, Ohisalo received 612 votes and became a deputy delegate.

In 2013, she was a member of the Youth Board and a member of the Board of the Helsinki and Uusimaa Hospital District for the remainder of 2014 to 2017. She was elected to the City Council of Helsinki with 4,400 votes in the 2017 municipal elections.

In 2013, she was elected co-chairman of the Federation of Green Youth and Students together with Veli-Matti Partanen and in 2014 together with Aaro Häkkinen. She was a member of the party council from 2013 to 2015.

Ohisalo was a candidate for the 2014 European Parliament elections and received 3,089 votes.

In June 2015, she was elected vice-chairman of the Green League.

She was also a candidate for the 2015 parliamentary elections and received 4,087 votes, which was only 109 votes less than necessary to be elected.

From 2015 to 2018, she was a member of the parish council of Helsinki and the council of the parish of Paavali (Saint Paul).

Ohisalo was nominated for the chairmanship of the Green League in the pre-election vote among party members before the 2017 Tampere party congress and attracted national attention after coming very close to second place among the six candidates, despite being relatively unknown. On 18 September 2018, she was appointed as the official vice chairman of the Greens while Touko Aalto was on sick leave.

Ohisalo was nominated for the parliamentary election in 2019 and became a member of parliament in the constituency of Helsinki. She received 11,797 votes and was the country's seventh most popular female candidate.

In June 2019, the Greens decided to present Ohisalo as their choice for the post of minister of the interior in the Antti Rinne cabinet.

In June 2019, Ohisalo was elected chairman of the Greens at the party congress in the city of Pori.

In the 2023 parliamentary election, Ohisalo was re-elected with 6,937 votes. However, as the Greens suffered an election defeat, Ohisalo announced that she would not seek another term as chairman. In June 2023, she was replaced by Sofia Virta.

In the European elections 2024, she got elected to the European Parliament, representing the Green League in the Greens/EFA Group.

== Personal life ==
Ohisalo has played football in FC Kontu and FC Viikingit and has participated in athletics competing for Helsingin Kisa-Veikot. In adulthood, she has won prizes in track cycling.

Playing video games – including those by Nintendo – has been an important hobby for her. At one time she considered applying for game designer training.

Ohisalo's spouse is Miika Johansson. They have two children. As of 2026, she lives in Stockholm, Sweden, and Brussels, Belgium.

== Honors ==
- Order of the White Rose of Finland (Finland, 2022)

Political offices
Preceded by Kai Mykkänen	Minister of the Interior; 2019–2021	Succeeded by Krista Mikkonen
Preceded by Pekka Haavisto	Chairman of the Green League; 2019–2023	Succeeded by Sofia Virta
