= Kalle Könkkölä =

Finnish politician and human rights activist

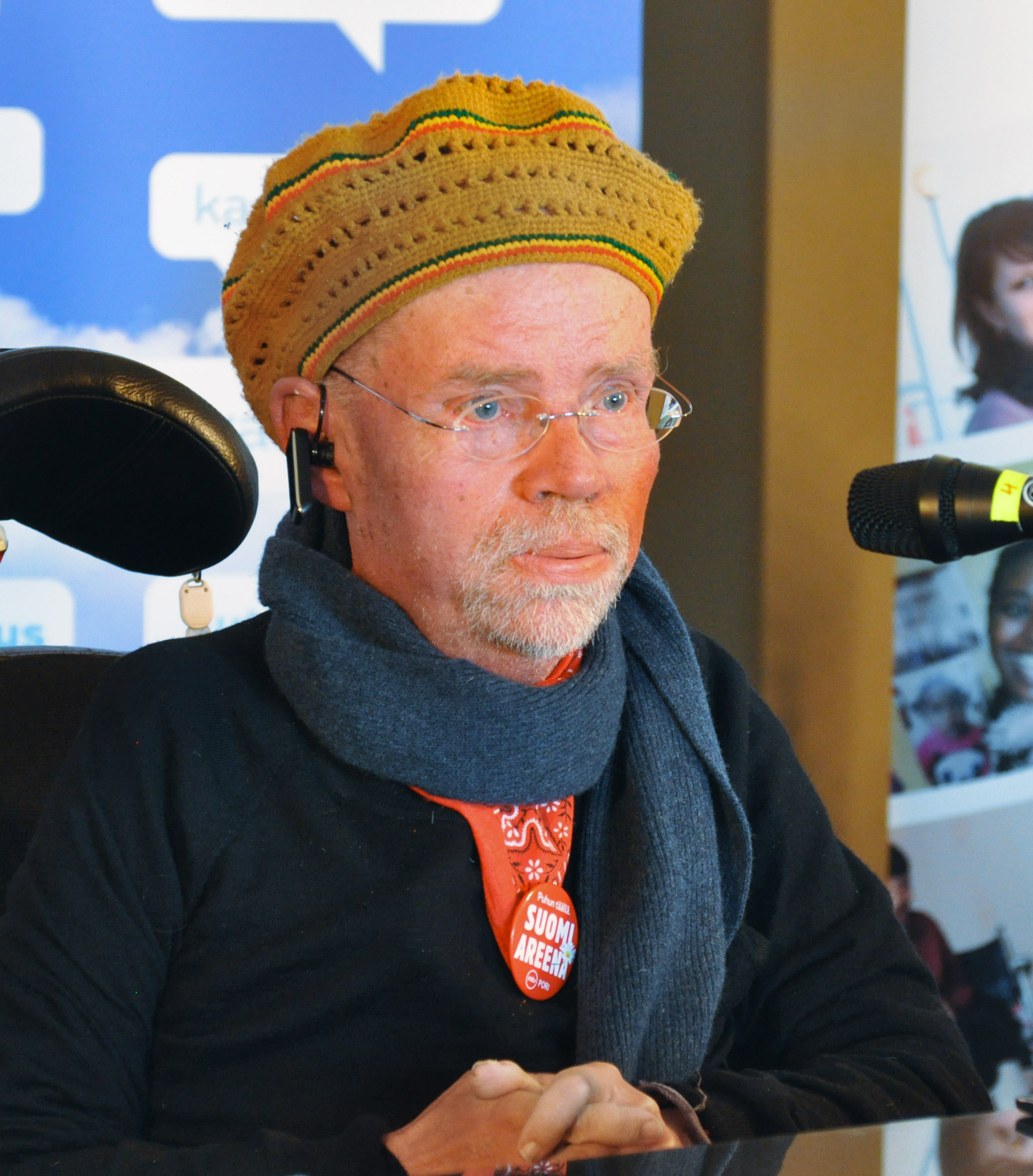
Kalle Könkkölä

Kalle Kustaa Topias Könkkölä (16 January 1950 – 11 September 2018) was a Finnish politician and human rights activist. He was one of the two first Green members of the Finnish Parliament, from 1983 to 1987, even before the Green League became a political party. He was the first chairperson of the Green League and the first Finnish MP with a disability.

== Early life and education ==
Könkkölä was born in Helsinki, and was physically disabled from birth. His father was an engineer and his mother was an office worker. The family of six lived in Äänekoski for a few years due to his father's work, where Kalle began his schooling.

Könkkölä graduated from high school in 1969 and obtained a Bachelor's degree in mathematics from the University of Helsinki in 1974.

== Social activity ==
During his student years, Könkkölä became involved in student politics, and after graduating, he, along with some of his student friends, was involved in founding the Helsinki Movement. The movement participated in the 1976 municipal elections but did not succeed in getting any of its candidates elected to the Helsinki City Council.

Könkkölä served as the Executive Director of Hengityslaitepotilaat ry from 1974 to 1997, as the editor-in-chief of Tiedotuskynnys magazine since 1975, and as the Secretary-General of the National Disability Council from 1998 to 2003.

He was the executive director of the Threshold Association (Kynnys), a cross-disability organization which campaigns for the basic and human rights of persons with disabilities, including accessibility. He was the founder and chairman of the board of Abilis Foundation, supporting development cooperation for people with disabilities (2010).

== Political activity ==
Könkkölä was one of the two first Green members of the Finnish Parliament, from 1983 to 1987, even before the Green League became a political party. He was the first chairperson of the Green League and the first Finnish MP with a disability.

In the Parliament, Könkkölä was a member of the Social Affairs Committee.

Könkkölä was a member of the Helsinki City Council from 1985 to 2004.

Initially, Könkkölä was denied the right to a personal assistant in Parliament—there was no current assistant system in the 1980s, but Könkkölä took the matter to the Administrative Court, where he won his case. After this, the Parliament hired him an assistant for secretarial work at the lowest salary grade of the state.

== Personal life ==
He was married to architect Maija Könkkölä from 1976 until her death in 2012.

Könkkölä died of pneumonia on 11 September 2018, at the age of 68.

== Publications ==
- Vammaiset, Suomi, Maailma, 1991
- Huoneekseni tuli maailma, with Heini Saraste, 1996, WSOY ISBN 951-0-21023-4
- Tunne oikeutesi, pidä puolesi, auta muitakin. Vammaisten ihmisten ihmisoikeusopas. Helsinki: Valtakunnallinen vammaisneuvosto, 2003. ISBN 952-00-1298-2

Party political offices
| Preceded by - | Chairperson of the Green League; 1987 | Succeeded by Heidi Hautala |
