= Touko Aalto =

Finnish politician

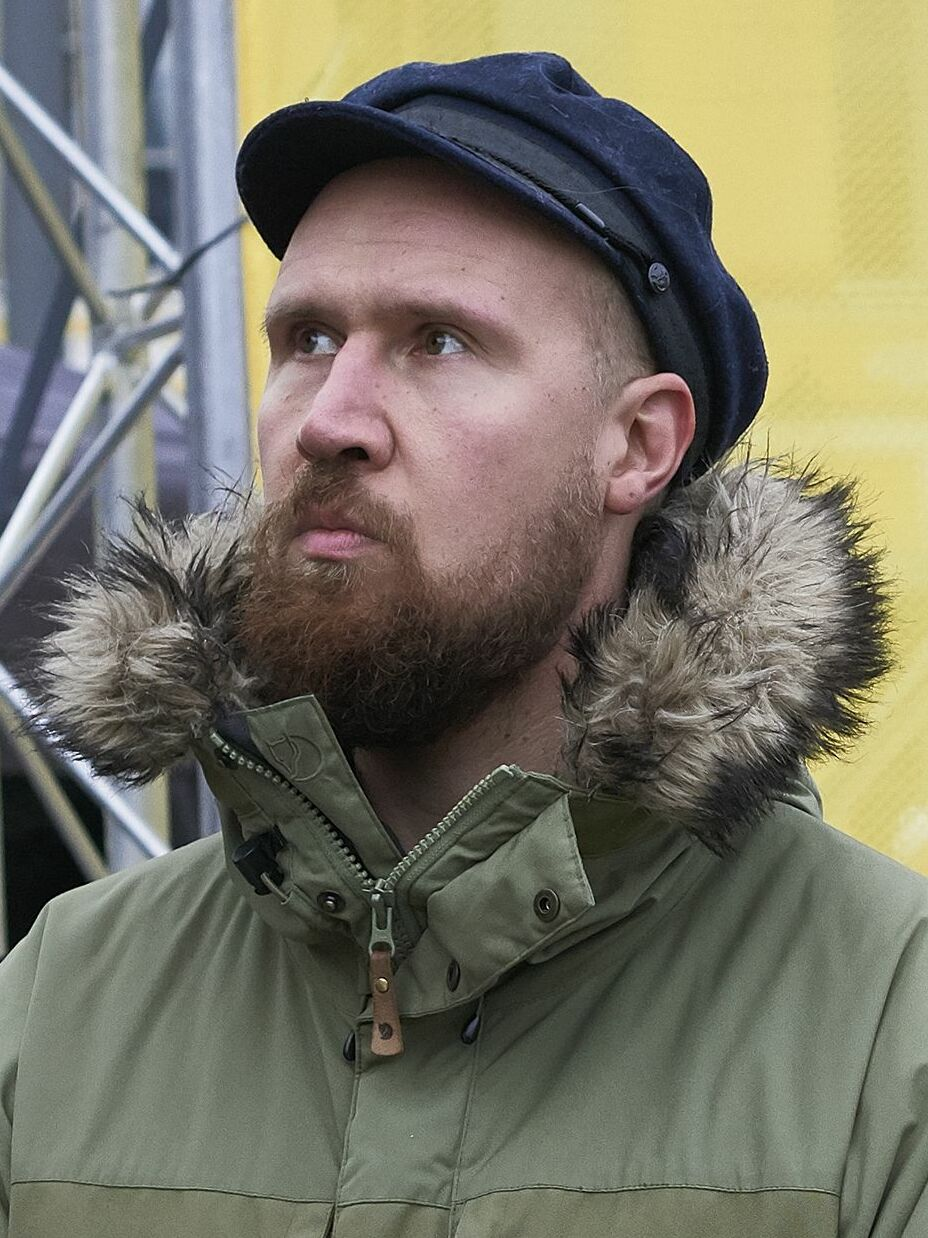
- Aalto in 2018.

Chairman of the Green League
- In office 17 June 2017 – 3 November 2018
- Preceded by: Ville Niinistö
- Succeeded by: Pekka Haavisto

Member of the Finnish Parliament
- In office 22 April 2015 – 16 April 2019

Personal details
- Born: 1 April 1984 (age 42) Savonlinna, Finland
- Party: Green League

Touko Juhani Aalto (born 1 April 1984) is a Finnish politician. He was chairman of the Green League from 2017 to 2018. He represented the electoral district of Central Finland in the Parliament of Finland 2015–2019.

== Life ==
Aalto was born in Savonlinna and later lived in Joensuu. He currently lives in Jyväskylä, Finland. Aalto graduated as Bachelor of Social Sciences from the University of Jyväskylä in 2008. He worked as a cleaner and salesperson before becoming parliamentary assistant of MP Jani Toivola in 2011.

Aalto was elected to the City Council of Jyväskylä in 2008 and to the Parliament in 2015. He is the first Green Member of the Parliament from Central Finland. He is currently member of the Finance Committee of the Parliament. In the 2017 municipal elections, Aalto received the most personal votes in Jyväskylä at the same time when the Green League became the largest party of Jyväskylä. On 17 June 2017, Aalto won the Green League leadership election, and became the chairman of the party.

In September 2018, Aalto took a sick leave due to exhaustion and his duties were temporarily handed to the first deputy chair Maria Ohisalo. In October 2018, he announced that he is resigning from his post, citing depression and fatigue. Aalto took part in the 2019 parliamentary election, but was not re-elected.

In June 2023, Aalto was chosen as the municipal manager of Toivakka.

== Electoral history ==
=== Municipal elections ===
Year	Municipality	Votes	Result
2008	Jyväskylä	493	Elected
2012	Jyväskylä	863	Elected
2017	Jyväskylä	2,371	Elected

=== European Parliament elections ===
Year	Electoral district	Votes	Result
2009	Finland	2,095	Not elected
2014	Finland	2,681	Not elected

=== Parliamentary elections ===
Year	Electoral district	Votes	Result
2011	Central Finland	1,721	Not elected
2015	Central Finland	4,326	Elected
2019	Central Finland	3,075	Not elected

== Personal life ==
Aalto was married to Johanna Pietiläinen from 2015 to 2017.
