= Pekka Sauri =

Finnish psychologist and politician (born 1954)

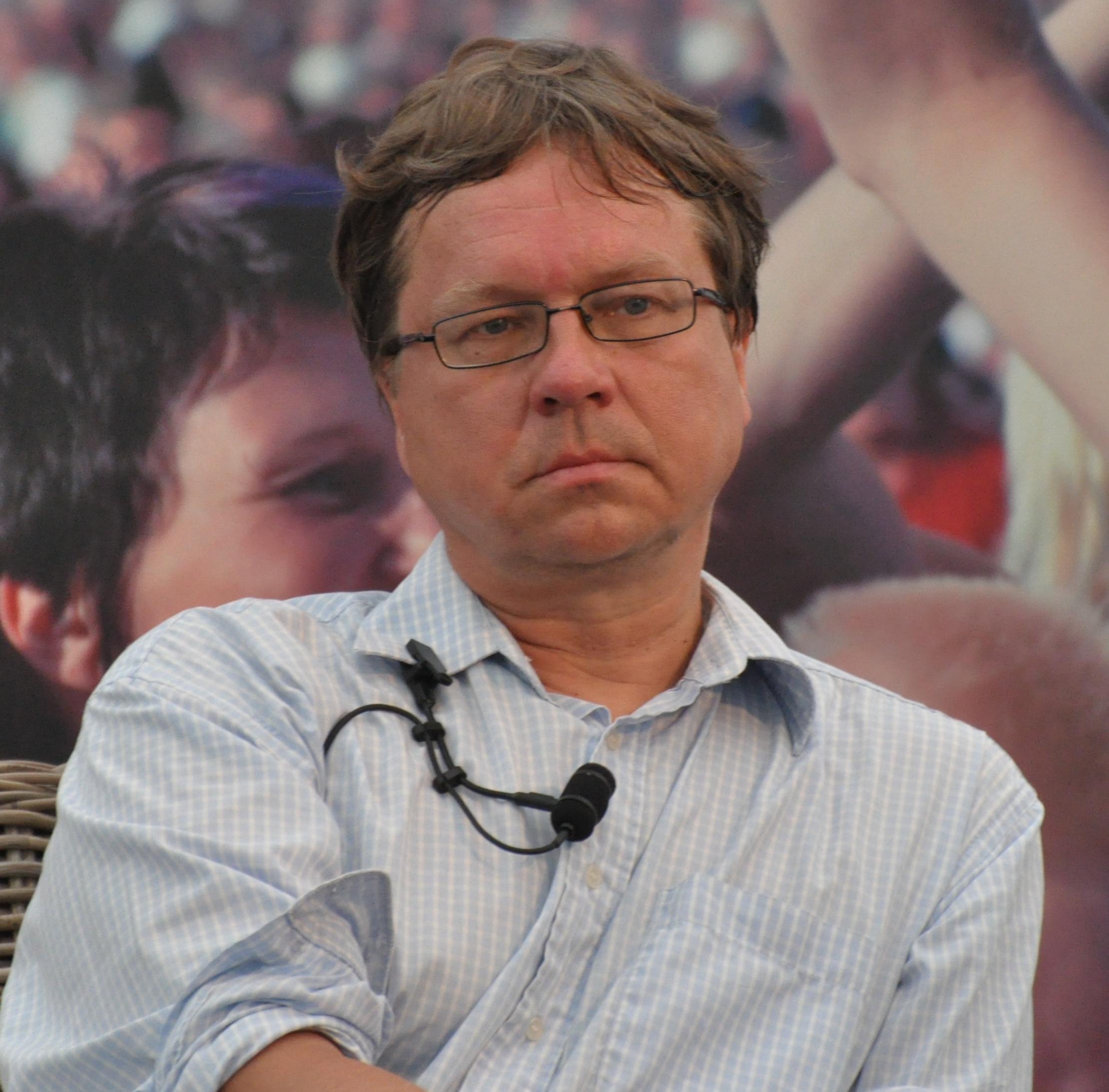
Pekka Sauri in 2010.

Pekka Markus Sauri (born 31 May 1954 in Helsinki) is a Finnish psychologist and a Green League politician. He is formerly the deputy mayor of Finland's capital city, Helsinki and chair of the Procura^{+} Campaign for sustainable procurement. Sauri became well known in Finland during the late 1990s for hosting a popular radio show Yölinja ("Nightline") in which he tried to help callers with their various personal problems.

Sauri attended the Helsinki University, receiving his bachelor's degree in 1975, master's in 1977 and licentiate degree in 1980. In 1990 he got his Ph.D. from the Brunel University in London.

In a feature interview, he described his nation, “Finland is one of the most successful societies on the planet. Of course, we have our share of negatives, but on the whole, it’s more or less a paradise on Earth: a pretty good Golden Cut between reliability and creativity.” He claims to have no higher political ambitions.

Pekka Sauri has been active in the municipal politics of Helsinki since mid-1980s. From 1993 to 2003 he was an elected member of the city council. In 2001 he became the chairman of the city council, and in 2003 he was appointed the deputy mayor of Helsinki, being the first Green politician to achieve such posts in any Finnish municipality. He was the party secretary of the Green League 1990—1991 and the chairman 1991—1993. Sauri has not been elected to the Finnish Parliament despite being a candidate several times. Sauri has written several books and his caricature cartoons have been published in many Finnish papers.

Party political offices
Preceded by Heidi Hautala	Chairperson of the Green League; 1991–1993	Succeeded by Pekka Haavisto
